= Illinois Fighting Illini men's basketball statistical leaders =

The Illinois Fighting Illini men's basketball statistical leaders are individual statistical leaders of the Illinois Fighting Illini men's basketball program in various categories, including points, rebounds, assists, steals, and blocks. Within those areas, the lists identify single-game, single-season, and career leaders. The Fighting Illini represent the University of Illinois in the NCAA's Big Ten Conference.

Illinois began competing in intercollegiate basketball in 1905. However, the school's record book does not generally list records from before the 1950s, as records from before this period are often incomplete and inconsistent. Since scoring was much lower in this era, and teams played much fewer games during a typical season, it is likely that few or no players from this era would appear on these lists anyway.

The NCAA did not officially record assists as a stat until the 1983–84 season, and blocks and steals until the 1985–86 season, but Illinois's record books includes players in these stats before these seasons. These lists are updated through the end of the 2025–26 season.

== Scoring ==
Career
Rank	Player	Points	Seasons
1	Deon Thomas	2,129	1990–91 1991–92 1992–93 1993–94
2	Kiwane Garris	1,948	1993–94 1994–95 1995–96 1996–97
3	Malcolm Hill	1,846	2013–14 2014–15 2015–16 2016–17
4	Dee Brown	1,812	2002–03 2003–04 2004–05 2005–06
5	Trent Frazier	1,794	2017–18 2018–19 2019–20 2020–21 2021–22
6	Brian Cook	1,748	1999–00 2000–01 2001–02 2002–03
7	Cory Bradford	1,735	1998–99 1999–00 2000–01 2001–02
8	Demetri McCamey	1,718	2007–08 2008–09 2009–10 2010–11
9	Eddie Johnson	1,692	1977–78 1978–79 1979–80 1980–81
10	Brandon Paul	1,654	2009–10 2010–11 2011–12 2012–13

Season
Rank	Player	Points	Season
1	Terrence Shannon Jr.	736	2023–24
2	Donnie Freeman	668	1965–66
3	Keaton Wagler	663	2025–26
4	Andy Kaufmann	660	1990–91
5	Nick Anderson	647	1988–89
6	Ken Norman	641	1986–87
7	Luther Head	622	2004–05
	Kiwane Garris	622	1996–97
9	Malcolm Hill	614	2015–16
10	Eddie Johnson	610	1979–80

Single game
Rank	Player	Points	Season	Opponent
1	Dave Downey	53	1962–63	Indiana
2	Andrej Stojakovic	46	2026–27	Duke
	Keaton Wagler	46	2025–26	Purdue
	Andy Kaufmann	46	1990–91	Wisconsin-Milwaukee
5	Brandon Paul	43	2011–12	Ohio State
6	Dave Scholz	42	1967–68	Northwestern
7	Terrence Shannon Jr.	40	2023–24	Nebraska
	Malcolm Hill	40	2016–17	Northern Kentucky
	Andy Kaufmann	40	1990–91	Eastern Illinois
	Andy Phillip	40	1942–43	Chicago

== Rebounds ==
Career
Rank	Player	Rebounds	Seasons
1	James Augustine	1,023	2002–03 2003–04 2004–05 2005–06
2	Mike Davis	909	2007–08 2008–09 2009–10 2010–11
3	Kofi Cockburn	861	2019–20 2020-21 2021–22
4	Efrem Winters	853	1982–83 1983–84 1984–85 1985–86
5	Deon Thomas	846	1990–91 1991–92 1992–93 1993–94
6	Eddie Johnson	831	1977–78 1978–79 1979–80 1980–81
7	Skip Thoren	830	1962–63 1963–64 1964–65
8	Brian Cook	815	1999–00 2000–01 2001–02 2002–03
9	Nick Weatherspoon	803	1970–71 1971–72 1972–73
10	Dave Downey	790	1960–61 1961–62 1962–63

Season
Rank	Player	Rebounds	Season
1	Skip Thoren	349	1964–65
2	Skip Thoren	331	1963–64
3	Mike Davis	330	2009–10
4	Eddie Johnson	310	1979–80
5	Ken Norman	303	1986–87
6	James Augustine	300	2005–06
7	David Mirkovic	297	2025–26
8	Kofi Cockburn	296	2021–22
9	James Augustine	295	2004–05
	Nick Weatherspoon	295	1972–73

Single game
Rank	Player	Rebounds	Season	Opponent
1	Skip Thoren	24	1963–64	UCLA
2	Nick Weatherspoon	23	1970–71	Michigan
3	Nick Weatherspoon	22	1972–73	DePauw
	Deon Flessner	22	1966–67	Georgia Tech
	Skip Thoren	22	1964–65	Villanova
	Skip Thoren	22	1964–65	Kentucky
7	David Mirkovic	21	2025–26	Colgate
	Rich Jones	21	1965–66	Northwestern
	Skip Thoren	21	1964–65	Indiana
	Bill Burwell	21	1961–62	Wisconsin
	Dave Downey	21	1961–62	Creighton

== Assists ==
Career
Rank	Player	Assists	Seasons
1	Bruce Douglas	765	1982–83 1983–84 1984–85 1985–86
2	Demetri McCamey	733	2007–08 2008–09 2009–10 2010–11
3	Dee Brown	674	2002–03 2003–04 2004–05 2005–06
4	Deron Williams	594	2002–03 2003–04 2004–05
5	Kiwane Garris	502	1993–94 1994–95 1995–96 1996–97
6	Stephen Bardo	495	1986–87 1987–88 1988–89 1989–90
7	Chester Frazier	484	2005–06 2006–07 2007–08 2008–09
8	Richard Keene	459	1992–93 1993–94 1994–95 1995–96
9	Trent Frazier	452	2017–18 2018–19 2019–20 2020–21 2021–22
10	Frank Williams	432	1999–00 2000–01 2001–02

Season
Rank	Player	Assists	Season
1	Deron Williams	264	2004–05
2	Demetri McCamey	254	2009–10
3	Demetri McCamey	208	2010–11
4	Bruce Douglas	200	1984–85
5	Bruce Douglas	199	1985–86
6	Tony Wysinger	192	1986–87
7	Dee Brown	191	2005–06
8	Bruce Douglas	189	1982–83
9	Deron Williams	185	2003–04
10	Kiwane Garris	180	1996–97

Single game
Rank	Player	Assists	Season	Opponent
1	Demetri McCamey	16	2009–10	Purdue
	Tony Wysinger	16	1986–87	Pittsburgh
3	Bruce Douglas	15	1985–86	Houston
4	Dee Brown	13	2004–05	Longwood
	Frank Williams	13	1999–00	Loyola-Chicago
	Kiwane Garris	13	1996–97	Virginia Tech
	Bruce Douglas	13	1984–85	Minnesota
	Kasparas Jakučionis	13	2024–25	SIU Edwardsville
9	Ayo Dosunmu	12	2020–21	Wisconsin
	Chester Frazier	12	2008–09	Clemson
	Deron Williams	12	2004–05	Penn State
	Kiwane Garris	12	1996–97	USC
	Richard Keene	12	1993–94	UIC
	Rennie Clemons	12	1990–91	Oregon State
	Bruce Douglas	12	1982–83	Wisconsin
	Bruce Douglas	12	1982–83	Texas A&M
	Derek Harper	12	1981–82	Michigan
	Derek Harper	12	1980–81	Northwestern
	Derek Harper	12	1980–81	Purdue

== Steals ==
Career
Rank	Player	Steals	Seasons
1	Bruce Douglas	324	1982–83 1983–84 1984–85 1985–86
2	Dee Brown	231	2002–03 2003–04 2004–05 2005–06
3	Kendall Gill	218	1986–87 1987–88 1988–89 1989–90
4	Frank Williams	212	1999–00 2000–01 2001–02
5	Sergio McClain	210	1997–98 1998–99 1999–00 2000–01
6	Trent Frazier	207	2017–18 2018–19 2019–20 2020–21 2021–22
7	Derek Harper	178	1980–81 1981–82 1982–83
8	Kiwane Garris	163	1993–94 1994–95 1995–96 1996–97
9	Kenny Battle	161	1987–88 1988–89
	Mark Smith	161	1977–78 1978–79 1979–80 1980–81

Season
Rank	Player	Steals	Season
1	Kenny Battle	89	1988–89
2	Bruce Douglas	88	1985–86
3	Bruce Douglas	85	1984–85
4	Bruce Douglas	78	1982–83
5	Frank Williams	74	1999–00
6	Bruce Douglas	73	1983–84
7	Kenny Battle	72	1987–88
	Derek Harper	72	1982–83
9	Frank Williams	71	2001–02
	Sergio McClain	71	1998–99

Single game
Rank	Player	Steals	Season	Opponent
1	Bruce Douglas	8	1983–84	Purdue
2	Kendall Gill	7	1989–90	Iowa
	Kendall Gill	7	1986–87	Eastern Illinois
	Kenny Battle	7	1987–88	Michigan
	Bruce Douglas	7	1985–86	Michigan
	Bruce Douglas	7	1985–86	Wisconsin-Green Bay
	Bruce Douglas	7	1984–85	Northwestern
	Bruce Douglas	7	1983–84	Northwestern
	Derek Harper	7	1982–83	Michigan

== Blocks ==
Career
Rank	Player	Blocks	Seasons
1	Nnanna Egwu	201	2011–12 2012–13 2013–14 2014–15
2	Deon Thomas	177	1990–91 1991–92 1992–93 1993–94
3	Mike Tisdale	176	2007–08 2008–09 2009–10 2010–11
4	Derek Holcomb	174	1978–79 1979–80 1980–81
5	James Griffin	156	1978–79 1979–80 1980–81 1981–82
6	James Augustine	139	2002–03 2003–04 2004–05 2005–06
7	Brian Cook	136	1999–00 2000–01 2001–02 2002–03
8	Kofi Cockburn	111	2019–20 2020-21 2021–22
9	Efrem Winters	103	1982–83 1983–84 1984–85 1985–86
10	Coleman Hawkins	102	2020-21 2021–22 2022–23 2023–24

Season
Rank	Player	Blocks	Season
1	Derek Holcomb	86	1978–79
2	Nnanna Egwu	73	2013–14
3	Zvonimir Ivišić	72	2025–26
4	Meyers Leonard	60	2011–12
5	Nnanna Egwu	59	2014–15
	Mike Tisdale	59	2009–10
7	James Griffin	56	1981–82
8	Mike Tisdale	54	2010–11
	Deon Thomas	54	1990–91
10	Brian Cook	50	2001–02

Single game
Rank	Player	Blocks	Season	Opponent
1	Derek Holcomb	11	1978–79	South Carolina
2	Zvonimir Ivišić	7	2025–26	Florida Gulf Coast
	Mike Tisdale	7	2009–10	Penn State
	Deon Thomas	7	1991–92	Northwestern
	Derek Holcomb	7	1978–79	Centenary
6	Morez Johnson Jr.	6	2024–25	Eastern Illinois
	Matthew Mayer	6	2022–23	Michigan State
	Meyers Leonard	6	2011–12	Loyola-Chicago
	Marcus Griffin	6	2000–01	Northwestern
	Brian Cook	6	2000–01	Minnesota
	James Griffin	6	1981–82	Wisconsin
	James Griffin	6	1978–79	Denver
	Derek Holcomb	6	1980–81	Northwestern
