= Trent Frazier =

American basketball player (born 1998)

- Frazier with Virtus Bologna in 2026

No. 1 – Virtus Bologna
- Position: Point guard / shooting guard
- League: LBA; EuroLeague

Personal information
- Born: September 8, 1998 (age 28) Boynton Beach, Florida, U.S.
- Listed height: 6 ft 2 in (1.88 m)
- Listed weight: 155 lb (70 kg)

Career information
- High school: Wellington (Wellington, Florida)
- College: Illinois (2017–2022)
- NBA draft: 2022: undrafted
- Playing career: 2022–present

Career history
- 2022–2023: FMP
- 2023–2026: Zenit Saint Petersburg
- 2026–present: Virtus Bologna

Career highlights
- VTB League Supercup winner (2023); Russian Cup winner (2024); 2× Russian Cup Finals MVP (2023, 2024); Second-team All-Big Ten (2022); 2× Big Ten All-Defensive Team (2021, 2022); Big Ten All-Freshman Team (2018)

Trent Frazier (born September 8, 1998) is a Puerto Rican professional basketball player for Virtus Bologna of the Lega Basket Serie A (LBA) and the EuroLeague. He played college basketball for Illinois.

== High school career ==
As a sophomore, Frazier led Wellington High School to an 8A Florida High School Athletic Association basketball state championship, and hit the game-winning free throw with 0.4 seconds left for a 57–56 victory over Hagerty High School. Frazier played under legendary hoops coach and 8A coach of the year, Matt Colin.

During his senior season, Frazier averaged 27.6 points, 6.3 rebounds and 4.4 assists, leading Wellington to a 27–4 record and Florida Class 9A State Semifinals appearance.

=== Recruiting ===
After his official visit to Illinois, Frazier verbally committed to the program and former head coach John Groce on August 21, 2016. During his recruitment, Frazier considered offers from Baylor, Maryland, Kansas State, and Seton Hall.

In March 2017, Frazier reaffirmed his decision to play college basketball at Illinois after John Groce was fired and head coach Brad Underwood was hired away from Oklahoma State. Frazier had indicated that both his connections to his future teammates at Illinois and that Underwood had recruited Frazier while he was head coach at Stephen F. Austin were factors in the decision to remain committed to Illinois.

College recruiting
Name	Hometown	School	Height	Weight	Commit date
Trent Frazier; PG	Wellington, FL	Wellington (FL)	6 ft 2 in (1.88 m)	170 lb (77 kg)	Aug 21, 2016
Trent Frazier; PG	Recruit ratings: Scout: Rivals: 247Sports: ESPN: (82)				
Overall recruit ranking: Rivals: 95 247Sports: 109
Note: In many cases, Scout, Rivals, 247Sports, On3, and ESPN may conflict in their listings of height and weight.; In these cases, the average was taken. ESPN grades are on a 100-point scale.; Sources: "2017 Illinois Basketball Commitment List". Rivals.; "2017 Illinois Basketball Commitment List". Scout.; "2017 Illinois Basketball Commitment List". ESPN.; "Scout.com Team Recruiting Rankings". Scout.; "2017 Team Ranking". Rivals.

== College career ==
On February 8, 2018, Frazier scored a career high 32 points against Wisconsin at the State Farm Center. Frazier's 32 points were the third most points ever scored by a freshman in a single game in Illinois history, trailing only Deon Thomas and Kiwane Garris who are the first and second all-time leading scorers at Illinois. He also scored 27 points against Iowa, including a buzzer beating three to send the game into overtime. During his freshman season, Frazier led all Big Ten Conference freshman in scoring, assists, steals and three-pointers made per game, earning both conference All-Freshman team honors and Honorable Mention honors. Frazier averaged 12.5 points, 3.1 assists and 1.8 rebounds per game as a true freshman. As a sophomore, he averaged 13.7 points, 2.6 assists and 2.3 rebounds per game. Frazier served in a complementary role to Ayo Dosunmu as a junior, averaging 9.1 points and 1.9 assists per game. During the 2021–22 season Frazier reached the #5 spot on Illini men's basketball career scoring list. He was named second-team All-Big Ten.

== Professional career ==
On June 10, 2022, Frazier signed a contract with Serbian team FMP for the 2022–23 season.

=== Zenit Saint Petersburg (2023–2026) ===
On February 2, 2023, Frazier signed with Zenit Saint Petersburg of the VTB United League. As part of the team, Trent became the silver medalist of the Russian Cup and was recognized as the "Most Valuable Player of the Final Four" of the tournament. In July 2023, Frazier extended his contract with Zenit.

In the 2023/2024 season, Frazier became the bronze medalist of the VTB United League and the Russian Championship, as well as the winner of the VTB United League Super Cup. In the Russian Cup, Trent became the winner of the tournament and for the second time was recognized as the "Most Valuable Player of the Final Four".

In June 2024, Frazier signed a new 3-year contract with Zenit.

In the 2024/2025 season, Frazier became the bronze medalist of the VTB United League Super Cup.

In February 2025, Frazier was recognized as the "Most Valuable Player" of the VTB United League. Trent's averages at the end of the month were 17.5 points, 5.0 assists, 2.0 rebounds, 1.0 interceptions and 19.5 points in the performance rating.

=== Virtus Bologna (2026–present) ===
On July 22, 2026, Frazier signed with Virtus Bologna of the Italian Lega Basket Serie A (LBA) and the EuroLeague.

== Career statistics ==
Legend
GP	Games played	GS	Games started	MPG	Minutes per game
FG%	Field goal percentage	3P%	3-point field goal percentage	FT%	Free throw percentage
RPG	Rebounds per game	APG	Assists per game	SPG	Steals per game
BPG	Blocks per game	PPG	Points per game	**Bold**	Career high

=== College ===
Year	Team	GP	GS	MPG	FG%	3P%	FT%	RPG	APG	SPG	BPG	PPG
2017–18	Illinois	**32**	16	26.3	.405	.347	.644	1.8	3.1	**1.7**	.0	12.5
2018–19	Illinois	**32**	**31**	30.6	**.411**	**.406**	.759	2.3	2.6	1.4	.0	**13.7**
2019–20	Illinois	31	30	30.4	.327	.309	**.853**	2.2	1.9	.9	.0	9.1
2020–21	Illinois	31	**31**	32.8	.400	.362	.831	2.7	2.7	1.3	**.1**	10.2
2021–22	Illinois	31	30	**34.7**	.397	.328	.833	**2.8**	**4.1**	1.3	**.1**	11.6
Career		157	138	30.9	.390	.351	.776	2.4	2.9	1.3	.1	11.4

== Personal life ==
Frazier is of Puerto Rican descent and is frequently followed by Puerto Rican basketball scouting communities regarding his status or potential involvement with the Puerto Rico men's national basketball team program.
