= 1982 McDonald's All-American Boys Game =

American high school basketball game

West	East
103	84
	1st half	2nd half	Total
West	43	60	103
East	36	48	84
- Date: April 10, 1982
- Venue: Rosemont Horizon, Rosemont, IL
- MVP: Efrem Winters
- Referees: 1; 2; 3
- Attendance: 15,836

McDonald's All-American

The 1982 McDonald's All-American Boys Game was an All-star basketball game played on Saturday, April 10, 1982 at the Rosemont Horizon in Rosemont, Illinois. The game's rosters featured the best and most highly recruited high school boys graduating in 1982. The game was the 5th annual version of the McDonald's All-American Game first played in 1978.

== 1982 game ==
The game was not televised, but highlights were aired by CBS Sports. The East team could count on several guards and forwards, including heavily recruited Billy Thompson, considered one of the top players of the class. The West team had local favorites Efrem Winters and Bruce Douglas, both committed to Illinois, and had 5 guards and 6 centers on their roster: the only forward was Kerry Trotter. The West won 103–84 and Winters had a solid performance both on offense and on defense, and scored 19 points on 9/15 shooting, earning the MVP award. Dell Curry led the East with 20 points, while Thompson added 15; for the West, Kenny Walker was the top scorer with 20, and Trotter scored 14. The game attendance of 15,836 set a then all-time record not only for the McDonald's game, but also for high school basketball in the state of Illinois. Of the 25 players, 13 went on to play at least 1 game in the NBA.

=== East roster ===
No.	Name	Height	Weight	Position	Hometown	High school	College of Choice
–	Benoit Benjamin	7-0	–	C	Monroe, LA, U.S.	Carroll	Creighton
–	Dell Curry	6-5	–	G	Fort Defiance, VA, U.S.	Fort Defiance	Virginia Tech
–	Brad Daugherty	6-11	–	C	Swannanoa, NC, U.S.	Charles D. Owen	North Carolina
–	Johnny Dawkins	6-1	–	G	Washington, D.C., U.S.	Mackin	Duke
–	Donald Hartry	6-3	–	G	Milledgeville, GA, U.S.	Baldwin	Georgia
–	Curtis Hunter	6-4	–	G	Durham, NC, U.S.	Southern	North Carolina
–	Buck Johnson	6-6	–	F	Birmingham, AL, U.S.	Hayes	Alabama
–	Tim Kempton	6-9	–	F	Oyster Bay, NY, U.S.	St. Dominic	Notre Dame
–	Ernie Myers	6-4	–	G	Bronx, NY, U.S.	St. Nicholas of Tolentine	NC State
–	Harold Pressley	6-6	–	F	Uncasville, CT, U.S.	Saint Bernard	Villanova
–	Richard Rellford	6-6	–	F	Riviera Beach, FL, U.S.	Suncoast	Michigan
–	Billy Thompson	6-8	–	F	Camden, NJ, U.S.	Camden	Louisville
–	Kenny Walker	6-8	–	C	Roberta, GA, U.S.	Crawford County	Kentucky

=== West roster ===
No.	Name	Height	Weight	Position	Hometown	High school	College of Choice
–	Ken Barlow	6-10	–	C	Indianapolis, IN, U.S.	Cathedral	Notre Dame
–	Kerry Boagni	6-10	–	C	Gardena, CA, U.S.	Junípero Serra	Kansas
–	Willie Cutts	6-2	–	G	Bryant, AR, U.S.	Bryant	Arkansas
–	Bruce Douglas	6-3	–	G	Quincy, IL, U.S.	Quincy Senior	Illinois
–	Roger Harden	6-1	–	G	Valparaiso, IN, U.S.	Valparaiso	Kentucky
–	Montel Hatcher	6-1	–	G	Santa Monica, CA, U.S.	Santa Monica	UCLA
–	Eldridge Hudson	6-6	–	G	Carson, CA, U.S.	Carson	UNLV
–	Brad Lohaus	7-0	–	C	Phoenix, AZ, U.S.	Greenway	Iowa
–	Wayman Tisdale	6-9	–	C	Tulsa, OK, U.S.	Booker T. Washington	Oklahoma
–	Kerry Trotter	6-6	–	F	Omaha, NE, U.S.	Creighton Prep	Marquette
–	Efrem Winters	6-10	–	C	Chicago, IL, U.S.	Martin Luther King	Illinois
–	Steve Woodside	6-10	–	C	Portland, OR, U.S.	Parkrose	Oregon State

=== Coaches ===
The East team was coached by:

- Head Coach Joe Gallagher of St. John's College High School (Washington, D.C.)

The West team was coached by:

- Head Coach Ed Pepple of Mercer Island High School (Mercer Island, Washington)
