= State Farm Center =

Arena in Champaign, Illinois, United States

- Lou Henson Court

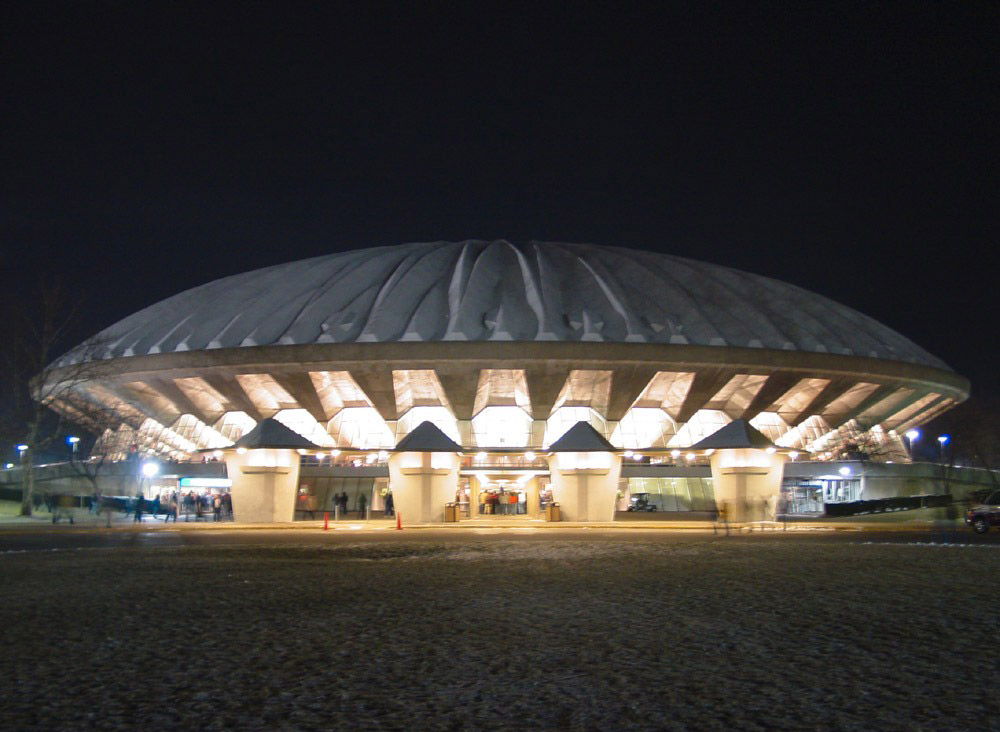
- Interactive map of State Farm Center
- Former names: Assembly Hall (1963–2013)
- Address: 1800 South 1st Street
- Location: Champaign, Illinois, U.S.
- Coordinates: 40.096259°N 88.235956°W
- Owner: University of Illinois
- Operator: University of Illinois
- Capacity: 15,544 (permanent), 16,500 (concert) (2016–present); 17,085 (2014–2015); 16,618 (2003–2014); 16,450 (1995–2003); 16,321 (1992–1995); 16,153 (1980–1992); 16,128 (1963–1980)
- Surface: Multi-surface
- Public transit: MTD

Construction
- Groundbreaking: May 25, 1959
- Opened: March 2, 1963
- Cost: $8.35 million ($87.8 million in 2025 dollars)
- Architect: Harrison & Abramovitz
- Structural engineer: Ammann & Whitney
- General contractor: Felmley-Dickerson Co.

Tenants
- Illinois Fighting Illini men's basketball (1963–present); Illinois Fighting Illini women's basketball (1981–1993, 1998–present); Illinois Fighting Illini wrestling (2022–present)

Website
- http://statefarmcenter.com/

The State Farm Center is a large dome-shaped 15,544-seat indoor arena located in Champaign, Illinois, owned and operated by the University of Illinois Urbana-Champaign. The arena hosts games for the Illinois Fighting Illini men's basketball, women's basketball, and wrestling teams. It also doubles as a performance and event center, and is one of the largest venues between Chicago and St. Louis. It opened in 1963 and was known until 2013 as Assembly Hall until State Farm Insurance acquired naming rights as part of a major renovation project.

== Size ==
The third largest Illinois arena after the United Center in Chicago and the Allstate Arena in Rosemont, State Farm Center has 15,544 permanent seats but, when portable chairs are placed on the floor for an in-the-round performance, there is a potential for an additional 1,000 depending on the stage configuration.

== Opening ==
State Farm Center opened as Assembly Hall on March 2, 1963, and continues to attract attention for its design and construction. From 1963 to 1965, Assembly Hall was the largest dome structure in North America until the opening of the Astrodome in Houston, Texas. The roof is supported by 614 miles (988 km) of one-quarter inch steel wire wrapped at the base of the dome under intensive pressure. The architect was Max Abramovitz, a University of Illinois alumnus. The contractor was Felmley-Dickerson Co of Urbana, led by Ray Dickerson, who built a number of buildings for the university.

== Main uses ==
=== Fighting Illini basketball ===
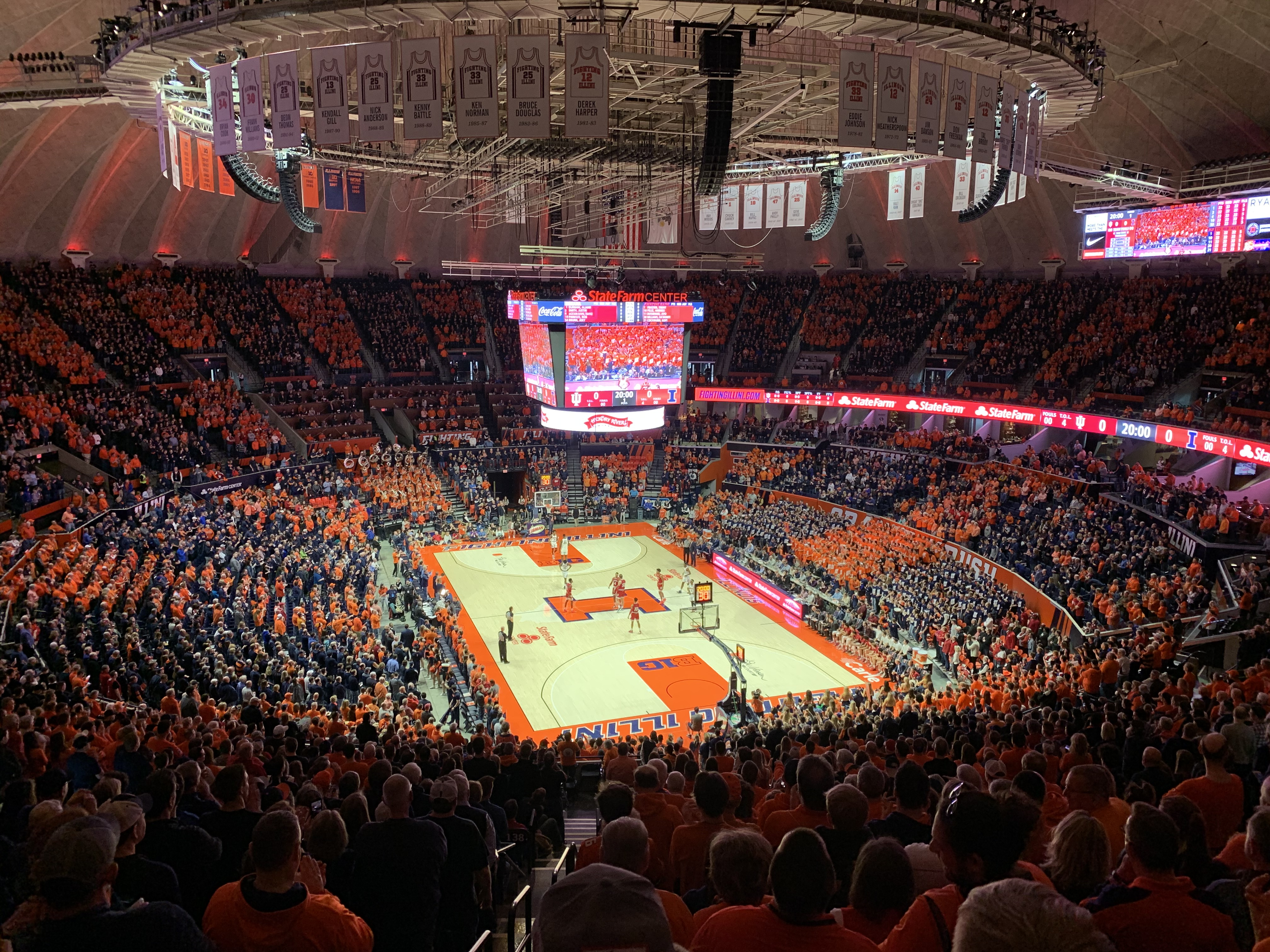
Lou Henson Court and interior of the State Farm Center

State Farm Center hosts home games of Illinois Fighting Illini men's basketball and Illinois Fighting Illini women's basketball and is also home to the student cheering section, the "Orange Krush," which occupies the floor around the court as well as some seats.

At the annual "Paint the Hall Orange" game, everyone in attendance would wear an orange shirt. In recent years, however, it has become customary for Illini fans to wear orange at all home games and so the official "PTHO" game was discontinued after the 2007–08 season.

In August 2015, prior to the reopening of the newly renovated State Farm Center, the hardwood floor was dedicated and named Lou Henson Court in honor of the Illinois Fighting Illini men's basketball all-time leader in victories Lou Henson.

=== IHSA ===
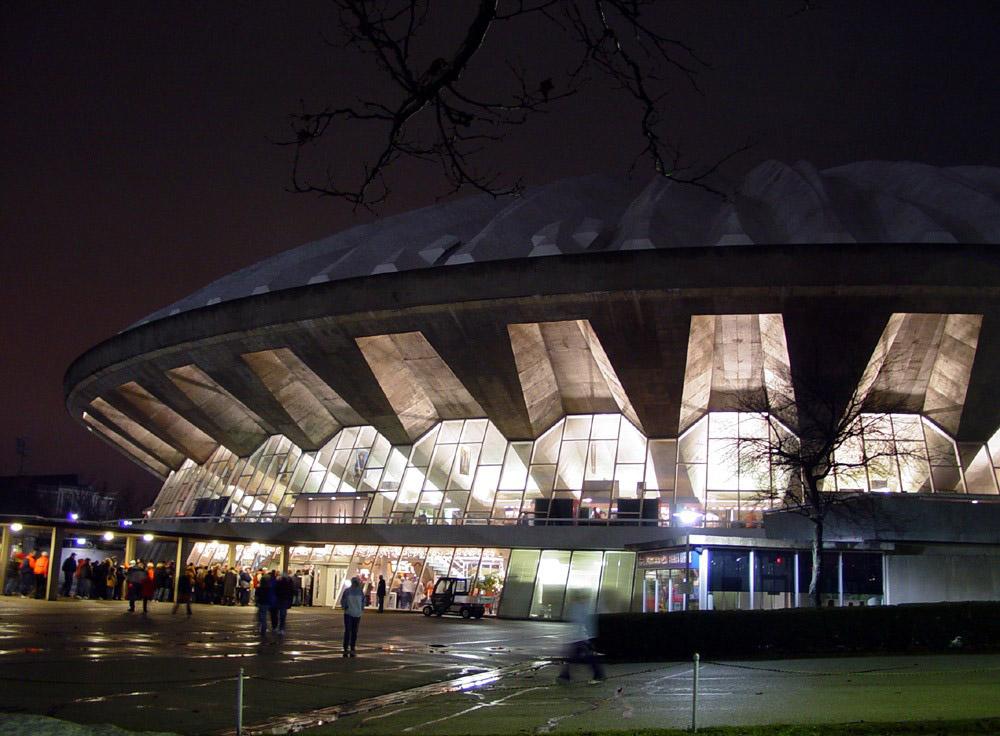
Nighttime exterior in 2006

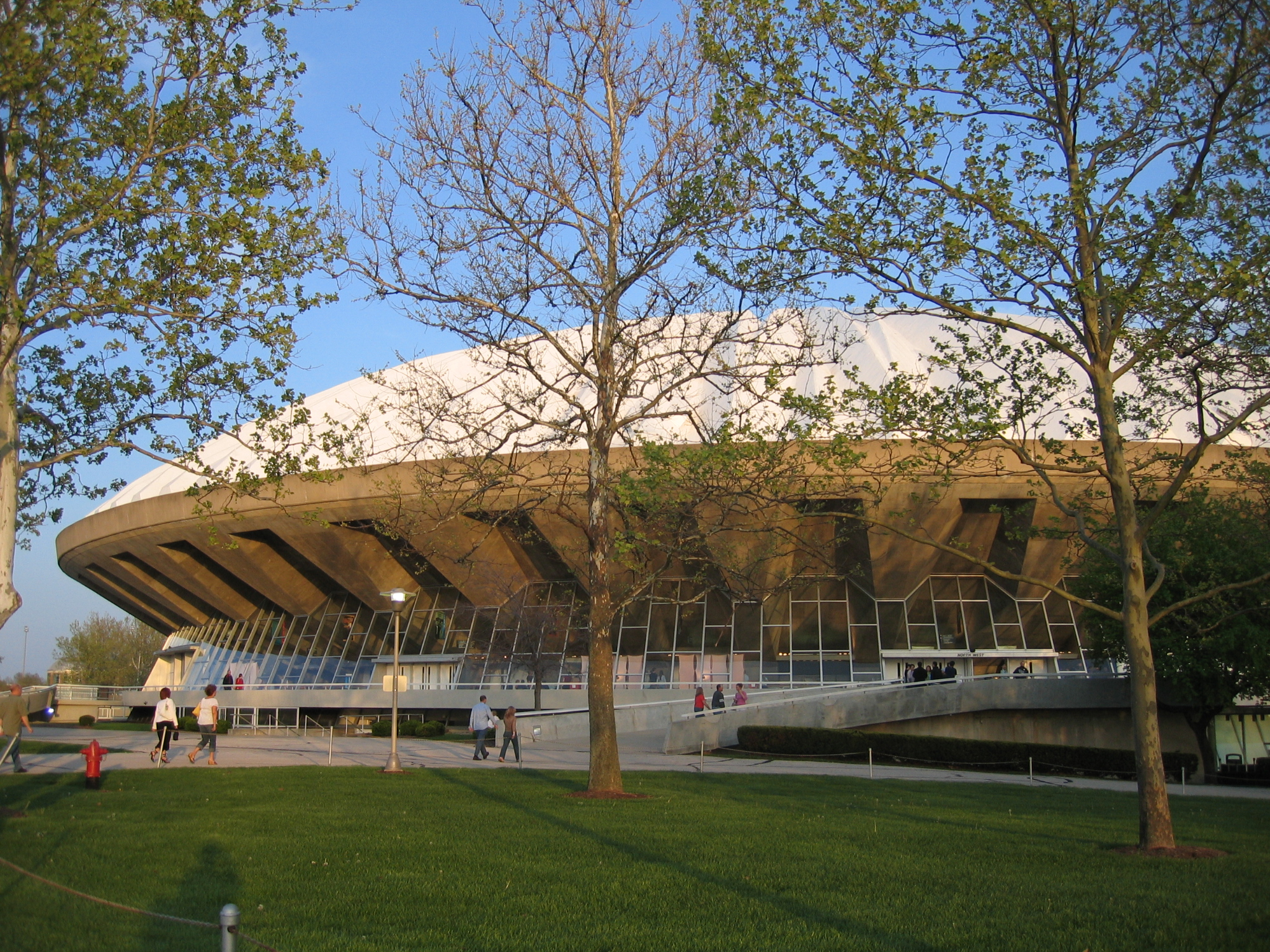
Daytime exterior in 2006

State Farm Center has hosted a variety of Illinois High School Association events. It has been the home of the state individual wrestling tournament since 1967. From 1963 to 1995, State Farm Center played host to the state finals of the boys' basketball tournament. From 1978 to 1991, it also hosted the IHSA girls' basketball tournament. The IHSA announced on June 15, 2020, that the boys' basketball tournament would return after a 25-year absence.

=== Broadway Series ===
State Farm Center is also the venue for the annual WCIA 3 Broadway Series, which features popular musicals such as Les Misérables, Miss Saigon, Rent, and Fiddler on the Roof.

=== Concerts ===
The largest concerts by attendance thus far are:

No.	Entertainer	Date	Attendance
1	Garth Brooks	March 7–9, 1997	49,000 (total)
2	Elvis Presley	October 22, 1976	17,117
3	Johnny Cash	October 4, 1969	
4	Garth Brooks	March 11, 1992	
5	REO Speedwagon	April 21, 1981	
6	Def Leppard	October 16, 1988	
7	Kenny Chesney	April 5, 2019	
8	The Rolling Stones	November 15, 1969	
9	Phish	Nov. 19, 1997	
10	U2	October 22, 1987	

=== Other uses ===
State Farm Center is used for various welcome events for incoming University of Illinois Urbana-Champaign freshman and transfer students. It additionally hosts the commencement ceremonies for local high schools, including Champaign Centennial, Champaign Central, Mahomet-Seymour, and Urbana.

== "Illinois Renaissance" renovation ==
In the autumn of 2008, school officials, led by Athletics Director Ron Guenther, conducted a study to decide whether to refurbish the then-named Assembly Hall or build a new basketball arena. In 2010, the university opted to renovate the existing structure designed by University of Illinois alumnus Max Abramovitz, and selected the architectural firm AECOM to design the renovation. The athletic department sent surveys to I-Fund and season ticket holders to gauge demand for various premium seating options. Architects used this information to create schematic drawings and architectural renderings near the end of 2012, which then Athletics Director Mike Thomas used to aid in fundraising for the project. The anticipated renovation cost was between $150 and $160 million, and construction would not start before spring of 2014. As part of the renovations, State Farm Insurance purchased the naming rights to the arena for $60 million over 30 years.

The State Farm Center began renovations after the 2013–14 men's basketball season. Work included adding luxury suites, club/loge seating, new blue seats included in the renovation. In the luxury suites and club level seats, there would be concessions where alcoholic beverages would be served as well as a buffet area. The total budget for the renovation was estimated at $169.5 million.

The construction process did cause some conflicts with scheduled sporting events at the beginning of the 2015-16 basketball season. The men's basketball team played the first five games of the 2015 at the Prairie Capital Convention Center in Springfield, while the 2015 Women's basketball team played their first five games at Parkland College. The renovated arena hosted its first game on December 2, when the Fighting Illini fell to Notre Dame 84–79.

=== Naming rights ===
The following corporate sponsor, Fighting Illini benefactors, former Illinois Fighting Illini men's basketball players, and University of Illinois Urbana-Champaign alumni have donated sizeable contributions towards the $169.5 million renovation cost of the State Farm Center.

Donor	Donation	Affiliation	Naming right
State Farm Insurance	$60 million over 30 years	Corporate sponsorship	State Farm Center
John Giuliani	$5 million	Alumnus	Traditions Club
Mannie Jackson	$3 million	Former player	University of Illinois Basketball Hall of Fame
Dave Downey	$2 million	Former player	Courtside Club
Timothy and Sharon Ubben	$2 million	Benefactors	Donor Recognition Wall
Jim Benson	$2 million	Alumnus	Legacy Club
Orange Krush Foundation	$1 million	Student Organization	Orange Krush Club
John Penicook family	$1 million	Alumni	West Horseshoe Drive
Phillip and Heidi Sarnecki	$500,000	Alumni	Men's Coaches Locker Room
Dennis D. Swanson family	$500,000	Alumnus	Illini Media Center
H. D. Smith Foundation	$500,000	Alumnus	Sports Medicine Facility
Jeffrey Kautz family	$250,000	Alumnus	Dining Room

== Historical Fighting Illini home courts ==
- Kenney Gym (1905–1925) located on the campus of the University of Illinois and is named after Harold E. (Hek) Kenney. The arena opened in 1890 and was originally known as the Men's Gym Annex.
- Huff Hall (1925–1963) opened in 1925 and was known as Huff Gymnasium until the 1990s. It is named after George Huff, who was the school's athletic director from 1895 to 1935.
- Assembly Hall/State Farm Center (1963–present)

== Fighting Illini Men's basketball records ==
=== Attendance ===
Season	Wins	Losses	Win pct.	Total attendance	NCAA rank	Sellouts
1962–63	2	0	1.000	32,144	—N/a	0
1963–64	7	3	.700	143,650	—N/a	1
1964–65	9	1	.900	115,256	—N/a	2
1965–66	7	3	.700	79,661	—N/a	0
1966–67	8	1	.889	73,654	—N/a	0
1967–68	4	5	.444	80,203	—N/a	0
1968–69	12	0	1.000	165,254	—N/a	5
1969–70	7	4	.636	157,206	1st	5
1970–71	6	5	.545	177,408	1st	11
1971–72	7	3	.700	136,972	5th	0
1972–73	10	1	.909	109,433	NR	0
1973–74	4	7	.364	72,949	NR	0
1974–75	5	7	.417	96,773	NR	0
1975–76	11	4	.733	106,444	NR	1
1976–77	10	4	.714	106,139	NR	0
1977–78	9	5	.643	122,071	NR	0
1978–79	7	6	.538	184,715	8th	5
1979–80	14	5	.737	271,374	8th	6
1980–81	12	2	.857	217,330	7th	9
1981–82	12	4	.750	244,908	8th	6
1982–83	13	2	.867	194,384	11th	0
1983–84	14	1	.933	194,145	13th	3
1984–85	15	0	1.000	235,736	6th	7
1985–86	12	3	.800	200,205	10th	5
1986–87	13	2	.867	227,641	10th	5
1987–88	13	3	.813	245,895	12th	7
1988–89	17	0	1.000	262,215	10th	9
1989–90	13	1	.929	224,443	11th	4
1990–91	12	4	.750	217,003	16th	1
1991–92	11	5	.688	207,995	22nd	0
1992–93	12	4	.750	213,949	22nd	3
1993–94	15	1	.938	240,301	11th	5
1994–95	11	3	.786	221,772	10th	5
1995–96	10	6	.625	236,674	12th	5
1996–97	12	2	.857	193,364	16th	3
1997–98	13	1	.929	191,689	19th	5
1998–99	5	8	.385	171,246	23rd	1
1999–00	12	1	.923	189,507	15th	3
2000–01	12	0	1.000	185,630	13th	8
2001–02	13	1	.929	226,480	11th	12
2002–03	14	0	1.000	212,303	13th	8
2003–04	12	1	.923	208,935	9th	8
2004–05	15	0	1.000	245,807	7th	13
2005–06	15	1	.938	265,888	9th	16
2006–07	14	3	.824	282,506	10th	17
2007–08	7	8	.467	249,270	11th	15
2008–09	14	3	.824	263,477	13th	5
2009–10	13	5	.722	267,658	12th	7
2010–11	14	2	.875	253,623	10th	8
2011–12	13	4	.765	254,595	14th	1
2012–13	12	4	.750	237,077	17th	6
2013–14	10	6	.625	243,931	15th	5
2014–15	14	2	.875	234,435	15th	5
2015–16	6	7	.462	165,409	27th	0
2016–17	14	5	.737	216,257	30th	2
2017–18	12	6	.667	227,051	25th	1
2018–19	9	6	.600	194,018	23rd	1
2019–20	15	3	.833	234,730	24th	5
2020–21	11	2	.846	2,164	—N/a	0
2021–22	13	3	.813	235,044	13th	8
2022–23	15	2	.882	256,539	9th	12
2023–24	15	3	.833	269,827	12th	11
2024–25	13	4	.765	256,543	11th	12
Totals	701	197	.781	12,250,906		308

- High attendance for game: 17,087 (Illinois 64, Michigan 52, 2/12/2015)
- Low attendance for game: 3,016 (Illinois 90, North Dakota State 73, 12/8/1975)
- High attendance for season: 282,506, 2006-07 (17 games, 16,618 avg.)
- Low attendance for season: 72,949, 1973-74 (11 games, 6,632 avg.)
- Consecutive sellouts: 60, (12/1/2005 - 3/8/2008)
- Most sellouts in a season: 17 (2006–07)

=== Individual single game ===
- Most points

Overall – 50, Von McDade, Wisconsin-Milwaukee...12/3/1990
Illini player – 46, Andy Kaufmann...12/3/1990

- Most field goals

Overall – 19, Rudy Tomjanovich, Michigan...2/22/1969
Illini player – 17, Andy Kaufmann...12/1/1990 & Eddie Johnson...12/8/1979

- Most field goal attempts

Overall – 44, Von McDade, Wisconsin-Milwaukee...12/3/1990
Illini player – 34, Nick Weatherspoon...1/27/73

- Best field goal accuracy (10 shot minimum)

Overall (Illini player) – 11/11, Derek Harper...2/19/1983
Illini player – 10/10, Ken Norman...12/14/1985

- Most three-point goals

Overall – 9, Von McDade, Wisconsin-Milwaukee...12/3/1990
Illini player – 8, Alfonso Plummer...2/24/2022, Brandon Paul...1/10/2012, Trenton Meacham...11/19/2006, & Dee Brown...3/3/2005

- Most three-point field goal attempts

Overall – 22, Von McDade, Wisconsin-Milwaukee...12/3/1990
Illini player – 16, Kevin Turner...1/3/1998

- Best three-point field goal accuracy (5 attempts minimum)

Overall (Illini player) – 5/5, Jamar Smith...12/6/2006
Illini player – 5/5, Sean Harrington...11/26/2000

- Most free throws

Overall – 17, Wayne Radford, Indiana...3/2/1978
Illini player – 17, Kiwane Garris...3/5/1997

- Best free throw accuracy (10 attempts minimum)

Overall – 14/14, C. J. Kupec, Michigan...1/2/1975
Illini player - 13/13, Kendall Gill...2/8/1990

- Most rebounds

Overall – 23, Joe Franklin, Wisconsin...12/19/1966
Illini player – 23, Nick Weatherspoon...3/2/1971

- Most assists

Illini player – 15, Bruce Douglas...12/14/1985

- Most steals

Overall – 7, Delfincko Bogan, UT Martin...11/12/2017
Illini player – 7, Kendall Gill...3/4/1990, Kenny Battle...3/9/1988 & Bruce Douglas...12/8/1986

- Most blocks

Illini player – 11, Derek Holcomb...12/8/1978

- Most minutes

Illini player – 60, Bruce Douglas...1/28/84

== See also ==
- List of NCAA Division I basketball arenas
