= Efrem Winters =

American basketball player (1963–2025)

Personal information
- Born: December 19, 1963 Chicago, Illinois, U.S.
- Died: January 27, 2025 (aged 61) Aurora, Illinois, U.S.
- Listed height: 6 ft 9 in (2.06 m)
- Listed weight: 240 lb (109 kg)

Career information
- High school: Chicago King (Chicago, Illinois)
- College: Illinois (1982–1986)
- NBA draft: 1986: 4th round, 88th overall pick
- Drafted by: Atlanta Hawks
- Position: Power forward
- Number: 24

Career highlights
- All-Big Ten (1984); First-team Parade All-American (1982); McDonald's All-American Game MVP (1982)
- Stats at Basketball Reference

Efrem Zimbalist Winters (December 19, 1963 – January 27, 2025) was an American college basketball player for the Illinois Fighting Illini. At a height of 6 feet 9 inches (2.06 m) tall, he played at the power forward position.

== High school ==
A native of Chicago, Illinois, Winters attended King High School from 1978 to 1982. After completing high school, Winters was named a Parade Magazine All-American, and additionally named to the West squad of the 1982 McDonald's All-American Team. At the conclusion of the game, Winters had scored 19 points and was named the Most Valuable Player (MVP).

== Career ==
Winters was recruited to play college basketball at the University of Illinois at Urbana–Champaign after high school and was a member of the varsity from 1982 to 1986. He played in 129 of 130 games during his four years at Illinois, missing only one game during his freshman year. Winters was the starting power forward for all four seasons. During his freshman season, Winters played alongside future NBA great Derek Harper as well as Illinois' all-time leader in steals and assists, guard Bruce Douglas, freshman guard Doug Altenberger, freshman forward Scott Meents, sophomore forward George Montgomery and sophomore forward Anthony Welch to form the nucleus for a team that would advance to the NCAA tournament every year. Winters started all four years at Illinois and made an immediate impact, setting freshman school records for scoring, rebounding and games started. Winters finished the season as the team leader in rebounds and blocked shots while finishing second to Harper in scoring. The Illini finished the season with an overall record of 21–11 and a conference record of 11–7, fourth place in the Big Ten Conference and a berth in the 1983 NCAA Division I men's basketball tournament. Winters' Illini team was a #7 seed and placed in the West Region, where they lost in the first round to Utah.

As a sophomore during the 1983–84 season, Winters enjoyed the most successful season as a member of the Fighting Illini. Individually, Winters led the team in scoring while being second in blocked shots and rebounding to teammate George Montgomery. The team finished ranked #6 in the nation with an overall record of 26–5 and a Big Ten record of 15–3, which placed them in a tie for the conference championship with tenth-ranked Purdue. After the end of the regular season, Illinois advanced to the NCAA tournament, playing in the Mideast Regional. The Illini defeated Villanova and Maryland before being eliminated by Kentucky at Rupp Arena, during which Winters played on a sprained ankle suffered in the Maryland win. Illinois' loss to Kentucky would cause the NCAA to initiate a rule not allowing a school to host a tournament game on its own court. At the conclusion of the season, Winters was named to the Big Ten's all-conference first team.

In his junior season of 1984–85, the Fighting Illini started the season with 11 wins and only 2 losses prior to the Big Ten opener against Minnesota, reaching an overall ranking of #4 in the nation. However, the team would falter and lose its next two games, dropping them in the conference standings and a national ranking of #15 in the nation. Winters, on the other hand, would not be able to recreate the same magical sophomore season results, finishing third on the team in scoring, but first in blocked shots and rebounding. The Illini would finish the season 26–9 overall and 12–6 in the conference, second to Michigan. After the season, Winters was named third team All-Big Ten and was also dubbed a team captain for his senior season. The Illini would once again garner a berth in the NCAA tournament, this time placed in the East Regional as a #3 seed. The Illini defeated the Northeastern Huskies in the first round and the Georgia Bulldogs in the second round before being eliminated by Georgia Tech in the East Regional Semi-Final.

During Winters' senior season, the Illini continued their winning ways for 1985–86 by winning 10 of their first 12 games, including the Braggin' Rights game played against Missouri. Overall Illinois would finish the season with its fourth consecutive 20+ winning campaign by holding a 22 and 10 record while finishing fourth in the Big Ten with a 11 and 7 record, losing twice to Bob Knight and the Indiana Hoosiers. During the season the team would win the Illini Classic and finish the year with an AP ranking of number 19. Winters and the Illini would gain a fourth consecutive bid to the NCAA tournament, receiving a #4 seed in the Southeast Regional. After defeating Fairfield in the first round, the Illini would lose to Wimp Sanderson and the Alabama Crimson Tide in the second round. After the season, Winters would be named honorable mention All-Big Ten while finishing third on the team in scoring and blocked shots and second on the team in rebounding behind Ken Norman. During his playing time at Illinois, Winters' teams would win 95 of 130 games, winning 73% of the time and make the NCAA tournament each year.

Winters finished his Illinois career as the school's all-time rebounding leader with 853 rebounds (since eclipsed and now holds third) and #3 all-time scorer. He started 120 games in his Illinois career, a school record not surpassed until 2002 by Cory Bradford. Winters helped to start Illinois' nearly annual appearance in the NCAA Tournament. The Douglas-to-Winters alley-oop became a staple play of the Illinois offense.

Winters was invited to tryouts for the men's basketball team in preparation for the 1984 Summer Olympics, but did not make the first cut of 32 players. He was selected in the fourth round of the 1986 NBA Draft by the Atlanta Hawks as the 88th overall pick, but was cut during the preseason and never played in the league. He attempted to play in the LNB Pro A in France, but he was released and returned to Chicago.

== Personal life and death ==
Winters was named after Efrem Zimbalist Jr. at the suggestion of his older sister who had a crush on the actor.

Winters worked for a construction company after his basketball career. On January 27, 2025, he died at age 61 of an undisclosed illness. He had been retired and living in Aurora, Illinois, at the time of his death.

== Honors ==
=== High school ===
- Parade Magazine All-American (1982)
- McDonald's All-American (1982)
- Inducted into the Illinois Basketball Coaches Association's Hall of Fame as a player. (1997)

=== College ===
- First-team All-Big Ten (1984)
- Third-team All-Big Ten (1985)
- Team Captain (1986)

== College statistics ==
Season	Games	Points	PPG	Field Goals	Attempts	Avg	Free Throws	Attempts	Avg	Rebounds	Avg	Assists	APG	Blocks	BPG
1982–83	31	385	12.4	159	343	.464	67	94	.713	213	6.9	20	0.6	31	1.0
1983–84	31	456	14.7	182	354	.514	92	120	.767	205	6.6	54	1.7	21	0.7
1984–85	35	350	10.0	137	289	.474	76	103	.738	252	7.2	49	1.4	32	0.9
1985–86	32	296	9.44	124	235	.528	48	81	.593	183	5.7	40	1.3	19	0.6
Totals	129	1487	11.5	602	1221	.493	283	398	.711	853	6.6	163	1.3	103	0.8
