= Neal Russo =

Neal Russo creates a sportsword puzzle.

Aniello "Neal" Russo (June 12, 1920 – March 6, 1996) was an American sportswriter.

Russo was one of 14 children born to Italian immigrants and grocers Thomasina and Pietro Russo in Farrell, Pennsylvania. He graduated from Farrell High School in 1938, and later from the University of Pittsburgh at the top of his class.

During World War II, he served in the 434th Fighter Squadron in United States Army Air Forces, primarily at RAF Wattisham. He wrote the 479th Fighter Group's newspaper, Kontak, for which pilot Robin Olds created cartoons.

After the war, Russo moved to St. Louis, Missouri and began a 43-year career at the St. Louis Post-Dispatch. He was on the St. Louis Browns beat for their final two seasons in St. Louis in 1952–1953. He succeeded Bob Broeg and preceded Rick Hummel on the St. Louis Cardinals beat from 1959 to 1978. His unconventional work practices and antics around the offices of the Post-Dispatch, Busch Stadium, and beyond included weight-loss challenges and stand-up comedy routines.

Russo moonlit as an official scorer and as a crossword puzzle writer. On April 6, 1978, he made a controversial call that resulted in Bob Forsch's first no-hitter.

He covered St. Louis Flyers hockey, boxing, and youth sports. In addition to his work with the Post-Dispatch, he contributed to Sports Illustrated and The Sporting News.

Russo died of congestive heart failure on March 6, 1996, in St. Louis. He was posthumously inducted to the St. Louis Amateur Baseball Hall of Fame in 2002.
