= Dev Reeves =

American soccer player

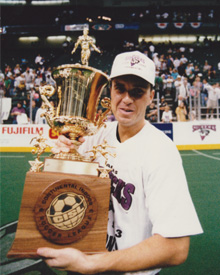

Personal information
- Full name: Devlin L. Reeves
- Date of birth: March 6, 1967 (age 59)
- Place of birth: Quincy, Illinois, United States
- Height: 6 ft 0 in (1.83 m)
- Position: Defender

College career
Years	Team	Apps	(Gls)
1986–1989	Quincy College	71	(22)

Senior career*
Years	Team	Apps	(Gls)
1989–1990	Cleveland Crunch (indoor)	39	(1)
1991–1992	Jonsereds IF (outdoor)		
1992	St. Louis Atoms		
1992–1994	St. Louis Ambush (indoor)	60	(8)
1993–1995	Dallas Sidekicks (indoor)	44	(9)
1995–1996	St. Louis Ambush (indoor)	5	(1)
- * Club domestic league appearances and goals

Devlin "Dev" Reeves (born March 6, 1967) is an American former professional soccer defender who played in Europe and the United States.

== Youth ==
Born in Quincy, Illinois, Reeves graduated from Quincy Senior High School and Quincy University. Reeves was voted one of the top 25 players ever to play at Quincy University. During his senior year Reeves was selected to play in the Adidas Senior Bowl as one of the nation's top 30 players. Reeves was inducted into the Quincy Sr. High School Hall of Fame in 1995 and into the Quincy University Sports Hall of Fame in 2000. In September 2023, Reeves was selected to the Quincy High Schools All-Time Starting 11 as they celebrated the soccer programs 50th anniversary. Reeves played his youth and college soccer under the guidance of legendary coach Jack Mackenzie.

== Professional ==
Reeves was the 1989 #1 draft pick of the Chicago Power of the National Professional Soccer League. However, he signed as an undrafted free agent with the Cleveland Crunch of the Major Indoor Soccer League in July 1989. Despite playing thirty-nine games for the Crunch and placing 3rd on the MISL Rookie of the Year balloting, the team released him in June 1990. He then moved to Europe where he played for Jonsereds IF of the Södra Swedish First Division. In the summer of 1992, he played for the St. Louis Atoms in the amateur Budweiser Premier League. In December 1992, he signed with the St. Louis Ambush of the National Professional Soccer League. He played two winter indoor seasons with the Ambush. In the spring of 1993, Reeves signed with the Dallas Sidekicks of the Continental Indoor Soccer League for the summer indoor season. The Sidekicks won the 1993 CISL championship with Reeves scoring the Sidekicks first goal in the championship series against the San Diego Sockers. He remained with the Sidekicks through the 1995 season, but lost fourteen games of the 1994 season with a fracture to his vertebrae. Reeves sat out the 1994–1995 NPSL season. The Sidekicks waived him on July 22, 1995. In October 1995, Reeves rejoined the Ambush. He played only five games due to injuries before retiring.

== Post-playing career ==
Reeves is the president of IAC The Sports Group, a sales and marketing firm located in Frisco, Texas. He also serves as the color analyst for the Dallas Sidekicks and Dallas Cup television broadcasts on Time Warner Sports Channel. The Dallas Cup is regarded as the top youth soccer tournament in the world. The likes of Rooney, Beckham, Dempsey, Chicharito, and of late Adnan Januzaj, Jesse Lingard and Ross Barkley have all played in the Dallas Cup. Reeves has hosted the "Dev Reeves All-Star Soccer Camp" in his hometown of Quincy since 1986.
