= Quincy University =

Franciscan university in Quincy, Illinois, US

- Former names: St. Francis Solanus College and Seminary (1860–1873); St. Francis Solanus College (1873–1917); Quincy College (1917–1993)
- Motto: "Praeco Sum Magni Regis" (Latin)
- Motto in English: "I am the herald of the Great King"
- Type: Private college
- Established: 1860; 166 years ago
- Religious affiliation: Roman Catholic (Franciscan)
- President: Brian McGee
- Students: 1,163 (fall 2024)
- Undergraduates: 1,072 (fall 2024)
- Postgraduates: 91 (fall 2024)
- Location: Quincy, Illinois, U.S. 39.9407°N 91.3860°W
- Campus: Small city
- Colors: Brown and white
- Nickname: Hawks
- Sporting affiliations: NCAA Division II - GLVC
- Mascot: Victor E. Hawk
- Website: quincy.edu
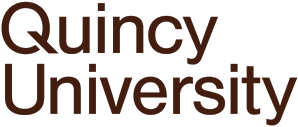

Quincy University (QU) is a private Franciscan college in Quincy, Illinois, United States. Founded in 1860, it has an enrollment of approximately 1,300 undergraduate and graduate students across five constituent schools.

== History ==
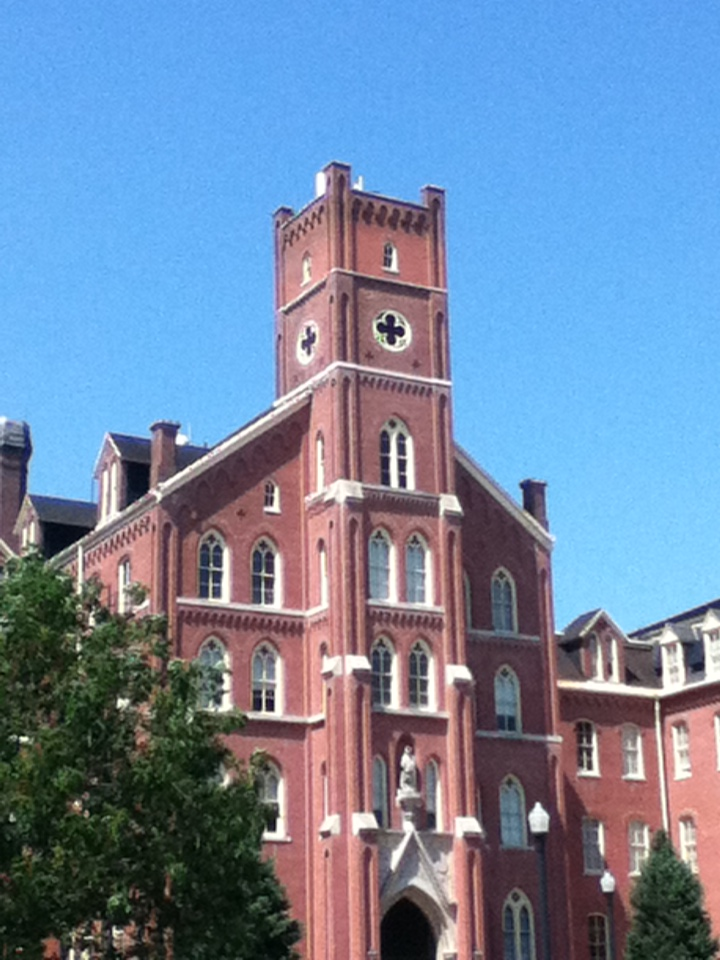
Francis Hall Tower

=== 1860s-1890s ===
A small group of Franciscan friars left Germany in 1858 to serve the German-speaking population in what was then the frontier state of Illinois. On February 6, 1860, they founded the institution as St. Francis Solanus College. This school was established at the corner of 8th and Maine Street. Under the leadership of Fr. Anselm Mueller, who served as president for a total of 37 years beginning in 1863, the institution moved to its current location on what is now College Avenue.

Quincy University was involved in educating Army reservists and Navy cadets during World War II, and enrollment grew after the Second World War. The institution first enrolled over 1,000 students in the late 1950s. In response to this enrollment growth, several new buildings were planned and put up during the 1950s and 1960s.

From its founding, Quincy University has embraced a deep commitment to the liberal arts while recognizing the importance of professional programs. The earliest course catalogs, from the 1870s, combined a strong focus on the liberal arts with courses in accounting and other "commercial" programs. Quincy University continues to offer majors in the liberal arts and in the professions.

=== 1900s-1990s ===
Quincy University typically enrolled under 300 students until the 1930s. The first woman enrolled at the institution in the 1920s, and women were regularly admitted beginning in 1932. From the 1870s until the 1950s, the great majority of campus courses and activities occurred in Francis Hall, a large building renowned for its beauty and strong German architectural influences.

Following two other name changes during the twentieth century, the current name, Quincy University, was adopted in 1993. The university name was used in part to recognize the addition of graduate programs.

The Franciscan friars made up the majority of the faculty until the late twentieth century. The distinctive Franciscan intellectual tradition remains central to the institution's mission and values. Since the founding of the institution, many Franciscan friars in the Midwest have been educated at Quincy University. Today, the institution is home to people of all faiths, who are welcomed in the Franciscan tradition of hospitality.

=== 2000s-present ===
In 2016 the institution announced that it was having significant financial issues. At the time of the announcement the school was running a $5 million deficit. A plan was developed to cut costs, and major donors helped get the institution past the crisis. In November 2018, the institution received $2.25 million from the U.S. Department of Education to expand students' access to science, technology, engineering and math.

In 2020, the institution initiated its distinctive Success by Design program, in which each undergraduate student completes and annually updates an individualized student success plan. The program also emphasizes high-impact learning experiences, such as undergraduate research and internships, along with multiple sources of mentoring and advising.

In 2021, the Oakley family of Quincy announced a $6.5 million gift to the institution which included naming of the Oakley School of Business. This gift is more than double the previous largest gift to the institution.

== Academics ==
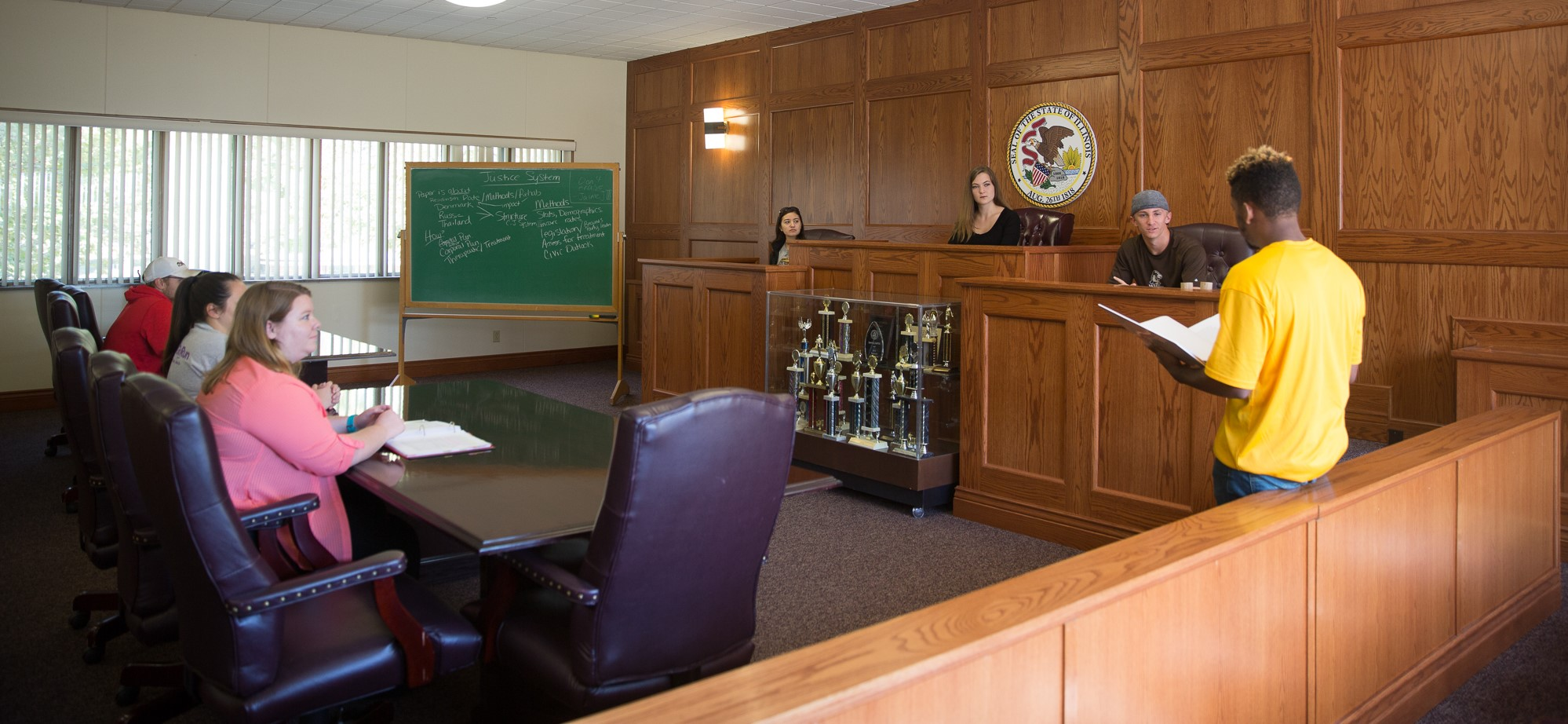
John 'Pete' Brown Mock Trial Courtroom

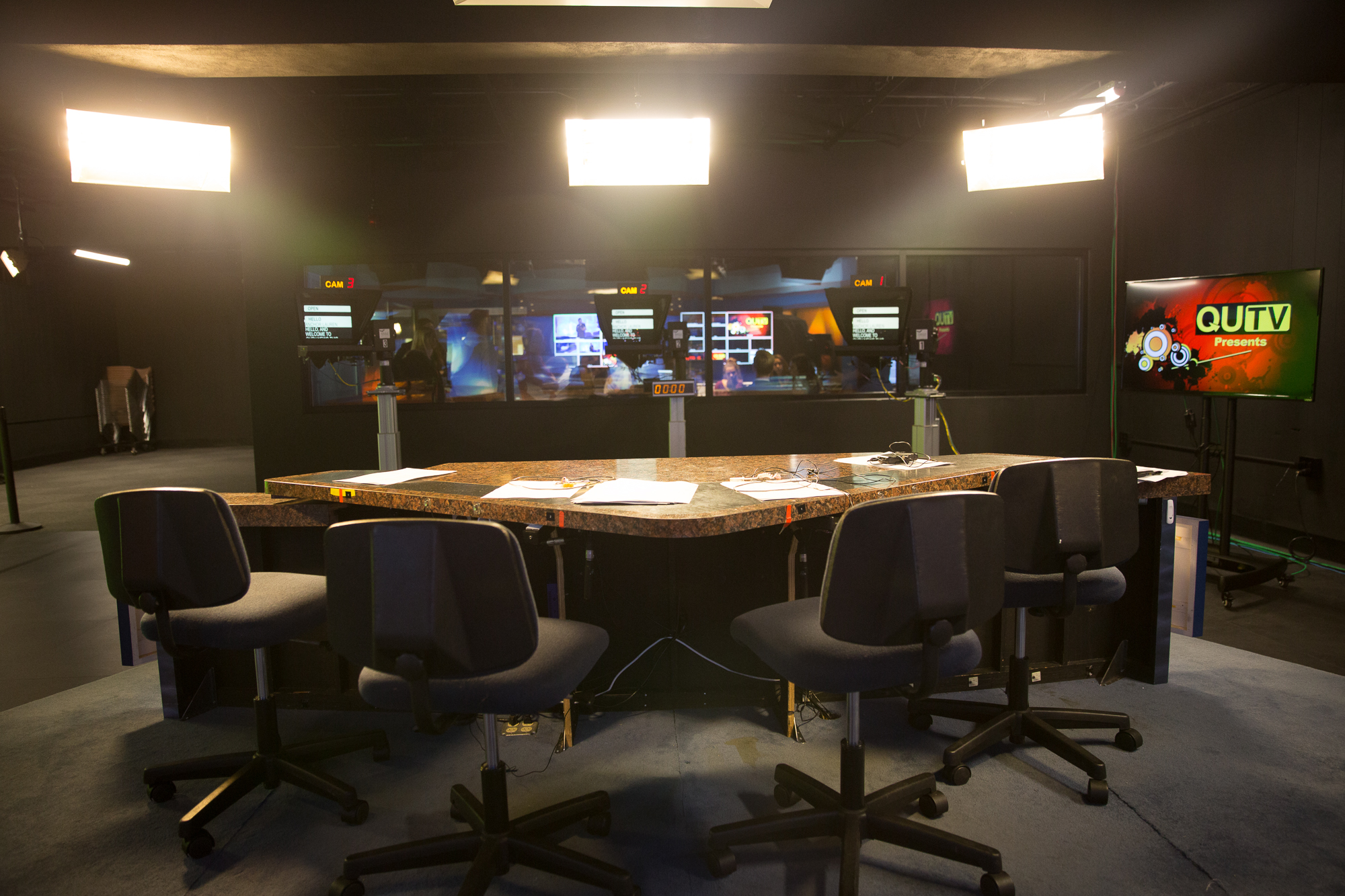
Quincy Media Inc. Broadcast Studio at QU's North Campus.

Quincy University is organized into five schools:

- School of Fine Arts & Communication
- School of Humanities
- School of Science and Technology
- Oakley School of Business
- School of Education & Human Services

At the undergraduate level, QU requires completion of the Bonaventure general education program, which includes a significant service requirement for all students. Bachelor of Science and Bachelor of Arts degrees are offered in 50 major areas of concentration. The institution also supports a variety of non-degree programs and multiple degree-completion options for non-traditional students. Courses are offered in traditional, online, or hybrid formats.

At the graduate level, QU offers a Master of Business Administration (MBA) degree, a Master of Science in education (M.S.Ed.) degree and a (M.S. Ed) Master of Science in education in counseling degree. The MBA degree is offered entirely online. Quincy University also offers two Doctoral programs, a Doctor of Occupational Therapy and a Doctor of Physical Therapy.

Classroom technologies and resources are tailored to the needs of specific academic programs. New or updated and renovated laboratories in computer science, cybersecurity, business analytics, biology, and chemistry are available, as is the John “Pete” Brown Mock Trial courtroom.

=== Accreditations ===
Quincy University is accredited by the Higher Learning Commission. QU also has specialized accreditation from the Council for Accreditation of Counseling and Related Educational Programs (CACREP).

== Campus ==
Quincy University's compact, walkable campus is located in a residential area, a few blocks away from Quincy's Broadway Avenue shopping and business district. Public transit service to campus is provided by Quincy Transit Lines.

Historic Francis Hall is at the center of campus and was built and expanded between 1871 and 1898. The campus also features distinctive examples of Mid-Century modern architecture in its residence halls and classroom and administration buildings. Friar's Field, a large lawn that held various athletic fields during the nineteenth and twentieth centuries, now creates a park-like setting for the campus. The newest additions to campus include a large health and fitness center and an apartment-style residence hall.

The historic campus holds several noteworthy traditional and contemporary public art installations. The Brenner Library includes the highly regarded Gray Gallery, which features art exhibitions throughout the year.

The chapel was built in 1911 and has been renovated on several occasions. The chapel design was shortened and modified to preserve the baseball field then located just to the north of Francis Hall.

A former Franciscan seminary is now part of Quincy University, just a few minutes to the north of the institution's historic campus. Now called the North Campus, this extensively renovated facility houses most of the Division of Science and Technology, the Connie Niemann Center for Music, and the Quincy Media Inc. television studio. The institution's soccer stadium and softball complex are located adjacent to the North Campus. The football stadium and baseball field are part of the main campus and feature distinctive limestone walls. The football and baseball facilities were built in the 1930s and have been extensively renovated.

Campus life at Quincy University involves several student clubs and activities, including three Greek-letter organizations. Greek houses are located on campus.

Each year, the Inaugural ceremony brings together faculty, staff, new students, and parents to celebrate the beginning of the college experience for new students. Following a procession by the faculty in academic regalia, the ceremony takes place in St. Francis Solanus Church, a Franciscan parish located across the street from Quincy University.

== Students and alumni ==
The student body at Quincy University is about 52% men and 48% women. Most students come from Illinois and Missouri, but several other states in the Midwest and South are well represented at QU. Over 15,000 Quincy University alumni live in all 50 states and 12 foreign countries.

== Athletics ==
Quincy University is a member of NCAA Division II and has been a part of the Great Lakes Valley Conference (GLVC) for most sports since the 1995–96 school year. Men's volleyball competes in the Midwestern Intercollegiate Volleyball Association as a de facto member of NCAA Division I. (Note: The top-level NCAA men's volleyball championship is open to members of both Divisions I and II. Members of both divisions compete under the same organizational rules and scholarship limits.) Sprint football, a weight-restricted form of American football that is not governed by the NCAA, will become QU's newest varsity sport in fall 2022. Several teams have had significant national success, with men's soccer winning 11 NAIA national championships.

== Notable alumni ==
- Venerable Augustine Tolton (1854–1897), first openly African-American Catholic priest
- Rick Hummel (1946–2023), Hall of Fame baseball writer
- Josh Kinney (b. 1979), relief pitcher for the Seattle Mariners
- John Mahoney (1940–2018), television and theatre actor
- Zoe Nicholson, equality activist, speaker and writer
- James Pankow (b. 1947), trombonist for the band Chicago
- Michael A. Perry (b. 1954), Minister General of the Order of Friars Minor
- Josh Rabe (b. 1978), former outfielder for the Minnesota Twins
- Dev Reeves (b. 1967), former professional soccer defender
- Lindell Shumake (b. 1949), Republican member of the Missouri House of Representatives
- Francis G. Slay (b. 1955), former mayor of St. Louis, Missouri
- Dietrich C. Smith (1840–1914), former Republican Congressman from Illinois
- John M. Sullivan (b. 1959), Illinois State Senator
- Michael Swango (b. 1954), prolific serial killer and physician
- Scott L. Thoele, U.S. Army National Guard general
- Mary Jo White (b. 1941), Pennsylvania State Senator
