= Jeff Allen (offensive lineman) =

American football player (born 1990)

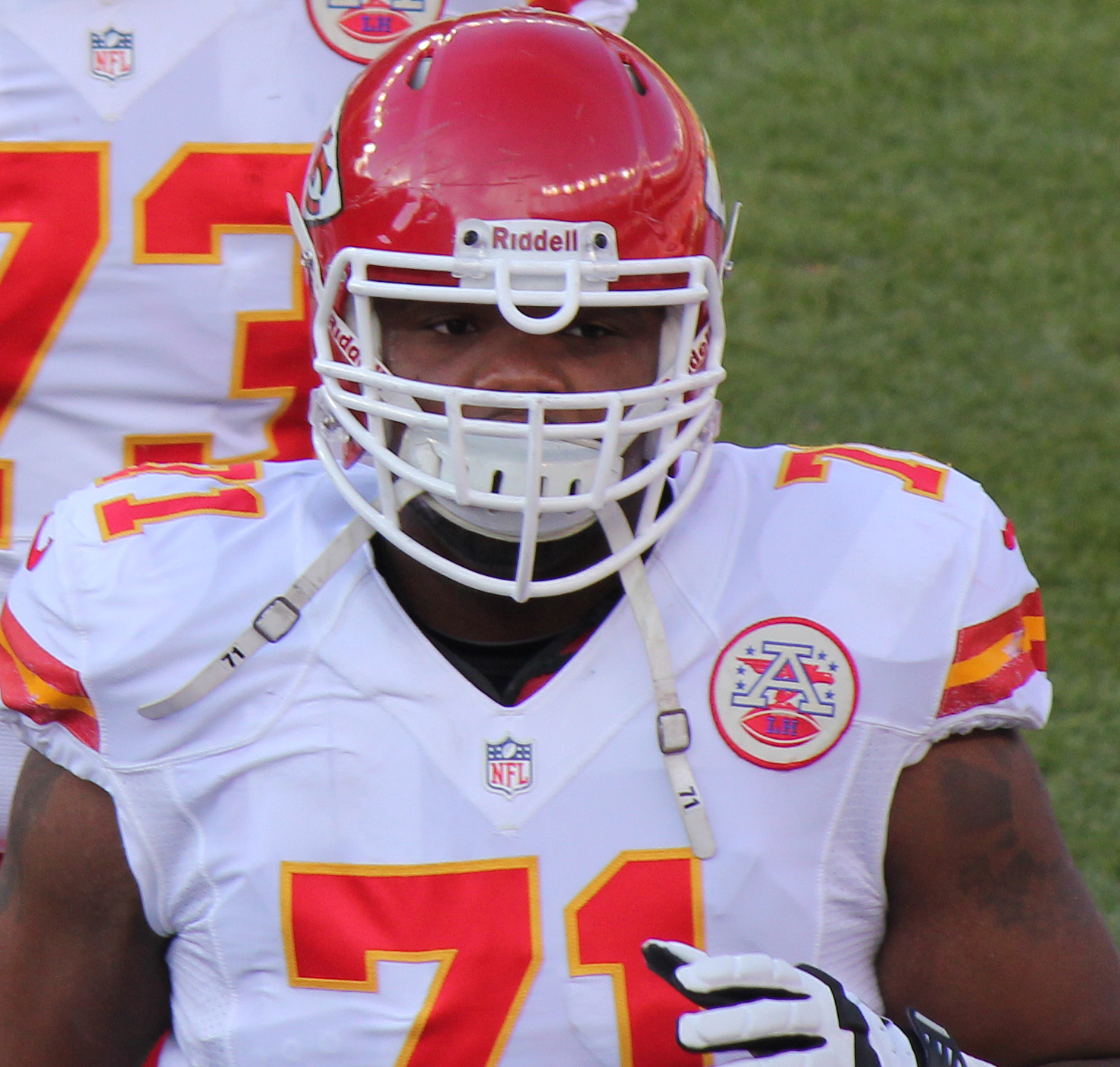
- Allen with the Kansas City Chiefs in 2012

No. 71, 79, 73
- Position: Guard

Personal information
- Born: January 8, 1990 (age 36); Chicago, Illinois, U.S.
- Listed height: 6 ft 4 in (1.93 m)
- Listed weight: 305 lb (138 kg)

Career information
- High school: King (Chicago)
- College: Illinois (2008–2011)
- NFL draft: 2012: 2nd round, 44th overall pick

Career history
- Kansas City Chiefs (2012–2015); Houston Texans (2016–2017); Kansas City Chiefs (2018–2019)

Awards and highlights
- 2× Second-team All-Big Ten (2010, 2011)

Career NFL statistics
- Games played: 84
- Games started: 66
- Stats at Pro Football Reference

Jeff Allen (born January 8, 1990) is an American former professional football player who was a guard in the National Football League (NFL). He played college football for the Illinois Fighting Illini. Allen was selected by the Kansas City Chiefs in the second round of the 2012 NFL draft. He also played for the Houston Texans.

== College career ==
After graduating from Chicago's King High School, Allen attended the University of Illinois at Urbana–Champaign from 2008 to 2011. He started 47 games at both left and right tackle during his career.

== Professional career ==
=== Pre-draft ===
Pre-draft measurables
Height	Weight	Arm length	Hand span	Wingspan	40-yard dash	10-yard split	20-yard split	20-yard shuttle	Three-cone drill	Vertical jump	Broad jump	Bench press
6 ft 3 7/8 in (1.93 m)	307 lb (139 kg)	33 1/2 in (0.85 m)	10 in (0.25 m)	6 ft 8 3/8 in (2.04 m)	5.28 s	1.87 s	3.09 s	4.79 s	7.57 s	27.5 in (0.70 m)	8 ft 6 in (2.59 m)	26 reps
All values from NFL Combine/Pro Day

Projected as a second round selection by Sports Illustrated, Allen was ranked as the No. 6 offensive guard available in the 2012 NFL draft.

=== Kansas City Chiefs (first stint) ===
Allen was selected by the Kansas City Chiefs in the second round, 44th overall. In his rookie season, he appeared in all 16 games, and became a starter at left guard by Week 4 against the San Diego Chargers. For his first two seasons with the Chiefs, he played with Jon Asamoah who was a teammate of Allen's at Illinois.

=== Houston Texans ===
On March 9, 2016, Allen signed a four-year contract with the Houston Texans.

On May 11, 2018, Allen was placed on the reserve/physically unable to perform list after dealing with concussions and ankle injuries. On July 13, 2018, Allen was released by the Texans after reaching an injury settlement.

=== Kansas City Chiefs (second stint) ===
On October 16, 2018, Allen signed with the Chiefs.

Allen was re-signed on August 20, 2019. He was released on October 3, 2019. He announced his retirement after the Chiefs won Super Bowl LIV. Despite not being on the roster when the Chiefs won the Super Bowl, he received a Super Bowl ring from the Chiefs.

== Personal life ==
Allen is married to Marissa Holden, a former Illinois soccer player. They have one daughter and son together.

In 2018, the couple founded The Cookie Society, a gourmet cookie shop based in Frisco, Texas.
