= Rick Hummel =

American journalist (1946–2023)

- Rick Hummel
- Born: Richard Lowell Hummel; February 25, 1946; Quincy, Illinois, U.S.
- Died: May 20, 2023 (aged 77); St. Louis, Missouri, U.S.
- Occupation: Sportswriter
- Employer: St. Louis Post-Dispatch
- Spouses: Connie Karr (before 2008); Melissa
- Children: 3
- Awards: J. G. Taylor Spink Award

Richard Lowell Hummel (February 25, 1946 – May 20, 2023) was an American author and sports columnist best known for his work for the St. Louis Post-Dispatch. Hummel was honored in 2007 with the J. G. Taylor Spink Award for baseball writing. Known throughout baseball by his nickname "The Commish", he was a former president of the Baseball Writers' Association of America.

== Early life ==
Richard Lowell Hummel was born on February, 25, 1946, in Quincy, Illinois. He graduated from Quincy Senior High School in 1964. At first Hummel remained in his hometown for higher education, attending Quincy College before transferring to the University of Missouri to attend their School of Journalism. Hummel expressed an interest in sports journalism and broadcasting at an early age, having auditioned for a job at Quincy station WGEM when he was twelve years old.

Hummel worked as a spotter for former Major League Baseball (MLB) player and coach Elvin Tappe and his twin brother Melvin as they broadcast Quincy High School games. Melvin Tappe encouraged Hummel to pursue a career as a sports writer. While attending the University of Missouri, Hummel returned home during two summers to work for the Quincy Herald-Whig. At Mizzou, he worked on the Sports Information department's statistics crew for football games alongside another future sports notable, John Walsh, now executive vice president and executive editor of ESPN.

== Professional career ==
Following graduation from the University of Missouri in 1968, Hummel served three years in the U.S. Army. While stationed in Colorado he also worked as a part-time employee for two years on the Colorado Springs Free Press-Sun. After his discharge from the Army in 1971, Hummel was hired by fellow Mizzou alum Bob Broeg to work for the St. Louis Post-Dispatch. Broeg, who himself would earn the Spink award and be inducted into Cooperstown in 1979, at first assigned Hummel to cover secondary and St. Louis regional teams for the newspaper. Hummel worked as a beat writer for the St. Louis Stars of the North American Soccer League, Spirits of St. Louis of the American Basketball Association, and Saint Louis University hockey, among others. Hummel earned his nickname "The Commish" or "The Commissioner" for running an APBA board game with colleagues and for his exhaustive knowledge of the rules involved in the softball, football, and bowling leagues he and Post-Dispatch teammates participated in.

The first of Hummel's big breaks at the Post-Dispatch came in 1973 when he covered around eight St. Louis Cardinals (MLB) home games for the newspaper, his first being a 1–0 rain-shortened victory over the Montreal Expos. Another milestone came in 1978 when long-time Cardinals beat writer Neal Russo was unable to make a trip to Cincinnati, Ohio. Hummel was sent in his place and ended up covering a historic game as Hall of Famer Tom Seaver pitched his only career no-hitter in a 4–0 victory for the Reds. In 1994 his peers elected Hummel President of the Baseball Writers' Association of America. He has also served on the Baseball Hall of Fame Overview Committee, reviewing the careers of potential inductees by the Veterans Committee. Hummel continued to work as the game-day beat reporter until 2002 when he transitioned to the primary role of weekly baseball columnist.

In 2007, Hummel won the J.G. Taylor Spink Award. He was inducted into the Missouri Sports Hall of Fame the following year. Hummel was a three-time "Missouri Sportswriter of the Year" as selected by the National Sportscasters and Sportswriters Association, and was inducted into the Quincy High School Blue Devils Hall of Fame.

In 2020, Hummel admitted he accidentally cast an MVP vote for relief pitcher Ryan Tepera by making an error in his selection on the online ballot.

== Personal life ==
Hummel had three children, one son and two daughters. One of Hummel's ex-wives, Connie Karr, the mother of his daughter Lauren, was one of five people murdered during the Kirkwood City Council shooting in February 2008. Hummel's last wife was Melissa.

Hummel died at his home on May 20, 2023, at the age of 77.

== Books ==
- 2012 – One Last Strike: Fifty Years in Baseball, Ten and a Half Games Back, and One Final Championship Season, written with Tony La Russa ISBN 978-0062207388
- 2007 – The Commish and the Cardinals: The Most Memorable Games, as Covered by Hall of Famer Rick Hummel for the St. Louis Post-Dispatch ISBN 9780966139792
- 1989 – Tom Seaver's Scouting Notebook written with Tom Seaver and Bob Nightengale ISBN 978-0892043019
