= Quincy Public School District 172 =

School district in Illinois, United States

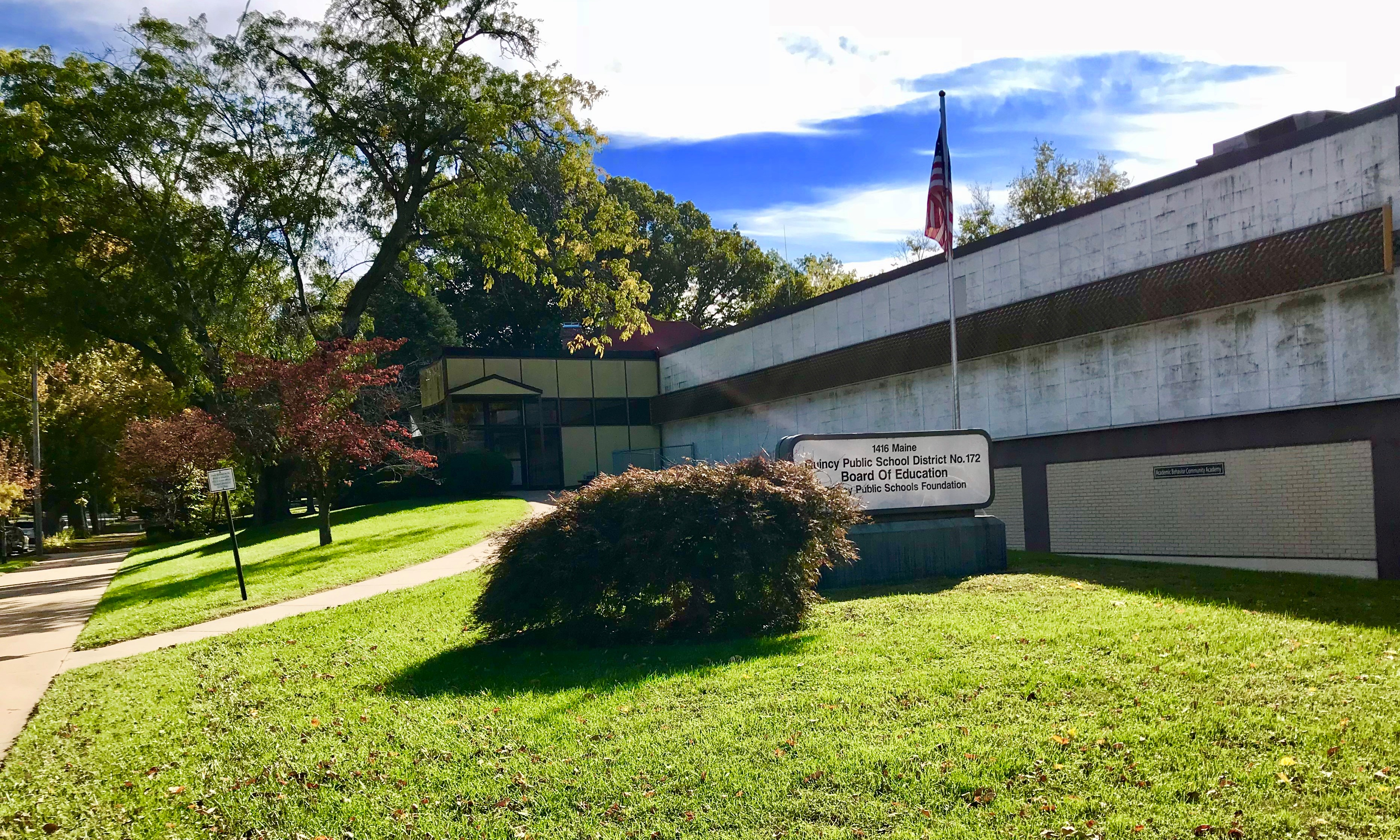
- Board of Education office

Address
- 1416 Maine St Quincy, Illinois, 62301; United States

District information
- Type: Public
- Grades: PreK–12
- NCES District ID: 1733000

Students and staff
- Students: 6,276 (2023–2024)
- Teachers: 387.61 (on an FTE basis)
- Student–teacher ratio: 16.19:1

Other information
- Website: www.qps.org

Quincy Public School District 172 is a school district based in Quincy, the county seat of Adams County, Illinois.

It is a large unit district located in west central Illinois. The QPS mission is to educate students and teachers to achieve personal excellence. QPS is a Pre K -12 district with more than 6,000 enrolled students. The district includes a Pre-K/Head Start school, five elementary schools for grades K-5, a junior high for grades 6–8, and a high school for grades 9–12. In November 2014, an 89 million dollar referendum for five new K-5 elementary schools and an expansion to the high school passed overwhelmingly in all voting districts. As a result, the district was able build five elementary schools for grades K-5 over the next few years, completing the projects in the summer of 2019. In the 2016–2017 academic year the district adopted a middle school model for grades 6–8, and a traditional high school for grades 9-12. In 2018-2019 the district transitioned to K-5 Learning Communities.
