= King College Prep =

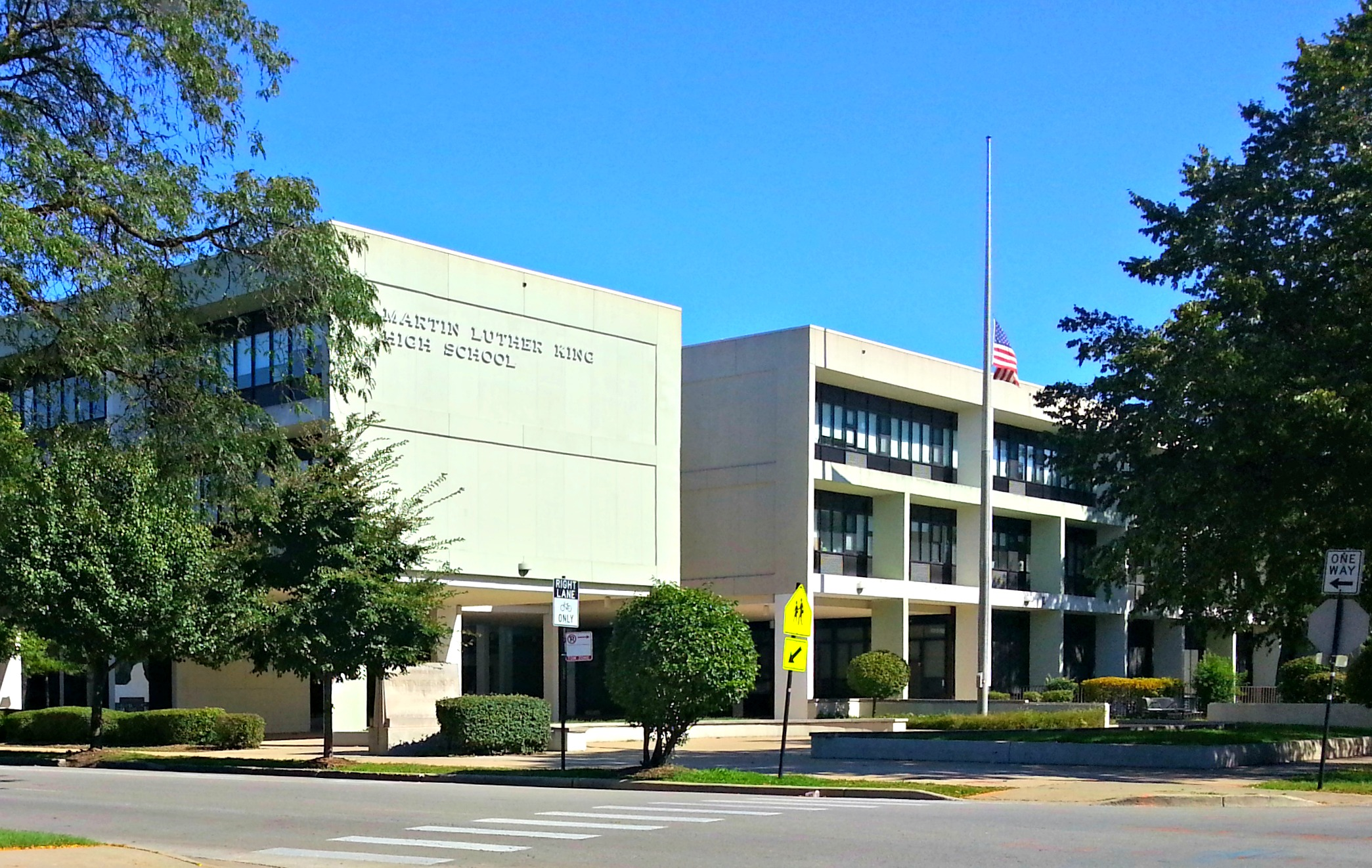

Location
- 4445 South Drexel Boulevard; Chicago, Illinois 60653; United States; 41.8138°N 87.6029°W

Information
- School type: Public; Secondary; Magnet
- Motto: "Dare to dream, Strive to achieve."
- Opened: 1971
- School district: Chicago Public Schools
- CEEB code: 140825
- Principal: Brian Kelly
- Grades: 9–12
- Gender: Coed
- Enrollment: 853 (2025–2026)
- Campus type: Urban
- Colors: Black; Gold
- Slogan: "One Team, One Dream, Jaguars!"
- Athletics conference: Chicago Public League
- Team name: Jaguars
- Accreditation: North Central Association of Colleges and Schools
- Yearbook: Black and Gold
- Website: newkcp.org

Dr. Martin Luther King, Jr. College Preparatory High School (commonly known as King College Prep) is a public 4–year selective enrollment magnet high school located in the Kenwood neighborhood on the south side of Chicago, Illinois, United States. Opened in 1971, The school is named for slain leader of the civil rights movement, Rev. Dr. Martin Luther King Jr. (1929–1968). Operated by the Chicago Public Schools district, King is one of the district's ten selective enrollment schools, which means that its students must apply for acceptance, based on academic achievement and test scores. In 2010, under then–principal Jeff Wright, King College Prep was named a "Silver Medal" school by U.S. News & World Report in its annual rankings of America's best high schools. During the 2016–2017 school year, the school was promoted to a level one plus rank school.

== History ==
The school was founded as Forrestville High School in 1964, which was located 4401 S. Saint Lawrence Avenue (less than a mile west of King's location). Housed in a former elementary school, School officials and community members requested to the Chicago Board of Education a new school building was needed to accommodate the increasing enrollment of Forrestville, which by 1968 was around 2,100. The school opened as Dr. Martin Luther King Jr. High School for a class of 650 summer school students on June 28, 1971. The school later opened for the 1971–1972 academic school year on September 8, 1971, with an enrollment of 1,800.

The school, which cost $7 million to construct, was officially dedicated to civil rights activist and minister Dr. Martin Luther King Jr. on October 17, 1971, by Chicago mayor Richard J. Daley, Chicago Public Schools superintendent James F. Redmond and the schools' principal Charles Almo. The school opened as a neighborhood high school, with most of the student body being from surrounding neighborhoods (which consisted of Kenwood, Grand Boulevard and Oakland) and the former Forrestville High School. King became a selective enrollment school during the 2000–2001 school year and was renamed Dr. Martin Luther King, Jr. College Preparatory High School.

== Curriculum and activities ==
Honors classes and Advanced Placement courses are offered in every subject area. College coursework is accessible through King's college and university partners. Advanced coursework is possible in Visual and Performing Arts (Band, Dance, Drama, Graphic Arts, Vocal Music). King's band and choir have represented Chicago at the Presidential Inaugural Heritage Music Festival in Washington D.C. In 2008, King's marching band opened for Stone Temple Pilots at their Chicago concert. In 2012, the King College Prep Marching Band again traveled to Washington D.C for the Presidential Inaugural Heritage Music Festival. The band and choir placed first in their divisions. In addition to placing first in their division, the band is also 4–time winners of the High School Battle of the Bands at the annual Chicago Football Classic.

== Athletics ==
King competes in the Chicago Public League (CPL) and is a member of the Illinois High School Association (IHSA). King's sport teams are known as the Jaguars. King's boys' basketball team were Class AA ten times (1985–86, 1986–87, 1987–88, 1988–89, 1989–90, 1991–92, 1992–93, 1993–94, 1997–98 and 1998–99) and public league champions six times (1985–86, 1986–87, 1987–88, 1988–89, 1989–90, 1992–93, 1993–94 and 1998–99) under the leadership of Landon "Sonny" Cox. And Regional Champions in 2020-21 Season Under Leadership of Culumber Ball. The girls' basketball team were regional champions in 2009–10. King's boys' wrestling team were regional champions three times (2009–10, 2010–11 and 2011–12). The boys' track and field were Class AA two times (1975–76 and 1976–77).

=== Boys' basketball ===
The boys' basketball team was dominant during the mid-1980s throughout the 1990s, produced numerous Illinois Mr. Basketball's, and were nationally ranked on a regular basis. 1982 graduate, Efrem Winters, was named MVP of that year's McDonald's All-American game. After a college career at Illinois, Winters was drafted by the NBA's Atlanta Hawks. Former NBA player Marcus Liberty, who was a member of the 1989 Illinois Flyin' Illini attended King and was widely regarded as the #1 player in the nation. In 1990, King won the Illinois state title, going 32–0, and was ranked #1 nationally behind star guard/forward Jamie Brandon. After initially committing to Illinois, Brandon went on to play alongside Shaquille O'Neal at LSU after the Ilini went on NCAA probation. He later played in France, Croatia, Finland and Honduras. In 1993, King had 7'2" Thomas Hamilton and 7'0" Rashard Griffith, who led the Jaguars to a state championship. Imari Sawyer played for King from 1996 to 2000 before starring at DePaul. All of these players were coached by outspoken Chicago legend Landon “Sonny” Cox.

== Notable alumni ==
- Jeff Allen (2008) – football player, NFL offensive lineman for the Houston Texans and Kansas City Chiefs.
- Michael Clarke Duncan (1976) – Academy Award–nominated actor (The Green Mile, Armageddon).
- Rashard Griffith (1993) – former professional basketball player (1995–2004) who predominantly played in European basketball leagues.
- Thomas Hamilton (1993) – a former NBA center.
- Marcus Liberty (1987) – former NBA forward (1990–94), who spent most of his NBA career with the Denver Nuggets.
- Hadiya Pendleton – a 15-year-old African–American girl who was a majorette in King's marching band that was fatally shot in the back in Chicago on January 29, 2013, about a week after performing at President Barack Obama's second inauguration. Outgoing White House Press Secretary and Treasury Secretary nominee Jacob Lew released a statement of condolence.
- Leon Smith (1999) – former basketball player.
- Efrem Winters (1982) – former basketball player.

== Notable staff ==
- Landon "Sonny" Cox – a jazz saxophone player who served as the school's head boys basketball coach.
