= Bruce Douglas (basketball) =

American basketball player (born 1964)

Personal information
- Born: April 9, 1964 (age 62) Quincy, Illinois
- Listed height: 6 ft 3 in (1.91 m)
- Listed weight: 195 lb (88 kg)

Career information
- High school: Quincy Senior (Quincy, Illinois)
- College: Illinois (1982–1986)
- NBA draft: 1986: 3rd round, 57th overall pick
- Drafted by: Sacramento Kings
- Position: Guard
- Number: 24

Career history
- 1986: Sacramento Kings
- 1986–1987: Rockford Lightning

Career highlights
- Third-team All-American – UPI (1984); Second-team Parade All-American (1982); McDonald's All-American (1982); Illinois Mr. Basketball (1982); 100 Legends of the IHSA Boys Basketball Tournament (2007)
- Stats at NBA.com
- Stats at Basketball Reference

Bruce Douglas (born April 9, 1964) is a retired American professional basketball player. A 6'3" guard, he played varsity basketball for Quincy Senior High School four years, and was a four-year starter at the University of Illinois. He also briefly played professionally with the Sacramento Kings and in the CBA.

== High school ==
Douglas played on the varsity basketball team at Quincy High School all four years he was in school. During his freshman year, he came off the bench, playing meaningful minutes for the team that finished second in the state with a 32–1 record. He started his sophomore, junior, and senior seasons, and led the Blue Devils to their most successful seasons in the history of the program. He led the team in scoring his sophomore year with 19.4 points per game. His junior year, the Blue Devils went undefeated, won the state championship, and were named national champions. He was named to both all-state and All-America teams, while leading the team in assists. Douglas nearly led the team to another undefeated season his senior year. The team finally lost the 1982 semifinal game, after a then-state record 64-game winning streak. The team ended up with a third-place trophy, Douglas's third top-four state finish in his four years. He was once again named to all-state teams, and was a Parade Magazine all-American. He was named Mr. Basketball in the state of Illinois in 1982. He finished among the leaders in every statistical category at Quincy High school. He holds the record for points scored (2,040) and field goals made (890), and is third in rebounds (709) and assists (643). He amassed an amazing 123–5 win–loss record during his four years at QHS. Out of high school, he was recruited to play for Lou Henson at the University of Illinois. In 2007, Douglas was voted one of the "100 Legends of the IHSA Boys Basketball Tournament," recognizing his superior performance in his appearances in the tournament.

== College ==
Douglas started all four years he played at the University of Illinois. He ran the show at point guard to four consecutive NCAA tournament appearances. In the 1983–84 season, the Illini won the Big Ten championship, and went to the elite eight. The team came just short of its first final four since 1952, losing a controversial game to the University of Kentucky, which was played in Rupp Arena. Douglas finished a successful career with Illinois, ending up a leader in many statistical categories. As of 2019, Douglas is 27th on the list of Illinois leading scorers with 1261 points. His record for most minutes played was surpassed by Dee Brown in 2006. He still holds the Illini record for career steals (324) and assists (765). He earned first-team All Big Ten honors in 1984, second-team in '85 and '86, and honorable mention in '83. He was a third-team all-American in 1984, and was the Big Ten Defensive Player of the Year in 1985 and '86. In October 2004, Douglas was named to the Illinois All-Century Team. Illinois fans voted him as one of the 20 best Fighting Illini basketball players in the 100-year history of the program.

== Professional ==
Out of college, Douglas was selected in the third round of the 1986 NBA draft, going to the Sacramento Kings. He played one season with the Kings, then went to play for a short time in the CBA. After leaving the CBA, he pursued a career in business, and he now resides in the Chicago area.

Douglas returned to Blue Devil Gym on January 6, 2007, during the first Quincy High School/Quincy Notre Dame High School boys basketball game since 1971. He was one of the honorees to sign the Illinois High School Association's Hall of Fame ball, along with another former Quincy High player, Bruce Brothers.

Douglas returns to Quincy annually to run his free 'Shooting for Christ' Basketball Camp in conjunction with the Salvation Army's Ray & Joan Kroc Community Center.

== Honors ==
=== High school ===
- 1982 – Illinois Mr. Basketball
- 1982 – McDonald's All-American
- 1988 – Inducted into the Illinois Basketball Coaches Association's Hall of Fame as a player.
- 2007 – Named one of the 100 Legends of the IHSA Boys Basketball Tournament.

=== College ===
- 1983 – Honorable Mention All-Big Ten
- 1984 – Team Co-MVP
- 1984 – 1st Team All-Big Ten
- 1984 – NCAA All-Regional Team
- 1984 – Co-Big Ten Player of the Year
- 1984 – 3rd Team All-American
- 1985 – 2nd Team All-Big Ten
- 1985 – Big Ten Defensive Player of the Year
- 1986 – Team Captain
- 1986 – 2nd Team All-Big Ten
- 1986 – Big Ten Defensive Player of the Year
- 2004 – Elected to the "Illini Men's Basketball All-Century Team".
- 2008 – Honored jersey which hangs in the State Farm Center to show regard for being the most decorated basketball players in the University of Illinois' history.

== College statistics ==
=== University of Illinois ===
Season	Games	Points	PPG	Field Goals	Attempts	Avg	Free Throws	Attempts	Avg	Rebounds	Avg	Assists	APG	Steals	SPG
1982–83	32	301	9.4	118	257	.459	64	89	.719	87	2.7	189	5.9	78	2.4
1983–84	31	399	12.9	159	337	.472	81	109	.743	136	4.4	177	5.7	73	2.4
1984–85	35	784	7.9	118	307	.384	42	57	.737	107	3.1	200	5.7	85	2.4
1985–86	32	283	8.8	118	248	.476	47	60	.783	88	2.8	199	6.2	88	2.8
Totals	130	1261	9.7	513	1149	.446	234	315	.743	418	3.2	765*	5.9	324*	2.5

* All-time leader in University of Illinois history

== NBA career statistics ==
Legend
GP	Games played	GS	Games started	MPG	Minutes per game
FG%	Field goal percentage	3P%	3-point field goal percentage	FT%	Free throw percentage
RPG	Rebounds per game	APG	Assists per game	SPG	Steals per game
BPG	Blocks per game	PPG	Points per game	**Bold**	Career high

=== Regular season ===
Year	Team	GP	GS	MPG	FG%	3P%	FT%	RPG	APG	SPG	BPG	PPG
1986–87	Sacramento	8	1	12.3	.292	.000	.000	1.8	2.1	1.1	0.0	1.8
Career		8	1	12.3	.292	.000	.000	1.8	2.1	1.1	0.0	1.8

Awards and achievements
Preceded by Walter Downing	Illinois Mr. Basketball Award Winner; 1982	Succeeded by Marty Simmons
