= Quincy Senior High School =

School in Illinois, US

Location
- 3322 Maine St. Quincy, Illinois; United States; 39.9300°N 91.3621°W

Information
- Type: Public Secondary
- Established: 1864
- School district: Quincy Public School District #172
- Principal: Jody Steinke
- Staff: 97.65 (on an FTE basis)
- Grades: 9–12
- Student to teacher ratio: 19.31
- Campus type: Urban
- Colors: Blue and White
- Athletics conference: Western Big 6 Conference
- Mascot: Blue Devil
- Website: www.qps.org/schools/qhs/

Quincy Senior High School is the regional public high school for Quincy, Illinois. It is the largest high school in Adams County, Illinois, and the only high school in Quincy Public School District 172.

As of 2020, it is the 17th largest high school in Illinois by enrollment outside of Chicago.

== History ==
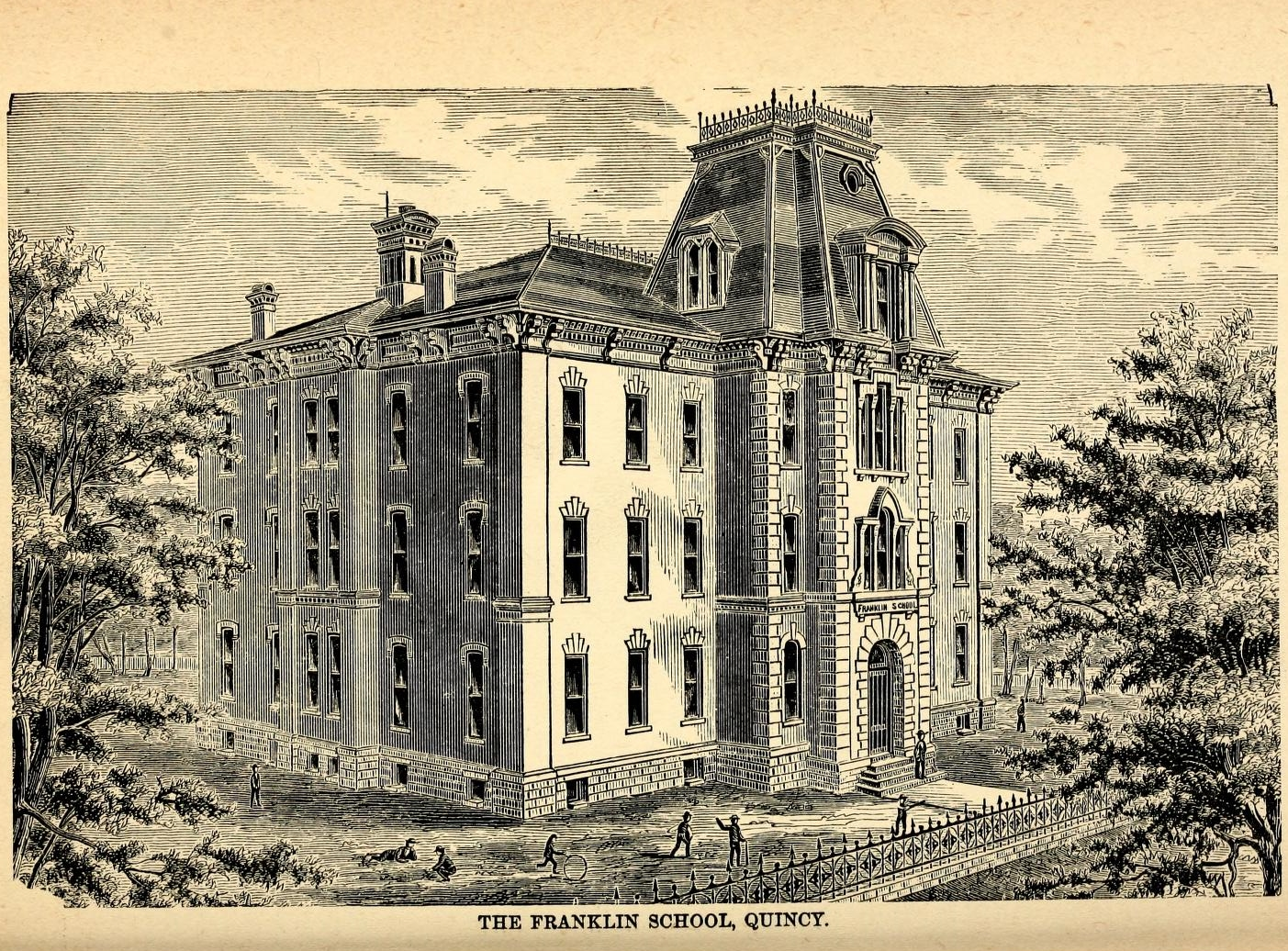
The Franklin School at 5th and York, housed the high school prior to 1892

Early Years (1864 - 1892)

Quincy High School was first established in September 1864 in the old Unitarian Church building at Sixth and Jersey streets, in what was then known as the Center School building. In 1866, the high school was transferred to the Jackson School building at 8th and Vine (now College) Street. From there it was transferred to the top floor of the Franklin School on 5th Street between York and Kentucky, where it remained until plans were made for a dedicated high school. The Franklin School was destroyed by a fire in February 1905.

First High School (1892 - 1933)

The first school dedicated to high school in Quincy, Illinois began construction in 1891 at the corner of 12th and Maine. The building was designed by local architect, Harvey Chatten, designer of the city hall at 3rd and Hampshire, and the Newcomb Mansion. The dedication ceremony was held on June 17, 1892. An addition was completed in 1905–1906. This "Pride of the Gem City" served students as Quincy's population continued to grow and secondary school enrollment increased dramatically. Superintendent Charles M. Gill first proposed building a new state of the art high school in the Quincy Daily Whig on New Year's Eve, 1916, announcing: "It is time to plan for it a new home that will foster a love for the school... for a better preparation to be better neighbors, better citizens, more successful and happier workers, better leaders, and better followers."

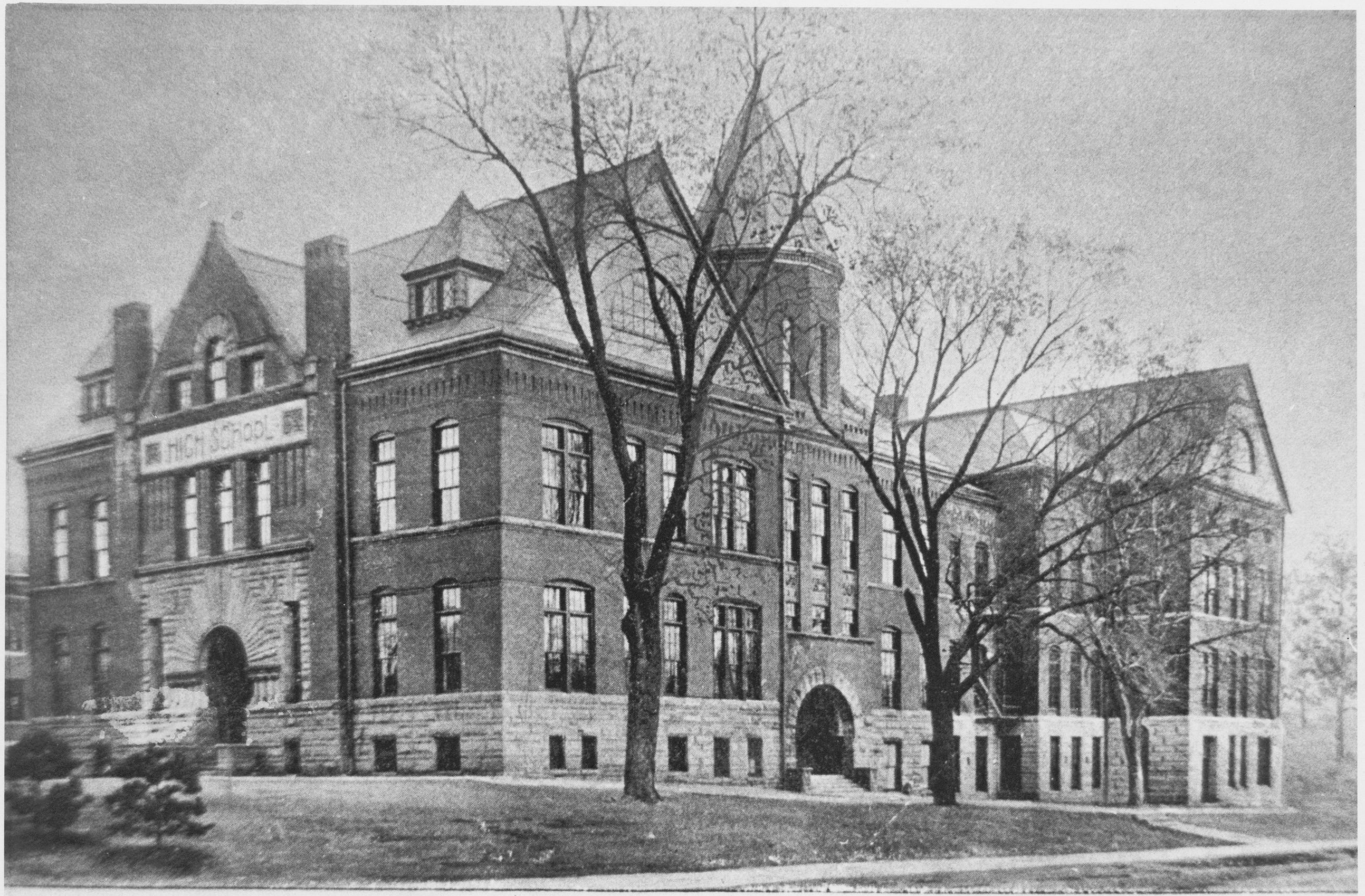
First dedicated Quincy High School at 12th and Maine, designed by architect Harvey Chatten. Opened in August,1892.

Second High School (1933 - 1957)

The site for the new school building at 14th between Maine and Jersey was selected in March 1921. The necessity of a new high school intensified through the 1920s, as the school board, Chamber of Commerce, and Rotary Club worked to secure funding and public favor. Chicago architect John D. Chubb was selected to design the building. By 1929, the price for the new building was estimated at $1,300,000, $800,000 over the $500,000 authorized by the board. Construction was delayed to allow time to collect tax revenue.

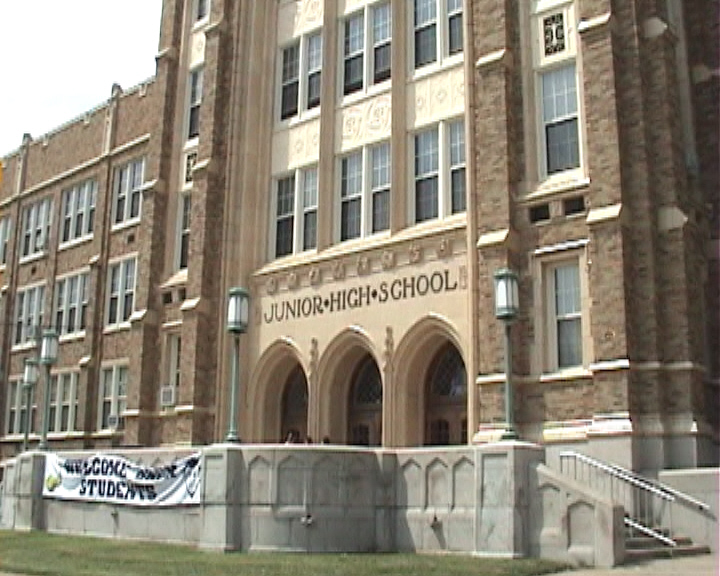
Quincy Junior High School served as the senior high from 1933 until 1957.

The cornerstone for the second high school was laid on November 24, 1931. The new school opened in the fall of 1933, serving grades 10–12. The building sits along Historic Maine Street and remains an icon and historic landmark in the Quincy area today. It is five stories tall, with mosaic details enscripted on the walls. In 1937, eighth and ninth graders were added to the building to relieve crowding at elementary schools. At this time, Webster School and the former high school at 12th and Maine also housed students. As years went on, it was apparent that the 8–12 setup was not working and a change was needed. The school board decided to build a new high school at 30th and Maine (the site of Baldwin Park) and to convert the current building into a 7–9 junior high school.

Third High School (1957 - 1973)

The third Quincy Senior High opened at 30th and Maine in 1957. The first high school building at 12th and Maine was torn down in June 1967. Enrollment continued to climb steadily in the Quincy schools and another building was needed. It was decided to construct an additional high school to the east of the existing high school (the site of the former Gem City Drive In).

Fourth High School (1973–Present)

The fourth and current high school building opened in the fall of 1973. At the time of its opening, it was named Quincy Senior High II and housed students in grades 11 and 12. The existing high school at 30th and Maine was renamed Quincy Senior High I, and converted to grades 9 and 10. The junior high would include just 7th and 8th graders.

Reorganization

In the 1980s, the district experienced several finance problems and an enrollment decline. As a result, the entire district was reorganized. Senior High I closed in 1982. Tenth grade was moved to Senior High II and ninth grade was moved back to Quincy Junior High. Senior High I was converted into Baldwin Intermediate School for grades 4–6.

In the 2016–2017 school year, 9th grade was moved from the Quincy Junior High School building to the current Quincy Senior High School building. For the first time since the 1950s, grades 9-12 were housed in a single building, reflecting the traditional American secondary school model. The Quincy Junior High School building began serving grades 6–8. Five new elementary schools were to be built, including one on the site of Baldwin Intermediate School, to house grades K-5. However, some parts of the old Baldwin School, including Blue Devil Gymnasium, remain.

In 2021, due in part to the COVID-19 pandemic and remote learning, the QHS graduation rate dipped to 77%, 9 points lower than the state average of 86 percent. The graduation rate was significantly lower for students of color — 57% for Latino students, 56% for Black students and approaching 50% for Black males. The discrepancy was described as a community issue affecting the whole district. Administration has taken steps to intervene at the family level by creating roles and services to help students be more successful.

== Athletics ==
Quincy Senior High School participates in the Illinois High School Association and is a member of the Western Big 6 Conference.

=== Basketball ===
History

Quincy, in a 2010 statistical report, was the fourth-winningest high school basketball program in the country, with 1,873 wins since its first game on December 23, 1907.

Quincy holds some Illinois state records, including state tournament appearances (32), regional titles (59), sectional titles (32), state tournament games won (52), tournament games lost (33), tournament games played (89), and state trophies won (14). The Blue Devils have claimed two Illinois state championships in their history. The first was in 1934, capping off a 31–2 season with a 39–27 victory over Thornton High School in the championship. The second championship came in 1981. The Blue Devils were led by future Iowa standout Michael Payne and Illinois legend Bruce Douglas. The Devils compiled an astounding 33–0 record, winning their final four state tournament games by a staggering average of 28.25 points. The Blue Devils were also named the National Champions of high school basketball by USA Today that year. The Blue Devils didn't lose again until the state semifinal game in 1982, compiling a 64-game winning streak, which was a record at the time.

Tradition

On Friday and Saturday nights during basketball season, thousands of Gem City citizens flock to Blue Devil Gymnasium in Baldwin School to watch the games. Quincy's pregame ritual makes it one of the better places to play in the state of Illinois. Before the national anthem, all the lights in the gym are turned off. The visiting team's lineup is announced with a single light illuminating their team. After the fifth starter is announced, that light is extinguished, and the pep band begins to play an ominous medley of the theme from The Phantom of the Opera and Maynard Ferguson's "Conquistador." Then, a student clad in blue shorts, a blue cape, and blue devil horns, emerges from the locker room carrying a flaming trident. He scampers around the perimeter of the court, inciting loud cheers from the crowd. The devil stands at mid-court while the starting lineup is announced as the instrumental "Sirius" by The Alan Parsons Project plays. As he goes back to the locker room, the lights are turned back on, and the players are ready for the opening tip-off.

Quincy Herald-Whig sportswriter Matt Schuckman authored a book entitled Stand Up and Cheer: A Century of Blue Devil Basketball, chronicling the history of the program.

== Fine arts ==
=== Art ===
The many artists of QHS showcase their displays many times during the year. Various works of art can be seen throughout the lobby of A Building, in front of the auditorium.

=== Theatre ===
The QHS Theatre Department presents 2 plays each year in the winter and spring. The Theatre Department combines with the Music Department to present a Fall Musical, Winter Play, Spring Play, and a Spring Variety Show entitled New Faces which has been presented since 1955. Quincy Senior High offers drama classes to all QHS students.

=== Newspaper ===
The school's student newspaper is a monthly publication known as The Q-Review. The Q-Review is completely student-run, with the help of a faculty advisor.

== In popular culture ==
Season 4, Episode 1 of Queer Eye, which aired July 19, 2019, was filmed primarily at Quincy Senior High School. The episode features long-time QHS music director Kathi Dooley receiving a makeover from her former student, Jonathan Van Ness.

== Notable alumni ==
- Bruce Douglas, former professional basketball player in the National Basketball Association (NBA) and Continental Basketball Association (CBA).
- Bernard W. Flinn, president of Rockford Life Insurance Company, benefactor of Quincy High School Flinn Stadium in Quincy, Illinois and Rockford Public Schools District 205 in Rockford, Illinois, and namesake of Bernard W. Flinn Middle School in Rockford, Illinois
- Rick Hummel, author, sports columnist for the St. Louis Post-Dispatch, and National Baseball Hall of Fame inductee
- Brian McGinnis, Green Party candidate for the 2026 United States Senate election in North Carolina.
- Dev Reeves, former professional soccer defender
- Jonathan Van Ness, hairdresser, podcaster, and web & television personality. Best known as the grooming expert on the Netflix reboot of Queer Eye.
