= Andy Kaufmann =

American basketball player

Andy Kaufmann (born c. 1970) is a former basketball 6'5 or 6'6 swingman/small forward who starred at the University of Illinois during the late 1980s and early 1990s.

== High school ==
Kaufmann began his career at Routt Catholic High School in Jacksonville, Illinois. After playing alongside his brother Kevin for one year, he transferred where he starred at Jacksonville High School in Jacksonville, where his 3160 career points ranks him second all-time in the state. He is one of only five players to score over 3,000 points in his career. He scored 50 points in a game three times.

== Illinois career ==
Kaufmann started his Fighting Illini career as a freshman in 1988–89, averaging 4.3 points per game in 12 games for the Illini's Final Four team. As a sophomore in 1989–90, Kaufmann averaged 9.8 points in 29 games.

Kaufmann averaged 21.3 ppg as a junior in 1990–91, leading the team. His 660-point scored that season rank as the second highest single season point total in Fighting Illini history. On December 3, 1990, Kaufmann scored 46 points against Wisconsin-Milwaukee, the second highest single game point total in Fighting Illini men's basketball history.

Kaufmann did not play in the 1991–92 season, due to academic suspension. In the 1992–93 season, Kaufmann averaged 17.3 points as a senior.

Kaufmann is perhaps best remembered for his 3-point buzzer beater on February 4, 1993, gave the Illini a one-point victory over the ninth-ranked Iowa Hawkeyes. IlliniHQ.com rates this the 4th greatest moment in Illini basketball history.

As of 2013, Kaufmann is the Fighting Illini's 10th all-time leading scorer with 1,533 points, a total which ranked fourth on the all-time list at the completion of his playing eligibility. As of 1999, he was the 8th all-time Illini player for made 3-point field goals with 105 in (276 attempts).

== Pro basketball ==
Kaufmann was drafted in the 7th (and final) round, 107 overall, of the 1993 CBA amateur draft by Wichita Falls Texans. He was also drafted in the Open Phase 5th round (38th overall) of the 1993 USBL draft, by Daytona Beach Hooters. Although he received offers to play overseas, Kaufmann was burnt out of basketball after his senior year and decided to give it up. He made his first trip back to the University of Illinois during the 25th anniversary of the Flying Illini celebration. He currently works at the Blind and Deaf School in Jacksonville.
