= Dee Brown (basketball, born 1984) =

American basketball player (born 1984)

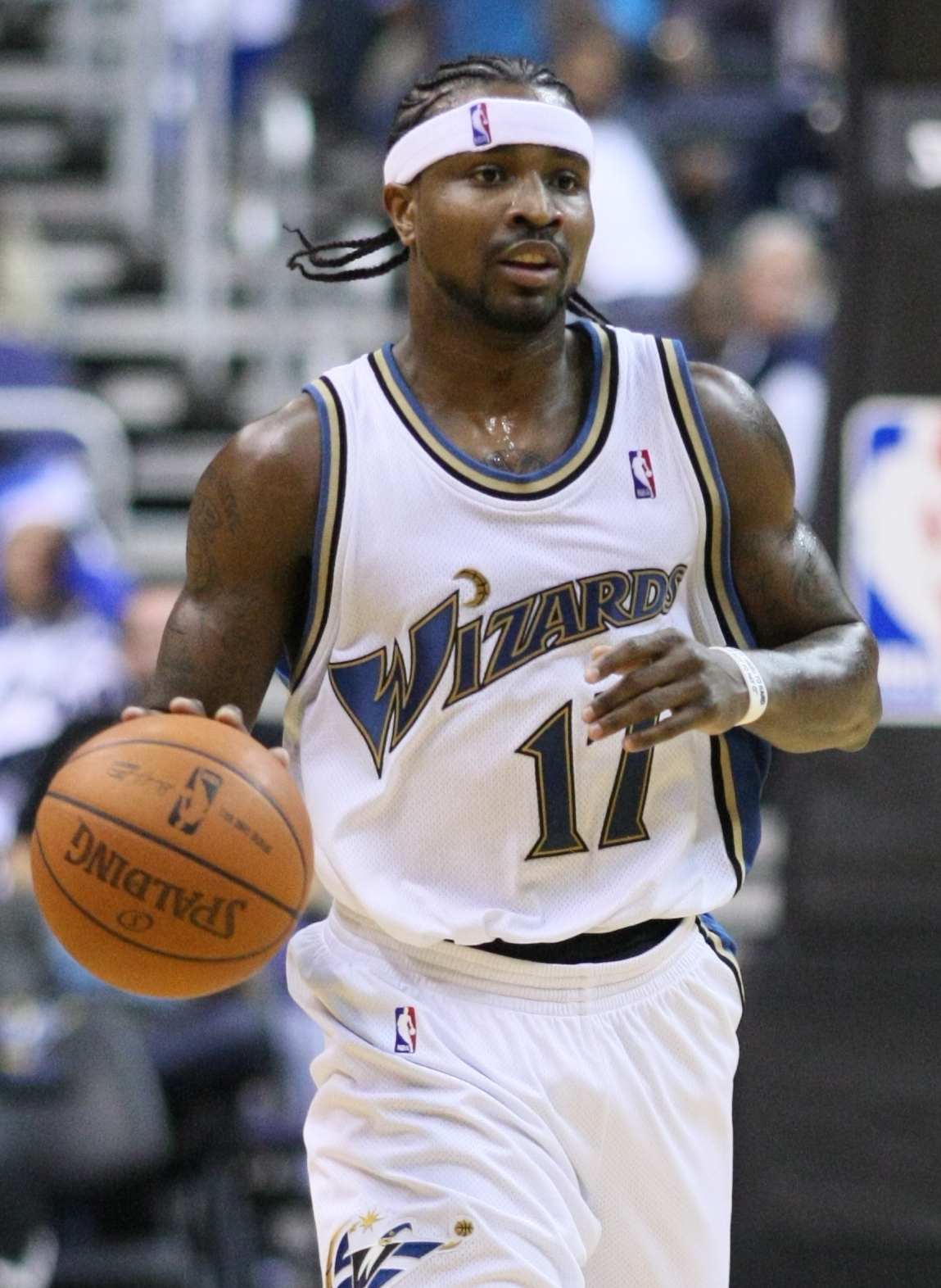
- Brown with the Washington Wizards in 2008

Roosevelt Lakers
- Title: Head coach
- League: Great Lakes Intercollegiate Athletic Conference

Personal information
- Born: August 17, 1984 (age 42) Jackson, Mississippi, U.S.
- Listed height: 6 ft 1 in (1.85 m)
- Listed weight: 185 lb (84 kg)

Career information
- High school: Proviso East (Maywood, Illinois)
- College: Illinois (2002–2006)
- NBA draft: 2006: 2nd round, 46th overall pick
- Drafted by: Utah Jazz
- Playing career: 2006–2015
- Position: Point guard
- Number: 11, 17, 23
- Coaching career: 2016–present

Career history

Playing
- 2006–2007: Utah Jazz
- 2007–2008: Galatasaray Café Crown
- 2008: Washington Wizards
- 2008–2009: Phoenix Suns
- 2009: Maccabi Tel Aviv
- 2009–2010: Air Avellino
- 2010–2011: Qingdao DoubleStar
- 2011: Piratas de Quebradillas
- 2011–2012: Teramo Basket
- 2012–2013: Türk Telekom
- 2013–2014: VEF Rīga
- 2014–2015: CSU Asesoft Ploiești
- 2015: PBC Lukoil Academic

Coaching
- 2016–2017: Shandong Golden Stars (U18 technical director)
- 2017–2022: UIC (assistant)
- 2022–present: Roosevelt

Career highlights
- Bulgarian League champion (2015); Sporting News College Player of the Year (2005); Consensus first-team All-American (2005); Consensus second-team All-American (2006); Bob Cousy Award (2006); Frances Pomeroy Naismith Award (2006); First-team All-Big Ten (2005, 2006); Big Ten Player of the Year (2005); Big Ten Defensive Player of the Year (2005); Illinois Mr. Basketball (2002); McDonald's All-American (2002)
- Stats at NBA.com
- Stats at Basketball Reference

Daniel "Dee" Brown (born August 17, 1984) is an American former professional basketball player and current college coach. Brown played at the University of Illinois from 2002 to 2006, receiving numerous awards and accolades, including the 2005 Sporting News National Player of the Year. Brown was selected in the second round of the 2006 NBA draft by the Utah Jazz. Brown played for several international basketball teams from 2007 to 2015.

== High school ==
Brown attended Proviso East High School in Maywood, Illinois. He earned Mr. Basketball honors in the state of Illinois following his senior season, and was the ninth Mr. Basketball to attend Illinois since the award began in 1981. Brown was named Illinois' Gatorade Player of the Year in 2002, McDonald's All-American, Champaign-Urbana News-Gazette Illinois Player of the Year in 2002, First-Team All-State pick by the IBCA, Chicago Tribune, Chicago Sun-Times, and the Champaign-Urbana News-Gazette. Brown finished his high school career as Proviso East's all-time leader in scoring, assists and steals, averaging 25.6 points, 5.5 assists and 2.9 steals per game as a senior. He shot 44 percent from the three-point arc as a senior and once made 12 three-pointers on his way to 42 points against Addison Trail High School as a senior. Brown helped the Pirates to the Sweet Sixteen of the Illinois state tournament as a senior and averaged 19 points, eight assists, five rebounds and five steals per game as a junior while earning First-Team All-State honors from the Chicago Tribune, Chicago Sun-Times and Champaign-Urbana News-Gazette. His tenacity in transition offense earned him the moniker "The One-Man Fast Break" from the Chicago-based media, a nickname that stayed with him throughout college.

Brown led Proviso East to a 25–4 record and the West Suburban Gold Conference championship was ranked by RivalsHoops.com as the No. 2 point guard and No. 11 player overall in the nation and ranked the No. 3 point guard and No. 18 player overall by Blue Chip Hoops and Ranked by All-Star Report as the nation's No. 19 player. Brown also played football at Proviso East, starting at quarterback and lettering in 2000 and 2001. Brown passed and ran for more than 1800 yards and 16 touchdowns in seven games as a quarterback during his senior season and earned recruiting overtures from Florida State University and the University of Nebraska–Lincoln for football. Brown played in the Jordan Brand Capital Classic, McDonald's All-American, and City-Suburban All-Star games. In addition to his athletic accomplishments, Brown also excelled in the classroom. He graduated from Proviso East in 2002, ranked sixteenth in a class of 382 students.

College recruiting
Name	Hometown	School	Height	Weight	Commit date
Dee Brown; PG	Maywood, IL	Proviso East (Illinois)	6 ft 0 in (1.83 m)	185 lb (84 kg)	Jun 24, 2001
Dee Brown; PG	Recruit ratings: Scout: Rivals:				
Overall recruit ranking: Scout: 5 (PG) Rivals: 2 (PG)
Note: In many cases, Scout, Rivals, 247Sports, On3, and ESPN may conflict in their listings of height and weight.; In these cases, the average was taken. ESPN grades are on a 100-point scale.; Sources: "2002 Illinois Basketball Commitment List". Rivals.; "2002 Illinois Basketball Commitment List". Scout.; "Scout.com Team Recruiting Rankings". Scout.; "2002 Team Ranking". Rivals.

== College ==
=== Freshman year ===
Brown was named a starting guard for 31 of 32 games in his freshman season at Illinois the one game he did not start walk on player Nolan Roberts took his place on senior night. He led the Big Ten Conference in assists per game (5.0) and averaged 1.8 steals; a contribution that helped the Illini finish second in the Big Ten regular season standings and win the 2003 Big Ten Conference men's basketball tournament.

=== Sophomore year ===
In his second season, Brown shared duties at point guard and shooting guard with Deron Williams. He started every game of the season, averaging 13.3 points per game and ranking second on the team in assists with 4.5 per game (behind Deron Williams). Williams and Brown, combined with talents of junior shooting guard Luther Head and the frontcourt tandem of Roger Powell and James Augustine, helped the Illini to a 13–3 Big Ten Conference regular season record, enough to win the school's first outright Big Ten Conference Championship since 1952.

In the NCAA Tournament, Brown helped the 5th-seeded Illini to an opening-round 72–53 victory over 12th-seeded Murray State. In their second-round game against the 4th-seeded Cincinnati Bearcats, Brown scored 14 points and accounted for 8 of the team's 26 assists in a 92–68 victory, the Illini's first ever NCAA Tournament victory over a higher-seeded team. Illinois finally lost to top-ranked Duke, 72–62, in the regional semifinals.

=== Junior year ===
In the 2004–2005 collegiate basketball season, Brown was one of a celebrated trio of guards (along with Deron Williams and Luther Head) that led the Fighting Illini to a 37–2 record and a second-place finish in the 2005 NCAA Division I men's basketball tournament.

Brown was named a 2005 Consensus First-Team All-American, he was a finalist for the John R. Wooden Award finishing third, and was named the National Player of the Year by The Sporting News.

After the 2004–2005 season, Brown considered declaring his eligibility for the NBA draft. However, Brown broke his foot during the NBA pre-draft camp for draft-eligible players, and opted to not enter the draft and return to Illinois for his senior year.

In March of this season, Brown was featured on the cover of Sports Illustrated. The title proclaimed "It's March!" and included a picture of Brown popping the front of his jersey towards the crowd.

=== Senior year ===
With Williams and Head in the NBA, Brown and fellow senior James Augustine led the Illini to a 26–7 record. Brown had played shooting guard for his first three years at Illinois. But since Deron Williams, who played point guard in his years at Illinois, had left for the NBA, Brown returned to his primary position of point guard for his senior season. His last game was the 67–64 loss to Washington in the second round of the 2006 NCAA Tournament. After the season, Brown was named Second-Team All-American by the Associated Press. He received the sixth-most votes, making him the leading vote getter on the second team. Also, he was named the winner of the Bob Cousy Award for 2006, given to the nation's top collegiate male point guard.

Memorable games included a career-high 34 points at home against Michigan State on January 5, 2006, and 14 points in a win on the road against UNC in the ACC/Big Ten Challenge (avenging the loss to UNC in the previous season's NCAA championship game in St. Louis). Brown led in the Fighting Illini in points (14.2), assists (5.8), steals (1.6) and minutes (35.8).

When he retired his famous orange headband, he ended perhaps the finest four years in the school's history. Brown is the winningest player in Illinois history (tied with James Augustine) with 114 victories, leads in all-time minutes (4,698) and started the most games (136) of any player in school history. Brown played in 137 games during his career, the second most in school history (tied with James Augustine), he was third on the Illini all-time scoring chart with 1,812 career points and second in school history in career 3-pointers (299), career assists (674) and career steals (231). His career assists total ranks fifth in Big Ten history, while his career 3-pointers and career steals totals rank sixth in Big Ten history. Brown is also Illinois' record holder in the NCAA Tournament for career points (179) and career field goals (64).

== Pro career ==
=== NBA ===
During the 2006 NBA draft, Brown was selected 46th overall by the Utah Jazz but was not offered a guaranteed contract. Brown attended the team's training camp in the fall, where he and various undrafted players competed for a roster spot. On August 29, 2006, Dee Brown signed with the Jazz and was reunited with former college teammates Deron Williams and Roger Powell, who also signed with the team.

On November 14, 2006, Brown scored his first points in the NBA with a pair of free throws against the Los Angeles Clippers. Through the first month of the NBA season, Brown played off the bench in eight of the Jazz's seventeen games. Brown played in 49 games during his rookie season, averaging just under two points per game.

After spending the 2007–08 season with Galatasaray Café Crown in Turkey, he was signed by the Washington Wizards to an offer sheet for a two-year, partially guaranteed deal on July 9, 2008. Since Brown was still a restricted free agent at the time, the Jazz were given one week to match the offer, but declined to do so since they were already stocked at point guard. Brown officially signed with the Wizards as a free agent on July 30.

Due to an injury to guard Gilbert Arenas, Brown broke into the Wizards rotation, eventually becoming the starting point guard. Brown averaged 2.4 points and 1.9 assists in 17 games with the Wizards.

Brown was released by the Wizards on December 10, 2008, to make room for Mike James and Javaris Crittenton, two guards acquired by the Wizards via trade. On December 23 Brown was signed by the Phoenix Suns, who were looking for a backup point guard. After playing two games in which he averaged 2.5 points and 1.5 assists per game, Brown was released. In 2010 the Dallas Mavericks invited Brown to their training camp, but he was waived on October 21.

=== Overseas ===
On September 22, 2007, Brown decided that he would play the 2007–08 season for Galatasaray Café Crown of the Turkish Basketball League rather than try to make the Jazz's roster in training camp.

On January 23, 2009, Brown signed a contract with Israeli power house Maccabi Tel Aviv for the remainder of the 2008–09 season. He was signed ahead of the top 16 stage of the Euroleague to team-up with former NBA player Carlos Arroyo in Maccabi's back court.

Brown signed with Air Avellino of the Italian Basketball Federation on August 11, 2009.

On November 16, 2010, Brown signed with the Qingdao DoubleStar Eagles of the Chinese Basketball Association.

In April 2011, he signed a contract with Piratas de Quebradillas in Puerto Rico.

On July 21, 2011, he signed with the Italian team Teramo Basket.

In the summer of 2012, he signed a contract with Türk Telekom.

On July 31, 2013, Brown signed with Latvian champions VEF Rīga of the VTB United League and ULEB Eurocup.

On August 8, 2014, he signed a one-year deal with the Romanian team CSU Asesoft Ploiești. On January 21, 2015, he left Asesoft, and signed with PBC Lukoil Academic in Bulgaria.

Brown announced his retirement from playing professional basketball in September 2015.

== Post-playing career ==
On September 8, 2015, Brown was hired by the University of Illinois at Urbana-Champaign as a special assistant to Athletic Director Mike Thomas, after his contractual obligation to Lukoli Academic ended. In April 2016, Brown was made the Director of Player Development and Alumni Relations for the school's men's basketball program.

In October 2016, Brown resigned from his position at the University of Illinois, citing personal reasons. Brown commented on his departure through Twitter, saying, "I've been dealing with some personal issues that have weighed heavily on me. ... After much thought, I've made the tough decision to leave my position. I will always have love for my school and basketball program."

On August 29, 2017, Brown was hired as an assistant coach for the University of Illinois-Chicago men's basketball team.

Brown was named head coach of the Roosevelt University men's basketball team on June 27, 2022.

== Career statistics ==
Legend
GP	Games played	GS	Games started	MPG	Minutes per game
FG%	Field goal percentage	3P%	3-point field goal percentage	FT%	Free throw percentage
RPG	Rebounds per game	APG	Assists per game	SPG	Steals per game
BPG	Blocks per game	PPG	Points per game	**Bold**	Career high

=== NBA ===
==== Regular season ====
Year	Team	GP	GS	MPG	FG%	3P%	FT%	RPG	APG	SPG	BPG	PPG
2006–07	Utah	**49**	0	9.2	.327	.214	.649	.8	1.7	.4	**.1**	1.9
2008–09	Washington	17	**11**	13.7	**.386**	.300	.333	**1.6**	**1.9**	**.6**	.0	2.4
2008–09	Phoenix	2	0	**14.0**	.200	.250	**1.000**	.5	1.5	.0	.0	**2.5**
Career		68	11	10.5	.340	.250	.643	1.0	1.8	.5	.1	2.1

==== Playoffs ====
Year	Team	GP	GS	MPG	FG%	3P%	FT%	RPG	APG	SPG	BPG	PPG
2007	Utah	8	0	6.5	.353	.000	.250	.4	1.1	.0	.0	1.6

=== International ===
Year	Team	GP	GS	MPG	FG%	3P%	FT%	RPG	APG	SPG	BPG	PPG
2007–08	Galatasaray Cafe Crown	TBL	24	31.3	.458	.355	.519	2.7	4.8	1.4	.0	12.7
2008–09	Maccabi Tel Aviv B.C.	Ligat HaAl	17	12.9	.579	.368	.857	1.2	2.1	.5	.1	4.5
2009–10	Air Avellino	Lega A	30	29.9	.500	.319	.795	2.6	5.2	1.7	.0	14.8
2010–11	Qingdao DoubleStar	China CBA	31	31.7	.538	.322	.794	3.8	4.8	2.0	.2	22.2
2011	Piratas de Quebradillas	BSN	15	?	.550	.480	.790	3.4	5.9	?	?	16.5
2011–12	Teramo Basket	Lega A	32	33.1	.461	.307	.733	3.3	3.3	1.2	.1	11.8
2012–13	Türk Telekom B.K.	TBL	30	34.6	.448	.354	.736	2.4	4.9	1.2	.0	14.0
2013–14	BK VEF Rīga	Latvia LBL	17	30.0	.514	.209	.667	3.3	4.6	1.7	.1	8.6
2013–14	BK VEF Rīga	VTB United League	18	32.4	.440	.303	.795	2.7	6.3	1.5	.0	10.9
2014–15	CSU Asesoft Ploiești	Liga Națională	10	37.1	.586	.283	.800	3.4	9.1	1.8	.0	14.7
2014–15	PBC Lukoil Academic	Bulgaria NBL	22	30.3	.613	.385	.865	3.1	7.2	1.5	.0	14.3

=== College ===
*	Led NCAA Division I

Year	Team	GP	GS	MPG	FG%	3P%	FT%	RPG	APG	SPG	BPG	PPG
2002–03	Illinois	32	31	34.1	.434	.329	.681	**3.7**	5.0	**1.8**	–	12.0
2003–04	Illinois	33	33	34.9	.411	.346	.671	**3.7**	4.5	1.5	**.1**	13.3
2004–05	Illinois	**39***	**39**	32.6	**.499**	**.434**	**.772**	2.7	4.5	**1.8**	**.1**	13.3
2005–06	Illinois	33	33	**35.8**	.359	.321	.757	3.1	**5.8**	1.6	.0	**14.2**
Career		137	136	34.3	.422	.360	.725	3.3	4.9	1.7	.1	13.2

== Head coaching record ==
Season	Team	Overall	Conference	Standing	Postseason
2022-23	Roosevelt	19-10	16-4		
2023-24	Roosevelt	25-5	18-2		
2024-25	Roosevelt	9-20	6-14	T-9th	
2025-26	Roosevelt	4-23	3-17	11	

Awards and achievements
Preceded by Eddy Curry	Illinois Mr. Basketball Award Winner; 2002	Succeeded by Shannon Brown
