= Kiwane Garris =

American basketball player (born 1974)

Personal information
- Born: September 24, 1974 (age 52) Chicago, Illinois, U.S.
- Listed height: 6 ft 2 in (1.88 m)
- Listed weight: 183 lb (83 kg)

Career information
- High school: Westinghouse (Chicago, Illinois)
- College: Illinois (1993–1997)
- NBA draft: 1997: undrafted
- Playing career: 1997–2010
- Position: Point guard
- Number: 1

Career history
- 1997: Grand Rapids Hoops
- 1997–1998: Denver Nuggets
- 1998–1999: Alba Berlin
- 1999: TuS Lichterfelde
- 1999: Grand Rapids Hoops
- 1999–2000: Orlando Magic
- 2000: Grand Rapids Hoops
- 2000: Trotamundos de Carabobo
- 2000: Beşiktaş
- 2000–2001: Gary Steelheads
- 2001: New Mexico Slam
- 2001: Évreux
- 2001–2002: Virtus Ragusa
- 2002: Spójnia Stargard Szczeciński
- 2002–2003: Robur Osimo
- 2003–2005: Reggiana
- 2005–2006: Fortitudo Bologna
- 2006–2007: Olimpia Milano
- 2007–2009: Sutor Montegranaro
- 2009–2010: Reyer Venezia

Career highlights
- 2× First-team All-Big Ten (1996, 1997); Third-team Parade All-American (1993)
- Stats at NBA.com
- Stats at Basketball Reference
Medals
Representing United States
World Championships
Bronze medal – third place	1998 Greece	National team

Kiwane Lemorris Garris (born September 24, 1974) is an American former professional basketball player. He was listed as a 6-foot-2-inch (1.88 m), 183 pounds (83 kg) point guard.

Garris played college basketball for the Illinois Fighting Illini as a point guard. As a freshman in the 1993–94 season, Garris finished second on the team in scoring, behind Deon Thomas. In the next three seasons, Garris led the team in scoring and free-throw percentage. Garris also led the team in assists in the 1994–95 and 1996–97 seasons. Garris finished his career at Illinois as the second all-time leading scorer, behind former teammate Deon Thomas. Garris finished with 1948 career points, with a career scoring average of 16.8 points per game.

During the NBA lockout he played for the US national team in the 1998 FIBA World Championship, winning the bronze medal.

== Career ==
Although Garris was projected to be a late first round or early second round pick in the NBA Draft, he went undrafted, but signed as a free-agent with the Denver Nuggets. He had been signed for a brief period by Los Angeles Clippers during their 1997 preseason but was waived. For the 1997-1998's 28 games he did 8MPG, 2.4 PPG. Playing for the Orlando Magic during 1999–2000, 3 games, 7.7 MPG, 1.3 PPG. In 2002, he was signed by the Sacramento Kings (2002 preseason), but was again waived before the regular season. He has also played with the Grand Rapids Hoops of the CBA and for Alba Berlin in Germany.

=== Italian League ===
For nine years he played overseas for the Italian teams Banca Popolare Ragusa (Serie A2, 2001–2002), Porte Garofoli Osimo (Serie A2, 2002–2003), Bipop-Carire Reggio Emilia (Serie A2, 2003–2004, Serie A, 2004–2005), Climamio Bologna (2005–2006) (reached the Italian championship final and won Italian Supercup) and Armani Jeans Milano (2006–2007). After playing overseas in Italy for nine years from 2001 to 2010, Garris returned home.

=== Coaching career ===
He is a former assistant coach at Prairie State College and at Mountain View High School in Lawrenceville, GA. He hopes to become one of the assistant coaches at the University of Illinois. Currently he is the coach of the Fulton Science Academy Private School varsity basketball team.

== Personal life ==
Garris has son Kai from a previous relationship.

In July 2006 he became engaged to R&B and soul singer-songwriter Syleena Johnson, and the pair married on July 1, 2007. Johnson is a fellow Chicagoan. On August 1, 2007 after forty-four hours of labor, their son Kiwane Garris Jr was born. On Sunday, February 6, 2011, she gave birth to their second son, Kingston Garris He weighed 8 lb 5oz.

He said Italy is "his home away from home".
