= 2014–15 Big Ten Conference men's basketball season =

- League: NCAA Division I
- Sport: Basketball
- Teams: 14
- TV partner(s): Big Ten Network, ESPN, CBS

2014–15 NCAA Division I men's basketball season
- Regular season champions: Wisconsin
- Runners-up: Maryland
- Season MVP: Frank Kaminsky
- Top scorer: D. J. Newbill

Tournament
- Venue: United Center, Chicago, Illinois
- Champions: Wisconsin
- Runners-up: Michigan State
- Finals MVP: Frank Kaminsky, Wisconsin

Basketball seasons
- 2013–14 2015–16

2014–15 Big Ten Conference men's basketball standings
	Conf.				Overall
Team	W		L	PCT	W		L	PCT
No. 3 Wisconsin †	16	–	2	.889	36	–	4	.900
No. 12 Maryland	14	–	4	.778	28	–	7	.800
No. 23 Michigan State	12	–	6	.667	27	–	12	.692
Iowa	12	–	6	.667	22	–	12	.647
Purdue	12	–	6	.667	21	–	13	.618
Ohio State	11	–	7	.611	24	–	11	.686
Indiana	9	–	9	.500	20	–	14	.588
Illinois	9	–	9	.500	19	–	14	.576
Michigan	8	–	10	.444	16	–	16	.500
Minnesota	6	–	12	.333	18	–	15	.545
Northwestern	6	–	12	.333	15	–	17	.469
Nebraska	5	–	13	.278	13	–	18	.419
Penn State	4	–	14	.222	18	–	16	.529
Rutgers	2	–	16	.111	10	–	22	.313
† 2015 Big Ten tournament winner Rankings from AP poll

The 2014–15 Big Ten men's basketball season began with practices in October 2014, followed by the start of the 2014–15 NCAA Division I men's basketball season in November. It marked the first season for Rutgers and Maryland in the Big Ten Conference. Wisconsin won the regular season title and the 2015 Big Ten Conference men's basketball tournament.

Following the season, eight teams participated in post-season tournaments. Seven teams were invited to participate in the 2015 NCAA Men's Division I Basketball Tournament, and one team was selected for the 2015 National Invitation Tournament. The conference achieved a 12–7 record in the NCAA tournament and a 12–8 overall postseason record. The postseason was highlighted by Wisconsin's NCAA tournament championship game appearance and Michigan State's final four appearance.

Frank Kaminsky earned several national player of the year awards and was the Big Ten Conference Men's Basketball Player of the Year. He and D'Angelo Russell received 2014 All-American first team recognition and Melo Trimble earned second team recognition. Russell and Trimble were both 2015 USBWA Freshman All-America Team selections. Kaminsky and Russell were the inaugural Kareem Abdul-Jabbar Award and Jerry West Award winners, respectively. Shavon Shields and Mike Gesell were Academic All-America selections.

Following the season, the conference had 5 selections in the 2015 NBA draft, including 3 in the first round: Russell (2nd), Kaminsky (9th), Sam Dekker (18th), Aaron White (49th), and Branden Dawson (56th). International player, Caleb Swanigan won a gold medal with Team USA at the 2015 FIBA Under-19 World Championship, while Trimble and Denzel Valentine won bronze medals at the 2015 Pan American Games.

== Preseason ==
According to the Big Ten media, Frank Kaminsky was the preseason conference player of the year and he was joined on the All-Big Ten preseason team by Yogi Ferrell, Caris LeVert, Terran Petteway, and Sam Dekker. The Big Ten Network poll came to the same results.

When CBSSports.com named its Preseason All-American team, it included LeVert, Petteway, Kaminsky and Dekker to its second team. NBCSports.com selected LeVert and Dekker to its Preseason All-American first team, Kaminsky to its second team and named Petteway as an honorable mention. Kaminsky was also a Preseason All-American first team selection by the Associated Press. Sporting News included Branden Dawson (1st team), Petteway and Dekker (2nd team), and Kaminsky (3rd team). USA Today selected Dekker to its first team, Dawson to its second team and Kaminsky, LeVert and Petteway to its third team. SB Nation included Kaminsky on its first team, Dekker and LeVert on its second team and Petteway on its third team. Sports Illustrated included Kaminsky on its first team and selected Dekker and LeVert to its second team. Bleacher Report selected Kaminsky and Petteway to its first team and LeVert and Dekker to its second team. Athlon Sports selected Dekker to its first team, LeVert and Kaminsky to its second team and Petteway to its third team. Blue Ribbon College Basketball Yearbook selected Kaminsky as its preseason National Player of the Year and to its first team, while selecting Dekker and LeVert to its second team.

	CBS	AP	TSN	USA Today	SB Nation	Blue Ribbon	Athlon Sports	Bleacher Report	NBC	BigTen.org	BTN	Sports Illustrated
Frank Kaminsky	2nd	1st	3rd	3rd	1st	1st	2nd	1st	2nd	✓	✓	1st
Yogi Ferrell										✓	✓	
Caris LeVert	2nd			3rd	2nd	2nd	2nd	2nd	1st	✓	✓	2nd
Terran Petteway	2nd		2nd	3rd	3rd		3rd	1st		✓	✓	
Sam Dekker	2nd		2nd	1st	2nd	2nd	1st	2nd	1st	✓	✓	2nd
Branden Dawson			1st	2nd								

=== Preseason watchlists ===
Below is a table of notable preseason watch lists.

	Wooden	Naismith	Robertson	Cousy	Olson	Tisdale
James Blackmon, Jr. IND						✓
Branden Dawson MSU	✓	✓	✓		✓	
Sam Dekker WIS	✓	✓	✓		✓	
Yogi Ferrell IND	✓	✓		✓		
Robert Johnson IND						✓
Frank Kaminsky WIS	✓	✓	✓		✓	
Caris LeVert MICH	✓	✓	✓		✓	
Terran Petteway NEB	✓	✓	✓		✓	
D'Angelo Russell OSU		✓				✓
Melo Trimble MD				✓		
Derrick Walton MICH				✓		
Dez Wells MD	✓					

Derrick Walton, Ferrell and Melo Trimble were among the 36 athletes on the Bob Cousy Award Preseason Watch List. LeVert, Dawson, Petteway, Dekker and Kaminsky were named to the Lute Olson Award Preseason Watch List. The Oscar Robertson Trophy Watch List included LeVert, Dawson, Petteway, Dekker and Kaminsky. James Blackmon, Jr., Robert Johnson, and D'Angelo Russell made the Wayman Tisdale Award Watch List.

Dawson, Dekker, Ferrell, Kaminsky, LeVert, Petteway and Dez Wells all made the Wooden Award Preseason Top 50 list. When the Naismith Award Top 50 list came out in early December, it included Dawson, Dekker, Ferrell, Kaminsky, LeVert, Petteway and Russell.

=== Preseason polls ===
Wisconsin was selected as the unanimous preseason favorite to win the conference championship by the members of the Big Ten Media. Michigan State and Ohio State were predicted to finish second and third in the same poll. The Big Ten Network poll had Wisconsin followed by Ohio State and Michigan State.

Several Preseason polls included Big Ten Teams.

	AP	Coaches	CBS	NBC	Sporting News	Sports Illustrated	Blue Ribbon Yearbook	Bleacher Report	Athlon Sports
Illinois									
Indiana									
Iowa		25				20		25	
Maryland									
Michigan	24	23				25	23	20	23
Michigan State	18	18			18	21	20		14
Minnesota									
Nebraska	21	21			22		24	17	11
Northwestern									
Ohio State	20	20			21	13	15		20
Penn State									
Purdue									
Rutgers									
Wisconsin	3	4			3	3	3	2	2

== Conference schedules ==
Before the season, it was announced that all 126 conference games would be broadcast nationally by CBS Sports, ESPN Inc. family of networks including ESPN, ESPN2 and ESPNU, and the Big Ten Network. ESPN scheduled a game for every Tuesday and Thursday night of the conference season and CBS scheduled games for Saturday or Sunday afternoons starting January 17, 2015. CBS will carry the semifinals and finals of the 2015 Big Ten Conference men's basketball tournament, marking the 18th consecutive year that they have covered the Big Ten Conference men's basketball tournament. Following the season, the Big Ten was announced as the national attendance leader for the 39th consecutive season with an average attendance of 12,781 for regular season home games and all seven sessions of the Big Ten Men's Basketball Tournament. With the addition of Maryland and Rutgers, the Big Ten surpassed 3 million in total attendance for the first time with totals of 3,195,137, including conference tournament games, and 3,076,641, excluding them. A record for intraconference games was also achieved with 1,677,589 total patrons. Eleven of the top thirty-two schools were in the Big Ten: Wisconsin (5th, 17,279), Indiana (8th, 16,288), Nebraska (10th, 15,569), Michigan State (14th, 14,797), Illinois (15th, 14,652), Ohio State (16th, 14,648), Iowa (20th, 14,101), Maryland (25th, 12,695), Michigan (28th, 12,316), Minnesota (29th, 12,188) and Purdue (32nd, 11,523). The 3,195,137 for the 14-team Big Ten was the second highest total in NCAA history only behind the 16-team Big East Conference in the 2006–07 NCAA Division I men's basketball season which recorded 3,259,992 patrons. The Big Ten its rival conferences by over 1000 attendees: ACC (11,368), SEC (10,819), Big 12 (10,181) and Big East (9,853).

=== 2014 ACC–Big Ten Challenge (Big Ten 8–6) ===
Date	Time	ACC team	B1G team	Score	Location	Television	Attendance	Challenge leader
Dec 1	7:00 pm	Florida State	**Nebraska**	70–65	Donald L. Tucker Center • Tallahassee, Florida	ESPN2	6,406	B1G (1–0)
Dec 1	7:00 pm	Clemson	**Rutgers**	69–64	Littlejohn Coliseum • Clemson, South Carolina	ESPNU	6,285	B1G (2–0)
Dec 2	7:00 pm	Pittsburgh	**Indiana**	81–69	Assembly Hall • Bloomington, Indiana	ESPN2	17,472	B1G (3–0)
Dec 2	7:00 pm	Wake Forest	**Minnesota**	84–69	LJVM Coliseum • Winston-Salem, North Carolina	ESPNU	8,112	B1G (4–0)
Dec 2	7:30 pm	Syracuse	No. 17 **Michigan**	68–65	Crisler Center • Ann Arbor, Michigan	ESPN	12,707	B1G (5–0)
Dec 2	9:00 pm	No. 15 **Miami**	No. 24 Illinois	70–61	BankUnited Center • Coral Gables, Florida	ESPN2	6,086	B1G (5–1)
Dec 2	9:00 pm	NC State	**Purdue**	66–61	Mackey Arena • West Lafayette, Indiana	ESPNU	12,023	B1G (6–1)
Dec 2	9:30 pm	No. 5 **Louisville**	No. 14 Ohio State	64–55	KFC Yum! Center • Louisville, Kentucky	ESPN	22,784	B1G (6–2)
Dec 3	7:15 pm	**Notre Dame**	No. 19 Michigan State	79–78^{OT}	Edmund P. Joyce Center • South Bend, Indiana	ESPN2	9,149	B1G (6–3)
Dec 3	7:15 pm	Virginia Tech	**Penn State**	61–58	Bryce Jordan Center • University Park, Pennsylvania	ESPNU	7,326	B1G (7–3)
Dec 3	7:30 pm	No. 12 North Carolina	**Iowa**	60–55	Dean Smith Center • Chapel Hill, North Carolina	ESPN	18,040	B1G (8–3)
Dec 3	9:15 pm	No. 7 **Virginia**	No. 21 Maryland	76–65	Xfinity Center • College Park, Maryland	ESPN2	15,371	B1G (8–4)
Dec 3	9:15 pm	**Georgia Tech**	Northwestern	66–58	Welsh-Ryan Arena • Evanston, Illinois	ESPNU	6,133	B1G (8–5)
Dec 3	9:30 pm	No. 4 **Duke**	No. 2 Wisconsin	80–70	Kohl Center • Madison, Wisconsin	ESPN	17,279	B1G (8–6)
**Winners are in bold** Game times in EST. Rankings from AP Poll (Dec 1). Challenge expanded to 14 games with the addition of Maryland and Rutgers to the B1G. Rutgers and Louisville made their inaugural appearances in the event. Boston College did not play due to the ACC having one more team than the B1G. First Challenge in which Maryland represented the B1G, as they left the ACC following the 2013–14 season.

== Rankings ==
The Big Ten had 6 teams ranked and 2 others receiving votes in the preseason Coaches' Poll and 5 teams ranked and 4 others receiving votes in the preseason AP Poll.

Legend
	Improvement in ranking
	Drop in ranking
	Not ranked previous week
RV	Received votes but were not ranked in Top 25 of poll
(Italics)	Number of first place votes

		Pre/ Wk 1	Wk 2	Wk 3	Wk 4	Wk 5	Wk 6	Wk 7	Wk 8	Wk 9	Wk 10	Wk 11	Wk 12	Wk 13	Wk 14	Wk 15	Wk 16	Wk 17	Wk 18	Wk 19	Final
Illinois	AP	RV	RV	RV	24	RV															
Illinois	C	RV	RV	RV	25	25	RV	RV	RV												
Indiana	AP			RV		RV		RV	RV	RV	RV	23	22	RV	RV	RV					
Indiana	C			RV				RV	RV	RV	RV	23	21	25	RV						
Iowa	AP	RV	RV			RV				RV		25			RV				RV	RV	
Iowa	C	25	25	RV		RV	RV			RV		RV			RV	RV			RV		RV
Maryland	AP	RV	RV	RV	21	19	17	15	12	11	14	13	16	17	19	15	14	10	8	12	
Maryland	C				22	20	18	15	11	9	11	8	13	16	19	16	14	9	8	12	16
Michigan	AP	24	24	19	17	RV															
Michigan	C	23	22	18	16	RV															
Michigan State	AP	18	19	20	19	RV	25				RV	RV		RV		RV	RV		RV	23	
Michigan State	C	18	19	19	18	23	22	RV			RV	RV		RV		RV	25	RV	RV	22	7
Minnesota	AP	RV	RV	RV				RV	RV												
Minnesota	C	RV	RV	RV			RV	RV	RV	RV											
Nebraska	AP	21	21	RV	RV																
Nebraska	C	21	21	RV	RV	RV															
Northwestern	AP																				
Northwestern	C																				
Ohio State	AP	20	20	16	14	12	12	21	20	22	RV	RV	RV	20	23	24	RV	23	RV	RV	
Ohio State	C	20	20	17	13	12	12	18	18	20	25	RV	RV	20	21	23	RV	25	RV	RV	RV
Penn State	AP						RV	RV	RV												
Penn State	C						RV	RV	RV												
Purdue	AP																		RV	RV	
Purdue	C																RV	RV	RV	RV	RV
Rutgers	AP																				
Rutgers	C																				
Wisconsin	AP	3 (8)	3 (7)	2 (3)	2 (3)	5	5	6	4	4	7	6	5	5	5	5	5	6	6	3	
Wisconsin	C	4 (3)	4 (2)	3 (2)	4 (2)	6	6	6	4	4	6	5	5	4	4	4	4	5	5	3	2

== Player of the week ==
Throughout the conference regular season, the Big Ten offices named one or two players of the week and one or two freshmen of the week each Monday.

Big Ten recruits at the 2014 McDonald's All-American Boys Game

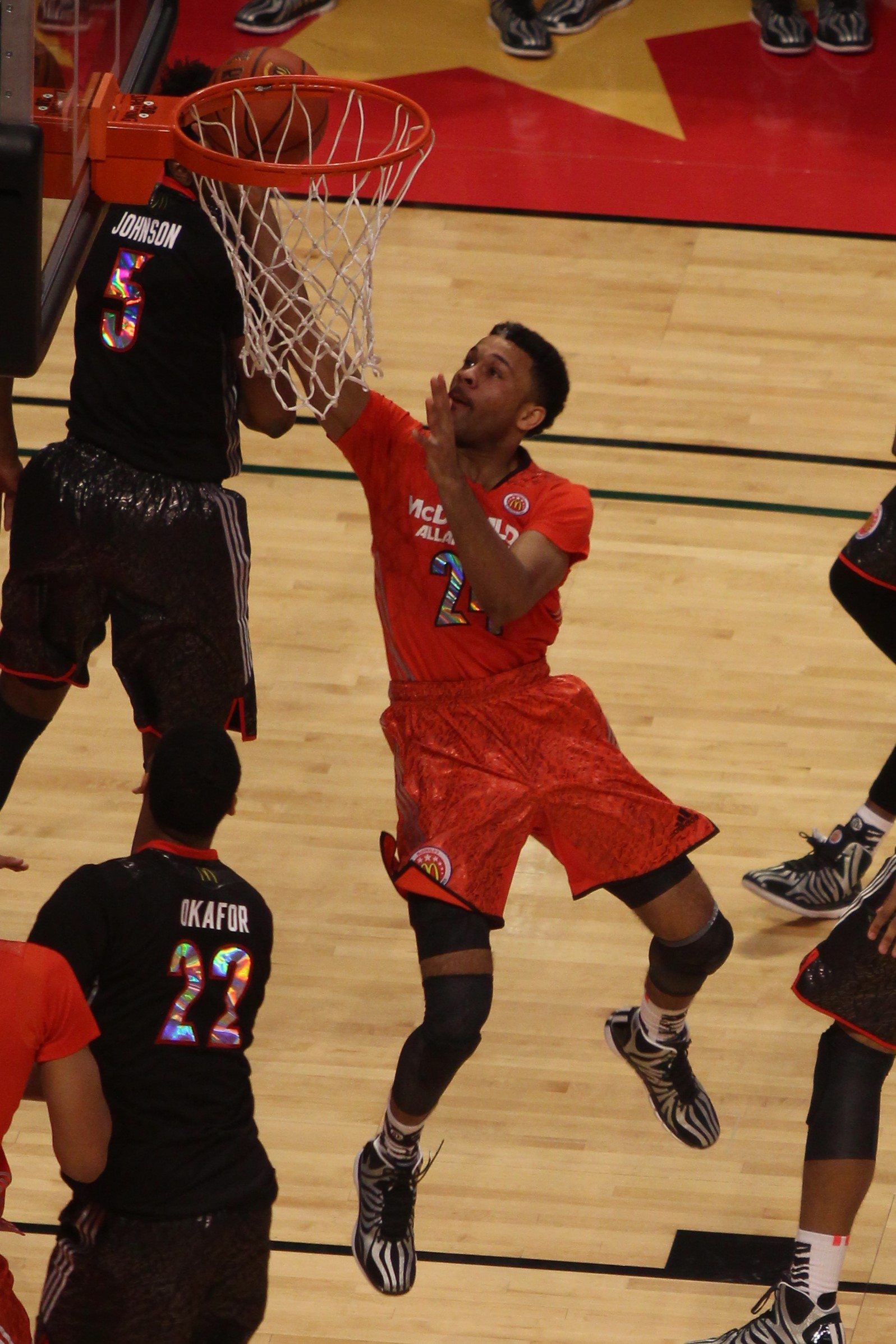
James Blackmon, Jr., Indiana

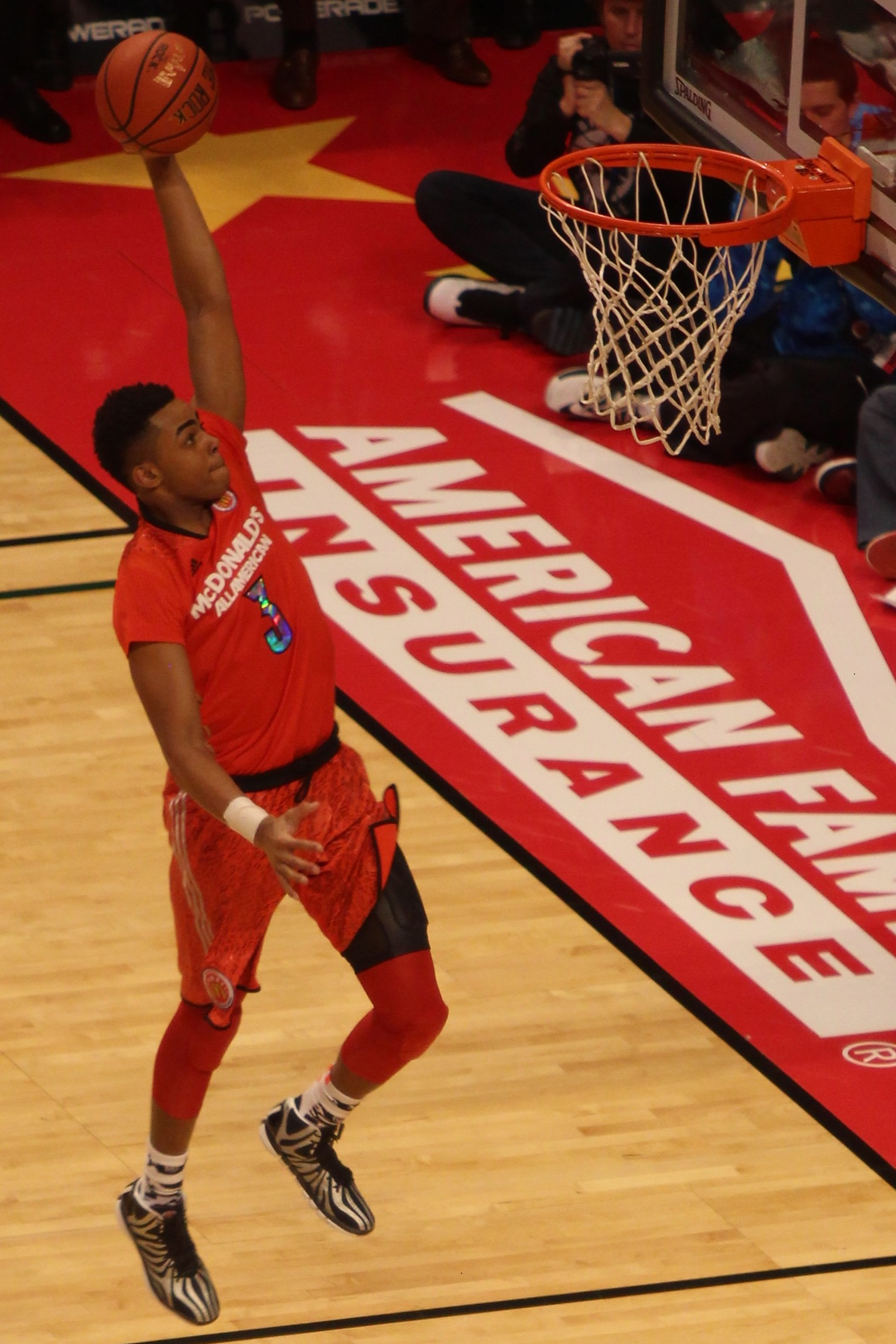
D'Angelo Russell, Ohio State

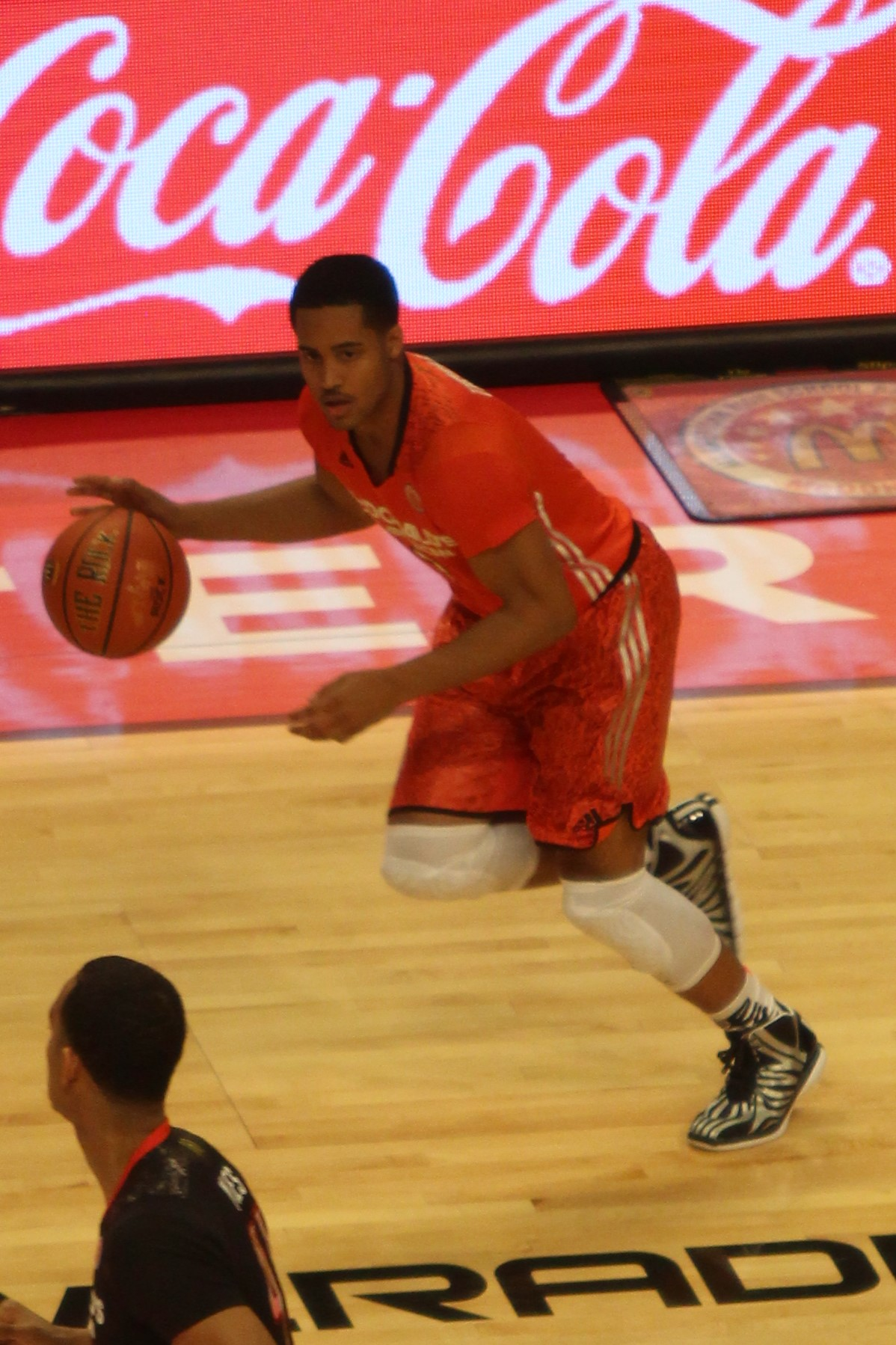
Melo Trimble, Maryland

2014 McDonald's All-Americans accounted for a dozen Freshman of the Week awards and three Player of the Week awards.

Week	Player of the week	Freshman of the week
November 17, 2014	Travis Trice, MSU	Vincent Edwards, PUR
November 24, 2014	Shannon Scott, OSU	James Blackmon, Jr., IND
November 24, 2014	Frank Kaminsky, WIS	James Blackmon, Jr., IND
December 1, 2014	Melo Trimble, MAR	Melo Trimble, MAR
December 1, 2014	D. J. Newbill, PSU	Melo Trimble, MAR
December 8, 2014	Andre Hollins, MINN	D'Angelo Russell, OSU
December 15, 2014	Maurice Walker, MINN	Melo Trimble (2), MAR
December 15, 2014	Maurice Walker, MINN	Bryant McIntosh, NU
December 22, 2014	Jake Layman, MAR	Nate Mason, MINN
December 22, 2014	Troy Williams, IND	Nate Mason, MINN
December 29, 2014	Frank Kaminsky (2), WIS	D'Angelo Russell (2), OSU
January 6, 2015	Jarrod Uthoff, IOWA	Vincent Edwards (2), PUR
January 12, 2015	Travis Trice (2), MSU	James Blackmon, Jr. (2), IND
January 19, 2015	Jake Layman (2), MAR	D'Angelo Russell (3), OSU
January 26, 2015	D'Angelo Russell, OSU	D'Angelo Russell (4), OSU
February 2, 2015	Malcolm Hill, ILL	D'Angelo Russell (5), OSU
February 2, 2015	Branden Dawson, MSU	D'Angelo Russell (5), OSU
February 9, 2015	D'Angelo Russell (2), OSU	D'Angelo Russell (6), OSU
February 16, 2015	Dez Wells, MAR	Vincent Edwards (3), PUR
February 16, 2015	Frank Kaminsky (3), WIS	Vincent Edwards (3), PUR
February 23, 2015	A. J. Hammons, PUR	Vic Law, NU
March 2, 2015	Aaron White, IOWA	Melo Trimble (3), MAR
March 2, 2015	Aaron White, IOWA	D'Angelo Russell (7), OSU
March 9, 2015	Dez Wells (2), MAR	Aubrey Dawkins, MICH
March 9, 2015	Frank Kaminsky (4), WIS	Aubrey Dawkins, MICH

On December 23, 2014, Troy Williams was named Oscar Robertson National Player of the Week by the United States Basketball Writers Association. On January 13, Travis Trice earned Oscar Robertson National Player of the Week recognition. On both January 27 and February 10, D'Angelo Russell was named Wayman Tisdale National Freshman of the Week. On the 27th, he was also named Oscar Robertson National Player of the Week.

== Watchlists ==
Ferrell, Kaminsky, Trimble and Russell made the John R. Wooden Award Midseason Top 25 list on January 14. On January 23, Dekker, Kaminsky and Trimble were named to the 17-man 2015 Oscar Robertson Trophy Midseason Watch List and Blackmon, Russell and Trimble were named to the 14-man 2015 Integris Wayman Tisdale Award Midseason Watch List. On that same day, Newbill and Kaminsky were named to the 30-man 2014–15 Senior CLASS Award Candidates. In February, Newbill and Kaminsky advanced to among the 10 finalists for the Senior CLASS Award. Kaminsky and Russell were both named to the Naismith Trophy Award Midseason Top 30 Watch List. Colby Wollenman (Michigan State), Mike Gesell and Jarrod Uthoff (Iowa) and Shavon Shields (Nebraska) all made their respective Academic All-District teams on February 5, placing them among the 40 finalists for the 15 man Academic All-American team to be announced on February 28. The following players were finalists for positional awards: Bob Cousy Award: Ferrell and Trimble; Julius Erving Award: Dawson and Denzel Valentine, Petteway and Dekker; Karl Malone Award: Aaron White and Jake Layman; Jerry West Award: Blackmon and Russell; Kareem Abdul-Jabbar Award: Kaminsky. On March 2, Kaminsky and Russell were named to the 14-man 2015 Oscar Robertson Trophy Finalist List and Blackmon, Russell and Trimble were named to the 2015 10-man Integris Wayman Tisdale Award Finalist List.

== Honors and awards ==
Kaminsky won numerous national player of the year awards, including NABC Player of the Year, Oscar Robertson Trophy, Naismith College Player of the Year, John R. Wooden Award, and Associated Press College Basketball Player of the Year.

The United States Basketball Writers Association named Michigan's Austin Hatch as its recipient for the U.S. Basketball Writers Association's Most Courageous Award for 2015. The College Sports Information Directors of America selected Shavon Shields of Nebraska and Mike Gesell of Iowa to its Capital One Academic All-America first and third teams, respectively. Both Russell and Trimble were named to the 2015 USBWA Freshman All-America Team by the United States Basketball Writers Association.

Conference players received lots of recognition as 2015 NCAA Men's Basketball All-Americans: Kaminsky and Russell were both first-team selections by The Sporting News, while Trimble was a second team choice. Kaminsky and Russell were first team selections by the United States Basketball Writers Association (USBWA). Kaminsky and Russell were the inaugural winners of the Kareem Abdul-Jabbar Award and Jerry West Award. Colby Wollenman won the Elite 89 Award.

=== All-Big Ten Awards and Teams ===
On March 9, The Big Ten announced most of its conference awards.

Honor	Coaches	Media
Player of the Year	Frank Kaminsky, Wisconsin	Frank Kaminsky, Wisconsin
Coach of the Year	Bo Ryan, Wisconsin	Mark Turgeon, Maryland
Freshman of the Year	D'Angelo Russell, Ohio State	D'Angelo Russell, Ohio State
Defensive Player of the Year	Rapheal Davis, Purdue	Not Selected
Sixth Man of the Year	Gabe Olaseni, Iowa	Not Selected
All-Big Ten First Team	Yogi Ferrell, Indiana	Yogi Ferrell, Indiana
All-Big Ten First Team	Aaron White, Iowa	Aaron White, Iowa
All-Big Ten First Team	Frank Kaminsky, Wisconsin	Frank Kaminsky, Wisconsin
All-Big Ten First Team	D'Angelo Russell, Ohio State	D'Angelo Russell, Ohio State
All-Big Ten First Team	Dez Wells, Maryland	Melo Trimble, Maryland
All-Big Ten Second Team	Melo Trimble, Maryland	Dez Wells, Maryland
All-Big Ten Second Team	D. J. Newbill, Penn State	D. J. Newbill, Penn State
All-Big Ten Second Team	Sam Dekker, Wisconsin	Sam Dekker, Wisconsin
All-Big Ten Second Team	Branden Dawson, Michigan State	Branden Dawson, Michigan State
All-Big Ten Second Team	A. J. Hammons, Purdue	A. J. Hammons, Purdue
All-Big Ten Third Team	Denzel Valentine, Michigan State	Denzel Valentine, Michigan State
All-Big Ten Third Team	Nigel Hayes, Wisconsin	Nigel Hayes, Wisconsin
All-Big Ten Third Team	Travis Trice, Michigan State	Travis Trice, Michigan State
All-Big Ten Third Team	Terran Petteway, Nebraska	Terran Petteway, Nebraska
All-Big Ten Third Team	Jarrod Uthoff, Iowa	Jake Layman, Maryland
All-Big Ten Honorable Mention	Jake Layman, Maryland	Jarrod Uthoff, Iowa
All-Big Ten Honorable Mention	Rayvonte Rice, Illinois	Rayvonte Rice, Illinois
All-Big Ten Honorable Mention	Malcolm Hill, Illinois	Malcolm Hill, Illinois
All-Big Ten Honorable Mention	Andre Hollins, Minnesota	Andre Hollins, Minnesota
All-Big Ten Honorable Mention	James Blackmon, Jr., Indiana	James Blackmon, Jr., Indiana
All-Big Ten Honorable Mention	Troy Williams, Indiana	Troy Williams, Indiana
All-Big Ten Honorable Mention	Tre Demps, Northwestern	Tre Demps, Northwestern
All-Big Ten Honorable Mention	Rapheal Davis, Purdue	Rapheal Davis, Purdue
All-Big Ten Honorable Mention	Jon Octeus, Purdue	Jon Octeus, Purdue
All-Big Ten Honorable Mention	Not Selected	Maurice Walker, Minnesota
All-Big Ten Honorable Mention	Not Selected	Alex Olah, Northwestern
All-Big Ten Honorable Mention	Not Selected	Shannon Scott, Ohio State
All-Big Ten Honorable Mention	Not Selected	Sam Thompson, Ohio State
All-Big Ten Honorable Mention	Not Selected	Myles Mack, Rutgers
All-Freshman Team	James Blackmon, Jr., Indiana	Not Selected
All-Freshman Team	D'Angelo Russell, Ohio State	Not Selected
All-Freshman Team	Melo Trimble, Maryland	Not Selected
All-Freshman Team	Bryant McIntosh, Northwestern	Not Selected
All-Freshman Team	Jae'Sean Tate, Ohio State	Not Selected
All-Defensive Team	Nnanna Egwu, Illinois	Not Selected
All-Defensive Team	Branden Dawson, Michigan State	Not Selected
All-Defensive Team	Rapheal Davis, Purdue	Not Selected
All-Defensive Team	A. J. Hammons, Purdue	Not Selected
All-Defensive Team	Josh Gasser, Wisconsin	Not Selected

=== NABC ===
The National Association of Basketball Coaches announced their Division I All-District teams on March 27, recognizing the nation's best men's collegiate basketball student-athletes. Selected and voted on by member coaches of the NABC, the selections on this list were then eligible for NABC Coaches' All-America Honors. The following list represented the District 7 players chosen to the list.

First Team

- Frank Kaminsky Wisconsin
- D'Angelo Russell Ohio State
- Yogi Ferrell Indiana
- Melo Trimble Maryland
- A. J. Hammons Purdue

Second Team

- Sam Dekker Wisconsin
- D. J. Newbill Penn State
- Aaron White Iowa
- Dez Wells Maryland
- Branden Dawson Michigan State

=== USBWA ===
On March 10, the U.S. Basketball Writers Association released its 2014–15 Men's All-District Teams, based upon voting from its national membership. There were nine regions from coast to coast, and a player and coach of the year were selected in each. The following lists all the Big Ten representatives selected within their respective regions.

District II (NY, NJ, DE, DC, PA, WV)
- D. J. Newbill, Penn State
District III (VA, NC, SC, MD)
- Melo Trimble, Maryland
- Dez Wells, Maryland
District V (OH, IN, IL, MI, MN, WI)

Player of the Year

- Frank Kaminsky, Wisconsin

Coach of the Year

- Bo Ryan, Wisconsin

All-District Team

- Branden Dawson, Michigan State
- Sam Dekker, Wisconsin
- Yogi Ferrell, Indiana
- A. J. Hammons, Purdue
- Frank Kaminsky, Wisconsin
- D'Angelo Russell, Ohio State
- Denzel Valentine, Michigan State
District VI (IA, MO, KS, OK, NE, ND, SD)
- Aaron White, Iowa

== Postseason ==
=== Big Ten tournament ===
- March 11–15, 2015 Big Ten Conference men's basketball tournament, United Center, Chicago.

2014 Big Ten Conference men's basketball tournament seeds and results
Seed	School	Conf.	Over.	Tiebreaker	First round March 11	Second round March 12	Quarterfinals March 13	Semifinals March 14	Championship March 15
1	Wisconsin ‡ #	16–2	28–3		Bye	Bye	Defeated Michigan 71–60	Defeated Purdue 71–51	Defeated Michigan State 80–69
2	Maryland #	14–4	26–5		Bye	Bye	Defeated Indiana 75–69	Eliminated by Michigan State 58–62	
3	Michigan State #	12–6	21–10	2–0 vs Purdue, Iowa	Bye	Bye	Defeated Ohio State 76–67	Defeated Maryland 62–58	Eliminated by Wisconsin 69–80
4	Purdue #	12–6	20–11	1–1 vs Michigan State, Iowa	Bye	Bye	Defeated Penn State 64–59	Eliminated by Wisconsin 51–71	
5	Iowa	12–6	21–10	0–2 vs Michigan State, Purdue	Bye	Eliminated by Penn State 69–72			
6	Ohio State	11–7	22–9		Bye	Defeated Minnesota 79–73	Eliminated by Michigan State 67–76		
7	Indiana	9–9	19–12	1–0 vs Illinois	Bye	Defeated Northwestern 71–56	Eliminated by Maryland 69–75		
8	Illinois	9–9	19–12	0–1 vs Indiana	Bye	Eliminated by Michigan 55–73			
9	Michigan	8–10	15–15		Bye	Defeated Illinois 73–55	Eliminated by Wisconsin 60–71		
10	Northwestern	6–12	15–16	1–0 vs Minnesota	Bye	Eliminated by Indiana 56–71			
11	Minnesota	6–12	17–14	0–1 vs Northwestern	Defeated Rutgers 88–68	Eliminated by Ohio State 73–79			
12	Nebraska	5–13	13–17		Eliminated by Penn State 65–68				
13	Penn State	4–14	16–15		Defeated Nebraska 68–65	Defeated Iowa 67–58	Eliminated by Purdue 59–64		
14	Rutgers	2–16	10–21		Eliminated by Minnesota 68–80				
‡ – Big Ten regular season champions, and tournament No. 1 seed. # – Received a bye in the conference tournament. Overall records include all games prior to the Big Ten tournament.

=== NCAA tournament ===
The Big Ten Conference had seven bids to the 2015 NCAA Men's Division I Basketball Tournament. Michigan State and Wisconsin both reached the final four, with Wisconsin losing to Duke in the Championship Game.

Seed	Region	School	First Four	Round of 64	Round of 32	Sweet 16	Elite Eight	Final Four	Championship
1	West	Wisconsin	n/a	Defeated Coastal Carolina 86–72	Defeated Oregon 72–65	Defeated North Carolina 79–72	Defeated Arizona 85–78	Defeated Kentucky 71–64	Eliminated by Duke 63–68
4	Midwest	Maryland	n/a	Defeated Valparaiso 65–62	Eliminated by West Virginia 59–69				
7	East	Michigan State	n/a	Defeated Georgia 70–63	Defeated Virginia 60–54	Defeated Oklahoma 62–58	Defeated Louisville 76–70 OT	Eliminated by Duke 61–81	
7	South	Iowa	n/a	Defeated Davidson 83–52	Eliminated by Gonzaga 68–87				
9	Midwest	Purdue	n/a	Eliminated by Cincinnati 65–66 (OT)					
10	Midwest	Indiana	n/a	Eliminated by Wichita State 76–81					
10	West	Ohio State	n/a	Defeated VCU 75–72 (OT)	Eliminated by Arizona 58–73				
		W–L (%):	0–0 (–)	5–2 (.714)	2–3 (.400)	2–0 (1.000)	2–0 (1.000)	1–1 (.500)	0–1 (.000) Total: 12–7 (.632)

=== National Invitation tournament ===
Illinois earned the lone NIT bid for the conference.

Seed	Bracket	School	First round	Second round	Quarterfinals	Semifinals	Finals
3	Richmond	Illinois	Eliminated by Alabama 58–79				
		W–L (%):	0–1 (.000)	0–0 (–)	0–0 (–)	0–0 (–)	0–0 (–) Total: 0–1 (.000)

=== 2015 NBA draft ===
The following all-conference selections were listed as seniors: Frank Kaminsky, Aaron White, Dez Wells, D. J. Newbill, Branden Dawson, and Travis Trice. Sam Dekker, Terran Petteway, Walter Pitchford, and D'Angelo Russell declared early for the NBA draft before the April 26 deadline, but had until June 15 to withdraw their names. On May 7, Dekker, Dawson, Kaminsky, White, Wells, Pettaway, and Russell were invited to the NBA draft combine. Russell, Kaminsky, Dekkar, White and Dawson were drafted.

Rnd.	Pick	Player	Pos.	Nationality	Team	School / club team
1	2	D'Angelo Russell	PG	United States	Los Angeles Lakers	Ohio State (Fr.)
1	9	Frank Kaminsky	PF/C	United States	Charlotte Hornets	Wisconsin (Sr.)
1	18	Sam Dekker	SF	United States	Houston Rockets (from New Orleans) (Note: July 15, 2014: New Orleans Pelicans to Houston Rockets (three-team trade with Washington Wizards): Houston acquired Alonzo Gee, Scotty Hopson and a conditional 2015 first-round pick (protected top 3 and 20–30 in 2015) from New Orleans; Houston acquired Trevor Ariza from Washington (sign and trade); New Orleans acquired Ömer Aşık, Omri Casspi and cash considerations from Houston; Washington acquired Melvin Ely from New Orleans)	Wisconsin (Jr.)
2	49	Aaron White	PF	United States	Washington Wizards	Iowa (Sr.)
2	56	Branden Dawson	SF	United States	New Orleans Pelicans (from Memphis (Note: January 12, 2015: Memphis Grizzlies to New Orleans Pelicans (three-team trade with Boston Celtics): New Orleans acquired Quincy Pondexter and a 2015 second-round pick from Memphis; Memphis acquired Russ Smith from New Orleans; Memphis acquired Jeff Green from Boston; Boston acquired Tayshaun Prince and a conditional first-round pick from Memphis; Boston acquired Austin Rivers from New Orleans), traded to L.A. Clippers) (Note: New Orleans Pelicans and Los Angeles Clippers trade: L.A. Clippers acquired draft rights to 56th pick Branden Dawson; New Orleans acquired cash considerations)	Michigan State (Sr.)

==== Pre-draft trades ====
Prior to the day of the draft, the following trades were made and resulted in exchanges of draft picks between the teams.

==== Draft-day trades ====
The following trades involving drafted players were made on the day of the draft.

=== International play ===
On June 18, 2015 incoming Purdue commit Caleb Swanigan was announced as a member of the 12-man 2015 USA Basketball Men's U19 World Championship Team for the 2015 FIBA Under-19 World Championship. The team won the gold medal. Issac Haas (Purdue), Nigel Hayes (Wisconsin), Malcolm Hill (Illinois), Romelo Trimble (Maryland); Denzel Valentine (Michigan State) were among the 22 players selected to try out for the 12-man Team USA at the 2015 Pan American Games. Hayes Trimble and Valentine were among the 16 finalists for the team. Trimble and Valentine made the final 12-man team. The team earned the bronze medal.
