= 2014–15 Penn State Nittany Lions basketball team =

American college basketball season

2014–15 Penn State Nittany Lions men's basketball
- Conference: Big Ten Conference
- Record: 18–16 (4–14 Big Ten)
- Head coach: Pat Chambers
- Assistant coaches: Eugene Burroughs; Brian Daly; Dwayne Anderson
- Home arena: Bryce Jordan Center

2014–15 Big Ten Conference men's basketball standings
	Conf.				Overall
Team	W		L	PCT	W		L	PCT
No. 3 Wisconsin †	16	–	2	.889	36	–	4	.900
No. 12 Maryland	14	–	4	.778	28	–	7	.800
No. 23 Michigan State	12	–	6	.667	27	–	12	.692
Iowa	12	–	6	.667	22	–	12	.647
Purdue	12	–	6	.667	21	–	13	.618
Ohio State	11	–	7	.611	24	–	11	.686
Indiana	9	–	9	.500	20	–	14	.588
Illinois	9	–	9	.500	19	–	14	.576
Michigan	8	–	10	.444	16	–	16	.500
Minnesota	6	–	12	.333	18	–	15	.545
Northwestern	6	–	12	.333	15	–	17	.469
Nebraska	5	–	13	.278	13	–	18	.419
Penn State	4	–	14	.222	18	–	16	.529
Rutgers	2	–	16	.111	10	–	22	.313
† 2015 Big Ten tournament winner Rankings from AP poll

The 2014–15 Penn State Nittany Lions basketball team represented Pennsylvania State University. Head coach Pat Chambers coached his fourth season with the team. The team played its home games in University Park, Pennsylvania, US at the Bryce Jordan Center and were a member of the Big Ten Conference.

The Nittany Lions finished their non-conference portion of the season at 12–1. The 12 wins set a school record for most non-conference victories, as well as their best overall start since the 1995–96 team jumped to a 13–0 record.

== Previous season ==
The 2013–14 Penn State Nittany Lions finished the season with an overall record of 16–18, with a record of 6–12 in the Big Ten regular season for a three-way tie to finish in tenth place. In the 2014 Big Ten tournament, the Nittany Lions were defeated by Minnesota, 63–56 in the first round. They were invited to the 2014 College Basketball Invitational, in which they defeated Hampton in the first round before losing to Siena in quarterfinals.

== Off season ==
=== Departures ===
Name	Number	Pos.	Height	Weight	Year	Hometown	Notes
Graham Woodward	3	G	6'0"	170	Freshman	Edina, MN	Transfer to Drake
Tim Frazier	23	G	6'1"	170	RS Senior	Houston, TX	Graduated
Zach Cooper	24	G	6'1"	200	Senior	Ijamsville, MD	Graduated

=== Incoming transfers ===
Name	Number	Pos.	Height	Weight	Year	Hometown	Previous School
Devin Foster	3	G	6'2"	195	Junior	Dayton, OH	Vincennes University

== Incoming recruits ==
College recruiting
Name	Hometown	School	Height	Weight	Commit date
Shep Garner; PG	Philadelphia, PA	Roman Catholic	6 ft 2 in (1.88 m)	180 lb (82 kg)	Jun 15, 2013
Shep Garner; PG	Recruit ratings: Scout: Rivals: 247Sports: ESPN:				
Isaiah Washington; SG	Williamsport, PA	Williamsport	6 ft 3 in (1.91 m)	180 lb (82 kg)	Apr 1, 2012
Isaiah Washington; SG	Recruit ratings: Scout: Rivals: 247Sports: ESPN:				
Overall recruit ranking:
Note: In many cases, Scout, Rivals, 247Sports, On3, and ESPN may conflict in their listings of height and weight.; In these cases, the average was taken. ESPN grades are on a 100-point scale.; Sources: "2014 Team Ranking". Rivals.

== Personnel ==
=== Roster ===
2014–15 Penn State Nittany Lions men's basketball team
Players
Coaches

Pos.	#	Name	Height	Weight	Year	Previous school	Hometown
F	0	Payton Banks	6 ft 6 in (1.98 m)	220 lb (100 kg)	RS Fr	Lutheran HS	Orange, CA
G	1	John Johnson	6 ft 1 in (1.85 m)	175 lb (79 kg)	RS Jr	Life Center Acad/Pittsburgh	Philadelphia, PA
G	2	D. J. Newbill	6 ft 4 in (1.93 m)	205 lb (93 kg)	RS Sr	Strawberry Mansion HS	Philadelphia, PA
G	3	Devin Foster	6 ft 2 in (1.88 m)	205 lb (93 kg)	Jr	Jefferson Township HS/Vincennes	Dayton, OH
F	5	Donovan Jack	6 ft 9 in (2.06 m)	210 lb (95 kg)	Jr	Berks Catholic High School	Reading, PA
F	10	Brandon Taylor	6 ft 7 in (2.01 m)	235 lb (107 kg)	Jr	Trenton Catholic Acad	Tabernacle, NJ
G	11	Samuel Halle (W)	6 ft 0 in (1.83 m)	185 lb (84 kg)	Jr	West Springfield High School	Springfield, VA
G	13	Geno Thorpe	6 ft 3 in (1.91 m)	180 lb (82 kg)	So	Shaler Area HS	Pittsburgh, PA
G	14	Kevin Montminy	6 ft 3 in (1.91 m)	185 lb (84 kg)	Sr	Penns Valley Area	Centre Hall, PA
G	21	Isaiah Washington	6 ft 3 in (1.91 m)	180 lb (82 kg)	Fr	Williamsport Area HS	Williamsport, PA
C	32	Jordan Dickerson	7 ft 0 in (2.13 m)	240 lb (109 kg)	Jr	IMG Academy/Abraham Lincoln HS/SMU	Brooklyn, NY
G	33	Shep Garner	6 ft 2 in (1.88 m)	180 lb (82 kg)	Fr	Roman Catholic HS	Philadelphia, PA
F	34	Alan Wisniewski	6 ft 9 in (2.06 m)	230 lb (104 kg)	RS Sr	Bishop Foley Catholic High School	Sterling Heights, MI
F	43	Ross Travis	6 ft 6 in (1.98 m)	225 lb (102 kg)	Sr	Chaska HS	Chaska, MN
F	44	Julian Moore	6 ft 10 in (2.08 m)	215 lb (98 kg)	RS Fr	Germantown Acad	Fort Washington, PA

Head coach

- Pat Chambers (Philadelphia)

Assistant coach(es)

- Brian Daly (Saint Joseph's)
- Keith Urgo (Fairfield)
- Dwayne Anderson (Villanova)

Legend

- (C) Team captain
- (S) Suspended
- (I) Ineligible
- (W) Walk-on
- Injured
- Current redshirt

Roster

=== Coaching staff ===
Position	Name	Year	Alma mater
Head coach	Patrick Chambers	2011	Philadelphia University (1994)
Associate head coach	Keith Urgo	2011	Fairfield University (2002)
Associate head coach	Brian Daly	2011	Saint Joseph's University (1992)
Assistant coach	Dwayne Anderson	2013	Villanova University (2009)
Director of Basketball Operations	Ross Condon	2011	Villanova University (2007)
On campus recruiting coordinator	David Caporaletti	2011	Philadelphia University (1993)
Athletic trainer	Jon Salazer	2001	Penn State (1993)
Director of player development	Ryan Devlin	2013	Philadelphia University (2005)
Strength and conditioning coach	Brandon Spayd	2013	Juniata College (2010)
Graduate Manager	Nicholas Colella	2013	Penn State (2013)
Graduate Manager	D.J. Irving	2014	Boston University (2014)

== Schedule and results ==
Date time, TV	Rank^{#}	Opponent^{#}	Result	Record	Site (attendance) city, state
Non-conference regular season
Nov 14*; 7:00 pm		Morgan State	W 61–48	1–0	Bryce Jordan Center (7,402); University Park, PA
Nov 16*; 5:00 pm, BTN		Fordham	W 73–54	2–0	Bryce Jordan Center (8,607); University Park, PA
Nov 20*; 5:30 pm, ESPNU		vs. Charlotte; Charleston Classic quarterfinals	L 97–106 ^{2OT}	2–1	TD Arena (2,517); Charleston, SC
Nov 21*; 9:00 pm, ESPN3		vs. Cornell; Charleston Classic consolation round	W 72–71	3–1	TD Arena (2,430); Charleston, SC
Nov 23*; 3:30 pm, ESPN3		vs. USC; Charleston Classic 5th place game	W 63–61	4–1	TD Arena (1,220); Charleston, SC
Nov 25*; 7:30 pm, ESPN3		Akron	W 78–72	5–1	Bryce Jordan Center (6,703); University Park, PA
Nov 28*; 4:00 pm		at Bucknell	W 88–80	6–1	Sojka Pavilion (4,257); Lewisburg, PA
Dec 3*; 7:15 pm, ESPNU		Virginia Tech; ACC–Big Ten Challenge	W 61–58	7–1	Bryce Jordan Center (7,326); University Park, PA
Dec 6*; 6:00 pm, CBSSN		at Marshall	W 73–69	8–1	Cam Henderson Center (5,158); Huntington, WV
Dec 10*; 9:00 pm, BTN		Duquesne	W 64–62	9–1	Bryce Jordan Center (6,565); University Park, PA
Dec 14*; 12:00 pm, ESPN3		George Washington	W 64–51	10–1	Bryce Jordan Center (9,991); University Park, PA
Dec 20*; 2:00 pm, ESPN3		vs. Drexel	W 73–68	11–1	PPL Center (4,914); Allentown, PA
Dec 22*; 4:00 pm		Dartmouth	W 69–49	12–1	Bryce Jordan Center (6,127); University Park, PA
Big Ten regular season
Dec 31; 1:00 pm, BTN		at No. 4 Wisconsin	L 72–89	12–2 (0–1)	Kohl Center (17,279); Madison, WI
Jan 3; 7:30 pm, ESPN2		at Rutgers	L 46–50	12–3 (0–2)	The RAC (7,158); Piscataway, NJ
Jan 6; 7:00 pm, BTN		Michigan	L 64–73	12–4 (0–3)	Bryce Jordan Center (5,342); University Park, PA
Jan 13; 7:00 pm, BTN		at Indiana	L 73–76	12–5 (0–4)	Assembly Hall (17,472); Bloomington, IN
Jan 17; 1:00 pm, ESPNU		Purdue	L 77–84 ^{OT}	12–6 (0–5)	Bryce Jordan Center (8,949); University Park, PA
Jan 21; 7:00 pm, BTN		at Michigan State	L 60–66	12–7 (0–6)	Breslin Center (14,797); East Lansing, MI
Jan 24; 12:00 pm, ESPNU		Rutgers	W 79–51	13–7 (1–6)	Bryce Jordan Center (8,281); University Park, PA
Jan 28; 7:00 pm, BTN		Minnesota	W 63–58	14–7 (2–6)	Bryce Jordan Center (6,100); University Park, PA
Jan 31; 1:00 pm, BTN		at Illinois	L 58–60	14–8 (2–7)	State Farm Center (14,597); Champaign, IL
Feb 4; 8:30 pm, BTN		at No. 17 Maryland	L 58–64	14–9 (2–8)	Xfinity Center (14,195); College Park, MD
Feb 7; 4:00 pm, ESPNU		Nebraska	W 56–43	15–9 (3–8)	Bryce Jordan Center (11,702); University Park, PA
Feb 11; 7:00 pm, BTN		at No. 23 Ohio State	L 55-75	15–10 (3–9)	Value City Arena (13,262); Columbus, OH
Feb 14; 8:30 pm, BTN		No. 19 Maryland	L 73–76	15–11 (3–10)	Bryce Jordan Center (8,303); University Park, PA
Feb 18; 7:00 pm, BTN		No. 5 Wisconsin	L 47–55	15–12 (3–11)	Bryce Jordan Center (7,132); University Park, PA
Feb 21; 3:00 pm, ESPNU		at Northwestern	L 39–60	15–13 (3–12)	Welsh-Ryan Arena (7,317); Evanston, IL
Feb 28; 6:00 pm, ESPNU		Iowa	L 77–81 ^{OT}	15–14 (3–13)	Bryce Jordan Center (9,894); University Park, PA
Mar 4; 6:00 pm, BTN		No. 23 Ohio State	L 67–77	15–15 (3–14)	Bryce Jordan Center (8,745); University Park, PA
Mar 8; 1:00 pm, BTN		at Minnesota	W 79–76	16–15 (4–14)	Williams Arena (12,412); Minneapolis, MN
Big Ten tournament
Mar 11; 4:30 pm, ESPN2		vs. Nebraska; First round	W 68–65	17–15	United Center; Chicago, IL
Mar 12; 2:30 pm, BTN		vs. Iowa; Second round	W 67–58	18–15	United Center; Chicago, IL
Mar 13; 2:30 pm, ESPN		vs. Purdue; Quarterfinals	L 59–64	18–16	United Center; Chicago, IL
*Non-conference game. ^{#}Rankings from AP poll. (#) Tournament seedings in parentheses. All times are in Eastern Time.

Source -

== See also ==
- 2014–15 Penn State Lady Lions basketball team
