= 2014–15 Iowa Hawkeyes men's basketball team =

American college basketball season

2014–15 Iowa Hawkeyes men's basketball

NCAA tournament, round of 32
- Conference: Big Ten Conference
- Record: 22–12 (12–6 Big Ten)
- Head coach: Fran McCaffery (5th season)
- Assistant coaches: Sherman Dillard; Andrew Francis; Kirk Speraw
- Home arena: Carver–Hawkeye Arena (Capacity: 15,400)

2014–15 Big Ten Conference men's basketball standings
	Conf.				Overall
Team	W		L	PCT	W		L	PCT
No. 3 Wisconsin †	16	–	2	.889	36	–	4	.900
No. 12 Maryland	14	–	4	.778	28	–	7	.800
No. 23 Michigan State	12	–	6	.667	27	–	12	.692
Iowa	12	–	6	.667	22	–	12	.647
Purdue	12	–	6	.667	21	–	13	.618
Ohio State	11	–	7	.611	24	–	11	.686
Indiana	9	–	9	.500	20	–	14	.588
Illinois	9	–	9	.500	19	–	14	.576
Michigan	8	–	10	.444	16	–	16	.500
Minnesota	6	–	12	.333	18	–	15	.545
Northwestern	6	–	12	.333	15	–	17	.469
Nebraska	5	–	13	.278	13	–	18	.419
Penn State	4	–	14	.222	18	–	16	.529
Rutgers	2	–	16	.111	10	–	22	.313
† 2015 Big Ten tournament winner Rankings from AP poll

The 2014–15 Iowa Hawkeyes men's basketball team represented the University of Iowa in the 2014–15 NCAA Division I men's basketball season. The team was led by fifth-year head coach Fran McCaffery and played their home games at Carver-Hawkeye Arena. They were members of the Big Ten Conference. They finished the season 22–12, 12–6 in Big Ten play to finish in a three-way tie for third place. They lost in the second round of the Big Ten tournament to Penn State. They received an at-large bid to the NCAA tournament where they defeated Davidson in the second round before losing in the third round to Gonzaga.

== Last season ==
The team finished the previous season with a record of 20–13, 9-9 in Big Ten play and finished 6th in the Big Ten. They lost in the first round in the 2014 Big Ten Conference men's basketball tournament to Northwestern. They received an at-large bid and lost in the NCAA First Four to Tennessee.

=== Departures ===
Name	Number	Pos.	Height	Weight	Year	Hometown	Notes
Melsahn Basabe	1	F	6'7"	220	Senior	Glen Cove, NY	Graduated
Roy Devyn Marble	4	G	6'6"	200	Senior	Southfield, MI	Graduated/2014 NBA draft
Zach McCabe	15	F	6'7"	235	Senior	Sioux City, IA	Graduated
Darius Stokes	35	F	6'7"	203	Junior	Cedar Rapids, IA	Transferred to Fairleigh Dickinson University
Kyle Meyer	42	F	6'10"	225	RS Freshman	Alpharetta, GA	Transferred to Eastern Florida State College

=== Incoming transfers ===
Name	Number	Pos.	Height	Weight	Year	Hometown	Previous School
Trey Dickerson	11	G	6'0"	180	Sophomore	Queens, NY	Williston State College

== Roster ==
2014–15 Iowa Hawkeyes men's basketball team
Players
Coaches

Pos.	#	Name	Height	Weight	Year	Hometown
C	0	Gabriel Olaseni	6 ft 10 in (2.08 m)	237 lb (108 kg)	Sr	London, England
G	1	Charlie Rose	6 ft 4 in (1.93 m)	175 lb (79 kg)	So	Elmhurst, IL
G	2	Josh Oglesby	6 ft 5 in (1.96 m)	200 lb (91 kg)	Sr	Cedar Rapids, IA
G	3	Peter Jok	6 ft 6 in (1.98 m)	200 lb (91 kg)	So	Des Moines, IA
G	5	Anthony Clemmons	6 ft 2 in (1.88 m)	195 lb (88 kg)	Jr	Lansing, MI
G	10	Mike Gesell	6 ft 2 in (1.88 m)	190 lb (86 kg)	Jr	South Sioux City, NE
G	11	Trey Dickerson	6 ft 1 in (1.85 m)	180 lb (82 kg)	So	Queens, NY
G	13	Kyle Denning	6 ft 1 in (1.85 m)	165 lb (75 kg)	Sr	Cedar Falls, IA
F	20	Jarrod Uthoff	6 ft 9 in (2.06 m)	210 lb (95 kg)	Jr	Cedar Rapids, IA
F	23	Okey Ukah (W)	6 ft 7 in (2.01 m)	220 lb (100 kg)	Jr	Iowa City, IA
G	24	Brady Ellingson	6 ft 4 in (1.93 m)	188 lb (85 kg)	Fr	Sussex, WI
F	25	Dom Uhl	6 ft 8 in (2.03 m)	195 lb (88 kg)	Fr	Frankfurt, Germany
F	30	Aaron White	6 ft 9 in (2.06 m)	228 lb (103 kg)	Sr	Strongsville, OH
C	34	Adam Woodbury	7 ft 1 in (2.16 m)	245 lb (111 kg)	Jr	Sioux City, IA
F	51	Nicholas Baer	6 ft 7 in (2.01 m)	187 lb (85 kg)	Fr	Bettendorf, IA

Head coach

- Fran McCaffery

Assistant coach(es)

- Sherman Dillard
- Andrew Francis
- Kirk Speraw

Athletic trainer(s)

- Brad Floy

Legend

- (C) Team captain
- (S) Suspended
- (I) Ineligible
- (W) Walk-on
- Injured
- Current redshirt

Roster

== 2014 commitments ==
College recruiting information
Name	Hometown	School	Height	Weight	Commit date
Dominique Uhl; PF	Point Pleasant, NJ	Point Pleasant Beach High School	6 ft 7 in (2.01 m)	185 lb (84 kg)	Oct 11, 2013
Dominique Uhl; PF	Recruit ratings: Scout: Rivals: 247Sports: ESPN:				
Brady Ellingson; SG	Menomonie, WI	Hamilton High School	6 ft 3 in (1.91 m)	170 lb (77 kg)	Sep 24, 2013
Brady Ellingson; SG	Recruit ratings: Scout: Rivals: 247Sports: ESPN:				
Overall recruit ranking:
Note: In many cases, Scout, Rivals, 247Sports, On3, and ESPN may conflict in their listings of height and weight.; In these cases, the average was taken. ESPN grades are on a 100-point scale.; Sources: "ESPN- Iowa Hawkeyes Men's Basketball Recruiting". ESPN.; "2014 Team Ranking". Rivals.

== Schedule and results ==
Date time, TV	Rank^{#}	Opponent^{#}	Result	Record	Site (attendance) city, state
Exhibition
Nov 2*; 2:00 pm		Northwood	W 92–51	–	Carver–Hawkeye Arena (14,054); Iowa City, IA
Non-conference regular season
Nov 14*; 8:30 pm, ESPN3		Hampton; 2K Sports Classic	W 90–56	1–0	Carver–Hawkeye Arena (14,682); Iowa City, IA
Nov 17*; 7:00 pm, ESPN3		North Dakota State; 2K Sports Classic	W 87–56	2–0	Carver–Hawkeye Arena (12,333); Iowa City, IA
Nov 20*; 6:00 pm, ESPN2		vs. No. 10 Texas; 2K Sports Classic semifinals	L 57–71	2–1	Madison Square Garden (11,541); New York City, NY
Nov 21*; 4:00 pm, ESPN2		vs. No. 23 Syracuse; 2K Sports Classic 3rd place game	L 63–66	2–2	Madison Square Garden (11,255); New York City, NY
Nov 24*; 7:00 pm, ESPN3		Pepperdine	W 72–61	3–2	Carver–Hawkeye Arena (12,979); Iowa City, IA
Nov 26*; 7:30 pm, ESPN3		Northern Illinois	W 70–49	4–2	Carver–Hawkeye Arena (14,357); Iowa City, IA
Nov 29*; 1:00 pm		Longwood	W 77–44	5–2	Carver–Hawkeye Arena (13,819); Iowa City, IA
Dec 3*; 6:30 pm, ESPN		at No. 12 North Carolina; ACC–Big Ten Challenge	W 60–55	6–2	Dean Smith Center (18,040); Chapel Hill, NC
Dec 6*; 12:00 pm, MC22		UMBC	W 77–47	7–2	Carver–Hawkeye Arena (13,094); Iowa City, IA
Dec 9*; 8:00 pm, ESPNews		Alcorn State	W 67–44	8–2	Carver–Hawkeye Arena (12,392); Iowa City, IA
Dec 12*; 7:00 pm, BTN		No. 14 Iowa State; Iowa Corn Cy-Hawk Series	L 75–90	8–3	Carver–Hawkeye Arena (15,400); Iowa City, IA
Dec 20*; 6:30 pm, BTN		vs. Northern Iowa; Big Four Classic	L 44–56	8–4	Wells Fargo Arena (15,124); Des Moines, IA
Dec 22*; 7:00 pm, ESPN3		North Florida	W 80–70	9–4	Carver–Hawkeye Arena (14,137); Iowa City, IA
Big Ten regular season
Dec 30; 12:00 pm, ESPN2		at No. 20 Ohio State	W 71–65	10–4 (1–0)	Value City Arena (15,189); Columbus, OH
Jan 5; 8:00 pm, BTN		Nebraska	W 70–59	11–4 (2–0)	Carver–Hawkeye Arena (12,789); Iowa City, IA
Jan 8; 6:00 pm, ESPN		Michigan State	L 61–75	11–5 (2–1)	Carver–Hawkeye Arena (15,054); Iowa City, IA
Jan 13; 8:00 pm, BTN		at Minnesota	W 77–75	12–5 (3–1)	Williams Arena (12,401); Minneapolis, MN
Jan 17; 1:00 pm, ESPN		Ohio State	W 76–67	13–5 (4–1)	Carver–Hawkeye Arena (15,400); Iowa City, IA
Jan 20; 8:00 pm, ESPN	No. 25	at No. 6 Wisconsin	L 50–82	13–6 (4–2)	Kohl Center (17,279); Madison, WI
Jan 24; 11:00 am, BTN	No. 25	at Purdue	L 63–67	13–7 (4–3)	Mackey Arena (12,068); West Lafayette, IN
Jan 31; 11:00 am, ESPN		No. 5 Wisconsin	L 63–74	13–8 (4–4)	Carver–Hawkeye Arena (15,400); Iowa City, IA
Feb 5; 6:00 pm, ESPN		at Michigan	W 72–54	14–8 (5–4)	Crisler Center (12,490); Ann Arbor, MI
Feb 8; 2:15 pm, BTN		No. 17 Maryland	W 71–55	15–8 (6–4)	Carver–Hawkeye Arena (15,400); Iowa City, IA
Feb 12; 6:00 pm, BTN		Minnesota	L 59–64	15–9 (6–5)	Carver–Hawkeye Arena (13,756); Iowa City, IA
Feb 15; 2:00 pm, BTN		at Northwestern	L 61–66 ^{OT}	15–10 (6–6)	Welsh-Ryan Arena (7,714); Evanston, IL
Feb 19; 7:00 pm, ESPNU		Rutgers	W 81–47	16–10 (7–6)	Carver–Hawkeye Arena (12,594); Iowa City, IA
Feb 22; 2:00 pm, BTN		at Nebraska	W 74–46	17–10 (8–6)	Pinnacle Bank Arena (15,933); Lincoln, NE
Feb 25; 8:00 pm, BTN		Illinois	W 68–60	18–10 (9–6)	Carver–Hawkeye Arena (14,831); Iowa City, IA
Feb 28; 5:00 pm, ESPNU		at Penn State	W 81–77 ^{OT}	19–10 (10–6)	Bryce Jordan Center (9,894); University Park, PA
Mar 3; 6:00 pm, ESPN		at Indiana	W 77–63	20–10 (11–6)	Assembly Hall (17,472); Bloomington, IN
Mar 7; 11:00 am, BTN		Northwestern	W 69–52	21–10 (12–6)	Carver–Hawkeye Arena (15,400); Iowa City, IA
Big Ten tournament
Mar 12; 1:30 pm, BTN		vs. Penn State; Second round	L 58–67	21–11	United Center (16,028); Chicago, IL
NCAA tournament
Mar 20*; 6:20 pm, TNT	(7 S)	vs. (10 S) Davidson; Second round	W 83–52	22–11	KeyArena (14,852); Seattle, WA
Mar 22*; 6:10 pm, TBS	(7 S)	vs. (2 S) No. 7 Gonzaga; Third round	L 68–87	22–12	KeyArena (14,901); Seattle, WA
*Non-conference game. ^{#}Rankings from AP Poll. (#) Tournament seedings in parentheses. S=South Region. All times are in Central Time.

- Source: Schedule

== Rankings ==
Ranking movement Legend: ██ Increase in ranking. ██ Decrease in ranking. (RV) Received votes but unranked. (NR) Not ranked.
Poll	Pre	Wk 2	Wk 3	Wk 4	Wk 5	Wk 6	Wk 7	Wk 8	Wk 9	Wk 10	Wk 11	Wk 12	Wk 13	Wk 14	Wk 15	Wk 16	Wk 17	Wk 18	Wk 19	Final
AP	RV	RV	NR	NR	RV	NR	NR	NR	RV	NR	25	NR	NR	RV	NR	NR	NR	RV	RV	N/A
Coaches	25	25	RV	NR	RV	RV	NR	NR	RV	NR	RV	NR	NR	NR	RV	NR	NR	RV	NR	RV

== See also ==
- 2014–15 Iowa Hawkeyes women's basketball team
