= 2014–15 Rutgers Scarlet Knights men's basketball team =

American college basketball season

2014–15 Rutgers Scarlet Knights men's basketball
- Conference: Big Ten Conference
- Record: 10–22 (2–16 Big Ten)
- Head coach: Eddie Jordan (2nd season)
- Assistant coaches: Van Macon; Mike O'Koren; Greg Vetrone
- Home arena: Louis Brown Athletic Center

2014–15 Big Ten Conference men's basketball standings
	Conf.				Overall
Team	W		L	PCT	W		L	PCT
No. 3 Wisconsin †	16	–	2	.889	36	–	4	.900
No. 12 Maryland	14	–	4	.778	28	–	7	.800
No. 23 Michigan State	12	–	6	.667	27	–	12	.692
Iowa	12	–	6	.667	22	–	12	.647
Purdue	12	–	6	.667	21	–	13	.618
Ohio State	11	–	7	.611	24	–	11	.686
Indiana	9	–	9	.500	20	–	14	.588
Illinois	9	–	9	.500	19	–	14	.576
Michigan	8	–	10	.444	16	–	16	.500
Minnesota	6	–	12	.333	18	–	15	.545
Northwestern	6	–	12	.333	15	–	17	.469
Nebraska	5	–	13	.278	13	–	18	.419
Penn State	4	–	14	.222	18	–	16	.529
Rutgers	2	–	16	.111	10	–	22	.313
† 2015 Big Ten tournament winner Rankings from AP poll

The 2014–15 Rutgers Scarlet Knights men's basketball team represented Rutgers University during the 2014–15 NCAA Division I men's basketball season. The Scarlet Knights, led by second year head coach Eddie Jordan, played their home games at the Louis Brown Athletic Center, better known as The RAC, as first year members of the Big Ten Conference.

== Previous season ==
They finished the season 12–21, 5–13 in AAC play to finish in seventh place. They advanced to the quarterfinals of the AAC tournament where they lost to Louisville.

== Preseason ==
=== Departures ===
Name	Number	Pos.	Height	Weight	Year	Hometown	Notes
Jermone Seagears	1	G	6'1"	175	Junior	Silver Spring, MD	Transferred to UNLV
Craig Brown	15	G/F	6'5"	220	Junior	Miami, FL	Transferred to Kent State
Wally Judge	33	F	6'9"	250	RS Senior	Washington, D.C.	Graduated
J.J. Moore	44	F	6'6"	215	Senior	Brentwood, NY	Graduated
D'Von Campbell	55	G	5'11"	178	Junior	Arlington, TX	Transferred

=== Incoming transfers ===
Name	Number	Pos.	Height	Weight	Year	Hometown	Previous School
Bishop Daniels	2	G	6'3"	185	Junior	Raleigh, NC	ASA College

=== 2014 signing class ===
College recruiting information
Name	Hometown	School	Height	Weight	Commit date
Ibrahima Diallo; C	Winston-Salem, NC	Quality Education Academy	6 ft 10 in (2.08 m)	230 lb (100 kg)	Feb 10, 2014
Ibrahima Diallo; C	Recruit ratings: Scout: Rivals: 247Sports: ESPN:				
D.J. Foreman; SF	Spring Valley, NY	Massanutten Military Academy	6 ft 7 in (2.01 m)	200 lb (91 kg)	Jun 20, 2013
D.J. Foreman; SF	Recruit ratings: Scout: Rivals: 247Sports: ESPN:				
Mike Williams; SG	Brooklyn, NY	Bishop Loughlin Memorial High School	6 ft 2 in (1.88 m)	175 lb (79 kg)	Jul 8, 2013
Mike Williams; SG	Recruit ratings: Scout: Rivals: 247Sports: ESPN:				
Ryan Johnson; SG	Greensboro, NC	New Hope Christian Academy	6 ft 5 in (1.96 m)	175 lb (79 kg)	Apr 28, 2014
Ryan Johnson; SG	Recruit ratings: Scout: Rivals: ESPN:				
Overall recruit ranking:
Note: In many cases, Scout, Rivals, 247Sports, On3, and ESPN may conflict in their listings of height and weight.; In these cases, the average was taken. ESPN grades are on a 100-point scale.; Sources: "2014 Team Ranking". Rivals.

== Roster ==
2014–15 Rutgers Scarlet Knights men's basketball team
Players
Coaches

Pos.	#	Name	Height	Weight	Year	Previous school	Hometown
F	0	Malick Kone	6 ft 5 in (1.96 m)	200 lb (91 kg)	Sr	Blue Ridge School	Conakry, Guinea
G	2	Bishop Daniels	6 ft 3 in (1.91 m)	185 lb (84 kg)	Jr	Word of God; ASA College	Raleigh, NC
G/F	3	Kervin Okoro	6 ft 5 in (1.96 m)	215 lb (98 kg)	Jr	St. Raymond's; Iowa State	Bronx, NY
G	4	Myles Mack	5 ft 10 in (1.78 m)	175 lb (79 kg)	Sr	St. Anthony	Paterson, NJ
G	5	Mike Williams	6 ft 2 in (1.88 m)	190 lb (86 kg)	Fr	Bishop Loughlin	Brooklyn, NY
F	10	Junior Etou	6 ft 7 in (2.01 m)	230 lb (104 kg)	So	Bishop O'Connell	Republic of the Congo
F/C	11	Kadeem Jack	6 ft 9 in (2.06 m)	235 lb (107 kg)	RS Sr	Rice	Queens, NY
G/F	13	Ryan Johnson	6 ft 6 in (1.98 m)	190 lb (86 kg)	Fr	New Hope Christian Academy	Greensboro, NC
G	15	Jake Dadika (W)	5 ft 11 in (1.8 m)	160 lb (73 kg)	Fr	Spotswood	Milltown, NJ
F	21	Stephen Zurich (W)	6 ft 5 in (1.96 m)	205 lb (93 kg)	Jr	Pascack Hills	Montvale, NJ
F	22	D.J. Foreman	6 ft 8 in (2.03 m)	230 lb (104 kg)	Fr	Massanutten Military Acad.	Spring Valley, NY
G	23	Jalen Hyde (W)	5 ft 8 in (1.73 m)	165 lb (75 kg)	Jr	Franklin	Somerset, NJ
F/C	32	Ibrahima Diallo	6 ft 10 in (2.08 m)	240 lb (109 kg)	Fr	Quality Education Academy	Dakar, Senegal
G	33	Khalil Batie (W)	5 ft 10 in (1.78 m)	165 lb (75 kg)	So	Trenton Catholic Acad.	Willingboro, NJ
F/C	35	Greg Lewis	6 ft 9 in (2.06 m)	245 lb (111 kg)	Jr	St. Frances Academy	Baltimore, MD
C	40	Shaquille Doorson (W)	6 ft 11 in (2.11 m)	275 lb (125 kg)	Fr	Canarias Basketball Academy	Netherlands

Head coach

- Eddie Jordan (Rutgers)

Assistant coach(es)

- Van Macon (Southampton)
- Mike O'Koren (North Carolina)
- Greg Vetrone (Long Island)

Legend

- (C) Team captain
- (S) Suspended
- (I) Ineligible
- (W) Walk-on
- Injured
- Current redshirt

Roster

== Schedule ==
Date time, TV	Rank^{#}	Opponent^{#}	Result	Record	Site (attendance) city, state
Exhibition
Nov 8*; 2:00 pm		Baruch College	W 86–42		The RAC (1,239); Piscataway, NJ
Non-conference regular season
Nov 16*; 7:00 pm, BTN		George Washington	L 53–70	0–1	The RAC (5,824); Piscataway, NJ
Nov 19*; 7:30 pm		Fairleigh Dickinson	W 61–44	1–1	The RAC (4,102); Piscataway, NJ
Nov 23*; 5:00 pm		St. Francis Brooklyn; Barclays Center Classic	W 76–73	2–1	The RAC (4,117); Piscataway, NJ
Nov 25*; 7:00 pm, BTN		Saint Peter's; Barclays Center Classic	L 50–68	2–2	The RAC (3,913); Piscataway, NJ
Nov 28*; 7:00 pm, NBCSN		vs. Vanderbilt; Barclays Center Classic semifinals	W 68–65	3–2	Barclays Center (4,118); Brooklyn, NY
Nov 29*; 9:30 pm, NBCSN		vs. No. 8 Virginia; Barclays Center Classic championship	L 26–45	3–3	Barclays Center (4,105); Brooklyn, NY
Dec 1*; 7:00 pm, ESPNU		at Clemson; ACC–Big Ten Challenge	W 69–64	4–3	Littlejohn Coliseum (6,285); Clemson, SC
Dec 6*; 12:00 pm, FSN		at Seton Hall; Rivalry	L 54–81	4–4	Prudential Center (8,710); Newark, NJ
Dec 9*; 7:00 pm, BTN		New Hampshire	W 60–56	5–4	The RAC (3,967); Piscataway, NJ
Dec 14*; 4:00 pm		vs. Manhattan; Madison Square Garden Holiday Festival	W 63–55	6–4	Madison Square Garden (8,074); New York City, NY
Dec 20*; 2:00 pm		Saint Francis (PA)	L 68–73	6–5	The RAC (4,977); Piscataway, NJ
Dec 20*; 7:00 pm, BTN		Sacred Heart	W 79–54	7–5	The RAC (3,903); Piscataway, NJ
Dec 28*; 3:00 pm		at Monmouth	W 59–58	8–5	Multipurpose Activity Center (3,911); West Long Branch, NJ
Big Ten regular season
Dec 30; 12:00 pm, ESPNU		Northwestern	L 47–51	8–6 (0–1)	The RAC (5,651); Piscataway, NJ
Jan 3; 7:30 pm, ESPN2		Penn State	W 50–46	9–6 (1–1)	The RAC (7,158); Piscataway, NJ
Jan 8; 9:00 pm, ESPNU		at Nebraska	L 49–65	9–7 (1–2)	Pinnacle Bank Arena (14,857); Lincoln, NE
Jan 11; 6:00 pm, BTN		No. 4 Wisconsin	W 67–62	10–7 (2–2)	The RAC (6,987); Piscataway, NJ
Jan 14; 7:00 pm, BTN		at No. 14 Maryland	L 65–73	10–8 (2–3)	Xfinity Center (12,419); College Park, MD
Jan 17; 12:00 pm, BTN		at Minnesota	L 80–89	10–9 (2–4)	Williams Arena (12,461); Minneapolis, MN
Jan 20; 6:30 pm, BTN		Michigan	L 50–54	10–10 (2–5)	The RAC (7,365); Piscataway, NJ
Jan 24; 12:00 pm, ESPNU		at Penn State	L 51–79	10–11 (2–6)	Bryce Jordan Center (8,281); University Park, PA
Jan 29; 6:00 pm, BTN		Michigan State	L 51–71	10–12 (2–7)	The RAC (6,088); Piscataway, NJ
Jan 31; 3:15 pm, BTN		at No. 22 Indiana	L 64–72	10–13 (2–8)	Assembly Hall (17,472); Blommington, IN
Feb 3; 9:00 pm, BTN		at Illinois	L 54–66	10–14 (2–9)	State Farm Center (12,838); Champaign, IL
Feb 8; 5:30 pm, BTN		No. 20 Ohio State	L 60–79	10–15 (2–10)	The RAC (8,003); Piscataway, NJ
Feb 12; 7:00 pm, ESPNU		Purdue	L 51–61	10–16 (2–11)	The RAC (5,805); Piscataway, NJ
Feb 19; 7:00 pm, ESPNU		at Iowa	L 47–81	10–17 (2–12)	Carver–Hawkeye Arena (12,594); Iowa City, IA
Feb 22; 2:15 pm, BTN		Indiana	L 54–84	10–18 (2–13)	The RAC (7,402); Piscataway, NJ
Feb 26; 9:00 pm, ESPNU		at Purdue	L 85–92	10–19 (2–14)	Mackey Arena (11,895); West Lafayette, IN
Mar 3; 7:00 pm, BTN		No. 10 Maryland	L 50–60	10–20 (2–15)	The RAC (7,053); Piscataway, NJ
Mar 7; 2:15 pm, BTN		at Michigan	L 69–79	10–21 (2–16)	Crisler Center (12,357); Ann Arbor, MI
Big Ten Conference tournament
Mar 11; 7:00 pm, BTN		vs. Minnesota; First round	L 68–80	10–22	United Center (16,098); Chicago, IL
*Non-conference game. ^{#}Rankings from AP Poll. (#) Tournament seedings in parentheses. All times are in Eastern Time.

== See also ==
- 2014–15 Rutgers Scarlet Knights women's basketball team
