= 2014–15 Minnesota Golden Gophers men's basketball team =

American college basketball season

2014–15 Minnesota Golden Gophers men's basketball
- Conference: Big Ten Conference
- Record: 18–15 (6–12 Big Ten)
- Head coach: Richard Pitino
- Assistant coaches: Dan McHale; Kimani Young; Ben Johnson
- Home arena: Williams Arena

2014–15 Big Ten Conference men's basketball standings
| | Conf. | | | | Overall |
| Team | W | | L | PCT | W | | L | PCT |
|---|---|---|---|---|---|---|---|---|
| No. 3 Wisconsin † | 16 | – | 2 | .889 | 36 | – | 4 | .900 |
| No. 12 Maryland | 14 | – | 4 | .778 | 28 | – | 7 | .800 |
| No. 23 Michigan State | 12 | – | 6 | .667 | 27 | – | 12 | .692 |
| Iowa | 12 | – | 6 | .667 | 22 | – | 12 | .647 |
| Purdue | 12 | – | 6 | .667 | 21 | – | 13 | .618 |
| Ohio State | 11 | – | 7 | .611 | 24 | – | 11 | .686 |
| Indiana | 9 | – | 9 | .500 | 20 | – | 14 | .588 |
| Illinois | 9 | – | 9 | .500 | 19 | – | 14 | .576 |
| Michigan | 8 | – | 10 | .444 | 16 | – | 16 | .500 |
| Minnesota | 6 | – | 12 | .333 | 18 | – | 15 | .545 |
| Northwestern | 6 | – | 12 | .333 | 15 | – | 17 | .469 |
| Nebraska | 5 | – | 13 | .278 | 13 | – | 18 | .419 |
| Penn State | 4 | – | 14 | .222 | 18 | – | 16 | .529 |
| Rutgers | 2 | – | 16 | .111 | 10 | – | 22 | .313 |
† 2015 Big Ten tournament winner Rankings from AP poll

The 2014–15 Minnesota Golden Gophers men's basketball team represented the University of Minnesota in the 2014-15 college basketball season. Led by second-year head coach Richard Pitino, the Golden Gophers, members of the Big Ten Conference, played their home games at Williams Arena in Minneapolis, Minnesota.

== Previous season ==
The Golden Gophers finished the season 25–13, 8–10 in Big Ten play to finish in seventh place. They advanced to the quarterfinals of the Big Ten tournament, where they lost to Wisconsin. They were invited to the National Invitation Tournament, where they defeated High Point, Saint Mary's, Southern Miss, Florida State and SMU to be the 2014 NIT Champions.

== Departures ==
| Name | Number | Pos. | Height | Weight | Year | Hometown | Reason for departure |
|---|---|---|---|---|---|---|---|
| Wally Ellenson | 3 | G | 6'6" | 210 | Sophomore | Rice Lake, WI | Transferred |
| Oto Osenieks | 10 | F | 6'8" | 220 | RS junior | Riga, Latvia | Graduated |
| Maverick Ahanmisi | 13 | G | 6'2" | 190 | Senior | Santa Clarita, CA | Graduated |
| Austin Hollins | 20 | G | 6'4" | 190 | Senior | Germantown, TN | Graduated |
| Malik Smith | 30 | G | 6'2" | 200 | Senior | Boston, MA | Graduated |

== Incoming recruits ==
College recruiting
| Name | Hometown | School | Height | Weight | Commit date |
|---|---|---|---|---|---|
| Josh Martin; PF | Bothell, WA | Bothell High School | 6 ft 8 in (2.03 m) | 218 lb (99 kg) | Sep 30, 2013 |
| Josh Martin; PF | Recruit ratings: Scout: Rivals: 247Sports: ESPN: | | | | |
| Nate Mason; PG | Decatur, GA | Arlington Country Day School | 6 ft 1 in (1.85 m) | 171 lb (78 kg) | Oct 25, 2013 |
| Nate Mason; PG | Recruit ratings: Scout: Rivals: 247Sports: ESPN: | | | | |
| Carlos Morris; SF | Apalachicola, FL | Chipola College (JC) | 6 ft 5 in (1.96 m) | 175 lb (79 kg) | Oct 29, 2013 |
| Carlos Morris; SF | Recruit ratings: Scout: Rivals: 247Sports: ESPN: | | | | |
| Gaston Diedhiou; PF | Senegal | Canarias Basketball Academy | 6 ft 9 in (2.06 m) | 224 lb (102 kg) | Apr 11, 2014 |
| Gaston Diedhiou; PF | Recruit ratings: Scout: Rivals: 247Sports: ESPN: | | | | |
| Bakary Konate; C | Mali | Sunrise Christian Academy | 6 ft 11 in (2.11 m) | 228 lb (103 kg) | Apr 23, 2014 |
| Bakary Konate; C | Recruit ratings: Scout: Rivals: 247Sports: ESPN: | | | | |
Overall recruit ranking:
Note: In many cases, Scout, Rivals, 247Sports, On3, and ESPN may conflict in their listings of height and weight.; In these cases, the average was taken. ESPN grades are on a 100-point scale.; Sources: "2014 Minnesota Signees". ESPN.; "2014 Team Ranking". Rivals.

== Roster ==
2014–15 Minnesota Golden Gophers men's basketball team
Players
Coaches

| Pos. | # | Name | Height | Weight | Year | Previous school | Hometown |
|---|---|---|---|---|---|---|---|
| G | 1 | Andre Hollins | 6 ft 2 in (1.88 m) | 195 lb (88 kg) | Sr | White Station HS | Memphis, TN |
| G | 2 | Nate Mason | 6 ft 1 in (1.85 m) | 185 lb (84 kg) | Fr | Arlington Country Day School | Decatur, GA |
| G | 4 | Deandre Mathieu | 5 ft 9 in (1.75 m) | 170 lb (77 kg) | Sr | Central Arizona College | Knoxville, TN |
| G | 5 | Daquein McNeil (S) | 6 ft 3 in (1.91 m) | 195 lb (88 kg) | So | Vermont Acad. | Baltimore, MD |
| G | 11 | Carlos Morris | 6 ft 5 in (1.96 m) | 180 lb (82 kg) | Jr | Chipola College (JC) | Apalachicola, FL |
| G | 12 | Kendal Shell (W) | 6 ft 0 in (1.83 m) | 185 lb (84 kg) | Sr | Webster Groves HS | St. Louis, MO |
| F | 15 | Maurice Walker | 6 ft 10 in (2.08 m) | 250 lb (113 kg) | RS Sr | Brewster Academy | Scarborough, ON |
| C | 21 | Bakary Konate | 6 ft 11 in (2.11 m) | 230 lb (104 kg) | Fr | Sunrise Christian Academy | Bamako, Mali |
| G | 22 | Darin Haugh (W) | 5 ft 10 in (1.78 m) | 170 lb (77 kg) | Jr | Bethany Lutheran | Prior Lake, MN |
| F | 23 | Charles Buggs | 6 ft 9 in (2.06 m) | 220 lb (100 kg) | RS So | Hargrave Military Acad. | Arlington, TX |
| F | 24 | Joey King | 6 ft 9 in (2.06 m) | 235 lb (107 kg) | Jr | Drake | Eagan, MN |
| G | 25 | Mike Lukashewich (W) | 6 ft 3 in (1.91 m) | 180 lb (82 kg) | Fr | Appleton North HS | Appleton, WI |
| F | 41 | Gaston Diedhiou | 6 ft 9 in (2.06 m) | 230 lb (104 kg) | Fr | Canarias Basketball Academy | Dakar, Senegal |
| C | 55 | Elliott Eliason | 6 ft 11 in (2.11 m) | 245 lb (111 kg) | RS Sr | Chadron HS | Chadron, NE |

Head coach

- Richard Pitino (Providence)

Assistant coach(es)

- Ben Johnson (Minnesota)
- Dan McHale (Kentucky)
- Kimani Young (UTEP)

Legend

- (C) Team captain
- (S) Suspended
- (I) Ineligible
- (W) Walk-on
- Injured
- Current redshirt

Roster

== Schedule and results ==
| Date time, TV | Rank^{#} | Opponent^{#} | Result | Record | Site (attendance) city, state |
Exhibition
| Nov 6*; 7:00 pm | | Minnesota–Duluth | W 95–68 | – | Williams Arena (11,440); Minneapolis, MN |
Regular season
| Nov 14*; 6:00 pm, ESPN | | vs. No. 8 Louisville; Armed Forces Classic | L 68–81 | 0–1 | CGAS Borinquen (1,693); Aguadilla, PR |
| Nov 18*; 7:00 pm, ESPN3 | | Western Kentucky; NIT Season Tip-Off | W 76–54 | 1–1 | Williams Arena (10,763); Minneapolis, MN |
| Nov 20*; 7:00 pm | | Franklin Pierce; NIT Season Tip-Off | W 109–57 | 2–1 | Williams Arena (9,562); Minneapolis, MN |
| Nov 22*; 7:30 pm | | UMBC | W 69–51 | 3–1 | Williams Arena (11,212); Minneapolis, MN |
| Nov 26*; 6:00 pm, ESPNU | | vs. St. John's; NIT Season Tip-Off semifinals | L 61–70 | 3–2 | Madison Square Garden (5,128); New York City, NY |
| Nov 28*; 3:30 pm, ESPNU | | vs. Georgia; NIT Season Tip-Off 3rd place game | W 66–62 | 4–2 | Madison Square Garden (5,548); New York City, NY |
| Dec 2*; 6:00 pm, ESPNU | | at Wake Forest; ACC–Big Ten Challenge | W 84–69 | 5–2 | LJVM Coliseum (8,112); Winston-Salem, NC |
| Dec 5*; 6:00 pm, ESPN3 | | Western Carolina | W 84–64 | 6–2 | Williams Arena (11,026); Minneapolis, MN |
| Dec 8*; 8:00 pm, ESPNU | | North Dakota | W 92–56 | 7–2 | Williams Arena (11,185); Minneapolis, MN |
| Dec 10*; 7:00 pm, ESPN3 | | Southern | W 85–57 | 8–2 | Williams Arena (11,409); Minneapolis, MN |
| Dec 19*; 7:00 pm, BTN | | Seattle | W 92–57 | 9–2 | Williams Arena (12,121); Minneapolis, MN |
| Dec 22*; 7:00 pm, ESPN3 | | Furman | W 86–76 | 10–2 | Williams Arena (12,287); Minneapolis, MN |
| Dec 27*; 12:00 pm, BTN | | UNC Wilmington | W 108–82 | 11–2 | Williams Arena (12,711); Minneapolis, MN |
Big Ten regular season
| Dec 31; 2:15 pm, BTN | | at Purdue | L 68–72 | 11–3 (0–1) | Mackey Arena (10,018); West Lafayette, IN |
| Jan 3; 11:00 am, BTN | | at No. 12 Maryland | L 58–70 | 11–4 (0–2) | Xfinity Center (15,788); College Park, MD |
| Jan 6; 8:00 pm, ESPN | | No. 22 Ohio State | L 72–74 ^{OT} | 11–5 (0–3) | Williams Arena (13,138); Minneapolis, MN |
| Jan 10; 12:00 pm, ESPNU | | at Michigan | L 57–62 | 11–6 (0–4) | Crisler Center (12,707); Ann Arbor, MI |
| Jan 13; 8:00 pm, BTN | | Iowa | L 75–77 | 11–7 (0–5) | Williams Arena (12,401); Minneapolis, MN |
| Jan 17; 11:00 am, BTN | | Rutgers | W 89–80 | 12–7 (1–5) | Williams Arena (12,461); Minneapolis, MN |
| Jan 20; 7:30 pm, BTN | | at Nebraska | L 49–52 | 12–8 (1–6) | Pinnacle Bank Arena (15,606); Lincoln, NE |
| Jan 24; 1:15 pm, BTN | | Illinois | W 79–71 | 13–8 (2–6) | Williams Arena (13,421); Minneapolis, MN |
| Jan 28; 6:00 pm, BTN | | at Penn State | L 58–63 | 13–9 (2–7) | Bryce Jordan Center (6,100); University Park, PA |
| Jan 31; 5:00 pm, BTN | | Nebraska | W 60–42 | 14–9 (3–7) | Williams Arena (13,253); Minneapolis, MN |
| Feb 7; 2:00 pm, BTN | | Purdue | W 62–58 | 15–9 (4–7) | Williams Arena (13,041); Minneapolis, MN |
| Feb 12; 6:00 pm, BTN | | at Iowa | W 64–59 | 16–9 (5–7) | Carver–Hawkeye Arena (13,756); Iowa City, IA |
| Feb 15; 6:30 pm, BTN | | at Indiana | L 71–90 | 16–10 (5–8) | Assembly Hall (17,472); Blommington, IN |
| Feb 18; 8:00 pm, BTN | | Northwestern | L 66–72 | 16–11 (5–9) | Williams Arena (12,361); Minneapolis, MN |
| Feb 21; 11:00 am, ESPN | | at No. 5 Wisconsin | L 53–63 | 16–12 (5–10) | Kohl Center (17,279); Madison, WI |
| Feb 26; 6:00 pm, BTN | | at Michigan State | W 96–90 ^{OT} | 17–12 (6–10) | Breslin Center (14,797); East Lansing, MI |
| Mar 5; 6:00 pm, ESPN | | No. 6 Wisconsin | L 63–76 | 17–13 (6–11) | Williams Arena (14,625); Minneapolis, MN |
| Mar 8; 12:00 pm, BTN | | Penn State | L 76–79 | 17–14 (6–12) | Williams Arena (12,412); Minneapolis, MN |
Big Ten tournament
| Mar 11; 6:00 pm, BTN | (11) | vs. (14) Rutgers; First round | W 80–68 | 18–14 | United Center (16,098); Chicago, IL |
| Mar 12; 8:00 pm, ESPN2 | (11) | vs. (6) Ohio State; Second round | L 73–79 | 18–15 | United Center (16,549); Chicago, IL |
*Non-conference game. ^{#}Rankings from AP Poll. (#) Tournament seedings in parentheses. All times are in Central Time.
