= Jarrod Uthoff =

American basketball player (born 1993)

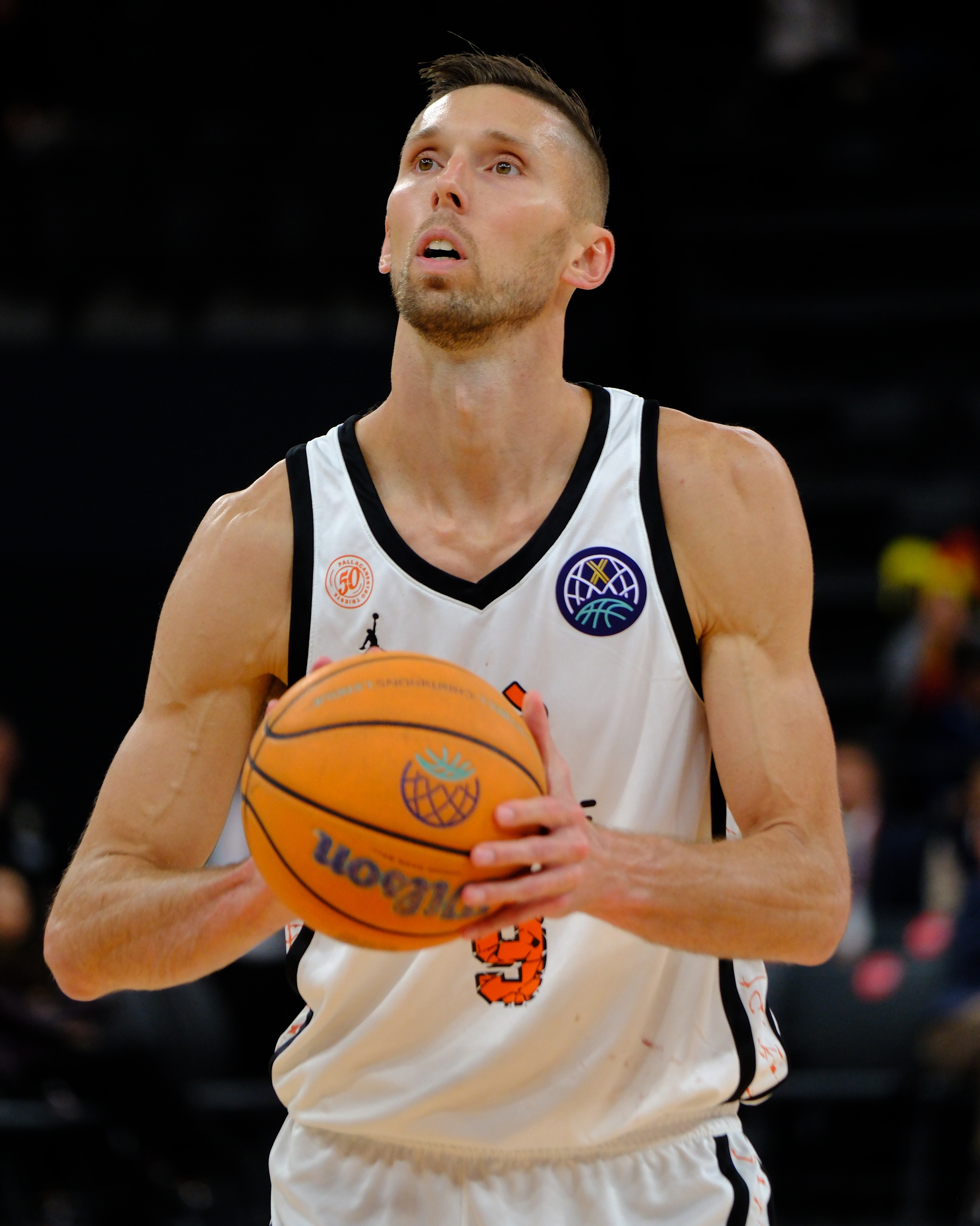
- Uthoff with Pallacanestro Trieste in 2025

No. 20 – Maroussi
- Position: Power forward
- League: GBL

Personal information
- Born: May 19, 1993 (age 33) Cedar Rapids, Iowa, U.S.
- Listed height: 6 ft 9 in (2.06 m)
- Listed weight: 220 lb (100 kg)

Career information
- High school: Jefferson (Cedar Rapids, Iowa)
- College: Wisconsin (2011–2012); Iowa (2013–2016)
- NBA draft: 2016: undrafted
- Playing career: 2016–present

Career history
- 2016–2017: Raptors 905
- 2017: Fort Wayne Mad Ants
- 2017: Dallas Mavericks
- 2017: →Texas Legends
- 2017–2018: Fort Wayne Mad Ants
- 2018–2019: Zenit Saint Petersburg
- 2019–2020: Memphis Hustle
- 2020: Memphis Grizzlies
- 2020: Memphis Hustle
- 2020: Washington Wizards
- 2021: Erie BayHawks
- 2021–2022: SeaHorses Mikawa
- 2022–2023: Kyoto Hannaryz
- 2023–2024: Yokohama B-Corsairs
- 2024–2026: Pallacanestro Trieste
- 2026: Petkim Spor
- 2026–present: Maroussi

Career highlights
- All-NBA G League First Team (2020); All-NBA G League Third Team (2021); Consensus second-team All-American (2016); First-team All-Big Ten (2016); Third-team All-Big Ten (2015); Big Ten All-Defensive team (2016); Academic All-American of the Year (2016); Iowa Mr. Basketball (2011)
- Stats at NBA.com
- Stats at Basketball Reference

Jarrod Reed Uthoff (born May 19, 1993) is an American professional basketball player for Maroussi of the Greek Basketball League (GBL). He played college basketball for the Iowa Hawkeyes, where he earned All-America honors as a senior.

== High school career ==
Uthoff starred at Jefferson High School in Cedar Rapids, earning Iowa Mr. Basketball honors as the top high school player in the state as a senior in 2011.

== College career ==
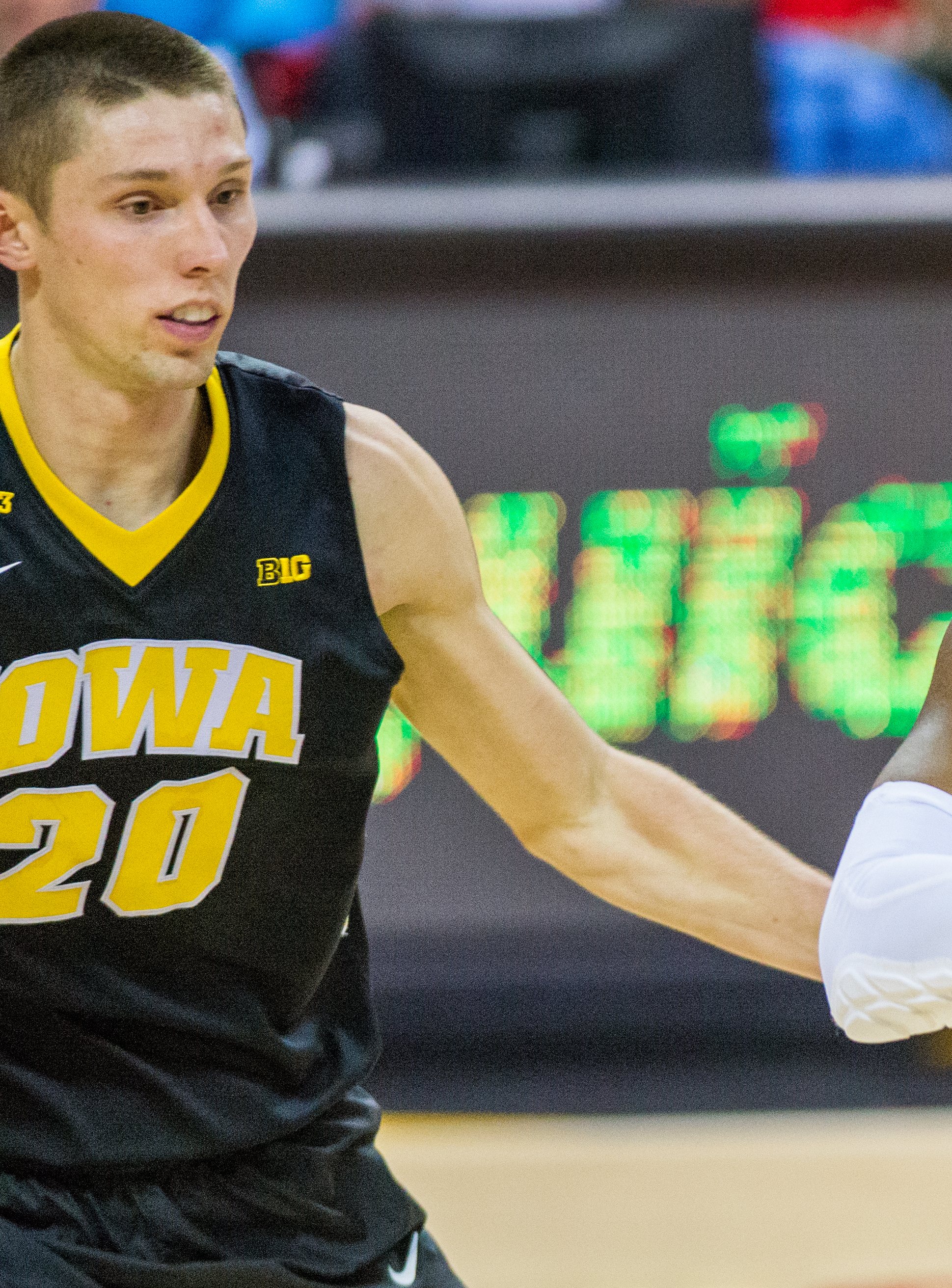
Uthoff during his time with the Iowa Hawkeyes.

Uthoff committed to the University of Wisconsin, where he sat out the 2011–12 season as a redshirt. He decided to transfer in the off-season. His case received national press as Wisconsin coach Bo Ryan originally barred the player from transferring to 26 different schools. After heavy public scrutiny, Ryan reduced his restrictions to only cover the Big Ten Conference. Uthoff ultimately chose Iowa, a Big Ten school, opting to pay his own way in the 2012–13 season as he sat out the year as a transfer per NCAA regulations.

Uthoff finally took the court for the Hawkeyes in 2013–14 season as a redshirt sophomore. He was a key player off the bench for the team, averaging 7.6 points and 4.6 rebounds per game. With graduation losses the following season, he entered the starting lineup. As a junior, he averaged 12.4 points and 6.4 rebounds per game as a complement to senior forward Aaron White. At the close of the year, Uthoff was named third-team All-Big Ten.

Leading up to his senior season, Uthoff was named to the preseason All-Big Ten team. With the departure of Aaron White, Uthoff stepped into the role of the Hawkeyes' top scoring option. He was named to the 35-man midseason watchlist for the Naismith Trophy on February 11. Over his three-year career, he averaged 13.0 points, 5.8 rebounds and 1.7 blocks in 100 games. He finished his collegiate career ranked 19th all-time in Hawkeyes scoring (1,298 points), fourth in blocked shots (177) and 10th in three-pointers made (137).

== Professional career ==
=== Raptors 905 (2016–2017) ===
After going undrafted in the 2016 NBA draft, Uthoff joined the Sacramento Kings for the 2016 NBA Summer League. On August 2, 2016, he signed with the Toronto Raptors, but was waived on October 22 after appearing in one preseason game. On October 30, he was acquired by Raptors 905 of the NBA Development League as an affiliate player of the Raptors. On January 27, 2017, he was traded to the Fort Wayne Mad Ants.

=== Dallas Mavericks (2017) ===
On March 9, 2017, Uthoff signed a 10-day contract with the Dallas Mavericks. He made his NBA debut the following day in the Mavericks' 105–96 win over the Brooklyn Nets, playing two minutes off the bench. On March 19, 2017, he signed a second 10-day contract with the Mavericks. During his first 20 days as a Maverick, he received two assignments to the Texas Legends. On March 29, 2017, he signed a multi-year contract with the Mavericks.

On June 29, 2017, Uthoff was traded to the Houston Rockets in exchange for cash considerations. On July 31, 2017, Uthoff was waived by the Rockets.

=== Fort Wayne Mad Ants (2017–2018) ===
In the 2017–18 season with the Fort Wayne Mad Ants, Uthoff averaged 16.5 points, 8.4 rebounds, and 2.5 assists per game.

=== Zenit Saint Petersburg (2018–2019) ===
On July 19, 2018, Uthoff signed with Zenit Saint Petersburg of the VTB United League where he played 16 games and averaged 7.2 points, 3.4 rebounds and 0.6 assists in 16.3 minutes.

=== Memphis Hustle (2019–2020) ===
On October 16, 2019, Uthoff was signed by the Memphis Grizzlies of the NBA and waived the next day. He was added to the roster of the Grizzlies’ G League affiliate, the Memphis Hustle. On December 31, Uthoff tallied 30 points, nine rebounds, three assists, two steals and one block in a 128–113 win over the Rio Grande Valley Vipers. Uthoff was named Midseason All-NBA G League for the Western Conference.

=== Memphis Grizzlies (2020) ===
On February 27, 2020, Uthoff signed a 10-day contract with the Memphis Grizzlies. His contract expired on March 7, 2020. He appeared in four games. The G League season was canceled, due to the COVID-19 pandemic, before Uthoff could rejoin the Hustle.

=== Washington Wizards (2020) ===
On July 17, 2020, at the beginning of the "Orlando Bubble" phase of the pandemic-interrupted 2019-2020 NBA season, the Washington Wizards signed Uthoff to a "substitution contract." He filled a roster sport vacated by Gary Payton II, who had tested positive for COVID-19. Uthoff remained with the team until the end of the season, appearing in three games. The Wizards did not qualify for the playoffs.

=== Erie BayHawks (2021) ===
On December 2, 2020, Uthoff signed with the New Orleans Pelicans. On December 19, 2020, Uthoff was waived by the Pelicans at the end of training camp.

Uthoff's G League rights were still held by the Memphis Grizzlies' affiliate, the Memphis Hustle, when he was waived by the Pelicans. Uthoff was unable to join the Pelicans' affiliate Erie BayHawks until the BayHawks made a deal to trade the 2nd overall draft pick in the 2021 NBA G League draft to the Hustle. The draft was held on January 11, 2021, and Memphis used the pick to acquire Baylor forward Freddie Gillespie.

The BayHawks were one of 18 teams who played the 2021 G League season in a "bubble" at Walt Disney World, beginning in February. On January 12, 2021, Uthoff was included in the roster of the Erie BayHawks. He played in and started 14 of the BayHawks' 15 games, averaging 8.8 rebounds and 14.9 points per game. The Bayhawks went 11–4 and made the playoffs, but got knocked out in the first round. Uthoff was named a Third Team G League All-Star at the end of the season.

=== SeaHorses Mikawa (2021–2022) ===
On June 23, 2021, Uthoff signed with SeaHorses Mikawa of the B.League. On February 19, 2022, Uthoff was traded from the Birmingham Squadron to the Austin Spurs, but he remained in Japan, continuing to play for Mikawa.

=== Pallacanestro Trieste (2024–2026) ===
On July 27, 2024, he signed with Pallacanestro Trieste of the Italian Lega Basket Serie A (LBA).

=== Petkim Spor (2026) ===
On July 3, 2026, he signed with Petkim Spor of the Basketbol Süper Ligi (BSL). He was released by the team on November 8, 2026, after appearing in six league games.

=== Maroussi (2026–present) ===
On November 14, 2026, he signed with Maroussi of the Greek Basketball League (GBL).

== Career statistics ==
Legend
GP	Games played	GS	Games started	MPG	Minutes per game
FG%	Field goal percentage	3P%	3-point field goal percentage	FT%	Free throw percentage
RPG	Rebounds per game	APG	Assists per game	SPG	Steals per game
BPG	Blocks per game	PPG	Points per game	**Bold**	Career high

=== NBA regular season ===
Year	Team	GP	GS	MPG	FG%	3P%	FT%	RPG	APG	SPG	BPG	PPG
2016–17	Dallas	**9**	0	12.8	.421	.333	.714	**2.6**	**1.0**	.2	**.4**	4.4
2019–20	Memphis	4	0	3.5	.143	.000	**1.000**	1.5	.0	**.3**	.0	1.0
2019–20	Washington	3	0	**13.0**	**.545**	**.600**	.-	1.7	.0	.0	.0	**5.0**
Career		16	0	10.5	.411	.333	.778	1.8	.6	.2	.3	3.7

=== College ===
Year	Team	GP	GS	MPG	FG%	3P%	FT%	RPG	APG	SPG	BPG	PPG
2013–14	Iowa	33	0	18.2	**.500**	**.425**	**.817**	4.6	.8	.3	1.1	7.6
2014–15	Iowa	**34**	**34**	30.3	.430	.372	.737	**6.4**	**1.7**	**1.1**	1.6	12.4
2015–16	Iowa	33	33	**30.8**	.448	.382	.813	6.3	1.1	1.0	**2.6**	**18.9**
Career		100	67	26.5	.450	.383	.795	5.8	1.2	.8	1.8	13.0

== Personal life ==
Uthoff majored in economics at the University of Iowa. His third cousin, Dean Uthoff, played basketball at Iowa State and then went on to play professionally in Australia. An Australian National Basketball League legend, Dean played 13 years in the league for the Nunawading Spectres and then the Sydney Kings. Dean's brother, Ed, also distinguished himself in college ball and was team captain at San Jose State.

Uthoff is married to Jessie Jordan Uthoff, daughter of congressman Jim Jordan.
