= 2014–15 Ohio State Buckeyes men's basketball team =

American college basketball season

2014–15 Ohio State Buckeyes men's basketball

NCAA tournament, round of 32
- Conference: Big Ten Conference
- Record: 24–11 (11–7 Big Ten)
- Head coach: Thad Matta (11th season)
- Assistant coaches: Dave Dickerson; Jeff Boals; Greg Paulus
- Home arena: Value City Arena

2014–15 Big Ten Conference men's basketball standings
	Conf.				Overall
Team	W		L	PCT	W		L	PCT
No. 3 Wisconsin †	16	–	2	.889	36	–	4	.900
No. 12 Maryland	14	–	4	.778	28	–	7	.800
No. 23 Michigan State	12	–	6	.667	27	–	12	.692
Iowa	12	–	6	.667	22	–	12	.647
Purdue	12	–	6	.667	21	–	13	.618
Ohio State	11	–	7	.611	24	–	11	.686
Indiana	9	–	9	.500	20	–	14	.588
Illinois	9	–	9	.500	19	–	14	.576
Michigan	8	–	10	.444	16	–	16	.500
Minnesota	6	–	12	.333	18	–	15	.545
Northwestern	6	–	12	.333	15	–	17	.469
Nebraska	5	–	13	.278	13	–	18	.419
Penn State	4	–	14	.222	18	–	16	.529
Rutgers	2	–	16	.111	10	–	22	.313
† 2015 Big Ten tournament winner Rankings from AP poll

The 2014–15 Ohio State Buckeyes men's basketball team represented Ohio State University in the 2014–15 NCAA Division I men's basketball season. Their head coach was Thad Matta, in his 11th season with the Buckeyes. The team played its home games at Value City Arena in Columbus, Ohio and were members of the Big Ten Conference. They finished the season 24–11, 11–7 in Big Ten play to finish in sixth place. They advanced to the quarterfinals of the Big Ten tournament where they lost to Michigan State. They received an at-large bid to the NCAA tournament where they defeated VCU in the first round before losing in the second round to Arizona.

== Before the season ==
=== Previous season ===
The Buckeye finished the season with 25–10 overall, 10–8 in Big Ten play for a fifth-place finish. They lost in the semifinals of the 2014 Big Ten Conference men's basketball tournament to Michigan. They were invited to the 2014 NCAA Division I men's basketball tournament as a 6th seed in the south region which they were upset by Dayton in the second round 60–59.

=== Departures ===
Name	Number	Pos.	Height	Weight	Year	Hometown	Notes
Aaron Craft	4	G	6'2"	195	Senior	Finday, OH	Graduated/Undrafted in the 2014 NBA draft
LaQuinton Ross	10	F	6'8"	220	Junior	Jackson, MS	Declare for 2014 NBA draft
Lenzelle Smith Jr.	32	G	6'4"	210	Senior	Zion, IL	Graduated
Amedeo Della Valle	33	G	6'5"	190	Sophomore	Alba, Italy	Signed to play professionally in Italy with Pallacanestro Reggiana

=== Incoming transfers ===
Name	Number	Pos.	Height	Weight	Year	Hometown	Previous school
Anthony Lee	31	F	6'9"	230	Senior	Columbia, MD	Transferred from Temple. Will be eligible to play immediately since Lee graduated from Temple.
Trevor Thompson	32	F	6'11"	210	Sophomore	Indianapolis, IN	Transferred from Virginia Tech. Under NCAA transfer rules, Thompson will have to redshirt for the 2014–15 season. Will have two years of remaining eligibility.

=== Recruiting ===
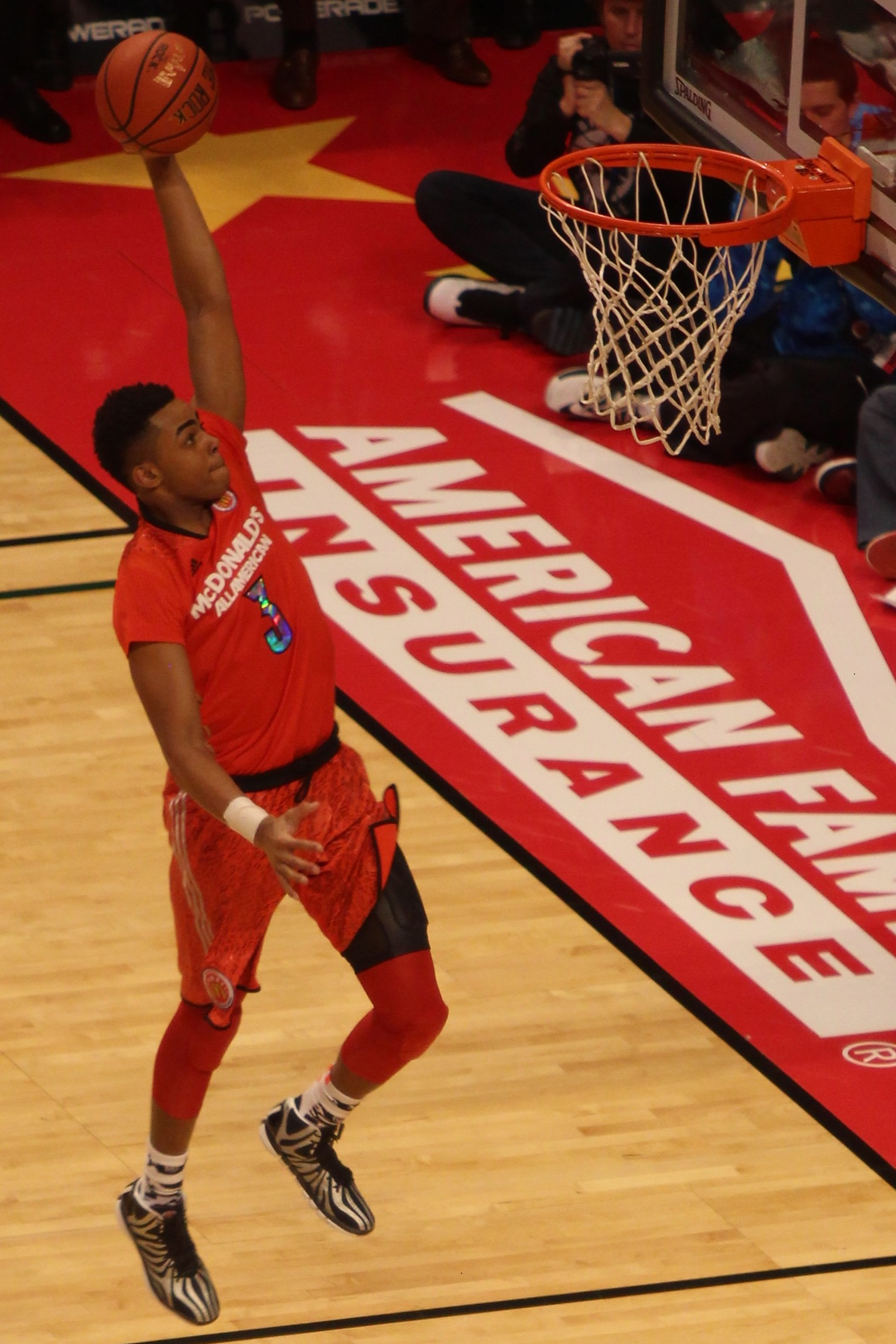
D'Angelo Russell in the 2014 McDonald's All-American Boys Game

College recruiting information
Name	Hometown	School	Height	Weight	Commit date
D'Angelo Russell; SG	Louisville, KY	Montverde Academy	6 ft 4 in (1.93 m)	180 lb (82 kg)	Jun 7, 2013
D'Angelo Russell; SG	Recruit ratings: Scout: Rivals: 247Sports: ESPN:				
Keita Bates-Diop; SF	Bloomington, IL	University High School	6 ft 7 in (2.01 m)	190 lb (86 kg)	Nov 18, 2012
Keita Bates-Diop; SF	Recruit ratings: Scout: Rivals: 247Sports: ESPN:				
Jae'Sean Tate; SF	Pickerington, OH	Pickerington, Ohio	6 ft 5 in (1.96 m)	190 lb (86 kg)	Nov 19, 2012
Jae'Sean Tate; SF	Recruit ratings: Scout: Rivals: 247Sports: ESPN:				
David Bell; C	Garfield Heights, OH	Garfield Heights High School	6 ft 9 in (2.06 m)	200 lb (91 kg)	Feb 11, 2013
David Bell; C	Recruit ratings: Scout: Rivals: 247Sports: ESPN:				
Overall recruit ranking: Scout: NR Rivals: NR ESPN: NR
Note: In many cases, Scout, Rivals, 247Sports, On3, and ESPN may conflict in their listings of height and weight.; In these cases, the average was taken. ESPN grades are on a 100-point scale.; Sources: "2014 Team Ranking". Rivals.

== Roster ==
2014–15 Ohio State Buckeyes men's basketball team
Players
Coaches

Pos.	#	Name	Height	Weight	Year	Hometown
G	0	D'Angelo Russell	6 ft 5 in (1.96 m)	180 lb (82 kg)	Fr	Louisville, Kentucky
F	1	Jae'Sean Tate	6 ft 4 in (1.93 m)	190 lb (86 kg)	Fr	Pickerington, Ohio
F	2	Marc Loving	6 ft 7 in (2.01 m)	215 lb (98 kg)	So	Toledo, Ohio
G	3	Shannon Scott	6 ft 1 in (1.85 m)	185 lb (84 kg)	Sr	Alpharetta, Georgia
C	10	David Bell	6 ft 10 in (2.08 m)	225 lb (102 kg)	Fr	Garfield Heights, Ohio
F	12	Sam Thompson	6 ft 7 in (2.01 m)	200 lb (91 kg)	Sr	Chicago, Illinois
G	15	Kam Williams	6 ft 2 in (1.88 m)	175 lb (79 kg)	RS Fr	Baltimore, Maryland
C	23	Amir Williams	6 ft 11 in (2.11 m)	250 lb (113 kg)	Sr	Birmingham, Michigan
C	31	Anthony Lee	6 ft 9 in (2.06 m)	230 lb (104 kg)	Sr	Columbia, Maryland
C	32	Trevor Thompson (redshirt)	6 ft 11 in (2.11 m)	210 lb (95 kg)	So	Indianapolis, Indiana
F	33	Keita Bates-Diop	6 ft 7 in (2.01 m)	190 lb (86 kg)	Fr	Bloomington, Illinois
F	34	Jake Lorbach	6 ft 7 in (2.01 m)	210 lb (95 kg)	Jr	Elyria, Ohio
C	55	Trey McDonald	6 ft 8 in (2.03 m)	240 lb (109 kg)	Sr	Battle Creek, Michigan

Head coach

- Thad Matta (Butler)

Assistant coach(es)

- Dave Dickerson (Maryland)
- Jeff Boals (Ohio)
- Greg Paulus (Duke)

Legend

- (C) Team captain
- (S) Suspended
- (I) Ineligible
- (W) Walk-on
- Injured
- Current redshirt

Roster

== Schedule ==
Date time, TV	Rank^{#}	Opponent^{#}	Result	Record	Site (attendance) city, state
Exhibition
Nov 9*; 4:00 pm	No. 20	Walsh	W 77–37	–	Value City Arena (13,345); Columbus, OH
Non-conference regular season
Nov 14*; 7:00 pm	No. 20	UMass Lowell	W 92–55	1–0	Value City Arena (13,256); Columbus, OH
Nov 18*; 7:30 pm, ESPN2	No. 20	Marquette	W 74–63	2–0	Value City Arena (13,233); Columbus, OH
Nov 23*; 7:00 pm, BTN	No. 20	Sacred Heart; Buckeye Classic	W 106–48	3–0	Value City Arena (12,941); Columbus, OH
Nov 26*; 7:00 pm, BTN	No. 16	Campbell; Buckeye Classic	W 91–64	4–0	Value City Arena (12,508); Columbus, OH
Nov 28*; 4:00 pm, BTN	No. 16	James Madison; Buckeye Classic	W 73–56	5–0	Value City Arena (14,310); Columbus, OH
Dec 2*; 9:30 pm, ESPN	No. 14	at No. 5 Louisville; ACC–Big Ten Challenge	L 55–64	5–1	KFC Yum! Center (22,784); Louisville, KY
Dec 6*; 4:30 pm, BTN	No. 14	Colgate; Buckeye Classic	W 70–50	6–1	Value City Arena (14,054); Columbus, OH
Dec 10*; 7:00 pm, ESPNU	No. 12	High Point	W 97–43	7–1	Value City Arena (13,012); Columbus, OH
Dec 13*; 1:00 pm, BTN	No. 12	Morehead State	W 87–71	8–1	Value City Arena (14,578); Columbus, OH
Dec 17*; 7:00 pm, BTN	No. 12	North Carolina A&T	W 97–55	9–1	Nationwide Arena (14,585); Columbus, OH
Dec 20*; 3:30 pm, CBS	No. 12	vs. No. 24 North Carolina; CBS Sports Classic	L 74–82	9–2	United Center (19,726); Chicago, IL
Dec 22*; 6:00 pm, BTN	No. 21	Miami (OH)	W 93–55	10–2	Value City Arena (15,018); Columbus, OH
Dec 27*; 7:00 pm, BTN	No. 21	Wright State	W 100–55	11–2	Value City Arena (15,874); Columbus, OH
Big Ten Regular season
Dec 30; 1:00 pm, ESPN2	No. 20	Iowa	L 65–71	11–3 (0–1)	Value City Arena (15,189); Columbus, OH
Jan 3; 3:30 pm, ESPN2	No. 20	Illinois	W 77–61	12–3 (1–1)	Value City Arena (16,028); Columbus, OH
Jan 6; 9:00 pm, ESPN	No. 22	at Minnesota	W 74–72 ^{OT}	13–3 (2–1)	Williams Arena (13,138); Minneapolis, MN
Jan 10; 12:00 pm, ESPN	No. 22	at Indiana	L 66–69	13–4 (2–2)	Assembly Hall (15,563); Bloomington, IN
Jan 13; 7:00 pm, ESPN		Michigan	W 71–52	14–4 (3–2)	Value City Arena (15,548); Columbus, OH
Jan 17; 2:00 pm, ESPN		at Iowa	L 67–76	14–5 (3–3)	Carver–Hawkeye Arena (15,400); Iowa City, IA
Jan 22; 7:00 pm, ESPN		at Northwestern	W 69–67	15–5 (4–3)	Welsh-Ryan Arena (7,117); Evanston, IL
Jan 25; 1:30 pm, CBS		No. 23 Indiana	W 82–70	16–5 (5–3)	Value City Arena (17,322); Columbus, OH
Jan 29; 7:00 pm, ESPN		No. 16 Maryland	W 80–56	17–5 (6–3)	Value City Arena (14,483); Columbus, OH
Feb 4; 6:30 pm, BTN	No. 20	at Purdue	L 58–60	17–6 (6–4)	Mackey Arena (12,087); West Lafayette, IN
Feb 8; 5:30 pm, BTN	No. 20	at Rutgers	W 79–60	18–6 (7–4)	The RAC (8,003); Piscataway, NJ
Feb 11; 7:00 pm, BTN	No. 23	Penn State	W 75–55	19–6 (8–4)	Value City Arena (13,262); Columbus, OH
Feb 14; 12:00 pm, ESPN	No. 23	at Michigan State	L 56–59	19–7 (8–5)	Breslin Center (14,797); East Lansing, MI
Feb 22; 1:00 pm, CBS	No. 24	at Michigan	L 57–64	19–8 (8–6)	Crisler Center (12,618); Ann Arbor, MI
Feb 26; 7:00 pm, ESPN		Nebraska	W 81–57	20–8 (9–6)	Value City Arena (13,712); Columbus, OH
Mar 1; 7:30 pm, BTN		Purdue	W 65–61	21–8 (10–6)	Value City Arena (15,978); Columbus, OH
Mar 4; 6:00 pm, BTN	No. 23	at Penn State	W 77–67	22–8 (11–6)	Bryce Jordan Center (8,745); University Park, PA
Mar 8; 4:30 pm, CBS	No. 23	No. 6 Wisconsin	L 48–72	22–9 (11–7)	Value City Arena (18,077); Columbus, OH
Big Ten tournament
Mar 12; 9:00 pm, ESPN2		vs. Minnesota; Second round	W 79–73	23–9	United Center (16,549); Chicago, IL
Mar 13; 9:00 pm, BTN		vs. Michigan State; Quarterfinals	L 67–76	23–10	United Center (17,230); Chicago, IL
NCAA tournament
Mar 19*; 4:40 pm, TNT	(10 W)	vs. (7 W) No. 25 VCU first round	W 75–72 ^{OT}	24–10	Moda Center (13,616); Portland, OR
Mar 21*; 5:20 pm, CBS	(10 W)	vs. (2 W) No. 5 Arizona second round	L 58–73	24–11	Moda Center (17,370); Portland, OR
*Non-conference game. ^{#}Rankings from AP Poll. (#) Tournament seedings in parentheses. W=West Region. All times are in Eastern Time.

== Rankings ==
Ranking movement Legend: ██ Increase in ranking. ██ Decrease in ranking. (RV) Received votes but unranked. (NR) Not ranked.
Poll	Pre	Wk 2	Wk 3	Wk 4	Wk 5	Wk 6	Wk 7	Wk 8	Wk 9	Wk 10	Wk 11	Wk 12	Wk 13	Wk 14	Wk 15	Wk 16	Wk 17	Wk 18	Wk 19	Final
AP	20	20	16	14	12	12	21	20	22	RV	RV	RV	20	23	24	RV	23	RV	RV	N/A
Coaches	20	20	17	13	12	12	18	18	20	25	RV	RV	20	21	23	RV	25	RV	RV	RV
