= 2015 Big Ten men's basketball tournament =

- Classification: Division I
- Season: 2014–15
- Teams: 14
- Site: United Center; Chicago, Illinois
- Champions: Wisconsin (3rd title)
- Winning coach: Bo Ryan (3rd title)
- MVP: Frank Kaminsky (Wisconsin)
- Attendance: 118,496
- Television: BTN, ESPN/2, CBS

2014–15 Big Ten Conference men's basketball standings
	Conf.				Overall
Team	W		L	PCT	W		L	PCT
No. 3 Wisconsin †	16	–	2	.889	36	–	4	.900
No. 12 Maryland	14	–	4	.778	28	–	7	.800
No. 23 Michigan State	12	–	6	.667	27	–	12	.692
Iowa	12	–	6	.667	22	–	12	.647
Purdue	12	–	6	.667	21	–	13	.618
Ohio State	11	–	7	.611	24	–	11	.686
Indiana	9	–	9	.500	20	–	14	.588
Illinois	9	–	9	.500	19	–	14	.576
Michigan	8	–	10	.444	16	–	16	.500
Minnesota	6	–	12	.333	18	–	15	.545
Northwestern	6	–	12	.333	15	–	17	.469
Nebraska	5	–	13	.278	13	–	18	.419
Penn State	4	–	14	.222	18	–	16	.529
Rutgers	2	–	16	.111	10	–	22	.313
† 2015 Big Ten tournament winner Rankings from AP poll

The 2015 Big Ten men's basketball tournament was held from March 11 through March 15 at United Center in Chicago, Illinois. This was the eighteenth annual Big Ten tournament and was the first tournament to feature 14 teams of the expanded Big Ten to include Maryland and Rutgers. The championship was won by Wisconsin who defeated Michigan State in the championship game. As a result, Wisconsin received the Big Ten's automatic bid to the NCAA tournament. The win marked Wisconsin's third tournament championship and first since 2008.

== Seeds ==
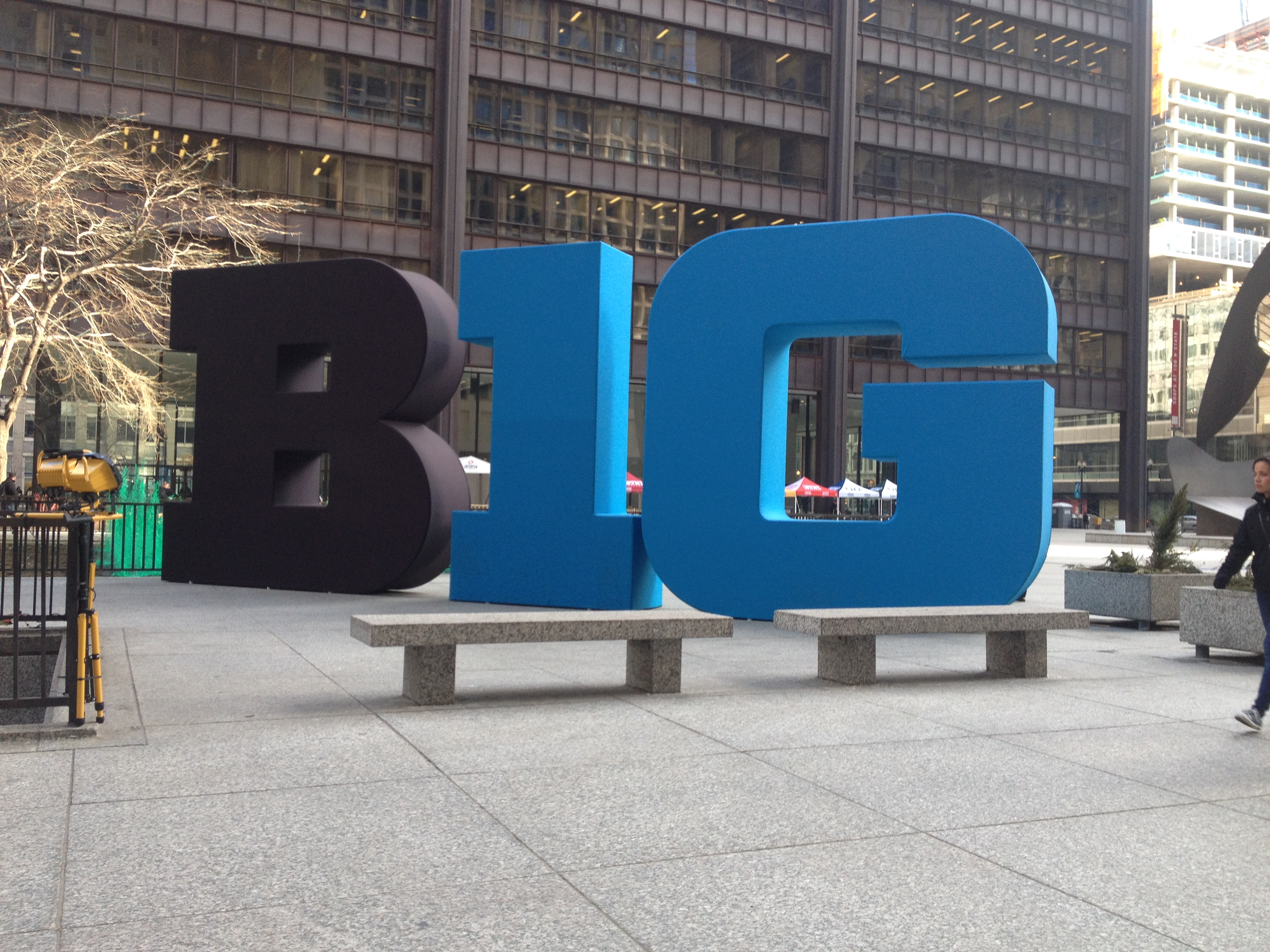
Big Ten logo at the Daley Center

All 14 Big Ten schools participated in the tournament. Teams were seeded by conference record, with a tiebreaker system used to seed teams with identical conference records. Seeding for the tournament was determined at the close of the regular conference season. The top 10 teams received a first round bye and the top four teams received a double bye. Tiebreaking procedures were unchanged from the 2014 tournament.

Seed	School	Conf.	Tiebreaker
1	Wisconsin	16–2	
2	Maryland	14–4	
3	Michigan State	12–6	2–0 vs Pur, Iowa
4	Purdue	12–6	1–1 vs MSU, Iowa
5	Iowa	12–6	0–2 vs MSU, Pur
6	Ohio State	11–7	
7	Indiana	9–9	1–0 vs Ill
8	Illinois	9–9	0–1 vs Ind
9	Michigan	8–10	
10	Northwestern	6–12	1–0 vs Minn
11	Minnesota	6–12	0–1 vs NW
12	Nebraska	5–13	
13	Penn State	4–14	
14	Rutgers	2–16	

== Game summaries ==
=== First round ===
ESPN2

Mar 11
3:30 pm

Recap

#13 Penn State 68, #12 Nebraska 65
Scoring by half: 34–29, 34–36
Pts: D. J. Newbill 26; Rebs: Devin Foster 8 Asts: two tied with 2	Pts: Tai Webster 29; Rebs: Shavon Shields 10; Asts: Shavon Shields 4

United Center
Chicago, IL
Attendance: 16,098
Referees: DJ Carstensen; Paul Szelc; Buddy Mayborg

BTN

Mar 11
6:00 pm

Recap

#11 Minnesota 80, #14 Rutgers 68
Scoring by half: 30–27, 50–41
Pts: Joey King 20; Rebs: Maurice Walker 10; Asts: DeAndre Mathieu 8	Pts: Kadeem Jack 18; Rebs: Junior Etou 9 Asts: Myles Mack 3

United Center
Chicago, IL
Attendance: 16,098
Referees: Larry Scirotto; Bill Ek; Kelly Pfeifer

=== Second round ===
BTN

Mar 12
11:00 am

Recap

#9 Michigan 73, #8 Illinois 55
Scoring by half: 40–23, 33–32
Pts: Aubrey Dawkins 18; Rebs: Muhammad-Ali Abdur-Rahkman 8 Asts: Zak Irvin 6	Pts: Malcolm Hill 13; Rebs: Rayvonte Rice 9 Asts: Jaylon Tate 2

United Center
Chicago, IL
Attendance: 16,028
Referees: Terry Wymer; Larry Scirotto; Glen Mayborg

BTN

Mar 12
1:30 pm

Recap

#13 Penn State 67, #5 Iowa 58
Scoring by half: 19–27, 48–31
Pts: D. J. Newbill 18; Rebs: Ross Travis 7 Asts: Geno Thorpe 3	Pts: Aaron White 21; Rebs: Aaron White 13; Asts: Mike Gesell 5

United Center
Chicago, IL
Attendance: 16,028
Referees: Lamont Simpson; Bill Ek; Paul Szelc

ESPN2

Mar 12
5:30 pm

Recap

#7 Indiana 71, #10 Northwestern 56
Scoring by half: 36–22, 35–34
Pts: James Blackmon Jr. 25; Rebs: Troy Williams 12; Asts: James Blackmon Jr. 7	Pts: Bryant McIntosh 13; Rebs: Alex Olah 7 Asts: Bryant McIntosh 5

United Center
Chicago, IL
Attendance: 16,549
Referees: Gene Steratore; Ray Perone; Chris Beaver

ESPN2

Mar 12
8:00 pm

Recap

#6 Ohio State 79, #11 Minnesota 73
Scoring by half: 35–35, 44–38
Pts: D'Angelo Russell 23; Rebs: Sam Thompson 7 Asts: Shannon Scott 6	Pts: DeAndre Mathieu 16; Rebs: Andre Hollins 5 Asts: Andre Hollins 4

United Center
Chicago, IL
Attendance: 16,549
Referees: DJ Carstensen; Steve McJunkins; Rob Riley

=== Quarterfinals ===
ESPN

Mar 13
11:00 am

Recap

#1 Wisconsin 71, #9 Michigan 60
Scoring by half: 31–26, 40–34
Pts: Sam Dekker 17; Rebs: Frank Kaminsky 12; Asts: Sam Dekker 6	Pts: Zak Irvin 21; Rebs: Zak Irvin 11; Asts: Max Bielfeldt 4

United Center
Chicago, IL
Attendance: 17,290
Referees: Lamont Simpson; Chris Beaver; Lewis Garrison

ESPN

Mar 13
1:30 pm

Recap

#4 Purdue 64, #13 Penn State 59
Scoring by half: 32–37, 32–22
Pts: A. J. Hammons 23; Rebs: Jon Octeus 11; Asts: Dakota Mathias	Pts: D. J. Newbill 19; Rebs: Ross Travis 9 Asts: D. J. Newbill 3

United Center
Chicago, IL
Attendance: 17,290
Referees: Terry Wymer; Terry Oglesby; Rob Riley

BTN

Mar 13
5:30 pm

Recap

#2 Maryland 75, #7 Indiana 69
Scoring by half: 42–40, 42–33
Pts: Dez Wells 22; Rebs: Jake Layman 9 Asts: two tied with 3	Pts: Yogi Ferrell 18; Rebs: Emmitt Holt 12; Asts: Yogi Ferrell 3

United Center
Chicago, IL
Attendance: 17,230
Referees: DJ Carstensen; Paul Szelc; Ray Perone

BTN

Mar 13
8:00 pm

Recap

#3 Michigan State 76, #6 Ohio State 67
Scoring by half: 36–28, 40–39
Pts: Denzel Valentine 23; Rebs: Branden Dawson 8 Asts: two tied with 7	Pts: D'Angelo Russell 19; Rebs: two tied with 8 Asts: Shannon Scott 9

United Center
Chicago, IL
Attendance: 17,230
Referees: Gene Steratore; Larry Scirotto; Kelly Pfeifer

=== Semifinals ===
CBS

Mar 14
12:00 pm

Recap

#1 Wisconsin 71, #4 Purdue 51
Scoring by half: 30–35, 41–16
Pts: Bronson Koenig 19; Rebs: Sam Dekker 8 Asts: two tied with 5	Pts: A. J. Hammons 10; Rebs: two tied with 7 Asts: Jon Octeus 4

United Center
Chicago, IL
Attendance: 18,088
Referees: Gene Steratore; Lemont Simpson; Terry Oglesby

CBS

Mar 14
2:30 pm

Recap

#3 Michigan State 62, #2 Maryland 58
Scoring by half: 25–33, 37–25
Pts: Travis Trice 20; Rebs: Branden Dawson 8 Asts: Denzel Valentine 7	Pts: Melo Trimble 22; Rebs: Dez Wells 7 Asts: Jake Layman 5

United Center
Chicago, IL
Attendance: 18,088
Referees: Terry Wymer; DJ Carsetensen; Paul Szelc

=== Championship ===
CBS

Mar 15
2:30 pm

Recap

#1 Wisconsin 80, #3 Michigan State 69 (OT)
Scoring by half: 31–32, 38–37 Overtime: 11–0
Pts: Nigel Hayes 25; Rebs: two tied with 5 Asts: Bronson Koenig 9	Pts: Branden Dawson; Denzel Valentine 16; Rebs: Denzel Valentine 8 Asts: Denzel Valentine 6

United Center
Chicago, IL
Attendance: 17,213
Referees: Lamont Simpson; Terry Wymer; Gene Steratore

== Bracket ==
First round Wednesday, March 11; ESPN2/BTN
12	Nebraska	65
13	Penn State	68
11	Minnesota	80
14	Rutgers	68

Second round Thursday, March 12; ESPN2/BTN
8	Illinois	55
9	Michigan	73
5	Iowa	58
13	Penn State	67
7	Indiana	71
10	Northwestern	56
6	Ohio State	79
11	Minnesota	73

Quarterfinals; Friday, March 13; ESPN/BTN
1	Wisconsin	71
9	Michigan	60
4	Purdue	64
13	Penn State	59
2	Maryland	75
7	Indiana	69
3	Michigan State	76
6	Ohio State	67

Semifinals; Saturday, March 14; CBS
1	Wisconsin	71
4	Purdue	51
2	Maryland	58
3	Michigan State	62

Championship; Sunday, March 15; CBS
1	Wisconsin	80^{OT}
3	Michigan State	69

== All-Tournament Team ==
- Frank Kaminsky, Wisconsin – Big Ten tournament Most Outstanding Player
- Branden Dawson, Michigan State
- Travis Trice, Michigan State
- D. J. Newbill, Penn State
- Nigel Hayes, Wisconsin

== See also ==
- 2015 Big Ten Conference women's basketball tournament
