= Robert Johnson (basketball) =

American basketball player (born 1995)

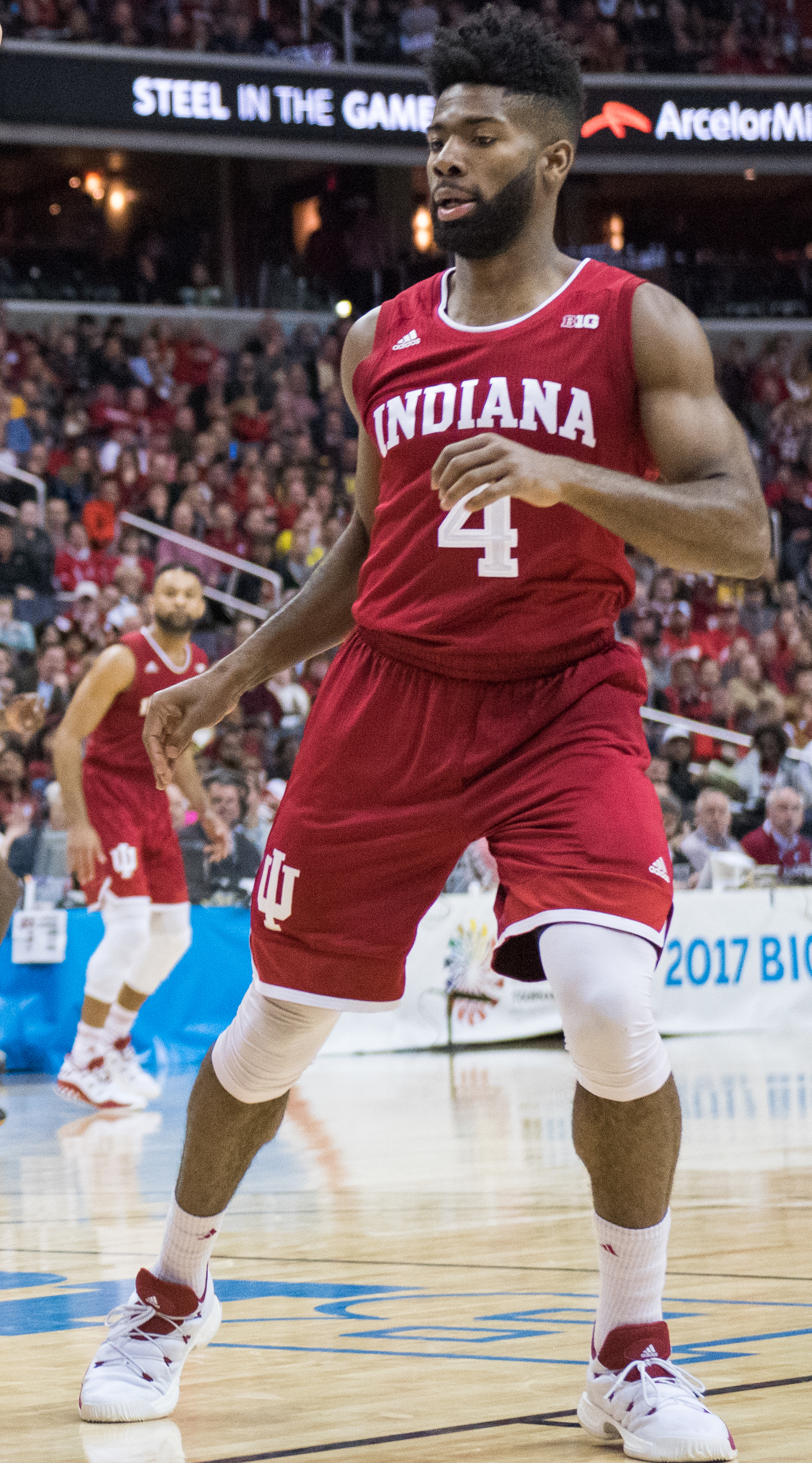

Personal information
- Born: May 27, 1995 (age 31) Richmond, Virginia, U.S.
- Listed height: 6 ft 4 in (1.93 m)
- Listed weight: 194 lb (88 kg)

Career information
- High school: Benedictine (Richmond, Virginia)
- College: Indiana (2014–2018)
- NBA draft: 2018: undrafted
- Playing career: 2018–2023
- Position: Shooting guard

Career history
- 2018–2019: Wisconsin Herd
- 2019: MKS Dąbrowa Górnicza
- 2019–2021: Parma
- 2021: Lokman Hekim Fethiye Belediyespor
- 2021–2022: Pallacanestro Cantù
- 2022: Legia Warszawa
- 2022–2023: Napoli Basket
- 2023: ADA Blois
- 2023: Raptors 905

Career highlights
- PLK scoring champion (2022)
- Stats at Basketball Reference

Robert Alfonso Johnson Jr. (born May 27, 1995) is an American former professional basketball player. He played college basketball for the Indiana Hoosiers.

== College career ==
Johnson averaged 12.8 points and 2.5 assists per game as a junior at Indiana. He declared for the NBA draft but opted to return to the Hoosiers. As a senior, Johnson averaged 14.0 points, 4.5 rebounds and 2.7 assists per game. Johnson was named honorable mention All-Big Ten by the coaches. He finished 21st in career scoring at Indiana with 1,413 points.

== Professional career ==
After going undrafted in the 2018 NBA draft, he represented the Atlanta Hawks during the NBA summer league in Las Vegas and Salt Lake City. Johnson played for the Wisconsin Herd in his rookie season, averaging 7.3 points, 2.7 rebounds and 1.9 assists per game. On August 8, 2019, he joined the Polish team MKS Dąbrowa Górnicza.

On December 15, 2019, he signed with Parma of the VTB United League. Johnson signed a two-year extension with Parma on July 16, 2020.

On January 21, 2021, Johnson signed with Lokman Hekim Fethiye Belediyespor of the Turkish BSL. He averaged 19.7 points, 4.9 rebounds and 4.1 assists per game. Johnson subsequently joined Pallacanestro Cantù and on January 19, 2022, he signed with Legia Warszawa of the Polish Basketball League.

On August 1, 2022, Johnson signed with Napoli Basket of the Italian Lega Basket Serie A (LBA).

On January 9, 2023, Johnson signed with ADA Blois Basket 41 of the French Pro A.

On October 30, 2023, Johnson joined the Motor City Cruise, but was waived on November 8. On November 17, he joined Raptors 905, but was waived the next day. One day later, he rejoined the Raptors, but was waived on November 24.
