= 2015 Horizon League men's basketball tournament =

- Classification: Division I
- Season: 2014–15
- Teams: 8
- First round site: Campus sites
- Semifinals site: Athletics–Recreation Center; Valparaiso, Indiana
- Finals site: Athletics–Recreation Center; Valparaiso, Indiana
- Champions: Valparaiso (2nd title)
- Winning coach: Bryce Drew (2nd title)
- MVP: Alec Peters (Valparaiso)
- Television: ESPN3, ESPNU, ESPN

2014–15 Horizon League men's basketball standings
	Conf.				Overall
Team	W		L	PCT	W		L	PCT
Valparaiso †	13	–	3	.813	28	–	6	.824
Green Bay	12	–	4	.750	24	–	9	.727
Oakland	11	–	5	.688	16	–	17	.485
Cleveland State	11	–	5	.688	19	–	15	.559
Milwaukee *	9	–	7	.563	14	–	16	.467
Detroit	7	–	9	.438	15	–	18	.455
UIC	4	–	12	.250	10	–	24	.294
Wright State	3	–	13	.188	11	–	20	.355
Youngstown State	2	–	14	.125	11	–	21	.344
† 2015 Horizon League Tournament winner * Ineligible for postseason play due to APR penalties

The 2015 Horizon League men's basketball tournament began on March 3, 2015, with the championship game on Tuesday, March 10. First round games were played on the home court of the higher-seeded team. The second round and semifinals were hosted by Valparaiso, because the Crusaders won the regular season conference championship. Since Valparaiso won its semifinal game, it also hosted the championship game. Only eight of the nine teams in the conference played in the Horizon League Tournament, as Milwaukee has been deemed ineligible for postseason play for the 2014–15 season.

Teams were seeded by 2014–15 Horizon League season record, with a tiebreaker system to seed teams with identical conference records. The top two teams received a bye to the semifinals and the third and fourth seeds received byes to the quarterfinals.

== Tie breaking system ==
The tiebreaking system is as follows:

Two teams

1. Head to head conference record.
2. Record against the team occupying the highest position in the standings. Continue down through the standings until the tie is broken.
3. Higher RPI based on Collegiate Basketball News.

Three or more teams

1. Combined record of each of the tied teams against the other teams involved in the tie until the tie is broken.
2. Record against the team occupying the highest position in the standings. Continue down through the standings until the tie is reduced to a two-team tie. Use the two team system.
3. Higher RPI based on Collegiate Basketball News.

== Seeds ==
Seed	Team	Record	Tiebreaker
1	Valparaiso	13–3	
2	Green Bay	12–4	
3	Oakland	11–5	1–1 vs CSU, 1–1 vs. VU
4	Cleveland State	11–5	1–1 vs OU, 0–2 vs. VU
5	Detroit	7–9	
6	UIC	4–12	
7	Wright State	3–13	
8	Youngstown State	2–14	

== Schedule ==
Game	Time	Matchup	Television
First round – Tuesday, March 3
1	7:00 pm	Youngstown State 67 at Detroit 77	ESPN3
2	7:00 pm	Wright State 57 at UIC 60	ESPN3
Quarterfinals – Friday, March 6 (at Valparaiso)
3	7:00 pm	Oakland 69 vs. UIC 72	ESPN3
4	9:30 pm	Cleveland State 70 vs. Detroit 53	ESPN3
Semifinals – Saturday, March 7 (at Valparaiso)
5	7:00 pm	Green Bay 70 vs. UIC 56	ESPNU*
6	9:30 pm	Cleveland State 55 at Valparaiso 60	ESPNU
Championship – Tuesday, March 10 (at Valparaiso)
7	7:00 pm	Green Bay 44 at Valparaiso 54	ESPN
All game times in Eastern Time Zone. * Tape delayed on ESPNU at 11:30 pm EST.

== Bracket ==
First round Tuesday, March 3 ESPN3
5	Detroit	77
8	Youngstown State	67
6	UIC	60
7	Wright State	57

Quarterfinals; Friday, March 6 ESPN3
4	Cleveland State	70
5	Detroit	53
3	Oakland	69
6	UIC	72

Semifinals; Saturday, March 7 ESPNU
1	Valparaiso	60
4	Cleveland State	55
2	Green Bay	70
6	UIC	56

Championship; Tuesday, March 10; ESPN
1	Valparaiso	54
2	Green Bay	44

First round games at campus sites of higher seeds.
Second round and semifinals hosted by No. 1 seed.
Championship game hosted by highest remaining seed.
