= 2014–15 Michigan State Spartans men's basketball team =

American college basketball season

2014–15 Michigan State Spartans men's basketball

NCAA tournament, Final Four
- Conference: Big Ten Conference

Ranking
- Coaches: No. 7
- AP: No. 23
- Record: 27–12 (12–6 Big Ten)
- Head coach: Tom Izzo (20th season)
- Associate head coach: Dwayne Stephens (12th season)
- Assistant coaches: Mike Garland (8th season); Dane Fife (4th season)
- Captains: Branden Dawson; Travis Trice; Denzel Valentine
- Home arena: Breslin Center

2014–15 Big Ten Conference men's basketball standings
	Conf.				Overall
Team	W		L	PCT	W		L	PCT
No. 3 Wisconsin †	16	–	2	.889	36	–	4	.900
No. 12 Maryland	14	–	4	.778	28	–	7	.800
No. 23 Michigan State	12	–	6	.667	27	–	12	.692
Iowa	12	–	6	.667	22	–	12	.647
Purdue	12	–	6	.667	21	–	13	.618
Ohio State	11	–	7	.611	24	–	11	.686
Indiana	9	–	9	.500	20	–	14	.588
Illinois	9	–	9	.500	19	–	14	.576
Michigan	8	–	10	.444	16	–	16	.500
Minnesota	6	–	12	.333	18	–	15	.545
Northwestern	6	–	12	.333	15	–	17	.469
Nebraska	5	–	13	.278	13	–	18	.419
Penn State	4	–	14	.222	18	–	16	.529
Rutgers	2	–	16	.111	10	–	22	.313
† 2015 Big Ten tournament winner Rankings from AP poll

The 2014–15 Michigan State Spartans men's basketball team represented Michigan State University in the 2014–15 NCAA Division I men's basketball season. The Spartans, led by 20th-year head coach Tom Izzo, played their home games at the Breslin Center in East Lansing, Michigan as members of the Big Ten Conference. MSU finished with a record of 27–12, 12–6 in Big Ten play to finish in a three-way tie for third place. They defeated Ohio State and Maryland to advance to the Big Ten tournament championship, where they lost to Wisconsin. They received an at-large bid to the NCAA tournament as the No. 7 seed in the East region. They defeated Georgia and Virginia to advance to the Sweet Sixteen. They defeated Oklahoma and Louisville to advance to the Final Four for the seventh time under Tom Izzo. There, the Spartans lost to eventual National Champion, Duke.

== Previous season ==
The Spartans finished the 2013–14 season with a record of 29–9, 12–6 in Big Ten play to finish in second place. They won the Big Ten tournament by defeating Michigan, and received the conference's automatic bid as a No. 4 seed in the NCAA tournament, their 17th straight trip to the tournament. They advanced to the Elite Eight, their eighth trip under Tom Izzo, before losing to eventual National Champion, UConn.

The Spartans lost Adreian Payne (16.4 points and 7.3 rebounds per game) and Gary Harris (16.7 points per game) to the NBA draft and Keith Appling (11.2 points per game) to graduation (eventually to the NBA) following the season.

== Offseason ==
=== 2014 recruiting class ===
Tom Izzo again went big in recruiting for the 2014 season and again was shunned. Michigan State made offers to Cliff Alexander, Tyus Jones, Jahlil Okafor, and Tyler Ulis, but all went to other schools. As a result, MSU signed only one top 100 player, Lourawls Nairn, Jr. Analysts have argued that Izzo's unwillingness to cheat cost him some of these recruits.

College recruiting
Name	Hometown	School	Height	Weight	Commit date
Lourawls Nairn, Jr. #14 PG	Bel Aire, KS	Sunrise Christian Academy	5 ft 10 in (1.78 m)	170 lb (77 kg)	Sep 26, 2013
Lourawls Nairn, Jr. #14 PG	Recruit ratings: Scout: Rivals: 247Sports: ESPN:				
Javon Bess #24 SF	Gahanna, OH	Lincoln High School	6 ft 5 in (1.96 m)	195 lb (88 kg)	Oct 21, 2013
Javon Bess #24 SF	Recruit ratings: Scout: Rivals: 247Sports: ESPN:				
Marvin Clark, Jr. #43 SF	Blue Springs, MO	Sunrise Christian Academy	6 ft 7 in (2.01 m)	219 lb (99 kg)	Mar 24, 2014
Marvin Clark, Jr. #43 SF	Recruit ratings: Scout: Rivals: 247Sports: ESPN:				
Overall recruit ranking:
Note: In many cases, Scout, Rivals, 247Sports, On3, and ESPN may conflict in their listings of height and weight.; In these cases, the average was taken. ESPN grades are on a 100-point scale.; Sources: "Michigan State Commit List for 2014". Rivals.; "Men's Basketball Recruiting". Scout.; "ESPN - Michigan State Spartans Basketball Recruiting 2014". ESPN.; "Scout.com Team Recruiting Rankings". Scout.; "2014 Team Ranking". Rivals.

== Roster ==
2014–15 Michigan State Spartans men's basketball team
Players
Coaches

Pos.	#	Name	Height	Weight	Year	Previous school	Hometown
G	2	Javon Bess	6 ft 5 in (1.96 m)	205 lb (93 kg)	Fr	Lincoln H.S.	Gahanna, OH
F	13	Trevor Bohnhoff (W)	6 ft 7 in (2.01 m)	225 lb (102 kg)	Jr	Nouvel H.S.	Saginaw, MI
F	0	Marvin Jr. Clark	6 ft 6 in (1.98 m)	225 lb (102 kg)	Fr	Sunrise Christian Academy	Blue Springs, MO
F	10	Matt Costello	6 ft 9 in (2.06 m)	245 lb (111 kg)	Jr	Jefferson H.S.	Bay City, MI
F	22	Branden Dawson (C)	6 ft 6 in (1.98 m)	225 lb (102 kg)	Sr	Lew Wallace H.S.	Gary, IN
G	3	Alvin Ellis III	6 ft 4 in (1.93 m)	205 lb (93 kg)	So	De La Salle	Chicago, IL
G	5	Bryn Forbes	6 ft 3 in (1.91 m)	175 lb (79 kg)	Jr	Sexton H.S. Cleveland State	Lansing, MI
F	25	Kenny Goins (W)	6 ft 6 in (1.98 m)	215 lb (98 kg)	Fr	Warren Mott H.S.	Troy, MI
G	14	Eron Harris (I)	6 ft 2 in (1.88 m)	195 lb (88 kg)	Jr	Lawrence North H.S. West Virginia	Indianapolis, IN
G	11	Lourawls Jr. Nairn	5 ft 10 in (1.78 m)	170 lb (77 kg)	Fr	Sunrise Christian Academy	Bel Aire, KS
F	34	Gavin Schilling	6 ft 9 in (2.06 m)	240 lb (109 kg)	So	Findlay Prep	Chicago, IL
G	20	Travis Trice (C)	6 ft 0 in (1.83 m)	170 lb (77 kg)	Sr	Wayne H.S.	Huber Heights, OH
G	15	Keenan Wetzel (W)	6 ft 4 in (1.93 m)	215 lb (98 kg)	RS Sr	St. Mary Catholic Central H.S.	Monroe, MI
G	41	Colby Wollenman	6 ft 7 in (2.01 m)	235 lb (107 kg)	RS Jr	Big Horn H.S.	Big Horn, WY
G	45	Denzel Valentine (C)	6 ft 5 in (1.96 m)	220 lb (100 kg)	Jr	Sexton H.S.	Lansing, MI
F	30	Matt Van Dyk (W)	6 ft 5 in (1.96 m)	205 lb (93 kg)	Jr	Imlay City	Imlay City, MI

Head coach

- Tom Izzo (Northern Michigan)

Assistant coach(es)

- Dwayne Stephens (Michigan State)
- Dane Fife (Indiana)
- Mike Garland (Northern Michigan)

Legend

- (C) Team captain
- (S) Suspended
- (I) Ineligible
- (W) Walk-on
- Injured
- Current redshirt

Roster

== Season summary ==
Michigan State was led by seniors Travis Trice (15.3 points and 5.1 assists per game) and Branden Dawson (11.9 points and 9.1 rebounds per game) and junior Denzel Valentine (14.5 points, 6.3 rebounds, and 4.3 assists per game). The Spartans started the season ranked No. 18 in the country.

The Spartans had two players transfer to the team. Eron Harris transferred from West Virginia. Under NCAA transfer rules, Harris had to redshirt for the 2014–15 season. Bryn Forbes transferred from Cleveland State. The NCAA granted Forbes a waiver due to family hardship that allowed Forbes to play immediately without having sit out a season.

MSU began the season with a trip to play Navy in Annapolis, Maryland at the Naval Academy. The Spartans survived a scare to win a close game 64–59. The Spartans then traveled to Indianapolis, Indiana to participate in the Champions Classic, but were unable to outlast Duke (whom they would later meet in the Final Four), losing 81–71. MSU won their next four games, including wins over Santa Clara, Rider, and Marquette in the Orlando Classic. In the championship game of the Orlando Classic, the Spartans fell to No. 11 Kansas 61–56. Despite the loss, MSU moved up to No. 19 in the polls. In the ACC–Big Ten Challenge, MSU could not hold off Notre Dame, losing in overtime 79–78. Wins followed against smaller schools including Oakland and Eastern Michigan before MSU was shocked by Texas Southern at home in overtime. Following the loss, the Spartans went unranked the remainder of the season. They finished the non-conference season at 9–4.

In the Big Ten season, the Spartans were swept by Maryland and suffered bad losses to Nebraska, Illinois, and Minnesota in overtime. However, the Spartans rallied late in the season, winning six of their last eight conference games including a win over No. 23 Ohio State and wins at Michigan and at Illinois. MSU finished the season in a three-way tie for third place in conference. The Spartans finished the season with an overall record of 21–10, 12–6 in the Big Ten regular season. The Spartans got hot in the Big Ten tournament beating Ohio State and No. 8 Maryland. They challenged No. 6 Wisconsin for the tournament title, eventually losing the Big Ten tournament Championship in overtime.

The Spartans received an at-large bid to the NCAA tournament as a No. 7 seed in the East Region. The bid was MSU's 18th straight trip to the NCAA Tournament. MSU beat Georgia in the First Round and surprised No. 2-seeded and No. 6-ranked Virginia in the Second Round. With the win, the Spartans advanced to their fourth straight Sweet Sixteen and seventh Sweet Sixteen in eight years. In the Sweet Sixteen, they faced No. 3-seeded and No. 13-ranked Oklahoma. MSU defeated Oklahoma by four. Valentine scored 18 points and Trice contributed 24. The win sent MSU to the Elite Eight for the second consecutive year and their fourth trip since 2009. Louisville awaited the Spartans in the Elite Eight. The Spartans were pushed to overtime, but again came up with the victory, earning a trip to their seventh Final Four under Tom Izzo. Trice was named the Regional's MVP. In the Final Four, the Spartans fell to the eventual National Champions for the second straight season, losing a rematch of their Champions Classic game to Duke in the National Semifinal.

== Schedule and results ==
Date time, TV	Rank^{#}	Opponent^{#}	Result	Record	High points	High rebounds	High assists	Site (attendance) city, state
Exhibition
Nov 3, 2014*; 7:00 pm	No. 18	The Master's College	W 97–56		24 – Valentine	12 – Valentine	9 – Trice	Breslin Center (14,797); East Lansing, MI
Nov 7, 2014*; 8:00 pm	No. 18	St. Cloud State	W 101–46		20 – Trice	11 – Valentine	11 – Valentine	Breslin Center (14,797); East Lansing, MI
Non-conference regular season
Nov 14, 2014*; 9:00 pm, CBSSN	No. 18	at Navy; Veterans Classic	W 64–59	1–0	25 – Trice	8 – Dawson	6 – Valentine	Alumni Hall (5,699); Annapolis, MD
Nov 18, 2014*; 7:00 pm, ESPN	No. 19	vs. No. 4 Duke; Champions Classic	L 71–81	1–1	18 – Dawson	9 – Dawson	8 – Trice	Bankers Life Fieldhouse (19,306); Indianapolis, IN
Nov 21, 2014*; 7:00 pm, BTN	No. 19	Loyola–Chicago	W 87–52	2–1	15 – Clark Jr./Dawson	11 – Costello	7 – Nairn Jr./Trice/Valentine	Breslin Center (14,797); East Lansing, MI
Nov 24, 2014*; 7:00 pm, BTN	No. 20	Santa Clara; Orlando Classic Opening Round	W 79–52	3–1	19 – Trice	11 – Schilling/Valentine	8 – Trice	Breslin Center (14,797); East Lansing, MI
Nov 27, 2014*; 6:30 pm, ESPN2	No. 20	vs. Rider; Orlando Classic Quarterfinals	W 77–45	4–1	19 – Valentine	9 – Costello	4 – Trice	HP Field House (3,216); Lake Buena Vista, FL
Nov 28, 2014*; 9:00 pm, ESPN2	No. 20	vs. Marquette; Orlando Classic Semifinals	W 79–68	5–1	25 – Valentine	8 – Dawson	7 – Trice	HP Field House (3,449); Lake Buena Vista, FL
Nov 30, 2014*; 1:00 pm, ESPN	No. 20	vs. No. 11 Kansas; Orlando Classic Championship	L 56–61	5–2	14 – Trice/Valentine	9 – Dawson	2 – Trice	HP Field House (4,842); Lake Buena Vista, FL
Dec 3, 2014*; 7:15 pm, ESPN2	No. 19	at Notre Dame; ACC–Big Ten Challenge	L 78–79 ^{OT}	5–3	22 – Valentine	18 – Dawson	5 – Trice	Edmund P. Joyce Center (9,149); South Bend, IN
Dec 6, 2014*; 2:15 pm, BTN	No. 19	Arkansas–Pine Bluff	W 85–52	6–3	15 – Costello/Trice	7 – Dawson	8 – Valentine	Breslin Center (14,797); East Lansing, MI
Dec 14, 2014*; 8:00 pm, ESPNU		Oakland	W 87–61	7–3	19 – Valentine	6 – Dawson/Schilling	8 – Trice	Breslin Center (14,797); East Lansing, MI
Dec 17, 2014*; 9:00 pm, BTN	No. 25	Eastern Michigan	W 66–46	8–3	14 – Forbes	9 – Costello	8 – Valentine	Breslin Center (14,797); East Lansing, MI
Dec 20, 2014*; 5:00 pm, ESPNU	No. 25	Texas Southern	L 64–71 ^{OT}	8–4	17 – Costello	10 – Costello	3 – Bess/Trice	Breslin Center (14,797); East Lansing, MI
Dec 22, 2014*; 6:00 pm		The Citadel	W 82–56	9–4	18 – Valentine	6 – Clark Jr./Valentine	11 – Trice	Breslin Center (14,797); East Lansing, MI
Big Ten regular season
Dec 30, 2014; 5:00 pm, ESPN2		No. 12 Maryland	L 66–68 ^{2OT}	9–5 (0–1)	26 – Trice	11 – Dawson	6 – Trice	Breslin Center (14,797); East Lansing, MI
Jan 5, 2015; 7:00 pm, BTN		Indiana	W 70–50	10–5 (1–1)	15 – Valentine	13 – Dawson	7 – Trice	Breslin Center (14,797); East Lansing, MI
Jan 8, 2015; 7:00 pm, ESPN		at Iowa	W 75–61	11–5 (2–1)	25 – Trice	15 – Dawson	6 – Valentine	Carver–Hawkeye Arena (15,054); Iowa City, IA
Jan 11, 2015; 12:00 pm, BTN		Northwestern	W 84–77 ^{OT}	12–5 (3–1)	18 – Trice	9 – Dawson	10 – Trice	Breslin Center (14,797); East Lansing, MI
Jan 17, 2015; 4:00 pm, CBS		at No. 14 Maryland	L 59–75	12–6 (3–2)	14 – Dawson	10 – Dawson	5 – Valentine	Xfinity Center (17,950); College Park, MD
Jan 21, 2015; 7:00 pm, BTN		Penn State	W 66–60	13–6 (4–2)	11 – Schilling/Valentine	10 – Dawson/Schilling	4 – Valentine	Breslin Center (14,797); East Lansing, MI
Jan 24, 2015; 4:00 pm, ESPN		at Nebraska	L 77–79	13–7 (4–3)	27 – Trice	18 – Dawson	3 – Trice/Valentine	Pinnacle Bank Arena (15,757); Lincoln, NE
Jan 29, 2015; 6:00 pm, BTN		at Rutgers	W 71–51	14–7 (5–3)	18 – Forbes	11 – Dawson	5 – Trice	Louis Brown Athletic Center (6,088); Piscataway, NJ
Feb 1, 2015; 1:00 pm, CBS		Michigan; Rivalry	W 76–66 ^{OT}	15–7 (6–3)	25 – Valentine	10 – Dawson	9 – Trice	Breslin Center (14,797); East Lansing, MI
Feb 7, 2015; 12:00 pm, ESPN		Illinois	L 54–59	15–8 (6–4)	16 – Valentine	7 – Costello/Valentine	4 – Valentine	Breslin Center (14,797); East Lansing, MI
Feb 10, 2015; 7:00 pm, BTN		at Northwestern	W 68–44	16–8 (7–4)	16 – Trice	10 – Dawson	8 – Valentine	Welsh-Ryan Arena (7,265); Evanston, IL
Feb 14, 2015; 12:00 pm, ESPN		No. 23 Ohio State	W 59–56	17–8 (8–4)	17 – Valentine	11 – Dawson	5 – Trice	Breslin Center (14,797); East Lansing, MI
Feb 17, 2015; 9:00 pm, ESPN		at Michigan; Rivalry	W 80–67	18–8 (9–4)	23 – Dawson	13 – Dawson	7 – Trice	Crisler Center (12,502); Ann Arbor, MI
Feb 22, 2015; 7:30 pm, BTN		at Illinois	W 60–53	19–8 (10–4)	20 – Valentine	9 – Valentine	4 – Trice	State Farm Center (16,108); Champaign, IL
Feb 26, 2015; 7:00 pm, BTN		Minnesota	L 90–96 ^{OT}	19–9 (10–5)	27 – Valentine	8 – Dawson	10 – Trice	Breslin Center (14,797); East Lansing, MI
Mar 1, 2015; 4:00 pm, CBS		at No. 5 Wisconsin	L 61–68	19–10 (10–6)	21 – Forbes	6 – Schilling	6 – Valentine	Kohl Center (17,279); Madison, WI
Mar 4, 2015; 8:00 pm, BTN		Purdue	W 72–66	20–10 (11–6)	27 – Trice	7 – Costello	6 – Trice	Breslin Center (14,797, 2015); East Lansing, MI
Mar 7, 2015; Noon, ESPN		at Indiana	W 74–72	21–10 (12–6)	21 – Trice	8 – Costello	7 – Valentine	Assembly Hall (17,472); Bloomington, IN
Big Ten tournament
Mar 13, 2015; 9:00 pm, BTN	(3)	vs. (6) Ohio State; Quarterfinals	W 76–67	22–10	23 – Valentine	8 – Dawson/Valentine	7 – Dawson/Valentine	United Center (17,230); Chicago, IL
Mar 14, 2015; 4:00 pm, CBS	(3)	vs. (2) No. 8 Maryland; Semifinals	W 62–58	23–10	20 – Trice	8 – Dawson	7 – Valentine	United Center (18,088); Chicago, IL
Mar 15, 2015; 3:30 pm, CBS	(3)	vs. (1) No. 6 Wisconsin; Championship	L 69–80 ^{OT}	23–11	16 – Dawson/Valentine	8 – Valentine	6 – Valentine	United Center (17,123); Chicago, IL
NCAA tournament
Mar 20, 2015*; 12:40 pm, truTV	(7 E) No. 23	vs. (10 E) Georgia; Second Round	W 70–63	24–11	16 – Valentine	7 – Costello	6 – Trice/Valentine	Time Warner Cable Arena (16,551); Charlotte, NC
Mar 22, 2015*; 12:10 pm, CBS	(7 E) No. 23	vs. (2 E) No. 6 Virginia; Third Round	W 60–54	25–11	23 – Trice	9 – Dawson	4 – Valentine	Time Warner Cable Arena (18,482); Charlotte, NC
Mar 27, 2015*; 10:16 pm, TBS	(7 E) No. 23	vs. (3 E) No. 13 Oklahoma; Sweet Sixteen	W 62–58	26–11	24 – Trice	11 – Dawson	2 – Dawson/Trice/Valentine	Carrier Dome (24,453); Syracuse, NY
Mar 29, 2015*; 2:20 pm, CBS	(7 E) No. 23	vs. (4 E) No. 17 Louisville; Elite Eight	W 76–70 ^{OT}	27–11	17 – Trice	11 – Dawson	6 – Valentine	Carrier Dome (24,404); Syracuse, NY
Apr 4, 2015*; 6:09 pm, TBS	(7 E) No. 23	vs. (1 S) No. 4 Duke; Final Four	L 61–81	27–12	22 – Valentine	11 – Valentine	5 – Nairn Jr./Valentine	Lucas Oil Stadium (72,238); Indianapolis, IN
*Non-conference game. ^{#}Rankings from AP Poll. (#) Tournament seedings in parentheses. All times are in Eastern Time Source.

== Player statistics ==
Individual player statistics (final)
			Minutes		Scoring		Total FGs			3-point FGs			Free-throws			Rebounds							
Player	GP	GS	Tot	Avg	Pts	Avg	FG	FGA	Pct	3FG	3FA	Pct	FT	FTA	Pct	Off	Def	Tot	Avg	A	Stl	Blk	Tov
Bess, Javon	12		148	12.3	32	2.7	11	23	.478	1	2	.500	9	21	.429	15	20	35	2.9	12	4	3	9
Bohnhoff, Trevor	13		23	1.8	2	0.2	0	0		0	0		2	4	.500	1	2	3	0.2	0	1	0	0
Clark, Marvin	39		437	11.2	179	4.5	64	127	.504	21	62	.336	27	40	.675	30	56	86	2.2	11	9	12	29
Costello, Matt	39		794	20.4	273	7.0	110	190	.579	0	4	.000	53	79	.671	79	123	202	5.2	29	16	48	31
Dawson, Branden	35		1055	30.1	415	11.9	182	340	.535	0	0		51	104	.490	102	216	318	9.1	59	42	58	67
Ellis, Alvin	32		274	8.6	55	1.7	17	53	.321	6	25	.240	15	33	.455	4	18	22	0.7	18	12	5	18
Forbes, Bryn	39		1022	26.2	332	8.5	110	246	.447	70	164	.427	42	52	.808	8	48	56	1.4	38	23	5	31
Nairn, Lourawls	39		758	19	85	2.2	28	88	.318	3	10	.300	26	48	.542	6	56	62	1.6	94	11	1	36
Schilling, Gavin	39		659	16.9	199	5.1	82	141	.582	0	0		35	73	.476	66	84	150	3.8	15	7	25	33
Trice, Travis	39		1309	33.6	598	15.3	195	497	.397	90	244	.369	118	165	.715	18	105	123	3.2	197	40	6	69
Valentine, Denzel	39		1295	33.2	567	14.5	197	445	.443	102	245	.416	71	86	.826	46	199	245	6.3	167	35	9	92
Wetzel, Keenan	14		31	2.2	3	0.2	1	9	.111	1	7	.143	0	0		1	3	4	0.3	0	0	0	1
Wollenman, Colby	29		220	7.6	36	1.2	17	28	.607	0	0		2	9	.222	14	35	49	1.7	6	3	4	12
Total	35		7050		2793	79.8	1009	2078	.486	321	739	.434	454	623	.729	427	1027	1454	40.5	719	414	177	156
Opponents	39		8025		2482	63.6	833	2104	.396	.224	712	.315	592	820	.722	378	869	1247		409	217	110	416

Legend
GP	Games played	GS	Games started	Avg	Average per game
FG	Field-goals made	FGA	Field-goal attempts	Off	Offensive rebounds
Def	Defensive rebounds	A	Assists	TO	Turnovers
Blk	Blocks	Stl	Steals	High	Team high

== Rankings ==
Ranking movements Legend: ██ Increase in ranking ██ Decrease in ranking — = Not ranked RV = Received votes
	Week																			
Poll	Pre	1	2	3	4	5	6	7	8	9	10	11	12	13	14	15	16	17	18	Final
AP	18	19	20	19	RV	25	—	—	—	RV	RV	—	RV	—	RV	RV	—	RV	23	Not released
Coaches	18	19	19	18	23	22	RV	—	—	RV	RV	—	RV	—	RV	25	RV	RV	22	7

*AP does not release post-NCAA tournament rankings.

== Awards and honors ==
=== Post-season awards ===
==== Branden Dawson ====
- All Big Ten Second Team
- Big Ten All-Defensive Team
- NABCA All-District Second Team
- USBWA All-District Team

==== Travis Trice ====
- All Big Ten Third Team
- NCAA Tournament East Region Most Outstanding Player

==== Denzel Valentine ====
- All Big Ten Third Team
- USBWA All-District Team
- NCAA Tournament All-East Regional Team
