= 2014–15 Maryland Terrapins men's basketball team =

American college basketball season

2014–15 Maryland Terrapins men's basketball
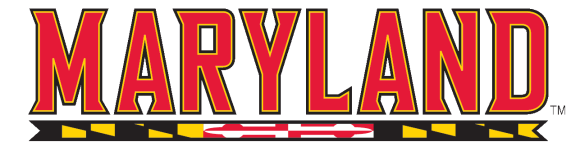

CBE Hall of Fame Classic champions

NCAA tournament, Round of 32
- Conference: Big Ten Conference

Ranking
- Coaches: No. 16
- AP: No. 12
- Record: 28–7 (14–4 Big Ten)
- Head coach: Mark Turgeon (4th season)
- Assistant coaches: Dustin Clark; Bino Ranson; Cliff Warren
- Home arena: Xfinity Center

2014–15 Big Ten Conference men's basketball standings
	Conf.				Overall
Team	W		L	PCT	W		L	PCT
No. 3 Wisconsin †	16	–	2	.889	36	–	4	.900
No. 12 Maryland	14	–	4	.778	28	–	7	.800
No. 23 Michigan State	12	–	6	.667	27	–	12	.692
Iowa	12	–	6	.667	22	–	12	.647
Purdue	12	–	6	.667	21	–	13	.618
Ohio State	11	–	7	.611	24	–	11	.686
Indiana	9	–	9	.500	20	–	14	.588
Illinois	9	–	9	.500	19	–	14	.576
Michigan	8	–	10	.444	16	–	16	.500
Minnesota	6	–	12	.333	18	–	15	.545
Northwestern	6	–	12	.333	15	–	17	.469
Nebraska	5	–	13	.278	13	–	18	.419
Penn State	4	–	14	.222	18	–	16	.529
Rutgers	2	–	16	.111	10	–	22	.313
† 2015 Big Ten tournament winner Rankings from AP poll

The 2014–15 Maryland Terrapins men's basketball team represented the University of Maryland, College Park in the 2014–15 NCAA Division I men's basketball season. They were led by fourth year head coach Mark Turgeon and played their home games at the Xfinity Center. They were first-year members of the Big Ten Conference. They finished the season 28–7, 14–4 in Big Ten play to finish in second place. They advanced to the semifinals of the Big Ten tournament where they lost to Michigan State. They received an at-large bid to the NCAA tournament where they defeated Valparaiso in the second round before losing in the third round to West Virginia.

== Previous season ==
The Terrapins finished the season 17–15, 9–9 in ACC play to finish in a three-way tie for seventh place. They lost in the first round of the ACC Tournament to Florida State.

== Pre-season ==
=== Departures ===
Name	Number	Pos.	Height	Weight	Year	Hometown	Notes
Charles Mitchell	0	F	6'7"	260	Sophomore	Atlanta, GA	Transferred to Georgia Tech
Roddy Peters	2	G	6'4"	195	Freshman	District Heights, MD	Transferred to South Florida
Seth Allen	4	G	6'1"	190	Sophomore	Woodbridge, VA	Transferred to Virginia Tech
Nick Faust	5	G	6'6"	175	Junior	Baltimore, MD	Transferred to Long Beach State
John Auslander	23	F	6'7"	225	Senior	Herndon, VA	Graduated
A. J. Metz	33	F	6'7"	215	Freshman	Leesburg, VA	Transferred to Guilford
Shaquille Cleare	44	C	6'9"	270	Sophomore	Andros, Bahamas	Transferred to Texas
Conner Lipinski	12	G	5'10"	155	Sophomore	Gambrills, Maryland	Transferred to Lenoir-Rhyne

=== Incoming transfers ===
Name	Number	Pos.	Height	Weight	Year	Hometown	Previous School
Robert Carter Jr.	4	F	6'8"	247	Junior	Thomasville, GA	Transferred from Georgia Tech. Under NCAA transfer rules, Carter, Jr. will have to redshirt for the 2014–15 season. Will have two years of remaining eligibility thereafter.
Richaud Pack	20	G	6'3"	183	Senior	Detroit, MI	Transferred from North Carolina A&T. Will be eligible to play immediately because Pack graduated from North Carolina A&T.

=== Class of 2014 signees ===
College recruiting
Name	Hometown	School	Height	Weight	Commit date
Romelo Trimble; SG	Upper Marlboro, Maryland	Bishop Denis J. O'Connell High School	6 ft 2 in (1.88 m)	175 lb (79 kg)	Dec 13, 2013
Romelo Trimble; SG	Recruit ratings: Scout: Rivals: 247Sports: ESPN:				
Dion Wiley; SG	Oxon Hill, Maryland	Potomac High School	6 ft 2 in (1.88 m)	195 lb (88 kg)	Jun 7, 2013
Dion Wiley; SG	Recruit ratings: Scout: Rivals: 247Sports: ESPN:				
Trayvon Reed; C	Snellville, Georgia	Life Center Academy	7 ft 1 in (2.16 m)	210 lb (95 kg)	Aug 22, 2013
Trayvon Reed; C	Recruit ratings: Scout: Rivals: 247Sports: ESPN:				
Michal Cekovsky; C	Slovakia, Europe	Canarias Basketball Academy	7 ft 0 in (2.13 m)	225 lb (102 kg)	Apr 7, 2013
Michal Cekovsky; C	Recruit ratings: Scout: Rivals: 247Sports: ESPN:				
Jared Nickens; SG	Monmouth Junction, New Jersey	Westtown School	6 ft 6 in (1.98 m)	190 lb (86 kg)	Jun 16, 2013
Jared Nickens; SG	Recruit ratings: Scout: Rivals: 247Sports: ESPN:				
Overall recruit ranking:
Note: In many cases, Scout, Rivals, 247Sports, On3, and ESPN may conflict in their listings of height and weight.; In these cases, the average was taken. ESPN grades are on a 100-point scale.; Sources: "2014 Team Ranking". Rivals.

== Roster ==
Hometowns of team roster

2014–15 Maryland Terrapins men's basketball team
Players
Coaches

Pos.	#	Name	Height	Weight	Year	Hometown
PF	1	Evan Smotrycz	6 ft 9 in (2.06 m)	235 lb (107 kg)	RS Sr	Reading, Massachusetts
G	2	Melo Trimble	6 ft 2 in (1.88 m)	175 lb (79 kg)	Fr	Upper Marlboro, Maryland
PF	4	Robert Carter (redshirt)	6 ft 8 in (2.03 m)	250 lb (113 kg)	Jr	Thomasville, Georgia
G	5	Dion Wiley	6 ft 4 in (1.93 m)	195 lb (88 kg)	Fr	Oxon Hill, Maryland
F	10	Jake Layman	6 ft 9 in (2.06 m)	190 lb (86 kg)	Jr	Wrentham, Massachusetts
G/F	11	Jared Nickens	6 ft 6 in (1.98 m)	190 lb (86 kg)	Fr	Monmouth Junction, New Jersey
G	12	Trevor Anzmann (W)	5 ft 11 in (1.8 m)	170 lb (77 kg)	Sr	Westminster, Maryland
F	14	Spencer Barks (W)	6 ft 9 in (2.06 m)	225 lb (102 kg)	Sr	Poolesville, Maryland
C	15	Michal Čekovský	7 ft 0 in (2.13 m)	225 lb (102 kg)	Fr	Košice, Slovakia
G	20	Richaud Pack	6 ft 3 in (1.91 m)	185 lb (84 kg)	Sr	Detroit, Michigan
G	21	Varun Ram (W)	5 ft 9 in (1.75 m)	150 lb (68 kg)	Sr	Clarksville, Maryland
G	24	Jacob Susskind (W)	6 ft 5 in (1.96 m)	205 lb (93 kg)	Sr	West Orange, New Jersey
PF	25	Jonathan Graham	6 ft 7 in (2.01 m)	220 lb (100 kg)	Sr	Baltimore, Maryland
C	35	Damonte Dodd	6 ft 10 in (2.08 m)	240 lb (109 kg)	So	Centreville, Maryland
G/F	44	Dez Wells	6 ft 4 in (1.93 m)	215 lb (98 kg)	Sr	Raleigh, North Carolina

Head coach

- Mark Turgeon (Kansas)

Assistant coach(es)

- Dustin Clark (Texas A&M)
- Bino Ranson (SNHU)
- Cliff Warren (Mount St. Mary's)

Legend

- (C) Team captain
- (S) Suspended
- (I) Ineligible
- (W) Walk-on
- Injured
- Current redshirt

Roster

=== Depth chart ===
Pos.	Starting 5	Bench 1	Bench 2
C	Damonte Dodd	Jonathan Graham	Michal Čekovský
PF	Jake Layman	Evan Smotrycz
SF	Dez Wells	Dion Wiley	Spencer Barks
SG	Richaud Pack	Jared Nickens	Jacob Susskind
PG	Melo Trimble	Varun Ram	Trevor Anzmann

== Accolades ==
Jake Layman

- Second Team All-Big Ten (coaches)
- Third Team All-Big Ten (media)

Varun Ram

- Big Ten Medal of Honor

Melo Trimble

- First Team All-Big Ten (media)
- Second Team All-Big Ten (coaches)
- Big Ten All-Freshman Team
- USBWA Freshman All-American
- ECAC Rookie of the Year

Dez Wells

- First Team All-Big Ten (coaches)
- Second Team All-Big Ten (media)

Mark Turgeon

- Big Ten Coach of the Year (media)

== Schedule and results ==
Date time, TV	Rank^{#}	Opponent^{#}	Result	Record	High points	High rebounds	High assists	Site (attendance) city, state
Exhibition
Nov 1*; 2:00 pm		San Francisco State	W 86–52		19 – Trimble	6 – Tied	5 – Tied	Xfinity Center; College Park, MD
Nov 8*; 12:00 pm		Bowie State	W 89–47		18 – Layman	11 – Graham	5 – Trimble	Xfinity Center; College Park, MD
Non-conference regular season
Nov 14*; 7:30 pm, ESPN3		Wagner	W 82–48	1–0	18 – Wells	9 – Layman	6 – Layman	Xfinity Center (10,015); College Park, MD
Nov 17*; 7:30 pm, ESPN3		Central Connecticut; CBE Hall of Fame Classic	W 93–57	2–0	27 – Wells	9 – Trimble	4 – Tied	Xfinity Center (8,612); College Park, MD
Nov 20*; 7:30 pm		Fordham	W 66–50	3–0	13 – Nickens	8 – Pack	4 – Pack	Xfinity Center (9,022); College Park, MD
Nov 24*; 7:00 pm, ESPNU		vs. Arizona State; CBE Hall of Fame Classic Semifinals	W 78–73	4–0	31 – Trimble	8 – Wells	4 – Wells	Sprint Center (N/A); Kansas City, MO
Nov 25*; 9:30 pm, ESPNU		vs. No. 13 Iowa State; CBE Hall of Fame Classic Championship	W 72–63	5–0	15 – Tied	9 – Wells	4 – Wells	Sprint Center (N/A); Kansas City, MO
Nov 28*; 7:00 pm, BTN		Monmouth; CBE Hall of Fame Classic	W 61–56	6–0	24 – Trimble	6 – Smotrycz	3 – Trimble	Xfinity Center (9,139); College Park, MD
Nov 30*; 6:00 pm, ESPN3		VMI	W 95–77	7–0	22 – Pack	9 – Layman	4 – Trimble	Xfinity Center (8,896); College Park, MD
Dec 3*; 9:15 pm, ESPN2	No. 21	No. 7 Virginia; ACC–Big Ten Challenge	L 65–76	7–1	16 – Trimble	5 – Layman	2 – Trimble	Xfinity Center (15,371); College Park, MD
Dec 6*; 2:00 pm, ESPN3	No. 21	Winthrop	W 82–62	8–1	21 – Layman	10 – Dodd	7 – Trimble	Xfinity Center (9,345); College Park, MD
Dec 10*; 7:00 pm, BTN	No. 19	North Carolina Central	W 67–56	9–1	17 – Pack	6 – Tied	4 – Tied	Xfinity Center (8,723); College Park, MD
Dec 13*; 11:00 am, BTN	No. 19	USC Upstate	W 67–57	10–1	17 – Layman	12 – Trimble	3 – Tied	Xfinity Center (9,093); College Park, MD
Dec 21*; 2:00 pm, ESPNU	No. 17	at Oklahoma State	W 73–64	11–1	21 – Layman	11 – Layman	4 – Trimble	Gallagher-Iba Arena (11,104); Stillwater, OK
Dec 27*; 5:00 pm, BTN	No. 15	Oakland	W 72–56	12–1	17 – Trimble	9 – Layman	4 – Wells	Xfinity Center (12,938); College Park, MD
Big Ten regular season
Dec 30; 5:00 pm, ESPN2	No. 12	at Michigan State	W 68–66 ^{2OT}	13–1 (1–0)	17 – Trimble	9 – Layman	5 – Wells	Breslin Center (14,797); East Lansing, MI
Jan 3; 12:00 pm, BTN	No. 12	Minnesota	W 70–58	14–1 (2–0)	20 – Trimble	12 – Dodd	4 – Wells	Xfinity Center (15,788); College Park, MD
Jan 7; 9:00 pm, BTN	No. 11	at Illinois	L 57–64	14–2 (2–1)	17 – Trimble	5 – Tied	4 – Trimble	State Farm Center (12,896); Champaign, IL
Jan 10; 2:30 pm, BTN	No. 11	at Purdue	W 69–60	15–2 (3–1)	14 – Layman	8 – Layman	4 – Wells	Mackey Arena (10,756); West Lafayette, IN
Jan 14; 7:00 pm, BTN	No. 14	Rutgers	W 73–65	16–2 (4–1)	17 – Wells	13 – Layman	4 – Trimble	Xfinity Center (12,419); College Park, MD
Jan 17; 4:00 pm, CBS	No. 14	Michigan State	W 75–59	17–2 (5–1)	24 – Trimble	12 – Layman	5 – Wells	Xfinity Center (17,950); College Park, MD
Jan 22; 9:00 pm, ESPNU	No. 13	at No. 23 Indiana	L 70–89	17–3 (5–2)	13 – Layman	6 – Graham	4 – Wells	Assembly Hall (17,472); Bloomington, IN
Jan 25; 7:30 pm, BTN	No. 13	Northwestern	W 68–67	18–3 (6–2)	27 – Trimble	8 – Layman	3 – Trimble	Xfinity Center (14,113); College Park, MD
Jan 29; 7:00 pm, ESPN	No. 16	at Ohio State	L 56–80	18–4 (6–3)	12 – Wells	6 – Layman	3 – Layman	Value City Arena (14,483); Columbus, OH
Feb 4; 8:30 pm, BTN	No. 17	Penn State	W 64–58	19–4 (7–3)	23 – Wells	9 – Layman	8 – Trimble	Xfinity Center (14,195); College Park, MD
Feb 8; 3:15 pm, BTN	No. 17	at Iowa	L 55–71	19–5 (7–4)	20 – Trimble	4 – Tied	4 – Wells	Carver–Hawkeye Arena (15,400); Iowa City, IA
Feb 11; 9:00 pm, BTN	No. 19	Indiana	W 68–66	20–5 (8–4)	18 – Tied	7 – Layman	2 – Tied	Xfinity Center (15,304); College Park, MD
Feb 14; 8:30 pm, BTN	No. 19	at Penn State	W 76–73	21–5 (9–4)	22 – Wells	6 – Tied	4 – Trimble	Bryce Jordan Center (8,303); University Park, PA
Feb 19; 7:00 pm, BTN	No. 16	Nebraska	W 69–65	22–5 (10–4)	26 – Trimble	6 – Trimble	5 – Trimble	Xfinity Center (14,376); College Park, MD
Feb 24; 7:00 pm, ESPN	No. 14	No. 5 Wisconsin	W 59–53	23–5 (11–4)	26 – Wells	7 – Wells	4 – Wells	Xfinity Center (17,950); College Park, MD
Feb 28; 12:00 pm, ESPN	No. 14	Michigan	W 66–56	24–5 (12–4)	19 – Trimble	9 – Smotrycz	5 – Trimble	Xfinity Center (17,950); College Park, MD
Mar 3; 7:00 pm, BTN	No. 10	at Rutgers	W 60–50	25–5 (13–4)	20 – Wells	10 – Wells	2 – Tied	The RAC (7,053); Piscataway, NJ
Mar 8; 7:30 pm, BTN	No. 10	at Nebraska	W 64–61	26–5 (14–4)	21 – Trimble	12 – Wells	4 – Tied	Pinnacle Bank Arena (15,856); Lincoln, NE
Big Ten tournament
Mar 13; 6:30 pm, BTN	(2) No. 8	vs. (7) Indiana; Quarterfinals	W 75–69	27–5	22 – Wells	9 – Layman	3 – Tied	United Center (17,230); Chicago, IL
Mar 14; 4:00 pm, CBS	(2) No. 8	vs. (3) Michigan State; Semifinals	L 58–62	27–6	22 – Trimble	7 – Wells	5 – Layman	United Center (18,088); Chicago, IL
NCAA tournament
Mar 20*; 4:40 pm, TNT	(4 MW) No. 12	vs. (13 MW) Valparaiso; Second round	W 65–62	28–6	14 – Tied	10 – Trimble	3 – Tied	Nationwide Arena (18,417); Columbus, OH
Mar 22*; 8:40 pm, TNT	(4 MW) No. 12	vs. (5 MW) No. 20 West Virginia; Third round	L 59–69	28–7	15 – Trimble	7 – Trimble	3 – Layman	Nationwide Arena (19,115); Columbus, OH
*Non-conference game. ^{#}Rankings from AP Poll. (#) Tournament seedings in parentheses. MW=Midwest Region. All times are in Eastern Time.

== Rankings ==
Ranking movement Legend: ██ Increase in ranking. ██ Decrease in ranking. (RV) Received votes but unranked. (NR) Not ranked.
Poll	Pre	Wk 2	Wk 3	Wk 4	Wk 5	Wk 6	Wk 7	Wk 8	Wk 9	Wk 10	Wk 11	Wk 12	Wk 13	Wk 14	Wk 15	Wk 16	Wk 17	Wk 18	Wk 19	Final
AP	RV	RV	RV	21	19	17	15	12	11	14	13	16	17	19	16	14	10	8	12	N/A
Coaches	NR	NR	NR	22	20	18	15	11	9	11	8	13	16	19	15	14	9	8	12	16

== See also ==
- 2014–15 Maryland Terrapins women's basketball team
