= 2014–15 Valparaiso Crusaders men's basketball team =

American college basketball season

2014–15 Valparaiso Crusaders men's basketball

Horizon League Regular Season & Tournament Champions

NCAA tournament, round of 64
- Conference: Horizon League
- Record: 28–6 (13–3 Horizon)
- Head coach: Bryce Drew (4th season)
- Assistant coaches: Roger Powell; Luke Gore; Matt Lottich
- Home arena: Athletics–Recreation Center

2014–15 Horizon League men's basketball standings
	Conf.				Overall
Team	W		L	PCT	W		L	PCT
Valparaiso †	13	–	3	.813	28	–	6	.824
Green Bay	12	–	4	.750	24	–	9	.727
Oakland	11	–	5	.688	16	–	17	.485
Cleveland State	11	–	5	.688	19	–	15	.559
Milwaukee *	9	–	7	.563	14	–	16	.467
Detroit	7	–	9	.438	15	–	18	.455
UIC	4	–	12	.250	10	–	24	.294
Wright State	3	–	13	.188	11	–	20	.355
Youngstown State	2	–	14	.125	11	–	21	.344
† 2015 Horizon League Tournament winner * Ineligible for postseason play due to APR penalties

The 2014–15 Valparaiso Crusaders men's basketball team represented Valparaiso University during the 2014–15 NCAA Division I men's basketball season. The Crusaders, led by fourth year head coach Bryce Drew, played their home games at the Athletics–Recreation Center and were members of the Horizon League. Valpo finished the season 28–6, 13–3 in Horizon League play to win the Horizon League regular season championship. The Crusaders defeated Cleveland State and Green Bay to win the Horizon League tournament championship. Valpo received an automatic bid to the NCAA tournament as a #13 seed and lost in the second round to Maryland.

Senior center Vashil Fernandez was the league's Defensive Player of the Year, and sophomore forward Jubril Adekoya was the Sixth Man of the Year. Bryce Drew was named the league's Coach of the Year.

== Previous season ==
The Crusaders finished the 2013–14 season with an overall record of 18–16, 9–7 in Horizon League play to finish in fourth place. Valpo advanced to the second round of the Horizon League tournament where they lost to Milwaukee. The Crusaders were invited to the CollegeInsider.com Tournament where they lost in the first round to Columbia.

== Roster ==
2014–15 Valparaiso Crusaders men's basketball team
Players
Coaches

Pos.	#	Name	Height	Weight	Year	Hometown
G	0	Keith Carter	6 ft 1 in (1.85 m)	185 lb (84 kg)	Jr	Maywood, Illinois
G/F	1	E. Victor Nickerson	6 ft 8 in (2.03 m)	185 lb (84 kg)	Jr	Atlanta, GA
G	2	Tevonn Walker	6 ft 1 in (1.85 m)	195 lb (88 kg)	Fr	Montreal, Quebec, Canada
G	3	Max Joseph	6 ft 1 in (1.85 m)	205 lb (93 kg)	Fr	Montreal, Quebec, Canada
F	5	Darien Walker	6 ft 3 in (1.91 m)	215 lb (98 kg)	Jr	Chicago, IL
F	10	David Skara	6 ft 8 in (2.03 m)	215 lb (98 kg)	Fr	Zadar, Croatia
G	11	Shane Hammink	6 ft 7 in (2.01 m)	210 lb (95 kg)	Jr	Millingen aan de Rijn, Netherlands
F	14	Vashil Fernandez	6 ft 10 in (2.08 m)	245 lb (111 kg)	Sr	Kingston, Jamaica
G	15	Lexus Williams	6 ft 0 in (1.83 m)	160 lb (73 kg)	Fr	Chicago, IL
G	22	Nick Davidson	6 ft 4 in (1.93 m)	195 lb (88 kg)	So	Munster, Indiana
F	23	Jubril Adekoya	6 ft 7 in (2.01 m)	230 lb (104 kg)	So	Tinley Park, Illinois
F	25	Alec Peters	6 ft 9 in (2.06 m)	225 lb (102 kg)	So	Washington, Illinois
F	32	David Chadwick	6 ft 9 in (2.06 m)	220 lb (100 kg)	Sr	Charlotte, North Carolina
F		Chandler Levingston Simon	6 ft 7 in (2.01 m)	220 lb (100 kg)	So	Vernon Hills, Illinois

Head coach

- Bryce Drew (Valparaiso)

Assistant coach(es)

- Roger Powell, Jr. (Illinois)
- Luke Gore (Bethel (IN))
- Matt Lottich (Stanford)

Legend

- (C) Team captain
- (S) Suspended
- (I) Ineligible
- (W) Walk-on
- Injured
- Current redshirt

Roster
Last update: 2014–11–05

== Schedule ==
The 2014–2015 Valparaiso University men's basketball schedule is:

Date time, TV	Rank^{#}	Opponent^{#}	Result	Record	Site (attendance) city, state
Exhibition
11/06/2014*; 7:00 pm		Grand Valley State	W 60–52	–	Athletics–Recreation Center (2,087); Valparaiso, IN
Regular season
11/14/2014*; 7:30 pm		East Tennessee State	W 90–76	1–0	Athletics–Recreation Center (2,912); Valparaíso, Indiana
11/16/2014*; 5:00 pm, SECN		at Missouri	L 41–56	1–1	Mizzou Arena (5,369); Columbia, Missouri
11/19/2014*; 7:00 pm		IU South Bend	W 91–55	2–1	Athletics–Recreation Center (2,051); Valparaiso, IN
11/21/2014*; 3:30 pm		vs. Arkansas–Pine Bluff; Central Michigan Tournament	W 62–43	3–1	McGuirk Arena (2,115); Mount Pleasant, Michigan
11/23/2014*; 8:45 am		vs. Maine; Central Michigan Tournament	W 93–70	4–1	McGuirk Arena (1,556); Mount Pleasant, Michigan
11/28/2014*; 5:00 pm		vs. Drake; Challenge in Music City	W 66–46	5–1	Nashville Municipal Auditorium (N/A); Nashville, Tennessee
11/29/2014*; 7:30 pm		vs. Murray State; Challenge in Music City	W 93–58	6–1	Nashville Municipal Auditorium (N/A); Nashville, Tennessee
11/30/2014*; 1:00 pm		vs. Portland; Challenge in Music City	W 70–55	7–1	Nashville Municipal Auditorium (239); Nashville, Tennessee
12/03/2014*; 6:00 pm		at Eastern Kentucky	W 72–66	8–1	McBrayer Arena (2,600); Richmond, Kentucky
12/06/2014*; 7:00 pm, ESPN3		New Mexico	L 46–63	8–2	Athletics–Recreation Center (4,227); Valparaiso, IN
12/10/2014*; 7:00 pm		Trinity International	W 79–54	9–2	Athletics–Recreation Center (1,044); Valparaiso, IN
12/13/2014*; 7:00 pm, ESPN3		Ball State	W 65–62	10–2	Athletics–Recreation Center (3,752); Valparaiso, IN
12/20/2014*; 6:00 pm		at IPFW	W 75–72	11–2	Gates Sports Center (1,249); Fort Wayne, Indiana
12/21/2014*; 1:30 pm		Goshen	W 82–55	12–2	Athletics–Recreation Center (1,014); Valparaiso, IN
12/29/2014*; 6:00 pm		at James Madison	W 79–52	13–2	JMU Convocation Center (2,757); Harrisonburg, Virginia
01/02/2015; 6:00 pm		at Oakland	L 75–89 ^{OT}	13–3 (0–1)	Athletics Center O'rena (2,873); Rochester, Michigan
01/04/2015; 1:30 pm		Youngstown State	W 79–64	14–3 (1–1)	Athletics–Recreation Center (1,988); Valparaiso, IN
01/08/2015; 7:00 pm, ESPN3		UIC	W 85–56	15–3 (2–1)	Athletics–Recreation Center (1,863); Valparaiso, IN
01/10/2015; 7:00 pm, ESPN3		Cleveland State	W 58–56	16–3 (3–1)	Athletics–Recreation Center (4,155); Valparaiso, IN
01/17/2015; 6:00 pm, ESPN3		at Wright State	W 66–56	17–3 (4–1)	Nutter Center (7,664); Fairborn, Ohio
01/20/2015; 6:00 pm		at Youngstown State	W 77–62	18–3 (5–1)	Beeghly Center (1,719); Youngstown, Ohio
01/23/2015; 8:00 pm, ESPNU		at Green Bay	L 50–51	18–4 (5–2)	Resch Center (4,916); Green Bay, Wisconsin
01/26/2015; 7:00 pm, ESPN3		Milwaukee	W 73–48	19–4 (6–2)	Athletics–Recreation Center (2,137); Valparaiso, IN
01/31/2015; 2:00 pm, ASN		at UIC	W 70–65	20–4 (7–2)	UIC Pavilion (5,731); Chicago
02/04/2015; 7:00 pm		Detroit	W 78–70	21–4 (8–2)	Athletics–Recreation Center (1,905); Valparaiso, IN
02/08/2015; 2:00 pm, ASN		Oakland	W 82–76	22–4 (9–2)	Athletics–Recreation Center (4,267); Valparaiso, IN
02/13/2015; 6:00 pm, ESPN2		Green Bay	W 63–59	23–4 (10–2)	Athletics–Recreation Center (4,920); Valparaiso, IN
02/15/2015; 1:00 pm, ESPN3		at Milwaukee	W 62–55	24–4 (11–2)	UW–Milwaukee Panther Arena (3,375); Milwaukee
02/21/2015; 7:00 pm, ESPN3		Wright State	W 55–48	25–4 (12–2)	Athletics–Recreation Center (5,050); Valparaiso, IN
02/25/2015; 6:00 pm, ESPN3		at Detroit	L 60–63	25–5 (12–3)	Calihan Hall (1,855); Detroit
02/27/2015; 9:00 pm, ESPNU		at Cleveland State	W 56–53	26–5 (13–3)	Wolstein Center (4,133); Cleveland, Ohio
Horizon League tournament
03/07/2015; 8:30 pm, ESPNU		Cleveland State; Semifinals	W 60–55	27–5	Athletics–Recreation Center (3,629); Valparaiso, IN
03/10/2015; 6:00 pm, ESPN		Green Bay; Championship game	W 54–44	28–5	Athletics–Recreation Center (4,713); Valparaiso, IN
NCAA tournament
03/20/2015*; 3:40 pm, TNT	No. (13 MW)	vs. No. 12 (4 MW) Maryland; Second round	L 62–65	28–6	Nationwide Arena (18,417); Columbus, Ohio
*Non-conference game. ^{#}Rankings from AP Poll. (#) Tournament seedings in parentheses. All times are in Central Time. (#) during NCAA Tournament is seed with Region MW=Midwest.
