= 2014–15 UIC Flames men's basketball team =

American college basketball season

2014–15 UIC Flames men's basketball
- Conference: Horizon League
- Record: 10–24 (4–12 Horizon)
- Head coach: Howard Moore (5th season)
- Assistant coaches: Stew Robinson; Deon Thomas; Jeremy Buttell
- Home arena: UIC Pavilion

2014–15 Horizon League men's basketball standings
	Conf.				Overall
Team	W		L	PCT	W		L	PCT
Valparaiso †	13	–	3	.813	28	–	6	.824
Green Bay	12	–	4	.750	24	–	9	.727
Oakland	11	–	5	.688	16	–	17	.485
Cleveland State	11	–	5	.688	19	–	15	.559
Milwaukee *	9	–	7	.563	14	–	16	.467
Detroit	7	–	9	.438	15	–	18	.455
UIC	4	–	12	.250	10	–	24	.294
Wright State	3	–	13	.188	11	–	20	.355
Youngstown State	2	–	14	.125	11	–	21	.344
† 2015 Horizon League Tournament winner * Ineligible for postseason play due to APR penalties

The 2014–15 UIC Flames men's basketball team represented the University of Illinois at Chicago in the 2014–15 NCAA Division I men's basketball season. Their head coach was Howard Moore, serving his fifth year. The Flames played their home games at the UIC Pavilion and were members of the Horizon League. They finished the season 10–24, 4–12 in Horizon League play to finish in seventh place. They defeated Wright State and Oakland to advance to the semifinals of the Horizon League tournament where they lost to Green Bay.

On March 10, head coach Howard Moore was fired. He finished at UIC with a five-year record of 49–111.

== Roster ==
2014–15 UIC Flames men's basketball team
Players
Coaches

Pos.	#	Name	Height	Weight	Year	Hometown
G	0	D'Juan WMiller	5 ft 8 in (1.73 m)	170 lb (77 kg)	Jr	Kent, Washington
G	1	Marcus White	5 ft 9 in (1.75 m)	155 lb (70 kg)	So	Chicago, IL
G	2	Gabe Snider	6 ft 4 in (1.93 m)	185 lb (84 kg)	Jr	Chicago, IL
G	4	Lance Whitaker	6 ft 4 in (1.93 m)	200 lb (91 kg)	RS Fr	Bartlett, IL
G/F	10	Marc Brown	6 ft 4 in (1.93 m)	200 lb (91 kg)	Sr	Dallas, TX
G	11	Paris Burns	5 ft 11 in (1.8 m)	165 lb (75 kg)	Jr	Chicago, IL
F	14	David Ramon	6 ft 7 in (2.01 m)	205 lb (93 kg)	Fr	Madrid, Spain
F	20	Jason McClellan	6 ft 9 in (2.06 m)	240 lb (109 kg)	Jr	Fort Collins, CO
F/C	21	Tai Odiase	6 ft 9 in (2.06 m)	210 lb (95 kg)	Fr	Flossmoor, IL
G	22	Jay Harris	6 ft 1 in (1.85 m)	170 lb (77 kg)	Sr	Aurora, IL
G	23	Jay Parker	5 ft 10 in (1.78 m)	170 lb (77 kg)	Sr	Harvey, IL
F	32	Hans-Christian Lauer	6 ft 7 in (2.01 m)	210 lb (95 kg)		Klein-Winternheim, Germany
F	33	Ahman Fells	6 ft 5 in (1.96 m)	190 lb (86 kg)	Sr	Chicago, IL
G	34	Markese McGuire	6 ft 5 in (1.96 m)	200 lb (91 kg)	So	Elkhart, IN
F	40	Jake Wiegand	6 ft 8 in (2.03 m)	235 lb (107 kg)	Jr	Herndon, VA

Head coach

- Howard Moore (Wisconsin)

Assistant coach(es)

- Stew Robinson (Indiana)
- Deon Thomas (Illinois)
- Jeremy Buttell (UIC)

Legend

- (C) Team captain
- (S) Suspended
- (I) Ineligible
- (W) Walk-on
- Injured
- Current redshirt

Roster
Last update: 2014–11–05

== Schedule ==
Date time, TV	Opponent	Result	Record	Site (attendance) city, state
Exhibition
11/06/2014*; 7:00 pm, ESPN3	Beloit	W 70–54		UIC Pavilion (610); Chicago, IL
Regular season
11/14/2014*; 9:00 pm, FS2	at DePaul	L 71–72	0–1	McGrath–Phillips Arena (3,501); Chicago, IL
11/17/2014*; 3:00 pm, ESPN3	Western Illinois	W 67–64	1–1	UIC Pavilion (5,575); Chicago, IL
11/21/2014*; 4:00 pm	vs. Yale; Men Against Breast Cancer Classic	L 58–70	1–2	MAC Center (173); Kent, OH
11/22/2014*; 6:30 pm	at Kent State; Men Against Breast Cancer Classic	L 60–78	1–3	MAC Center (2,816); Kent, OH
11/23/2014*; 12:00 pm	vs. Southern Illinois; Men Against Breast Cancer Classic	L 60–67	1–4	MAC Center (233); Kent, OH
11/25/2014*; 7:00 pm	Saint Xavier; Men Against Breast Cancer Classic	W 87–76	2–4	UIC Pavilion (2,014); Chicago, IL
11/29/2014*; 1:00 pm, FS Ohio	at Dayton	L 41–75	2–5	UD Arena (11,835); Dayton, OH
12/02/2014*; 7:00 pm, ESPN3	Grand Canyon	L 61–66	2–6	UIC Pavilion (1,731); Chicago, IL
12/06/2014*; 1:00 pm, ESPN3	Loyola–Chicago	L 67–77	2–7	UIC Pavilion (5,449); Chicago, IL
12/11/2014*; 7:00 pm, ESPN3	UCF	W 71–60	3–7	UIC Pavilion (2,308); Chicago, IL
12/15/2014*; 7:00 pm, ESPN3	UT Martin	L 78–81 ^{OT}	3–8	UIC Pavilion (1,599); Chicago, IL
12/17/2014*; 7:00 pm, CBSSN	at SMU	L 46–67	3–9	Moody Coliseum (6,852); University Park, TX
12/22/2014*; 1:00 pm, ESPN3	at Northwestern	L 46–63	3–10	Welsh-Ryan Arena (6,503); Evanston, IL
12/28/2014*; 4:00 pm	at Bradley	L 60–68	3–11	Carver Arena (5,343); Peoria, IL
12/30/2014*; 7:00 pm	Judson	W 79–38	4–11	UIC Pavilion (3,106); Chicago, IL
01/02/2015; 3:00 pm	Youngstown State	W 77–71	5–11 (1–0)	UIC Pavilion (3,027); Chicago, IL
01/04/2015; 3:00 pm, STO	Cleveland State	L 69–74	5–12 (1–1)	UIC Pavilion (717); Chicago, IL
01/08/2015; 7:00 pm, ESPN3	at Valparaiso	L 56–84	5–13 (1–2)	Athletics–Recreation Center (1,863); Valparaiso, IN
01/14/2015; 7:00 pm, ESPN3	Detroit	L 68–69	5–14 (1–3)	UIC Pavilion (3,001); Chicago, IL
01/20/2015; 7:00 pm	at Green Bay	L 55–78	5–15 (1–4)	Resch Center (2,914); Green Bay, WI
01/24/2015; 6:00 pm, ESPN3	at Youngstown State	L 64–77	5–16 (1–5)	Beeghly Center (2,828); Youngstown, OH
01/29/2015; 7:00 pm, ESPN3	at Milwaukee	L 65–71	5–17 (1–6)	UW–Milwaukee Panther Arena (3,009); Milwaukee, WI
01/31/2015; 2:00 pm	Valparaiso	L 65–70	5–18 (1–7)	UIC Pavilion (5,731); Chicago, IL
02/04/2015; 7:00 pm, ESPN3	Oakland	L 77–91	5–19 (1–8)	UIC Pavilion (2,121); Chicago, IL
02/08/2015; 1:00 pm, ESPN3	at Detroit	W 83–73	6–19 (2–8)	Calihan Hall (2,345); Detroit, MI
02/12/2015; 6:00 pm, ESPN3	at Wright State	W 79–75	7–19 (3–8)	Nutter Center (4,216); Fairborn, OH
02/15/2015; 2:00 pm	at Cleveland State	L 59–67	7–20 (3–9)	Wolstein Center (2,471); Cleveland, OH
02/19/2015; 7:00 pm, ESPN3	Milwaukee	L 60–71	7–21 (3–10)	UIC Pavilion (2,591); Chicago, IL
02/22/2015; 2:00 pm, ESPN3	at Oakland	L 56–81	7–22 (3–11)	Athletics Center O'rena (3,781); Rochester, MI
02/26/2015; 7:00 pm, ESPN3	Green Bay	L 67–72	7–23 (3–12)	UIC Pavilion (2,768); Chicago, IL
02/28/2015; 1:00 pm, ESPN3	Wright State	W 61–46	8–23 (4–12)	UIC Pavilion (3,266); Chicago, IL
Horizon League tournament
03/03/2015; 7:00 pm, ESPN3	Wright State; First round	W 60–57	9–23	UIC Pavilion (1,611); Chicago, IL
03/06/2015; 6:00 pm, ESPN3	vs. Oakland; Quarterfinals	W 72–69	10–23	Athletics–Recreation Center (2,341); Valparaiso, IN
03/07/2015; 6:00 pm, ESPN3/ESPNU (Delayed on U)	vs. Green Bay; Semifinals	L 56–70	10–24	Athletics–Recreation Center (3,629); Valparaiso, IN
*Non-conference game. ^{#}Rankings from AP Poll. (#) Tournament seedings in parentheses. All times are in Central Time.
