= 2014–15 Wright State Raiders men's basketball team =

American college basketball season

2014–15 Wright State Raiders men's basketball
- Conference: Horizon League
- Record: 11–20 (3–13 Horizon)
- Head coach: Billy Donlon (5th season)
- Assistant coaches: Chris Moore; Scott Woods; Brandon Mullins
- Home arena: Nutter Center

2014–15 Horizon League men's basketball standings
	Conf.				Overall
Team	W		L	PCT	W		L	PCT
Valparaiso †	13	–	3	.813	28	–	6	.824
Green Bay	12	–	4	.750	24	–	9	.727
Oakland	11	–	5	.688	16	–	17	.485
Cleveland State	11	–	5	.688	19	–	15	.559
Milwaukee *	9	–	7	.563	14	–	16	.467
Detroit	7	–	9	.438	15	–	18	.455
UIC	4	–	12	.250	10	–	24	.294
Wright State	3	–	13	.188	11	–	20	.355
Youngstown State	2	–	14	.125	11	–	21	.344
† 2015 Horizon League Tournament winner * Ineligible for postseason play due to APR penalties

The 2014–15 Wright State Raiders men's basketball team represented Wright State University during the 2014–15 NCAA Division I men's basketball season. The Raiders, led by fifth year head coach Billy Donlon, played their home games at the Nutter Center and were members of the Horizon League. They finished the season 11–20, 3–13 in Horizon League play to finish in eighth place. They lost in the first round of the Horizon League tournament to UIC.

== Roster ==
Number	Name	Position	Height	Weight	Year	Hometown
0	Steven Davis	Forward	6–7	200	Sophomore	Indianapolis, Indiana
2	Daniel Collie	Guard	5–11	175	Junior	Parkersburg, West Virginia
3	Reggie Arceneaux	Guard	5–9	160	Senior	New Orleans, Louisiana
5	Justin Mitchell	Guard	6–4	180	Freshman	Fort Wayne, Indiana
10	Mark Howell	Guard	5–10	170	Sophomore	Grand Prairie, Texas
11	JT Yoho	Forward	6–6	225	Junior	Bloomfield, Indiana
12	Grant Evans	Guard	6–3	185	Freshman	Selma, Indiana
13	Grant Benzinger	Guard	6–3	190	Freshman	Cincinnati, Ohio
14	Michael Karena	Center	6–10	255	Junior	Christchurch, New Zealand
15	Kendall Griffin	Guard	6–4	215	Senior	Avon, Indiana
20	Chrishawn Hopkins	Guard	6–2	175	Senior	Indianapolis, Indiana
21	Trey Stacey	Guard	6–2	185	Freshman	Cincinnati, Ohio
32	Joe Thomasson	Guard	6–4	170	Junior	Dayton, Ohio
35	Roderick Davis	Forward	6–8	225	Freshman	Brandon, Florida
	Mark Alstork	Guard	6–4	195	Sophomore	Dayton, Ohio
	Parker Ernsthausen	Forward	6–9	210	Freshman	Bowling Green, Ohio
	Zach Lett	Center	6–9	240	Freshman	Richmond, Indiana

== Schedule ==
Date time, TV	Opponent	Result	Record	Site (attendance) city, state
Exhibition
11/05/2014*; 7:00 pm	Findlay	W 68–59		Nutter Center (3,472); Fairborn, OH
Regular season
11/14/2014*; 7:00 pm, ESPN3	Belmont	W 73–70	1–0	Nutter Center (5,437); Fairborn, OH
11/16/2014*; 5:00 pm, ESPN3	Ohio Dominican	W 76–64	2–0	Nutter Center (3,668); Fairborn, OH
11/19/2014*; 4:00 pm	at Bowling Green	L 55–70	2–1	Stroh Center (1,441); Bowling Green, OH
11/22/2014*; 5:30 pm	at Charleston Southern	W 86–79	3–1	CSU Field House (923); Charleston, SC
11/27/2014*; 6:00 pm, ESPN3	vs. Cal State Fullerton; USC Upstate Tournament	L 62–67	3–2	Hodge Center (255); Spartanburg, SC
11/28/2014*; 1:00 pm, ESPN3	vs. FIU; USC Upstate Tournament	L 59–61	3–3	Hodge Center (374); Spartanburg, SC
11/29/2014*; 6:00 pm, ESPN3	at USC Upstate; USC Upstate Tournament	W 56–51	4–3	Hodge Center (629); Spartanburg, SC
12/02/2014*; 8:00 pm	at Evansville	L 78–86	4–4	Ford Center (3,291); Evansville, IN
12/07/2014*; 7:00 pm, ESPN3	Urbana	W 81–58	5–4	Nutter Center (3,342); Fairborn, OH
12/11/2014*; 7:00 pm	at Belmont	W 79–71	6–4	Curb Event Center (1,234); Nashville, TN
12/14/2014*; 7:00 pm, ASN	Miami (OH)	W 68–59	7–4	Nutter Center (3,752); Fairborn, OH
12/18/2014*; 7:00 pm, ESPN3	at Western Carolina	W 69–56	8–4	Ramsey Center (671); Cullowhee, NC
12/23/2014*; 7:00 pm, ESPN3	George Mason	L 60–68	8–5	Nutter Center (4,685); Fairborn, OH
12/27/2014*; 7:00 pm, BTN	at No. 21 Ohio State	L 55–100	8–6	Value City Arena (15,874); Columbus, OH
01/02/2015; 7:00 pm, ESPN3	Detroit	W 70–57	9–6 (1–0)	Nutter Center (4,755); Fairborn, OH
01/05/2015; 8:00 pm, ESPN3	at Green Bay	L 55–79	9–7 (1–1)	Resch Center (2,814); Green Bay, WI
01/08/2015; 7:00 pm, ESPN3	at Youngstown State	W 70–61	10–7 (2–1)	Beeghly Center (1,215); Youngstown, OH
01/14/2015; 7:00 pm, ESPN3	Cleveland State	L 50–55	10–8 (2–2)	Nutter Center (4,891); Fairborn, OH
01/17/2015; 7:00 pm, ESPN3	Valparaiso	L 56–66	10–9 (2–3)	Nutter Center (7,664); Fairborn, OH
01/20/2015; 8:00 pm, ESPN3	at Milwaukee	L 41–67	10–10 (2–4)	UW–Milwaukee Panther Arena (2,040); Milwaukee, WI
01/26/2015; 7:00 pm, ESPN3	at Detroit	W 64–53	11–10 (3–4)	Calihan Hall (1,786); Detroit, MI
01/28/2015; 7:00 pm, ESPN3	at Oakland	L 76–84 ^{OT}	11–11 (3–5)	Athletics Center O'rena (2,872); Rochester, MI
02/02/2015; 8:00 pm, ASN	Green Bay	L 58–71	11–12 (3–6)	Nutter Center (3,590); Fairborn, OH
02/07/2015; 2:00 pm, ESPN3	at Cleveland State	L 72–88	11–13 (3–7)	Wolstein Center (2,733); Cleveland, OH
02/12/2015; 7:00 pm, ESPN3	UIC	L 75–79	11–14 (3–8)	Nutter Center (4,216); Fairborn, OH
02/15/2015; 3:00 pm, ESPN3	Youngstown State	L 69–74	11–15 (3–9)	Nutter Center (5,005); Fairborn, OH
02/18/2015; 7:00 pm, ESPN3	Oakland	L 67–76	11–16 (3–10)	Nutter Center (3,738); Fairborn, OH
02/21/2015; 8:00 pm, ESPN3	at Valparaiso	L 48–55	11–17 (3–11)	Athletics–Recreation Center (5,050); Valparaiso, IN
02/26/2015; 7:00 pm, ESPN3	Milwaukee	L 58–61	11–18 (3–12)	Nutter Center (3,888); Fairborn, OH
02/28/2015; 2:00 pm, ESPN3	at UIC	L 46–61	11–19 (3–13)	UIC Pavilion (3,266); Chicago, IL
Horizon League tournament
03/03/2015; 7:00 pm, ESPN3	at UIC; First round	L 57–60	11–20	UIC Pavilion (1,611); Chicago, IL
*Non-conference game. ^{#}Rankings from AP Poll. (#) Tournament seedings in parentheses. All times are in Eastern Time.

== Awards and honors ==
Kendall Griffin	Kendall Griffin Raider Award
Grant Benzinger	Horizon League All Newcomer Team

== Statistics ==
Number	Name	Games	Average	Points	Assists	Rebounds
13	Grant Benzinger	31	9.1	282	22	90
32	Joe Thomasson	28	10.0	280	90	153
14	Michael Karena	31	9.0	278	16	113
11	JT Yoho	16	15.6	250	33	103
20	Chrishawn Hopkins	29	8.5	247	81	86
3	Reggie Arceneaux	31	7.3	227	66	50
5	Justin Mitchell	28	4.5	127	32	80
00	Stephen Davis	14	7.1	100	10	46
15	Kendall Griffin	8	8.4	67	12	20
35	Roderick Davis	8	1.7	47	4	38
12	Grant Evans	21	1.8	38	15	18
10	Mark Howell	26	1.5	38	20	12
02	Daniel Collie	10	0.5	5	6	5
21	Trey Stacey	6	0.5	3	0	0
