= Alec Peters =

American basketball player (born 1995)

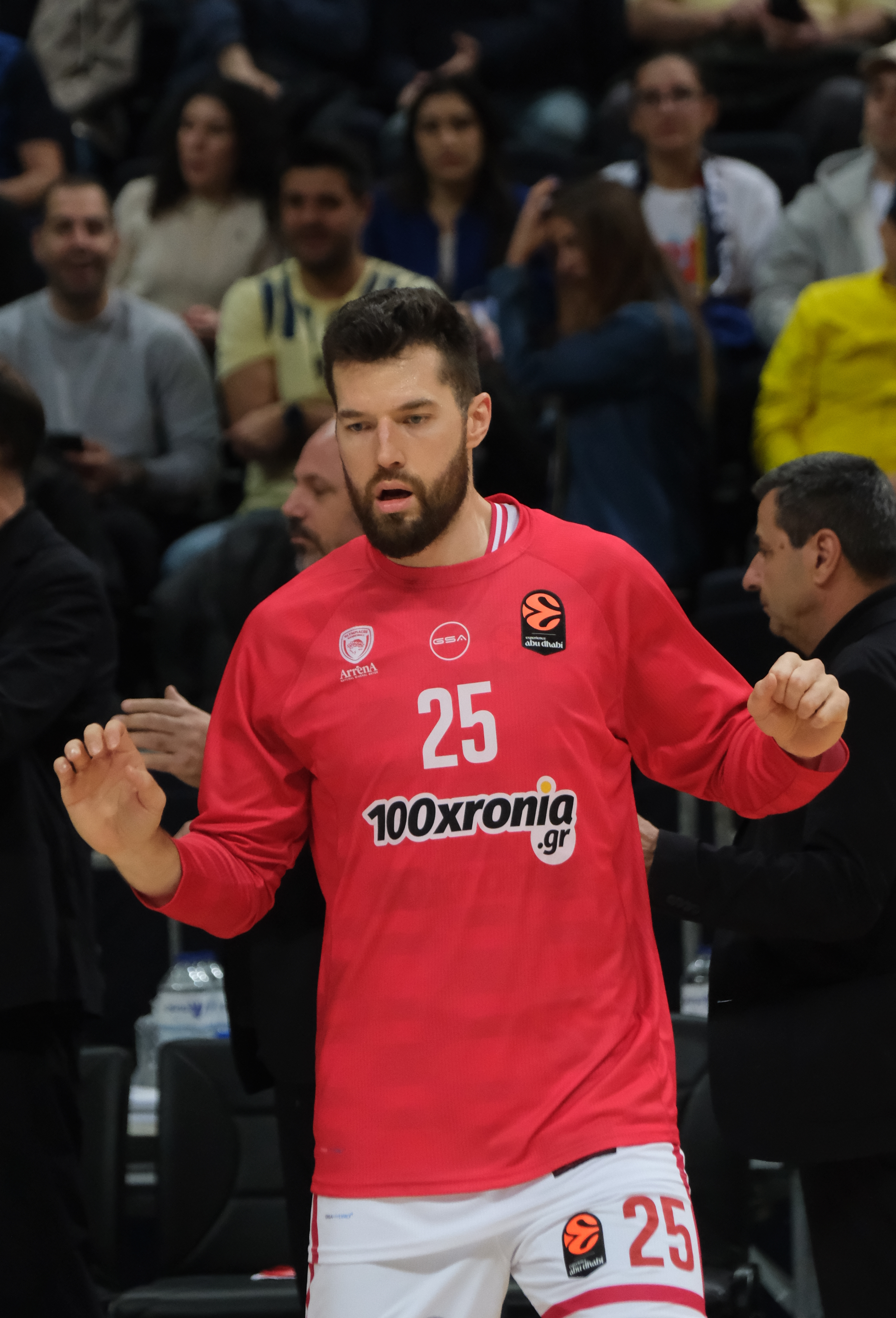
- Peters with Olympiacos in 2026

No. 25 – Olimpia Milano
- Position: Power forward / small forward
- League: LBA; EuroLeague

Personal information
- Born: April 13, 1995 (age 31) Washington, Illinois, U.S.
- Listed height: 2.05 m (6 ft 9 in)
- Listed weight: 235 lb (107 kg)

Career information
- High school: Washington (Washington, Illinois)
- College: Valparaiso (2013–2017)
- NBA draft: 2017: 2nd round, 54th overall pick
- Drafted by: Phoenix Suns
- Playing career: 2017–present

Career history
- 2017–2018: Phoenix Suns
- 2017–2018: →Northern Arizona Suns
- 2018–2019: CSKA Moscow
- 2019–2020: Anadolu Efes
- 2020–2022: Baskonia
- 2022–2026: Olympiacos
- 2026–present: Olimpia Milano

Career highlights
- 2× EuroLeague champion (2019, 2026); Italian Supercup winner (2026); 3× Greek League champion (2023, 2025, 2026); VTB United League champion (2019); 2× Greek Cup winner (2023, 2024); 4× Greek Super Cup winner (2022–2025); Turkish Super Cup winner (2019); All-Greek League Team (2024); Third-team All-American – NABC (2017); 2× AP Honorable Mention All-American (2016, 2017); Horizon League Player of the Year (2017); 3× First-team All-Horizon League (2015–2017); Horizon League tournament MVP (2015)
- Stats at NBA.com
- Stats at Basketball Reference

Alec Jeffrey Peters (born April 13, 1995) is an American-born naturalized Bosnian professional basketball player for Olimpia Milano of the Lega Basket Serie A (LBA) and the EuroLeague. He played college basketball for Valparaiso University, where he was an All-American in 2017.

== High school career ==
A 6'9" small forward from Washington, Illinois, Peters was a first-team all-state selection in his final two seasons at Washington Community High School. He selected Valparaiso over larger-conference schools such as Boston College, Missouri and Tennessee.

== College career ==
He immediately became the focus of the team's offense as a freshman, having an eventful season in adjusting to opponent defensive attention and the distraction of serious storms causing destruction in his hometown. As a sophomore, Peters settled into a starring role, averaging 16.8 points and 6.7 rebounds per game. At the conclusion of the season, he was named first-team All-Horizon League. In the 2015 Horizon League tournament, Peters was named tournament MVP in leading the Crusaders to the NCAA tournament.

In his junior season, Peters gained more of a national reputation. He averaged 18.4 points and 8.4 rebounds per game and led the Crusaders to the 2016 National Invitation Tournament final, where they lost to George Washington. At the close of the season, Peters took advantage of looser NBA draft eligibility rules to declare for the 2016 NBA draft. He ultimately chose to withdraw his name and after speculation that he might transfer, he opted to return to Valparaiso for his senior year in 2016–17.

Prior to the start of the 2016–17 season, Peters was named the preseason Horizon League Player of the Year. He surpassed the 2,000 career point mark in a December 28, 2016 game against Chicago State. On March 10, 2017, Peters had a surgery on his right foot, which resulted in him missing the last four games of his college career. At the end of the regular season, Peters was named the Horizon League Player of the Year. He led the conference with 23.0 points and 10.1 rebounds per game, being one of two players in Division I games to record an average of 20 points and 10 rebounds that season (the other being Tim Kempton Jr.). He also became the only Division I player that year to be in the Top 20 for both points and rebounds. Peters scored 2,348 total points and grabbed 996 total rebounds in his Valparaiso career, which are both school records.

== Professional career ==
=== Phoenix Suns (2017–2018) ===
In the 2017 NBA draft, Peters was selected with the 54th pick by the Phoenix Suns. While Peters was named a member of the Suns' 2017 NBA Summer League squad, he ultimately did not play due to a right foot stress fracture he had before working out with other teams properly throughout the NBA's draft process. He officially signed with the Suns on September 18, 2017. His contract would be a two-way deal, meaning he'd split his playing time between Phoenix and their NBA G League affiliate, the Northern Arizona Suns. Peters made his professional debut on October 18, 2017, against the Portland Trail Blazers. After playing in one more game with Phoenix, Peters was transferred to the Northern Arizona Suns affiliate team on October 23, 2017. Throughout this time, Peters would split his playing time between Northern Arizona and Phoenix, mostly playing with the Northern Arizona team in the process. In the last game of his rookie season, he would record a career-high 36 points (including a franchise record-high 8 three-pointers for rookies) and a season-high 9 rebounds in a blowout 124–97 win against the Dallas Mavericks on April 10, 2018. He was the only player besides James Harden that season to record at least 35 points with 8 three-pointers made and 7 rebounds in a single game.

On July 1, 2018, Peters changed his number from 25 to 14 while playing for the Suns in the 2018 NBA Summer League.

=== CSKA Moscow (2018–2019) ===
On July 23, 2018, the PBC CSKA Moscow of the VTB United League announced the signing of Peters. He won the VTB League title averaging 6.2 points per game. On July 1, 2019, Peters was released from the Russian club.

=== Anadolu Efes (2019–2020) ===
On July 8, 2019, Alec Peters signed a one-year contract with Turkish champions and EuroLeague finalists Anadolu Efes. After averaging 4.2 points per game, he left the team on June 30, 2020.

=== Saski Baskonia (2020–2022) ===
On July 4, 2020, Peters signed with Saski Baskonia of the Liga ACB.

=== Olympiacos (2022–2026) ===
On July 10, 2022, Peters signed a two-year (1+1) contract with Olympiacos of the Greek Basket League and the EuroLeague. On July 5, 2023, Olympiacos picked up the option in their mutual contract and Peters remained with the club. On February 21, 2024, Peters renewed his contract with the Greek club through 2027 in the midst of a breakout season.

=== Olimpia Milano (2026–present) ===
On June 25, 2026, Peters signed with Olimpia Milano of the Lega Basket Serie A (LBA) and the EuroLeague.

== The Basketball Tournament ==
Peters joined Team Hines in The Basketball Tournament 2020.

== Career statistics ==
Legend
GP	Games played	GS	Games started	MPG	Minutes per game
FG%	Field-goal percentage	3P%	3-point field-goal percentage	FT%	Free-throw percentage
RPG	Rebounds per game	APG	Assists per game	SPG	Steals per game
BPG	Blocks per game	PPG	Points per game	PIR	Performance index rating
**Bold**	Career high

=== NBA ===
==== Regular season ====
Year	Team	GP	GS	MPG	FG%	3P%	FT%	RPG	APG	SPG	BPG	PPG
2017–18	Phoenix	20	0	11.3	.378	.310	.800	1.9	.6	.1	.1	4.1
Career		20	0	11.3	.378	.310	.800	1.9	.6	.1	.1	4.1

=== EuroLeague ===
†	Denotes season in which Peters won the EuroLeague
*	Led the league

Year	Team	GP	GS	MPG	FG%	3P%	FT%	RPG	APG	SPG	BPG	PPG	PIR
2018–19†	CSKA Moscow	36	18	16.3	.420	.433	.893	2.7	.7	.5	.1	5.3	4.3
2019–20	Anadolu Efes	27	6	13.7	.543	.417	.846	2.1	.5	.3	.1	4.2	5.0
2020–21	Baskonia	33	6	23.5	.500	.447	.915	3.9	**1.6**	.5	.2	11.5	12.5
2021–22	Baskonia	12	8	23.8	.523	.390	.818	3.8	1.3	**.6**	**.3**	9.8	10.3
2022–23	Olympiacos	37	3	13.2	.425	.411	**.964**	2.5	.4	.4	.1	4.6	4.5
2023–24	Olympiacos	**40**	**40**	**25.4**	**.565**	**.535***	.878	**4.9**	**1.6**	.5	.1	**13.1**	**14.4**
2024–25	Olympiacos	**40**	4	16.4	540	.523*	.938	2.6	.8	.3	.1	8.1	8.4
Career		225	85	18.4	.507	.463	.900	3.1	1.0	.4	.1	8.0	9.0

=== Domestic leagues ===
Year	Team	League	GP	MPG	FG%	3P%	FT%	RPG	APG	SPG	BPG	PPG
2017–18	(United States) N. A. Suns	G League	35	34.0	.467	.411	.851	7.1	2.0	.6	.3	17.6
2018–19	(Russia) CSKA Moscow	VTBUL	21	14.8	.393	.344	.893	2.6	.8	.4	.2	6.2
2019–20	(Turkey) Anadolu Efes	TBSL	10	25.5	.465	.354	.842	4.6	1.6	.5	.1	11.3
2020–21	(Spain) Baskonia	ACB	36	21.8	.467	.396	.928	3.8	1.2	.4	.2	10.4
2021–22	(Spain) Baskonia	ACB	23	26.5	.429	.386	.933	5.5	2.0	.8	.3	10.4
2022–23	(Greece) Olympiacos	GBL	29	14.6	.569	.400	.700	2.1	1.6	.8	.2	5.9
2023–24	(Greece) Olympiacos	GBL	35	26.9	.558	.496	.921	5.8	2.1	.9	.2	14.8
2024–25	(Greece) Olympiacos	GBL	30	20.9	.548	.449	.886	3.7	1.5	.8	.1	11.8

=== College ===
Year	Team	GP	GS	MPG	FG%	3P%	FT%	RPG	APG	SPG	BPG	PPG
2013–14	Valparaiso	34	34	29.6	.490	.383	.773	4.8	1.4	**.9**	.1	12.7
2014–15	Valparaiso	34	34	30.6	.489	**.466**	.829	6.7	1.2	.7	.3	16.8
2015–16	Valparaiso	**37**	**37**	32.1	**.505**	.440	.850	8.4	1.3	.7	.3	18.4
2016–17	Valparaiso	29	29	**35.1**	.466	.363	**.887**	**10.1**	**2.2**	.8	**.4**	**23.0**
Career		134	134	31.7	.487	.416	.846	7.4	1.5	.8	.3	17.5
