= 2014–15 Green Bay Phoenix men's basketball team =

American college basketball season

2014–15 Green Bay Phoenix men's basketball

Gulf Coast Showcase champions

NIT, First round
- Conference: Horizon League
- Record: 24–9 (12–4 Horizon)
- Head coach: Brian Wardle (5th season)
- Assistant coaches: Brian Barone; Jimmie Foster; Chrys Cornelius
- Home arena: Resch Center

2014–15 Horizon League men's basketball standings
	Conf.				Overall
Team	W		L	PCT	W		L	PCT
Valparaiso †	13	–	3	.813	28	–	6	.824
Green Bay	12	–	4	.750	24	–	9	.727
Oakland	11	–	5	.688	16	–	17	.485
Cleveland State	11	–	5	.688	19	–	15	.559
Milwaukee *	9	–	7	.563	14	–	16	.467
Detroit	7	–	9	.438	15	–	18	.455
UIC	4	–	12	.250	10	–	24	.294
Wright State	3	–	13	.188	11	–	20	.355
Youngstown State	2	–	14	.125	11	–	21	.344
† 2015 Horizon League Tournament winner * Ineligible for postseason play due to APR penalties

The 2014–15 Green Bay Phoenix men's basketball team represented the University of Wisconsin–Green Bay in the 2014–15 NCAA Division I men's basketball season. Their head coach was fifth year coach Brian Wardle. The Phoenix played their home games at the Resch Center and were members of the Horizon League. They finished the season 24–9, 12–4 in Horizon League play to finish in second place. They advanced to the semifinals of the Horizon League tournament where they lost to Valparaiso. They were invited to the National Invitation Tournament where they lost in the first round to Illinois State.

Keifer Sykes was named the Horizon League Player of the Year for the second year in a row. Jordan Fouse won conference All-Defensive team honors.

== Roster ==
2014–15 Green Bay Phoenix men's basketball team
Players
Coaches

Pos.	#	Name	Height	Weight	Year	Hometown
F	1	Kerem Kanter	6 ft 9 in (2.06 m)	245 lb (111 kg)	Fr	Istanbul, Turkey
G	2	Turner Botz	6 ft 7 in (2.01 m)	215 lb (98 kg)	So	Little Chute, WI
G	3	Khalil Small	6 ft 2 in (1.88 m)	205 lb (93 kg)	Fr	Chicago, IL
G/F	4	Jordan Fouse	6 ft 7 in (2.01 m)	225 lb (102 kg)	Jr	Racine, WI
G/F	10	Josh Humphrey	6 ft 5 in (1.96 m)	204 lb (93 kg)	RS Jr	Chicago, IL
G	12	Carrington Love	6 ft 1 in (1.85 m)	171 lb (78 kg)	Jr	Milwaukee, WI
F	15	Greg Mays	6 ft 9 in (2.06 m)	220 lb (100 kg)	Sr	Chicago, IL
G	23	Daeshon Francis	6 ft 3 in (1.91 m)	175 lb (79 kg)	Fr	Indianapolis, IN
G	24	Keifer Sykes	6 ft 0 in (1.83 m)	180 lb (82 kg)	Sr	Chicago, IL
G	32	Tevin Findlay	6 ft 4 in (1.93 m)	190 lb (86 kg)	So	Malton, ON, Canada
F	34	Alfonzo McKinnie	6 ft 8 in (2.03 m)	215 lb (98 kg)	RS Sr	Chicago, IL
F	45	Kenneth Lowe	6 ft 8 in (2.03 m)	230 lb (104 kg)	So	Little Chute, WI
F/C	50	Henry Uwadiae	6 ft 8 in (2.03 m)	230 lb (104 kg)	So	Benin City, Nigeria

Head coach

- Brian Wardle (Marquette)

Assistant coach(es)

- Brian Barone (Marquette)
- Jimmie Foster (South Dakota)
- Chrys Cornelius (Western Illinois)

Legend

- (C) Team captain
- (S) Suspended
- (I) Ineligible
- (W) Walk-on
- Injured
- Current redshirt

Roster
Last update: 2014–11–07

== Schedule ==
Date time, TV	Rank^{#}	Opponent^{#}	Result	Record	Site (attendance) city, state
Exhibition
10/30/2014*; 7:00 pm		Ripon	W 78–56		Resch Center (2,229); Green Bay, WI
Regular season
11/15/2014*; 3:00 pm, ESPN3		Illinois–Springfield; Gulf Coast Showcase Opening Round	W 88–57	1–0	Resch Center (3,201); Green Bay, WI
11/19/2014*; 8:00 pm, BTN		at No. 3 Wisconsin	L 60–84	1–1	Kohl Center (17,279); Madison, WI
11/24/2014*; 11:00 am		vs. East Carolina; Gulf Coast Showcase quarterfinals	W 66–49	2–1	Germain Arena (2,118); Estero, FL
11/25/2014*; 5:00 pm		vs. Evansville; Gulf Coast Showcase semifinals	W 64–62	3–1	Germain Arena (3,027); Estero, FL
11/26/2014*; 7:30 pm		vs. Florida Gulf Coast; Gulf Coast Showcase championship	W 59–45	4–1	Germain Arena (3,867); Estero, FL
12/01/2014*; 7:00 pm, ESPN3		Minnesota–Duluth	W 78–52	5–1	Resch Center (2,249); Green Bay, WI
12/04/2014*; 6:00 pm		at Georgia State	L 48–72	5–2	GSU Sports Arena (2,181); Atlanta, GA
12/06/2014*; 1:00 pm, ESPN3		at No. 15 Miami (FL)	W 68–55	6–2	BankUnited Center (4,735); Coral Gables, FL
12/13/2014*; 4:00 pm, ESPN3		Drake	W 64–48	7–2	Resch Center (3,399); Green Bay, WI
12/17/2014*; 7:00 pm, ASN		Morehead State	W 66–50	8–2	Resch Center (2,443); Green Bay, WI
12/21/2014*; 1:00 pm		vs. Arkansas–Little Rock; South Point Holiday Hoops Classic semifinals	W 66–46	9–2	South Point Arena (N/A); Enterprise, NV
12/22/2014*; 3:30 pm		vs. UC Irvine; South Point Holiday Hoops Classic championship	L 70–72	9–3	South Point Arena (N/A); Enterprise, NV
12/27/2014*; 12:00 pm, ESPN3		Georgia State	W 78–61	10–3	Resch Center (4,267); Green Bay, WI
12/31/2014*; 12:00 pm, ESPN3		Chicago State	W 54–50	11–3	Resch Center (2,870); Green Bay, WI
01/05/2015; 7:00 pm, ESPN3		Wright State	W 79–55	12–3 (1-0)	Resch Center (2,814); Green Bay, WI
01/09/2015; 8:00 pm, ESPNU		at Milwaukee	W 79–63	13–3 (2–0)	UW–Milwaukee Panther Arena (3,718); Milwaukee, WI
01/11/2015; 7:00 pm, ESPN3		Youngstown State	W 82–67	14–3 (3–0)	Resch Center (2,428); Green Bay, WI
01/15/2015; 6:00 pm, ESPN3		at Oakland	L 66–69	14–4 (3–1)	Athletics Center O'rena (1,973); Rochester, MI
01/17/2015; 12:00 pm, ESPN3		at Detroit	W 70–64	15–4 (4–1)	Calihan Hall (3,782); Detroit, MI
01/20/2015; 7:00 pm, ASN		UIC	W 78–55	16–4 (5–1)	Resch Center (2,914); Green Bay, WI
01/23/2015; 8:00 pm, ESPNU		Valparaiso	W 51–50	17–4 (6–1)	Resch Center (4,916); Green Bay, WI
01/31/2015; 1:00 pm, ESPN3		at Cleveland State	L 62–76	17–5 (6–2)	Wolstein Center (3,525); Cleveland, OH
02/02/2015; 6:00 pm, ASN		at Wright State	W 71–58	18–5 (7–2)	Nutter Center (3,590); Fairborn, OH
02/05/2015; 7:00 pm, ESPN3		Milwaukee	W 81–70	19–5 (8–2)	Resch Center (4,693); Green Bay, WI
02/11/2015; 6:45 pm, ESPN3		at Youngstown State	W 63–62	20–5 (9–2)	Beeghly Center (2,599); Youngstown, OH
02/13/2015; 6:00 pm, ESPN2		at Valparaiso	L 59–63	20–6 (9–3)	Athletics–Recreation Center (4,920); Valparaiso, IN
02/18/2015; 7:00 pm, ESPN3		Detroit	W 96–76	21–6 (10–3)	Resch Center (3,252); Green Bay, WI
02/20/2015; 6:00 pm, ESPN2		Cleveland State	L 61–66 ^{OT}	21–7 (10–4)	Resch Center (4,674); Green Bay, WI
02/26/2015; 7:00 pm, ESPN3		at UIC	W 72–67	22–7 (11–4)	UIC Pavilion (2,768); Chicago, IL
02/28/2015; 1:00 pm, ESPN3		Oakland	W 83–63	23–7 (12–4)	Resch Center (6,019); Green Bay, WI
Horizon League tournament
03/07/2015; 6:00 pm, ESPN3/ESPNU (Delayed on U)		vs. UIC; Semifinals	W 70–56	24–7	Athletics–Recreation Center (3,629); Valparaiso, IN
03/10/2015; 6:00 pm, ESPN		vs. Valparaiso; Championship game	L 44–54	24–8	Athletics–Recreation Center (4,713); Valparaiso, IN
NIT
03/18/2015*; 7:00 pm, ESPNU	No. (5)	at No. (4) Illinois State; First round	L 56–69	24–9	Redbird Arena (4,942); Normal, IL
*Non-conference game. ^{#}Rankings from AP Poll. (#) Tournament seedings in parentheses. All times are in Central Time. (#) during NIT is seed within region.
