= 2014–15 Detroit Titans men's basketball team =

American college basketball season

2014–15 Detroit Titans men's basketball
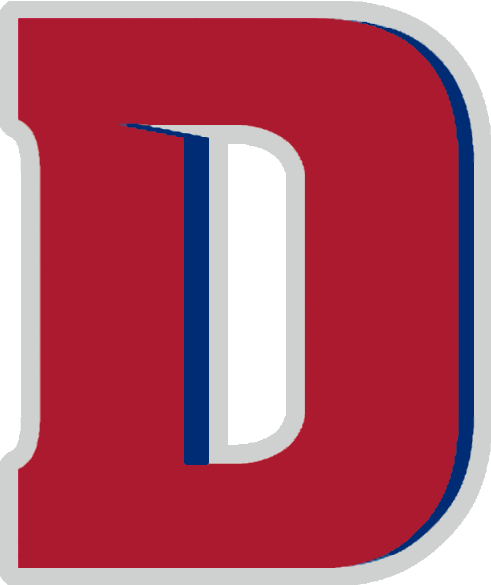
- Conference: Horizon League
- Record: 15–18 (7–9 Horizon)
- Head coach: Ray McCallum (7th season)
- Assistant coaches: Ernie Zeigler; Jay Smith; Steve Payne
- Home arena: Calihan Hall

2014–15 Horizon League men's basketball standings
	Conf.				Overall
Team	W		L	PCT	W		L	PCT
Valparaiso †	13	–	3	.813	28	–	6	.824
Green Bay	12	–	4	.750	24	–	9	.727
Oakland	11	–	5	.688	16	–	17	.485
Cleveland State	11	–	5	.688	19	–	15	.559
Milwaukee *	9	–	7	.563	14	–	16	.467
Detroit	7	–	9	.438	15	–	18	.455
UIC	4	–	12	.250	10	–	24	.294
Wright State	3	–	13	.188	11	–	20	.355
Youngstown State	2	–	14	.125	11	–	21	.344
† 2015 Horizon League Tournament winner * Ineligible for postseason play due to APR penalties

The 2014–15 Detroit Titans men's basketball team represented the University of Detroit Mercy in the 2014–15 NCAA Division I men's basketball season. Their head coach was Ray McCallum in his 7th season. The Titans played their home games at Calihan Hall and were members of the Horizon League. They finished the season 15–18, 7–9 in Horizon League play to finish in sixth place. They lost in the quarterfinals of the Horizon League tournament to Cleveland State.

== Roster ==
2014–15 Detroit Titans men's basketball team
Players
Coaches

Pos.	#	Name	Height	Weight	Year	Hometown
G/F	0	Chris Jenkins	6 ft 7 in (2.01 m)	186 lb (84 kg)	So	Detroit, MI
G	1	Anton Wilson	6 ft 5 in (1.96 m)	206 lb (93 kg)	Jr	Flint, MI
F	2	Juwan Howard, Jr.	6 ft 5 in (1.96 m)	232 lb (105 kg)	RS Sr	Detroit, MI
F	4	Patrick Onwenu (redshirt)	6 ft 6 in (1.98 m)	223 lb (101 kg)	Sr	Southfield, MI
PG	5	Matthew Grant	6 ft 0 in (1.83 m)	177 lb (80 kg)	So	Los Angeles, CA
PG	11	Jarod Williams	6 ft 1 in (1.85 m)	209 lb (95 kg)	So	Danville, VA
G	12	Brandan Kearney	6 ft 6 in (1.98 m)	188 lb (85 kg)	Sr	Detroit, MI
F	14	Youssoupha Kane	6 ft 9 in (2.06 m)	205 lb (93 kg)	Jr	Thiès, Senegal
F	15	Aaron Foster-Smith	6 ft 6 in (1.98 m)	231 lb (105 kg)	Fr	Taylor, MI
F	21	Jaleel Hogan	6 ft 6 in (1.98 m)	233 lb (106 kg)	Fr	Saginaw, MI
G	23	Carlton Brundidge	6 ft 2 in (1.88 m)	204 lb (93 kg)	RS Jr	Southfield, MI
C	32	Patrick Ackerman	6 ft 10 in (2.08 m)	218 lb (99 kg)	RS Jr	Rutland, MA
G/F	35	Paris Bass	6 ft 7 in (2.01 m)	187 lb (85 kg)	RS Fr	Birmingham, MI

Head coach

- Ray McCallum (Ball State)

Assistant coach(es)

- Steve Payne
- Jay Smith (Saginaw Valley State)
- Ernie Zeigler

Legend

- (C) Team captain
- (S) Suspended
- (I) Ineligible
- (W) Walk-on
- Injured
- Current redshirt

Roster
Last update: 2014–11–04

== Schedule ==
Date time, TV	Opponent	Result	Record	Site (attendance) city, state
Exhibition
11/01/2014*; 3:00 pm	Siena Heights	W 84–49		Calihan Hall (864); Detroit, MI
11/08/2014*; 2:30 pm	Marygrove	W 98–55		Calihan Hall; Detroit, MI
Regular season
11/14/2014*; 7:00 pm, Comcast 900/ESPN3	Rochester College	W 77–54	1–0	Calihan Hall (2,005); Detroit, MI
11/17/2014*; 11:00 pm, ESPNU	at Oregon; Legends Classic	L 66–83	1–1	Matthew Knight Arena (5,051); Eugene, OR
11/20/2014*; 6:00 pm, BTN	at No. 24 Michigan; Legends Classic	L 62–71	1–2	Crisler Center (11,812); Ann Arbor, MI
11/22/2014*; 3:00 pm, Comcast 900/ESPN3	South Alabama	W 66–53	2–2	Calihan Hall (2,203); Detroit, MI
11/24/2014*; 4:30 pm	vs. Maryland Eastern Shore; Legends Classic	W 69–55	3–2	Savage Arena (4,419); Toledo, OH
11/25/2014*; 7:00 pm	at Toledo; Legends Classic	W 82–79	4–2	Savage Arena (4,148); Toledo, OH
11/30/2014*; 3:00 pm, WADL/ESPN3	Bowling Green	L 63–64	4–3	Calihan Hall (2,563); Detroit, MI
12/01/2014*; 7:00 pm, Comcast 900/ESPN3	Aquinas (MI)	W 109–59	5–3	Calihan Hall (1,497); Detroit, MI
12/06/2014*; 3:00 pm, WADL/ESPN3	South Florida	W 67–57	6–3	Calihan Hall (2,664); Detroit, MI
12/13/2014*; 12:00 pm, ESPNU	No. 11 Wichita State	L 68–77	6–4	Calihan Hall (4,110); Detroit, MI
12/17/2014*; 7:30 pm, ESPN3	at UCF	L 70–75	6–5	CFE Arena (3,428); Orlando, FL
12/20/2014*; 4:00 pm	at Rhode Island	L 55–69	6–6	Ryan Center (4,694); Kingston, RI
12/23/2014*; 3:00 pm, P12N	at Arizona State	L 54–93	6–7	Wells Fargo Arena (4,727); Tempe, AZ
12/30/2014*; 7:00 pm, WADL/ESPN3	Oral Roberts	L 73–77 ^{OT}	6–8	Calihan Hall (2,164); Detroit, MI
01/02/2015; 7:00 pm, ESPN3	at Wright State	L 57–70	6–9 (0–1)	Nutter Center (4,755); Fairborn, OH
01/04/2015; 1:00 pm, ASN	Milwaukee	L 67–83	7–9 (1–1)	Calihan Hall (2,002); Detroit, MI
01/10/2015; 3:00 pm, WADL/ESPN3	Oakland	W 74–54	8–9 (2–1)	Calihan Hall (6,522); Detroit, MI
01/14/2015; 8:00 pm, ESPN3	at UIC	W 69–68	9–9 (3–1)	UIC Pavilion (3,001); Chicago, IL
01/17/2015; 3:00 pm, WADL/ESPN3	Green Bay	L 64–70	9–10 (3–2)	Calihan Hall (3,782); Detroit, MI
01/19/2015*; 3:00 pm	at Northeastern	W 81–69 ^{OT}	10–10	Matthews Arena (1,032); Boston, MA
01/23/2015; 7:00 pm, ESPN3	at Cleveland State	L 66–70	10–11 (3–3)	Wolstein Center (2,803); Cleveland, OH
01/26/2015; 7:00 pm, WADL/ESPN3	Wright State	L 53–64	10–12 (3–4)	Calihan Hall (1,786); Detroit, MI
01/29/2015; 7:00 pm, Comcast 900/ESPN3	Youngstown State	W 93–87 ^{OT}	11–12 (4–4)	Calihan Hall (1,674); Detroit, MI
01/31/2015; 7:00 pm, ESPN3	at Milwaukee	L 74–78	11–13 (4–5)	UW–Milwaukee Panther Arena (3,410); Milwaukee, WI
02/04/2015; 8:00 pm, ESPN3	at Valparaiso	L 70–78	11–14 (4–6)	Athletics–Recreation Center (1,905); Valparaiso, IN
02/08/2015; 2:00 pm, Comcast 900/ESPN3	UIC	L 73–83	11–15 (4–7)	Calihan Hall (2,345); Detroit, MI
02/13/2015; 8:00 pm, ESPNU	Cleveland State	W 66–65	12–15 (5–7)	Calihan Hall (1,723); Detroit, MI
02/15/2015; 3:00 pm, Comcast 900/ESPN3	at Oakland	L 78–83	12–16 (5–8)	Athletics Center O'rena (4,101); Rochester, MI
02/18/2015; 8:00 pm, ESPN3	at Green Bay	L 76–96	12–17 (5–9)	Resch Center (3,252); Green Bay, WI
02/21/2015; 7:00 pm, ESPN3	at Youngstown State	W 83–70	13–17 (6–9)	Beeghly Center (1,780); Youngstown, OH
02/25/2015; 7:00 pm, WADL/ESPN3	Valparaiso	W 63–60	14–17 (7–9)	Calihan Hall (1,855); Detroit, MI
Horizon League tournament
03/03/2015; 7:00 pm, ESPN3	Youngstown State; First round	W 77–67	15–17	Calihan Hall (1,725); Detroit, MI
03/06/2015; 9:30 pm, ESPN3	vs. Cleveland State; Quarterfinals	L 53–70	15–18	Athletics–Recreation Center (1,650); Valparaiso, IN
*Non-conference game. ^{#}Rankings from AP Poll. (#) Tournament seedings in parentheses. All times are in Eastern Time.
