= 2014–15 Youngstown State Penguins men's basketball team =

American college basketball season

2014–15 Youngstown State Penguins men's basketball
- Conference: Horizon League
- Record: 11–21 (2–14 Horizon)
- Head coach: Jerry Slocum (10th season)
- Assistant coaches: Michael Wernicki; Brian DePaoli; Steve Hall
- Home arena: Beeghly Center

2014–15 Horizon League men's basketball standings
| | Conf. | | | | Overall |
| Team | W | | L | PCT | W | | L | PCT |
|---|---|---|---|---|---|---|---|---|
| Valparaiso † | 13 | – | 3 | .813 | 28 | – | 6 | .824 |
| Green Bay | 12 | – | 4 | .750 | 24 | – | 9 | .727 |
| Oakland | 11 | – | 5 | .688 | 16 | – | 17 | .485 |
| Cleveland State | 11 | – | 5 | .688 | 19 | – | 15 | .559 |
| Milwaukee * | 9 | – | 7 | .563 | 14 | – | 16 | .467 |
| Detroit | 7 | – | 9 | .438 | 15 | – | 18 | .455 |
| UIC | 4 | – | 12 | .250 | 10 | – | 24 | .294 |
| Wright State | 3 | – | 13 | .188 | 11 | – | 20 | .355 |
| Youngstown State | 2 | – | 14 | .125 | 11 | – | 21 | .344 |
† 2015 Horizon League Tournament winner * Ineligible for postseason play due to APR penalties

The 2014–15 Youngstown State Penguins men's basketball team represented Youngstown State University during the 2014–15 NCAA Division I men's basketball season. The Penguins, led by tenth year head coach Jerry Slocum, played their home games at the Beeghly Center and were members of the Horizon League. They finished the season 11–21, 2–14 in Horizon League play to finish in last place. They lost in the first round of the Horizon League tournament to Detroit.

== Roster ==
| Number | Name | Position | Height | Weight | Year | Hometown |
|---|---|---|---|---|---|---|
| 0 | Shaun Stewart | Guard | 6–0 | 170 | Junior | Indian Trail, North Carolina |
| 1 | Jalon Plummer | Guard | 6–5 | 180 | Sophomore | Belleville, Michigan |
| 2 | Larry Johnson, Jr. | Forward | 6–7 | 220 | Junior | Oak Park, Michigan |
| 4 | Shawn Amiker | Guard | 6–5 | 185 | Senior | Oak Park, Michigan |
| 5 | Sidney Umude | Forward | 6–7 | 205 | Freshman | San Antonio, Texas |
| 10 | Marcus Keene | Guard | 5–11 | 160 | Sophomore | San Antonio, Texas |
| 11 | DJ Cole | Guard | 5–11 | 180 | Senior | Olathe, Kansas |
| 14 | Tyler Warford | Guard | 6–1 | 170 | Sophomore | Pittsburgh, Pennsylvania |
| 20 | Bobby Hain | Forward | 6–10 | 240 | Junior | Jupiter, Florida |
| 22 | Francisco Santiago | Guard | 6–1 | 160 | Sophomore | Cleveland, Ohio |
| 23 | Osandai Vaughn | Guard | 6–4 | 195 | Sophomore | Charlotte, North Carolina |
| 24 | Cameron Morse | Guard | 6–2 | 180 | Freshman | Flint, Michigan |
| 25 | Fletcher Larson | Forward | 6–8 | 230 | Senior | Lakewood, New York |
| 32 | Jordan Kaufman | Center | 7–0 | 250 | Junior | Andover, Kansas |
| 33 | Bryce Nickels | Forward | 6–8 | 200 | Freshman | Tampa, Florida |
| 34 | Ryan Strollo | Guard | 6–2 | 190 | Sophomore | Youngstown, Ohio |

== Schedule ==
| Date time, TV | Opponent | Result | Record | Site (attendance) city, state |
Regular season
| 11/15/2014*; 7:00 pm | Kent State | L 61–69 | 0–1 | Beeghly Center (2,840); Youngstown, OH |
| 11/16/2014*; 4:00 pm | Oberlin; EMU Showcase | W 71–53 | 1–1 | Beeghly Center (1,353); Youngstown, OH |
| 11/18/2014*; 7:00 pm | at Central Michigan | L 63–75 | 1–2 | McGuirk Arena (2,165); Mount Pleasant, MI |
| 11/21/2014*; 7:00 pm | at Eastern Michigan; EMU Showcase | L 62–71 | 1–3 | EMU Convocation Center (680); Ypsilanti, MI |
| 11/22/2014*; 4:30 pm | vs. Longwood; EMU Showcase | W 82–72 | 2–3 | EMU Convocation Center (624); Ypsilanti, MI |
| 11/23/2014*; 12:00 pm | vs. UNC Greensboro; EMU Showcase | W 76–67 | 3–3 | EMU Convocation Center (395); Ypsilanti, MI |
| 11/26/2014*; 7:00 pm | UMKC | W 66–63 | 4–3 | Beeghly Center (1,177); Youngstown, OH |
| 11/29/2014*; 3:00 pm | at Illinois State | L 73–85 ^{OT} | 4–4 | Redbird Arena (4,095); Normal, IL |
| 12/02/2014*; 7:00 pm | at Robert Morris | W 89–81 | 5–4 | Charles L. Sewall Center (890); Moon Township, PA |
| 12/05/2014*; 8:00 pm | at South Dakota | W 87–79 | 6–4 | DakotaDome (1,492); Vermillion, SD |
| 12/07/2014*; 4:00 pm | Thiel | W 70–45 | 7–4 | Beeghly Center (1,122); Youngstown, OH |
| 12/13/2014*; 5:00 pm, SECN+ | at Texas A&M | L 63–81 | 7–5 | Reed Arena (7,065); College Station, TX |
| 12/17/2014*; 7:00 pm, ESPN3 | Kennesaw State | L 84–90 | 7–6 | Beeghly Center (1,229); Youngstown, OH |
| 12/19/2014*; 1:30 pm | Wilberforce | W 92–71 | 8–6 | Beeghly Center (2,050); Youngstown, OH |
| 12/31/2014*; 1:00 pm, ESPN3 | Northern Kentucky | W 78–74 | 9–6 | Beeghly Center (1,396); Youngstown, OH |
| 01/02/2015; 4:00 pm | at UIC | L 71–77 | 9–7 (0–1) | UIC Pavilion (3,027); Chicago, IL |
| 01/04/2015; 2:30 pm | at Valparaiso | L 64–79 | 9–8 (0–2) | Athletics–Recreation Center (1,988); Valparaiso, IN |
| 01/08/2015; 7:00 pm | Wright State | L 61–70 | 9–9 (0–3) | Beeghly Center (1,215); Youngstown, OH |
| 01/11/2015; 8:00 pm | at Green Bay | L 67–82 | 9–10 (0–4) | Resch Center (2,428); Green Bay, WI |
| 01/14/2015; 8:30 pm | at Milwaukee | L 62–77 | 9–11 (0–5) | UW–Milwaukee Panther Arena (2,268); Milwaukee, WI |
| 01/17/2015; 7:00 pm | Cleveland State | L 61–74 | 9–12 (0–6) | Beeghly Center (3,385); Youngstown, OH |
| 01/20/2015; 7:00 pm | Valparaiso | L 62–77 | 9–13 (0–7) | Beeghly Center (1,719); Youngstown, OH |
| 01/24/2015; 7:00 pm, ESPN3 | UIC | W 77–64 | 10–13 (1–7) | Beeghly Center (2,828); Youngstown, OH |
| 01/29/2015; 7:00 pm, ESPN3 | at Detroit | L 87–93 ^{OT} | 10–14 (1–8) | Calihan Hall (1,674); Detroit, MI |
| 02/01/2015; 12:30 pm | Oakland | L 80–96 | 10–15 (1–9) | Beeghly Center (1,512); Youngstown, OH |
| 02/04/2015; 7:00 pm, ESPN3 | at Cleveland State | L 60–73 | 10–16 (1–10) | Wolstein Center (1,731); Cleveland, OH |
| 02/11/2015; 7:45 pm, ESPN3 | Green Bay | L 62–63 | 10–17 (1–11) | Beeghly Center (2,599); Youngstown, OH |
| 02/15/2015; 3:00 pm | at Wright State | W 74–69 | 11–17 (2–11) | Nutter Center (5,005); Fairborn, OH |
| 02/21/2015; 7:00 pm | Detroit | L 70–83 | 11–18 (2–12) | Beeghly Center (1,780); Youngstown, OH |
| 02/25/2015; 7:00 pm, ESPN3 | at Oakland | L 71–82 | 11–19 (2–13) | Athletics Center O'rena (2,233); Rochester, MI |
| 02/28/2015; 7:00 pm, ESPN3 | Milwaukee | L 74–82 | 11–20 (2–14) | Beeghly Center (4,382); Youngstown, OH |
Horizon League tournament
| 03/03/2015; 8:00 pm, ESPN3 | at Detroit; First round | L 67–77 | 11–21 | Calihan Hall (1,725); Detroit, MI |
*Non-conference game. ^{#}Rankings from AP Poll. (#) Tournament seedings in parentheses. All times are in Eastern Time.
