= 2014–15 Milwaukee Panthers men's basketball team =

American college basketball season

2014–15 Milwaukee Panthers men's basketball
- Conference: Horizon League
- Record: 14–16 (9–7 Horizon League)
- Head coach: Rob Jeter (10th season)
- Assistant coaches: Duffy Conroy (11th season); Chad Boudreau (10th season); Sharif Chambliss (3rd season)
- Home arena: UW–Milwaukee Panther Arena

2014–15 Horizon League men's basketball standings
	Conf.				Overall
Team	W		L	PCT	W		L	PCT
Valparaiso †	13	–	3	.813	28	–	6	.824
Green Bay	12	–	4	.750	24	–	9	.727
Oakland	11	–	5	.688	16	–	17	.485
Cleveland State	11	–	5	.688	19	–	15	.559
Milwaukee *	9	–	7	.563	14	–	16	.467
Detroit	7	–	9	.438	15	–	18	.455
UIC	4	–	12	.250	10	–	24	.294
Wright State	3	–	13	.188	11	–	20	.355
Youngstown State	2	–	14	.125	11	–	21	.344
† 2015 Horizon League Tournament winner * Ineligible for postseason play due to APR penalties

The 2014–15 Milwaukee Panthers men's basketball team represented the University of Wisconsin–Milwaukee during the 2014–15 NCAA Division I men's basketball season. The Panthers, led by tenth year head coach Rob Jeter, played their home games at the UW–Milwaukee Panther Arena and the Klotsche Center and were members of the Horizon League. They finished the season 14–16, 9–7 in Horizon League play to finish in fifth place.

Due to Academic Progress Rate penalties, Milwaukee were ineligible for a postseason tournament including the 2015 Horizon League men's basketball tournament.

== Roster ==
2014–15 Milwaukee Panthers men's basketball team
Players
Coaches

Pos.	#	Name	Height	Weight	Year	Hometown
G	2	Akeem Springs	6 ft 4 in (1.93 m)	210 lb (95 kg)	RS So	Waukegan, Illinois
G	5	Cody Wichmann	6 ft 5 in (1.96 m)	210 lb (95 kg)	So	Pulaski, Wisconsin
G	15	Trinson White	6 ft 5 in (1.96 m)	190 lb (86 kg)	Jr	Milwaukee, Wisconsin
F	21	Dan Studer	6 ft 7 in (2.01 m)	230 lb (104 kg)	RS Jr	Germantown, Wisconsin
G	22	Evan Richard	6 ft 2 in (1.88 m)	175 lb (79 kg)	Sr	Kieler, Wisconsin
F	23	J.J. Panoske	6 ft 10 in (2.08 m)	225 lb (102 kg)	Jr	Brodhead, Wisconsin
G	25	Steve McWhorter	6 ft 2 in (1.88 m)	185 lb (84 kg)	Sr	Racine, Wisconsin
G	30	JeVon Lyle	6 ft 2 in (1.88 m)	175 lb (79 kg)	Jr	Kansas City, Missouri
F	31	Matt Tiby	6 ft 8 in (2.03 m)	230 lb (104 kg)	Jr	Urbandale, Iowa
F	34	Austin Arians	6 ft 6 in (1.98 m)	200 lb (91 kg)	Jr	Stoughton, Wisconsin
F	50	Brett Prahl	6 ft 9 in (2.06 m)	225 lb (102 kg)	RS Fr	East Troy, Wisconsin
F	52	Alex Prahl	6 ft 9 in (2.06 m)	225 lb (102 kg)	RS Fr	East Troy, Wisconsin

Head coach

- Rob Jeter (UW–Platteville)

Assistant coach(es)

- Chad Boudreau (Hannibal–LaGrange)
- Duffy Conroy (St. Ambrose)
- Sharif Chambliss (Wisconsin)

Legend

- (C) Team captain
- (S) Suspended
- (I) Ineligible
- (W) Walk-on
- Injured
- Current redshirt

Roster

== Schedule ==
- All conference games aired on the Horizon League website

Date time, TV	Opponent	Result	Record	Site (attendance) city, state
Exhibition
11/06/2014*; 7:00 pm	UW–Platteville	W 68–54		UW–Milwaukee Panther Arena; Milwaukee, WI
Regular season
11/14/2014*; 9:00 pm, ESPNU	at Auburn; MGM Grand Main Event Opening Round	L 73–83	0–1	Auburn Arena (8,114); Auburn, AL
11/17/2014*; 7:00 pm	Minnesota–Crookston	W 75–54	1–1	UW–Milwaukee Panther Arena (1,917); Milwaukee, WI
11/19/2014*; 7:00 pm, TWCS	IUPUI	L 68–70	1–2	UW–Milwaukee Panther Arena (2,019); Milwaukee, WI
11/21/2014*; 7:00 pm	at Oklahoma State; MGM Grand Main Event Opening Round	L 68–82	1–3	Gallagher-Iba Arena (5,909); Stillwater, OK
11/24/2014*; 5:00 pm	vs. Louisiana–Lafayette; MGM Grand Main Event	W 56–52	2–3	MGM Grand Garden Arena (1,192); Paradise, NV
11/26/2014*; 3:00 pm	vs. Oral Roberts; MGM Grand Main Event	L 66–69	2–4	MGM Grand Garden Arena (1,712); Paradise, NV
11/29/2014*; 3:00 pm	Concordia–St. Paul	W 64–59	3–4	UW–Milwaukee Panther Arena (1,892); Milwaukee, WI
12/03/2014*; 7:00 pm, TWCS	UMKC	W 65–56	4–4	UW–Milwaukee Panther Arena (1,910); Milwaukee, WI
12/07/2014*; 1:00 pm, FS1	at DePaul	L 61–83	4–5	Allstate Arena (N/A); Rosemont, IL
12/10/2014*; 8:00 pm, ESPN2	No. 5 Wisconsin	L 54–93	4–6	UW–Milwaukee Panther Arena (10,120); Milwaukee, WI
12/14/2014*; 5:00 pm	Montana	W 73–58	5–6	Klotsche Center (1,781); Milwaukee, WI
12/20/2014*; 7:00 pm	at SIU Edwardsville	L 56–61	5–7	Vadalabene Center (918); Edwardsville, IL
12/22/2014*; 8:00 pm, ESPNU	at Arkansas	L 54–84	5–8	Bud Walton Arena (7,725); Fayetteville, AR
12/28/2014*; 2:00 pm	at South Dakota	L 60–84	5–9	DakotaDome (1,298); Vermillion, SD
01/02/2015; 6:00 pm, TWCS	at Cleveland State	L 57–84	5–10 (0–1)	Wolstein Center (1,727); Cleveland, OH
01/04/2015; 1:00 pm	at Detroit	L 67–83	5–11 (0–2)	Calihan Hall (2,002); Detroit, MI
01/09/2015; 8:00 pm, ESPNU	Green Bay	L 63–79	5–12 (0–3)	UW–Milwaukee Panther Arena (3,718); Milwaukee, WI
01/14/2015; 7:30 pm, TWCS	Youngstown State	W 77–62	6–12 (1–3)	UW–Milwaukee Panther Arena (2,268); Milwaukee, WI
01/20/2015; 7:00 pm, TWCS	Wright State	W 67–41	7–12 (2–3)	UW–Milwaukee Panther Arena (2,040); Milwaukee, WI
01/22/2015; 6:00 pm, ESPN3	at Oakland	L 53–66	7–13 (2–4)	Athletics Center O'rena (2,048); Rochester, MI
01/26/2015; 7:00 pm, ESPN3	at Valparaiso	L 48–73	7–14 (2–5)	Athletics–Recreation Center (2,137); Valparaiso, IN
01/29/2015; 7:00 pm, TWCS	UIC	W 71–65	8–14 (3–5)	UW–Milwaukee Panther Arena (3,009); Milwaukee, WI
01/31/2015; 4:00 pm, TWCS	Detroit	W 78–74	9–14 (4–5)	UW–Milwaukee Panther Arena (3,410); Milwaukee, WI
02/05/2015; 7:00 pm, TWCS	at Green Bay	L 70–81	9–15 (4–6)	Resch Center (4,693); Green Bay, WI
02/10/2015; 7:00 pm, TWCS	Oakland	W 84–67	10–15 (5–6)	UW–Milwaukee Panther Arena (3,016); Milwaukee, WI
02/15/2015; 1:00 pm, ESPN3	Valparaiso	L 55–62	10–16 (5–7)	UW–Milwaukee Panther Arena (3,375); Milwaukee, WI
02/19/2015; 7:00 pm, ESPN3	at UIC	W 71–60	11–16 (6–7)	UIC Pavilion (2,591); Chicago, IL
02/22/2015; 2:00 pm	Cleveland State	W 66–60	12–16 (7–7)	UW–Milwaukee Panther Arena (3,405); Milwaukee, WI
02/26/2015; 6:00 pm, ESPN3	at Wright State	W 61–58	13–16 (8–7)	Nutter Center (3,888); Fairborn, OH
02/28/2015; 6:00 pm, ESPN3	at Youngstown State	W 82–74	14–16 (9–7)	Beeghly Center (4,382); Youngstown, OH
*Non-conference game. ^{#}Rankings from AP Poll. (#) Tournament seedings in parentheses. All times are in Central Time.
