= 2014–15 Oakland Golden Grizzlies men's basketball team =

American college basketball season

2014–15 Oakland Golden Grizzlies men's basketball

CIT, First round
- Conference: Horizon League
- Record: 16–17 (11–5 Horizon)
- Head coach: Greg Kampe (31st season)
- Associate head coach: Saddi Washington
- Assistant coaches: Darren Sorenson; Brandon Weems
- Home arena: Athletics Center O'rena

2014–15 Horizon League men's basketball standings
	Conf.				Overall
Team	W		L	PCT	W		L	PCT
Valparaiso †	13	–	3	.813	28	–	6	.824
Green Bay	12	–	4	.750	24	–	9	.727
Oakland	11	–	5	.688	16	–	17	.485
Cleveland State	11	–	5	.688	19	–	15	.559
Milwaukee *	9	–	7	.563	14	–	16	.467
Detroit	7	–	9	.438	15	–	18	.455
UIC	4	–	12	.250	10	–	24	.294
Wright State	3	–	13	.188	11	–	20	.355
Youngstown State	2	–	14	.125	11	–	21	.344
† 2015 Horizon League Tournament winner * Ineligible for postseason play due to APR penalties

The 2014–15 Oakland Golden Grizzlies men's basketball team represented Oakland University during the 2014–15 NCAA Division I men's basketball season. The Golden Grizzlies, led by 31st year head coach Greg Kampe, played their home games at the Athletics Center O'rena. This was Oakland's second season in the Horizon League. They finished the season 16–17, 11–5 in Horizon League play to finish in a tie for third place. They lost in the quarterfinals of the Horizon League tournament to UIC. They were invited to the CollegeInsider.com Tournament where they lost in the first round to Eastern Illinois.

== 2014 recruiting class ==
The Golden Grizzlies brought in two freshmen from high school detailed in the following table. The Golden Grizzlies also accepted transfer Colin Weaver from North Pointe Preparatory school in Phoenix, Arizona. Weaver has sophomore eligibility.

College recruiting information
Name	Hometown	School	Height	Weight	Commit date
Alek Frascone; Point guard	Washington Township, MI	Eisenhower High School	6 ft 0 in (1.83 m)	150 lb (68 kg)	Sep 15, 2013
Alek Frascone; Point guard	Recruit ratings: Scout: Rivals: (NR)				
Femi Olujobi; Power forward	Brentwood, NY	Brentwood High School	6 ft 8 in (2.03 m)	220 lb (100 kg)	
Femi Olujobi; Power forward	Recruit ratings: Scout: Rivals: (NR)				
Overall recruit ranking: Scout: N/A Rivals: N/A
Note: In many cases, Scout, Rivals, 247Sports, On3, and ESPN may conflict in their listings of height and weight.; In these cases, the average was taken. ESPN grades are on a 100-point scale.; Sources: "Oakland Basketball Commitment List". Rivals.; "ESPN – Oakland Golden Grizzlies Basketball Recruiting 2014". ESPN.; "2014 Team Ranking". Rivals.

== Preseason ==
Preseason poll
School	Points
Green Bay (32)	357
Cleveland St. (9)	335
Detroit	239
Valparaiso	228
Wright St.	186
Milwaukee	182
Oakland	178
Youngstown St.	95
UIC	45
First place votes in parentheses.

Oakland was picked by coaches, media and sports information directors to finish seventh in their second season in the Horizon League. Senior center Corey Petros was selected to the preseason first team and sophomore point guard Kahlil Felder was selected to the second team.

From the previous season, Oakland lost seniors Travis Bader and Duke Mondy to graduation. Bader finished his college career with the most three-point field goals made in NCAA history. Redshirt freshman Artis Cleveland violated team rules in the offseason and will not return to the team.

Oakland defeated NCAA Division II member Ferris State 94–87 and National Association of Intercollegiate Athletics member Saint Xavier 87–72 in exhibition games prior to the start of the regular season. Both games were played at home at the O'rena.

== Season ==
During the season Oakland announced two players transferred to the school. Guards Martez Walker transferred from the Texas Longhorns men's basketball team and Sherron Dorsey-Walker transferred from Iowa State. Walker withdrew from the University of Texas after he was arrested on charges he assaulted his girlfriend. He is currently a walk-on for the team although that situation may change depending on the outcome of the charges. Dorsey-Walker transferred from Iowa State to be closer to his mother and younger brothers. Both players were high school teammates of Felder.

== Roster ==
The following table lists Oakland's roster as of January 10, 2015.

Number	Name	Position	Height	Weight	Year	Hometown
0	Ralph Hill	Forward	6′ 6″	238	Senior (redshirt)	Westerville, Ohio
2	Dante Williams	Forward	6′ 6″	188	Senior	Ann Arbor, Michigan
4	Jalen Hayes	Forward	6′ 7″	211	Freshman (redshirt)	Lansing, Michigan
10	Max Hooper	Guard	6′ 6″	201	Junior (redshirt)	Carmel Valley, California
11	Nick Daniels	Guard	6′ 1″	160	Freshman (redshirt)	Westland, Michigan
13	Tom Cotter	Forward	6′ 7″	223	Freshman	Williamston, Michigan
20	Kahlil Felder	Point guard	5′ 9″	176	Sophomore	Detroit, Michigan
22	Alek Frascone	Guard	6′ 2″	178	Freshman	Washington Township, Michigan
23	Tommie McCune	Forward	6′ 8″	210	Junior (redshirt)	Saginaw, Michigan
24	Percy Gibson	Center	6′ 9″	265	Senior	Detroit, Michigan
25	Femi Olujobi	Forward	6′ 8″	233	Freshman	Long Island, New York
32	Kris Crosby	Forward	6′ 7″	282	Freshman	Traverse City, Michigan
33	Collin Weaver	Guard	6′ 2″	188	Sophomore	Glendale, Arizona
42	Corey Petros	Center/Forward	6′ 10″	255	Senior (redshirt)	Macomb, Michigan
–	Dorsey-Walker Sherron	Guard	6′ 4″	200	Sophomore (redshirt)	Detroit, Michigan

== Schedule ==
Date time, TV	Opponent	Result	Record	Site (attendance) city, state
Exhibition
November 1, 2014*; 1:00 pm, ESPN3	Ferris State	W 94–87		Athletics Center O'rena (1,323); Rochester, MI
November 7, 2014*; 7:00 pm, ESPN3	Saint Xavier	W 87–72		Athletics Center O'rena (1,610); Rochester, MI
Regular season
November 14, 2014*; 8:00 pm, cyclones.tv	at No. 14 Iowa State; CBE Hall of Fame Classic	L 82-93	0–1	Hilton Coliseum (14,384); Ames, IA
November 17, 2014*; 7:00 pm	at Eastern Michigan	L 77-89	0–2	Convocation Center (863); Ypsilanti, MI
November 19, 2014*; 7:00 pm, WMYD	Western Michigan	L 71-82	0–3	Athletics Center O'rena (2,415); Rochester, MI
November 24, 2014*; 7:00 pm, Comcast	Western Carolina; CBE Hall of Fame Classic	L 79-88 ^{2OT}	0–4	Athletics Center O'rena (1,631); Rochester, MI
November 25, 2014*; 7:00 pm, Comcast	Chicago State; CBE Hall of Fame Classic	W 70–57	1–4	Athletics Center O'rena (1,377); Rochester, MI
November 26, 2014*; 7:00 pm, Comcast	Georgia State; CBE Hall of Fame Classic	L 78-83	1–5	Athletics Center O'rena (1,527); Rochester, MI
November 29, 2014*; 3:00 pm, WMYD/Comcast	Toledo	W 81–79	2–5	Athletics Center O'rena (1,482); Rochester, MI
December 3, 2014*; 7:30 pm, Comcast	Rochester College	W 84–52	3–5	Athletics Center O'rena (1,272); Rochester, MI
December 6, 2014*; 2:00 pm	at Morehead State	W 70–68 ^{OT}	4–5	Ellis Johnson Arena (2,087); Morehead, KY
December 14, 2014*; 8:00 pm, ESPNU	at Michigan State	L 61-87	4–6	Breslin Center (14,797); East Lansing, MI
December 16, 2014*; 10:00 pm, Pac-12 Network	at No. 3 Arizona	L 64-101	4–7	McKale Center (14,405); Tucson, AZ
December 20, 2014*; 4:00 pm, Fox Sports Detroit	at Pittsburgh	L 77-81 ^{OT}	4–8	Petersen Events Center (9,049); Pittsburgh, PA
December 22, 2014*; 7:00 pm, ESPN3	at Clemson	L 60-70	4–9	Littlejohn Coliseum (7,146); Clemson, SC
December 27, 2014*; 5:00 pm, BTN	at No. 15 Maryland	L 56-72	4–10	Xfinity Center (12,938); College Park, MD
January 2, 2015; 7:00 pm, WMYD/Comcast	Valparaiso	W 89–75 ^{OT}	5–10 (1–0)	Athletics Center O'rena (2,873); Rochester, MI
January 8, 2015; 7:30 pm, ESPN3	at Cleveland State	L 61-65	5–11 (1–1)	Wolstein Center (1,593); Cleveland, OH
January 10, 2015; 3:00 pm, WADL	at Detroit; Michigan Sports Hall of Fame Cup	L 54-74	5–12 (1–2)	Calihan Hall (6,522); Detroit, MI
January 15, 2015; 7:00 pm, Comcast	Green Bay	W 69–66	6–12 (2–2)	Athletics Center O'rena (1,973); Rochester, MI
January 18, 2015*; 3:00 pm, Comcast	Albion	W 83–68	7–12	Athletics Center O'rena (2,004); Rochester, MI
January 22, 2015; 7:00 pm, WMYD/Comcast	Milwaukee	W 66–53	8–12 (3–2)	Athletics Center O'rena (2,048); Rochester, MI
January 26, 2015; 7:00 pm, WMYD/Comcast	Cleveland State	W 59–56	9–12 (4–2)	Athletics Center O'rena (2,168); Rochester, MI
January 28, 2015; 7:00 pm, Comcast	Wright State	W 84–76 ^{OT}	10–12 (5–2)	Athletics Center O'rena (2,872); Rochester, MI
February 1, 2015; 12:30 pm, American Sports Network	at Youngstown State	W 96–80	11–12 (6–2)	Beeghly Center (1,512); Youngstown, OH
February 4, 2015; 8:00 pm, ESPN3	at UIC	W 91–77	12–12 (7–2)	UIC Pavilion (2,121); Chicago, IL
February 8, 2015; 3:30 pm, American Sports Network	at Valparaiso	L 76-82	12–13 (7–3)	Athletics–Recreation Center (4,267); Valparaiso, IN
February 10, 2015; 8:00 pm, TWC Sports Wisconsin	at Milwaukee	L 67-84	12–14 (7–4)	UW–Milwaukee Panther Arena (3,016); Milwaukee, WI
February 15, 2015; 3:00 pm, WMYD/Comcast	Detroit; Michigan Sports Hall of Fame Cup	W 83–78	13–14 (8–4)	Athletics Center O'rena (4,101); Rochester, MI
February 18, 2015; 7:00 pm, ESPN3	at Wright State	W 76–67	14–14 (9–4)	Nutter Center (3,738); Fairborn, OH
February 22, 2015; 3:00 pm, WMYD/Comcast	UIC	W 81–56	15–14 (10–4)	Athletics Center O'rena (3,781); Rochester, MI
February 25, 2015; 7:00 pm, WMYD/Comcast	Youngstown State	W 82–71	16–14 (11–4)	Athletics Center O'rena (2,233); Rochester, MI
February 28, 2015; 2:00 pm, ESPN3	at Green Bay	L 63-83	16–15 (11–5)	Resch Center (6,019); Green Bay, WI
2015 Horizon League Men's Basketball tournament
March 6, 2015; 7:00 pm, ESPN3	vs. UIC; Quarterfinals	L 69-72	16–16	Athletics–Recreation Center (2,341); Valparaiso, IN
2015 CollegeInsider.com Postseason tournament
March 17, 2015; 7:00 pm, Comcast	Eastern Illinois; First round	L 91-97	16–17	Athletics Center O'rena (2,609); Rochester, MI
*Non-conference game. ^{#}Rankings from AP Poll. (#) Tournament seedings in parentheses. All times are in Eastern Time.
