= 2014–15 Cleveland State Vikings men's basketball team =

American college basketball season

2014–15 Cleveland State Vikings men's basketball

CIT, Second round
- Conference: Horizon League
- Record: 19–15 (11–5 Horizon)
- Head coach: Gary Waters (9th season)
- Assistant coaches: Larry DeSimpelare; Jermaine Kimbrough; Cornelius Jackson
- Home arena: Wolstein Center

2014–15 Horizon League men's basketball standings
	Conf.				Overall
Team	W		L	PCT	W		L	PCT
Valparaiso †	13	–	3	.813	28	–	6	.824
Green Bay	12	–	4	.750	24	–	9	.727
Oakland	11	–	5	.688	16	–	17	.485
Cleveland State	11	–	5	.688	19	–	15	.559
Milwaukee *	9	–	7	.563	14	–	16	.467
Detroit	7	–	9	.438	15	–	18	.455
UIC	4	–	12	.250	10	–	24	.294
Wright State	3	–	13	.188	11	–	20	.355
Youngstown State	2	–	14	.125	11	–	21	.344
† 2015 Horizon League Tournament winner * Ineligible for postseason play due to APR penalties

The 2014–15 Cleveland State Vikings men's basketball team represented Cleveland State University in the 2014–15 NCAA Division I men's basketball season. Their head coach was Gary Waters in his ninth season. The Vikings played their home games at the Wolstein Center and were members of the Horizon League. It was the 84th season of Cleveland State basketball. They finished the season 19–15, 11–5 in Horizona League play to finish in a tie for third place. They advanced to the semifinals of the Horizon League tournament where they lost to Valparaiso. They were invited to the CollegeInsider.com Tournament where they defeated Western Michigan in the first round before losing in the second round to NJIT.

== Roster ==
2014–15 Cleveland State Vikings men's basketball team
Players
Coaches

Pos.	#	Name	Height	Weight	Year	Hometown
F	0	Derek Sloan	6 ft 5 in (1.96 m)	210 lb (95 kg)	RS Fr	Moreland Hills, OH
G	1	Andre Yates	6 ft 2 in (1.88 m)	185 lb (84 kg)	So	Dayton, OH
G	2	Myles Hamilton	6 ft 1 in (1.85 m)	190 lb (86 kg)	Jr	Cleveland, OH
G	3	Trey Lewis	6 ft 2 in (1.88 m)	190 lb (86 kg)	Jr	Garfield Heights, OH
G	4	Kenny Carpenter	6 ft 4 in (1.93 m)	180 lb (82 kg)	Fr	Detroit, MI
F	5	Jonathan Janssen	6 ft 9 in (2.06 m)	215 lb (98 kg)	Fr	Mountain Creek, Australia
G	11	Terrell Hales	6 ft 4 in (1.93 m)	185 lb (84 kg)	Fr	Detroit, MI
G	13	Dave Goodwater	6 ft 6 in (1.98 m)	210 lb (95 kg)	Sr	Cleveland, OH
G	15	Anton Grady	6 ft 8 in (2.03 m)	225 lb (102 kg)	Jr	Cleveland, OH
G	20	Kaza Keane	6 ft 2 in (1.88 m)	185 lb (84 kg)	Jr	Ajax, ON, Canada
G	21	Tim Hasbargen	6 ft 4 in (1.93 m)	200 lb (91 kg)	Fr	Munich, Germany
G	23	Khyler Fields	6 ft 2 in (1.88 m)	175 lb (79 kg)	Jr	Massillon, OH
G	31	Charlie Lee	5 ft 8 in (1.73 m)	160 lb (73 kg)	Sr	Milwaukee, WI
C	32	Aaron Scales	6 ft 9 in (2.06 m)	260 lb (118 kg)	RS So	High Point, NC
F	33	Demonte Flannigan	6 ft 7 in (2.01 m)	240 lb (109 kg)	So	Richmond Heights, OH
F	41	Vinny Zollo	6 ft 8 in (2.03 m)	230 lb (104 kg)	Jr	Greenfield, OH
F	42	Marlin Mason	6 ft 6 in (1.98 m)	220 lb (100 kg)	Sr	Detroit, MI

Head coach

- Gary Waters (Ferris State)

Assistant coach(es)

- Larry DeSimpelare (Spring Arbor)
- Jermaine Kimbrough (Virginia Tech)
- Cornelius Jackson (Marshall)

Legend

- (C) Team captain
- (S) Suspended
- (I) Ineligible
- (W) Walk-on
- Injured
- Current redshirt

Roster
Last update: 2014–11–04

== Preseason ==
Cleveland State was picked second in the Horizon League preseason poll, with nine first place votes.

Preseason poll
School	Points
Green Bay (32)	357
Cleveland St. (9)	335
Detroit	239
Valparaiso	228
Wright St.	186
Milwaukee	182
Oakland	178
Youngstown St.	95
UIC	45
First place votes in parentheses.

== Schedule ==
Date time, TV	Opponent	Result	Record	High points	High rebounds	High assists	Site (attendance) city, state
Exhibition
Nov 10*; 7:00 pm	Malone	W 69–48		27 – Lewis	9 – Grady	6 tied – 2	Wolstein Center (929); Cleveland, OH
Regular season
Nov 14*; 7:00 pm	at Iona	L 73–78	0–1	16 – Mason	9 – Grady	5 – Lewis	Hynes Athletic Center (2,008); New Rochelle, NY
Nov 17*; 7:00 pm, ESPN3	Tiffin	W 85–56	1–1	26 – Grady	8 – Mason	4 – Keane, Lewis	Wolstein Center (1,529); Cleveland, OH
Nov 19*; 7:00 pm, ESPN3	Jacksonville State; Global Sports Showcase	W 60–46	2–1	13 – Keane	8 – Mason	3 – Grady, Lewis	Wolstein Center (1,153); Cleveland, OH
Nov 22*; 4:00 pm	at Savannah State; Global Sports Showcase	L 83–87 ^{OT}	2–2	27 – Lewis	7 – Grady	4 – Keane, Lewis	Tiger Arena (1,730); Savannah, GA
Nov 26*; 7:00 pm, ESPN3	at No. 6 Louisville; Global Sports Showcase	L 33–45	2–3	24 – Lewis	5 – Lewis, Mason, Zollo	3 – Yates	KFC Yum! Center (20,887); Louisville, KY
Nov 28*; 8:00 pm	at Marshall; Global Sports Showcase	W 68–59	3–3	18 – Mason	4 – Carpenter, Flannigan, Grady, Lewis	7 – Lewis	Cam Henderson Center (4,991); Huntington, WV
Dec 3*; 7:00 pm, ESPN3	Toledo	L 54–59	3–4	21 – Lewis	6 – Lee, Mason	4 – Zollo	Wolstein Center (1,729); Cleveland, OH
Dec 7*; 1:00 pm, ESPN3	Western Illinois	W 76–54	4–4	21 – Lewis	6 – Grady	4 – Yates	Wolstein Center (1,187); Cleveland, OH
Dec 13*; 4:00 pm, ESPN3	at Bowling Green	L 57–67	4–5	14 – Lewis	7 – Lewis	4 – Lewis	Stroh Center (2,045); Bowling Green, OH
Dec 15*; 7:00 pm, ESPN3	Mount Vernon Nazarene	W 86–40	5–5	32 – Lewis	7 – Grady	5 – Lewis	Wolstein Center (1,171); Cleveland, OH
Dec 18*; 7:00 pm, ESPNU	at No. 6 Virginia	L 54–70	5–6	18 – Lewis	4 – Lee, Zollo	2 – Keane, Mason	John Paul Jones Arena (11,812); Charlottesville, VA
Dec 21*; 1:00 pm, STO	San Francisco	W 69–65 ^{OT}	6–6	17 – Grady	7 – Grady, Zollo	3 – Lee, Lewis, Zollo	Wolstein Center (1,289); Cleveland, OH
Dec 23*; 2:00 pm, ESPN3	Eastern Illinois	L 65–67	6–7	15 – Lee	7 – Grady	4 – Lee	Wolstein Center (1,169); Cleveland, OH
Dec 29*; 7:00 pm	at VCU	L 63–72	6–8	15 – Lee, Lewis	9 – Scales, Zollo	4 – Lee	Siegel Center (7,637); Richmond, VA
Jan 2; 7:00 pm, TWCS Ohio	Milwaukee	W 84–57	7–8 (1–0)	27 – Lewis	8 – Grady	4 – Lewis	Wolstein Center (1,727); Cleveland, OH
Jan 4; 4:00 pm, STO	at UIC	W 74–69	8–8 (2–0)	18 – Grady, Lee	11 – Fells	7 – Harris	UIC Pavilion (717); Chicago, IL
Jan 8; 7:30 pm, ESPN3	Oakland	W 65–61	9–8 (3–0)	14 – Yates	8 – Grady, Mason	7 – Lee	Wolstein Center (1,593); Cleveland, OH
Jan 10; 8:00 pm, ESPN3	at Valparaiso	L 56–58	9–9 (3–1)	19 – Grady	6 – Lee	6 – Lee	Athletics–Recreation Center (4,155); Valparaiso, IN
Jan 14; 7:00 pm, ESPN3	at Wright State	W 55–50	10–9 (4–1)	16 – Grady	10 – Grady	6 – Lee	Nutter Center (4,891); Fairborn, OH
Jan 17; 7:00 pm, ESPN3	at Youngstown State	W 74–61	11–9 (5–1)	29 – Lewis	10 – Grady	8 – Lee	Beeghly Center (3,385); Youngstown, OH
Jan 23; 7:00 pm, ESPN3	Detroit	W 70–66	12–9 (6–1)	30 – Lewis	14 – Grady	4 – Keane	Wolstein Center (2,803); Cleveland, OH
Jan 26; 7:00 pm, ESPN3	at Oakland	L 56–59	12–10 (6–2)	16 – Keane	10 – Grady	6 – Keane	Athletics Center O'rena (2,168); Rochester, MI
Jan 31; 2:00 pm, TWCS Ohio	Green Bay	W 76–62	13–10 (7–2)	25 – Lewis	12 – Lewis	7 – Lee	Wolstein Center (3,525); Cleveland, OH
Feb 4; 7:00 pm, ESPN3	Youngstown State	W 73–60	14–10 (8–2)	17 – Grady	13 – Grady	4 – Grady, Keane, Lee	Wolstein Center (1,731); Cleveland, OH
Feb 7; 2:00 pm, STO	Wright State	W 88–72	15–10 (9–2)	22 – Grady	8 – Mason	3 – Keane, Lee, Mason	Wolstein Center (2,733); Cleveland, OH
Feb 13; 8:00 pm, ESPNU	at Detroit	L 65–66	15–11 (9–3)	23 – Lewis	9 – Zollo	3 – Lewis	Calihan Hall (1,723); Detroit, MI
Feb 15; 3:00 pm, ASN	UIC	W 67–59	16–11 (10–3)	18 – Lewis	13 – Grady	8 – Lee	Wolstein Center (2,471); Cleveland, OH
Feb 17*; 7:00 pm, STO	at Western Carolina						Ramsey Center; Cullowhee, NC
Feb 20; 7:00 pm, ESPN2	at Green Bay	W 66–61 ^{OT}	17–11 (11–3)	21 – Lewis	11 – Grady	6 – Lee	Resch Center (4,674); Green Bay, WI
Feb 22; 3:00 pm, ASN	at Milwaukee	L 60–66	17–12 (11–4)	24 – Grady	10 – Grady, Lewis	3 – Lee	UW–Milwaukee Panther Arena (3,405); Milwaukee, WI
Feb 27; 10:00 pm, ESPNU	Valparaiso	L 53–56	17–13 (11–5)	13 – Lewis	13 – Grady	5 – Lee	Wolstein Center (4,133); Cleveland, OH
Horizon League tournament
Mar 6; 9:30 pm, ESPN3	vs. Detroit; Quarterfinals	W 70–53	18–13	17 – Lee	13 – Mason	5 – Lewis	Athletics–Recreation Center (1,650); Valparaiso, IN
Mar 7; 9:30 pm, ESPNU	vs. Valparaiso; Semifinals	L 55–60	18–14	20 – Grady	11 – Grady	6 – Grady	Athletics–Recreation Center (3,629); Valparaiso, IN
CIT
Mar 18*; 7:00 pm	at Western Michigan; First round	W 86–57	19–14	28 – Lee	14 – Grady	7 – Lee	University Arena (1,112); Kalamazoo, MI
Mar 23*; 7:00 pm	at NJIT; Second round	L 77–80	19–15	26 – Grady	11 – Grady	4 – Keane	Fleisher Center (1,404); Newark, NJ
*Non-conference game. ^{#}Rankings from ESPN/USA Today Coaches Poll. (#) Tournament seedings in parentheses. All times are in Eastern Time.
