= 2015–16 Illinois Fighting Illini men's basketball team =

American college basketball season

2015–16 Illinois Fighting Illini men's basketball
- Conference: Big Ten Conference
- Record: 15–19 (5–13 Big Ten)
- Head coach: John Groce (4th season)
- Assistant coaches: Dustin Ford (4th season); Paris Parham (4th season); Jamall Walker (4th season)
- MVP: Malcolm Hill
- Captains: Tracy Abrams; Malcolm Hill; Kendrick Nunn; Jaylon Tate
- Home arena: State Farm Center; Prairie Capital Convention Center

2015–16 Big Ten Conference men's basketball standings
	Conf.				Overall
Team	W		L	PCT	W		L	PCT
No. 14 Indiana	15	–	3	.833	27	–	8	.771
No. 2 Michigan State †	13	–	5	.722	29	–	6	.829
No. 18 Maryland	12	–	6	.667	27	–	9	.750
No. 12 Purdue	12	–	6	.667	26	–	9	.743
No. 25 Iowa	12	–	6	.667	22	–	11	.667
Wisconsin	12	–	6	.667	22	–	13	.629
Ohio State	11	–	7	.611	21	–	14	.600
Michigan	10	–	8	.556	23	–	13	.639
Northwestern	8	–	10	.444	20	–	12	.625
Penn State	7	–	11	.389	16	–	16	.500
Nebraska	6	–	12	.333	16	–	18	.471
Illinois	5	–	13	.278	15	–	19	.441
Minnesota	2	–	16	.111	11	–	20	.355
Rutgers	1	–	17	.056	7	–	25	.219
† 2016 Big Ten tournament winner Rankings from AP poll

The 2015–16 Illinois Fighting Illini men's basketball team represented the University of Illinois at Urbana–Champaign in the 2015–16 NCAA Division I men's basketball season. Led by fourth year head coach John Groce, the Illini played their home games at State Farm Center and were members of the Big Ten Conference. In November 2015, the Prairie Capital Convention Center in Springfield, Illinois hosted Illinois Fighting Illini men's basketball for five games while renovations to the State Farm Center were completed. They finished the season 15–19, 5–13 in Big Ten play to finish in 12th place. The Illini defeated Minnesota and Iowa to advance to the quarterfinals of the Big Ten tournament, where they lost to Purdue.

== Previous season ==
The Fighting Illini finished the 2014-15 Season with an overall record of 19–14, 9–9 in Big Ten play to finish in a tie for seventh place. They lost in the second round of the Big Ten tournament to Michigan. They were invited to the NIT where they lost in the first round to Alabama.

== Offseason ==
=== Departures ===
Name	Number	Pos.	Height	Weight	Year	Hometown	Notes
Ahmad Starks	3	G	5'9"	170	RS Senior	Chicago, IL	Graduated & pro for Eco Örebro
Aaron Cosby	11	G	6'3"	205	RS Junior	Louisville, KY	Graduated & transferred to Western Kentucky
Ryan Schmidt	14	G	6'0"	180	Senior	Bloomington, IL	Graduated
Rayvonte Rice	24	G	6'4"	230	RS Senior	Champaign, IL	Graduated & pro for Tezenis Verona
Austin Colbert	31	F	6'9"	200	Sophomore	Chesapeake, VA	Transferred to Old Dominion
Nnanna Egwu	32	C	6'11"	250	Senior	Chicago, IL	Graduated & pro for Erie BayHawks

=== Incoming transfer students ===
Darius Paul was immediately eligible to play during the 15-16 season due to the junior college student transfer exception rules of the NCAA. While overseas on Illinois' preseason European trip, Paul was arrested in Deauville, France on August 14, 2015 and charged with vandalism, public intoxication and resisting arrest. Head coach John Groce later dismissed Paul from the Illinois basketball team on August 21, 2015.

Khalid Lewis and Mike Thorne Jr. are immediately eligible to play during the 15-16 season due to the graduate student transfer exception rules of the NCAA. Kipper Nichols was granted release of his scholarship from Tulane on September 22, 2015. He will join Illinois before the spring 2016 semester, and will be ineligible to play as a redshirt transfer until the spring of 2017.

College recruiting information
Name	Hometown	School	Height	Weight	Commit date
Khalid Lewis; PG	Trenton, NJ	Trenton Catholic Academy / Delaware / La Salle	6 ft 3 in (1.91 m)	185 lb (84 kg)	Aug 8, 2015
Khalid Lewis; PG	Recruit ratings: ESPN:				
Kipper Nichols; SF	Lakewood, OH	St. Edward / Tulane	6 ft 6 in (1.98 m)	215 lb (98 kg)	Nov 11, 2015
Kipper Nichols; SF	Recruit ratings: Scout: Rivals: 247Sports:				
Darius Paul; PF	Gurnee, IL	Warren Township HS / Western Michigan / Lamar State College–Port Arthur	6 ft 8 in (2.03 m)	225 lb (102 kg)	Nov 12, 2014
Darius Paul; PF	Recruit ratings: Rivals: 247Sports:				
Mike Thorne Jr. C	Fayetteville, NC	Trinity Christian School / Charlotte	6 ft 11 in (2.11 m)	270 lb (120 kg)	Apr 18, 2015
Mike Thorne Jr. C	Recruit ratings: Scout: ESPN:				
Overall recruit ranking:
Note: In many cases, Scout, Rivals, 247Sports, On3, and ESPN may conflict in their listings of height and weight.; In these cases, the average was taken. ESPN grades are on a 100-point scale.; Sources:

=== 2015 recruiting class ===
On March 5, 2015 Illinois signee Jalen Coleman-Lands was named one of 26 high school seniors who participated in the Jordan Brand Classic on April 17, 2015, at the Barclays Center in Brooklyn, New York. Coleman-Lands is the second Illini to be selected to play in the Jordan Classic, joining Dee Brown who played for the Red team in 2002.

College recruiting information
Name	Hometown	School	Height	Weight	Commit date
Jalen Coleman-Lands; PG/SG	Indianapolis, IN	La Lumiere (IN)	6 ft 3 in (1.91 m)	160 lb (73 kg)	Sep 23, 2014
Jalen Coleman-Lands; PG/SG	Recruit ratings: Scout: Rivals: 247Sports: ESPN: (87)				
Aaron Jordan; SG	Plainfield, IL	Plainfield East (IL)	6 ft 4 in (1.93 m)	170 lb (77 kg)	Jan 4, 2014
Aaron Jordan; SG	Recruit ratings: Scout: Rivals: 247Sports: ESPN: (85)				
D. J. Williams; SF	Chicago, IL	Simeon (IL)	6 ft 7 in (2.01 m)	205 lb (93 kg)	Nov 5, 2013
D. J. Williams; SF	Recruit ratings: Scout: Rivals: 247Sports: ESPN: (88)				
Overall recruit ranking: Scout: 11 Rivals: 12 247Sports: 10 On3: 22 ESPN: 15
Note: In many cases, Scout, Rivals, 247Sports, On3, and ESPN may conflict in their listings of height and weight.; In these cases, the average was taken. ESPN grades are on a 100-point scale.; Sources: "Illinois 2015 Basketball Commitments". Rivals.; "2015 Illinois Basketball Commits". Scout.; "ESPN Recruiting Nation Basketball". ESPN.; "Scout.com Team Recruiting Rankings". Scout.; "2015 Team Ranking". Rivals.; "Illinois 2015 Basketball Commits". 247Sports.; "2015–16 Illinois Fighting Illini men's basketball team". On3.

== Roster ==
2015–16 Illinois Fighting Illini men's basketball team
Players
Coaches

Pos.	#	Name	Height	Weight	Year	Previous school	Hometown
SF	0	D. J. Williams	6 ft 7 in (2.01 m)	205 lb (93 kg)	Fr	Simeon High School	Chicago, IL
PG	1	Jaylon Tate (C)	6 ft 3 in (1.91 m)	170 lb (77 kg)	Jr	Simeon High School	Chicago, IL
SF	2	Kipper Nichols (redshirt)	6 ft 6 in (1.98 m)	220 lb (100 kg)	Fr	St. Edward High School	Cleveland, OH
PG	3	Khalid Lewis	6 ft 3 in (1.91 m)	185 lb (84 kg)	GS	Trenton Catholic Academy/La Salle University	Trenton, NJ
SG	5	Jalen Coleman-Lands	6 ft 3 in (1.91 m)	160 lb (73 kg)	Fr	La Lumiere School	Indianapolis, IN
PG	10	Mike LaTulip (W) (redshirt)	6 ft 1 in (1.85 m)	170 lb (77 kg)	Sr	Prospect High School	Arlington Heights, IL
PF	12	Leron Black (injured) (S)	6 ft 7 in (2.01 m)	220 lb (100 kg)	So	White Station High School	Memphis, TN
PG	13	Tracy Abrams (injured) (C) (redshirt)	6 ft 2 in (1.88 m)	185 lb (84 kg)	GS	Mount Carmel High School	Chicago, IL
G/F	21	Malcolm Hill (C)	6 ft 6 in (1.98 m)	230 lb (104 kg)	Jr	Belleville High School-East	Belleville, IL
C	22	Maverick Morgan	6 ft 10 in (2.08 m)	250 lb (113 kg)	Jr	Springboro High School	Springboro, OH
SG	23	Aaron Jordan	6 ft 4 in (1.93 m)	170 lb (77 kg)	Fr	East High School	Plainfield, IL
SG	25	Kendrick Nunn (C/S)	6 ft 3 in (1.91 m)	190 lb (86 kg)	Jr	Simeon High School	Chicago, IL
C	33	Mike Thorne Jr. (injured) (redshirt)	6 ft 11 in (2.11 m)	270 lb (122 kg)	RS Sr	Trinity Christian/UNC-Charlotte	Fayetteville, NC
F	35	Darius Paul (S)	6 ft 8 in (2.03 m)	220 lb (100 kg)	RS Sr	Warren Township High School/Lamar State College–Port Arthur	Gurnee, IL
F/C	43	Michael Finke	6 ft 10 in (2.08 m)	220 lb (100 kg)	RS Fr	Centennial High School	Champaign, IL
G	44	Alex Austin (W)	6 ft 4 in (1.93 m)	185 lb (84 kg)	RS Jr	Mount Carmel High School/Eastern Illinois	Chicago, IL
SF	45	Cameron Liss (W)	6 ft 6 in (1.98 m)	200 lb (91 kg)	So	Glenbrook North High School	Northbrook, IL

Head coach

- John Groce (Taylor)

Assistant coach(es)

- Dustin Ford (Ohio)
- Jamall Walker (Saint Louis)
- Paris Parham (Minnesota State)

Legend

- (C) Team captain
- (S) Suspended
- (I) Ineligible
- (W) Walk-on
- Injured
- Current redshirt

Roster
Last update: January 11, 2016

=== Depth chart ===
Pos.	Starting 5	Bench 1	Bench 2
F/C	Michael Finke	Maverick Morgan
G/F	Malcolm Hill	D.J. Williams	Cameron Liss
SG	Kendrick Nunn	Alex Austin
SG	Aaron Jordan	Jalen Coleman-Lands
PG	Jaylon Tate	Khalid Lewis

Updated 2015-12-10

== Regular season ==
=== Injuries ===
Coach Groce announced on July 3 that incoming freshman Jalen Coleman-Lands had suffered a stress fracture and would be held out from basketball activities indefinitely. The injury forced Coleman-Lands to miss the team's European exhibition trip at the beginning of August. However, Coleman-Lands was cleared for basketball activities at the end of September and played in the team's exhibition game against the University of Illinois at Springfield on November 8.

On July 28, Coach Groce announced that redshirt graduate student point guard Tracy Abrams had suffered an Achilles tendon rupture during summer workouts which would cause him to miss the entire 2015-16 season. The injury forced Abrams to use his second medical redshirt so he can return for the 2016-17 season for a sixth year of eligibility.

On October 8, it was announced that sophomore Leron Black would miss 4–6 weeks after having surgery to repair a meniscus tear in his knee. Black returned to the lineup during the win against North Dakota State on November 15, 2015. However, in the game against North Dakota State, Black suffered a contusion on his repaired knee. After sitting out games against Yale and University of Illinois at Chicago, Coach Groce announced on December 17, 2015 that Black would be out indefinitely due to persistent swelling and soreness in his knee.

On October 20, Coach Groce announced that junior Kendrick Nunn would miss about 8 weeks after having surgery to repair a torn ligament in his left thumb.

During the first half of the season opener loss to North Florida, junior point guard Jaylon Tate suffered a dislocated finger that required surgery later that evening.

Both Nunn and Tate returned from injuries during a win against UAB in Niceville, Florida.

During the first half of a loss to Iowa State, graduate transfer Mike Thorne, Jr. suffered a meniscus tear in his left knee. He will be out indefinitely.

== Schedule and results ==
Date time, TV	Rank^{#}	Opponent^{#}	Result	Record	High points	High rebounds	High assists	Site (attendance) city, state
European trip
Aug 11, 2015*; 1:00 pm		Waregem	W 68–63	–	16 – Black	14 – Black	2 – Tied	Sportcentrum de Treffer (417); Waregem, Belgium
Aug 12, 2015*		Netherlands national team	L 54–81	–	10 – Tied	8 – Black	5 – Tate	Topsportcentrum Rotterdam (1,500); Rotterdam, Netherlands
Aug 15, 2015*; 1:00 pm		Bretigny Select	W 95–73	–	15 – Black	10 – Black	6 – Tate	Ecole Élémentaire Joliot Curie Gymnase (544); Brétigny-sur-Orge, France
Aug 17, 2015*; 7:45:00 pm		AMW Select	W 96–77	–	21 – Black	15 – Black	6 – Tate	Halle Georges Carpentier (310); Paris, France
Exhibition
Nov 8, 2015*; 2:00 pm		Illinois-Springfield	W 104–69	–	20 – Coleman-Lands	9 – Thorne	4 – Tied	Prairie Capital Convention Center (5,833); Springfield, IL
Non-conference regular season
Nov 13, 2015*; 7:00 pm, BTN+		North Florida	L 81–93	0–1	25 – Thorne	14 – Thorne	5 – Hill	Prairie Capital Convention Center (5,186); Springfield, IL
Nov 15, 2015*; 2:00 pm, ESPN3		North Dakota State	W 80–74	1–1	21 – Thorne	8 – Thorne	5 – Hill	Prairie Capital Convention Center (5,332); Springfield, IL
Nov 18, 2015*; 6:00 pm, FS1		at Providence; Gavitt Tipoff Games	L 59–60	1–2	17 – Coleman-Lands	11 – Hill	4 – Austin	Dunkin' Donuts Center (8,069); Providence, RI
Nov 21, 2015*; 7:30 pm, BTN		Chattanooga; Emerald Coast Classic	L 77–81	1–3	25 – Hill	11 – Thorne	4 – Lewis	Prairie Capital Convention Center; Springfield, IL
Nov 23, 2015*; 7:00 pm, ESPN3		Chicago State; Emerald Coast Classic	W 82–79	2–3	17 – Finke	9 – Thorne	7 – Hill	Prairie Capital Convention Center (5,023); Springfield, IL
Nov 27, 2015*; 8:30 pm, CBSSN		vs. UAB; Emerald Coast Classic semifinals	W 72–58	3–3	18 – Nunn	8 – Thorne, Jr.	6 – Hill	Northwest Florida State College (2,222); Niceville, FL
Nov 28, 2015*; 6:15:00 pm, CBSSN		vs. No. 4 Iowa State; Emerald Coast Classic championship game	L 73–84	3–4	20 – Hill	8 – Black	5 – Lewis	Northwest Florida State College (2,222); Niceville, FL
Dec 2, 2015*; 8:15:00 pm, ESPN2		Notre Dame; ACC–Big Ten Challenge	L 79–84	3–5	19 – Hill	7 – Tied	6 – Tate	State Farm Center (14,953); Champaign, IL
Dec 5, 2015*; 2:00 pm, ESPN3		Western Carolina	W 80–68	4–5	27 – Nunn	6 – Finke	3 – Tate	State Farm Center (11,455); Champaign, IL
Dec 9, 2015*; 7:00 pm, ESPN3		Yale	W 69–65	5–5	28 – Nunn	5 – Hill	7 – Hill	State Farm Center (11,648); Champaign, IL
Dec 12, 2015*; 1:00 pm, ESPN3		vs. UIC	W 83–79	6–5	22 – Hill	5 – Tied	8 – Lewis	United Center (5,151); Chicago, IL
Dec 19, 2015*; 2:00 pm, ESPN3		South Dakota	W 91–79	7–5	34 – Hill	11 – Hill	6 – Lewis	State Farm Center (11,714); Champaign, IL
Dec 23, 2015*; 6:00 pm, ESPN2		vs. Missouri; Braggin' Rights	W 68–63	8–5	21 – Hill	11 – Nunn	4 – Lewis	Scottrade Center (14,456); St. Louis, MO
Big Ten regular season
Dec 30, 2015; 2:00 pm, ESPN2		Michigan	L 68–78	8–6 (0–1)	23 – Nunn	8 – Finke	4 – Tate	State Farm Center (13,974); Champaign, IL
Jan 3, 2016; 4:00 pm, BTN		at Ohio State	L 73–75	8–7 (0–2)	14 – Tied	7 – Tied	5 – Tate	Value City Arena (12,798); Columbus, OH
Jan 7, 2016; 8:00 pm, ESPN		at No. 5 Michigan State	L 54–79	8–8 (0–3)	15 – Morgan	7 – Finke	2 – Tied	Breslin Student Events Center (14,797); East Lansing, MI
Jan 10, 2016; 5:00 pm, BTN		No. 20 Purdue	W 84–70	9–8 (1–3)	30 – Hill	8 – Hill	3 – Tied	State Farm Center (12,246); Champaign, IL
Jan 16, 2016; 1:30 pm, BTN		Nebraska	L 67–78	9–9 (1–4)	17 – Hill	5 – Nunn	7 – Hill	State Farm Center (12,510); Champaign, IL
Jan 19, 2016; 6:00 pm, ESPN		at Indiana; Rivalry	L 69–103	9–10 (1–5)	20 – Hill	9 – Thorne, Jr.	5 – Tate	Assembly Hall (17,472); Bloomington, IN
Jan 23, 2016; 7:30 pm, BTN		at Minnesota	W 76–71 ^{OT}	10–10 (2–5)	28 – Hill	16 – Finke	6 – Tate	Williams Arena (11,026); Minneapolis, MN
Jan 28, 2016; 8:00 pm, BTN		Ohio State	L 63–68 ^{OT}	10–11 (2–6)	24 – Nunn	8 – Hill	3 – Tate	State Farm Center (13,263); Champaign, IL
Jan 31, 2016; 6:30 pm, BTN		Wisconsin	L 55–63	10–12 (2–7)	22 – Hill	4 – Morgan	2 – Tied	State Farm Center (13,609); Champaign, IL
Feb 3, 2016; 5:30 pm, BTN		at Rutgers	W 110–101 ^{3OT}	11–12 (3–7)	34 – Hill	14 – Hill	8 – Lewis	The RAC (4,500); Piscataway, NJ
Feb 7, 2016; 12:00 pm, BTN		No. 5 Iowa; Rivalry	L 65–77	11–13 (3–8)	17 – Coleman-Lands	8 – Hill	4 – Hill	State Farm Center (13,849); Champaign, IL
Feb 13, 2016; 7:00 pm, BTN		at Northwestern; Rivalry	L 56–58	11–14 (3–9)	13 – Nunn	13 – Hill	8 – Hill	Welsh-Ryan Arena (8,117); Evanston, IL
Feb 16, 2016; 8:00 pm, BTN		Rutgers	W 82–66	12–14 (4–9)	22 – Hill	10 – Hill	8 – Lewis	State Farm Center (11,323); Champaign, IL
Feb 21, 2016; 6:30 pm, BTN		at Wisconsin	L 60–69	12–15 (4–10)	20 – Hill	7 – Hill	4 – Lewis	Kohl Center (17,287); Madison, WI
Feb 25, 2016; 8:00 pm, ESPN		No. 18 Indiana; Rivalry	L 47–74	12–16 (4–11)	21 – Coleman-Lands	4 – Nunn	2 – Coleman-Lands	State Farm Center (12,857); Champaign, IL
Feb 28, 2016; 7:00 pm, BTN		Minnesota	W 84–71	13–16 (5–11)	25 – Nunn	7 – Hill	5 – Hill	State Farm Center (12,008); Champaign, IL
Mar 3, 2016; 6:00 pm, ESPN		at No. 14 Maryland	L 55–81	13–17 (5–12)	21 – Morgan	10 – Morgan	6 – Tate	Xfinity Center (17,950); College Park, MD
Mar 6, 2016; 11 am, BTN		at Penn State	L 79–86 ^{2OT}	13–18 (5–13)	39 – Hill	13 – Hill	2 – Williams	Bryce Jordan Center (9,104); University Park, PA
Big Ten tournament
Mar 9, 2016; 3:30 pm, ESPN2	(12)	vs. (13) Minnesota; First round	W 85–52	14–18	17 – Finke	6 – Hill	4 – Tate	Bankers Life Fieldhouse (16,528); Indianapolis, IN
Mar 10, 2016; 1:30 pm, BTN	(12)	vs. (5) No. 20 Iowa; Second round	W 68–66	15–18	17 – Coleman-Lands	7 – Morgan	5 – Hill	Bankers Life Fieldhouse (15,707); Indianapolis, IN
Mar 11, 2016; 1:30 pm, ESPN	(12)	vs. (4) No. 13 Purdue; Quarterfinals	L 58–89	15–19	17 – Morgan	7 – Hill	2 – Tied	Bankers Life Fieldhouse (18,355); Indianapolis, IN
*Non-conference game. ^{#}Rankings from AP Poll. (#) Tournament seedings in parentheses. All times are in Central Time.
