= 2014–15 Illinois Fighting Illini men's basketball team =

American college basketball season

2014–15 Illinois Fighting Illini men's basketball

Las Vegas Invitational champions

NIT, First round
- Conference: Big Ten Conference
- Record: 19–14 (9–9 Big Ten)
- Head coach: John Groce (3rd season)
- Assistant coaches: Dustin Ford (3rd season); Paris Parham (3rd season); Jamall Walker (3rd season)
- MVPs: Nnanna Egwu; Rayvonte Rice
- Captains: Tracy Abrams; Nnanna Egwu; Rayvonte Rice; Ahmad Starks
- Home arena: State Farm Center

2014–15 Big Ten Conference men's basketball standings
	Conf.				Overall
Team	W		L	PCT	W		L	PCT
No. 3 Wisconsin †	16	–	2	.889	36	–	4	.900
No. 12 Maryland	14	–	4	.778	28	–	7	.800
No. 23 Michigan State	12	–	6	.667	27	–	12	.692
Iowa	12	–	6	.667	22	–	12	.647
Purdue	12	–	6	.667	21	–	13	.618
Ohio State	11	–	7	.611	24	–	11	.686
Indiana	9	–	9	.500	20	–	14	.588
Illinois	9	–	9	.500	19	–	14	.576
Michigan	8	–	10	.444	16	–	16	.500
Minnesota	6	–	12	.333	18	–	15	.545
Northwestern	6	–	12	.333	15	–	17	.469
Nebraska	5	–	13	.278	13	–	18	.419
Penn State	4	–	14	.222	18	–	16	.529
Rutgers	2	–	16	.111	10	–	22	.313
† 2015 Big Ten tournament winner Rankings from AP poll

The 2014–15 Illinois Fighting Illini men's basketball team represented the University of Illinois at Urbana–Champaign in the 2014–15 NCAA Division I men's basketball season. Led by third-year head coach John Groce, the Illini played their home games at State Farm Center in Champaign, Illinois as members of the Big Ten Conference. They finished the season 19–14, 9–9 in Big Ten play to finish in a tie for seventh place. They lost in the second round of the Big Ten tournament to Michigan. They received an invitation to the National Invitation Tournament where they lost in the first round to Alabama.

== Previous season ==
The Illini finished the 2013–14 season 20–15, 7–11 in Big Ten play to finish in a tie for eighth place. They received a bid to the NIT where they advanced to the second round before losing to Clemson.

== Offseason ==
=== Departures ===
Name	Number	Pos.	Height	Weight	Year	Hometown	Notes
Joseph Bertrand	2	SG	6'6"	200	RS Senior	Sterling, IL	Graduated/Pro for Larochette
Jon Ekey	33	F	6'7"	225	GS Senior	Independence, MO	Graduated/Pro for Saitama Broncos

=== 2014 recruiting class ===
Leron Black joined the Fighting Illini as the first recruit from the Memphis, Tennessee area since the 1997–98 season when Cory Bradford suited up for the Fighting Illini. Black is the reigning Tennessee Mr. Basketball and is Illinois' highest rated recruit since Portland Trail Blazers Forward-center Meyers Leonard.

Michael Finke joins Rayvonte Rice as the second player on the Fighting Illini roster from Centennial High School in Champaign, Illinois. Finke also follows the footsteps of his father, Jeff Finke, who lettered in basketball as a forward for the 1986–87 Illinois Fighting Illini men's basketball team and then lettered in football as a tight end for the Fighting Illini from 1988–1990.

College recruiting
Name	Hometown	School	Height	Weight	Commit date
Leron Black; PF	Memphis, TN	White Station (TN)	6 ft 7 in (2.01 m)	215 lb (98 kg)	Sep 1, 2013
Leron Black; PF	Recruit ratings: Scout: Rivals: 247Sports: ESPN:				
Michael Finke; PF	Champaign, IL	Champaign Centennial (IL)	6 ft 9 in (2.06 m)	210 lb (95 kg)	Dec 12, 2012
Michael Finke; PF	Recruit ratings: Scout: Rivals: 247Sports: ESPN:				
Overall recruit ranking: 247Sports: 56 On3: 36
Note: In many cases, Scout, Rivals, 247Sports, On3, and ESPN may conflict in their listings of height and weight.; In these cases, the average was taken. ESPN grades are on a 100-point scale.; Sources: "2014 Illinois Basketball Commitment List". Rivals.; "2014 Illinois Basketball Commitment List". Scout.; "2014 Illinois Basketball Commitment List". ESPN.; "Scout.com Team Recruiting Rankings". Scout.; "2014 Team Ranking". Rivals.; "2014–15 Illinois Fighting Illini men's basketball team". 247Sports.; "2014–15 Illinois Fighting Illini men's basketball team". On3.

=== Walk-ons ===
College recruiting
Name	Hometown	School	Height	Weight	Commit date
Alex Austin; G	Chicago, IL	Mount Carmel / Eastern Illinois	6 ft 4 in (1.93 m)	185 lb (84 kg)	Jul 1, 2014
Alex Austin; G	Recruit ratings: ESPN: (85)				
Cameron Liss; F	Northbrook, IL	Glenbrook North	6 ft 6 in (1.98 m)	200 lb (91 kg)	Jul 1, 2014
Cameron Liss; F	Recruit ratings: No ratings found				
Ryan Schmidt; G	Bloomington, IL	Bloomington Central Catholic	6 ft 0 in (1.83 m)	185 lb (84 kg)	Jan 23, 2015
Ryan Schmidt; G	Recruit ratings: No ratings found				
Overall recruit ranking:
Note: In many cases, Scout, Rivals, 247Sports, On3, and ESPN may conflict in their listings of height and weight.; In these cases, the average was taken. ESPN grades are on a 100-point scale.; Sources:

== Roster ==
2014–15 Illinois Fighting Illini men's basketball team
Players
Coaches

Pos.	#	Name	Height	Weight	Year	Previous school	Hometown
G	1	Jaylon Tate	6 ft 3 in (1.91 m)	170 lb (77 kg)	So	Simeon High School	Chicago, IL
G	3	Ahmad Starks (C)	5 ft 9 in (1.75 m)	170 lb (77 kg)	RS Sr	Whitney Young High School	Chicago, IL
G	10	Mike LaTulip	6 ft 1 in (1.85 m)	170 lb (77 kg)	Jr	Prospect High School	Arlington Heights, IL
G	11	Aaron Cosby (S)	6 ft 3 in (1.91 m)	205 lb (93 kg)	RS Jr	Northfield Mount Hermon School/Seton Hall	Louisville, KY
F	12	Leron Black	6 ft 7 in (2.01 m)	220 lb (100 kg)	Fr	White Station High School	Memphis, TN
G	13	Tracy Abrams (injured) (C) (redshirt)	6 ft 2 in (1.88 m)	185 lb (84 kg)	Sr	Mount Carmel High School	Chicago, IL
G	14	Ryan Schmidt (W)	6 ft 0 in (1.83 m)	185 lb (84 kg)	Sr	Bloomington Central Catholic High School	Bloomington, IL
G	21	Malcolm Hill	6 ft 6 in (1.98 m)	230 lb (104 kg)	So	Belleville High School-East	Belleville, IL
C	22	Maverick Morgan	6 ft 10 in (2.08 m)	250 lb (113 kg)	So	Springboro High School	Springboro, OH
G	24	Rayvonte Rice (C)	6 ft 4 in (1.93 m)	230 lb (104 kg)	RS Sr	Champaign Centennial High School/Drake	Champaign, IL
G	25	Kendrick Nunn	6 ft 3 in (1.91 m)	190 lb (86 kg)	So	Simeon High School	Chicago, IL
F	31	Austin Colbert	6 ft 9 in (2.06 m)	210 lb (95 kg)	So	Gill St. Bernard's School	Chesapeake, VA
F/C	32	Nnanna Egwu (C)	6 ft 11 in (2.11 m)	250 lb (113 kg)	Sr	St. Ignatius High School	Chicago, IL
F	43	Michael Finke (redshirt)	6 ft 10 in (2.08 m)	230 lb (104 kg)	Fr	Champaign Centennial High School	Champaign, IL
G	44	Alex Austin (W) (redshirt)	6 ft 4 in (1.93 m)	185 lb (84 kg)	Jr	Mount Carmel High School	Chicago, IL
F	45	Cameron Liss (W)	6 ft 6 in (1.98 m)	200 lb (91 kg)	Fr	Glenbrook North High School	Northbrook, IL

Head coach

- John Groce (Taylor)

Assistant coach(es)

- Dustin Ford (Ohio)
- Jamall Walker (Saint Louis)
- Paris Parham (Minnesota State)

Legend

- (C) Team captain
- (S) Suspended
- (I) Ineligible
- (W) Walk-on
- Injured
- Current redshirt

Roster
Last update: 2015-02-26

=== Depth chart ===
Pos.	Starting 5	Bench 1	Bench 2	Bench 3
F/C	Nnanna Egwu	Maverick Morgan
F	Malcolm Hill	Leron Black	Austin Colbert	Cameron Liss
G	Rayvonte Rice
G	Kendrick Nunn	Ryan Schmidt
G	Jaylon Tate	Ahmad Starks	Mike LaTulip

== Regular season ==
=== Injuries ===
On September 11, it was announced that senior point guard Tracy Abrams suffered a torn ACL to his right knee during preseason workouts which will cause him to miss the entire 2014–15 season. The injury forced Abrams to use a medical redshirt so he can return for the 2015–16 season. After an 0–2 start to Big Ten Conference play, it was announced on January 6 that redshirt senior guard Rayvonte Rice suffered a broken bone in his left hand during practice and would be sidelined indefinitely. At the time of his injury, Rice was Illinois' leader in scoring, rebounds, and steals. Illinois suffered another injury that was announced prior to their game against Purdue at home on January 21. Redshirt junior guard Aaron Cosby suffered a retinal tear after being poked in the eye in his left eye during a home loss to Indiana. Cosby underwent laser surgery to repair the tear, which will sideline him up to two weeks.

=== Student-manager turned walk-on ===
On January 23, 2014 head coach John Groce announced the addition of former student-manager Ryan Schmidt to the roster as a walk-on guard after a string of injuries at the position. Schmidt is a senior from Bloomington, Illinois and played high school basketball at Bloomington Central Catholic.

=== Aaron Cosby ===
On February 20, 2015 coach Groce announced that he and redshirt junior guard Aaron Cosby have mutually decided to part ways. Cosby had not played in over a month since suffering an injury to his left eye against Indiana on January 18. While recovering from his injury, he and Rayvonte Rice were indefinitely suspended from play due to a violation of team rules on January 31. Rice returned from suspension in a home win against Michigan, however Cosby remained suspended. Despite no longer being on the roster, Cosby intends to remain enrolled at Illinois and then transfer to another school after graduating in May. Cosby previously played his first two years for Seton Hall and sat out during the 2013–14 season after transferring to Illinois.

=== 2004-05 national runner-up anniversary ===
On December 5, 2014, Illinois announced they would be releasing commemorative bobbleheads to celebrate the ten-year anniversary of the 2004-05 Fighting Illini team. The 2004-05 team finished the season as the 2005 National Runner-up with a 37–2 record, which tied the NCAA record for most wins in a season. During weeknight Big Ten Conference play at home, Illinois will release a bobblehead of the starting lineup of Deron Williams, Dee Brown, Luther Head, Roger Powell, Jr., and James Augustine.

== Schedule and results ==
Date time, TV	Rank^{#}	Opponent^{#}	Result	Record	High points	High rebounds	High assists	Site (attendance) city, state
Exhibition
Nov 7*; 7:00 pm		Quincy	W 91–62	–	20 – Hill	13 – Egwu	5 – Tied	State Farm Center (14,422); Champaign, IL
Non-conference regular season
Nov 14*; 8:00 pm, ESPN3		Georgia Southern	W 80–71	1–0	24 – Rice	7 – Hill	3 – Tied	State Farm Center (15,626); Champaign, IL
Nov 16*; 5:00 pm		Coppin State	W 114–56	2–0	18 – Tied	9 – Hill	7 – Tate	State Farm Center (12,272); Champaign, IL
Nov 21*; 7:00 pm, ESPN3		Austin Peay; Las Vegas Invitational	W 107–66	3–0	16 – Tied	6 – Tied	5 – Tate	State Farm Center (16,337); Champaign, IL
Nov 24*; 7:00 pm, ESPN3		Brown; Las Vegas Invitational	W 89–68	4–0	17 – Cosby	10 – Rice	4 – Tied	State Farm Center (11,422); Champaign, IL
Nov 27*; 4:00 pm, FS1		vs. Indiana State; Las Vegas Invitational Semifinals	W 88–62	5–0	21 – Rice	8 – Tied	4 – Cosby	Orleans Arena (N/A); Paradise, NV
Nov 28*; 9:30 pm, FS1		vs. Baylor; Las Vegas Invitational Championship	W 62–54	6–0	17 – Tied	8 – Egwu	5 – Starks	Orleans Arena (N/A); Paradise, NV
Dec 2*; 8:00 pm, ESPN2	No. 24	at No. 15 Miami (FL); ACC–Big Ten Challenge	L 61–70	6–1	22 – Rice	12 – Rice	3 – Hill	BankUnited Center (6,086); Coral Gables, FL
Dec 6*; 1:00 pm, ESPN3	No. 24	American	W 70–55	7–1	13 – Hill	7 – Egwu	4 – Tate	State Farm Center (13,924); Champaign, IL
Dec 9*; 6:00 pm, ESPN		vs. No. 7 Villanova; Jimmy V Classic	L 59–73	7–2	20 – Hill	9 – Egwu	4 – Starks	Madison Square Garden (11,617); New York City, NY
Dec 13*; 6:00 pm, BTN		vs. Oregon	L 70–77	7–3	29 – Rice	7 – Tied	4 – Tied	United Center (13,759); Chicago, IL
Dec 17*; 6:00 pm, ESPNU		Hampton	W 73–55	8–3	16 – Nunn	8 – Black	3 – Tied	State Farm Center (12,564); Champaign, IL
Dec 20*; 1:00 pm, ESPN2		vs. Missouri; Braggin' Rights	W 62–59	9–3	19 – Rice	7 – Tied	3 – Rice	Scottrade Center (20,079); St. Louis, MO
Dec 27*; 8:00 pm, BTN		Kennesaw State	W 93–45	10–3	21 – Rice	9 – Hill	7 – Tate	State Farm Center (16,158); Champaign, IL
Big Ten regular season
Dec 30; 2:00 pm, ESPN2		at Michigan	L 65–73 ^{OT}	10–4 (0–1)	19 – Hill	11 – Rice	6 – Rice	Crisler Center (12,707); Ann Arbor, MI
Jan 3; 2:30 pm, ESPN2		at No. 20 Ohio State	L 61–77	10–5 (0–2)	20 – Rice	7 – Rice	4 – Tied	Value City Arena (16,028); Columbus, OH
Jan 7; 8:00 pm, BTN		No. 11 Maryland	W 64–58	11–5 (1–2)	28 – Hill	9 – Egwu	4 – Tate	State Farm Center (12,896); Champaign, IL
Jan 11; 7:30 pm, BTN		at Nebraska	L 43–53	11–6 (1–3)	12 – Hill/Nunn	10 – Egwu	2 – Tied	Pinnacle Bank Arena (15,514); Lincoln, NE
Jan 14; 8:00 pm, BTN		at Northwestern; Rivalry	W 72–67	12–6 (2–3)	25 – Nunn	6 – Hill	4 – Starks	Welsh-Ryan Arena (7,652); Evanston, IL
Jan 18; 12:00 pm, BTN		Indiana; Rivalry	L 74–80	12–7 (2–4)	24 – Nunn	9 – Black	6 – Starks	State Farm Center (17,085); Champaign, IL
Jan 21; 8:00 pm, BTN		Purdue	W 66–57	13–7 (3–4)	18 – Hill	13 – Black	6 – Tate	State Farm Center (12,965); Champaign, IL
Jan 24; 1:15 pm, BTN		at Minnesota	L 71–79	13–8 (3–5)	18 – Tied	9 – Black	9 – Tate	Williams Arena (13,421); Minneapolis, MN
Jan 31; 12:00 pm, BTN		Penn State	W 60–58	14–8 (4–5)	27 – Hill	7 – Black	5 – Tate	State Farm Center (14,597); Champaign, IL
Feb 3; 8:30 pm, BTN		Rutgers	W 66–54	15–8 (5–5)	21 – Nunn	6 – Nunn	6 – Tate	State Farm Center (12,838); Champaign, IL
Feb 7; 11:00 am, ESPN		at Michigan State	W 59–54	16–8 (6–5)	19 – Hill	9 – Egwu	3 – Nunn	Breslin Center (14,797); East Lansing, MI
Feb 12; 8:00 pm, ESPN		Michigan	W 64–52 ^{OT}	17–8 (7–5)	21 – Nunn	12 – Egwu	4 – Starks	State Farm Center (17,087); Champaign, IL
Feb 15; 12:00 pm, CBS		at No. 5 Wisconsin	L 49–68	17–9 (7–6)	15 – Hill	9 – Egwu	2 – Starks	Kohl Center (17,279); Madison, WI
Feb 22; 6:30 pm, BTN		Michigan State	L 53–60	17–10 (7–7)	17 – Hill	5 – Rice	3 – Rice	State Farm Center (16,108); Champaign, IL
Feb 25; 8:00 pm, BTN		at Iowa; Rivalry	L 60–68	17–11 (7–8)	20 – Rice	9 – Rice	3 – Nunn	Carver–Hawkeye Arena (14,831); Iowa City, IA
Feb 28; 6:00 pm, BTN		Northwestern; Rivalry	W 86–60	18–11 (8–8)	19 – Rice	8 – Morgan	3 – Tied	State Farm Center (15,471); Champaign, IL
Mar 4; 9:00 pm, BTN		Nebraska	W 69–57	19–11 (9–8)	23 – Rice	8 – Egwu	2 – Tied	State Farm Center (17,085); Champaign, IL
Mar 7; 3:30 pm, BTN		at Purdue	L 58–63	19–12 (9–9)	25 – Rice	9 – Egwu	2 – Hill	Mackey Arena (14,846); West Lafayette, IN
Big Ten tournament
Mar 12; 11:00 am, BTN	(8)	vs. (9) Michigan second round	L 55–73	19–13	13 – Hill	9 – Rice	2 – Tate	United Center (16,028); Chicago, IL
NIT
Mar 17*; 8:00 pm, ESPN	(3)	at (6) Alabama; First round	L 58–79	19–14	22 – Hill	8 – Egwu	6 – Hill	Coleman Coliseum (2,348); Tuscaloosa, AL
*Non-conference game. ^{#}Rankings from AP Poll. (#) Tournament seedings in parentheses. All times are in Central Time.

== Honors and awards ==
On March 9, 2015, The Big Ten Conference announced most of its conference awards.

Player	Honor
Rayvonte Rice	All-Big Ten Honorable Mention
Malcolm Hill	All-Big Ten Honorable Mention
Nnanna Egwu	All-Defensive Team
