= 2016–17 Illinois Fighting Illini men's basketball team =

American college basketball season

2016–17 Illinois Fighting Illini men's basketball

NIT, Quarterfinals
- Conference: Big Ten Conference
- Record: 20–15 (8–10 Big Ten)
- Head coach: John Groce (5th season)
- Assistant coaches: Dustin Ford (5th season); Paris Parham (5th season); Jamall Walker (5th season)
- MVP: Malcolm Hill
- Captains: Tracy Abrams; Malcolm Hill
- Home arena: State Farm Center

2016–17 Big Ten Conference men's basketball standings
	Conf.				Overall
Team	W		L	PCT	W		L	PCT
No. 15 Purdue	14	–	4	.778	27	–	8	.771
No. 25 Wisconsin	12	–	6	.667	27	–	10	.730
Maryland	12	–	6	.667	24	–	9	.727
Minnesota	11	–	7	.611	24	–	10	.706
No. 23 Michigan †	10	–	8	.556	26	–	12	.684
Northwestern	10	–	8	.556	24	–	12	.667
Michigan State	10	–	8	.556	20	–	15	.571
Iowa	10	–	8	.556	19	–	15	.559
Illinois	8	–	10	.444	20	–	15	.571
Ohio State	7	–	11	.389	17	–	15	.531
Indiana	7	–	11	.389	18	–	16	.529
Penn State	6	–	12	.333	15	–	18	.455
Nebraska	6	–	12	.333	12	–	19	.387
Rutgers	3	–	15	.167	15	–	18	.455
† 2017 Big Ten tournament winner Rankings from AP poll

The 2016–17 Illinois Fighting Illini men's basketball team represented the University of Illinois at Urbana–Champaign in the 2016–17 NCAA Division I men's basketball season. Led by fifth-year head coach John Groce, the Illini played their home games at State Farm Center as members of the Big Ten Conference. They finished the season 20–15, 8–10 in Big Ten play to finish in ninth place. They lost in the second round of the Big Ten tournament to Michigan. They received an invitation to the National Invitation Tournament where they defeated Valparaiso and Boise State before losing in the Quarterfinals to UCF.

On March 11, 2017, Illinois fired head coach John Groce. Shortly thereafter, the school announced that Assistant coach Jamall Walker would coach the team in the NIT. On March 18, the school hired Brad Underwood as the new head coach.

== Previous season ==
The Fighting Illini finished the 2015–16 season with a record of 15–19, 5–13 in Big Ten play to finish in 12th place in conference. The Illini defeated Minnesota and Iowa to advance to the quarterfinals of the Big Ten tournament where they lost to Purdue.

== Offseason ==
=== Departures ===
Name	Number	Pos.	Height	Weight	Year	Hometown	Notes
Khalid Lewis	3	G	6'3"	185	RS Senior	Trenton, NJ	Graduated
Mike LaTulip	10	G	6'1"	170	Senior	Arlington Heights, IL	Graduated and transferred to Wright State
Kendrick Nunn	25	G	6'3"	190	Junior	Chicago, IL	Dismissed due to domestic battery guilty plea, transferred to Oakland

=== Incoming transfers ===
College recruiting information
Name	Hometown	School	Height	Weight	Commit date
Drew Cayce; PG	Libertyville, IL	La Lumiere (IN) / Creighton	6 ft 1 in (1.85 m)	165 lb (75 kg)	Jul 21, 2016
Drew Cayce; PG	Recruit ratings: No ratings found				
Overall recruit ranking:
Note: In many cases, Scout, Rivals, 247Sports, On3, and ESPN may conflict in their listings of height and weight.; In these cases, the average was taken. ESPN grades are on a 100-point scale.; Sources:

=== 2016 recruiting class ===
On September 16, 2015, Te'Jon Lucas of Milwaukee, Wisconsin verbally committed to attend Illinois in the fall of 2016 and signed his National Letter of Intent to finalize his recruitment on November 11, 2015. Lucas attended the NBA Top 100 camp in June 2015, had scholarship offers from California, Memphis, Purdue, and Wisconsin, and he strongly considered both USC and Old Dominion before committing to Illinois. Lucas is only the third player from the State of Wisconsin to commit to Illinois, and is the first since 1926.

College recruiting information
Name	Hometown	School	Height	Weight	Commit date
Te'Jon Lucas; PG	Milwaukee, WI	Washington (WI)	5 ft 11 in (1.80 m)	165 lb (75 kg)	Sep 16, 2015
Te'Jon Lucas; PG	Recruit ratings: Scout: Rivals: 247Sports: ESPN:				
Overall recruit ranking: 247Sports: 109 On3: 77
Note: In many cases, Scout, Rivals, 247Sports, On3, and ESPN may conflict in their listings of height and weight.; In these cases, the average was taken. ESPN grades are on a 100-point scale.; Sources: "Illinois 2016 Basketball Commitments". Rivals.; "2016 Illinois Basketball Commits". Scout.; "ESPN Recruiting Nation Basketball". ESPN.; "Scout.com Team Recruiting Rankings". Scout.; "2016 Team Ranking". Rivals.; "Illinois 2016 Basketball Commits". 247Sports.; "2016–17 Illinois Fighting Illini men's basketball team". On3.

== Roster ==
2016–17 Illinois Fighting Illini men's basketball team
Players
Coaches

Pos.	#	Name	Height	Weight	Year	Previous school	Hometown
G	0	D. J. Williams	6 ft 7 in (2.01 m)	210 lb (95 kg)	So	Simeon Academy	Chicago, Illinois
G	1	Jaylon Tate	6 ft 3 in (1.91 m)	170 lb (77 kg)	Sr	Simeon Academy	Chicago, Illinois
F	2	Kipper Nichols	6 ft 6 in (1.98 m)	225 lb (102 kg)	Fr	St. Edward High School (OH)	Cleveland, Ohio
G	3	Te'Jon Lucas	6 ft 0 in (1.83 m)	170 lb (77 kg)	Fr	Washington High School (WI)	Milwaukee, Wisconsin
G	5	Jalen Coleman-Lands	6 ft 3 in (1.91 m)	190 lb (86 kg)	So	La Lumiere School	Indianapolis, Indiana
G	10	Drew Cayce (W) (redshirt)	6 ft 1 in (1.85 m)	165 lb (75 kg)	So	La Lumiere School	Libertyville, Illinois
F	12	Leron Black	6 ft 7 in (2.01 m)	220 lb (100 kg)	RS So	White Station High School	Memphis, Tennessee
G	13	Tracy Abrams (C)	6 ft 2 in (1.88 m)	185 lb (84 kg)	GS	Mount Carmel High School	Chicago, Illinois
G	21	Malcolm Hill (C)	6 ft 6 in (1.98 m)	225 lb (102 kg)	Sr	Belleville High School-East	Fairview Heights, Illinois
C	22	Maverick Morgan	6 ft 10 in (2.08 m)	245 lb (111 kg)	Sr	Springboro High School	Springboro, Ohio
G	23	Aaron Jordan	6 ft 5 in (1.96 m)	190 lb (86 kg)	So	Plainfield East High School	Plainfield, Illinois
C	33	Mike Thorne Jr.	6 ft 11 in (2.11 m)	280 lb (127 kg)	GS	Trinity Christian/UNC-Charlotte	Fayetteville, North Carolina
G	35	Samson Oladimeji (W)	6 ft 4 in (1.93 m)	195 lb (88 kg)	Fr	William Fremd High School	Rolling Meadows, Illinois
G	41	Clayton Jones (W)	6 ft 0 in (1.83 m)	170 lb (77 kg)	Jr	Champaign Central High School	Champaign, Illinois
F	43	Michael Finke	6 ft 10 in (2.08 m)	230 lb (104 kg)	RS So	Centennial High School (IL)	Champaign, Illinois
G	44	Alex Austin (W)	6 ft 4 in (1.93 m)	190 lb (86 kg)	RS Sr	Mount Carmel High School/Eastern Illinois	Chicago, Illinois
F	45	Cameron Liss (W) (redshirt)	6 ft 6 in (1.98 m)	220 lb (100 kg)	Jr	Glenbrook North High School	Northbrook, Illinois

Head coach

- John Groce (Taylor)

Assistant coach(es)

- Dustin Ford (Ohio)
- Jamall Walker (Saint Louis)
- Paris Parham (Minnesota State)

Legend

- (C) Team captain
- (S) Suspended
- (I) Ineligible
- (W) Walk-on
- Injured
- Current redshirt

Roster

== Schedule and results ==
Date time, TV	Rank^{#}	Opponent^{#}	Result	Record	High points	High rebounds	High assists	Site (attendance) city, state
Exhibition
Oct 30, 2016*; 2:00 pm, BTN+		WashU	W 82–75		20 – Morgan	6 – Hill	5 – Tate	State Farm Center (10,359); Champaign, IL
Nov 4, 2016*; 7:00 pm, BTN+		Lewis	W 95–51		16 – Coleman-Lands	9 – Finke	4 – Tate	State Farm Center (12,753); Champaign, IL
Non-conference regular season
Nov 11, 2016*; 8:00 pm, BTN		Southeast Missouri State	W 81–62	1–0	21 – Hill	8 – Hill	6 – Tate	State Farm Center (10,790); Champaign, IL
Nov 13, 2016*; 5:00 pm, BTN+		Northern Kentucky	W 79–64	2–0	40 – Hill	12 – Hill	3 – Tied	State Farm Center (10,888); Champaign, IL
Nov 15, 2016*; 7:00 pm, BTN		McKendree	W 112–65	3–0	18 – Tied	10 – Thorne, Jr.	8 – Tate	State Farm Center (10,135); Champaign, IL
Nov 18, 2016*; 7:00 pm, ESPN3		Detroit; NIT Season Tip-Off	W 89–69	4–0	25 – Hill	7 – Thorne, Jr.	6 – Tate	State Farm Center (10,396); Champaign, IL
Nov 21, 2016*; 7:00 pm, ESPN3		Winthrop; NIT Season Tip-Off	L 80–84 ^{OT}	4–1	18 – Finke	9 – Hill	6 – Abrams	State Farm Center (9,502); Champaign, IL
Nov 24, 2016*; 2:00 pm, ESPNU		vs. No. 19 West Virginia; NIT Season Tip-Off semifinals	L 57–89	4–2	13 – Finke	9 – Black	4 – Tate	Barclays Center (2,451); Brooklyn, NY
Nov 25, 2016*; 11:30 am, ESPNU		vs. No. 25 Florida State; NIT Season Tip-Off 3rd place game	L 61–72	4–3	18 – Hill	11 – Black	4 – Lucas	Barclays Center (3,713); Brooklyn, NY
Nov 29, 2016*; 8:00 pm, ESPNU		NC State; ACC–Big Ten Challenge	W 88–74	5–3	22 – Hill	9 – Hill	4 – Hill	State Farm Center (13,481); Champaign, IL
Dec 3, 2016*; 2:00 pm, CBSSN		vs. VCU; Hoophall Miami Invitational	W 64–46	6–3	18 – Black	8 – Black	5 – Hill	American Airlines Arena; Miami, FL
Dec 6, 2016*; 7:00 pm, ESPN3		IUPUI	W 85–77	7–3	32 – Hill	9 – Black	6 – Abrams	State Farm Center (10,536); Champaign, IL
Dec 10, 2016*; 2:00 pm, BTN+		Central Michigan	W 92–73	8–3	31 – Abrams	11 – Thorne, Jr.	5 – Tate	State Farm Center (13,045); Champaign, IL
Dec 17, 2016*; 8:30 pm, BTN		vs. BYU; State Farm Chicago Legends	W 75–73	9–3	15 – Abrams	10 – Morgan	5 – Tate	United Center; Chicago, IL
Dec 21, 2016*; 6:00 pm, ESPNU		vs. Missouri; Braggin' Rights	W 75–66	10–3	21 – Hill	11 – Morgan	6 – Tate	Scottrade Center (12,409); St. Louis, MO
Big Ten regular season
Dec 27, 2016; 4:00 pm, ESPN2		at Maryland	L 59–84	10–4 (0–1)	21 – Hill	7 – Hill	2 – Tied	Xfinity Center (17,950); College Park, MD
Jan 1, 2017; 6:00 pm, BTN		Ohio State	W 75–70	11–4 (1–1)	20 – Hill	15 – Black	3 – Hill	State Farm Center (12,221); Champaign, IL
Jan 7, 2017; 4:00 pm, ESPNU		at No. 25 Indiana; Rivalry	L 80–96	11–5 (1–2)	21 – Tied	4 – Tied	4 – Lucas	Assembly Hall (16,506); Bloomington, IN
Jan 11, 2017; 8:00 pm, BTN		Michigan	W 85–69	12–5 (2–2)	16 – Morgan	8 – Nichols	8 – Lucas	State Farm Center (11,404); Champaign, IL
Jan 14, 2017; 5:00 pm, ESPN2		Maryland	L 56–62	12–6 (2–3)	15 – Morgan	4 – Lucas	9 – Black	State Farm Center (14,002); Champaign, IL
Jan 17, 2017; 6:00 pm, BTN		at No. 21 Purdue	L 68–91	12–7 (2–4)	15 – Morgan	6 – Black	5 – Hill	Mackey Arena (13,920); West Lafayette, IN
Jan 21, 2017; 1:15 pm, BTN		at Michigan	L 57–66	12–8 (2–5)	16 – Hill	5 – Hill	4 – Hill	Crisler Center (12,234); Ann Arbor, MI
Jan 25, 2017; 8:00 pm, BTN		Iowa; Rivalry	W 76–64	13–8 (3–5)	17 – Finke	7 – Tied	6 – Lucas	State Farm Center (11,787); Champaign, IL
Jan 28, 2017; 3:30 pm, BTN		at Penn State	L 67–71	13–9 (3–6)	19 – Hill	7 – Tied	7 – Hill	Bryce Jordan Center (10,202); University Park, PA
Jan 31, 2017; 8:00 pm, BTN		No. 10 Wisconsin	L 43–57	13–10 (3–7)	10 – Tied	4 – 4 Tied	2 – 3 Tied	State Farm Center (12,334); Champaign, IL
Feb 4, 2017; 3:30 pm, BTN		Minnesota	L 59-68	13-11 (3-8)	16 – Nichols	11 – Morgan	6 – Hill	State Farm Center (15,544); Champaign, IL
Feb 7, 2017; 7:00 pm, BTN		at Northwestern; Rivalry	W 68–61	14–11 (4–8)	14 – Hill	9 – Hill	6 – Lucas	Welsh-Ryan Arena (7,614); Evanston, IL
Feb 11, 2017; 1:00 pm, BTN		Penn State	L 70–83	14–12 (4–9)	14 – Hill	5 – Finke	7 – Lucas	State Farm Center (13,010); Champaign, IL
Feb 18, 2017; 1:00 pm, BTN		at Iowa; Rivalry	W 70–66	15–12 (5–9)	21 – Hill	8 – Hill	5 – Finke	Carver–Hawkeye Arena (15,400); Iowa City, IA
Feb 21, 2017; 7:00 pm, BTN		Northwestern; Rivalry	W 66–50	16–12 (6–9)	18 – Hill	10 – Morgan	5 – Hill	State Farm Center (11,206); Champaign, IL
Feb 26, 2017; 6:30 pm, BTN		at Nebraska	W 73–57	17–12 (7–9)	19 – Hill	5 – Black	6 – Abrams	Pinnacle Bank Arena (14,236); Lincoln, NE
Mar 1, 2017; 8:00 pm, BTN		Michigan State	W 73–70	18–12 (8–9)	22 – Hill	7 – Black	4 – Hill	State Farm Center (15,544); Champaign, IL
Mar 4, 2017; 11:00 am, ESPNU		at Rutgers	L 59–62	18–13 (8–10)	16 – Morgan	8 – Morgan	7 – Hill	Louis Brown Athletic Center (5,706); Piscataway, NJ
Big Ten tournament
Mar 9, 2017; 12:00 pm, BTN	(9)	vs. (8) Michigan; Second Round	L 55–75	18–14	23 – Abrams	7 – Finke	3 – Lucas	Verizon Center (12,189); Washington, D.C.
NIT
Mar 14, 2017*; 6:15 pm, ESPN2	(2)	(7) Valparaiso; First Round – Illinois State Bracket	W 82–57	19–14	25 – Hill	12 – Black	6 – Lucas	State Farm Center (4,719); Champaign, IL
Mar 20, 2017*; 8:00 pm, ESPN	(2)	(6) Boise State; Second Round – Illinois State Bracket	W 71–56	20–14	18 – Abrams	10 – Black	7 – Lucas	State Farm Center (5,713); Champaign, IL
Mar 22, 2017*; 6:00 pm, ESPN2	(2)	at (4) UCF; Quarterfinals – Illinois State Bracket	L 58–68	20–15	29 – Hill	7 – Black	6 – Lucas	CFE Arena (10,011); Orlando, FL
*Non-conference game. ^{#}Rankings from AP Poll. (#) Tournament seedings in parentheses. All times are in Central Time.
