= 2013–14 Illinois Fighting Illini men's basketball team =

American college basketball season

2013–14 Illinois Fighting Illini men's basketball

NIT Second round
- Conference: Big Ten Conference
- Record: 20–15 (7–11 Big Ten)
- Head coach: John Groce (2nd season)
- Assistant coaches: Dustin Ford (2nd season); Paris Parham (2nd season); Jamall Walker (2nd season)
- MVP: Rayvonte Rice
- Captains: Tracy Abrams; Joseph Bertrand; Nnanna Egwu; Jon Ekey
- Home arena: State Farm Center

2013–14 Big Ten Conference men's basketball standings
	Conf.				Overall
Team	W		L	PCT	W		L	PCT
No. 7 Michigan	15	–	3	.833	28	–	9	.757
No. 12 Wisconsin	12	–	6	.667	30	–	8	.789
No. 11 Michigan State†	12	–	6	.667	29	–	9	.763
Nebraska	11	–	7	.611	19	–	13	.594
No. 22 Ohio State	10	–	8	.556	25	–	10	.714
Iowa	9	–	9	.500	20	–	13	.606
Minnesota	8	–	10	.444	25	–	13	.658
Illinois	7	–	11	.389	20	–	15	.571
Indiana	7	–	11	.389	17	–	15	.531
Penn State	6	–	12	.333	16	–	18	.471
Northwestern	6	–	12	.333	14	–	19	.424
Purdue	5	–	13	.278	15	–	17	.469
† 2014 Big Ten tournament winner Rankings from AP poll

The 2013–14 Illinois Fighting Illini men's basketball team represented the University of Illinois at Urbana–Champaign in the 2013–14 NCAA Division I men's basketball season. Led by second year head coach John Groce, the Illini played their home games at State Farm Center and were members of the Big Ten Conference. They finished the season 20–15, 7–11 in Big Ten play to finish in a tie for eighth place. They advanced to the quarterfinals of the Big Ten tournament where they lost to Michigan. They were invited to the National Invitation Tournament where they defeated Boston University in the first round before losing in the second round to Clemson.

== Offseason ==
=== Departures ===
Name	Number	Pos.	Height	Weight	Year	Hometown	Notes
Sam McLaurin	0	F	6'8"	230	GS Senior	Havana, FL	Graduated/pro for Korihait (Finland)
D. J. Richardson	1	G	6'3"	195	Senior	Peoria, IL	Graduated/pro for Güssing Knights (Austria)
Brandon Paul	3	G	6'4"	200	Senior	Gurnee, IL	Graduated/pro for BC Nizhny Novgorod (Russia)
Mike Shaw	15	F	6'8"	230	Sophomore	Chicago, IL	Transfer to Bradley
Myke Henry	20	G/F	6'6"	230	Sophomore	Chicago, IL	Transfer to DePaul
Devin Langford	21	G/F	6'7"	200	RS Freshman	Huntsville, AL	Transfer to Kentucky Wesleyan
Ibby Djimde	23	F/C	6'8"	250	Sophomore	Bamako, Mali	Transfer to Southern Illinois
Kevin Berardini	32	G	6'0"	175	RS Junior	Lake Forest, IL	Graduated/transfer to Pace University
Tyler Griffey	42	F	6'8"	235	Senior	Wildwood, MO	Graduated/pro for Swans Gmunden (Austria)

=== 2013 additions ===
==== Incoming freshmen ====
College recruiting information
Name	Hometown	School	Height	Weight	Commit date
Austin Colbert; PF	Gladstone, NJ	Gill St. Bernard's School	6 ft 9 in (2.06 m)	200 lb (91 kg)	Nov 12, 2012
Austin Colbert; PF	Recruit ratings: Scout: Rivals: 247Sports: ESPN: (80)				
Malcolm Hill; SG	Belleville, IL	Belleville East High School	6 ft 6 in (1.98 m)	205 lb (93 kg)	Sep 12, 2011
Malcolm Hill; SG	Recruit ratings: Scout: Rivals: 247Sports: ESPN: (86)				
Maverick Morgan; C	Springboro, OH	Springboro High School	6 ft 10 in (2.08 m)	235 lb (107 kg)	Jun 13, 2012
Maverick Morgan; C	Recruit ratings: Scout: Rivals: 247Sports: ESPN: (78)				
Kendrick Nunn; SG	Chicago, IL	Simeon Career Academy	6 ft 2 in (1.88 m)	175 lb (79 kg)	Sep 15, 2012
Kendrick Nunn; SG	Recruit ratings: Scout: Rivals: 247Sports: ESPN: (86)				
Jaylon Tate; SG	Chicago, IL	Simeon Career Academy	6 ft 1 in (1.85 m)	170 lb (77 kg)	Oct 4, 2012
Jaylon Tate; SG	Recruit ratings: Scout: Rivals: 247Sports: ESPN: (73)				
Overall recruit ranking: Scout: 20 Rivals: 18 247Sports: 14 On3: 24 ESPN: 15
Note: In many cases, Scout, Rivals, 247Sports, On3, and ESPN may conflict in their listings of height and weight.; In these cases, the average was taken. ESPN grades are on a 100-point scale.; Sources: "Illinois 2013 Basketball Commitments". Rivals.; "2013 Illinois Basketball Commits". Scout.; "ESPN Recruiting Nation Basketball". ESPN.; "Scout.com Team Recruiting Rankings". Scout.; "2013 Team Ranking". Rivals.; "Illinois 2013 Basketball Commits". 247Sports.; "2013–14 Illinois Fighting Illini men's basketball team". On3.

==== Incoming transfer students ====
College recruiting information
Name	Hometown	School	Height	Weight	Commit date
Aaron Cosby; PG	Louisville, KY	Northfield-Mt. Hermon / Seton Hall	6 ft 3 in (1.91 m)	195 lb (88 kg)	Apr 13, 2013
Aaron Cosby; PG	Recruit ratings: Scout: Rivals: (90)				
Jon Ekey; SF	Independence, MO	William Chrisman HS / Illinois State	6 ft 7 in (2.01 m)	220 lb (100 kg)	Apr 16, 2013
Jon Ekey; SF	Recruit ratings: Scout: (82)				
Darius Paul; PF	Gurnee, IL	Warren Township HS / Western Michigan	6 ft 8 in (2.03 m)	225 lb (102 kg)	May 4, 2013
Darius Paul; PF	Recruit ratings: No ratings found				
Ahmad Starks; PG	Chicago, IL	Whitney Young HS / Oregon State	5 ft 9 in (1.75 m)	160 lb (73 kg)	May 28, 2013
Ahmad Starks; PG	Recruit ratings: Scout: (88)				
Overall recruit ranking:
Note: In many cases, Scout, Rivals, 247Sports, On3, and ESPN may conflict in their listings of height and weight.; In these cases, the average was taken. ESPN grades are on a 100-point scale.; Sources:

- Jon Ekey was immediately eligible to play during the 13–14 season due to the graduate student transfer exception rules of the NCAA.

== Roster ==
2013–14 Illinois Fighting Illini men's basketball team
Players
Coaches

Pos.	#	Name	Height	Weight	Year	Previous school	Hometown
G	1	Jaylon Tate	6 ft 3 in (1.91 m)	160 lb (73 kg)	Fr	Simeon High School	Chicago, IL
G	2	Joseph Bertrand (C)	6 ft 6 in (1.98 m)	200 lb (91 kg)	RS Sr	Sterling High School	Sterling, IL
G	3	Ahmad Starks (redshirt)	5 ft 9 in (1.75 m)	170 lb (77 kg)	Sr	Whitney Young High School	Chicago, IL
G	10	Mike LaTulip (W)	6 ft 1 in (1.85 m)	165 lb (75 kg)	So	Prospect High School	Arlington Heights, IL
G	11	Aaron Cosby (redshirt)	6 ft 3 in (1.91 m)	195 lb (88 kg)	Jr	Northfield Mount Hermon School/Seton Hall	Louisville, KY
G	13	Tracy Abrams (C)	6 ft 2 in (1.88 m)	190 lb (86 kg)	Jr	Mount Carmel High School	Chicago, IL
G	21	Malcolm Hill	6 ft 6 in (1.98 m)	210 lb (95 kg)	Fr	Belleville High School-East	Belleville, IL
C	22	Maverick Morgan	6 ft 10 in (2.08 m)	250 lb (113 kg)	Fr	Springboro High School	Springboro, OH
G	24	Rayvonte Rice	6 ft 4 in (1.93 m)	235 lb (107 kg)	RS Jr	Centennial High School/Drake	Champaign, IL
G	25	Kendrick Nunn	6 ft 3 in (1.91 m)	180 lb (82 kg)	Fr	Simeon High School	Chicago, IL
F	31	Austin Colbert	6 ft 9 in (2.06 m)	210 lb (95 kg)	Fr	Gill St. Bernard's High School	Chesapeake, VA
F/C	32	Nnanna Egwu (C)	6 ft 11 in (2.11 m)	250 lb (113 kg)	Jr	St. Ignatius High School	Chicago, IL
F	33	Jon Ekey (C)	6 ft 7 in (2.01 m)	225 lb (102 kg)	GS	Chrisman High School/Illinois State	Independence, MO
F	35	Darius Paul (I) (redshirt)	6 ft 8 in (2.03 m)	220 lb (100 kg)	So	Warren Township High School/Western Michigan	Gurnee, IL

Head coach

- John Groce (Taylor)

Assistant coach(es)

- Dustin Ford (Ohio)
- Jamall Walker (Saint Louis)
- Paris Parham (Minnesota State)

Legend

- (C) Team captain
- (S) Suspended
- (I) Ineligible
- (W) Walk-on
- Injured
- Current redshirt

Roster

== Schedule and results ==
Date time, TV	Rank^{#}	Opponent^{#}	Result	Record	High points	High rebounds	High assists	Site (attendance) city, state
Exhibition
Oct 24*; 7:00 pm		McKendree	W 101–66	–	16 – Abrams	8 – Bertrand	3 – Abrams, Tate	State Farm Center (13,006); Champaign, IL
Nov 3*; 5:00 pm		Northwood	W 83–67	–	14 – LaTulip	9 – Ekey	4 – Rice	State Farm Center (12,988); Champaign, IL
Non-conference season
Nov 8*; 7:00 pm, ESPN3		Alabama State	W 80–63	1–0	22 – Rice	10 – Egwu	3 – Abrams	State Farm Center (15,271); Champaign, IL
Nov 10*; 5:00 pm, ESPN3		Jacksonville State	W 86–62	2–0	20 – Bertrand	10 – Bertrand	8 – Tate	State Farm Center (13,506); Champaign, IL
Nov 13*; 6:30 pm, BTN		Valparaiso	W 64–52	3–0	18 – Rice	15 – Ekey	4 – Abrams	State Farm Center (13,504); Champaign, IL
Nov 17*; 5:00 pm		Bradley	W 81–55	4–0	19 – Ekey	8 – Abrams	6 – Tate	State Farm Center (15,849); Champaign, IL
Nov 22*; 8:00 pm, BTN		Chicago State	W 77–53	5–0	19 – Ekey	9 – Egwu	5 – Abrams	State Farm Center (15,488); Champaign, IL
Nov 26*; 9:45 pm, CBSSN		at UNLV	W 61–59	6–0	25 – Rice	10 – Rice	5 – Tate	Thomas & Mack Center (13,747); Paradise, NV
Nov 29*; 7:00 pm, ESPN3		IPFW	W 57–55	7–0	17 – Rice	6 – Rice	3 – Tate	State Farm Center (15,638); Champaign, IL
Dec 3*; 7:00 pm, ESPN2		at Georgia Tech; ACC–Big Ten Challenge	L 64–67	7–1	24 – Rice	9 – Ekey	5 – Tate	McCamish Pavilion (6,516); Atlanta, GA
Dec 8*; 2:00 pm, FSN		vs. Auburn	W 81–62	8–1	22 – Rice	7 – Abrams	5 – Abrams	Philips Arena (2,259); Atlanta, GA
Dec 10*; 7:00 pm		Dartmouth	W 72–65	9–1	13 – Rice	5 – Rice	4 – Abrams	State Farm Center (14,651); Champaign, IL
Dec 14*; 8:00 pm, ESPN2		vs. No. 15 Oregon	L 64–71	9–2	16 – Abrams, Rice	8 – Ekey	5 – Abrams	Moda Center (10,043); Portland, OR
Dec 21*; 4:30 pm, ESPN2		vs. No. 23 Missouri; Braggin' Rights	W 65–64	10–2	22 – Abrams	6 – Abrams, Bertrand	2 – Bertrand	Scottrade Center (21,987); St. Louis, MO
Dec 28*; 1:00 pm, BTN		vs. UIC	W 74–60	11–2	28 – Rice	7 – Egwu, Rice	4 – Abrams	United Center (13,017); Chicago, IL
Big Ten regular season
Dec 31; 2:00 pm, ESPN2		Indiana; Rivalry	W 83–80 ^{OT}	12–2 (1–0)	29 – Rice	8 – Rice	3 – Abrams	State Farm Center (16,618); Champaign, IL
Jan 4; 1:15 pm, BTN		Penn State	W 75–55	13–2 (2–0)	15 – Rice	8 – Ekey, Rice	5 – Abrams	State Farm Center (15,390); Champaign, IL
Jan 8; 8:00 pm, BTN	No. 23	at No. 4 Wisconsin	L 70–95	13–3 (2–1)	19 – Rice	10 – Egwu	2 – Tate	Kohl Center (17,003); Madison, WI
Jan 12; 8:00 pm, BTN	No. 23	at Northwestern; Rivalry	L 43–49	13–4 (2–2)	13 – Abrams	9 – Ekey	5 – Abrams	Welsh-Ryan Arena (8,117); Evanston, IL
Jan 15; 8:00 pm, BTN		Purdue	L 58–66	13–5 (2–3)	13 – Abrams	7 – Rice	5 – Abrams	State Farm Center (15,007); Champaign, IL
Jan 18; 7:00 pm, BTN		No. 4 Michigan State	L 62–78	13–6 (2–4)	15 – Abrams	5 – Rice	3 – Abrams	State Farm Center (16,618); Champaign, IL
Jan 23; 6:00 pm, ESPN		at No. 17 Ohio State	L 55–62	13–7 (2–5)	19 – Bertrand	9 – Egwu	4 – Tate	Value City Arena (16,774); Columbus, OH
Jan 26; 2:00 pm, BTN		at Indiana; Rivalry	L 46–56	13–8 (2–6)	20 – Rice	5 – Bertrand, Egwu	5 – Tate	Assembly Hall (17,472); Bloomington, IN
Feb 1; 6:30 pm, BTN		No. 15 Iowa; Rivalry	L 74–81	13–9 (2–7)	20 – Bertrand	9 – Rice	4 – Nunn	State Farm Center (16,618); Champaign, IL
Feb 4; 6:30 pm, BTN		Wisconsin	L 63–75	13–10 (2–8)	24 – Rice	9 – Rice	2 – Abrams, Rice	State Farm Center (16,618); Champaign, IL
Feb 9; 3:15 pm, BTN		at Penn State	W 60–55	14–10 (3–8)	19 – Nunn	7 – Rice	5 – Abrams	Bryce Jordan Center (7,573); University Park, PA
Feb 12; 8:00 pm, BTN		at Nebraska	L 58–67	14–11 (3–9)	23 – Rice	12 – Egwu	3 – Abrams	Pinnacle Bank Arena (15,404); Lincoln, NE
Feb 15; 7:00 pm, BTN		No. 22 Ohio State	L 39–48	14–12 (3–10)	13 – Abrams	14 – Egwu	3 – Nunn	State Farm Center (16,618); Champaign, IL
Feb 19; 8:00 pm, BTN		at Minnesota	W 62–49	15–12 (4–10)	19 – Nunn	11 – Egwu	6 – Abrams	Williams Arena (12,221); Minneapolis, MN
Feb 26; 8:00 pm, BTN		Nebraska	W 60-49	16–12 (5–10)	13 – Nunn	9 – Rice	5 – Abrams	State Farm Center (13,206); Champaign, IL
Mar 1; 1:00 pm, ESPN2		at No. 18 Michigan State	W 53-46	17–12 (6–10)	12 – Abrams	6 – Nunn	4 – Abrams, Nunn	Breslin Center (14,797); East Lansing, MI
Mar 4; 6:00 pm, ESPN		No. 12 Michigan	L 53-84	17–13 (6–11)	16 – Rice	9 – Rice	3 – Rice	State Farm Center (16,618); Champaign, IL
Mar 8; 7:30 pm, BTN		at No. 24 Iowa; Rivalry	W 66-63	18–13 (7–11)	15 – Rice	6 – Egwu, Ekey	4 – Nunn	Carver-Hawkeye Arena (15,400); Iowa City, IA
Big Ten tournament
Mar 13; 11:00 am, BTN	(9)	vs. (8) Indiana; First round	W 64–54	19–13	25 – Abrams	7 – Abrams, Egwu	2 – Abrams, Bertrand, Nunn, Rice	Bankers Life Fieldhouse (18,596); Indianapolis, IN
Mar 14; 11:00 am, ESPN	(9)	vs. (1) No. 8 Michigan; Quarterfinals	L 63–64	19–14	11 – Abrams, Rice	9 – Egwu	5 – Abrams	Bankers Life Fieldhouse (18,596); Indianapolis, IN
NIT
March 19*; 6:00 pm, ESPN2	(2)	at (7) Boston University; First round	W 66–62	20–14	28 – Rice	8 – Hill, Rice	3 – Abrams	Agganis Arena (1,327); Boston, MA
March 23*; 10:00 am, ESPN	(2)	at (3) Clemson; Second round	L 49–50	20–15	15 – Rice	6 – Egwu	3 – Abrams	Littlejohn Coliseum (10,000); Clemson, SC
*Non-conference game. ^{#}Rankings from AP Poll. (#) Tournament seedings in parentheses. All times are in Central Time.

== Rankings ==
Legend: ██ Increase in ranking. ██ Decrease in ranking. NR = Not ranked. RV = Receiving votes
Poll	Pre	Wk 2	Wk 3	Wk 4	Wk 5	Wk 6	Wk 7	Wk 8	Wk 9	Wk 10	Wk 11	Wk 12	Wk 13	Wk 14	Wk 15	Wk 16	Wk 17	Wk 18	Wk 19	Wk 20	Final
AP	NR	NR	NR	RV	RV	NR	NR	RV	RV	23	RV	NR	NR	NR	NR	NR	NR	NR	NR	NR	N/A
Coaches	RV	RV	NR	NR	NR	NR	NR	RV	RV	RV	NR	NR	NR	NR	NR	NR	NR	NR	NR	NR	NR

== See also ==
- 2013–14 Illinois Fighting Illini women's basketball team
