= 2012–13 Illinois Fighting Illini men's basketball team =

American college basketball season

2012–13 Illinois Fighting Illini men's basketball

Maui Invitational Tournament Champions

NCAA Tournament, round of 32
- Conference: Big Ten Conference
- Record: 23–13 (8–10 Big Ten)
- Head coach: John Groce (1st season)
- Assistant coaches: Dustin Ford (1st season); Paris Parham (1st season); Jamall Walker (1st season)
- MVP: Brandon Paul
- Captains: Tracy Abrams; Nnanna Egwu; Brandon Paul; D.J. Richardson
- Home arena: Assembly Hall

2012–13 Big Ten Conference men's basketball standings
	Conf.				Overall
Team	W		L	PCT	W		L	PCT
No. 4 Indiana	14	–	4	.778	29	–	7	.806
No. 7 Ohio State †	13	–	5	.722	29	–	8	.784
No. 9 Michigan State	13	–	5	.722	27	–	9	.750
No. 10 Michigan	12	–	6	.667	31	–	8	.795
No. 18 Wisconsin	12	–	6	.667	23	–	12	.657
Iowa	9	–	9	.500	25	–	13	.658
Illinois	8	–	10	.444	23	–	13	.639
Minnesota	8	–	10	.444	21	–	13	.618
Purdue	8	–	10	.444	16	–	18	.471
Nebraska	5	–	13	.278	15	–	18	.455
Northwestern	4	–	14	.222	13	–	19	.406
Penn State	2	–	16	.111	10	–	21	.323
† 2013 Big Ten tournament winner Rankings from AP Poll

The 2012–13 Illinois Fighting Illini men's basketball team represented the University of Illinois at Urbana–Champaign in the 2012–13 NCAA Division I men's basketball season. Led by first year head coach John Groce, the Illini played their home games at Assembly Hall and were members of the Big Ten Conference.

== Offseason ==
=== Departures ===
Name	Number	Pos.	Height	Weight	Year	Hometown	Notes
Sam Maniscalco	0	G	6'0"	180	GS Senior	Chicago	Graduated
Crandall Head	4	G	6'4"	190	Sophomore	Matteson, Illinois	Transferred to Southern Methodist
Meyers Leonard	12	C	7'1"	245	Sophomore	Robinson, Illinois	Drafted 11th overall by the Portland Trail Blazers
Jean Selus	25	G	6'2"	195	Senior	Montreal	Graduated

=== Additions ===
==== Incoming transfers ====
College recruiting information
Name	Hometown	School	Height	Weight	Commit date
Sam McLaurin; PF	Havana, Florida	East Gadsden (FL) / Coastal Carolina	6 ft 8 in (2.03 m)	230 lb (100 kg)	May 3, 2012
Sam McLaurin; PF	Recruit ratings: Scout: Rivals:				
Rayvonte Rice; SG	Champaign, Illinois	Centennial (IL) / Drake	6 ft 4 in (1.93 m)	220 lb (100 kg)	Apr 25, 2012
Rayvonte Rice; SG	Recruit ratings: Scout: Rivals: (85)				
Overall recruit ranking:
Note: In many cases, Scout, Rivals, 247Sports, On3, and ESPN may conflict in their listings of height and weight.; In these cases, the average was taken. ESPN grades are on a 100-point scale.; Sources:

==== Preferred Walk-On ====
College recruiting information
Name	Hometown	School	Height	Weight	Commit date
Mike LaTulip; SG	Mt. Prospect, Illinois	Prospect HS	6 ft 0 in (1.83 m)	165 lb (75 kg)	Apr 30, 2012
Mike LaTulip; SG	Recruit ratings: No ratings found				
Overall recruit ranking:
Note: In many cases, Scout, Rivals, 247Sports, On3, and ESPN may conflict in their listings of height and weight.; In these cases, the average was taken. ESPN grades are on a 100-point scale.; Sources: "2012 Illinois Basketball Commitment List". Rivals.; "2012 Illinois Basketball Recruiting Commits". Scout.; "LaTulip Accepted as Preferred Walk-On". ESPN.; "Scout.com Team Recruiting Rankings". Scout.; "2012 Team Ranking". Rivals.

== Roster ==
2012–13 Illinois Fighting Illini men's basketball team
Players
Coaches

Pos.	#	Name	Height	Weight	Year	Previous school	Hometown
F	0	Sam McLaurin	6 ft 8 in (2.03 m)	230 lb (104 kg)	GS	East Gadsden High School/Coastal Carolina	Havana, Florida
G	1	D.J. Richardson (C)	6 ft 3 in (1.91 m)	195 lb (88 kg)	Sr	Central High School	Peoria, Illinois
G	2	Joseph Bertrand	6 ft 5 in (1.96 m)	195 lb (88 kg)	RS Jr	Sterling High School	Sterling, Illinois
G	3	Brandon Paul (C)	6 ft 4 in (1.93 m)	200 lb (91 kg)	Sr	Warren Township High School	Gurnee, Illinois
G	10	Mike LaTulip	6 ft 0 in (1.83 m)	165 lb (75 kg)	Fr	Prospect High School	Arlington Heights, Illinois
G	13	Tracy Abrams (C)	6 ft 1 in (1.85 m)	185 lb (84 kg)	So	Mount Carmel High School	Chicago, Illinois
F	15	Mike Shaw	6 ft 8 in (2.03 m)	230 lb (104 kg)	So	De La Salle Institute	Chicago, Illinois
G/F	20	Myke Henry	6 ft 6 in (1.98 m)	230 lb (104 kg)	So	Orr Academy High School	Chicago, Illinois
G/F	21	Devin Langford	6 ft 7 in (2.01 m)	200 lb (91 kg)	RS Fr	Lee High School	Huntsville, Alabama
F/C	23	Ibby Djimde	6 ft 8 in (2.03 m)	250 lb (113 kg)	So	Huntington Prep School	Bamako, Mali
G	24	Rayvonte Rice (redshirt)	6 ft 4 in (1.93 m)	240 lb (109 kg)	Jr	Centennial high School/Drake	Champaign, Illinois
G	31	Kevin Berardini	6 ft 0 in (1.83 m)	175 lb (79 kg)	RS Jr	Lake Forest High School/Loyola Marymount	Lake Forest, Illinois
F/C	32	Nnanna Egwu (C)	6 ft 11 in (2.11 m)	245 lb (111 kg)	So	St. Ignatius College Prep	Chicago, Illinois
F	42	Tyler Griffey	6 ft 8 in (2.03 m)	235 lb (107 kg)	Sr	Lafayette High School	Wildwood, Missouri

Head coach

- John Groce (Taylor)

Assistant coach(es)

- Dustin Ford (Ohio)
- Jamall Walker (Saint Louis)
- Paris Parham (Minnesota State)

Legend

- (C) Team captain
- (S) Suspended
- (I) Ineligible
- (W) Walk-on
- Injured
- Current redshirt

Roster
Last update: 2012-09-01

== Schedule ==
Date time, TV	Rank^{#}	Opponent^{#}	Result	Record	High points	High rebounds	High assists	Site (attendance) city, state
Exhibition
10/27/2012*; 7:00 pm		Lewis	W 79–47	–	12 – Richardson	9 – Griffey	2 – Abrams, Paul	Assembly Hall (14,299); Champaign, Illinois
11/04/2012*; 3:00 pm		West Chester	W 75–66	–	17 – Abrams	11 – Egwu	2 – Abrams, Paul, Richardson	Assembly Hall (11,492); Champaign, Illinois
Non-Conference regular season
11/09/2012*; 7:00 pm		Colgate; Maui Invitational Opening Round	W 75–55	1–0	20 – Paul	8 – Paul	5 – Abrams, Paul	Assembly Hall (14,683); Champaign, Illinois
11/12/2012*; 7:00 pm, ESPN3		St. Francis (NY)	W 89–64	2–0	17 – Griffey	5 – Bertrand, Egwu, Griffey	6 – Paul	Assembly Hall (11,640); Champaign, Illinois
11/16/2012*; 11:30 pm		at Hawaiʻi	W 78–77 ^{OT}	3–0	25 – Paul	6 – Richardson	3 – Abrams	Stan Sheriff Center (7,550); Honolulu, HI
11/19/2012*; 11:00 pm, ESPN2		vs. USC; Maui Invitational Quarterfinals	W 94–64	4–0	26 – Paul	6 – Paul, Egwu, Abrams, McLaurin	8 – Abrams	Lahaina Civic Center (2,400); Maui, HI
11/20/2012*; 9:30 pm, ESPN2		vs. Chaminade; Maui Invitational Semifinals	W 84–61	5–0	14 – Bertrand	7 – Henry	4 – Paul	Lahaina Civic Center (2,400); Maui, HI
11/21/2012*; 9:00 pm, ESPN		vs. Butler; Maui Invitational Title Game	W 78–61	6–0	20 – Paul	9 – Richardson	4 – Paul, Richardson	Lahaina Civic Center (2,400); Maui, HI
11/25/2012*; 3:00 pm, BTN		Gardner–Webb	W 63–62	7–0	13 – Bertrand, Griffey, Paul, Richardson	6 – Bertrand, Paul	4 – Paul	Assembly Hall (12,565); Champaign, Illinois
11/28/2012*; 8:00 pm, ESPN2	No. 22	Georgia Tech; ACC-Big Ten Challenge	W 75–62	8–0	15 – Bertrand, Paul	7 – Paul	7 – Paul	Assembly Hall (12,224); Champaign, Illinois
12/04/2012*; 7:00 pm	No. 13	Western Carolina	W 72–64	9–0	14 – Paul	6 – Griffey	3 – Abrams	Assembly Hall (14,191); Champaign, Illinois
12/08/2012*; 9:00 pm, ESPN2	No. 13	at No. 10 Gonzaga	W 85–74	10–0	35 – Paul	6 – Richardson	5 – Abrams	McCarthey Athletic Center (6,000); Spokane, Washington
12/11/2012*; 7:00 pm, ESPN3	No. 10	Norfolk State	W 64–54	11–0	14 – Paul	8 – Paul	3 – Griffey	Assembly Hall (14,144); Champaign, Illinois
12/16/2012; 5:00 pm, ESPNU	No. 10	Eastern Kentucky	W 66–53	12–0	17 – Paul	9 – Paul	7 – Richardson	Assembly Hall (15,029); Champaign, Illinois
12/22/2012*; 5:00 pm, ESPN2	No. 10	vs. No. 12 Missouri; Braggin' Rights	L 73–82	12–1	23 – Paul	9 – Egwu	5 – Paul	Scottrade Center (21,933); St. Louis, Missouri
12/29/2012*; 1:15 pm, BTN	No. 12	vs. Auburn	W 81–79	13–1	27 – Abrams	8 – Abrams	5 – Abrams	United Center (18,136); Chicago
Big Ten regular season
01/02/2013; 7:30 pm, BTN	No. 11	at Purdue	L 61–68	13–2 (0–1)	15 – Paul	9 – Richardson	5 – Abrams	Mackey Arena (9,874); West Lafayette, Indiana
01/05/2013; 1:15 pm, BTN	No. 11	No. 8 Ohio State	W 74–55	14–2 (1–1)	19 – Paul	8 – Egwu	5 – Abrams	Assembly Hall (16,618); Champaign, Illinois
01/09/2013; 8:00 pm, BTN	No. 12	No. 8 Minnesota	L 67–84	14–3 (1–2)	21 – Paul	9 – Egwu	2 – Egwu, Richardson, Abrams	Assembly Hall (16,618); Champaign, Illinois
01/12/2013; 1:15 pm, BTN	No. 12	at Wisconsin	L 51–74	14–4 (1–3)	16 – Richardson	7 – Bertrand	1 – Bertrand, Shaw	Kohl Center (17,249); Madison, Wisconsin
01/17/2013; 7:15 pm, BTN	No. 23	Northwestern; Rivalry	L 54–68	14–5 (1–4)	21 – Paul	6 – Griffey	4 – Abrams	Assembly Hall (16,618); Champaign, Illinois
01/22/2013; 7:30 pm, BTN		at Nebraska	W 71–51	15–5 (2–4)	30 – Richardson	10 – Egwu	3 – Paul, Abrams	Bob Devaney Sports Center (9,556); Lincoln, Nebraska
01/27/2012; 5:00 pm, BTN		No. 2 Michigan	L 60–74	15–6 (2–5)	15 – Paul	10 – Egwu	3 – Abrams	Assembly Hall (16,618); Champaign, Illinois
01/31/2013; 6:00 pm, ESPN		at No. 13 Michigan State	L 75–80	15–7 (2–6)	16 – Abrams	5 – Abrams	6 – Abrams	Breslin Center (14,797); East Lansing, Michigan
02/03/2013; 2:30 pm, BTN		Wisconsin	L 68–74	15–8 (2–7)	17 – Bertrand	7 – Egwu, Bertrand	3 – Abrams, Paul	Assembly Hall (15,073); Champaign, Illinois
02/07/2013; 6:00 pm, ESPN		No. 1 Indiana; Rivalry	W 74–72	16–8 (3–7)	23 – Richardson	8 – Griffey	3 – Paul, Abrams	Assembly Hall (16,618); Champaign, Illinois
02/10/2013; 5:00 pm, BTN		at No. 18 Minnesota	W 57–53	17–8 (4–7)	16 – Griffey	6 – Abrams	6 – Abrams	Williams Arena (14,625); Minneapolis
02/13/2013; 8:00 pm, BTN		Purdue	W 79–59	18–8 (5–7)	18 – Richardson	12 – Bertrand	7 – Abrams	Assembly Hall (13,464); Champaign, Illinois
02/17/2013; 6:30 pm, BTN		at Northwestern; Rivalry	W 62–41	19–8 (6–7)	18 – Richardson	8 – Richardson	5 – Paul	Welsh-Ryan Arena (8,117); Evanston, Illinois
02/21/2013; 7:15 pm, BTN		Penn State	W 64–59	20–8 (7–7)	18 – Richardson	5 – McLaurin	3 – Richardson, Abrams	Assembly Hall (14,356); Champaign, Illinois
02/24/2013; 12:00 pm, ESPN		at No. 7 Michigan	L 58–71	20–9 (7–8)	10 – Abrams, Paul, Richardson	5 – Abrams, Egwu	4 – Richardson	Crisler Center (12,693); Ann Arbor, Michigan
03/02/2013; 4:15 pm, BTN		Nebraska	W 72–65	21–9 (8–8)	16 – Abrams	9 – Henry	5 – Paul	Assembly Hall (16,618); Champaign, Illinois
03/05/2013; 6:00 pm, BTN		at Iowa; Rivalry	L 55–63	21–10 (8–9)	18 – Paul	9 – Paul	4 – Abrams	Carver–Hawkeye Arena (14,566); Iowa City, Iowa
03/10/2013; 11:30 am, ESPN		at No. 14 Ohio State	L 55–68	21–11 (8–10)	21 – Paul	8 – Henry	4 – Abrams	Value City Arena (19,049); Columbus, Ohio
Big Ten tournament
03/14/2013; 11:00 am, BTN	(8)	vs. (9) Minnesota; First Round	W 51–49	22–11	25 – Paul	6 – Egwu	2 – Abrams, Paul, Richardson	United Center (N/A); Chicago
03/15/2013; 11:00 am, ESPN	(8)	vs. (1) No. 3 Indiana; Quarterfinals	L 64–80	22–12	16 – Paul, Abrams	7 – McLaurin	2 – Richardson, Abrams	United Center; Chicago
NCAA tournament
03/22/2013*; 3:44 pm, TNT	(7 E)	vs. (10 E) Colorado; Second Round	W 57–49	23–12	17 – Paul	8 – Egwu	6 – Abrams	Frank Erwin Center (13,784); Austin, Texas
03/24/2013*; 8:04 pm, TNT	(7 E)	vs. (2 E) No. 5 Miami; Third Round	L 59–63	23–13	18 – Paul	12 – Egwu	2 – Paul, Richardson, Abrams	Frank Erwin Center (14,520); Austin, Texas
*Non-conference game. ^{#}Rankings from AP Poll. (#) Tournament seedings in parentheses. All times are in Central Time.

== National rankings ==
Regular season polls
Poll	Pre- Season	Week 1	Week 2	Week 3	Week 4	Week 5	Week 6	Week 7	Week 8	Week 9	Week 10	Week 11	Week 12	Week 13	Week 14	Week 15	Week 16	Week 17	Week 18	Final
AP	NR	NR	NR	NR	22	13	10	10	12	11	12	23	NR	NR	RV	RV	RV	RV		
Coaches	NR	NR	NR	NR	22	14	10	10	15	14	13	22	RV	NR	RV	RV	RV	RV		

Legend
	Increase in ranking
	Decrease in ranking
	No change
(RV)	Received votes
T	Tied

== Season Statistics ==
Legend
GP	Games played	GS	Games started	Avg	Average per game
FG	Field-goals made	FGA	Field-goal attempts	Off	Offensive rebounds
Def	Defensive rebounds	A	Assists	TO	Turnovers
Blk	Blocks	Stl	Steals	High	Team high

Individual Player Statistics (As of February 15, 2013)
			Minutes		Scoring		Total FGs			3-point FGs			Free-Throws			Rebounds							
Player	GP	GS	Tot	Avg	Pts	Avg	FG	FGA	Pct	3FG	3FA	Pct	FT	FTA	Pct	Off	Def	Tot	Avg	A	TO	Blk	Stl
Paul, Brandon	26	25	815	31.3	435	16.7	133	328	.405	56	168	.333	113	157	.720	17	95	112	4.3	74	77	19	33
Richardson, D.J.	26	26	866	33.3	326	12.5	104	274	.380	62	184	.337	56	67	.836	18	91	109	4.2	42	32	5	41
Abrams, Tracy	26	25	726	27.9	281	10.8	101	242	.417	23	79	.291	56	78	.718	23	73	96	3.7	92	69	2	38
Bertrand, Joseph	26	2	612	23.5	219	8.4	87	166	.524	15	44	.341	30	37	.811	44	77	121	4.7	18	30	4	25
Griffey, Tyler	26	18	568	21.8	197	7.6	74	165	.448	30	91	.330	19	26	.731	31	59	90	3.5	16	22	17	15
Egwu, Nnanna	26	26	639	24.6	170	6.5	77	171	.450	1	5	.200	15	24	.625	51	71	122	4.7	15	30	34	18
McLaurin, Sam	26	8	554	21.3	111	4.3	42	87	.483	1	2	.500	26	46	.565	60	31	91	3.5	13	19	17	11
Henry, Myke	25	0	261	10.4	83	3.3	28	76	.368	14	39	.359	13	18	.722	23	22	45	1.8	4	17	7	8
LaTulip, Mike	15	0	35	2.3	19	1.3	4	9	.444	3	8	.375	8	8	1.000	0	2	2	0.1	0	1	0	0
Shaw, Mike	13	0	47	3.6	12	0.9	4	8	.500	3	6	.500	1	2	.500	1	8	9	0.7	2	1	0	2
Berardini, Kevin	8	0	9	1.1	5	0.6	0	0	.000	0	0	.000	5	6	.833	0	2	2	0.3	2	1	0	0
Langford, Devin	19	0	77	4.1	10	0.5	4	9	.444	1	1	1.000	1	2	.500	7	8	15	0.8	4	1	3	2
Djimde, Ibby	10	0	16	1.6	0	0	0	1	.000	0	0	.000	0	0	.000	1	1	2	0.2	0	0	0	0
Team																39	40	79			6		
Total	26		5225		1868	71.8	658	1536	0.428	209	627	0.333	343	471	0.728	315	580	895	34.4	282	306	108	193
Opponents	26		5225		1724	66.3	601	1412	0.426	170	486	0.35	352	512	0.688	296	610	906	34.8	312	379	70	144
