= Malcolm Hill (basketball) =

American basketball player (born 1995)

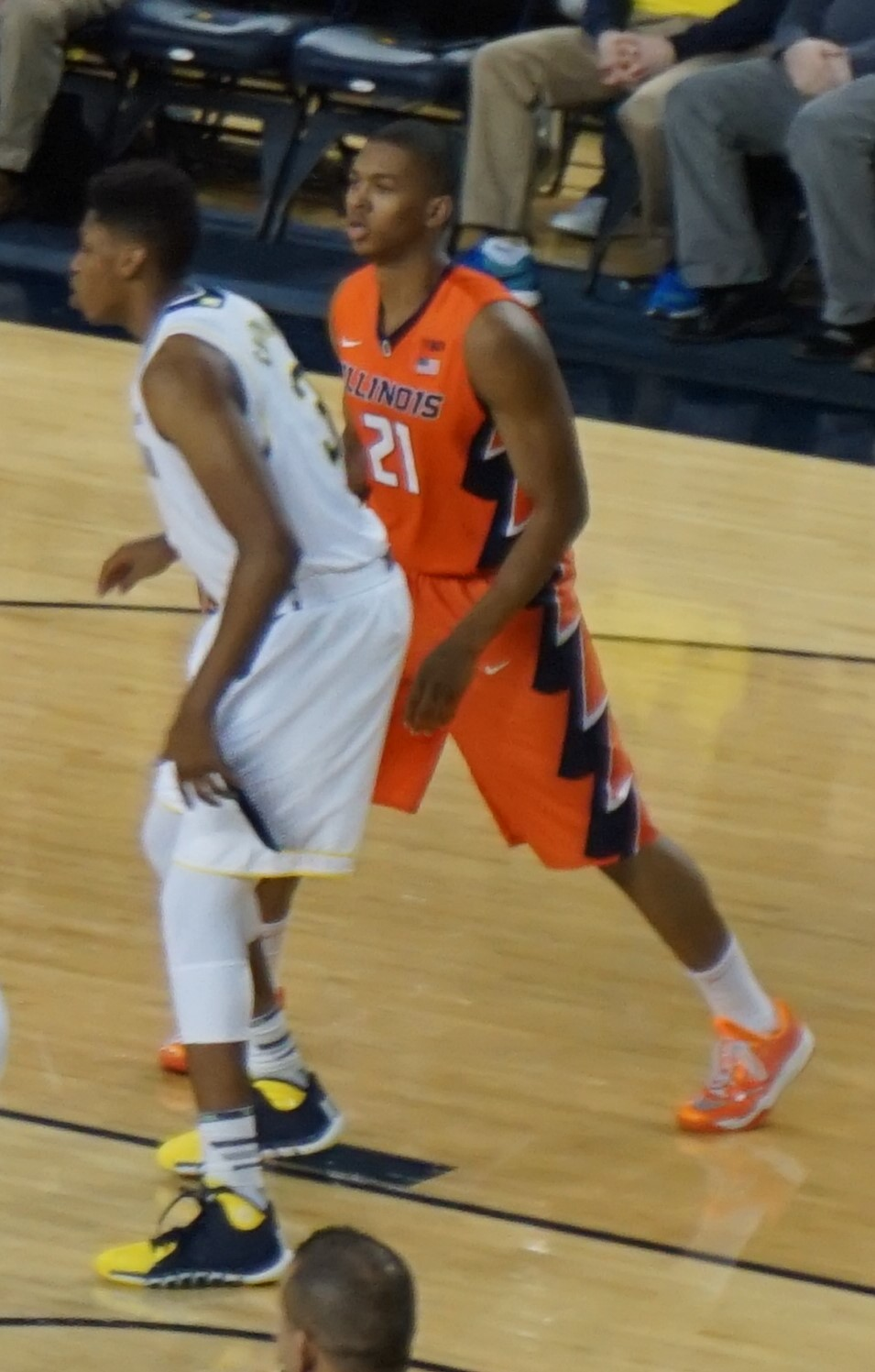
- Hill playing for Illinois in 2014

No. 21 – U-BT Cluj-Napoca
- Position: Small forward
- League: Liga Națională; ABA League; EuroCup

Personal information
- Born: October 26, 1995 (age 31) St. Louis, Missouri, U.S.
- Listed height: 6 ft 6 in (1.98 m)
- Listed weight: 220 lb (100 kg)

Career information
- High school: Belleville East (Belleville, Illinois)
- College: Illinois (2013–2017)
- NBA draft: 2017: undrafted
- Playing career: 2017–present

Career history
- 2017: Star Hotshots
- 2017–2018: Telekom Baskets Bonn
- 2018–2019: MHP Riesen Ludwigsburg
- 2019–2020: BC Astana
- 2020–2021: Hapoel Jerusalem
- 2021: Birmingham Squadron
- 2021–2022: Atlanta Hawks
- 2022–2023: Chicago Bulls
- 2022–2023: →Windy City Bulls
- 2023–2024: Birmingham Squadron
- 2024: New Orleans Pelicans
- 2024: →Birmingham Squadron
- 2025–2026: Delaware Blue Coats
- 2026–present: U-BT Cluj-Napoca

Career highlights
- All-NBA G League Second Team (2024); VTB United League scoring champion (2020); VTB United League All-Star (2020); 2× Second-team All-Big Ten (2016, 2017)
- Stats at NBA.com
- Stats at Basketball Reference

Malcolm Alexander Hill (born October 26, 1995) is an American professional basketball player for U-BT Cluj-Napoca of the LNBM, the ABA League and the EuroCup. He played college basketball for the Illinois Fighting Illini.

== High school career ==
Following his junior season in which he averaged 23.8 points and shot 44% from three-point range, Hill verbally committed to Illinois and former head coach Bruce Weber on September 12, 2011. Prior to verbally committing, Hill listed Indiana, Michigan, Missouri, Ohio State, Providence, UCLA, Xavier, and Wisconsin as the other schools he had considered.

During his senior season, Hill broke his previous single season scoring mark he set during his junior season increasing his scoring total from 666 points to 708 total points. He averaged 25.3 points, 6.1 rebounds 2.3 steals and 1.9 blocks during his final year at Belleville, and also finished in third place for Mr. Illinois Basketball voting, finishing behind Simeon's Jabari Parker and Whitney Young's Jahlil Okafor.

After head coach John Groce was hired on March 29, 2012, Hill reaffirmed his verbal commitment to Illinois, and officially signed his National Letter of Intent on November 14, 2012.

College recruiting
Name	Hometown	School	Height	Weight	Commit date
Malcolm Hill; SG	Belleville, Illinois	Belleville East (Illinois)	6 ft 6 in (1.98 m)	210 lb (95 kg)	Sep 12, 2011
Malcolm Hill; SG	Recruit ratings: Scout: Rivals: 247Sports: (86)				
Overall recruit ranking: Scout: 72, 17 (SG) Rivals: 62, 13 (SG) ESPN: 66, 16 (SG)
Note: In many cases, Scout, Rivals, 247Sports, On3, and ESPN may conflict in their listings of height and weight.; In these cases, the average was taken. ESPN grades are on a 100-point scale.; Sources: "2013 Illinois Basketball Commitment List". Rivals.; "2013 Illinois Basketball Commitment List". Scout.; "2013 Illinois Basketball Commitment List". ESPN.; "Scout.com Team Recruiting Rankings". Scout.; "2013 Team Ranking". Rivals.

== College career ==
Hill made his first start, along with fellow freshman Kendrick Nunn, for the Fighting Illini on February 9, 2014, against Penn State, scoring 11 points and helping the team end an 8-game losing streak.

On January 7, 2015, Hill scored a career-high 28 points as a sophomore to lead the Fighting Illini to a win at home against 11th-ranked Maryland when Illinois' leading scorer Rayvonte Rice was sidelined with a broken hand.

As a junior, Hill was named one of ten finalists for the 2016 Jerry West Award which is awarded by the Naismith Memorial Basketball Hall of Fame to the best collegiate shooting guard in the United States. In a double-overtime loss to Penn State at the end of the 2015–16 Big Ten Conference men's basketball season, Hill set another career high scoring 39 points. Hill's 39 points were the most since Brandon Paul scored 43 points against Ohio State in 2012 and the seventh most points scored by an Illini player in program history. Following his junior season, Hill became the only Illinois basketball player to record 600 points, 200 rebounds and 100 assists in a single season. On November 13, 2016, Hill bested that career mark with 40 points in a 79–64 victory over Northern Kentucky. Following his senior season, Hill was invited to participate in the Portsmouth Invitational Tournament, which is held annually in Portsmouth, Virginia to showcase college basketball's best seniors.

== Professional career ==
=== Star Hotshots (2017) ===
After going undrafted in the 2017 NBA draft, Hill joined the Oklahoma City Thunder for the 2017 NBA Summer League and in July, he signed with the Star Hotshots of the Philippine Basketball Association as their import for the 2017 PBA Governors' Cup, where he averaged 26 points, 11.7 rebounds and 3 assists.

=== Telekom Baskets Bonn (2017–2018) ===
In September 2017, Hill signed with Telekom Baskets Bonn of the German Basketball Bundesliga.

=== MHP Riesen Ludwigsburg (2018–2019) ===
After his first season in Germany, Hill joined the Utah Jazz for the 2018 NBA Summer League and in October, 2018, he signed with MHP Riesen Ludwigsburg for the 2018–19 Basketball Bundesliga season.

=== BC Astana (2019–2020) ===
On August 16, 2019, Hill signed with BC Astana of the Kazakhstan Championship, where he averaged 20.2 points, 4 rebounds and 3.6 assists per game.

Hill joined House of 'Paign, a team composed primarily of Illinois alumni in The Basketball Tournament 2020. He scored 14 points and had four rebounds in a 76–53 win over War Tampa in the first round.

=== Hapoel Jerusalem (2020–2021) ===
On August 17, 2020, Hill signed with Hapoel Jerusalem of the Israeli Basketball Premier League and the Basketball Champions League.

=== Birmingham Squadron (2021) ===
On October 9, 2021, Hill signed with the New Orleans Pelicans. However, he was waived on October 12. On October 25, he signed with the Birmingham Squadron as an affiliate player. In 14 games, he averaged 16.9 points, 6.1 rebounds, 1.5 assists and 1.6 steals in 31.6 minutes per game.

=== Atlanta Hawks (2021–2022) ===
On December 22, 2021, Hill signed a 10-day contract with the Atlanta Hawks. In his 3 appearances, he averaged 5.7 points, 2 rebounds and 0.3 assist in 15.3 minutes per game.

=== Chicago Bulls (2022–2023) ===
On January 14, 2022, Hill signed a 10-day contract with the Chicago Bulls. On January 19, he signed a two-way contract with the team.

On September 7, 2022, Hill re-signed with the Bulls on a new two-way contract. On February 21, 2023, he was waived by the Bulls.

=== New Orleans Pelicans / Return to Birmingham (2023–2024) ===
On February 24, 2023, Hill was re-acquired by the Birmingham Squadron. On September 30, he signed with the New Orleans Pelicans, but was waived on October 22. Eight days later, he re-signed with Birmingham.

On January 27, 2024, Hill signed a 10-day contract with the New Orleans Pelicans, but didn't play for them and on February 8, he returned to Birmingham. On February 22, he signed a two-way contract with the Pelicans and on October 21, he was waived by the Pelicans.

=== U-BT Cluj-Napoca ===
On June 22, 2026, Hill signed with Romanian side U-BT Cluj-Napoca.

== Career statistics ==
Legend
GP	Games played	GS	Games started	MPG	Minutes per game
FG%	Field goal percentage	3P%	3-point field goal percentage	FT%	Free throw percentage
RPG	Rebounds per game	APG	Assists per game	SPG	Steals per game
BPG	Blocks per game	PPG	Points per game	**Bold**	Career high

=== NBA ===
==== Regular season ====
Year	Team	GP	GS	MPG	FG%	3P%	FT%	RPG	APG	SPG	BPG	PPG
2021–22	Atlanta	3	0	15.3	**.625**	**.600**	**1.000**	**2.0**	.3	**1.3**	**.3**	**5.7**
2021–22	Chicago	**16**	0	10.4	.432	.323	.700	1.8	**.4**	.2	.1	3.4
2022–23	Chicago	5	0	1.8	.500	.333	—	.6	.0	.0	.0	1.0
Career		24	0	9.2	.464	.359	.786	1.6	.3	.3	.1	3.2

=== College ===
Year	Team	GP	GS	MPG	FG%	3P%	FT%	RPG	APG	SPG	BPG	PPG
2013–14	Illinois	**35**	12	14.1	.383	.341	.770	2.4	.7	.3	.1	4.4
2014–15	Illinois	33	32	30.6	**.443**	**.389**	.781	4.8	1.3	.8	.2	14.4
2015–16	Illinois	34	34	**35.1**	.436	.314	**.821**	**6.6**	**3.3**	**1.2**	**.4**	**18.1**
2016–17	Illinois	**35**	**35**	33.3	.434	.355	.784	5.1	2.9	**1.2**	**.4**	17.2
Career		137	113	28.2	.433	.351	.795	4.7	2.1	.9	.3	13.5

== International career ==
In June 2015, Hill was among the 22 players who earned an invitation to the training camp for the 2015 U.S. Pan American Men's Basketball team at the United States Olympic Training Center in Colorado Springs, Colorado. Competition took place July 21–25 in Toronto, Ontario, Canada. However, Hill was not selected for the final roster.

== Personal life ==
Born in St. Louis, Missouri, Hill moved with his family to a nearby Metro East suburb Belleville, Illinois when he was four years old. Up until fifth grade, Hill also played soccer and baseball, but chose to focus on basketball. Hill's father, Malcolm, played NCAA Division II basketball for UMSL Tritons during the early 1990s.

During the summer of 2012, Hill was diagnosed with Thoracic outlet syndrome, and underwent surgery to repair the blood clot in his upper right arm. Hill took several months to recover from the operation and made a full recovery.
