= Jaylon Tate =

American basketball player (born 1995)

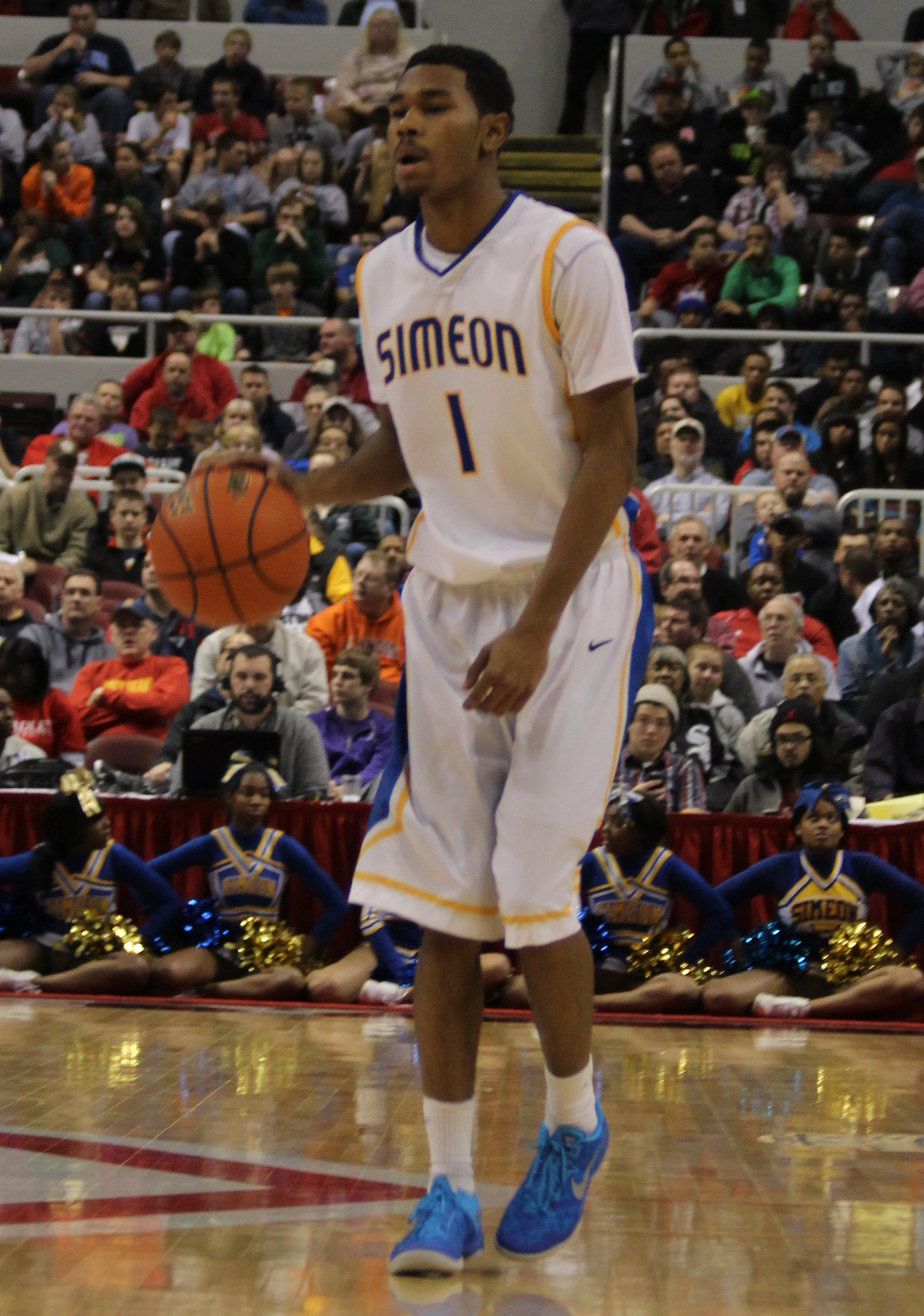
- Jaylon Tate in the 2013 Class 4A Illinois High School Association championship game

No. 0 – Szedeák
- Position: Point guard
- League: Nemzeti Bajnokság I/A

Personal information
- Born: January 16, 1995 (age 31) Chicago, Illinois
- Listed height: 6 ft 3 in (1.91 m)
- Listed weight: 170 lb (77 kg)

Career information
- High school: Simeon (Chicago, Illinois)
- College: Illinois (2013–2017)
- NBA draft: 2017: undrafted
- Playing career: 2017–present

Career history
- 2017–2018: Niagara River Lions
- 2018–2019: Pyrintö
- 2019: BK Ventspils
- 2019–2020: London Lightning
- 2021: Santa Cruz Warriors
- 2021: South Bay Lakers
- 2022–2023: London Lightning
- 2023–2024: CSM Galati
- 2024–present: Szedeák

Career highlights
- NBL Canada Rookie of the Year (2018)

Jaylon Tate (born January 16, 1995) is an American professional basketball player for Szedeák of the Nemzeti Bajnokság I/A. Tate played college basketball for the University of Illinois.

== High school career ==
Tate attended De La Salle Institute for his first two years of high school and later transferred to Simeon Career Academy. Along with teammates Jabari Parker and Kendrick Nunn, Simeon won consecutive Illinois High School Association state championships in 2012 and 2013.

After his official visit to Illinois, Tate verbally committed to the program and former head coach John Groce in October 2012. Tate played on the AAU circuit with the Meanstreets, coached by Tai Streets.

College recruiting
Name	Hometown	School	Height	Weight	Commit date
Jaylon Tate; SG	Chicago, IL	Simeon Career Academy	6 ft 1 in (1.85 m)	170 lb (77 kg)	Oct 4, 2012
Jaylon Tate; SG	Recruit ratings: Scout: Rivals: 247Sports: (73)				
Overall recruit ranking:
Note: In many cases, Scout, Rivals, 247Sports, On3, and ESPN may conflict in their listings of height and weight.; In these cases, the average was taken. ESPN grades are on a 100-point scale.; Sources: "Illinois 2013 Basketball Commitments". Rivals.; "ESPN Recruiting Nation Basketball". ESPN.; "2013 Team Ranking". Rivals.; "Illinois 2013 Basketball Commits". 247Sports.

== College career ==
At Illinois, Tate led his team in assists his sophomore year and assist to turnover ratio his senior year. As a junior, Tate underwent surgery to repair a dislocated finger. Tate was named All-Academic Big Ten during his junior and senior seasons.

=== College statistics ===
Legend
GP	Games played	GS	Games started	MPG	Minutes per game
FG%	Field goal percentage	3P%	3-point field goal percentage	FT%	Free throw percentage
RPG	Rebounds per game	APG	Assists per game	SPG	Steals per game
BPG	Blocks per game	PPG	Points per game	**Bold**	Career high

Year	Team	GP	GS	MPG	FG%	3P%	FT%	RPG	APG	SPG	BPG	PPG
2013–14	Illinois	33	0	12.2	26.3	4.3	65.5	.9	1.9	0.4	0.1	1.8
2014–15	Illinois	32	13	20.4	36.8	8.3	84.3	1.2	2.9	0.8	0.1	3.6
2015–16	Illinois	30	15	17.5	36.7	18.2	63.0	1.3	2.5	.4	0.1	1.8
2016–17	Illinois	26	7	15.7	38.3	18.2	68.6	1.3	2.8	0.5	0.1	2.3

== Professional career ==
In October 2017, Tate signed with the Niagara River Lions of the National Basketball League of Canada (NBLC). Following the 2017–18 NBL Canada season, Tate was named Rookie of the Year, leading the league with 7.53 assists per game and also averaging 13.1 points per game. He was also named to the Third Team All-NBLC. In July 2018, Tate signed with Pyrintö of the Finnish Korisliiga for the 2018–19 season.

He spent part of the 2019–20 season with the London Lightning, playing 5 games with the team. In October 2021, Tate joined the Santa Cruz Warriors of the NBA G League after a successful tryout. However, he was waived on December 17. Three days later, he was claimed off waivers by the South Bay Lakers. On December 22, 2021, Tate was waived by the South Bay Lakers.

On January 3, 2022, Tate was acquired by the Memphis Hustle of the NBA G League. However, before joining Memphis, he returned to London Lightning.

On December 6, 2024, Tate signed with Szedeák of the Nemzeti Bajnokság I/A.
