= Tracy Abrams =

American basketball player (born 1992)

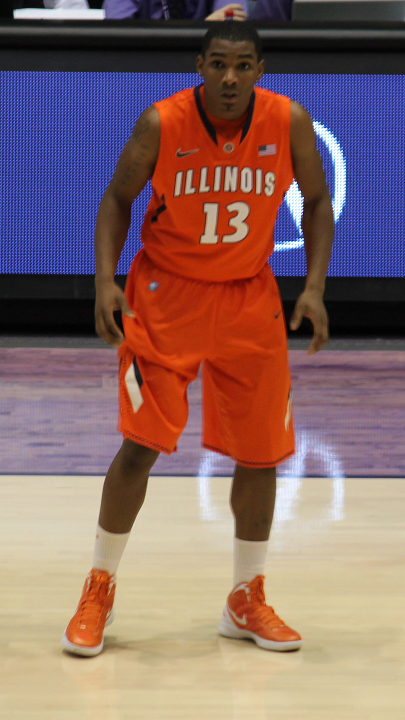
- Abrams in 2012

Personal information
- Born: February 6, 1992 (age 34) Chicago, Illinois, U.S.
- Listed height: 6 ft 2 in (1.88 m)
- Listed weight: 185 lb (84 kg)

Career information
- High school: Mount Carmel (Chicago, Illinois)
- College: Illinois (2011–2017)
- NBA draft: 2017: undrafted
- Playing career: 2017–2019
- Position: Point guard
- Number: 3

Career history
- 2017–2018: APOP Paphos
- 2018–2019: KK Sloboda Užice

Tracy Maurice Abrams Jr. (born February 6, 1992) is an American basketball player who last played for KK Sloboda Užice of the Basketball League of Serbia. Abrams is from Chicago, Illinois, and played college basketball for the Illinois Fighting Illini.

== High school career ==
Abrams attended Mount Carmel High School, where he was a four-year varsity basketball player and helped lead his team to 89 total wins. During high school, Abrams played on the AAU circuit with the Mac Irvin Fire and the Illinois Wolves.

In March 2010, Abrams was selected, along with two future Illinois teammates Meyers Leonard and Jereme Richmond to attend tryouts for the USA Basketball U18 National Team that competed in the FIBA Americas Under-18 Championship in San Antonio.

=== Recruiting ===
Regarded as a four-star recruit by Rivals.com, Abrams was ranked as the No. 58 athlete in the nation. In December 2008, as the top high school sophomore in Illinois, Abrams committed to the University of Illinois to play for then head coach Bruce Weber over scholarship offers from Indiana University, University of Kentucky, and University of Tennessee. His recruitment was primarily handled by then Illinois assistant coach Jerrance Howard

College recruiting
| Name | Hometown | School | Height | Weight | Commit date |
|---|---|---|---|---|---|
| Tracy Abrams; PG | Chicago, IL | Mount Carmel | 6 ft 1 in (1.85 m) | 175 lb (79 kg) | Dec 18, 2008 |
| Tracy Abrams; PG | Recruit ratings: Scout: Rivals: (92) | | | | |
Overall recruit ranking: Scout: 13 (PG) Rivals: 13 (PG) ESPN: 18 (PG)
Note: In many cases, Scout, Rivals, 247Sports, On3, and ESPN may conflict in their listings of height and weight.; In these cases, the average was taken. ESPN grades are on a 100-point scale.; Sources: "Illinois Commit List for 2011". Rivals.; "Men's Basketball Recruiting". Scout.; "ESPN – Illinois Fighting Illini Basketball Recruiting 2011". ESPN.; "Scout.com Team Recruiting Rankings". Scout.; "2011 Team Ranking". Rivals.

== College career ==
Abrams was a member of Illinois basketball team from 2011 to 2017. Prior to the start of his senior season, Abrams tore his ACL, causing him to miss the entire 2014–15 season. Abrams was injured in a practice during the offseason, causing him to miss back-to-back seasons

=== College statistics ===
Legend
| GP | Games played | GS | Games started | MPG | Minutes per game |
| FG% | Field goal percentage | 3P% | 3-point field goal percentage | FT% | Free throw percentage |
| RPG | Rebounds per game | APG | Assists per game | SPG | Steals per game |
| BPG | Blocks per game | PPG | Points per game | **Bold** | Career high |

| Year | Team | GP | GS | MPG | FG% | 3P% | FT% | RPG | APG | SPG | BPG | PPG |
|---|---|---|---|---|---|---|---|---|---|---|---|---|
| 2011–12 | Illinois | 32 | 19 | 21.0 | 40.8 | 25.7 | 63.0 | 2.3 | 1.9 | 0.4 | 0.0 | 4.3 |
| 2012–13 | Illinois | 36 | 32 | 28.7 | 39.4 | 27.2 | 74.8 | 3.5 | 3.4 | 1.4 | 0.1 | 10.6 |
| 2013–14 | Illinois | 35 | 30 | 24.2 | 38.3 | 31.3 | 71.2 | 2.9 | 2.3 | 1.0 | 0.2 | 8.6 |
| 2014–15 | Illinois | Medical redshirt due to ACL injury | | | | | | | | | | |
| 2015–16 | Illinois | Medical redshirt due to Achilles injury | | | | | | | | | | |
| 2016–17 | Illinois | 35 | 35 | 30.1 | 33.3 | 27.0 | 77.2 | 3.5 | 3.2 | 1.2 | 0.2 | 10.7 |

Updated: March 27, 2017

== Professional career ==
Abrams signed on to play for APOP Paphos B.C. in the Cyprus Basketball Division A league for the 2017–18 season. After averaging 16.3 points, 5.8 assists and 5.7 rebounds per game with APOP Paphos B.C. during his rookie season, Abrams signed with KK Sloboda Užice of the Basketball League of Serbia for the 2018–19 season.

== Personal life ==
Abrams was born in Chicago to Tracy Abrams and Felicia Sales and has four brothers. He cites his favorite athlete as Derrick Rose, and his favorite basketball players from Illinois as Dee Brown and Deron Williams. Abrams earned a bachelor's degree in communication in May 2015 and a master's degree in recreation, sport and tourism in August 2016.

== See also ==
- List of foreign basketball players in Serbia
