= Joseph Bertrand (basketball) =

American professional basketball player

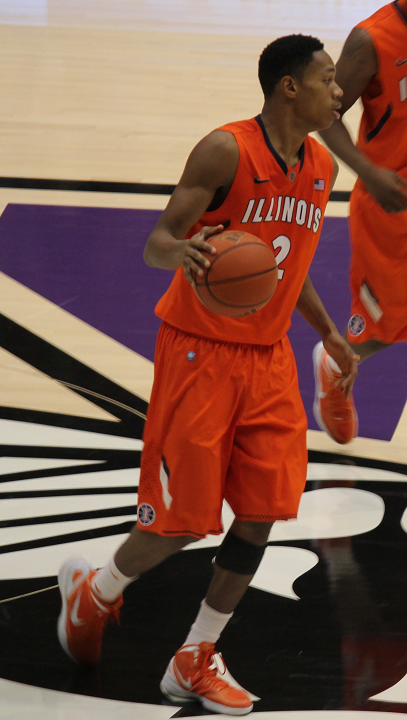

Free agent
- Position: Shooting guard

Personal information
- Born: March 23, 1991 (age 35)
- Listed height: 6 ft 6 in (1.98 m)
- Listed weight: 205 lb (93 kg)

Career information
- High school: Sterling (Sterling, Illinois)
- College: Illinois (2010–2014)
- NBA draft: 2014: undrafted
- Playing career: 2014–present

Career history
- 2014: Arantia Larochette
- 2015: Náuticos de Mazatlán
- 2015–2016: Halifax Hurricanes
- 2016: Island Storm
- 2016–2017: Dresden Titans

Joseph Bertrand (born March 23, 1991) is an American professional basketball player who last played for the Dresden Titans. He played college basketball for the University of Illinois.

== High school career ==
Bertrand played for Sterling High School, and was coached by Peter Goff. In high school, Bertrand was a two-time Illinois High School Association (IHSA) Slam Dunk Champion. Bertrand was named a member of the 2009 Illinois All-State Team as selected by the Illinois Basketball Coaches Association.

College recruiting
Name	Hometown	School	Height	Weight	Commit date
Joseph Bertrand; SG	Sterling, IL	Sterling High School	6 ft 5 in (1.96 m)	185 lb (84 kg)	Oct 12, 2008
Joseph Bertrand; SG	Recruit ratings: Scout: Rivals: (88)				
Overall recruit ranking: Scout: #15 (SG) Rivals: #31 (SG) ESPN: #47 (SG)
Note: In many cases, Scout, Rivals, 247Sports, On3, and ESPN may conflict in their listings of height and weight.; In these cases, the average was taken. ESPN grades are on a 100-point scale.; Sources: "Illinois Commit List for 2009". Rivals.; "Men's Basketball Recruiting". Scout.; "ESPN - Illinois Fighting Illini Basketball Recruiting 2009". ESPN.; "Scout.com Team Recruiting Rankings". Scout.; "2009 Team Ranking". Rivals.

== Collegiate career ==
Entering the University of Illinois during the 2009–10 season, Bertrand suffered a tear in his right Lateral meniscus during individual, preseason workouts. The injury, which required surgery, forced Bertrand to take a Medical redshirt as a true freshman. During his redshirt freshman season, Bertrand saw limited time off the bench as the 2010–11 Fighting Illini featured a starting line-up of four seniors and a regular rotation of a former Illinois Mr. Basketball winner and a former McDonald's All-American in Brandon Paul and Jereme Richmond, respectively. In total, Bertrand saw action in 15 games during the 2010–11 season.

=== College statistics ===
Year	Team	GP	GS	MPG	FG%	3P%	FT%	RPG	APG	SPG	BPG	PPG
2009–10	Illinois	Did not play due to Medical redshirt										
2010–11	Illinois	13	0	3.8	.538	.000	.750	0.5	0.3	0.08	0.15	1.3
2011–12	Illinois	32	14	20.2	.538	.300	.733	2.7	1.3	0.34	0.16	6.5
2012–13	Illinois	35	5	22.7	.502	.321	.773	4.1	0.6	0.91	0.17	7.3
2013–14	Illinois	35	23	25.1	.481	.385	.680	3.8	0.8	0.66	0.00	8.5

Legend
GP	Games played	GS	Games started	MPG	Minutes per game
FG%	Field goal percentage	3P%	3-point field goal percentage	FT%	Free throw percentage
RPG	Rebounds per game	APG	Assists per game	SPG	Steals per game
BPG	Blocks per game	PPG	Points per game	**Bold**	Career high

== Professional career ==
After going undrafted in the 2014 NBA draft, and talking to teams in both Austria and China, Bertrand joined Larochette in Luxembourg. On November 1, 2014 Bertrand was selected by the Westchester Knicks as their first pick in the 2014 NBA Development League Draft. Bertrand was then waived by the Westchester Knicks at the end of training camp on November 13, 2014. Bertrand later signed with Nauticos de Mazatlan of the CIBACOPA league in Mexico. On November 12, 2015, Bertrand signed with the Halifax Hurricanes of the National Basketball League of Canada (NBL). On March 6, 2016, he was waived by Halifax, however, he signed with the Island Storm nine days later.
