= Nnanna Egwu =

American basketball player

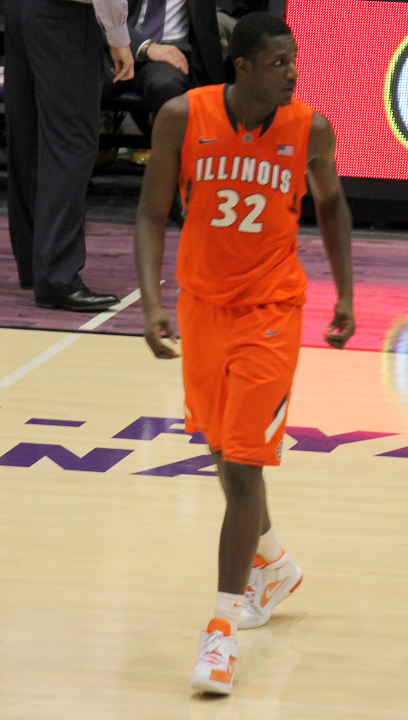
- Egwu with the Illinois Fighting Illini in 2012

Personal information
- Born: October 22, 1992 (age 34) Nigeria
- Listed height: 6 ft 11 in (2.11 m)
- Listed weight: 250 lb (113 kg)

Career information
- High school: St. Ignatius (Chicago, Illinois)
- College: Illinois (2011–2015)
- NBA draft: 2015: undrafted
- Playing career: 2015–2021
- Position: Center

Career history
- 2015–2016: Erie BayHawks
- 2016–2018: Cairns Taipans
- 2017: Super City Rangers
- 2018: Grand Rapids Drive
- 2018: Brisbane Bullets
- 2018–2019: Westports Malaysia Dragons
- 2019: Super City Rangers
- 2019–2021: Earthfriends Tokyo Z

Career highlights
- Big Ten All-Defensive Team (2015)
- Stats at Basketball Reference

Nnanna Egwu (born October 22, 1992) is an American former professional basketball player who last played for Earthfriends Tokyo Z of the Japanese B.League. He played college basketball for the Illinois Fighting Illini. Egwu holds the career record for blocks at Illinois, finishing with 201.

== Early life and high school ==
Egwu and his twin sister, Nnenna, were born in Nigeria on October 22, 1992. His mother brought his twin sister and him to Chicago, Illinois, from Nigeria when they were 5 years old to join their father, after they were finally granted visas in 1998—Egwu's father had moved to the United States in 1989. The family moved to Chicago three months before Egwu's sixth birthday.

Growing up in Chicago, Egwu found his niche on the basketball court. As an eighth grader, his mother signed him up for a park district team and by his freshman year of high school, he really had an outlet. As a junior at St. Ignatius College Prep in 2009–10, he averaged 13 points, six rebounds and four blocks per game as he earned fourth-team All-State by the IBCA and special mention All-State by the News-Gazette.

On November 10, 2010, Egwu signed a National Letter of Intent to play college basketball for the University of Illinois. Regarded as a four-star recruit by Rivals.com, he was ranked as the No. 97 athlete in the nation. He chose Illinois over scholarship offers from Northwestern, Oregon State, Purdue and Wisconsin.

As a senior in 2010–11, Egwu averaged 16 points, 10 rebounds and five blocks per game as he earned first-team All-State selection by the Associated Press, Champaign-Urbana News-Gazette and Illinois Basketball Coaches Association (IBCA). He was also named the Chicago Catholic League-North Division Co-Athlete of the Year.

College recruiting
Name	Hometown	School	Height	Weight	Commit date
Nnanna Egwu; C	Chicago, IL	St. Ignatius	6 ft 9 in (2.06 m)	190 lb (86 kg)	Oct 9, 2009
Nnanna Egwu; C	Recruit ratings: Scout: Rivals: (94)				
Overall recruit ranking: Scout: 9 (C) Rivals: 14 (C) ESPN: 10 (C)
Note: In many cases, Scout, Rivals, 247Sports, On3, and ESPN may conflict in their listings of height and weight.; In these cases, the average was taken. ESPN grades are on a 100-point scale.; Sources: "Illinois Commit List for 2011". Rivals.; "Men's Basketball Recruiting". Scout.; "ESPN – Illinois Fighting Illini Basketball Recruiting 2011". ESPN.; "Scout.com Team Recruiting Rankings". Scout.; "2011 Team Ranking". Rivals.

== College career ==
As a freshman at Illinois in 2011–12, Egwu played in all 32 games and started three times as he averaged 1.9 points and 1.5 rebounds per game. He scored a season-high 11 points on November 27, 2011, against Loyola Chicago.

As a sophomore in 2012–13, Egwu started 35 of 36 games while averaging 6.5 points and leading the team in rebounding with average of 4.9 per game. He was also fourth in the Big Ten Conference in blocked shots, averaging 1.4 per game, and was subsequently one of three recipients of team's Most Improved Player award. He scored a career-high 16 points on 7-of-10 shooting against Ohio State on January 5, 2013.

As a junior in 2013–14, Egwu started all 35 games, ranking fifth on the team in scoring with average of 6.9 points and led the Illini in rebounding on the season with average of 6.0 per game. He also led the Illini and ranked second in the Big Ten in blocked shots, averaging 2.1 per game as his 73 total blocks ranked second on UI all-time single-season list.

As a senior in 2014–15, Egwu earned Big Ten All-Defensive Team honors, and averaged 6.5 points and 5.9 rebounds in 33 games.

=== College statistics ===
Legend
GP	Games played	GS	Games started	MPG	Minutes per game
FG%	Field goal percentage	3P%	3-point field goal percentage	FT%	Free throw percentage
RPG	Rebounds per game	APG	Assists per game	SPG	Steals per game
BPG	Blocks per game	PPG	Points per game	**Bold**	Career high

Year	Team	GP	GS	MPG	FG%	3P%	FT%	RPG	APG	SPG	BPG	PPG
2011–12	Illinois	32	3	9.8	**.474**	.000	.462	1.5	.2	.2	.6	1.9
2012–13	Illinois	**36**	**35**	25.4	.460	.167	.636	4.9	.5	.6	1.4	6.5
2013–14	Illinois	35	**35**	29.7	.414	.217	.778	**6.0**	.4	.3	**2.1**	**6.9**
2014–15	Illinois	33	33	**29.8**	.431	**.303**	**.786**	5.9	**1.0**	**.8**	1.8	6.5

== Professional career ==
=== Orlando Magic and the D-League (2015–2016) ===
After going undrafted in the 2015 NBA draft, Egwu joined the Orlando Magic for the 2015 NBA Summer League. He signed with the Magic on September 24, 2015, but was waived on October 23, 2015, after appearing in five preseason games. On October 31, 2015, he was acquired by the Erie BayHawks of the NBA Development League as an affiliate player of the Magic. In 50 games for the BayHawks in 2015–16, Egwu averaged 9.2 points, 7.2 rebounds, 1.4 assists and 1.3 blocks per game.

In July 2016, Egwu re-joined the Orlando Magic for the Orlando Summer League, and then played for the NBA D-League Select Team at the Las Vegas Summer League.

=== Cairns Taipans and Super City Rangers (2016–2018) ===
On August 26, 2016, Egwu signed with the Cairns Taipans for the 2016–17 NBL season. He helped the Taipans finish the regular season in second place with a 15–13 record, but they went on to lose to the Perth Wildcats in the semi-finals. Egwu appeared in all 30 games for the Taipans in 2016–17, averaging 5.1 points and 3.7 rebounds per game.

On March 3, 2017, Egwu was named in the Super City Rangers squad for the Northern Blitz tournament. Two days later, he signed with the Rangers for the 2017 New Zealand NBL season. Egwu appeared in all 19 games for the Rangers in 2017, averaging 12.4 points, 7.6 rebounds, 1.2 assists and 1.5 blocks per game.

On April 28, 2017, Egwu re-signed with the Taipans for the 2017–18 NBL season.

=== Grand Rapids Drive (2018) ===
On March 13, 2018, Egwu was acquired by the Grand Rapids Drive of the NBA G League.

=== Brisbane Bullets and Westports Malaysia Dragons (2018–2019) ===
On September 25, 2018, Egwu signed with the Brisbane Bullets as an injury replacement for Matt Hodgson and Will Magnay. He left the team in last October to take up a pre-existing contract in Malaysia, subsequently joining the Westports Malaysia Dragons.

=== Super City Rangers (2019) ===
On April 1, 2019, Egwu signed with the Super City Rangers for the 2019 New Zealand NBL season, returning to the team for a second stint. He parted ways with the Rangers on June 29, 2019.

=== Earthfriends Tokyo Z (2019–2021) ===
On August 1, 2019, Egwu signed with Earthfriends Tokyo Z of the Japanese B.League.

== The Basketball Tournament ==
Egwu joined House of 'Paign, a team composed primarily of Illinois alumni in The Basketball Tournament 2020. He scored two points and pulled down seven rebounds in a 76–53 win over War Tampa in the first round.

== Personal ==
Egwu is the son of Emmanuel and Immaculata Egwu. One of four children, he has a twin sister, Nnenna, who attended Purdue University, and also has a younger sister and younger brother.
