= Ahmad Starks =

American basketball player (born 1992)

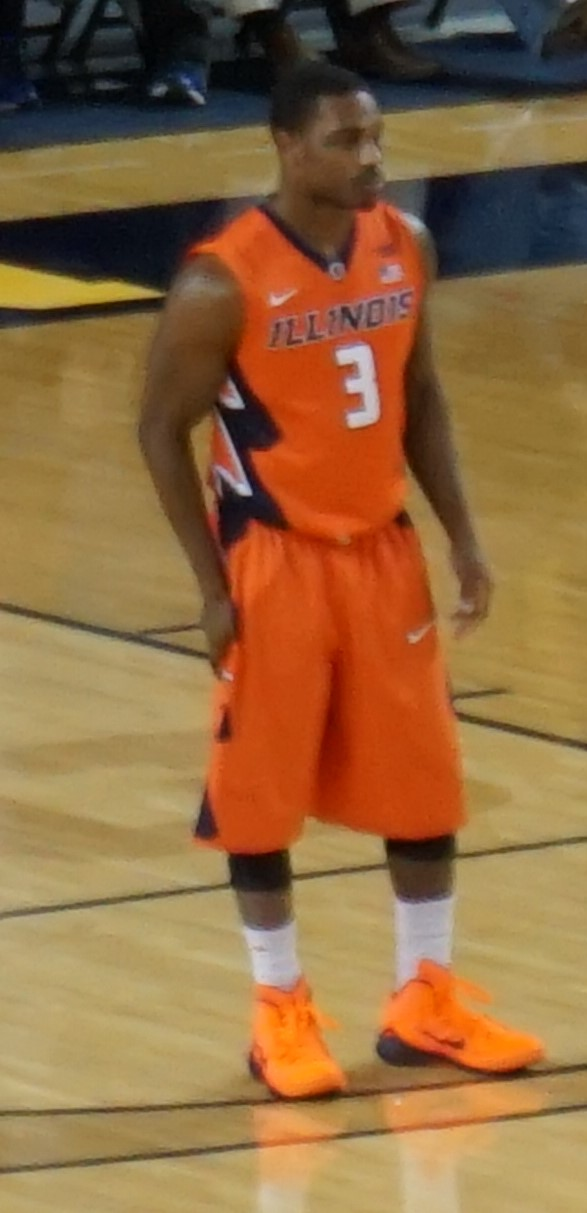
- Starks playing for Illinois in 2014

No. 3 – Pelister
- Position: Point guard
- League: Macedonian First League

Personal information
- Born: September 11, 1992 (age 34) Chicago, Illinois
- Listed height: 5 ft 9 in (1.75 m)
- Listed weight: 170 lb (77 kg)

Career information
- High school: Whitney Young (Chicago, Illinois)
- College: Oregon State (2011–2013); Illinois (2014–2015)
- NBA draft: 2015: undrafted
- Playing career: 2015–present

Career history
- 2015–2016: Eco Örebro
- 2017: North-West Tasmania Thunder
- 2017–2019: KW Titans
- 2019–present: Pelister

Ahmad Starks (born September 11, 1992) is an American professional basketball player for the Pelister of the Macedonian First League. Starks played college basketball for both Oregon State University and the University of Illinois.

== High school career ==
As a junior, Starks helped lead Whitney M. Young Magnet High School to a 4A Illinois High School Boys Basketball Championship with a 69–66 victory over Waukegan High School.

After his official visit to Oregon State, Starks verbally committed to the program and former head coach Craig Robinson in August 2008. During his recruitment, Starks considered offers from Northwestern, Valparaiso and Illinois-Chicago and received interest from Marquette, Purdue, Stanford, Virginia and Xavier. During his senior season, Starks averaged 16.1 points, 6.1 assists, 2.8 rebounds and 3.1 steals, leading Whitney Young to another Illinois Class 4A State Championship appearance, only to fall to Simeon Career Academy.

College recruiting
Name	Hometown	School	Height	Weight	Commit date
Ahmad Starks; PG	Chicago, IL	Whitney Young	5 ft 8 in (1.73 m)	145 lb (66 kg)	Aug 4, 2008
Ahmad Starks; PG	Recruit ratings: Scout: Rivals: (88)				
Overall recruit ranking: Scout: 145 Rivals: 134
Note: In many cases, Scout, Rivals, 247Sports, On3, and ESPN may conflict in their listings of height and weight.; In these cases, the average was taken. ESPN grades are on a 100-point scale.; Sources: "Oregon State Commit List for 2010". Rivals.; "Men's Basketball Recruiting". Scout.; "ESPN – Oregon State Beavers Basketball Recruiting 2010". ESPN.; "Scout.com Team Recruiting Rankings". Scout.; "2010 Team Ranking". Rivals.

== College career ==
After three seasons at Oregon State, Starks finished as the all-time career leader in three-pointers and single season three-pointers. Starks started in 73 career games at Oregon State and averaged 10.4 points, 2.0 rebounds, 2.3 assists and 1.0 steal as a junior. After his junior season, Starks announced his decision to transfer to aid his ailing grandmother. In May 2013, Starks committed to transfer to play at the University of Illinois. Starks was relegated to take a redshirt year during the 2013–14 season as his hardship waiver request was denied by the NCAA. As a redshirt senior, Starks started in 20 games for Illinois during the 2014–15 season and averaged 7.7 points a game.

== Professional career ==
Starks played with Eco Örebro of the Basketligan in Sweden during the 2015–2016 season and averaged 15.6 points per game. In April 2017, Starks signed with North-West Tasmania Thunder of the South East Australian Basketball League. In December 2017 Starks signed with the KW Titans of the National Basketball League of Canada.
