= Jamall Walker =

American basketball player and coach

Current position
- Title: Assistant coach
- Team: Ohio State
- Conference: Big Ten

Biographical details
- Born: August 7, 1977 (age 49); Wichita, Kansas, U.S.

Playing career
- 1996–1999: Saint Louis
- Position: Point guard

Coaching career (HC unless noted)
- 2000: Alton HS (assistant)
- 2001–2002: F. L. Schlagle HS (assistant)
- 2002–2004: Redlands CC (assistant)
- 2004–2006: Ball State (assistant)
- 2006–2007: Saint Louis (assistant)
- 2007–2008: Murray State (assistant)
- 2008–2009: Ohio (assistant)
- 2010–2012: Ohio (assistant)
- 2012–2019: Illinois (assistant)
- 2017: Illinois (Interim HC)
- 2019–2020: Illinois (Assistant to the HC)
- 2020–2024: Grand Canyon (assistant)
- 2024–present: Ohio State (assistant)

Administrative career (AD unless noted)
- 2009–2010: Arizona (DBO)

Head coaching record
- Overall: 2–1
- Tournaments: 2–1 (NIT)

Accomplishments and honors

Championships
- As Assistant Coach: WAC tournament winner (2021)

Awards
- As a player: Conference USA All-Freshman team (1996)

Jamall Walker (born August 7, 1977) is an American basketball coach who is an assistant coach at Ohio State University.

== Early life ==
A native of Wichita, Kansas, Walker graduated from Wichita South High School. As a high school senior in 1995, Walker was named Kansas Gatorade Player of the Year.

== College career ==
After graduating from high school Walker played for head coach Charlie Spoonhour at Saint Louis and started 73 games for the Billikens. Alongside future NBA lottery pick Larry Hughes, Walker helped the Billikens reach the second round of the 1998 NCAA Division I men's basketball tournament before losing to eventual national champions Kentucky Wildcats. Instead of attempting a professional basketball career overseas, Walker decided to go into coaching after his collegiate career.

== Coaching career ==
Walker's coaching career began as a varsity assistant at Alton High School in the Metro East area of Illinois during the 2000 season before serving in the same position at F. L. Schlagle High School in Kansas City, Kansas from 2001 to 2002. From 2003 to 2004 Walker spent two seasons as an assistant coach at Redlands Community College in El Reno, Oklahoma. During his two seasons, Redlands went 67–5 and was the 2004 National Junior College Athletic Association (NJCAA) Division I national runner-up. Walker later moved to work as an assistant coach at Ball State under Tim Buckley for two seasons. Over the next four seasons from 2007 to 2010 Walker spent a single season with the following programs: Saint Louis under Brad Soderberg, Murray State under Billy Kennedy, Ohio under John Groce, and with Arizona as the director of basketball operations under Sean Miller. After a season with Arizona, Walker returned to Ohio for two more seasons with John Groce.

In 2012, Walker became an assistant at Illinois following Groce, who was hired as Illinois' head coach. Walker was named interim head coach after Groce was fired March 11, 2017, and Walker lead the Illini to a 2–1 record in the 2017 National Invitation Tournament. After Illinois hired head coach Brad Underwood, Walker was retained as an assistant coach. Walker was demoted to Assistant to the Head Coach for the 2019–20 season, his final season with the Illini.

Walker left the Illini following the season to join the coaching staff at Grand Canyon.

Walker was named an assistant coach at Ohio State University on April 10, 2024.

== Head coaching record ==
Record table
Season	Team	Overall	Conference	Standing	Postseason
Illinois Fighting Illini (Big Ten Conference) (2017)
2016–17	Illinois	2–1†			NIT Quarterfinals
Illinois:		2–1 (.667)			
Total:		2–1 (.667)			
National champion Postseason invitational champion Conference regular season champion Conference regular season and conference tournament champion Division regular season champion Division regular season and conference tournament champion Conference tournament champion

†Walker was interim head coach for Illinois during 2017 NIT
