= Maverick Morgan =

American basketball player

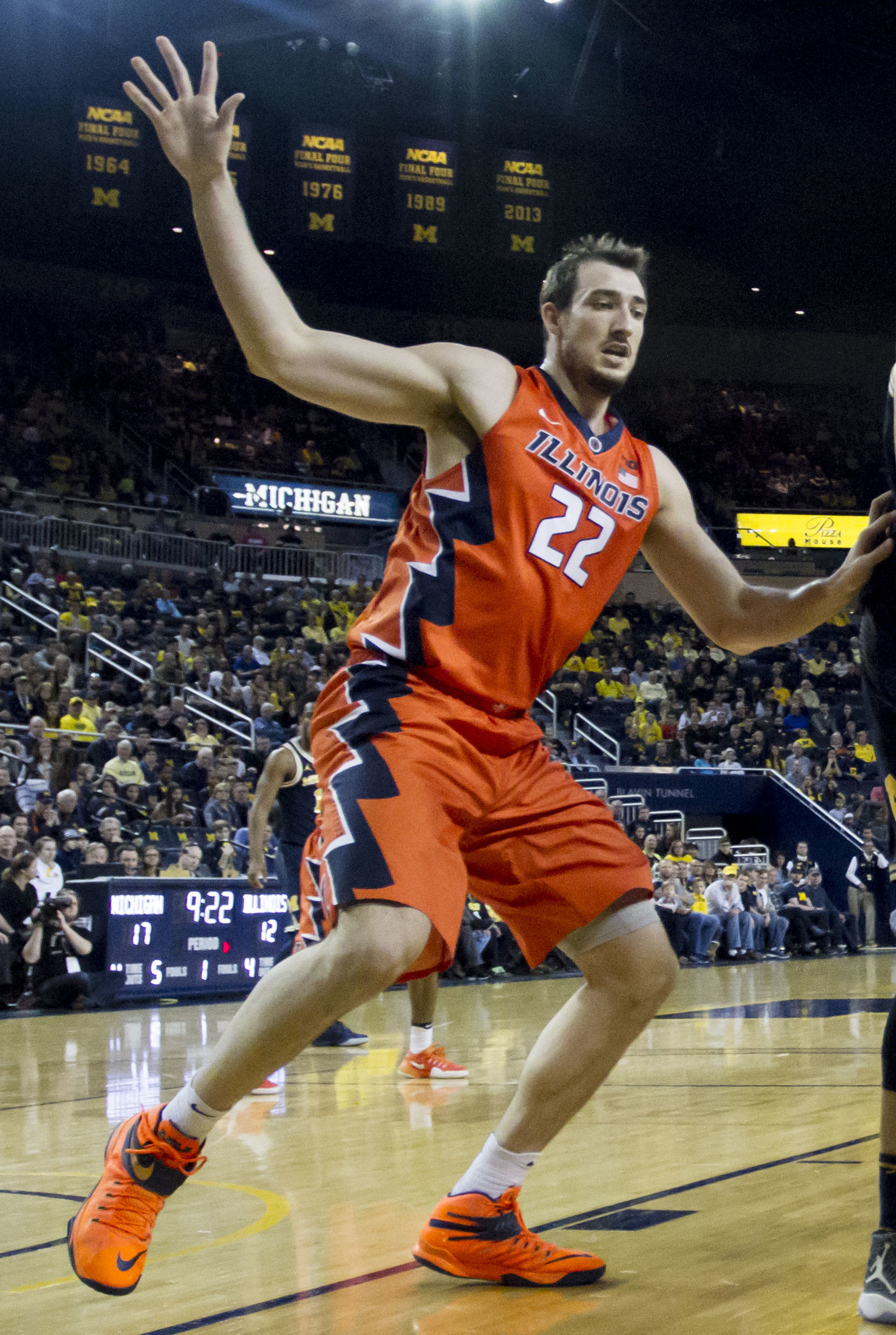

Personal information
- Born: August 24, 1994 (age 32) Springboro, Ohio, U.S.
- Listed height: 6 ft 10 in (2.08 m)
- Listed weight: 245 lb (111 kg)

Career information
- High school: Springboro (Springboro, Ohio)
- College: Illinois (2013–2017)
- NBA draft: 2017: undrafted
- Playing career: 2017–2018
- Position: Center
- Number: 22

Career history
- 2017–2018: GTK Gliwice
- 2018: BC Prienai
- 2018: St. John's Edge

Maverick Morgan (born August 24, 1994) is an American former professional basketball player. He played college basketball for the Illinois Fighting Illini.

== Professional career ==
In July 2017, Morgan signed with GTK Gliwice of the Polish Basketball League for the 2017–18 season. After averaging 12.8 points and 5.8 rebounds per game with GTK Gliwice, Morgan signed with BC Prienai of the Lithuanian Basketball League for the 2018–19 season. After a brief stint with Prienai, he joined the St. John's Edge of the National Basketball League of Canada. He was released following one game with the team.
