= 2012–13 Purdue Boilermakers men's basketball team =

American college basketball season

2012–13 Purdue Boilermakers men's basketball

CBI, Quarterfinals
- Conference: Big Ten Conference
- Record: 16–18 (8–10 Big Ten)
- Head coach: Matt Painter (8th season)
- Assistant coaches: Jack Owens; Micah Shrewsberry; Greg Gary
- Home arena: Mackey Arena

2012–13 Big Ten Conference men's basketball standings
	Conf.				Overall
Team	W		L	PCT	W		L	PCT
No. 4 Indiana	14	–	4	.778	29	–	7	.806
No. 7 Ohio State †	13	–	5	.722	29	–	8	.784
No. 9 Michigan State	13	–	5	.722	27	–	9	.750
No. 10 Michigan	12	–	6	.667	31	–	8	.795
No. 18 Wisconsin	12	–	6	.667	23	–	12	.657
Iowa	9	–	9	.500	25	–	13	.658
Illinois	8	–	10	.444	23	–	13	.639
Minnesota	8	–	10	.444	21	–	13	.618
Purdue	8	–	10	.444	16	–	18	.471
Nebraska	5	–	13	.278	15	–	18	.455
Northwestern	4	–	14	.222	13	–	19	.406
Penn State	2	–	16	.111	10	–	21	.323
† 2013 Big Ten tournament winner Rankings from AP Poll

The 2012–13 Purdue Boilermakers men's basketball team represented Purdue University in the 2012–13 NCAA Division I men's basketball season . The head coach was Matt Painter, in his eighth season with the Boilers. The team played its home games in Mackey Arena in West Lafayette, Indiana and was a member of the Big Ten Conference. The team featured well known basketball analyst Raphael Davis. They finished the season 16–18, 8–10 in Big Ten play to finish in a three-way tie for seventh place. After a first round loss in the Big Ten tournament, the school received a bid to in the College Basketball Invitational where they lost to Santa Clara in the quarterfinals. The season marked the first time in six years that Purdue had not won at least one NCAA tournament game.

== Previous season ==
The Boilermakers finished the 2011–12 season 22–13, 20–8 in Big Ten play to finish in sixth place. They lost in the quarterfinals of the Big Ten tournament. They received an at-large bid to the NCAA tournament as a No. 10 seed. There they defeated Saint Mary's in the second round (formerly and now known as the first round) before losing to No. 6 Kansas.

== Season Notes ==
- Purdue was one of four regional hosts for the 2K Sports Classic Tournament in November 2012. The championship doubleheaders for the tournament were hosted at Madison Square Garden in New York City on November 15–16.
- Purdue was slated to participate in a summer tour of Italy in August 2012. Due to NCAA rule changes, it was the first year incoming freshmen were allowed to participate in such tours. Additionally, the Boilermakers will be allowed 10 practices in advance of the trip.
- Purdue finished 7th in B1G play with an 8–10 record.
- Purdue lost its first home opener during the Matt Painter era to Bucknell.
- Freshman guard Rapheal Davis scored 21 points in 10 minutes against #22 ranked Notre Dame at Conseco Fieldhouse.
- Freshman center A. J. Hammons scored 30 points in Purdue's 97–60 loss to Indiana, their worst home loss in the storied rivalry.
- Junior guard Terone Johnson scored 32 points against #7 ranked Michigan, the most points scored by any player in B1G play on the season.
- Senior DJ Byrd led the B1G in three point field goals made, averaging 2.6 made per game.
- DJ Byrd surpassed Chad Austin and E'Twaun Moore with the tenth-most three point field goals in a single season.
- A. J. Hammons led the B1G in blocks per game, averaging 2 per contest.
- Freshmen made up for nearly half (46%) of Purdue's scoring on the season.
- Terone Johnson led Purdue with 13.3 points per game on the season.
- A. J. Hammons led Purdue and all B1G freshmen with 6.1 rebounds per game on the season.
- Ronnie Johnson led Purdue with 4 assists per game on the season.
- A. J. Hammons was the only player in the power six conferences averaging at least 10 points, 6 rebounds, and 2 blocks per contest on the season.
- On the season, Purdue was second in rebounding in the B1G, averaging 39.3 per contest, boasting a +5.3 margin.
- Freshman point guard Ronnie Johnson averaged 4.6 assists per game in B1G action, trailing only Michigan's All-American, Trey Burke.
- 3 of Purdue's 6 losses in preseason play came against eventual NCAA Tournament teams (Bucknell, Villanova, Notre Dame).
- Purdue defeated two top-twenty teams on the season after beating #11 Illinois at home and #17 Wisconsin on the road in conference play. Purdue defeated just one ranked opponent the prior season.
- Senior DJ Byrd was a B1G Honorable Mention for the second year in a row.
- Junior Terone Johnson was a Third Team All-B1G selection with the coaches' pick, as well as a B1G Honorable Mention by the media.
- Freshman A. J. Hammons was a Freshman All-B1G selection, Purdue's first since Kelsey Barlow in 2010.
- In the regular season finale, head coach Matt Painter received his 200th career win as a head coach after defeating Minnesota.
- Throughout the season, Painter regularly started at least three freshman at a time with three eventually being consistent starters (center AJ Hammons, point guard Ronnie Johnson, and shooting guard Rapheal Davis).
- Ronnie Johnson scored a career high 27 points against Santa Clara in the last game of the season during the CBI tournament

== Roster ==
2012–13 Purdue Boilermakers men's basketball team
Players
Coaches

Pos.	#	Name	Height	Weight	Year	Hometown
G	0	Terone Johnson	6 ft 2 in (1.88 m)	207 lb (94 kg)	Jr	Indianapolis, IN
G	1	Anthony Johnson	6 ft 3 in (1.91 m)	179 lb (81 kg)	RS So	Chicago, IL
G	3	Ronnie Johnson	5 ft 9 in (1.75 m)	160 lb (73 kg)	Fr	Indianapolis, IN
G	11	Stephen Toyra	6 ft 3 in (1.91 m)	165 lb (75 kg)	Fr	Lafayette, IN
G	14	Dru Anthrop	6 ft 0 in (1.83 m)	181 lb (82 kg)	Sr	Lafayette, IN
F	15	Donnie Hale	6 ft 8 in (2.03 m)	212 lb (96 kg)	RS Fr	New Albany, IN
C	20	A. J. Hammons	7 ft 0 in (2.13 m)	275 lb (125 kg)	Fr	Carmel, IN
G/F	21	D. J. Byrd	6 ft 5 in (1.96 m)	234 lb (106 kg)	Sr	Crawfordsville, IN
F	23	Jay Simpson	6 ft 9 in (2.06 m)	235 lb (107 kg)	Fr	Champaign, IL
F	30	Neal Beshears	6 ft 6 in (1.98 m)	187 lb (85 kg)	So	Winchester, IN
F	34	Jacob Lawson	6 ft 8 in (2.03 m)	218 lb (99 kg)	So	Reidsville, NC
G	35	Raphael Davis	6 ft 5 in (1.96 m)	200 lb (91 kg)	Fr	Fort Wayne, IN
C	50	Travis Carroll	6 ft 9 in (2.06 m)	231 lb (105 kg)	Jr	Danville, IN
F	55	Sandi Marcius	6 ft 9 in (2.06 m)	257 lb (117 kg)	RS Jr	Nedelisce, Croatia

Head coach

Matt Painter (Purdue)

Assistant coach(es)

Jack Owens (Eastern Illinois)
Micah Shrewsberry (Hanover)
Greg Gary (Tulane)

Legend

- (C) Team captain
- (S) Suspended
- (I) Ineligible
- (W) Walk-on
- Injured
- Current redshirt

Roster
Last update: February 23, 2012

=== Incoming recruits ===
College recruiting information
Name	Hometown	School	Height	Weight	Commit date
Raphael Davis; SG	Fort Wayne, IN	La Lumiere School	6 ft 5 in (1.96 m)	200 lb (91 kg)	May 14, 2009
Raphael Davis; SG	Recruit ratings: Scout: Rivals: (92)				
A. J. Hammons; C	Carmel, IN	Oak Hill Academy	7 ft 0 in (2.13 m)	275 lb (125 kg)	Oct 13, 2011
A. J. Hammons; C	Recruit ratings: Scout: Rivals: (92)				
Ronnie Johnson; PG	Indianapolis, IN	North Central High School	5 ft 10 in (1.78 m)	160 lb (73 kg)	May 2, 2011
Ronnie Johnson; PG	Recruit ratings: Scout: Rivals: (92)				
Jay Simpson; PF	Champaign, IL	La Lumiere School	6 ft 9 in (2.06 m)	235 lb (107 kg)	Nov 1, 2009
Jay Simpson; PF	Recruit ratings: Scout: Rivals: (89)				
Overall recruit ranking: Scout: 18 ESPN: 16
Note: In many cases, Scout, Rivals, 247Sports, On3, and ESPN may conflict in their listings of height and weight.; In these cases, the average was taken. ESPN grades are on a 100-point scale.; Sources: "2012 Purdue Signees". Rivals.; "2012 Purdue Signees". Scout.; "2012 Purdue Signees". ESPN.; "Scout.com Team Recruiting Rankings". Scout.; "2012 Team Ranking". Rivals.

== Schedule ==
Date time, TV	Rank^{#}	Opponent^{#}	Result	Record	Site (attendance) city, state
Exhibition
10/30/2012*; 7:00 pm		Montevallo	W 70–61	–	Mackey Arena (12,571); West Lafayette, IN
11/03/2012*; 8:00 pm		Newberry	W 109–68	–	Mackey Arena (13,347); West Lafayette, IN
Non-conference regular season
11/09/2012*; 7:00 pm		Bucknell; 2K Sports Classic	L 65–70	0–1	Mackey Arena (13,090); West Lafayette, IN
11/11/2012*; 2:00 pm		Hofstra; 2K Sports Classic	W 83–54	1–1	Mackey Arena (13,427); West Lafayette, IN
11/15/2012*; 9:30 pm, ESPN2		vs. Villanova; 2K Sports Classic semifinals	L 81–89 ^{OT}	1–2	Madison Square Garden (6,149); New York City, NY
11/16/2012*; 5:00 pm, ESPNU		vs. Oregon State; 2K Sports Classic 3rd place game	L 58–66	1–3	Madison Square Garden (6,177); New York City, NY
11/21/2012*; 8:00 pm, BTN		UNC Wilmington	W 66–40	2–3	Mackey Arena (9,386); West Lafayette, IN
11/28/2012*; 7:15 pm, ESPNU		at Clemson; ACC–Big Ten Challenge	W 73–61	3–3	Littlejohn Coliseum (7,632); Clemson, SC
12/01/2012*; 2:15 pm, BTN		Xavier	L 57–63	3–4	Mackey Arena (12,290); West Lafayette, IN
12/04/2012*; 6:30 pm, BTN		Lamar	W 72–39	4–4	Mackey Arena (12,721); West Lafayette, IN
12/08/2012*; 2:00 pm, ESPN3		at Eastern Michigan	L 44–47	4–5	Convocation Center (1,790); Ypsilanti, MI
12/15/2012*; 5:05 pm, ESPN2		vs. No. 22 Notre Dame; Crossroads Classic	L 68–81	4–6	Bankers Life Fieldhouse (19,192); Indianapolis, IN
12/18/2012*; 7:00 pm, ESPN3		Ball State	W 66–56	5–6	Mackey Arena (8,008); West Lafayette, IN
12/29/2012*; 2:00 pm, ESPN3		William & Mary	W 73–66	6–6	Mackey Arena (10,185); West Lafayette, IN
Big Ten regular season
01/02/2013; 8:30 pm, BTN		No. 11 Illinois	W 68–61	7–6 (1–0)	Mackey Arena (9,874); West Lafayette, IN
01/05/2013; 12:00 pm, BTN		at No. 18 Michigan State	L 61–84	7–7 (1–1)	Breslin Center (14,797); East Lansing, MI
01/08/2013; 9:00 pm, ESPN		No. 15 Ohio State	L 64–74	7–8 (1–2)	Mackey Arena (14,642); West Lafayette, IN
01/13/2013; 12:00 pm, BTN		Penn State	W 60–42	8–8 (2–2)	Mackey Arena (13,222); West Lafayette, IN
01/16/2013; 9:00 pm, BTN		at Nebraska	W 65–56	9–8 (3–2)	Bob Devaney Sports Center (9,271); Lincoln, NE
01/19/2013*; 2:00 pm, CBS		West Virginia	W 79–52	10–8 (3–2)	Mackey Arena (14,677); West Lafayette, IN
01/24/2013; 7:00 pm, ESPN		at No. 2 Michigan	L 53–68	10–9 (3–3)	Crisler Center (12,693); Ann Arbor, MI
01/27/2013; 3:30 pm, BTN		Iowa	W 65–62 ^{OT}	11–9 (4–3)	Mackey Arena (13,671); West Lafayette, IN
01/30/2013; 8:30 pm, BTN		No. 3 Indiana; Indiana–Purdue rivalry	L 60–97	11–10 (4–4)	Mackey Arena (14,845); West Lafayette, IN
02/02/2013; 12:00 pm, ESPN2		at Northwestern	L 60–75	11–11 (4–5)	Welsh-Ryan Arena (8,117); Evanston, IL
02/05/2013; 7:00 pm, BTN		at Penn State	W 58–49	12–11 (5–5)	Bryce Jordan Center (6,270); University Park, PA
02/09/2013; 7:00 pm, BTN		No. 12 Michigan State	L 65–78	12–12 (5–6)	Mackey Arena (14,845); West Lafayette, IN
02/13/2013; 9:00 pm, BTN		at Illinois	L 59–79	12–13 (5–7)	Assembly Hall (13,464); Champaign, IL
02/16/2013; 2:00 pm, ESPN		at No. 1 Indiana; Indiana-Purdue rivalry	L 55–83	12–14 (5–8)	Assembly Hall (17,472); Bloomington, IN
02/24/2013; 6:00 pm, BTN		Northwestern	W 74–43	13–14 (6–8)	Mackey Arena (13,445); West Lafayette, IN
02/27/2013; 8:36 pm, BTN		at Iowa	L 48–58	13–15 (6–9)	Carver-Hawkeye Arena (11,787); Iowa City, IA
03/03/2013; 1:00 pm, ESPN		at No. 17 Wisconsin	W 69–56	14–15 (7–9)	Kohl Center (17,230); Madison, WI
03/06/2013; 7:00 pm, BTN		No. 7 Michigan	L 75–80	14–16 (7–10)	Mackey Arena (14,201); West Lafayette, IN
03/09/2013; 12:00 pm, BTN		Minnesota	W 89–73	15–16 (8–10)	Mackey Arena (14,082); West Lafayette, IN
Big Ten tournament
03/14/2013; 6:30 pm, ESPN2	(7)	vs. (10) Nebraska; First round	L 55–57	15–17	United Center (19,667); Chicago, IL
CBI
03/20/2013*; 7:00 pm, AXS TV		Western Illinois; First round	W 81–67	16–17	Mackey Arena (3,046); West Lafayette, IN
03/25/2013*; 7:00 pm		Santa Clara; Quarterfinals	L 83–86	16–18	Mackey Arena (3,629); West Lafayette, IN
*Non-conference game. ^{#}Rankings from Coaches Poll. (#) Tournament seedings in parentheses. All times are in Eastern Time.

== 2013 Signing Class ==
College recruiting information
Name	Hometown	School	Height	Weight	Commit date
Bryson Scott; PG	Fort Wayne, IN	Northrop High School	6 ft 1 in (1.85 m)	170 lb (77 kg)	11-28-2010
Bryson Scott; PG	Recruit ratings: Scout: Rivals: (86)				
Basil Smotherman; SF	Indianapolis, IN	Lawrence North High School	6 ft 6 in (1.98 m)	190 lb (86 kg)	2-16-2011
Basil Smotherman; SF	Recruit ratings: Scout: Rivals: (75)				
Kendall Stephens; SG	St. Charles, IL	St. Charles East High School	6 ft 5 in (1.96 m)	180 lb (82 kg)	2-14-2011
Kendall Stephens; SG	Recruit ratings: Scout: Rivals: (86)				
Overall recruit ranking: Rivals: 27
Note: In many cases, Scout, Rivals, 247Sports, On3, and ESPN may conflict in their listings of height and weight.; In these cases, the average was taken. ESPN grades are on a 100-point scale.; Sources: "2013 Purdue Signees". Rivals.; "2013 Purdue Signees". Scout.; "2013 Purdue Signees". ESPN.; "Scout.com Team Recruiting Rankings". Scout.; "2013 Team Ranking". Rivals.
