= 2012–13 Indiana Hoosiers men's basketball team =

American college basketball season

2012–13 Indiana Hoosiers men's basketball

Big Ten regular season champions Legends Classic champions

NCAA tournament, Sweet Sixteen
- Conference: Big Ten Conference

Ranking
- Coaches: No. 7
- AP: No. 4
- Record: 29–7 (14–4 Big Ten)
- Head coach: Tom Crean (5th season)
- Assistant coaches: Tim Buckley (5th season); Steve McClain (3rd season); Kenny Johnson (1st season)
- Captain: Jordan Hulls
- Home arena: Assembly Hall

2012–13 Big Ten Conference men's basketball standings
	Conf.				Overall
Team	W		L	PCT	W		L	PCT
No. 4 Indiana	14	–	4	.778	29	–	7	.806
No. 7 Ohio State †	13	–	5	.722	29	–	8	.784
No. 9 Michigan State	13	–	5	.722	27	–	9	.750
No. 10 Michigan	12	–	6	.667	31	–	8	.795
No. 18 Wisconsin	12	–	6	.667	23	–	12	.657
Iowa	9	–	9	.500	25	–	13	.658
Illinois	8	–	10	.444	23	–	13	.639
Minnesota	8	–	10	.444	21	–	13	.618
Purdue	8	–	10	.444	16	–	18	.471
Nebraska	5	–	13	.278	15	–	18	.455
Northwestern	4	–	14	.222	13	–	19	.406
Penn State	2	–	16	.111	10	–	21	.323
† 2013 Big Ten tournament winner Rankings from AP Poll

The 2012–13 Indiana Hoosiers men's basketball team represented Indiana University in the 2012–13 college basketball season. The team was a member of the Big Ten Conference and spent ten weeks ranked as the #1 team in the country.

== Roster ==
2012–13 Indiana Hoosiers men's basketball team
Players
Coaches

Pos.	#	Name	Height	Weight	Year	Hometown
F	0	Will Sheehey	6 ft 7 in (2.01 m)	200 lb (91 kg)	Jr	Stuart, Florida
G	1	Jordan Hulls (C)	6 ft 0 in (1.83 m)	182 lb (83 kg)	Sr	Bloomington, Indiana
F	2	Christian Watford	6 ft 9 in (2.06 m)	232 lb (105 kg)	Sr	Birmingham, Alabama
G	3	Maurice Creek	6 ft 5 in (1.96 m)	194 lb (88 kg)	RS Jr	Oxon Hill, Maryland
G	4	Victor Oladipo	6 ft 5 in (1.96 m)	214 lb (97 kg)	Jr	Upper Marlboro, Maryland
G	10	Jonny Marlin	5 ft 10 in (1.78 m)	175 lb (79 kg)	So	Greenwood, Indiana
G	11	Yogi Ferrell	6 ft 0 in (1.83 m)	178 lb (81 kg)	Fr	Indianapolis, Indiana
F	12	Hanner Mosquera-Perea	6 ft 8 in (2.03 m)	225 lb (102 kg)	Fr	Istmina, Colombia
F	13	Austin Etherington	6 ft 6 in (1.98 m)	206 lb (93 kg)	So	Cicero, Indiana
G	15	Raphael Smith	6 ft 3 in (1.91 m)	172 lb (78 kg)	RS So	South Bend, Indiana
G	20	Taylor Wayer	5 ft 11 in (1.8 m)	172 lb (78 kg)	Jr	Indianapolis, Indiana
G	23	Remy Abell	6 ft 4 in (1.93 m)	201 lb (91 kg)	So	Louisville, Kentucky
F	24	Jeff Howard	6 ft 8 in (2.03 m)	224 lb (102 kg)	Jr	Westfield, Indiana
F	32	Derek Elston	6 ft 9 in (2.06 m)	216 lb (98 kg)	Sr	Tipton, Indiana
F	33	Jeremy Hollowell	6 ft 8 in (2.03 m)	217 lb (98 kg)	Fr	Indianapolis, Indiana
F	40	Cody Zeller	7 ft 0 in (2.13 m)	240 lb (109 kg)	So	Washington, Indiana
C	42	Peter Jurkin	7 ft 0 in (2.13 m)	230 lb (104 kg)	Fr	Juba, South Sudan

Head coach

- Tom Crean

Assistant coach(es)

- Tim Buckley
- Steve McClain
- Kenny Johnson

Legend

- (C) Team captain
- (S) Suspended
- (I) Ineligible
- (W) Walk-on
- Injured
- Current redshirt

Roster
Last update: April 3, 2012

== Schedule ==
Date time, TV	Rank^{#}	Opponent^{#}	Result	Record	High points	High rebounds	High assists	Site (attendance) city, state
Exhibition
November 1*; 8:30 pm	No. 1	Indiana Wesleyan	W 86–57	–	12 – Creek	7 – Oladipo	4 – Ferrell	Assembly Hall (17,186); Bloomington, IN
Non-conference regular season
November 9*; 8:00 pm, BTN	No. 1	Bryant	W 97–54	1–0	18 – Zeller	15 – Watford	7 – Ferrell	Assembly Hall (17,472); Bloomington, IN
November 12*; 7:00 pm	No. 1	North Dakota State; Legends Classic	W 87–61	2–0	22 – Zeller	9 – Zeller	5 – Oladipo	Assembly Hall (17,145); Bloomington, IN
November 15*; 7:00 pm, BTN	No. 1	Sam Houston State; Legends Classic	W 99–45	3–0	23 – Watford	7 – Tied	7 – Ferrell	Assembly Hall (17,472); Bloomington, IN
November 19*; 5:30 pm, ESPNU	No. 1	vs. Georgia; Legends Classic Semifinals	W 66–53	4–0	15 – Oladipo	8 – Oladipo	5 – Ferrell	Barclays Center (N/A); Brooklyn, NY
November 20*; 10:00 pm, ESPN	No. 1	vs. Georgetown; Legends Classic Championship	W 82–72 ^{OT}	5–0	17 – Tied	10 – Watford	4 – Ferrell	Barclays Center (10,478); Brooklyn, NY
November 25*; 6:00 pm, BTN	No. 1	Ball State	W 101–53	6–0	19 – Sheehey	10 – Watford	3 – 3 tied	Assembly Hall (17,126); Bloomington, IN
November 27*; 9:30 pm, ESPN	No. 1	No. 14 North Carolina; ACC–Big Ten Challenge	W 83–59	7–0	20 – Zeller	8 – Zeller	8 – Hulls	Assembly Hall (17,472); Bloomington, IN
December 1*; 7:30 pm, BTN	No. 1	Coppin State	W 87–51	8–0	14 – Tied	7 – Tied	6 – Oladipo	Assembly Hall (17,472); Bloomington, IN
December 8*; 6:00 pm, BTN	No. 1	Central Connecticut	W 100–69	9–0	21 – Watford	19 – Zeller	6 – Ferrell	Assembly Hall (17,472); Bloomington, IN
December 15*; 2:00 pm, CBS	No. 1	vs. Butler; Close the Gap Crossroads Classic	L 86–88 ^{OT}	9–1	18 – Tied	8 – Ferrell	5 – Hulls	Bankers Life Fieldhouse (19,192); Indianapolis, IN
December 19*; 7:00 pm, BTN	No. 6	Mount St. Mary's	W 93–54	10–1	16 – Tied	8 – Watford	9 – Ferrell	Assembly Hall (17,009); Bloomington, IN
December 21*; 7:00 pm, ESPN2	No. 6	Florida Atlantic	W 88–52	11–1	24 – Zeller	10 – Mosquera-Perea	5 – Ferrell	Assembly Hall (17,472); Bloomington, IN
December 28*; 8:00 pm, BTN	No. 5	Jacksonville	W 93–59	12–1	20 – Hulls	7 – Oladipo	10 – Ferrell	Assembly Hall (17,472); Bloomington, IN
Big Ten regular season
December 31; 4:00 pm, ESPN2	No. 5	at Iowa	W 69–65	13–1 (1–0)	19 – Zeller	10 – Tied	6 – Hulls	Carver-Hawkeye Arena (15,400); Iowa City, IA
January 7; 7:00 pm, BTN	No. 5	at Penn State	W 74–51	14–1 (2–0)	16 – Watford	8 – Watford	3 – Oladipo	Bryce Jordan Center (9,386); University Park, PA
January 12; 12:00 pm, BTN	No. 5	No. 8 Minnesota	W 88–81	15–1 (3–0)	20 – Oladipo	9 – Watford	8 – Ferrell	Assembly Hall (17,472); Bloomington, IN
January 15; 9:00 pm, ESPN	No. 2	Wisconsin	L 59–64	15–2 (3–1)	23 – Zeller	10 – Zeller	3 – Hulls	Assembly Hall (17,472); Bloomington, IN
January 20; 1:00 pm, BTN	No. 2	at Northwestern	W 67–59	16–2 (4–1)	21 – Zeller	13 – Zeller	5 – Oladipo	Welsh-Ryan Arena (8,117); Evanston, IL
January 23; 7:00 pm, BTN	No. 7	Penn State	W 72–49	17–2 (5–1)	19 – Oladipo	9 – Watford	5 – Oladipo	Assembly Hall (17,472); Bloomington, IN
January 27; 1:00 pm, CBS	No. 7	No. 13 Michigan State	W 75–70	18–2 (6–1)	21 – Oladipo	7 – Tied	4 – Hulls	Assembly Hall (17,472); Bloomington, IN
January 30; 8:30 pm, BTN	No. 3	at Purdue; Rivalry/Crimson and Gold Cup	W 97–60	19–2 (7–1)	19 – Zeller	11 – Zeller	7 – Sheehey	Mackey Arena (14,845); West Lafayette, IN
February 2; 9:00 pm, ESPN	No. 3	No. 1 Michigan; College GameDay	W 81–73	20–2 (8–1)	19 – Zeller	10 – Tied	5 – Ferrell	Assembly Hall (17,472); Bloomington, IN
February 7; 7:00 pm, ESPN	No. 1	at Illinois; Rivalry	L 72–74	20–3 (8–2)	14 – Zeller	9 – Zeller	5 – Oladipo	Assembly Hall (16,618); Champaign, IL
February 10; 1:00 pm, CBS	No. 1	at No. 10 Ohio State	W 81–68	21–3 (9–2)	26 – Oladipo	8 – Tied	4 – Hulls	Value City Arena (18,809); Columbus, OH
February 13; 7:00 pm, BTN	No. 1	Nebraska	W 76–47	22–3 (10–2)	16 – Zeller	11 – Watford	3 – Hulls	Assembly Hall (17,472); Bloomington, IN
February 16; 2:00 pm, ESPN	No. 1	Purdue; Rivalry/Crimson and Gold Cup	W 83–55	23–3 (11–2)	22 – Sheehey	9 – Zeller	5 – Tied	Assembly Hall (17,472); Bloomington, IN
February 19; 7:00 pm, ESPN	No. 1	at No. 4 Michigan State	W 72–68	24–3 (12–2)	19 – Oladipo	9 – Oladipo	5 – Ferrell	Breslin Center (14,797); East Lansing, MI
February 26; 7:00 pm, ESPN	No. 1	at Minnesota	L 73–77	24–4 (12–3)	17 – Hulls	7 – Zeller	5 – Ferrell	Williams Arena (14,625); Minneapolis, MN
March 2; 7:30 pm, BTN	No. 1	Iowa	W 73–60	25–4 (13–3)	22 – Zeller	10 – Zeller	5 – Ferrell	Assembly Hall (17,472); Bloomington, IN
March 5; 9:00 pm, ESPN	No. 2	No. 14 Ohio State	L 58–67	25–5 (13–4)	17 – Zeller	6 – Oladipo	3 – Zeller	Assembly Hall (17,472); Bloomington, IN
March 10; 4:00 pm, CBS	No. 2	at No. 7 Michigan	W 72–71	26–5 (14–4)	25 – Zeller	13 – Oladipo	3 – Tied	Crisler Center (12,693); Ann Arbor, MI
Big Ten Tournament
March 15; 12:00 pm, ESPN	No. 3	vs. Illinois; Quarterfinals	W 80–64	27–5	24 – Zeller	11 – Oladipo	7 – Hulls	United Center (N/A); Chicago, IL
March 16; 1:40 pm, CBS	No. 3	vs. No. 22 Wisconsin; Semifinals	L 56–68	27–6	14 – Watford	11 – Zeller	3 – Tied	United Center (–); Chicago, IL
2013 NCAA Tournament
March 22*; 4:22 pm, TBS	No. 4 (1 E)	vs. (16 E) James Madison; Second Round	W 83–62	28–6	16 – Ferrell	8 – Ferrell	6 – Ferrell	University of Dayton Arena (12,353); Dayton, Ohio
March 24*; 3:06 pm, CBS	No. 4 (1 E)	vs. (9 E) Temple; Third Round	W 58–52	29–6	16 – Oladipo	8 – Tied	3 – Ferrell	University of Dayton Arena (12,495); Dayton, Ohio
March 28*; 9:52 pm, CBS	No. 4 (1 E)	vs. No. 16 (4 E) Syracuse; Sweet Sixteen	L 50–61	29–7	16 – Oladipo	10 – Zeller	3 – Hulls	Verizon Center (19,731); Washington, D.C.
*Non-conference game. ^{#}Rankings from AP Poll. (#) Tournament seedings in parentheses. All times are in Eastern Time (#) during NCAA Tournament is seed with Region.

== Rankings ==
Ranking movements Legend: ██ Increase in ranking ██ Decrease in ranking
	Week																			
Poll	Pre	1	2	3	4	5	6	7	8	9	10	11	12	13	14	15	16	17	18	Final
AP	1	1	1	1	1	1	1	6	5	5	2	7	3	1	1	1	1	2	3	4
Coaches	1	1	1	1	1	1	1	6	5	5	2	8	3	1	2	1	1	2	3	7
