= 2012–13 Penn State Nittany Lions basketball team =

American college basketball season

2012–13 Penn State Nittany Lions men's basketball
- Conference: Big Ten Conference
- Record: 10–21 (2–16 Big Ten)
- Head coach: Pat Chambers
- Assistant coaches: Eugene Burroughs; Brian Daly; Keith Urgo
- Home arena: Bryce Jordan Center

2012–13 Big Ten Conference men's basketball standings
	Conf.				Overall
Team	W		L	PCT	W		L	PCT
No. 4 Indiana	14	–	4	.778	29	–	7	.806
No. 7 Ohio State †	13	–	5	.722	29	–	8	.784
No. 9 Michigan State	13	–	5	.722	27	–	9	.750
No. 10 Michigan	12	–	6	.667	31	–	8	.795
No. 18 Wisconsin	12	–	6	.667	23	–	12	.657
Iowa	9	–	9	.500	25	–	13	.658
Illinois	8	–	10	.444	23	–	13	.639
Minnesota	8	–	10	.444	21	–	13	.618
Purdue	8	–	10	.444	16	–	18	.471
Nebraska	5	–	13	.278	15	–	18	.455
Northwestern	4	–	14	.222	13	–	19	.406
Penn State	2	–	16	.111	10	–	21	.323
† 2013 Big Ten tournament winner Rankings from AP Poll

The 2012–13 Penn State Nittany Lions basketball team represented Pennsylvania State University. Head coach Pat Chambers was in his second season with the team. The team played its home games in University Park, Pennsylvania, US at the Bryce Jordan Center.

== Personnel ==
=== Coaching staff ===
Position	Name	Year	Alma mater
Head coach	Pat Chambers	2011	Philadelphia (1994)
Associate head coach	Eugene Burroughs	2011	Richmond (1994)
Assistant coach	Brian Daly	2011	Saint Joseph's (1992)
Assistant coach	Keith Urgo	2011	Fairfield (2002)
Director of Basketball Operations	Ross Condon	2011	Villanova (2007)
Director of player development	Adam Fisher	2011	Penn State (2006)
Strength and conditioning coach	Brad Pantall	2006	Penn State (1996)
Athletic trainer	Jon Salazer	2001	Penn State (1993)
On campus recruiting coordinator	David Caporaletti	2011	Philadelphia University (1993)
Graduate Manager	Brendan Smith	2011	Penn State (2011)

=== Roster ===
Name	No.	Position	Height	Weight	Year	Home town
Akosa Maduegbunam	1	Guard	6–3	200	Freshman	Boston, MA
D. J. Newbill	2	Guard	6–4	210	RS Sophomore	Philadelphia, PA
Donovon Jack	5	Forward	6–9	205	Freshman	Reading, PA
Brandon Taylor	10	Forward	6–8	235	Freshman	Tablenacle, NJ
Jermaine Marshall	11	Guard	6–4	200	RS Junior	Etters, PA
Kevin Montminy	14	Guard	6–3	185	Sophomore	Centre Hall, PA
Nick Colella	20	Guard	6–3	195	Senior	New Castle, PA
Sasa Borovnjak	21	Forward	6–9	235	RS Junior	Belgrade, Serbia
Tim Frazier	23	Guard	6–1	170	Senior	Houston, TX
Jon Graham	25	Forward	6–8	240	RS Sophomore	Baltimore, MD
Patrick Ackerman	32	Forward	6–11	230	Freshman	Rutland, MA
Alan Wisniewski	34	Forward	6–9	230	Sophomore	Sterling Heights, MI
Ross Travis	43	Forward	6–6	220	Sophomore	Chaska, MN

== Schedule and results ==
Date time, TV	Rank^{#}	Opponent^{#}	Result	Record	Site (attendance) city, state
Exhibition
Nov 3*; 4:00 p.m.		Philadelphia	W 79–54	—	Bryce Jordan Center (3,342); University Park, PA
Regular season
Nov 9*; 7:00 p.m.		Saint Francis (PA)	W 65–58	1–0	Bryce Jordan Center (7,329); University Park, PA
Nov 15*; 5:00 p.m., ESPN2		vs. No. 6 NC State; Puerto Rico Tip-Off quarterfinal	L 55–72	1–1	Coliseo Rubén Rodríguez (—); Bayamón, PR
Nov 16*; 7:30 p.m., ESPNU		vs. Providence; Puerto Rico Tip-Off loser bracket	W 55–52 ^{OT}	2–1	Coliseo Rubén Rodríguez (4,224); Bayamón, PR
Nov 18*; 1:30 p.m., ESPNU		vs. Akron; Puerto Rico Tip-Off 5th place game	L 60–85	2–2	Coliseo Rubén Rodríguez (—); Bayamón, PR
Nov 23*; 4:30 p.m.		Bucknell	W 60–57	3–2	Bryce Jordan Center (7,713); University Park, PA
Nov 28*; 9:15 p.m., ESPNU		Boston College; ACC-Big Ten Challenge	L 61–73	3–3	Bryce Jordan Center (6,889); University Park, PA
Dec 1*; 2:00 p.m., ESPN3		Penn	W 58–47	4–3	Bryce Jordan Center (3,982); University Park, PA
Dec 5*; 7:00 p.m., NBCSN		at La Salle	L 57–82	4–4	Palestra (4,382); Philadelphia, PA
Dec 8*; 4:00 p.m., BTN		Army	W 78–70	5–4	Bryce Jordan Center (7,247); University Park, PA
Dec 15*; 2:00 p.m.		Delaware State	W 80–76 ^{OT}	6–4	Bryce Jordan Center (5,751); University Park, PA
Dec 23*; 11:00 a.m., BTN		New Hampshire	W 72–45	7–4	Bryce Jordan Center (—); University Park, PA
Dec 29*; 4:00 p.m., ESPN3		Duquesne	W 84–74	8–4	Bryce Jordan Center (5,521); University Park, PA
Jan 3; 8:30 p.m., BTN		at Wisconsin	L 51–60	8–5 (0–1)	Kohl Center (16,156); Madison, WI
Jan 7; 7:00 p.m., BTN		No. 5 Indiana	L 51–74	8–6 (0–2)	Bryce Jordan Center (9,386); University Park, PA
Jan 10; 8:00 p.m., ESPNU		Northwestern	L 54–70	8–7 (0–3)	Bryce Jordan Center (6,479); University Park, PA
Jan 13; 12:00 p.m., BTN		at Purdue	L 42–60	8–8 (0–4)	Mackey Arena (13,222); West Lafayette, IN
Jan 16; 7:00 p.m., BTN		No. 18 Michigan State	L 72–81	8–9 (0–5)	Bryce Jordan Center (6,585); University Park, PA
Jan 19; 1:00 p.m., ESPNU		Nebraska	L 64–68	8–10 (0–6)	Bryce Jordan Center (9,883); University Park, PA
Jan 23; 7:00 p.m., BTN		at No. 7 Indiana	L 49–72	8–11 (0–7)	Assembly Hall (17,472); Bloomington, IN
Jan 26; 12:00 p.m., ESPN2		No. 14 Ohio State	L 51–65	8–12 (0–8)	Bryce Jordan Center (11,212); University Park, PA
Jan 31; 8:00 p.m., ESPNU		at Iowa	L 67–76	8–13 (0–9)	Carver-Hawkeye Arena (13,369); Iowa City, IA
Feb 5; 7:00 p.m., BTN		Purdue	L 49–58	8–14 (0–10)	Bryce Jordan Center (6,270); University Park, PA
Feb 9; 9:00 p.m., ESPNU		at Nebraska	L 53–67	8–15 (0–11)	Bob Devaney Sports Center (10,853); Lincoln, NE
Feb 14; 9:00 p.m., ESPNU		Iowa	L 72–74	8–16 (0–12)	Bryce Jordan Center (7,636); University Park, PA
Feb 17; 12:00 p.m., BTN		at No. 4 Michigan	L 71–79	8–17 (0–13)	Crisler Center (12,693); Ann Arbor, MI
Feb 21; 8:15 p.m., BTN		at Illinois	L 59–64	8–18 (0–14)	Assembly Hall (14,356); Champaign, IL
Feb 27; 6:30 p.m., BTN		No. 4 Michigan	W 84–78	9–18 (1–14)	Bryce Jordan Center (8,892); University Park, PA
Mar 2; 3:00 p.m., BTN		at Minnesota	L 44–73	9–19 (1–15)	Williams Arena (12,562); Minneapolis, MN
Mar 7; 7:00 p.m., ESPNU		at Northwestern	W 66–59	10–19 (2–15)	Welsh-Ryan Arena (5,517); Evanston, IL
Mar 10; 12:00 p.m., BTN		No. 22 Wisconsin	L 60–63	10–20 (2–16)	Bryce Jordan Center (8,701); University Park, PA
Big Ten tournament
Mar 14; 2:30 p.m., BTN		vs. No. 6 Michigan; First round	L 66–83	10–21	United Center (19,470); Chicago, IL
*Non-conference game. ^{#}Rankings from AP Poll. (#) Tournament seedings in parentheses. All times are in Eastern Time.
