= 2012–13 Minnesota Golden Gophers men's basketball team =

American college basketball season

2012–13 Minnesota Golden Gophers men's basketball

NCAA Tournament, Round of 32
- Conference: Big Ten Conference
- Record: 21–13 (8–10 Big Ten)
- Head coach: Tubby Smith
- Assistant coaches: Ron Jirsa; Saul Smith; Vince Taylor
- Home arena: Williams Arena

2012–13 Big Ten Conference men's basketball standings
| | Conf. | | | | Overall |
| Team | W | | L | PCT | W | | L | PCT |
|---|---|---|---|---|---|---|---|---|
| No. 4 Indiana | 14 | – | 4 | .778 | 29 | – | 7 | .806 |
| No. 7 Ohio State † | 13 | – | 5 | .722 | 29 | – | 8 | .784 |
| No. 9 Michigan State | 13 | – | 5 | .722 | 27 | – | 9 | .750 |
| No. 10 Michigan | 12 | – | 6 | .667 | 31 | – | 8 | .795 |
| No. 18 Wisconsin | 12 | – | 6 | .667 | 23 | – | 12 | .657 |
| Iowa | 9 | – | 9 | .500 | 25 | – | 13 | .658 |
| Illinois | 8 | – | 10 | .444 | 23 | – | 13 | .639 |
| Minnesota | 8 | – | 10 | .444 | 21 | – | 13 | .618 |
| Purdue | 8 | – | 10 | .444 | 16 | – | 18 | .471 |
| Nebraska | 5 | – | 13 | .278 | 15 | – | 18 | .455 |
| Northwestern | 4 | – | 14 | .222 | 13 | – | 19 | .406 |
| Penn State | 2 | – | 16 | .111 | 10 | – | 21 | .323 |
† 2013 Big Ten tournament winner Rankings from AP Poll

The 2012–13 Minnesota Golden Gophers men's basketball team represented the University of Minnesota in the 2012-13 college basketball season. It was the sixth and final season for team's head coach, Tubby Smith, who was fired shortly after the conclusion of the season. The Golden Gophers, members of the Big Ten Conference, played their home games at Williams Arena in Minneapolis, Minnesota. They finished with a record of 21–13 overall, 8–10 in Big Ten for a three-way tie for 7th place. They lost to Illinois in the first round in the 2013 Big Ten Conference men's basketball tournament. They were invited to the 2013 NCAA Division I men's basketball tournament and lost in the third round to Florida.

Coach Tubby Smith's firing was announced on March 25, 2013. On April 3, 2013, it was verbally agreed upon that Richard Pitino would become the new Gophers basketball coach.

== Roster ==
| # | Name | Height | Weight (lbs.) | Position | Class | Hometown | Previous team(s) |
|---|---|---|---|---|---|---|---|
| 00 | Julian Welch | 6'3" | 195 | G | Sr. | Elk Grove, CA, U.S. | Franklin HS |
| 1 | Andre Hollins | 6'1" | 200 | G | So. | Memphis, TN, U.S. | White Station HS |
| 3 | Wally Ellenson | 6'4" | 200 | G | Fr. | Rice Lake, WI, U.S. | Rice Lake HS |
| 10 | Oto Osenieks | 6'8" | 205 | F | RSo. | Riga, Latvia | Brehm Prep |
| 11 | Joe Coleman | 6'4" | 208 | G | So. | Minneapolis, MN, U.S. | Hopkins HS |
| 13 | Maverick Ahanmisi | 6'2" | 192 | G | Jr. | Santa Clarita, CA, U.S. | Stoneridge Prep |
| 15 | Maurice Walker | 6'10" | 289 | F | RSo. | Scarborough, Ontario, Canada | Brewster Academy |
| 20 | Austin Hollins | 6'4" | 185 | G | Jr. | Germantown, TN, U.S. | Germantown HS |
| 22 | Chris Halvorsen | 6'8" | 214 | F | RJr. | St. Paul, MN, U.S. | Henry Sibley HS |
| 24 | Charles Buggs | 6'8" | 198 | F | Fr. | Arlington, TX, U.S. | Hargrave Military Academy |
| 30 | Andre Ingram | 6'7" | 213 | F | Sr. | Minneapolis, MN, U.S. | Minnesota Transitions |
| 32 | Trevor Mbakwe | 6'8" | 245 | F | GSr. | Saint Paul, MN, U.S. | St. Bernard's HS; Miami Dade College |
| 33 | Rodney Williams | 6'7" | 200 | F | Sr. | Minneapolis, MN, U.S. | Robbinsdale Cooper HS |
| 34 | Kendal Shell | 6'0" | 190 | G | So. | St. Louis, MO, U.S. | Webster Groves HS |
| 55 | Elliott Eliason | 6'11" | 260 | C | RSo. | Chadron, NE, U.S. | Chadron HS |

== 2012–13 schedule and results ==
| Date time, TV | Rank^{#} | Opponent^{#} | Result | Record | Site (attendance) city, state |
Exhibition
| 11/01/2012*; 7:00 pm | | Minnesota State | W 81–56 | – | Williams Arena (8,907); Minneapolis, MN |
| 11/05/2012*; 7:00 pm | | Southwest Baptist | W 86–59 | – | Williams Arena (8,654); Minneapolis, MN |
Regular season
| 11/09/2012*; 7:00 pm | | American | W 72–36 | 1–0 | Williams Arena (10,172); Minneapolis, MN |
| 11/12/2012*; 7:00 pm | | Toledo | W 82–56 | 2–0 | Williams Arena (11,028); Minneapolis, MN |
| 11/15/2012*; 7:00 pm, ESPN3 | | Tennessee State | W 72–43 | 3–0 | Williams Arena (10,107); Minneapolis, MN |
| 11/18/2012*; 6:00 pm, BTN | | Richmond | W 72–57 | 4–0 | Williams Arena (11,341); Minneapolis, MN |
| 11/22/2012*; 2:30 pm, AXS TV | | vs. No. 5 Duke; Battle 4 Atlantis Quarterfinal | L 71–89 | 4–1 | Imperial Arena (3,511); Nassau, BAH |
| 11/23/2012*; 12:00 pm, AXS TV | | vs. No. 19 Memphis; Battle 4 Atlantis Consolation round | W 84–75 | 5–1 | Imperial Arena (1,462); Nassau, BAH |
| 11/24/2012*; 2:30 pm, AXS TV | | vs. Stanford; Battle 4 Atlantis 5th place game | W 66–63 | 6–1 | Imperial Arena (1,845); Nassau, BAH |
| 11/27/2012*; 6:15 pm, ESPN2 | No. 21 | at Florida State; ACC–Big Ten Challenge | W 77–68 | 7–1 | Donald L. Tucker Center (7,941); Tallahassee, FL |
| 12/01/2012*; 1:00 pm | No. 21 | North Florida | W 87–59 | 8–1 | Williams Arena (10,173); Minneapolis, MN |
| 12/04/2012*; 7:00 pm, ESPN3 | No. 14 | South Dakota State | W 88–64 | 9–1 | Williams Arena (10,213); Minneapolis, MN |
| 12/08/2012*; 9:30 pm, P12N | No. 14 | at USC | W 71–57 | 10–1 | Galen Center (3,271); Los Angeles, CA |
| 12/11/2012*; 8:00 pm, BTN | No. 13 | North Dakota State | W 70–57 | 11–1 | Williams Arena (10,472); Minneapolis, MN |
| 12/22/2012*; 6:00 pm, BTN | No. 13 | Lafayette | W 75–50 | 12–1 | Williams Arena (14,625); Minneapolis, MN |
Big Ten regular season
| 12/31/2012; 1:00 pm, ESPN2 | No. 9 | No. 18 Michigan State | W 76–63 | 13–1 (1–0) | Williams Arena (14,625); Minneapolis, MN |
| 01/06/2013; 6:00 pm, BTN | No. 9 | Northwestern | W 69–51 | 14–1 (2–0) | Williams Arena (12,750); Minneapolis, MN |
| 01/09/2013; 8:00 pm, BTN | No. 8 | at No. 12 Illinois | W 84–67 | 15–1 (3–0) | Assembly Hall (16,618); Champaign, IL |
| 01/12/2013; 11:00 am, BTN | No. 8 | at No. 5 Indiana | L 81–88 | 15–2 (3–1) | Assembly Hall (17,472); Bloomington, IN |
| 01/17/2013; 6:00 pm, ESPN | No. 9 | No. 5 Michigan | L 75–83 | 15–3 (3–2) | Williams Arena (14,625); Minneapolis, MN |
| 01/23/2013; 8:00 pm, BTN | No. 12 | at Northwestern | L 48–55 | 15–4 (3–3) | Welsh-Ryan Arena (5,112); Evanston, IL |
| 01/26/2013; 1:00 pm, BTN | No. 12 | at Wisconsin | L 44–45 | 15–5 (3–4) | Kohl Center (17,249); Madison, WI |
| 01/29/2013; 8:00 pm, BTN | No. 23 | Nebraska | W 84–65 | 16–5 (4–4) | Williams Arena (12,672); Minneapolis, MN |
| 02/03/2013; 12:00 pm, BTN | No. 23 | Iowa | W 62–59 | 17–5 (5–4) | Williams Arena (14,625); Minneapolis, MN |
| 02/06/2013; 6:00 pm, BTN | No. 18 | at No. 12 Michigan State | L 50–61 | 17–6 (5–5) | Breslin Center (14,797); East Lansing, MI |
| 02/10/2013; 5:00 pm, BTN | No. 18 | Illinois | L 53–57 | 17–7 (5–6) | Williams Arena (14,625); Minneapolis, MN |
| 02/14/2013; 6:00 pm, ESPN | | No. 20 Wisconsin | W 58–53 ^{OT} | 18–7 (6–6) | Williams Arena (14,625); Minneapolis, MN |
| 02/17/2013; 1:00 pm, BTN | | at Iowa | L 51–72 | 18–8 (6–7) | Carver-Hawkeye Arena (15,400); Iowa City, IA |
| 02/20/2013; 6:00 pm, BTN | | at No. 18 Ohio State | L 45–71 | 18–9 (6–8) | Value City Arena (16,378); Columbus, OH |
| 02/26/2013; 6:00 pm, ESPN | | No. 1 Indiana | W 77–73 | 19–9 (7–8) | Williams Arena (14,625); Minneapolis, MN |
| 03/02/2013; 2:00 pm, BTN | | Penn State | W 73–44 | 20–9 (8–8) | Williams Arena (12,562); Minneapolis, MN |
| 03/06/2013; 8:00 pm, BTN | | at Nebraska | L 51–53 | 20–10 (8–9) | Bob Devaney Sports Center (13,194); Lincoln, NE |
| 03/09/2013; 11:00 am, BTN | | at Purdue | L 73–89 | 20–11 (8–10) | Mackey Arena (14,082); West Lafayette, IN |
2013 Big Ten tournament
| 03/14/2013; 11:00 am, BTN | (9) | vs. (8) Illinois; First Round | L 49–51 | 20–12 | United Center (N/A); Chicago, IL |
2013 NCAA tournament
| 03/22/2013*; 9:21 pm, TruTV | (11 S) | vs. (6 S) No. 24 UCLA; Second Round | W 83–63 | 21–12 | Frank Erwin Center (13,825); Austin, TX |
| 03/24/2013*; 5:10 pm, TNT | (11 S) | vs. (3 S) No. 14 Florida; Third Round | L 64–78 | 21–13 | Frank Erwin Center (14,520); Austin, TX |
*Non-conference game. ^{#}Rankings from AP Poll. (#) Tournament seedings in parentheses. All times are in Central Time.

== National Rankings ==
Regular season polls
| Poll | Pre- Season | Week 1 | Week 2 | Week 3 | Week 4 | Week 5 | Week 6 | Week 7 | Week 8 | Week 9 | Week 10 | Week 11 | Week 12 | Week 13 | Week 14 | Week 15 | Week 16 | Week 17 | Week 18 | Final |
|---|---|---|---|---|---|---|---|---|---|---|---|---|---|---|---|---|---|---|---|---|
| AP | RV | RV | RV | 21 | 14 | 13 | 13 | 11 | 9 | 8 | 9 | 12 | 23 | 18 | RV | RV | | | | |
| Coaches | RV | RV | RV | RV | 21 | 16 | 16 | 14 | 13 | 10 | 12 | 14 | 24 | 18 | NR | RV | | | | |

Legend
| | Increase in ranking |
| | Decrease in ranking |
| (RV) | Received Votes |
| T | Tied |
