= 2012–13 Iowa Hawkeyes men's basketball team =

American college basketball season

2012–13 Iowa Hawkeyes men's basketball

NIT Runner-up vs. Baylor, L 54–74
- Conference: Big Ten Conference
- Record: 25–13 (9–9 Big Ten)
- Head coach: Fran McCaffery (3rd season)
- Assistant coaches: Sherman Dillard; Andrew Francis; Kirk Speraw
- Home arena: Carver-Hawkeye Arena (Capacity: 15,400)

2012–13 Big Ten Conference men's basketball standings
	Conf.				Overall
Team	W		L	PCT	W		L	PCT
No. 4 Indiana	14	–	4	.778	29	–	7	.806
No. 7 Ohio State †	13	–	5	.722	29	–	8	.784
No. 9 Michigan State	13	–	5	.722	27	–	9	.750
No. 10 Michigan	12	–	6	.667	31	–	8	.795
No. 18 Wisconsin	12	–	6	.667	23	–	12	.657
Iowa	9	–	9	.500	25	–	13	.658
Illinois	8	–	10	.444	23	–	13	.639
Minnesota	8	–	10	.444	21	–	13	.618
Purdue	8	–	10	.444	16	–	18	.471
Nebraska	5	–	13	.278	15	–	18	.455
Northwestern	4	–	14	.222	13	–	19	.406
Penn State	2	–	16	.111	10	–	21	.323
† 2013 Big Ten tournament winner Rankings from AP Poll

The 2012–2013 Iowa Hawkeyes men's basketball team represented the University of Iowa in the 2012–13 college basketball season. The team was led by 3rd year head coach Fran McCaffery. The Iowa Hawkeyes men’s basketball played their home games at Carver-Hawkeye Arena, which has been their home since 1983. They were members of the Big Ten Conference.

The team finished with a record of 25–13, 9–9 in conference play and finished 6th in the Big Ten. The 25 wins is the most wins in one season for the Hawkeyes since the 2005–2006 season, in which Iowa also had 25 wins. The team went to the 2013 Big Ten Conference men's basketball tournament as a 6th seed where they defeated Northwestern in the 1st round but lost to Michigan State in the Quarterfinals. The team went on to earn a #3 seed in the 2013 National Invitation Tournament where they defeated both Indiana State (68–52) and Stony Brook (75–63) in front of sellout home crowds. Iowa also defeated the #1 seeded Virginia Cavaliers, snapping the Wahoo's 19-game home winning streak, and moving on to the NIT Semifinals for the first time in school history. Iowa advanced to the Championship game after defeating Maryland (71–60) but lost to Baylor (74–54).

== Roster ==
The 2012–13 Iowa Hawkeyes squad contained 16 players which included 4 freshmen, 2 redshirt freshmen, 5 sophomores, 3 juniors, and 2 seniors.

2012–13 Iowa Hawkeyes men's basketball team
Players
Coaches

Pos.	#	Name	Height	Weight	Year	Hometown
C	0	Gabriel Olaseni	6 ft 10 in (2.08 m)	229 lb (104 kg)	So	London, England
F	1	Melsahn Basabe	6 ft 7 in (2.01 m)	221 lb (100 kg)	Jr	Glen Cove, NY
G	2	Josh Oglesby	6 ft 5 in (1.96 m)	202 lb (92 kg)	So	Cedar Rapids, IA
G/F	4	Roy Devyn Marble (C)	6 ft 6 in (1.98 m)	194 lb (88 kg)	Jr	Southfield, MI
G	5	Anthony Clemmons	6 ft 1 in (1.85 m)	192 lb (87 kg)	Fr	Lansing, MI
G	10	Mike Gesell	6 ft 1 in (1.85 m)	185 lb (84 kg)	Fr	South Sioux City, NE
F	11	Christopher Rickert (W)	6 ft 3 in (1.91 m)	180 lb (82 kg)	Sr	Sioux City, IA
G	13	Kyle Denning (W)	6 ft 1 in (1.85 m)	185 lb (84 kg)	So	Cedar Falls, IA
F	15	Zach McCabe	6 ft 7 in (2.01 m)	235 lb (107 kg)	Jr	Sioux City, IA
F	20	Jarrod Uthoff (I)	6 ft 8 in (2.03 m)	200 lb (91 kg)	RS Fr	Cedar Rapids, IA
G	24	Patrick Ingram	6 ft 2 in (1.88 m)	211 lb (96 kg)	Fr	Indianapolis, IN
G	25	Eric May (C)	6 ft 5 in (1.96 m)	219 lb (99 kg)	Sr	Dubuque, IA
F	30	Aaron White	6 ft 8 in (2.03 m)	218 lb (99 kg)	So	Strongsville, OH
C	34	Adam Woodbury	7 ft 1 in (2.16 m)	235 lb (107 kg)	Fr	Sioux City, IA
F	35	Darius Stokes (W)	6 ft 7 in (2.01 m)	203 lb (92 kg)	So	Cedar Rapids, IA
F	42	Kyle Meyer	6 ft 10 in (2.08 m)	222 lb (101 kg)	RS Fr	Alpharetta, GA

Head coach

- Fran McCaffery

Assistant coach(es)

- Sherman Dillard
- Andrew Francis
- Kirk Speraw

Athletic trainer(s)

- John Streif (retired during the season)
- Brad Floy

Legend

- (C) Team captain
- (S) Suspended
- (I) Ineligible
- (W) Walk-on
- Injured
- Current redshirt

Roster
Last update: 2012-8-31

== 2012 Commitments ==
College recruiting information
Name	Hometown	School	Height	Weight	Commit date
Anthony Clemmons; PG	Lansing, MI	Sexton High School	6 ft 1 in (1.85 m)	185 lb (84 kg)	Sep 25, 2011
Anthony Clemmons; PG	Recruit ratings: Scout: Rivals: ESPN: (82)				
Mike Gesell; PG	South Sioux City, NE	South Sioux City High School	6 ft 1 in (1.85 m)	178 lb (81 kg)	Aug 8, 2011
Mike Gesell; PG	Recruit ratings: Scout: Rivals: ESPN: (92)				
Patrick Ingram; SG	Indianapolis, IN	North Central High School	6 ft 3 in (1.91 m)	178 lb (81 kg)	Aug 17, 2011
Patrick Ingram; SG	Recruit ratings: Scout: Rivals: ESPN: (88)				
Kyle Meyer; C	Alpharetta, GA	Northview High School	6 ft 10 in (2.08 m)	215 lb (98 kg)	Mar 14, 2011
Kyle Meyer; C	Recruit ratings: Scout: Rivals: ESPN: (87)				
Adam Woodbury; C	Sioux City, IA	Sioux City East High School	7 ft 0 in (2.13 m)	225 lb (102 kg)	Sep 14, 2011
Adam Woodbury; C	Recruit ratings: Scout: Rivals: ESPN: (95)				
Overall recruit ranking:
Note: In many cases, Scout, Rivals, 247Sports, On3, and ESPN may conflict in their listings of height and weight.; In these cases, the average was taken. ESPN grades are on a 100-point scale.; Sources: "ESPN- Iowa Hawkeyes Men's Basketball Recruiting". ESPN.; "2012 Team Ranking". Rivals.

== Schedule and results ==
Date time, TV	Rank^{#}	Opponent^{#}	Result	Record	Site (attendance) city, state
Exhibition
11/04/2012*; 1:00 pm		Quincy (IL)	W 100–54	–	Carver-Hawkeye Arena (12,251); Iowa City, IA
Regular Season
11/09/2012*; 8:00 pm		Texas–Pan American	W 86–55	1–0	Carver-Hawkeye Arena (14,859); Iowa City, IA
11/12/2012*; 6:30 pm, BTN		Central Michigan	W 73–61	2–0	Carver-Hawkeye Arena (10,578); Iowa City, IA
11/15/2011*; 7:00 pm		Howard; Cancún Challenge	W 66–36	3–0	Carver-Hawkeye Arena (10,704); Iowa City, IA
11/17/2012*; 7:00 pm, BTN		Gardner-Webb; Cancún Challenge	W 65–56	4–0	Carver-Hawkeye Arena (11,852); Iowa City, IA
11/20/2012*; 8:30 pm, CBSSN		vs. WKU; Cancún Challenge semifinals	W 63–55	5–0	Moon Palace Resort (902); Cancún, MX
11/21/2012*; 8:30 pm, CBSSN		vs. Wichita State; Cancún Challenge Championship	L 63–75	5–1	Moon Palace Resort (902); Cancún, MX
11/27/2012*; 6:15 pm, ESPNU		at Virginia Tech; ACC–Big Ten Challenge	L 79–95	5–2	Cassell Coliseum (5,647); Blacksburg, VA
12/01/2012*; 12:00 pm		Texas A&M-Corpus Christi	W 88–59	6–2	Carver-Hawkeye Arena (12,628); Iowa City, IA
12/04/2012*; 7:00 pm		South Dakota	W 87–63	7–2	Carver-Hawkeye Arena (11,269); Iowa City, IA
12/07/2012*; 7:00 pm, BTN		Iowa State; Iowa Corn Cy-Hawk Series	W 80–71	8–2	Carver-Hawkeye Arena (15,127); Iowa City, IA
12/15/2012*; 1:30 pm, BTN		vs. Northern Iowa; Big Four Classic	W 80–73	9–2	Wells Fargo Arena (13,180); Des Moines, IA
12/19/2012*; 8:00 pm, BTN		South Carolina State	W 90–46	10–2	Carver-Hawkeye Arena (12,158); Iowa City, IA
12/22/2012*; 12:00 pm, BTN		Coppin State	W 80–50	11–2	Carver-Hawkeye Arena (13,060); Iowa City, IA
12/31/2012; 3:00 pm, ESPN2		No. 5 Indiana	L 65–69	11–3 (0–1)	Carver-Hawkeye Arena (15,400); Iowa City, IA
01/06/2013; 11:00 am, BTN		at No. 2 Michigan	L 67–95	11–4 (0–2)	Crisler Center (12,693); Ann Arbor, MI
01/10/2013; 6:00 pm, ESPN2		No. 22 Michigan State	L 59–62	11–5 (0–3)	Carver-Hawkeye Arena (12,872); Iowa City, IA
01/13/2013; 4:30 pm, ESPNU		at Northwestern	W 70–50	12–5 (1–3)	Welsh-Ryan Arena (6,805); Evanston, IL
01/19/2013; 7:00 pm, BTN		Wisconsin	W 70–66	13–5 (2–3)	Carver-Hawkeye Arena (15,400); Iowa City, IA
01/22/2013; 5:30 pm, BTN		at No. 14 Ohio State	L 63–72	13–6 (2–4)	Value City Arena (16,040); Columbus, OH
01/27/2013; 2:30 pm, BTN		at Purdue	L 62–65 ^{OT}	13–7 (2–5)	Mackey Arena (13,671); West Lafayette, IN
01/31/2013; 7:00 pm, ESPNU		Penn State	W 76–67	14–7 (3–5)	Carver-Hawkeye Arena (13,369); Iowa City, IA
02/03/2013; 12:00 pm, BTN		at No. 23 Minnesota	L 59–62	14–8 (3–6)	Williams Arena (14,625); Minneapolis, MN
02/06/2013; 8:00 pm, BTN		at Wisconsin	L 70–74 ^{2OT}	14–9 (3–7)	Kohl Center (17,121); Madison, WI
02/09/2013; 3:30 pm, BTN		Northwestern	W 71–57	15–9 (4–7)	Carver-Hawkeye Arena (15,267); Iowa City, IA
02/14/2013; 8:00 pm, ESPNU		at Penn State	W 74–72	16–9 (5–7)	Bryce Jordan Center (7,636); University Park, PA
02/17/2013; 1:00 pm, BTN		Minnesota	W 72–51	17–9 (6–7)	Carver-Hawkeye Arena (15,400); Iowa City, IA
02/23/2013; 1:00 pm		at Nebraska	L 60–64	17–10 (6–8)	Bob Devaney Sports Center (12,334); Lincoln, NE
02/27/2013; 7:36 pm, BTN		Purdue	W 58–48	18–10 (7–8)	Carver-Hawkeye Arena (11,787); Iowa City, IA
03/02/2013; 6:30 pm, BTN		at No. 1 Indiana	L 60–73	18–11 (7–9)	Assembly Hall (17,472); Bloomington, IN
03/05/2013; 6:00 pm, BTN		Illinois	W 63–55	19–11 (8–9)	Carver-Hawkeye Arena (14,566); Iowa City, IA
03/09/2013; 1:21 pm, BTN		Nebraska	W 74–60	20–11 (9–9)	Carver-Hawkeye Arena (15,400); Iowa City, IA
2013 Big Ten Conference men's basketball tournament
03/14/2013; 8:00 pm, ESPN2		vs. Northwestern; First Round	W 73–59	21–11	United Center (19,667); Chicago, IL
03/15/2013; 8:00 pm, BTN		vs. No. 8 Michigan State; Quarterfinals	L 56–59	21–12	United Center (21,229); Chicago, IL
2013 National Invitation Tournament
03/20/2013*; 6:00 pm, ESPN2	No. (S 3)	No. (S 6) Indiana State; First Round	W 68–52	22–12	Carver-Hawkeye Arena (15,400); Iowa City, IA
03/22/2013*; 8:30 pm, ESPNU	No. (S 3)	No. (S 7) Stony Brook; Second Round	W 75–63	23–12	Carver-Hawkeye Arena (15,400); Iowa City, IA
03/27/2013*; 6:00 pm, ESPN2	No. (S 3)	at No. (S 1) Virginia; Quarterfinals	W 75–64	24–12	John Paul Jones Arena (11,141); Charlottesville, VA
04/02/2013*; 8:30 pm, ESPN2	No. (S 3)	vs. No. (S 2) Maryland; Semifinals	W 71–60	25–12	Madison Square Garden (10,009); New York City, NY
04/04/2013*; 8:00 pm, ESPN	No. (S 3)	vs. No. (S 2) Baylor; Championship	L 54–74	25–13	Madison Square Garden (5,301); New York City, NY
*Non-conference game. ^{#}Rankings from AP Poll. (#) Tournament seedings in parentheses.
