= 2013 Big Ten men's basketball tournament =

- Classification: Division I
- Season: 2012–13
- Teams: 12
- Site: United Center; Chicago, Illinois
- Champions: Ohio State (4th title)
- Winning coach: Thad Matta (4th title)
- MVP: Aaron Craft (Ohio State)
- Television: BTN, ESPN, ESPN2, and CBS

2012–13 Big Ten Conference men's basketball standings
	Conf.				Overall
Team	W		L	PCT	W		L	PCT
No. 4 Indiana	14	–	4	.778	29	–	7	.806
No. 7 Ohio State †	13	–	5	.722	29	–	8	.784
No. 9 Michigan State	13	–	5	.722	27	–	9	.750
No. 10 Michigan	12	–	6	.667	31	–	8	.795
No. 18 Wisconsin	12	–	6	.667	23	–	12	.657
Iowa	9	–	9	.500	25	–	13	.658
Illinois	8	–	10	.444	23	–	13	.639
Minnesota	8	–	10	.444	21	–	13	.618
Purdue	8	–	10	.444	16	–	18	.471
Nebraska	5	–	13	.278	15	–	18	.455
Northwestern	4	–	14	.222	13	–	19	.406
Penn State	2	–	16	.111	10	–	21	.323
† 2013 Big Ten tournament winner Rankings from AP Poll

The 2013 Big Ten men's basketball tournament was held from March 14 through March 17 at United Center in Chicago, Illinois. The tournament was the sixteenth annual Big Ten men's basketball tournament and second to feature 12 teams. The championship was won by Ohio State who defeated Wisconsin in the championship game. As a result, Ohio State received the Big Ten's automatic bid to the NCAA tournament. The win marked Ohio State's fourth tournament championship, though one championship has since been vacated.

== Seeds ==
All 12 Big Ten schools participated in the tournament. Teams were seeded by conference record, with a tiebreaker system used to seed teams with identical conference records. Seeding for the tournament was determined at the close of the regular conference season. The top four teams received a first-round bye. Tiebreaking procedures were unchanged from the 2012 tournament.

Seeding for the tournament was determined at the close of the regular season.

Seed	School	Conf	Tiebreaker 1	Tiebreaker 2
1	Indiana	14–4		
2	Ohio State	13–5	1–1 vs MSU	1–1 vs Ind
3	Michigan State	13–5	1–1 vs OSU	0–2 vs Ind
4	Wisconsin	12–6	1–0 vs Mich	
5	Michigan	12–6	0–1 vs Wis	
6	Iowa	9–9		
7	Purdue	8–10	2–1 vs Ill, Minn	
8	Illinois	8–10	2–2 vs Pur, Minn	
9	Minnesota	8–10	1–2 vs Pur, Ill	
10	Nebraska	5–13		
11	Northwestern	4–14		
12	Penn State	2–16		

== Schedule ==
Session	Game	Time*	Matchup^{#}	Television	Score
First round - Thursday, March 14
1	1	11:00am	#9 Minnesota vs. #8 Illinois	BTN	49–51
1	2	1:30pm	#12 Penn State vs. #5 Michigan	BTN	66–83
2	3	5:30pm	#10 Nebraska vs. #7 Purdue	ESPN2	57–55
2	4	8:00pm	#11 Northwestern vs. #6 Iowa	ESPN2	59–73
Quarterfinals - Friday, March 15
3	5	11:00am	#8 Illinois vs. #1 Indiana	ESPN	64–80
3	6	1:30pm	#5 Michigan vs. #4 Wisconsin	ESPN	59–68
4	7	5:30pm	#10 Nebraska vs. #2 Ohio State	BTN	50–71
4	8	8:00pm	#6 Iowa vs. #3 Michigan State	BTN	56–59
Semifinals - Saturday, March 16
5	9	12:40pm	#4 Wisconsin vs. #1 Indiana	CBS	68–56
5	10	3:00pm	#3 Michigan State vs. #2 Ohio State	CBS	58–61
Championship - Sunday, March 17
6	11	2:30pm	#4 Wisconsin vs. #2 Ohio State	CBS	43–50

*Game times in Central Time.

== Bracket ==
First round Thursday, March 14; BTN/ESPN2
8	Illinois	51
9	Minnesota	49
5	#6 Michigan	83
12	Penn State	66
7	Purdue	55
10	Nebraska	57
6	Iowa	73
11	Northwestern	59

Quarterfinals; Friday, March 15; ESPN/BTN
1	#3 Indiana	80
8	Illinois	64
4	#22 Wisconsin	68
5	#6 Michigan	59
2	#10 Ohio State	71
10	Nebraska	50
3	#8 Michigan State	59
6	Iowa	56

Semifinals; Saturday, March 16; CBS
1	#3 Indiana	56
4	#22 Wisconsin	68
2	#10 Ohio State	61
3	#8 Michigan State	58

Championship; Sunday, March 17; CBS
4	#22 Wisconsin	43
2	#10 Ohio State	50

== Honors ==
=== All-Tournament Team ===
- Aaron Craft, Ohio State – Big Ten tournament Most Outstanding Player
- Deshaun Thomas, Ohio State
- Ryan Evans, Wisconsin
- Traevon Jackson, Wisconsin
- Cody Zeller, Indiana
