= 2012–13 Northwestern Wildcats men's basketball team =

American college basketball season

2012–13 Northwestern Wildcats men's basketball

South Padre Island Invitational Champions
- Conference: Big Ten Conference
- Record: 13–19 (4–14 Big Ten)
- Head coach: Bill Carmody
- Assistant coaches: Fred Hill; Tavaras Hardy; Ivan Vujic
- Home arena: Welsh-Ryan Arena

2012–13 Big Ten Conference men's basketball standings
	Conf.				Overall
Team	W		L	PCT	W		L	PCT
No. 4 Indiana	14	–	4	.778	29	–	7	.806
No. 7 Ohio State †	13	–	5	.722	29	–	8	.784
No. 9 Michigan State	13	–	5	.722	27	–	9	.750
No. 10 Michigan	12	–	6	.667	31	–	8	.795
No. 18 Wisconsin	12	–	6	.667	23	–	12	.657
Iowa	9	–	9	.500	25	–	13	.658
Illinois	8	–	10	.444	23	–	13	.639
Minnesota	8	–	10	.444	21	–	13	.618
Purdue	8	–	10	.444	16	–	18	.471
Nebraska	5	–	13	.278	15	–	18	.455
Northwestern	4	–	14	.222	13	–	19	.406
Penn State	2	–	16	.111	10	–	21	.323
† 2013 Big Ten tournament winner Rankings from AP Poll

The 2012–13 Northwestern Wildcats men's basketball team represented Northwestern University in the 2012–13 college basketball season. This was head coach Bill Carmody's thirteenth and final season at Northwestern; on March 16, 2013, the university announced that he would not return to the team. The Wildcats were members of the Big Ten Conference and played their home games at Welsh-Ryan Arena.

== 2012–13 Roster ==
No.	Name	Position	Ht.	Wt.	Year	Hometown/High School
0	Alejandro Nate Carter	G	6–3	185	FR	Chicago, IL / MPHS
1	Drew Crawford	G/F	6–5	210	SR	Naperville, IL / Naperville Central
3	Dave Sobolewski	G	6–1	190	SO	Naperville, IL / Benet Academy
4	Alex Marcotullio	G	6–3	195	SR	Warren, MI / De La Salle
10	Mike Turner	F	6–8	215	RS FR	Chicago, IL / University of Chicago Lab. School
11	Reggie Hearn	G	6–4	210	JR	Fort Wayne, IN / Snider HS
12	Jared Swopshire	F	6–8	210	GS	St. Louis, MO / Louisville
13	Kale Abrahamson	G	6–7	195	FR	West Des Moines, IA / Valley HS
14	Tre Demps	G	6–2	195	RS FR	San Antonio, TX / Ronald Reagan HS
15	James Montgomery III	G	6–4	190	JR	Los Angeles, CA / Santa Monica
22	Alex Olah	C	7–0	275	FR	Timișoara, Romania / Traders Point Christian Academy
23	JerShon Cobb	G	6–5	205	SO	Decatur, GA / Columbia HS
31	Aaron Liberman	F/C	6–10	215	FR	Los Angeles, CA / Valley Torah HS
34	Sanjay Lumpkin	G/F	6–6	195	FR	Wayzata, MN / Benilde-St. Margaret's
42	Chier Ajou	C	7–2	235	FR	Aweil, South Sudan / Culver Academies / St. Thomas More
45	Nikola Cerina	F	6–9	245	RS JR	Topola, Serbia / Nikola Tesla Secondary School

== Schedule and results ==
Date time, TV	Rank^{#}	Opponent^{#}	Result	Record	Site (attendance) city, state
Exhibition
11/07/2012*; 7:00 pm		Chicago	W 70–46	–	Welsh-Ryan Arena (N/A); Evanston, IL
Regular season
11/13/2012*; 7:00 pm, BTN		Texas Southern	W 79–49	1–0	Welsh-Ryan Arena (5,043); Evanston, IL
11/15/2012*; 7:00 pm		Mississippi Valley State	W 81–68	2–0	Welsh-Ryan Arena (5,004); Evanston, IL
11/18/2012*; 1:00 pm		Fairleigh Dickinson; South Padre Island Invitational	W 80–53	3–0	Welsh-Ryan Arena (5,104); Evanston, IL
11/20/2012*; 7:00 pm		Delaware State; South Padre Island Invitational	W 69–50	4–0	Welsh-Ryan Arena (5,012); Evanston, IL
11/23/2012*; 7:30 pm		vs. TCU; South Padre Island Invitational semifinals	W 55–31	5–0	South Padre Island Convention Centre (N/A); South Padre Island, TX
11/24/2012*; 7:00 pm, CBSSN		vs. Illinois State; South Padre Island Invitational Championship	W 72–69 ^{OT}	6–0	South Padre Island Convention Centre (N/A); South Padre Island, TX
11/27/2012*; 8:15 pm, ESPN2		Maryland; ACC-Big Ten Challenge	L 57–77	6–1	Welsh-Ryan Arena (6,009); Evanston, IL
12/01/2012*; 1:00 pm, CSNC		UIC	L 44–50	6–2	Welsh-Ryan Arena (5,838); Evanston, IL
12/04/2012*; 8:00 pm, ESPN2		at Baylor	W 74–70	7–2	Ferrell Center (6,532); Waco, TX
12/08/2012*; 7:00 pm, BTN		Butler	L 65–74	7–3	Welsh-Ryan Arena (7,213); Evanston, IL
12/17/2012*; 6:00 pm, BTN		Texas State	W 74–68	8–3	Welsh-Ryan Arena (5,161); Evanston, IL
12/21/2012*; 8:00 pm, BTN		Stanford	L 68–70	8–4	Welsh-Ryan Arena (6,718); Evanston, IL
12/23/2012*; 12:30 pm		Brown	W 63–42	9–4	Welsh-Ryan Arena (6,342); Evanston, IL
01/03/2013; 6:00 pm, ESPN2		No. 2 Michigan	L 66–94	9–5 (0–1)	Welsh-Ryan Arena (8,117); Evanston, IL
01/06/2013; 6:00 pm, BTN		at No. 9 Minnesota	L 51–69	9–6 (0–2)	Williams Arena (12,750); Minneapolis, MN
01/10/2013; 7:00 pm, ESPNU		at Penn State	W 70–54	10–6 (1–2)	Bryce Jordan Center (6,479); University Park, PA
01/13/2013; 4:30 pm, ESPNU		Iowa	L 50–70	10–7 (1–3)	Welsh-Ryan Arena (6,805); Evanston, IL
01/17/2013; 7:15 pm, BTN		at No. 23 Illinois	W 68–54	11–7 (2–3)	Assembly Hall (16,618); Champaign, IL
01/20/2013; 12:00 pm, BTN		No. 2 Indiana	L 59–67	11–8 (2–4)	Welsh-Ryan Arena (8,117); Evanston, IL
01/23/2013; 8:00 pm, BTN		No. 12 Minnesota	W 55–48	12–8 (3–4)	Welsh-Ryan Arena (5,112); Evanston, IL
01/26/2013; 2:00 pm, ESPNU		at Nebraska	L 49–64	12–9 (3–5)	Bob Devaney Sports Center (10,216); Lincoln, NE
01/30/2013; 5:30 pm, BTN		at No. 1 Michigan	L 46–68	12–10 (3–6)	Crisler Center (12,693); Ann Arbor, MI
02/02/2013; 11:00 am, ESPN2		Purdue	W 75–60	13–10 (4–6)	Welsh-Ryan Arena (8,117); Evanston, IL
02/09/2013; 3:30 pm, BTN		at Iowa	L 57–71	13–11 (4–7)	Carver-Hawkeye Arena (15,267); Iowa City, IA
02/14/2013; 6:00 pm, BTN		at No. 13 Ohio State	L 59–69	13–12 (4–8)	Value City Arena (15,842); Columbus, OH
02/17/2013; 6:30 pm, BTN		Illinois	L 41–62	13–13 (4–9)	Welsh-Ryan Arena (8,117); Evanston, IL
02/20/2013; 8:00 pm, BTN		No. 19 Wisconsin	L 41–69	13–14 (4–10)	Welsh-Ryan Arena (7,011); Evanston, IL
02/24/2013; 5:00 pm, BTN		at Purdue	L 43–74	13–15 (4–11)	Mackey Arena (13,445); West Lafayette, IN
02/28/2013; 6:00 pm, ESPN2		No. 16 Ohio State	L 53–63	13–16 (4–12)	Welsh-Ryan Arena (7,036); Evanston, IL
03/07/2013; 6:00 pm, ESPNU		Penn State	L 59–66	13–17 (4–13)	Welsh-Ryan Arena (5,517); Evanston, IL
03/10/2013; 5:00 pm, BTN		at No. 10 Michigan State	L 61–71	13–18 (4–14)	Breslin Center (14,797); East Lansing, MI
Big Ten tournament
03/14/2013; 8:00 pm, ESPN2		vs. Iowa; First Round	L 59–73	13–19	United Center (19,667); Chicago, IL
*Non-conference game. ^{#}Rankings from AP Poll. (#) Tournament seedings in parentheses.
