= 2012–13 Wisconsin Badgers men's basketball team =

American college basketball season

2012–13 Wisconsin Badgers men's basketball

NCAA tournament, First round
- Conference: Big Ten Conference

Ranking
- Coaches: No. 22
- AP: No. 18
- Record: 23–12 (12–6 Big Ten)
- Head coach: Bo Ryan
- Associate head coach: Greg Gard
- Assistant coaches: Gary Close; Lamont Paris
- Home arena: Kohl Center

2012–13 Big Ten Conference men's basketball standings
	Conf.				Overall
Team	W		L	PCT	W		L	PCT
No. 4 Indiana	14	–	4	.778	29	–	7	.806
No. 7 Ohio State †	13	–	5	.722	29	–	8	.784
No. 9 Michigan State	13	–	5	.722	27	–	9	.750
No. 10 Michigan	12	–	6	.667	31	–	8	.795
No. 18 Wisconsin	12	–	6	.667	23	–	12	.657
Iowa	9	–	9	.500	25	–	13	.658
Illinois	8	–	10	.444	23	–	13	.639
Minnesota	8	–	10	.444	21	–	13	.618
Purdue	8	–	10	.444	16	–	18	.471
Nebraska	5	–	13	.278	15	–	18	.455
Northwestern	4	–	14	.222	13	–	19	.406
Penn State	2	–	16	.111	10	–	21	.323
† 2013 Big Ten tournament winner Rankings from AP Poll

The 2012–13 Wisconsin Badgers men's basketball team represented the University of Wisconsin–Madison during the 2012–13 NCAA Division I men's basketball season. This was Bo Ryan's 12th season as head coach at Wisconsin. The Badgers played their home games at the Kohl Center and were members of the Big Ten Conference. They finished the season 23–12, 12–6 in Big Ten play to tie for fourth place. The team advanced to the championship game of the 2013 Big Ten tournament where it lost to Ohio State. Wisconsin received an at-large bid to the 2013 NCAA tournament where the team lost in the second round to Ole Miss.

== 2012 Commitments ==
College recruiting information
Name	Hometown	School	Height	Weight	Commit date
Sam Dekker; SF	Sheboygan, WI	Sheboygan Lutheran	6 ft 7 in (2.01 m)	195 lb (88 kg)	Jun 15, 2010
Sam Dekker; SF	Recruit ratings: Scout: Rivals: ESPN: (97)				
Zak Showalter; SG	Germantown, WI	Germantown	6 ft 2 in (1.88 m)	200 lb (91 kg)	Jun 13, 2012
Zak Showalter; SG	Recruit ratings: Scout: Rivals: ESPN: (NR)				
Overall recruit ranking:
Note: In many cases, Scout, Rivals, 247Sports, On3, and ESPN may conflict in their listings of height and weight.; In these cases, the average was taken. ESPN grades are on a 100-point scale.; Sources: "2012 Team Ranking". Rivals.

== Awards ==
All-Big Ten by Media

- Bo Ryan - Coach of the Year
- Jarred Berggren - 2nd team
- Ben Brust - Honorable mention
- Sam Dekker - Honorable mention

All-Big Ten by Coaches

- Bo Ryan - Coach of the Year
- Jarred Berggren - 2nd team & All-Defensive team
- Ben Brust - Honorable mention
- Sam Dekker - All-Freshman team

== Roster ==
2012–13 Wisconsin Badgers men's basketball team
Players
Coaches

Pos.	#	Name	Height	Weight	Year	Hometown
G	1	Ben Brust	6 ft 1 in (1.85 m)	195 lb (88 kg)	Jr	Hawthorn Woods, IL
G	2	Jordan Smith (W)	6 ft 1 in (1.85 m)	175 lb (79 kg)	So	Orono, MN
G	3	George Marshall	5 ft 11 in (1.8 m)	185 lb (84 kg)	RS Fr	Chicago, IL
G/F	5	Ryan Evans	6 ft 6 in (1.98 m)	208 lb (94 kg)	RS Sr	Phoenix, AZ
G	10	Dan Fahey (W)	6 ft 3 in (1.91 m)	195 lb (88 kg)	Sr	Chicago, IL
G	12	Traevon Jackson	6 ft 2 in (1.88 m)	213 lb (97 kg)	So	Westerville, OH
F	13	Duje Dukan (injured) (redshirt)	6 ft 8 in (2.03 m)	210 lb (95 kg)	Jr	Deerfield, IL
F	15	Sam Dekker	6 ft 7 in (2.01 m)	220 lb (100 kg)	Fr	Sheboygan, WI
G	21	Josh Gasser (injured) (redshirt)	6 ft 3 in (1.91 m)	190 lb (86 kg)	Jr	Port Washington, WI
G	22	J. D. Wise (W)	6 ft 0 in (1.83 m)	190 lb (86 kg)	Sr	Milwaukee, WI
F	31	Mike Bruesewitz	6 ft 6 in (1.98 m)	223 lb (101 kg)	Sr	St. Paul, MN
C	32	Evan Anderson	6 ft 10 in (2.08 m)	255 lb (116 kg)	RS So	Stanley, WI
G	33	Zak Showalter	6 ft 2 in (1.88 m)	195 lb (88 kg)	Fr	Germantown, WI
F	34	Zach Bohannon	6 ft 6 in (1.98 m)	210 lb (95 kg)	RS Jr	Marion, IA
F/C	40	Jared Berggren	6 ft 10 in (2.08 m)	235 lb (107 kg)	RS Sr	Princeton, MN
F	44	Frank Kaminsky	7 ft 0 in (2.13 m)	230 lb (104 kg)	So	Lisle, IL

Head coach

- Bo Ryan (Wilkes)

Assistant coach(es)

- Greg Gard (UW-Platteville)
- Gary Close (Arizona State)
- Lamont Paris (Wooster)

Legend

- (C) Team captain
- (S) Suspended
- (I) Ineligible
- (W) Walk-on
- Injured
- Current redshirt

Roster
Last update: 2012-26-09

== Schedule and results ==
Date time, TV	Rank^{#}	Opponent^{#}	Result	Record	High points	High rebounds	High assists	Site (attendance) city, state
Exhibition
11/07/2012*; 7:00 pm, BTN.com	No. 23	UW–Oshkosh	W 96–44	-	16 – Berggren	10 – Evans	4 – Jackson	Kohl Center (16,488); Madison, WI
Regular Season
11/11/2012*; 1:00 pm, ESPN3	No. 23	Southeastern Louisiana	W 87–47	1–0	19 – Berggren (1)	11 – Brust (1)	3 – Brust (1)	Kohl Center (16,662); Madison, WI
11/14/2012*; 6:00 pm, ESPN2	No. 22	at No. 10 Florida	L 56–74	1–1	11 – Berggren (2), Dekker (1)	6 – Berggren (1)	3 – Jackson (1), Dekker (1)	O'Connell Center (9,614); Gainesville, FL
11/18/2012*; 5:00 pm, ESPN3	No. 22	Cornell; Las Vegas Invitational	W 73–40	2–1	18 – Berggren (3), Brust (1)	12 – Brust (2)	4 – Brust (2)	Kohl Center (16,657); Madison, WI
11/20/2012*; 7:00 pm, ESPN3		Presbyterian; Las Vegas Invitational	W 88–43	3–1	20 – Brust (2)	12 – Brust (3)	4 – Bruesewitz (1), Evans (1)	Kohl Center (16,656); Madison, WI
11/23/2012*; 9:00 pm, ESPN2		vs. No. 12 Creighton; Las Vegas Invitational semifinal	L 74–84	3–2	27 – Berggren (4)	8 – Evans (1)	3 – Evans (2)	Orleans Arena (N/A); Paradise, NV
11/24/2012*; 7:00 pm, ESPN3		vs. Arkansas; Las Vegas Invitational 3rd place game	W 77–70	4–2	19 – Dekker (2)	9 – Berggren (2), Bruesewitz (1)	3 – Berggren (1)	Orleans Arena (N/A); Paradise, NV
11/28/2012*; 6:00 pm, ESPN2		Virginia; ACC – Big Ten Challenge	L 54–60	4–3	15 – Brust (3)	6 – Evans (2)	5 – Jackson (2)	Kohl Center (16,690); Madison, WI
12/02/2012*; 3:00 pm, BTN		California	W 81–56	5–3	22 – Brust (4)	8 – Berggren (3), Bruesewitz (2)	4 – Brust (3)	Kohl Center (16,596); Madison, WI
12/04/2012*; 7:00 pm, ESPN3		Nebraska–Omaha	W 86–40	6–3	15 – Brust (5)	11 – Evans (3)	3 – Brust (4), Bruesewitz (2), Dekker (2)	Kohl Center (16,546); Madison, WI
12/08/2012*; 5:00 pm, ESPN2		at Marquette	L 50–60	6–4	9 – Berggren (5), Evans (1)	8 – Dekker (1)	6 – Brust (5)	Bradley Center (18,588); Milwaukee, WI
12/12/2012*; 8:00 pm, BTN		Green Bay	W 65–54	7–4	13 – Evans (2)	7 – Evans (3)	5 – Brust (6)	Kohl Center (16,746); Madison, WI
12/22/2012*; 8:15 pm, BTN		Milwaukee	W 74–53	8–4	19 – Evans (3)	7 – Berggren (4), Evans (4)	4 – Brust (7), Evans (3)	Kohl Center (16,465); Madison, WI
12/29/2012*; 1:00 pm, BTN.com		Samford	W 87–51	9–4	16 – Kaminsky (1)	12 – Evans (5)	6 – Brust (8)	Kohl Center (16,376); Madison, WI
01/03/2013; 7:30 pm, BTN		Penn State	W 60–51	10–4 (1–0)	13 – Berggren (6), Brust (6), Evans (4)	9 – Evans (6)	4 – Brust (9)	Kohl Center (16,156); Madison, WI
01/06/2013; 3:30 pm, BTN		at Nebraska	W 47–41	11–4 (2–0)	13 – Berggren (7)	15 – Evans (7)	3 – Jackson (3)	Bob Devaney Sports Center (9,805); Lincoln, NE
01/12/2013; 1:15 pm, BTN		No. 12 Illinois	W 74–51	12–4 (3–0)	15 – Berggren (8)	12 – Berggren (5)	3 – Brust (10), Dekker (3)	Kohl Center (17,249); Madison, WI
01/15/2013; 8:00 pm, ESPN		at No. 2 Indiana	W 64–59	13–4 (4–0)	13 – Evans (5)	8 – Evans (8)	4 – Bruesewitz (3)	Assembly Hall (17,472); Bloomington, IN
01/19/2013; 7:00 pm, BTN		at Iowa	L 66–70	13–5 (4–1)	20 – Marshall (1)	9 – Bruesewitz (3)	4 – Dekker (4)	Carver-Hawkeye Arena (15,400); Iowa City, IA
01/22/2013; 6:00 pm, ESPN		No. 13 Michigan State	L 47–49	13–6 (4–2)	10 – Bruesewitz (1)	11 – Evans (9)	3 – Jackson (4), Berggren (2)	Kohl Center (17,249); Madison, WI
01/26/2013; 1:00 pm, BTN		No. 12 Minnesota	W 45–44	14–6 (5–2)	10 – Evans (6), Dekker (3)	8 – Evans (10)	3 – Brust (11), Evans (4)	Kohl Center (17,249); Madison, WI
01/29/2013; 6:00 pm, ESPN		at No. 11 Ohio State	L 49–58	14–7 (5–3)	12 – Jackson (1)	9 – Berggren (6)	3 – Brust (12), Evans (5)	Value City Arena (16,911); Columbus, OH
02/03/2013; 2:30 pm, BTN		at Illinois	W 74–68	15–7 (6–3)	20 – Brust (7)	9 – Evans (11)	2 – Evans (6), Jackson (5), Dekker (5), Bruesewitz (4)	Assembly Hall (15,073); Champaign, IL
02/06/2013; 8:00 pm, BTN		Iowa	W 74–70 ^{2OT}	16–7 (7–3)	18 – Brust (8)	14 – Berggren (7)	5 – Evans (7)	Kohl Center (17,121); Madison, WI
02/09/2013; 11:00 am, ESPN		No. 3 Michigan	W 65–62 ^{OT}	17–7 (8–3)	14 – Brust (9)	9 – Evans (12)	5 – Jackson (6)	Kohl Center (17,249); Madison, WI
02/14/2013; 6:00 pm, ESPN	No. 20	at Minnesota	L 53–58 ^{OT}	17–8 (8–4)	14 – Dekker (4)	11 – Evans (13)	2 – Jackson (7)	Williams Arena (14,625); Minneapolis, MN
02/17/2013; 12:00 pm, CBS	No. 20	No. 13 Ohio State	W 71–49	18–8 (9–4)	15 – Brust (10), Berggren (9)	11 – Brust (4)	4 – Jackson (8), Bruesewitz (5)	Kohl Center (17,249); Madison, WI
02/20/2013; 8:00 pm, BTN	No. 19	at Northwestern	W 69–41	19–8 (10–4)	12 – Brust (11), Berggren (10)	8 – Berggren (8), Brust (5)	5 – Jackson (9)	Welsh-Ryan Arena (7,011); Evanston, IL
02/26/2013; 8:00 pm, BTN	No. 17	Nebraska	W 77–46	20–8 (11–4)	19 – Dekker (5)	9 – Bruesewitz (4)	5 – Jackson (10)	Kohl Center (17,026); Madison, WI
03/03/2013; 12:00 pm, ESPN	No. 17	Purdue	L 56–69	20–9 (11–5)	13 – Berggren (11)	8 – Berggren (9)	4 – Evans (8)	Kohl Center (17,230); Madison, WI
03/07/2013; 8:00 pm, ESPN	No. 22	at No. 10 Michigan State	L 43–58	20–10 (11–6)	10 – Brust (12)	11 – Evans (14)	4 – Jackson (11)	Breslin Center (14,797); East Lansing, MI
03/10/2013; 11:00 am, BTN	No. 22	at Penn State	W 63–60	21–10 (12–6)	15 – Jackson (2)	10 – Berggren (10)	4 – Brust (13), Jackson (12)	Bryce Jordan Center (8,701); University Park, PA
Big Ten tournament
03/15/2013; 1:35 pm, ESPN	(4) No. 22	vs. (5) No. 6 Michigan; Quarterfinal	W 68–59	22–10	16 – Jackson (3)	8 – Brust (6), Bruesewitz (5)	6 – Evans (9)	United Center (21,793); Chicago, IL
03/16/2013; 12:40 pm, CBS	(4) No. 22	vs. (1) No. 3 Indiana; Semifinal	W 68–56	23–10	16 – Evans (7)	8 – Evans (15)	4 – Jackson (13), Evans (10)	United Center (21,824); Chicago, IL
03/17/2013; 2:30 pm, CBS	(4) No. 22	vs. (2) No. 10 Ohio State; Championship	L 43–50	23–11	10 – Jackson (4)	6 – Bruesewitz (6)	3 – Kaminsky (1)	United Center (20,560); Chicago, IL
NCAA tournament
03/22/2013; 11:40 am, truTV	(5 W) No. 18	vs. (12 W) Ole Miss; First round	L 46–57	23–12	14 – Dekker (6)	9 – Berggren (11)	4 – Jackson (14)	Sprint Center (18,301); Kansas City, MO
*Non-conference game. ^{#}Rankings from AP Poll. (#) Tournament seedings in parentheses. All times are in Central Time. (#) during NCAA Tournament is Seed with Region W=West.

== Rankings ==
Regular season polls
Poll	Pre- Season	Week 1	Week 2	Week 3	Week 4	Week 5	Week 6	Week 7	Week 8	Week 9	Week 10	Week 11	Week 12	Week 13	Week 14	Week 15	Week 16	Week 17	Week 18	Final
AP	23	22	RV	RV	NR	NR	NR	NR	NR	NR	RV	RV	RV	RV	20	19	17	22	22	18
Coaches	21	20	24	RV	NR	NR	NR	NR	NR	NR	RV	RV	RV	RV	19	17	16	21	23	17

Legend
	Increase in ranking
	Decrease in ranking
	No change
(RV)	Received votes
T	Tied

== Player statistics ==
- As of March 23, 2013

		        MINUTES    |--TOTAL--|   |--3-PTS--| |-F-THROWS-| |---REBOUNDS---|                 |-SCORING-| 
## Player           GP GS Tot  Avg  FG  FGA  Pct  3FG 3FA Pct FT FTA  Pct  Off Def Tot Avg PF FO  A TO Blk Stl Pts Avg 
01 Brust, Ben       35 35 1200 34.3 140 330 .424  79 203 .389  29  43 .674  41 139 180 5.1 47  1  79  40  2 34 388 11.1
40 Berggren, Jared  35 35  999 28.5 145 308 .471  21  83 .253  73 104 .702  88 154 242 6.9 53  0  30  36 73 20 384 11.0
05 Evans, Ryan      35 35 1017 29.1 144 365 .395   2  24 .083  63 148 .426  71 186 257 7.3 64  1  70  55 28 26 353 10.1
15 Dekker, Sam      35  3  780 22.3 118 247 .478  50 128 .391  49  71 .690  43  75 118 3.4 43  0  47  37 14 23 335  9.6
12 Jackson, Traevon 35 29  973 27.8  84 226 .372  22  75 .293  52  68 .765  16  72  88 2.5 75  1  99  73  6 35 242  6.9
31 Bruesewitz, Mike 33 30  923 28.0  71 177 .401  30 106 .283  38  55 .691  52 123 175 5.3 84  4  60  48  9 29 210  6.4
44 Kaminsky, Frank  32  2  329 10.3  43  98 .439  14  45 .311  33  43 .767  21  35  56 1.8 40  0  26   9 17 14 133  4.2
03 Marshall, George 35  6  552 15.8  49 138 .355  35  95 .368  10  16 .625   3  22  25 0.7 47  0  35  18  0  7 143  4.1
33 Showalter, Zak   22  0  147  6.7  11  29 .379   2  10 .200  13  19 .684  13  10  23 1.0 18  0  12   8  1  7  37  1.7
10 Fahey, Dan       10  0   28  2.8   3   6 .500   0   1 .000   5   6 .833   2   4   6 0.6  0  0   2   2  1  1  11  1.1
34 Bohannon, Zach   17  0   80  4.7   7  15 .467   2   5 .400   1   6 .167   9  14  23 1.4  6  0   2   3  2  2  17  1.0
32 Anderson, Evan   12  0   38  3.2   4   7 .571   0   1 .000   1   1 1.000  0   2   2 0.2 10  0   2   3  0  1   9  0.8
02 Smith, Jordan    10  0   21  2.1   3  10 .300   1   7 .143   0   0 .000   2   2   4 0.4  2  0   1   0  0  0   7  0.7
22 Wise, J.D.        9  0   13  1.4   1   3 .333   1   1 1.000  2   2 1.000  0   3   3 0.3  2  0   0   2  0  1   5  0.6
   Team                                                                    45  40  85       0      8 
   Total..........  35  7100  823 1959 .420 259 784 .330 369 582 .634 406 881 1287 36.8 491  7 465  342 153 200 2274 65.0
   Opponents......  35  7100  744 1890 .394 136 470 .289 334 485 .689 325 838 1168 33.2 605 15 300  392  85 198 1958 55.9
