= 2012–13 Baylor Bears basketball team =

American college basketball season

2012–13 Baylor Bears men's basketball

NIT champions
- Conference: Big 12 Conference
- Record: 23–14 (9–9 Big 12)
- Head coach: Scott Drew (10th season)
- Assistant coaches: Jerome Tang; Grant McCasland; Paul Mills
- Home arena: Ferrell Center

2012–13 Big 12 men's basketball standings
	Conf.				Overall
Team	W		L	PCT	W		L	PCT
No. 3 Kansas †	14	–	4	.778	31	–	6	.838
No. 12 Kansas State	14	–	4	.778	27	–	8	.771
No. 17 Oklahoma State	13	–	5	.722	24	–	9	.727
Oklahoma	11	–	7	.611	20	–	12	.625
Iowa State	11	–	7	.611	23	–	12	.657
Baylor	9	–	9	.500	23	–	14	.622
Texas	7	–	11	.389	16	–	18	.471
West Virginia	6	–	12	.333	13	–	19	.406
Texas Tech	3	–	15	.167	11	–	20	.355
TCU	2	–	16	.111	11	–	21	.344
† 2013 Big 12 Tournament winner Rankings from AP poll

The 2012–13 Baylor Bears men's basketball team represented Baylor University in the 2012–13 NCAA Division I men's basketball season. This was head coach Scott Drew's tenth season at Baylor. The Bears competed in the Big 12 Conference and played their home games at the Ferrell Center. They finished the season 23–14, 9–9 in Big 12 play to finish in sixth place. They lost in the quarterfinals of the Big 12 tournament to Oklahoma State. They were invited to the 2013 NIT, where they defeated Long Beach State, Arizona State, Providence, BYU, and Iowa en route to becoming the 2013 NIT champions.

== Pre-season ==
=== Departures ===
Name	Number	Pos.	Height	Weight	Year	Hometown	Notes
Perry Jones III	1	F	6'11"	235	Sophomore	Duncanville, Texas	Entered 2012 NBA draft; Selected 1st Round, pick #28 by Oklahoma City Thunder
Fred Ellis	3	G	6'6"	220	Senior	Sacramento, California	Graduated
Quincy Acy	4	F	6'7"	225	Senior	Mesquite, Texas	Graduated; Entered 2012 NBA draft; Selected 2nd Round, pick #37 by Toronto Raptors
Quincy Miller	30	F	6'9"	210	Freshman	Chicago, Illinois	Entered 2012 NBA draft; Selected 2nd Round, pick #38 by Denver Nuggets
Anthony Jones	41	F	6'10"	190	Senior	Houston, TX	Graduated

=== Recruits ===
College recruiting
Name	Hometown	School	Height	Weight	Commit date
Isaiah Austin; C	Arlington, TX	Grace Preparatory Academy	7 ft 0 in (2.13 m)	215 lb (98 kg)	Aug 9, 2010
Isaiah Austin; C	Recruit ratings: Scout: Rivals: (97)				
Rico Gathers; PF	Reserve, LA	Riverside Academy	6 ft 6 in (1.98 m)	235 lb (107 kg)	Feb 6, 2010
Rico Gathers; PF	Recruit ratings: Scout: Rivals: (96)				
L. J. Rose; PG	Houston, TX	Westbury Christian	6 ft 4 in (1.93 m)	185 lb (84 kg)	Sep 3, 2011
L. J. Rose; PG	Recruit ratings: Scout: Rivals: (94)				
Chad Rykhoek; C	Fort Worth, TX	Fort Worth Christian	6 ft 11 in (2.11 m)	220 lb (100 kg)	Sep 20, 2011
Chad Rykhoek; C	Recruit ratings: Scout: Rivals: (91)				
Taurean Waller-Prince; PF	San Antonio, TX	Warren	6 ft 7 in (2.01 m)	210 lb (95 kg)	May 14, 2012
Taurean Waller-Prince; PF	Recruit ratings: Scout: Rivals: (89)				
Overall recruit ranking: Scout: 4 Rivals: 5 ESPN: 5
Note: In many cases, Scout, Rivals, 247Sports, On3, and ESPN may conflict in their listings of height and weight.; In these cases, the average was taken. ESPN grades are on a 100-point scale.; Sources: "Baylor 2012 Basketball Commitments". Rivals.; "2012 Baylor Basketball Commits". Scout.; "ESPN". ESPN.; "Scout.com Team Recruiting Rankings". Scout.; "2012 Team Ranking". Rivals.

== Roster ==
2012–13 Baylor Bears men's basketball team
Players
Coaches

Pos.	#	Name	Height	Weight	Year	Previous school	Hometown
G	1	L. J. Rose	6 ft 4 in (1.93 m)	185 lb (84 kg)	Fr	Westbury	Houston, TX
F	2	Rico Gathers	6 ft 8 in (2.03 m)	240 lb (109 kg)	Fr	Riverside Academy	LaPlace, LA
G	4	Gary Franklin	6 ft 2 in (1.88 m)	195 lb (88 kg)	RS Jr	Mater Dei; California	Santa Ana, CA
G	5	Brady Heslip	6 ft 2 in (1.88 m)	180 lb (82 kg)	RS Jr	New Hampton Prep; Boston College	Burlington, ON
G	10	Allex Austin	6 ft 6 in (1.98 m)	200 lb (91 kg)	Fr	San Marcos	San Marcos, TX
F/C	11	J'mison Morgan	6 ft 11 in (2.11 m)	250 lb (113 kg)	RS Sr	South Oak Cliff; UCLA	Dallas, TX
G	14	Deuce Bello	6 ft 4 in (1.93 m)	185 lb (84 kg)	So	Westchester Country Day School	Greensboro, NC
F/C	15	Chad Rykhoek	6 ft 11 in (2.11 m)	220 lb (100 kg)	Fr	Ft. Worth Christian	Ft. Worth, TX
F	20	Logan Lowery	6 ft 6 in (1.98 m)	185 lb (84 kg)	RS So	Kingwood; Centenary	Kingwood, TX
C	21	Isaiah Austin	7 ft 0 in (2.13 m)	215 lb (98 kg)	Fr	Grace Prep	Arlington, TX
G	22	A. J. Walton	6 ft 1 in (1.85 m)	185 lb (84 kg)	Sr	Hall	Little Rock, AR
F	23	Jacob Neubert	6 ft 5 in (1.96 m)	200 lb (91 kg)	Sr	Midway	Waco, TX
F	34	Cory Jefferson	6 ft 9 in (2.06 m)	210 lb (95 kg)	Jr	Killeen	Killeen, TX
F	35	Taurean Prince	6 ft 7 in (2.01 m)	210 lb (95 kg)	Fr	Earl Warren	San Antonio, TX
G	55	Pierre Jackson	5 ft 10 in (1.78 m)	180 lb (82 kg)	Sr	Desert Pines; College of Southern Idaho	Las Vegas, NV

Head coach

- Scott Drew (Butler)

Assistant coach(es)

- Jerome Tang (Charter Oak State)
- Grant McCasland (Baylor)
- Paul Mills (Texas A&M)

Legend

- (C) Team captain
- (S) Suspended
- (I) Ineligible
- (W) Walk-on
- Injured
- Current redshirt

== Rankings ==
Ranking movements Legend: ██ Increase in ranking ██ Decrease in ranking RV = Received votes
	Week																				
Poll	Pre	1	2	3	4	5	6	7	8	9	10	11	12	13	14	15	16	17	18	19	Final
AP Poll	19	19	16	24	RV																
Coaches Poll	18	18	17	21	RV																

== Schedule and results ==
- All times are Central

Date time, TV	Rank^{#}	Opponent^{#}	Result	Record	Site (attendance) city, state
Exhibition
10/25/2012*; 7:00 pm	No. 19	Abilene Christian	W 103–75		Ferrell Center (6,568); Waco, TX
Regular Season
11/09/2012*; 4:00 pm, FSSW	No. 19	Lehigh	W 99–77	1–0	Ferrell Center (6,568); Waco, TX
11/11/2012*; 4:00 pm, FSSW	No. 19	Jackson State	W 78–47	2–0	Ferrell Center (5,846); Waco, TX
11/15/2012*; 2:00 pm, ESPNU	No. 16	vs. Boston College; Charleston Classic Quarterfinals	W 84–74	3–0	TD Arena (2,686); Charleston, SC
11/16/2012*; 11:30 am, ESPNU	No. 16	vs. Colorado; Charleston Classic semifinals	L 58–60	3–1	TD Arena (3,177); Charleston, SC
11/18/2012*; 4:30 pm, ESPNU	No. 16	vs. St. John's; Charleston Classic 3rd place game	W 97–78	4–1	TD Arena (3,291); Charleston, SC
11/24/2012*; 8:00 pm, ESPN3	No. 24	College of Charleston; Charleston Classic	L 59–63	4–2	Ferrell Center (5,768); Waco, TX
12/01/2012*; 11:30 am, CBS		at No. 8 Kentucky	W 64–55	5–2	Rupp Arena (24,192); Lexington, KY
12/04/2012*; 8:00 pm, ESPN2		Northwestern	L 70–74	5–3	Ferrell Center (6,532); Waco, TX
12/12/2012*; 8:30 pm, FSSW+		Lamar	W 85–68	6–3	Ferrell Center (5,688); Waco, TX
12/17/2012*; 7:00 pm, FSSW		USC Upstate	W 73–57	7–3	Ferrell Center (6,639); Waco, TX
12/21/2012*; 8:00 pm, ESPN2		BYU	W 79–64	8–3	Ferrell Center (7,239); Waco, TX
12/28/2012*; 7:00 pm, ESPN2		at No. 13 Gonzaga	L 87–94	8–4	McCarthey Athletic Center (6,000); Spokane, WA
01/05/2013; 1:00 pm, ESPNU		Texas	W 86–79 ^{OT}	9–4 (1–0)	Ferrell Center (7,749); Waco, TX
01/08/2013; 6:00 pm, ESPN2		at Texas Tech	W 82–48	10–4 (2–0)	United Spirit Arena (6,385); Lubbock, TX
01/12/2013; 5:00 pm, FSSW		TCU	W 51–40	11–4 (3–0)	Ferrell Center (7,753); Waco, TX
01/14/2013; 8:00 pm, ESPN		at No. 4 Kansas	L 44–61	11–5 (3–1)	Allen Fieldhouse (16,300); Lawrence, KS
01/19/2013*; 2:00 pm, FSSW		Hardin-Simmons	W 107–38	12–5	Ferrell Center (6,647); Waco, TX
01/21/2013; 4:30 pm, ESPN		Oklahoma State	W 64–54	13–5 (4–1)	Ferrell Center (8,039); Waco, TX
01/26/2013; 3:00 pm, Big 12 Network		at TCU	W 82–56	14–5 (5–1)	Daniel-Meyer Coliseum (6,277); Fort Worth, TX
01/30/2013; 6:00 pm, ESPNU		Oklahoma	L 71–74	14–6 (5–2)	Ferrell Center (6,533); Waco, TX
02/02/2013; 7:00 pm, ESPN2		at Iowa State	L 71–79	14–7 (5–3)	Hilton Coliseum (14,376); Ames, IA
02/06/2013; 6:00 pm, ESPN		at No. 22 Oklahoma State	L 67–69 ^{OT}	14–8 (5–4)	Gallagher-Iba Arena (7,547); Stillwater, OK
02/09/2013; 3:00 pm, Big 12 Network		Texas Tech	W 75–48	15–8 (6–4)	Ferrell Center (7,750); Waco, TX
02/13/2013; 8:00 pm, ESPN2		West Virginia	W 80–60	16–8 (7–4)	Ferrell Center (6,573); Waco, TX
02/16/2013; 6:00 pm, ESPNU		at No. 10 Kansas State	L 61–81	16–9 (7–5)	Bramlage Coliseum (12,528); Manhattan, KS
02/20/2013; 8:00 pm, ESPNU		Iowa State	L 82–87	16–10 (7–6)	Ferrell Center (6,293); Waco, TX
02/23/2013; 4:00 pm, ESPNU		at Oklahoma	L 76–90	16–11 (7–7)	Lloyd Noble Center (12,199); Norman, OK
02/27/2013; 7:00 pm, Big 12 Network		at West Virginia	W 65–62	17–11 (8–7)	WVU Coliseum (6,588); Morgantown, WV
03/02/2013; 6:00 pm, ESPN2		No. 13 Kansas State	L 61–64	17–12 (8–8)	Ferrell Center (9,656); Waco, TX
03/04/2013; 8:00 pm, ESPN		at Texas	L 70–79	17–13 (8–9)	Frank Erwin Center (10,351); Austin, TX
03/09/2013; 5:00 pm, ESPN		No. 4 Kansas	W 81–58	18–13 (9–9)	Ferrell Center (9,695); Waco, TX
Big 12 tournament
03/14/2013; 8:30 pm, Big 12 Network/ESPN3	(6)	vs. (3) No. 14 Oklahoma State; Quarterfinals	L 72–74	18–14	Sprint Center (17,257); Kansas City, MO
NIT
03/20/2013*; 8:00 pm, ESPN2	(2)	(7) Long Beach State; First Round	W 112–66	19–14	Ferrell Center (4,034); Waco, TX
03/22/2013*; 7:00 pm, ESPN2	(2)	(3) Arizona State; Second Round	W 89–86	20–14	Ferrell Center (4,562); Waco, TX
03/27/2013*; 8:00 pm, ESPN2	(2)	(4) Providence; Quarterfinals	W 79–68	21–14	Ferrell Center (4,544); Waco, TX
04/02/2013*; 6:00 pm, ESPN2	(2)	vs. (3) BYU; Semifinals	W 76–70	22–14	Madison Square Garden (10,009); New York, NY
04/04/2013*; 8:00 pm, ESPN	(2)	vs. (3) Iowa; Championship	W 74–54	23–14	Madison Square Garden (5,301); New York, NY
*Non-conference game. ^{#}Rankings from AP Poll. (#) Tournament seedings in parentheses. All times are in Central Time. (#) during NIT is Seed within Region.
