= 2012–13 Nebraska Cornhuskers men's basketball team =

American college basketball season

2012–13 Nebraska Cornhuskers men's basketball
- Conference: Big Ten Conference
- Record: 15–18 (5–13 Big Ten)
- Head coach: Tim Miles (1st Season)
- Assistant coaches: Chris Harriman; Ben Johnson; Craig Smith
- Home arena: Bob Devaney Sports Center

2012–13 Big Ten Conference men's basketball standings
	Conf.				Overall
Team	W		L	PCT	W		L	PCT
No. 4 Indiana	14	–	4	.778	29	–	7	.806
No. 7 Ohio State †	13	–	5	.722	29	–	8	.784
No. 9 Michigan State	13	–	5	.722	27	–	9	.750
No. 10 Michigan	12	–	6	.667	31	–	8	.795
No. 18 Wisconsin	12	–	6	.667	23	–	12	.657
Iowa	9	–	9	.500	25	–	13	.658
Illinois	8	–	10	.444	23	–	13	.639
Minnesota	8	–	10	.444	21	–	13	.618
Purdue	8	–	10	.444	16	–	18	.471
Nebraska	5	–	13	.278	15	–	18	.455
Northwestern	4	–	14	.222	13	–	19	.406
Penn State	2	–	16	.111	10	–	21	.323
† 2013 Big Ten tournament winner Rankings from AP Poll

The 2012–13 Nebraska Cornhuskers men's basketball team represented the University of Nebraska–Lincoln. Led by head coach Tim Miles, in his first season with the Cornhuskers. The team will play its home games in Bob Devaney Sports Center in Lincoln, Nebraska, and were a member of the Big Ten Conference. This was their final season at the Bob Devaney Sports Center before moving into their new arena, Pinnacle Bank Arena, for the 2013-14 season.

== Incoming Recruits ==
College recruiting
Name	Hometown	School	Height	Weight	Commit date
Shavon Shields; SF	Olathe, KS	Olathe Northwest High School	6 ft 6 in (1.98 m)	210 lb (95 kg)	Sep 5, 2011
Shavon Shields; SF	Recruit ratings: Scout: Rivals: (82)				
Benny Parker; PG	Kansas City, KS	Sumner Academy	5 ft 9 in (1.75 m)	165 lb (75 kg)	Sep 20, 2011
Benny Parker; PG	Recruit ratings: Scout: Rivals: (74)				
Deverell Biggs; PG	Omaha, NE	Omaha Central	6 ft 0 in (1.83 m)	200 lb (91 kg)	Apr 15, 2012
Deverell Biggs; PG	Recruit ratings: Scout: Rivals: (N/A)				
Sergej Vucetic; C	Vrbas, Serbia	AIM Prep	7 ft 0 in (2.13 m)	235 lb (107 kg)	May 3, 2012
Sergej Vucetic; C	Recruit ratings: Scout: Rivals: (N/A)				
Overall recruit ranking:
Note: In many cases, Scout, Rivals, 247Sports, On3, and ESPN may conflict in their listings of height and weight.; In these cases, the average was taken. ESPN grades are on a 100-point scale.; Sources: "2012 Team Ranking". Rivals.

== Roster ==
2012–13 Nebraska Cornhuskers men's basketball team
Players
Coaches
}

Pos.	#	Name	Height	Weight	Year	Hometown
G	1	Deverell Biggs	6 ft 7 in (2.01 m)	170 lb (77 kg)	Fr	Omaha, NE
G	2	David Rivers	6 ft 7 in (2.01 m)	174 lb (79 kg)	So	Little Rock, AR
G	3	Benny Parker	5 ft 9 in (1.75 m)	169 lb (77 kg)	Fr	Kansas City, KS
G	4	Max Richtie	6 ft 4 in (1.93 m)	168 lb (76 kg)	Fr	Nebraska City, NE
F	5	Terran Petteway (redshirt)	6 ft 6 in (1.98 m)	195 lb (88 kg)	So	Galveston, TX
G	10	Trevor Meke	5 ft 11 in (1.8 m)	172 lb (78 kg)	RS So	Beatrice, NE
F	11	Jordan Tyrance	6 ft 3 in (1.91 m)	195 lb (88 kg)	RS So	Lincoln, NE
F	11	Mike Peltz	6 ft 2 in (1.88 m)	199 lb (90 kg)	Jr	Alliance, NE
F	13	Brandon Ubel	6 ft 10 in (2.08 m)	235 lb (107 kg)	Sr	Overland Park, KS
C	14	Sergej Vucetic	7 ft 0 in (2.13 m)	236 lb (107 kg)	Fr	Vrbas, SER
G	15	Ray Gallegos	6 ft 2 in (1.88 m)	176 lb (80 kg)	RS Jr	Salt Lake City, UT
G	24	Dylan Talley	6 ft 5 in (1.96 m)	214 lb (97 kg)	Sr	Camden, NJ
G	31	Shavon Shields	6 ft 6 in (1.98 m)	212 lb (96 kg)	Fr	Olathe, KS
C	32	Andre Almeida	6 ft 11 in (2.11 m)	310 lb (141 kg)	RS Sr	São Paulo, BRA
F	35	Walter Pitchford	6 ft 10 in (2.08 m)	231 lb (105 kg)	So	Grand Rapids, MI
C	44	Kye Kurkowski	6 ft 10 in (2.08 m)	212 lb (96 kg)	RS So	Grant, NE

Head coach

- Tim Miles (Mary)

Assistant coach(es)

- Chris Harriman (Augusta State)
- Ben Johnson (Minnesota)
- Craig Smith (North Dakota)

Legend

- (C) Team captain
- (S) Suspended
- (I) Ineligible
- (W) Walk-on
- Injured
- Current redshirt

Roster
Last update: September 2, 2012

== Schedule ==
Date time, TV	Rank^{#}	Opponent^{#}	Result	Record	Site (attendance) city, state
Exhibition
11/07/2012*; 7:00 pm		Midland	W 68–40	–	Bob Devaney Sports Center (9,480); Lincoln, NE
Regular season
11/11/2012*; 6:00 pm		Southern	W 66–55	1–0	Bob Devaney Sports Center (9,214); Lincoln, NE
11/15/2012*; 8:00 pm, BTN		Valparaiso; Joe Cipriano Nebraska Classic	W 50–48	2–0	Bob Devaney Sports Center (6,324); Lincoln, NE
11/18/2012*; 2:00 pm		Nebraska–Omaha; Joe Cipriano Nebraska Classic	W 75–62	3–0	Bob Devaney Sports Center (6,961); Lincoln, NE
11/21/2012*; 7:00 pm		Tulane; Joe Cipriano Nebraska Classic	W 61–57	4–0	Bob Devaney Sports Center (9,133); Lincoln, NE
11/24/2012*; 8:00 pm, BTN		Kent State; Joe Cipriano Nebraska Classic	L 60–74	4–1	Bob Devaney Sports Center (5,947); Lincoln, NE
11/27/2012*; 8:15 pm, ESPNU		at Wake Forest; ACC–Big Ten Challenge	W 79–63	5–1	LJMV Coliseum (6,508); Winston-Salem, NC
12/03/2012*; 7:00 pm, BTN		USC	W 63–51	6–1	Bob Devaney Sports Center (10,045); Lincoln, NE
12/06/2012*; 7:00 pm, ESPN3		No. 16 Creighton; Rivalry	L 42–64	6–2	Bob Devaney Sports Center (13,368); Lincoln, NE
12/15/2012*; 3:30 pm, FSN		at Oregon	L 38–60	6–3	Matthew Knight Arena (6,102); Eugene, OR
12/18/2012*; 8:00 pm, BTN		Jacksonville State	W 59–55	7–3	Bob Devaney Sports Center (7,979); Lincoln, NE
12/22/2012*; 6:00 pm		vs. Central Michigan; Sun Bowl Invitational semifinals	W 89–75	8–3	Don Haskins Center (7,132); El Paso, TX
12/23/2012*; 8:00 pm		at UTEP; Sun Bowl Invitational championship	L 52–68	8–4	Don Haskins Center (7,532); El Paso, TX
12/29/2012*; 2:00 pm		Nicholls State	W 68–59	9–4	Bob Devaney Sports Center (11,011); Lincoln, NE
01/02/2013; 5:30 pm, BTN		at No. 8 Ohio State	L 44–70	9–5 (0–1)	Value City Arena (15,900); Columbus, OH
01/06/2013; 3:30 pm, BTN		Wisconsin	L 41–47	9–6 (0–2)	Bob Devaney Sports Center (9,805); Lincoln, NE
01/09/2013; 6:00 pm, BTN		at No. 2 Michigan	L 47–62	9–7 (0–3)	Crisler Center (12,693); Ann Arbor, MI
01/13/2013; 5:00 pm, BTN		at No. 22 Michigan State	L 56–66	9–8 (0–4)	Breslin Center (14,797); East Lansing, MI
01/16/2013; 8:00 pm, BTN		Purdue	L 56–65	9–9 (0–5)	Bob Devaney Sports Center (9,271); Lincoln, NE
01/19/2013; 12:00 pm, ESPNU		at Penn State	W 68–64	10–9 (1–5)	Bryce Jordan Center (9,883); University Park, PA
01/22/2013; 7:30 pm, BTN		Illinois	L 51–71	10–10 (1–6)	Bob Devaney Sports Center (9,556); Lincoln, NE
01/26/2013; 2:00 pm, ESPNU		Northwestern	W 64–49	11–10 (2–6)	Bob Devaney Sports Center (10,216); Lincoln, NE
01/29/2013; 8:00 pm, BTN		at No. 23 Minnesota	L 65–84	11–11 (2–7)	Williams Arena (12,672); Minneapolis, MN
02/02/2013; 6:00 pm, BTN		No. 11 Ohio State	L 56–63	11–12 (2–8)	Bob Devaney Sports Center (11,478); Lincoln, NE
02/09/2013; 8:00 pm, ESPNU		Penn State	W 67–53	12–12 (3–8)	Bob Devaney Sports Center (10,853); Lincoln, NE
02/13/2013; 6:00 pm, BTN		at No. 1 Indiana	L 47–76	12–13 (3–9)	Assembly Hall (17,472); Bloomington, IN
02/16/2013; 7:00 pm, BTN		No. 8 Michigan State	L 64–73	12–14 (3–10)	Bob Devaney Sports Center (12,202); Lincoln, NE
02/23/2013; 1:00 pm		Iowa	W 64–60	13–14 (4–10)	Bob Devaney Sports Center (12,334); Lincoln, NE
02/26/2013; 8:00 pm, BTN		at No. 17 Wisconsin	L 46–77	13–15 (4–11)	Kohl Center (17,026); Madison, WI
03/02/2013; 4:15 pm, BTN		at Illinois	L 65–72	13–16 (4–12)	Assembly Hall (16,618); Champaign, IL
03/06/2013; 8:00 pm, BTN		Minnesota	W 53–51	14–16 (5–12)	Bob Devaney Sports Center (13,194); Lincoln, NE
03/09/2013; 1:21 pm, BTN		at Iowa	L 60–74	14–17 (5–13)	Carver-Hawkeye Arena (15,400); Iowa City, IA
Big Ten tournament
03/14/2013; 5:30 pm, ESPN2		vs. Purdue; First Round	W 57–55	15–17	United Center (19,667); Chicago, IL
03/15/2013; 5:30 pm, BTN		vs. No. 10 Ohio State; Quarterfinals	L 50–71	15–18	United Center (21,229); Chicago, IL
*Non-conference game. ^{#}Rankings from Coaches' Poll. (#) Tournament seedings in parentheses. All times are in Central Time.
