= 2012–13 Ohio State Buckeyes men's basketball team =

American college basketball season

2012–13 Ohio State Buckeyes men's basketball

Big Ten tournament champion Hall of Fame Tip Off champion

NCAA tournament, Elite Eight
- Conference: Big Ten Conference

Ranking
- Coaches: No. 6
- AP: No. 7
- Record: 29–8 (13–5 Big Ten)
- Head coach: Thad Matta
- Assistant coaches: Dave Dickerson; Jeff Boals; Chris Jent
- Home arena: Value City Arena

2012–13 Big Ten Conference men's basketball standings
	Conf.				Overall
Team	W		L	PCT	W		L	PCT
No. 4 Indiana	14	–	4	.778	29	–	7	.806
No. 7 Ohio State †	13	–	5	.722	29	–	8	.784
No. 9 Michigan State	13	–	5	.722	27	–	9	.750
No. 10 Michigan	12	–	6	.667	31	–	8	.795
No. 18 Wisconsin	12	–	6	.667	23	–	12	.657
Iowa	9	–	9	.500	25	–	13	.658
Illinois	8	–	10	.444	23	–	13	.639
Minnesota	8	–	10	.444	21	–	13	.618
Purdue	8	–	10	.444	16	–	18	.471
Nebraska	5	–	13	.278	15	–	18	.455
Northwestern	4	–	14	.222	13	–	19	.406
Penn State	2	–	16	.111	10	–	21	.323
† 2013 Big Ten tournament winner Rankings from AP Poll

The 2012–13 Ohio State Buckeyes men's basketball team represented Ohio State University in the 2012–13 NCAA Division I men's basketball season. Their head coach was Thad Matta, in his ninth season with the Buckeyes. The team played its home games at Value City Arena in Columbus, Ohio. They finished with a record of 29–8 overall, 13–5 in Big Ten play for a second place tie with Michigan State. They won the 2013 Big Ten Conference men's basketball tournament and received an automatic bid in the 2013 NCAA Division I men's basketball tournament, where they were defeated by Wichita State in the Elite Eight.

== Before the season ==
=== Previous season ===
The Ohio State Buckeyes began the 2011–12 season ranked #3 in the nation and would go on to an 8–0 start to the season, with their first loss coming at Allen Fieldhouse against the Kansas Jayhawks. Ohio State remained in the top three through the first two months of the season, until they lost their first conference game of the season on December 31 against the Indiana Hoosiers. Ohio State went 13–5 through Big Ten play and ended the season with a 25–6 record and won a share of the Big Ten regular season championship, sharing it with Michigan State and Michigan. Ohio State would end up losing in the championship game of the Big Ten tournament and enter the NCAA tournament as a #2 seed. Ohio State would go on to defeat Syracuse in the Elite Eight en route to the program's eleventh Final Four appearance. Ohio State lost to the Kansas Jayhawks in the Final Four and ended the season with a 31–8 record and #3 ranking. After the season, Jared Sullinger declared for the NBA draft after his sophomore season, while Deshaun Thomas decided to return for his junior season.

=== Departures ===
Name	Position	Reason
William Buford	Guard	Graduation
Jordan Sibert	Guard	Transfer to Dayton
Jared Sullinger	Forward	Entered NBA draft
J.D. Weatherspoon	Forward	Transfer to Toledo

=== Recruiting ===
College recruiting information
Name	Hometown	School	Height	Weight	Commit date
Amedeo Della Valle; PG	Henderson, Nevada	Findlay Prep	6 ft 3 in (1.91 m)	180 lb (82 kg)	Apr 21, 2012
Amedeo Della Valle; PG	Recruit ratings: Scout: Rivals: (89)				
Overall recruit ranking: Scout: NR Rivals: NR ESPN: NR
Note: In many cases, Scout, Rivals, 247Sports, On3, and ESPN may conflict in their listings of height and weight.; In these cases, the average was taken. ESPN grades are on a 100-point scale.; Sources: "Ohio State 2012 Basketball Commitments". Rivals.; "Ohio State Buckeyes 2012 Player Commits". ESPN.; "2012 Team Ranking". Rivals.

== Roster ==
2012–13 Ohio State Buckeyes men's basketball team
Players
Coaches

Pos.	#	Name	Height	Weight	Year	Hometown
F	1	Deshaun Thomas	6 ft 7 in (2.01 m)	215 lb (98 kg)	Jr	Fort Wayne, Indiana
G	3	Shannon Scott	6 ft 3 in (1.91 m)	185 lb (84 kg)	So	Alpharetta, Georgia
G	4	Aaron Craft	6 ft 2 in (1.88 m)	195 lb (88 kg)	Jr	Findlay, Ohio
F	10	LaQuinton Ross	6 ft 8 in (2.03 m)	215 lb (98 kg)	So	Jackson, Mississippi
F	12	Sam Thompson	6 ft 7 in (2.01 m)	200 lb (91 kg)	So	Chicago, Illinois
G	14	Alex Rogers	6 ft 2 in (1.88 m)	200 lb (91 kg)	Sr	Cincinnati, Ohio
C	23	Amir Williams	6 ft 11 in (2.11 m)	250 lb (113 kg)	So	Birmingham, Michigan
F	30	Evan Ravenel	6 ft 8 in (2.03 m)	250 lb (113 kg)	Sr	Tampa, Florida
G	32	Lenzelle Smith Jr.	6 ft 4 in (1.93 m)	210 lb (95 kg)	Jr	Zion, Illinois
G	33	Amedeo Della Valle	6 ft 5 in (1.96 m)	190 lb (86 kg)	Fr	Alba, Italy
F	34	Jake Lorbach	6 ft 7 in (2.01 m)	210 lb (95 kg)	Fr	Elyria, Ohio
C	55	Trey McDonald	6 ft 8 in (2.03 m)	240 lb (109 kg)	So	Battle Creek, Michigan

Head coach

- Thad Matta

Assistant coach(es)

- Dave Dickerson
- Jeff Boals
- Chris Jent

Legend

- (C) Team captain
- (S) Suspended
- (I) Ineligible
- (W) Walk-on
- Injured
- Current redshirt

Roster
Last update: 2012-11-06

== Schedule ==
Date time, TV	Rank^{#}	Opponent^{#}	Result	Record	Site (attendance) city, state
Exhibition
October 30*; 7:00 pm	No. 4	Walsh	W 83–71	–	Value City Arena (13,474); Columbus, OH
Regular season
November 11*; 2:00 pm	No. 4	Albany; Hall of Fame Tip Off	W 82–60	1–0	Value City Arena (13,497); Columbus, OH
November 17*; 5:00 pm, ESPN3	No. 4	vs. Rhode Island; Hall of Fame Tip Off Semifinal	W 69–58	2–0	Mohegan Sun Arena (N/A); Uncasville, CT
November 18*; 4:30 pm, ESPN2	No. 4	vs. Washington; Hall of Fame Tip Off Championship	W 77–66	3–0	Mohegan Sun Arena (N/A); Uncasville, CT
November 23*; 6:00 pm, BTN	No. 3	UMKC	W 91–45	4–0	Value City Arena (17,478); Columbus, OH
November 28*; 9:30 pm, ESPN	No. 3	at No. 2 Duke; ACC–Big Ten Challenge	L 68–73	4–1	Cameron Indoor Stadium (9,314); Durham, NC
December 1*; 4:30 pm, BTN	No. 3	Northern Kentucky	W 70–43	5–1	Value City Arena (16,548); Columbus, OH
December 8*; 12:00 pm, BTN	No. 7	Long Beach State	W 89–55	6–1	Value City Arena (14,832); Columbus, OH
December 12*; 7:00 pm, BTN	No. 7	Savannah State	W 85–45	7–1	Value City Arena (13,848); Columbus, OH
December 15*; 12:00 pm, BTN	No. 7	UNC Asheville	W 90–72	8–1	Value City Arena (15,041); Columbus, OH
December 18*; 7:00 pm, BTN	No. 7	Winthrop	W 65–55	9–1	Value City Arena (13,707); Columbus, OH
December 22*; 4:00 pm, CBS	No. 7	No. 9 Kansas	L 66–74	9–2	Value City Arena (19,049); Columbus, OH
December 29*; 4:30 pm, BTN	No. 10	Chicago State	W 87–44	10–2	Value City Arena (16,881); Columbus, OH
January 2; 6:30 pm, BTN	No. 8	Nebraska	W 70–44	11–2 (1–0)	Value City Arena (15,900); Columbus, OH
January 5; 2:15 pm, BTN	No. 8	at No. 11 Illinois	L 55–74	11–3 (1–1)	Assembly Hall (16,618); Champaign, IL
January 8; 9:00 pm, ESPN	No. 15	at Purdue	W 74–64	12–3 (2–1)	Mackey Arena (14,642); West Lafayette, IN
January 13; 1:30 pm, CBS	No. 15	No. 2 Michigan	W 56–53	13–3 (3–1)	Value City Arena (18,809); Columbus, OH
January 19; 6:00 pm, ESPN	No. 11	at No. 18 Michigan State	L 56–59	13–4 (3–2)	Breslin Center (14,797); East Lansing, MI
January 22; 6:30 pm, BTN	No. 14	Iowa	W 72–63	14–4 (4–2)	Value City Arena (16,040); Columbus, OH
January 26; 12:00 pm, ESPN2	No. 14	at Penn State	W 65–51	15–4 (5–2)	Bryce Jordan Center (11,212); University Park, PA
January 29; 7:00 pm, ESPN	No. 11	Wisconsin	W 58–49	16–4 (6–2)	Value City Arena (16,911); Columbus, OH
February 2; 7:00 pm, BTN	No. 11	at Nebraska	W 63–56	17–4 (7–2)	Bob Devaney Sports Center (11,478); Lincoln, NE
February 5; 9:00 pm, ESPN	No. 10	at No. 3 Michigan	L 74–76 ^{OT}	17–5 (7–3)	Crisler Center (12,693); Ann Arbor, MI
February 10; 1:00 pm, CBS	No. 10	No. 1 Indiana	L 68–81	17–6 (7–4)	Value City Arena (18,809); Columbus, OH
February 14; 7:00 pm, BTN	No. 13	Northwestern	W 69–59	18–6 (8–4)	Value City Arena (15,842); Columbus, OH
February 17; 1:00 pm, CBS	No. 13	at No. 20 Wisconsin	L 49–71	18–7 (8–5)	Kohl Center (17,249); Madison, WI
February 20; 7:00 pm, BTN	No. 18	Minnesota	W 71–45	19–7 (9–5)	Value City Arena (16,378); Columbus, OH
February 24; 4:00 pm, CBS	No. 18	No. 4 Michigan State	W 68–60	20–7 (10–5)	Value City Arena (18,809); Columbus, OH
February 28; 7:00 pm, ESPN2	No. 16	at Northwestern	W 63–53	21–7 (11–5)	Welsh-Ryan Arena (7,036); Evanston, IL
March 5; 9:00 pm, ESPN	No. 14	at No. 2 Indiana	W 67–58	22–7 (12–5)	Assembly Hall (17,472); Bloomington, IN
March 10; 12:30 pm, ESPN	No. 14	Illinois	W 68–55	23–7 (13–5)	Value City Arena (19,049); Columbus, OH
Big Ten tournament
March 15; 6:30 pm, BTN	No. 10	vs. Nebraska; Quarterfinal	W 71–50	24–7	United Center (21,229); Chicago, IL
March 16; 4:18 pm, CBS	No. 10	vs. No. 8 Michigan State; Semifinal	W 61–58	25–7	United Center (21,824); Chicago, IL
March 17; 3:30 pm, CBS	No. 10	vs. No. 22 Wisconsin; Championship	W 50–43	26–7	United Center (20,560); Chicago, IL
NCAA tournament
March 22*; 7:15 pm, CBS	No. 7 (2 W)	vs. (15 W) Iona; First round	W 95–70	27–7	University of Dayton Arena (12,495); Dayton, OH
March 24*; 12:15 pm, CBS	No. 7 (2 W)	vs. (10 W) Iowa State; Second round	W 78–75	28–7	University of Dayton Arena (12,495); Dayton, OH
March 28*; 7:47 pm, TBS	No. 7 (2 W)	vs. No. 21 (6 W) Arizona; Sweet Sixteen	W 73–70	29–7	Staples Center (18,232); Los Angeles, CA
March 30*; 7:10 pm, CBS	No. 7 (2 W)	vs. (9 W) Wichita State; Elite Eight	L 66–70	29–8	Staples Center (17,998); Los Angeles, CA
*Non-conference game. ^{#}Rankings from AP Poll. (#) Tournament seedings in parentheses. All times are in Eastern Time (#) during NCAA Tournament is Seed with Region W=West.

== Rankings ==
Regular season polls
Poll	Pre- season	Week 1	Week 2	Week 3	Week 4	Week 5	Week 6	Week 7	Week 8	Week 9	Week 10	Week 11	Week 12	Week 13	Week 14	Week 15	Week 16	Week 17	Week 18	Week 19	Final
AP	4	4	4	4	4	7	7	7	10	8	15	11	14	11	10	13	18	14	10	7	
Coaches	4	4	4	4	4	7	7	7	10	8	14	11	15	10	10	14	18	13	9	6	

Legend
	Increase in ranking
	Decrease in ranking
	Not ranked previous week
(RV)	Received votes
