= 2012–13 Kansas Jayhawks men's basketball team =

American college basketball season

2012–13 Kansas Jayhawks men's basketball

Big 12 tournament champions Big 12 regular season co-champions CBE Hall of Fame Classic champions

NCAA tournament, Sweet Sixteen
- Conference: Big 12

Ranking
- Coaches: No. 8
- AP: No. 3
- Record: 31–6 (14–4 Big 12)
- Head coach: Bill Self (10th Season)
- Assistant coaches: Joe Dooley (10th Season); Norm Roberts (2nd Season); Kurtis Townsend (9th Season)
- Captains: Elijah Johnson; Travis Releford; Jeff Withey
- Home arena: Allen Fieldhouse

2012–13 Big 12 men's basketball standings
	Conf.				Overall
Team	W		L	PCT	W		L	PCT
No. 3 Kansas †	14	–	4	.778	31	–	6	.838
No. 12 Kansas State	14	–	4	.778	27	–	8	.771
No. 17 Oklahoma State	13	–	5	.722	24	–	9	.727
Oklahoma	11	–	7	.611	20	–	12	.625
Iowa State	11	–	7	.611	23	–	12	.657
Baylor	9	–	9	.500	23	–	14	.622
Texas	7	–	11	.389	16	–	18	.471
West Virginia	6	–	12	.333	13	–	19	.406
Texas Tech	3	–	15	.167	11	–	20	.355
TCU	2	–	16	.111	11	–	21	.344
† 2013 Big 12 Tournament winner Rankings from AP poll

The 2012–13 Kansas Jayhawks men's basketball team represented the University of Kansas in the 2012–13 NCAA Division I men's basketball season, which is the Jayhawks' 115th basketball season. The Jayhawks played their home games at Allen Fieldhouse.

== Pre-season ==
=== Departures ===
Name	Position	Reason
Tyshawn Taylor	Point Guard	Graduation
Conner Teahan	Guard	Graduation
Jordan Juenemann	Guard	Graduation
Thomas Robinson	Power Forward	Entered NBA draft
Merv Lindsay	Small Forward	Transfer

=== Recruiting ===
College recruiting information
Name	Hometown	School	Height	Weight	Commit date
Perry Ellis; PF	Wichita, Kansas	Wichita Heights High School	6 ft 8 in (2.03 m)	221 lb (100 kg)	Sep 9, 2011
Perry Ellis; PF	Recruit ratings: Scout: Rivals: 247Sports: ESPN: (96)				
Andrew White; G/F	Charlottesville, Virginia	The Miller School	6 ft 6 in (1.98 m)	205 lb (93 kg)	Dec 2, 2011
Andrew White; G/F	Recruit ratings: Scout: Rivals: 247Sports: ESPN: (94)				
Zach Peters*; F/C	Plano, Texas	Prestonwood Christian	6 ft 9 in (2.06 m)	220 lb (100 kg)	Nov 17, 2011
Zach Peters*; F/C	Recruit ratings: Scout: Rivals: 247Sports: ESPN: (89)				
Anrio Adams; SG	Seattle, Washington	Ranier Beach High School	6 ft 3 in (1.91 m)	175 lb (79 kg)	Nov 20, 2011
Anrio Adams; SG	Recruit ratings: Scout: Rivals: 247Sports: ESPN: (91)				
Landen Lucas; F/C	Portland, Oregon	Westview High School	6 ft 8 in (2.03 m)	240 lb (110 kg)	Nov 13, 2011
Landen Lucas; F/C	Recruit ratings: Scout: Rivals: 247Sports: ESPN: (92)				
Overall recruiting rankings: Scout: 13 Rivals: 10 247 Sports: 13 ESPN: 11

*Left team during season

=== Coaching changes ===
Coach	Old Position	New Position
Brennan Bechard	Kansas Graduate Assistant Coach	Kansas Assistant Director of Men's Basketball Operations
Barry Hinson	Kansas Director of Basketball Operations	Southern Illinois Head Coach
Danny Manning	Kansas Assistant Coach	Tulsa Head Coach
Norm Roberts	Florida Assistant Coach	Kansas Assistant Coach
Doc Sadler	Nebraska Head Coach	Kansas Director of Basketball Operations

== Roster ==
2012–13 Kansas Jayhawks men's basketball team
Players
Coaches

Pos.	#	Name	Height	Weight	Year	Hometown
PG	1	Naadir Tharpe	5 ft 11 in (1.8 m)	170 lb (77 kg)	So	Worcester, MA
SG	2	Rio Adams	6 ft 3 in (1.91 m)	180 lb (82 kg)	Fr	Seattle, WA
G/F	3	Andrew White	6 ft 6 in (1.98 m)	210 lb (95 kg)	Fr	Chester, VA
F	4	Justin Wesley	6 ft 8 in (2.03 m)	220 lb (100 kg)	RS Jr	Fort Worth, TX
C	5	Jeff Withey	7 ft 0 in (2.13 m)	235 lb (107 kg)	RS Sr	San Diego, CA
SG	10	Evan Manning (W)	6 ft 3 in (1.91 m)	170 lb (77 kg)	Fr	Lawrence, KS
G	11	Tyler Self (W)	6 ft 2 in (1.88 m)	165 lb (75 kg)	Fr	Lawrence, KS
PG	15	Elijah Johnson	6 ft 4 in (1.93 m)	195 lb (88 kg)	Sr	Las Vegas, NV
PG	20	Niko Roberts (W)	5 ft 11 in (1.8 m)	175 lb (79 kg)	Jr	Huntington, NY
SG	21	Christian Garrett (W)	6 ft 3 in (1.91 m)	170 lb (77 kg)	So	Los Angeles, CA
G/F	23	Ben McLemore	6 ft 5 in (1.96 m)	185 lb (84 kg)	RS Fr	St. Louis, MO
SF	24	Travis Releford	6 ft 6 in (1.98 m)	210 lb (95 kg)	RS Sr	Kansas City, MO
F/C	31	Jamari Traylor	6 ft 8 in (2.03 m)	215 lb (98 kg)	RS Fr	Chicago, IL
F/C	33	Landen Lucas (redshirt)	6 ft 10 in (2.08 m)	230 lb (104 kg)	Fr	Portland, OR
PF	34	Perry Ellis	6 ft 8 in (2.03 m)	225 lb (102 kg)	Fr	Wichita, KS
PF	40	Kevin Young	6 ft 8 in (2.03 m)	195 lb (88 kg)	Sr	Perris, CA

Head coach

- Bill Self (Oklahoma State)

Assistant coach(es)

- Norm Roberts (Queens)
- Joe Dooley (George Washington)
- Kurtis Townsend (Western Kentucky)

Legend

- (C) Team captain
- (S) Suspended
- (I) Ineligible
- (W) Walk-on
- Injured
- Current redshirt

Roster
Last update: August 8, 2012

== Schedule ==
Date time, TV	Rank^{#}	Opponent^{#}	Result	Record	High points	High rebounds	High assists	Site (attendance) city, state
European Exhibition Tour
8/7/12*; 12:00 pm, None		at Swiss National Team; Euro Jam Fribourg	W 79–76	–	12 – Withey	10 – Withey	3 – Johnson	Fribourg Arena (250); Fribourg, Switzerland
8/8/12*; 10:00 am, None		at Swiss National Team; Euro Jam Fribourg	W 83–79	–	16 – White	10 – Withey	4 – Johnson, Releford	Fribourg Arena (200); Fribourg, Switzerland
8/11/12*; 1:00 pm, None		at AMW Team France; Euro Jam Paris	L 73–74	–	10 – Releford	7 – Peters	9 – Tharpe	Stade Pierre de Coubertin (2,000); Paris, France
8/12/12*; 1:00 pm, None		at AMW Team France; Euro Jam Paris	L 60–79	–	16 – Ellis	12 – Ellis	4 – Tharpe	Stade Pierre de Coubertin (2,000); Paris, France
Exhibition
10/30/12*; 7:00 pm, Jayhawk TV	No. 7	at Emporia State	W 88–54	–	15 – Ellis	9 – Lucas	5 – Johnson	Allen Fieldhouse (16,300); Lawrence, Kansas
11/5/12*; 7:00 pm, Jayhawk TV	No. 7	at Washburn	W 62–50	–	17 – McLemore	10 – McLemore	5 – Johnson	Allen Fieldhouse (16,300); Lawrence, Kansas
Non-conference regular season
11/9/12*; 7:00 pm, Jayhawk TV	No. 7	Southeast Missouri State; CBE Classic	W 74–55	1–0	17 – Withey	12 – McLemore, Withey	5 – McLemore	Allen Fieldhouse (16,300); Lawrence, Kansas
11/13/12*; 6:00 pm, ESPN	No. 7	vs. No. 21 Michigan State; Champions Classic	L 64–67	1–1	16 – Johnson	7 – Withey	3 – McLemore, Releford	Georgia Dome (22,847); Atlanta, Georgia
11/15/12*; 7:00 pm, Jayhawk TV	No. 7	Chattanooga; CBE Classic	W 69–55	2–1	25 – McLemore	10 – Withey	6 – Releford	Allen Fieldhouse (16,300); Lawrence, Kansas
11/19/12*; 9:00 pm, ESPN2	No. 12	vs. Washington State; CBE Classic	W 78–41	3–1	17 – Releford	10 – Young	4 – Johnson, Tharpe	Sprint Center (8,408); Kansas City, Missouri
11/20/12*; 8:30 pm, ESPNU	No. 12	vs. Saint Louis; CBE Classic	W 73–59	4–1	25 – Withey	8 – Young	9 – Johnson	Sprint Center (10,315); Kansas City, Missouri
11/26/12*; 8:00 pm, ESPNU	No. 10	San Jose State	W 70–57	5–1	16 – Withey	12 – Withey	5 – Johnson	Allen Fieldhouse (16,300); Lawrence, Kansas
11/30/12*; 7:00 pm, Jayhawk TV	No. 10	vs. Oregon State	W 84–78	6–1	21 – McLemore	7 – Releford	9 – Johnson	Sprint Center (18,789); Kansas City, Missouri
12/8/12*; 1:00 pm, ESPN2	No. 9	Colorado	W 90–54	7–1	24 – McLemore	8 – Young	6 – Releford	Allen Fieldhouse (16,300); Lawrence, Kansas
12/15/12*; 6:00 pm, ESPNU	No. 9	Belmont	W 89–60	8–1	17 – McLemore, Releford	6 – Young	9 – Johnson	Allen Fieldhouse (16,300); Lawrence, Kansas
12/18/12*; 6:00 pm, ESPN2	No. 9	Richmond	W 87–59	9–1	17 – Withey	13 – Withey	7 – Johnson	Allen Fieldhouse (16,300); Lawrence, Kansas
12/22/12*; 3:00 pm, CBS	No. 9	at No. 7 Ohio State	W 74–66	10–1	22 – McLemore	10 – Withey, Young	3 – Tharpe, Young	Value City Arena (19,049); Columbus, Ohio
12/29/12*; 7:00 pm, ESPN3	No. 6	American	W 89–57	11–1	19 – Releford	10 – Ellis	12 – Tharpe	Allen Fieldhouse (16,300); Lawrence, Kansas
1/6/13*; 3:30 pm, CBS	No. 6	Temple	W 69–62	12–1	16 – Young	11 – Withey	9 – Johnson	Allen Fieldhouse (16,300); Lawrence, Kansas
Big 12 Conference Games
1/9/13; 6:00 pm, ESPNU	No. 6	Iowa State	W 97–89 ^{OT}	13–1 (1–0)	33 – McLemore	12 – Young, Withey	10 – Johnson	Allen Fieldhouse (16,300); Lawrence, Kansas
1/12/13; 3:00 pm, Big 12 Network	No. 6	at Texas Tech	W 60–46	14–1 (2–0)	14 – Young	7 – Withey	4 – Johnson	United Spirit Arena (8,534); Lubbock, Texas
1/14/13; 8:00 pm, ESPN	No. 4	Baylor	W 61–44	15–1 (3–0)	17 – McLemore	8 – McLemore	2 – Ellis, McLemore, Releford	Allen Fieldhouse (16,300); Lawrence, Kansas
1/19/13; 1:00 pm, CBS	No. 4	at Texas	W 64–59	16–1 (4–0)	16 – McLemore	9 – Withey	4 – Withey	Frank Erwin Center (14,312); Austin, Texas
1/22/13; 7:00 pm, Big 12 Network	No. 3	at No. 11 Kansas State	W 59–55	17–1 (5–0)	12 – Releford	10 – Withey	4 – Johnson	Bramlage Coliseum (12,528); Manhattan, Kansas
1/26/13; 3:00 pm, ESPN	No. 3	Oklahoma	W 67–54	18–1 (6–0)	18 – McLemore	9 – Withey	5 – Releford	Allen Fieldhouse (16,300); Lawrence, Kansas
1/28/13; 8:00 pm, ESPN	No. 2	at West Virginia	W 61–56	19–1 (7–0)	15 – Releford, Withey	7 – Withey, Young	5 – Johnson	WVU Coliseum (12,402); Morgantown, West Virginia
2/2/13; 3:00 pm, Big 12 Network	No. 2	Oklahoma State	L 80–85	19–2 (7–1)	23 – McLemore	8 – Withey	6 – Johnson	Allen Fieldhouse (16,300); Lawrence, Kansas
2/6/13; 8:00 pm, ESPNU	No. 5	at TCU	L 55–62	19–3 (7–2)	15 – McLemore	9 – McLemore, Young	4 – Releford	Daniel-Meyer Coliseum (7,412); Fort Worth, Texas
2/9/13; 3:00 pm, ESPN	No. 5	at Oklahoma	L 66–72	19–4 (7–3)	15 – McLemore	9 – Releford	4 – Johnson	Lloyd Noble Center (13,490); Norman, Oklahoma
2/11/13; 8:11 pm, ESPN	No. 14	No. 10 Kansas State; Sunflower Showdown	W 83–62	20–4 (8–3)	30 – McLemore	10 – Withey	8 – Tharpe	Allen Fieldhouse (16,300); Lawrence, Kansas
2/16/13; 8:00 pm, ESPN	No. 14	Texas; ESPN College GameDay	W 73–47	21–4 (9–3)	15 – Withey, Releford	11 – Withey	4 – Johnson	Allen Fieldhouse (16,300); Lawrence, Kansas
2/20/13; 8:00 pm, ESPN2	No. 9	at No. 14 Oklahoma State	W 68–67 ^{2OT}	22–4 (10–3)	18 – Releford	14 – Withey	3 – Tharpe	Gallagher-Iba Arena (13,611); Stillwater, Oklahoma
2/23/13; 3:00 pm, Big 12 Network/ESPN3	No. 9	TCU	W 74–48	23–4 (11–3)	18 – Withey	8 – Young	4 – Johnson, Tharpe	Allen Fieldhouse (16,300); Lawrence, Kansas
2/25/13; 8:00 pm, ESPN	No. 6	at Iowa State	W 108-96 ^{OT}	24–4 (12–3)	39 – Johnson	10 – Withey	7 – Johnson	Hilton Coliseum (14,376); Ames, Iowa
3/2/13; 1:00 pm, CBS	No. 6	West Virginia	W 91–65	25–4 (13–3)	36 – McLemore	10 – Withey	10 – Johnson	Allen Fieldhouse (16,300); Lawrence, Kansas
3/4/13; 6:00 pm, ESPNU	No. 4	Texas Tech	W 79–42	26-4 (14-3)	22 – Withey	9 – Withey	12 – Johnson	Allen Fieldhouse (16,300); Lawrence, Kansas
3/9/13; 5:00 pm, ESPN	No. 4	at Baylor	L 58–81	26–5 (14–4)	23 – McLemore	8 – Withey	2 – Releford, Johnson, McLemore, Ellis	Ferrell Center (9,695); Waco, Texas
Big 12 Tournament
03/14/13; 2:00 pm, ESPN2	No. 7	vs. Texas Tech; Quarterfinals	W 91–63	27–5	24 – McLemore	7 – Ellis	5 – Releford	Sprint Center (17,996); Kansas City, MO
03/15/13; 6:30 pm, Big 12 Network/ESPNU	No. 7	vs. Iowa State; Semifinals	W 88–73	28–5	23 – Ellis	7 – McLenmore	8 – Tharpe	Sprint Center (19,160); Kansas City, MO
03/16/13; 5:00 pm, ESPN	No. 7	vs. No. 11 Kansas State; Championship Game	W 70–54	29–5	17 – Withey	9 – Withey, Young	3 – Johnson, McLemore, Young	Sprint Center (19,256); Kansas City, MO
NCAA tournament
03/22/13*; 9:07 pm, TNT	No. 3 (1 S)	vs. (16 S) WKU; Second Round	W 64–57	30–5	17 – Withey	8 – Young	3 – Tharpe	Sprint Center (18,488); Kansas City, MO
03/24/13*; 4:25 pm, CBS	No. 3 (1 S)	vs. (8 S) North Carolina; Third Round	W 70–58	31–5	22 – T. Releford	16 – J. Withey	4 – E. Johnson	Sprint Center (18,498); Kansas City, MO
03/29/2013*; 6:37 pm, TBS	No. 3 (1 S)	vs. No. 10 (4 S) Michigan; Sweet Sixteen	L 85–87 ^{OT}	31–6	20 – McLemore	8 – Withey	7 – Tharpe	Cowboys Stadium; Arlington, TX
*Non-conference game. ^{#}Rankings from AP Poll. (#) Tournament seedings in parentheses. All times are in Central Time. For NCAA tournament, number in parentheses is seed, letter indicates region.

== Rankings ==
Ranking movements Legend: ██ Increase in ranking ██ Decrease in ranking
	Week																				
Poll	Pre	1	2	3	4	5	6	7	8	9	10	11	12	13	14	15	16	17	18	19	Final
AP	7	7	12	10	9	9	9	6	9	6	6	4	3	2	5	14	9	6	4	3	N/A*
Coaches	7	7	11	10	9	9	8	6	8	6	6	4	2	1	5	13	9	5	3	3	8

*AP does not release post-tournament rankings
