= 2011–12 Minnesota Golden Gophers men's basketball team =

American college basketball season

2011–12 Minnesota Golden Gophers men's basketball

NIT Runner-up vs. Stanford, L 75–51
- Conference: Big Ten Conference
- Record: 23–15 (6–12 Big Ten)
- Head coach: Tubby Smith
- Assistant coaches: Ron Jirsa; Saul Smith; Vince Taylor
- Home arena: Williams Arena

2011–12 Big Ten Conference men's basketball standings
| | Conf. | | | | Overall |
| Team | W | | L | PCT | W | | L | PCT |
|---|---|---|---|---|---|---|---|---|
| No. 5 Michigan State† | 13 | – | 5 | .722 | 29 | – | 8 | .784 |
| No. 13 Michigan | 13 | – | 5 | .722 | 24 | – | 10 | .706 |
| No. 7 Ohio State | 13 | – | 5 | .722 | 31 | – | 8 | .795 |
| No. 14 Wisconsin | 12 | – | 6 | .667 | 26 | – | 10 | .722 |
| No. 16 Indiana | 11 | – | 7 | .611 | 27 | – | 9 | .750 |
| Purdue | 10 | – | 8 | .556 | 22 | – | 13 | .629 |
| Northwestern | 8 | – | 10 | .444 | 19 | – | 14 | .576 |
| Iowa | 8 | – | 10 | .444 | 18 | – | 17 | .514 |
| Illinois | 6 | – | 12 | .333 | 17 | – | 15 | .531 |
| Minnesota | 6 | – | 12 | .333 | 23 | – | 15 | .605 |
| Nebraska | 4 | – | 14 | .222 | 12 | – | 18 | .400 |
| Penn State | 4 | – | 14 | .222 | 12 | – | 20 | .375 |
† 2012 Big Ten tournament winner Rankings from AP poll

The 2011–12 Minnesota Golden Gophers men's basketball team represented the University of Minnesota in the college basketball season of 2011–2012. The team's head coach, Tubby Smith was in his fifth year at Minnesota. The Golden Gophers played their home games at Williams Arena in Minneapolis, Minnesota, U.S., and are members of the newly expanded Big Ten Conference.

== Season ==
With the departure of seniors Blake Hoffarber and Al Nolen, the Gophers entered the season under the leadership of returning members, including veterans Trevor Mbakwe and Ralph Sampson III.

The Gophers also lost junior Colton Iverson, who transferred to play for the Colorado State Rams at the end of the previous season.

On November 27, during the championship game of the Old Spice Classic, Trevor Mbakwe tore his ACL and missed the remainder of the season.

Freshman guard Andre Hollins was named to the All-Tournament Team at the conclusion of the Big Ten tournament championship game on March 11.

== Roster ==
| # | Name | Height | Weight (lbs.) | Position | Class | Hometown | Previous team(s) |
|---|---|---|---|---|---|---|---|
| 00 | Julian Welch | 6'3" | 195 | G | Jr. | Elk Grove, CA, U.S. | Franklin HS |
| 1 | Andre Hollins | 6'1" | 200 | G | Fr. | Memphis, TN, U.S. | White Station HS |
| 10 | Oto Osenieks | 6'8" | 205 | F | RFr. | Riga, Latvia | Brehm Prep |
| 11 | Joe Coleman | 6'4" | 208 | G | Fr. | Minneapolis, MN, U.S. | Hopkins HS |
| 13 | Maverick Ahanmisi | 6'2" | 192 | G | So. | Santa Clarita, CA, U.S. | Stoneridge Prep |
| 15 | Maurice Walker | 6'10" | 289 | F | So. | Scarborough, Ontario, Canada | Brewster Academy |
| 20 | Austin Hollins | 6'4" | 185 | G | So. | Germantown, TN, U.S. | Germantown HS |
| 22 | Chris Halvorsen | 6'8" | 214 | F | RSo. | St. Paul, MN, U.S. | Henry Sibley HS |
| 23 | Chip Armelin | 6'3" | 198 | G | So. | Sulphur, LA, U.S. | Sulphur HS |
| 30 | Andre Ingram | 6'7" | 213 | F | Jr. | Minneapolis, MN, U.S. | Minnesota Transitions |
| 32 | Trevor Mbakwe | 6'8" | 245 | F | RSr. | Saint Paul, MN, U.S. | St. Bernard's HS; Miami Dade College |
| 33 | Rodney Williams | 6'7" | 200 | F | Jr. | Minneapolis, MN, U.S. | Robbinsdale Cooper HS |
| 34 | Kendal Shell | 6'0" | 190 | G | Fr. | St. Louis, MO, U.S. | Webster Groves HS |
| 50 | Ralph Sampson III | 6'11" | 241 | F/C | Sr. | Duluth, GA, U.S. | Northview HS |
| 55 | Elliott Eliason | 6'11" | 260 | C | RFr. | Chadron, NE, U.S. | Chadron HS |

== 2011–12 schedule and results ==
| Date time, TV | Rank^{#} | Opponent^{#} | Result | Record | Site (attendance) city, state |
Exhibition
| November 1, 2011*; 7:00 pm | | Bemidji | W 71–58 | — | Williams Arena (10,653); Minneapolis, MN |
| November 7, 2011*; 7:00 pm | | Augustana (SD) | W 72–60 | — | Williams Arena (10,644); Minneapolis, MN |
Regular season
| November 11, 2011*; 7:00 pm | | Bucknell | W 70–58 | 1–0 | Williams Arena (11,976); Minneapolis, MN |
| November 14, 2011*; 7:00 pm | | South Dakota State | W 71–55 | 2–0 | Williams Arena (10,460); Minneapolis, MN |
| November 17, 2011*; 6:00 pm, BTN | | Fairfield | W 67–57 | 3–0 | Williams Arena (10,641); Minneapolis, MN |
| November 21, 2011*; 7:00 pm | | Mount St. Mary's | W 85–56 | 4–0 | Williams Arena (10,487); Minneapolis, MN |
| November 24, 2011*; 1:30 pm, ESPN2 | | vs. DePaul; Old Spice Classic Quarterfinal | W 86–85 | 5–0 | HP Field House (3,170); Orlando, FL |
| November 25, 2011*; 11:00 am, ESPN | | vs. Indiana State; Old Spice Classic Semifinal | W 76–69 | 6–0 | HP Field House (3,377); Orlando, FL |
| November 27, 2011*; 6:00 pm, ESPN2 | | vs. Dayton; Old Spice Classic Championship | L 70–86 | 6–1 | HP Field House (3,874); Orlando, FL |
| November 30, 2011*; 8:15 pm, ESPN2 | | Virginia Tech; ACC – Big Ten Challenge | W 58–55 | 7–1 | Williams Arena (10,487); Minneapolis, MN |
| December 3, 2011*; 1:15 pm, BTN | | USC | W 55–40 | 8–1 | Williams Arena (11,762); Minneapolis, MN |
| December 6, 2011*; 7:00 pm, BTN | | Appalachian State | W 70–56 | 9–1 | Williams Arena (10,782); Minneapolis, MN |
| December 10, 2011*; 12:00 pm | | Saint Peter's | W 69–47 | 10–1 | Williams Arena (11,007); Minneapolis, MN |
| December 13, 2011*; 8:00 pm, ESPN | | Central Michigan | W 76–56 | 11–1 | Williams Arena (10,290); Minneapolis, MN |
| December 22, 2011*; 7:00 pm | | North Dakota State | W 63–59 | 12–1 | Williams Arena (11,681); Minneapolis, MN |
Big Ten regular season
| December 27, 2011; 6:30 pm, BTN | | at Illinois | L 72–81 ^{2OT} | 12–2 (0–1) | Assembly Hall (15,549); Champaign, IL |
| January 1, 2012; 3:00 pm, BTN | | at No. 18 Michigan | L 56–61 | 12–3 (0–2) | Crisler Arena (12,721); Ann Arbor, MI |
| January 4, 2012; 8:00 pm, BTN | | Iowa | L 62–64 | 12–4 (0–3) | Williams Arena (12,018); Minneapolis, MN |
| January 8, 2012; 5:00 pm, BTN | | Purdue | L 66–79 | 12–5 (0–4) | Williams Arena (11,761); Minneapolis, MN |
| January 12, 2012; 7:00 pm, BTN | | at No. 7 Indiana | W 77–74 | 13–5 (1–4) | Assembly Hall (17,373); Bloomington, IN |
| January 15, 2012; 3:00 pm, BTN | | at Penn State | W 80–66 | 14–5 (2–4) | Bryce Jordan Center (9,065); University Park, PA |
| January 22, 2012; 3:00 pm, BTN | | Northwestern | W 75–52 | 15–5 (3–4) | Williams Arena (12,219); Minneapolis, MN |
| January 25, 2012; 7:30 pm, BTN | | at No. 10 Michigan State | L 52–68 | 15–6 (3–5) | Breslin Center (14,797); East Lansing, MI |
| January 28, 2012; 7:00 pm, BTN | | Illinois | W 77–72 ^{OT} | 16–6 (4–5) | Williams Arena (14,625); Minneapolis, MN |
| February 1, 2012; 7:30 pm, BTN | | at Iowa | L 59–63 | 16–7 (4–6) | Carver-Hawkeye Arena (11,232); Iowa City, IA |
| February 5, 2012; 12:00 pm, BTN | | at Nebraska | W 69–61 | 17–7 (5–6) | Bob Devaney Sports Center (9,857); Lincoln, NE |
| February 9, 2012; 6:00 pm, ESPN | | No. 21 Wisconsin | L 61–68 ^{OT} | 17–8 (5–7) | Williams Arena (14,625); Minneapolis, MN |
| February 14, 2012; 8:00 pm, ESPN | | No. 6 Ohio State | L 68–78 | 17–9 (5–8) | Williams Arena (13,245); Minneapolis, MN |
| February 18, 2012; 6:00 pm, BTN | | at Northwestern | L 53–64 | 17–10 (5–9) | Welsh-Ryan Arena (7,522); Evanston, IL |
| February 22, 2012; 7:30 pm, BTN | | No. 6 Michigan State | L 61–66 | 17–11 (5–10) | Williams Arena (13,331); Minneapolis, MN |
| February 26, 2012; 12:00 pm, ESPN | | No. 23 Indiana | L 50–69 | 17–12 (5–11) | Williams Arena (11,421); Minneapolis, MN |
| February 28, 2012; 7:00 pm, BTN | | at No. 14 Wisconsin | L 45–52 | 17–13 (5–12) | Kohl Center (17,230); Madison, WI |
| March 3, 2012; 11:30 am, BTN | | Nebraska | W 81–69 | 18–13 (6–12) | Williams Arena (11,262); Minneapolis, MN |
Big Ten tournament
| March 8, 2012; 4:30 pm, ESPN2 | (10) | vs. (7) Northwestern; First Round | W 75–68 ^{OT} | 19–13 | Bankers Life Fieldhouse (17,257); Indianapolis, IN |
| March 9, 2012; 5:30 pm, BTN | (10) | vs. (2) No. 10 Michigan; Quarterfinals | L 69–73 ^{OT} | 19–14 | Bankers Life Fieldhouse (18,484); Indianapolis, IN |
NIT
| March 14, 2012*; 6:00 pm, ESPN2 | (6) | at (3) La Salle; First Round | W 70–61 | 20–14 | Tom Gola Arena (3,023); Philadelphia, PA |
| March 19, 2012*; 8:00 pm, ESPN | (6) | at (2) Miami (FL); Second Round | W 78–60 | 21–14 | BankUnited Center (1,649); Coral Gables, FL |
| March 21, 2012*; 6:00 pm, ESPN2 | (6) | at (4) Middle Tennessee; Quarterfinals | W 78–72 | 22–14 | Murphy Center (10,521); Murfreesboro, TN |
| March 27, 2012*; 8:00 pm, ESPN2 | (6) | vs. (1) Washington; Semifinals | W 68–67 ^{OT} | 23–14 | Madison Square Garden (7,574); New York, NY |
| March 29, 2012*; 6:00 pm, ESPN | (6) | vs. (3) Stanford; Championship | L 51–75 | 23–15 | Madison Square Garden (5,494); New York, NY |
*Non-conference game. ^{#}Rankings from AP Poll. (#) Tournament seedings in parentheses. All times are in Central Time.

== Rankings ==
| Poll | Pre | Wk 1 | Wk 2 | Wk 3 | Wk 4 | Wk 5 | Wk 6 | Wk 7 | Wk 8 | Wk 9 | Wk 10 | Wk 11 | Wk 12 | Wk 13 | Wk 14 | Wk 15 | Wk 16 | Wk 17 | Wk 18 | Final |
|---|---|---|---|---|---|---|---|---|---|---|---|---|---|---|---|---|---|---|---|---|
| AP | RV | RV | RV | NR | | | | | | | | | | | | | | | | |
| Coaches | NR | | | | | | | | | | | | | | | | | | | |

| Increase in ranking | Decrease in ranking | No change | RV | Received votes | NR | Not ranked |
