= 2011–12 Iowa Hawkeyes men's basketball team =

American college basketball season

2011–12 Iowa Hawkeyes men's basketball

NIT, Second Round
- Conference: Big Ten Conference
- Record: 18–17 (8–10 Big Ten)
- Head coach: Fran McCaffery (2nd season)
- Assistant coaches: Sherman Dillard; Andrew Francis; Kirk Speraw
- Home arena: Carver-Hawkeye Arena (Capacity: 15,500)

2011–12 Big Ten Conference men's basketball standings
	Conf.				Overall
Team	W		L	PCT	W		L	PCT
No. 5 Michigan State†	13	–	5	.722	29	–	8	.784
No. 13 Michigan	13	–	5	.722	24	–	10	.706
No. 7 Ohio State	13	–	5	.722	31	–	8	.795
No. 14 Wisconsin	12	–	6	.667	26	–	10	.722
No. 16 Indiana	11	–	7	.611	27	–	9	.750
Purdue	10	–	8	.556	22	–	13	.629
Northwestern	8	–	10	.444	19	–	14	.576
Iowa	8	–	10	.444	18	–	17	.514
Illinois	6	–	12	.333	17	–	15	.531
Minnesota	6	–	12	.333	23	–	15	.605
Nebraska	4	–	14	.222	12	–	18	.400
Penn State	4	–	14	.222	12	–	20	.375
† 2012 Big Ten tournament winner Rankings from AP poll

The 2011–12 Iowa Hawkeyes men's basketball team represented the University of Iowa in the 2011–12 college basketball season. The team was led by 2nd year head coach Fran McCaffery and played their home games at Carver-Hawkeye Arena, which has been their home since 1983. They were members of the Big Ten Conference. They finished the season with 18–17 record, 8–10 in Big Ten play finished in a tie with Northwestern in 7th place. They made to the 2012 Big Ten Conference men's basketball tournament where they defeated Illinois in the first round but then lost to Michigan State in the quarterfinals. They made to the 2012 National Invitation Tournament, where they beat Dayton in the first round, and lost to Oregon in the second round.

== Roster ==
The 2011–12 Iowa Hawkeyes squad contained 16 players which include 4 freshmen, 1 redshirt freshman, 6 sophomores, 2 juniors, 3 seniors, and 1 redshirt senior.

2011–12 Iowa Hawkeyes men's basketball team
Players
Coaches

Pos.	#	Name	Height	Weight	Year	Hometown
C	0	Gabriel Olaseni	6 ft 10 in (2.08 m)	225 lb (102 kg)	Fr	London, England
F	1	Melsahn Basabe	6 ft 7 in (2.01 m)	225 lb (102 kg)	So	Glen Cove, NY
G	2	Josh Oglesby	6 ft 5 in (1.96 m)	185 lb (84 kg)	Fr	Cedar Rapids, IA
F	3	Cody Cox	6 ft 4 in (1.93 m)	190 lb (86 kg)	So	Waterloo, IA
G/F	4	Roy Devyn Marble	6 ft 5 in (1.96 m)	190 lb (86 kg)	So	Southfield, MI
G	5	Matt Gatens	6 ft 5 in (1.96 m)	215 lb (98 kg)	Sr	Iowa City, IA
F	11	Christopher Rickert	6 ft 3 in (1.91 m)	180 lb (82 kg)	Jr	Sioux City, IA
G	13	Kyle Denning	6 ft 2 in (1.88 m)	175 lb (79 kg)	Fr	Cedar Falls, IA
G	14	Steven McCarty	6 ft 0 in (1.83 m)	160 lb (73 kg)	So	Auburn Hills, MI
F	15	Zach McCabe	6 ft 7 in (2.01 m)	225 lb (102 kg)	So	Sioux City, IA
F	20	Andrew Brommer	6 ft 9 in (2.06 m)	235 lb (107 kg)	Sr	Rosemount, MN
G	24	Bryce Cartwright	6 ft 1 in (1.85 m)	180 lb (82 kg)	Sr	Compton, CA
G	25	Eric May	6 ft 5 in (1.96 m)	220 lb (100 kg)	Jr	Dubuque, IA
F	30	Aaron White	6 ft 8 in (2.03 m)	225 lb (102 kg)	Fr	Strongsville, OH
G	32	Brandon Stubbs	6 ft 2 in (1.88 m)	170 lb (77 kg)	So	Pleasant Hill, IA
F	34	Darius Stokes	6 ft 7 in (2.01 m)	190 lb (86 kg)	RS Fr	Cedar Rapids, IA
F	35	Devon Archie	6 ft 9 in (2.06 m)	225 lb (102 kg)	RS Sr	Indianapolis, IN

Head coach

- Fran McCaffery

Assistant coach(es)

- Sherman Dillard
- Andrew Francis
- Kirk Speraw

Athletic trainer(s)

- John Sreif

Legend

- (C) Team captain
- (S) Suspended
- (I) Ineligible
- (W) Walk-on
- Injured
- Current redshirt

Roster
Last update: 2011-12-19

== 2011 Commitments ==
College recruiting information
Name	Hometown	School	Height	Weight	Commit date
Josh Oglesby; SG	Cedar Rapids, IA	Cedar Rapids Washington High School	6 ft 5 in (1.96 m)	180 lb (82 kg)	Sep 29, 2010
Josh Oglesby; SG	Recruit ratings: Scout: Rivals: ESPN: (91)				
Gabe Olaseni; C	London, England	Sunrise Christian Academy	6 ft 10 in (2.08 m)	225 lb (102 kg)	Apr 26, 2011
Gabe Olaseni; C	Recruit ratings: Scout: Rivals: (40)				
Aaron White; SF	Strongsville, OH	Strongsville High School	6 ft 8 in (2.03 m)	210 lb (95 kg)	Oct 4, 2010
Aaron White; SF	Recruit ratings: Scout: Rivals: ESPN: (89)				
Overall recruit ranking:
Note: In many cases, Scout, Rivals, 247Sports, On3, and ESPN may conflict in their listings of height and weight.; In these cases, the average was taken. ESPN grades are on a 100-point scale.; Sources: "ESPN- Iowa Hawkeyes Men's Basketball Recruiting". ESPN.; "2011 Team Ranking". Rivals.

== Schedule and results ==
Date time, TV	Rank^{#}	Opponent^{#}	Result	Record	Site (attendance) city, state
Exhibition
11/06/2011*; 3:30 pm		Northwest Missouri State	W 79–59	–	Carver-Hawkeye Arena (10,854); Iowa City, IA
Regular season
11/11/2011*; 7:00 pm		Chicago State; Dale Howard Classic	W 96–53	1–0	Carver-Hawkeye Arena (12,897); Iowa City, IA
11/14/2011*; 7:00 pm		North Carolina A&T; Dale Howard Classic	W 95–79	2–0	Carver-Hawkeye Arena (8,891); Iowa City, IA
11/17/2011*; 7:00 pm		Northern Illinois	W 88–55	3–0	Carver-Hawkeye Arena (9,666); Iowa City, IA
11/20/2011*; 3:00 pm, BTN		vs. Creighton; Dale Howard Classic	L 59–82	3–1	Wells Fargo Arena (12,746); Des Moines, IA
11/23/2011*; 7:00 pm		Campbell; Dale Howard Classic	L 61–77	3–2	Carver-Hawkeye Arena (10,501); Iowa City, IA
11/26/2011*; 12:00 pm		IPFW	W 82–72	4–2	Carver-Hawkeye Arena (9,904); Iowa City, IA
11/29/2011*; 8:15 pm, ESPNU		Clemson; ACC-Big Ten Challenge	L 55–71	4–3	Carver-Hawkeye Arena (10,449); Iowa City, IA
12/03/2011*; 2:00 pm		Brown	W 75–54	5–3	Carver-Hawkeye Arena (10,399); Iowa City, IA
12/06/2011*; 7:00 pm, KWWL		at Northern Iowa; Iowa Big Four	L 60–80	5–4	McLeod Center (6,834); Cedar Falls, IA
12/09/2011*; 7:00 pm, CTN		at Iowa State; Iowa Corn Cy-Hawk Series	L 76–86	5–5	Hilton Coliseum (14,356); Ames, IA
12/17/2011*; 8:00 pm, BTN		Drake; Iowa Big Four	W 82–68	6–5	Carver-Hawkeye Arena (10,479); Iowa City, IA
12/19/2011*; 7:05 pm		Central Arkansas	W 105–64	7–5	Carver-Hawkeye Arena (9,382); Iowa City, IA
12/22/2011*; 7:30 pm		Boise State	W 81–72	8–5	Carver-Hawkeye Arena (13,122); Iowa City, IA
12/28/2011; 8:30 pm, BTN		Purdue	L 76–79	8–6 (0–1)	Carver-Hawkeye Arena (13,314); Iowa City, IA
12/31/2011; 12:00 pm, BTN		at No. 11 Wisconsin	W 72–65	9–6 (1–1)	Kohl Center (17,230); Madison, WI
01/04/2012; 8:00 pm, BTN		at Minnesota	W 64–62	10–6 (2–1)	Williams Arena (12,018); Minneapolis, MN
01/07/2012; 2:00 pm, BTN		No. 6 Ohio State	L 47–76	10–7 (2–2)	Carver-Hawkeye Arena (15,400); Iowa City, IA
01/10/2012; 6:00 pm, BTN		at No. 6 Michigan State	L 61–95	10–8 (2–3)	Breslin Center (14,797); East Lansing, MI
01/14/2012; 12:00 pm, BTN		No. 13 Michigan	W 75–59	11–8 (3–3)	Carver-Hawkeye Arena (12,366); Iowa City, IA
01/17/2012; 7:00 pm, BTN		at Purdue	L 68–75	11–9 (3–4)	Mackey Arena (14,134); West Lafayette, IN
01/26/2012; 6:00 pm, ESPNU		Nebraska; Rivalry	L 73–79	11–10 (3–5)	Carver-Hawkeye Arena (10,538); Iowa City, IA
01/29/2012; 5:00 pm, BTN		at No. 16 Indiana	L 89–103	11–11 (3–6)	Assembly Hall (17,243); Bloomington, IN
02/01/2012; 7:35 pm, BTN		Minnesota	W 63–59	12–11 (4–6)	Carver-Hawkeye Arena (11,232); Iowa City, IA
02/04/2012; 2:00 pm, ESPNU		Penn State	W 77–64	13–11 (5–6)	Carver-Hawkeye Arena (13,510); Iowa City, IA
02/09/2012; 8:00 pm, ESPNU		at Northwestern	L 64–83	13–12 (5–7)	Welsh-Ryan Arena (6,013); Evanston, IL
02/16/2012; 7:00 pm, ESPNU		at Penn State	L 64–69	13–13 (5–8)	Bryce Jordan Center (6,794); University Park, PA
02/19/2012; 5:00 pm, BTN		No. 18 Indiana	W 78–66	14–13 (6–8)	Carver-Hawkeye Arena (13,282); Iowa City, IA
02/23/2012; 8:00 pm, ESPN2		No. 16 Wisconsin	W 67–66	15–13 (7–8)	Carver-Hawkeye Arena (14,248); Iowa City, IA
02/26/2012; 5:00 pm, BTN		at Illinois	L 54–65	15–14 (7–9)	Assembly Hall (16,322); Champaign, IL
02/29/2012; 8:00 pm, ESPNU		at Nebraska; Rivalry	W 62–53	16–14 (8–9)	Bob Devaney Sports Center (8,039); Lincoln, NE
03/03/2012; 1:30 pm, BTN		Northwestern	L 66–70	16–15 (8–10)	Carver-Hawkeye Arena (15,400); Iowa City, IA
2012 Big Ten tournament
03/08/2012; 10:30 am, BTN		vs. Illinois; First Round	W 64–61	17–15	Bankers Life Fieldhouse (N/A); Indianapolis, IN
03/09/2012; 11:00 am, ESPN		vs. No. 8 Michigan State; Quarterfinals	L 75–92	17–16	Bankers Life Fieldhouse (18,484); Indianapolis, IN
2012 National Invitation Tournament
03/13/2012*; 6:30 pm, ESPN	No. (S 7)	at No. (S 2) Dayton; First Round	W 84–75	18–16	Carver-Hawkeye Arena (13,190); Iowa City, IA
03/18/2012*; 4:00 pm, ESPNU	No. (S 7)	at No. (S 3) Oregon; Second Round	L 97–108	18–17	Matthew Knight Arena (7,590); Eugene, OR
*Non-conference game. ^{#}Rankings from AP Poll. (#) Tournament seedings in parentheses.
