= 2011–12 Indiana Hoosiers men's basketball team =

American college basketball season

2011–12 Indiana Hoosiers men's basketball

NCAA tournament, Sweet Sixteen
- Conference: Big Ten Conference

Ranking
- Coaches: No. 13
- AP: No. 16
- Record: 27–9 (11–7 Big Ten)
- Head coach: Tom Crean (4th season)
- Assistant coaches: Tim Buckley (4th season); Bennie Seltzer (4th season); Steve McClain (2nd season)
- Captain: Verdell Jones III
- Home arena: Assembly Hall

2011–12 Big Ten Conference men's basketball standings
	Conf.				Overall
Team	W		L	PCT	W		L	PCT
No. 5 Michigan State†	13	–	5	.722	29	–	8	.784
No. 13 Michigan	13	–	5	.722	24	–	10	.706
No. 7 Ohio State	13	–	5	.722	31	–	8	.795
No. 14 Wisconsin	12	–	6	.667	26	–	10	.722
No. 16 Indiana	11	–	7	.611	27	–	9	.750
Purdue	10	–	8	.556	22	–	13	.629
Northwestern	8	–	10	.444	19	–	14	.576
Iowa	8	–	10	.444	18	–	17	.514
Illinois	6	–	12	.333	17	–	15	.531
Minnesota	6	–	12	.333	23	–	15	.605
Nebraska	4	–	14	.222	12	–	18	.400
Penn State	4	–	14	.222	12	–	20	.375
† 2012 Big Ten tournament winner Rankings from AP poll

The 2011–12 Indiana Hoosiers men's basketball team represented Indiana University in the 2011–12 college basketball season. Their head coach was Tom Crean, in his fourth season with the Hoosiers. The team played its home games at Assembly Hall in Bloomington, Indiana, and was a member of the Big Ten Conference. They finished the season 27–9 overall and 11–7 in Big Ten play. They advanced to the second round of the 2012 Big Ten Conference men's basketball tournament before falling to Wisconsin. They received an at-large bid to the 2012 NCAA Division I men's basketball tournament, where they advanced to the Sweet Sixteen before falling to eventual champion Kentucky.

== Preseason ==
Coach Tom Crean signed a three-man class in 2011.

College recruiting
Name	Hometown	School	Height	Weight	Commit date
Remy Abell; SF	Louisville, Kentucky	Eastern	6 ft 4 in (1.93 m)	197 lb (89 kg)	Apr 27, 2011
Remy Abell; SF	Recruit ratings: Scout: Rivals: (87)				
Austin Etherington; SF	Cicero, Indiana	Hamilton Heights	6 ft 6 in (1.98 m)	195 lb (88 kg)	Aug 3, 2009
Austin Etherington; SF	Recruit ratings: Scout: Rivals: (91)				
Cody Zeller; PF	Washington, Indiana	Washington	6 ft 11 in (2.11 m)	215 lb (98 kg)	Nov 11, 2010
Cody Zeller; PF	Recruit ratings: Scout: Rivals: (97)				
Overall recruit ranking: Scout: 26 Rivals: 27
Note: In many cases, Scout, Rivals, 247Sports, On3, and ESPN may conflict in their listings of height and weight.; In these cases, the average was taken. ESPN grades are on a 100-point scale.; Sources: "2011 Team Ranking". Rivals.

== Season ==
On December 10, 2011, Indiana beat Kentucky, 73–72 after a last-second shot by Christian Watford. Video of Indiana fans reacting to the shot around the country went viral. ESPN commentator Dick Vitale, who was covering the game for the network, said it was the "best game of the year" and that "[t]he atmosphere there was unreal, as I felt the building shaking after Watford hit the shot." According to Bob Kravitz, the win marked "a day when Hoosier Hysteria was restored to something akin to its former glory."

On December 31, 2011, the Hoosiers knocked off 2nd ranked Ohio State and in doing so became the first IU team in history to knock off the top two ranked teams in the same season. On February 28, 2012, they again beat a Top 5 team by beating No. 5 Michigan State, and became the first IU team since the undefeated 1975–76 team to beat three Top 5 teams in the same year. The Hoosiers earned a number four seed in the 2012 NCAA tournament and defeated New Mexico State in the second round. After defeating VCU in the third round, the Hoosiers lost to eventual champion Kentucky in the Sweet Sixteen 102–90, as the Wildcats avenged their lone regular season loss.

== Roster ==
2011–12 Indiana Hoosiers men's basketball team
Players
Coaches

Pos.	#	Name	Height	Weight	Year	Hometown
G	0	Kory Barnett	6 ft 5 in (1.96 m)	186 lb (84 kg)	Sr	Rochester, Indiana
G	1	Jordan Hulls	6 ft 0 in (1.83 m)	181 lb (82 kg)	Jr	Bloomington, Indiana
F	2	Christian Watford	6 ft 9 in (2.06 m)	232 lb (105 kg)	Jr	Birmingham, Alabama
G	3	Maurice Creek (injured)	6 ft 5 in (1.96 m)	195 lb (88 kg)	Jr	Oxon Hill, Maryland
G	4	Victor Oladipo	6 ft 5 in (1.96 m)	214 lb (97 kg)	So	Hyattsville, Maryland
F	10	Will Sheehey	6 ft 6 in (1.98 m)	200 lb (91 kg)	So	Stuart, Florida
G	11	Daniel Moore	5 ft 10 in (1.78 m)	175 lb (79 kg)	Sr	Carmel, Indiana
G	12	Verdell Jones III (injured)	6 ft 5 in (1.96 m)	195 lb (88 kg)	Sr	Champaign, Illinois
F	13	Austin Etherington	6 ft 6 in (1.98 m)	198 lb (90 kg)	Fr	Cicero, Indiana
G	15	Raphael Smith	6 ft 3 in (1.91 m)	175 lb (79 kg)	RS Fr	South Bend, Indiana
G	20	Taylor Wayer	5 ft 11 in (1.8 m)	172 lb (78 kg)	So	Indianapolis, Indiana
G	23	Remy Abell	6 ft 3 in (1.91 m)	195 lb (88 kg)	Fr	Louisville, Kentucky
F	24	Jeff Howard	6 ft 8 in (2.03 m)	238 lb (108 kg)	So	Westfield, Indiana
F	25	Tom Pritchard	6 ft 9 in (2.06 m)	245 lb (111 kg)	Sr	Westlake, Ohio
G	30	Matt Roth	6 ft 3 in (1.91 m)	185 lb (84 kg)	Sr	Washington, Illinois
F	32	Derek Elston	6 ft 9 in (2.06 m)	225 lb (102 kg)	Jr	Tipton, Indiana
C	40	Cody Zeller	6 ft 11 in (2.11 m)	230 lb (104 kg)	Fr	Washington, Indiana

Head coach

- Tom Crean

Assistant coach(es)

- Tim Buckley
- Bennie Seltzer
- Steve McClain

Legend

- (C) Team captain
- (S) Suspended
- (I) Ineligible
- (W) Walk-on
- Injured
- Current redshirt

Roster
Last update: March 23, 2012

== Schedule ==
Date time, TV	Rank^{#}	Opponent^{#}	Result	Record	Site (attendance) city, state
Exhibition
November 5, 2011*; 7:00 pm		UIndy	W 90–72	–	Assembly Hall (16,516); Bloomington, Indiana
Regular season
November 11, 2011*; 7:00 pm, BTN		Stony Brook	W 96–66	1–0	Assembly Hall (16,506); Bloomington, Indiana
November 13, 2011*; 5:00 pm, BTN		Chattanooga; Hoosier Invitational	W 78–53	2–0	Assembly Hall (16,149); Bloomington, Indiana
November 16, 2011*; 8:00 pm, ESPN3		at Evansville	W 94–73	3–0	Ford Center (9,640); Evansville, Indiana
November 19, 2011*; 8:00 pm, BTN		Savannah State; Hoosier Invitational	W 94–65	4–0	Assembly Hall (16,613); Bloomington, Indiana
November 21, 2011*; 6:30 pm, BTN		Gardner–Webb; Hoosier Invitational	W 73–49	5–0	Assembly Hall (16,261); Bloomington, Indiana
November 27, 2011*; 7:00 pm, BTN		Butler; Hoosier Invitational	W 75–59	6–0	Assembly Hall (17,265); Bloomington, Indiana
November 30, 2011*; 7:15 pm, ESPN2		at NC State; ACC – Big Ten Challenge	W 86–75	7–0	RBC Center (16,597); Raleigh, North Carolina
December 4, 2011*; 4:30 pm		Stetson	W 84–50	8–0	Assembly Hall (16,821); Bloomington, Indiana
December 10, 2011*; 5:15 pm, ESPN		No. 1 Kentucky; Rivalry	W 73–72	9–0	Assembly Hall (17,472); Bloomington, Indiana
December 17, 2011*; 4:30 pm, ESPN2	No. 18	vs. Notre Dame; Close the Gap Crossroads Classic	W 69–58	10–0	Conseco Fieldhouse (19,064); Indianapolis
December 19, 2011*; 6:30 pm, BTN	No. 17	Howard	W 107–50	11–0	Assembly Hall (11,111); Bloomington, Indiana
December 22, 2011*; 6:00 pm, ESPN3	No. 17	UMBC	W 89–47	12–0	Assembly Hall (12,665); Bloomington, Indiana
Big Ten regular season
December 28, 2011; 7:30 pm, BTN	No. 13	at No. 16 Michigan State	L 65–80	12–1 (0–1)	Breslin Center (14,797); East Lansing, Michigan
December 31, 2011; 6:00 pm, ESPN2	No. 13	No. 2 Ohio State	W 74–70	13–1 (1–1)	Assembly Hall (17,472); Bloomington, Indiana
January 5, 2012; 9:00 pm, ESPN2	No. 12	No. 16 Michigan	W 73–71	14–1 (2–1)	Assembly Hall (16,020); Bloomington, Indiana
January 8, 2012; 12:00 pm, BTN	No. 12	at Penn State	W 88–82	15–1 (3–1)	Bryce Jordan Center (8,250); University Park, Pennsylvania
January 12, 2012; 8:00 pm, BTN	No. 7	Minnesota	L 74–77	15–2 (3–2)	Assembly Hall (17,373); Bloomington, Indiana
January 15, 2012; 4:30 pm, CBS	No. 7	at No. 5 Ohio State	L 63–80	15–3 (3–3)	Value City Arena (18,809); Columbus, Ohio
January 18, 2012; 7:00 pm, BTN	No. 11	at Nebraska	L 69–70	15–4 (3–4)	Bob Devaney Sports Center (10,438); Lincoln, Nebraska
January 22, 2012; 12:00 pm, BTN	No. 11	Penn State	W 73–54	16–4 (4–4)	Assembly Hall (17,248); Bloomington, Indiana
January 26, 2012; 9:00 pm, ESPN2	No. 16	at No. 25 Wisconsin	L 50–57	16–5 (4–5)	Kohl Center (17,230); Madison, Wisconsin
January 29, 2012; 6:00 pm, BTN	No. 16	Iowa	W 103–89	17–5 (5–5)	Assembly Hall (17,243); Bloomington, Indiana
February 1, 2012; 6:30 pm, BTN	No. 20	at No. 23 Michigan	L 56–68	17–6 (5–6)	Crisler Arena (12,721); Ann Arbor, Michigan
February 4, 2012; 7:00 pm, BTN	No. 20	at Purdue; Rivalry/Crimson and Gold Cup	W 78–61	18–6 (6–6)	Mackey Arena (15,108); West Lafayette, Indiana
February 9, 2012; 8:00 pm, BTN	No. 23	Illinois; Rivalry	W 84–71	19–6 (7–6)	Assembly Hall (17,389); Bloomington, Indiana
February 15, 2012; 6:30 pm, BTN	No. 18	Northwestern	W 71–66	20–6 (8–6)	Assembly Hall (17,246); Bloomington, Indiana
February 19, 2012; 6:00 pm, BTN	No. 18	at Iowa	L 66–78	20–7 (8–7)	Carver–Hawkeye Arena (13,282); Iowa City, IA
February 22, 2012*; 7:00 pm	No. 23	North Carolina Central	W 75–56	21–7	Assembly Hall (17,164); Bloomington, Indiana
February 26, 2012; 1:00 pm, ESPN	No. 23	at Minnesota	W 69–50	22–7 (9–7)	Williams Arena (11,421); Minneapolis
February 28, 2012; 7:00 pm, ESPN	No. 18	No. 5 Michigan State	W 70–55	23–7 (10–7)	Assembly Hall (17,280); Bloomington, Indiana
March 4, 2012; 6:00 pm, BTN	No. 18	Purdue; Rivalry/Crimson and Gold Cup	W 85–74	24–7 (11–7)	Assembly Hall (17,472); Bloomington, Indiana
Big Ten Conference tournament
March 8, 2012; 2:00 pm, BTN	No. 15	vs. Penn State; First Round	W 75–58	25–7	Bankers Life Fieldhouse (17,936); Indianapolis
March 9, 2012; 2:30 pm, ESPN	No. 15	vs. No. 14 Wisconsin; Quarterfinals	L 71–79	25–8	Bankers Life Fieldhouse (18,484); Indianapolis
2012 NCAA tournament
March 15, 2012*; 9:45 pm, CBS	No. 16 (S 4)	vs. (S 13) New Mexico State; Second Round	W 79–66	26–8	Rose Garden (17,519); Portland, Oregon
March 17, 2012*; 7:10 pm, TBS	No. 16 (S 4)	vs. (S 12) VCU; Third Round	W 63–61	27–8	Rose Garden (17,337); Portland, Oregon
March 23, 2012*; 9:45 pm, CBS	No. 16 (S 4)	vs. No. 1 (S 1) Kentucky; Sweet Sixteen/Rivalry	L 90–102	27–9	Georgia Dome (24,731); Atlanta, Georgia
*Non-conference game. ^{#}Rankings from AP Poll. (#) Tournament seedings in parentheses. All times are in Eastern Time. (#) during NCAA Tournament is seed with Region.

== Rankings ==
Regular season polls
Poll	Pre- season	Week 1	Week 2	Week 3	Week 4	Week 5	Week 6	Week 7	Week 8	Week 9	Week 10	Week 11	Week 12	Week 13	Week 14	Week 15	Week 16	Week 17	Week 18	Week 19	Final
AP	NR	NR	NR	NR	RV	RV	18	17	13	12	7	11	16	20	23	18	23	18	15	16	
Coaches	NR	NR	NR	RV	RV	RV	20	18	15	12	8	13	17	20	23	20	24	20	15	17	13

Legend
	Increase in ranking
	Decrease in ranking
	No change
(RV)	Received votes

== 2012 recruiting class ==
College recruiting
Name	Hometown	School	Height	Weight	Commit date
Yogi Ferrell; PG	Indianapolis	Park Tudor	6 ft 0 in (1.83 m)	173 lb (78 kg)	Nov 24, 2010
Yogi Ferrell; PG	Recruit ratings: Scout: Rivals: (96)				
Ron Patterson; SG	Indianapolis	Broad Ripple	6 ft 3 in (1.91 m)	188 lb (85 kg)	Aug 15, 2010
Ron Patterson; SG	Recruit ratings: Scout: Rivals: (91)				
Jeremy Hollowell; SF	Indianapolis, Indiana	Lawrence Central	6 ft 7 in (2.01 m)	205 lb (93 kg)	Mar 24, 2011
Jeremy Hollowell; SF	Recruit ratings: Scout: Rivals: (95)				
Hanner Mosquera-Perea; PF	La Porte, Indiana	La Lumiere	6 ft 8 in (2.03 m)	200 lb (91 kg)	Oct 31, 2010
Hanner Mosquera-Perea; PF	Recruit ratings: Scout: Rivals: (93)				
Peter Jurkin; C	Charlotte, N.C.	United Faith Christian Academy	7 ft 0 in (2.13 m)	218 lb (99 kg)	Aug 9, 2010
Peter Jurkin; C	Recruit ratings: Scout: Rivals: (89)				
Overall recruit ranking: Scout: 3 Rivals: 2
Note: In many cases, Scout, Rivals, 247Sports, On3, and ESPN may conflict in their listings of height and weight.; In these cases, the average was taken. ESPN grades are on a 100-point scale.; Sources: "2012 Team Ranking". Rivals.
