= 2012 Big Ten men's basketball tournament =

- Classification: Division I
- Season: 2011–12
- Teams: 12
- Site: Bankers Life Fieldhouse; Indianapolis, Indiana
- Champions: Michigan State (3rd title)
- Winning coach: Tom Izzo (3rd title)
- MVP: Draymond Green (Michigan State)
- Attendance: 107,737
- Television: BTN, ESPN, ESPN2, and CBS

2011–12 Big Ten Conference men's basketball standings
	Conf.				Overall
Team	W		L	PCT	W		L	PCT
No. 5 Michigan State†	13	–	5	.722	29	–	8	.784
No. 13 Michigan	13	–	5	.722	24	–	10	.706
No. 7 Ohio State	13	–	5	.722	31	–	8	.795
No. 14 Wisconsin	12	–	6	.667	26	–	10	.722
No. 16 Indiana	11	–	7	.611	27	–	9	.750
Purdue	10	–	8	.556	22	–	13	.629
Northwestern	8	–	10	.444	19	–	14	.576
Iowa	8	–	10	.444	18	–	17	.514
Illinois	6	–	12	.333	17	–	15	.531
Minnesota	6	–	12	.333	23	–	15	.605
Nebraska	4	–	14	.222	12	–	18	.400
Penn State	4	–	14	.222	12	–	20	.375
† 2012 Big Ten tournament winner Rankings from AP poll

The 2012 Big Ten men's basketball tournament was held from March 8 through March 11 at Bankers Life Fieldhouse in Indianapolis. This was the first tournament to feature 12 teams of the expanded Big Ten, with Nebraska making its debut. The tournament was the fifteenth annual Big Ten men's basketball tournament. The championship was won by Michigan State who defeated Ohio State in the championships game. As a result, Michigan State received the Big Ten's automatic bid to the NCAA tournament. The win marked Michigan State's third tournament championship and first since 2000.

== Seeds ==
All Big Ten schools played in the tournament. Teams were seeded by conference record, with a tiebreaker system used to seed teams with identical conference records. Seeding for the tournament was determined at the close of the regular conference season. A new tie-breaking procedure was announced for the 2012 tournament for teams with identical conference records. The top 4 teams received a first-round bye.

Seed	School	Conf	Tiebreaker 1	Tiebreaker 2	Tiebreaker 3	Tiebreaker 4
1	Michigan St.	13–5	2–2 vs Mich, OSU	2–0 vs Wis	1–1 vs Ind	2–0 vs Pur
2	Michigan	13–5	2–2 vs MSU, OSU	1–0 vs Wis	1–1 vs Ind	1–1 vs Pur
3	Ohio St.	13–5	2–2 vs MSU, Mich	1–1 vs Wis		
4	Wisconsin	12–6				
5	Indiana	11–7				
6	Purdue	10–8				
7	Northwestern	8–10	2–0 vs Iowa			
8	Iowa	8–10	0–2 vs NW			
9	Illinois	6–12	1–1 vs Minn	2–3 vs MSU, Mich, OSU		
10	Minnesota	6–12	1–1 vs Ill	0–4 vs MSU, Mich, OSU		
11	Nebraska	4–14	1–1 vs PSU	0–5 vs MSU, Mich, OSU	0–2 vs Wis	1–0 vs Ind
12	Penn St.	4–14	1–1 vs Neb	0–4 vs MSU, Mich, OSU	0–2 vs Wis	0–2 vs Ind

== Schedule ==
Session	Game	Time*	Matchup^{#}	Television	Score	attendance
First round - Thursday, March 8
1	1	11:30am	No. 8 Iowa vs. No. 9 Illinois	BTN	64–61	17,936
1	2	2:00pm	No. 5 Indiana vs. No. 12 Penn State	BTN	75–58	17,936
2	3	5:30pm	No. 7 Northwestern vs. No. 10 Minnesota	ESPN2	75–68 OT	17,257
2	4	8:00pm	No. 6 Purdue vs. No. 11 Nebraska	ESPN2	79–61	17,257
Quarterfinals - Friday, March 9
3	5	12:00pm	No. 1 Michigan State vs. No. 8 Iowa	ESPN	92–75	18,484
3	6	2:30pm	No. 4 Wisconsin vs. No. 5 Indiana	ESPN	79–71	18,484
4	7	6:30pm	No. 2 Michigan vs. No. 10 Minnesota	BTN	73–69 OT	18,484
4	8	9:00pm	No. 3 Ohio State vs. No. 6 Purdue	BTN	88–71	18,484
Semifinals - Saturday, March 10
5	9	1:40pm	No. 1 Michigan State vs. No. 4 Wisconsin	CBS	65–52	18,451
5	10	4:05pm	No. 2 Michigan vs. No. 3 Ohio State	CBS	77–55	18,451
Championship - Sunday, March 11
6	11	3:30pm	No. 1 Michigan State vs. No. 3 Ohio State	CBS	68–64	17,125
*Game times in Eastern Time. #-Rankings denote tournament seeding.

Attendance figures; Total Tournament Attendance:107,737

== Bracket ==
First round Thursday, March 8 ESPN2/BTN
8	Iowa	64
9	Illinois	61
5	Indiana	75
12	Penn State	58
7	Northwestern	68
10	Minnesota	75^{OT}
6	Purdue	79
11	Nebraska	61

Quarterfinals; Friday, March 9 ESPN/BTN
1	#8 Michigan State	92
8	Iowa	75
4	#14 Wisconsin	79
5	#15 Indiana	71
2	#10 Michigan	73^{OT}
10	Minnesota	69
3	#7 Ohio State	88
6	Purdue	71

Semifinals; Saturday, March 10; CBS
1	#8 Michigan State	65
4	#14 Wisconsin	52
2	#10 Michigan	55
3	#7 Ohio State	77

Championship; Sunday, March 11; CBS
1	#8 Michigan State	68
3	#7 Ohio State	64

== Honors ==
=== All-Tournament Team ===
- Draymond Green, Michigan State – Big Ten tournament Most Outstanding Player
- Brandon Wood, Michigan State
- Andre Hollins, Minnesota
- Jared Sullinger, Ohio State
- Deshaun Thomas, Ohio State

== Tournament notes ==
- For the third year in a row, the No. 1 seed won the Big Ten tournament, but this would be the last time for years to come.
- There were only two upsets in this tournament, the biggest being No. 10 seed, Minnesota, over No. 7 seed, Northwestern.
