= 2011–12 Northwestern Wildcats men's basketball team =

American college basketball season

2011–12 Northwestern Wildcats men's basketball

Charleston Classic Champions

NIT, Second Round
- Conference: Big Ten Conference
- Record: 19–14 (8–10 Big Ten)
- Head coach: Bill Carmody
- Assistant coaches: Fred Hill; Tavaras Hardy; Ivan Vujic
- Home arena: Welsh-Ryan Arena

2011–12 Big Ten Conference men's basketball standings
	Conf.				Overall
Team	W		L	PCT	W		L	PCT
No. 5 Michigan State†	13	–	5	.722	29	–	8	.784
No. 13 Michigan	13	–	5	.722	24	–	10	.706
No. 7 Ohio State	13	–	5	.722	31	–	8	.795
No. 14 Wisconsin	12	–	6	.667	26	–	10	.722
No. 16 Indiana	11	–	7	.611	27	–	9	.750
Purdue	10	–	8	.556	22	–	13	.629
Northwestern	8	–	10	.444	19	–	14	.576
Iowa	8	–	10	.444	18	–	17	.514
Illinois	6	–	12	.333	17	–	15	.531
Minnesota	6	–	12	.333	23	–	15	.605
Nebraska	4	–	14	.222	12	–	18	.400
Penn State	4	–	14	.222	12	–	20	.375
† 2012 Big Ten tournament winner Rankings from AP poll

The 2011–12 Northwestern Wildcats men's basketball team represented Northwestern University in the 2011–12 college basketball season. This was head coach Bill Carmody's twelfth season at the Northwestern. The Wildcats were members of the Big Ten Conference and played their home games at Welsh-Ryan Arena. They finished the season with 19–14 overall, 8–10 in Big Ten play, finished in a tie with Iowa in 7th place. The team concluded the postseason for the 2012 Big Ten Conference men's basketball tournament, where they were defeated by Minnesota in the first round. They were invited to the NIT, where they beat Akron in the first round, and they lost to Washington in the second round.

== 2011–12 Roster ==
No.	Name	Position	Ht.	Wt.	Year	Hometown/High School
0	Alejandro Carter	G	6–3	208	FR	Chicago, Illinois/Morgan Park
1	Drew Crawford	G/F	6–5	210	JR	Naperville, Illinois/Naperville Central
3	Dave Sobolewski	G	6–1	185	FR	Naperville, Illinois/Benet Academy
4	Alex Marcotullio	G	6–3	180	JR	Warren, Michigan/De La Salle
10	Austin Nichols	G	6–0	190	JR	Lansing, Michigan/Lansing Catholic
11	Reggie Hearn	G	6–4	210	JR	Fort Wayne, Indiana/Snider High School
12	Luka Mirković	C	6–11	248	SR	Belgrade, Serbia/La Lumiere
14	Tre Demps	G	6–2	195	FR	San Antonio, Texas/Ronald Reagan High School
15	Nick Fruendt	G	6–5	205	SR	Batavia, Illinois/Batavia High School
23	JerShon Cobb	G	6–5	205	SO	Decatur, Georgia/Columbia High School
24	John Shurna	F	6–8	215	SR	Glen Ellyn, Illinois/Glenbard West
30	Davide Curletti	F	6–9	230	SR	Farmington Hills, Michigan/Orchard Lake St. Mary's
45	Nikola Cerina	F	6–9	245	JR	Topola, Serbia / Nikola Tesla Secondary School

== Schedule and results ==
Date time, TV	Rank^{#}	Opponent^{#}	Result	Record	Site (attendance) city, state
Exhibition
11/07/2011*; 7:00 pm		Robert Morris (Illinois)	W 99–48	–	Welsh-Ryan Arena (N/A); Evanston, IL
Regular season
11/13/2011*; 6:00 pm, BTN		Texas-Pan American	W 60–36	1–0	Welsh-Ryan Arena (3,613); Evanston, IL
11/17/2011*; 2:00 pm, ESPNU		vs. LSU; Charleston Classic First Round	W 88–82	2–0	TD Arena (2,532); Charleston, SC
11/18/2011*; 2:30 pm, ESPNU		vs. Tulsa; Charleston Classic Semifinals	W 69–65	3–0	TD Arena (1,711); Charleston, SC
11/20/2011*; 7:30 pm, ESPNU		vs. Seton Hall; Charleston Classic Championship	W 80–73	4–0	TD Arena (3,563); Charleston, SC
11/25/2011*; 12:00 pm		Stony Brook	W 63–58	5–0	Welsh-Ryan Arena (4,608); Evanston, IL
11/29/2011*; 6:15 pm, ESPNU		at Georgia Tech; ACC–Big Ten Challenge	W 76–60	6–0	Philips Arena (5,619); Atlanta, GA
12/02/2011*; 7:00 pm		Mississippi Valley State	W 92–67	7–0	Welsh-Ryan Arena (4,705); Evanston, IL
12/04/2011*; 3:00 pm, BTN		No. 7 Baylor	L 41–69	7–1	Welsh-Ryan Arena (6,316); Evanston, IL
12/15/2011*; 7:00 pm		Texas Southern	W 81–51	8–1	Welsh-Ryan Arena (4,905); Evanston, IL
12/17/2011*; 1:00 pm		Central Connecticut	W 70–64	9–1	Welsh-Ryan Arena (5,246); Evanston, IL
12/18/2011*; 5:00 pm, BTN		Eastern Illinois	W 87–72	10–1	Welsh-Ryan Arena (5,071); Evanston, IL
12/22/2011*; 7:05 pm		at No. 23 Creighton	L 79–87	10–2	CenturyLink Center (17,676); Omaha, NE
12/28/2011; 4:30 pm, BTN		at No. 2 Ohio State	L 54–87	10–3 (0–1)	Value City Arena (19,049); Columbus, OH
01/01/2012; 6:00 pm, ESPNU		Penn State	W 68–56	11–3 (1–1)	Welsh-Ryan Arena (5,389); Evanston, IL
01/04/2012; 6:00 pm, BTN		Illinois	L 56–57	11–4 (1–2)	Welsh-Ryan Arena (8,117); Evanston, IL
01/11/2012; 5:30 pm, BTN		at No. 13 Michigan	L 64–66 ^{OT}	11–5 (1–3)	Crisler Arena (12,605); Ann Arbor, MI
01/14/2012; 2:00 pm, BTN		No. 6 Michigan State	W 81–74	12–5 (2–3)	Welsh-Ryan Arena (8,117); Evanston, IL
01/18/2012; 8:00 pm, BTN		at Wisconsin	L 57–77	12–6 (2–4)	Kohl Center (16,939); Madison, WI
01/22/2012; 3:00 pm, BTN		at Minnesota	L 52–75	12–7 (2–5)	Williams Arena (12,219); Minneapolis, MN
01/28/2012; 3:00 pm, ESPN2		Purdue	L 56–58	12–8 (2–6)	Welsh-Ryan Arena (8,117); Evanston, IL
02/02/2012; 6:00 pm, ESPN2		Nebraska	W 84–74	13–8 (3–6)	Welsh-Ryan Arena (5,239); Evanston, IL
02/05/2012; 2:00 pm, BTN		at Illinois	W 74–70	14–8 (4–6)	Assembly Hall (15,461); Champaign, IL
02/09/2012; 8:00 pm, ESPNU		Iowa	W 83–64	15–8 (5–6)	Welsh-Ryan Arena (6,013); Evanston, IL
02/12/2012; 5:00 pm, BTN		at Purdue	L 77–87	15–9 (5–7)	Mackey Arena (14,155); West Lafayette, IN
02/15/2012; 5:30 pm, BTN		at No. 18 Indiana	L 66–71	15–10 (5–8)	Assembly Hall (17,246); Bloomington, IN
02/18/2012; 6:00 pm, BTN		Minnesota	W 64–53	16–10 (6–8)	Welsh-Ryan Arena (7,522); Evanston, IL
02/21/2012; 7:00 pm, BTN		No. 11 Michigan	L 55–67 ^{OT}	16–11 (6–9)	Welsh-Ryan Arena (8,117); Evanston, IL
02/25/2012; 8:00 pm, ESPNU		at Penn State	W 67–66	17–11 (7–9)	Bryce Jordan Center (8,513); University Park, PA
02/29/2012; 7:30 pm, BTN		No. 10 Ohio State	L 73–75	17–12 (7–10)	Welsh-Ryan Arena (8,117); Evanston, IL
03/03/2012; 1:30 pm, BTN		at Iowa	W 70–66	18–12 (8–10)	Carver-Hawkeye Arena (15,400); Iowa City, IA
Big Ten tournament
03/08/2012; 5:30 pm, ESPN2		vs. Minnesota; First Round	L 68–75 ^{OT}	18–13	Bankers Life Fieldhouse (17,257); Indianapolis, IN
National Invitation Tournament
03/13/2012*; 8:00 pm, ESPN2		Akron; First Round	W 76–74	19–13	Welsh-Ryan Arena (2,319); Evanston, IL
03/16/2012*; 9:00 pm, ESPNU		at Washington; Second Round	L 55–76	19–14	Alaska Airlines Arena (5,761); Seattle, WA
*Non-conference game. ^{#}Rankings from AP Poll. (#) Tournament seedings in parentheses. All times are in Central.
