= 2011–12 Purdue Boilermakers men's basketball team =

American college basketball season

2011–12 Purdue Boilermakers men's basketball

NCAA tournament, Round of 32
- Conference: Big Ten Conference
- Record: 22–13 (10–8 Big Ten)
- Head coach: Matt Painter (7th Season)
- Assistant coaches: Jack Owens; Micah Shrewsberry; Greg Gary
- Home arena: Mackey Arena

2011–12 Big Ten Conference men's basketball standings
| | Conf. | | | | Overall |
| Team | W | | L | PCT | W | | L | PCT |
|---|---|---|---|---|---|---|---|---|
| No. 5 Michigan State† | 13 | – | 5 | .722 | 29 | – | 8 | .784 |
| No. 13 Michigan | 13 | – | 5 | .722 | 24 | – | 10 | .706 |
| No. 7 Ohio State | 13 | – | 5 | .722 | 31 | – | 8 | .795 |
| No. 14 Wisconsin | 12 | – | 6 | .667 | 26 | – | 10 | .722 |
| No. 16 Indiana | 11 | – | 7 | .611 | 27 | – | 9 | .750 |
| Purdue | 10 | – | 8 | .556 | 22 | – | 13 | .629 |
| Northwestern | 8 | – | 10 | .444 | 19 | – | 14 | .576 |
| Iowa | 8 | – | 10 | .444 | 18 | – | 17 | .514 |
| Illinois | 6 | – | 12 | .333 | 17 | – | 15 | .531 |
| Minnesota | 6 | – | 12 | .333 | 23 | – | 15 | .605 |
| Nebraska | 4 | – | 14 | .222 | 12 | – | 18 | .400 |
| Penn State | 4 | – | 14 | .222 | 12 | – | 20 | .375 |
† 2012 Big Ten tournament winner Rankings from AP poll

The 2011–12 Purdue Boilermakers men's basketball team represented Purdue University. The head coach of the Boilermakers was Matt Painter, in his ninth season with the Boilers. The team played its home games in Mackey Arena in West Lafayette, Indiana, U.S., and was a member of the Big Ten Conference.

== Season notes ==
- On October 27, senior forward Robbie Hummel was named to the Preseason First Team All-Big Ten for the third time in his Purdue career.
- On November 11, newly renovated Mackey Arena was re-dedicated in conjunction with the team's game against Northern Illinois University. They won the game by 63 points, the program's highest win margin in 100 years.
- On March 5, senior forward Robbie Hummel was named First-Team All-Big Ten for the third time, making him only the 12th player in the history of the conference to be so honored three times and the first Boilermaker since Rick Mount.
- On March 5, senior point guard Lewis Jackson was named Honorable Mention All-Big Ten for a second year in a row.
- On March 5, junior DJ Byrd was named the Big Ten Sixth Man of the Year, as well as an Honorable Mention All-Big Ten.
- On three occasions, Purdue committed a school-record 3 turnovers, losing to Wisconsin, Indiana, and @ Ohio State.
- Purdue led the nation in turnovers per game, averaging 8.7 per contest.
- On March 3 in a regular season finale loss @ Indiana, Robbie Hummel scored his 1,720th career point, putting him at the ninth spot on the career scoring list at Purdue. He joined recruiting classmates E'Twaun Moore and JaJuan Johnson in the top ten.
- In conference play, Lewis Jackson led the Big Ten in assist/turnover margin.
- With 438 career assists at the culmination of the regular season, Lewis Jackson is only 5 short of Wisconsin's Jordan Taylor's 443 to lead the Big Ten amongst active players.
- Against Nebraska in the Big Ten tournament on March 8, Purdue tallied their 258th three-point field goal on the season, setting a program single-season record.

== Roster ==
2011–12 Purdue Boilermakers men's basketball team
Players
Coaches

| Pos. | # | Name | Height | Weight | Year | Hometown |
|---|---|---|---|---|---|---|
| G | 0 | Terone Johnson | 6 ft 2 in (1.88 m) | 207 lb (94 kg) | So | Indianapolis |
| G | 1 | Anthony Johnson | 6 ft 3 in (1.91 m) | 179 lb (81 kg) | RS Fr | Chicago |
| F | 4 | Robbie Hummel (C) | 6 ft 8 in (2.03 m) | 215 lb (98 kg) | RS Sr | Valparaiso, Indiana |
| G | 12 | Kelsey Barlow (S) | 6 ft 5 in (1.96 m) | 200 lb (91 kg) | Jr | Indianapolis |
| G | 14 | Dru Anthrop | 6 ft 0 in (1.83 m) | 181 lb (82 kg) | Jr | Lafayette, Indiana |
| F | 15 | Donnie Hale (redshirt) | 6 ft 8 in (2.03 m) | 212 lb (96 kg) | Fr | New Albany, Indiana |
| G/F | 21 | DJ Byrd | 6 ft 5 in (1.96 m) | 234 lb (106 kg) | Jr | Crawfordsville, Indiana |
| G | 23 | Lewis Jackson (C) | 5 ft 9 in (1.75 m) | 165 lb (75 kg) | Sr | Decatur, Illinois |
| G | 24 | Ryne Smith (C) | 6 ft 3 in (1.91 m) | 189 lb (86 kg) | Sr | Toledo, Ohio |
| F | 30 | Neal Beshears | 6 ft 6 in (1.98 m) | 187 lb (85 kg) | Fr | Winchester, Indiana |
| G | 32 | John Hart | 6 ft 2 in (1.88 m) | 205 lb (93 kg) | RS Jr | Beech Grove, Indiana |
| F | 34 | Jacob Lawson | 6 ft 8 in (2.03 m) | 218 lb (99 kg) | Fr | Reidsville, North Carolina |
| C | 50 | Travis Carroll | 6 ft 9 in (2.06 m) | 231 lb (105 kg) | So | Danville, Indiana |
| F | 55 | Sandi Marcius | 6 ft 9 in (2.06 m) | 257 lb (117 kg) | RS So | Nedelišće, Croatia |

Head coach

Matt Painter (Purdue)

Assistant coach(es)

Jack Owens (Eastern Illinois)
Micah Shrewsberry (Hanover)
Greg Gary (Tulane)

Legend

- (C) Team captain
- (S) Suspended
- (I) Ineligible
- (W) Walk-on
- Injured
- Current redshirt

Roster
Last update: February 23, 2012

=== Incoming recruits ===
College recruiting
| Name | Hometown | School | Height | Weight | Commit date |
|---|---|---|---|---|---|
| Donnie Hale; PF | New Albany, Indiana | New Albany Senior High School | 6 ft 7 in (2.01 m) | 190 lb (86 kg) | Jun 23, 2009 |
| Donnie Hale; PF | Recruit ratings: Scout: Rivals: (91) | | | | |
| Jacob Lawson; PF | Greensboro, North Carolina | Oak Ridge Military Academy | 6 ft 7 in (2.01 m) | 200 lb (91 kg) | Sep 2, 2010 |
| Jacob Lawson; PF | Recruit ratings: Scout: Rivals: (91) | | | | |
Overall recruit ranking:
Note: In many cases, Scout, Rivals, 247Sports, On3, and ESPN may conflict in their listings of height and weight.; In these cases, the average was taken. ESPN grades are on a 100-point scale.; Sources: "2011 Purdue Signees". Rivals.; "2011 Purdue Signees". Scout.; "2011 Purdue Signees". ESPN.; "Scout.com Team Recruiting Rankings". Scout.; "2011 Team Ranking". Rivals.

== Schedule ==
| Date time, TV | Rank^{#} | Opponent^{#} | Result | Record | Site (attendance) city, state |
Exhibition
| November 1, 2011*; 7:00 pm | | Northern State | W 78–46 | – | Mackey Arena (13,976); West Lafayette, Indiana |
| November 6, 2011*; 5:00 pm | | Southern Indiana | W 65–49 | – | Mackey Arena (14,364); West Lafayette, Indiana |
Regular Season
| November 11, 2011*; 7:00 pm | | Northern Illinois; Mackey Arena Re-Dedication Game | W 96–34 | 1–0 | Mackey Arena (14,719); West Lafayette, Indiana |
| November 14, 2011*; 7:30 pm, BTN | | High Point | W 67–65 | 2–0 | Mackey Arena (13,882); West Lafayette, Indiana |
| November 17, 2011*; 1:00 pm, ESPNU | | vs. Iona; Puerto Rico Tip-Off Quarterfinals | W 91–90 | 3–0 | Coliseo de Puerto Rico (5,322); San Juan, PR |
| November 18, 2011*; 1:00 pm, ESPNU | | vs. Temple; Puerto Rico Tip-Off semifinals | W 85–77 | 4–0 | Coliseo de Puerto Rico (N/A); San Juan, PR |
| November 20, 2011*; 8:00 pm, ESPN2 | | vs. No. 15 Alabama; Puerto Rico Tip-Off championship | L 56–65 | 4–1 | Coliseo de Puerto Rico (11,297); San Juan, PR |
| November 23, 2011*; 7:00 pm | | Western Michigan | W 80–37 | 5–1 | Mackey Arena (5,821); West Lafayette, Indiana |
| November 26, 2011*; 2:00 pm | | Coppin State | W 78–57 | 6–1 | Mackey Arena (9,662); West Lafayette, Indiana |
| November 29, 2011*; 9:00 pm, ESPN2 | | Miami; ACC–Big Ten Challenge | W 76–65 | 7–1 | Mackey Arena (13,927); West Lafayette, Indiana |
| December 3, 2011*; 3:00 pm, ESPNU | | at No. 11 Xavier | L 63–66 | 7–2 | Cintas Center (10,250); Cincinnati |
| December 7, 2011*; 7:30 pm, BTN | | Western Carolina | W 65–60 | 8–2 | Mackey Arena (13,904); West Lafayette, Indiana |
| December 10, 2011*; 4:00 pm, BTN | | Eastern Michigan | W 61–36 | 9–2 | Mackey Arena (14,318); West Lafayette, Indiana |
| December 17, 2011*; 2:00 pm, CBS | | vs. Butler; Crossroads Classic | L 65–67 | 9–3 | Conseco Fieldhouse (18,165); Indianapolis |
| December 20, 2011*; 6:30 pm, BTN | | IPFW | W 81–56 | 10–3 | Mackey Arena (10,056); West Lafayette, Indiana |
| December 28, 2011; 9:30 pm, BTN | | at Iowa | W 79–76 | 11–3 (1–0) | Carver–Hawkeye Arena (12,526); Iowa City, IA |
| December 31, 2011; 4:00 pm, ESPN2 | | Illinois | W 75–60 | 12–3 (2–0) | Mackey Arena (14,041); West Lafayette, Indiana |
| January 5, 2012; 8:00 pm, BTN | | at Penn State | L 45–65 | 12–4 (2–1) | Bryce Jordan Center (5,081); University Park, Pennsylvania |
| January 8, 2012; 6:00 pm, BTN | | at Minnesota | W 79–66 | 13–4 (3–1) | Williams Arena (11,761); Minneapolis |
| January 12, 2012; 7:00 pm, ESPN | | Wisconsin | L 62–67 | 13–5 (3–2) | Mackey Arena (14,620); West Lafayette, Indiana |
| January 17, 2012; 8:00 pm, BTN | | Iowa | W 75–68 | 14–5 (4–2) | Mackey Arena (14,134); West Lafayette, Indiana |
| January 21, 2012; 12:00 pm, ESPN | | at No. 9 Michigan State | L 58–83 | 14–6 (4–3) | Breslin Center (14,797); East Lansing, Michigan |
| January 24, 2012; 7:00 pm, ESPN | | No. 22 Michigan | L 64–66 | 14–7 (4–4) | Mackey Arena (14,533); West Lafayette, Indiana |
| January 28, 2012; 4:00 pm, ESPN2 | | at Northwestern | W 58–56 | 15–7 (5–4) | Welsh-Ryan Arena (8,117); Evanston, Illinois |
| February 4, 2012; 7:00 pm, BTN | | No. 20 Indiana | L 61–78 | 15–8 (5–5) | Mackey Arena (15,108); West Lafayette, Indiana |
| February 7, 2012; 9:00 pm, ESPN | | at No. 3 Ohio State | L 84–87 | 15–9 (5–6) | Value City Arena (16,504); Columbus, Ohio |
| February 12, 2012; 6:00 pm, BTN | | Northwestern | W 87–77 | 16–9 (6–6) | Mackey Arena (14,155); West Lafayette, Indiana |
| February 15, 2012; 8:30 pm, BTN | | at Illinois | W 67–62 | 17–9 (7–6) | Assembly Hall (14,339); Champaign, Illinois |
| February 19, 2012; 1:00 pm, CBS | | No. 8 Michigan State | L 62–76 | 17–10 (7–7) | Mackey Arena (14,736); West Lafayette, Indiana |
| February 22, 2012; 6:30 pm, BTN | | Nebraska | W 83–65 | 18–10 (8–7) | Mackey Arena (14,323); West Lafayette, Indiana |
| February 25, 2012; 6:00 pm, BTN | | at No. 11 Michigan | W 75–61 | 19–10 (9–7) | Crisler Arena (12,721); Ann Arbor, Michigan |
| February 29, 2012; 6:30 pm, BTN | | Penn State | W 80–56 | 20–10 (10–7) | Mackey Arena (14,565); West Lafayette, Indiana |
| March 4, 2012; 6:00 pm, BTN | | at No. 18 Indiana | L 74–85 | 20–11 (10–8) | Assembly Hall (17,472); Bloomington, Indiana |
Big Ten tournament
| March 8, 2012; 8:00 pm, ESPN2 | | vs. Nebraska; First Round | W 79–61 | 21–11 | Bankers Life Fieldhouse (N/A); Indianapolis |
| March 9, 2012; 8:55 pm, BTN | | vs. No. 7 Ohio State; Quarterfinals | L 71–88 | 21–12 | Bankers Life Fieldhouse (N/A); Indianapolis |
2012 NCAA tournament
| March 16, 2012*; 7:27 pm, truTV | No. (MW 10) | vs. No. 24 (MW 7) Saint Mary's; Second Round | W 72–69 | 22–12 | CenturyLink Center Omaha (16,833); Omaha, Nebraska |
| March 18, 2012*; 8:40 pm, TNT | No. (MW 10) | vs. No. 6 (MW 2) Kansas; Third Round | L 60–63 | 22–13 | CenturyLink Center Omaha (16,998); Omaha, Nebraska |
*Non-conference game. ^{#}Rankings from Coaches' Poll. (#) Tournament seedings in parentheses. All times are in Eastern Time.

== Rankings ==
Ranking movements Legend: ██ Increase in ranking ██ Decrease in ranking — = Not ranked RV = Received votes
| | Week | | | | | | | | | | | | | | | | | | | |
| Poll | Pre | 1 | 2 | 3 | 4 | 5 | 6 | 7 | 8 | 9 | 10 | 11 | 12 | 13 | 14 | 15 | 16 | 17 | 18 | Final |
|---|---|---|---|---|---|---|---|---|---|---|---|---|---|---|---|---|---|---|---|---|
| AP | RV | RV | RV | RV | RV | — | — | — | RV | — | — | — | — | — | — | — | RV | — | — | |
| Coaches | RV | RV | RV | RV | RV | RV | — | — | RV | — | — | — | — | — | — | — | — | — | — | |

Note: Purdue was seeded 37th by the NCAA Tournament selection committee.

== 2012 signing class ==
College recruiting
| Name | Hometown | School | Height | Weight | Commit date |
|---|---|---|---|---|---|
| Raphael Davis; SG | Fort Wayne, Indiana | La Lumiere School | 6 ft 5 in (1.96 m) | 200 lb (91 kg) | May 14, 2009 |
| Raphael Davis; SG | Recruit ratings: Scout: Rivals: (93) | | | | |
| AJ Hammons; C | Carmel, Indiana | Oak Hill Academy | 7 ft 0 in (2.13 m) | 275 lb (125 kg) | Oct 13, 2011 |
| AJ Hammons; C | Recruit ratings: Scout: Rivals: (93) | | | | |
| Ronnie Johnson; PG | Indianapolis | North Central High School | 5 ft 10 in (1.78 m) | 160 lb (73 kg) | May 2, 2011 |
| Ronnie Johnson; PG | Recruit ratings: Scout: Rivals: (93) | | | | |
| Jay Simpson; PF | Champaign, Illinois | La Lumiere School | 6 ft 9 in (2.06 m) | 235 lb (107 kg) | Nov 1, 2009 |
| Jay Simpson; PF | Recruit ratings: Scout: Rivals: (90) | | | | |
Overall recruit ranking: ESPN: 9
Note: In many cases, Scout, Rivals, 247Sports, On3, and ESPN may conflict in their listings of height and weight.; In these cases, the average was taken. ESPN grades are on a 100-point scale.; Sources: "2012 Purdue Signees". Rivals.; "2012 Purdue Signees". Scout.; "2012 Purdue Signees". ESPN.; "Scout.com Team Recruiting Rankings". Scout.; "2012 Team Ranking". Rivals.

== See also ==
- 2012 NCAA Division I men's basketball tournament
- 2011–12 NCAA Division I men's basketball season
- 2011-12 NCAA Division I men's basketball rankings
- List of NCAA Division I institutions
