= 2011–12 Penn State Nittany Lions basketball team =

American college basketball season

2011–12 Penn State Nittany Lions men's basketball
- Conference: Big Ten Conference
- Record: 12–20 (4–14 Big Ten)
- Head coach: Pat Chambers
- Assistant coaches: Eugene Burroughs; Brian Daly; Keith Urgo
- Home arena: Bryce Jordan Center

2011–12 Big Ten Conference men's basketball standings
| | Conf. | | | | Overall |
| Team | W | | L | PCT | W | | L | PCT |
|---|---|---|---|---|---|---|---|---|
| No. 5 Michigan State† | 13 | – | 5 | .722 | 29 | – | 8 | .784 |
| No. 13 Michigan | 13 | – | 5 | .722 | 24 | – | 10 | .706 |
| No. 7 Ohio State | 13 | – | 5 | .722 | 31 | – | 8 | .795 |
| No. 14 Wisconsin | 12 | – | 6 | .667 | 26 | – | 10 | .722 |
| No. 16 Indiana | 11 | – | 7 | .611 | 27 | – | 9 | .750 |
| Purdue | 10 | – | 8 | .556 | 22 | – | 13 | .629 |
| Northwestern | 8 | – | 10 | .444 | 19 | – | 14 | .576 |
| Iowa | 8 | – | 10 | .444 | 18 | – | 17 | .514 |
| Illinois | 6 | – | 12 | .333 | 17 | – | 15 | .531 |
| Minnesota | 6 | – | 12 | .333 | 23 | – | 15 | .605 |
| Nebraska | 4 | – | 14 | .222 | 12 | – | 18 | .400 |
| Penn State | 4 | – | 14 | .222 | 12 | – | 20 | .375 |
† 2012 Big Ten tournament winner Rankings from AP poll

The 2011–12 Penn State Nittany Lions men's basketball team represented Pennsylvania State University. Head coach Pat Chambers was in his first season with the team. The team played its home games in University Park, Pennsylvania, US at the Bryce Jordan Center (which has a capacity of 15,000) for the thirteenth consecutive season. They finished with a record of 12–20 overall, 4–14 in Big Ten play for a tied for a last place finish with Nebraska. They lost in the lost in the first round of the 2012 Big Ten Conference men's basketball tournament by Indiana.

== Coaching staff ==
| Position | Name | Year | Alma mater |
|---|---|---|---|
| Head coach | Pat Chambers | 2011 | Philadelphia (1994) |
| Associate head coach | Eugene Burroughs | 2011 | Richmond (1994) |
| Assistant coach | Brian Daly | 2011 | Saint Joseph's (1992) |
| Assistant coach | Keith Urgo | 2011 | Fairfield (2002) |
| Director of Basketball Operations | Ross Condon | 2011 | Villanova (2007) |
| Video coordinator | Adam Fisher | 2011 | Penn State (2006) |
| Strength and conditioning coach | Brad Pantall | 2006 | Penn State (1996) |
| Athletic trainer | Jon Salazer | 2001 | Penn State (1993) |
| On Campus Recruiting Coordinator | David Caporaletti | 2011 | Philadelphia University (1993) |
| Graduate Manager | Brendan Smith | 2011 | Penn State (2011) |

== Roster ==
| Name | No. | Position | Height | Weight | Year | Home town |
|---|---|---|---|---|---|---|
| D. J. Newbill | 2 | Guard | 6–4 | 210 | Sophomore | Philadelphia, PA |
| Trey Lewis | 3 | Guard | 6–1 | 180 | Freshman | Garfield Heights, OH |
| Matt Glover | 5 | Guard | 6–4 | 210 | Sophomore | Orange, CA |
| Jermaine Marshall | 11 | Guard | 6–4 | 200 | RS sophomore | Etters, PA |
| Kevin Montminy | 14 | Guard | 6–3 | 185 | Freshman | Centre Hall, PA |
| Nick Colella | 20 | Guard | 6–3 | 195 | Junior | New Castle, PA |
| Sasa Borovnjak | 21 | Forward | 6–9 | 235 | RS sophomore | Belgrade, Serbia |
| Tim Frazier | 23 | Guard | 6–1 | 170 | Junior | Houston, TX |
| Cammeron Woodyard | 24 | Guard | 6–5 | 210 | Senior | Westminster, MD |
| Jonathan Graham | 25 | Forward | 6–8 | 240 | Freshman | Baltimore, MD |
| Patrick Ackerman | 32 | Forward | 6–11 | 230 | Freshman | Rutland, MA |
| Alan Wisniewski | 34 | Forward | 6–9 | 230 | Sophomore | Sterling Heights, MI |
| Billy Oliver | 35 | Forward | 6–8 | 230 | RS junior | Chatham, NJ |
| Ross Travis | 43 | Forward | 6–6 | 220 | Freshman | Chaska, MN |
| Peter Alexis | 52 | Forward | 6–10 | 255 | Freshman | Wilkes-Barre, PA |

== Schedule and results ==
| Date time, TV | Rank^{#} | Opponent^{#} | Result | Record | Site (attendance) city, state |
Exhibition
| Nov 5*; 4:00 p.m. | | Slippery Rock | W 64–47 | — | Bryce Jordan Center (7,746); University Park, PA |
Regular season
| Nov 12*; 4:30 p.m. | | Hartford | W 70–55 | 1–0 | Bryce Jordan Center (4,152); University Park, PA |
| Nov 14*; 7:00 p.m. | | Radford; Hall of Fame Tip Off | W 62–46 | 2–0 | Bryce Jordan Center (4,916); University Park, PA |
| Nov 16*; 7:00 p.m. | | Long Island; Hall of Fame Tip Off | W 77–68 | 3–0 | Bryce Jordan Center (5,258); University Park, PA |
| Nov 19*; 12:00 p.m., ESPN3 | | vs. No. 2 Kentucky; Hall of Fame Tip Off semifinal | L 47–85 | 3–1 | Mohegan Sun Arena (2,500); Uncasville, CT |
| Nov 20*; 2:30 p.m., ESPN3 | | vs. South Florida; Hall of Fame Tip Off 3rd place game | W 53–49 | 4–1 | Mohegan Sun Arena (4,755); Uncasville, CT |
| Nov 23*; 7:00 p.m. | | Youngstown State | W 82–71 | 5–1 | Bryce Jordan Center (4,461); University Park, PA |
| Nov 26*; 3:30 p.m. | | at Saint Joseph's | L 47–65 | 5–2 | Hagan Arena (4,200); Philadelphia, PA |
| Nov 30*; 7:15 p.m., ESPNU | | at Boston College; ACC – Big Ten Challenge | W 62–54 | 6–2 | Conte Forum (4,326); Chestnut Hill, MA |
| Dec 4*; 6:00 p.m., BTN | | Ole Miss | L 70–72 | 6–3 | Bryce Jordan Center (6,001); University Park, PA |
| Dec 7*; 7:00 p.m. | | Lafayette | L 57–61 | 6–4 | Bryce Jordan Center (5,462); University Park, PA |
| Dec 10*; 7:00 p.m. | | at Duquesne | L 59–66 | 6–5 | CONSOL Energy Center (7,046); Pittsburgh, PA |
| Dec 18*; 4:00 p.m., BTN | | Mount St. Mary's | W 72–43 | 7–5 | Bryce Jordan Center (7,202); University Park, PA |
| Dec 21*; 7:30 p.m., BTN | | Cornell | W 74–67 | 8–5 | Bryce Jordan Center (4,414); University Park, PA |
| Dec 29; 7:30 p.m., BTN | | at No. 18 Michigan | L 53–71 | 8–6 (0–1) | Crisler Arena (12,751); Ann Arbor, MI |
| Jan 1; 7:00 p.m., ESPNU | | at Northwestern | L 56–68 | 8–7 (0–2) | Welsh-Ryan Arena (5,389); Evanston, IL |
| Jan 5; 8:00 p.m., BTN | | Purdue | W 65–45 | 9–7 (1–2) | Bryce Jordan Center (5,081); University Park, PA |
| Jan 8; 12:00 p.m., BTN | | No. 12 Indiana | L 82–88 | 9–8 (1–3) | Bryce Jordan Center (8,200); University Park, PA |
| Jan 11; 8:30 p.m., BTN | | at Nebraska | L 58–70 | 9–9 (1–4) | Bob Devaney Sports Center (10,791); Lincoln, NE |
| Jan 15; 4:00 p.m., BTN | | Minnesota | L 66–80 | 9–10 (1–5) | Bryce Jordan Center (9,065); University Park, PA |
| Jan 19; 9:00 p.m., ESPN2 | | No. 22 Illinois | W 54–52 | 10–10 (2–5) | Bryce Jordan Center (6,945); University Park, PA |
| Jan 22; 12:00 p.m., BTN | | at No. 11 Indiana | L 54–73 | 10–11 (2–6) | Assembly Hall (17,248); Bloomington, IN |
| Jan 25; 6:30 p.m., BTN | | at No. 4 Ohio State | L 54–78 | 10–12 (2–7) | Value City Arena (16,907); Columbus, OH |
| Jan 31; 8:00 p.m., BTN | | No. 19 Wisconsin | L 46–52 | 10–13 (2–8) | Bryce Jordan Center (8,752); University Park, PA |
| Feb 4; 3:00 p.m., ESPNU | | at Iowa | L 64–77 | 10–14 (2–9) | Carver-Hawkeye Arena (13,510); Iowa City, IA |
| Feb 8; 6:30 p.m., BTN | | at No. 11 Michigan State | L 57–77 | 10–15 (2–10) | Breslin Center (14,797); East Lansing, MI |
| Feb 11; 1:00 p.m., ESPNU | | Nebraska | W 67–51 | 11–15 (3–10) | Bryce Jordan Center (13,103); University Park, PA |
| Feb 16; 8:00 p.m., ESPNU | | Iowa | W 69–64 | 12–15 (4–10) | Bryce Jordan Center (6,794); University Park, PA |
| Feb 19; 4:00 p.m., BTN | | at No. 15 Wisconsin | L 55–65 | 12–16 (4–11) | Kohl Center (17,230); Madison, WI |
| Feb 25; 9:00 p.m., ESPNU | | Northwestern | L 66–67 | 12–17 (4–12) | Bryce Jordan Center (8,513); University Park, PA |
| Feb 29; 6:30 p.m., BTN | | at Purdue | L 56–80 | 12–18 (4–13) | Mackey Arena (14,565); West Lafayette, IN |
| Mar 4; 1:00 p.m., ESPN | | No. 13 Michigan | L 65–71 | 12–19 (4–14) | Bryce Jordan Center (9,564); University Park, PA |
Big Ten tournament
| Mar 8; 2:00 p.m., BTN | | vs. No. 15 Indiana; First round | L 58–75 | 12–20 | Bankers Life Fieldhouse (17,936); Indianapolis, IN |
*Non-conference game. ^{#}Rankings from AP Poll. (#) Tournament seedings in parentheses. All times are in Eastern Time.
