= 2011–12 Nebraska Cornhuskers men's basketball team =

American college basketball season

2011–12 Nebraska Cornhuskers men's basketball
- Conference: Big Ten Conference
- Record: 12–18 (4–14 Big Ten)
- Head coach: Doc Sadler (6th Season)
- Assistant coaches: Wes Flanigan; David Anwar; Jeremy Cox
- Home arena: Bob Devaney Sports Center

2011–12 Big Ten Conference men's basketball standings
	Conf.				Overall
Team	W		L	PCT	W		L	PCT
No. 5 Michigan State†	13	–	5	.722	29	–	8	.784
No. 13 Michigan	13	–	5	.722	24	–	10	.706
No. 7 Ohio State	13	–	5	.722	31	–	8	.795
No. 14 Wisconsin	12	–	6	.667	26	–	10	.722
No. 16 Indiana	11	–	7	.611	27	–	9	.750
Purdue	10	–	8	.556	22	–	13	.629
Northwestern	8	–	10	.444	19	–	14	.576
Iowa	8	–	10	.444	18	–	17	.514
Illinois	6	–	12	.333	17	–	15	.531
Minnesota	6	–	12	.333	23	–	15	.605
Nebraska	4	–	14	.222	12	–	18	.400
Penn State	4	–	14	.222	12	–	20	.375
† 2012 Big Ten tournament winner Rankings from AP poll

The 2011–12 Nebraska Cornhuskers men's basketball team represented the University of Nebraska–Lincoln. The head coach was Doc Sadler, in his sixth season with the Cornhuskers. The team played their home games in Bob Devaney Sports Center in Lincoln, Nebraska, and were first-year members of the Big Ten Conference. They finished with a record of 12–18 overall, 4–14 in Big Ten play. They lost in the first round by Purdue of the 2012 Big Ten Conference men's basketball tournament. A day later, on March 9, 2012, the university announced Sadler's firing.

== Incoming Recruits ==
College recruiting
Name	Hometown	School	Height	Weight	Commit date
David Rivers; SF	Little Rock, AR	Hall High School	6 ft 6 in (1.98 m)	175 lb (79 kg)	Nov 5, 2010
David Rivers; SF	Recruit ratings: Scout: Rivals: (90)				
Corey Hilliard; PG	Raytown, MO	Raytown South High School	6 ft 1 in (1.85 m)	175 lb (79 kg)	Aug 6, 2010
Corey Hilliard; PG	Recruit ratings: Scout: Rivals: (88)				
Josiah Moore; SG	Lawrenceville, GA	Norcross High School	6 ft 5 in (1.96 m)	200 lb (91 kg)	Sep 11, 2010
Josiah Moore; SG	Recruit ratings: Scout: Rivals: (88)				
Dylan Talley; PG	Camden, NJ	Blinn College	6 ft 5 in (1.96 m)	215 lb (98 kg)	Apr 11, 2011
Dylan Talley; PG	Recruit ratings: Scout: Rivals:				
Overall recruit ranking:
Note: In many cases, Scout, Rivals, 247Sports, On3, and ESPN may conflict in their listings of height and weight.; In these cases, the average was taken. ESPN grades are on a 100-point scale.; Sources: "2011 Team Ranking". Rivals.

== Roster ==
2011–12 Nebraska Cornhuskers men's basketball team
Players
Coaches

Pos.	#	Name	Height	Weight	Year	Hometown
G	0	Toney McCray	6 ft 6 in (1.98 m)	215 lb (98 kg)	Sr	Missouri City, TX
G	2	David Rivers	6 ft 7 in (2.01 m)	174 lb (79 kg)	Fr	Little Rock, AR
G	3	Brandon Richardson	6 ft 0 in (1.83 m)	190 lb (86 kg)	Sr	Los Angeles, CA
G	5	Josiah Moore	6 ft 5 in (1.96 m)	200 lb (91 kg)	Fr	Norcross, GA
G	10	Trevor Menke	5 ft 11 in (1.8 m)	172 lb (78 kg)	RS Fr	Beatrice, NE
F	11	Jordan Tyrance	6 ft 3 in (1.91 m)	195 lb (88 kg)	RS Fr	Lincoln, NE
G	12	Corey Hilliard	6 ft 1 in (1.85 m)	183 lb (83 kg)	Fr	Kansas City, MO
F	13	Brandon Ubel	6 ft 10 in (2.08 m)	235 lb (107 kg)	Jr	Overland Park, KS
C	14	Christopher Niemann	6 ft 11 in (2.11 m)	275 lb (125 kg)	Jr	Kühlungsborn, GER
G	15	Ray Gallegos	6 ft 2 in (1.88 m)	176 lb (80 kg)	Jr	Salt Lake City, UT
C	21	Brian Jorge Diaz	6 ft 11 in (2.11 m)	244 lb (111 kg)	Jr	Caguas, PR
G	23	Bo Spence	6 ft 2 in (1.88 m)	196 lb (89 kg)	RS Sr	Baton Rouge, LA
G	24	Dylan Talley	6 ft 5 in (1.96 m)	214 lb (97 kg)	Jr	Camden, NJ
G	25	Caleb Walker	6 ft 4 in (1.93 m)	205 lb (93 kg)	Sr	Hutchinson, KS
C	32	Andre Almeida	6 ft 11 in (2.11 m)	310 lb (141 kg)	Sr	São Paulo, BRA
F	33	Mike Fox	6 ft 4 in (1.93 m)	195 lb (88 kg)	Jr	Beatrice, NE
C	44	Kye Kurkowski	6 ft 10 in (2.08 m)	212 lb (96 kg)	RS Fr	Grant, NE

Head coach

- Doc Sadler (Arkansas)

Assistant coach(es)

- Wes Flanigan (Auburn)
- David Anwar (Fitchburg State)
- Jeremy Cox (Colorado Mesa)

Legend

- (C) Team captain
- (S) Suspended
- (I) Ineligible
- (W) Walk-on
- Injured
- Current redshirt

Roster
Last update: 2011-11-20

== Schedule ==
Date time, TV	Rank^{#}	Opponent^{#}	Result	Record	Site (attendance) city, state
Exhibition
11/07/2011*; 7:00 pm		Doane	W 76–54	–	Bob Devaney Sports Center (4,127); Lincoln, NE
Regular season
11/11/2011*; 7:00 pm		South Dakota	W 65–48	1–0	Bob Devaney Sports Center (8,854); Lincoln, NE
11/14/2011*; 9:30 pm, PT		at USC	W 64–61 ^{2OT}	2–0	Galen Center (3,412); Los Angeles, CA
11/20/2011*; 1:00 pm, BTN		Rhode Island	W 83–63	3–0	Bob Devaney Sports Center (9,279); Lincoln, NE
11/23/2011*; 8:00 pm, BTN		Oregon	L 76–83	3–1	Bob Devaney Sports Center (10,881); Lincoln, NE
11/26/2011*; 1:00 pm		South Dakota State	W 76–64	4–1	Bob Devaney Sports Center (9,107); Lincoln, NE
11/30/2011*; 8:15 pm, ESPNU		Wake Forest; ACC–Big Ten Challenge	L 53–55	4–2	Bob Devaney Sports Center (9,769); Lincoln, NE
12/04/2011*; 4:05 pm, KMTV		at Creighton; Rivalry	L 66–76	4–3	CenturyLink Center Omaha (16,561); Omaha, NE
12/07/2011*; 7:00 pm		Florida Gulf Coast	W 51–50	5–3	Bob Devaney Sports Center (5,489); Lincoln, NE
12/10/2011*; 7:00 pm, The Mtn.		at TCU	W 69–57	6–3	Daniel–Meyer Coliseum (5,577); Fort Worth, TX
12/17/2011*; 7:00 pm		Alcorn State	W 60–46	7–3	Bob Devaney Sports Center (8,922); Lincoln, NE
12/20/2011*; 6:30 pm		Central Michigan	W 72–69	8–3	Bob Devaney Sports Center (8,840); Lincoln, NE
12/27/2011; 8:00 pm, ESPN2		No. 11 Wisconsin	L 40–64	8–4 (0–1)	Bob Deavney Sports Center (11,422); Lincoln, NE
12/31/2011; 2:00 pm, BTN		No. 16 Michigan State	L 55–68	8–5 (0–2)	Bob Deavney Sports Center (13,595); Lincoln, NE
01/03/2012; 5:30 pm, BTN		at No. 6 Ohio State	L 40–71	8–6 (0–3)	Value City Arena (16,158); Columbus, OH
01/07/2012; 12:00 pm, BTN		at Illinois	L 54–59	8–7 (0–4)	Assembly Hall (14,909); Champaign, IL
01/11/2012; 7:30 pm, BTN		Penn State	W 70–58	9–7 (1–4)	Bob Deavney Sports Center (10,791); Lincoln, NE
01/15/2012; 5:00 pm, BTN		at Wisconsin	L 45–50	9–8 (1–5)	Kohl Center (17,173); Madison, WI
01/18/2012; 6:00 pm, BTN		No. 11 Indiana	W 70–69	10–8 (2–5)	Bob Devaney Sports Center (10,438); Lincoln, NE
01/21/2012; 7:00 pm, BTN		No. 5 Ohio State	L 45–79	10–9 (2–6)	Bob Deavney Sports Center (12,214); Lincoln, NE
01/26/2012; 6:00 pm, ESPNU		at Iowa	W 79–73	11–9 (3–6)	Carver–Hawkeye Arena (10,538); Iowa City, IA
02/02/2012; 6:00 pm, ESPN2		at Northwestern	L 74–84	11–10 (3–7)	Welsh-Ryan Arena (5,239); Evanston, IL
02/05/2012; 12:00 pm, BTN		Minnesota	L 61–69	11–11 (3–8)	Bob Devaney Sports Center (9,857); Lincoln, NE
02/08/2012; 7:30 pm, BTN		No. 22 Michigan	L 46–62	11–12 (3–9)	Bob Devaney Sports Center (9,533); Lincoln, NE
02/11/2012; 12:00 pm, ESPNU		at Penn State	L 51–67	11–13 (3–10)	Bryce Jordan Center (13,103); University Park, PA
02/18/2012; 4:00 pm, BTN		Illinois	W 80–57	12–13 (4–10)	Bob Devaney Sports Center (10,558); Lincoln, NE
02/22/2012; 5:30 pm, BTN		at Purdue	L 65–83	12–14 (4–11)	Mackey Arena (14,323); West Lafayette, IN
02/25/2012; 7:00 pm, BTN		at No. 6 Michigan State	L 34–62	12–15 (4–12)	Breslin Center (14,797); East Lansing, MI
02/29/2012; 8:00 pm, ESPNU		Iowa	L 53–62	12–16 (4–13)	Bob Devaney Sports Center (10,772); Lincoln, NE
03/03/2012; 11:30 am, BTN		at Minnesota	L 69–81	12–17 (4–14)	Williams Arena (11,262); Minneapolis, MN
Big Ten tournament
03/08/2012; 7:00 pm, ESPN2		vs. Purdue; First Round	L 61–79	12–18	Bankers Life Fieldhouse (N/A); Indianapolis, IN
*Non-conference game. ^{#}Rankings from Coaches' Poll. (#) Tournament seedings in parentheses. All times are in Central Time.
