= 2011–12 Wisconsin Badgers men's basketball team =

American college basketball season

2011–12 Wisconsin Badgers men's basketball

2011 Chicago Invitational Challenge Champions

NCAA tournament, Sweet Sixteen
- Conference: Big Ten Conference

Ranking
- Coaches: No. 12
- AP: No. 14
- Record: 26–10 (12–6 Big Ten)
- Head coach: Bo Ryan
- Associate head coach: Greg Gard
- Assistant coaches: Gary Close; Lamont Paris
- Home arena: Kohl Center

2011–12 Big Ten Conference men's basketball standings
	Conf.				Overall
Team	W		L	PCT	W		L	PCT
No. 5 Michigan State†	13	–	5	.722	29	–	8	.784
No. 13 Michigan	13	–	5	.722	24	–	10	.706
No. 7 Ohio State	13	–	5	.722	31	–	8	.795
No. 14 Wisconsin	12	–	6	.667	26	–	10	.722
No. 16 Indiana	11	–	7	.611	27	–	9	.750
Purdue	10	–	8	.556	22	–	13	.629
Northwestern	8	–	10	.444	19	–	14	.576
Iowa	8	–	10	.444	18	–	17	.514
Illinois	6	–	12	.333	17	–	15	.531
Minnesota	6	–	12	.333	23	–	15	.605
Nebraska	4	–	14	.222	12	–	18	.400
Penn State	4	–	14	.222	12	–	20	.375
† 2012 Big Ten tournament winner Rankings from AP poll

The 2011–12 Wisconsin Badgers men's basketball team represented University of Wisconsin–Madison in the 2011–12 NCAA Division I men's basketball season. This was coach Bo Ryan's eleventh season at the University of Wisconsin. They played their home games at the Kohl Center and are members of the Big Ten Conference. Wisconsin made it to the sweet 16, but lost to #1 seed Syracuse in the regional semifinals.

== 2011 Commitments ==
College recruiting information
Name	Hometown	School	Height	Weight	Commit date
Traevon Jackson; SG	Westerville, OH	Westerville South High School	6 ft 2 in (1.88 m)	190 lb (86 kg)	Jun 12, 2010
Traevon Jackson; SG	Recruit ratings: Scout: Rivals: ESPN: (88)				
Frank Kaminsky; C	Lisle, IL	Benet Academy	6 ft 10 in (2.08 m)	220 lb (100 kg)	Jun 12, 2010
Frank Kaminsky; C	Recruit ratings: Scout: Rivals: ESPN: (92)				
George Marshall; PG	Chicago, IL	Brooks College Prep	6 ft 0 in (1.83 m)	180 lb (82 kg)	Jan 19, 2010
George Marshall; PG	Recruit ratings: Scout: Rivals: ESPN: (88)				
Jordan Smith; SG	Long Lake, MN	Orono High School	6 ft 2 in (1.88 m)	180 lb (82 kg)	Dec 12, 2010
Jordan Smith; SG	Recruit ratings: Scout: Rivals: ESPN: (77)				
Jarrod Uthoff; PF	Cedar Rapids, IA	Jefferson High School	6 ft 8 in (2.03 m)	190 lb (86 kg)	Jul 19, 2010
Jarrod Uthoff; PF	Recruit ratings: Scout: Rivals: ESPN: (92)				
Overall recruit ranking:
Note: In many cases, Scout, Rivals, 247Sports, On3, and ESPN may conflict in their listings of height and weight.; In these cases, the average was taken. ESPN grades are on a 100-point scale.; Sources: "ESPN- Wisconsin Badgers Men's Basketball Recruiting". ESPN.; "2011 Team Ranking". Rivals.

== Season Notes ==
Jordan Taylor was Wisconsin's lone senior in their regular rotation, although fellow senior Rob Wilson earned a significant increase in postseason playing time following his shocking 30 point outburst in the Big Ten tournament. Ryan Evans and Jared Berggren were second and third in team scoring, 11.0 ppg and 10.5 ppg, respectively. Josh Gasser, Ben Brust, and Mike Bruesewitz were also key contributors.

There was a 3-way tie for the Big Ten regular season title with Michigan St, Michigan, and Ohio St all finishing 13-5. Wisconsin alone in 4th at 12-6.

Losing to Syracuse in the Sweet 16 in a close game, 63-64. Wisconsin had the ball in their leader's hands at the end of the game. But Jordan Taylor's 3-pointer at the buzzer came up empty.

== Awards ==
All-Big Ten by Media

- Jordan Taylor - 2nd team
- Jarred Berggren - Honorable mention
- Ryan Evans - Honorable mention

All-Big Ten by Coaches

- Jordan Taylor - 1st team
- Jarred Berggren - Honorable mention
- Ryan Evans - Honorable mention
- Josh Gasser - All-Defensive team

== Roster ==
2011–12 Wisconsin Badgers men's basketball team
Players
Coaches

Pos.	#	Name	Height	Weight	Year	Hometown
G	1	Ben Brust	6 ft 1 in (1.85 m)	190 lb (86 kg)	So	Hawthorn Woods, IL
G	2	Jordan Smith (W)	6 ft 1 in (1.85 m)	175 lb (79 kg)	Fr	Orono, MN
G	3	George Marshall (redshirt)	5 ft 11 in (1.8 m)	180 lb (82 kg)	Fr	Chicago, IL
G/F	5	Ryan Evans	6 ft 6 in (1.98 m)	210 lb (95 kg)	RS Jr	Phoenix, AZ
G	10	Dan Fahey (W)	6 ft 3 in (1.91 m)	195 lb (88 kg)	Jr	Chicago, IL
G	11	Jordan Taylor	6 ft 1 in (1.85 m)	195 lb (88 kg)	Sr	Bloomington, MN
G	12	Traevon Jackson	6 ft 2 in (1.88 m)	215 lb (98 kg)	Fr	Westerville, OH
F	13	Duje Dukan	6 ft 8 in (2.03 m)	205 lb (93 kg)	So	Deerfield, IL
G	21	Josh Gasser	6 ft 3 in (1.91 m)	190 lb (86 kg)	So	Port Washington, WI
G	22	J. D. Wise (W)	6 ft 0 in (1.83 m)	185 lb (84 kg)	Jr	Milwaukee, WI
F	30	Jarrod Uthoff (redshirt)	6 ft 8 in (2.03 m)	200 lb (91 kg)	Fr	Cedar Rapids, IA
F	31	Mike Bruesewitz	6 ft 6 in (1.98 m)	222 lb (101 kg)	Jr	St. Paul, MN
C	32	Evan Anderson	6 ft 10 in (2.08 m)	260 lb (118 kg)	RS Fr	Stanley, WI
G/F	33	Rob Wilson	6 ft 4 in (1.93 m)	200 lb (91 kg)	Sr	Cleveland, OH
F	34	Zach Bohannon (W I) (redshirt)	6 ft 6 in (1.98 m)	210 lb (95 kg)	Jr	Marion, IA
F/C	40	Jared Berggren	6 ft 10 in (2.08 m)	235 lb (107 kg)	RS Jr	Princeton, MN
F	44	Frank Kaminsky	6 ft 11 in (2.11 m)	230 lb (104 kg)	Fr	Lisle, IL

Head coach

- Bo Ryan (Wilkes)

Assistant coach(es)

- Greg Gard (UW-Platteville)
- Gary Close (Arizona State)
- Lamont Paris (Wooster)

Legend

- (C) Team captain
- (S) Suspended
- (I) Ineligible
- (W) Walk-on
- Injured
- Current redshirt

Roster
Last update: 2010-11-9

== Schedule and results ==
- All times are Central

Date time, TV	Rank^{#}	Opponent^{#}	Result	Record	High points	High rebounds	High assists	Site (attendance) city, state
Exhibition
11/05/2011*; 7:00 pm	No. 15	UW–Stevens Point	W 80–54	–	16 – Evans	6 – Brust	7 – Taylor	Kohl Center (16,889); Madison, WI
Regular Season
11/12/2011*; 12:00 pm	No. 15	Kennesaw State	W 85–31	1–0	14 – Tied	8 – Bruesewitz (1)	7 – Taylor (1)	Kohl Center (17,230); Madison, WI
11/16/2011*; 7:00 pm	No. 14	Colgate	W 68–41	2–0	17 – Brust (2)	7 – Tied	4 – Taylor (2)	Kohl Center (17,230); Madison, WI
11/19/2011*; 6:00 pm	No. 14	Wofford; Chicago Invitational Challenge	W 69–33	3–0	16 – Gasser (2)	8 – Bruesewitz (2)	5 – Evans (1)	Kohl Center (17,230); Madison, WI
11/22/2011*; 7:00 pm, BTN	No. 11	UMKC; Chicago Invitational Challenge	W 77–31	4–0	21 – Berggren (1)	6 – Tied	5 – Taylor (3)	Kohl Center (17,230); Madison, WI
11/25/2011*; 7:30 pm, BTN	No. 11	vs. Bradley; Chicago Invitational Challenge Semifinals	W 66–43	5–0	15 – Evans (1)	10 – Berggren (2)	6 – Taylor (4)	Sears Centre (3,424); Hoffman Estates, IL
11/26/2011*; 7:00 pm, BTN	No. 11	vs. BYU; Chicago Invitational Challenge Championship Game	W 73–56	6–0	21 – Brust (3)	6 – Bruesewitz (3)	8 – Taylor (5)	Sears Centre (2,634); Hoffman Estates, IL
11/30/2011*; 8:30 pm, ESPN	No. 9	at No. 5 North Carolina; ACC – Big Ten Challenge	L 57–60	6–1	18 – Taylor (1)	7 – Evans (2)	4 – Taylor (6)	Dean Smith Center (21,750); Chapel Hill, NC
12/03/2011*; 3:30 pm, BTN	No. 9	No. 16 Marquette	L 54–61	6–2	13 – Taylor (2)	8 – Evans (3)	3 – Gasser (1)	Kohl Center (17,230); Madison, WI
12/07/2011*; 7:00 pm	No. 14	Green Bay	W 70–42	7–2	15 – Taylor (3)	8 – Bruesewitz (4)	10 – Taylor (7)	Kohl Center (17,076); Madison, WI
12/10/2011*; 1:00 pm, BTN	No. 14	UNLV	W 62–51	8–2	25 – Brust (4)	10 – Bruesewitz (5)	6 – Taylor (8)	Kohl Center (17,123); Madison, WI
12/13/2011*; 7:00 pm	No. 14	at Milwaukee	W 60–54	9–2	17 – Berggren (2)	9 – Berggren (3)	3 – Tied	U.S. Cellular Arena (10,143); Milwaukee, WI
12/15/2011*; 7:00 pm, BTN	No. 14	Savannah State	W 66–33	10–2	13 – Berggren (3)	5 – Tied	3 – Taylor (10)	Kohl Center (16,954); Madison, WI
12/23/2011*; 4:30 pm, BTN	No. 13	Mississippi Valley State	W 79–45	11–2	17 – Taylor (4)	11 – Evans (5)	2 – Tied	Kohl Center (17,230); Madison, WI
12/27/2011; 8:00 pm, ESPN2	No. 11	at Nebraska	W 64–40	12–2 (1–0)	22 – Evans (2)	6 – Tied	5 – Taylor (12)	Bob Devaney Sports Center (11,422); Lincoln, NE
12/31/2011; 12:00 pm, BTN	No. 11	Iowa	L 65–72	12–3 (1–1)	17 – Taylor (5)	8 – Gasser (3)	4 – Taylor (13)	Kohl Center (17,230); Madison, WI
01/03/2012; 6:00 pm, ESPN2	No. 18	No. 10 Michigan State	L 60–63 ^{OT}	12–4 (1–2)	28 – Taylor (6)	6 – Tied	3 – Brust (2)	Kohl Center (17,230); Madison, WI
01/08/2012; 12:30 pm, CBS	No. 18	at No. 16 Michigan	L 41–59	12–5 (1–3)	12 – Taylor (7)	10 – Evans (7)	3 – Bruesewitz (2)	Crisler Arena (12,721); Ann Arbor, MI
01/12/2012; 6:00 pm, ESPN		at Purdue	W 67–62	13–5 (2–3)	13 – Brust (5)	5 – Tied	5 – Taylor (14)	Mackey Arena (14,620); West Lafayette, IN
01/15/2012; 5:00 pm, BTN		Nebraska	W 50–45	14–5 (3–3)	19 – Taylor (8)	13 – Berggren (5)	2 – Evans (3)	Kohl Center (17,173); Madison, WI
01/18/2012; 8:00 pm, BTN		Northwestern	W 77–57	15–5 (4–3)	17 – Evans (3)	9 – Evans (9)	6 – Taylor (15)	Kohl Center (16,939); Madison, WI
01/22/2012; 1:00 pm, BTN		at No. 22 Illinois	W 67–63	16–5 (5–3)	19 – Taylor (9)	9 – Taylor (4)	5 – Taylor (16)	Assembly Hall (16,618); Champaign, IL
01/26/2012; 8:00 pm, ESPN2	No. 25	No. 16 Indiana	W 57–50	17–5 (6–3)	13 – Brust (6)	9 – Evans (10)	2 – Tied	Kohl Center (17,230); Madison, WI
01/31/2012; 7:00 pm, BTN	No. 19	at Penn State	W 52–46	18–5 (7–3)	18 – Taylor (10)	10 – Berggren (6)	5 – Taylor (18)	Bryce Jordan Center (8,752); University Park, PA
02/04/2012; 1:00 pm, ESPN	No. 19	No. 3 Ohio State	L 52–58	18–6 (7–4)	14 – Evans (4)	11 – Bruesewitz (6)	6 – Taylor (19)	Kohl Center (17,230); Madison, WI
02/09/2012; 6:30 pm, ESPN	No. 21	at Minnesota	W 68–61 ^{OT}	19–6 (8–4)	27 – Taylor (11)	11 – Evans (11)	4 – Tied	Williams Arena (14,625); Minneapolis, MN
02/16/2012; 6:00 pm, ESPN	No. 15	at No. 7 Michigan State	L 55–69	19–7 (8–5)	17 – Evans (5)	7 – Evans (12)	5 – Taylor (20)	Breslin Student Events Center (14,797); East Lansing, MI
02/19/2012; 3:00 pm, BTN	No. 15	Penn State	W 65–55	20–7 (9–5)	15 – Gasser (3)	12 – Bruesewitz (7)	5 – Bruesewitz (5)	Kohl Center (17,230); Madison, WI
02/23/2012; 8:00 pm, ESPN2	No. 16	at Iowa	L 66–67	20–8 (9–6)	14 – Tied	6 – Evans (13)	4 – Taylor (21)	Carver–Hawkeye Arena (14,248); Iowa City, IA
02/26/2012; 3:00 pm, CBS	No. 16	at No. 8 Ohio State	W 63–60	21–8 (10–6)	19 – Taylor (12)	10 – Evans (14)	4 – Taylor (22)	Value City Arena (18,809); Columbus, OH
02/28/2012; 7:00 pm, BTN	No. 14	Minnesota	W 52–45	22–8 (11–6)	22 – Taylor (13)	8 – Evans (15)	3 – Brust (3)	Kohl Center (17,230); Madison, WI
03/04/2012; 12:00 pm, BTN	No. 14	Illinois	W 70–56	23–8 (12–6)	16 – Tied	8 – Gasser (5)	3 – Tied	Kohl Center (17,230); Madison, WI
Big Ten tournament
03/09/2012; 1:30 pm, ESPN	No. 14	vs. No. 15 Indiana; Quarterfinals	W 79–71	24–8	30 – Wilson (1)	9 – Berggren (7)	4 – Tied	Bankers Life Fieldhouse (18,484); Indianapolis, IN
03/10/2012; 12:40 pm, CBS	No. 14	vs. No. 8 Michigan State; Semifinals	L 52–65	24–9	19 – Taylor (15)	5 – Tied	3 – Bruesewitz (7)	Bankers Life Fieldhouse (18,451); Indianapolis, IN
NCAA Division I tournament
03/15/2012*; 1:10 pm, TNT	No. 14 (4)	vs. (13) Montana; Second Round	W 73–49	25–9	18 – Evans (7)	8 – Tied	6 – Taylor (25)	University Arena (10,774); Albuquerque, NM
03/17/2012*; 5:10 pm, TNT	No. 14 (4)	vs. No. 20 (5) Vanderbilt; Third round	W 60–57	26–9	14 – Taylor (16)	6 – Berggren (8)	4 – Evans (5)	University Arena (12,128); Albuquerque, NM
03/22/2012*; 6:15 pm, CBS	No. 14 (4)	vs. No. 2 (1) Syracuse; Sweet Sixteen	L 63–64	26–10	17 – Tied	4 – Tied	6 – Taylor (26)	TD Garden (–); Boston, MA
*Non-conference game. ^{#}Rankings from AP Poll. (#) Tournament seedings in parentheses.

== National Rankings ==
Regular season polls
Poll	Pre- Season	Week 1	Week 2	Week 3	Week 4	Week 5	Week 6	Week 7	Week 8	Week 9	Week 10	Week 11	Week 12	Week 13	Week 14	Week 15	Week 16	Week 17	Week 18	Final
AP	15	14	11	9	14	14	13	11	18	RV	RV	25	19	21	15	16	14	14	14	14
Coaches	14	13	11	7	16	15	14	11	19	RV	RV	25	20	22	17	15	15	12	13	12

Legend
	Increase in ranking
	Decrease in ranking
	No change
(RV)	Received votes

== Player statistics ==
- As of March 23, 2012

		        MINUTES    |--TOTAL--|   |--3-PTS--| |-F-THROWS-| |---REBOUNDS---|                 |-SCORING-| 
## Player           GP GS Tot  Avg  FG  FGA  Pct  3FG 3FA Pct FT FTA  Pct  Off Def Tot Avg PF FO  A TO Blk Stl Pts Avg 
11 Taylor, Jordan   36 36 1297 36.0 166 413 .402  65 176 .369 135 172 .785  31 106 137 3.8 73  0 147  56  1 37 532 14.8
05 Evans, Ryan      36 36 1098 30.5 151 343 .440  10  38 .263  85 117 .726  60 183 243 6.8 74  1  58  57 33 26 397 11.0
40 Berggren, Jared  36 36 1000 27.8 141 312 .452  45 121 .372  52  71 .732  51 125 176 4.9 86  2  27  51 60 32 379 10.5
21 Gasser, Josh     36 36 1227 34.1  84 181 .464  42  93 .452  65  83 .783  31 121 152 4.2 66  0  67  43  3 25 275  7.6
01 Brust, Ben       36  0  768 21.3  92 232 .397  58 149 .389  20  24 .833  16  63  79 2.2 33  0  26  26  0 24 262  7.3
31 Bruesewitz, Mike 36 36  918 25.5  71 180 .394  25  85 .294  36  51 .706  69 116 185 5.1 92  3  63  38 12 22 203  5.6
33 Wilson, Rob      36  0  467 13.0  49 118 .415  25  65 .385  22  32 .688  18  33  51 1.4 32  0  22  14  3  7 145  4.0
44 Kaminsky, Frank  35  0  271  7.7  23  56 .411  10  35 .286   7  14 .500  22  28  50 1.4 34  0  10  10 13  4  63  1.8
22 Wise, J.D.        6  0   10  1.7   3   3 1.000  1   1 1.000  0   0 .000   0   0   0 0.0  0  0   0   1  0  0   7  1.2
12 Jackson, Traevon 17  0   92  5.4   7  19 .368   3   8 .375   2   3 .667   6  10  16 0.9  7  0   3   7  1  1  19  1.1
02 Smith, Jordan     7  0   12  1.7   2   3 .667   1   1 1.000  0   0 .000   0   2   2 0.3  0  0   0   0  0  0   5  0.7
13 Dukan, Duje      13  0   41  3.2   4   7 .571   0   2 .000   1   4 .250   1   6   7 0.5  2  0   2   3  0  3   9  0.7
32 Anderson, Evan   14  0   35  2.5   3   6 .500   0   1 .000   0   4 .000   4   3   7 0.5 10  0   3   1  0  0   6  0.4
10 Fahey, Dan        9  0   14  1.6   1   2 .500   0   0 .000   0   0 .000   1   6   7 0.8  1  0   0   1  0  0   2  0.2
   Team                                                                    39  56  95       2     12 
   Total..........  36  7250  797 1875 .425 285 775 .368 425 575 .739 349 858 1207 33.5 512  6 428  320 126 181 2304 64.0
   Opponents......  36  7250  708 1819 .389 129 439 .294 370 542 .683 331 792 1123 31.2 604  7 286  388  84 154 1915 53.2
