= 2011–12 Illinois Fighting Illini men's basketball team =

American college basketball season

2011–2012 Illinois Fighting Illini men's basketball

Cancún Challenge Champions
- Conference: Big Ten Conference
- Record: 17–15 (6–12 Big Ten)
- Head coach: Bruce Weber (9th season)
- Assistant coaches: Wayne McClain (11th season); Jay Price (9th season); Jerrance Howard (5th season)
- MVP: Tracy Abrams
- Captains: Sam Maniscalco; D.J. Richardson
- Home arena: Assembly Hall

2011–12 Big Ten Conference men's basketball standings
	Conf.				Overall
Team	W		L	PCT	W		L	PCT
No. 5 Michigan State†	13	–	5	.722	29	–	8	.784
No. 13 Michigan	13	–	5	.722	24	–	10	.706
No. 7 Ohio State	13	–	5	.722	31	–	8	.795
No. 14 Wisconsin	12	–	6	.667	26	–	10	.722
No. 16 Indiana	11	–	7	.611	27	–	9	.750
Purdue	10	–	8	.556	22	–	13	.629
Northwestern	8	–	10	.444	19	–	14	.576
Iowa	8	–	10	.444	18	–	17	.514
Illinois	6	–	12	.333	17	–	15	.531
Minnesota	6	–	12	.333	23	–	15	.605
Nebraska	4	–	14	.222	12	–	18	.400
Penn State	4	–	14	.222	12	–	20	.375
† 2012 Big Ten tournament winner Rankings from AP poll

The 2011–12 Illinois Fighting Illini men's basketball team represented the University of Illinois at Urbana–Champaign in the 2011–12 NCAA Division I men's basketball season. This was head coach Bruce Weber's ninth and final season at Illinois. The Illini played their home games at Assembly Hall and were members of the Big Ten Conference.

== Pre-season ==
=== Departures ===
Name	Number	Pos.	Height	Weight	Year	Hometown	Notes
Mike Davis	24	F	6'6"	225	Senior	Alexandria, VA	Graduated/Pro for BC Ferro-ZNTU (Ukraine)
Bill Cole	30	F	6'9"	215	Senior	Peoria, IL	Graduated/Pro for Cheshire Jets (England)
Demetri McCamey	32	G	6'3"	200	Senior	Bellwood, IL	Graduated/Pro for Mersin BB (Turkey)
Mike Tisdale	54	F	7'1"	235	Senior	Riverton, IL	Graduated/Pro for DJK Würzburg (Germany)

=== 2011–12 incoming team members ===
Prior to the 2011–12 season, Illinois welcomed seven new players into the program. The 2011 recruiting class was ranked No. 13 by Scout.com and No. 11 by both Rivals.com and ESPNU. The class was celebrated for its talent and depth, and is the second class in a row that has revived top-15 national rankings. Six true freshman; Tracy Abrams, Myke Henry, Devin Langford, Nnanna Egwu, Mike Shaw, and Ibby Djimde as well as one transfer senior, Sam Maniscalco joined the 2011–12 team. Maniscalso transferred from Bradley University after graduating in May 2011. Because Bradley did not offer the graduate program he enrolled in at Illinois, Maniscalco was eligible to play immediately.

=== 2011 Recruiting Class ===
College recruiting
Name	Hometown	School	Height	Weight	Commit date
Tracy Abrams; PG	Chicago, IL	Mount Carmel	6 ft 1 in (1.85 m)	175 lb (79 kg)	Dec 18, 2008
Tracy Abrams; PG	Recruit ratings: Scout: Rivals: 247Sports: (92)				
Ibby Djimde; C	Huntington, WV	Huntington Prep	6 ft 8 in (2.03 m)	220 lb (100 kg)	Aug 5, 2011
Ibby Djimde; C	Recruit ratings: Scout: Rivals: (87)				
Nnanna Egwu; C	Chicago, IL	St. Ignatius	6 ft 9 in (2.06 m)	190 lb (86 kg)	Sep 10, 2009
Nnanna Egwu; C	Recruit ratings: Scout: Rivals: 247Sports: (94)				
Myke Henry; SF	Chicago, IL	Orr Academy	6 ft 6 in (1.98 m)	220 lb (100 kg)	Oct 5, 2010
Myke Henry; SF	Recruit ratings: Scout: Rivals: 247Sports: (92)				
Devin Langford; SF	Huntsville, AL	Lee High School	6 ft 6 in (1.98 m)	190 lb (86 kg)	Dec 16, 2010
Devin Langford; SF	Recruit ratings: Scout: Rivals: 247Sports: (91)				
Sam Maniscalco; G	Chicago, IL	St. Patrick / Bradley	6 ft 0 in (1.83 m)	175 lb (79 kg)	Apr 13, 2011
Sam Maniscalco; G	Recruit ratings: Scout: Rivals: (78)				
Mike Shaw; PF	Chicago, IL	De La Salle Institute	6 ft 8 in (2.03 m)	220 lb (100 kg)	Oct 28, 2010
Mike Shaw; PF	Recruit ratings: Scout: Rivals: 247Sports: (92)				
Overall recruit ranking: Scout: 13 Rivals: 11 247Sports: 11 On3: 10 ESPN: 11
Note: In many cases, Scout, Rivals, 247Sports, On3, and ESPN may conflict in their listings of height and weight.; In these cases, the average was taken. ESPN grades are on a 100-point scale.; Sources: "Illinois Commit List for 2011". Rivals.; "Men's Basketball Recruiting". Scout.; "ESPN - Illinois Fighting Illini Basketball Recruiting 2011". ESPN.; "Scout.com Team Recruiting Rankings". Scout.; "2011 Team Ranking". Rivals.; "2011–12 Illinois Fighting Illini men's basketball team". 247Sports.; "2011–12 Illinois Fighting Illini men's basketball team". On3.

=== Italy Trip ===
Prior to the start of fall semester classes, the team embarked on a 10-day international tour of Italy in August 2011. With stops in Rome, Florence, Venice, and Como the trip was a combination of basketball, sightseeing, and team-building. The team played four full games, which included wins over Roma Select, Castellanza Select, and Fulgor Omegna as well as an overtime loss to the New Zealand National team Also, the Illini traveled to Aviano Air Base, where Illinois played West Virginia in a 20-minute scrimmage and the Aviano varsity team in a 10-minute scrimmage.

== Roster ==
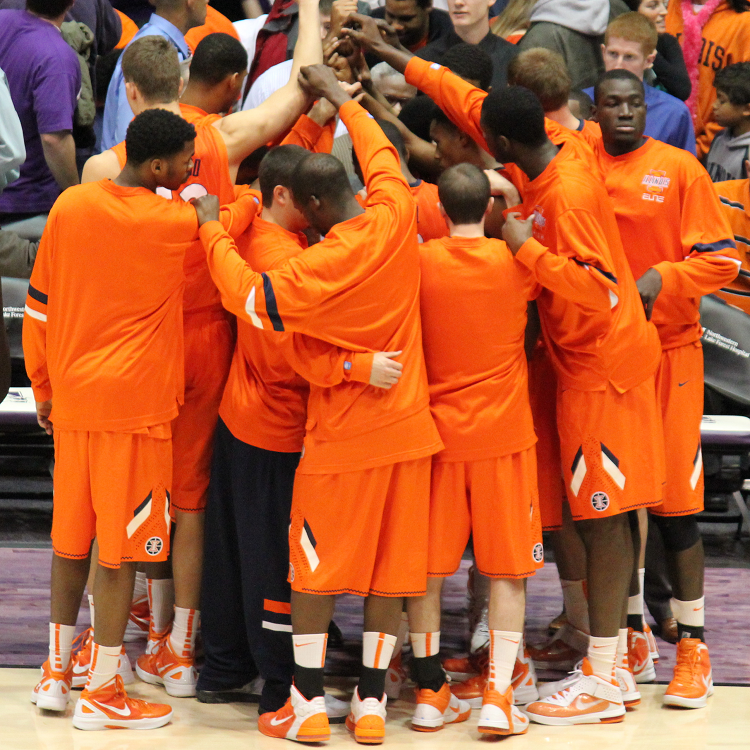
The 2011–12 Illinois Fighting Illini men's basketball team at Welsh-Ryan Arena in Evanston, Illinois on January 4, 2012.

2011–12 Illinois Fighting Illini men's basketball team
Players
Coaches

Pos.	#	Name	Height	Weight	Year	Previous school	Hometown
G	0	Sam Maniscalco (C)	6 ft 0 in (1.83 m)	180 lb (82 kg)	GS	St. Patrick High School/Bradley	Chicago, IL
G	1	D.J. Richardson (C)	6 ft 3 in (1.91 m)	195 lb (88 kg)	Jr	Central High School	Peoria, IL
G	2	Joseph Bertrand	6 ft 5 in (1.96 m)	195 lb (88 kg)	RS So	Sterling High School	Sterling, IL
G	3	Brandon Paul	6 ft 4 in (1.93 m)	200 lb (91 kg)	Jr	Warren Township High School	Gurnee, IL
G	4	Crandall Head (Note: Head left the team in December with plans to transfer to another school.)	6 ft 4 in (1.93 m)	190 lb (86 kg)	So	Rich South High School	Matteson, IL
C	12	Meyers Leonard	7 ft 0 in (2.13 m)	245 lb (111 kg)	So	Robinson High School	Robinson, IL
G	13	Tracy Abrams	6 ft 1 in (1.85 m)	185 lb (84 kg)	Fr	Mount Carmel High School	Chicago, IL
F	15	Mike Shaw	6 ft 8 in (2.03 m)	230 lb (104 kg)	Fr	De La Salle Institute	Chicago, IL
G/F	20	Myke Henry	6 ft 6 in (1.98 m)	230 lb (104 kg)	Fr	Orr Academy High School	Chicago, IL
G/F	21	Devin Langford	6 ft 7 in (2.01 m)	200 lb (91 kg)	Fr	Lee High School	Huntsville, AL
F/C	23	Ibby Djimde	6 ft 8 in (2.03 m)	250 lb (113 kg)	Fr	Huntington Prep School	Mali, Africa
G	25	Jean Selus (W)	6 ft 2 in (1.88 m)	195 lb (88 kg)	Sr	West Orange High School	Montreal, Quebec
F/C	32	Nnanna Egwu	6 ft 11 in (2.11 m)	245 lb (111 kg)	Fr	St. Ignatius College Prep	Chicago, IL
F	42	Tyler Griffey	6 ft 8 in (2.03 m)	235 lb (107 kg)	Jr	Lafayette High School	Wildwood, MO
G	44	Kervin Berardini	6 ft 0 in (1.83 m)	175 lb (79 kg)	RS So	Lake Forest High School/Loyola Marymount	Lake Forest, IL

Head coach

- Bruce Weber (Milwaukee)

Assistant coach(es)

- Jerrance Howard (Illinois) (interim HC)
- Wayne McClain (Illinois State)
- Jay Price (Kansas)
- Gary Nottingham (Glenville State)
- Sean Harrington (Illinois)

Legend

- (C) Team captain
- (S) Suspended
- (I) Ineligible
- (W) Walk-on
- Injured
- Current redshirt

Roster
Last update: October 22, 2010

== Schedule ==
Date time, TV	Rank^{#}	Opponent^{#}	Result	Record	High points	High rebounds	High assists	Site (attendance) city, state
Italy Trip
August 13, 2011*; 12:30 a.m.		at Roma Selezione	W 78-68	1-0	14 – Bertrand	8 – Griffey	5 – Bertrand	(100); Rome, Italy
August 16, 2011*; 11:00 a.m.		vs. New Zealand National Team	L 84-85 ^{OT}	1-1	18 – Paul	5 – Tied	3 – Paul	(250); Forli, Italy
August 17, 2011*; 12:00 p.m.		vs. West Virginia	W 47-26	2-1	11 – Richardson	3 – Bertrand	4 – Maniscalco	Aviano Air Base (500); Aviano, Italy
August 18, 2011*; 2:00 p.m.		at Castellanza Select	W 131-65	3-1	18 – Bertrand	8 – Shaw	6 – Paul	(400); Castellanza, Italy
August 19, 2011*; 11:00 a.m.		vs. Fulgor Omegna	W 89-85 ^{OT}	4-1	19 – Paul	10 – Griffey	3 – Ricardson	(500); Verbania, Italy
Exhibition
November 1, 2011*; 7:30pm		Wayne State (NE)	W 79-52	-	18 – Leonard	8 – Shaw	5 – Abrams	Assembly Hall (13,164); Champaign, IL
November 7, 2011*; 7:30pm		Quincy	W 73-45	-	17 – Richardson	9 – Shaw	3 – Paul, Bertrand	Assembly Hall (13,077); Champaign, IL
Non-Conference regular season
November 11, 2011*; 8:00pm		Loyola Chicago	W 67-49	1-0	15 – Leonard	7 – Abrams	3 – Maniscalco, Paul	Assembly Hall (15,937); Champaign, IL
November 14, 2011*; 7:30pm		SIU Edwardsville; Cancún Challenge	W 66-46	2-0	20 – Richardson	14 – Griffey	4 – Paul	Assembly Hall (13,404); Champaign, IL
November 17, 2011*; 8:00pm, BTN		Lipscomb; Cancun Challenge	W 79-64	3-0	17 – Richardson	8 – Bertrand	3 – Maniscalco, Paul	Assembly Hall (13,503); Champaign, IL
November 22, 2011*; 8:30pm, CBSSN		vs. Richmond; Cancun Challenge	W 70-61	4-0	22 – Leonard	12 – Leonard	3 – Maniscalco	Moon Palace Resort (980); Cancún, Mexico
November 23, 2011*; 8:30pm, CBSSN		vs. Illinois State; Cancun Challenge	W 63-59	5-0	14 – Maniscalco	8 – Leonard	6 – Paul	Moon Palace Resort (952); Cancún, Mexico
November 27, 2011*; 12:00pm, BTN		Chicago State	W 90-43	6-0	14 – Henry	6 – Shaw	5 – Abrams, Richardson	Assembly Hall (14,065); Champaign, IL
November 29, 2011*; 6:30pm, ESPN		at Maryland; ACC - Big Ten Challenge	W 71-62	7-0	24 – Maniscalco	7 – Paul	4 – Abrams	Comcast Center (13,187); College Park, MD
December 3, 2011*; 2:15pm, ESPN2		No. 19 Gonzaga	W 82-75	8-0	21 – Leonard	5 – Maniscalco, Leonard	5 – Maniscalco, Paul	Assembly Hall (15,879); Champaign, IL
December 7, 2011*; 8:00pm, ESPN2	No. 24	St. Bonaventure	W 48-43	9-0	17 – Paul	8 – Leonard	5 – Paul	Assembly Hall (14,711); Champaign, IL
December 11, 2011*; 7:00pm, ESPNU	No. 24	Coppin State	W 80-63	10-0	20 – Richardson	11 – Leonard	5 – Maniscalco	Assembly Hall (14,811); Champaign, IL
December 17, 2011*; 4:00pm, BTN	No. 19	vs. UNLV	L 48-64	10-1	19 – Richardson	8 – Richardson	3 – Leonard	United Center (15,144); Chicago, IL
December 19, 2011*; 7:00pm, ESPN3	No. 25	Cornell	W 64-60	11-1	19 – Leonard	16 – Leonard	6 – Maniscalco	Assembly Hall (13,578); Champaign, IL
December 22, 2011*; 8:00pm, ESPN2	No. 25	vs. No. 10 Missouri; Braggin' Rights	L 74-78	11-2	19 – Paul	13 – Leonard	5 – Leonard	Scottrade Center (22,087); St. Louis, MO
Big Ten regular season
December 27, 2011; 6:30pm, BTN		Minnesota	W 81-72 ^{2OT}	12-2 (1-0)	21 – Paul	11 – Leonard	6 – Paul	Assembly Hall (15,549); Champaign, IL
December 31, 2011; 3:00pm, ESPN2		at Purdue	L 60-75	12-3 (1-1)	17 – Paul	6 – Leonard, Richardson	4 – Abrams	Mackey Arena (14,041); West Lafayette, IN
January 4, 2012; 6:00pm, BTN		at Northwestern; Rivalry	W 57-56	13-3 (2-1)	12 – Leonard	8 – Leonard, Bertrand	4 – Paul, Richardson	Welsh-Ryan Arena (8,117); Evanston, IL
January 7, 2012; 12:00pm, BTN		Nebraska	W 59-54	14-3 (3-1)	25 – Bertrand	6 – Paul	3 – Paul	Assembly Hall (14,909); Champaign, IL
January 10, 2012; 8:00pm, ESPN		No. 5 Ohio State	W 79-74	15-3 (4-1)	43 – Paul	8 – Paul	4 – Richardson	Assembly Hall (14,636); Champaign, IL
January 19, 2012; 8:00pm, ESPN2	No. 22	at Penn State	L 52-54	15-4 (4-2)	20 – Paul	6 – Bertrand, Paul	5 – Richardson	Bryce Jordan Center (6,945); University Park, PA
January 22, 2012; 1:00pm, BTN	No. 22	Wisconsin	L 63-67	15-5 (4-3)	16 – Leonard	11 – Leonard	5 – Bertrand	Assembly Hall (16,618); Champaign, IL
January 28, 2012; 7:00pm, BTN		at Minnesota	L 72-77 ^{OT}	15-6 (4-4)	28 – Paul	13 – Leonard	4 – Abrams	Williams Arena (14,625); Minneapolis, MN
January 31, 2012; 6:00pm, ESPN		No. 10 Michigan State	W 42-41	16-6 (5-4)	18 – Paul	9 – Paul	5 – Paul	Assembly Hall (15,629); Champaign, IL
February 5, 2012; 2:00pm, BTN		Northwestern; Rivalry	L 70-74	16-7 (5-5)	22 – Paul	9 – Leonard	8 – Abrams	Assembly Hall (15,461); Champaign, IL
February 9, 2012; 7:00pm, BTN		at No. 23 Indiana; Rivalry	L 71-84	16-8 (5-6)	19 – Richardson	3 – Leonard, Paul, Richardson, Bertrand	5 – Paul	Assembly Hall (17,389); Bloomington, IN
February 12, 2012; 12:00pm, CBS		at No. 22 Michigan	L 61-70	16-9 (5-7)	21 – Paul	12 – Leonard	3 – Paul, Abrams	Crisler Arena (12,721); Ann Arbor, MI
February 15, 2012; 7:30pm, BTN		Purdue	L 62-67	16-10 (5-8)	22 – Abrams	12 – Leonard	5 – Bertrand	Assembly Hall (14,339); Champaign, IL
February 18, 2012; 4:00pm, BTN		at Nebraska	L 57-80	16-11 (5-9)	15 – Richardson	5 – Leonard, Richardson, Egwu	5 – Bertrand	Bob Devaney Sports Center (10,558); Lincoln, NE
February 21, 2012; 6:00pm, ESPN		at No. 8 Ohio State	L 67-83	16-12 (5-10)	21 – Leonard	6 – Richardson	3 – Paul	Value City Arena (18,481); Columbus, OH
February 26, 2012; 5:00pm, BTN		Iowa; Rivalry	W 65-54	17-12 (6-10)	22 – Leonard	14 – Leonard	4 – Maniscalco	Assembly Hall (16,322); Champaign, IL
March 1, 2012; 6:00pm, ESPN		No. 13 Michigan	L 61-72	17-13 (6-11)	18 – Leonard	9 – Leonard	3 – Bertrand	Assembly Hall (15,244); Champaign, IL
March 4, 2012; 12:00pm, BTN		at No. 14 Wisconsin	L 56-70	17-14 (6-12)	22 – Paul	12 – Leonard	2 – Paul	Kohl Center (17,230); Madison, WI
Big Ten tournament
March 8, 2012; 10:30am, BTN	(9)	vs. (8) Iowa; First Round	L 61-64	17-15	18 – Leonard	6 – Leonard, Richardson, Griffey	4 – Paul, Abrams	Bankers Life Fieldhouse (-); Indianapolis, IN
*Non-conference game. ^{#}Rankings from AP Poll. (#) Tournament seedings in parentheses. All times are in Central Time.

== National rankings ==
Regular season polls
Poll	Pre- Season	Week 1	Week 2	Week 3	Week 4	Week 5	Week 6	Week 7	Week 8	Week 9	Week 10	Week 11	Week 12	Week 13	Week 14	Week 15	Week 16	Week 17	Week 18	Final
AP	(RV)	(RV)	(RV)	(RV)	24	19	25	(RV)		(RV)	22	(RV)	(RV)							
Coaches			(RV)	(RV)	T-22	19	24	(RV)	(RV)	(RV)	25	(RV)								
Record when polls released	0–0	1–0	3–0	6–0	8–0	10–0	10–1	11–2	12–3	14–3	15–3	15–5	15–6	16–7	16–9	16–11	17–12	17–14	17–15	17–15

Legend
	Increase in ranking
	Decrease in ranking
	No change
(RV)	Received votes
T	Tied

== Season Statistics ==
Legend
GP	Games played	GS	Games started	Avg	Average per game
FG	Field-goals made	FGA	Field-goal attempts	Off	Offensive rebounds
Def	Defensive rebounds	A	Assists	TO	Turnovers
Blk	Blocks	Stl	Steals	High	Team high

Individual player statistics
			Minutes		Scoring		Total FGs			3-point FGs			Free-throws			Rebounds							
Player	GP	GS	Tot	Avg	Pts	Avg	FG	FGA	Pct	3FG	3FA	Pct	FT	FTA	Pct	Off	Def	Tot	Avg	A	TO	Blk	Stl
Paul, Brandon	32	30	1070	33.4	469	14.7	145	370	.392	54	162	.333	125	172	.727	30	121	151	4.7	94	109	27	46
Leonard, Meyers	32	30	1018	31.8	434	13.6	170	291	.584	1	11	.091	93	127	.732	73	189	262	8.2	43	68	60	15
Richardson, D.J.	32	31	1106	34.6	372	11.6	130	336	.387	71	204	.348	41	53	.774	28	68	96	3	55	44	5	27
Bertrand, Joseph	32	14	644	20.1	209	6.5	92	171	.538	3	10	.300	22	30	.733	23	63	86	2.7	43	37	5	11
Maniscalco, Sam	28	13	677	24.2	171	6.1	56	151	.371	27	96	.281	32	39	.821	7	46	53	1.9	64	27	0	15
Griffey, Tyler	30	20	496	16.5	146	4.9	59	137	.431	16	56	.286	12	16	.750	44	56	100	3.3	18	26	11	13
Abrams, Tracy	32	19	674	21.1	136	4.3	49	120	.408	9	35	.257	29	46	.630	22	50	72	2.3	60	50	0	14
Henry, Myke	22	0	179	8.1	70	3.2	28	62	.452	4	25	.160	10	15	.667	11	14	25	1.1	2	9	3	7
Egwu, Nnanna	32	3	313	9.8	60	1.9	27	57	.474	0	0	.000	6	13	.462	21	27	48	1.5	6	22	20	6
Head, Crandall	9	0	83	9.2	9	1	4	17	.235	0	5	.000	1	1	1.000	1	4	5	0.6	9	9	0	5
Shaw, Mike	20	0	139	7	17	0.9	6	21	.286	1	6	.167	4	10	.400	11	26	37	1.9	5	13	1	2
Djimde, Ibby	17	0	61	3.6	5	0.3	1	6	.167	0	0	.000	3	7	.429	2	12	14	0.8	0	6	0	1
Selus, Jean	9	0	9	1	0	0	0	2	.000	0	1	.000	0	0	.000	0	1	1	0.1	1	0	0	0
Berardini, Kevin	7	0	6	0.9	0	0	0	0	.000	0	0	.000	0	0	.000	0	0	0	0	0	0	0	0
Team																47	48	95			10		
Total	32		6475		2098	65.6	767	1741	.441	186	611	.304	378	529	.715	320	725	1045	32.7	400	430	132	162
Opponents	32		6476		2055	64.2	712	1659	.429	208	549	.379	423	601	.704	298	704	1002	31.3	379	425	78	200
