= 2011–12 Ohio State Buckeyes men's basketball team =

American college basketball season

2011–12 Ohio State Buckeyes men's basketball

Big Ten regular season co-champion

NCAA tournament, Final Four
- Conference: Big Ten Conference

Ranking
- Coaches: No. 3
- AP: No. 7
- Record: 31–8 (13–5 Big Ten)
- Head coach: Thad Matta
- Assistant coaches: Dave Dickerson; Jeff Boals; Chris Jent
- Home arena: Value City Arena

2011–12 Big Ten Conference men's basketball standings
	Conf.				Overall
Team	W		L	PCT	W		L	PCT
No. 5 Michigan State†	13	–	5	.722	29	–	8	.784
No. 13 Michigan	13	–	5	.722	24	–	10	.706
No. 7 Ohio State	13	–	5	.722	31	–	8	.795
No. 14 Wisconsin	12	–	6	.667	26	–	10	.722
No. 16 Indiana	11	–	7	.611	27	–	9	.750
Purdue	10	–	8	.556	22	–	13	.629
Northwestern	8	–	10	.444	19	–	14	.576
Iowa	8	–	10	.444	18	–	17	.514
Illinois	6	–	12	.333	17	–	15	.531
Minnesota	6	–	12	.333	23	–	15	.605
Nebraska	4	–	14	.222	12	–	18	.400
Penn State	4	–	14	.222	12	–	20	.375
† 2012 Big Ten tournament winner Rankings from AP poll

The 2011–12 Ohio State Buckeyes men's basketball team represented Ohio State University during the 2011–12 NCAA Division I men's basketball season. Their head coach is Thad Matta, in his 8th season with the Buckeyes. The team plays its home games at Value City Arena in Columbus, Ohio, and is a member of the Big Ten Conference. The team clinched a share of the Big Ten regular season championship for the third year in the row with a 13–5 conference record, sharing it with Michigan and Michigan State. In the postseason, the team was invited to the 2012 Big Ten Conference men's basketball tournament, where they beat Purdue and Michigan before losing to Michigan State in the championship, and they also were invited to the 2012 NCAA Division I men's basketball tournament, where they beat Loyola, Gonzaga, Cincinnati, and an upset of Syracuse before losing to Kansas in the Final Four to finish the season with 31–8 in overall record.

== Pre-season ==
=== Previous season ===
Ohio State, led by experienced seniors and player of the year candidate Jared Sullinger, started the season 24–0. The Buckeyes were ranked No. 1 for six weeks during the regular season, as well as entering postseason play, and earned the No. 1 overall seed in the NCAA tournament with an overall regular season record of 29–2 along with a Big Ten tournament championship. After defeating UT–San Antonio and George Mason in the first two rounds of the tournament, Ohio State fell to the Kentucky Wildcats, who would eventually go on to the Final Four, 62–60, ending their season in the Sweet Sixteen for the second year in a row.

=== Departures ===
- No. 10 Eddie Days – G
- No. 23 David Lighty – G/F
- No. 24 Nikola Kecman – F
- No. 33 Jon Diebler – G
- No. 52 Dallas Lauderdale – F

=== 2011 recruiting class ===
College recruiting
Name	Hometown	School	Height	Weight	Commit date
Trey McDonald; PF	Battle Creek, Michigan	Battle Creek Central	6 ft 9 in (2.06 m)	230 lb (100 kg)	Oct 18, 2010
Trey McDonald; PF	Recruit ratings: Scout: Rivals: (91)				
LaQuinton Ross; SF	Burlington, New Jersey	Life Center Academy	6 ft 8 in (2.03 m)	195 lb (88 kg)	Aug 16, 2010
LaQuinton Ross; SF	Recruit ratings: Scout: Rivals: (95)				
Shannon Scott; PG	Alpharetta, Georgia	Milton	6 ft 2 in (1.88 m)	175 lb (79 kg)	Nov 25, 2009
Shannon Scott; PG	Recruit ratings: Scout: Rivals: (96)				
Sam Thompson; SF	Chicago, Illinois	Whitney Young	6 ft 6 in (1.98 m)	200 lb (91 kg)	Sep 12, 2010
Sam Thompson; SF	Recruit ratings: Scout: Rivals: (95)				
Amir Williams; C	Beverly Hills, Michigan	Country Day	6 ft 9 in (2.06 m)	220 lb (100 kg)	Nov 17, 2010
Amir Williams; C	Recruit ratings: Scout: Rivals: (95)				
Overall recruit ranking: Scout: 8 Rivals: 10 ESPN: 6
Note: In many cases, Scout, Rivals, 247Sports, On3, and ESPN may conflict in their listings of height and weight.; In these cases, the average was taken. ESPN grades are on a 100-point scale.; Sources: "Ohio State 2011 Basketball Commitments". Rivals.; "Ohio State Buckeyes 2011 Player Commits". ESPN.; "2011 Team Ranking". Rivals.

== Roster ==
2011–12 Ohio State Buckeyes men's basketball team
Players
Coaches

Pos.	#	Name	Height	Weight	Year	Hometown
F	0	Jared Sullinger	6 ft 9 in (2.06 m)	265 lb (120 kg)	So	Columbus, Ohio
F	1	Deshaun Thomas	6 ft 6 in (1.98 m)	225 lb (102 kg)	So	Fort Wayne, Indiana
G	2	Jordan Sibert	6 ft 4 in (1.93 m)	185 lb (84 kg)	So	Cincinnati, Ohio
G	3	Shannon Scott	6 ft 1 in (1.85 m)	180 lb (82 kg)	Fr	Alpharetta, Georgia
G	4	Aaron Craft	6 ft 2 in (1.88 m)	190 lb (86 kg)	So	Findlay, Ohio
F	10	LaQuinton Ross	6 ft 8 in (2.03 m)	225 lb (102 kg)	Fr	Jackson, Mississippi
F	12	Sam Thompson	6 ft 7 in (2.01 m)	190 lb (86 kg)	Fr	Chicago, Illinois
G	14	Alex Rogers	6 ft 2 in (1.88 m)	195 lb (88 kg)	Jr	Cincinnati, Ohio
F	15	J.D. Weatherspoon	6 ft 6 in (1.98 m)	215 lb (98 kg)	So	Columbus, Ohio
C	23	Amir Williams	6 ft 11 in (2.11 m)	220 lb (100 kg)	Fr	Birmingham, Michigan
F	30	Evan Ravenel	6 ft 8 in (2.03 m)	260 lb (118 kg)	Jr	Tampa, Florida
G	32	Lenzelle Smith Jr.	6 ft 4 in (1.93 m)	205 lb (93 kg)	So	Zion, Illinois
G	44	William Buford	6 ft 6 in (1.98 m)	220 lb (100 kg)	Sr	Toledo, Ohio
C	55	Trey McDonald	6 ft 8 in (2.03 m)	255 lb (116 kg)	Fr	Battle Creek, Michigan

Head coach

- Thad Matta

Assistant coach(es)

- Dave Dickerson
- Jeff Boals
- Chris Jent

Legend

- (C) Team captain
- (S) Suspended
- (I) Ineligible
- (W) Walk-on
- Injured
- Current redshirt

Roster
Last update: 2011-10-28

== Schedule ==
Date time, TV	Rank^{#}	Opponent^{#}	Result	Record	Site (attendance) city, state
Exhibition
November 6*; 2:00 pm	No. 3	Walsh	W 95–49	–	Value City Arena (13,696); Columbus, OH
Regular season
November 11*; 9:00 pm, BTN	No. 3	Wright State; Global Sports Shootout	W 73–42	1–0	Value City Arena (13,696); Columbus, OH
November 15*; 8:00 pm, ESPN2	No. 3	No. 7 Florida; Global Sports Shootout	W 81–74	2–0	Value City Arena (17,785); Columbus, OH
November 18*; 9:00 pm, BTN	No. 3	Jackson State; Global Sports Shootout	W 85–41	3–0	Value City Arena (14,621); Columbus, OH
November 21*; 8:30 pm, BTN	No. 3	North Florida; Global Sports Shootout	W 85–50	4–0	Value City Arena (12,552); Columbus, OH
November 23*; 7:00 pm, BTN	No. 3	VMI	W 107–74	5–0	Value City Arena (13,660); Columbus, OH
November 25*; 6:30 pm, BTN	No. 3	Valparaiso	W 80–47	6–0	Value City Arena (15,606); Columbus, OH
November 29*; 9:30 pm, ESPN	No. 2	No. 3 Duke; ACC – Big Ten Challenge	W 85–63	7–0	Value City Arena (18,809); Columbus, OH
December 3*; 12:00 pm	No. 2	Texas–Pan American	W 64–35	8–0	Value City Arena (14,041); Columbus, OH
December 10*; 3:15 pm, ESPN	No. 2	at No. 13 Kansas	L 67–78	8–1	Allen Fieldhouse (16,300); Lawrence, KS
December 14*; 7:30 pm, BTN	No. 2	USC Upstate	W 82–58	9–1	Value City Arena (13,552); Columbus, OH
December 17*; 12:00 pm, ESPN	No. 2	at South Carolina	W 74–66	10–1	Colonial Life Arena (13,654); Columbia, SC
December 20*; 8:30 pm, BTN	No. 2	Lamar	W 70–50	11–1	Value City Arena (14,169); Columbus, OH
December 22*; 8:30 pm, BTN	No. 2	Miami (Ohio)	W 69–40	12–1	Nationwide Arena (17,463); Columbus, OH
Big Ten Regular Season
December 28; 5:30 pm, BTN	No. 2	Northwestern	W 87–54	13–1 (1–0)	Value City Arena (19,049); Columbus, OH
December 31; 6:00 pm, ESPN2	No. 2	at No. 13 Indiana	L 70–74	13–2 (1–1)	Assembly Hall (17,472); Bloomington, IN
January 3; 6:30 pm, BTN	No. 6	Nebraska	W 71–40	14–2 (2–1)	Value City Arena (16,158); Columbus, OH
January 7; 3:00 pm, BTN	No. 6	at Iowa	W 76–47	15–2 (3–1)	Carver–Hawkeye Arena (15,400); Iowa City, IA
January 10; 9:00 pm, ESPN	No. 5	at Illinois	L 74–79	15–3 (3–2)	Assembly Hall (14,636); Champaign, IL
January 15; 4:30 pm, CBS	No. 5	No. 7 Indiana	W 80–63	16–3 (4–2)	Value City Arena (18,809); Columbus, OH
January 21; 8:00 pm, BTN	No. 6	at Nebraska	W 79–45	17–3 (5–2)	Bob Devaney Sports Center (12,214); Lincoln, NE
January 25; 6:30 pm, BTN	No. 4	Penn State	W 78–54	18–3 (6–2)	Value City Arena (16,907); Columbus, OH
January 29; 1:00 pm, CBS	No. 4	No. 20 Michigan	W 64–49	19–3 (7–2)	Value City Arena (18,809); Columbus, OH
February 4; 2:00 pm, ESPN	No. 3	at No. 19 Wisconsin	W 58–52	20–3 (8–2)	Kohl Center (17,230); Madison, WI
February 7; 9:00 pm, ESPN	No. 3	Purdue	W 87–84	21–3 (9–2)	Value City Arena (16,504); Columbus, OH
February 11; 6:00 pm, ESPN	No. 3	No. 11 Michigan State	L 48–58	21–4 (9–3)	Value City Arena (18,809); Columbus, OH
February 14; 9:00 pm, ESPN	No. 6	at Minnesota	W 78–68	22–4 (10–3)	Williams Arena (13,245); Minneapolis, MN
February 18; 9:00 pm, ESPN	No. 6	at No. 17 Michigan; ESPN College GameDay	L 51–56	22–5 (10–4)	Crisler Arena (12,721); Ann Arbor, MI
February 21; 7:00 pm, ESPN	No. 8	Illinois	W 83–67	23–5 (11–4)	Value City Arena (18,481); Columbus, OH
February 26; 4:00 pm, CBS	No. 8	No. 16 Wisconsin	L 60–63	23–6 (11–5)	Value City Arena (18,809); Columbus, OH
February 29; 8:30 pm, BTN	No. 10	at Northwestern	W 75–73	24–6 (12–5)	Welsh–Ryan Arena (8,117); Evanston, IL
March 4; 4:00 pm, CBS	No. 10	at No. 5 Michigan State	W 72–70	25–6 (13–5)	Breslin Center (14,797); East Lansing, MI
Big Ten tournament
March 9; 8:55 pm, BTN	No. 7	vs. Purdue; Quarterfinals	W 88–71	26–6	Bankers Life Fieldhouse (18,484); Indianapolis, IN
March 10; 4:10 pm, CBS	No. 7	vs. No. 10 Michigan; Semifinals	W 77–55	27–6	Bankers Life Fieldhouse (18,451); Indianapolis, IN
March 11; 3:30 pm, CBS	No. 7	vs. No. 8 Michigan State; Championship Game	L 64–68	27–7	Bankers Life Fieldhouse (17,125); Indianapolis, IN
NCAA tournament
March 15*; 9:50 pm, TNT	No. 7 (2-E)	vs. (15-E) Loyola (MD); Second Round	W 78–59	28–7	CONSOL Energy Center (19,413); Pittsburgh, PA
March 17*; 2:45 pm, CBS	No. 7 (2-E)	vs. (7-E) Gonzaga; Third Round	W 73–66	29–7	CONSOL Energy Center (18,588); Pittsburgh, PA
March 22*; 9:45 pm, CBS	No. 7 (2-E)	vs. (6-E) Cincinnati; Sweet Sixteen	W 81–66	30–7	TD Garden (18,796); Boston, MA
March 24*; 7:05 pm, CBS	No. 7 (2-E)	vs. No. 2 (1-E) Syracuse; Elite Eight	W 77–70	31–7	TD Garden (18,796); Boston, MA
March 31*; 9:05 pm, CBS	No. 7 (2-E)	vs. No. 6 (2-M) Kansas; Final Four	L 62–64	31–8	Mercedes-Benz Superdome (73,361); New Orleans, LA
*Non-conference game. ^{#}Rankings from AP Poll. (#) Tournament seedings in parentheses. All times are in Eastern Time Rank indicates seed in the NCAA tournament. E-East region, W-West region, S-South region, M-Midewest Region.

== Rankings ==
Regular season polls
Poll	Pre- season	Week 1	Week 2	Week 3	Week 4	Week 5	Week 6	Week 7	Week 8	Week 9	Week 10	Week 11	Week 12	Week 13	Week 14	Week 15	Week 16	Week 17	Week 18	Week 19	Final
AP	3	3	3	3	2	2	2	2	2	6	5	6	4	3	3	6	8	10	7	7	
Coaches	3	3	3	3	2	2	2	2	2	7	5	6	4	3	3	6	9	11	7	7	3

Legend
	Increase in ranking
	Decrease in ranking
	Not ranked previous week
(RV)	Received votes
