= 2012–13 Big Ten Conference men's basketball season =

- League: NCAA Division I
- Sport: Basketball
- Teams: 12
- TV partner(s): Big Ten Network, ESPN, CBS

2012–13 NCAA Division I men's basketball season
- Regular season champions: Indiana
- Runners-up: Ohio State; Michigan State
- Season MVP: Trey Burke

Tournament
- Venue: United Center, Chicago, Illinois
- Champions: Ohio State
- Runners-up: Wisconsin
- Finals MVP: Aaron Craft

Basketball seasons
- 2011–12 2013–14

2012–13 Big Ten Conference men's basketball standings
	Conf.				Overall
Team	W		L	PCT	W		L	PCT
No. 4 Indiana	14	–	4	.778	29	–	7	.806
No. 7 Ohio State †	13	–	5	.722	29	–	8	.784
No. 9 Michigan State	13	–	5	.722	27	–	9	.750
No. 10 Michigan	12	–	6	.667	31	–	8	.795
No. 18 Wisconsin	12	–	6	.667	23	–	12	.657
Iowa	9	–	9	.500	25	–	13	.658
Illinois	8	–	10	.444	23	–	13	.639
Minnesota	8	–	10	.444	21	–	13	.618
Purdue	8	–	10	.444	16	–	18	.471
Nebraska	5	–	13	.278	15	–	18	.455
Northwestern	4	–	14	.222	13	–	19	.406
Penn State	2	–	16	.111	10	–	21	.323
† 2013 Big Ten tournament winner Rankings from AP Poll

The 2012–13 Big Ten men's basketball season began with practices in October 2012, followed by the start of the 2012–13 NCAA Division I men's basketball season in November. Conference play began in early-January 2013, and concluded in March with the 2013 Big Ten men's basketball tournament at the United Center in Chicago. All conference regular season and tournament games were broadcast nationally. For the 37th consecutive season, the conference led the nation in attendance.

The conference enjoyed nine postseason invitations including seven to the 2013 NCAA Men's Division I Basketball Tournament (NCAA Tournament). Eight of the nine postseason participants posted at least one win. The Conference compiled a 19–9 postseason record including a 14–7 record in the NCAA Tournament. Michigan was runner up in the NCAA Tournament and Iowa was runner-up in the 2013 National Invitation Tournament.

Big Ten Conference Men's Basketball Player of the Year Trey Burke won most National Player of the Year awards (Oscar Robertson Trophy, John R. Wooden Award, Associated Press POY, Sports Illustrated POY, NABC Player of the Year and Naismith College Player of the Year), while Big Ten Defensive Player of the Year Victor Oladipo won the Sporting News POY and Adolph Rupp Trophy. Oladipo also shared NABC Defensive Player of the Year with Jeff Withey. Four Big Ten athletes (Burke, Oladipo, Cody Zeller and Deshaun Thomas) earned 2013 NCAA All-American recognition (Burke, Oladipo and Zeller as consensus All-Americans). In addition, Jordan Hulls won the Senior CLASS Award and Aaron Craft earned Men's Basketball Academic All-American of the Year with Cody Zeller and Jordan Hulls also earning first and third team Academic All-America recognition, respectively. Craft was the Most Outstanding Player at the 2013 Big Ten tournament and national defensive player of the year per CBSSports.com. Burke also earned the Bob Cousy Award.

With Oladipo, Zeller and Burke being selected 2nd, 4th and 9th respectively in the 2013 NBA draft, the Big Ten had its first trio of top ten selections since the 1990 NBA draft. All five players who declared early for were drafted (Hardaway 24th and Thomas 58th).

== Preseason ==
Five teams were ranked in the preseason AP Poll and USA Today/ESPN Coaches' poll: Indiana (number 1 AP/number 1 Coaches), Ohio State (4/4) Michigan (5/5), Michigan State (14/14) and Wisconsin (23/21). Minnesota was also receiving votes.

=== Preseason watchlists ===
Below are lists selected by notable committees prior to the season that represent what they anticipate to be the most likely candidates to be recognized at the end of the season for their specific awards. They are called watchlists because they are lists of players to watch for each award.

	Wooden	Naismith	Senior CLASS
Brandon Paul ILL	✓		✓
Christian Watford IND	✓	✓	
Cody Zeller IND	✓	✓	
Jordan Hulls IND			✓
Trey Burke MICH	✓	✓	
Tim Hardaway Jr. MICH	✓		
Keith Appling MSU	✓		
Trevor Mbakwe MINN		✓	
Drew Crawford NW			✓
Aaron Craft OSU	✓	✓	
Deshaun Thomas OSU	✓	✓	
Tim Frazier PSU	✓	✓	✓
Jared Berggren WIS			✓

=== Preseason honors ===
The following players were selected to the CBS Sports, Associated Press, Sporting News and ESPN preseason All-American teams and the preseason media All-Big Ten team.

	CBS	AP	TSN	ESPN	SI	Big Ten
Cody Zeller	POY	1st	1st	1st	1st	POY
Deshaun Thomas	3rd	1st	1st	1st	1st	✓
Trey Burke	2nd	1st	3rd	2nd	2nd	✓
Trevor Mbakwe	3rd					
Aaron Craft	3rd				2nd	✓
Tim Frazier						✓

=== Preseason national polls ===
	AP	Coaches	SI	Athlon	Lindy's	Sporting News	Blue Ribbon
Illinois							
Indiana	1	1	1	1	2	1	1
Iowa							
Michigan	5	5	6	6	3	5	5
Michigan State	14	14	13	10	16	22	7
Minnesota							
Nebraska							
Northwestern							
Ohio State	4	4	7	8	6	3	17
Penn State							
Purdue							
Wisconsin	23	21	22		23	17	23

== Preconference schedules ==
Ohio State won the four-team Hall of Fame Tipoff tournament on November 18 at Mohegan Sun Arena. Indiana won the four-team Legends Classic on November 20 at Barclays Center. Illinois won the eight-team Maui Invitational Tournament on November 21 at Lahaina Civic Center. Michigan won the sixteen-team NIT Season Tip-off tournament on November 23 at Madison Square Garden. On November 24, Northwestern won the four-team South Padre Island Invitational.

=== Early-season tournament victories ===
Name	Dates	No. teams	Champion
NIT Season Tip-Off	November 12–13, 21, 23	16	Michigan
Hall of Fame Tipoff	November 16–18	4	Ohio State
Legends Classic	November 19–20	4*	Indiana
Maui Invitational tournament	November 19–21	8	Illinois
South Padre Island Invitational	November 23, 24	8	Northwestern

*Although these tournaments include more teams, only the number listed play for the championship.

=== 2012 ACC–Big Ten Challenge ===
ACC–Big Ten Challenge results:

Date	Time	ACC Team	Big Ten Team	Location	Television	Attendance	Winner	Challenge Leader
November 27, 2012	7:15 pm	Virginia Tech	Iowa	Cassell Coliseum • Blacksburg, VA	ESPNU	5,647	Virginia Tech (95–79)	ACC (1–0)
November 27, 2012	7:15 pm	Florida State	#21 Minnesota	Donald L. Tucker Center • Tallahassee, FL	ESPN2	7,941	Minnesota (77–68)	Tied (1–1)
November 27, 2012	7:30 pm	#18 NC State	#3 Michigan	Crisler Arena • Ann Arbor, MI	ESPN	12,693	Michigan (79–72)	Big Ten (2–1)
November 27, 2012	9:15 pm	Wake Forest	Nebraska	LJVM Coliseum • Winston-Salem, NC	ESPNU	6,508	Nebraska (79–63)	Big Ten (3–1)
November 27, 2012	9:15 pm	Maryland	Northwestern	Welsh-Ryan Arena • Evanston, IL	ESPN2	6,009	Maryland (77–57)	Big Ten (3–2)
November 27, 2012	9:30 pm	#14 North Carolina	#1 Indiana	Assembly Hall • Bloomington, IN	ESPN	17,472	Indiana (83–59)	Big Ten (4–2)
November 28, 2012	7:00 pm	Virginia	Wisconsin	Kohl Center • Madison, WI	ESPN2	16,690	Virginia (60–54)	Big Ten (4–3)
November 28, 2012	7:15 pm	Clemson	Purdue	Littlejohn Coliseum • Clemson, SC	ESPNU	7,632	Purdue (73–61)	Big Ten (5–3)
November 28, 2012	7:30 pm	Miami	#13 Michigan State	BankUnited Center • Coral Gables, FL	ESPN	5,791	Miami (67–59)	Big Ten (5–4)
November 28, 2012	9:00 pm	Georgia Tech	#22 Illinois	Assembly Hall • Champaign, IL	ESPN2	12,224	Illinois (75–62)	Big Ten (6–4)
November 28, 2012	9:15 pm	Boston College	Penn State	Bryce Jordan Center • University Park, PA	ESPNU	6,889	Boston College (73–61)	Big Ten (6–5)
November 28, 2012	9:30 pm	#2 Duke	#4 Ohio State	Cameron Indoor Stadium • Durham, NC	ESPN	9,314	Duke (73–68)	Tied (6–6)

*All Times Eastern

== Rankings ==
Legend
	Improvement in ranking
	Drop in ranking
	Not ranked previous week
RV	Received votes but were not ranked in Top 25 of poll

		Pre/ Wk 1	Wk 2	Wk 3	Wk 4	Wk 5	Wk 6	Wk 7	Wk 8	Wk 9	Wk 10	Wk 11	Wk 12	Wk 13	Wk 14	Wk 15	Wk 16	Wk 17	Wk 18	Wk 19	Wk 20	Final
Illinois	AP				22	13	10	10	12	11	12	23				RV	RV	RV	RV			
Illinois	C				22	14	10	10	15	14	13	22	RV			RV	RV	RV	RV			RV
Indiana	AP	1 (43)	1 (46)	1 (46)	1 (47)	1 (45)	1 (44)	6	5	5	5	2 (13)	7	3	1 (58)	1 (26)	1 (43)	1 (64)	2 (7)	3	4	
Indiana	C	1 (21)	1 (25)	1 (26)	1 (27)	1 (25)	1 (25)	6	5	5	5	2 (6)	8	3	1 (25)	2 (6)	1 (19)	1 (28)	2	3	4	7
Iowa	AP																					
Iowa	C																					RV
Michigan	AP	5	5	4	3	3	3	2 (3)	2 (2)	2 (2)	2 (3)	5 (1)	2 (11)	1 (51)	3	4	7	4	7	6	T10	
Michigan	C	5	5	4	3	3	3	2 (1)	2 (1)	2 (1)	2 (1)	5	3 (1)	2 (14)	3	5 (1)	7	4	8	8	11	2
Michigan State	AP	14	21	15	13	19	19	20	19	18	22	18	13	13	12	8	4	9	10	8	9	
Michigan State	C	14	22	19	14	17	19	T19	19	18	18	17	11	9	8	8	5	10	12	7	9	13
Minnesota	AP	RV	RV	RV	21	14	13	13	11	9	8	9	12	23	18	RV	RV		RV			
Minnesota	C	RV	RV	RV	RV	21	16	16	14	13	10	12	14	24	18	RV	RV		RV			RV
Nebraska	AP																					
Nebraska	C																					
Northwestern	AP																					
Northwestern	C																					
Ohio State	AP	4	4	3	4	7	7	7	10	8	15	11	14	11	10	13	18	16	14	10	7	
Ohio State	C	4	4	3	4	7	7	7	10	8	14	11	15	11	10	14	18	15	13	9	6	6
Penn State	AP																					
Penn State	C																					
Purdue	AP																					
Purdue	C																					
Wisconsin	AP	23	22	RV	RV							RV	RV	RV	RV	20	19	17	22	22	18	
Wisconsin	C	21	20	24	RV							RV	RV	RV	RV	19	17	16	21	23	17	22

By achieving high rankings throughout the season, the Big Ten was able to keep at least three teams in the top 10 of the national polls during 10 of the 11 weeks of the conference portion of the season. As a result, the Big Ten set a record for most matchups between two top 10 opponents in conference play with a total of 9 such games. Michigan played in six with a 3–3 record and Indiana played in five, winning all of them. Michigan State, Minnesota and Ohio State also played in top 10 games.

== Conference Schedules ==
Before the season, it was announced that for the sixth consecutive season, all regular season conference games and conference tournament games would be broadcast nationally by CBS Sports, ESPN Inc. family of networks including ESPN, ESPN2 and ESPNU, and the Big Ten Network. During the season, the Big Ten led the nation in attendance for the 37th consecutive season with an average attendance of 13,114, which paced the nation's conferences by over 2,400 per game. The conference had 7 of the top 25 schools in terms of average attendance: Indiana (5th, 17,412), Wisconsin (7th, 16,843), Ohio State (9th, 16,524), Illinois (17th, 15,013), Michigan State (18th, 14,341), Iowa (21st, 13,625) and Minnesota (23rd, 12,580). The Big Ten distanced itself from other conferences: Big East (10, 699), SEC (10,571), Big 12 (10,289), and ACC (9,990).

=== Conference matrix ===
This table summarizes the head-to-head results between teams in conference play. (x) indicates games remaining this season.

	Illinois	Indiana	Iowa	Michigan	Michigan St	Minnesota	Nebraska	Northwestern	Ohio State	Penn State	Purdue	Wisconsin
vs. Illinois	–	0–1	1–0	2–0	1–0	1–1	0–2	1–1	1–1	0–1	1–1	2–0
vs. Indiana	1–0	–	0–2	0–2	0–2	1–1	0–1	0–1	1–1	0–2	0–2	1–0
vs. Iowa	0–1	2–0	–	1–0	1–0	1–1	1–1	0–2	1–0	0–2	1–1	1–1
vs. Michigan	0–2	2–0	0–1	–	1–1	0–1	0–1	0–2	1–1	1–1	0–2	1–0
vs. Michigan State	0–1	2–0	0–1	1–1	–	1–1	0–2	0–1	1–1	0–1	0–2	0–2
vs. Minnesota	1–1	1–1	1–1	1–0	1–1	–	1–1	1–1	1–0	0–1	1–0	1–1
vs. Nebraska	2–0	1–0	1–1	1–0	2–0	1–1	–	0–1	2–0	0–2	1–0	2–0
vs. Northwestern	1–1	1–0	2–0	2–0	1–0	1–1	1–0	–	2–0	1–1	1–1	1–0
vs. Ohio State	1–1	1–1	0–1	1–1	1–1	0–1	0–2	0–2	–	0–1	0–1	1–1
vs. Penn State	1–0	2–0	2–0	1–1	1–0	1–0	2–0	1–1	1–0	–	2–0	2–0
vs. Purdue	1–1	2–0	1–1	2–0	2–0	0–1	0–1	1–1	1–0	0–2	–	0–1
vs. Wisconsin	0–2	0–1	1–1	0–1	2–0	1–1	0–2	0–1	1–1	0–2	1–0	–
Total	8–10	14–4	9–9	12–6	13–5	8–10	5–13	4–14	13–5	2–16	8–10	12–6

On February 2, 2013, Michigan (number 1 AP/number 2 Coaches) and Indiana (3/3) appeared on ESPN's College GameDay at Assembly Hall. Indiana won 81–73, and the television broadcast of the game on ESPN set a Big Ten record for viewership with 4.035 million viewers.

The Iowa vs. Nebraska game, scheduled for February 21, 2013 at the Devany Center, was rescheduled for February 23 due to a winter storm.

== Big Ten tournament seeding ==
These are the Big Ten standings including tiebreakers and conference tournament games. Bold indicates the winner of the Big Ten tournament.

Legend
Clinched first round bye in the Big Ten tournament
Played in first round of the Big Ten tournament

Seed	School	Conf*	Tiebreak 1	Tiebreak 2	Conf**
#1	Indiana	14–4			15–5
#2	**Ohio State**	13–5	1–1 vs. MSU	1–1 vs. IND	16–5
#3	Michigan State	13–5	1–1 vs. OSU	0–2 vs. IND	14–6
#4	Wisconsin	12–6	1–0 vs. MICH		14–7
#5	Michigan	12–6	0–1 vs. WIS		13–7
#6	Iowa	9–9			10–10
#7	Purdue	8–10	2–1 vs. ILL/MIN		8–11
#8	Illinois	8–10	2–2 vs. MIN/PUR		9–11
#9	Minnesota	8–10	1–2 vs. ILL/PUR		8–11
#10	Nebraska	5–13			6–14
#11	Northwestern	4–14			4–15
#12	Penn State	2–16			2–17

*Regular season record
**Conference record including Big Ten tournament games

All tournament games were nationally broadcast. The tournament set an attendance record with 124,000 spectators attending 6 sessions, shattering the 109,769 total set for the 2001 tournament.

== Player of the week ==
Players of the week

Throughout the conference regular season, the Big Ten offices named one or two players of the week each Monday.

Week	Player of the week	Freshman of the week
November 12, 2012	Tim Hardaway Jr., MICH	Yogi Ferrell, IND
November 19, 2012	Deshaun Thomas, OSU	Gary Harris, MSU
November 26, 2012	Andre Hollins, MINN	Nik Stauskas, MICH
December 3, 2012	Andre Almeida, NEB	Nik Stauskas (2), MICH
December 10, 2012	Brandon Paul, ILL	Gary Harris (2), MSU
December 17, 2012	Trey Burke, MICH	Mike Gesell, IOWA
December 24, 2012	Derrick Nix, MSU	Mitch McGary, MICH
December 31, 2012	Tracy Abrams, ILL	Nik Stauskas (3), MICH
January 7, 2013	Trey Burke (2), MICH	Glenn Robinson III, MICH
January 14, 2013	Cody Zeller, IND	Sam Dekker, WIS
January 14, 2013	Deshaun Thomas (2), OSU	Sam Dekker, WIS
January 21, 2013	Tim Hardaway Jr. (2), MICH	Shavon Shields, NEB
January 28, 2013	Victor Oladipo, IND	Glenn Robinson III (2), MICH
February 4, 2013	Cody Zeller (2), IND	A. J. Hammons, PUR
February 4, 2013	Keith Appling, MSU	A. J. Hammons, PUR
February 11, 2013	D. J. Richardson, ILL	Mitch McGary (2), MICH
February 11, 2013	Ben Brust, WIS	Mitch McGary (2), MICH
February 18, 2013	Trey Burke (3), MICH	Gary Harris (3), MSU
February 25, 2013	Victor Oladipo (2), IND	Shavon Shields (2), NEB
March 4, 2013	Trevor Mbakwe, MINN	Yogi Ferrell (2), IND
March 4, 2013	Trevor Mbakwe, MINN	Sam Dekker (2), WIS
March 11, 2013	Cody Zeller (3), IND	Raphael Davis, PUR
March 11, 2013	Aaron Craft, OSU	Raphael Davis, PUR

On December 11, Paul also earned United States Basketball Writers Association Oscar Robertson National Player of the Week recognition. On January 8, Burke earned the Oscar Robertson National Players of the Week. On April 1, Burke earned ESPN.com Player of the Week recognition.

== Postseason ==
=== Big Ten tournament ===
- March 14–17, 2013 Big Ten Conference men's basketball tournament, United Center, Chicago, IL.

2013 Big Ten Conference men's basketball tournament seeds and results
Seed	School	Conf.	Over.	Tiebreaker	First round March 14	Quarterfinals March 15	Semifinals March 16	Championship March 17
1.	Indiana ‡ #	14–4	27–6		Bye	Defeated Illinois 80–64	Eliminated by Wisconsin 68–56	
2.	Ohio State #	13–5	26–7		Bye	Defeated Nebraska 71–50	Defeated Michigan State 61–58	Defeated Wisconsin 50–43
3.	Michigan State #	13–5	25–8		Bye	Defeated Iowa 59–56	Eliminated by Ohio State 61–58	
4.	Wisconsin #	12–6	23–11		Bye	Defeated Michigan 68–59	Defeated Indiana 68–56	Eliminated by Ohio State 50–43
5.	Michigan	12–6	26–7		Defeated Penn State 83–66	Eliminated by Wisconsin 59–68		
6.	Iowa	9–9	21–12		Defeated Northwestern 73–59	Eliminated by Michigan State 59–56		
7.	Purdue	8–10	15–17		Eliminated by Nebraska 55–57			
8.	Illinois	8–10	22–12		Defeated Minnesota 51–49	Eliminated by Indiana 64–80		
9.	Minnesota	8–10	20–12		Eliminated by Illinois 49–51			
10.	Nebraska	5–13	15–18		Defeated Purdue 57–55	Eliminated by Ohio State 71–50		
11.	Northwestern	4–14	13–19		Eliminated by Iowa 59–73			
12.	Penn State	2–16	10–21		Eliminated by Michigan 66–83			
‡ – Big Ten regular season champions, and tournament No. 1 seed. # – Received a bye in the conference tournament. Overall records include all games played in the Big Ten tournament.

=== NCAA tournament ===
Seed	Region	School	Round of 64	Round of 32	Sweet 16	Elite Eight	Final Four	Championship
1	East	Indiana	Defeated James Madison 83–62	Defeated Temple 58–52	Eliminated by Syracuse 61–50			
2	West	Ohio State	Defeated Iona 95–70	Defeated Iowa State 78–75	Defeated Arizona 73–70	Eliminated by Wichita State 70–66		
3	Midwest	Michigan State	Defeated Valparaiso 65–54	Defeated Memphis 70–48	Eliminated by Duke 71–61			
4	South	Michigan	Defeated South Dakota St. 71–56	Defeated VCU 78–53	Defeated Kansas 87–85 OT	Defeated Florida 79–59	Defeated Syracuse 61–56	Eliminated by Louisville 82–76
5	West	Wisconsin	Eliminated by Ole Miss 57–46					
7	East	Illinois	Defeated Colorado 57–49	Eliminated by Miami (FL) 63–59				
11	South	Minnesota	Defeated UCLA 83–63	Eliminated by Florida 78–64				
		W-L (%):	6–1 (.857)	4–2 (.667)	2–2 (.500)	1–1 (.500)	1–0 (1.000)	0–1 (.000) Total: 14–7 (.667)

The Big Ten entered seven teams in the 2013 NCAA Men's Division I Basketball Tournament, ranging from Indiana making its 37th trip and earning a number one seed to Minnesota making its 8th appearance and earningn an eleven seed. The Big Ten became the first conference to send four teams to the Sweet Sixteen in back-to-back years since the 1997 and 1998 tournaments. Although it was the Big Ten's fifth time advancing four teams, it was the first time with consecutive occurrences. Entering Sweet Sixteen round with four strong contenders spread across four regions, there was talk of the conference matching or surpassing the 1985 Big East Conference performance with three final four entrants. Only Michigan advanced. Burke was named South Regional Tournament Most Outstanding Player. Michigan made its fourth appearance in the final four, giving the conference a total of 43 such appearances. Michigan was part of the highest attendance National Championship game to date with an attendance of 74,326.

=== National Invitation tournament ===
Seed	Region	School	First round	Second round	Quarterfinals	Semifinals	Finals
3	Virginia	Iowa	Defeated Indiana State 68–52	Defeated Stony Brook 75–63	Defeated Virginia 75–64	Defeated Maryland 71–60	Eliminated by Baylor 74–54
		W-L (%):	1–0 (1.000)	1–0 (1.000)	1–0 (1.000)	1–0 (1.000)	0–1 (.000) Total: 4–1 (.800)

Iowa made the school's first trip to the NIT semifinals at Madison Square Garden and marked the conference's second consecutive year sending a team to the semifinals.

=== College Basketball Invitational ===
School	First round	Quarterfinals	Semifinals	Finals (Best of 3)
Purdue	Defeated Western Illinois 81–67	Eliminated by Santa Clara 86–83		
W-L (%):	1–0 (1.000)	0–1 (.000)	0–0 (–)	0–0 (–) Total: 1–1 (.500)

=== CollegeInsider.com Postseason tournament ===
There were no entrants from the Big Ten Conference in the CollegeInsider.com Postseason Tournament.

=== 2013 NBA draft ===
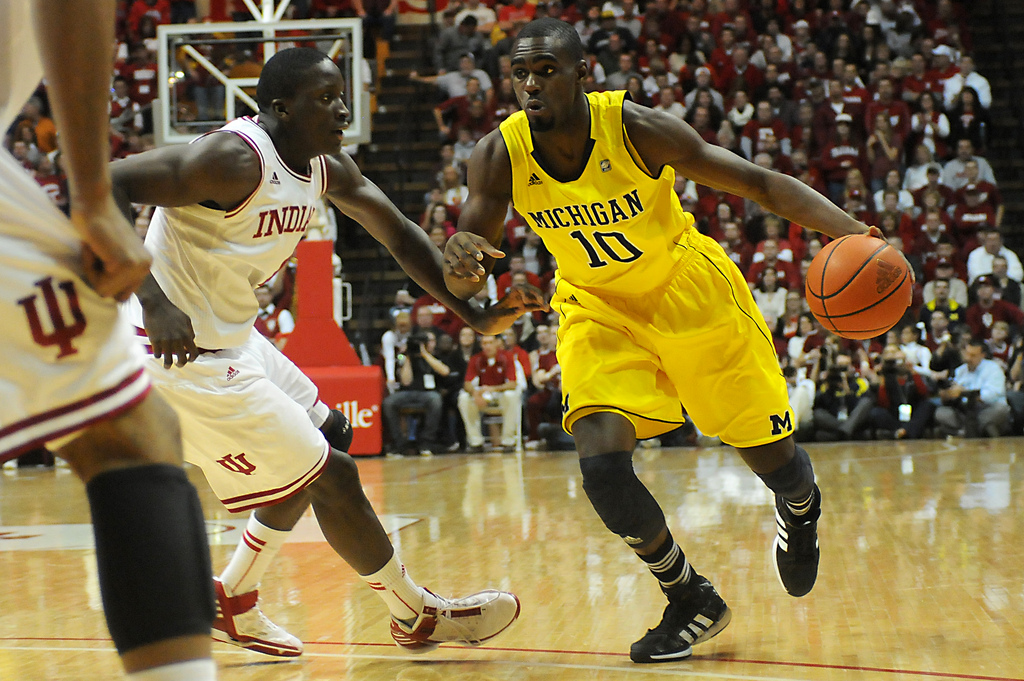
Victor Oladipo defending fellow 2013 NBA Draftee Tim Hardaway Jr.

Junior Deshaun Thomas declared for the draft on April 5. On April 9, junior Oladipo entered the draft. On April 10 sophomore Zeller announced plans to enter the draft. On April 14, sophomore Burke entered the Draft. On April 17, Hardaway declared for the NBA draft. Those 5 first team All-Big Ten selections were the only players from the conference to declare early for the NBA draft. Burke, Hardaway, Trevor Mbakwe, Oladipo, Brandon Paul, Thomas, and Zeller were among the 60 players invited to the 2013 NBA Draft Combine. The following all-conference selections were listed as seniors: Jared Berggren, Mbakwe, Paul, Christian Watford and D. J. Richardson.

Victor Oladipo (2nd), Cody Zeller (4th) and Burke (9th) combined to give the Big Ten its first top ten trio since the 1990 NBA draft. Hardaway (24th) joined his father (14th in 1989 NBA draft) as a first round selection.

PG	Point guard	SG	Shooting guard	SF	Small forward	PF	Power forward	C	Center

Round	Pick	Player	Position	Nationality	Team	School/club team
1	2	Victor Oladipo	SG	United States	Orlando Magic	Indiana (Jr.)
1	4	Cody Zeller	PF	United States	Charlotte Bobcats	Indiana (So.)
1	9	Trey Burke	PG	United States	Minnesota Timberwolves (traded to Utah) (Note: The Minnesota Timberwolves traded 9th pick Trey Burke to the Utah Jazz in exchange for the 14th pick Shabazz Muhammad and the 21st pick Gorgui Dieng.)	Michigan (So.)
1	24	Tim Hardaway Jr.	SG	United States	New York Knicks	Michigan (Jr.)
2	58	Deshaun Thomas	SF	United States	San Antonio Spurs	Ohio State (Jr.)

The following trades involving drafted players were made on the day of the draft.

== Honors and awards ==
=== Watchlists ===
On January 9, 4 Big Ten points guards (Burke, Keith Appling, Craft and Andre Hollins) among the 20 Cousy Award finalists. On January 10 the Wooden Award midseason top 25 list was announced and it included Burke, Brandon Paul and Deshaun Thomas. On January 31, Burke, Victor Oladipo, Thomas and Cody Zeller were named to the Oscar Robertson Trophy (USBWA National Player of the Year) midseason top 12 list, while Yogi Ferrell, Glenn Robinson III and Nik Stauskas were named to the Wayman Tisdale Award (USBWA National Freshman of the Year) top 12 midseason list. Jared Berggren, Aaron Craft, Jordan Hulls and Zeller were first team All-District selections placing them among the 40 candidates for the 15-man Academic All-American team. On February 26, Oladipo, Zeller, Thomas, Paul, Burke and Berggren were among the top 30 finalists for the Naismith Award. On March 4, Burke, Oladipo, Thomas and Zeller were announced on the 14-man Robertson watchlist, while Gary Harris was among 8 players on the Tisdale watchlist. On March 9, Burke, Oladipo, Thomas and Zeller were named as top 15 Wooden Award finalists. On March 11, Burke was named one of five finalists for the Cousy Award. On March 24, Burke and Oladipo was named among four finalists for the Naismith Award.

=== All-Americans ===
Jordan Hulls was named a finalist for the Senior CLASS Award, making him one of ten Senior All-Americans. Craft, a repeat Academic All-America selection, was named the Men's Basketball Academic All-America Team Members of the Year. He was joined on the Academic All-America first team by Zeller, and Hulls was a third team selection.

Burke and Oladipo were named a first-team All-American by Sporting News (TSN) on March 11, while Thomas was a second-team selection and Zeller was named to the third-team. Burke and Oladipo were also named to the first team by the USBWA On March 18, while Zeller was named to its second team. Burke and Zeller were named All-American by Sports Illustrated (SI) on March 19. On March 20 Burke and Oladipo were named to the CBSSports.com All-American first team, while Thomas was a second team selection, Zeller was a third team selection and Craft was Defensive Player of the Year. On March 26, Burke, Oladipo, Thomas, and Zeller were selected to the 21-man 2013 Lute Olson All-America Team. On March 28, Burke and Oladipo were named first team All-American by the NABC, while Zeller was a second team selection and Thomas was a third team selection. On April 1, the Associated Press gave the Big Ten the same recognitions as the NABC: 1st team: Burke and Oladipo, 2nd team: Zeller and 3rd team: Thomas. On the same day, Burke, Oladipo, Zeller and Thomas were named to the 10-man Wooden All-American team of finalists for the Wooden Award. Also on April 1, Glenn Robinson III and Gary Harris were named to the 21-man 2013 Kyle Macy Freshman All-America team.

=== National awards ===
TSN named Oladipo National Player of the Year on March 13. SI also named Burke National Player of the Year on the 19th. On April 4, Burke was named Associated Press College Basketball Player of the Year. Burke also won the Bob Cousy Award on April 4. On April 5, Burke won the Oscar Robertson Trophy from the USBWA as well as the John R. Wooden Award. Jordan Hulls won the Senior CLASS Award. On April 7, Burke won the NABC Player of the Year and Naismith College Player of the Year awards. Oladipo was named co-National Defensive Player of the Year (along with Jeff Withey) by the NABC. Oladipo also won the Adolph Rupp Trophy.

=== All-Big Ten Awards and Teams ===
On March 11, The Big Ten announced most of its conference awards. On March 27, 38 Big Ten men's basketball players were recognized as Winter Academic All-Big Ten honorees for maintaining 3.0 averages.

Honor	Coaches	Media
Player of the Year	Trey Burke, Michigan	Trey Burke, Michigan
Coach of the Year	Bo Ryan, Wisconsin	Bo Ryan, Wisconsin
Freshman of the Year	Gary Harris, Michigan State	Gary Harris, Michigan State
Defensive Player of the Year	Victor Oladipo, Indiana	Not Selected
Sixth Man of the Year	Will Sheehey, Indiana	Not Selected
All-Big Ten First Team	Trey Burke, Michigan	Trey Burke, Michigan
All-Big Ten First Team	Victor Oladipo, Indiana	Victor Oladipo, Indiana
All-Big Ten First Team	Cody Zeller, Indiana	Cody Zeller, Indiana
All-Big Ten First Team	Deshaun Thomas, Ohio State	Deshaun Thomas, Ohio State
All-Big Ten First Team	Tim Hardaway Jr., Michigan	Aaron Craft, Ohio State
All-Big Ten Second Team	Aaron Craft, Ohio State	Tim Hardaway Jr., Michigan
All-Big Ten Second Team	Gary Harris, Michigan State	Gary Harris, Michigan State
All-Big Ten Second Team	Adreian Payne, Michigan State	Adreian Payne, Michigan State
All-Big Ten Second Team	Jared Berggren, Wisconsin	Jared Berggren, Wisconsin
All-Big Ten Second Team	Keith Appling, Michigan State	Trevor Mbakwe, Minnesota
All-Big Ten Third Team	Trevor Mbakwe, Minnesota	Keith Appling, Michigan State
All-Big Ten Third Team	Brandon Paul, Illinois	Brandon Paul, Illinois
All-Big Ten Third Team	Christian Watford, Indiana	Christian Watford, Indiana
All-Big Ten Third Team	D. J. Richardson, Illinois	Andre Hollins, Minnesota
All-Big Ten Third Team	Roy Devyn Marble, Iowa	Aaron White, Iowa
All-Big Ten Third Team	Terone Johnson, Purdue	
All-Big Ten Honorable Mention	Aaron White, Iowa	D. J. Richardson, Illinois
All-Big Ten Honorable Mention	Andre Hollins, Minnesota	Roy Devyn Marble, Iowa
All-Big Ten Honorable Mention	Jordan Hulls, Indiana	Jordan Hulls, Indiana
All-Big Ten Honorable Mention	Dylan Talley, Nebraska	Dylan Talley, Nebraska
All-Big Ten Honorable Mention	Jermaine Marshall, Penn State	Jermaine Marshall, Penn State
All-Big Ten Honorable Mention	D. J. Newbill, Penn State	D. J. Newbill, Penn State
All-Big Ten Honorable Mention	Ben Brust, Wisconsin	Ben Brust, Wisconsin
All-Big Ten Honorable Mention	Derrick Nix, Michigan State	Terone Johnson, Purdue
All-Big Ten Honorable Mention		Yogi Ferrell, Indiana
All-Big Ten Honorable Mention		Glenn Robinson III, Michigan
All-Big Ten Honorable Mention		Reggie Hearn, Northwestern
All-Big Ten Honorable Mention		D. J. Byrd, Purdue
All-Big Ten Honorable Mention		Sam Dekker, Wisconsin
All-Freshman Team	Yogi Ferrell, Indiana	Not Selected
All-Freshman Team	Glenn Robinson III, Michigan	Not Selected
All-Freshman Team	Sam Dekker, Wisconsin	Not Selected
All-Freshman Team	Gary Harris, Michigan State	Not Selected
All-Freshman Team	A. J. Hammons, Purdue	Not Selected
All-Defensive Team	Victor Oladipo, Indiana	Not Selected
All-Defensive Team	Jordan Morgan, Michigan	Not Selected
All-Defensive Team	Aaron Craft, Ohio State	Not Selected
All-Defensive Team	Shannon Scott, Ohio State	Not Selected
All-Defensive Team	Jared Berggren, Wisconsin	Not Selected

=== USBWA ===
On March 12, the U.S. Basketball Writers Association released its 2012–13 Men's All-District Teams, based upon voting from its national membership. There were nine regions from coast to coast, and a player and coach of the year were selected in each. The following lists all the Big Ten representatives selected within their respective regions.

District II (NY, NJ, DE, DC, PA, WV)

None Selected

District V (OH, IN, IL, MI, MN, WI)

Player of the Year

- Trey Burke, Michigan

Coach of the Year

- Tom Crean, Indiana

All-District Team

- Trey Burke, Michigan
- Cody Zeller, Indiana
- Brandon Paul, Illinois
- Victor Oladipo, Indiana
- Tim Hardaway Jr., Michigan
- Trevor Mbakwe, Minnesota
- Aaron Craft, Ohio State
- Deshaun Thomas, Ohio State
- Jared Berggren, Wisconsin
District VI (IA, MO, KS, OK, NE, ND, SD)

None Selected

=== NABC ===
The National Association of Basketball Coaches announced their Division I All-District teams on March 26, recognizing the nation's best men's collegiate basketball student-athletes. Selected and voted on by member coaches of the NABC, 240 student-athletes, from 24 districts were chosen. The selections on this list were then eligible for the State Farm Coaches' Division I All-America teams. The following list represented the District 7 players chosen to the list.

First Team

- Trey Burke, Michigan
- Cody Zeller, Indiana
- Victor Oladipo, Indiana
- Deshaun Thomas, Ohio State
- Tim Hardaway Jr., Michigan

Second Team

- Keith Appling, Michigan State
- Christian Watford, Indiana
- Aaron Craft, Ohio State
- Jared Berggren, Wisconsin
- Trevor Mbakwe, Minnesota

=== Coaching ===
Tom Izzo will be recognized with the 2013 Wayman Tisdale Humanitarian Award on April 15. John Beilein was selected as an assistant coach for the 2013 World University Games. Bo Ryan earned the NABC's Coaches vs. Cancer Champion Award.

=== USA Basketball ===
In addition to Beilein being a coach for the World University Games, the Big Ten was represented at the games by Yogi Ferrell, Will Sheehey, Aaron White and Adreian Payne.
