= 2011–12 Big Ten Conference men's basketball season =

- League: NCAA Division I
- Sport: Basketball
- Duration: December 27, 2011 – March 4, 2012
- Teams: 12
- TV partner(s): Big Ten Network, ESPN, CBS

2011-12 NCAA Division I season
- Regular season tri-champions: Michigan (13–5); Michigan State (13–5); Ohio State (13–5)
- Runners-Up: Wisconsin (12–6)
- Season MVP: Draymond Green

Tournament
- Venue: Bankers Life Fieldhouse, Indianapolis, Indiana
- Champions: Michigan State
- Runners-up: Ohio State
- Finals MVP: Draymond Green

Basketball seasons
- 2010–11 2012–13

2011–12 Big Ten Conference men's basketball standings
	Conf.				Overall
Team	W		L	PCT	W		L	PCT
No. 5 Michigan State†	13	–	5	.722	29	–	8	.784
No. 13 Michigan	13	–	5	.722	24	–	10	.706
No. 7 Ohio State	13	–	5	.722	31	–	8	.795
No. 14 Wisconsin	12	–	6	.667	26	–	10	.722
No. 16 Indiana	11	–	7	.611	27	–	9	.750
Purdue	10	–	8	.556	22	–	13	.629
Northwestern	8	–	10	.444	19	–	14	.576
Iowa	8	–	10	.444	18	–	17	.514
Illinois	6	–	12	.333	17	–	15	.531
Minnesota	6	–	12	.333	23	–	15	.605
Nebraska	4	–	14	.222	12	–	18	.400
Penn State	4	–	14	.222	12	–	20	.375
† 2012 Big Ten tournament winner Rankings from AP poll

The 2011–12 Big Ten Conference men's basketball season began with practices in October 2015, followed by the start of the 2015–16 NCAA Division I men's basketball season in November. The season marked the first season of participation of the Nebraska Cornhuskers men's basketball team in Big Ten competition. With the addition of Nebraska, all teams will play seven other teams twice and four teams once during the conference schedule, which continues to be 18 games. The season commenced on October 14 when Michigan State and Minnesota celebrated Midnight Madness and three more conference schools hosted events on the 15th. For the fifth consecutive season, all conference games were broadcast nationally with eight aired by CBS Sports, 36 carried by the ESPN Inc. family of networks including ESPN and ESPN2, while 64 games were carried by the Big Ten Network. The conference led the nation in attendance for the 36th consecutive season.

The regular season ended with Michigan, Michigan State and Ohio State tied for the league championship. Wisconsin finished in second place.

Michigan State's Draymond Green was named the Conference Player of the Year. Michigan State's Tom Izzo was named conference Coach of the Year. Green and Izzo both won their respective (player and coach) national awards from the National Association of Basketball Coaches. Green and Jared Sullinger were both recognized as 2012 NCAA Men's Basketball All-Americans. Robbie Hummel was awarded the Lowe's Senior CLASS Award. Aaron Craft won the Elite 89 Award. Craft (1st team), Drew Crawford (2nd team) and Zack Novak (3rd team) were named Academic All-America.

Bankers Life Fieldhouse in Indianapolis, Indiana hosted the Big Ten tournament from March 8–March 11. Michigan State defeated Ohio State in the championship game to win the tournament championship. Draymond Green was also named tournament MVP. As a result, the Spartans received the conference's automatic bid to the NCAA tournament. Six teams (Indiana, Michigan, Michigan State, Ohio State, Purdue, and Wisconsin) received invitations to the NCAA tournament. The conference had an 11–6 record in the Tournament, with Indiana, Michigan State, Ohio State, and Wisconsin reaching the Sweet Sixteen. Ohio State advanced to the Final Four. Three teams (Iowa, Minnesota, and Northwestern) received bids to the National Invitation Tournament. The conference had a 6–3 record with Minnesota losing in the championship game. Meyers Leonard was a lottery selection (11th overall) in the 2012 NBA draft, with Jared Sullinger also being selected in the first round and Draymond Green and Robbie Hummel being chosen in the second round.

== Preseason ==
Three teams were ranked in the preseason USA Today/ESPN poll: Ohio State (No. 3), Wisconsin (No. 14) and Michigan (No. 18), while Michigan State and Purdue were also receiving votes. The Big Ten Basketball Media Day for men's and women's basketball was October 27 in Chicago. The men's basketball media day was covered by ESPNU.

Jared Sullinger was named preseason conference player of the year at the conference media day. Other preseason All-Big Ten first team selections were Draymond Green, Trevor Mbakwe, Robbie Hummel, and Jordan Taylor. Ohio State was chosen as the top team, followed by Wisconsin and Michigan State. Sullinger and Taylor were also both preseason Associated Press All-Americans. 5 of the 30 nominees for the men's basketball Lowe's Senior CLASS Award were from the Big Ten: Michigan's Zack Novak, Michigan State's Green, Ohio State's William Buford, Purdue's Hummel and Wisconsin's Taylor.

=== Preseason watchlists ===
	Wooden	Naismith
Tim Hardaway Jr. UM	✓	✓
Draymond Green MSU	✓	✓
Trevor Mbakwe MIN	✓	
John Shurna NU	✓	✓
William Buford OSU	✓	✓
Aaron Craft OSU	✓	✓
Jared Sullinger OSU	✓	✓
Robbie Hummel PUR	✓	✓
Jordan Taylor WIS	✓	✓

=== Midseason award lists ===
Trey Burke, Aaron Craft, Tim Frazier, Lewis Jackson and Jordan Taylor are five of the nearly 60 Bob Cousy Award candidates named in December. On January 4, Burke, Craft, and Taylor were included on the list of 20 finalists. On February 2, the finalist list was shortened to 11, including Taylor and Craft. William Buford, Draymond Green, Jared Sullinger, and Cody Zeller were included on the 25-man Wooden Midseason list on January 17. Novak, Green, Buford and Hummel were among the 10 finalists for the Lowe's Senior CLASS Award on January 25. On February 6, Green, Sullinger and Zeller were included on the 20-player Oscar Robertson Trophy midseason watch list. On February 15, Zeller was named one of five finalists for the USBWA National Freshman of the Year won the previous year by Sullinger. On March 1, Zeller, Green, Sullinger and Taylor were named to the 30-player midseason Naismith Award watchlist. On March 6, Green and Sullinger were named to the 15-man Wooden Award finalist list. On March 19, Green became one of four finalists for the Naismith Award. Sullinger and Green were among the 10 finalists for the Wooden Award, a designation termed as Wooden All-American.

== Regular season ==
For the full season, the Big Ten led the nation in attendance for the 36th consecutive season and posted its 20th consecutive year with two million attendanees. Average attendance of 12,868 was well ahead of other high major conferences: SEC (11,513), Big 12 (11,057), Big East (10,881) and ACC (9,876). The conference has six of the top 25 schools in terms of average attendance: Wisconsin (5th, 17,181), Ohio State (8th, 16,511), Indiana (9th, 16,462), Illinois (14th, 14,986), Michigan State (15th, 14,797) and Purdue (21st, 13,324). No other conference had more than 4 of the top 25. Conference play officially began on Tuesday, December 27 when Illinois hosted Minnesota and Nebraska hosted its first conference game against 11th-ranked Wisconsin.

During the season Big Ten Conference led the nation in Rating percentage index among all conferences. The conference boasted 5 of the top 16 teams: Michigan State (number 3), Ohio State (number 6), Indiana (number 11), Michigan (number 15) and Wisconsin (number 16). All conference members were among the top 160 and the Big Ten was the only conference with exclusively top-180 members. The conference led the nation in both major elements of the index: combined winning percentage and strength of schedule index.

Michigan State's loss in the March 4 regular season finale at home to No. 10 Ohio State meant the Spartans shared the 2011–12 Big Ten regular season championship with Ohio State and Michigan, all of which finished the Big Ten season with a 13–5 conference record. Michigan needed a March 4 victory over Penn State to clinch its share of the Big Ten regular season championship. It was the 13th Big Ten Conference championships for Michigan and Michigan State, while it was the 20th for Ohio State.

=== Rankings ===
Legend
	Improvement in ranking
	Drop in ranking
	Not ranked previous week
RV	Received votes but were not ranked in Top 25 of poll

		Pre/ Wk 1	Wk 2	Wk 3	Wk 4	Wk 5	Wk 6	Wk 7	Wk 8	Wk 9	Wk 10	Wk 11	Wk 12	Wk 13	Wk 14	Wk 15	Wk 16	Wk 17	Wk 18	Wk 19	Final
Illinois	AP	RV	RV	RV	RV	24	19	25	RV		RV	22	RV	RV							
Illinois	C			RV	RV	т22	19	24	RV	RV	RV	25	RV								
Indiana	AP					RV	18	17	13	12	7	11	16	20	23	18	23	18	15	16	
Indiana	C			RV	RV	RV	20	18	15	12	8	13	17	20	23	20	24	20	15	17	13
Iowa	AP																				
Iowa	C																				
Michigan	AP	18	17	15	14	20	20	20	18	16	13	20	20	23	22	17	11	13	10	13	
Michigan	C	18	17	15	15	19	18	19	16	13	13	19	22	22	25	19	13	16	13	14	22
Michigan State	AP	RV	RV	RV	RV	RV	21	19	16	10	6	9	10	9	11	7	6	5	8	5	
Michigan State	C	RV	RV	RV	RV	RV	23	20	17	11	7	9	11	10	12	8	6	5	8	4	7
Minnesota	AP	RV	RV	RV																	
Minnesota	C																				
Nebraska	AP																				
Nebraska	C																				
Northwestern	AP				RV		RV	RV				RV									
Northwestern	C			RV	RV		RV	RV													
Ohio State	AP	3 (1)	3 (1)	3 (1)	2 (17)	2 (18)	2 (7)	2 (5)	2 (5)	6	5	6	4	3	3	6	8	10	7	7	
Ohio State	C	3	3	3	2 (8)	2 (11)	2 (2)	2 (1)	2 (1)	7	5	6	3	3	3	6	9	11	7	7	3
Penn State	AP																				
Penn State	C																				
Purdue	AP	RV	RV	RV	RV	RV				RV								RV			
Purdue	C	RV	RV	RV	RV	RV				RV											RV
Wisconsin	AP	15	14	11	9	14	14	13	11	18	RV	RV	25	19	21	15	16	14	14	14	
Wisconsin	C	14	13	11	7	16	15	14	11	19	RV	RV	25	20	22	17	15	15	12	13	12

=== Early-season tournaments ===
Big Ten teams emerged victorious in the following tournaments:

Name	Dates	No. teams	Champion
Charleston Classic	November 17, 2011 – November 20, 2011	8	Northwestern
Cancún Challenge	November 22, 2011 – November 23, 2011	8	Illinois
Chicago Invitational Challenge	November 13, 2011 – November 26, 2011	4*	Wisconsin

*Although these tournaments include more teams, only the number listed play for the championship.

==== ACC–Big Ten Challenge ====
Date	Time	ACC team	B1G team	Score	Location	Television	Attendance	Challenge leader
Nov 27	7:15 pm	Virginia Tech	Iowa	95–79	Cassell Coliseum • Blacksburg, Virginia	ESPNU	5,647	ACC (1–0)
Nov 27	7:15 pm	Florida State	No. 21 Minnesota	77–68	Donald L. Tucker Center • Tallahassee, Florida	ESPN2	7,941	Tied (1–1)
Nov 27	7:30 pm	No. 18 NC State	No. 3 Michigan	79–72	Crisler Center • Ann Arbor, Michigan	ESPN	12,693	B1G (2–1)
Nov 27	9:15 pm	Wake Forest	Nebraska	79–63	LJVM Coliseum • Winston-Salem, North Carolina	ESPNU	6,508	B1G (3–1)
Nov 27	9:15 pm	Maryland	Northwestern	77–57	Welsh-Ryan Arena • Evanston, Illinois	ESPN2	6,009	B1G (3–2)
Nov 27	9:30 pm	No. 14 North Carolina	No. 1 Indiana	83–59	Assembly Hall • Bloomington, Indiana	ESPN	17,472	B1G (4–2)
Nov 28	7:00 pm	Virginia	Wisconsin	60–54	Kohl Center • Madison, Wisconsin	ESPN2	16,690	B1G (4–3)
Nov 28	7:15 pm	Clemson	Purdue	73–61	Littlejohn Coliseum • Clemson, South Carolina	ESPNU	7,632	B1G (5–3)
Nov 28	7:30 pm	Miami	No. 13 Michigan State	67–59	BankUnited Center • Coral Gables, Florida	ESPN	5,791	B1G (5–4)
Nov 28	9:00 pm	Georgia Tech	No. 22 Illinois	75–62	Assembly Hall • Champaign, Illinois	ESPN2	12,224	B1G (6–4)
Nov 28	9:15 pm	Boston College	Penn State	73–61	Bryce Jordan Center • University Park, Pennsylvania	ESPNU	6,889	B1G (6–5)
Nov 28	9:30 pm	No. 2 Duke	No. 4 Ohio State	73–68	Cameron Indoor Stadium • Durham, North Carolina	ESPN	9,314	Tied (6–6)
WINNERS ARE IN BOLD. Game Times in EST. Rankings from AP Poll (Nov. 26).

=== Composite matrix ===
This table summarizes the head-to-head results between teams in conference play. (x) indicates games remaining this season.

	Illinois	Indiana	Iowa	Michigan	Michigan St	Minnesota	Nebraska	Northwestern	Ohio State	Penn State	Purdue	Wisconsin
vs. Illinois	–	1–0	0–1	2–0	0–1	1–1	1–1	1–1	1–1	1–0	2–0	2–0
vs. Indiana	0–1	–	1–1	1–1	1–1	1–1	1–0	0–1	1–1	0–2	0–2	1–0
vs. Iowa	1–0	1–1	–	0–1	1–0	0–2	1–1	2–0	1–0	1–1	2–0	0–2
vs. Michigan	0–2	1–1	1–0	–	1–1	0–1	0–1	0–2	1–1	0–2	1–1	0–1
vs. Michigan St	1–0	1–1	0–1	1–1	–	0–2	0–2	1–0	1–1	0–1	0–2	0–2
vs. Minnesota	1–1	1–1	2–0	1–0	2–0	–	0–2	1–1	1–0	0–1	1–0	2–0
vs. Nebraska	1–1	0–1	1–1	1–0	2–0	2–0	–	1–0	2–0	1–1	1–0	2–0
vs. Northwestern	1–1	1–0	0–2	2–0	0–1	1–1	0–1	–	2–0	0–2	2–0	1–0
vs. Ohio State	1–1	1–1	0–1	1–1	1–1	0–1	0–2	0–2	–	0–1	0–1	1–1
vs. Penn State	0–1	2–0	1–1	2–0	1–0	1–0	1–1	2–0	1–0	–	1–1	2–0
vs. Purdue	0–2	2–0	0–2	1–1	2–0	0–1	0–1	0–2	1–0	1–1	–	1–0
vs. Wisconsin	0–2	0–1	2–0	1–0	2–0	0–2	0–2	0–1	1–1	0–2	0–1	–
Total	6–12	11–7	8–10	13–5	13–5	6–12	4–14	8–10	13–5	4–14	10–8	12–6

=== Players of the week ===
Throughout the conference regular season, the Big Ten offices named a player of the week each Monday.

Week	Player of the week	Freshman of the week
11-14-11	Victor Oladipo, IND	Cody Zeller, IND
11-14-11	Victor Oladipo, IND	Aaron White, IOWA
11-21-11	Drew Crawford, NU	Cody Zeller (2), IND
11-28-11	Tim Hardaway Jr., MICH	Trey Burke, MICH
12-05-11	Meyers Leonard, ILL	Cody Zeller (3), IND
12-05-11	Keith Appling, MSU	Cody Zeller (3), IND
12-12-11	Christian Watford, IND	Trey Burke (2), MICH
12-12-11	Draymond Green, MSU	Trey Burke (2), MICH
12-19-11	Deshaun Thomas, OSU	Cody Zeller (4), IND
12-26-11	Meyers Leonard (2), ILL	Aaron White (2), IOWA
1-02-12	Trey Burke, MICH	Trey Burke (3), MICH
1-02-12	Keith Appling (2), MSU	Trey Burke (3), MICH
1-09-12	Jared Sullinger, OSU	Cody Zeller (5), IND
1-16-12	Brandon Paul, ILL	Joe Coleman, IND
1-23-12	Jordan Taylor,WIS	Trey Burke (4), MICH
1-30-12	Draymond Green (2), MSU	Branden Dawson, MSU
1-30-12	Brandon Richardson, NEB	Branden Dawson, MSU
2-6-12	John Shurna, NU	Aaron White (3), IOWA
2-6-12	Jared Sullinger (2), OSU	Dave Sobolewski, NU
2-13-12	Draymond Green (3),MSU	Cody Zeller (6), IND
2-20-12	Draymond Green (4),MSU	Trey Burke (5), MICH
2-27-12	Robbie Hummel, PUR	Trey Burke (6), MICH
2-27-12	Matt Gatens, IOWA	Trey Burke (6), MICH
3-5-12	Jared Sullinger (3),OSU	Cody Zeller (7), IND
3-5-12	Jared Sullinger (3),OSU	Trey Burke (7), MICH

On January 17, Brandon Paul was named national player of the week by the United States Basketball Writers Association.

On February 21, Draymond Green was named national player of the week by the USBWA.

== Honors and awards ==
Four players (Novak, Craft, Drew Crawford and Jared Berggren) were named Academic All-District, meaning that they were among the 40 finalists to be named to the 15-man Academic All-America Team. Craft was named to the first team, Crawford to the second team and Novak to the third team, giving the Big Ten three Academic All-Americans, which was more than any other conference.

=== Conference honors ===
Two sets of conference award winners were recognized by the Big Ten - one selected by league coaches and one selected by the media.

Honor	Coaches	Media
Player of the Year	Draymond Green, Michigan State	Draymond Green, Michigan State
Coach of the Year	Tom Izzo, Michigan State	Tom Izzo, Michigan State
Freshman of the Year	Cody Zeller, Indiana	Trey Burke, Michigan
Defensive Player of the Year	Aaron Craft, Ohio State	Not Selected
Sixth Man of the Year	D. J. Byrd, Purdue	Not Selected
All Big Ten First Team	Draymond Green, Michigan State	Draymond Green, Michigan State
All Big Ten First Team	John Shurna, Northwestern	John Shurna, Northwestern
All Big Ten First Team	Jared Sullinger, Ohio State	Jared Sullinger, Ohio State
All Big Ten First Team	Robbie Hummel, Purdue	Robbie Hummel, Purdue
All Big Ten First Team	Jordan Taylor, Wisconsin	Tim Frazier, Penn State
All Big Ten Second Team	Tim Frazier, Penn State	Jordan Taylor, Wisconsin
All Big Ten Second Team	Cody Zeller, Indiana	Cody Zeller, Indiana
All Big Ten Second Team	Trey Burke, Michigan	Trey Burke, Michigan
All Big Ten Second Team	William Buford, Ohio State	William Buford, Ohio State
All Big Ten Second Team	Deshaun Thomas, Ohio State	Matt Gatens, Iowa
All Big Ten Third Team	Matt Gatens, Iowa	Deshaun Thomas, Ohio State
All Big Ten Third Team	Tim Hardaway Jr., Michigan	Tim Hardaway Jr., Michigan
All Big Ten Third Team	Keith Appling, Michigan State	Keith Appling, Michigan State
All Big Ten Third Team	Drew Crawford, Northwestern	Drew Crawford, Northwestern
All Big Ten Third Team	Brandon Paul, Illinois	Aaron Craft, Ohio State
All Big Ten Honorable Mention	Aaron Craft, Ohio State	Brandon Paul, Illinois
All Big Ten Honorable Mention	Meyers Leonard, Illinois	Meyers Leonard, Illinois
All Big Ten Honorable Mention	Christian Watford, Indiana	Christian Watford, Indiana
All Big Ten Honorable Mention	Lewis Jackson, Purdue	Lewis Jackson, Purdue
All Big Ten Honorable Mention	Jared Berggren, Wisconsin	Jared Berggren, Wisconsin
All Big Ten Honorable Mention	Ryan Evans, Wisconsin	Ryan Evans, Wisconsin
All Big Ten Honorable Mention		Jordan Hulls, Indiana
All Big Ten Honorable Mention		Victor Oladipo, Indiana
All Big Ten Honorable Mention		Aaron White, Iowa
All Big Ten Honorable Mention		Zack Novak, Michigan
All Big Ten Honorable Mention		Branden Dawson, Michigan State
All Big Ten Honorable Mention		D. J. Byrd, Purdue
All-Freshman Team	Cody Zeller, Indiana	Not Selected
All-Freshman Team	Trey Burke, Michigan	Not Selected
All-Freshman Team	Aaron White, Iowa	Not Selected
All-Freshman Team	Branden Dawson, Michigan State	Not Selected
All-Freshman Team	Dave Sobolewski, Northwestern	Not Selected
All Defensive Team	Victor Oladipo, Indiana	Not Selected
All Defensive Team	Draymond Green, Michigan State	Not Selected
All Defensive Team	Aaron Craft, Ohio State	Not Selected
All Defensive Team	Tim Frazier, Penn State	Not Selected
All Defensive Team	Josh Gasser, Wisconsin	Not Selected

The leading scorer for the year was John Shurna with an average of 20.0 and the leading rebounder was Draymond Green with an average of 10.6.

=== NABC ===
The National Association of Basketball Coaches announced their Division I All-District teams on March 14, recognizing the nation's best men's collegiate basketball student-athletes. Selected and voted on by member coaches of the NABC, 240 student-athletes, from 24 districts were chosen. The selection on this list were then eligible for the State Farm Coaches' Division I All-America teams. The following list represented the Big Ten players chosen to the list. Since the Big Ten Conference was its own district, this is equivalent to being named All-Big Ten by the NABC.

First Team

- Draymond Green Michigan State
- Jared Sullinger Ohio State
- Jordan Taylor Wisconsin
- William Buford Ohio State
- John Shurna Northwestern
Second Team
- Cody Zeller Indiana
- Robbie Hummel Purdue
- Tim Frazier Penn State
- Trey Burke Michigan
- Brandon Paul Illinois

=== USBWA ===
On March 6, the U.S. Basketball Writers Association released its 2011–12 Men's All-District Teams, based upon voting from its national membership. There were nine regions from coast to coast, and a player and coach of the year were selected in each. The following lists all the Big Ten representatives selected within their respective regions.

District II (NY, NJ, DE, DC, PA, WV)

None Selected

District V (OH, IN, IL, MI, MN, WI)

Player of the Year

- Draymond Green, Michigan State

Coach of the Year

- Tom Izzo, Michigan State

All-District Team

- William Buford, Ohio State
- Trey Burke, Michigan
- Draymond Green, Michigan State
- Robbie Hummel, Purdue
- John Shurna, Northwestern
- Jared Sullinger, Ohio State
- Jordan Taylor, Wisconsin
- Cody Zeller, Indiana
District VI (IA, MO, KS, OK, NE, ND, SD)

None Selected

=== National postseason honors ===
Sullinger and Green were first team 2012 NCAA Men's Basketball All-Americans by The Sporting News, while Zeller was a member of their All-Freshman team. Green and Sullinger were also first team All-American selections by the United States Basketball Writers Association. On March 20, the NABC chose Green and Sullinger as a first team All-Americans. Sullinger and Green were named first team Associated Press All-Americans, making them unanimous first team selections. Trey Burke, Robbie Hummel, Jordan Taylor, John Shurna, and Cody Zeller were honorable mention selections. Hummel was named the Lowe's Senior CLASS Award winner. Aaron Craft won the Elite 89 Award. Green was named the NABC Player of the Year, while Izzo won his second career NABC Coach of the Year. 41 men's basketball players in their second year or beyond earned Academic All-Big Ten recognition for carrying a cumulative grade-point average of 3.0 or higher.

CBSSports.com used a modified selection process that resulted in Green being named a first team All-American, while Sullinger and Burke were second team selections. The process derided the traditional basketball All-American process of naming the best players and was modelled on the All-Pro or NHL All-Star team formula of choosing the best players by position. Shurna was also selected to participate in the NABC 2012 Reese's Division I All-Star Game at the 2012 NCAA Division I men's basketball tournament final four.

== Postseason ==
=== Big Ten tournament ===
Michigan State emerged as the Big Ten Conference tournament champion by defeating Ohio State in the championship game. The team was led by most outstanding player Green. Spartan Brandon Wood, Minnesota's Andre Hollins and Ohio State's Sullinger and Deshaun Thomas were also on the all-tournament team.

First round Thursday, March 8 ESPN2/BTN
8	Iowa	64
9	Illinois	61
5	Indiana	75
12	Penn State	58
7	Northwestern	68
10	Minnesota	75^{OT}
6	Purdue	79
11	Nebraska	61

Quarterfinals; Friday, March 9 ESPN/BTN
1	Michigan State	92
8	Iowa	75
4	Wisconsin	79
5	Indiana	71
2	Michigan	73^{OT}
10	Minnesota	69
3	Ohio State	88
6	Purdue	71

Semifinals; Saturday, March 10; CBS
1	Michigan State	65
4	Wisconsin	52
2	Michigan	55
3	Ohio State	77

Championship; Sunday, March 11; CBS
1	Michigan State	68
3	Ohio State	64

=== NCAA tournament ===
The Big Ten had six teams in the 2012 NCAA Division I men's basketball tournament: Michigan State earned the automatic bid and a number 1 seed, while Indiana (2 seed), Michigan (4 seed), Ohio State (4 seed), Purdue (4 seed), Wisconsin (10 seed). With 5 top-4-seeded teams, the Big Ten tied the tournament record since seeding began in 1979. The Big Ten matched its conference best and for 2012 national lead with four Sweet Sixteen participants (Indiana, Michigan State, Ohio State Wisconsin) and was the only conference with multiple entrants to have half its teams make the Elite Eight round. Ohio State achieved its conference leading 10th final four.

# of Bids	Record	Win %	R32	S16	E8	F4	CG
6	11–6	.647	5	4	1	1	0

Team	Bid Type	Seed	Results
Michigan State	Automatic	#1	defeated #16 Long Island 89–67 defeated #9 Saint Louis 65–61 lost to No. 4 Louisville 57–44
Ohio State	At-large	#2	defeated #15 Loyola 78–59 defeated #7 Gonzaga 73–66 defeated #6 Cincinnati 81–66 defeated #1 Syracuse 77–70 lost to No. 2 Kansas 64–62
Michigan	At-large	#4	lost to No. 13 Ohio 65–60
Wisconsin	At-large	#4	defeated #13 Montana 73–49 defeated #5 Vanderbilt 60–57 lost to No. 1 Syracuse 64–63
Indiana	At-large	#4	defeated #13 New Mexico State 79–66 defeated #12 VCU 63–61 lost to No. 1 Kentucky 102–90
Purdue	At-large	#10	defeated #7 Saint Mary's 72–69 lost to No. 2 Kansas 63–60

=== National Invitation Tournament ===
All three Big Ten entrants in the 2012 National Invitation Tournament won their opening games and Minnesota reached the championship game before losing.

# of Bids	Record	Win %	R2	R3	SF	CG
3	6–3	.667	3	1	1	1

Team	Bid Type	Seed	Results
Northwestern	At-large	#4	defeated #5 Akron 76–74 lost to No. 1 Washington 76–55
Minnesota	At-large	#6	defeated #3 La Salle 70–61 defeated #2 Miami 78–60 defeated #4 Middle Tennessee 78–72 defeated #1 Washington 68–67 OT lost to No. 3 Stanford 75–51
Iowa	At-large	#7	defeated #2 Dayton 84–75 lost to No. 3 Oregon 108–97

=== Other tournaments ===
The Big Ten did not have any entrants in the other post season tournaments.

=== 2012 NBA draft ===
The following current 1st, 2nd & 3rd team All-Big Ten performers were listed as seniors: Draymond Green, Robbie Hummel, John Shurna, Jordan Taylor, Matt Gatens, William Buford. Former All-Big Ten performer and fifth-year Trevor Mbakwe has been granted a sixth year of eligibility by the NCAA, and he has opted to use it. The deadline for entering the NBA draft is April 29, but once one has declared, the deadline for withdrawing the declaration and retaining NCAA eligibility is April 10. The deadline for submitting information to the NBA Advisory Committee for a 72-hour response is April 3.

The following Big Ten underclassmen have sought the advice of the NBA's undergraduate advisory committee to determine his draft prospects: Trey Burke
The following Big Ten underclassmen declared early for the 2011 draft: Jared Sullinger, Meyers Leonard
The following Big Ten underclassmen entered their name in the draft but who did not hire agents and opted to return to college:

The following Big Ten players were drafted in the 2012 NBA draft.

Round	Pick	Player	Position	Nationality	Team	School/club team
1	11	Meyers Leonard	C	United States	Portland Trail Blazers	Illinois (So.)
1	21	Jared Sullinger	PF	United States	Boston Celtics	Ohio St. (So.)
2	35	Draymond Green	PF	United States	Golden State Warriors (from Brooklyn) (Note: On February 23, 2011, the Golden State Warriors acquired Troy Murphy and a 2012 second-round draft pick (the 35th pick) from the New Jersey Nets (now Brooklyn Nets) in exchange for Brandan Wright and Dan Gadzuric.)	Michigan St. (Sr.)
2	58	Robbie Hummel	PF	United States	Minnesota Timberwolves (from Oklahoma City) (Note: On December 13, 2011, the Minnesota Timberwolves acquired Robert Vaden, a 2012 second-round draft pick (the 58th pick) and a future conditional second-round draft pick from the Oklahoma City Thunder in exchange for Lazar Hayward.)	Purdue (Sr.)

==== Pre-draft trades ====
Prior to the day of the draft, the following trades were made and resulted in exchanges of draft picks between the teams.
