= Derrick Nix =

Derrick Nix may refer to:

- Derrick Nix (basketball)
- Derrick Nix (American football)
