= 2012–13 Michigan State Spartans men's basketball team =

American college basketball season

2012–13 Michigan State Spartans men's basketball

NCAA tournament, Sweet Sixteen
- Conference: Big Ten Conference

Ranking
- Coaches: No. 13
- AP: No. 9
- Record: 27–9 (13–5 Big Ten)
- Head coach: Tom Izzo (18th season)
- Associate head coach: Dwayne Stephens (10th season)
- Assistant coaches: Mike Garland (6th season); Dane Fife (2nd season)
- Captains: Keith Appling; Russell Byrd; Derrick Nix
- Home arena: Breslin Center

2012–13 Big Ten Conference men's basketball standings
	Conf.				Overall
Team	W		L	PCT	W		L	PCT
No. 4 Indiana	14	–	4	.778	29	–	7	.806
No. 7 Ohio State †	13	–	5	.722	29	–	8	.784
No. 9 Michigan State	13	–	5	.722	27	–	9	.750
No. 10 Michigan	12	–	6	.667	31	–	8	.795
No. 18 Wisconsin	12	–	6	.667	23	–	12	.657
Iowa	9	–	9	.500	25	–	13	.658
Illinois	8	–	10	.444	23	–	13	.639
Minnesota	8	–	10	.444	21	–	13	.618
Purdue	8	–	10	.444	16	–	18	.471
Nebraska	5	–	13	.278	15	–	18	.455
Northwestern	4	–	14	.222	13	–	19	.406
Penn State	2	–	16	.111	10	–	21	.323
† 2013 Big Ten tournament winner Rankings from AP Poll

The 2012–13 Michigan State Spartans represented Michigan State University in the 2012–13 NCAA Division I men's basketball season. The head coach was Tom Izzo who was in his 18th year. The team played their home games at Breslin Center in East Lansing, MI and were members of the Big Ten Conference. MSU finished with a record of 27–9, 13–5 to finish in a tie for second place in Big Ten play. The Spartans lost in the semifinals of the Big Ten tournament to Ohio State. MSU received a bid to the NCAA tournament for the 16th straight year where they reached the Sweet Sixteen for the second consecutive year, losing to Duke.

== Previous season ==
The Spartans finished the 2011–12 season with a record of 29–8, 13–5 to earn a share of the Big Ten Championship. They won the Big Ten tournament to earn a No. 1 seed in the NCAA tournament, their 15th straight trip to the Tournament, and advanced to the Sweet Sixteen before losing to Louisville.

== Offeseason ==
The Spartans lost Draymond Green (16.2 PPG, 10.6 RPG, 3.8 APG) to the NBA draft following the season.

=== 2012 recruiting class ===
Michigan State's top-10 ranked recruiting class, was headlined by 6'4" SG Gary Harris. The rest of the class consisted of PF Matt Costello, PF Kenny Kaminski, and PG Denzel Valentine. Notably, Matt Costello and Denzel Valentine finished first and second, respectively, in the voting for Michigan's Mr. Basketball, MSU's fourth straight Mr. Basketball signee (2011 winner Dwaun Anderson originally signed with Michigan State, but was released from his National Letter of Intent to go to Wagner College for personal reasons).

College recruiting
Name	Hometown	School	Height	Weight	Commit date
Gary Harris #2 SG	Indianapolis, Indiana	Hamilton Southeastern High School (IN)	6 ft 4 in (1.93 m)	195 lb (88 kg)	Nov 26, 2011
Gary Harris #2 SG	Recruit ratings: Scout: Rivals: (97)				
Kenny Kaminski #16 PF	Medina, Ohio	Medina Sr. High School	6 ft 7 in (2.01 m)	230 lb (100 kg)	Jul 31, 2010
Kenny Kaminski #16 PF	Recruit ratings: Scout: Rivals: (92)				
Matt Costello #17 PF	Linwood, Michigan	Bay City Western High School	6 ft 9 in (2.06 m)	225 lb (102 kg)	Aug 11, 2010
Matt Costello #17 PF	Recruit ratings: Scout: Rivals: (92)				
Denzel Valentine #26 SF	Lansing, MI	J. W. Sexton High School	6 ft 5 in (1.96 m)	205 lb (93 kg)	
Denzel Valentine #26 SF	Recruit ratings: Scout: Rivals: (92)				
Overall recruit ranking:
Note: In many cases, Scout, Rivals, 247Sports, On3, and ESPN may conflict in their listings of height and weight.; In these cases, the average was taken. ESPN grades are on a 100-point scale.; Sources: "Michigan State Commit List for 2012". Rivals.; "Men's Basketball Recruiting". Scout.; "ESPN - Michigan State Spartans Basketball Recruiting 2012". ESPN.; "Scout.com Team Recruiting Rankings". Scout.; "2012 Team Ranking". Rivals.

== Season summary ==
Juniors Adreian Payne (10.5 points and 7.6 rebounds per game) and Keith Appling (13.4 points per game), senior Derrick Nix (9.9 points and 6.6 rebounds per game), and sophomore Branden Dawson (8.9 points and 5.9 rebounds per game) led the Spartans. Freshman Gary Harris (12.9 points per game) also played a major role for the Spartans. The Spartans began the season ranked No. 14 in both polls and traveled to Germany to play Connecticut at Ramstein Air Force Base. The Spartans were stunned by UConn, but rebounded with a win over No. 7 Kansas in the Champions Classic. Shortly thereafter, MSU fell to Miami in the ACC-Big Ten Challenge. The Spartans defeated Tuskegee at Jenison Field House, their former basketball home on Michigan State's campus in a series of games held to commemorate the "Game of Change" that occurred during the 1963 NCAA tournament. The Spartans cruised through the remaining non-conference season to finish at 11–2 and ranked No. 18 in the country.

Michigan State lost their first Big Ten game to No. 9-ranked Minnesota, but won their next six conference games. The streak included a win over No. 11 Ohio State. Following a loss to No. 7 Indiana, MSU again went on a winning streak, winning their next five games including wins against No. 18 Minnesota and No. 4 Michigan. The streak ended with losses to No. 1 Indiana, at No. 18 Ohio State, and at No. 4 Michigan in a three-game stretch leaving MSU at 11–5 in conference. MSU rebounded to win the final two games against No. 22 Wisconsin and Northwestern. The Spartans finished in a second place tie with Ohio State with a 13–5 conference record and ranked No. 8 in the country.

As the No. 3 seed in the Big Ten tournament, MSU faced Iowa in the quarterfinals. After a brutal first half where the Spartans only mustered 20 points and trailed Iowa 30–20 at the break, MSU responded. Led by Keith Appling and Gary Harris' 13 points each, MSU rallied from a 12-point deficit in the second half to pull out the 59–56 victory. The win moved MSU to the semifinals of the tournament against Ohio State. In a hard fought battle, MSU was unable to pull out the victory, falling to OSU 61–58.

The Spartans received a No. 3 seed in the NCAA tournament, their 16th straight appearance in the Tournament. Led by Derrick Nix's 23 points and 15 rebounds in the game, as the Spartans cruised to a 65–54 win over Valparaiso in the first round. In the second round, Gary Harris led the Spartans with 23 points as MSU blew out Memphis to advance to their fifth Sweet Sixteen in six years. The trip to the Sweet Sixteen also marked the Spartans 11th trip in the prior 16 years. However, the Spartans were defeated by No. 2 seed Duke, who was led by Seth Curry with 29 points, in the Sweet Sixteen. Appling's 16 points and Payne's 14 were not enough in the loss.

== Roster ==
2012–13 Michigan State Spartans men's basketball team
Players
Coaches

Pos.	#	Name	Height	Weight	Year	Previous school	Hometown
G	11	Keith Appling (C)	6 ft 2 in (1.88 m)	190 lb (86 kg)	Jr	Pershing H.S.	Detroit, MI
F	0	Russell Byrd (C)	6 ft 7 in (2.01 m)	205 lb (93 kg)	RS So	Blackhawk Christian	Fort Wayne, IN
G	40	Dan Chapman (W)	6 ft 3 in (1.91 m)	190 lb (86 kg)	So	Okemos H.S.	Okemos, MI
F	10	Matt Costello	6 ft 9 in (2.06 m)	245 lb (111 kg)	Fr	Jefferson H.S.	Bay City, MI
G	22	Branden Dawson	6 ft 6 in (1.98 m)	230 lb (104 kg)	So	Lew Wallace H.S.	Gary, IN
F	2	Alex Gauna	6 ft 9 in (2.06 m)	245 lb (111 kg)	RS So	Eaton Rapids H.S.	Eaton Rapids, MI
G	14	Gary Harris	6 ft 4 in (1.93 m)	205 lb (93 kg)	Fr	Hamilton Southeastern H.S.	Fishers, IN
F	30	Kenny Kaminski	6 ft 8 in (2.03 m)	240 lb (109 kg)	Fr	Medina H.S.	Medina, OH
G	3	Brandan Kearney	6 ft 5 in (1.96 m)	190 lb (86 kg)	So	Southeastern H.S.	Detroit, MI
C	25	Derrick Nix (C)	6 ft 9 in (2.06 m)	270 lb (122 kg)	Sr	Pershing H.S.	Detroit, MI
C	5	Adreian Payne	6 ft 10 in (2.08 m)	240 lb (109 kg)	Jr	Western H.S.	Dayton, OH
G	20	Travis Trice	6 ft 0 in (1.83 m)	170 lb (77 kg)	So	Wayne H.S.	Huber Heights, OH
G	15	Keenan Wetzel (W)	6 ft 4 in (1.93 m)	200 lb (91 kg)	RS So	St. Mary Catholic Central H.S.	Monroe, MI
G	41	Colby Wollenman	6 ft 7 in (2.01 m)	225 lb (102 kg)	So	Big Horn H.S.	Big Horn, WY
G	45	Denzel Valentine	6 ft 5 in (1.96 m)	220 lb (100 kg)	Fr	Sexton H.S.	Lansing, MI

Head coach

- Tom Izzo (Northern Michigan)

Assistant coach(es)

- Dwayne Stephens (Michigan State)
- Dane Fife (Indiana)
- Mike Garland (Northern Michigan)

Legend

- (C) Team captain
- (S) Suspended
- (I) Ineligible
- (W) Walk-on
- Injured
- Current redshirt

Roster
Last update: 2011-10-11

=== Depth chart ===
Pos.	Starting 5	Bench
C	Derrick Nix	Matt Costello
PF	Adreian Payne	Alex Gauna
SF	Branden Dawson	Russell Byrd
SG	Gary Harris	Denzel Valentine
PG	Keith Appling	Travis Trice

== Schedule and results ==
Date time, TV	Rank^{#}	Opponent^{#}	Result	Record	High points	High rebounds	High assists	Site (attendance) city, state
Exhibition
Oct 30, 2012*; 7:00 pm	No. 14	Northwood	W 85–57		16 – Dawson	8 – Nix/Payne	7 – Appling	Breslin Center; East Lansing, MI
Nov 2, 2012*; 8:30 pm	No. 14	Saint Cloud State	W 62–49		14 – Nix	11 – Payne	4 – Appling	Breslin Center; East Lansing, MI
Non-conference regular season
Nov 9, 2012*; 5:30 pm, ESPN	No. 14	vs. Connecticut; Armed Forces Classic	L 62–66	0–1	17 – Appling	11 – Nix	4 – Appling	Ramstein Air Base (3,086); Kaiserslautern, Germany
Nov 13, 2012*; 7:00 pm, ESPN	No. 21	vs. No. 7 Kansas; Champions Classic	W 67–64	1–1	19 – Appling	7 – Nix/Payne	4 – Valentine	Georgia Dome (22,847); Atlanta, GA
Nov 18, 2012*; 12:00 pm	No. 21	Texas Southern	W 69–41	2–1	19 – Harris	11 – Nix	5 – Valentine	Breslin Center (14,797); East Lansing, MI
Nov 20, 2012*; 8:00 pm, BTN	No. 15	Boise State	W 74–70	3–1	22 – Appling	5 – Appling/Dawson	7 – Appling	Breslin Center (14,797); East Lansing, MI
Nov 23, 2012*; 8:15 pm, BTN	No. 15	Oakland	W 70–52	4–1	20 – Appling	10 – Valentine	6 – Valentine	Breslin Center (14,797); East Lansing, MI
Nov 25, 2012*; 12:00 pm, ESPN3	No. 15	Louisiana–Lafayette	W 63–60	5–1	19 – Appling	10 – Payne	5 – Appling	Breslin Center (14,797); East Lansing, MI
Nov 28, 2012*; 7:30 pm, ESPN	No. 13	at Miami (FL); ACC–Big Ten Challenge	L 59–67	5–2	15 – Appling	8 – Harris	4 – Appling	BankUnited Center (5,791); Coral Gables, FL
Dec 1, 2012*; 12:00 pm, BTN	No. 13	Nicholls State	W 84–39	6–2	13 – Appling	12 – Payne	6 – Appling	Breslin Center (14,797); East Lansing, MI
Dec 5, 2012*; 8:00 pm, BTN	No. 19	Arkansas–Pine Bluff	W 76–44	7–2	13 – Harris	7 – Dawson	5 – Trice	Breslin Center (14,797); East Lansing, MI
Dec 8, 2012*; 2:00 pm, BTN	No. 19	Loyola (IL)	W 73–61	8–2	20 – Harris	10 – Payne	7 – Appling	Breslin Center (14,797); East Lansing, MI
Dec 15, 2012*; 9:00 pm, ESPNU	No. 19	Tuskegee	W 92–56	9–2	25 – Appling	13 – Nix	4 – Trice	Jenison Fieldhouse (6,589); East Lansing, MI
Dec 18, 2012*; 7:00 pm, ESPNU	No. 20	at Bowling Green	W 64–53	10–2	13 – Harris	8 – Nix	2 – 4 tied	Stroh Center (4,291); Bowling Green, OH
Dec 22, 2012*; 2:00 pm, ESPN2	No. 20	Texas	W 67–56	11–2	25 – Nix	11 – Nix	3 – Appling/Valentine	Breslin Center (14,797); East Lansing, MI
Big Ten regular season
Dec 31, 2012; 2:00 pm, ESPN2	No. 18	at No. 9 Minnesota	L 63–76	11–3 (0–1)	15 – Appling	7 – Payne	5 – Appling	Williams Arena (14,625); Minneapolis, MN
Jan 05, 2013; 12:00 pm, BTN	No. 18	Purdue	W 84–61	12–3 (1–1)	22 – Harris	11 – Dawson	8 – Appling	Breslin Center (14,797); East Lansing, MI
Jan 10, 2013; 7:00 pm, ESPN2	No. 22	at Iowa	W 62–59	13–3 (2–1)	17 – Dawson	7 – Nix	4 – Appling/Valentine	Carver-Hawkeye Arena (12,872); Iowa City, IA
Jan 13, 2013; 6:00 pm, BTN	No. 22	Nebraska	W 66–56	14–3 (3–1)	17 – Nix	8 – Valentine	9 – Appling	Breslin Center (14,797); East Lansing, MI
Jan 16, 2013; 7:00 pm, BTN	No. 18	at Penn State	W 81–72	15–3 (4–1)	20 – Payne	7 – Payne	4 – Nix	Bryce Jordan Center (6,585); University Park, PA
Jan 19, 2013; 6:00 pm, ESPN	No. 18	No. 11 Ohio State	W 59–56	16–3 (5–1)	15 – Appling	10 – Dawson	3 – Appling	Breslin Center (14,797); East Lansing, MI
Jan 22, 2013; 7:00 pm, ESPN	No. 13	at Wisconsin	W 49–47	17–3 (6–1)	19 – Appling	13 – Dawson	3 – Payne	Kohl Center (17,249); Madison, WI
Jan 27, 2013; 1:00 pm, CBS	No. 13	at No. 7 Indiana	L 70–75	17–4 (6–2)	21 – Harris	9 – Payne	6 – Nix	Assembly Hall (17,472); Bloomington, IN
Jan 31, 2013; 7:00 pm, ESPN	No. 13	Illinois	W 80–75	18–4 (7–2)	24 – Appling	9 – Dawson	7 – Appling	Breslin Center (14,797); East Lansing, MI
Feb 6, 2013; 7:00 pm, BTN	No. 12	No. 18 Minnesota	W 61–50	19–4 (8–2)	15 – Harris	7 – Payne	4 – Harris	Breslin Center (14,797); East Lansing, MI
Feb 9, 2013; 7:00 pm, BTN	No. 12	at Purdue	W 78–65	20–4 (9–2)	20 – Dawson	6 – Payne/Valentine	4 – Valentine	Mackey Arena (14,845); West Lafayette, IN
Feb 12, 2013; 9:00 pm, ESPN	No. 8	No. 4 Michigan; Rivalry	W 75–52	21–4 (10–2)	17 – Harris	8 – Valentine	4 – Valentine	Breslin Center (14,797); East Lansing, MI
Feb 16, 2013; 8:00 pm, BTN	No. 8	at Nebraska	W 73–64	22–4 (11–2)	16 – Appling	14 – Payne	4 – Appling	Bob Devaney Sports Center (12,202); Lincoln, NE
Feb 19, 2013; 7:00 pm, ESPN	No. 4	No. 1 Indiana	L 68–72	22–5 (11–3)	19 – Harris	7 – Payne/Valentine	3 – Nix/Valentine	Breslin Center (14,797); East Lansing, MI
Feb 24, 2013; 4:00 pm, CBS	No. 4	at No. 18 Ohio State	L 60–68	22–6 (11–4)	14 – Harris	15 – Payne	5 – Harris	Value City Arena (18,809); Columbus, OH
Mar 3, 2013; 4:00 pm, CBS	No. 9	at No. 4 Michigan; Rivalry	L 57–58	22–7 (11–5)	17 – Payne	12 – Payne	5 – Appling	Crisler Center (12,693); Ann Arbor, MI
Mar 7, 2013; 9:00 pm, ESPN	No. 10	No. 22 Wisconsin	W 58–43	23–7 (12–5)	19 – Appling	11 – Payne	4 – Trice	Breslin Center (14,797); East Lansing, MI
Mar 10, 2013; 6:00 pm, BTN	No. 10	Northwestern	W 71–61	24–7 (13–5)	16 – Appling	6 – Dawson	6 – Nix	Breslin Center (14,797); East Lansing, MI
Big Ten tournament
Mar 15, 2013; 9:00 pm, BTN	(3) No. 8	vs. (6) Iowa; Quarterfinals	W 59–56	25–7	18 – Payne	10 – Payne	3 – Nix/Trice	United Center (21,229); Chicago, IL
Mar 16, 2013; 4:18 pm, CBS	(3) No. 8	vs. (2) No. 10 Ohio State; Semifinals	L 58–61	25–8	17 – Nix	9 – Nix	3 – Payne/Trice	United Center (21,824); Chicago, IL
NCAA tournament
Mar 21,2013*; 12:15 pm, CBS	(3 MW) No. 9	vs. (14 MW) Valparaiso; Second Round	W 65–54	26–8	23 – Nix	15 – Nix	4 – Harris	The Palace of Auburn Hills (18,863); Auburn Hills, MI
Mar 23, 2013*; 2:45 pm, CBS	(3 MW) No. 9	vs. (6 MW) No. 19 Memphis; Third Round	W 70–48	27–8	23 – Harris	10 – Payne	6 – Valentine	The Palace of Auburn Hills (21,723); Auburn Hills, MI
Mar 29, 2013*; 9:58 pm, CBS	(3 MW) No. 9	vs. (2 MW) No. 6 Duke; Sweet Sixteen	L 61–71	27–9	16 – Appling	10 – Payne	2 – Dawson/Harris	Lucas Oil Stadium (35,520); Indianapolis, IN
*Non-conference game. ^{#}Rankings from AP Poll. (#) Tournament seedings in parentheses. All times are in Eastern Time; Source.

== Player statistics ==
Individual player statistics (Final)
		Minutes		Scoring		Total FGs			3-point FGs			Free-Throws			Rebounds							
Player	GP	Tot	Avg	Pts	Avg	FG	FGA	Pct	3FG	3FA	Pct	FT	FTA	Pct	Off	Def	Tot	Avg	A	Stl	Blk	Tov
Appling, Keith	36	1208	33.6	481	13.4	156	376	.415	41	128	.320	128	171	.749	14	109	123	3.4	120	46	20	84
Bohnoff, Trevor	4	3	0.8	1	0.3	0	0		0	0		1	2	.500	1	0	1	0.3	0	1	0	0
Byrd, Russell	27	202	7.5	43	1.6	14	51	.275	7	41	.171	8	16	.500	9	10	19	0.7	11	2	1	13
Chapman, Dan	11	10	0.9	0	0.0	0	2	.000	0	1	.000	0	0		0	2	2	0.2	0	0	0	0
Costello, Matt	30	184	6.1	44	1.5	15	32	.469	0	0		14	17	.824	10	30	40	1.3	5	6	13	7
Dacey, Emmett	2	2	1.0	0	0.0	0	1	.000	0	1	.000	0	0		0	0	0	0.0	0	0	0	0
Dawson, Branden	36	969	26.9	321	8.9	139	262	.531	0	5	.000	43	80	.538	77	135	212	5.9	47	57	33	73
Gauna, Alex	35	214	6.1	43	1.2	20	37	.541	0	0		3	6	.500	10	25	35	1.0	4	6	1	13
Harris, Gary	34	1010	29.7	439	12.9	150	329	.456	65	158	.411	74	98	.755	30	56	86	2.5	46	45	6	51
Kearney, Brandan	13	220	16.9	30	2.3	11	37	.297	3	16	.188	5	9	.556	12	8	20	1.5	20	7	1	14
Nix, Derrick	36	994	27.6	358	9.9	130	257	.506	0	0		98	142	.690	19	157	237	6.6	56	39	5	53
Payne, Adreian	36	922	25.6	379	10.5	137	251	.546	16	42	.381	89	105	.848	75	198	273	7.6	27	27	46	64
Sibedwo, Bella	2	2	1.0	0	0.0	0	1	.000	0	0		0	0		0	0	0	0.0	1	0	0	0
Trice, Travis	27	503	18.6	129	4.8	41	128	.320	29	72	.403	18	25	.720	8	34	42	1.6	50	25	1	34
Valentine, Denzel	36	749	20.8	180	5.0	69	155	.445	16	57	.281	26	39	.667	39	110	149	4.1	87	28	12	71
Wetzel, Keenan	10	7	0.7	0	0.0	0	2	.000	0	2	.000	0	0		0	2	2	0.2	0	0	1	1

Legend
GP	Games played	Avg	Average per game
FG	Field-goals made	FGA	Field-goal attempts	Off	Offensive rebounds
Def	Defensive rebounds	A	Assists	TO	Turnovers
Blk	Blocks	Stl	Steals

== Rankings ==
Ranking movements Legend: ██ Increase in ranking ██ Decrease in ranking
	Week																				
Poll	Pre	1	2	3	4	5	6	7	8	9	10	11	12	13	14	15	16	17	18	19	Final
AP	14	21	15	13	19	19	20	19	18	22	18	13	13	12	8	4	9	10	8	9	Not released
Coaches	14	22	19	14	17	19	19	19	18	18	17	11	9	8	8	5	10	12	7	9	13

*AP does not release post-NCAA tournament rankings

== Awards and honors ==
- Gary Harris - Big Ten Freshman of the Year
- Gary Harris - All Big Ten Second Team
- Adreian Payne - All Big Ten Second Team
- Keith Appling - All Big Ten Second Team (Coaches); All Big Ten Third Team (Media)
- Derrick Nix - All Big Ten Honorable Mention (Coaches)
- Keith Appling - NABC All-District Second Team
