= D. J. Richardson =

American professional basketball player (born 1991)

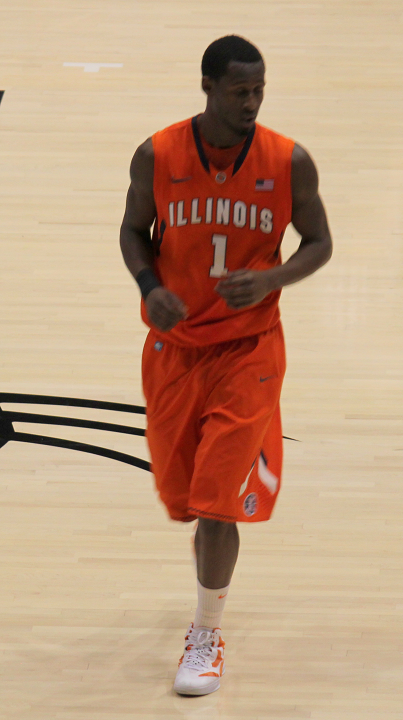
- Richardson playing for Illinois in January, 2012

No. 11 – Free agent
- Position: Shooting guard

Personal information
- Born: February 11, 1991 (age 35) Peoria, Illinois
- Listed height: 6 ft 3 in (1.91 m)
- Listed weight: 195 lb (88 kg)

Career information
- High school: Peoria Central (Peoria, Illinois); Findlay Prep (Henderson, Nevada)
- College: Illinois (2009–2013)
- NBA draft: 2013: undrafted
- Playing career: 2013–2019

Career history
- 2013: Güssing Knights
- 2014–2015: Korikobrat
- 2015–2016: Kouvot
- 2016–2017: Spirou Charleroi
- 2017: s.Oliver Würzburg
- 2017–2018: Stal Ostrów Wielkopolski
- 2018: Aries Trikala
- 2018–2019: Aix Maurienne Savoie

Career highlights
- Finnish League MVP (2016); Finnish League Finals MVP (2016); Finnish League champion (2016); Big Ten Freshman of the Year (2010); Big Ten All-Freshman team (2010); Third-team All-Big Ten – Coaches (2013); Fourth-team Parade All-American (2009)

Dietrich James "D. J." Richardson (born February 11, 1991) is an American professional basketball player who last played for Aix Maurienne Savoie Basket of the LNB Pro B. He attended Peoria Central for his first three years of high school and transferred to Findlay Prep in Henderson, Nevada for his senior year. He played collegiately at the University of Illinois.

== High school ==
As a junior at Peoria Central Richardson was selected to first-team All-State by the Champaign-Urbana News-Gazette and second-team All-State by the AP and Chicago Sun-Times. In his senior year at Findlay College Prep, Richardson, along with Texas recruit Avery Bradley, led the Findlay College Prep Pilots to a high school national championship after beating Oak Hill 74-66 and finishing their season 33-0.

College recruiting
Name	Hometown	School	Height	Weight	Commit date
D.J. Richardson; SG	Peoria, IL	Findlay College Prep	6 ft 3 in (1.91 m)	180 lb (82 kg)	Oct 11, 2007
D.J. Richardson; SG	Recruit ratings: Scout: Rivals: (93)				
Overall recruit ranking: Scout: #12 (SG) Rivals: #38 (overall) ESPN: #46 (overall)
Note: In many cases, Scout, Rivals, 247Sports, On3, and ESPN may conflict in their listings of height and weight.; In these cases, the average was taken. ESPN grades are on a 100-point scale.; Sources: "Illinois Commit List for 2009". Rivals.; "Men's Basketball Recruiting". Scout.; "ESPN - Illinois Fighting Illini Basketball Recruiting 2009". ESPN.; "Scout.com Team Recruiting Rankings". Scout.; "2009 Team Ranking". Rivals.

== College career ==
Richardson joined fellow 2009 recruits, including Brandon Paul, on the University of Illinois 2009–10 men's basketball team coached by Bruce Weber. Andy Katz of ESPN called Richardson and Paul "the best freshman backcourt not at Kentucky John Wall and Eric Bledsoe". Richardson was named Big Ten Freshman of the Year by the coaches and was unanimously selected to the Big Ten All-Freshman team. Richardson finished his career ranked 13th on Illini all-time scoring list (1,477 points, third in made 3-pointers (278), and tied for third in games played (138). After his senior season, Richardson was selected to participate in the Portsmouth Invitational Tournament.

=== College statistics ===
Legend
GP	Games played	GS	Games started	MPG	Minutes per game
FG%	Field goal percentage	3P%	3-point field goal percentage	FT%	Free throw percentage
RPG	Rebounds per game	APG	Assists per game	SPG	Steals per game
BPG	Blocks per game	PPG	Points per game	**Bold**	Career high

Year	Team	GP	GS	MPG	FG%	3P%	FT%	RPG	APG	SPG	BPG	PPG
2009–10	Illinois	36	35	30.9	.399	.390	.775	2.7	2.1	0.7	0.2	10.5
2010–11	Illinois	34	30	26.8	.415	.385	.758	1.8	1.9	0.7	0.2	8.4
2011–12	Illinois	32	31	34.7	.387	.348	.774	3.0	1.7	0.8	0.2	11.6
2012–13	Illinois	36	36	33.8	.363	.322	.815	3.9	1.6	1.3	0.2	14.5
**Career**		138	132	31.5	.388	.355	.787	2.8	1.8	0.9	0.2	13.6

== Professional career ==
After going undrafted in the 2013 NBA draft, Richardson worked out for the Utah Jazz in mid-September 2013. On October 24, 2013, Richardson signed to play professionally in Austria for the UBC Güssing Knights. In January 2014 Richardson signed to play for Toros de Aragua of the Venezuelan Professional Basketball League, however he suffered an ankle injury that forced the team to cut him before playing a game.

On July 31, 2014 Richardson signed with Korikobrat which competes as a member of the Korisliiga in Finland. After that season, he signed with Kouvot from the same Korisliiga for the 2015–16 season. He eventually won the Finnish championship with Kouvot.

On February 26, 2018, Richardson joined Aries Trikala of the Greek Basket League.
