= Darius Paul =

American basketball player (born 1994)

No. 11 – Albany Patroons
- Position: Small forward
- League: NAPB

Personal information
- Born: April 8, 1994 (age 32) Gurnee, Illinois, U.S.
- Listed height: 6 ft 8 in (2.03 m)
- Listed weight: 220 lb (100 kg)

Career information
- High school: Warren Township (Gurnee, Illinois)
- College: Western Michigan (2012–2013); Lamar State–Port Arthur (2014–2015); Robert Morris – Chicago (2016–2017)
- NBA draft: 2017: undrafted
- Playing career: 2017–present

Career history
- 2017: Petrolero Argentino
- 2018: Vancouver Knights
- 2019: Albany Patroons
- 2020: Los Colorodos

Darius Paul (born April 8, 1994) is an American professional basketball player for the Albany Patroons of North American Premier Basketball

Collegiately, he played for Robert Morris University in the NAIA, for Western Michigan University in the National Collegiate Athletic Association and was a member of the University of Illinois basketball team, but never appeared in a game.

== High school career ==
Paul played for Warren Township High School. As a high school senior, Paul was named a member of the 2012 Illinois All-State Team as selected by the Associated Press, Chicago Tribune, Chicago Sun-Times, News-Gazette, and the Illinois Basketball Coaches Association. Through his college recruitment, Paul received interest from Northwestern and Iowa and received scholarship offers from Bradley University, Detroit, IUPUI, Florida Gulf Coast, and Western Michigan. On November 25, 2011, Paul committed to play for Steve Hawkins at Western Michigan.

College recruiting
Name	Hometown	School	Height	Weight	Commit date
Darius Paul; PF	Gurnee, IL	Warren Township HS / Western Michigan / Lamar State College–Port Arthur	6 ft 8 in (2.03 m)	225 lb (102 kg)	Dec 11, 2014
Darius Paul; PF	Recruit ratings: Rivals: 247Sports:				
Overall recruit ranking: 247Sports: 18 (Junior College)
Note: In many cases, Scout, Rivals, 247Sports, On3, and ESPN may conflict in their listings of height and weight.; In these cases, the average was taken. ESPN grades are on a 100-point scale.; Sources:

== College career ==
=== Freshman ===
Entering Western Michigan during the 2012–13 season, Paul quickly became a key contributor, as he started 33 of 35 games, averaging 10.5 points and 5.7 rebounds per game. Paul also led all Mid-American Conference freshman in scoring and rebounding, recording five double-doubles throughout the season. He was named Mid-American Conference Freshman of the Year at the conclusion of the season.

=== Redshirt sophomore ===
After announcing his decision to transfer from Western Michigan, Paul announced via Twitter on May 4, 2013, that he would play for John Groce at Illinois, following in the footsteps of his older brother Brandon Paul. Paul also had scholarship offers to Florida, Iowa State, Marquette, Miami (Fl.), Missouri, Nebraska, and Nevada.

Due to NCAA transfer rules, Paul was forced to sit out during the 2013–2014 season. During the season Paul only participated in practices and attended home games at the State Farm Center as an observer. In April 2014, Paul was suspended from the team after being arrested for underage drinking and after resisting arrest. .He pleased guilty to the drinking charge, the resisting arrest charge was dropped. He then went on to spend the 2014–15 season at junior college Lamar State.

=== Junior College ===
Paul recorded the fifth triple-double in Lamar State College–Port Arthur Seahawks history in a win over Victoria College, posting a line of 21 points, 13 rebounds and 11 assists. During his junior college season, Paul was also named a top five junior college recruit by the Sporting News. On November 12, 2014, Paul signed his National Letter of Intent to return to Illinois during the 2015–16 season as a redshirt junior. For the 2014–15 season, Paul led the Seahawks in points per game and rebounds per game, averaging a double-double for the majority of the season.

=== Back at Illinois ===
He returned to the University of Illinois for the 2015–16 season. During an exhibition tour in Deauville, France in August 2015, Paul was charged with vandalism, public intoxication and resisting arrest, he was sent home and later dismissed from the team.

=== Senior ===
Paul spent his senior year (2016–17) at Robert Morris University. Averaging 18.7 points, having made 43-of-91 from beyond the arc on the season, 7.9 rebounds, 1.6 assists and 1.1 blocked shots per game, he earned NAIA Division II All-American Honorable Mention Team honors.

=== College statistics ===
Legend
GP	Games played	GS	Games started	MPG	Minutes per game
FG%	Field goal percentage	3P%	3-point field goal percentage	FT%	Free throw percentage
RPG	Rebounds per game	APG	Assists per game	SPG	Steals per game
BPG	Blocks per game	PPG	Points per game	**Bold**	Career high

Year	Team	GP	GS	MPG	FG%	3P%	FT%	RPG	APG	SPG	BPG	PPG
2012–13	Western Michigan	35	33	24.8	.466	.227	.658	5.7	1.7	0.5	0.4	10.5
2013–14	Illinois	Did not play due to NCAA transfer regulations										
2014–15	Lamar State–Port Arthur	22	20	-	.438	.280	.683	9.1	3.8	1.5	2.4	17.1
2015–16	Illinois	Did not play - Dismissed from team										
2016–17	Robert Morris – Chicago	29	23	26.5	.587	.473	.658	7.9	1.6	1.0	1.1	18.7

Updated July 3, 2017

== Professional basketball ==
Coming out of college, Paul signed with Petrolero Argentino of the Argentinian Liga Nacional de Básquet for the 2017–18 season, but was waived in November 2017.

Led the Albany Patroons to a TBL Championship for the in 2019 The Basketball League inaugural season. Also received the TBL "Most Valuable Player" honor

== Personal ==
Paul is the son of Cliff Sr. and Lynda Paul and he has two brothers, Cliff Jr. and former Fighting Illini basketball player Brandon Paul. Brandon last played for the San Antonio Spurs of the NBA.
