= Gary Harris =

American basketball player (born 1994)

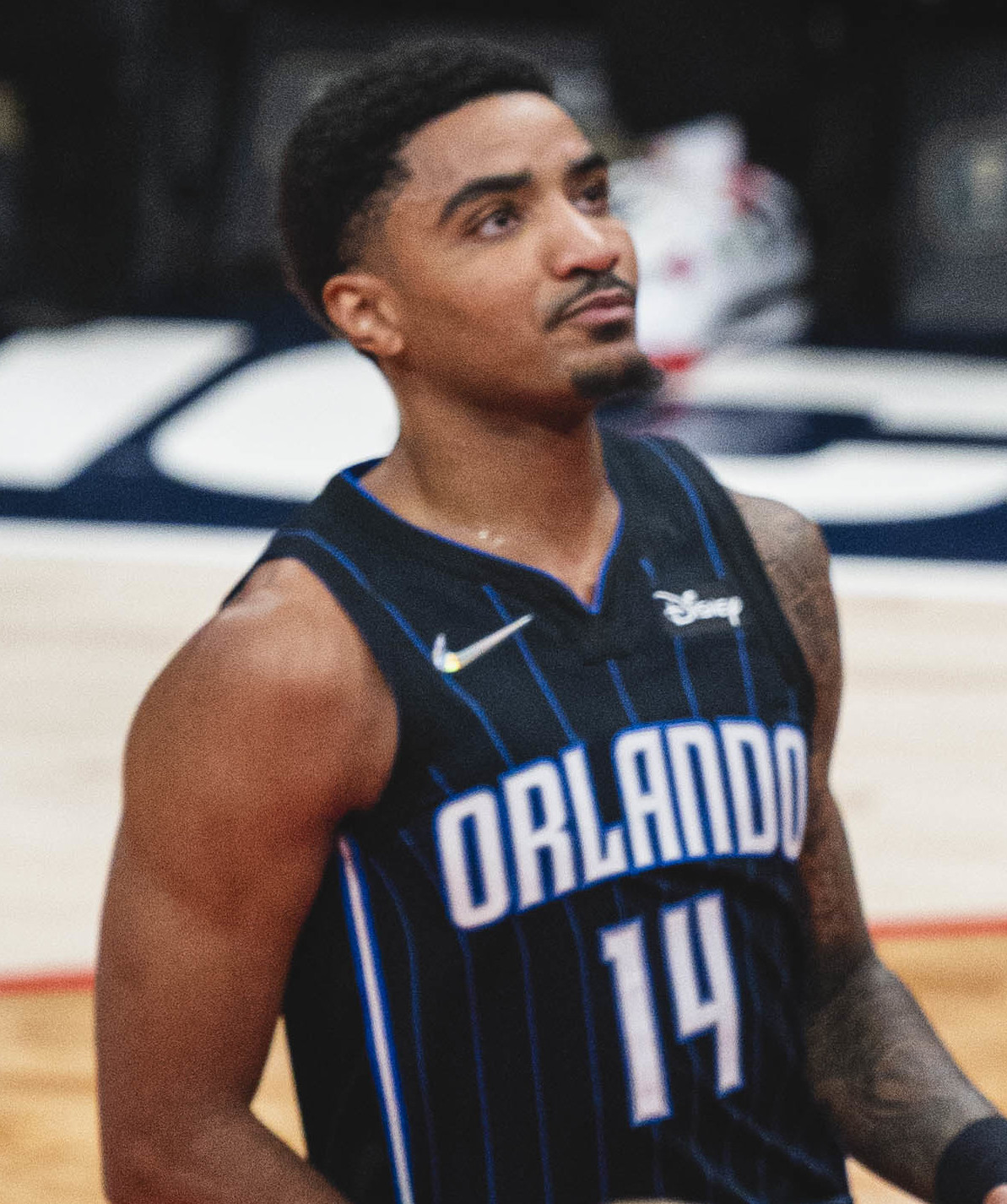
- Harris with the Orlando Magic in 2022

Free agent
- Position: Shooting guard

Personal information
- Born: September 14, 1994 (age 32) Fishers, Indiana, U.S.
- Listed height: 6 ft 4 in (1.93 m)
- Listed weight: 210 lb (95 kg)

Career information
- High school: Hamilton Southeastern (Fishers, Indiana)
- College: Michigan State (2012–2014)
- NBA draft: 2014: 1st round, 19th overall pick
- Drafted by: Chicago Bulls
- Playing career: 2014–present

Career history
- 2014–2021: Denver Nuggets
- 2021–2025: Orlando Magic
- 2025–2026: Milwaukee Bucks

Career highlights
- First-team All-Big Ten (2014); Second-team All-Big Ten (2013); Big Ten All-Defensive Team (2014); Big Ten Freshman of the Year (2013); Big Ten All-Freshman Team (2013); First-team Parade All-American (2012); McDonald's All-American (2012); Indiana Mr. Basketball (2012)
- Stats at NBA.com
- Stats at Basketball Reference

Gary Harris Jr. (born September 14, 1994) is an American professional basketball player who last played for the Milwaukee Bucks of the National Basketball Association (NBA). He played college basketball for the Michigan State Spartans. Harris was selected by the Chicago Bulls with the 19th overall pick in the 2014 NBA Draft, subsequently traded to the Denver Nuggets. He has also played for the Orlando Magic.

== High school career ==
Harris attended Hamilton Southeastern High School in Fishers, Indiana. As a sophomore in 2009–10, he averaged 14 points, four rebounds, two assists and three steals per game as he led Hamilton SE to a 17–4 record. As a junior in 2010–11, he averaged 18.6 points, 5.0 rebounds, 3.0 assists and 2.7 steals per game as he led the Royals to a 20–4 record and a trip to the Class 4A regional finals, capturing just the second sectional championship in school history.

In November 2011, Harris signed a National Letter of Intent to play college basketball for Michigan State University.

As a senior in 2011–12, Harris averaged 25.4 points, 7.4 rebounds, 3.1 assists and 4.0 steals per game as he led the Royals to a 22–3 record, advancing to the Class 4A sectional final. He finished his high school career with a school-record 1,540 points (16.7 ppg), 467 rebounds (5.1 rpg), 232 assists (2.5 apg) and 232 steals (2.5 spg).

Harris was rated among the top players in the nation by ESPNU100 (No. 11), Scout.com (No. 16) and Rivals.com (No. 25). He was also ranked among the nation's top shooting guards by ESPNU100 (No. 2), Scout.com (No. 4) and Rivals.com (No. 7).

Harris was also an outstanding football player at Hamilton SE, playing wide receiver in his sophomore, junior and senior years. He won three league championships, while also adding a sectional championship as a senior.

== College career ==
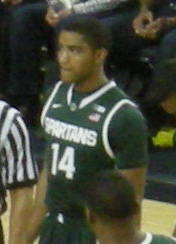
Harris with Michigan State in 2013

As a freshman at Michigan State University in 2012–13, Harris was named the Big Ten Freshman of the Year, becoming the first Spartan to win the award since 1986. He was also a second-team All-Big Ten selection and a Big Ten All-Freshman Team honoree. In 34 games (33 starts), he averaged 12.9 points, 2.5 rebounds, 1.4 assists and 1.2 steals in 29.7 minutes per game.

As a sophomore in 2013–14, Harris earned first-team All-Big Ten, All-Big Ten Defensive Team, USBWA All-District selection, first-team NABC All-District, and an honorable mention Associated Press All-American honors. In the season-opener against McNeese State, he recorded his first career double-double with 20 points and 10 rebounds. On January 25, 2014, he recorded a career-high 27 points against Michigan. In 35 games, he averaged 16.7 points, 4.0 rebounds, 2.7 assists and 1.8 steals in 32.3 minutes per game.

On April 14, 2014, Harris declared for the NBA draft, forgoing his final two years of college eligibility.

== Professional career ==
=== Denver Nuggets (2014–2021) ===
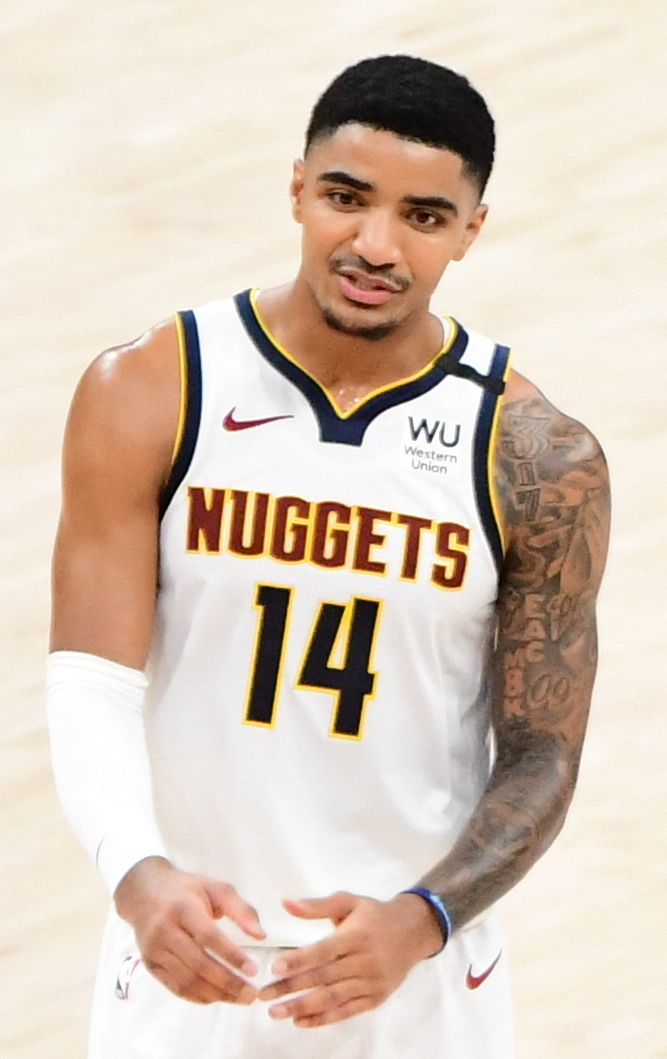
Harris with the Denver Nuggets in 2020

On June 26, 2014, Harris was selected with the 19th overall pick in the 2014 NBA draft by the Chicago Bulls. He was later traded to the Denver Nuggets on draft night along with Jusuf Nurkić (16th pick) and a second-round pick for Doug McDermott (11th pick) and Anthony Randolph. On July 31, he signed his rookie-scale contract with the Nuggets after averaging 18.6 points, 4.2 rebounds, 2.6 steals and 2.0 assists in five Summer League games for the team. After missing the first seven games of the 2014–15 season due to a back injury, Harris made his NBA debut on November 14 against the Indiana Pacers. In 18 minutes of action, he recorded 13 points, 3 rebounds, 2 assists, 2 steals and 1 block in a 108–87 win. He did not manage to eclipse that scoring total for the rest of the season, tying his season high of 13 points in the second-last game of the season against the Los Angeles Clippers.

In July 2015, Harris re-joined the Nuggets for the 2015 NBA Summer League. On October 11, the Nuggets exercised their third-year team option on Harris's rookie-scale contract, extending the contract through the 2016–17 season. He earned the Nuggets' starting shooting guard spot for the 2015–16 season, going on to score a then career-high 20 points on November 20 in a loss to the Phoenix Suns. Harris missed a string of six games between November 28 and December 8 due to a concussion he suffered against the San Antonio Spurs on November 27. He returned to action on December 11 against the Minnesota Timberwolves, starting in his 17th game of the season and scoring 12 points in a 111–108 win. In the following game on December 14, Harris scored a career-high 21 points in a 114–108 win over the Houston Rockets. He tied that career high on December 22, scoring 21 points in a loss to the Los Angeles Lakers. Harris had another 21-point effort on March 4, 2016, in an overtime loss to the Brooklyn Nets. In 2015–16, Harris was just one of seven players to average 12-plus points, shoot 47% from the field, 35% from three, and 81% from the free throw line. During the 2016 off-season, he was part of the USA Men's Select Team, a team selected to train with the USA Basketball men's national team in preparation for the 2016 Rio Summer Olympics.

In July 2016, Harris re-joined the Nuggets for the 2016 NBA Summer League. On October 5, 2016, he was ruled out for four to six weeks with a partially torn right groin. On October 21, the Nuggets exercised their fourth-year team option on Harris's rookie-scale contract, extending the contract through the 2017–18 season. He missed the first four games of the 2016–17 season with the groin injury, but upon returning to action in early November, he sustained a foot injury after just five games. He was subsequently sidelined for up to four weeks. In his first game back on December 15 after missing 16 straight, Harris scored 18 points in a 132–120 win over the Portland Trail Blazers. Four days later, he scored a career-high 24 points in a 117–107 win over the Dallas Mavericks. On February 24, 2017, he set a new career high with 25 points in a 129–109 win over the Brooklyn Nets. He bested that mark on March 8, 2017, scoring 26 points in a 123–113 loss to the Washington Wizards. On March 20, 2017, he set a new career high with 28 points in a 125–124 loss to the Houston Rockets.

On October 12, 2017, Harris signed a four-year, $84 million contract extension with the Nuggets. On December 13, 2017, he scored a career-high 36 points in a 124–118 loss to the Boston Celtics. On January 3, 2018, he scored 28 of his 36 points in the first half of the Nuggets' 134–111 win over the Phoenix Suns. On February 1, 2018, he made the winning three-pointer at the buzzer and finished with 25 points to lift the Nuggets to a 127–124 victory over the Oklahoma City Thunder. On April 9, 2018, Harris returned from an 11-game absence to score 12 points off the bench in an 88–82 win over the Portland Trail Blazers.

Harris missed 11 games in December due to a right hip injury, and five games in January with hamstring tightness. He later missed seven games with a right adductor strain.

=== Orlando Magic (2021–2025) ===
On March 25, 2021, Harris, R. J. Hampton and a future first-round pick were traded to the Orlando Magic in exchange for Aaron Gordon and Gary Clark.

On June 30, 2022, Harris signed a two-year, $26 million contract extension with the Magic. On August 27, Harris underwent surgery to repair a torn meniscus in his left knee. On December 29, he was suspended by the NBA for one game without pay due to coming off the bench during an altercation in a game against the Detroit Pistons the day before.

On July 6, 2024, Harris signed a new two-year contract, $14 million deal with the Magic. He made 48 appearances (three starts) for Orlando during the 2024–25 NBA season, averaging 3.0 points, 1.3 rebounds, and 0.6 assists. On June 16, 2025, the Magic had declined a team option that would have extended Harris' contract, rendering him a free agent.

=== Milwaukee Bucks (2025–2026) ===
On July 8, 2025, Harris signed a two-year, $7.45 million contract with the Milwaukee Bucks.

On July 8, 2026, Harris alongside Taurean Prince was traded to the Detroit Pistons in exchange for Caris LeVert and two future picks, as part of a six-team, 11-player trade. On September 28, 2026, Harris was waived by the Pistons.

== Career statistics ==
Legend
GP	Games played	GS	Games started	MPG	Minutes per game
FG%	Field goal percentage	3P%	3-point field goal percentage	FT%	Free throw percentage
RPG	Rebounds per game	APG	Assists per game	SPG	Steals per game
BPG	Blocks per game	PPG	Points per game	**Bold**	Career high

=== NBA ===
==== Regular season ====
Year	Team	GP	GS	MPG	FG%	3P%	FT%	RPG	APG	SPG	BPG	PPG
2014–15	Denver	55	6	13.1	.304	.204	.745	1.2	.5	.7	.1	3.4
2015–16	Denver	**76**	**76**	32.1	.469	.354	.820	2.9	1.9	1.3	.2	12.3
2016–17	Denver	57	56	31.3	**.503**	.420	.776	**3.1**	**2.9**	1.2	.1	14.9
2017–18	Denver	67	65	**34.4**	.485	.396	.827	2.6	**2.9**	**1.8**	.2	**17.5**
2018–19	Denver	57	48	28.8	.424	.339	.799	2.8	2.2	1.0	.3	12.9
2019–20	Denver	56	55	31.8	.420	.333	.815	2.9	2.1	1.4	.3	10.4
2020–21	Denver	19	19	30.6	.442	.320	.733	2.5	1.7	.9	.2	9.7
2020–21	Orlando	20	19	24.9	.365	.364	.875	1.6	2.3	.6	**.4**	10.2
2021–22	Orlando	61	30	28.4	.434	.384	.874	2.0	1.8	1.0	.1	11.1
2022–23	Orlando	48	42	24.7	.450	**.431**	**.900**	2.0	1.2	.9	.3	8.3
2023–24	Orlando	54	27	24.0	.441	.371	.756	1.7	1.6	.9	.3	6.9
2024–25	Orlando	48	3	14.8	.383	.356	.583	1.3	.6	.5	.3	3.0
2025–26	Milwaukee	48	2	13.8	.442	.412	.889	1.3	1.1	.6	.2	2.7
Career		666	448	26.0	.446	.370	.810	2.32	1.8	1.0	.2	9.9

==== Playoffs ====
Year	Team	GP	GS	MPG	FG%	3P%	FT%	RPG	APG	SPG	BPG	PPG
2019	Denver	**14**	**14**	**37.0**	**.462**	.351	.868	**4.1**	**2.3**	.9	**.6**	**14.2**
2020	Denver	**14**	12	27.1	.378	**.365**	.773	2.0	1.7	1.1	.3	7.4
2024	Orlando	6	6	26.5	.286	.318	**1.000**	2.0	.7	**1.2**	.5	4.2
2025	Orlando	5	0	16.6	.375	.167	.0	1.0	.6	.6	.2	1.4
Career		39	32	29.2	.415	.343	.839	2.6	1.6	1.0	.4	8.6

=== College ===
Year	Team	GP	GS	MPG	FG%	3P%	FT%	RPG	APG	SPG	BPG	PPG
2012–13	Michigan State	34	33	29.7	**.456**	**.411**	.755	2.5	1.4	1.3	.2	12.9
2013–14	Michigan State	**35**	**34**	**32.3**	.429	.352	**.810**	**4.0**	**2.7**	**1.8**	**.4**	**16.7**
Career		69	67	31.0	.440	.376	.778	3.3	2.0	1.6	.3	14.9

== Awards and honors ==
- 2012 Indiana Mr. Basketball
- 2012 Jordan Brand Classic game invitee
- 2012 Indiana Gatorade Player of the Year
- 2012 Indiana All-Star
- 2012 Indiana-Kentucky All-Star series MVP
- 2012 First-team Parade All-American
- 2011 Indiana Junior All-Star
- 2011 All-Hoosier Cross Roads Conference
- 2011 Indianapolis Star First Team honoree
- 2011 Hamilton County Player of the Year
- 2011 Hoosier Basketball Magazine All-State selection

== Personal life ==
Harris is the son of Gary and Joy Harris (née Holmes). His mother played college basketball for the Purdue Boilermakers and professionally in the Women's National Basketball Association (WNBA) for the Detroit Shock.
