= Andre Hollins =

American basketball player

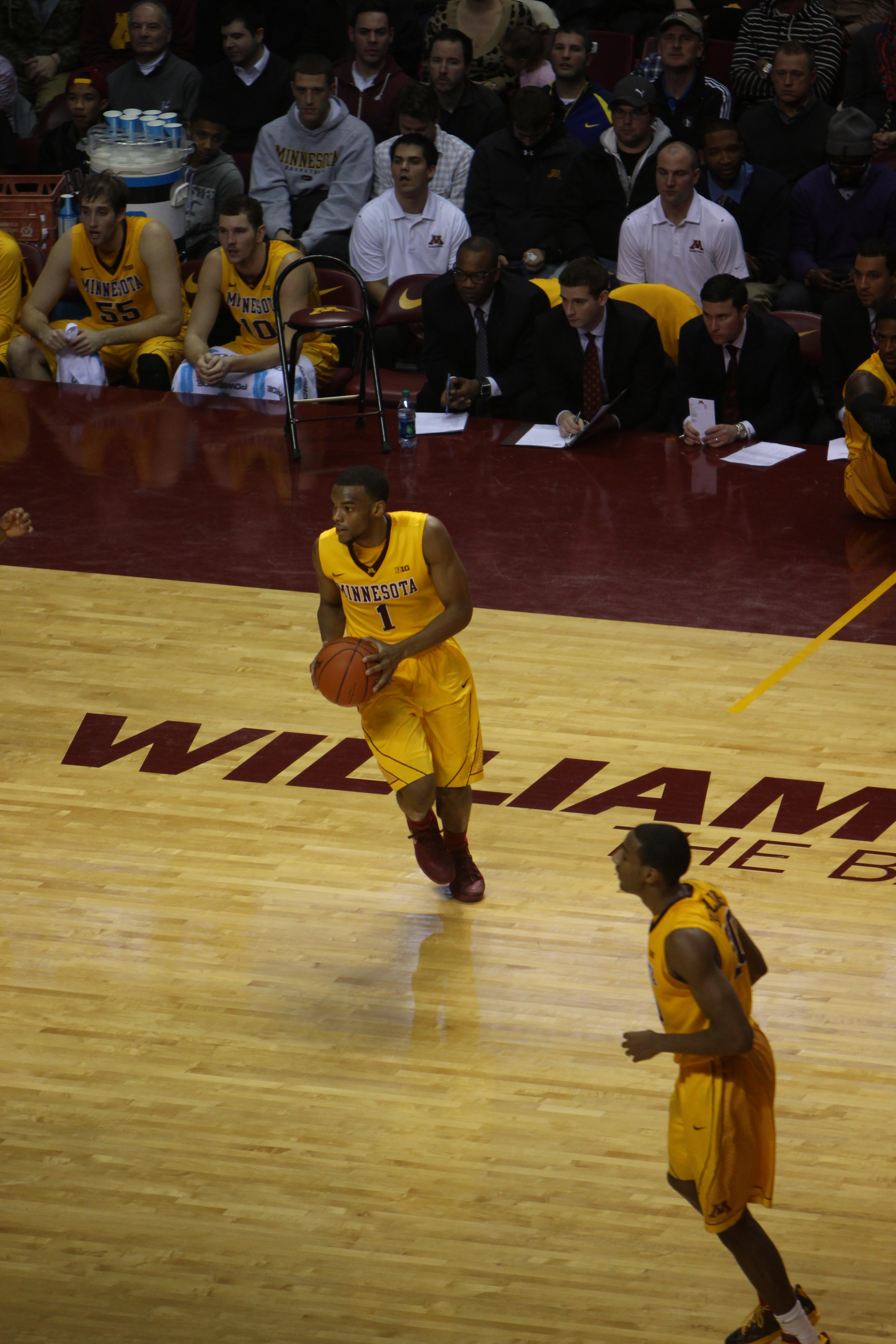
- Andre Hollins with the Minnesota Golden Gophers

Free agent
- Position: Guard

Personal information
- Born: December 11, 1992 (age 33) Memphis, Tennessee
- Listed height: 6 ft 2 in (1.88 m)

Career information
- High school: White Station (Memphis, Tennessee)
- College: Minnesota (2011–2015)
- NBA draft: 2015: undrafted
- Playing career: 2015–present

Career history
- 2015–2016: Leuven Bears
- 2016–2017: Chorale Roanne
- 2017: Braunschweig
- 2017–2018: BC Körmend
- 2018: Nevėžis Kėdainiai
- 2018: Helsinki Seagulls
- 2018: Umeå BSKT

Career highlights
- Pro B Leaders Cup winner (2017); Belgian League steals leader (2016); Class AAA Tennessee Mr. Basketball (2011)

Andre Hollins (born December 11, 1992) is an American professional basketball player

He grew up in Memphis, Tennessee and went to White Station High School there. He went to the University of Minnesota and played for the Minnesota Golden Gophers during college and entered the NBA draft in 2015, but was undrafted and became an Unrestricted FA.

He has since played in Europe and is currently with the Hungarian League. On January 2, 2022 it was announced on social media that he and current Chicago Sky star Rachel Banham were getting married as the couple were at Williams Arena for a proposal.
