= Jared Berggren =

American basketball player (born 1990)

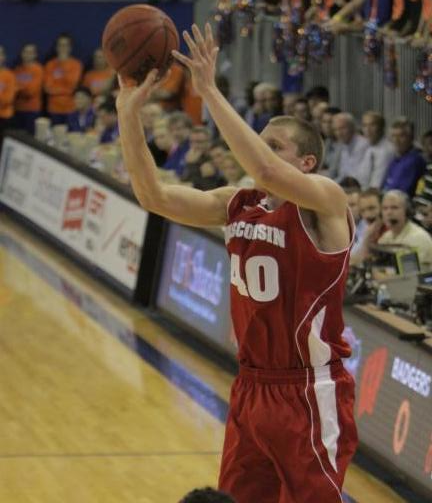

Personal information
- Born: April 2, 1990 (age 36) Coon Rapids, Minnesota, U.S.
- Listed height: 6 ft 10 in (2.08 m)
- Listed weight: 235 lb (107 kg)

Career information
- High school: Princeton (Princeton, Minnesota)
- College: Wisconsin (2009–2013)
- NBA draft: 2013: undrafted
- Playing career: 2013–2019
- Position: Center

Career history
- 2013–2015: B.C. Oostende
- 2015–2016: Pallacanestro Cantù
- 2016: Aquila Basket Trento
- 2016–2017: Basket Brescia Leonessa
- 2017–2018: Niigata Albirex BB
- 2018: Shinshu Brave Warriors
- 2018–2019: Union Neuchâtel Basket

Career highlights
- 2× Belgian League champions; Second-team All-Big Ten (2013)

Jared Berggren (ジャレッド・バーグレン) (born April 2, 1990) is an American professional basketball player who most recently played for Union Neuchâtel in Switzerland.

== College career ==
He played four seasons with the Wisconsin Badgers, averaging 7.2 points, 3.8 rebounds and 1.2 blocks per game. In his senior season, he was named to the Second Team All Big Ten Conference by both by both the media and the coaches, and was also recognized as a member of the conference's best defensive team.

== Professional career ==
After going undrafted in the 2013 NBA Draft, he signed with B.C. Oostende of the Belgian league. In his first season with the team, he averaged 7.0 points and 5.0 rebounds per game. After a challenging second season, he signed a one-year contract with Pallacanestro Cantù of the Italian league in July 2015. He played 14 games, averaging at 6.8 points and 5.2 rebounds, before being released in February 2016.

The following day, he signed with Aquila Basket Trento for the remainder of the season, playing eleven games and averaging 4.0 points and 3.2 rebounds.

In August 2016, he signed a one-year contract with the Basket Brescia Leonessa. He spent the 2017–18 season with Shinshu Brave Warriors in Japan.

On July 9, 2018, Berggren signed a one-year contract with Union Neuchâtel.
