= Derrick Nix (basketball) =

American basketball player (born 1990)

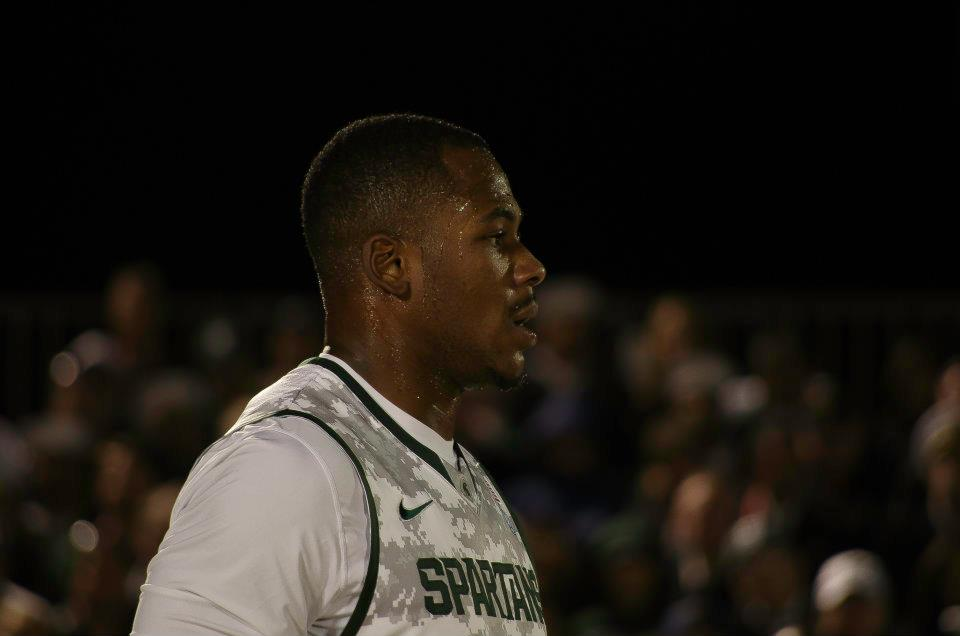
- Nix playing for the Michigan State Spartans in the 2011 Carrier Classic.

Personal information
- Born: December 11, 1990 (age 35) Detroit, Michigan, U.S.
- Listed height: 6 ft 8 in (2.03 m)
- Listed weight: 270 lb (122 kg)

Career information
- High school: Pershing (Detroit, Michigan)
- College: Michigan State (2009–2013)
- NBA draft: 2013: undrafted
- Playing career: 2013–2023
- Position: Center

Career history
- 2013–2014: VEF Rīga
- 2014–2015: Orléans Loiret Basket
- 2015: Czarni Słupsk
- 2015–2016: Grand Rapids Drive
- 2016: BK Ventspils
- 2017–2019: Windy City Bulls
- 2019–2020: Windsor Express
- 2022–2023: Vera Tbilisi

Career highlights
- Latvian League All-Star (2014); Mr. Basketball of Michigan (2009)

Derrick Nix (born December 11, 1990) is an American former professional basketball player. He played college basketball for the Michigan State Spartans.

== High school career ==
Nix attended Pershing High School where he averaged 15 points and 15 rebounds as a senior, leading Pershing to the Class A State title and earning a Detroit Free Press Class A All-State selection, and All-Metro and All-Detroit honors.

== College career ==
Nix played college basketball for Michigan State University. In his freshman year, he made the 2010 NCAA Final Four. Nix had his best season with the Spartans in his senior year when he averaged 9.9 points, 6.6 rebounds and 1.6 assists as Michigan State made NCAA Sweet 16.

== Professional career ==
After completing four seasons at MSU, Nix went undrafted in the 2013 NBA draft. In July 2013, he signed a three-year deal Slovenian club KK Krka, but left the team in preseason. In October 2013, Nix joined Latvian powerhouse VEF Rīga. He left the club in April 2014 for personal reasons.

On July 22, 2014, he signed a one-year deal with Orléans Loiret Basket of France. On February 3, 2015, he parted ways with Orléans.

On October 15, 2015, Nix signed with Czarni Słupsk of the Polish Basketball League. On November 12, he parted ways with Słupsk after appearing in five games. On December 21, he was acquired by the Grand Rapids Drive of the NBA Development League. Two days later, he made his debut for Grand Rapids in a 113–111 victory over the Canton Charge. On February 16, 2016, he was waived by Grand Rapids. Four days later, he signed with Latvian club BK Ventspils for the rest of the season.
