= Brandon Paul =

American basketball player (born 1991)

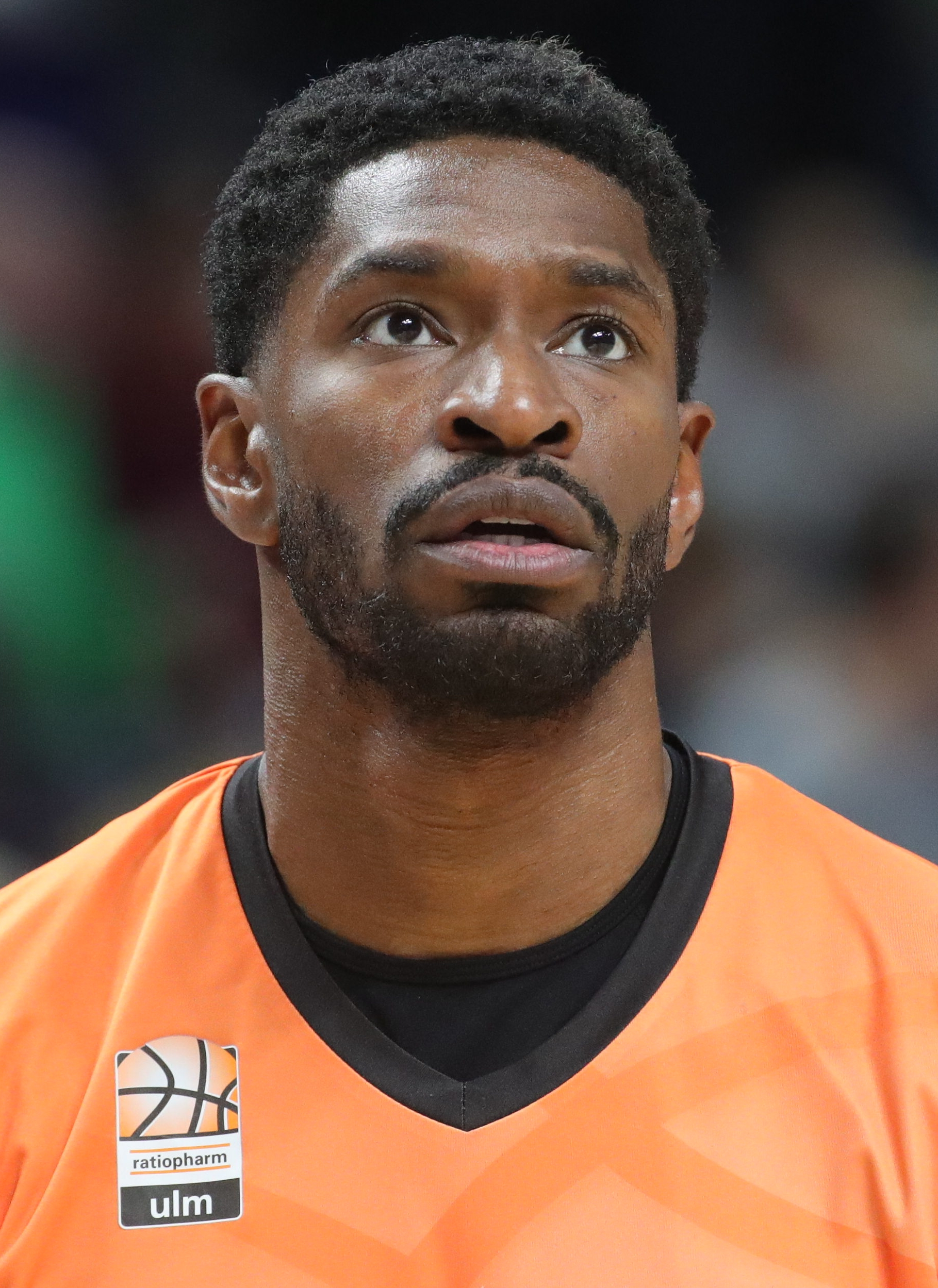
- Paul playing for Ulm in May 2023

Personal information
- Born: April 30, 1991 (age 35) Gurnee, Illinois, U.S.
- Listed height: 6 ft 4 in (1.93 m)
- Listed weight: 200 lb (91 kg)

Career information
- High school: Warren (Gurnee, Illinois)
- College: Illinois (2009–2013)
- NBA draft: 2013: undrafted
- Playing career: 2013–2025
- Position: Shooting guard / small forward

Career history
- 2013–2014: Nizhny Novgorod
- 2014–2015: Canton Charge
- 2015–2016: Joventut
- 2016–2017: Anadolu Efes
- 2017–2018: San Antonio Spurs
- 2018: →Austin Spurs
- 2019: Zhejiang Golden Bulls
- 2019–2020: Olympiacos
- 2020: Zhejiang Golden Bulls
- 2021: Adelaide 36ers
- 2021: Club Joventut Badalona
- 2022: Shandong Hi-Speed Kirin
- 2022–2023: Ratiopharm Ulm
- 2023–2024: Budućnost VOLI
- 2024–2025: JL Bourg
- 2025: Élan Chalon
- 2025: Fuerza Regia de Monterrey

Career highlights
- Bundesliga champion (2023); All-Bundesliga Second Team (2023); 2× Third-team All-Big Ten (2012, 2013); Illinois Mr. Basketball (2009)
- Stats at NBA.com
- Stats at Basketball Reference

Brandon Stephan Paul (born April 30, 1991) is an American former professional basketball player. During his senior year at Warren Township High School, Paul was named Illinois Mr. Basketball for 2009. Paul played college basketball for the Illinois Fighting Illini and became only the second player in program history to record 1,500 points, 500 rebounds, 300 assists and 100 steals.

== High school career ==
Paul played for Warren Township High School. In high school, Paul was named a member of the 2009 Illinois All-American Team as selected by the Associated Press, Chicago Tribune, Chicago Sun-Times, News-Gazette, and the Illinois Basketball Coaches Association. After his senior season Paul was named Illinois Mr. Basketball for 2009, narrowly edging out his future University of Illinois teammate Jereme Richmond.

College recruiting
Name	Hometown	School	Height	Weight	Commit date
Brandon Paul; SG	Gurnee, IL	Warren Township High School	6 ft 3 in (1.91 m)	180 lb (82 kg)	Oct 11, 2007
Brandon Paul; SG	Recruit ratings: Scout: Rivals: (91)				
Overall recruit ranking: Scout: #15 (SG) Rivals: #10 (SG) ESPN: #87 (overall)
Note: In many cases, Scout, Rivals, 247Sports, On3, and ESPN may conflict in their listings of height and weight.; In these cases, the average was taken. ESPN grades are on a 100-point scale.; Sources: "Illinois Commit List for 2009". Rivals.; "Men's Basketball Recruiting". Scout.; "ESPN - Illinois Fighting Illini Basketball Recruiting 2009". ESPN.; "Scout.com Team Recruiting Rankings". Scout.; "2009 Team Ranking". Rivals.

== College career ==
Entering the University of Illinois during the 2009–10 season, Paul quickly became a key contributor, as he averaged 7.8 points and 3.1 rebounds per game in 18.9 minutes per game. As a sophomore, Paul played in all 34 games for the 2010–11 Illinois Fighting Illini men's basketball team. He averaged 22.4 minutes of playing time and continued as a key contributor. He averaged 9.0 points per game and reached double-figures in 13 games. Paul led his team in steals, averaging 1.1 per game, and was second in assists, averaging 2.1 per game. On February 13, 2011, Brandon scored a season-high 23 points in a 71–80 Illini loss to Purdue.

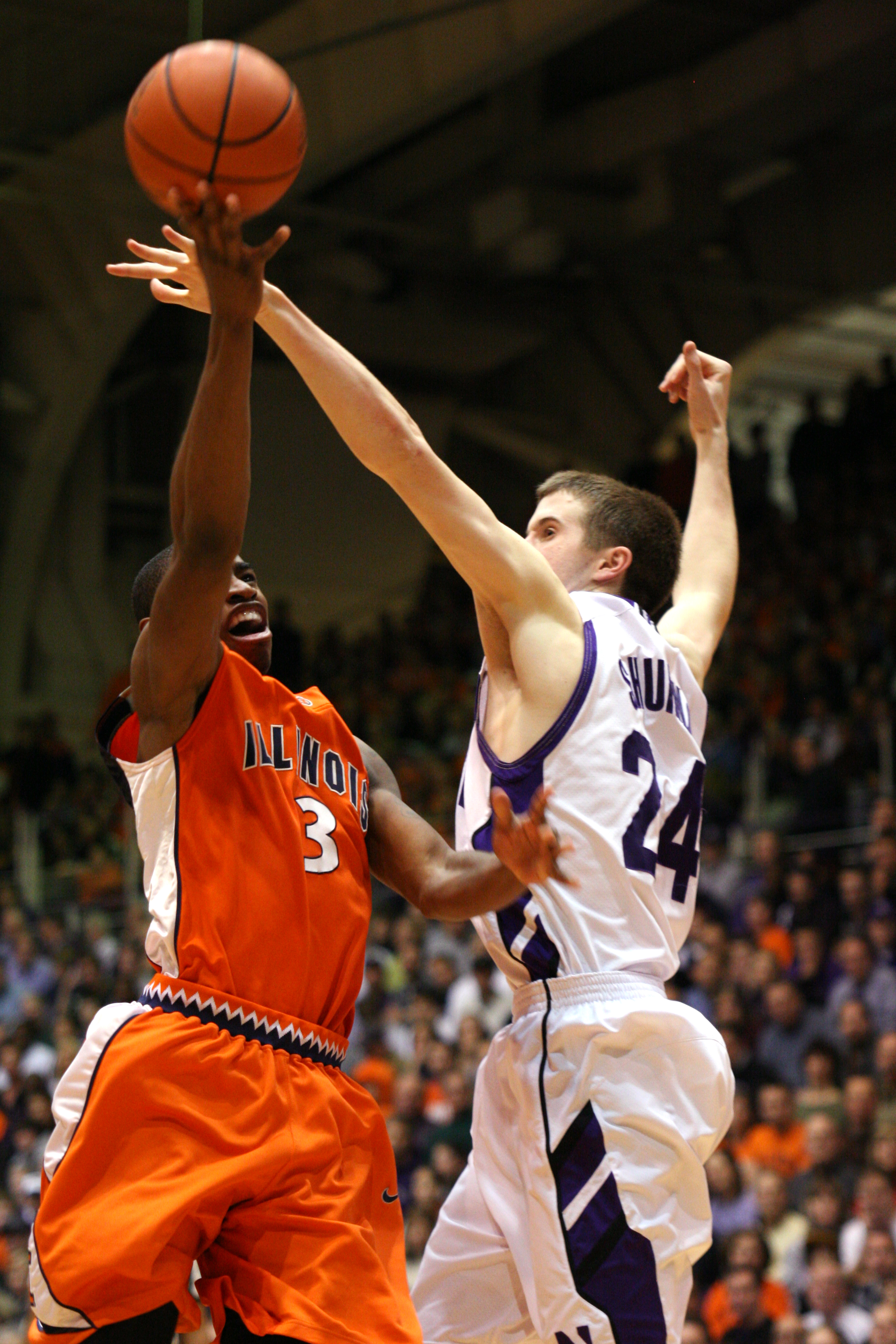
Paul drives against John Shurna in 2010

In his junior year, Paul earned the role of a full-time starter for the 2011–12 season. On January 10, 2012, Paul scored 43 points in an upset win over then ranked #3 Ohio State. It was the third highest scoring total in a single game by an Illinois men's basketball player while his eight three-pointers tied the school record.

As a senior, Paul led Illinois to win the Maui Invitational Tournament title in 2012 with a win over Butler in the championship game. Paul was named Most Valuable Player (MVP) of the tournament. During his senior season, Paul averaged 16.6 points a game over the course of 36 games. On March 14, 2013, Paul hit a game winning shot against Minnesota in the 2013 Big Ten Conference men's basketball tournament. After graduating, Paul became just the second Illini player to reach career milestones of 1,500 points, 500 rebounds, 300 assists and 100 steals and finished his college career as the eighth-leading scorer in school history with 1,654 points.

== Professional career ==
=== Nizhny Novgorod (2013–14) ===
After going undrafted in the 2013 NBA draft, Paul joined the Minnesota Timberwolves for the 2013 NBA Summer League. On August 10, 2013, Paul signed with Nizhny Novgorod of Russia for the 2013–14 season. In early February 2014, he left Russia after experiencing racism and a difficult language barrier. Paul returned to the United States after playing in 12 games and averaging 6.4 points, 2.7 rebounds and 0.5 steals in 13.8 minutes per game.

=== Canton Charge (2014–15) ===
On February 27, 2014, he was acquired by the Canton Charge of the NBA Development League. On March 14, 2014, he was waived by the Charge due to a season-ending injury.

On November 2, 2014, Paul was reacquired by the Canton Charge. On April 4, 2015, he was placed on the inactive list for the remainder of the season due to injury, and was waived two days later.

=== Joventut Badalona (2015–16) ===
On September 14, 2015, Paul signed with Spanish club FIATC Joventut. He started 25 of 33 games and led the team in scoring with 13 points per game.

=== Anadolu Efes (2016–17) ===
After playing for the Charlotte Hornets and the Philadelphia 76ers during the 2016 NBA Summer League, Paul signed with the 76ers on July 25, 2016, but was waived on October 24 after appearing in four preseason games. On December 13, 2016, he signed with Turkish club Anadolu Efes for the rest of the 2016–17 season.

=== San Antonio Spurs (2017–2018) ===
In July 2017, Paul joined the Dallas Mavericks in Orlando and the Cleveland Cavaliers in Las Vegas for the 2017 NBA Summer League. During summer league play, Paul averaged 15.6 points, 5.3 rebounds, 2.7 assists, and 1.7 steals per game on 47.12% shooting from the field. On July 14, 2017, he signed with the San Antonio Spurs. Paul had his debut in NBA on October 18, 2017, coming off the bench in a 107–99 win over the Minnesota Timberwolves. On October 30, 2017, Paul scored team-high 18 points with five rebounds, in a 108–94 loss to the Boston Celtics. On April 19, 2018, Paul made his debut in NBA playoffs, coming off from bench with an assist and a rebound in a 110–97 loss to the Golden State Warriors. On July 31, 2018, the Spurs waived Paul.

=== Zhejiang Golden Bulls (2019) ===
Paul signed with the Zhejiang Golden Bulls of the Chinese Basketball Association (CBA) on December 28, 2018. Paul made his CBA debut on January 4, scoring 40 points with eight rebounds, five assists and three steals in a 104–93 win over the Jilin Northeast Tigers. Five days later on January 9, Paul made his first triple-double in CBA, scoring 51 points with 17 rebounds, 11 assists and four steals in a 111–105 win over the Fujian Sturgeons.

=== Olympiacos (2019–20) ===
On July 6, 2019, Paul signed a two-year deal with the Greek EuroLeague club Olympiacos, Paul was released by Olympiacos on June 30, 2020.

=== Adelaide 36ers (2021) ===
On February 18, 2021, Paul signed with the Adelaide 36ers of the Australian National Basketball League for the remainder of the 2020–21 NBL season. He made his debut for the 36ers with a 25-point performance against the Perth Wildcats on March 14, 2021.

=== Joventut Badalona (2021) ===
On July 10, 2021, Paul signed with the Club Joventut Badalona of the Spanish Liga ACB a one-year deal.

=== ratiopharm Ulm (2022–2023) ===
On December 8, 2022, he signed with ratiopharm Ulm of the German Basketball Bundesliga (BBL). He was a regular contributor during Ulm's championship run in the 2022–23 Basketball Bundesliga season.

=== Budućnost VOLI (2023–2024) ===
On September 23, 2023, he signed with Budućnost VOLI of the Prva A Liga.

=== JL Bourg (2024–2025) ===
On July 5, 2024, he signed with JL Bourg of the LNB Pro A.

=== Elan Chalon (2025) ===
On February 24, 2025 Paul signed with Élan Chalon of LNB Élite.

== Player profile ==
Standing 6 feet 4 inches (1.93 m) and weighing 200 pounds (91 kg), Paul has a wingspan of 6 feet 10 inches (2.08 m) and primarily plays off the ball on offense as a shooting guard. Paul is known as a quick, athletic guard who is able to defend against point guards, shooting guards, and small forwards.

== Personal life ==
Paul is the son of Cliff Sr. and Lynda Paul. His mother Lynda played college basketball for Ball State University and coached Paul's Amateur Athletic Union (AAU) basketball team, the Illinois Hoopstars Paul's father, Cliff Sr., is police officer and a United States Navy veteran who served 13 years in the service. After the September 11 attacks in 2001, Cliff Sr. was stationed in Spain for six months. His dad also played semi-professional football with the Racine Raiders. He has two brothers, Cliff Jr. and Darius Paul. Darius played one season for Western Michigan before transferring to Illinois for the 2013–14 season as a redshirt sophomore.

== Career statistics ==
Legend
GP	Games played	GS	Games started	MPG	Minutes per game
FG%	Field-goal percentage	3P%	3-point field-goal percentage	FT%	Free-throw percentage
RPG	Rebounds per game	APG	Assists per game	SPG	Steals per game
BPG	Blocks per game	PPG	Points per game	PIR	Performance index rating
**Bold**	Career high

=== College ===
Year	Team	GP	GS	MPG	FG%	3P%	FT%	RPG	APG	SPG	BPG	PPG
2009–10	Illinois	36	15	18.9	.333	.279	.644	3.1	1.3	.8	.1	7.8
2010–11	Illinois	34	10	22.4	.399	.361	.767	3.1	2.1	1.1	.4	9.0
2011–12	Illinois	32	30	33.4	.392	.333	.727	4.7	2.9	1.4	.8	14.7
2012–13	Illinois	36	35	32.0	.401	.325	.738	4.4	2.7	1.2	.6	16.6

=== EuroLeague ===
Year	Team	GP	GS	MPG	FG%	3P%	FT%	RPG	APG	SPG	BPG	PPG	PIR
2016–17	Anadolu Efes	23	14	17.2	.340	.415	.703	1.0	.6	1.0	.3	8.6	5.8

=== NBA ===
==== Regular season ====
Year	Team	GP	GS	MPG	FG%	3P%	FT%	RPG	APG	SPG	BPG	PPG
2017–18	San Antonio	64	2	9.0	.433	.278	.512	1.1	.6	.4	.1	2.3
Career		64	2	9.0	.433	.278	.512	1.1	.6	.4	.1	2.3

==== Playoffs ====
Year	Team	GP	GS	MPG	FG%	3P%	FT%	RPG	APG	SPG	BPG	PPG
2018	San Antonio	1	0	3.0	.0	.0	.0	1.0	1.0	.0	.0	0.0
Career		1	0	3.0	.0	.0	.0	1.0	1.0	.0	.0	0.0
