= Reggie Bullock =

American basketball player (born 1991)

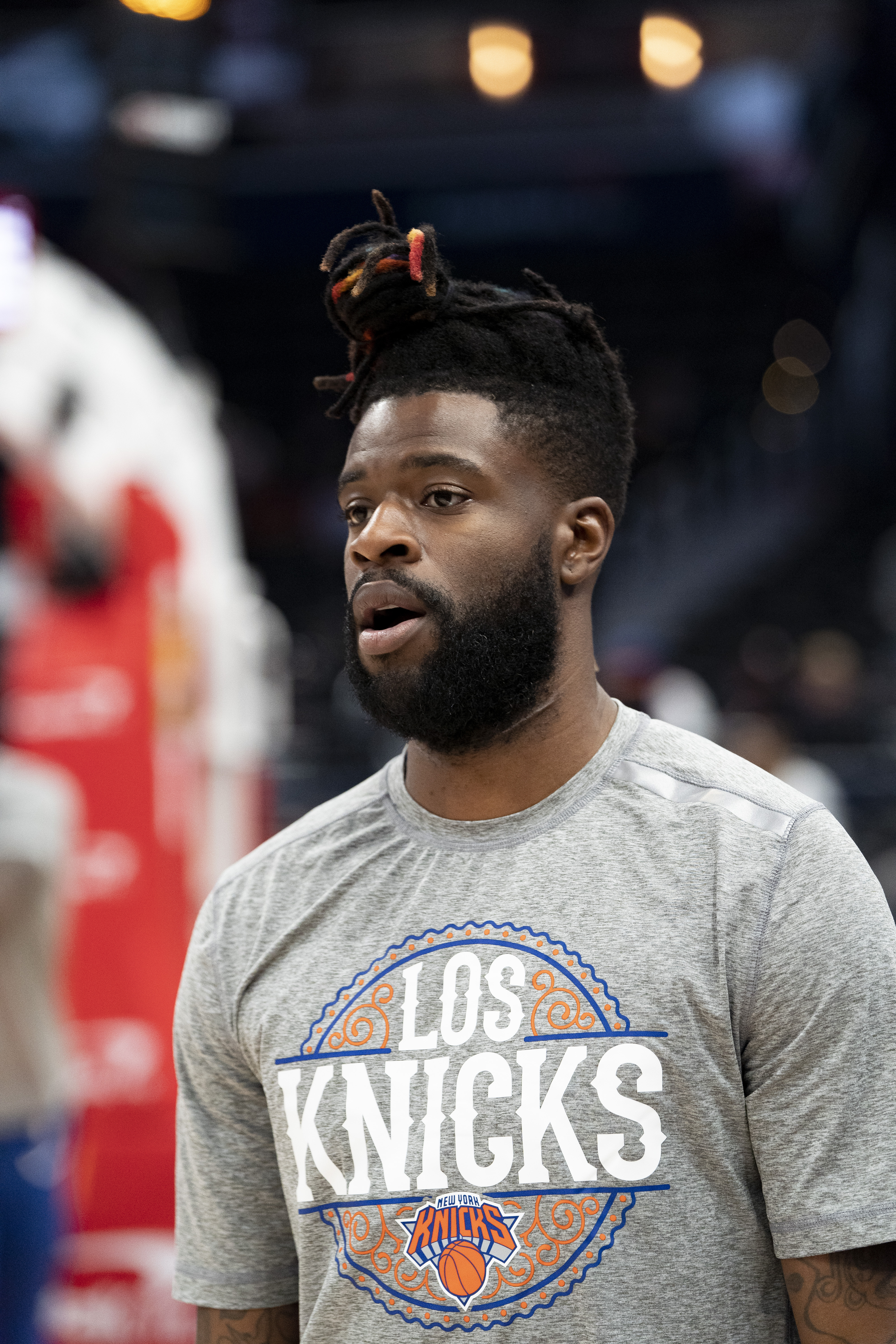
- Bullock with the New York Knicks in 2020

Personal information
- Born: March 16, 1991 (age 35) Baltimore, Maryland, U.S.
- Listed height: 6 ft 6 in (1.98 m)
- Listed weight: 205 lb (93 kg)

Career information
- High school: Kinston (Kinston, North Carolina)
- College: North Carolina (2010–2013)
- NBA draft: 2013: 1st round, 25th overall pick
- Drafted by: Los Angeles Clippers
- Playing career: 2013–2024
- Position: Small forward
- Number: 25, 35

Career history
- 2013–2015: Los Angeles Clippers
- 2015: Phoenix Suns
- 2015: →Bakersfield Jam
- 2015–2019: Detroit Pistons
- 2015: →Grand Rapids Drive
- 2019: Los Angeles Lakers
- 2019–2021: New York Knicks
- 2021–2023: Dallas Mavericks
- 2023–2024: Houston Rockets

Career highlights
- Second-team All-ACC (2013); McDonald's All-American (2010); First-team Parade All-American (2010); North Carolina Mr. Basketball (2010)
- Stats at NBA.com
- Stats at Basketball Reference

Reginald Ryedell Bullock Jr. (/bʊˈlɒk/ buul-OCK; born March 16, 1991) is an American former professional basketball player, who played for eleven seasons in the National Basketball Association (NBA). He played college basketball for the North Carolina Tar Heels before being selected by the Los Angeles Clippers in the first round of the 2013 NBA draft with the 25th overall pick. Bullock has also played for the Phoenix Suns, Detroit Pistons, Los Angeles Lakers, New York Knicks, Dallas Mavericks, and Houston Rockets.

== High school career ==
Bullock led his high school basketball team, the Kinston High Vikings, to three state championship games during his high school career, winning two championship titles. In 2008, they won the 3A title and in 2010 won the 2A title. During the 2010 championship game against West Caldwell, he was named Most Valuable Player and scored a team high of 15 points. He averaged 25 points and 11 rebounds per game for the 2009–2010 season to make the AP All-State men's team for a third straight season.

He was chosen to play in the 2010 McDonald's All-American game, where he was on the East Team along with Tobias Harris, Kendall Marshall, Kyrie Irving, and Jared Sullinger. Bullock also played in the Nike Hoops Summit game, the Spalding Hoophall Classic, the Jordan Brand Classic, the King James Classic, and the City of Palms Classic.

Bullock played on the CP3 Allstars in the AAU circuit. The team won the Gold Bracket Championships, were champions of Southern Jam Fest, runners up at Gibbons TOC, and in the Final Four at the Knoxvegas Heat.

== College career ==
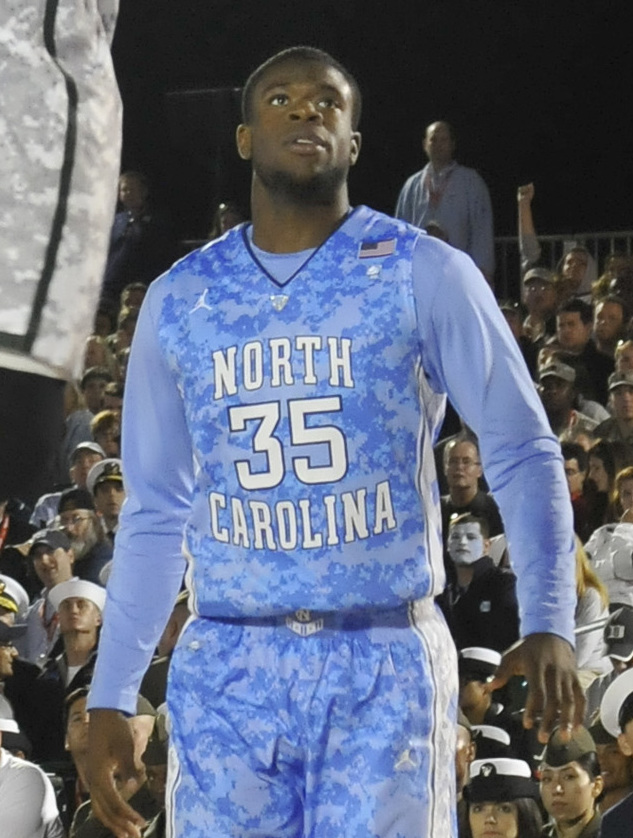
Bullock with the North Carolina Tar Heels during the 2011 Carrier Classic

Bullock committed to attending the University of North Carolina at Chapel Hill in January 2008, shortly after receiving a scholarship offer from the Tar Heels. He also received offers from Maryland, Ohio State, Wake Forest, and Indiana.

In Bullock's freshman season in 2010–11, he was sixth on the team in scoring and the second-leading scorer off the bench at 6.1 points per game. On February 27, 2011, he tore the lateral meniscus in his left knee in a win over Maryland. He had surgery on March 7 to repair the injury and missed the rest of the 2010–11 season.

In his sophomore season in 2011–12, he led UNC in three-pointers made with 71 and three-point percentage at 38.2%. With 8.8 points per game, he was the fourth-leading scorer on the team.

In his junior season in 2012–13, he was UNC's third-leading scorer at a career-best 13.9 per game. He was also second on the team in three-pointers, rebounds (6.5) and third in scoring, assists (101) and steals (44).

Over 100 career games, Bullock averaged 9.9 points, 5.0 rebounds, 1.7 assists in 24.6 minutes per game.

== Professional career ==
=== Los Angeles Clippers (2013–2015) ===
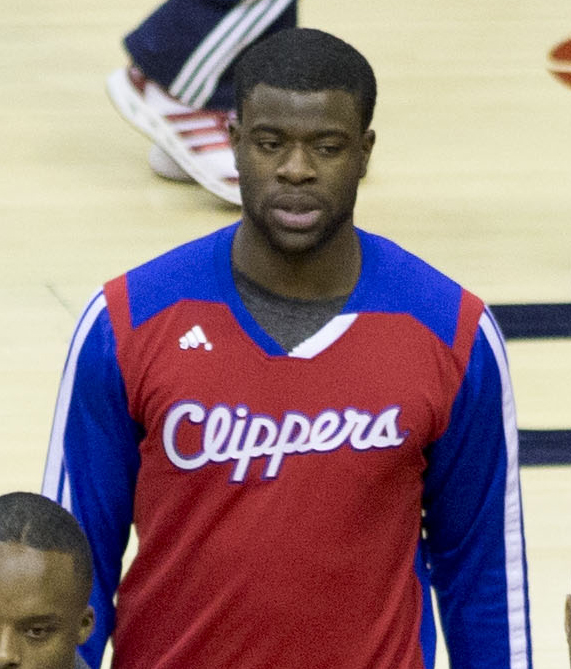
Bullock with the Los Angeles Clippers in 2013

Bullock was selected by the Los Angeles Clippers with the 25th overall pick in the 2013 NBA draft. On July 11, 2013, he signed his first professional contract with the Clippers. He then joined the Clippers for the 2013 NBA Summer League. Bullock made his NBA debut on October 29, 2013, against the Los Angeles Lakers, scoring two points.

=== Phoenix Suns (2015) ===
On January 15, 2015, Bullock was traded to the Phoenix Suns in a three-team trade also involving the Boston Celtics. Ten days later, he made his debut for the Suns against his former team, the Clippers, in a 120–100 loss. On January 29, he was assigned to the Bakersfield Jam of the NBA Development League. Three days later, he was recalled by the Suns. On February 7, he was reassigned to the Jam. Four days later he was recalled. Bullock went on to score his first basket for the Suns in a 110–96 victory over the Denver Nuggets on February 25, 2015.

=== Detroit Pistons (2015–2019) ===
On July 9, 2015, Bullock was traded to the Detroit Pistons, along with Danny Granger and Marcus Morris, in exchange for a 2020 second-round draft pick. On October 25, 2015, the Pistons exercised their fourth-year team option on Bullock's rookie scale contract, extending the contract through the 2016–17 season. On December 19, he was assigned to the Grand Rapids Drive, the Pistons' D-League affiliate. He was recalled by the Pistons the next day.

After hip and back issues delayed his 2016–17 season debut, Bullock appeared in just four games before being sidelined with another injury on November 25, 2016, having suffered a left knee meniscus tear against the Miami Heat two days earlier. On November 30, was ruled out for two to four months after requiring surgery to address the left meniscus tear.

On July 14, 2017, Bullock re-signed with the Pistons. On December 17, 2017, he scored a career-high 20 points in a 114–110 win over the Orlando Magic. On December 30, 2017, he set a new career high with 22 points in a 93–79 win over the San Antonio Spurs.

On November 11, 2018, Bullock had a career-high 23 points with six 3-pointers in a 113–103 loss to the Charlotte Hornets. He set a new career high with 24 points on December 17 against the Milwaukee Bucks, before surpassing that mark on December 19 with 33 points against the Minnesota Timberwolves.

=== Los Angeles Lakers (2019) ===
On February 6, 2019, Bullock was traded to the Los Angeles Lakers in exchange for Sviatoslav Mykhailiuk and a future second round draft pick.

=== New York Knicks (2019–2021) ===
On July 16, 2019, Bullock signed with the New York Knicks, and underwent successful surgery on the next day for a cervical disc herniation. In his debut with the Knicks on January 1, 2020, Bullock scored 11 points in a 117–93 win against the Portland Trail Blazers.

=== Dallas Mavericks (2021–2023) ===
On August 6, 2021, Bullock signed with the Dallas Mavericks. He made his debut on October 21, 2021, in a 87–113 loss to the Atlanta Hawks, scoring three points.

On July 12, 2023, Bullock was traded to the San Antonio Spurs as part of a three-team trade that sent Grant Williams to the Mavericks. However, he was waived by the Spurs on September 30.

=== Houston Rockets (2023–2024) ===
On October 4, 2023, Bullock signed with the Houston Rockets.

== Career statistics ==
Legend
GP	Games played	GS	Games started	MPG	Minutes per game
FG%	Field goal percentage	3P%	3-point field goal percentage	FT%	Free throw percentage
RPG	Rebounds per game	APG	Assists per game	SPG	Steals per game
BPG	Blocks per game	PPG	Points per game	**Bold**	Career high

=== NBA ===
==== Regular season ====
Year	Team	GP	GS	MPG	FG%	3P%	FT%	RPG	APG	SPG	BPG	PPG
2013–14	L.A. Clippers	43	0	9.2	.355	.301	.778	1.3	.3	.2	.0	2.7
2014–15	L.A. Clippers	25	2	10.5	.426	.385	.800	1.6	.2	.4	.1	2.6
2014–15	Phoenix	11	0	6.8	.063	.000	.500	.9	.2	.1	.2	.4
2015–16	Detroit	37	0	11.6	.439	.415	.933	1.8	.7	.3	.1	3.3
2016–17	Detroit	31	5	15.1	.422	.384	.714	2.1	.9	.6	.1	4.5
2017–18	Detroit	62	52	27.9	**.489**	**.445**	.796	2.5	1.5	.8	.2	11.3
2018–19	Detroit	44	44	**30.8**	.413	.388	.875	2.8	**2.5**	.5	.1	**12.1**
2018–19	L.A. Lakers	19	16	27.6	.412	.343	.810	2.6	1.1	.8	**.4**	9.3
2019–20	New York	29	19	23.6	.402	.333	.810	2.3	1.4	**.9**	.1	8.1
2020–21	New York	65	**64**	30.0	.442	.410	.909	3.4	1.5	.8	.2	10.9
2021–22	Dallas	68	37	28.0	.401	.360	.833	3.5	1.2	.6	.2	8.6
2022–23	Dallas	**78**	55	30.3	.409	.380	.703	**3.6**	1.4	.7	.2	7.2
2023–24	Houston	44	0	9.5	.415	.403	**1.000**	1.7	.3	.3	.1	2.2
Career		556	294	22.6	.424	.385	.827	2.6	1.2	.6	.1	7.3

==== Playoffs ====
Year	Team	GP	GS	MPG	FG%	3P%	FT%	RPG	APG	SPG	BPG	PPG
2014	L.A. Clippers	2	0	2.5	**1.000**	.000	.000	.0	.5	.0	.0	1.0
2016	Detroit	2	0	11.0	.833	**.667**	.000	1.0	1.5	.5	.0	6.0
2021	New York	5	5	32.4	.385	.345	.800	3.4	1.2	.6	**.2**	8.8
2022	Dallas	**18**	**18**	**39.3**	.404	.397	**.889**	**4.6**	**1.7**	**1.2**	.1	**10.6**
Career		27	23	33.2	.416	.393	.870	3.7	1.5	1.0	.1	9.2

=== College ===
Year	Team	GP	GS	MPG	FG%	3P%	FT%	RPG	APG	SPG	BPG	PPG
2010–11	North Carolina	27	0	14.5	.367	.296	.565	2.8	.6	.7	.1	6.1
2011–12	North Carolina	**38**	18	25.4	.428	.382	.727	5.1	1.4	.7	.2	8.8
2012–13	North Carolina	35	**35**	**31.4**	**.483**	**.436**	**.767**	**6.5**	**2.9**	**1.3**	**.3**	**13.9**
Career		100	53	24.6	.439	.387	.720	5.0	1.7	.9	.2	9.9

== Awards ==
- 2010 McDonald's All-American Team Selection
- 2010 North Carolina Gatorade Player of the Year
- 2009–2010 Associated Press Men's Prep Basketball Player of the Year
- 2010 Jordan Brand Classic Team Selection
- Kareem Abdul-Jabbar Social Justice Champion (2021–22)

== Personal life ==
Bullock has a son. Bullock's transgender sister, Mia Henderson, was murdered in Baltimore on July 16, 2014. A suspect was arrested in August 2015. In August 2016, Bullock said of his sister, "She lived as herself, she taught me how to be (myself). She taught me how to take care of the family... She was happy with being who she was. She wasn't worried about how others felt about her. A person that can isolate the whole world out and not care about other people's feelings is a strong person, to me. That was one of the biggest things that I got from her." Bullock remains engaged in LGBTQ rights, volunteering to train gay and transgender youth alongside Jason Collins, a basketball player who came out as gay in a 2013 edition of Sports Illustrated. Bullock has also taken part with his young son Treyson in the New York City LGBT Pride March as part of the LGBT NBA float. He was honored during the GLAAD Media Awards, and is active in the charity "NBA Voices for LGBT Youth and Allies". He also appears in documentary from Vice Sports where he talks about his sister and his engagement towards the gay community in her memory. He is also involved in anti-bullying campaigns.

On October 29, 2019, Keiosha Moore, Bullock's other sister, was murdered in Baltimore.
