= 2011–12 Michigan State Spartans men's basketball team =

American college basketball season

2011–12 Michigan State Spartans men's basketball

Big Ten regular season co-champions Big Ten tournament champions

NCAA tournament, Sweet Sixteen
- Conference: Big Ten Conference

Ranking
- Coaches: No. 7
- AP: No. 5
- Record: 29–8 (13–5 Big Ten)
- Head coach: Tom Izzo (17th season)
- Assistant coaches: Dwayne Stephens (9th season); Mike Garland (5th season); Dane Fife (1st season)
- Captains: Draymond Green; Austin Thornton
- Home arena: Breslin Center

2011–12 Big Ten Conference men's basketball standings
| | Conf. | | | | Overall |
| Team | W | | L | PCT | W | | L | PCT |
|---|---|---|---|---|---|---|---|---|
| No. 5 Michigan State† | 13 | – | 5 | .722 | 29 | – | 8 | .784 |
| No. 13 Michigan | 13 | – | 5 | .722 | 24 | – | 10 | .706 |
| No. 7 Ohio State | 13 | – | 5 | .722 | 31 | – | 8 | .795 |
| No. 14 Wisconsin | 12 | – | 6 | .667 | 26 | – | 10 | .722 |
| No. 16 Indiana | 11 | – | 7 | .611 | 27 | – | 9 | .750 |
| Purdue | 10 | – | 8 | .556 | 22 | – | 13 | .629 |
| Northwestern | 8 | – | 10 | .444 | 19 | – | 14 | .576 |
| Iowa | 8 | – | 10 | .444 | 18 | – | 17 | .514 |
| Illinois | 6 | – | 12 | .333 | 17 | – | 15 | .531 |
| Minnesota | 6 | – | 12 | .333 | 23 | – | 15 | .605 |
| Nebraska | 4 | – | 14 | .222 | 12 | – | 18 | .400 |
| Penn State | 4 | – | 14 | .222 | 12 | – | 20 | .375 |
† 2012 Big Ten tournament winner Rankings from AP poll

The 2011–12 Michigan State Spartans men's basketball team represented Michigan State University in the 2011–12 NCAA Division I men's basketball season. The Spartans' head coach was Tom Izzo, who was in his 17th year at Michigan State. The team played its home games at the Breslin Center in East Lansing, Michigan, and were members of the Big Ten Conference. MSU finished with a record of 29–8, 13–5 in Big Ten play to finish in a three-way tie for first place. The Spartans also won the Big Ten tournament. The Spartans received a No. 1 seed in the NCAA tournament, their 15th consecutive trip to the tournament, and reached the Sweet Sixteen, losing to Louisville.

== Previous season ==
The Spartans finished the 2010–11 season with an overall record of 19–15, 9–9 in Big Ten play to finish in fourth place. Michigan State received a No. 10 seed in the NCAA tournament, their 14th straight trip to the tournament, and were eliminated in the second round.

== Offseason ==
The Spartans lost Durrell Summers (11.6 points and 4.2 rebounds per game) and Kalin Lucas (17.0 points and 3.4 assists per game) to graduation following the season.

=== 2011 recruiting class ===
College recruiting
| Name | Hometown | School | Height | Weight | Commit date |
|---|---|---|---|---|---|
| Brandan Kearney; No. 36 SG | Detroit, MI | Southeastern | 6 ft 5 in (1.96 m) | 175 lb (79 kg) | Nov 3, 2009 |
| Brandan Kearney; No. 36 SG | Recruit ratings: Scout: Rivals: (96) | | | | |
| Branden Dawson; No. 5 SF | Gary, IN | Lew Wallace High School | 6 ft 6 in (1.98 m) | 200 lb (91 kg) | Aug 4, 2010 |
| Branden Dawson; No. 5 SF | Recruit ratings: Scout: Rivals: (97) | | | | |
| Travis Trice; No. 37 PG | Huber Heights, OH | Wayne High School | 5 ft 11 in (1.80 m) | 155 lb (70 kg) | Aug 4, 2010 |
| Travis Trice; No. 37 PG | Recruit ratings: Scout: Rivals: (92) | | | | |
Overall recruit ranking:
Note: In many cases, Scout, Rivals, 247Sports, On3, and ESPN may conflict in their listings of height and weight.; In these cases, the average was taken. ESPN grades are on a 100-point scale.; Sources: "Michigan State Commit List for 2011". Rivals.; "Men's Basketball Recruiting". Scout.; "ESPN – Michigan State Spartans Basketball Recruiting 2011". ESPN.; "Scout.com Team Recruiting Rankings". Scout.; "2011 Team Ranking". Rivals.

== Season summary ==
Senior Draymond Green (16.2 points, 10.6 rebounds, and 3.8 assists per game) was the unquestioned leader for the Spartans. MSU started the season unranked and suffered a loss to No. 1 North Carolina in the Carrier Classic which was played on the aircraft carrier USS Carl Vinson in San Diego in the first game of the season. The teams wore special camouflage uniforms for the event. MSU followed that loss with a loss to No. 6 Duke in the Champions Classic. Starting the season 0–2, the Spartans refused to fold. MSU won the next 15 games in a row to jump into the top ten in the polls. The wins in the streak included a win at No. 23 Gonzaga. The Spartans finished the non-conference schedule at 11–2 and ranked No. 16 in the country.

The winning streak continued in Big Ten play with wins over No. 13 Indiana, and at No. 11 Wisconsin. MSU also beat No. 23 Michigan, No. 3 Ohio State, and No. 15 Wisconsin at Breslin Center. A loss in the regular season finale at home to No. 10 Ohio State meant the Spartans would share the Big Ten regular season championship with Ohio State and Michigan, all of which finished the Big Ten season with a 13–5 conference record. In that loss to Ohio State, key freshman reserve, Branden Dawson, tore his ACL, ending his season. The Spartans finished the season ranked No. 8 in the country. The Spartans, due to tiebreak rules, were the No. 1 seed in the Big Ten tournament and beat Iowa, No. 14 Wisconsin, and No. 7 Ohio State to win the tournament championship. Draymond Green earned Big Ten Player of the Year honors, the fifth time a player had done so under Tom Izzo. Izzo was also named Big Ten Coach of the Year.

MSU received a No. 1 seed in the West Region of the NCAA Tournament, where they beat LIU–Brooklyn in the first round behind Green's triple-double. The Spartans overcame Saint Louis in the second round to advance to the Sweet Sixteen. This marked the 10th time in 15 seasons that the Spartans advanced to at least the Sweet Sixteen. The Spartans, missing Dawson and struggling offensively, became the first No. 1 seed to lose in the tournament, falling to No. 17 and fourth-seeded Louisville, 57–44.

== Roster ==
2011–12 Michigan State Spartans men's basketball team
Players
Coaches

| Pos. | # | Name | Height | Weight | Year | Previous school | Hometown |
|---|---|---|---|---|---|---|---|
| G | 11 | Keith Appling | 6 ft 1 in (1.85 m) | 190 lb (86 kg) | So | Pershing H.S. | Detroit, Michigan |
| F | 0 | Russell Byrd | 6 ft 7 in (2.01 m) | 205 lb (93 kg) | RS Fr | Blackhawk Christian H.S. | Fort Wayne, Indiana |
| G | 14 | Dan Chapman (W) | 6 ft 3 in (1.91 m) | 185 lb (84 kg) | So | Okemos H.S. | Okemos, Michigan |
| G | 22 | Branden Dawson | 6 ft 6 in (1.98 m) | 220 lb (100 kg) | Fr | Lew Wallace H.S | Gary, Indiana |
| F | 2 | Alex Gauna | 6 ft 9 in (2.06 m) | 240 lb (109 kg) | RS Fr | Eaton Rapids H.S. | Eaton Rapids, Michigan |
| F | 23 | Draymond Green (C) | 6 ft 7 in (2.01 m) | 230 lb (104 kg) | Sr | Saginaw H.S. | Saginaw, Michigan |
| C | 44 | Anthony Ianni | 6 ft 9 in (2.06 m) | 250 lb (113 kg) | RS Sr | Grand Valley State | East Lansing, Michigan |
| G | 3 | Brandan Kearney | 6 ft 5 in (1.96 m) | 185 lb (84 kg) | Fr | Southeastern H.S. | Detroit, Michigan |
| C | 25 | Derrick Nix | 6 ft 9 in (2.06 m) | 270 lb (122 kg) | Jr | Pershing H.S. | Detroit, Michigan |
| C | 5 | Adreian Payne | 6 ft 10 in (2.08 m) | 240 lb (109 kg) | So | Jefferson H.S. | Dayton, Ohio |
| G | 13 | Austin Thornton (C) | 6 ft 5 in (1.96 m) | 205 lb (93 kg) | RS Sr | Cedar Springs H.S. | Sand Lake, Michigan |
| G | 20 | Travis Trice | 6 ft 0 in (1.83 m) | 170 lb (77 kg) | Fr | Wayne H.S. | Huber Heights, Ohio |
| G | 15 | Keenan Wetzel (W) | 6 ft 4 in (1.93 m) | 190 lb (86 kg) | RS Fr | St. Mary Catholic Central | Monroe, Michigan |
| F | 40 | Colby Wollenman | 6 ft 6 in (1.98 m) | 220 lb (100 kg) | Fr | Big Horn H.S. | Big Horn, Wyoming |
| G | 30 | Brandon Wood | 6 ft 2 in (1.88 m) | 190 lb (86 kg) | RS Sr | Valparaiso | Kokomo, Indiana |

Head coach

- Tom Izzo (Northern Michigan)

Assistant coach(es)

- Dwayne Stephens (Michigan State)
- Dane Fife (Indiana)
- Mike Garland (Northern Michigan)

Legend

- (C) Team captain
- (S) Suspended
- (I) Ineligible
- (W) Walk-on
- Injured
- Current redshirt

Roster

== Schedule and results ==
| Date time, TV | Rank^{#} | Opponent^{#} | Result | Record | High points | High rebounds | High assists | Site (attendance) city, state |
Exhibition
| Oct 30, 2011*; 2:00 pm | | Ferris State | W 85–58 | | 15 – Dawson/Nix | 9 – Dawson | 8 – Green | Breslin Center (14,797); East Lansing, MI |
| Nov 4, 2011*; 7:00 pm | | Hillsdale | W 80–58 | | 15 – Green | 10 – Payne | 6 – Trice | Breslin Center (14,797); East Lansing, MI |
Non-conference regular season
| Nov 11, 2011*; 7:00 pm, ESPN | | vs. No. 1 North Carolina; Carrier Classic | L 55–67 | 0–1 | 13 – Green | 11 – Green | 3 – Trice | USS Carl Vinson (8,111); San Diego, CA |
| Nov 15, 2011*; 7:00 pm, ESPN | | vs. No. 6 Duke; Champions Classic | L 69–74 | 0–2 | 22 – Appling | 9 – Payne | 3 – Dawson | Madison Square Garden (19,979); New York, NY |
| Nov 18, 2011*; 6:30 pm | | Texas Southern; Auto-Owners Insurance Spartan Invitational | W 76–41 | 1–2 | 13 – Dawson | 10 – Green | 6 – Green | Breslin Center (14,797); East Lansing, MI |
| Nov 20, 2011*; 6:00 pm, BTN | | Arkansas–Little Rock; Auto-Owners Insurance Spartan Invitational | W 69–47 | 2–2 | 13 – Thornton | 9 – Green | 4 – Green | Breslin Center (14,797); East Lansing, MI |
| Nov 23, 2011*; 7:00 pm | | Milwaukee; Auto-Owners Insurance Spartan Invitational | W 68–55 | 3–2 | 18 – Green | 7 – Green | 4 – Wood | Breslin Center (14,797); East Lansing, MI |
| Nov 27, 2011*; 12:00 pm, ESPNU | | at Eastern Michigan | W 72–40 | 4–2 | 14 – Green | 13 – Green | 5 – Appling | Convocation Center (3,711); Ypsilanti, MI |
| Nov 30, 2011*; 7:30 pm, ESPN | | Florida State; ACC – Big Ten Challenge | W 65–49 | 5–2 | 24 – Appling | 10 – Wood | 5 – Wood | Breslin Center (14,797); East Lansing, MI |
| Dec 4, 2011*; 2:00 pm | | Nebraska–Omaha | W 110–68 | 6–2 | 23 – Green | 10 – Green | 7 – Appling | Breslin Center (14,797); East Lansing, MI |
| Dec 7, 2011*; 7:00 pm | | Central Connecticut | W 89–69 | 7–2 | 20 – Trice | 11 – Dawson | 4 – Green/Thornton | Breslin Center (14,797); East Lansing, MI |
| Dec 10, 2011*; 9:00 pm, ESPNU | | at No. 23 Gonzaga | W 74–67 | 8–2 | 34 – Green | 6 – Nix | 7 – Appling | McCarthey Athletic Center (6,000); Spokane, WA |
| Dec 17, 2011*; 7:00 pm, BTN | No. 21 | Bowling Green | W 74–60 | 9–2 | 16 – Wood | 10 – Green | 6 – Green | Breslin Center (14,797); East Lansing, MI |
| Dec 19, 2011*; 8:30 pm, BTN | No. 19 | UMKC | W 89–54 | 10–2 | 16 – Dawson/Wood | 11 – Green | 8 – Appling | Breslin Center (14,797); East Lansing, MI |
| Dec 22, 2011*; 9:00 pm, ESPNU | No. 19 | Lehigh | W 90–81 | 11–2 | 19 – Appling | 10 – Green | 5 – trice | Breslin Center (14,797); East Lansing, MI |
Big Ten regular season
| Dec 28, 2011; 7:30 pm, BTN | No. 16 | No. 13 Indiana | W 80–65 | 12–2 (1–0) | 25 – Appling | 7 – Green | 7 – Appling | Breslin Center (14,797); East Lansing, MI |
| Dec 31, 2011; 3:00 pm, BTN | No. 16 | at Nebraska | W 68–55 | 13–2 (2–0) | 19 – Green | 8 – Green | 4 – Appling | Bob Devaney Sports Center (13,595); Lincoln, NE |
| Jan 3, 2012; 7:00 pm, ESPN2 | No. 10 | at No. 18 Wisconsin | W 63–60 ^{OT} | 14–2 (3–0) | 18 – Green | 14 – Green | 4 – Wood | Kohl Center (17,230); Madison, WI |
| Jan 10, 2012; 7:00 pm, BTN | No. 6 | Iowa | W 95–61 | 15–2 (4–0) | 22 – Green | 10 – Green | 9 – Appling | Breslin Center (14,797); East Lansing, MI |
| Jan 14, 2012; 3:00 pm, BTN | No. 6 | at Northwestern | L 74–81 | 15–3 (4–1) | 17 – Appling | 14 – Green | 5 – wood | Welsh-Ryan Arena (8,117); Evanston, IL |
| Jan 17, 2012; 7:00 pm, ESPN | No. 9 | at No. 19 Michigan rivalry | L 59–60 | 15–4 (4–2) | 13 – Nix | 11 – Gren | 5 – Appling | Crisler Center (12,721); Ann Arbor, MI |
| Jan 21, 2012; 12:00 pm, ESPN | No. 9 | Purdue | W 83–58 | 16–4 (5–2) | 14 – Dawson | 12 – Green | 7 – Green | Breslin Center (14,797); East Lansing, MI |
| Jan 25, 2012; 8:30 pm, BTN | No. 10 | Minnesota | W 68–52 | 17–4 (6–2) | 22 – Green | 14 – Green | 6 – Green | Breslin Center (14,797); East Lansing, MI |
| Jan 31, 2012; 7:00 pm, ESPN | No. 9 | at Illinois | L 41–42 | 17–5 (6–3) | 12 – Dawson | 13 – Dawson | 2 – Appling | Assembly Hall (15,629); Champaign, IL |
| Feb 5, 2012; 1:00 pm, CBS | No. 9 | No. 23 Michigan rivalry | W 64–54 | 18–5 (7–3) | 14 – Green | 16 – Green | 4 – Green/Thornton/Wood | Breslin Center (14,797); East Lansing, MI |
| Feb 8, 2012; 9:00 pm, BTN | No. 11 | Penn State | W 77–57 | 19–5 (8–3) | 23 – Green | 12 – Green | 7 – appling | Breslin Center (14,797); East Lansing, MI |
| Feb 11, 2012; 6:00 pm, ESPN | No. 11 | at No. 3 Ohio State | W 58–48 | 20–5 (9–3) | 15 – Payne | 9 – Green | 2 – Green/Nix/Trice | Value City Arena (18,809); Columbus, OH |
| Feb 16, 2012; 7:00 pm, ESPN | No. 7 | No. 15 Wisconsin | W 69–55 | 21–5 (10–3) | 20 – Appling/Green | 10 – Green | 5 – Green | Breslin Center (14,797); East Lansing, MI |
| Feb 19, 2012; 1:00 pm, CBS | No. 7 | at Purdue | W 76–62 | 22–5 (11–3) | 20 – Green | 11 – Dawson | 7 – Green | Mackey Arena (15,025); West Lafayette, IN |
| Feb 22, 2012; 8:30 pm, BTN | No. 6 | at Minnesota | W 66–61 | 23–5 (12–3) | 17 – Green | 5 – Green/Payne | 5 – Appling/Green | Williams Arena (13,331); Minneapolis, MN |
| Feb 25, 2012; 8:00 pm, BTN | No. 6 | Nebraska | W 62–34 | 24–5 (13–3) | 20 – Green | 10 – Green | 5 – Nix | Breslin Center (14,797); East Lansing, MI |
| Feb 28, 2012; 7:00 pm, ESPN | No. 5 | at No. 18 Indiana | L 55–70 | 24–6 (13–4) | 29 – Green | 8 – Green | 5 – Appling | Assembly Hall (17,280); Bloomington, IN |
| Mar 4, 2012; 4:00 pm, CBS | No. 5 | No. 10 Ohio State | L 70–72 | 24–7 (13–5) | 19 – Green | 12 – Green | 3 – Appling/Green/Thornton | Breslin Center (14,797); East Lansing, MI |
Big Ten tournament
| Mar 9, 2012; 12:00 pm, ESPN | (1) No. 8 | vs. (8) Iowa quarterfinals | W 92–75 | 25–7 | 21 – Green | 10 – Green | 6 – Appling | Bankers Life Fieldhouse (18,484); Indianapolis, IN |
| Mar 10, 2012; 1:40 pm, CBS | (1) No. 8 | vs. (4) No. 14 Wisconsin semifinals | W 65–52 | 26–7 | 14 – Green | 16 – Green | 5 – Appling/Green | Bankers Life Fieldhouse (18,451); Indianapolis, IN |
| Mar 11, 2012; 3:30 pm, CBS | (1) No. 8 | vs. (3) No. 7 Ohio State championship | W 68–64 | 27–7 | 21 – Wood | 9 – Green | 5 – Appling | Bankers Life Fieldhouse (17,125); Indianapolis, IN |
NCAA tournament
| Mar 16, 2012*; 9:20 pm, TBS | (1 W) No. 5 | vs. (16 W) Long Island second round | W 89–67 | 28–7 | 24 – Green | 12 – Green | 10 – Green | Nationwide Arena (17,464); Columbus, OH |
| Mar 18, 2012*; 2:45 pm, CBS | (1 W) No. 5 | vs. (9 W) Saint Louis third round | W 65–61 | 29–7 | 19 – Appling | 13 – Green | 6 – Green | Nationwide Arena (17,425); Columbus, OH |
| Mar 22, 2012*; 7:47 pm, TBS | (1 W) No. 5 | vs. (4 W) No. 17 Louisville; Sweet Sixteen | L 44–57 | 29–8 | 14 – Wood | 16 – Green | 4 – Appling | US Airways Center (14,913); Phoenix, AZ |
*Non-conference game. ^{#}Rankings from AP Poll. (#) Tournament seedings in parentheses. All times are in Eastern Time; Source.

== Player statistics ==
Individual player statistics (Final)
| | | Minutes | | Scoring | | Total FGs | | | 3-point FGs | | | Free-Throws | | | Rebounds | | | | | | | |
| Player | GP | Tot | Avg | Pts | Avg | FG | FGA | Pct | 3FG | 3FA | Pct | FT | FTA | Pct | Off | Def | Tot | Avg | A | Stl | Blk | Tov |
|---|---|---|---|---|---|---|---|---|---|---|---|---|---|---|---|---|---|---|---|---|---|---|
| Appling, Keith | 37 | 1139 | 30.8 | 420 | 11.4 | 131 | 307 | .427 | 24 | 96 | .250 | 134 | 170 | .788 | 17 | 89 | 106 | 2.9 | 144 | 43 | 15 | 85 |
| Byrd, Russell | 27 | 149 | 5.5 | 41 | 1.5 | 12 | 43 | .279 | 9 | 33 | .273 | 8 | 10 | .800 | 8 | 8 | 16 | 0.6 | 11 | 5 | 3 | 9 |
| Chapman, Dan | 15 | 17 | 1.1 | 0 | 0.0 | 0 | 5 | .000 | 0 | 2 | .000 | 0 | 0 | | 1 | 5 | 6 | 0.4 | 1 | 0 | 0 | 0 |
| Dawson, Branden | 31 | 640 | 20.6 | 259 | 8.4 | 109 | 189 | .577 | 0 | 3 | .000 | 41 | 69 | .594 | 67 | 72 | 139 | 4.5 | 29 | 29 | 26 | 43 |
| Gauna, Alex | 30 | 142 | 4.7 | 55 | 1.8 | 22 | 38 | .579 | 0 | 0 | | 11 | 21 | .524 | 11 | 13 | 24 | 0.8 | 0 | 1 | 3 | 13 |
| Green, Draymond | 37 | 1229 | 33.2 | 601 | 16.2 | 212 | 472 | .449 | 52 | 134 | .388 | 125 | 173 | .723 | 79 | 315 | 394 | 10.6 | 141 | 54 | 35 | 112 |
| Ianni, Anthony | 21 | 35 | 1.7 | 3 | 0.1 | 1 | 3 | .333 | 0 | 0 | | 1 | 2 | .500 | 2 | 5 | 7 | 0.3 | 2 | 1 | 1 | 2 |
| Kearney, Brandon | 34 | 326 | 9.6 | 41 | 1.2 | 17 | 36 | .472 | 5 | 13 | .385 | 2 | 7 | .286 | 9 | 19 | 28 | 0.8 | 19 | 8 | 6 | 11 |
| Nix, Derrick | 37 | 700 | 18.9 | 301 | 8.1 | 129 | 231 | .558 | 0 | 0 | | 43 | 74 | .581 | 59 | 80 | 139 | 3.8 | 38 | 27 | 13 | 50 |
| Payne, Adreian | 37 | 661 | 17.9 | 259 | 7.0 | 98 | 173 | .566 | 1 | 2 | .500 | 62 | 89 | .697 | 57 | 100 | 157 | 4.2 | 12 | 25 | 39 | 39 |
| Sweeny, Joe | 10 | 11 | 1.1 | 2 | 0.2 | 0 | 2 | .000 | 0 | 1 | .000 | 2 | 2 | 1.000 | 0 | 1 | 1 | 0.1 | 1 | 1 | 0 | 3 |
| Thornton, Austin | 37 | 808 | 21.8 | 193 | 5.2 | 54 | 114 | .474 | 31 | 65 | .477 | 54 | 62 | .871 | 33 | 90 | 123 | 3.3 | 42 | 23 | 6 | 27 |
| Trice, Travis | 32 | 551 | 17.2 | 145 | 4.5 | 48 | 126 | .381 | 30 | 74 | .405 | 19 | 33 | .576 | 5 | 52 | 57 | 1.8 | 56 | 25 | 2 | 37 |
| Wetzel, Keenan | 11 | 12 | 1.1 | 4 | 0.4 | 1 | 2 | .500 | 1 | 2 | .500 | 1 | 2 | .500 | 0 | 0 | 0 | 0.0 | 0 | 0 | 0 | 1 |
| Wollenman, Colby | 9 | 10 | 1.1 | 2 | 0.2 | 1 | 2 | .500 | 0 | 0 | | 0 | 0 | | 0 | 1 | 1 | 0.1 | 0 | 0 | 0 | 2 |
| Wood, Brandon | 37 | 994 | 26.9 | 325 | 8.8 | 125 | 269 | .465 | 47 | 130 | .362 | 28 | 45 | .622 | 32 | 72 | 104 | 2.8 | 70 | 23 | 8 | 37 |

Legend
| GP | Games played | Avg | Average per game |
| FG | Field-goals made | FGA | Field-goal attempts | Off | Offensive rebounds |
| Def | Defensive rebounds | A | Assists | TO | Turnovers |
| Blk | Blocks | Stl | Steals |

== Rankings ==
Ranking movements Legend: ██ Increase in ranking ██ Decrease in ranking RV = Received votes
| | Week | | | | | | | | | | | | | | | | | | | |
| Poll | Pre | 1 | 2 | 3 | 4 | 5 | 6 | 7 | 8 | 9 | 10 | 11 | 12 | 13 | 14 | 15 | 16 | 17 | 18 | Final |
|---|---|---|---|---|---|---|---|---|---|---|---|---|---|---|---|---|---|---|---|---|
| AP | RV | RV | RV | RV | RV | 21 | 19 | 16 | 10 | 6 | 9 | 10 | 9 | 11 | 7 | 6 | 5 | 8 | 5 | Not released |
| Coaches | RV | RV | RV | RV | RV | 23 | 20 | 17 | 11 | 7 | 9 | 11 | 10 | 12 | 7 | 6 | 5 | 8 | 4 | 7 |

*AP does not release post-NCAA tournament rankings

== Awards and honors ==
=== Draymond Green ===
- Big Ten Player of the Year
- AP All-American (unanimous)
- Sporting News All-American First Team
- USBWA All-American
- NABC All-American First Team
- NABC Player of the Year
- USBWA District V Player of the Year
- Big Ten All Defensive Team
- NABC All-District First Team

=== Tom Izzo ===
- Big Ten Coach of the Year
- USBWA District V Coach of the Year
- NABC Division I Coach of the Year

=== Branden Dawson ===
- All Big Ten Honorable Mention (Media)
- Big Ten All-Freshman Team

=== Keith Appling ===
- All Big Ten Third Team
