= 2014–15 Phoenix Suns season =

Professional basketball season

- Head coach: Jeff Hornacek
- General manager: Ryan McDonough
- Owners: Robert Sarver
- Arena: US Airways Center

Results
- Record: 39–43 (.476)
- Place: Division: 3rd (Pacific); Conference: 10th (Western)
- Playoff finish: Did not qualify
- Stats at Basketball Reference

Local media
- Television: Fox Sports Arizona
- Radio: KTAR

The 2014–15 Phoenix Suns season was the 47th season of the franchise in the NBA. It was also the last season that the arena was called the US Airways Center, before it was renamed Talking Stick Resort Arena beginning in October 2015. With Channing Frye and Leandro Barbosa leaving in free agency and Goran Dragić being traded to the Miami Heat near the end of the trade deadline, no other player on the team had made the playoffs with the organization in previous years now. The Suns were in playoff contention for much of the season but suffered in the final weeks, partly due to injuries involving Brandon Knight and later Alex Len, and partly due to the number of players added and taken away during the trade deadline. The Suns capped off the 2014–15 NBA season with five consecutive losses and losing 10 out of 11 games total (the worst season-ending stretch since its inaugural season), finishing third place in Pacific division and tenth place in Western Conference with a 39–43 record. The Suns did not qualify for the playoffs for the fifth straight year, which tied the stretch from the 1970–71 to 1974–75 seasons as the team's longest playoff drought.

What marked this season in particular were the trades the Suns made. In the offseason, the Suns traded for point guard Isaiah Thomas for 2013 second-round pick Alex Oriakhi. Thomas was later traded in an infamously massive multi-team trade that also resulted in the Dragić brothers, rookie guard Tyler Ennis, and center Miles Plumlee going to some different teams in exchange for guard Brandon Knight from the Milwaukee Bucks, Marcus Thornton from the Boston Celtics, Danny Granger from the Miami Heat, and three different future first-round picks (all of which were later used in different trades in future seasons). Before then, the Suns tried to remain competitive with smaller trades like trading Anthony Tolliver to the Detroit Pistons for Tony Mitchell (who was eventually waived), trading a future Minnesota Timberwolves first-round pick (that was ultimately conveyed into two second-round selections) to Boston for center Brandan Wright, and being involved in a three-way trade with the Celtics and Los Angeles Clippers that gave them Reggie Bullock for Shavlik Randolph.

== Key dates ==
- May 20, 2014: The NBA Draft Lottery takes place.
- June 26, 2014: The 2014 NBA draft takes place at the Barclays Center in Brooklyn, New York.
- July 1, 2014: The NBA free agency period begins.
- July 7, 2014: Channing Frye agrees to a 4-year, $32 million contract to play for the Orlando Magic, which signifies the completion of dismembering the last Suns playoff roster between 2010 and now (although Goran Dragić returned in 2012 after being traded a year earlier).
- July 10, 2014: Teams can sign, trade, and amnesty players; P. J. Tucker agrees to a 3-year, $17.5 million contract to stay with the Suns.
- July 11, 2014: The Suns complete a sign-and-trade, sending Alex Oriakhi and a $7 million trade exception to the Sacramento Kings in exchange for point guard Isaiah Thomas, who agrees to a 4-year, $27 million contract.
- July 15, 2014: The Suns waive Ishmael "Ish" Smith's contract before it became guaranteed for the rest of the season.
- July 16, 2014: Anthony Tolliver signs a 2-year, $6 million contract to play with the Suns.
- July 28, 2014: P. J. Tucker is arrested for "super-extreme DUI."
- August 8, 2014: Both first rounders T. J. Warren and Tyler Ennis sign.
- August 12, 2014: The NBA suspend P. J. Tucker was suspended for the first three games of the regular season.
- August 13, 2014: The NBA accidentally leaks out that the Suns' Martin Luther King, Jr. Day game was to be played at home against the Los Angeles Lakers on TNT before the schedule is announced. After starting last season with only one ESPN game (with three more added during the regular season), the Suns get 17 nationally televised games, including 4 on ESPN and 6 on TNT (including a home game against the Oklahoma City Thunder and the regular season finale against the Los Angeles Clippers).
- September 24, 2014: After months of inactivity, Eric Bledsoe agrees to a 5-year, $70 million contract.
- September 25, 2014: The Suns partially buys out the contract of Zoran Dragić, Goran's brother, in order to sign him on a 2-year contract worth $4,012,500.
- September 29, 2014: Media Day and training camp begins for the Suns; twin brothers Markieff and Marcus Morris receive 4-year contract extensions worth $32 million and $20 million, respectively.
- October 29, 2014: The Suns play their first regular season game.
- November 4, 2014: P. J. Tucker completes his three-game suspension.
- November 19, 2014: The Suns played the Detroit Pistons at The Palace of Auburn Hills on the tenth anniversary of Malice at the Palace, winning 88–86.
- December 2, 2014: The Suns announce the new name of the U.S. Airways Center, Talking Stick Resort Arena, which takes effect after the season.
- December 24, 2014: The Suns trade Anthony Tolliver to the Detroit Pistons in exchange for power forward Tony Mitchell, who used to play basketball for North Texas University.
- December 28, 2014: Following a six-game losing streak, the Suns start December with a six-game winning streak with wins over the Charlotte Hornets, New York Knicks, Washington Wizards, Dallas Mavericks, Sacramento Kings, and Los Angeles Lakers, with all but the Dallas game on the road.
- January 9, 2015: Prior to the Suns' close road loss against the rival San Antonio Spurs, the Suns traded with general manager Ryan McDonough's former team, the Boston Celtics, to grab the rights of power forward/center Brandan Wright in exchange for the Minnesota Timberwolves' top 12 protected first-round pick the Suns first got from their Robin Lopez and Hakim Warrick for Wesley Johnson trade, which would be conveyed to two second-round picks in 2016 and 2017 if the conditions aren't met by the end of the 2015–16 NBA season. The Suns also waived Tony Mitchell's rights in the process.
- January 13, 2015: When the Suns had their 107–100 victory over the Cleveland Cavaliers, the Suns began their eight-game homestand for January, which marked the longest homestand in franchise history. This game also marked the Suns' halfway point into the regular season, which came by the Suns much faster than most of the teams in the NBA.
- January 15, 2015: Before the Suns' upcoming home game against the Minnesota Timberwolves and a day after assigning Archie Goodwin to the Bakersfield Jam again, the Suns completed a three-way trade with the Los Angeles Clippers and the Boston Celtics. The Suns got second-year player Reggie Bullock from the Los Angeles Clippers, while the Boston Celtics took on Shavlik Randolph's cap space in order for the Clippers to have coach Doc Rivers' son Austin Rivers become a part of the same team again.
- January 19, 2015: The Suns' home game against the Los Angeles Lakers was the first time in nearly two years that the Suns played a nationally televised game on TNT. Phoenix won in convincing fashion by 115–100 over the Lakers on that day, and they also completed their first season swept against the Lakers since the 2004–05 season. That game also provided the Suns' their 100th overall victory over the Lakers.
- January 24, 2015: Markieff and Marcus Morris got involved in an assault case with a former mentor of theirs named Eric Hood.
- January 30, 2015: After the Suns' 99–93 victory over the Chicago Bulls (which was Derrick Rose's first matchup against the Suns since 2011 and the Suns' first home victory over the Bulls since November 15, 2007), the Suns ended their longest homestand in team history with a 6–2 record.
- February 13, 2015: The NBA All-Star Weekend break begins.
- February 19, 2015: The NBA's trade deadline takes effect; the Suns completed a six-way trade with the Milwaukee Bucks, Miami Heat, New Orleans Pelicans, Philadelphia 76ers, and the Boston Celtics (again) by trading away both Zoran and Goran Dragić to the Heat, both Miles Plumlee and Tyler Ennis to the Bucks, Isaiah Thomas to the Celtics, and the Top-5 protected 2015 Los Angeles Lakers draft pick to the 76ers. In exchange, the Suns received star guard Brandon Knight (and Kendall Marshall) from the Bucks, Marcus Thornton from the Celtics, veteran small forward Danny Granger from the Heat, and John Salmons from the New Orleans Pelicans, as well as a 2016 first-round pick from the Celtics via the Cleveland Cavaliers and two future first-round draft picks from the Heat. This series of moves officially completed the transition period from the last time the Suns made it to the playoffs, as well as leaves only three current Suns players that were on the Suns during their second-worst season in team history. The Suns also waived both Kendall Marshall and John Salmons later that day.
- February 20, 2015: The Suns signed former Suns center and training camp invitee Earl Barron to a 10-day contract.
- March 3, 2015: The Suns signed center Earl Barron to a second 10-day contract.
- March 10, 2015: The Suns signed guard Seth Curry, brother of Stephen Curry, to a 10-day contract for back-up purposes due to an injury that Brandon Knight got during the second home game against, funnily enough, the Golden State Warriors.
- March 13, 2015: The Suns signed center Earl Barron for the rest of the season.
- March 20, 2015: After completing his initial 10 day contract, Seth Curry was waived replaced by backup point guard A.J. Price with his own 10 day contract.
- March 31, 2015: After completing his own 10 day contract, A.J. Price was waived from the team due to his poor performance.
- April 1, 2015: The Suns signed guard Bakersfield Jam affiliate guard Jerel McNeal to a 10-day contract.
- April 11, 2015: After completing his 10-day contract, the Suns decided to sign Jerel McNeal into the remainder of the 2015–16 NBA season.
- April 17, 2015: Brandon Knight underwent arthroscopic surgery to take care of an anterior flap that was causing irritation to his injured ankle.
- April 21, 2015: Markieff and Marcus Morris officially get felony assault charges on the same incident involving Eric Hood around January 2015.

== Offseason ==
=== Draft picks ===
Round	Pick	Player	Position	Nationality	College / Club
1	14	T. J. Warren	Small forward	United States	North Carolina State
1	18	Tyler Ennis	Point guard	Canada	Syracuse
1	27	Bogdan Bogdanović	Shooting guard	Serbia	(Serbia) Partizan Belgrade
2	50	Alec Brown	Center	United States	Wisconsin–Green Bay

The Phoenix Suns had three first-round picks and one second-round pick this season. Their highest first-round pick (the 14th pick) was their own that was also a part of the NBA draft lottery. Both of the extra draft picks the Suns had this season involved trades the Suns made last season. The 18th pick came from the Washington Wizards by the Suns trading Marcin Gortat, Kendall Marshall, Shannon Brown, and Malcolm Lee, with Phoenix also getting the rights of Emeka Okafor out of it. Their 27th pick, however, came from the Indiana Pacers due to the Suns trading power forward Luis Scola, with Phoenix also gaining Gerald Green and Miles Plumlee in the process. The lone second-round pick they have is also the pick they had on their own accord due to their 48–34 record being one of the best in the NBA that past season. Before the draft came up, the Suns also had two other second-round draft picks they had acquired from trades with the Los Angeles Lakers (Steve Nash for four draft picks and cash) and the Toronto Raptors (Sebastian Telfair for Hamed Haddadi and Toronto's second-round pick) in the 2012–13 season (the last season Lance Blanks was the Suns' general manager). However, both of those second rounders went to the Milwaukee Bucks due to the former first being traded to the Minnesota Timberwolves in a three-way trade that had the Suns getting rid of Robin Lopez and Hakim Warrick for the New Orleans Hornets in exchange for taking on a one–year deal with Wesley Johnson and the possibility of having a future Timberwolves first-round pick (which was eventually traded anyway) before being involved with Milwaukee in a later three-way trade with the Oklahoma City Thunder and the latter being involved with the Suns' own three-way trade with the Bucks and the Los Angeles Clippers in acquiring Eric Bledsoe (and Caron Butler) in exchange for Jared Dudley.

With the 14th pick, Phoenix selected T. J. Warren, a sophomore from North Carolina State University. Warren averaged 24.9 points and 7.1 rebounds per game, which earned him ACC Player of the Year and consensus second team All–American honors. The Suns also selected Canadian–born Tyler Ennis, a freshman from the Syracuse University with the 18th pick. Ennis averaged 12.9 points, 3.4 rebounds, 5.5 assists, and 2.1 steals in 35.7 minutes per game. Phoenix then selected the Serbian international prospect Bogdan Bogdanović of Partizan Belgrade as their 27th pick. Bogdanović averaged 14.8 points, 3.7 rebounds and assists, and 1.6 steals in 31.4 minutes per game for Partizan Belgrade, which helped him win the Euroleague's Rising Star award and the Basketball League of Serbia's Finals MVP award (as well as multiple international championships beforehand). Finally, with their 50th pick in the second round, the Suns decided to select Alec Brown, a senior from the University of Wisconsin–Green Bay. Brown averaged 15.3 points, 5.7 rebounds, and 3.1 blocks in his final season with the Phoenix, was named All–Horizon League first team, and won the Horizon League's Defensive Player of the Year award. He also co-led the Horizon League in career blocks with 309 total blocks, scored 1,678 points and grabbed 800 rebounds during his time in Green Bay.

=== Free agency ===
Veteran players Emeka Okafor and Leandro Barbosa, as well as the newly signed Shavlik Randolph, Ishmael "Ish" Smith, and Dionte Christmas all became unrestricted free agents as of the end of the 2013–14 NBA season. In addition, both co-star point guard Eric Bledsoe and P. J. Tucker ended up being restricted free agents as well. Not only that, but on June 22, 2014, Channing Frye decided to decline his final year of his contract he had earlier on with the team and decided to pursue free agency as well. On July 7, 2014, Frye ended up signing a 4-year, $32 million contract to play for the Orlando Magic. During the July Moratorium (July 10), the Suns re–signed P. J. Tucker to a three–year contract worth $16.5 million. Ish Smith became a free agent on July 15, 2014, during the deadline for teams to decide on whether they want to make Smith's, Randolph's, and Christmas' non-guaranteed contracts become fully guaranteed this season; Smith signed with the Houston Rockets three days later. Meanwhile, Shavlik Randolph's $1.23 million contract became guaranteed on July 17. A week later, Dionte Christmas was waived from the team. Leandro Barbosa left to sign a one-year veteran's minimum contract with the Golden State Warriors on August 28, 2014. On September 10, 2014, Dionte Christmas joined the New Orleans Pelicans. The only player to have not been signed at all was Emeka Okafor due to his injury problems and was originally planning to fully recover sometime around the 2015–16 NBA season. However, Okafor was out for four whole seasons (including the only one he was technically considered a part of the Suns) before signing a new training camp deal to play for a newly reformed Philadelphia 76ers squad on September 23, 2017 (although being waived by them on October 14 the same year before the regular season began, with the intent of playing for the Delaware 87ers that same year soon afterward before signing with the New Orleans Pelicans for the rest of the 2017–18 season, starting on February 3, 2018).

After trying to woo the likes of LeBron James, Carmelo Anthony, and even Chris Bosh to sign with the Suns, they ended up pursuing the likes of different free agents that were going under the radar at the time. For starters, a day after the Suns got P. J. Tucker to agree with a new deal for the Suns, the Sacramento Kings' point guard Isaiah Thomas ended up agreeing to a four-year contract worth $27 million. However, to ensure the Suns got Thomas, they agreed to trade last season's second-round pick Alex Oriakhi and a traded player exception worth $7 million in order to make sure the Kings didn't match their offer since Thomas was still a restricted free agent at the time. On July 16, 2014, the Suns signed power forward Anthony Tolliver, who had played for the Charlotte Bobcats back when they were named that before they became the new Charlotte Hornets, a two-year contract worth $6 million, with his second year only having $400,000 guaranteed with his contract. After the 2014 FIBA World Championship ended for Goran Dragić's team in Slovenia, the Suns planned on getting his brother Zoran Dragić on a contract buyout from Unicaja Málaga in Spain on September 12, 2014. The planned buyout involves the Suns paying $600,000 for the $1,100,000 required by the team, while Goran helped pay his brother the rest that was required for his buyout. The transaction was completed on September 24, 2014; he signed a two-year contract worth $4,012,500. Finally, after months of inactivity and even a trade rumor relating to the Minnesota Timberwolves, the Suns and Eric Bledsoe met over a new contract on September 23, 2014, finally agreeing to a five-year contract worth $70 million a day later. The new contract was the biggest since 2006 with Boris Diaw's 5-year, $45 million deal. Six days later, the Suns extended the contracts of Markieff and Marcus Morris to 4 year contracts worth $32 million and $20 million respectively.

On August 26, 2014, the Suns decided to sign both former Suns player Earl Barron (who last played for the New York Knicks) and the undrafted Casey Prather from the Florida Gators to non-guaranteed contracts for training camp. After that, the Suns signed the undrafted Joe Jackson from the Memphis Tigers under that same sort of deal. The Suns also signed Jamil Wilson of the Marquette Golden Eagles in September as well. However, the Suns waived Wilson, Jackson, and Prather from the team on October 14, 2014, while Barron was waived on October 25, 2014, after battling Shavlik Randolph (and Anthony Tolliver) for the final roster spot; everyone that was waived after the pre-season played in the affiliate Bakersfield Jam soon afterwards. However, Barron signed with the Suns again on February 20, 2015, well, after both Shavlik and Anthony left the team in different trades. This time, in his second stint with the Suns, they first gave him a 10-day contract. After succeeding in his initial test with limited playing time, the Suns gave him a second 10-day contract on March 3, 2015, before keeping him for the rest of the season on March 13, 2015. Around the time Earl was playing in his second 10-day contract, the Suns signed Stephen Curry's brother Seth Curry to a 10-day contract on March 10, 2015, after an injury Brandon Knight got against the Golden State Warriors a day earlier. After completing his 10-day contract, Seth was waived and replaced with back-up point guard A.J. Price on March 20, 2015, instead. When he failed under his 10-day stint as a player, he was waived on March 31, 2015, and replaced by affiliate Bakersfield Jam player (and eventual D-League Impact Player of the Year winner) Jerel McNeal a day later. Finally, after he finished his own 10-day contract, the Suns decided to sign Jerel into the 2015–16 season (so long as he'd meet team options by July 21, 2015, which was after the team's Summer League stint ended) on April 11, 2015.

==== Trades ====
During Christmas Eve, the Suns traded Anthony Tolliver to the Detroit Pistons in exchange for the rights to Tony Mitchell from North Texas University. Mitchell never played for the Suns, though, and on January 9, 2015, the Suns traded the conditional Minnesota Timberwolves first-round draft pick to the Boston Celtics in exchange for power forward/center Brandan Wright hours before their road game against the San Antonio Spurs began. That prompted the Suns to waive their rights to Tony Mitchell before they became guaranteed for the Suns. Nearly a week later, the Suns took part in another trade with the Celtics, this time being part of a three-way deal with the Los Angeles Clippers. In that deal, the Suns grabbed Reggie Bullock from the Clippers while the Celtics took on Shavlik Randolph's salary (as well as Chris Douglas–Roberts and a future second-round pick) in order for Doc Rivers' son Austin Rivers to play for the Clippers and be reunited in the process. Finally, during the trade deadline on February 19, 2015, after announcements of Goran Dragić displaying his major displeasure with the team as it was and wanting to be traded to a specific list of teams (those teams being either the rival Los Angeles Lakers, the New York Knicks with Carmelo Anthony, or the Miami Heat with Dwyane Wade and Chris Bosh), the Suns engaged in the equivalent of a seven-way trade that involved the likes of the Boston Celtics (once more), as well as the Miami Heat, the Milwaukee Bucks, the New Orleans Pelicans, the Philadelphia 76ers, and the Detroit Pistons (the only team Phoenix did not directly make a move with that day).

In the first trade the Suns did on the trade deadline, the Suns traded away the Dragić brothers in guards Goran and Zoran Dragić to the Miami Heat, while the Suns received veteran former-All-Star small forward Danny Granger and two different first-round picks from the Heat (one that was originally protected in 2017 until the Ted Stepien Rule changed it to 2018, with it still remaining protected until 2019 (the latest that Phoenix can receive their first selection as a completely unprotected first-round pick instead of having a top-7 protection at hand) and another that is completely unprotected in 2021), as well as veteran swingman John Salmons from the Pelicans, while New Orleans received two-time champion guard Norris Cole, power forward Shawne Williams, center Justin Hamilton, and cash considerations, which all came from the Heat. With their second trade, the Suns received guard Marcus Thornton (on an expiring contract) and a 2016 first-round draft pick (that'll be from the eventual NBA Finals champion Cleveland Cavaliers) from the Celtics in exchange for their biggest off-season signing in point guard Isaiah Thomas, with Boston also acquiring power forward Jonas Jerebko and guard Luigi Datome from the Pistons in exchange for the return of champion player Tayshaun Prince. Finally, in what was perceived at the time to be the trade the Suns got the biggest value out of other teams, the Suns traded away both rookie point guard Tyler Ennis and downgraded center Miles Plumlee to the Milwaukee Bucks and the projected 2015 Los Angeles Lakers' top 5 protected first-round draft pick that was ultimately conveyed by 2018 to the Philadelphia 76ers (in which Philadelphia gave up Rookie of The Year winning guard Michael Carter-Williams to the Bucks as well) in exchange for point guard Brandon Knight and injured former Suns point guard Kendall Marshall. Phoenix waived both John Salmons and Kendall Marshall later that day. Marshall joined the Philadelphia 76ers after this season ended, while Salmons still had before unofficially announcing his NBA retirement on September 23, 2018.

== Roster ==
2014–15 Phoenix Suns roster
Players

Pos.	No.	Player	Height	Weight	DOB	From
C	30	Earl Barron	7 ft 0 in (2.13 m)	250 lb (113 kg)	1981–08–14	Memphis
PG	2	Eric Bledsoe	6 ft 1 in (1.85 m)	195 lb (88 kg)	1989–12–09	Kentucky
SG	25	Reggie Bullock	6 ft 7 in (2.01 m)	205 lb (93 kg)	1991–03–16	North Carolina
SG	20	Archie Goodwin	6 ft 5 in (1.96 m)	198 lb (90 kg)	1994–08–17	Kentucky
SF	22	Danny Granger	6 ft 9 in (2.06 m)	222 lb (101 kg)	1983–04–20	New Mexico
SG	14	Gerald Green	6 ft 8 in (2.03 m)	210 lb (95 kg)	1986–01–26	Gulf Shores Academy (TX)
PG	3	Brandon Knight	6 ft 3 in (1.91 m)	189 lb (86 kg)	1991–12–02	Kentucky
C	21	Alex Len	7 ft 1 in (2.16 m)	265 lb (120 kg)	1993–06–16	Maryland
PG	8	Jerel McNeal	6 ft 3 in (1.91 m)	200 lb (91 kg)	1986–06–01	Marquette
SF	15	Marcus Morris	6 ft 10 in (2.08 m)	235 lb (107 kg)	1989–09–02	Kansas
PF	11	Markieff Morris	6 ft 10 in (2.08 m)	245 lb (111 kg)	1989–09–02	Kansas
SG	23	Marcus Thornton	6 ft 4 in (1.93 m)	205 lb (93 kg)	1987–06–05	LSU
SF	17	P. J. Tucker	6 ft 6 in (1.98 m)	224 lb (102 kg)	1985–05–05	Texas
SF	12	T. J. Warren (R)	6 ft 8 in (2.03 m)	220 lb (100 kg)	1993–09–05	NC State
PF	32	Brandan Wright	6 ft 10 in (2.08 m)	220 lb (100 kg)	1987–10–05	North Carolina

Coaches
Head coach
- Jeff Hornacek (Iowa State)
Assistant(s)
- Kenny Gattison (Old Dominion)
- Mike Longabardi (Frostburg State)
- Jerry Sichting (Purdue)
- Mark West (Old Dominion)
- Corey Gaines (Loyola Marymount)
- Irving Roland

Legend
- (DP) Unsigned draft pick
- (FA) Free agent
- (S) Suspended
- (DL) On assignment to D-League affiliate
- Injured

Roster

=== Salaries ===
Player	2014–15 Salary
Eric Bledsoe	$13,000,000
Marcus Thornton	$8,697,500
P. J. Tucker	$5,700,000
Brandan Wright	$5,000,000
Oleksiy "Alex" Len	$3,649,920
Brandon Knight	$3,553,917
Gerald Green	$3,500,000
Markieff Morris	$3,153,860
Marcus Morris	$3,105,301
Danny Granger	$2,100,000
T. J. Warren	$1,953,120
Reggie Bullock	$1,200,720
Archie Goodwin	$1,112,200
Earl Barron	$390,063
Jerel McNeal	$59,686
TOTAL	$56,176,287

Because of a few past transactions made from Lance Blanks' tenure that didn't pan out so well for the Suns, Josh Childress was still owed $7,317,500 due to them amnestying his contract two seasons ago, while under the Michael Beasley buyout the Suns did on September 3, 2013, they owed Beasley the equivalent of $2,333,333 for the next three seasons as opposed to giving him the guaranteed amount of $3,000,000 he was owed in his original contract. While Josh Childress' salary did not affect the Suns' overall salary cap to their season that year (and was the last time Phoenix owed money to him, especially considering Childress went to the Sydney Kings in Australia this season), Michael Beasley's contract still affected the Suns' salary despite Beasley going to the Shanghai Sharks in China that season as well before returning to the Miami Heat later on in the season, but only for a few thousand dollars (around $777,778) instead of a few million. In addition, the Suns also bought out the short, small contracts of North Texas University power forward Tony Mitchell, former Suns point guard Kendall Marshall, and John Salmons after finishing their respective deals with the Detroit Pistons, Milwaukee Bucks, and New Orleans Pelicans.

== Pre-season ==
2014 pre-season game log
Total: 5–2 (Home: 3–0; Road: 2–2)
Pre-season: 5–2 (home: 3–0; road: 2–2)

Game	Date	Team	Score	High points	High rebounds	High assists	Location Attendance	Record
1	October 8	Flamengo	W 100–88	Isaiah Thomas (18)	Marcus Morris (7)	Isaiah Thomas (4)	US Airways Center; 8,041	1–0
2	October 10	Denver	W 97–89	Goran Dragić, Markieff Morris (12)	P. J. Tucker (10)	Isaiah Thomas (6)	US Airways Center; 11,734	2–0
3	October 13	@ Houston	L 92–95	Eric Bledsoe (13)	Earl Barron (13)	Isaiah Thomas (6)	Toyota Center; 14,642	2–1
4	October 16	San Antonio	W 121–90	Goran Dragić (20)	Markieff Morris (7)	Goran Dragić, Eric Bledsoe (6)	US Airways Center; 13,552	3–1
5	October 21	@ L.A. Lakers	W 114–108 (OT)	Isaiah Thomas (26)	P. J. Tucker (8)	Eric Bledsoe (6)	Honda Center (Anaheim); 8,037	4–1
6	October 22	@ L.A. Clippers	L 105–108	Eric Bledsoe (27)	Miles Plumlee, Marcus Morris, P. J. Tucker (8)	Goran Dragić, Isaiah Thomas (4)	Staples Center; 13,477	4–2
7	October 24	@ Utah	W 105–100	Goran Dragić, Isaiah Thomas (18)	Markieff Morris, Olexsiy "Alex" Len (6)	Eric Bledsoe (5)	EnergySolutions Arena; 18,087	5–2

2014–15 season schedule

== Regular season ==
=== Standings ===
Pacific Division	W	L	PCT	GB	Home	Road	Div	GP
z-Golden State Warriors	67	15	.817	–	39‍–‍2	28‍–‍13	13–3	82
x-Los Angeles Clippers	56	26	.683	11.0	30‍–‍11	26‍–‍15	12–4	82
Phoenix Suns	39	43	.476	28.0	22‍–‍19	17‍–‍24	6–10	82
Sacramento Kings	29	53	.354	38.0	18‍–‍23	11‍–‍30	7–9	82
Los Angeles Lakers	21	61	.256	46.0	12‍–‍29	9‍–‍32	2–14	82

Western Conference
#	Team	W	L	PCT	GB	GP
1	z-Golden State Warriors *	67	15	.817	–	82
2	y-Houston Rockets *	56	26	.683	11.0	82
3	x-Los Angeles Clippers	56	26	.683	11.0	82
4	y-Portland Trail Blazers *	51	31	.622	16.0	82
5	x-Memphis Grizzlies	55	27	.671	12.0	82
6	x-San Antonio Spurs	55	27	.671	12.0	82
7	x-Dallas Mavericks	50	32	.610	17.0	82
8	x-New Orleans Pelicans	45	37	.549	22.0	82
9	Oklahoma City Thunder	45	37	.549	22.0	82
10	Phoenix Suns	39	43	.476	28.0	82
11	Utah Jazz	38	44	.463	29.0	82
12	Denver Nuggets	30	52	.366	37.0	82
13	Sacramento Kings	29	53	.354	38.0	82
14	Los Angeles Lakers	21	61	.256	46.0	82
15	Minnesota Timberwolves	16	66	.195	51.0	82

=== Game log ===
2014–15 game log
Total: 39–43 (Home: 22–19; Road: 17–24)
October: 2–0 (home: 2–0; road: 0–0)

Game	Date	Team	Score	High points	High rebounds	High assists	Location Attendance	Record
1	October 29	L.A. Lakers	W 119–99	Isaiah Thomas (23)	Miles Plumlee, Eric Bledsoe, Anthony Tolliver (6)	Eric Bledsoe (9)	US Airways Center; 17,523	1–0
2	October 31	San Antonio	W 94–89	Isaiah Thomas (23)	Markieff Morris, Oleksiy "Alex" Len (11)	Isaiah Thomas (4)	US Airways Center; 15,050	2–0

November : 8–8 (home: 3–3; road: 5–5)

Game	Date	Team	Score	High points	High rebounds	High assists	Location Attendance	Record
3	November 1	@ Utah	L 91–118	Gerald Green (16)	Markieff Morris (7)	Eric Bledsoe (8)	EnergySolutions Arena; 17,721	2–1
4	November 4	@ L.A. Lakers	W 112–106	Gerald Green (26)	Markieff Morris (10)	Isaiah Thomas (9)	Staples Center; 18,997	3–1
5	November 5	Memphis	L 91–102	Eric Bledsoe (23)	P. J. Tucker (11)	Eric Bledsoe (4)	US Airways Center; 15,377	3–2
6	November 7	Sacramento	L 112–114 (2OT)	Eric Bledsoe (23)	Miles Plumlee (16)	Eric Bledsoe (8)	US Airways Center; 15,476	3–3
7	November 9	Golden State	W 107–95	Isaiah Thomas (22)	Marcus Morris (9)	Isaiah Thomas (7)	US Airways Center; 16,046	4–3
8	November 12	Brooklyn	W 112–104	Gerald Green (28)	Miles Plumlee (10)	Goran Dragić (6)	US Airways Center; 15,184	5–3
9	November 14	Charlotte	L 95–103	Eric Bledsoe (22)	Eric Bledsoe (11)	Eric Bledsoe (5)	US Airways Center; 16,291	5–4
10	November 15	@ L.A. Clippers	L 107–120	Gerald Green (26)	Oleksiy "Alex" Len (11)	Eric Bledsoe (10)	Staples Center; 19,060	5–5
11	November 17	@ Boston	W 118–114	Markieff Morris (30)	Markieff Morris, Oleksiy "Alex" Len (7)	Marcus Morris, Goran Dragić, Eric Bledsoe (7)	TD Garden; 16,726	6–5
12	November 19	@ Detroit	W 88–86	Eric Bledsoe (18)	Miles Plumlee (10)	Eric Bledsoe, Goran Dragić, Gerald Green (4)	Palace of Auburn Hills; 10,686	7–5
13	November 21	@ Philadelphia	W 122–96	Isaiah Thomas (23)	P. J. Tucker (8)	Isaiah Thomas (8)	Wells Fargo Center; 16,789	8–5
14	November 22	@ Indiana	W 106–83	Gerald Green (23)	Eric Bledsoe (9)	Eric Bledsoe (5)	Bankers Life Fieldhouse; 16,870	9–5
15	November 24	@ Toronto	L 100–104	Eric Bledsoe (25)	Markieff Morris, P. J. Tucker (8)	Eric Bledsoe (6)	Air Canada Centre; 19,800	9–6
16	November 26	Denver	W 120–112	Gerald Green (24)	Markieff Morris (10)	Eric Bledsoe (10)	US Airways Center; 16,099	10–6
17	November 28	@ Denver	L 97–112	Eric Bledsoe (16)	Oleksiy "Alex" Len (8)	Eric Bledsoe (4)	Pepsi Center; 15,509	10–7
18	November 30	Orlando	L 90–93	Goran Dragić (22)	Markieff Morris (7)	Markieff Morris (10)	US Airways Center; 15,558	10–8

December : 8–8 (home: 2–3; road: 6–5)

Game	Date	Team	Score	High points	High rebounds	High assists	Location Attendance	Record
19	December 2	Indiana	W 116–99	Goran Dragić (34)	Miles Plumlee, P. J. Tucker (7)	Eric Bledsoe (7)	US Airways Center; 15,059	11–8
20	December 5	@ Dallas	W 118–106	Goran Dragić (28)	Markieff Morris (10)	Goran Dragić (13)	American Airlines Center; 20,010	12–8
21	December 6	@ Houston	L 95–100	Eric Bledsoe (23)	P. J. Tucker (8)	Goran Dragić (6)	Toyota Center; 18,060	12–9
22	December 8	@ L.A. Clippers	L 120–121 (OT)	Eric Bledsoe (27)	Eric Bledsoe (11)	Eric Bledsoe (16)	Staples Center; 19,060	12–10
23	December 9	Miami	L 97–103	Marcus Morris (25)	Miles Plumlee, Eric Bledsoe, Marcus Morris (5)	Eric Bledsoe (8)	US Airways Center; 14,963	12–11
24	December 12	Detroit	L 103–105	Goran Dragić (18)	P. J. Tucker (9)	Goran Dragić (5)	US Airways Center; 17,007	12–12
25	December 14	@ Oklahoma City	L 88–112	Gerald Green (15)	Miles Plumlee, Gerald Green (7)	Eric Bledsoe, Isaiah Thomas (4)	Chesapeake Energy Arena; 18,203	12–13
26	December 15	Milwaukee	L 94–96	Markieff Morris (25)	Gerald Green (8)	P. J. Tucker, Eric Bledsoe (4)	US Airways Center; 17,327	12–14
27	December 17	@ Charlotte	W 111–106	Isaiah Thomas (23)	Markieff Morris (8)	Goran Dragić (8)	Time Warner Cable Arena; 15,459	13–14
28	December 20	@ New York	W 99–90	Eric Bledsoe (25)	Eric Bledsoe (10)	Eric Bledsoe, Isaiah Thomas, Gerald Green, P. J. Tucker (3)	Madison Square Garden; 19,812	14–14
29	December 21	@ Washington	W 104–92	Eric Bledsoe, Markieff Morris (17)	Eric Bledsoe (9)	Goran Dragić (4)	Verizon Center; 18,207	15–14
30	December 23	Dallas	W 124–115	Goran Dragić (25)	Eric Bledsoe (10)	Eric Bledsoe (11)	US Airways Center; 18,055	16–14
31	December 26	@ Sacramento	W 115–106	Marcus Morris (20)	Oleksiy "Alex" Len (11)	Eric Bledsoe, Goran Dragić (6)	Sleep Train Arena; 17,317	17–14
32	December 28	@ L.A. Lakers	W 116–107	Goran Dragić (24)	Eric Bledsoe, Oleksiy "Alex" Len (8)	Eric Bledsoe (8)	Staples Center; 18,997	18–14
33	December 30	@ New Orleans	L 106–110	Goran Dragić (22)	Eric Bledsoe (8)	Eric Bledsoe, Goran Dragić, Isaiah Thomas (3)	Smoothie King Center; 16,364	18–15
34	December 31	@ Oklahoma City	L 134–137 (OT)	Eric Bledsoe (29)	Goran Dragić (8)	Eric Bledsoe (8)	Chesapeake Energy Arena; 18,203	18–16

January : 10–5 (home: 8–2; road: 2–3)

Game	Date	Team	Score	High points	High rebounds	High assists	Location Attendance	Record
35	January 2	Philadelphia	W 112–96	Gerald Green, Markieff Morris (21)	Goran Dragić (10)	Eric Bledsoe (8)	US Airways Center; 16,514	19–16
36	January 4	Toronto	W 125–109	Eric Bledsoe (20)	Miles Plumlee (7)	Eric Bledsoe (8)	US Airways Center; 17,166	20–16
37	January 6	@ Milwaukee	W 102–96	Markieff Morris (26)	Markieff Morris (10)	Eric Bledsoe (10)	BMO Harris Bradley Center; 12,311	21–16
38	January 7	@ Minnesota	W 113–111	Goran Dragić (25)	P. J. Tucker (9)	Goran Dragić (4)	Target Center; 10,547	22–16
39	January 9	@ San Antonio	L 95–100	Eric Bledsoe, P. J. Tucker (19)	Oleksiy "Alex" Len (12)	Eric Bledsoe (10)	AT&T Center; 18,581	22–17
40	January 11	@ Memphis	L 110–122 (2OT)	Isaiah Thomas (20)	Oleksiy "Alex" Len (13)	Eric Bledsoe (5)	FedExForum; 17,212	22–18
41	January 13	Cleveland	W 107–100	Markieff Morris (35)	Oleksiy "Alex" Len (10)	Eric Bledsoe (6)	US Airways Center; 16,819	23–18
42	January 16	Minnesota	W 110–99	Goran Dragić (21)	Oleksiy "Alex" Len (12)	Goran Dragić (8)	US Airways Center; 17,441	24–18
43	January 19	L.A. Lakers	W 115–100	Goran Dragić, Isaiah Thomas (24)	Goran Dragić (9)	Eric Bledsoe (7)	US Airways Center; 17,435	25–18
44	January 21	Portland	W 118–113	Eric Bledsoe (33)	P. J. Tucker (13)	Eric Bledsoe (6)	US Airways Center; 16,703	26–18
45	January 23	Houston	L 111–113	Eric Bledsoe (25)	Oleksiy "Alex" Len (11)	Eric Bledsoe (9)	US Airways Center; 16,701	26–19
46	January 25	L.A. Clippers	L 100–120	Isaiah Thomas (25)	Miles Plumlee (7)	Goran Dragić (8)	US Airways Center; 17,066	26–20
47	January 28	Washington	W 106–98	Goran Dragić (20)	P. J. Tucker (10)	Eric Bledsoe (6)	US Airways Center; 16,209	27–20
48	January 30	Chicago	W 99–93	Eric Bledsoe (23)	Markieff Morris (14)	Eric Bledsoe (6)	US Airways Center; 18,055	28–20
49	January 31	@ Golden State	L 87–106	Markieff Morris (17)	Markieff Morris (11)	Isaiah Thomas (5)	Oracle Arena; 19,596	28–21

February : 3–7 (home: 2–4; road: 1–3)

Game	Date	Team	Score	High points	High rebounds	High assists	Location Attendance	Record
50	February 2	Memphis	L 101–102	Isaiah Thomas (24)	Oleksiy "Alex" Len, Eric Bledsoe (7)	Eric Bledsoe (7)	US Airways Center; 17,199	28–22
51	February 5	@ Portland	L 87–108	Markieff Morris (18)	Markieff Morris (8)	Goran Dragić (5)	Moda Center; 19,488	28–23
52	February 6	Utah	W 100–93	Marcus Morris (34)	Marcus Morris (12)	Eric Bledsoe, Goran Dragić (6)	US Airways Center; 18,055	29–23
53	February 8	@ Sacramento	L 83–85	Isaiah Thomas (26)	Miles Plumlee (12)	Isaiah Thomas, Goran Dragić (5)	Sleep Train Arena; 17,013	29–24
54	February 10	Houston	L 118–127	Eric Bledsoe (32)	P. J. Tucker, Miles Plumlee (7)	Isaiah Thomas (6)	US Airways Center; 17,071	29–25
All-Star Break
55	February 20	@ Minnesota	L 109–111	Markieff Morris (31)	Oleksiy "Alex" Len (10)	Eric Bledsoe, Gerald Green (6)	Target Center; 14,077	29–26
56	February 21	@ Chicago	L 107–112	P. J. Tucker (20)	Oleksiy "Alex" Len (11)	Eric Bledsoe (8)	United Center; 22,292	29–27
57	February 23	Boston	L 110–115	Eric Bledsoe (21)	Oleksiy "Alex" Len, P. J. Tucker (12)	Eric Bledsoe (10)	US Airways Center; 17,076	29–28
58	February 25	@ Denver	W 110–96	Brandon Knight (19)	Oleksiy "Alex" Len (10)	Eric Bledsoe, Brandon Knight (6)	Pepsi Center; 12,813	30–28
59	February 26	Oklahoma City	W 117–113 (OT)	Markieff Morris (29)	Eric Bledsoe (13)	Eric Bledsoe (9)	US Airways Center; 17,514	31–28
60	February 28	San Antonio	L 74–101	Marcus Morris (19)	P. J. Tucker (11)	Markieff Morris, Archie Goodwin (3)	US Airways Center; 18,055	31–29

March : 7–8 (home: 4–5; road: 3–3)

Game	Date	Team	Score	High points	High rebounds	High assists	Location Attendance	Record
61	March 2	@ Miami	L 98–115	Eric Bledsoe, P. J. Tucker (20)	P. J. Tucker (14)	Brandon Knight (7)	American Airlines Arena; 19,600	31–30
62	March 4	@ Orlando	W 105–100	Brandon Knight (28)	Eric Bledsoe (7)	Eric Bledsoe (9)	Amway Center; 15,822	32–30
63	March 6	@ Brooklyn	W 108–100 (OT)	Eric Bledsoe, Marcus Morris, Markieff Morris (19)	Eric Bledsoe (10)	Brandon Knight (7)	Barclays Center; 16,445	33–30
64	March 7	@ Cleveland	L 79–89	Markieff Morris (16)	P. J. Tucker (9)	Eric Bledsoe (9)	Quicken Loans Arena; 20,562	33–31
65	March 9	Golden State	L 80–98	Eric Bledsoe (19)	Oleksiy "Alex" Len (11)	Eric Bledsoe, Markieff Morris (3)	US Airways Center; 18,055	33–32
66	March 11	Minnesota	W 106–97	Markieff Morris (24)	Marcus Morris, Brandan Wright (9)	Eric Bledsoe (9)	US Airways Center; 17,367	34–32
67	March 13	Atlanta	L 87–96	Markieff Morris (22)	P. J. Tucker (9)	Eric Bledsoe (6)	US Airways Center; 17,136	34–33
68	March 15	New York	W 102–89	Eric Bledsoe (21)	Brandan Wright (11)	Eric Bledsoe (11)	US Airways Center; 17,264	35–33
69	March 19	New Orleans	W 74–72	Markieff Morris (17)	Marcus Morris (13)	Marcus Morris (4)	US Airways Center; 18,055	36–33
70	March 21	@ Houston	W 117–102	Eric Bledsoe (34)	Marcus Morris (10)	Markieff Morris (6)	Toyota Center; 18,340	37–33
71	March 22	Dallas	W 98–92	Eric Bledsoe (20)	Markieff Morris (13)	Eric Bledsoe (9)	US Airways Center; 17,435	38–33
72	March 25	Sacramento	L 99–108	Markieff Morris (24)	P. J. Tucker (11)	Markieff Morris, P. J. Tucker (4)	US Airways Center; 17,589	38–34
73	March 27	Portland	L 81–87	Marcus Morris (19)	Marcus Morris (12)	Eric Bledsoe (7)	US Airways Center; 17,219	38–35
74	March 29	Oklahoma City	L 97–109	Markieff Morris (24)	Oleksiy "Alex" Len (11)	Eric Bledsoe (7)	US Airways Center; 17,538	38–36
75	March 30	@ Portland	L 86–109	Gerald Green, T. J. Warren (13)	P. J. Tucker (11)	Eric Bledsoe (7)	Moda Center; 19,441	38–37

April : 1–6 (home: 1–1; road: 0–5)

Game	Date	Team	Score	High points	High rebounds	High assists	Location Attendance	Record
76	April 2	@ Golden State	L 106–107	Eric Bledsoe (18)	Markieff Morris, Brandan Wright (12)	Eric Bledsoe (11)	Oracle Arena; 19,596	38–38
77	April 4	Utah	W 87–85	Gerald Green (24)	P. J. Tucker (9)	Eric Bledsoe (5)	US Airways Center; 18,055	39–38
78	April 7	@ Atlanta	L 69–96	Gerald Green (15)	Markieff Morris, Brandan Wright (6)	Eric Bledsoe, Markieff Morris (5)	Philips Arena; 18,650	39–39
79	April 8	@ Dallas	L 104–107	Gerald Green (30)	Marcus Morris (10)	Markieff Morris (7)	American Airlines Center; 20,262	39–40
80	April 10	@ New Orleans	L 75–90	Eric Bledsoe (19)	Markieff Morris (11)	Eric Bledsoe (7)	Smoothie King Center; 17,954	39–41
81	April 12	@ San Antonio	L 91–107	Gerald Green (23)	Marcus Morris, P. J. Tucker (8)	Eric Bledsoe (10)	AT&T Center; 18,581	39–42
82	April 14	L.A. Clippers	L 101–112	Archie Goodwin (18)	Markieff Morris, P. J. Tucker (8)	Eric Bledsoe (9)	US Airways Center; 18,055	39–43

2014–15 season schedule

== Player statistics ==
Legend
GP	Games played	GS	Games started	MPG	Minutes per game
FG%	Field-goal percentage	3P%	3-point field-goal percentage	FT%	Free-throw percentage
RPG	Rebounds per game	APG	Assists per game	SPG	Steals per game
BPG	Blocks per game	PPG	Points per game

Player	GP	GS	MPG	FG%	3P%	FT%	RPG	APG	SPG	BPG	PPG
Earl Barron	16	1	8.9	.308	.500	.500	1.8	0.3	.3	.1	2.0
Eric Bledsoe	81	81	34.6	.447	.324	.800	5.2	6.1	1.6	.6	17.0
Reggie Bullock*	11	0	6.8	.063	.000	.500	0.9	0.2	.1	.2	0.4
Seth Curry	2	0	4.0	.000	.000	.	1.0	0.5	.0	.0	0.0
Goran Dragić*	52	52	33.4	.501	.355	.746	3.6	4.1	1.0	.2	16.2
Zoran Dragić*	6	0	2.2	.250	.000	.667	0.5	0.2	.0	.0	1.0
Tyler Ennis*	8	0	7.3	.429	.333	1.000	0.9	1.8	.0	.3	2.8
Archie Goodwin	41	2	13.0	.393	.293	.735	1.8	1.1	.4	.2	5.6
Gerald Green	74	4	19.5	.416	.354	.825	2.5	1.2	.6	.2	11.9
Brandon Knight*	11	9	31.5	.357	.313	.828	2.1	4.5	.5	.1	13.4
Alex Len	69	44	22.0	.507	.333	.702	6.6	0.5	.5	1.5	6.3
Jerel McNeal	6	0	6.0	.273	.500	1.000	0.5	0.3	.5	.2	1.5
Marcus Morris	81	35	25.2	.434	.358	.628	4.8	1.6	.8	.2	10.4
Markieff Morris	82	82	31.5	.465	.318	.763	6.2	2.3	1.2	.5	15.3
Miles Plumlee*	54	28	18.6	.549	.	.500	5.1	0.5	.6	1.0	4.3
A.J. Price*	5	0	8.8	.214	.000	.	0.6	1.2	.0	.0	1.2
Shavlik Randolph*	16	0	6.3	.240	.000	.500	1.6	0.2	.3	.1	1.1
Isaiah Thomas*	46	1	25.7	.426	.391	.872	2.4	3.7	1.0	.1	15.2
Marcus Thornton*	9	0	9.0	.325	.105	.800	1.4	0.2	.7	.0	3.6
Anthony Tolliver*	24	0	11.3	.351	.387	.667	1.8	0.4	.2	.0	3.3
P. J. Tucker	78	63	30.6	.438	.345	.727	6.4	1.6	1.4	.3	9.1
T. J. Warren	40	1	15.4	.528	.238	.737	2.1	0.6	.5	.2	6.1
Brandan Wright*	40	7	21.5	.580	.000	.667	4.9	0.6	.8	1.2	7.0

* – Stats with the Suns.

== Injuries/Personal games missed ==
Player	Duration		Reason for Missed Time	Games Missed
Player	Start	End	Reason for Missed Time	Games Missed
P. J. Tucker	August 12, 2014	November 4, 2014	Suspension without $155,455 in pay for super-extreme DUI	3
T. J. Warren	October 21, 2014	November 9, 2014	Injured left thumb by being caught in a Lakers jersey	6
Tyler Ennis	November 13, 2014	November 17, 2014	Assigned to the Bakersfield Jam by the Suns	2
T. J. Warren	November 13, 2014	November 17, 2014	Assigned to the Bakersfield Jam by the Suns	2
P. J. Tucker	November 17, 2014	November 19, 2014	Missed team bus for flight from Los Angeles to Boston	1
Isaiah Thomas	November 25, 2014	December 12, 2014	Twisted ankle against Toronto at 4th quarter	8
Goran Dragić	December 14, 2014	December 18, 2014	Had a strained lower back problem	2
Archie Goodwin	December 25, 2014	December 31, 2014	Assigned to the Bakersfield Jam by the Suns	3
Tyler Ennis	December 25, 2014	December 31, 2014	Assigned to the Bakersfield Jam by the Suns	3
T. J. Warren	December 25, 2014	December 31, 2014	Assigned to the Bakersfield Jam by the Suns	3
Brandan Wright	January 9, 2015	January 11, 2015	Wasn't ready to play for the Suns yet due to recent trade	1
Archie Goodwin	January 14, 2015	January 21, 2015	Assigned to the Bakersfield Jam by the Suns	2
Reggie Bullock	January 15, 2015	January 21, 2015	Wasn't ready to play for the Suns yet due to recent trade	2
Tyler Ennis	January 22, 2015	January 28, 2015	Assigned to the Bakersfield Jam by the Suns	2
T. J. Warren	January 22, 2015	January 28, 2015	Assigned to the Bakersfield Jam by the Suns	2
Brandan Wright	January 25, 2015	January 28, 2015	Had a sore left heel bone	1
Archie Goodwin	January 29, 2015	February 2, 2015	Assigned to the Bakersfield Jam by the Suns	2
Reggie Bullock	January 29, 2015	February 2, 2015	Assigned to the Bakersfield Jam by the Suns	2
Gerald Green	January 30, 2015	January 31, 2015	Rest a tired leg	1
Tyler Ennis	February 4, 2015	February 8, 2015	Assigned to the Bakersfield Jam by the Suns	2
T. J. Warren	February 4, 2015	February 8, 2015	Assigned to the Bakersfield Jam by the Suns	2
Oleksiy "Alex" Len	February 5, 2015	February 20, 2015	Injured right ankle during third quarter against Portland	3
Archie Goodwin	February 8, 2015	February 11, 2015	Assigned to the Bakersfield Jam by the Suns	2
Reggie Bullock	February 8, 2015	February 11, 2015	Assigned to the Bakersfield Jam by the Suns	2
Eric Bledsoe	February 8, 2015	February 10, 2015	Traveled to Alabama for the birth of his son Ethan	1
Brandon Knight	February 20, 2015	February 21, 2015	Wasn't ready to play for the Suns yet due to recent trade	1
Marcus Thornton	February 20, 2015	February 23, 2015	Wasn't ready to play for the Suns yet due to recent trade	2
Earl Barron	February 21, 2015	February 23, 2015	Wasn't ready to play for the Suns yet due to recent signing	1
Oleksiy "Alex" Len	March 7, 2015	March 9, 2015	Injured right ankle during third quarter against Brooklyn	1
Brandon Knight	March 11, 2015	March 29, 2015	Injured left ankle during second quarter against Golden State	8
Oleksiy "Alex" Len	March 15, 2015	March 21, 2015	Injured right ankle during fourth quarter against Atlanta	2
Marcus Thornton	March 19, 2015	April 7, 2015	Injured right big toe during practice	9
Brandon Knight	March 30, 2015	October 28, 2015	Left ankle continued to bother him	8
Oleksiy "Alex" Len	April 2, 2015	October 28, 2015	Broken nose during road game against Portland	7
Marcus Thornton	April 10, 2015	April 14, 2015	Hurt left ankle during practice	3
Brandan Wright	April 12, 2015	April 14, 2015	Had a left ankle sprain after the last game against New Orleans	2
Reggie Bullock	April 12, 2015	April 14, 2015	Had a concussion after the last game against New Orleans	2
Marcus Morris	April 14, 2015	April 14, 2015	Had a stomach virus before the last game of the season	1

== Awards and records ==
=== Awards ===
- T. J. Warren earned All-NBA Second Team Las Vegas Summer League Honors due to his performance in the 2014 NBA Summer League.
- Isaiah Thomas was the runner-up for the NBA Sixth Man of the Year Award for his performances with both the Suns and the Boston Celtics.
- Brandon Knight was considered a candidate for the NBA Most Improved Player Award for his performances with the Milwaukee Bucks and the Suns.

==== All-Star ====
- Isaiah Thomas was announced as one of eight different participants to compete in the Taco Bell Skills Challenge during All-Star Weekend. His first opponent in the revamped competition was John Wall of the Washington Wizards. He'd end up being the shortest player to ever participate in the Taco Bell Skills Challenge. Thomas end up losing to the eventual champion Patrick Beverley (who replaced his initial first round opponent John Wall) in the first round.
  - Eventual Suns player Brandon Knight also lost to Beverley in the competition, only as the final opponent in the championship round.

=== Records ===
- When the Suns traded Shavlik Randolph to the Boston Celtics and got Reggie Bullock from the Los Angeles Clippers, they were the only team in the league to not have any players go over the age of 30. The Suns continued with that line-up for around a month until acquiring 31-year-old Danny Granger in a multi-team trade and later signed the 33-year-old Earl Barron from the affiliate Bakersfield Jam (which was the first time the Suns called someone who initially came from the Jam D-League team to the Suns) to two 10 day contracts before signing back on for the rest of the season.
- On the Suns' 117–113 overtime victory over Russell Westbrook and the Oklahoma City Thunder, Eric Bledsoe recorded 28 points on 11/16 shooting, 13 rebounds, 9 assists, 4 blocks, and 1 steal. Eric was the 9th player in NBA history to record similar kinds of statistics during the regular season, as well as the first point guard to record 50% shooting for 28 or more points while grabbing 13 or more rebounds, getting 9 or more assists, 4 or more blocks, and at least one steal in a game.
- The Suns became the first (and so far, only) team in the history of the NBA to host a +43 and a -43 point differential in-between games this season, with them getting a -43 from their 117–113 overtime victory against the Oklahoma City Thunder to their brutal 101–74 loss to the defending champion San Antonio Spurs late in February, and then getting a +43 from going off of a close 74–72 victory over the New Orleans Pelicans at home to having a blowout 117–102 victory over the Houston Rockets on the road in March.

=== Team records ===
- The Suns broke their season-opening record of three-point shots made in their opening game with 16 made three-pointers in their 119–99 victory against the Los Angeles Lakers on October 29, 2014. (Their previous record was 13 on Halloween day in 2006, which coincidentally was also against the Lakers.)
- Isaiah Thomas' 23 points against the Lakers on October 29 was the most points a Suns player scored off the bench under their debut appearance with the team.
- Isaiah Thomas' 200 points in 13 games was the most scored by a bench player since Tom Chambers during the 1992–93 season.
- The two blowout road victories against the Philadelphia 76ers and Indiana Pacers on November 21 & 22, 2014 was the first time the Suns won back-to-back games on the road by 20 or more points since 2004.
- Gerald Green's 24 games where he'd make at least one three-pointer (starting with that November 21, 2014 victory against the Philadelphia 76ers and ending on their January 6, 2015 victory against the Milwaukee Bucks) tied the Suns' highest mark with his former teammate Channing Frye getting at least one three-pointer going in for 24 straight games in the 2010–11 NBA season.
- Starting on January 13, 2015, against the Cleveland Cavaliers, the Suns begin an 8-game homestand that was also the longest homestand in franchise history. With their victory over the Washington Wizards on January 28, the Suns were guaranteed to end their homestand with a winning record; they ended it with a 6–2 record.
- With the Suns getting Seth Curry on March 11, 2015, they have officially had over 10% of their all-time roster representing relatives (fathers, sons, brothers, cousins, nephews, etc.) that had also played in either the NBA and/or the ABA at one point.
- The 24 points the Suns scored in the first half of their 101–74 loss to the defending champion San Antonio Spurs on February 28, 2015, was the franchise's lowest scoring half ever. That record was broken a year later on January 3, 2016, against the Los Angeles Lakers with 22 points scored in the first half.
- The Suns' 74–72 victory over the New Orleans Pelicans on March 19, 2015, tied the fewest points scored by the Suns in a victory (tying the record set on January 30, 1998 against the Miami Heat on the road with a 74–71 victory there), as well as set the fewest points scored in a victory for the team at a home game.
- With the Suns having 23 different players getting playing time with the team at one point or another in the season, it tied the 1996–97 Phoenix Suns season for the most players to play at least one game with the Suns in a single season. That mark was matched once again next season, although for different reasons.

=== Milestones ===
- With the Suns signing Zoran Dragić alongside his brother Goran Dragić, as well as extending both Markieff Morris and his twin brother Marcus Morris on September 29, 2014, this team marked the first time ever that different pairs of siblings/brothers played for the same team. All four players appeared for the first time in the same game under a November loss against the Los Angeles Clippers. Both pairs of brothers later made their first (and only) appearances together at the same time late in the fourth quarter and each produced numbers throughout the game in their January 2, 2015 112–96 victory against the Philadelphia 76ers.
- When the Suns traded Shavlik Randolph for Reggie Bullock on January 15, 2015, the Suns made sure they had no players that were over the age of 30 on their roster. This marks one of the few, if only times where an NBA team had no one over the age of 30 signed onto their roster. It continued to be the case until the February 19, 2015 when the Suns got Danny Granger in a trade with the Miami Heat and later on got Earl Barron from the affiliate Bakersfield Jam (back) on the team in the process.

=== Team milestones ===
- Goran Dragić surpassed forward Cedric Ceballos as the Suns' 28th best scorer of all time on the team near the start of the third quarter of the October 29, 2014 game against the Los Angeles Lakers. Goran scored 18 points as the Suns blew out the Lakers by the final score of 119–99.
- Goran surpassed center James Edwards to become the Suns' 27th best all-time scorer near the start of the third quarter by making two free throws in the Halloween game against the defending champion San Antonio Spurs. Goran scored 10 points as the Suns kept it close and won by the score of 94–89.
- Goran surpassed former Sixth Man of the Year small forward and current Suns broadcaster Eddie Johnson to become the Suns' 26th best all-time scorer near the end of the fourth quarter by scoring a critical layup during the last minute of the game. He scored 22 points in the November 17, 2014 game against the Boston Celtics as the Suns won a close one by the score of 118–114.
- Goran Dragić surpassed Hall of Fame guard Dennis Johnson to become the Suns' 25th best all-time scorer with 7.6 seconds remaining in the fourth quarter by scoring a quick layup to end the 120–112 victory on the November 26, 2014 home game against the Denver Nuggets.
- The Suns' 10–6 record was their best start to the season since the 2009–10 NBA season.
- Goran surpassed point guard Kyle Macy early in the second quarter with a two-point shot as the Suns' 24th best all-time scorer on December 2, 2014, against the Indiana Pacers. He then surpassed point guard Stephon Marbury with less than a minute left in the second quarter with another two-point shot to become the Suns' 23rd best all-time scorer as he scored 22 points in the first half and a then-season high 34 points in a blowout 117–99 victory over Indiana at the US Airways Center.
- Eric Bledsoe's first ever triple-double against his former team, the Los Angeles Clippers, in overtime on December 8, 2014, was the first time a Suns player recorded a triple-double since Boris Diaw back in April 14, 2006 against the Golden State Warriors.
- Eric's second triple-double of his career on December 23, 2014, against the Dallas Mavericks was also the first time a Suns player had multiple triple-doubles in a season since Boris Diaw when he had four different triple-doubles in the 2005–06 NBA season.
- Goran Dragić tied his former teammate Grant Hill with a two-point shot near the middle of the second quarter and then surpass him with a running lay-up in the middle of the second quarter to become the Suns' 22nd best all-time scorer on December 26, 2014, against the Sacramento Kings. He recorded 16 points as the Suns beat the short-handed Kings 115–106.
- Goran tied point guard and former basketball coach Clem Haskins to become the Suns' 21st best all-time scorer near the end of the fourth quarter by making two free-throws to help the Suns increase their lead over the Los Angeles Lakers. Goran scored 24 points as the Suns decimated the Lakers 116-107 out at the Staples Center on December 28, 2014. He'd then surpass that total on December 30, 2014, with 8 minutes left in the first quarter against the New Orleans Pelicans at the Smoothie King Center in a close loss to them.
- Goran surpassed future Hall of Famer point guard and current Milwaukee Bucks head coach Jason Kidd to become the Suns' 20th best all-time scorer near the beginning of the third quarter with a fast-break layup after a winning jump-ball in the Thunder's side of the field on New Year's Eve. He'd record 21 points in a close overtime loss against the Thunder.
- When Eric Bledsoe had over 1,200 points, 400 rebounds, and 400 assists throughout this season, it made Eric the fifth Suns player to record such totals in a single season, with Jason Kidd (back in the 2000–01 NBA season), Jeff Hornacek (back in the 1991–92 NBA season), Alvan Adams (in his rookie season), and Gail Goodrich (back in the team's inaugural season) being the first to do so earlier.

== Transactions ==
=== Trades ===
July 11, 2014

To Phoenix Suns

(United States) Isaiah Thomas (sign and trade)

To Sacramento Kings

(United States) Alex Oriakhi
$7 Million Traded Player Exception

December 24, 2014

To Phoenix Suns

(United States) Tony Mitchell

To Detroit Pistons

(United States) Anthony Tolliver

January 9, 2015

To Phoenix Suns

(United States) Brandan Wright

To Boston Celtics

2016 second round pick (from Minnesota)
2017 second round pick (from Minnesota)
Traded Player Exception

January 15, 2015
Three–team trade
To Los Angeles Clippers

(United States) Austin Rivers (from Boston)

To Boston Celtics

(United States) Shavlik Randolph (from Phoenix)
(United States) Chris Douglas–Roberts (from L.A. Clippers)
2017 second round pick (from L.A. Clippers)
$2.4 Million Traded Player Exception (from L.A. Clippers)

To Phoenix Suns

(United States) Reggie Bullock (from L.A. Clippers)

February 19, 2015

Seven–team trade
To Phoenix Suns

(United States) Brandon Knight (from Milwaukee)
(United States) Marcus Thornton (from Boston)
(United States) Danny Granger (from Miami)
(United States) John Salmons (from New Orleans)
(United States) Kendall Marshall (from Milwaukee)
2016 first round pick (from Cleveland via Boston)
2018 Top 7 protected first round pick (from Miami)
2021 first round pick (from Miami)
$5.5 Million Traded Player Exception (from Miami)

To Miami Heat

(Socialist Federal Republic of Yugoslavia) / (Slovenia) Goran Dragić (from Phoenix)
(Socialist Federal Republic of Yugoslavia) / (Slovenia) Zoran Dragić (from Phoenix)

To Milwaukee Bucks

(Canada) Tyler Ennis (from Phoenix)
(United States) Miles Plumlee (from Phoenix)
(United States) Michael Carter–Williams (from Philadelphia)

To Boston Celtics

(United States) Isaiah Thomas (from Phoenix)
(Sweden) Jonas Jerebko (from Detroit)
(Italy) Luigi Datome (from Detroit)

To Philadelphia 76ers

2018 first round pick (from L.A. Lakers via Phoenix)

To Detroit Pistons

(United States) Tayshaun Prince (from Boston)

To New Orleans Pelicans

(United States) Norris Cole (from Miami)
(United States) Shawne Williams (from Miami)
(United States) / (Croatia) Justin Hamilton (from Miami)
Cash Considerations (from Miami)

I: The Minnesota Timberwolves were initially going to send their own first round pick (top–12 protected from 2015–2016) to Boston moving forward. However, because Minnesota could not go over their threshold they set themselves up for the Celtics by 2016 (even with two #1 draft picks at their disposal and them both being Rookie of the Year winners), the Timberwolves conveyed their 2016 and 2017 second round draft picks to Boston instead.
II: Even though the Suns initially had the Miami Heat's 2017 (top–7 protected) pick as consideration for what transpired in the trade with the Dragić brothers, Philadelphia wound up with the Heat's 2016 first round pick due to an earlier trade the Heat made with the 76ers during their brief Big Trio era. As a result of the Ted Stepien Rule, the Suns were forbidden from having the Heat's 2017 protected first round pick in the event it fell outside of protection due to the fact that the Heat would be trading two first round draft picks of their own accord in a row to different teams. Because of this fact, Phoenix had to wait until 2018 (where Miami's pick was at #16 that year) before acquiring the first of Miami's two first round selections in exchange.
III: The Los Angeles Lakers initially sent their 2015 first round selection through an earlier trade involving the (at the time) soon-to-be-retired Steve Nash. However, their selection found itself in the top 5 that year and their 2016 and 2017 selections went into the top 3 as the second pick in each draft, so the Lakers sent their own first round pick to Philadelphia completely unprotected in 2018 instead. The selection was ultimately conveyed as a top 10 pick at #10, which resulted in it not being sent down to the Boston Celtics that year via another trade. However, the 76ers traded that selection they acquired from the Suns back to them in exchange for the two Miami Heat selections for 2018 instead of keeping that selection.

=== Free agents ===
==== Additions ====
Player	Signed	Former team
P. J. Tucker	Signed 3-year deal worth $16.5 Million	Phoenix Suns
Isaiah Thomas	Signed 4-year deal worth $27 Million	Sacramento Kings
Anthony Tolliver	Signed 2-year deal worth $6 Million	Charlotte Bobcats / Hornets
Ronald Shavlik Randolph	Signed 1-year deal worth $1.23 Million	Phoenix Suns
Eric Bledsoe	Signed 5-year deal worth $70 Million	Phoenix Suns
Zoran Dragić	Signed 2-year deal worth $4 Million	(Spain) Club Baloncesto Unicaja Málaga, S.A.D.
Markieff Morris	Signed 4-year extension worth $32 Million	Phoenix Suns
Marcus Morris	Signed 4-year extension worth $20 Million	Phoenix Suns
Earl Barron	Signed two 10-day contracts / 1-year deal worth $390,063	New York Knicks / Phoenix Suns / (China) Shanxi Zhongyu Brave Dragons / Bakersfield Jam
Seth Curry	Signed a 10-day contract worth $48,028	Orlando Magic / Erie BayHawks
A.J. Price	Signed a 10-day contract worth $62,552	Cleveland Cavaliers / Indiana Pacers
Jerel McNeal	Signed a 10-day contract / 2-year deal worth $904,745	Bakersfield Jam

a: When Anthony Tolliver first signed up to play for Charlotte, the professional basketball team was known as the Charlotte Bobcats at the time. However, word also quickly spread that after the 2013–14 NBA season (which was also the Bobcats' 10th season in the NBA), they would be renamed to the Charlotte Hornets in order to continue the original team name's legacy from the 1988–89 NBA season to the 2001–02 NBA season before they moved to New Orleans and eventually became the New Orleans Pelicans. Even though Tolliver was on the team when they renamed the Bobcats to the Hornets, he never played for the Hornets and instead played under the old Bobcats moniker.
b: Both Markieff and Marcus Morris noted that they were willing to take discounts on their contracts in order to stay with each other in the future. On September 29, the Morris Twins split the total value among each other in order to sign contracts that allowed themselves to stay in Phoenix together for the long term.
c: The last NBA team Earl Barron played for before first trying his hand out with the Suns during pre-season was the New York Knicks late into the 2012–13 NBA season before deciding not to play at all last season for unknown reasons. While Earl did battle hard to steal a spot from either Shavlik Randolph or Anthony Tolliver during his first visit in the season, he ultimately did not make the initial roster. However, he did originally go to the Suns' D-League affiliate in the Bakersfield Jam as an affiliate player after impressing the Suns during the pre-season. Earl continued playing with the Jam until January 27, 2015, when he was bought out of his contract to play with the Shanxi Zhongyu Brave Dragons in China for the rest of their season. Unfortunately for Earl, Shanxi ended their season before he even got a chance to play with that team, so he ended up going back to Bakersfield on February 18, 2015. He played one more game with the Jam before signing his (first) 10-day contract with the Suns on February and later on sign for the rest of the season on March.
d: The last NBA team Seth Curry had technically played for before signing a deal with the Suns was the Orlando Magic during the pre-season this season. However, after not making it to their roster officially, Seth had played the rest of the season up until March 11, 2015, with the Magic's D-League affiliate, the Erie BayHawks instead. The last official NBA team Seth played for was the Cleveland Cavaliers, but he also spent time with the Santa Cruz Warriors before the end of the 2013–14 NBA season instead. He also played for the Suns during this season's Summer League squad in Las Vegas.
e: A.J. Price had initially started the season playing for the Cleveland Cavaliers around the pre-season, but like Seth Curry with the Orlando Magic, he was waived before the beginning of the season. Price then played for an injury-depleted Indiana Pacers team that was at the time without Paul George and some of their other star players on November 6, 2014 before being waived near the end of the month before returning to Cleveland on November 30, 2014 and remained on their roster until January 7, 2015.
f: The Suns decided to initially sign guard Jerel McNeal to a 10-day contract worth $29,843 on April Fool's Day in 2015 after waiving A.J. Price off of his own 10-day contract. After making his professional debut in the league during that time, the Suns decided to sign him for the rest of the season and potentially go into the 2015–16 season on April 11, 2015. For the remainder of this season, Jerel gained an addition $29,843 (thus giving him a total amount of $59,686 for his time with the Suns this season), while he would have maintained an additional $845,059 for the next season in his contract if he remained on the team before July 21, 2015.

==== Subtractions ====
Player	Reason left	New team
Bogdan Bogdanović	Signed a new contract	(Turkey) Fenerbahçe Ülker
Channing Frye	Unrestricted free agent	Orlando Magic
Alex Oriakhi	Traded under a restricted free agent sign-and-trade	Sacramento Kings / (Lithuania) Pieno Žvaigždės
Ishmael "Ish" Smith	Waived / Free Agent	Houston Rockets / Oklahoma City Thunder / New Orleans Pelicans / Philadelphia 76ers
Dionte Christmas	Waived / Free Agent	New Orleans Pelicans / (France) Paris-Levallois Basket
Leandro Barbosa	Unrestricted free agent	Golden State Warriors
Alec Brown	Signed a new contract	(Spain) Obradoiro Clube de Amigos do Baloncesto / Bakersfield Jam
Chukwuemeka "Emeka" Okafor	Free Agent / Waived	Philadelphia 76ers / Delaware 87ers / New Orleans Pelicans
Anthony Tolliver	Traded	Detroit Pistons
Tony Mitchell	Waived	(Puerto Rico) Atléticos de San Germán
Ronald Shavlik Randolph; Isaiah Thomas	Traded	Boston Celtics
Goran Dragić; Zoran Dragić	Traded	Miami Heat
Miles Plumlee; Tyler Ennis	Traded	Milwaukee Bucks
Kendall Marshall	Waived	Philadelphia 76ers
John Salmons	Waived	—N/a (Retired)
Seth Curry	10 Day Contract Expired	Erie BayHawks
A.J. Price	10 Day Contract Expired	(China) Shanghai Dongfang Sharks

g: Even though both Bogdan Bogdanović and Alec Brown initially had contracts to play in European teams for multiple seasons, both players still have their rights retained by the Suns. On July 6, 2014, Bogdan Bogdanović signed a contract to allow him to stay with the Fenerbahçe Ülker in Turkey for at least two seasons guaranteed. Alec Brown, however, had signed a contract to play for the Obradoiro Clube de Amigos do Baloncesto in Spain for at least one season guaranteed, but he'd never play for the team during this season due to an earlier injury he received during the Summer League and had instead decided to sign with the Suns' D-League affiliate team, the Bakersfield Jam, for the rest of the season starting on February 11, 2015. However, Brown decided to have a second chance to play for the Obradoiro Clube de Amigos do Baloncesto a year later on July 31, 2015.
h: Despite the fact that Alex Oriakhi never played for the Suns, his draft rights were still retained to the point where he even would have played for the Suns' Summer League team this season had he not been traded a day before the Las Vegas Summer League competition began. However, because the Kings had no room to offer him a spot on the team, Oriakhi sign a one-year contract to play with the Pieno Žvaigždės in Lithuania.
i: Ishmael "Ish" Smith and Dionte Christmas were waived from the Houston Rockets and the New Orleans Pelicans' rosters respectively before the regular season began. Dionte signed with Paris-Levallois Basket in France on November 12, 2014, while Ishmeal signed with the Oklahoma City Thunder on November 8, 2014 thanks to their roster being depleted with many injuries around that time (especially with both star players Kevin Durant and Russell Westbrook) before being traded to the New Orleans Pelicans and waived on February 19, 2015 and signing with the Philadelphia 76ers three days later after they waived Malcolm Thomas from their roster.
j: Despite the fact that Chukwuemeka "Emeka" Okafor never played a game for the Suns during the previous season, as well as not play at all since early 2013 back with the Washington Wizards, he'd continue to rehabilitate his body throughout the rest of this season and not play in the process. Okafor was only deemed ready to play NBA basketball again on May 30, 2017, and had finally signed up with a new squad in the Philadelphia 76ers (at least for their training camp) on September 23, 2017. He was cut by Philadelphia on October 14, 2017, before the regular season began that year, but he soon afterwards played for the Delaware 87ers officially that same year in an attempt to get back to an NBA team, which he did on February 3, 2018 with a 10-day contract signed with the New Orleans Pelicans; Okafor signed another 10-day contract on February 13 before signing a one-year deal to remain in New Orleans on February 23, 2018.
k: Even though Tony Mitchell was traded to the Suns on Christmas Eve in exchange for Anthony Tolliver leaving for the Detroit Pistons, Mitchell never played a single NBA game with the team. He was waived on January 9, 2015 after the Suns traded their conditional first round draft pick they received from the Minnesota Timberwolves in 2012 from the three-way trade with Minnesota (which eventually turned into two second round draft picks for 2016 and 2017) and the then-New Orleans Hornets to the Boston Celtics for power forward/center Brandan Wright. Mitchell signed with the Atléticos de San Germán in Puerto Rico for the rest of the 2014–15 season.
l: While both Shavlik Randolph and Isaiah Thomas were traded to the Celtics, they were traded for different reasons. Shavlik was traded as a part of a three-way deal involving the Los Angeles Clippers for the purpose of getting the Clippers' Reggie Bullock, while Isaiah was traded in a seven-way deal involving the Milwaukee Bucks, Miami Heat, New Orleans Pelicans, Philadelphia 76ers, and Detroit Pistons that also involved trading the Dragić brothers, Miles Plumlee, rookie guard Tyler Ennis, and the Los Angeles Lakers' Top-5 protected draft pick this year (Top-3 protected the next two years later) in exchange for Brandon Knight, Marcus Thornton, Danny Granger, Kendall Marshall, John Salmons, the 2016 first round pick Boston got from the Cleveland Cavaliers earlier (which turned out to be Skal Labissière), and two future first-round draft picks from the Miami Heat (one of which was completely unprotected).
m: Initially, both Randolph and Thomas stayed with the team throughout most of the season after their respective trades came up. However, Shavlik Randolph was waived on April 6, 2015, and signed with the Denver Nuggets two days later, but never played any games with them and was waived on April 9, 2015, one day after he signed the contract with Denver.
n: While both of the Dragić brothers played out the rest of this season with the Miami Heat, Zoran played some of his games with the Heat's D-League affiliate team, the Sioux Falls Skyforce, instead of with his older brother, Goran, at Miami.
o: Even though both Kendall Marshall and John Salmons were traded (back) to the Suns on the February 19, 2015 trade deadline alongside Kendall's former Bucks teammate Brandon Knight, Marcus Thornton from the Boston Celtics, and Danny Granger from the Miami Heat (and three future first round draft picks), Marshall never suited up under his second chance with the Suns in his career (as did Salmons), as they were both waived from the team on the same day, thanks (in part) due to Marshall's anterior cruciate ligament injury he sustained with the Bucks earlier in his career. Marshall signed a multi-year deal for the Philadelphia 76ers on September 13, 2015, while Salmons ultimately retired before the start of the 2018–19 season due to him being of older age than where he was at during this season.
p: After being waived from the Suns once completing his 10-day contract with the team, A.J. Price did not find a new team to play under until September 11, 2015, when he signed a one-year deal to play for the Shanghai Dongfang Sharks of the Chinese Basketball Association.
