= 2011–12 North Carolina Tar Heels men's basketball team =

American college basketball season

2011–12 North Carolina Tar Heels men's basketball

ACC Regular Season Champions

NCAA tournament, Elite Eight
- Conference: Atlantic Coast Conference

Ranking
- Coaches: No. 6
- AP: No. 4
- Record: 32–6 (14–2 ACC)
- Head coach: Roy Williams (9th season)
- Assistant coaches: Steve Robinson (9th season); Jerod Haase (9th season); C. B. McGrath (9th season)
- Home arena: Dean E. Smith Center

2011–12 ACC men's basketball standings
	Conf.				Overall
Team	W		L	PCT	W		L	PCT
No. 6 North Carolina	14	–	2	.875	32	–	6	.842
No. 14 Duke	13	–	3	.813	27	–	7	.794
No. 15 Florida State†	12	–	4	.750	25	–	10	.714
Virginia	9	–	7	.563	22	–	10	.688
No. 20 NC State	9	–	7	.563	24	–	13	.649
Miami (FL)	9	–	7	.563	20	–	13	.606
Clemson	8	–	8	.500	16	–	15	.516
Maryland	6	–	10	.375	17	–	15	.531
Virginia Tech	4	–	12	.250	16	–	17	.485
Wake Forest	4	–	12	.250	13	–	18	.419
Georgia Tech	4	–	12	.250	11	–	20	.355
Boston College	4	–	12	.250	9	–	22	.290
† 2012 ACC tournament winner As of April 3, 2012; Rankings from Coaches Poll

The 2011–12 North Carolina Tar Heels men's basketball team represented the University of North Carolina at Chapel Hill in the 2011–2012 college basketball season. The team's head coach was Roy Williams, who was in his 9th season as UNC's head men's basketball coach. The 2011–12 North Carolina team finished the regular season with a final record of 32–6, and with a 14–2 record in ACC regular season play, winning the conference regular season championship outright. They were invited to the 2012 ACC men's basketball tournament, where they beat Maryland and North Carolina State before falling to Florida State in the championship game.

They were also invited to the 2012 NCAA Division I men's basketball tournament reaching the Elite Eight where they were defeated by Kansas. This was the second time UNC lost to Kansas in the NCAA Tournament with Roy Williams as UNC head coach. Roy Williams previously coached Kansas from 1988–2003. Kansas later fell to Kentucky 59–67 in the National Championship Game. The Tar Heels won their previous three games in the NCAA Tournament by an average of 13.7 points. In the second-round game versus Creighton, starting UNC point guard Kendall Marshall broke his right wrist with 10:56 remaining in the second half. Kendall Marshall did not play in UNC's two following games in the NCAA Tournament, a 73–65 overtime win over Ohio in the Sweet 16 and a 80–67 loss to Kansas in the Elite Eight. The loss to Kansas was UNC's second straight loss in the Elite Eight, after losing to Kentucky the year before.

== Pre-season ==
=== Departures ===
Name	Number	Pos.	Height	Weight	Year	Hometown	Notes
Justin Knox	25	F	6'9"	240	Senior	Tuscaloosa, Alabama	Graduated
Daniel Bolick	3	G	5'10"	175	Senior	Carrboro, North Carolina	Graduated
Van Hatchell	13	G	6'4"	185	Senior	Chapel Hill, North Carolina	Graduated

=== Class of 2011 Signees ===
College recruiting
Name	Hometown	School	Height	Weight	Commit date
James Michael McAdoo; F	Norfolk, Virginia	Norfolk Christian High School	6 ft 8 in (2.03 m)	216 lb (98 kg)	Nov 10, 2010
James Michael McAdoo; F	Recruit ratings: Scout: Rivals: ESPN: (98)				
P. J. Hairston; G	Greensboro, North Carolina	Hargrave Military Academy	6 ft 5 in (1.96 m)	220 lb (100 kg)	Nov 10, 2010
P. J. Hairston; G	Recruit ratings: Scout: Rivals: ESPN: (97)				
Desmond Hubert; C	Cream Ridge, New Jersey	New Egypt High School	6 ft 9 in (2.06 m)	207 lb (94 kg)	Apr 14, 2011
Desmond Hubert; C	Recruit ratings: Scout: Rivals: ESPN: (90)				
Jackson Simmons; F	Sylva, North Carolina	Smoky Mountain High School	6 ft 8 in (2.03 m)	200 lb (91 kg)	Aug 17, 2010
Jackson Simmons; F	Recruit ratings: Scout: Rivals: ESPN: (89)				
Stilman White; G	Wilmington, North Carolina	John T. Hoggard High School	6 ft 0 in (1.83 m)	170 lb (77 kg)	Apr 14, 2011
Stilman White; G	Recruit ratings: Scout: Rivals: ESPN: (78)				
Overall recruit ranking: Scout: 9 Rivals: 6 ESPN: 5
Note: In many cases, Scout, Rivals, 247Sports, On3, and ESPN may conflict in their listings of height and weight.; In these cases, the average was taken. ESPN grades are on a 100-point scale.; Sources: "North Carolina 2011 Basketball Commitments". Rivals.; "2011 North Carolina Commits". Scout.; "ESPN". ESPN.; "Scout.com Team Recruiting Rankings". Scout.; "2011 Team Ranking". Rivals.

== Roster ==
2011–12 North Carolina Tar Heels men's basketball team
Players
Coaches

Pos.	#	Name	Height	Weight	Year	Previous school	Hometown
G	1	Dexter Strickland (injured) (C)	6 ft 3 in (1.91 m)	180 lb (82 kg)	Jr	St. Patrick H.S.	Rahway, NJ
G	2	Leslie McDonald (injured) (redshirt)	6 ft 4 in (1.93 m)	215 lb (98 kg)	Jr	Briarcrest Christian School	Memphis, TN
G	4	Luke Davis (I) (redshirt)	6 ft 0 in (1.83 m)	165 lb (75 kg)	So	Ravenscroft School	Raleigh, NC
G	5	Kendall Marshall	6 ft 3 in (1.91 m)	186 lb (84 kg)	So	Bishop O'Connell H.S.	Dumfries, VA
G	11	Stilman White	6 ft 0 in (1.83 m)	170 lb (77 kg)	Fr	Hoggard H.S.	Wilmington, NC
F	14	Desmond Hubert	6 ft 10 in (2.08 m)	205 lb (93 kg)	Fr	New Egypt H.S.	Cream Ridge, NJ
G	15	P. J. Hairston	6 ft 6 in (1.98 m)	217 lb (98 kg)	Fr	Hargrave Military Academy	Greensboro, NC
F	21	Jackson Simmons	6 ft 7 in (2.01 m)	212 lb (96 kg)	Fr	Smoky Mountain H.S.	Sylva, NC
G	22	David Dupont (W)	6 ft 5 in (1.96 m)	195 lb (88 kg)	Sr	Grimsley H.S.	Greensboro, NC
G	24	Justin Watts	6 ft 4 in (1.93 m)	210 lb (95 kg)	Sr	Jordan H.S.	Durham, NC
G	30	Patrick Crouch (W)	5 ft 11 in (1.8 m)	175 lb (79 kg)	Sr	T.C. Roberson H.S.	Asheville, NC
F	31	John Henson	6 ft 10 in (2.08 m)	220 lb (100 kg)	Jr	Sickles H.S.	Tampa, FL
G	34	Stewart Cooper (W)	6 ft 5 in (1.96 m)	205 lb (93 kg)	Sr	Forsyth Country Day	Winston-Salem, NC
G	35	Reggie Bullock	6 ft 7 in (2.01 m)	200 lb (91 kg)	So	Kinston H.S.	Kinston, NC
F	40	Harrison Barnes	6 ft 8 in (2.03 m)	210 lb (95 kg)	So	Ames H.S.	Ames, IA
F	43	James Michael McAdoo	6 ft 9 in (2.06 m)	228 lb (103 kg)	Fr	Norfolk Christian H.S.	Norfolk, VA
C	44	Tyler Zeller	7 ft 0 in (2.13 m)	250 lb (113 kg)	Sr	Washington H.S.	Washington, IN

Head coach

- Roy Williams (North Carolina)

Assistant coach(es)

- Steve Robinson (Radford)
- Jerod Haase (Kansas)
- C. B. McGrath (Kansas)

Legend

- (C) Team captain
- (S) Suspended
- (I) Ineligible
- (W) Walk-on
- Injured
- Current redshirt

Roster
Last update: 2012-07-14

- Note that the roster is subject to change.

== Season ==
=== Non-conference play ===
The Tar Heels started out as a near-unanimous #1 in all major polls. They opened the season against Michigan State in the inaugural Carrier Classic, which they won handily 67–55. They were not seriously tested until the finals of the 2011 Las Vegas Invitational, in which they were upset by UNLV 90–80. After a close win over Wisconsin and an equally close loss to Kentucky, they made it relatively unscathed through the rest of the nonconference slate, with the only close game being against Long Beach State.

=== Conference play ===
The ACC schedule opened with dominating wins over Boston College and Miami. However, in their third conference game, the Tar Heels suffered a 90–57 flogging at the hands of Florida State — easily the worst loss Williams had suffered in his nine years in Chapel Hill. They quickly rebounded and won their next five games with relative ease. They were well on their way to making Duke their sixth straight victim, but Duke came back from 10 points down with two minutes to go to win the game on an Austin Rivers 3-pointer at the buzzer.

The Tar Heels would not lose again for the rest of the season, though they got a scare from Virginia before hanging on for a 54–51 win. An easy win over Maryland set up the seventh winner-take-all game in the 93-year history of the Carolina-Duke rivalry, with the winner clinching the ACC regular-season title and the number-one seed in the 2012 ACC tournament. The Tar Heels dominated from start to finish, leading by as much as 26 before going on to an 88–70 win—in the process, winning their 29th ACC regular season title and their fifth outright title in eight years.

== Schedule ==
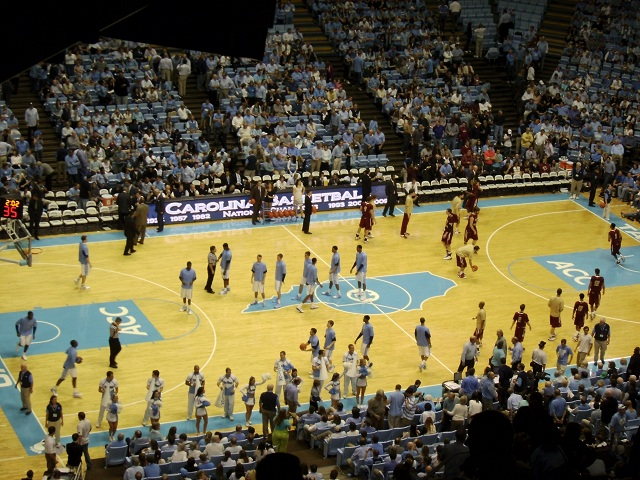
The Tar Heels return to the court after halftime of the game against Boston College.

Date time, TV	Rank^{#}	Opponent^{#}	Result	Record	High points	High rebounds	High assists	Site (attendance) city, state
Exhibition
October 28, 2011*; 7:30 pm	No. 1	UNC Pembroke	W 100–58	–	18 – Zeller	11 – Zeller	5 – Bullock	Smith Center (16,852 (77.5%)); Chapel Hill, NC
Regular season
November 11, 2011*; 7:00 pm, ESPN	No. 1	vs. Michigan State; Carrier Classic	W 67–55	1–0	17 – Barnes	7 – Henson	5 – Marshall; Strickland	USS Carl Vinson (8,111 (100%)); San Diego, CA
November 13, 2011*; 4:00 pm, ESPNU	No. 1	at UNC Asheville	W 91–75	2–0	27 – Zeller	12 – Henson	15 – Marshall	Kimmel Arena (3,280 (96.5%)); Asheville, NC
November 20, 2011*; 2:00 pm, FSN	No. 1	Mississippi Valley State; 2011 Las Vegas Invitational	W 101–75	3–0	18 – Barnes; Henson	14 – Henson	8 – Marshall	Smith Center (18,160 (83.5%)); Chapel Hill, NC
November 22, 2011*; 7:30 pm, ESPN3	No. 1	Tennessee State; Las Vegas Invitational	W 102–69	4–0	23 – Bullock	10 – Henson	15 – Marshall	Smith Center (17,509 (80.5%)); Chapel Hill, NC
November 25, 2011*; 10:00 pm, ESPN2	No. 1	vs. South Carolina; Las Vegas Invitational semifinals	W 87–62	5–0	21 – Barnes	8 – Henson	14 – Marshall	Orleans Arena (unavailable); Paradise, NV
November 26, 2011*; 10:30 pm, ESPN2	No. 1	vs. UNLV; Las Vegas Invitational championship	L 80–90	5–1	15 – Barnes; Hairston	8 – Henson	8 – Marshall	Orleans Arena (7,523 (100%)); Paradise, NV
November 30, 2011*; 9:30 pm, ESPN	No. 5	No. 9 Wisconsin; ACC – Big Ten Challenge	W 60–57	6–1	20 – Barnes	21 – Henson	7 – Marshall	Smith Center (21,750 (100%)); Chapel Hill, NC
December 3, 2011*; 12:00 pm, CBS	No. 5	at No. 1 Kentucky	L 72–73	6–2	14 – Barnes; Zeller	8 – Hensen; Zeller	8 – Marshall	Rupp Arena (24,398 (100%)); Lexington, KY
December 6, 2011*; 7:00 pm, ESPNU	No. 4	Evansville	W 97–48	7–2	17 – Barnes	12 – Henson	6 – Marshall	Smith Center (15,623 (71.8%)); Chapel Hill, NC
December 10, 2011*; 7:00 pm, ESPN3	No. 4	Long Beach State	W 84–78	8–2	24 – Henson	10 – Henson	16 – Marshall	Smith Center (20,426 (93.9%)); Chapel Hill, NC
December 17, 2011*; 6:00 pm, ESPNU	No. 5	Appalachian State	W 97–82	9–2	31 – Zeller	10 – Zeller	13 – Marshall	Smith Center (20,892 (96.1%)); Chapel Hill, NC
December 19, 2011*; 7:00 pm, ESPNU	No. 5	Nicholls State	W 99–49	10–2	14 – McAdoo; Strickland	11 – Henson; Zeller	7 – Marshall	Smith Center (18,072 (83.1%)); Chapel Hill, NC
December 21, 2011*; 7:00 pm, ESPN2	No. 5	Texas	W 82–63	11–2	26 – Barnes	11 – Zeller	9 – Marshall	Smith Center (21,750 (100%)); Chapel Hill, NC
December 29, 2011*; 7:00 pm, ESPN2	No. 5	Elon	W 100–62	12–2	19 – Zeller	13 – Zeller	8 – Marshall	Smith Center (20,880 (96%)); Chapel Hill, NC
January 1, 2012*; 3:00 pm, ESPNU	No. 5	Monmouth	W 102–65	13–2	21 – Henson	11 – Zeller	11 – Marshall	Smith Center (18,614 (85.6%)); Chapel Hill, NC
January 7, 2012; 2:30 pm, ACC Network	No. 3	Boston College	W 83–60	14–2 (1–0)	25 – Barnes	8 – Henson; Zeller	11 – Marshall	Smith Center (20,582 (94.6%)); Chapel Hill, NC
January 10, 2012; 9:00 pm, ACC Network	No. 3	Miami (FL)	W 73–56	15–2 (2–0)	16 – Zeller	14 – Henson	7 – Marshall	Smith Center (20,096 (92.4%)); Chapel Hill, NC
January 14, 2012; 2:00 pm, ESPN	No. 3	at Florida State; ESPN College GameDay	L 57–90	15–3 (2–1)	15 – Barnes	14 – Zeller	4 – Marshall	Donald L. Tucker Center (12,100 (100%)); Tallahassee, FL
January 19, 2012; 9:00 pm, ESPN	No. 8	at Virginia Tech	W 82–68	16–3 (3–1)	27 – Barnes	16 – Henson	8 – Marshall	Cassell Coliseum (9,847 (100%)); Blacksburg, VA
January 26, 2012; 7:00 pm, ESPN	No. 7	NC State; Carolina-State Rivalry, Homecoming	W 74–55	17–3 (4–1)	21 – Zeller	17 – Zeller	11 – Marshall	Smith Center (21,750 (100%)); Chapel Hill, NC
January 29, 2012; 6:00 pm, ESPNU	No. 7	Georgia Tech	W 93–81	18–3 (5–1)	23 – Barnes	6 – Henson; McAdoo	12 – Marshall	Smith Center (21,017 (96.6%)); Chapel Hill, NC
January 31, 2012; 9:00 pm, ESPNU	No. 5	at Wake Forest	W 68–53	19–3 (6–1)	18 – Zeller	18 – Zeller	6 – Marshall	LJVM Coliseum (12,865 (87.7%)); Winston-Salem, NC
February 4, 2012; 4:00 pm, ESPN	No. 5	at Maryland	W 83–74	20–3 (7–1)	22 – Zeller	12 – Henson	16 – Marshall	Comcast Center (17,950 (100%)); College Park, MD
February 8, 2012; 9:00 pm, ESPN	No. 5	No. 9 Duke; Carolina-Duke rivalry	L 84–85	20–4 (7–2)	25 – Barnes	17 – Henson	8 – Marshall	Smith Center (21,750 (100%)); Chapel Hill, NC
February 11, 2012; 1:00 pm, ACC Network	No. 5	No. 19 Virginia	W 70–52	21–4 (8–2)	25 – Zeller	11 – Barnes	6 – Marshall	Smith Center (20,496 (94.2%)); Chapel Hill, NC
February 15, 2012; 7:00 pm, ESPN	No. 8	at Miami (FL)	W 73–64	22–4 (9–2)	23 – Barnes	11 – Henson	9 – Marshall	BankUnited Center (7,071 (88.3%)); Coral Gables, FL
February 18, 2012; 4:00 pm, ESPN	No. 8	Clemson	W 74–52	23–4 (10–2)	24 – Barnes	8 – Henson	13 – Marshall	Smith Center (21,750 (100%)); Chapel Hill, NC
February 21, 2012; 8:00 pm, ACC Network	No. 7	at NC State; Carolina-State Rivalry	W 86–74	24–4 (11–2)	22 – Marshall	13 – Henson	13 – Marshall	RBC Center (19,710 (99.9%)); Raleigh, NC
February 25, 2012; 4:00 pm, ESPN	No. 7	at No. 25 Virginia	W 54–51	25–4 (12–2)	20 – Zeller	11 – Henson	6 – Marshall	John Paul Jones Arena (14,273 (97.8%)); Charlottesville, VA
February 29, 2012; 7:00 pm, ESPN	No. 6	Maryland	W 88–64	26–4 (13–2)	30 – Zeller	9 – Henson	8 – Marshall	Smith Center (21,750 (100%)); Chapel Hill, NC
March 3, 2012; 7:00 pm, ESPN	No. 6	at No. 3 Duke; Carolina-Duke Rivalry, ESPN College GameDay	W 88–70	27–4 (14–2)	20 – Marshall	10 – Henson; Zeller	10 – Marshall	Cameron Indoor Stadium (9,314 (100%)); Durham, NC
ACC tournament
March 9, 2012; Noon, ESPN2/ACC Network	(1) No. 4	vs. (8) Maryland; Quarterfinals	W 85–69	28–4	15 – Barnes; Bullock	8 – McAdoo	12 – Marshall	Philips Arena (19,520 (100%)); Atlanta, GA
March 10, 2012; 1:00 pm, ESPN/ACC Network	(1) No. 4	vs. (5) NC State; Semifinals	W 69–67	29–4	23 – Zeller	9 – Zeller	10 – Marshall	Philips Arena (19,520 (100%)); Atlanta, GA
March 11, 2012; 1:00 pm, ESPN/ACC Network	(1) No. 4	vs. (3) No. 17 Florida State; Championship Game	L 82–85	29–5	21 – Barnes	12 – Zeller	9 – Marshall	Philips Arena (19,520 (100%)); Atlanta, GA
NCAA tournament
March 16, 2012*; 4:10 pm, TBS	(1 MW) No. 4	vs. (16 MW) Vermont; Second Round	W 77–58	30–5	17 – McAdoo; Zeller	15 – Zeller	10 – Marshall	Greensboro Coliseum (16,422); Greensboro, NC
March 18, 2012*; 5:15 pm, CBS	(1 MW) No. 4	vs. (8 MW) No. 19 Creighton; Third Round	W 87–73	31–5	18 – Marshall	10 – Henson	11 – Marshall	Greensboro Coliseum (18,722); Greensboro, NC
March 23, 2012*; 7:47 pm, TBS	(1 MW) No. 4	vs. (13 MW) Ohio; Sweet Sixteen	W 73–65 ^{OT}	32–5	20 – Zeller	22 – Zeller	6 – White	Edward Jones Dome (21,471); St. Louis, MO
March 25, 2012*; 5:05 pm, CBS	(1 MW) No. 4	vs. (2 MW) No. 6 Kansas; Elite Eight	L 67–80	32–6	15 – McAdoo	7 – Bullock	7 – White	Edward Jones Dome (23,565); St. Louis, MO
*Non-conference game. ^{#}Rankings from AP Poll. (#) Tournament seedings in parentheses. All times are in Eastern Time (#) during NCAA Tournament is seed with Region.

== Rankings ==
Ranking movements Legend: ██ Increase in ranking ██ Decrease in ranking
	Week																			
Poll	Pre	1	2	3	4	5	6	7	8	9	10	11	12	13	14	15	16	17	18	Final
AP	1	1	1	5	4	5	5	5	3	3	8	7	5	5	8	7	6	4	4	
Coaches	1	1	1	5	6	6	6	6	4	3	8	8	6	5	7	7	6	4	5	

== Team players drafted into the NBA ==
Year	Round	Pick	Player	NBA club
2012	1	7	Harrison Barnes	Golden State Warriors
2012	1	13	Kendall Marshall	Phoenix Suns
2012	1	14	John Henson	Milwaukee Bucks
2012	1	17	Tyler Zeller	Cleveland Cavaliers
2013	1	25	Reggie Bullock	Los Angeles Clippers
2014	1	26	P.J. Hairston	Miami Heat
