= Carrier Classic =

U.S. Navy aircraft carrier basketball

- Logo of the Carrier Classic
- Sport: College Basketball
- Founded: 2011
- No. of teams: Various
- Country: United States
- Venues: USS Carl Vinson, USS Yorktown, USS Bataan, USS Midway
- Most recent champions: Syracuse Orange men's basketball, Notre Dame women
- Most titles: None
- Broadcasters: ESPN, NBC Sports
- Sponsors: Quicken Loans (2011), Walmart (2012)

The Carrier Classic was a series of college basketball games that were played on the deck of a U. S. Navy aircraft carrier. The first game was held on November 11, 2011, aboard USS Carl Vinson, between Michigan State and North Carolina. President Barack Obama attended this game. In 2012, the similar Armed Forces Classic was established.

== Games ==
=== 2011 ===
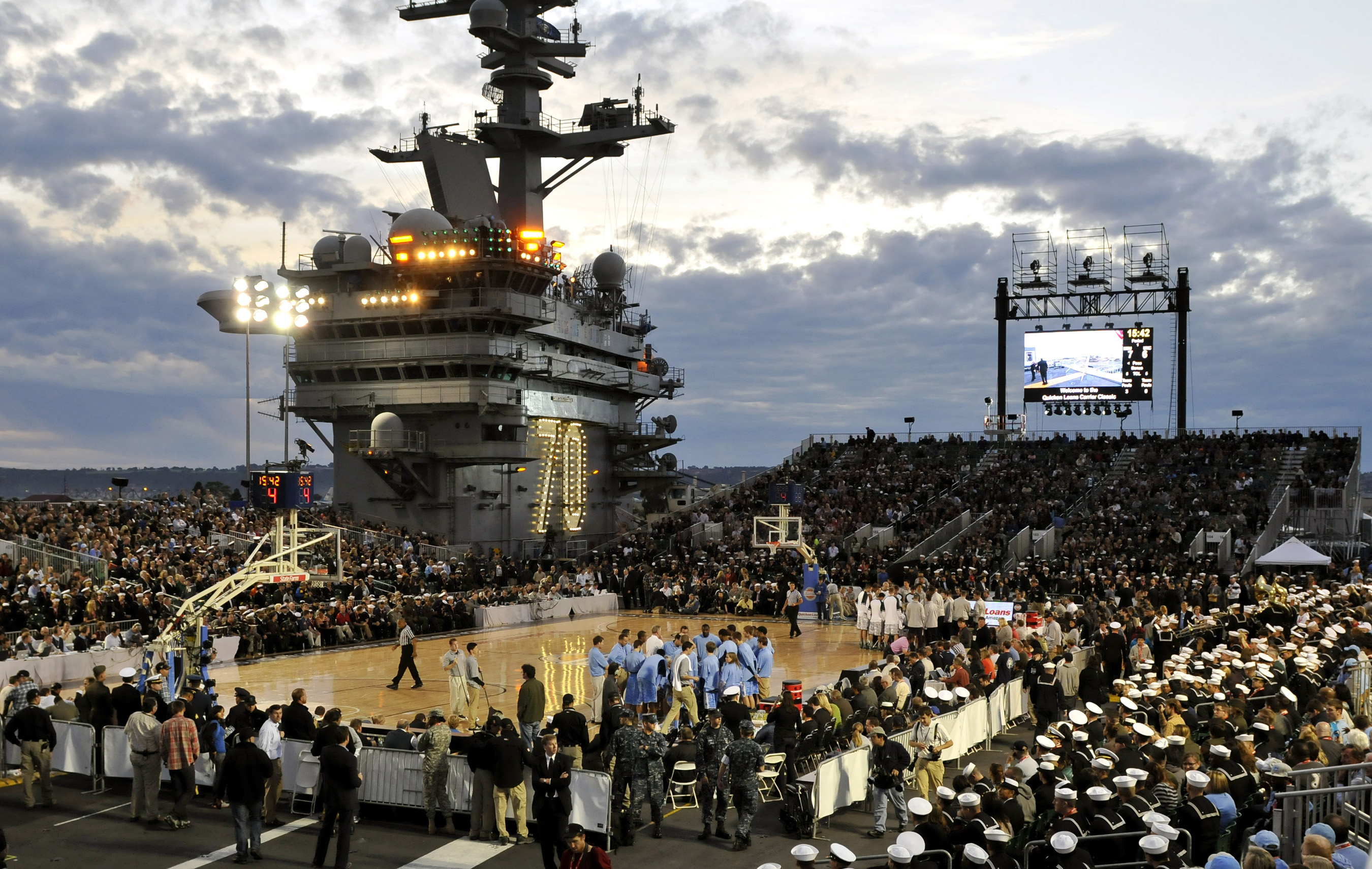
The North Carolina Tar Heels and Michigan State Spartans await the tipoff of the 2011 Carrier Classic on the flight deck of USS Carl Vinson.

The inaugural Carrier Classic was played on Veterans Day, November 11, 2011. The North Carolina Tar Heels defeated the Michigan State Spartans, 67–55, before 8,111 fans which included members of the military, President Barack Obama and his family. Harrison Barnes was the top scorer for North Carolina with 17 points, while John Henson added 12 points. Branden Dawson and Adreian Payne each scored 10 points for Michigan State. The teams wore a special camouflage pattern on their uniforms. During the first half, the game was paused while sailors on board Carl Vinson conducted the evening retiring of colors at sunset.

Temporary seating was built directly on the flight deck, in addition to the court and lighting. A duplicate setup was built in the hangar bay in case of inclement weather but was not needed.

=== 2012 ===
The 2012 Carrier Classic was scheduled for November 9, 2012, on board USS Yorktown in Charleston Harbor, South Carolina. It was supposed to be a double header, with one game featuring the women's teams of Notre Dame and Ohio State, and the other game featuring the men's teams of Marquette and Ohio State.

Proceeds benefited charitable organizations including the Wounded Warrior Project, and tickets were available for veterans and members of the armed forces, as well as for sale to the public.

The 2012 Carrier Classic between Marquette and Ohio State was cancelled due to condensation on the court, an issue which was not present during the earlier Ohio State–Notre Dame game. The other men's game that day, between Florida and Georgetown, was started and played through the first half, with the Gators leading the Hoyas 27–23. However, the same condensation issue arose, and the second half was not played, with the game later cancelled and all stats accumulated during the game erased.

== Scores ==
Carrier Classic
Date	Carrier	Location	Winner	Score	Loser	Score	Attendance
November 11, 2011	USS Carl Vinson	San Diego, California	North Carolina	67	Michigan State	55	8,111
November 9, 2012	USS Yorktown	Charleston, South Carolina	Notre Dame women	57	Ohio State women	51	
November 9, 2012	USS Yorktown	Charleston, South Carolina	Ohio State vs. Marquette (cancelled)				
November 9, 2012	USS Bataan	Jacksonville, Florida	Georgetown vs. Florida (cancelled)				
November 11, 2012	USS Midway	San Diego, California	Syracuse	62	San Diego State	49	5,119
November 11, 2022	USS Abraham Lincoln	San Diego, California	Gonzaga	64	Michigan State	63	3,572
