= 2016–17 Wisconsin Badgers men's basketball team =

American college basketball season

2016–17 Wisconsin Badgers men's basketball

NCAA tournament, Sweet Sixteen
- Conference: Big Ten Conference

Ranking
- Coaches: No. 16
- AP: No. 25
- Record: 27–10 (12–6 Big Ten)
- Head coach: Greg Gard (2nd season)
- Associate head coach: Lamont Paris
- Assistant coaches: Howard Moore; Joe Krabbenhoft
- Home arena: Kohl Center

2016–17 Big Ten Conference men's basketball standings
	Conf.				Overall
Team	W		L	PCT	W		L	PCT
No. 15 Purdue	14	–	4	.778	27	–	8	.771
No. 25 Wisconsin	12	–	6	.667	27	–	10	.730
Maryland	12	–	6	.667	24	–	9	.727
Minnesota	11	–	7	.611	24	–	10	.706
No. 23 Michigan †	10	–	8	.556	26	–	12	.684
Northwestern	10	–	8	.556	24	–	12	.667
Michigan State	10	–	8	.556	20	–	15	.571
Iowa	10	–	8	.556	19	–	15	.559
Illinois	8	–	10	.444	20	–	15	.571
Ohio State	7	–	11	.389	17	–	15	.531
Indiana	7	–	11	.389	18	–	16	.529
Penn State	6	–	12	.333	15	–	18	.455
Nebraska	6	–	12	.333	12	–	19	.387
Rutgers	3	–	15	.167	15	–	18	.455
† 2017 Big Ten tournament winner Rankings from AP poll

The 2016–17 Wisconsin Badgers men's basketball team represented the University of Wisconsin–Madison in the 2016–17 NCAA Division I men's basketball season. The Badgers were led by second-year head coach Greg Gard and played their home games at the Kohl Center as members of the Big Ten Conference. They finished the season 27–10, 12–6 in Big Ten play to finish in a tie for second place. Wisconsin defeated Indiana and Northwestern in the Big Ten tournament, but lost to Michigan in the championship game. The team received an at-large bid to the NCAA tournament, its 19th consecutive trip to the NCAA Tournament, as a No. 8 seed in the East region. The Badgers defeated Virginia Tech in the First Round and upset No. 1 overall seed and defending National Champion Villanova to advance to the Sweet Sixteen for the fourth consecutive year. In the Sweet Sixteen, they lost to 20th-ranked Florida on a last second 3.

== Previous season ==
The Badgers finished the 2015–16 season with a record of 22–13, 12–6 in Big Ten play to finish in a four-way tie for third place in conference. They were upset by Nebraska in the second round of the Big Ten tournament. They received an at-large bid to the NCAA tournament as a No. 7 seed, their 18th straight appearance in the Tournament. They defeated Pittsburgh and Xavier to advance to the Sweet Sixteen for the third consecutive year. In the Sweet Sixteen, they lost to Notre Dame.

== Departures ==
Name	Number	Pos.	Height	Weight	Year	Hometown	Notes
Will Decorah	0	G	6'4"	205	Junior	Waunakee, WI	Walk-on; didn't return
Jordan Smith	2	G	6'3"	181	RS Senior	Orono, MN	Walk-on; graduated
Jackson Bax	13	G	5'11"	157	Freshman	Frankfort, IL	Walk-on; didn't return

== 2016 Commitments ==
College recruiting information
Name	Hometown	School	Height	Weight	Commit date
D'Mitrik Trice; PG	Huber Heights, OH	IMG Academy	5 ft 11 in (1.80 m)	165 lb (75 kg)	Apr 23, 2016
D'Mitrik Trice; PG	Recruit ratings: Scout: Rivals: 247Sports: ESPN:				
Aleem Ford; PF	Lawrenceville, GA	IMG Academy	6 ft 7 in (2.01 m)	195 lb (88 kg)	Apr 23, 2016
Aleem Ford; PF	Recruit ratings: Scout: Rivals: 247Sports: ESPN:				
Overall recruit ranking:
Note: In many cases, Scout, Rivals, 247Sports, On3, and ESPN may conflict in their listings of height and weight.; In these cases, the average was taken. ESPN grades are on a 100-point scale.; Sources: "2016 Wisconsin Commitments". Rivals.; "Men's Basketball Recruiting". Scout.; "ESPN- Wisconsin Badgers Men's Basketball Recruiting". ESPN.; "Scout.com Team Recruiting Rankings". Scout.; "2016 Team Ranking". Rivals.

=== 2017 Commitments ===
College recruiting information (2017)
Name	Hometown	School	Height	Weight	Commit date
Kobe King; PG	La Crosse, WI	La Crosse Central High School	6 ft 2 in (1.88 m)	160 lb (73 kg)	Sep 16, 2015
Kobe King; PG	Recruit ratings: Scout: Rivals: 247Sports: ESPN:				
Nate Reuvers; PF	Lakeville, MN	Lakeville North High School	6 ft 10 in (2.08 m)	220 lb (100 kg)	May 18, 2016
Nate Reuvers; PF	Recruit ratings: Scout: Rivals: 247Sports: ESPN:				
Brad Davison; PG	Osseo, MN	Maple Grove High School	6 ft 3 in (1.91 m)	190 lb (86 kg)	Jul 11, 2016
Brad Davison; PG	Recruit ratings: Scout: Rivals: 247Sports: ESPN:				
Overall recruit ranking:
Note: In many cases, Scout, Rivals, 247Sports, On3, and ESPN may conflict in their listings of height and weight.; In these cases, the average was taken. ESPN grades are on a 100-point scale.; Sources: "2017 Wisconsin Commitments". Rivals.; "Men's Basketball Recruiting". Scout.; "ESPN- Wisconsin Badgers Men's Basketball Recruiting". ESPN.; "Scout.com Team Recruiting Rankings". Scout.; "2017 Team Ranking". Rivals.

=== 2018 Commitments ===
College recruiting information (2018)
Name	Hometown	School	Height	Weight	Commit date
Taylor Currie; C	Clarkston, MI	Clarkston High School	6 ft 8 in (2.03 m)	200 lb (91 kg)	Oct 31, 2017
Taylor Currie; C	Recruit ratings: Scout: Rivals: 247Sports: ESPN:				
Tai Stickland; PG	Saint Petersburg, FL	St. Petersburg High School	6 ft 2 in (1.88 m)	180 lb (82 kg)	Mar 27, 2018
Tai Stickland; PG	Recruit ratings: Scout: Rivals: 247Sports: ESPN:				
Joe Hedstrom; C	Hopkins, MN	Hopkins High School	6 ft 10 in (2.08 m)	200 lb (91 kg)	Oct 11, 2017
Joe Hedstrom; C	Recruit ratings: Scout: Rivals: 247Sports: ESPN:				
Overall recruit ranking: Scout: NR Rivals: NR ESPN: NR
Note: In many cases, Scout, Rivals, 247Sports, On3, and ESPN may conflict in their listings of height and weight.; In these cases, the average was taken. ESPN grades are on a 100-point scale.; Sources:

== Roster ==
2016–17 Wisconsin Badgers men's basketball team
Players
Coaches

Pos.	#	Name	Height	Weight	Year	Previous school	Hometown
G	0	D'Mitrik Trice	6 ft 0 in (1.83 m)	178 lb (81 kg)	Fr	Wayne High School (OH)	Huber Heights, Ohio
G	1	Brevin Pritzl	6 ft 3 in (1.91 m)	195 lb (88 kg)	RS Fr	De Pere High School	De Pere, Wisconsin
F	2	Aleem Ford (redshirt)	6 ft 8 in (2.03 m)	208 lb (94 kg)	Fr	Archer High School	Lawrenceville, Georgia
G	3	Zak Showalter	6 ft 3 in (1.91 m)	185 lb (84 kg)	RS Sr	Germantown High School (WI)	Germantown, Wisconsin
G	4	Matt Ferris (W)	6 ft 6 in (1.98 m)	200 lb (91 kg)	RS So	Xavier High School (WI)	Appleton, Wisconsin
F	5	Aaron Moesch (W)	6 ft 8 in (2.03 m)	226 lb (103 kg)	RS Jr	Green Bay Southwest High School	Green Bay, Wisconsin
F	10	Nigel Hayes	6 ft 8 in (2.03 m)	240 lb (109 kg)	Sr	Whitmer High School	Toledo, Ohio
G	11	Jordan Hill	6 ft 4 in (1.93 m)	172 lb (78 kg)	RS Jr	La Salle High School (CA)	Pasadena, California
F	15	Charles Thomas IV	6 ft 8 in (2.03 m)	252 lb (114 kg)	So	River Hill High School	Highland, Maryland
G	20	T. J. Schlundt (W)	6 ft 5 in (1.96 m)	191 lb (87 kg)	RS So	St. John's Northwestern Military Academy	Oconomowoc, Wisconsin
G/F	21	Khalil Iverson	6 ft 5 in (1.96 m)	212 lb (96 kg)	So	Rutherford B. Hayes High School (OH)	Delaware, Ohio
F	22	Ethan Happ	6 ft 10 in (2.08 m)	232 lb (105 kg)	RS So	Rockridge High School	Milan, Illinois
G	24	Bronson Koenig	6 ft 3 in (1.91 m)	190 lb (86 kg)	Sr	Aquinas High School (WI)	La Crosse, Wisconsin
F	25	Alex Illikainen	6 ft 9 in (2.06 m)	232 lb (105 kg)	So	Brewster Academy	Grand Rapids, Minnesota
F	30	Vitto Brown	6 ft 8 in (2.03 m)	235 lb (107 kg)	Sr	Bowling Green High School (OH)	Bowling Green, Ohio
G	31	Michael Ballard (W) (redshirt)	6 ft 4 in (1.93 m)	194 lb (88 kg)	Fr	Fenwick High School (IL)	Oak Park, Illinois
F	33	Andy Van Vliet	7 ft 0 in (2.13 m)	224 lb (102 kg)	So	Antwerp Giants	Antwerp, Belgium

Head coach

- Greg Gard (UW-Platteville)

Assistant coach(es)

- Lamont Paris (Wooster)
- Howard Moore (Wisconsin)
- Joe Krabbenhoft (Wisconsin)

Legend

- (C) Team captain
- (S) Suspended
- (I) Ineligible
- (W) Walk-on
- Injured
- Current redshirt

Roster

== Schedule and results ==
Date time, TV	Rank^{#}	Opponent^{#}	Result	Record	High points	High rebounds	High assists	Site (attendance) city, state
Exhibition
Oct 30, 2016*; 5:00 pm, BTN+		UW–Platteville	W 86–58	–	12 – Koenig	10 – Thomas	2 – 4 Tied	Kohl Center (17,287); Madison, WI
Non-conference regular season
Nov 11, 2016*; 7:00 pm, BTN+	No. 9	Central Arkansas	W 79–47	1–0	16 – Koenig	9 – Happ	5 – Hayes	Kohl Center (17,287); Madison, WI
Nov 15, 2016*; 7:30 pm, FS1	No. 9	at No. 22 Creighton; Gavitt Tipoff Games	L 67–79	1–1	21 – Koenig	10 – Happ	5 – Hayes	CenturyLink Center Omaha (17,879); Omaha, NE
Nov 17, 2016*; 7:00 pm, ESPN3	No. 9	Chicago State	W 69–51	2–1	12 – Brown	7 – Happ, Thomas	7 – Trice	Kohl Center (17,287); Madison, WI
Nov 21, 2016*; 1:30 pm, ESPN2	No. 16	vs. Tennessee; Maui Invitational quarterfinals	W 74–62	3–1	21 – Koenig	10 – Hayes	4 – Koenig	Lahaina Civic Center (2,400); Maui, HI
Nov 22, 2016*; 7:15 pm, ESPN2	No. 16	vs. Georgetown; Maui Invitational semifinals	W 73–57	4–1	20 – Koenig	15 – Happ	3 – Brown	Lahaina Civic Center (2,400); Maui, HI
Nov 23, 2016*; 8:30 pm, ESPN2	No. 16	vs. No. 4 North Carolina; Maui Invitational championship	L 56–71	4–2	15 – Brown	6 – Happ, Iverson	4 – Happ	Lahaina Civic Center (2,400); Maui, HI
Nov 27, 2016*; 1:00 pm, ESPN3	No. 16	Prairie View A&M; Maui Invitational On-Site Campus Game	W 95–50	5–2	17 – Hayes	13 – Happ	3 – Showalter	Kohl Center (17,287); Madison, WI
Nov 29, 2016*; 6:30 pm, ESPN	No. 17	No. 22 Syracuse; ACC–Big Ten Challenge	W 77–60	6–2	24 – Happ	13 – Happ	10 – Hayes	Kohl Center (17,287); Madison, WI
Dec 3, 2016*; 12:00 pm, BTN	No. 17	Oklahoma	W 90–70	7–2	28 – Hayes	9 – Happ	6 – Hayes	Kohl Center (17,287); Madison, WI
Dec 7, 2016*; 7:00 pm, ESPN3	No. 17	Idaho State	W 78–44	8–2	21 – Koenig	12 – Happ	3 – Happ, Showalter	Kohl Center (17,287); Madison, WI
Dec 10, 2016*; 1:00 pm, FS1	No. 17	at Marquette; Rivalry	W 93–84	9–2	18 – Koenig	9 – Hayes	6 – Koenig	BMO Harris Bradley Center (18,691); Milwaukee, WI
Dec 14, 2016*; 8:00 pm, BTN	No. 14	Green Bay	W 73–59	10–2	24 – Hayes	10 – Happ	6 – Happ	Kohl Center (17,287); Madison, WI
Dec 23, 2016*; 8:00 pm, BTN	No. 14	Florida A&M	W 90–37	11–2	14 – Trice	9 – Happ	4 – Hayes	Kohl Center (17,287); Madison, WI
Big Ten regular season
Dec 27, 2016; 6:00 pm, ESPN2	No. 14	Rutgers	W 72–52	12–2 (1–0)	20 – Hayes	11 – Happ	3 – Brown	Kohl Center (17,287); Madison, WI
Jan 3, 2017; 6:00 pm, ESPN	No. 13	at No. 25 Indiana	W 75–68	13–2 (2–0)	19 – Happ	6 – Brown, Happ	4 – Happ	Assembly Hall (14,679); Bloomington, IN
Jan 8, 2017; 3:30 pm, CBS	No. 13	at No. 20 Purdue	L 55–66	13–3 (2–1)	17 – Happ	5 – Happ, Hayes	4 – Happ	Mackey Arena (14,264); West Lafayette, IN
Jan 12, 2017; 6:00 pm, ESPN2	No. 18	Ohio State	W 89–66	14–3 (3–1)	21 – Koenig	11 – Happ	4 – Hayes, Showalter	Kohl Center (17,287); Madison, WI
Jan 17, 2017; 8:00 pm, ESPN	No. 17	Michigan	W 68–64	15–3 (4–1)	16 – Koenig	6 – Happ, Hayes	3 – Happ, Hayes, Showalter	Kohl Center (17,287); Madison, WI
Jan 21, 2017; 3:30 pm, BTN	No. 17	at Minnesota	W 78–76 ^{OT}	16–3 (5–1)	28 – Happ	12 – Happ	6 – Happ	Williams Arena (14,625); Minneapolis, MN
Jan 24, 2017; 8:00 pm, BTN	No. 15	Penn State	W 82–55	17–3 (6–1)	20 – Koenig	8 – Happ, Hayes	4 – Hayes, Trice	Kohl Center (17,287); Madison, WI
Jan 28, 2017; 11:00 am, BTN	No. 15	vs. Rutgers; B1G Super Saturday	W 61–54 ^{OT}	18–3 (7–1)	32 – Happ	11 – Hayes	4 – Hayes	Madison Square Garden (8,531); New York, NY
Jan 31, 2017; 8:00 pm, BTN	No. 10	at Illinois	W 57–43	19–3 (8–1)	14 – Happ	13 – Happ	3 – Koenig	State Farm Center (12,334); Champaign, IL
Feb 5, 2017; 12:00 pm, CBS	No. 10	Indiana	W 65–60	20–3 (9–1)	20 – Happ	10 – Hayes	3 – Koenig	Kohl Center (17,287); Madison, WI
Feb 9, 2017; 8:00 pm, BTN	No. 7	at Nebraska	W 70–69 ^{OT}	21–3 (10–1)	20 – Hayes	14 – Happ	3 – Brown	Pinnacle Bank Arena (15,772); Lincoln, NE
Feb 12, 2017; 5:30 pm, BTN	No. 7	Northwestern	L 59–66	21–4 (10–2)	13 – Hayes	7 – Happ, Hayes	5 – Happ	Kohl Center (17,287); Madison, WI
Feb 16, 2017; 6:00 pm, ESPN	No. 11	at Michigan	L 58–64	21–5 (10–3)	22 – Happ	8 – Showalter	6 – Happ	Crisler Center (12,128); Ann Arbor, MI
Feb 19, 2017; 12:00 pm, CBS	No. 11	No. 23 Maryland	W 71–60	22–5 (11–3)	21 – Hayes	10 – Hayes	3 – Happ	Kohl Center (17,287); Madison, WI
Feb 23, 2017; 8:00 pm, ESPN	No. 16	at Ohio State	L 73–83	22–6 (11–4)	27 – Koenig	6 – Happ	4 – Hayes	Value City Arena (11,505); Columbus, OH
Feb 26, 2017; 3:00 pm, CBS	No. 16	at Michigan State	L 74–84	22–7 (11–5)	22 – Hayes	11 – Happ, Hayes	4 – Hayes	Breslin Center (14,797); East Lansing, MI
Mar 2, 2017; 8:00 pm, ESPN	No. 22	Iowa	L 57–59	22–8 (11–6)	19 – Koenig	7 – Hayes	2 – Happ, Hayes, Showalter, Trice	Kohl Center (17,287); Madison, WI
Mar 5, 2017; 5:00 pm, BTN	No. 22	Minnesota	W 66–49	23–8 (12–6)	17 – Koenig	13 – Happ	5 – Happ	Kohl Center (17,287); Madison, WI
Big Ten tournament
Mar 10, 2017; 5:30 pm, BTN	(2) No. 24	vs. (10) Indiana; Quarterfinals	W 70–60	24–8	16 – Koenig	12 – Happ	5 – Koenig	Verizon Center (15,624); Washington, D.C.
Mar 11, 2017; 2:30 pm, CBS	(2) No. 24	vs. (6) Northwestern; Semifinals	W 76–48	25–8	18 – Hayes	10 – Hayes	3 – Trice	Verizon Center (13,984); Washington, D.C.
Mar 12, 2017; 2:00 pm, CBS	(2) No. 24	vs. (8) Michigan; Championship	L 56–71	25–9	15 – Koenig	11 – Happ, Hayes	3 – Happ, Trice	Verizon Center; Washington, D.C.
NCAA Tournament
Mar 16, 2017; 8:40 pm, CBS	(8 E) No. 25	vs. (9 E) Virginia Tech; First Round	W 84–74	26–9	28 – Koenig	10 – Hayes	4 – Showalter	KeyBank Center (17,619); Buffalo, NY
Mar 18, 2017; 1:40 pm, CBS	(8 E) No. 25	vs. (1 E) No. 1 Villanova; Second Round	W 65–62	27–9	19 – Hayes	8 – Happ, Hayes	3 – Happ	KeyBank Center (19,261); Buffalo, NY
Mar 24, 2017; 9:13 pm, TBS	(8 E) No. 25	vs. (4 E) No. 20 Florida; Sweet Sixteen	L 83–84 ^{OT}	27–10	22 – Hayes	8 – Iverson	4 – Happ	Madison Square Garden (20,047); New York, NY
*Non-conference game. ^{#}Rankings from AP Poll. (#) Tournament seedings in parentheses. All times are in Central TimeSource.

== Rankings ==
Ranking movements Legend: ██ Increase in ranking ██ Decrease in ranking
	Week																			
Poll	Pre	1	2	3	4	5	6	7	8	9	10	11	12	13	14	15	16	17	18	Final
AP	9	9	16	17	17	14	14	14	13	18	17	15	10	7	11	16	22	24	25	Not released
Coaches	10	11	14	17	17	14	14	14	11	17	17	15	9	5	10	15	21	23	22	16

*AP does not release post-NCAA tournament rankings

== Player statistics ==
Individual player statistics
			Minutes		Scoring		Total FGs			3-point FGs			Free-Throws			Rebounds							
Player	GP	GS	Tot	Avg	Pts	Avg	FG	FGA	Pct	3FG	3FA	Pct	FT	FTA	Pct	Off	Def	Tot	Avg	A	TO	Blk	Stl
Brown, Vitto	37	37	777	21.0	253	6.8	92	231	.398	44	138	.319	25	33	.758	47	96	143	3.9	37	52	17	18
Ferris, Matt	11	0	11	1.0	0	0.0	0	5	.000	0	2	.000	0	0	.000	3	2	5	0.5	2	0	0	1
Happ, Ethan	37	37	1027	27.8	517	14.0	218	372	.586	0	0	.000	81	162	.500	117	215	332	9.0	104	81	43	67
Hayes, Nigel	37	37	1198	32.4	517	14.0	180	394	.457	22	70	.314	135	230	.587	82	163	245	6.6	100	63	14	28
Hill, Jordan	35	0	348	9.9	53	1.5	19	54	.352	9	35	.257	6	9	.667	7	31	38	1.1	16	9	1	6
Illikainen, Alex	27	0	224	8.3	34	1.3	12	37	.324	4	16	.250	6	12	.500	16	24	40	1.5	9	5	3	3
Iverson, Khalil	35	0	536	15.3	136	3.9	50	94	.532	4	13	.308	32	57	.561	45	71	116	3.3	22	34	20	18
Koenig, Bronson	36	35	1129	31.4	522	14.5	181	432	.419	103	262	.393	57	63	.905	6	71	77	2.1	73	51	12	23
Moesch, Aaron	18	0	40	2.2	3	0.2	1	4	.250	0	0	.000	1	2	.500	5	2	7	0.4	2	0	0	2
Pritzl, Brevin	24	0	195	8.1	45	1.9	13	38	.342	5	21	.238	14	19	.737	14	12	26	1.1	2	5	0	7
Schlundt, T.J.	13	0	21	1.6	3	0.2	1	6	.167	0	4	.000	1	1	1.000	1	1	2	0.2	0	0	1	0
Showalter, Zak	37	37	1092	29.5	307	8.3	107	214	.500	49	123	.398	44	53	.830	29	78	107	2.9	65	41	11	57
Thomas IV, Charlie	28	0	177	6.3	62	2.2	21	54	.389	2	6	.333	18	20	.900	14	22	36	1.3	6	17	4	0
Trice, D'Mitrik	37	2	677	18.3	208	5.6	70	184	.380	38	91	.418	30	38	.789	7	62	69	1.9	63	37	3	20
Van Vliet, Andy	14	0	48	3.4	18	1.3	6	17	.353	3	8	.375	3	4	.750	5	15	20	1.4	2	2	2	0
Team																							
Total	37		7500		2678	72.4	971	2136	.455	283	789	.359	453	703	.644	460	916	1376	37.2	503	411	131	250
Opponents	37		7500		2308	62.4	822	1993	.412	251	667	.376	413	559	.739	319	825	1144	30.9	376	472	115	197

Legend
GP	Games played	GS	Games started	Avg	Average per game
FG	Field-goals made	FGA	Field-goal attempts	Off	Offensive rebounds
Def	Defensive rebounds	A	Assists	TO	Turnovers
Blk	Blocks	Stl	Steals	High	Team high

== See also ==
- 2016–17 Wisconsin Badgers women's basketball team
