= D. J. Wilson =

American basketball player (born 1996)

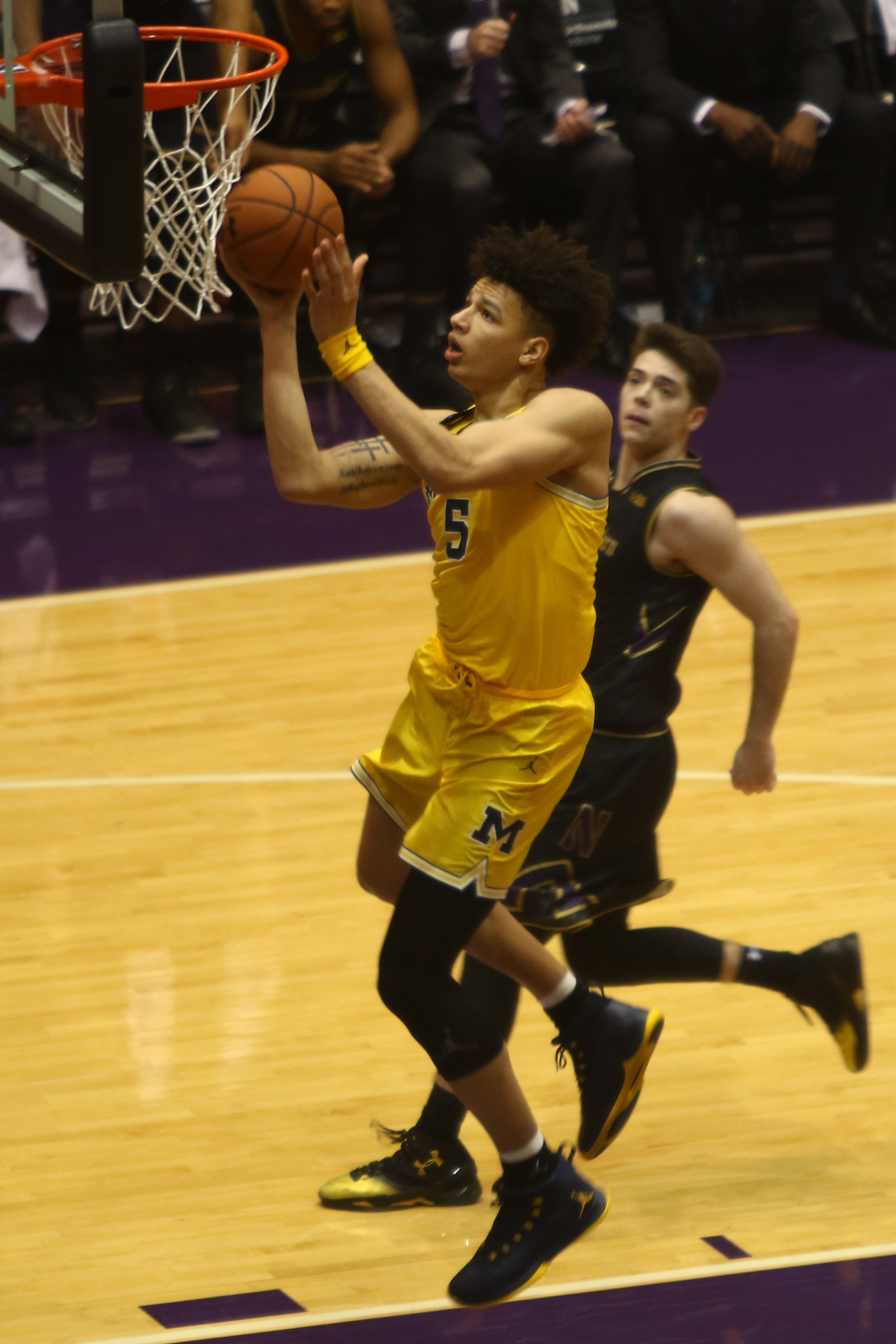
- Wilson with Michigan in 2017

No. 1 – Jilin Northeast Tigers
- Position: Power forward
- League: CBA

Personal information
- Born: February 19, 1996 (age 30) Mount Shasta, California, U.S.
- Listed height: 6 ft 10 in (2.08 m)
- Listed weight: 230 lb (104 kg)

Career information
- High school: Capital Christian (Sacramento, California)
- College: Michigan (2014–2017)
- NBA draft: 2017: 1st round, 17th overall pick
- Drafted by: Milwaukee Bucks
- Playing career: 2017–present

Career history
- 2017–2021: Milwaukee Bucks
- 2017–2020: →Wisconsin Herd
- 2021: Houston Rockets
- 2021–2023: Oklahoma City Blue
- 2021–2022: Toronto Raptors
- 2023–2024: Osceola Magic
- 2024: Philadelphia 76ers
- 2024–2025: Shanghai Sharks
- 2025–present: Jilin Northeast Tigers
- 2026: Cangrejeros de Santurce

Career highlights
- CBA Club Cup champion (2025)
- Stats at NBA.com
- Stats at Basketball Reference

DeVante Jaylen Wilson (born February 19, 1996) is an American professional basketball player for the Jilin Northeast Tigers of the Chinese Basketball Association (CBA). He played college basketball for the Michigan Wolverines and completed his junior season for the 2016–17 season. He was drafted 17th overall in the 2017 NBA draft by the Milwaukee Bucks, where he spent four seasons before he was traded to the Houston Rockets in March 2021.

== Early life and education ==
At Capital Christian School in Sacramento, Wilson endured a fifth lumbar vertebra stress fracture, which sidelined him during the summer of 2012 and part of his junior season, which caused him to lose the attention of some recruiters. He spent three months in a back brace from his hips to his chest. By the middle of his junior season, he completed a 1-year 5-inch growth spurt that took him to a height of 6 feet 8 inches (2.03 m). By June 2013, he had recovered enough to tally 22 points and 8 rebounds against Ivan Rabb at a California Golden Bears camp event at Haas Pavilion. Soon thereafter, Michigan and other schools began recruiting him. The defending 2013 national runner-up Wolverines hosted him (and Devin Booker) during the first weekend of October 2013 and he accepted Michigan over offers from USC, Gonzaga, Northwestern, and Harvard.

Wilson signed his National Letter of Intent with Michigan on November 13, 2013, with the expectation that Jordan Morgan would graduate from the 2013–14 Wolverines team and both Glenn Robinson III and Mitch McGary would enter the 2014 NBA draft. At the time of his signing, he was believed to be the first Sacramento area player to ever sign with a Big Ten Conference school. Wilson posted 29 points for Capital Christian School against Rabb and Bishop O'Dowd High School in the Northern California Open Division championship loss on March 22, 2014. After having committed to Michigan as the 135th ranked prospect of the national class of 2014 in October 2013, Wilson's ranking rose to 86th by April 2014 according to Rivals.

College recruiting
Name	Hometown	School	Height	Weight	Commit date
D. J. Wilson; PF	Sacramento, CA	Capital Christian (CA)	6 ft 10 in (2.08 m)	230 lb (100 kg)	Oct 6, 2013
D. J. Wilson; PF	Recruit ratings: Scout: Rivals: 247Sports: ESPN:				
Overall recruit ranking: Scout: 68, 14 (PF) Rivals: 86 ESPN: 41 (PF), 14 (CA)
Note: In many cases, Scout, Rivals, 247Sports, On3, and ESPN may conflict in their listings of height and weight.; In these cases, the average was taken. ESPN grades are on a 100-point scale.; Sources: "Michigan 2014 Basketball Commitments". Rivals.; "2014 Michigan Basketball Commits". Scout.; "ESPN". ESPN.; "Scout.com Team Recruiting Rankings". Scout.; "2014 Team Ranking". Rivals.

== College career ==
=== Freshman season (2014–2015) ===
Prior to the 2014–15 season, Wilson had surgery on his little finger, and he was sidelined during some of the offseason and the August 15 — 24 four-game exhibition tour of Italy. Upon his arrival, he was diagnosed with valgus deformity ("knock-kneed"), and his neuromuscular therapy would eventually increase his vertical jump by 8 inches (20 cm) during his college career. During the fifth game of the season for the 2014–15 team against Villanova in the 2014 Legends Classic, Wilson was injured when he was blocked and knocked down on a slam dunk attempt against Dylan Ennis. He was sidelined due to a sprained knee and eventually missed the remainder of the season. Ennis later transferred to play at Oregon.

=== Sophomore season (2015–2016) ===
On December 19, 2015, Michigan defeated Youngstown State 105–46 with Wilson contributing 12 points on 5–6 shooting. The 59-point win was the second largest in school history. Although Wilson appeared in 26 games for the 2015–16 Wolverines, he only played as many as 10 minutes 5 times. Nevertheless, he finished second on the team in blocked shots with 10, including two in a January 12, 2016 upset of (#3/#3) Maryland. It was Michigan's first win over a top-three nationally ranked opponent at Crisler Center since the 1997–98 team defeated No. 3 Duke, 81–73, on December 13, 1997.

=== Junior season (2016–2017) ===
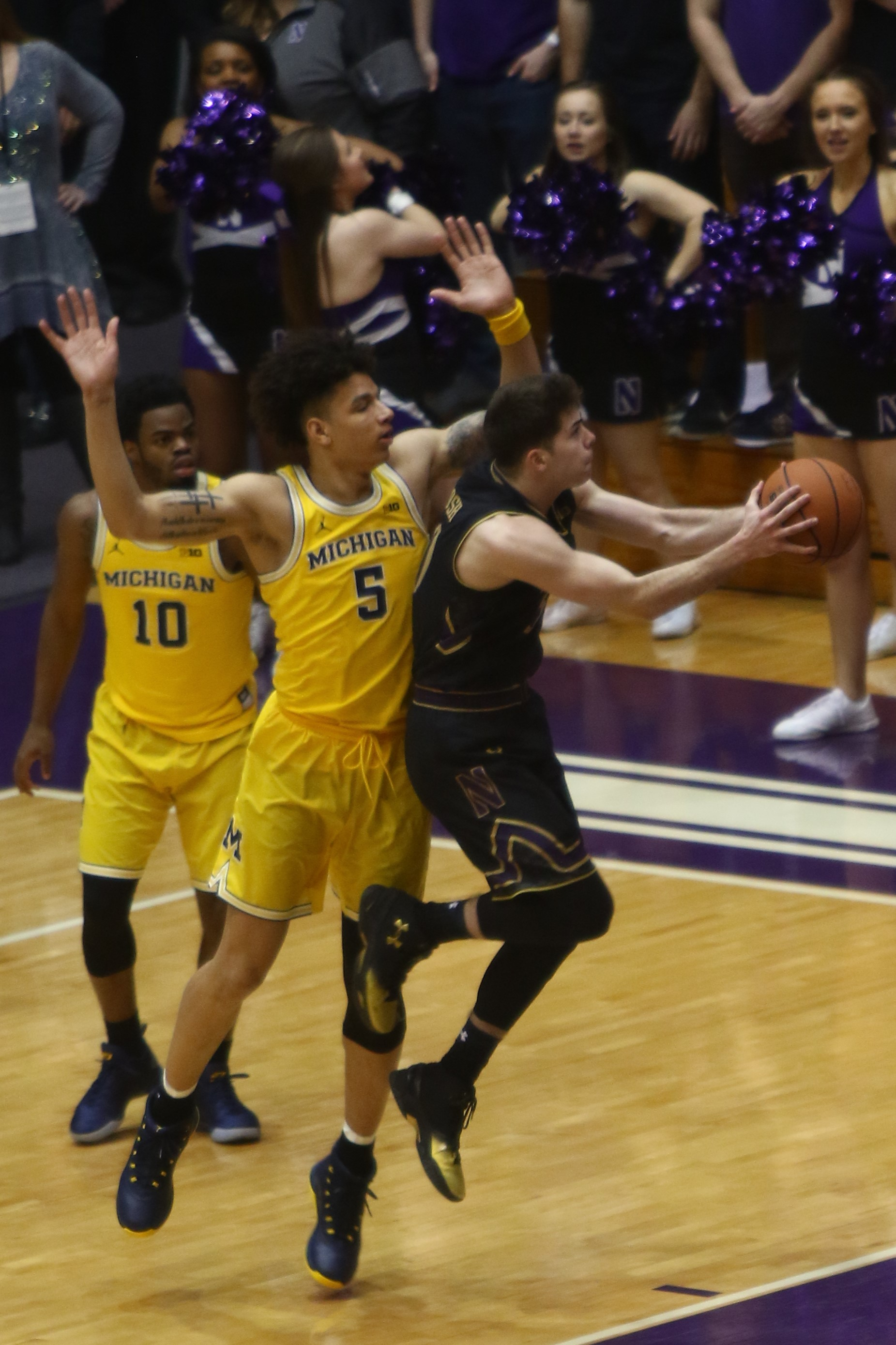
Wilson defends Bryant McIntosh of the Northwestern Wildcats during a 2017 game

In the January 1 Big Ten conference opener against Iowa, Wilson posted a career-high 28 points and 14 rebounds in an 83–86 overtime loss. On February 19, Wilson posted a team-high 16 points, including a game-tying three point field goal, in an overtime 78–83 loss to Minnesota. On March 10, Michigan defeated (#12/#13) Purdue 74–70 in overtime during the quarterfinals of the 2017 Big Ten Conference men's basketball tournament. Michigan was led by Wilson with 8 rebounds, 3 blocked shots and a game-high 26 points, which was the second highest single-game scoring performance of the tournament (trailing teammate Derrick Walton's 29-point performance the following day). Wilson averaged 15.3 points per game for Michigan's four games during the Big Ten tournament, helping the 2016–17 Wolverines emerge as the champion. Wilson averaged 16 points, 3 blocks and 4.3 rebounds in three 2017 NCAA Division I men's basketball tournament games, helping Michigan reach the round of sixteen, where the team was eliminated by Ennis' 2016–17 Oregon Ducks. In the NCAA tournament wins against Oklahoma State and Louisville, Wilson went a combined 6–6 from the free throw line in the final 30 seconds of play. His overall averages for 7 postseason games was 15.6 points on 53.8% field goal shooting with 5.0 rebounds and 2.0 blocks. He finished the season as the team's leading rebounder and shot blocker with overall averages of 5.3 rebounds and 1.5 blocks. His 203 rebounds were the most by a Wolverine since Mitch McGary 4 years earlier and his 57 blocks were the most in nine seasons (Ekpe Udoh).

Following the 2017 NCAA Tournament, he began to appear in various mock draft projections for the 2017 NBA draft. On April 10, both Wilson and teammate Moritz Wagner declared for the draft, but did not hire agents, which gave them until May 24 to withdraw their names and retain their athletic eligibility to return to Michigan. During the week prior to the NBA Combine, he injured his quadriceps during a workout with the San Antonio Spurs, relegating him to taking part in physical measurements and interviews. Wilson stated during combine interviews that he would not remain in the draft unless he was assured of being a first-rounder. On May 24, Wilson announced he would remain in the draft, forgoing his final two years of eligibility.

== Professional career ==
=== Milwaukee Bucks (2017–2021) ===
On June 22, 2017, Wilson was drafted 17th overall by the Milwaukee Bucks in the 2017 NBA draft. He was the first of four 2016–17 Big Ten Conference players selected in the draft. Wilson signed a $12.1 million rookie scale contract with the Bucks on July 6. He debuted on October 20, 2017, against the Cleveland Cavaliers, but did not score or post any other stats. Wilson posted his first four points against the Oklahoma City Thunder on October 31. During the season, the Bucks assigned Wilson to their NBA G League affiliate Wisconsin Herd multiple times.

Wilson missed the first 22 games of the season with a hamstring injury for the 2018–19 Milwaukee Bucks. Despite being injured and having only 71 minutes of NBA experience, he was still signed for a $3 million third-year option by the Bucks at the October 31 rookie-scale player options deadline. On December 19 against the New Orleans Pelicans, Wilson posted a career-high 10 rebounds along with 9 points. On December 27 against the New York Knicks, he posted his first NBA double-double with 14 rebounds and 10 points in 21 minutes. On January 16, he established a new career-high with 13 points against the Memphis Grizzlies. He improved his scoring best on January 31 against the Toronto Raptors by posting 16 points. On March 31, 2019, Wilson made his first career start against the Atlanta Hawks. On April 10, the final night of the season, Wilson posted a career-high 18 points, 17 rebounds and 4 assists against the Oklahoma City Thunder.

On October 24, 2019, the Bucks exercised the fourth-year option of Wilson's rookie contract for $4.5 million, extending the contract through the 2020–21 season. Wilson posted a career-high 19 points on December 2 against the New York Knicks.

=== Houston Rockets (2021) ===
On March 19, 2021, Wilson was traded to the Houston Rockets along with D. J. Augustin and picks for P. J. Tucker and Rodions Kurucs. On August 1, the Rockets declined to extend a $6.9 million qualifying offer to Wilson, making him an unrestricted free agent.

=== Toronto Raptors / Oklahoma City Blue (2021–2023) ===
On September 27, 2021, Wilson signed with the Oklahoma City Thunder. Wilson was waived from Oklahoma City on October 15, and he subsequently joined the Oklahoma City Blue. In 13 games, he averaged 13.9 points and 9.6 rebounds.

On December 22, 2021, Wilson signed a 10-day contract with the Toronto Raptors after the team was granted a hardship exception. On January 7, 2022, he signed a second 10-day hardship exception contract. On January 17, Wilson was reacquired by the Blue.

On February 28, 2022, Wilson signed a 10-day contract with the Raptors. He was waived on March 6. On March 7, Wilson was reacquired by the Blue. However, he was waived the next day after suffering a season-ending injury.

On July 8, 2022, the Toronto Raptors announced that they had signed Wilson. He was waived on October 15. On November 3, 2022, Wilson was named to the opening night roster for the Blue.

=== Osceola Magic / Philadelphia 76ers (2023–2024) ===
On February 12, 2023, Wilson was traded to the Lakeland Magic in exchange for a 2023 first-round pick. However, he didn't play for them. On September 29, he signed with the Orlando Magic, but was waived on October 13. On November 2, he joined the Osceola Magic.

On March 24, 2024, Wilson signed a 10-day contract with the Philadelphia 76ers. On April 4, he returned to Osceola.

=== Shanghai Sharks (2024–2025) ===
On September 6, 2024, Wilson signed with the Shanghai Sharks of the Chinese Basketball Association.

=== Cangrejeros de Santurce (2026) ===
On May 17, 2026, Wilson signed a deal to play for Bad Bunny’s Cangrejeros de Santurce of the Baloncesto Superior Nacional. On May 25, 2026, Wilson had his first double-double of the season, scoring 16 points and grabbing 10 rebounds in a competitive win against the Osos de Manatí, 92-87.

== Career statistics ==
Legend
GP	Games played	GS	Games started	MPG	Minutes per game
FG%	Field goal percentage	3P%	3-point field goal percentage	FT%	Free throw percentage
RPG	Rebounds per game	APG	Assists per game	SPG	Steals per game
BPG	Blocks per game	PPG	Points per game	**Bold**	Career high

=== NBA ===
==== Regular season ====
Year	Team	GP	GS	MPG	FG%	3P%	FT%	RPG	APG	SPG	BPG	PPG
2017–18	Milwaukee	22	0	3.2	.563	**.400**	.500	.5	.1	.1	.0	1.0
2018–19	Milwaukee	**48**	**3**	**18.4**	.414	.362	.553	4.6	1.1	.4	.4	5.8
2019–20	Milwaukee	37	1	9.8	.394	.247	.611	2.5	.7	.1	.1	3.6
2020–21	Milwaukee	12	0	8.8	.372	.357	.500	2.1	.3	.1	.3	3.6
2020–21	Houston	23	1	14.3	.416	.339	.696	3.8	.9	.4	.5	6.1
2021–22	Toronto	4	1	13.5	**.733**	.000	**.800**	**4.0**	**1.3**	**1.3**	.3	**7.5**
2023–24	Philadelphia	2	0	7.7	.667	**1.000**	—	1.0	1.0	.0	**1.0**	5.0
Career		148	6	12.3	.422	.331	.618	3.1	.7	.3	.3	4.4

==== Playoffs ====
Year	Team	GP	GS	MPG	FG%	3P%	FT%	RPG	APG	SPG	BPG	PPG
2019	Milwaukee	8	0	5.4	.500	.200	1.000	1.3	.5	.0	.1	2.4
Career		8	0	5.4	.500	.200	1.000	1.3	.5	.0	.1	2.4

=== College ===
Year	Team	GP	GS	MPG	FG%	3P%	FT%	RPG	APG	SPG	BPG	PPG
2014–15	Michigan	5	0	4.8	.250	.000	–	1.2	.0	.0	.6	.4
2015–16	Michigan	26	0	6.1	.474	.333	.727	.7	.3	.2	.4	2.7
2016–17	Michigan	**38**	**36**	**30.4**	**.538**	**.373**	**.833**	**5.3**	**1.3**	**.5**	**1.5**	**11.0**
Career		69	36	19.4	.525	.363	.817	3.3	.8	.4	1.0	7.1
