= 2015–16 Michigan Wolverines men's basketball team =

American college basketball season

2015–16 Michigan Wolverines men's basketball

NCAA tournament, First Round
- Conference: Big Ten Conference
- Record: 23–13 (10–8 Big Ten)
- Head coach: John Beilein (9th season)
- Assistant coaches: Jeff Meyer; LaVall Jordan; Bacari Alexander
- MVP: Zak Irvin
- Captains: Caris LeVert; Spike Albrecht
- Home arena: Crisler Center

2015–16 Big Ten Conference men's basketball standings
	Conf.				Overall
Team	W		L	PCT	W		L	PCT
No. 14 Indiana	15	–	3	.833	27	–	8	.771
No. 2 Michigan State †	13	–	5	.722	29	–	6	.829
No. 18 Maryland	12	–	6	.667	27	–	9	.750
No. 12 Purdue	12	–	6	.667	26	–	9	.743
No. 25 Iowa	12	–	6	.667	22	–	11	.667
Wisconsin	12	–	6	.667	22	–	13	.629
Ohio State	11	–	7	.611	21	–	14	.600
Michigan	10	–	8	.556	23	–	13	.639
Northwestern	8	–	10	.444	20	–	12	.625
Penn State	7	–	11	.389	16	–	16	.500
Nebraska	6	–	12	.333	16	–	18	.471
Illinois	5	–	13	.278	15	–	19	.441
Minnesota	2	–	16	.111	11	–	20	.355
Rutgers	1	–	17	.056	7	–	25	.219
† 2016 Big Ten tournament winner Rankings from AP poll

The 2015–16 Michigan Wolverines men's basketball team represented the University of Michigan during the 2015–16 NCAA Division I men's basketball season. The team played its home games in Ann Arbor, Michigan for the 49th consecutive year at the Crisler Center, which has a capacity of 12,707. The Wolverines were led by ninth-year head coach John Beilein. The team was known as Squad 100 or Team 100, because it was Michigan's 100th season as a basketball program, and 99th consecutive year as a member of the Big Ten Conference.

The 2014–15 Wolverines had entered the season coming off the school's winningest two-year stretch in history, but did not reach the NCAA Division I men's basketball tournament after losing starters Caris LeVert and Derrick Walton to season-ending injuries in January. The 2015–16 team followed the first season in five years in which the school did not make the NCAA Tournament. In addition to the season-ending injuries for LeVert and Walton in the prior season, the team was coming off an offseason which saw Spike Albrecht and Zak Irvin have surgeries. Albrecht retired from the sport in December, although he later changed his mind. Later that month, Levert had an injury that ended his season. He only played in one conference game. He led the team in many statistical categories at the time of his injury and made midseason watchlists for various major national awards.

The team won two games in the 2016 Big Ten Conference men's basketball tournament and one in the play-in game versus Tulsa, also known as the First Four. The Wolverines finished the season 23–13. Following the season, Walton and Irvin were among the All-Big Ten conference honorees. Walton was a third team selection by the coaches and honorable mention selection by the media. Irvin was an honorable mention selection by both.

== 2015–16 recruits ==
On March 11, 2015, Michigan offered a scholarship to German Euroleague player Moritz "Moe" Wagner, and he committed to Michigan on April 5. Brent Hibbitts accepted a preferred walk-on role with the class of 2015 over scholarships from Central Michigan, Western Michigan, Vermont, Appalachian State and American University.

College recruiting
Name	Hometown	School	Height	Weight	Commit date
Moritz Wagner; PF	Berlin, Germany	Alba Berlin	6 ft 9 in (2.06 m)	N/A	May 4, 2015
Moritz Wagner; PF	Recruit ratings: Rivals: 247Sports:				
Brent Hibbitts; F		Hudsonville	6 ft 8 in (2.03 m)	N/A	Nov 5, 2015
Brent Hibbitts; F	Recruit ratings: No ratings found				
Overall recruit ranking:
Note: In many cases, Scout, Rivals, 247Sports, On3, and ESPN may conflict in their listings of height and weight.; In these cases, the average was taken. ESPN grades are on a 100-point scale.; Sources: "Michigan 2015 Basketball Commitments". Rivals.; "2015 Michigan Basketball Commits". Scout.; "ESPN Recruiting Nation Basketball". ESPN.; "Scout.com Team Recruiting Rankings". Scout.; "2015 Team Ranking". Rivals.

== Future recruits ==
=== 2016–17 ===
On August 7, 2014, Jon Teske, who lived in the Grand Rapids, Michigan suburb Grandville until he was 10 and his family moved to Medina, Ohio, committed to Michigan via Twitter. On April 16, 2015, Austin Davis of Onsted, Michigan committed to Michigan. On May 11, Tyus Battle committed to Michigan. At the time of Battle's signing, the entire set of scholarships for the class of 2016 seemed to be allocated. On June 19, Battle decommitted from Michigan. On July 28, Ibi Watson committed to Michigan from Caris LeVert's alma mater Pickerington High School Central. On September 9, Zavier Simpson committed to the team. He was ranked as the number 66 player and number 12 point guard by ESPN, number 55 and number 12 by Scout.com and number 87 player and number 44 guard by Rivals.com, making him the number 69 player and 13 point guard by 247Sports.com. Davis, Teske, Watson and Simpson all signed their National Letters of Intent on November 11, 2015.

Among the accomplishments of the recruits are Simpson earning the 2015 Ohio Associated Press Division I Player of the Year and Davis earning the 2015 Michigan Associated Press Class B Player of the Year awards as juniors, as well as Simpson's 2014 Ohio Division III state championship.

College recruiting
Name	Hometown	School	Height	Weight	Commit date
Austin Davis; C	Onsted, MI	Onsted High School (MI)	6 ft 10 in (2.08 m)	241.3 lb (109.5 kg)	Apr 16, 2015
Austin Davis; C	Recruit ratings: Scout: Rivals: 247Sports: ESPN:				
Jon Teske; C	Medina, OH	Medina Senior High School (OH)	6 ft 10 in (2.08 m)	220 lb (100 kg)	Jul 8, 2014
Jon Teske; C	Recruit ratings: Scout: Rivals: 247Sports: ESPN:				
Ibi Watson; SG	Pickerington, OH	Pickerington High School Central (OH)	6 ft 4.5 in (1.94 m)	175 lb (79 kg)	Jul 28, 2015
Ibi Watson; SG	Recruit ratings: Scout: Rivals: 247Sports: ESPN:				
Zavier Simpson; PG	Lima, OH	Lima Senior High School (OH)	5 ft 10.5 in (1.79 m)	160 lb (73 kg)	Sep 9, 2015
Zavier Simpson; PG	Recruit ratings: Scout: Rivals: 247Sports: ESPN:				
Overall recruit ranking:
Note: In many cases, Scout, Rivals, 247Sports, On3, and ESPN may conflict in their listings of height and weight.; In these cases, the average was taken. ESPN grades are on a 100-point scale.; Sources: "Michigan 2016 Basketball Commitments". Rivals.; "2016 Michigan Basketball Commits". Scout.; "ESPN Recruiting Nation Basketball". ESPN.; "Scout.com Team Recruiting Rankings". Scout.; "2016 Team Ranking". Rivals.

=== 2017–18 ===
On October 23, 2015, four-star recruit Jordan Poole became the first commitment for the Class of 2017 after a home gym visit from Beilein and assistant coach Jordan, and multiple Michigan campus visits. Poole had several competing offers, including Illinois, Indiana, Nebraska, Memphis, Marquette, and Auburn.

College recruiting
Name	Hometown	School	Height	Weight	Commit date
Jordan Poole; SG	Milwaukee, WI	Rufus King High School (WI)	6 ft 3.5 in (1.92 m)	180 lb (82 kg)	Oct 23, 2015
Jordan Poole; SG	Recruit ratings: Scout: Rivals: 247Sports: ESPN:				
Overall recruit ranking:
Note: In many cases, Scout, Rivals, 247Sports, On3, and ESPN may conflict in their listings of height and weight.; In these cases, the average was taken. ESPN grades are on a 100-point scale.; Sources: "Michigan 2017 Basketball Commitments". Rivals.; "2017 Michigan Basketball Commits". Scout.; "ESPN Recruiting Nation Basketball". ESPN.; "Scout.com Team Recruiting Rankings". Scout.; "2017 Team Ranking". Rivals.

== Departures ==
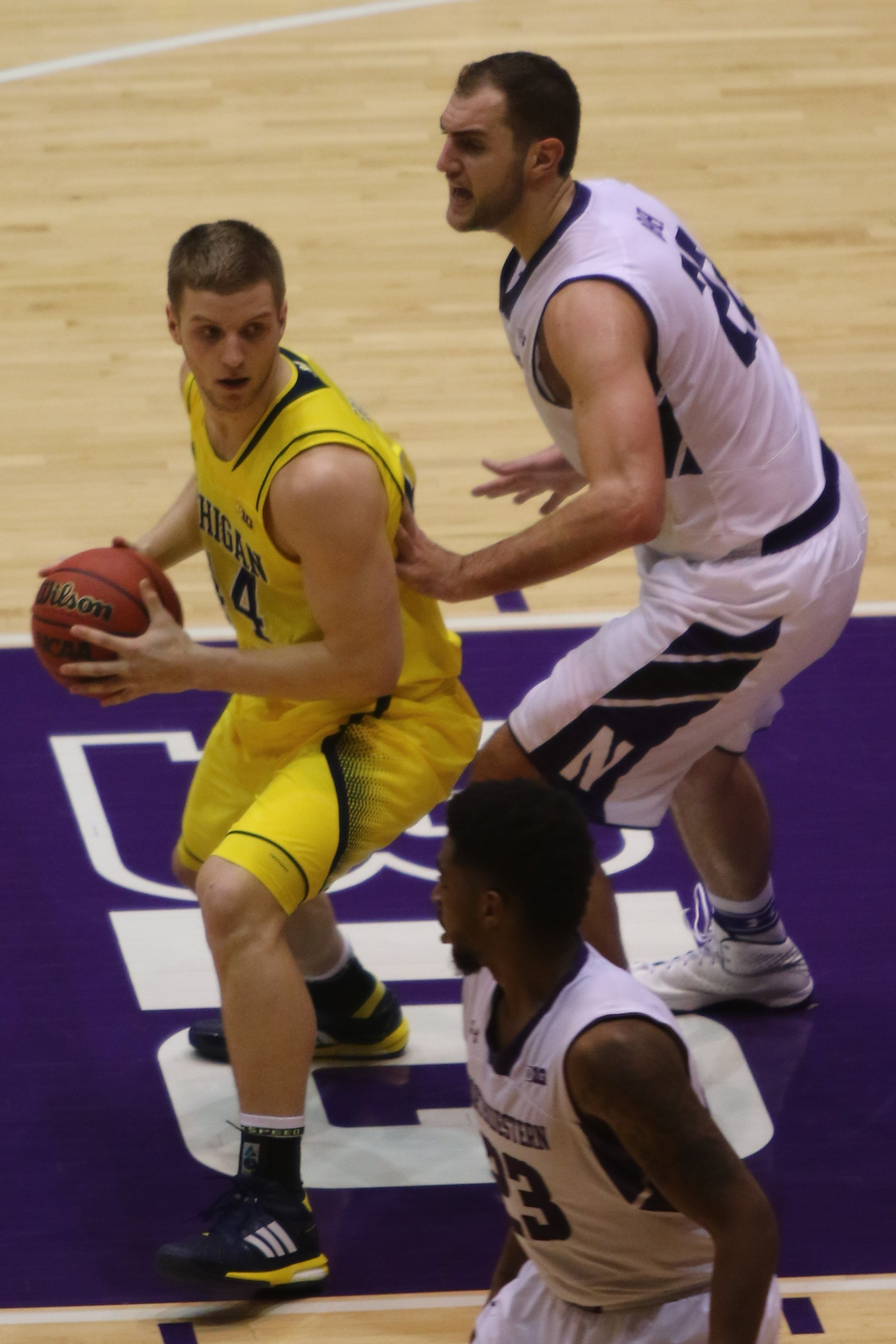
Max Bielfeldt transferred to Indiana.

Name	Number	Pos.	Height	Weight	Year	Hometown	Notes
Max Bielfeldt	44	F	6'7"	245	Senior	Peoria, Illinois	Graduated with eligibility remaining; transferred to Indiana
Austin Hatch	30	G	6'6"	215	Freshman	Fort Wayne, Indiana	Ended playing career on medical advice

In June 2015, Max Bielfeldt announced that he had decided to use his redshirt year to play for the 2015–16 Indiana Hoosiers after the Hoosiers dismissed two forwards from the team the month before. Bielfeldt had considered several midwest schools; DePaul, Nebraska and Iowa State were his other finalists.

== Preseason ==
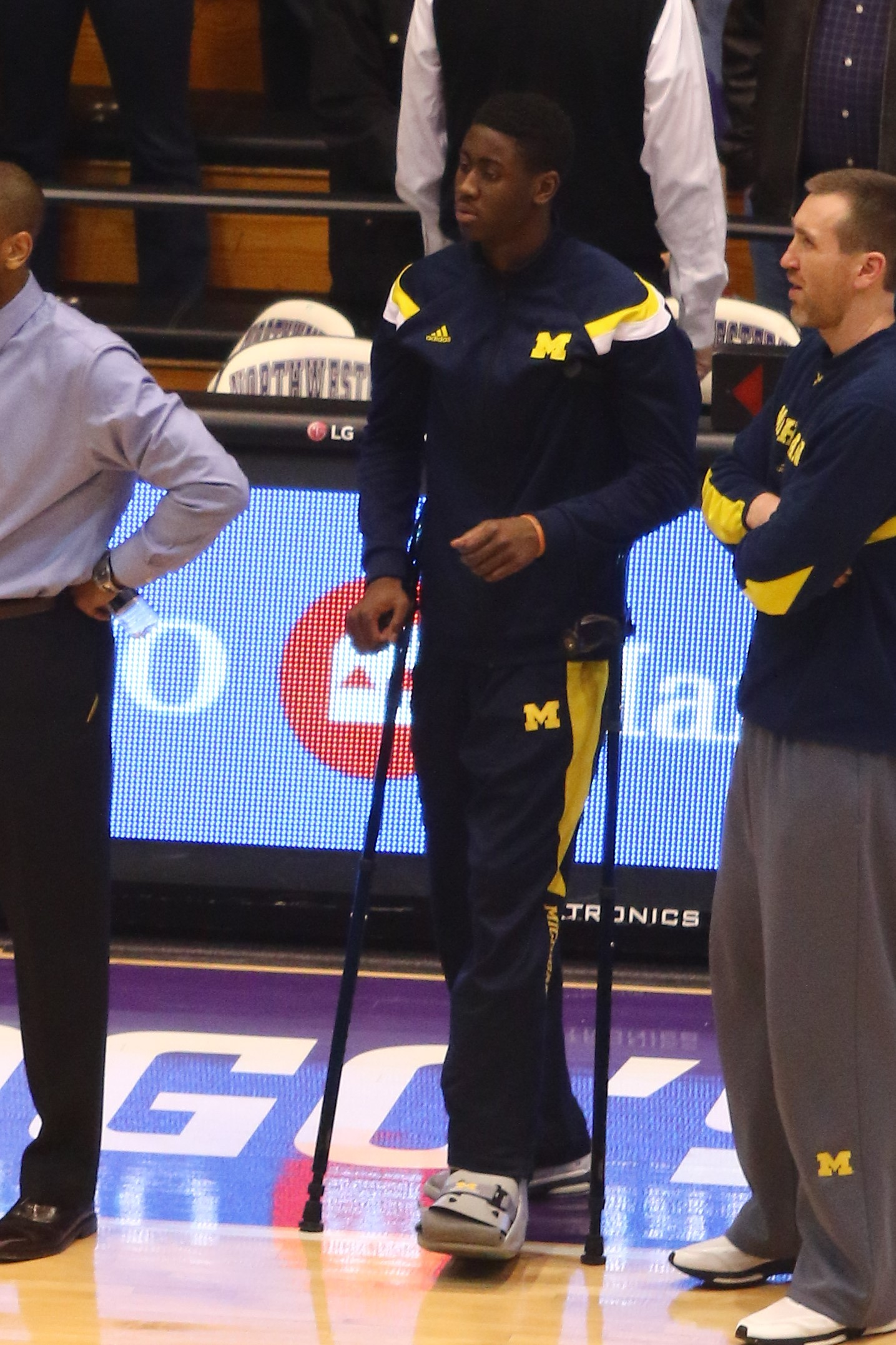
A midseason injury during the 2014–15 Michigan Wolverines' season impacted Caris LeVert's decision to return as a senior.

In April 2015, Spike Albrecht had offseason surgery on his right hip to correct for a genetic condition that may also necessitate left hip surgery. Following the 2015 NCAA Division I men's basketball tournament, several pollsters (including ESPN, USA Today, and NBC Sports) omitted Michigan from the expected preseason top 25. However, some who immediately projected Caris LeVert to return to Michigan included Michigan in the rankings: CBS Sports (#18) and Sports Illustrated (#16). Bleacher Report ranked Michigan at 25, noting lower expectations if LeVert declared himself eligible for the 2015 NBA draft. On April 21, LeVert announced that he would return for his senior season. That same day, Max Bielfeldt was released from his athletic scholarship with one year of eligibility remaining. Despite all 13 of its scholarships being committed at the time, Michigan continued to recruit five-star 2015 McDonald's All-American Jaylen Brown and four-star Kenny Williams for the class of 2015.

A scholarship for one of the potential recruits became available on April 27, when Beilein and rising sophomore Austin Hatch announced that Hatch, who had survived two plane crashes that killed his parents, siblings, and stepmother, would no longer play for the team due to medical issues stemming from injuries he suffered in the second crash. Michigan applied for and received a "medical exemption waiver" from the NCAA for Hatch; the waiver allows a school to keep a student-athlete who has career-ending medical issues on scholarship. Hatch transitioned to being a student assistant coach; as such, he was no longer on the active roster but could otherwise fully participate in the program. However, Brown committed to California on May 1. Williams committed to North Carolina on May 2.

On September 9, Beilein announced that Zak Irvin would be sidelined for 6–8 weeks, but that he was expected to be available near the beginning of the season.

The October 15 Preseason Coaches Poll listed five teams from the 2015–16 Big Ten Conference, while three others, including Michigan, were receiving votes. Michigan had the most votes of teams not included in the top 25. Two weeks later the preseason AP Poll included six Big Ten Teams with Michigan listed at number 25. Athlon Sports listed Michigan at 22. Sporting News ranked Michigan at number 18. NBC Sports listed them at 17. ESPN's 10-person panel selected ranked Michigan 22. Blue Ribbon College Basketball Yearbook selected Michigan 17. Sports Illustrated ranked all 351 teams and listed Michigan at 27. The United States Basketball Writers Association (USBWA) ranked Michigan 23.

Caris LeVert was named a preseason All-Big Ten selection, for the second straight year. He was also one of three Big Ten selections to the 20-man Jerry West Award preseason watchlist. He made the initial 50-man John R. Wooden Award watch list on November 17. On December 2, Levert earned recognition on the 50-man Naismith College Player of the Year watchlist and 33-man Oscar Robertson Trophy watchlists. That same day, Albrecht was named an Allstate Good Works Team nominee.

The team hosted its annual media day on October 22. The preseason wound down with an open practice on November 2, followed by a "Squad 100 Selfie" promotion hour. The team had an exhibition game against Le Moyne on November 6, which pitted head coach Beilein's team against that of his son Patrick Beilein. Two days before the exhibition contest, Michigan extended Beilein's contract through the 2020–21 season.

== Schedule ==
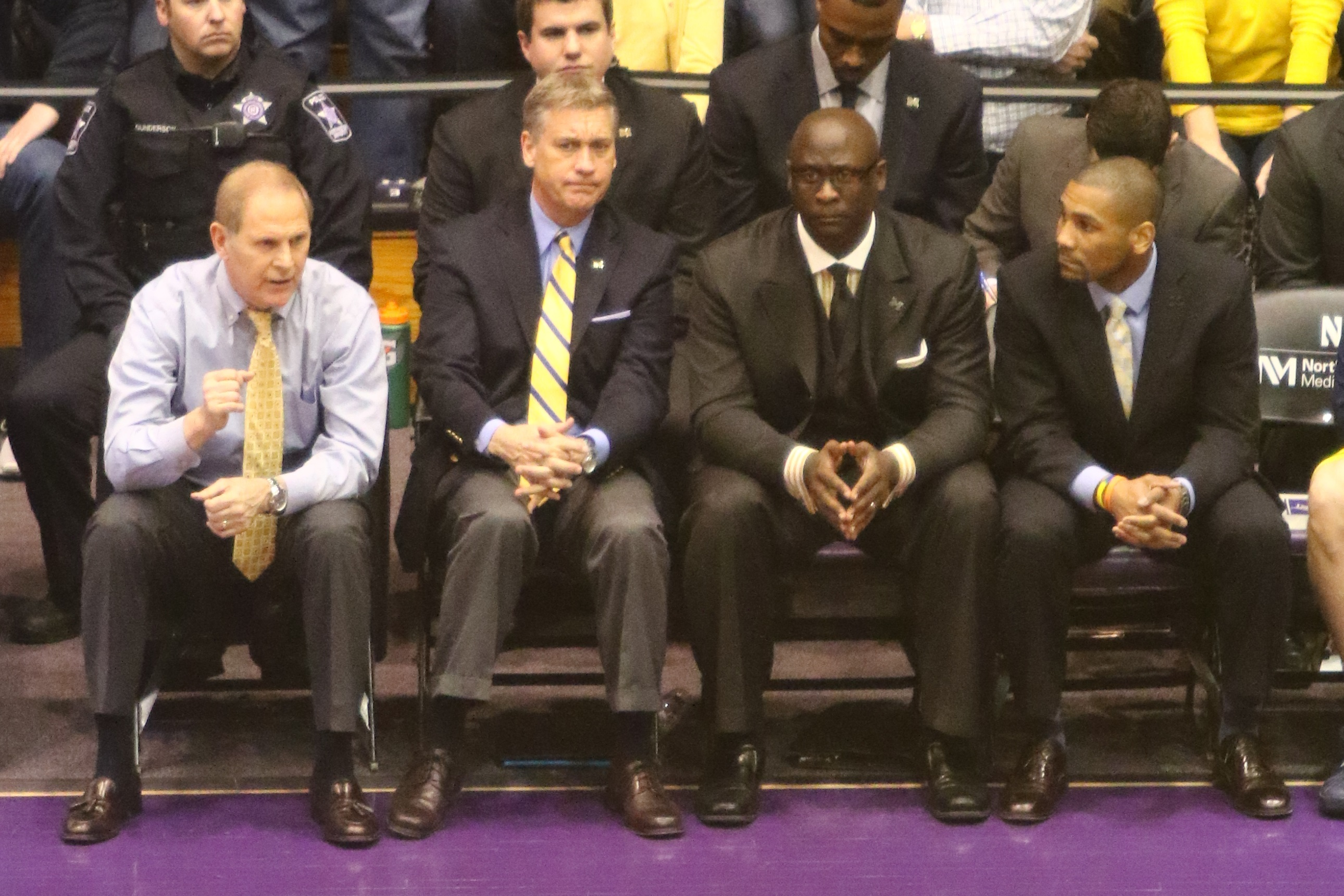
The coaching staff consisted of head coach John Beilein, Jeff Meyer, Bacari Alexander and LaVall Jordan.

The 2015–16 academic year marked 150 years of intercollegiate athletics for the Michigan Wolverines and the 100th season of intercollegiate men's basketball for Michigan Wolverines men's basketball. Michigan participated in the 2015 Battle 4 Atlantis along with Gonzaga, Syracuse, Texas, Texas A&M, UConn, Washington, and Charlotte. Each of these eight teams travelled to the Bahamas for the three-game tournament from November 25–27, 2015, and each team played one game per day. Michigan played Penn State at the Madison Square Garden on January 30, 2016, as part of "Big Ten Day", a day-night doubleheader featuring a hockey and a basketball matchup between both schools. Michigan hosted Xavier in the inaugural Gavitt Tipoff Games on November 20, 2015. As part of a home-and-away with the 2014–15 and 2015–16 SMU teams, Michigan also played SMU in Dallas on December 8, 2015. The Wolverines made a trip to NC State for the ACC-Big Ten Challenge, as well.

November

On November 6, Beilein led the Wolverines over his son Patrick's Le Moyne team 74–52 in the team's only exhibition game as LeVert posted 22 points. Michigan began the regular season with a 70–44 victory over Northern Michigan on November 13. The team was led by LeVert who posted a game-high 18 points and 5 assists in his return to the lineup and Aubrey Dawkins who added 15 points on 6–of–7. However Irvin remained on the sidelines. On November 16, Michigan defeated Elon as Walton led all players with 24 points, six rebounds and seven assists. Duncan Robinson added 19 points including all six shot attempts (5 three point shots). Zak Irvin made his first appearance with three assists. On November 20, Michigan suffered its first loss of the season to Xavier in the inaugural Gavitt Tipoff Games, despite a game-high 29 points by LeVert. Irvin made his first start of the season, scoring seven points and one rebound. During the game, the team unveiled its new logo, "We 100", on its pregame warmups which matched the team hashtag #squad100. Before beginning the 2015 Battle 4 Atlantis in Nassau, Bahamas, Beilein noted that Mark Donnal would not be in the starting lineup going forward. On November 25, Michigan lost to (#18 AP Poll/#21 Coaches Poll) UConn at the Battle 4 Atlantis. After getting off to a 12–5 lead, Michigan fell behind by 36–22 at the half and as much as 19 points in the second half. When Michigan defeated Charlotte 102–47 on November 26, the team set Battle 4 Atlantis records for points, margin of victory and shooting percentage (61%). The game featured freshman Moritz Wagner's 19-point performance on 8–9 shooting from the field. Michigan allowed no second chance points. The team's 55-point victory was the largest for the Wolverines since 1946, when the team defeated Chicago by 58. It was also the largest defeat in Charlotte 49ers men's basketball history and the first time Michigan defeated Charlotte in three tries. Michigan defeated Texas 78–72 on November 27 on 14–25 three point shooting, including 11 in the first half to jump out to a 12-point lead.

December

Michigan defeated NC State 66–59 in the ACC–Big Ten Challenge on December 1. Walton sprained his left ankle in the first half of the game. Michigan defeated Houston Baptist 82–57 on December 5. With Walton sidelined, LeVert started at point guard. On December 8, Michigan lost 82–58 to (19/-) SMU as LeVert slumped on 1–13 field goal shooting. On December 11, Albrecht announced he was ending his college basketball career due to injuries. On December 12, Michigan defeated Delaware State 80–33, as six Wolverines scored in double figures. The last time Michigan had six players in double figures was January 26, 2002, when the 2001–02 Wolverines did so against Vermont. The 33 points allowed by the Wolverines are the lowest since the 2011–12 Wolverines allowed 33 to Ferris State in its season opener on November 11, 2011. Michigan held Delaware State to just 24-percent shooting from the field, the lowest shooting percentage by any Michigan opponent since South Carolina Upstate shot 22.2 percent on November 13, 2010, against the 2010–11 Wolverines. Robinson made his first start of his career, and Andrew Dakich made his season debut. On December 15, Michigan defeated Northern Kentucky 77–62. LeVert finished with 13 points, 10 rebounds and 10 assists, becoming the fourth player in Michigan program history to record a triple-double, and the 49th Wolverine to eclipse 1,000 career points. Walton returned from an ankle injury that sidelined him for three games, and posted 16 points, one rebound, one assist and one steal. On December 19, Michigan defeated Youngstown State 105–46. Walton finished with 10 points, 11 rebounds and 13 assists, becoming the fifth player in Michigan program history to record a triple-double. This was the first time in program history two players recorded triple-doubles in consecutive games. The win was the second largest in school history, behind only the 67–7 victory over Detroit Naval Station in 1919 and the game marked the second time since at least the 1996–97 season that any team had posted back-to-back triple doubles and the first time by different players. Based on his triple double against Northern Kentucky and a 19-point effort against Youngstown State, LeVert earned Co-Big Ten Player of the Week honors (along with Malcolm Hill) on December 21. On December 23, Michigan completed its preconference schedule with a 96–60 victory over Bryant. Michigan surpassed the single-game school record for three-point field goals made with 17, surpassing the previous record of 16 that the 2010–11 Wolverines had last achieved 5 years before to the day against the 2010–11 Bryant Bulldogs. On December 30, Michigan defeated Illinois 78–68 in its Big Ten Conference opener. LeVert posted a 22-point, 10-assist double-double and Mark Donnal had a career night with new career highs in points (26), rebounds (9), blocks (3), and minutes (28).

January

On January 2, Michigan defeated Penn State 79–56. Michigan showed its seventh different starting lineup of the season, as LeVert was out due to a lower left leg injury. The game marked the seventh time this season Michigan had four or more players score in double figures. On January 7, Michigan lost to (#20/#18) Purdue 87–70 in the first of three consecutive games against ranked opponents. Muhammad Ali Abdur Rahkman scored a career-high and game-high 25 points. On January 12 with LeVert still sidelined, Michigan defeated (#3/#3) Maryland 70–67. Irvin posted a season-high and game-high 22 points; Walton had a 12-point/10-rebound double-double and Robinson added 17 points on 5-for-9 three-point shooting. With the win over Maryland, Michigan defeated a top-three nationally ranked opponent at Crisler Center for the first time since the 1997–98 team defeated No. 3 Duke, 81–73, on December 13, 1997. On January 17, Michigan fell to (#16/#19) Iowa 82–71. On January 20, Michigan defeated Minnesota 74–69 behind 22 points by Walton and a 19-point, 11-rebound double-double by Irvin. On January 23, Michigan defeated Nebraska 81–68, behind 21 points by Robinson, and a 19-point, 12-rebound double-double by Walton. Michigan began both halves of the game with hot shooting taking an 18–6 lead in the first half and then building a 33–30 halftime lead into a 54–36 lead by making their first nine shots in the second half. On January 27, Michigan defeated Rutgers, remaining unbeaten in eight all-time meetings against the Scarlet Knights. The win, their 16th victory of the season, matched their total from the 2014–15 season. On January 30, Michigan defeated Penn State 79–72 in the inaugural B1G Super Saturday game at Madison Square Garden. Walton posted 13 points, 10 rebounds, and seven assists, recording his second double-double in the last three games.

February

After building an early 11-point lead on February 2, Michigan eventually went scoreless for the final 9:05 of the first half as (#22/21) Indiana scored the final 25 points of the half on way to an 80–67 victory. Entering the February 6 rivalry game against (#10/10) Michigan State, Michigan had posted a 1–5 record against top 25 teams, with 5 double digit losses. In the game, Michigan endured back-to-back defeats for the second time this season, losing 89–73 despite a 19–9 turnover margin including a season high 11 steals. On February 10, Michigan defeated Minnesota behind a career-high 26 points by Walton and a perfect shooting night from Abdur-Rakman (5-for-5 from the field and 3-for-3 from the line) for 16 points. On February 13, Michigan defeated (#18/16) Purdue, 61–56. Irvin scored 16 of his game-high 22 points in the second half, as the Wolverines finished the game on an 11–0 scoring run after falling behind 56–50 with three minutes to play. After missing the previous 11 games, LeVert recorded five rebounds and one assist in 11 minutes. Michigan commemorated the 100th anniversary of Wolverines basketball during a celebration at the game. On February 16, Michigan lost to Ohio State 76–66. Irvin finished with 15 points, nine rebounds, three assists, and two steals, becoming the 50th Wolverine to eclipse 1,000 career points. On February 21, Michigan lost to (#5/6) Maryland 82–86, despite a game-high 25 points and five blocks from Donnal. On February 24, Michigan defeated Northwestern 72–63. Michigan fell behind early after it had a scoring drought of nearly six minutes to open the game, as they missed its first eight shots. They finished the first half shooting 12-of-17 from the field to cut Northwestern's lead from 11 points to one. On February 28, Michigan lost to Wisconsin 68–57, in their final road game of the season. Michigan was held to a season-low for 3-point attempts in going 5-of-13.

March

On March 1, the team announced that LeVert would sit out the remainder of the season to concentrate on his continued recovery after suffering a lower left leg injury at the end of December. On March 5, Michigan lost to (#15/#16) Iowa, 71–61, in their Big Ten Conference finale, to finish the regular season at 20–11 (11–8 Big Ten). Prior to the game for senior night, Michigan celebrated the accomplishments and careers of seniors Spike Albrecht and Caris LeVert, whose senior seasons were both cut short due to injuries. Freshman Fred Wright-Jones, who has been a manager and practice player the entire season, was allowed to suit up for the game.

Postseason

After a bye in the first round of the 2016 Big Ten Conference men's basketball tournament, Michigan played Northwestern on March 10. Michigan scored 16 consecutive points early to take a 16–3 lead. Northwestern cut the lead to two points before Michigan took a nine-point lead into the half. Michigan opened up a 12-point lead a couple of times in the second half before Northwestern took a 55–54 lead with 3:27 remaining. On Northwestern's final possession of regulation, Alex Olah forced overtime with a rebound and a field goal. In overtime, Robinson made a three-point shot to tie the score at 70 with 46.5 seconds remaining. Irvin scored the game-winning basket in front of his hometown crowd at Bankers Life Fieldhouse with 3.3 seconds left. Robinson led the way with 21 points; while Irvin added 19 points and eight rebounds and Abdur-Rahkman posted 14 points. This was just the second overtime game in Michigan's Big Ten tournament history. Michigan defeated Purdue, 79–73, on March 14, 1999. The game marked Irvin's 100th career game with Michigan, becoming just the 64th Wolverine to reach the milestone. On March 11, Michigan defeated No. 1-seeded (#10/#10) Indiana in the quarterfinals of the Big Ten tournament, 72–69. Kameron Chatman scored the game-winning three-pointer as time expired to give the Wolverines the win. Irvin led the way with a team-high 17 points, while Walton set a Big Ten tournament single-game record with 12 assists. Robinson again put Michigan in position to win by tying the score with a three-point shot with 46 seconds remaining. Michigan recorded six three-pointers in the game, to set a new single-season program record for three-pointers in a season with 320, surpassing the previous record of 319 set during the 2013–14 season. On March 12, Michigan lost to (#13/#13) Purdue in the semifinals of the Big Ten tournament, 76–59. Purdue opened the game with an 8–0 scoring run and took a 38–30 lead into halftime. After trailing by as many as 17 early in the second half, the Wolverines fought back to within six only to be outscored 16–5 in the last 7:35 of the game. Abdur-Rahkman led the way with 15 points, while Walton added 14 points and Irvin posted 11 points. Michigan recorded six three-pointers in the game to extend their single-season record for three-pointers in a season to 326. With five assists in the game, Walton is now tied for third-most assists in a single Big Ten tournament with 22, with Brent Darby (2003). Robinson recorded his 90th three-pointer of the season, becoming just the fifth Wolverine in history to reach the milestone in a single season. Irvin was selected to the All-Tournament Team.

On March 13, Michigan received an at-large bid to the 2016 NCAA tournament. The Wolverines are the No. 11 seed in the East Region and faced No. 11 Tulsa in the First Four on March 16 in Dayton, Ohio. Michigan is in the tournament field for the fifth time in the last six seasons after missing out on the 2015 tournament field. Beilein's Wolverines advanced to the national title game in 2013 and followed with an Elite Eight performance in 2014. Michigan is one of three Big Ten teams in the east region (along with Wisconsin and Indiana). On March 16 in the First Four, Michigan defeated Tulsa, 67–62, to advance to the First Round of the NCAA Tournament. After falling behind 16–9, Michigan ended the first half on a 19–4 scoring run to take an eight-point lead into halftime. Irvin hit the go-ahead three-pointer with 53 seconds left to put the Wolverines up by two points. Michigan was led by Abdur-Rahkman and Irvin with 16 points, while Robinson recorded his first double-double with 13 points and 11 rebounds. The game was the first-ever meeting between the two teams in program history. Michigan recorded six three-pointers in the game to extend their single-season record for three-pointers in a season to 332. On March 18, Michigan lost to No. 6 seed Notre Dame, 70–63. Michigan finished the first half on a 7–0 run to take a 41–29 lead at halftime. Notre Dame came out with a 15–5 run to start the second half, cutting Michigan's lead to three points. Notre Dame did not take a lead in the game until Beacham's three-pointer with 9:26 left to make it 51–48. From there on there were five lead changes and three ties. Abdur-Rahkman led Michigan in scoring with 15 points, four rebounds, three assists and one steal, while Walton recorded a career-high six steals, along with 10 points, eight assists and four rebounds. Michigan recorded 10 three-pointers in the game to extend their single-season record for three-pointers in a season to 342.

Date time, TV	Rank^{#}	Opponent^{#}	Result	Record	High points	High rebounds	High assists	Site (attendance) city, state
Exhibition
Nov 6*; 7:00 pm	No. 25	Le Moyne	W 74–52	–	22 – LeVert	5 – 2 tied	4 – Chatman	Crisler Center (10,699); Ann Arbor, MI
Non-conference regular season
Nov 13*; 7:00 pm	No. 25	Northern Michigan	W 70–44	1–0	18 – LeVert	6 – Dawkins	5 – LeVert	Crisler Center (10,267); Ann Arbor, MI
Nov 16*; 7:00 pm, ESPN3	No. 24	Elon; Battle 4 Atlantis Mainland	W 88–68	2–0	24 – Walton	6 – Walton	7 – 2 tied	Crisler Center (9,716); Ann Arbor, MI
Nov 20*; 9:00 pm, BTN	No. 24	Xavier; Gavitt Tipoff Games	L 70–86	2–1	29 – LeVert	7 – LeVert	3 – LeVert	Crisler Center (11,967); Ann Arbor, MI
Nov 25*; 9:30 pm, AXS TV		vs. No. 18 UConn; Battle 4 Atlantis Quarterfinals	L 60–74	2–2	21 – LeVert	7 – Irvin	2 – 3 tied	Imperial Arena (2,491); Nassau, BS
Nov 26*; 9:30 pm, AXS TV		vs. Charlotte; Battle 4 Atlantis	W 102–47	3–2	19 – Wagner	8 – 2 tied	5 – LeVert	Imperial Arena (1,339); Nassau, BS
Nov 27*; 7:00 pm, AXS TV		vs. Texas; Battle 4 Atlantis	W 78–72	4–2	19 – LeVert	5 – Walton	7 – Walton	Imperial Arena (1,357); Nassau, BS
Dec 1*; 7:00 pm, ESPN2		at NC State; ACC-Big Ten Challenge	W 66–59	5–2	18 – LeVert	9 – LeVert	7 – LeVert	PNC Arena (17,645); Raleigh, NC
Dec 5*; 2:00 pm, ESPNU		Houston Baptist	W 82–57	6–2	25 – LeVert	8 – LeVert	5 – Irvin	Crisler Center (11,399); Ann Arbor, MI
Dec 8*; 9:00 pm, ESPN2		at No. 19 SMU	L 58–82	6–3	15 – 2 tied	4 – 2 tied	9 – Irvin	Moody Coliseum (7,245); Dallas, TX
Dec 12*; 12:00 pm, ESPNU		Delaware State	W 80–33	7–3	15 – LeVert	8 – Irvin	5 – LeVert	Crisler Center (10,599); Ann Arbor, MI
Dec 15*; 7:00 pm, BTN		Northern Kentucky	W 77–62	8–3	18 – Robinson	10 – LeVert	10 – LeVert	Crisler Center (10,424); Ann Arbor, MI
Dec 19*; 6:00 pm, ESPN3		Youngstown State	W 105–46	9–3	19 – 2 tied	11 – Walton	13 – Walton	Crisler Center (10,752); Ann Arbor, MI
Dec 23*; 7:00 pm, BTN		Bryant	W 96–60	10–3	19 – LeVert	6 – 2 tied	8 – LeVert	Crisler Center (11,491); Ann Arbor, MI
Big Ten regular season
Dec 30; 3:00 pm, ESPN2		at Illinois	W 78–68	11–3 (1–0)	26 – Donnal	9 – 2 tied	10 – LeVert	State Farm Center (13,974); Champaign, IL
Jan 2; 12:00 pm, BTN		Penn State	W 79–56	12–3 (2–0)	16 – 2 tied	8 – Donnal	7 – Irvin	Crisler Center (12,707); Ann Arbor, MI
Jan 7; 7:00 pm, ESPNU		at No. 20 Purdue	L 70–87	12–4 (2–1)	25 – Abdur-Rahkman	6 – Walton	3 – Irvin	Mackey Arena (13,063); West Lafayette, IN
Jan 12; 9:00 pm, ESPN		No. 3 Maryland	W 70–67	13–4 (3–1)	22 – Irvin	10 – Walton	4 – 2 tied	Crisler Center (12,327); Ann Arbor, MI
Jan 17; 4:30 pm, BTN		at No. 16 Iowa	L 71–82	13–5 (3–2)	16 – Walton	8 – Irvin	6 – Walton	Carver–Hawkeye Arena (15,400); Iowa City, IA
Jan 20; 8:30 pm, BTN		Minnesota	W 74–69	14–5 (4–2)	22 – Walton	11 – Irvin	3 – Irvin	Crisler Center (11,726); Ann Arbor, MI
Jan 23; 2:00 pm, ESPN2		at Nebraska	W 81–68	15–5 (5–2)	21 – Robinson	12 – Walton	6 – Walton	Pinnacle Bank Arena (15,745); Lincoln, NE
Jan 27; 7:00 pm, BTN		Rutgers	W 68–57	16–5 (6–2)	18 – Robinson	12 – Irvin	8 – Irvin	Crisler Center (11,519); Ann Arbor, MI
Jan 30; 12:00 pm, BTN		vs. Penn State; B1G Super Saturday	W 79–72	17–5 (7–2)	20 – Irvin	10 – Walton	7 – Walton	Madison Square Garden (12,108); Manhattan, NY
Feb 2; 9:00 pm, ESPN		No. 22 Indiana	L 67–80	17–6 (7–3)	16 – Irvin	4 – 2 tied	4 – Irvin	Crisler Center (12,312); Ann Arbor, MI
Feb 6; 2:00 pm, CBS		No. 10 Michigan State; Rivalry	L 73–89	17–7 (7–4)	19 – Irvin	3 – 3 tied	4 – Abdur-Rahkman	Crisler Center (12,707); Ann Arbor, MI
Feb 10; 9:00 pm, BTN		at Minnesota	W 82–74	18–7 (8–4)	26 – Walton	9 – Robinson	7 – Walton	Williams Arena (11,137); Minneapolis, MN
Feb 13; 2:00 pm, ESPN2		No. 18 Purdue	W 61–56	19–7 (9–4)	22 – Irvin	7 – Walton	2 – 2 tied	Crisler Center (12,707); Ann Arbor, MI
Feb 16; 7:00 pm, ESPN		at Ohio State	L 66–76	19–8 (9–5)	17 – Donnal	9 – Irvin	5 – Walton	Value City Arena (17,088); Columbus, OH
Feb 21; 1:00 pm, CBS		at No. 6 Maryland	L 82–86	19–9 (9–6)	25 – Donnal	9 – Robinson	9 – Abdur-Rahkman	Xfinity Center (17,950); College Park, MD
Feb 24; 7:00 pm, BTN		Northwestern	W 72–63	20–9 (10–6)	19 – Abdur-Rahkman	7 – Dawkins	3 – Walton	Crisler Center (12,071); Ann Arbor, MI
Feb 28; 6:00 pm, BTN		at Wisconsin	L 57–68	20–10 (10–7)	14 – Irvin	8 – Irvin	7 – Walton	Kohl Center (17,287); Madison, WI
Mar 5; 8:00 pm, BTN		No. 16 Iowa	L 61–71	20–11 (10–8)	14 – Walton	10 – Donnal	6 – Walton	Crisler Center (12,707); Ann Arbor, MI
Big Ten tournament
Mar 10; 12:00 pm, BTN	(8)	vs. (9) Northwestern; Second Round	W 72–70 ^{OT}	21–11	21 – Robinson	8 – 2-tied	5 – Walton	Bankers Life Fieldhouse (15,707); Indianapolis, IN
Mar 11; 12:00 pm, ESPN	(8)	vs. (1) No. 10 Indiana; Quarterfinals	W 72–69	22–11	17 – Irvin	5 – Irvin	12 – Walton	Bankers Life Fieldhouse (18,355); Indianapolis, IN
Mar 12; 1:00 pm, CBS	(8)	vs. (4) No. 13 Purdue; Semifinals	L 59–76	22–12	15 – Abdur-Rahkman	6 – Walton	5 – Walton	Bankers Life Fieldhouse (18,339); Indianapolis, IN
NCAA tournament
Mar 16*; 9:10 pm, truTV	(11 E)	vs. (11 E) Tulsa; First Four	W 67–62	23–12	16 – 2-tied	11 – Robinson	4 – Robinson	UD Arena (12,582); Dayton, OH
Mar 18*; 9:40 pm, CBS	(11 E)	vs. (6 E) Notre Dame; First Round	L 63–70	23–13	15 – Abdur-Rahkman	4 – 4-tied	8 – Walton	Barclays Center (17,502); Brooklyn, NY
*Non-conference game. ^{#}Rankings from AP Poll. (#) Tournament seedings in parentheses. E=East Region. All times are in Eastern Time.

== Statistics ==
The team posted the following statistics:

Name	GP	GS	Min.	Avg.	FG	FGA	FG%	3FG	3FGA	3FG%	FT	FTA	FT%	OR	DR	RB	Avg.	Ast.	Avg.	PF	DQ	TO	Stl.	Blk.	Pts.	Avg.
Zak Irvin	35	34	1151	32.9	157	386	0.407	48	161	0.298	50	76	0.658	17	140	157	4.5	107	3.1	40	0	65	27	1	412	11.8
Duncan Robinson	36	27	1040	28.9	134	293	0.457	95	211	0.45	39	44	0.886	22	104	126	3.5	65	1.8	81	0	36	23	8	402	11.2
Derrick Walton Jr.	33	33	1108	33.6	115	305	0.377	63	163	0.387	91	112	0.812	17	162	179	5.4	147	4.5	64	1	67	59	3	384	11.6
M-A Abdur-Rahkman	36	25	1001	27.8	116	253	0.458	31	85	0.365	48	68	0.706	22	76	98	2.7	61	1.7	59	1	27	22	9	311	8.6
Mark Donnal	34	25	659	19.4	104	181	0.575	10	33	0.303	47	66	0.712	59	68	127	3.7	12	0.4	84	1	24	12	25	265	7.8
Caris LeVert	15	14	464	30.9	82	162	0.506	29	65	0.446	54	68	0.794	9	71	80	5.3	74	4.9	18	0	25	15	3	247	16.5
Aubrey Dawkins	36	9	568	15.8	85	170	0.5	44	100	0.44	21	29	0.724	23	66	89	2.5	18	0.5	45	0	21	16	5	235	6.5
Ricky Doyle	36	11	438	12.2	52	81	0.642	0	0		33	52	0.635	32	39	71	2	2	0.1	64	0	22	3	7	137	3.8
Moritz Wagner	30	0	258	8.6	37	61	0.607	2	12	0.167	10	18	0.556	20	28	48	1.6	4	0.1	47	0	16	6	6	86	2.9
Kameron Chatman	28	2	201	7.2	29	76	0.382	9	34	0.265	11	15	0.733	16	22	38	1.4	14	0.5	22	0	7	6	4	78	2.8
D. J. Wilson	26	0	158	6.1	27	57	0.474	8	24	0.333	8	11	0.727	4	14	18	0.7	8	0.3	21	0	9	5	10	70	2.7
Spike Albrecht	8	0	69	8.6	4	11	0.364	2	7	0.286	5	7	0.714	1	5	6	0.8	11	1.4	2	0	1	3	0	15	1.9
Andrew Dakich	24	0	110	4.6	5	12	0.417	1	6	0.167	3	3	1	3	13	16	0.7	14	0.6	11	0	8	6	0	14	0.6
TEAM	36													45	54	99	2.8					20				
Season Total	36				947	2048	0.462	342	901	0.38	420	569	0.738	290	862	1152	32	537	14.9	558	3	348	203	81	2656	73.8
Opponents	36				894	1995	0.448	251	725	0.346	387	534	0.725	311	880	1191	33.1	472	13.1	580		433	146	114	2426	67.4

== Roster ==
Donnal was reclassified from redshirt sophomore to junior at Michigan at the beginning of the season, indicating that he might not use all of his three remaining years of eligibility at Michigan.

2015–16 Michigan Wolverines men's basketball team
Players
Coaches

Pos.	#	Name	Height	Weight	Year	Hometown
F	0	Brent Hibbits (W)	6 ft 8 in (2.03 m)	190 lb (86 kg)	Fr	Hudsonville, MI
G	2	Spike Albrecht (C)	5 ft 11 in (1.8 m)	175 lb (79 kg)	Sr	Crown Point, IN
G/F	3	Kameron Chatman	6 ft 8 in (2.03 m)	215 lb (98 kg)	So	Portland, OR
F	5	D. J. Wilson	6 ft 9 in (2.06 m)	240 lb (109 kg)	RS Fr	Sacramento, CA
G	10	Derrick Walton	6 ft 1 in (1.85 m)	190 lb (86 kg)	Jr	Detroit, MI
G	11	Andrew Dakich (W)	6 ft 2 in (1.88 m)	190 lb (86 kg)	Jr	Zionsville, IN
G	12	Muhammad Ali Abdur-Rahkman	6 ft 4 in (1.93 m)	185 lb (84 kg)	So	Allentown, PA
F	13	Moritz Wagner	6 ft 10 in (2.08 m)	225 lb (102 kg)	Fr	Berlin, Germany
F	20	Sean Lonergan (W)	6 ft 5 in (1.96 m)	210 lb (95 kg)	Jr	Fishers, IN
G/F	21	Zak Irvin	6 ft 6 in (1.98 m)	215 lb (98 kg)	Jr	Fishers, IN
G/F	22	Duncan Robinson	6 ft 8 in (2.03 m)	210 lb (95 kg)	RS So	New Castle, NH
G	23	Caris LeVert (C)	6 ft 7 in (2.01 m)	205 lb (93 kg)	Sr	Pickerington, OH
G/F	24	Aubrey Dawkins	6 ft 6 in (1.98 m)	205 lb (93 kg)	So	Palo Alto, CA
F	32	Ricky Doyle	6 ft 9 in (2.06 m)	250 lb (113 kg)	So	Cape Coral, FL
F	34	Mark Donnal	6 ft 9 in (2.06 m)	240 lb (109 kg)	RS So	Monclova, OH

Head coach

- John Beilein (Wheeling)

Assistant coach(es)

- Jeff Meyer (Taylor)
- LaVall Jordan (Butler)
- Bacari Alexander (Detroit Mercy)

Legend

- (C) Team captain
- (S) Suspended
- (I) Ineligible
- (W) Walk-on
- Injured
- Current redshirt

Roster

=== Coaching staff ===
Name	Position	Year at Michigan	Alma mater (year)
John Beilein	Head coach	9th	Wheeling Jesuit (1975)
Jeff Meyer	Assistant coach	8th	Taylor (1976)
Bacari Alexander	Assistant coach	6th	Detroit (1999)
LaVall Jordan	Assistant coach	6th	Butler (2001)
Jon Sanderson	Strength and conditioning coach	7th	Ohio (2001)

Support staff
Peter Kahler – director of basketball operations
Chris Hunter – director of player personnel
Will Vergollo – video analyst
Bryan Smothers – graduate manager

== Rankings ==
Ranking movements Legend: ██ Increase in ranking ██ Decrease in ranking — = Not ranked RV = Received votes
	Week																			
Poll	Pre	1	2	3	4	5	6	7	8	9	10	11	12	13	14	15	16	17	18	Final
AP	25	24	RV	—	—	—	—	—	RV	—	—	RV	RV	RV	RV	—	—	—	RV	Not released
Coaches'	RV	25	RV	—	—	—	—	—	—	—	RV	RV	RV	—	RV	RV	—	—	—	—

== Midseason recognition ==
LeVert was one of four Big Ten athletes (along with Melo Trimble, Jarrod Uthoff and Denzel Valentine) among the 25 players included in the Wooden Award Midseason Top 25 Watch List on January 13. On February 2, LeVert was one of two Big Ten athletes (along with Malcolm Hill) named one of 10 finalists for the Jerry West Award, despite having missed the last 8 of Michigan's 22 games.

== Honors ==
Following the 2015–16 Big Ten season, Walton was listed as a third team All-Big Ten selection by the coaches and an honorable mention All-Big Ten selection by the media, while Irvin was an honorable mention selection by both. Max Bielfeldt, who left the team prior to the season, was voted the Sixth Man of the Year by the coaches for his contributions to the regular season champion Indiana Hoosiers. Irvin was selected to the 2016 Big Ten Conference men's basketball tournament All-Tournament Team. Following the season, Levert was invited to the NBA Draft Combine.

=== Team players drafted into the NBA ===
LeVert was selected with the 20th overall pick in the 2016 NBA Draft by the Indiana Pacers, however his draft rights were traded to the Brooklyn Nets along with a future protected 2nd round pick in return for forward Thaddeus Young. LeVert became Michigan's 5th first round draft selection since 2013 and the fourth player drafted from Michigan's 2012 entering class.

Year	Round	Pick	Overall	Player	NBA club
2016	1	20	20	Caris LeVert	Indiana Pacers
2017	1	17	17	D. J. Wilson	Milwaukee Bucks
2018	1	25	25	Moritz Wagner	Los Angeles Lakers
