= B1G Super Saturday =

B1G Super Saturday is an annual college sports doubleheader that is played between two basketball and two hockey or wrestling schools of the Big Ten Conference at Madison Square Garden that began in 2016. Michigan and Penn State participated in the inaugural Super Saturday event for both basketball and hockey. It is presented by Discount Tire.

== Men's basketball ==
=== Past results ===
Date	Location	Winning team		Losing team		Attendance
January 30, 2016	Madison Square Garden (New York, NY)	Michigan	79	Penn State	72	12,108
January 28, 2017	Madison Square Garden (New York, NY)	#15 Wisconsin	61	Rutgers	54^{OT}	8,531
January 20, 2018	Madison Square Garden (New York, NY)	#22 Ohio State	67	Minnesota	49	4,136
January 26, 2019	Madison Square Garden (New York, NY)	Illinois	78	#13 Maryland	67	7,239
February 1, 2020	Madison Square Garden (New York, NY)	Michigan	69	#25 Rutgers	63	13,127
February 4, 2023	Madison Square Garden (New York, NY)	Rutgers	61	Michigan State	55	14,844

== Ice hockey ==
=== Past results ===
Date	Location	Winning team		Losing team		Attendance
January 30, 2016	Madison Square Garden (New York, NY)	#6 Michigan	6	#15 Penn State	3	13,479
January 28, 2017	Madison Square Garden (New York, NY)	Wisconsin	3	#8 Ohio State	2^{OT}	5,002
January 20, 2018	Madison Square Garden (New York, NY)	#13 Minnesota	2	Michigan State	1	3,883
January 26, 2019	Madison Square Garden (New York, NY)	#15 Penn State	5	Michigan	2	9,271

== Wrestling ==
=== Past results ===
Date	Location	Winning team		Losing team		Attendance
February 1, 2020	Madison Square Garden (New York, NY)	#25 Michigan	21	#23 Rutgers	16	
