= 2015–16 Wisconsin Badgers men's basketball team =

American college basketball season

2015–16 Wisconsin Badgers men's basketball

NCAA tournament, Sweet Sixteen
- Conference: Big Ten Conference

Ranking
- Coaches: No. 23
- Record: 22–13 (12–6 Big Ten)
- Head coach: Bo Ryan (15th season; first 12 games); Greg Gard (remainder of season)
- Associate head coach: Greg Gard
- Assistant coaches: Gary Close; Lamont Paris; Howard Moore (23 games)
- Home arena: Kohl Center

2015–16 Big Ten Conference men's basketball standings
	Conf.				Overall
Team	W		L	PCT	W		L	PCT
No. 14 Indiana	15	–	3	.833	27	–	8	.771
No. 2 Michigan State †	13	–	5	.722	29	–	6	.829
No. 18 Maryland	12	–	6	.667	27	–	9	.750
No. 12 Purdue	12	–	6	.667	26	–	9	.743
No. 25 Iowa	12	–	6	.667	22	–	11	.667
Wisconsin	12	–	6	.667	22	–	13	.629
Ohio State	11	–	7	.611	21	–	14	.600
Michigan	10	–	8	.556	23	–	13	.639
Northwestern	8	–	10	.444	20	–	12	.625
Penn State	7	–	11	.389	16	–	16	.500
Nebraska	6	–	12	.333	16	–	18	.471
Illinois	5	–	13	.278	15	–	19	.441
Minnesota	2	–	16	.111	11	–	20	.355
Rutgers	1	–	17	.056	7	–	25	.219
† 2016 Big Ten tournament winner Rankings from AP poll

The 2015–16 Wisconsin Badgers men's basketball team represented the University of Wisconsin–Madison in the 2015–16 NCAA Division I men's basketball season. This was Bo Ryan's 15th season as head coach at Wisconsin, before he resigned 12 games into the season. On December 15, 2015, Ryan announced he would retire effective immediately leaving associate head coach Greg Gard as interim head coach. The team played their home games at the Kohl Center and were members of the Big Ten Conference. They finished the season 22–13, 12–6 in Big Ten play to finish in a four-way tie for third place in conference. Shortly after the regular season, Greg Gard had the interim tag removed as he was announced as the permanent head coach. The Badgers were upset by Nebraska in the second round of the Big Ten tournament. They received an at-large bid to the NCAA tournament, their 18th straight appearance in the Tournament. They defeated Pittsburgh and Xavier to advance to the Sweet Sixteen for the third consecutive year. In the Sweet Sixteen, they lost to Notre Dame.

== Previous season ==
The Badgers finished the 2014–15 season with a record of 36–4, 16–2 in Big Ten play to win the Big Ten regular season championship. They defeated Michigan, Purdue, and Michigan State to win the Big Ten tournament and earn an automatic bid to the NCAA tournament. This marked the Badgers' 17th straight trip to the Tournament. In the Tournament, they defeated Coastal Carolina and Oregon to advance to their second straight Sweet Sixteen. They defeated North Carolina and Arizona to reach the school's fourth Final Four. By upsetting unbeaten and No. 1-ranked Kentucky 71–64 in the Final Four in Indianapolis, the Badgers moved on to play Duke in the National Championship Game, going for their first title in 74 years. However, Wisconsin lost the game 68–63.

== Departures ==
Name	Number	Pos.	Height	Weight	Year	Hometown	Notes
Traevon Jackson	12	G	6'3"	207	Senior	Westerville, OH	Graduated/Signed by Washington Wizards
Duje Dukan	13	F	6'10"	218	RS Senior	Deerfield, IL	Graduated/Signed by Sacramento Kings
Sam Dekker	15	F	6'9"	230	Junior	Sheboygan, WI	Declared for NBA draft/Drafted 18th overall by Houston Rockets
Josh Gasser	21	G	6'4"	192	RS Senior	Port Washington, WI	Graduated/Signed by Brooklyn Nets
Riley Dearring	35	G	6'5"	181	RS Sophomore	Minnetonka, MN	Transferred (midseason)
Frank Kaminsky	44	F	7'0"	242	Senior	Lisle, IL	Graduated/Drafted 9th overall by Charlotte Hornets

== 2015 commitments ==
College recruiting
Name	Hometown	School	Height	Weight	Commit date
Alex Illikainen; SF	Grand Rapids, MN	Brewster Academy	6 ft 8 in (2.03 m)	225 lb (102 kg)	Sep 21, 2014
Alex Illikainen; SF	Recruit ratings: Scout: Rivals: 247Sports: ESPN:				
Brevin Pritzl; SG	De Pere, WI	De Pere	6 ft 3 in (1.91 m)	185 lb (84 kg)	May 22, 2014
Brevin Pritzl; SG	Recruit ratings: Scout: Rivals: 247Sports: ESPN:				
Charlie Thomas; PF	Clarksville, MD	River Hill	6 ft 8 in (2.03 m)	245 lb (111 kg)	Oct 14, 2014
Charlie Thomas; PF	Recruit ratings: Scout: Rivals: 247Sports: ESPN:				
Khalil Iverson; SF	Delaware, OH	Rutherford B. Hayes	6 ft 4 in (1.93 m)	190 lb (86 kg)	Feb 12, 2015
Khalil Iverson; SF	Recruit ratings: Scout: Rivals: 247Sports: ESPN:				
Andy Van Vliet; PF	Belgium	Canarias Basketball Academy	6 ft 10 in (2.08 m)	190 lb (86 kg)	May 11, 2015
Andy Van Vliet; PF	Recruit ratings: Scout: Rivals: 247Sports: ESPN:				
Overall recruit ranking:
Note: In many cases, Scout, Rivals, 247Sports, On3, and ESPN may conflict in their listings of height and weight.; In these cases, the average was taken. ESPN grades are on a 100-point scale.; Sources: "2015 Wisconsin Commitments". Rivals.; "Men's Basketball Recruiting". Scout.; "ESPN- Wisconsin Badgers Men's Basketball Recruiting". ESPN.; "Scout.com Team Recruiting Rankings". Scout.; "2015 Team Ranking". Rivals.

== Roster ==
2015–16 Wisconsin Badgers men's basketball team
Players
Coaches

Pos.	#	Name	Height	Weight	Year	Hometown
G	0	Will Decorah (W)	6 ft 4 in (1.93 m)	205 lb (93 kg)	Jr	Waunakee, WI
G	1	Brevin Pritzl (redshirt)	6 ft 3 in (1.91 m)	185 lb (84 kg)	Fr	De Pere, WI
G	2	Jordan Smith	6 ft 3 in (1.91 m)	181 lb (82 kg)	RS Sr	Orono, MN
G	3	Zak Showalter	6 ft 2 in (1.88 m)	184 lb (83 kg)	RS Jr	Germantown, WI
G	4	Matt Ferris (W) (redshirt)	6 ft 6 in (1.98 m)	196 lb (89 kg)	So	Appleton, WI
F	5	Aaron Moesch (W)	6 ft 8 in (2.03 m)	211 lb (96 kg)	RS So	Green Bay, WI
F	10	Nigel Hayes	6 ft 8 in (2.03 m)	240 lb (109 kg)	Jr	Toledo, OH
G	11	Jordan Hill	6 ft 3 in (1.91 m)	178 lb (81 kg)	RS So	Pasadena, CA
G	13	Jackson Bax (W)	5 ft 11 in (1.8 m)	157 lb (71 kg)	Fr	Frankfort, IL
F	15	Charlie Thomas	6 ft 8 in (2.03 m)	253 lb (115 kg)	Fr	Highland, MD
G	20	T.J. Schlundt (W)	6 ft 5 in (1.96 m)	194 lb (88 kg)	RS Fr	Oconomowoc, WI
G/F	21	Khalil Iverson	6 ft 5 in (1.96 m)	205 lb (93 kg)	Fr	Delaware, OH
F	22	Ethan Happ	6 ft 9 in (2.06 m)	235 lb (107 kg)	RS Fr	Milan, IL
G	24	Bronson Koenig	6 ft 4 in (1.93 m)	193 lb (88 kg)	Jr	La Crosse, WI
F	25	Alex Illikainen	6 ft 9 in (2.06 m)	220 lb (100 kg)	Fr	Grand Rapids, MN
F	30	Vitto Brown	6 ft 8 in (2.03 m)	230 lb (104 kg)	Jr	Bowling Green, OH
F	33	Andy Van Vliet (I)	6 ft 11 in (2.11 m)	203 lb (92 kg)	Fr	Belgium
G	35	Riley Dearring	6 ft 5 in (1.96 m)	181 lb (82 kg)	RS So	Minnetonka, MN

Head coach

- Bo Ryan (Wilkes) (First 12 games)
- Greg Gard (UW–Platteville) (Interim)

Assistant coach(es)

- Gary Close (Arizona State)
- Lamont Paris (Wooster)
- Howard Moore (UW–Madison)

Legend

- (C) Team captain
- (S) Suspended
- (I) Ineligible
- (W) Walk-on
- Injured
- Current redshirt

Roster

== Season news ==
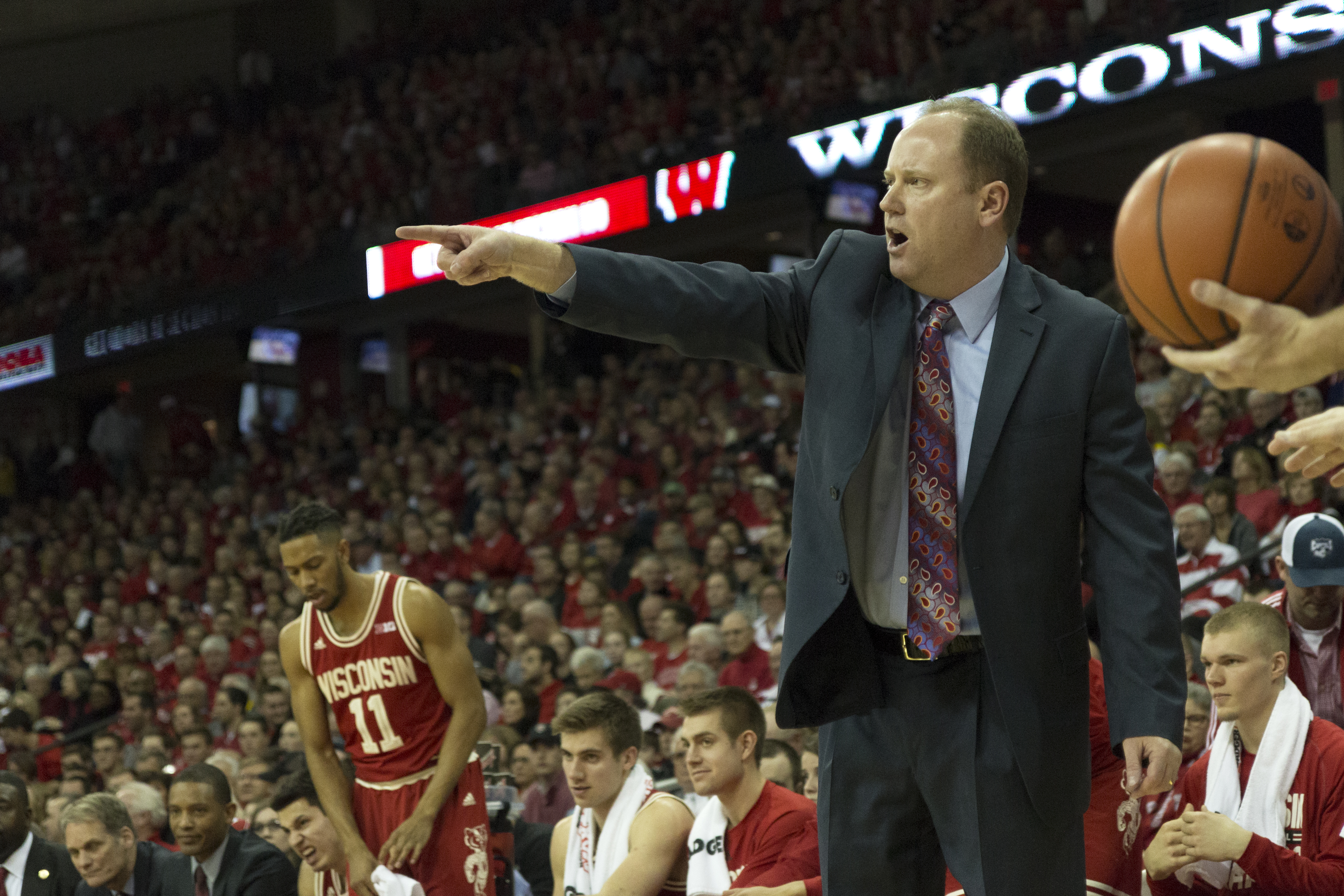
Greg Gard coaching the Badgers at the last home game of the season against Michigan

The first major news of the 2015–16 season came on June 29, 2015, when head coach Bo Ryan announced he would retire at the end of the season. However, on August 13, he backed away from his previous announcement, telling reporters that he would make a final decision by the end of 2015.

On December 15, 2015, following a win over Texas A&M Corpus Christi in Madison, Ryan announced he would be retiring effective immediately. Assistant Coach Greg Gard was named as interim head coach.

== Schedule and results ==
Date time, TV	Rank^{#}	Opponent^{#}	Result	Record	High points	High rebounds	High assists	Site (attendance) city, state
Exhibition
Nov 4*; 7:00 pm	No. 17	UW–River Falls	W 101–46	–	16 – Tied	10 – Happ	6 – Hayes	Kohl Center (17,213); Madison, WI
Non-conference regular season
Nov 13*; 8:00 pm, BTN	No. 17	Western Illinois	L 67–69	0–1	17 – Tied	7 – Iverson	4 – Hayes	Kohl Center (17,287); Madison, WI
Nov 15*; 7:00 pm, ESPNU	No. 17	Siena; 2K Sports Classic	W 92–65	1–1	23 – Koenig	7 – Brown	4 – Tied	Kohl Center (17,287); Madison, WI
Nov 17*; 7:00 pm, ESPN3		North Dakota	W 78–64	2–1	17 – Tied	7 – Happ	7 – Hayes	Kohl Center (17,287); Madison, WI
Nov 20*; 4:00 pm, ESPN2		vs. Georgetown; 2K Sports Classic semifinals	L 61–71	2–2	22 – Hayes	10 – Happ	3 – Tied	Madison Square Garden (N/A); New York City, NY
Nov 22*; 2:30 pm, ESPN2		vs. VCU; 2K Sports Classic third place game	W 74–73	3–2	22 – Koenig	10 – Happ	6 – Showalter	Madison Square Garden (17,287); New York City, NY
Nov 25*; 7:00 pm, BTN		Prairie View A&M	W 85–67	4–2	16 – Koenig	8 – Happ	7 – Hayes	Kohl Center (17,287); Madison, WI
Nov 29*; 1:30 pm, ESPN2		at No. 7 Oklahoma	L 48–65	4–3	20 – Hayes	11 – Hayes	4 – Hayes	Lloyd Noble Center (8,988); Norman, OK
Dec 2*; 6:15 pm, ESPN2		at No. 14 Syracuse; ACC–Big Ten Challenge	W 66–58 ^{OT}	5–3	18 – Happ	15 – Happ	6 – Hayes	Carrier Dome (22,360); Syracuse, NY
Dec 5*; 11:30 am, CBS		Temple	W 76–60	6–3	18 – Hayes	12 – Hayes	3 – Tied	Kohl Center (17,287); Madison, WI
Dec 9*; 8:00 pm, BTN		Milwaukee	L 67–68	6–4	32 – Hayes	15 – Happ	4 – Showalter	Kohl Center (17,287); Madison, WI
Dec 12*; 12:30 pm, ESPN2		Marquette; Rivalry	L 55–57	6–5	15 – Brown	10 – Showalter	6 – Hayes	Kohl Center (17,287); Madison, WI
Dec 15*; 8:00 pm, BTN		Texas A&M Corpus Christi	W 64–49	7–5	15 – Tied	16 – Brown	6 – Hayes	Kohl Center (17,287); Madison, WI
Dec 23*; 8:00 pm, BTN		Green Bay	W 84–79	8–5	24 – Hayes	9 – Brown	4 – Tied	Kohl Center (17,287); Madison, WI
Big Ten regular season
Dec 29; 6:00 pm, BTN		No. 14 Purdue	L 55–61	8–6 (0–1)	17 – Hayes	7 – Hayes	3 – Koenig	Kohl Center (17,287); Madison, WI
Jan 2; 1:00 pm, BTN		Rutgers	W 79–57	9–6 (1–1)	21 – Showalter	10 – Happ	4 – Koenig	Kohl Center (17,287); Madison, WI
Jan 5; 6:00 pm, ESPN		at Indiana	L 58–59	9–7 (1–2)	15 – Tied	8 – Happ	2 – Koenig	Assembly Hall (14,098); Bloomington, IN
Jan 9; 12:00 pm, ESPN		No. 3 Maryland	L 60–63	9–8 (1–3)	17 – Hayes	11 – Happ	3 – Koenig	Kohl Center (17,287); Madison, WI
Jan 12; 6:00 pm, BTN		at Northwestern	L 65–70	9–9 (1–4)	17 – Hayes	6 – Hayes	7 – Showalter	Welsh-Ryan Arena (7,264); Evanston, IL
Jan 17; 12:30 pm, CBS		No. 4 Michigan State	W 77–76	10–9 (2–4)	27 – Koenig	8 – Happ	4 – Koenig	Kohl Center (17,287); Madison, WI
Jan 21; 7:00 pm, BTN		at Penn State	W 66–60	11–9 (3–4)	20 – Happ	11 – Happ	5 – Hayes	Bryce Jordan Center (7,145); University Park, PA
Jan 26; 6:00 pm, ESPN		No. 19 Indiana	W 82–79 ^{OT}	12–9 (4–4)	31 – Hayes	8 – Happ	2 – Hayes	Kohl Center (17,287); Madison, WI
Jan 31; 6:30 pm, BTN		at Illinois	W 63–55	13–9 (5–4)	17 – Hayes	9 – Happ	2 – Tied	State Farm Center (13,609); Champaign, IL
Feb 4; 6:00 pm, ESPN		Ohio State	W 79–68	14–9 (6–4)	21 – Hayes	7 – Hayes	4 – Showalter	Kohl Center (17,287); Madison, WI
Feb 10; 6:00 pm, BTN		Nebraska	W 72–61	15–9 (7–4)	20 – Hayes	5 – Tied	3 – Tied	Kohl Center (17,287); Madison, WI
Feb 13; 5:30 pm, ESPN		at No. 2 Maryland	W 70–57	16–9 (8–4)	21 – Brown	10 – Happ	5 – Koenig	Xfinity Center (17,950); College Park, MD
Feb 18; 8:00 pm, ESPN		at No. 8 Michigan State	L 57–69	16–10 (8–5)	18 – Happ	8 – Brown	2 – Tied	Breslin Center (14,797); East Lansing, MI
Feb 21; 6:30 pm, BTN		Illinois	W 69–60	17–10 (9–5)	20 – Happ	12 – Happ	5 – Showalter	Kohl Center (17,287); Madison, WI
Feb 24; 8:00 pm, BTN		at No. 8 Iowa	W 67–59	18–10 (10–5)	15 – Koenig	6 – Tied	4 – Tied	Carver–Hawkeye Arena (15,400); Iowa City, IA
Feb 28; 5:00 pm, BTN		Michigan	W 68–57	19–10 (11–5)	19 – Koenig	7 – Hayes	4 – Hayes	Kohl Center (17,287); Madison, WI
Mar 2; 8:00 pm, BTN		at Minnesota	W 62–49	20–10 (12–5)	14 – Koenig	10 – Happ	6 – Koenig	Williams Arena (12,275); Minneapolis, MN
Mar 6; 6:30 pm, BTN		at No. 15 Purdue	L 80–91	20–11 (12–6)	30 – Hayes	8 – Hayes	4 – Koenig	Mackey Arena (14,846); West Lafayette, IN
Big Ten tournament
Mar 10; 8:00 pm, ESPN2	(6)	vs. (11) Nebraska; Second Round	L 58–70	20–12	17 – Happ	8 – Brown	4 – Koenig	Bankers Life Fieldhouse (15,571); Indianapolis, IN
NCAA tournament
Mar 18*; 5:50 pm, TNT	(7 E)	vs. (10 E) Pittsburgh; First Round	W 47–43	21–12	15 – Happ	9 – Happ	3 – Happ	Scottrade Center (14,425); St. Louis, MO
Mar 20*; 7:40 pm, TNT	(7 E)	vs. (2 E) No. 9 Xavier; Second Round	W 66–63	22–12	20 – Koenig	8 – Hayes	3 – Tied	Scottrade Center (15,169); St. Louis, MO
Mar 25*; 6:27 pm, TBS	(7 E)	vs. (6 E) Notre Dame; Sweet Sixteen	L 56–61	22–13	14 – Happ	12 – Happ	3 – Tied	Wells Fargo Center (20,686); Philadelphia, PA
*Non-conference game. ^{#}Rankings from AP Poll. (#) Tournament seedings in parentheses. E=East Region. All times are in Central Time.

== Rankings ==
Ranking movements Legend: ██ Increase in ranking ██ Decrease in ranking — = Not ranked RV = Received votes
	Week																			
Poll	Pre	2	3	4	5	6	7	8	9	10	11	12	13	14	15	16	17	18	19	Final
AP	17	RV	—	—	—	—	—	—	—	—	—	—	—	—	RV	RV	RV	RV	RV	N/A
Coaches	17	RV	—	—	—	—	—	—	—	—	—	—	—	—	RV	RV	RV	25	RV	23

== Player statistics ==
Individual player statistics
			Minutes		Scoring		Total FGs			3-point FGs			Free-Throws			Rebounds							
Player	GP	GS	Tot	Avg	Pts	Avg	FG	FGA	Pct	3FG	3FA	Pct	FT	FTA	Pct	Off	Def	Tot	Avg	A	TO	Blk	Stl
Bax, Jackson	3	0	2	0.7	0	0.0	0	0	.000	0	0	.000	0	0	.000	0	0	0	0.0	0	0	0	0
Brown, Vitto	35	35	888	25.4	340	9.7	130	292	.445	38	95	.400	42	55	.764	60	114	174	5.0	29	40	19	19
Dearring, Riley	3	0	6	2.0	2	0.7	0	2	.000	0	2	.000	2	2	1.000	0	2	2	0.7	0	2	0	0
Decorah, Will	4	0	3	0.8	0	0.0	0	1	.000	0	0	.000	0	0	.000	1	0	1	0.3	0	1	0	0
Happ, Ethan	35	35	982	28.1	434	12.4	163	303	.538	0	0	.000	108	168	.643	88	190	278	7.9	44	76	32	63
Hayes, Nigel	35	35	1267	36.2	551	15.7	161	438	.368	39	133	.293	190	258	.736	69	135	205	5.8	104	79	14	39
Hill, Jordan	30	1	467	15.6	87	2.9	33	87	.379	17	51	.333	4	6	.667	14	28	42	1.4	24	19	1	9
Illikainen, Alex	33	0	324	9.8	71	2.2	26	63	.413	9	28	.321	10	15	.667	16	33	49	1.5	13	11	3	6
Iverson, Khalil	34	0	443	13.0	87	2.6	33	70	.471	2	12	.167	19	36	.528	24	39	63	1.9	21	31	20	12
Koenig, Bronson	35	35	1222	34.9	459	13.1	151	385	.392	83	213	.390	74	97	.763	13	84	97	2.8	84	52	6	14
Moesch, Aaron	16	0	48	3.0	4	0.3	1	2	.500	0	0	.000	2	2	1.000	2	3	5	0.3	1	1	0	2
Pritzl, Brevin	1	0	4	4.0	0	0.0	0	0	.000	0	0	.000	0	0	.000	0	0	0	0.0	0	1	0	0
Schlundt, T.J.	5	0	4	0.8	0	0.0	0	0	.000	0	0	.000	0	0	.000	0	0	0	0.0	1	0	0	0
Showalter, Zak	35	35	1099	31.4	262	7.5	90	198	.455	37	107	.346	45	56	.804	26	108	134	3.8	76	48	7	36
Smith, Jordan	8	0	9	1.1	4	0.5	1	3	.333	0	0	.000	2	3	.667	1	1	2	0.3	0	1	1	0
Thomas, Charlie	31	0	282	9.1	72	2.3	27	73	.370	4	15	.267	14	30	.467	21	42	63	2.0	3	5	11	5
Team																63	51	114	3.2		19		
Total	35		7050		2373	67.8	816	1917	.426	229	656	.349	512	728	.703	398	830	1228	35.1	400	386	114	205
Opponents	35		7050		2233	63.8	794	1862	.426	201	539	.373	444	626	.709	318	803	1121	32.0	371	419	116	190

Legend
GP	Games played	GS	Games started	Avg	Average per game
FG	Field-goals made	FGA	Field-goal attempts	Off	Offensive rebounds
Def	Defensive rebounds	A	Assists	TO	Turnovers
Blk	Blocks	Stl	Steals	High	Team high

== Season highs ==
		Player	Game	Date
Points	32	Nigel Hayes	vs. Milwaukee	December 9, 2015
Rebounds	16	Vitto Brown	vs. Texas A&M–Corpus Christi	December 15, 2015
Assists	7	Nigel Hayes	vs. North Dakota	November 17, 2015
Assists	7	Nigel Hayes	vs. Prairie View A&M	November 25, 2015
Assists	7	Zak Showalter	at Northwestern	January 12, 2016
Steals	6	Ethan Happ	vs. Illinois	February 21, 2016
Blocks	3	Khalil Iverson	vs. Western Illinois	November 13, 2015
Blocks	3	Ethan Happ	at Syracuse	December 2, 2015
Blocks	3	Ethan Happ	vs. Milwaukee	December 9, 2015
Blocks	3	Ethan Happ	vs. Texas A&M–Corpus Christi	December 15, 2015
Blocks	3	Vitto Brown	vs. Green Bay	December 23, 2015
Blocks	3	Khalil Iverson	vs. Xavier	March 20, 2016

== See also ==
- 2015–16 Wisconsin Badgers women's basketball team
