= 2015–16 Maryland Terrapins men's basketball team =

American college basketball season

2015–16 Maryland Terrapins men's basketball
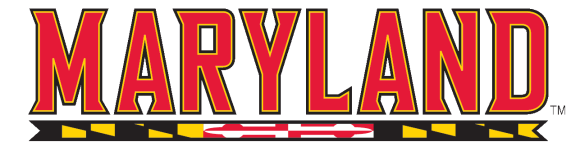

Cancún Challenge (Riviera) champions

NCAA tournament, Sweet Sixteen
- Conference: Big Ten Conference

Ranking
- Coaches: No. 13
- AP: No. 18
- Record: 27–9 (12–6 Big Ten)
- Head coach: Mark Turgeon (5th season)
- Assistant coaches: Dustin Clark; Bino Ranson; Cliff Warren
- Home arena: Xfinity Center

2015–16 Big Ten Conference men's basketball standings
	Conf.				Overall
Team	W		L	PCT	W		L	PCT
No. 14 Indiana	15	–	3	.833	27	–	8	.771
No. 2 Michigan State †	13	–	5	.722	29	–	6	.829
No. 18 Maryland	12	–	6	.667	27	–	9	.750
No. 12 Purdue	12	–	6	.667	26	–	9	.743
No. 25 Iowa	12	–	6	.667	22	–	11	.667
Wisconsin	12	–	6	.667	22	–	13	.629
Ohio State	11	–	7	.611	21	–	14	.600
Michigan	10	–	8	.556	23	–	13	.639
Northwestern	8	–	10	.444	20	–	12	.625
Penn State	7	–	11	.389	16	–	16	.500
Nebraska	6	–	12	.333	16	–	18	.471
Illinois	5	–	13	.278	15	–	19	.441
Minnesota	2	–	16	.111	11	–	20	.355
Rutgers	1	–	17	.056	7	–	25	.219
† 2016 Big Ten tournament winner Rankings from AP poll

The 2015–16 Maryland Terrapins men's basketball team represented the University of Maryland, College Park in the 2015–16 NCAA Division I men's basketball season. They were led by fifth year head coach Mark Turgeon and played their home games at Xfinity Center. This was their second year as members of the Big Ten Conference. They finished the season with a record of 27–9, 12–6 in Big Ten play to finish in a four-way tie for third place in conference. They defeated Nebraska in the quarterfinals of the Big Ten tournament to advance to the semifinals where they lost to Michigan State. They received an at-large bid to the NCAA tournament where they defeated South Dakota State and Hawaii to advance to the Sweet Sixteen. In the Sweet Sixteen, they lost to Kansas.

== Previous season ==
The Terrapins finished the 2014–15 season with a record of 28–7, 14–4 in Big Ten play to finish in second place in conference. They advanced to the semifinals of the Big Ten tournament where they lost to Michigan State. They received an at-large bid to the NCAA tournament where they defeated Valparaiso in the First Round before losing in the Second Round to West Virginia.

=== Departures ===
Name	Number	Pos.	Height	Weight	Year	Hometown	Notes
Evan Smotrycz	1	F	6'9"	235	RS Senior	Reading, MA	Graduated
Spencer Barks	14	F	6'9"	225	Senior	Poolesville, MD	Graduated
Richaud Pack	20	G	6'3"	185	Senior	Detroit, MI	Graduated
Jacob Susskind	24	G	6'5"	205	Senior	West Orange, NJ	Graduated
Jonathan Graham	25	F	6'7"	220	Senior	Baltimore, MD	Graduated
Dez Wells	44	G/F	6'4"	215	Senior	Raleigh, NC	Graduated/Went undrafted in 2015 NBA draft

=== Incoming transfers ===
Name	Number	Pos.	Height	Weight	Year	Hometown	Previous School
Rasheed Sulaimon	4	G	6'4"	185	Senior	Houston, TX	Graduated from Duke after controversy that resulted in him being removed from the Duke men's basketball team. Under NCAA graduate transfer rules, Sulaimon was eligible to play immediately.

== Pre-season ==
=== 2015 recruiting class ===
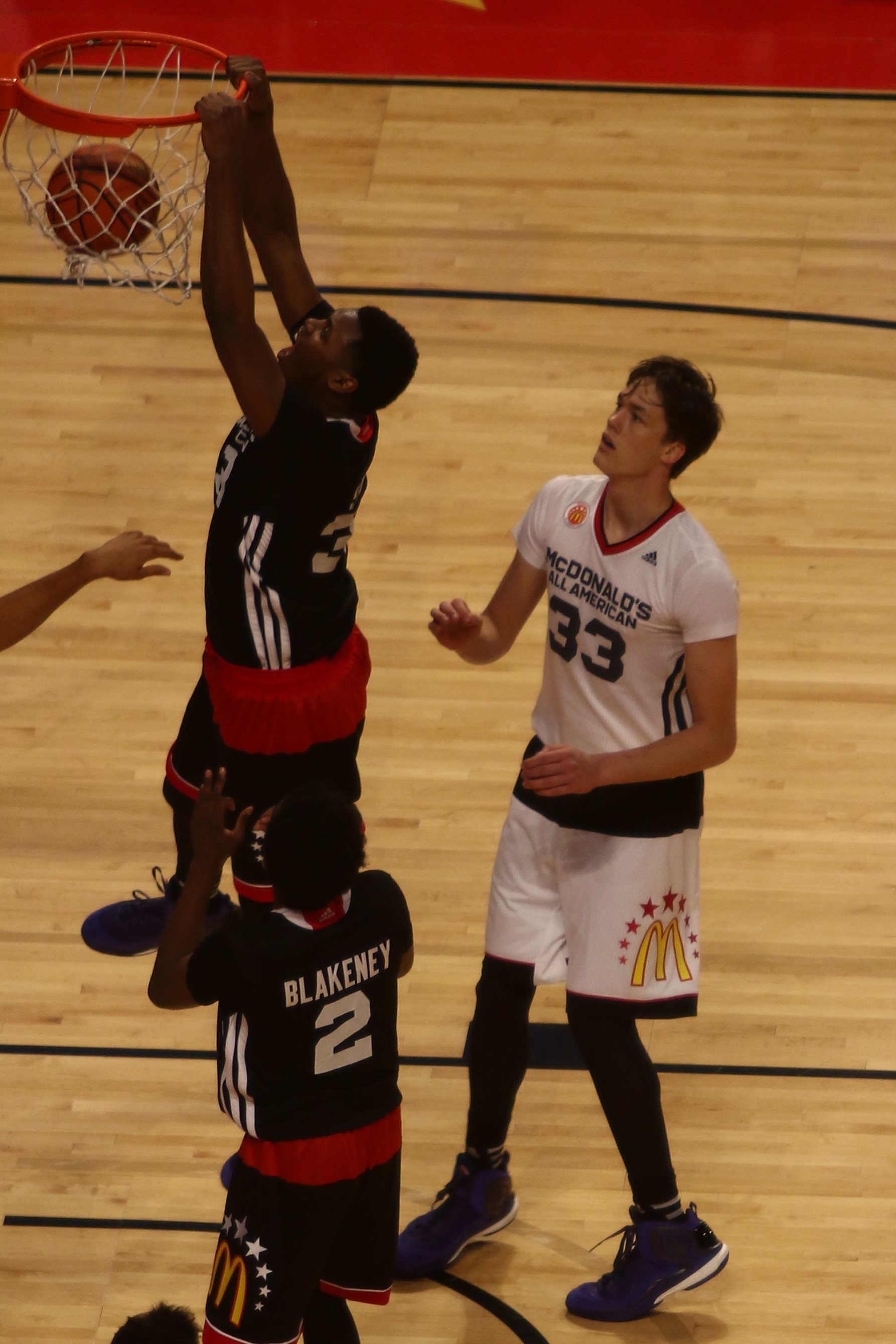
Diamond Stone in the 2015 McDonald's All-American Boys Game

College recruiting
Name	Hometown	School	Height	Weight	Commit date
Diamond Stone; C	Milwaukee, Wisconsin	Dominican High School	6 ft 10 in (2.08 m)	250 lb (110 kg)	Mar 27, 2015
Diamond Stone; C	Recruit ratings: Scout: Rivals: 247Sports: ESPN:				
Jaylen Brantley; PG	Springfield, Massachusetts	Notre Dame Prep	5 ft 11 in (1.80 m)	160 lb (73 kg)	Oct 20, 2014
Jaylen Brantley; PG	Recruit ratings: Scout: Rivals: 247Sports: ESPN:				
Overall recruit ranking:
Note: In many cases, Scout, Rivals, 247Sports, On3, and ESPN may conflict in their listings of height and weight.; In these cases, the average was taken. ESPN grades are on a 100-point scale.; Sources: "Maryland 2015 Basketball Commitments". Rivals.; "2015 Maryland Commits". Scout.; "ESPN". ESPN.; "Scout.com Team Recruiting Rankings". Scout.; "2015 Team Ranking". Rivals.

== Roster ==
2015–16 Maryland Terrapins men's basketball team
Players
Coaches

Pos.	#	Name	Height	Weight	Year	Hometown
G	0	Rasheed Sulaimon	6 ft 5 in (1.96 m)	195 lb (88 kg)	Sr	Houston, Texas
PG	1	Jaylen Brantley	5 ft 11 in (1.8 m)	170 lb (77 kg)	So	Springfield, Massachusetts
G	2	Melo Trimble	6 ft 2 in (1.88 m)	175 lb (79 kg)	So	Upper Marlboro, Maryland
PF	4	Robert Carter	6 ft 8 in (2.03 m)	250 lb (113 kg)	RS Jr	Thomasville, Georgia
G	5	Dion Wiley (injured)	6 ft 4 in (1.93 m)	195 lb (88 kg)	So	Oxon Hill, Maryland
F	10	Jake Layman	6 ft 9 in (2.06 m)	190 lb (86 kg)	Sr	Wrentham, Massachusetts
G/F	11	Jared Nickens	6 ft 6 in (1.98 m)	190 lb (86 kg)	So	Monmouth Junction, New Jersey
G	12	Trevor Anzmann (W)	5 ft 11 in (1.8 m)	175 lb (79 kg)	Sr	Westminster, Maryland
F	13	Ivan Bender	6 ft 9 in (2.06 m)	190 lb (86 kg)	RS Fr	Split, Croatia
C	15	Michal Čekovský	7 ft 0 in (2.13 m)	225 lb (102 kg)	So	Košice, Slovakia
G	21	Varun Ram (W)	5 ft 9 in (1.75 m)	150 lb (68 kg)	RS Sr	Clarksville, Maryland
G	23	Kent Auslander (W)	6 ft 6 in (1.98 m)	200 lb (91 kg)	Fr	Herndon, Virginia
G	24	Andrew Terrell (W)	6 ft 0 in (1.83 m)	190 lb (86 kg)	Fr	Indianapolis, Indiana
C	33	Diamond Stone	6 ft 11 in (2.11 m)	250 lb (113 kg)	Fr	Milwaukee, Wisconsin
C	35	Damonte Dodd	6 ft 11 in (2.11 m)	240 lb (109 kg)	Jr	Centreville, Maryland

Head coach

- Mark Turgeon (Kansas)

Assistant coach(es)

- Dustin Clark (Texas A&M)
- Bino Ranson (SNHU)
- Cliff Warren (Mount St. Mary's)

Legend

- (C) Team captain
- (S) Suspended
- (I) Ineligible
- (W) Walk-on
- Injured
- Current redshirt

Roster

=== Depth chart ===
Pos.	Starting 5	Bench 1	Bench 2	Bench 3
C	Diamond Stone	Damonte Dodd
PF	Robert Carter	Michal Čekovský	Ivan Bender
SF	Jake Layman	Jared Nickens
SG	Rasheed Sulaimon	Dion Wiley	Trevor Anzmann	Kent Auslander
PG	Melo Trimble	Jaylen Brantley	Varun Ram	Andrew Terrell

== Schedule and results ==
Date time, TV	Rank^{#}	Opponent^{#}	Result	Record	High points	High rebounds	High assists	Site (attendance) city, state
Exhibition
Nov. 6*; 7:00 pm, BTN+	No. 3	Southern New Hampshire	W 91–55	–	16 – Stone	10 – Carter	3 – Tied	Xfinity Center (–); College Park, MD
Regular season
Nov. 13*; 7:00 pm, BTN	No. 3	Mount St. Mary's	W 80–56	1–0	16 – Layman	8 – Carter	5 – Sulaimon	Xfinity Center (17,950); College Park, MD
Nov. 17*; 9:00 pm, ESPN2	No. 3	Georgetown; Gavitt Tipoff Games	W 75–71	2–0	24 – Trimble	8 – Carter	7 – Sulaimon	Xfinity Center (17,950); College Park, MD
Nov. 20*; 7:00 pm, BTN	No. 3	Rider	W 65–58	3–0	13 – Carter	11 – Layman	5 – Trimble	Xfinity Center (17,950); College Park, MD
Nov. 24*; 8:30 pm, CBSSN	No. 2	vs. Illinois State; Cancún Challenge Semifinals	W 77–66	4–0	18 – Sulaimon	6 – Layman	7 – Trimble	Hard Rock Hotel (982); Cancún, México
Nov. 25*; 8:30 pm, CBSSN	No. 2	vs. Rhode Island; Cancún Challenge Championship	W 86–63	5–0	17 – Tied	9 – Carter	4 – Tied	Hard Rock Hotel (982); Cancún, México
Nov. 28*; 8:30 pm, BTN	No. 2	Cleveland State	W 80–63	6–0	17 – Carter	8 – Carter	6 – Trimble	Xfinity Center (17,282); College Park, MD
Dec. 1*; 9:30 pm, ESPN	No. 2	at No. 9 North Carolina; ACC–Big Ten Challenge	L 81–89	6–1	23 – Trimble	8 – Layman	12 – Trimble	Dean Smith Center (21,163); Chapel Hill, NC
Dec. 4*; 7:00 pm, BTN	No. 2	Saint Francis (PA)	W 96–55	7–1	20 – Carter	6 – Tied	7 – Trimble	Xfinity Center (17,950); College Park, MD
Dec. 8*; 9:30 pm, ESPN	No. 6	vs. UConn; Jimmy V Classic	W 76–66	8–1	25 – Trimble	11 – Carter	3 – Trimble	Madison Square Garden (19,812); New York City, NY
Dec. 12*; 4:15 pm, BTN	No. 6	Maryland Eastern Shore	W 77–56	9–1	18 – Trimble	6 – Stone	10 – Sulaimon	Xfinity Center (17,950); College Park, MD
Dec. 19*; 7:00 pm, BTN	No. 6	vs. Princeton; Baltimore Showcase	W 82–61	10–1	19 – Layman	8 – Layman	10 – Trimble	Royal Farms Arena (11,076); Baltimore, MD
Dec. 27*; 4:00 pm, BTN	No. 4	Marshall	W 87–67	11–1	19 – Carter	8 – Carter	7 – Trimble	Xfinity Center (17,950); College Park, MD
Big Ten Regular Season
Dec. 30; 5:00 pm, ESPN2	No. 4	Penn State	W 70–64	12–1 (1–0)	39 – Stone	12 – Stone	6 – Trimble	Xfinity Center (17,950); College Park, MD
Jan. 2; 8:00 pm, BTN	No. 4	at Northwestern	W 72–59	13–1 (2–0)	24 – Trimble	8 – Tied	8 – Trimble	Welsh-Ryan Arena (8,117); Evanston, IL
Jan. 6; 7:00 pm, BTN	No. 3	Rutgers	W 88–63	14–1 (3–0)	18 – Layman	10 – Tied	2 – Tied	Xfinity Center (17,950); College Park, MD
Jan. 9; 1:00 pm, ESPN	No. 3	at Wisconsin	W 63–60	15–1 (4–0)	21 – Trimble	11 – Carter	5 – Trimble	Kohl Center (17,287); Madison, WI
Jan. 12; 9:00 pm, ESPN	No. 3	at Michigan	L 67–70	15–2 (4–1)	22 – Stone	11 – Stone	3 – Trimble	Crisler Center (12,327); Ann Arbor, MI
Jan. 16; 12:00 pm, ESPN2	No. 3	Ohio State	W 100–65	16–2 (5–1)	25 – Carter	6 – Stone	9 – Trimble	Xfinity Center (17,950); College Park, MD
Jan. 19; 8:00 pm, BTN	No. 7	Northwestern	W 62–56 ^{OT}	17–2 (6–1)	18 – Trimble	14 – Carter	6 – Trimble	Xfinity Center (17,950); College Park, MD
Jan. 23; 6:30 pm, ESPN	No. 7	at No. 11 Michigan State; ESPN College GameDay	L 65–74	17–3 (6–2)	24 – Trimble	7 – Tied	3 – Tied	Breslin Center (14,797); East Lansing, MI
Jan. 28; 7:00 pm, ESPN	No. 8	No. 3 Iowa	W 74–68	18–3 (7–2)	17 – Tied	7 – Carter	5 – Sulaimon	Xfinity Center (17,950); College Park, MD
Jan. 31; 1:00 pm, CBS	No. 8	at Ohio State	W 66–61	19–3 (8–2)	20 – Trimble	10 – Layman	5 – Sulaimon	Value City Arena (16,592); Columbus, OH
Feb. 3; 8:30 pm, BTN	No. 4	at Nebraska	W 70–65	20–3 (9–2)	20 – Trimble	10 – Stone	5 – Carter	Pinnacle Bank Arena (15,693); Lincoln, NE
Feb. 6; 4:00 pm, ESPN	No. 4	No. 18 Purdue	W 72–61	21–3 (10–2)	21 – Sulaimon	10 – Sulaimon	7 – Trimble	Xfinity Center (17,950); College Park, MD
Feb. 9*; 6:00 pm, BTN	No. 2	Bowie State	W 93–62	22–3	16 – Sulaimon	7 – Carter	3 – Trimble	Xfinity Center (17,950); College Park, MD
Feb. 13; 6:30 pm, ESPN	No. 2	Wisconsin	L 57–70	22–4 (10–3)	17 – Sulaimon	8 – Carter	6 – Trimble	Xfinity Center (17,950); College Park, MD
Feb. 18; 8:00 pm, BTN	No. 6	at Minnesota	L 63–68	22–5 (10–4)	28 – Sulaimon	9 – Tied	6 – Trimble	Williams Arena (10,768); Minneapolis, MN
Feb. 21; 1:00 pm, CBS	No. 6	Michigan	W 86–82	23–5 (11–4)	17 – Carter	8 – Trimble	4 – Sulaimon	Xfinity Center (17,950); College Park, MD
Feb. 27; 4:00 pm, ESPN	No. 10	at No. 20 Purdue	L 79–83	23–6 (11–5)	19 – Trimble	5 – Tied	5 – Trimble	Mackey Arena (14,846); West Lafayette, IN
Mar. 3; 7:00 pm, ESPN	No. 14	Illinois	W 81–55	24–6 (12–5)	18 – Tied	8 – Trimble	9 – Sulaimon	Xfinity Center (17,950); College Park, MD
Mar. 6; 4:30 pm, CBS	No. 14	at No. 12 Indiana	L 62–80	24–7 (12–6)	17 – Trimble	7 – Stone	3 – Tied	Assembly Hall (17,472); Bloomington, IN
Big Ten tournament
Mar. 11; 9:00 pm, BTN	(3) No. 18	vs. (11) Nebraska; Quarterfinals	W 97–86	25–7	26 – Layman	8 – Stone	8 – Trimble	Bankers Life Fieldhouse (15,942); Indianapolis, IN
Mar. 12; 3:30 pm, CBS	(3) No. 18	vs. (2) No. 2 Michigan State; Semifinals	L 61–64	25–8	18 – Carter	8 – Carter	3 – Sulaimon	Bankers Life Fieldhouse (18,339); Indianapolis, IN
NCAA tournament
Mar. 18*; 4:30 pm, TBS	(5 S) No. 18	vs. (12 S) South Dakota State; First Round	W 79–74	26–8	27 – Layman	11 – Carter	3 – Sulaimon	Spokane Veterans Memorial Arena (11,109); Spokane, WA
Mar. 20*; 7:10 pm, TBS	(5 S) No. 18	vs. (13 S) Hawaii; Second Round	W 73–60	27–8	24 – Trimble	9 – Carter	3 – Tied	Spokane Veterans Memorial Arena (11,296); Spokane, WA
Mar. 24*; 9:40 pm, CBS	(5 S) No. 18	vs. (1 S) No. 1 Kansas; Sweet Sixteen	L 63–79	27–9	18 – Sulaimon	6 – Carter	3 – Layman	KFC Yum! Center (19,399); Louisville, KY
*Non-conference game. ^{#}Rankings from AP Poll. (#) Tournament seedings in parentheses. S=South Region. All times are in Eastern Time.

== Rankings ==
Ranking movement Legend: ██ Increase in ranking. ██ Decrease in ranking. (RV) Received votes but unranked. (NR) Not ranked.
Poll	Pre	Wk 2	Wk 3	Wk 4	Wk 5	Wk 6	Wk 7	Wk 8	Wk 9	Wk 10	Wk 11	Wk 12	Wk 13	Wk 14	Wk 15	Wk 16	Wk 17	Wk 18	Wk 19	Final
AP	3	3	2	2	6	6	4	4	3	3	7	8	4	2	6	10	14	18	18	n/a
Coaches	3	3	2	2	9	7	4	4	3	3	5	7	3	2	5	9	12	15	17	13

== See also ==
- 2015–16 Maryland Terrapins women's basketball team
