= Khalil Iverson =

American professional basketball player

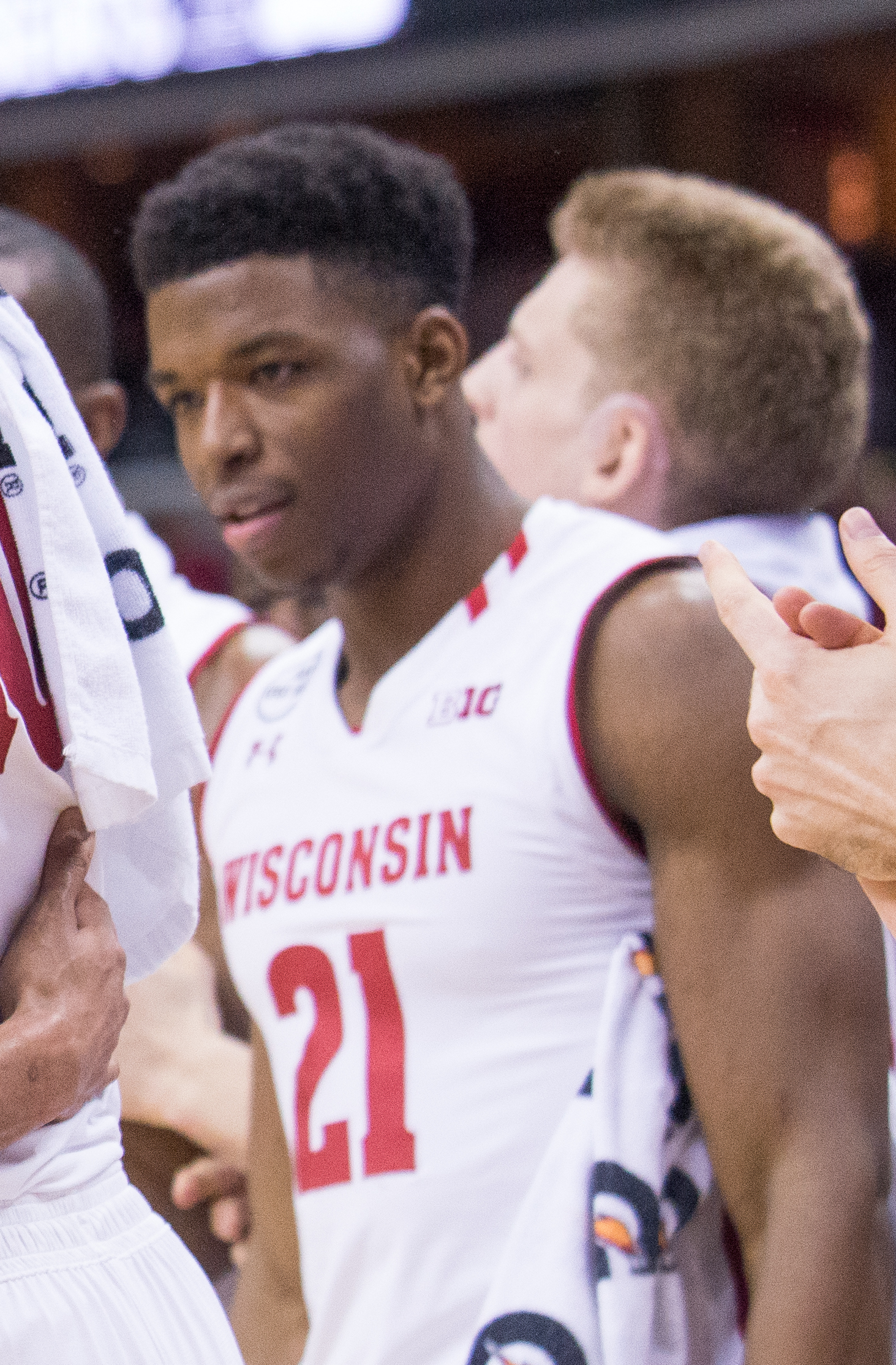
- Iverson in 2017

Personal information
- Born: July 19, 1997 (age 29) Columbus, Ohio, U.S.
- Listed height: 6 ft 5 in (1.96 m)
- Listed weight: 210 lb (95 kg)

Career information
- High school: Rutherford B. Hayes (Delaware, Ohio)
- College: Wisconsin (2015–2019)
- NBA draft: 2019: undrafted
- Playing career: 2019–present
- Position: Small forward / Power forward

Career history
- 2019–2020: Grand Rapids Drive
- 2021: Grand Rapids Gold
- 2021–2022: Lahti Basketball
- 2023: Rayos de Hermosillo
- 2023: Astros de Jalisco
- 2024: Rayos de Hermosillo
- 2024: Freseros de Irapuato
- 2025–2026: Rayos de Hermosillo

Career highlights
- CIBACOPA champion (2024)

Khalil Iverson (born July 19, 1997) is an American professional basketball who plays for Rayos de Hermosillo of the CIBACOPA. He played college basketball for Wisconsin.

== Early life ==
Khalil is the son of Kevin and Tracey Iverson and grew up in Delaware, Ohio. Kevin died of a heart attack in 2015, shortly before Khalil's senior season. Khalil attended Rutherford B. Hayes High School in Delaware, where he earned honorable mention all-Ohio honors as a junior and second-team all-Ohio honors as a senior. Kevin Jr., Khalil's older brother, recorded highlights from Khalil's games and sent them to major college basketball programs. Khalil is the school's all-time leading rebounder.

== College career ==
On April 15, 2015, Iverson signed a letter of intent to play for Wisconsin, turning down offers from Tennessee, Bowling Green, North Florida, Penn State, UNC Asheville, and Winthrop. He was ranked as the twelfth-best player in Ohio by 247Sports.com.

In his first season at Wisconsin, Iverson played in 34 of the team's 35 games, including a season-high 30 minutes against Illinois. He saw a slight minutes increase his sophomore year and averaged 3.9 points per game. He earned a starting position his junior year, being only one of two players to start all 33 games for the Badgers. He finished the season with 8.1 points and 5.6 rebounds per game. He retained his starting job for his senior year, missing just one game with a leg injury. He had a career-high 22 points and 14 rebounds in a victory over Ohio State. He finished his college career with 135 games played, including 66 starts.

Iverson was known for flashy dunks throughout his college career, including a reverse alley-oop in the 2018 Big Ten men's basketball tournament against Michigan State. His performances earned him an invitation to the 2019 Great Clips Slam Dunk Championship, where he was eliminated in the first round.

== Professional career ==
In October 2019, Iverson was announced as a member of the training camp roster for the Grand Rapids Drive of the NBA G League. Iverson appeared in 40 of 43 games as a backup for the Drive, averaging 6.2 points, 3.8 rebounds and 1.5 assists per game until the season was cancelled due to the COVID-19 pandemic.

In October 2021, Iverson joined the Grand Rapids Gold. He signed with Lahti Basketball of the Korisliiga on November 9.

== The Basketball tournament ==
In 2019, Iverson competed in The Basketball Tournament (TBT) with Kohl Blooded, a team composed of Wisconsin alumni. The team was upset in the first round of the Columbus regionals by Mid-American Conference alumni Mid-American Unity despite Iverson's 17 points. Iverson competed in the 2019 TBT Dunk Contest, where he won $10,000 by finishing second to Will Coleman. Iverson's first dunk over Zach Jones received over 250 thousand views on Bleacher Report's Twitter account.

In 2020, Iverson joined Big X, a team composed primarily of former Big Ten players, in the 2020 tournament. The team defeated D2, 79–74, in the first round; Iverson led the game with 11 rebounds.

== Career statistics ==
Legend
GP	Games played	GS	Games started	MPG	Minutes per game
FG%	Field goal percentage	3P%	3-point field goal percentage	FT%	Free throw percentage
RPG	Rebounds per game	APG	Assists per game	SPG	Steals per game
BPG	Blocks per game	PPG	Points per game	**Bold**	Career high

Year	Team	GP	GS	MPG	FG%	3P%	FT%	RPG	APG	SPG	BPG	PPG
2019–20	Grand Rapids	40	4	17.1	.568	.381	.487	3.8	1.5	.7	.8	6.2
Career		40	4	17.1	.568	.381	.487	3.8	1.5	.7	.8	6.2
