= 2015–16 Penn State Nittany Lions basketball team =

American college basketball season

2015–16 Penn State Nittany Lions basketball
- Conference: Big Ten Conference
- Record: 16–16 (7–11 Big Ten)
- Head coach: Pat Chambers (5th season)
- Assistant coaches: Keith Urgo; Dwayne Anderson; Ross Condon
- Home arena: Bryce Jordan Center; Rec Hall

2015–16 Big Ten Conference men's basketball standings
	Conf.				Overall
Team	W		L	PCT	W		L	PCT
No. 14 Indiana	15	–	3	.833	27	–	8	.771
No. 2 Michigan State †	13	–	5	.722	29	–	6	.829
No. 18 Maryland	12	–	6	.667	27	–	9	.750
No. 12 Purdue	12	–	6	.667	26	–	9	.743
No. 25 Iowa	12	–	6	.667	22	–	11	.667
Wisconsin	12	–	6	.667	22	–	13	.629
Ohio State	11	–	7	.611	21	–	14	.600
Michigan	10	–	8	.556	23	–	13	.639
Northwestern	8	–	10	.444	20	–	12	.625
Penn State	7	–	11	.389	16	–	16	.500
Nebraska	6	–	12	.333	16	–	18	.471
Illinois	5	–	13	.278	15	–	19	.441
Minnesota	2	–	16	.111	11	–	20	.355
Rutgers	1	–	17	.056	7	–	25	.219
† 2016 Big Ten tournament winner Rankings from AP poll

The 2015–16 Penn State Nittany Lions basketball team represented Pennsylvania State University in the 2015–16 NCAA Division I men's basketball season. Head coach Pat Chambers coached his fifth season with the team. They played its home games in University Park, Pennsylvania at the Bryce Jordan Center, with two games at Rec Hall, and were members of the Big Ten Conference. They finished the season 16–16, 7–11 in Big Ten play to finish in tenth place. They lost to Ohio State in the second round of the Big Ten tournament.

== Previous season ==
The Nittany Lions finished the 2014–15 season with an overall record of 18–16, with a record of 4–14 in the Big Ten regular season to finish in 13th place. They advanced to the quarterfinals of the Big Ten tournament where they lost to Purdue.

== Departures ==
Name	Number	Pos.	Height	Weight	Year	Hometown	Notes
John Johnson	1	G	6'1"	175	RS Junior	Pittsburgh, PA	Suspended
D. J. Newbill	2	G	6'4"	205	RS Senior	Philadelphia, PA	Graduated
Geno Thorpe	13	G	6'3"	180	Sophomore	Pittsburgh, PA	Transferred to South Florida
Kevin Montminy	14	G	6'3"	185	Senior	Centre Hall, PA	Graduated
Alan Wisniewski	34	F	6'9"	230	Senior	Sterling Heights, MI	Graduated
Ross Travis	43	F	6'6"	225	Senior	Chaska, MN	Graduated

=== Incoming transfers ===
Name	Number	Pos.	Height	Weight	Year	Hometown	Previous School
Terrence Samuel	13	G	6'4"	202	Sophomore	Brooklyn, NY	Connecticut

- Under NCAA transfer rules, Samuel will have to sit out for the 2015–16 season. Samuel will have three years of remaining eligibility entering the 2016–17 season.

== Incoming recruits ==
College recruiting information
Name	Hometown	School	Height	Weight	Commit date
Josh Reaves; SG	Fairfax, VA	Oak Hill Academy	6 ft 4 in (1.93 m)	185 lb (84 kg)	Jul 1, 2014
Josh Reaves; SG	Recruit ratings: Scout: Rivals: 247Sports: ESPN:				
Mike Watkins; C	Philadelphia, PA	The Phelps School	6 ft 8 in (2.03 m)	210 lb (95 kg)	Jun 12, 2013
Mike Watkins; C	Recruit ratings: Scout: Rivals: 247Sports: ESPN:				
Deividas Zemgulis; PF	Kaunas, Lithuania	Saint Mary's Ryken	6 ft 6 in (1.98 m)	210 lb (95 kg)	May 12, 2013
Deividas Zemgulis; PF	Recruit ratings: Scout: Rivals: 247Sports: ESPN:				
Overall recruit ranking:
Note: In many cases, Scout, Rivals, 247Sports, On3, and ESPN may conflict in their listings of height and weight.; In these cases, the average was taken. ESPN grades are on a 100-point scale.; Sources: "2015 Team Ranking". Rivals.

=== 2016 Recruiting Class ===
College recruiting information (2016)
Name	Hometown	School	Height	Weight	Commit date
Joe Hampton; SF	Mouth of Wilson, VA	Oak Hill Academy	6 ft 7 in (2.01 m)	265 lb (120 kg)	May 15, 2015
Joe Hampton; SF	Recruit ratings: Scout: Rivals: (79)				
Nazeer Bostick; PF	Philadelphia, PA	Roman Catholic	6 ft 5 in (1.96 m)	170 lb (77 kg)	Apr 30, 2015
Nazeer Bostick; PF	Recruit ratings: Scout: Rivals: (NR)				
Overall recruit ranking:
Note: In many cases, Scout, Rivals, 247Sports, On3, and ESPN may conflict in their listings of height and weight.; In these cases, the average was taken. ESPN grades are on a 100-point scale.; Sources: "2016 Team Ranking". Rivals.

== Personnel ==
=== Roster ===
2015–16 Penn State Nittany Lions men's basketball team
Players
Coaches

Pos.	#	Name	Height	Weight	Year	Previous school	Hometown
F	0	Payton Banks	6 ft 6 in (1.98 m)	220 lb (100 kg)	RS So	Lutheran	Orange, CA
F	1	Deividas Zemgulis	6 ft 6 in (1.98 m)	220 lb (100 kg)	Fr	St. Mary Ryken	Kaunas, Lithuania
G	3	Devin Foster	6 ft 2 in (1.88 m)	205 lb (93 kg)	Sr	Jefferson Township HS/Vincennes	Dayton, OH
F	5	Donovan Jack	6 ft 9 in (2.06 m)	210 lb (95 kg)	Sr	Berks Catholic	Reading, PA
F	10	Brandon Taylor	6 ft 7 in (2.01 m)	225 lb (102 kg)	Sr	Trenton Catholic Academy	Tabernacle, NJ
G	11	Samuel Halle (W)	6 ft 0 in (1.83 m)	185 lb (84 kg)	Jr	West Springfield High School	Springfield, VA
G	13	Terrence Samuel (I) (redshirt)	6 ft 4 in (1.93 m)	202 lb (92 kg)	Jr	Victory Collegiate/Connecticut	Brooklyn, NY
G	21	Isaiah Washington	6 ft 3 in (1.91 m)	160 lb (73 kg)	RS Fr	Williamsport Area	Williamsport, PA
G	23	Josh Reaves	6 ft 4 in (1.93 m)	190 lb (86 kg)	Fr	Oak Hill Academy	Fairfax, VA
F	24	Mike Watkins	6 ft 8 in (2.03 m)	225 lb (102 kg)	Fr	Phelps School	Philadelphia, PA
C	32	Jordan Dickerson	7 ft 1 in (2.16 m)	245 lb (111 kg)	Sr	IMG Academy/Abraham Lincoln HS/SMU	Brooklyn, NY
G	33	Shep Garner	6 ft 2 in (1.88 m)	185 lb (84 kg)	So	Roman Catholic HS	Philadelphia, PA
F	44	Julian Moore	6 ft 10 in (2.08 m)	235 lb (107 kg)	RS So	Germantown Acad	Fort Washington, PA

Head coach

- Pat Chambers (Philadelphia)

Assistant coach(es)

- Keith Urgo (Fairfield)
- Dwayne Anderson (Villanova)
- Ross Condon (Villanova)

Legend

- (C) Team captain
- (S) Suspended
- (I) Ineligible
- (W) Walk-on
- Injured
- Current redshirt

Roster

=== Coaching staff ===
Position	Name	Year	Alma mater
Head coach	Patrick Chambers	2011	Philadelphia University (1994)
Associate head coach	Keith Urgo	2011	Fairfield University (2002)
Assistant coach	Dwayne Anderson	2013	Villanova University (2009)
Assistant coach	Ross Condon	2011	Villanova University (2007)
Director of Basketball Operations	David Caporaletti	2011	Philadelphia University (1993)
On campus recruiting coordinator	Nicholas Colella	2015	Penn State (2013)
Athletic trainer	Jon Salazer	2001	Penn State (1993)
Director of player development	Ryan Devlin	2013	Philadelphia University (2005)
Strength and conditioning coach	Brandon Spayd	2013	Juniata College (2010)
Graduate Manager	Evann Baker	2015	Quinnipiac University (2011)
Graduate Manager	Kevin Hacke	2015	West Virginia University (2013)

== Schedule and results ==
Date time, TV	Rank^{#}	Opponent^{#}	Result	Record	Site (attendance) city, state
Non-conference regular season
Nov 14, 2015*; 1:00 pm		VMI	W 62–50	1–0	Bryce Jordan Center (5,959); University Park, PA
Nov 17, 2015*; 5:00 pm, ESPNU		DePaul; Gavitt Tipoff Games	W 68–62	2–0	Bryce Jordan Center (5,023); University Park, PA
Nov 20, 2015*; 7:00 pm		at Duquesne	L 52–78	2–1	Consol Energy Center (3,520); Pittsburgh, PA
Nov 24, 2015*; 6:00 pm, BTN		Radford	L 74–86	2–2	Bryce Jordan Center (4,675); University Park, PA
Nov 28, 2015*; 1:00 pm		Bucknell	W 62–58	3–2	Bryce Jordan Center (5,097); University Park, PA
Dec 2, 2015*; 7:15 pm, ESPNU		at Boston College; ACC–Big Ten Challenge	W 67–58	4–2	Conte Forum (2,165); Chestnut Hill, MA
Dec 5, 2015*; 12:00 pm, BTN		Eastern Michigan	W 81–70	5–2	Bryce Jordan Center (10,303); University Park, PA
Dec 8, 2015*; 7:00 pm		at George Washington	L 66–76	5–3	Charles E. Smith Center (3,262); Washington, D.C.
Dec 10, 2015*; 7:00 pm		Canisius; Las Vegas Classic	W 81–67	6–3	Rec Hall (4,509); University Park, PA
Dec 12, 2015*; 2:00 pm, BTN		Louisiana–Monroe; Las Vegas Classic	W 54–50	7–3	Rec Hall (4,824); University Park, PA
Dec 19, 2015*; 7:00 pm		vs. Drexel	W 63–57	8–3	Palestra; Philadelphia, PA
Dec 22, 2015*; 10:30 pm		vs. Colorado; Las Vegas Classic semifinals	L 70–71	8–4	Orleans Arena; Paradise, NV
Dec 23, 2015*; 9:00 pm, FS1		vs. Kent State; Las Vegas Classic 3rd place game	W 75–69	9–4	Orleans Arena; Paradise, NV
Big Ten regular season
Dec 30, 2015; 5:00 pm, ESPN2		at No. 4 Maryland	L 64–70	9–5 (0–1)	Xfinity Center (17,950); College Park, MD
Jan 2, 2016; 12:00 pm, BTN		at Michigan	L 56–79	9–6 (0–2)	Crisler Center (12,207); Ann Arbor, MI
Jan 5, 2016; 7:00 pm, BTN		Minnesota	W 86–77	10–6 (1–2)	Bryce Jordan Center (5,892); University Park, PA
Jan 10, 2016; 12:00 pm, BTN		No. 5 Michigan State	L 65–92	10–7 (1–3)	Bryce Jordan Center (10,855); University Park, PA
Jan 13, 2016; 8:30 pm, BTN		at No. 25 Purdue	L 57–74	10–8 (1–4)	Mackey Arena (13,802); West Lafayette, IN
Jan 16, 2016; 8:30 pm, ESPNU		at Northwestern	W 71–62	11–8 (2–4)	Welsh-Ryan Arena (7,512); Evanston, IL
Jan 21, 2016; 8:00 pm, BTN		Wisconsin	L 60–66	11–9 (2–5)	Bryce Jordan Center (7,145); University Park, PA
Jan 25, 2016; 7:00 pm, 11,542		at Ohio State	L 46–66	11–10 (2–6)	Value City Arena (11,542); Columbus, OH
Jan 30, 2016; 12:00 pm, BTN		vs. Michigan; B1G Super Saturday	L 72–79	11–11 (2–7)	Madison Square Garden (12,108); New York City, NY
Feb 3, 2016; 7:00 pm, ESPNU		at No. 5 Iowa	L 49–73	11–12 (2–8)	Carver–Hawkeye Arena (12,596); Iowa City, IA
Feb 6, 2016; 8:00 pm, BTN		No. 22 Indiana	W 68–63	12–12 (3–8)	Bryce Jordan Center (10,351); University Park, PA
Feb 13, 2016; 6:00 pm, ESPNU		at Nebraska	L 54–70	12–13 (3–9)	Pinnacle Bank Arena (15,613); Lincoln, NE
Feb 17, 2016; 6:30 pm, BTN		No. 4 Iowa	W 79–75	13–13 (4–9)	Bryce Jordan Center (6,590); University Park, PA
Feb 20, 2016; 1:00 pm, ESPNU		at Rutgers	W 70–58	14–13 (5–9)	The RAC (5,307); Piscataway, NJ
Feb 25, 2016; 7:00 pm, ESPNU		Nebraska	W 56–55	15–13 (6–9)	Bryce Jordan Center (7,387); University Park, PA
Feb 28, 2016; 12:00 pm, BTN		at No. 6 Michigan State	L 57–88	15–14 (6–10)	Breslin Center (14,797); East Lansing, MI
Mar 3, 2016; 9:00 pm, ESPNU		Northwestern	L 61–71	15–15 (6–11)	Bryce Jordan Center (5,936); University Park, PA
Mar 6, 2016; 12:00 pm, BTN		Illinois	W 86–79 ^{2OT}	16–15 (7–11)	Bryce Jordan Center (9,104); University Park, PA
Big Ten tournament
Mar 10, 2016; 6:30 pm, ESPN2	(10)	vs. (7) Ohio State; Second round	L 75–79	16–16	Bankers Life Fieldhouse (15,751); Indianapolis, IN
*Non-conference game. ^{#}Rankings from AP poll. (#) Tournament seedings in parentheses. All times are in Eastern Time.

Source -

== See also ==
- 2015–16 Penn State Lady Lions basketball team
