= 2015–16 Rutgers Scarlet Knights men's basketball team =

American college basketball season

2015–16 Rutgers Scarlet Knights men's basketball
- Conference: Big Ten Conference
- Record: 7–25 (1–17 Big Ten)
- Head coach: Eddie Jordan (3rd season)
- Assistant coaches: Van Macon; Mike O'Koren; Greg Vetrone
- Home arena: Louis Brown Athletic Center

2015–16 Big Ten Conference men's basketball standings
	Conf.				Overall
Team	W		L	PCT	W		L	PCT
No. 14 Indiana	15	–	3	.833	27	–	8	.771
No. 2 Michigan State †	13	–	5	.722	29	–	6	.829
No. 18 Maryland	12	–	6	.667	27	–	9	.750
No. 12 Purdue	12	–	6	.667	26	–	9	.743
No. 25 Iowa	12	–	6	.667	22	–	11	.667
Wisconsin	12	–	6	.667	22	–	13	.629
Ohio State	11	–	7	.611	21	–	14	.600
Michigan	10	–	8	.556	23	–	13	.639
Northwestern	8	–	10	.444	20	–	12	.625
Penn State	7	–	11	.389	16	–	16	.500
Nebraska	6	–	12	.333	16	–	18	.471
Illinois	5	–	13	.278	15	–	19	.441
Minnesota	2	–	16	.111	11	–	20	.355
Rutgers	1	–	17	.056	7	–	25	.219
† 2016 Big Ten tournament winner Rankings from AP poll

The 2015–16 Rutgers Scarlet Knights men's basketball team represented Rutgers University–New Brunswick during the 2015–16 NCAA Division I men's basketball season. The Scarlet Knights, led by third year head coach Eddie Jordan, played their home games at the Louis Brown Athletic Center as second year members of the Big Ten Conference. They finished the season 7–25, 1–17 in Big Ten play to finishing in last place. They lost in the first round of the Big Ten tournament to Nebraska.

Following the season, head coach Eddie Jordan was fired. He finished at Rutgers with a three-year record of 29–68.

== Previous season ==
The Scarlet Knights finished the 2014-15 Season 10–22, 2–16 in Big Ten play to finish in last place. They lost in the first round of the Big Ten tournament to Minnesota.

== Departures ==
Name	Number	Pos.	Height	Weight	Year	Hometown	Previous School
Malick Kone	0	F	6'5"	200	Senior	Conakry, Guiena	Graduated
Kervin Okoro	3	G/F	6'5"	215	RS Junior	Bronx, NY	Graduate transferred to Norfolk State
Myles Mack	4	G	5'10"	175	Senior	Paterson, NJ	Graduated
Junior Etou	10	F	6'7"	230	Sophomore	Congo	Transferred to Tulsa
Kadeem Jack	11	F/C	6'9"	235	RS Senior	Queens, NY	Graduated
Ryan Johnson	13	G/F	6'6"	190	Freshman	Greensboro, NC	Transferred to Tallahassee Community College
Stephen Zurich	21	F	6'5"	205	Junior	Montvale, NJ	Walk-on; didn't return

=== Incoming transfers ===
Name	Number	Pos.	Height	Weight	Year	Hometown	Previous School
Nigel Johnson	22	G	6'1"	180	Junior	Ashburn, VA	Transferred from Kansas State. Under NCAA transfer rules, Johnson will have to sit out for the 2015–16 season. Will have two years of remaining eligibility.
Omari Grier	31	G	6'4"	180	RS Senior	Erial, NJ	Transferred from Bradley. Will be eligible to play immediately since Grier graduated from Bradley.
Deshawn Freeman	33	F	6'6"	210	Junior	Rocky Mount, NC	Junior college transfer from Hutchinson Community College

== 2015 signing class ==
College recruiting information
Name	Hometown	School	Height	Weight	Commit date
Corey Sanders; PG	Lakeland, FL	Faith Baptist Christian Academy	6 ft 2 in (1.88 m)	170 lb (77 kg)	Sep 4, 2014
Corey Sanders; PG	Recruit ratings: Scout: Rivals: 247Sports: ESPN:				
Jonathan Jean Laurent; PF	Orlando, FL	Dr. Phillips High School	6 ft 6 in (1.98 m)	192 lb (87 kg)	Apr 2, 2015
Jonathan Jean Laurent; PF	Recruit ratings: Scout: Rivals: 247Sports: ESPN:				
Justin Goode; PF	Daleville, VA	Hargrave Military Academy	6 ft 3 in (1.91 m)	185 lb (84 kg)	Nov 10, 2014
Justin Goode; PF	Recruit ratings: Scout: Rivals: 247Sports: ESPN:				
Overall recruit ranking:
Note: In many cases, Scout, Rivals, 247Sports, On3, and ESPN may conflict in their listings of height and weight.; In these cases, the average was taken. ESPN grades are on a 100-point scale.; Sources: "2015 Team Ranking". Rivals.

== Roster ==
2015–16 Rutgers Scarlet Knights men's basketball team
Players
Coaches

Pos.	#	Name	Height	Weight	Year	Previous school	Hometown
F	1	D. J. Foreman	6 ft 8 in (2.03 m)	240 lb (109 kg)	So	Massanutten Military Acad.	Spring Valley, NY
G	2	Bishop Daniels	6 ft 3 in (1.91 m)	185 lb (84 kg)	Sr	Word of God Christian Academy	Raleigh, NC
G	3	Corey Sanders	6 ft 2 in (1.88 m)	175 lb (79 kg)	Fr	Faith Baptist Christian Academy	Lakeland, FL
G	4	Jonathan Laurent	6 ft 6 in (1.98 m)	210 lb (95 kg)	Fr	Dr. Phillips	Lakeland, FL
G	5	Mike Williams	6 ft 2 in (1.88 m)	190 lb (86 kg)	So	Bishop Loughlin	Brooklyn, NY
G	10	Justin Goode	6 ft 2 in (1.88 m)	185 lb (84 kg)	RS Fr	Hargrave Military Acad.	Daleville, VA
G	13	Khalil Batie	5 ft 10 in (1.78 m)	165 lb (75 kg)	Jr	Trenton Catholic Acad.	Willingboro, NJ
G	15	Jake Dadika (W)	5 ft 11 in (1.8 m)	165 lb (75 kg)	So	Spotswood	Milltown, NJ
G	22	Nigel Johnson (I) (redshirt)	6 ft 1 in (1.85 m)	180 lb (82 kg)	Jr	Riverdale Baptist School; Kansas State	Ashburn, VA
G	23	Jalen Hyde (W)	5 ft 8 in (1.73 m)	165 lb (75 kg)	Sr	Franklin	Somerset, NJ
G	31	Omari Grier	6 ft 4 in (1.93 m)	180 lb (82 kg)	RS Sr	Episcopal Acad. Bradley	Erial, NJ
F/C	32	Ibrahima Diallo	6 ft 10 in (2.08 m)	240 lb (109 kg)	RS Fr	Quality Education Academy	Dakar, Senegal
F	33	Deshawn Freeman	6 ft 7 in (2.01 m)	220 lb (100 kg)	Jr	Rocky Mount Academy; Hutchinson CC	Rocky Mount, NC
F/C	35	Greg Lewis	6 ft 9 in (2.06 m)	240 lb (109 kg)	RS Sr	St. Frances Academy	Baltimore, MD
C	40	Shaquille Doorson	6 ft 11 in (2.11 m)	270 lb (122 kg)	So	Canarias Basketball Academy	Netherlands

Head coach

- Eddie Jordan (Rutgers)

Assistant coach(es)

- Van Macon (Southampton)
- Mike O'Koren (North Carolina)
- Greg Vetrone (Long Island)

Legend

- (C) Team captain
- (S) Suspended
- (I) Ineligible
- (W) Walk-on
- Injured
- Current redshirt

Roster

== Schedule ==
Date time, TV	Rank^{#}	Opponent^{#}	Result	Record	Site (attendance) city, state
Non-conference regular season
Nov. 13, 2015*; 7:00 pm		Rutgers–Newark‡	W 72–59	1–0	Louis Brown Athletic Center (3,945); Piscataway, NJ
Nov 15, 2015*; 1:00 pm		Howard; MGM Grand Main Event	W 82–70	2–0	Louis Brown Athletic Center (3,537); Piscataway, NJ
Nov 19, 2015*; 7:00 pm, FS1		at St. John's; Gavitt Tipoff	L 59–61	2–1	Madison Square Garden (4,540); New York City, NY
Nov 21, 2015*; 5:00 pm		Central Arkansas; MGM Grand Main Event	W 87–84	3–1	Louis Brown Athletic Center (4,113); Piscataway, NJ
Nov 23, 2015*; 11:59 pm, YouTube		vs. Creighton; MGM Grand Main Event Heavyweight semifinals	L 75–85	3–2	MGM Grand Garden Arena; Paradise, NV
Nov 25, 2015*; 9:00 pm, ESPN2		vs. Clemson; MGM Grand Main Event Heavyweight 3rd place game	L 58–76	3–3	MGM Grand Garden Arena; Paradise, NV
Nov 30, 2015*; 7:00 pm, ESPN2		Wake Forest; ACC–Big Ten Challenge	L 68–69	3–4	Louis Brown Athletic Center (3,817); Piscataway, NJ
Dec 5, 2015*; Noon, ESPNews		Seton Hall; Rivalry/Garden State Hardwood Classic	L 55–84	3–5	Louis Brown Athletic Center (5,631); Piscataway, NJ
Dec 8, 2015*; 6:00 pm, BTN		Central Connecticut	W 75–59	4–5	Louis Brown Athletic Center (3,131); Piscataway, NJ
Dec 12, 2015*; 4:30 pm, CBSSN		at George Washington	L 49–83	4–6	Charles E. Smith Center (3,172); Washington, D.C.
Dec 20, 2015*; 1:00 pm, BTN		Monmouth	L 67–73	4–7	Louis Brown Athletic Center (6,637); Piscataway, NJ
Dec 23, 2015*; 7:00 pm		Fairleigh Dickinson	W 72–64	5–7	Louis Brown Athletic Center (3,624); Piscataway, NJ
Dec 28, 2015*; 7:00 pm, BTN		UMass Lowell	W 89–66	6–7	Louis Brown Athletic Center (4,075); Piscataway, NJ
Big Ten regular season
Dec 30, 2015; 1:00 pm, ESPN2		Indiana	L 72–79	6–8 (0–1)	Louis Brown Athletic Center (6,002); Piscataway, NJ
Jan 2, 2016; 2:00 pm, BTN		at Wisconsin	L 57–79	6–9 (0–2)	Kohl Center (17,287); Madison, WI
Jan 6, 2016; 7:00 pm, BTN		at No. 3 Maryland	L 63–88	6–10 (0–3)	Xfinity Center (17,950); College Park, MD
Jan 9, 2016; 5:00 pm, ESPNU		Nebraska	L 56–90	6–11 (0–4)	Louis Brown Athletic Center (4,454); Piscataway, NJ
Jan 13, 2016; 6:30 pm, BTN		at Ohio State	L 68–94	6–12 (0–5)	Value City Arena (11,635); Columbus, OH
Jan 18, 2016; 7:00 pm, BTN		No. 22 Purdue	L 57–107	6–13 (0–6)	Louis Brown Athletic Center (5,085); Piscataway, NJ
Jan 21, 2016; 7:00 pm, ESPNU		No. 9 Iowa	L 76–90	6–14 (0–7)	Louis Brown Athletic Center (4,209); Piscataway, NJ
Jan 27, 2016; 7:00 pm, BTN		at Michigan	L 57–68	6–15 (0–8)	Crisler Center (11,519); Ann Arbor, MI
Jan 31, 2016; 5:15 pm, BTN		at No. 12 Michigan State	L 62–96	6–16 (0–9)	Breslin Center (14,797); East Lansing, MI
Feb 3, 2016; 6:30 pm, BTN		Illinois	L 101–110 ^{3OT}	6–17 (0–10)	Louis Brown Athletic Center (4,500); Piscataway, NJ
Feb 6, 2016; 2:00 pm, ESPNU		at Nebraska	L 63–87	6–18 (0–11)	Pinnacle Bank Arena (15,695); Lincoln, NE
Feb 13, 2016; 4:00 pm, BTN		Ohio State	L 69–79	6–19 (0–12)	Louis Brown Athletic Center (5,658); Piscataway, NJ
Feb 16, 2016; 9:00 pm, BTN		at Illinois	L 66–82	6–20 (0–13)	State Farm Center (11,323); Champaign, IL
Feb 20, 2016; 1:00 pm, ESPNU		Penn State	L 58–70	6–21 (0–14)	Louis Brown Athletic Center (5,307); Piscataway, NJ
Feb 23, 2016; 8:30 pm, BTN		at Minnesota	L 61–83	6–22 (0–15)	Williams Arena (10,333); Minneapolis, MN
Feb 27, 2016; 2:00 pm, ESPNU		at Northwestern	L 59–98	6–23 (0–16)	Welsh-Ryan Arena (7,833); Evanston, IL
Mar 2, 2016; 7:00 pm, BTN		No. 2 Michigan State	L 66–97	6–24 (0–17)	Louis Brown Athletic Center (5,561); Piscataway, NJ
Mar 5, 2016; 1:00 pm, BTN		Minnesota	W 75–52	7–24 (1–17)	Louis Brown Athletic Center (4,473); Piscataway, NJ
Big Ten Conference tournament
Mar 9, 2016; 7:00 pm, BTN	(14)	vs. (11) Nebraska; First round	L 72–89	7–25	Bankers Life Fieldhouse (16,528); Indianapolis, IN
*Non-conference game. ^{#}Rankings from AP Poll. (#) Tournament seedings in parentheses. All times are in Eastern Time ‡: Although Rutgers counts this as a regular season game, Rutgers-Newark does not and considers it an exhibition game for their schedule..

== See also ==
- 2015–16 Rutgers Scarlet Knights women's basketball team
