= 2015–16 Big Ten Conference men's basketball season =

- League: NCAA Division I
- Sport: Basketball
- Teams: 14
- TV partner(s): Big Ten Network, ESPN, CBS

2015–16 NCAA Division I men's basketball season
- Regular season champions: Indiana
- Runners-up: Michigan State
- Season MVP: Denzel Valentine
- Top scorer: Denzel Valentine

Tournament
- Venue: Bankers Life Fieldhouse, Indianapolis, Indiana
- Champions: Michigan State
- Runners-up: Purdue
- Finals MVP: Denzel Valentine

Basketball seasons
- 2014–15 2016–17

2015–16 Big Ten Conference men's basketball standings
	Conf.				Overall
Team	W		L	PCT	W		L	PCT
No. 14 Indiana	15	–	3	.833	27	–	8	.771
No. 2 Michigan State †	13	–	5	.722	29	–	6	.829
No. 18 Maryland	12	–	6	.667	27	–	9	.750
No. 12 Purdue	12	–	6	.667	26	–	9	.743
No. 25 Iowa	12	–	6	.667	22	–	11	.667
Wisconsin	12	–	6	.667	22	–	13	.629
Ohio State	11	–	7	.611	21	–	14	.600
Michigan	10	–	8	.556	23	–	13	.639
Northwestern	8	–	10	.444	20	–	12	.625
Penn State	7	–	11	.389	16	–	16	.500
Nebraska	6	–	12	.333	16	–	18	.471
Illinois	5	–	13	.278	15	–	19	.441
Minnesota	2	–	16	.111	11	–	20	.355
Rutgers	1	–	17	.056	7	–	25	.219
† 2016 Big Ten tournament winner Rankings from AP poll

The 2015–16 Big Ten men's basketball season began with practices in October 2015, followed by the start of the 2015–16 NCAA Division I men's basketball season in November. Conference play began in late December and concluded in March, 2016.

Indiana won the Big Ten regular season by two games over second place Michigan State. Four teams tied for third place.

Denzel Valentine was the Conference Player of the Year and won many national player of the year awards (splitting them with Buddy Hield). Valentine and Jarrod Uthoff were consensus All-Americans, while Yogi Ferrell also received some All-American recognition. Uthoff was named Academic All-America Team Member of the Year, while Shavon Shields and Mike Gessell were also named Academic All-America. Tom Crean was named Big Ten Coach of the Year.

Following the season, Tom Izzo was elected to the Naismith Memorial Basketball Hall of Fame. After taking over for Bo Ryan midseason, Greg Gard was named the Jim Phelan National Coach of the Year Award winner.

The Big Ten tournament was held from March 9–13, 2016 at Bankers Life Fieldhouse in Indianapolis, Indiana. Michigan State won the tournament championship by defeating Purdue in the championship game. As a result, the Spartans received the conference's automatic bid to the NCAA tournament.

Seven Big Ten schools (Michigan State, Indiana, Maryland, Purdue, Iowa, Wisconsin, and Michigan) were invited to the NCAA Tournament marking the sixth consecutive year the Big ten had at least six teams in the Tournament. The conference sent three teams to the Sweet Sixteen (Indiana, Maryland, and Wisconsin), marking the ninth consecutive season multiple Big Ten teams advanced to the Sweet Sixteen. In the previous four seasons, at least one Big Ten team reached the Final Four, however no Big Ten team made it past the Sweet Sixteen. The conference achieved an 8–7 record in the Tournament. Ohio State also received a bid to the National Invitation Tournament, losing in the first round.

Nine Big Ten teams won 20 games on the season marking the first time in history this occurred.

== Head coaches ==
Team	Head coach	Previous job	Year at school	Overall record	Big Ten record	Big Ten titles	NCAA Tournaments	NCAA Final Fours	NCAA Championships
Illinois	John Groce	Ohio	4th	62–42	24–30	0	1	0	0
Indiana	Tom Crean	Marquette	8th	121–109	49–77	1	3	1	0
Iowa	Fran McCaffery	Siena	6th	96–75	42–48	0	2	0	0
Maryland	Mark Turgeon	Texas A&M	5th	87–50	14–4*	0	1	0	0
Michigan	John Beilein	West Virginia	9th	166–110	78–66	2	5	1	0
Michigan State	Tom Izzo	Michigan State (Asst.)	21st	495–199	233–107	7	19	7	1
Minnesota	Richard Pitino	Florida International	3rd	43–28	14–22	0	0	0	0
Nebraska	Tim Miles	Colorado State	4th	47–49	21–33	0	1	0	0
Northwestern	Chris Collins	Duke (Asst.)	3rd	29–36	12–24	0	0	0	0
Ohio State	Thad Matta	Xavier	12th	299–94	132–60	5	9	2	0
Penn State	Pat Chambers	Boston University	5th	56–75	16–56	0	0	0	0
Purdue	Matt Painter	Purdue (Assoc.)	11th	212–124	101–75	1	7	0	0
Rutgers	Eddie Jordan	Los Angeles Lakers (Asst.)	2nd	10–22	2–16	0	0	0	0
Wisconsin	Bo Ryan*	UW–Milwaukee	15th	357–125	172–68	4	14	2	0

Notes:

- Year at school includes 2015–16 season.
- Overall and Big Ten records are from time at current school and are before the beginning of the season.
- Turgeon's ACC conference record excluded since Maryland began Big Ten Conference play in 2014–15
- On December 16, 2015, following a win versus Texas A&M–Corpus Christi, Bo Ryan officially retired as head coach of Wisconsin. Greg Gard took over on interim basis.
- Media guide source for content.

== Preseason ==
Big Ten recruits at the 2015 McDonald's All-American Boys Game

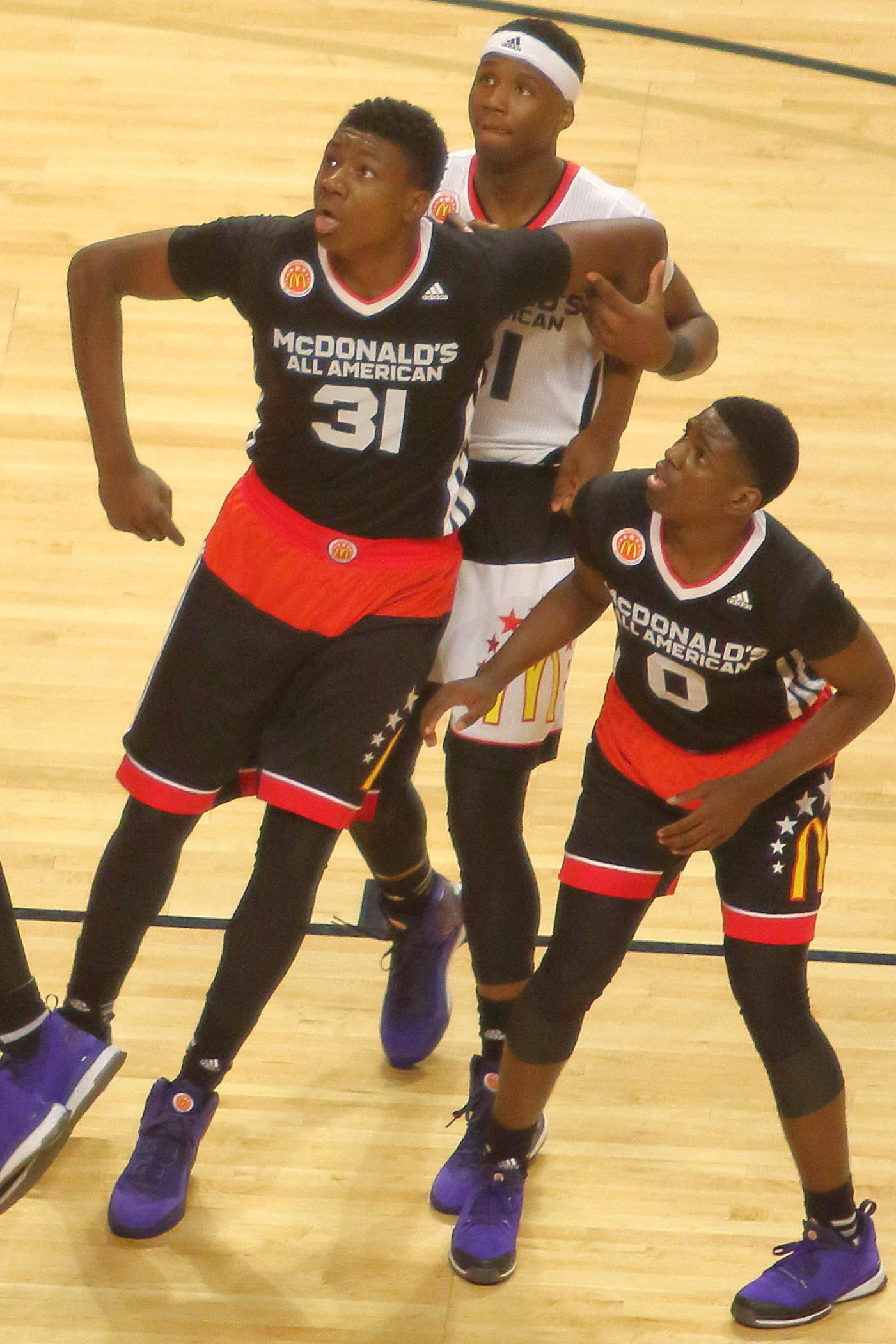
Thomas Bryant, Indiana

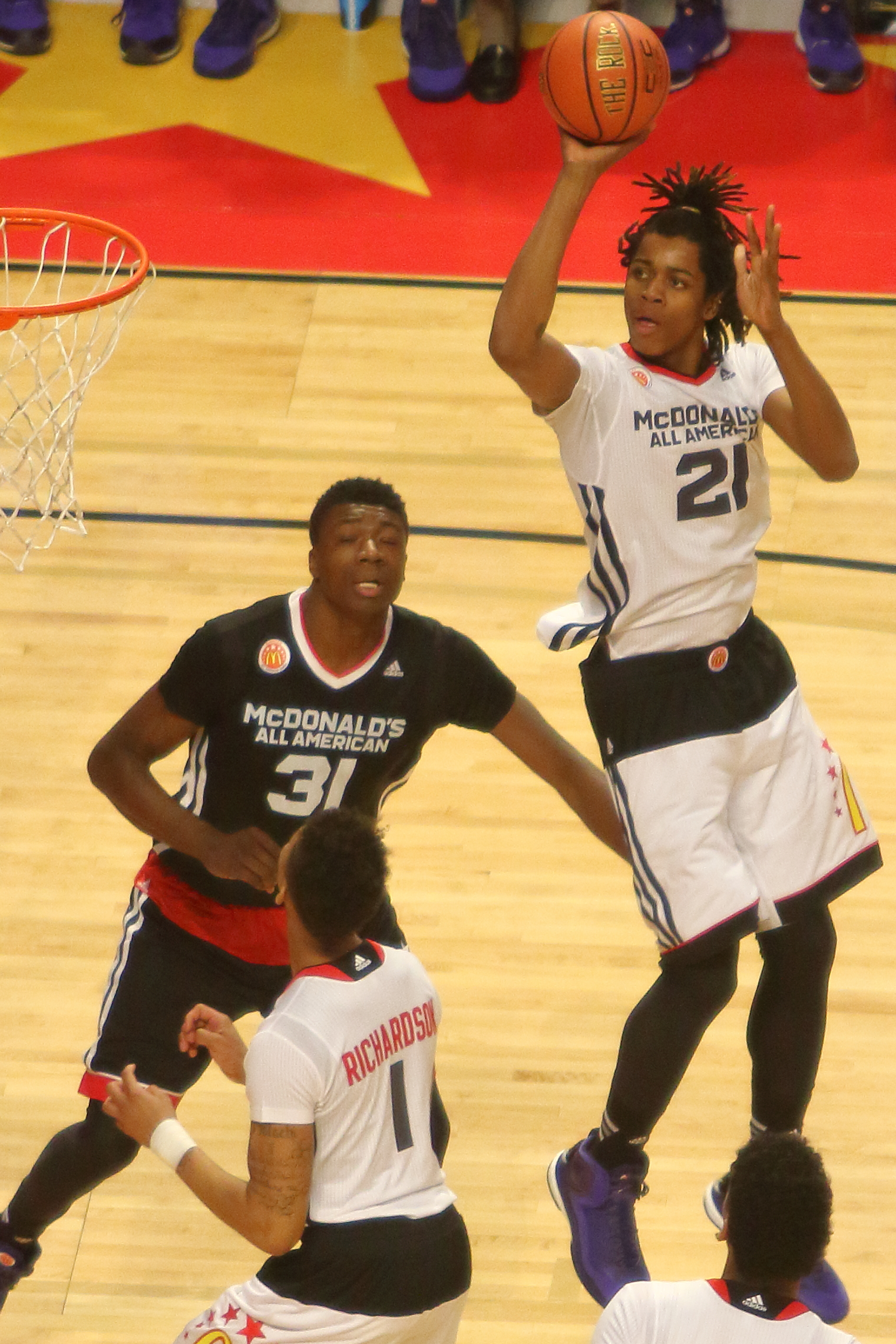
Deyonta Davis, Michigan State

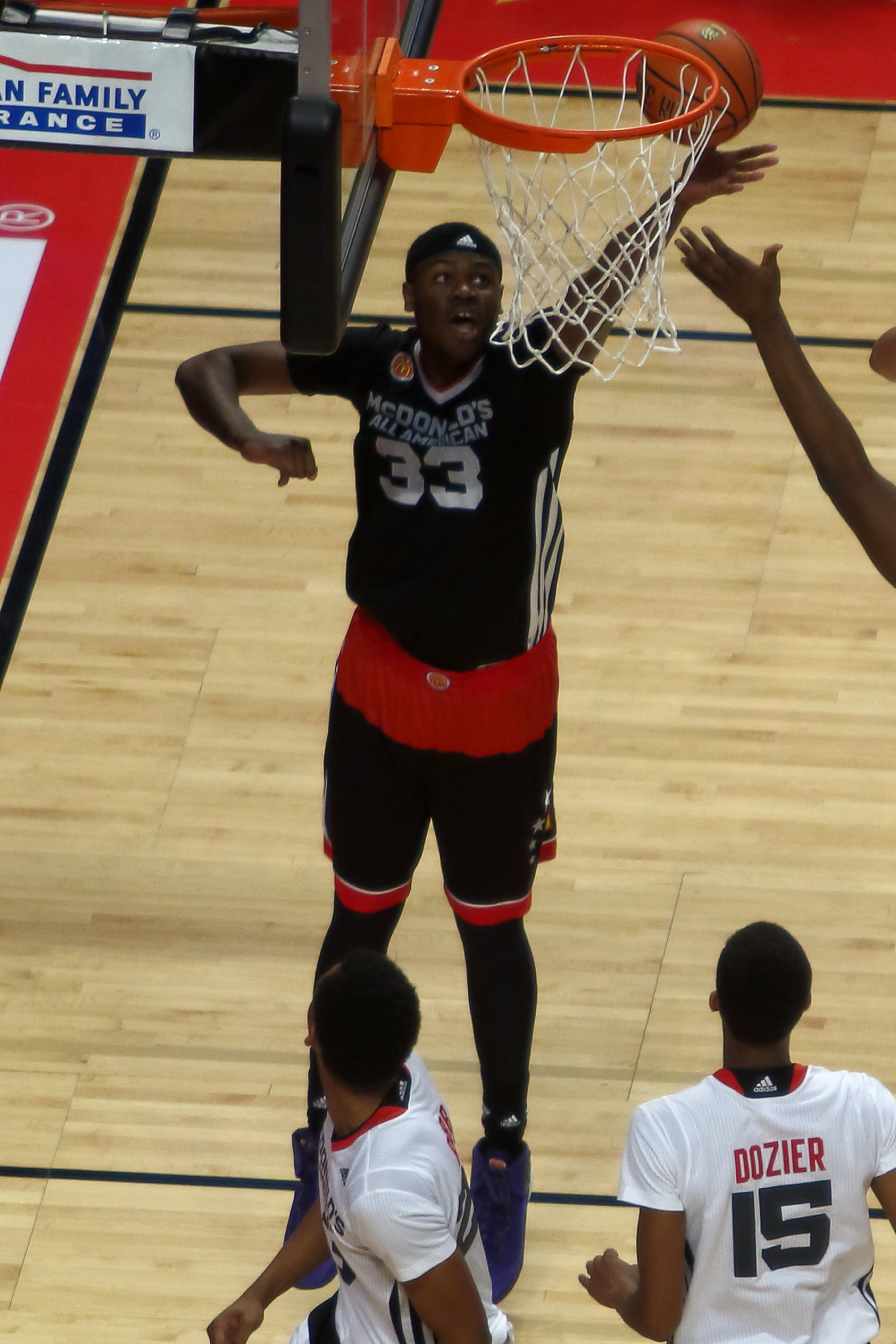
Diamond Stone, Maryland

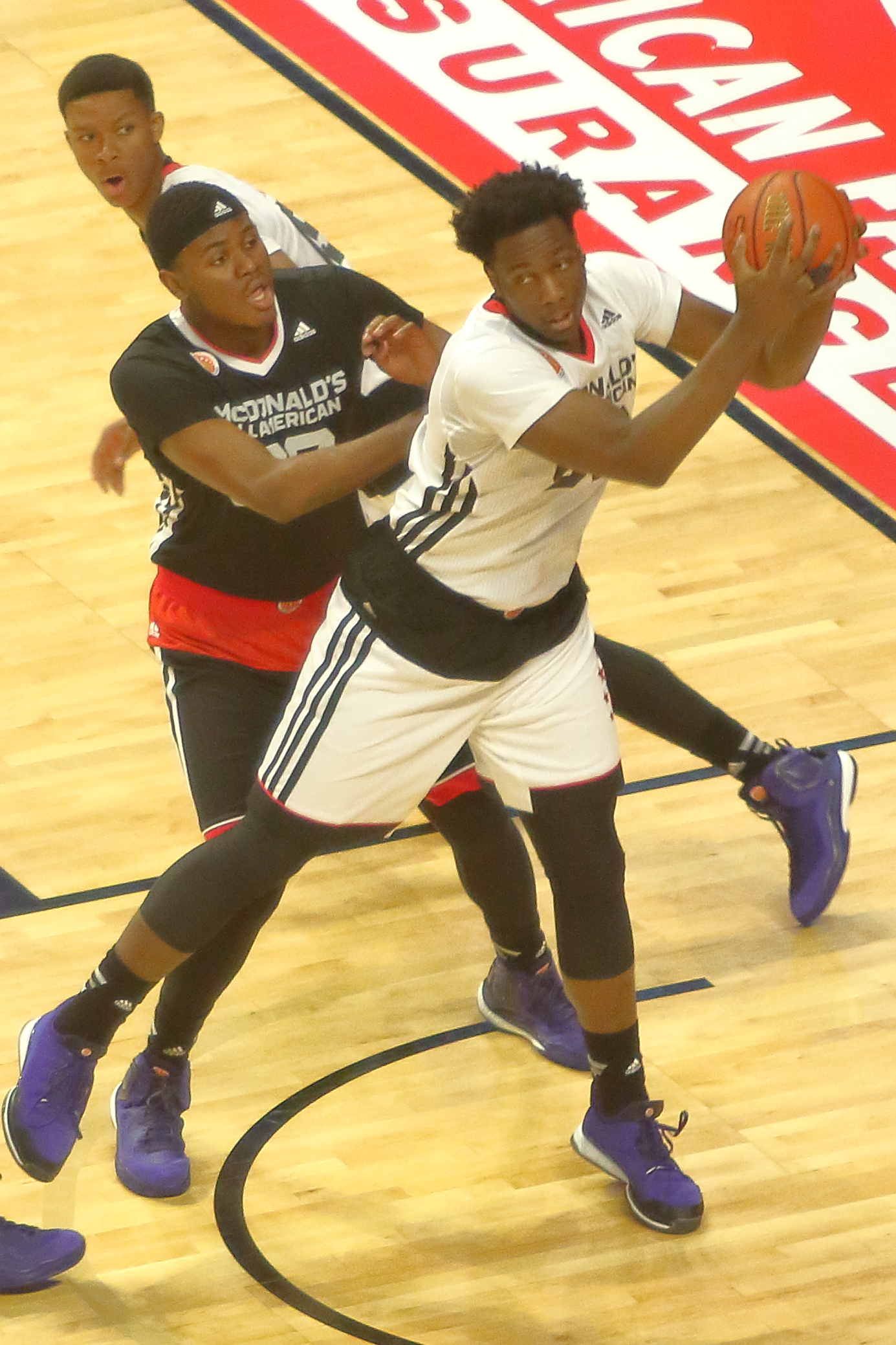
Caleb Swanigan, Purdue

In late October some schools celebrated Midnight Madness. The Big Ten teams would begin their seasons between November 13 and 15.

According to the Big Ten media, Melo Trimble was the preseason conference player of the year and he was joined on the All-Big Ten preseason team by James Blackmon, Jr., Yogi Ferrell, Jarrod Uthoff, Jake Layman, Caris LeVert, Denzel Valentine, A. J. Hammons, Nigel Hayes, and Bronson Koenig. Valentine, Hammons, Hayes and Trimble were all unanimous selections. According to the Big Ten Network, the preseason All-Big Ten team was composed of Trimble, Ferrell, Hayes, LeVert, and Valentine. Trimble, Ferrell, and Hayes were unanimous.

=== Preseason watchlists ===
Below is a table of notable preseason watch lists.

	Wooden	Naismith	Robertson	Cousy	West	Erving	Malone	Abdul-Jabbar	Olson	Tisdale
James Blackmon, Jr. IND	✓				✓					
Thomas Bryant IND								✓		
Yogi Ferrell IND	✓	✓	✓	✓					✓	
A. J. Hammons PUR	✓	✓						✓		
Nigel Hayes WIS	✓	✓	✓			✓			✓	
Bronson Koenig WIS	✓			✓						
Jake Layman MD	✓					✓				
Caris LeVert MICH	✓	✓	✓		✓					
Diamond Stone MD								✓		
Rasheed Sulaimon MD					✓					
Caleb Swanigan PUR		✓					✓			✓
Melo Trimble MD	✓	✓	✓	✓					✓	
Denzel Valentine MSU	✓	✓	✓			✓			✓	
Troy Williams IND	✓					✓				

The following players were selected to the 5 major positional preseason 20-man watch lists announced by the Naismith Memorial Basketball Hall of Fame:

- Bob Cousy Award (point guard): Yogi Ferrell, Melo Trimble, and Bronson Koenig
- Jerry West Award (shooting guard): James Blackmon, Jr., Rasheed Sulaimon, and Caris LeVert
- Julius Erving Award (small forward): Troy Williams, Jake Layman, Denzel Valentine and Nigel Hayes
- Karl Malone Award (power forward): Caleb Swanigan
- Kareem Abdul-Jabbar Award (center): Thomas Bryant, Diamond Stone and A. J. Hammons

Ferrell, Hayes, Valentine and Trimble were selected to the 30-man Lute Olson Award preseason watchlist.

Blackmon, Ferrel, Hammons, Hayes, Koenig, Layman, LeVert, Trimble, Valentine and Williams all made the initial 50-man John R. Wooden Award watch list on November 17. On December 2, the 50-man Naismith College Player of the Year watchlist, 33-man Robertson Trophy watchlist and 18-man Wayman Tisdale Award watchlist were announced. Naismith honorees were Ferrel, Hammons, Hayes, LeVert, Swanigan, Trimble, and Valentine. Robertson honorees were Ferrel, Hayes, LeVert, Trimble, and Valentine. Swanigan was the lone Tisdale honoree from the Big Ten. Iowa's Mike Gesell, Maryland's Varun Ram, Michigan's Spike Albrecht, Nebraska's Shavon Shields, Purdue's Rapheal Davis, Rutgers' Greg Lewis and Wisconsin's Hayes were named Allstate Good Works Team nominees.

=== Preseason All-American teams ===
	CBS	AP	TSN	USA Today	SB Nation	Blue Ribbon	Athlon Sports	Bleacher Report	NBC	BigTen.org	BTN	Sports Illustrated	Lindy's; Sports
James Blackmon, Jr.										✓			
Yogi Ferrell			2nd	2nd			3rd			✓	✓		
A. J. Hammons										✓			
Nigel Hayes	2nd		1st	3rd			3rd	3rd		✓	✓	2nd	1st
Bronson Koenig										✓			
Jake Layman										✓			
Caris LeVert							3rd			✓	✓		
Melo Trimble	2nd		3rd	1st			1st	3rd	2nd	✓	✓	2nd	3rd
Jarrod Uthoff										✓			
Denzel Valentine	3rd							3rd	2nd	✓	✓	2nd	

On October 6, CBS Sports announced its preseason All-American team, which included Trimble and Hayes on its 2nd team and Valentine on its 3rd team. Sporting News selected Hayes to its preseason All-American first team, Ferrell to its second team, and Trimble to its third team. Trimble was an Athlon Sports Preseason All-American 1st team selection, while Hayes, Ferrell and LeVert were 3rd team selections. Lindy's Sports did not name an All-America team, but did rank all college basketball players by position and presented a top 25 list at each position. It included Hayes as the top power forward and Trimble as the third best point guard. Hayes, Valentine and Trimble were second team selections by Sports Illustrated. On November 3, NBC Sports included Valentine and Trimble on its preseason All-American 2nd team. Trimble, Ferrell and Hayes were 1st, 2nd and 3rd team selections respectively by USA Today. Trimble, Valentine and Hayes were all third team selections by Bleacher Report. Trimble was one vote shy of tying Ben Simmons for the fifth and final spot on the Associated Press pre-season All-American team. No Big Ten player made the Blue Ribbon College Basketball Yearbook preseason All-America first team.

=== Preseason polls ===
Maryland was the unanimous selection by the Big Ten Network to top the preseason conference rankings.

The Big Ten had 5 teams ranked in the preseason Coaches' Poll (Maryland at No. 3, No. 13 Michigan State, No. 15 Indiana, No. 17 Wisconsin and Purdue, which was tied for No. 24) and six in the preseason AP Poll (Maryland at No. 3, No. 13 Michigan State, No. 15 Indiana, No. 17 Wisconsin, No. 23 Purdue and No. 25 Michigan).

According to Athlon Sports, the preseason top 25 included Maryland (No. 4), Michigan State (No. 12), Purdue (No. 16), Indiana (No. 17), Wisconsin (No. 19), and Michigan (No. 22). CBS Sports listed Maryland (No. 4), Michigan State (No. 11), Indiana (No. 13), Wisconsin (No. 17), and Purdue (No. 26) in its preseason rankings. Sporting News ranked five Big Ten Teams among its Top 25: Indiana (No. 3), Indiana (No. 15), Michigan (No. 18), Wisconsin (No. 20) and Michigan State (No. 23). Lindy's Sports ranked Maryland number 1, Indiana number 4, Purdue number 21 and Michigan State number 23 in its top 25. Michigan was among the other 15 teams mentioned (at number 33). NBC Sports ranked Maryland 2, Michigan State 9, Indiana 14, Michigan 17, Purdue 21 and Wisconsin 25. ESPN's 10-person panel selected Maryland number 1, Indiana 14, Michigan State 15, Wisconsin 17, Michigan 22, and Purdue 24. Sports Illustrated ranked all 351 teams. The following teams were in its top 25: Maryland 5, Indiana 14, and Michigan State 15 (but also listed 3 Big Ten teams in positions 26–28). Bleacher Report ranked Maryland 4, Indiana 12, Michigan State 13 and Purdue 18. Blue Ribbon College Basketball Yearbook selected Maryland 2, Indiana 13, Michigan State 15, Michigan 17 and Purdue 19. The United States Basketball Writers Association (USBWA) ranked 1. Maryland (8); 13. Indiana; 15. Michigan State; 18. Purdue; 23. Michigan; and 25. Wisconsin.

	AP	Coaches	CBS	NBC	Sporting; News	Sports; Illustrated	Blue Ribbon; Yearbook	Bleacher; Report	Athlon; Sports	Lindy's; Sports	ESPN	USBWA
Illinois												
Indiana	15	15	13	14	15	14	13	12	17	4	14	13
Iowa												
Maryland	3	3	4	2	3	5	2	4	4	1	1	1
Michigan	25			17	18		17		22		22	23
Michigan State	13	13	11	9	23	15	15	13	12	23	15	15
Minnesota												
Nebraska												
Northwestern												
Ohio State												
Penn State												
Purdue	23	24T	26	21			19		16	21	24	18
Rutgers												
Wisconsin	17	17	17	25	20			18	19		17	25

== Regular season ==
=== Conference schedules ===
Before the season, it was announced that the Big Ten Network would televise 75 games including 9 straight Wednesday doubleheaders and regular Saturday and Sunday doubleheaders. The schedule also included an extensive slate of ESPN Inc. family of networks (ESPN, ESPN2 and ESPNU) Tuesday and Thursday night of the conference season coverage and CBS Sports scheduled games for Saturday or Sunday afternoons starting January 10, 2016. CBS will carry the semifinals and finals of the 2016 Big Ten Conference men's basketball tournament, marking the 19th consecutive year that they have covered the Big Ten Conference men's basketball tournament. All teams begin a balanced 18-game conference game schedule during the week of December 28 – January 3 in which teams play home and away against 5 teams, home against 4 teams and away against the remaining 4 opponents. On January 30, the conference scheduled its inaugural annual "Super Saturday – College Hoops & Hockey" doubleheader featuring a basketball game between Michigan and Penn State followed by a hockey game between the teams from the same schools at Madison Square Garden.

=== 2015 ACC–Big Ten Challenge (Big Ten 8–6) ===
Date	Time	ACC team	B1G team	Score	Location	Television	Attendance	Challenge leader
Nov 30	7:00 pm	**Wake Forest**	Rutgers	69–68	Louis Brown Athletic Center • Piscataway, New Jersey	ESPNU	3,817	ACC (1–0)
Nov 30	9:00 pm	Clemson	**Minnesota**	89–83	Williams Arena • Minneapolis, Minnesota	ESPN2	10,229	Tied (1–1)
Dec 1	7:00 pm	NC State	**Michigan**	66–59	PNC Arena • Raleigh, North Carolina	ESPN2	17,645	B1G (2–1)
Dec 1	7:00 pm	Virginia Tech	**Northwestern**	81–79^{OT}	Cassell Coliseum • Blacksburg, Virginia	ESPNU	4,879	B1G (3–1)
Dec 1	7:30 pm	No. 10 **Virginia**	Ohio State	64–58	Value City Arena • Columbus, Ohio	ESPN	12,445	B1G (3–2)
Dec 1	9:00 pm	No. 21 **Miami**	Nebraska	77–72^{OT}	Pinnacle Bank Arena • Lincoln, Nebraska	ESPNU	15,646	Tied (3–3)
Dec 1	9:00 pm	Pittsburgh	No. 11 **Purdue**	72–59	Petersen Events Center • Pittsburgh, Pennsylvania	ESPN2	9,439	B1G (4–3)
Dec 1	9:30 pm	No. 9 **North Carolina**	No. 2 Maryland	89–81	Dean Smith Center • Chapel Hill, North Carolina	ESPN	21,163	Tied (4–4)
Dec 2	7:15 pm	No. 24 Louisville	No. 3 **Michigan State**	71–67	Breslin Center • East Lansing, Michigan	ESPN	14,797	B1G (5–4)
Dec 2	7:15 pm	No. 14 Syracuse	**Wisconsin**	66–58^{OT}	Carrier Dome • Syracuse, New York	ESPN2	22,360	B1G (6–4)
Dec 2	7:15 pm	Boston College	**Penn State**	67–58	Conte Forum • Chestnut Hill, Massachusetts	ESPNU	2,165	B1G (7–4)
Dec 2	9:15 pm	No. 7 **Duke**	Indiana	94–74	Cameron Indoor Stadium • Durham, North Carolina	ESPN	9,314	B1G (7–5)
Dec 2	9:15 pm	**Notre Dame**	Illinois	84–79	State Farm Center • Champaign, Illinois	ESPN2	14,953	B1G (7–6)
Dec 2	9:15 pm	Florida State	**Iowa**	78–75^{OT}	Carver–Hawkeye Arena • Iowa City, Iowa	ESPNU	11,247	B1G (8–6)
**Winners are in bold** Game times in EST. Rankings from AP Poll (Nov 30). Georgia Tech did not play due to the ACC having one more team than the B1G.

=== 2015 Gavitt Tipoff Games (Tied 4–4) ===
Date	Time	Big East team	Big Ten team	Score	Location	Television	Attendance	Leader
Tue., Nov. 17	5:00 PM	DePaul	**Penn State**	68–62	Bryce Jordan Center • University Park, PA	ESPNU	5,023	Big Ten (1–0)
Tue., Nov. 17	8:30 PM	No. 11 **Villanova**	Nebraska	87–63	The Pavilion • Villanova, PA	FS1	6,500	Tied (1–1)
Tue., Nov. 17	9:00 PM	Georgetown	No. 3 **Maryland**	75–71	XFINITY Center • College Park, MD	ESPN2	17,950	Big Ten (2–1)
Wed., Nov. 18	7:00 PM	**Providence**	Illinois	60–59	Dunkin' Donuts Center • Providence, RI	FS1	8,069	Tied (2–2)
Thu., Nov. 19	7:00 PM	**St. John's**	Rutgers	61–59	Carnesecca Arena • Queens, NY	FS1	4,540	Big East (3–2)
Thu., Nov. 19	7:00 PM	Creighton	**Indiana**	86–65	Simon Skjodt Assembly Hall • Bloomington, IN	BTN	17,472	Tied (3–3)
Thu., Nov. 19	9:00 PM	Marquette	**Iowa**	89–61	BMO Harris Bradley Center • Milwaukee, WI	FS1	13,297	Big Ten (4–3)
Fri., Nov. 20	9:00 PM	**Xavier**	No. 24 Michigan	86–70	Crisler Center • Ann Arbor, MI	BTN	11,967	Tied (4–4)
**WINNERS ARE IN BOLD**. Game Times in EST. Rankings from AP Poll (Nov 16). Did not participate: Butler, Seton Hall (Big East); Michigan State, Minnesota, Northwestern, Ohio State, Purdue, Wisconsin (Big Ten)

=== Rankings ===
The Big Ten had 5 teams ranked (Indiana, Maryland, Michigan State, Purdue, and Wisconsin) and 3 others (Iowa, Michigan, and Ohio State) receiving votes in the preseason Coaches' Poll. It had 6 teams ranked (Indiana, Maryland, Michigan, Michigan State, Purdue, and Wisconsin)in the preseason AP Poll and 1 other (Iowa) receiving votes. Wisconsin dropped from the ranking by Week 2, while Michigan dropped in Week 3, and Indiana went unranked in Week 4. Michigan State ascended to the number 1 ranking in the fifth week of the season and has retained the number 1 ranking for three consecutive weeks.

Legend
	Improvement in ranking
	Drop in ranking
	Not ranked previous week
RV	Received votes but were not ranked in Top 25 of poll
(Italics)	Number of first place votes

		Pre/ Wk 1	Wk 2	Wk 3	Wk 4	Wk 5	Wk 6	Wk 7	Wk 8	Wk 9	Wk 10	Wk 11	Wk 12	Wk 13	Wk 14	Wk 15	Wk 16	Wk 17	Wk 18	Wk 19	Final
Illinois	AP																				N/A*
Illinois	C																				
Indiana	AP	15	14	13	RV	RV				RV	RV	25	19	22	RV	22	18	12	10	14	N/A
Indiana	C	15	15	14	RV	RV	RV	RV	RV	RV	25	23	17	21	22	21	15	11	10	12	9
Iowa	AP	RV	RV	RV	RV	RV	RV	RV	RV	19	16	9	3	5	4 (11)	4	8	16	20	25	N/A
Iowa	C	RV		RV	RV	RV	RV	RV		23	19	9	4	7	5 (3)	6	8	15	18	24	25
Maryland	AP	3 (14)	3 (14)	2 (6)	2 (4)	6	6	4	4	3	3	7	8	4	2 (13)	6	10	14	18	18	N/A
Maryland	C	3 (5)	3 (3)	2 (3)	2 (3)	9 (1)	7	4	4	3	3	5	7	3	2 (11)	5	9	12	15	17	12
Michigan	AP	25	24	RV						RV			RV	RV	RV	RV				RV	N/A
Michigan	C	RV	25	RV								RV	RV	RV		RV	RV				
Michigan State	AP	13	13	3	3 (2)	1 (62)	1 (64)	1 (64)	1 (64)	5	4 (1)	11	12	10	8	8	6	2 (2)	2 (2)	2 (2)	N/A
Michigan State	C	13	13	4	3	1 (26)	1 (28)	1 (29)	1 (27)	5 (1)	4	10	11	10	9 (1)	9	7	3 (1)	3 (1)	2 (1)	7
Minnesota	AP																				N/A
Minnesota	C																				
Nebraska	AP																				N/A
Nebraska	C																				
Northwestern	AP					RV	RV	RV	RV												N/A
Northwestern	C						RV														
Ohio State	AP																				N/A
Ohio State	C	RV																			
Penn State	AP																				N/A
Penn State	C																				
Purdue	AP	23	21	16	11	11	9	14	14	20	24	22	21	18	18	17	20	15	13	12	N/A
Purdue	C	24T	23	15	11	11	8	13	14	18	24	22	21	16	16	16	19	13	13	10	19
Rutgers	AP																				N/A
Rutgers	C																				
Wisconsin	AP	17	RV													RV	RV	RV	RV	RV	N/A
Wisconsin	C	17	RV													RV	RV	RV	25	RV	23

*AP does not release post-NCAA tournament rankings

=== Players of the week ===
Throughout the conference regular season, the Big Ten offices named one or two players of the week and one or two freshmen of the week each Monday.

Week	Player of the week	Freshman of the week
November 16, 2015	Joey King, MINN	Caleb Swanigan, PUR
November 16, 2015	Alex Olah, NU	Caleb Swanigan, PUR
November 23, 2015	Denzel Valentine, MSU	Thomas Bryant, IND
November 30, 2015	Denzel Valentine (2), MSU	Deyonta Davis, MSU
December 7, 2015	A. J. Hammons, PUR	Jordan Murphy, MINN
December 14, 2015	Jarrod Uthoff, IOWA	Caleb Swanigan (2), PUR
December 14, 2015	Melo Trimble, MD	Caleb Swanigan (2), PUR
December 21, 2015	Malcolm Hill, ILL	Nicholas Baer, IOWA
December 21, 2015	Caris LeVert, MICH	Nicholas Baer, IOWA
December 28, 2015	Bryn Forbes, MSU	Corey Sanders, RUT
December 28, 2015	A. J. Hammons (2), PUR	Corey Sanders, RUT
January 4, 2016	Diamond Stone, MD	Diamond Stone, MD
January 11, 2016	Mike Gesell, IOWA	Thomas Bryant (2), IND
January 18, 2016	Peter Jok, IOWA	JaQuan Lyle, OSU
January 18, 2016	Peter Jok, IOWA	Ethan Happ, WIS
January 25, 2016	Yogi Ferrell, IND	Ethan Happ (2), WIS
February 1, 2016	A. J. Hammons (3), PUR	Deyonta Davis (2), MSU
February 1, 2016	A. J. Hammons (3), PUR	Ethan Happ (3), WIS
February 8, 2016	Denzel Valentine (3), MSU	Corey Sanders (2), RUT
February 15, 2016	Denzel Valentine (4), MSU	Glynn Watson, Jr., NEB
February 22, 2016	Troy Williams, IND	Jordan Murphy (2), MINN
February 22, 2016	Brandon Taylor, PSU	Jordan Murphy (2), MINN
February 29, 2016	Yogi Ferrell (2), IND	Jalen Coleman-Lands, ILL
March 7, 2016	Bryn Forbes (2), MSU	Caleb Swanigan (3), PUR

On November 17 in the Champions Classic, Denzel Valentine led Michigan State over Kansas by posting the first triple-double of the 2015–16 NCAA Division I men's basketball season with 29 points, 12 rebounds and 12 assists. On January 5, Diamond Stone was named national freshman of the week by the United States Basketball Writers Association.

=== Conference matrix ===
This table summarizes the head-to-head results between teams in conference play. Each team played 18 conference games, and at least 1 against each opponent.

	Illinois	Indiana	Iowa	Maryland	Michigan	Michigan St	Minnesota	Nebraska	Northwestern	Ohio St	Penn St	Purdue	Rutgers	Wisconsin
vs. Illinois	–	2–0	1–0	1–0	1–0	1–0	0–2	1–0	1–0	2–0	1–0	0–1	0–2	2–0
vs. Indiana	0–2	–	0–2	0–1	0–1	1–0	0–2	0–2	0–1	0–1	1–0	0–1	0–1	1–1
vs. Iowa	0–1	2–0	–	1–0	0–2	0–2	0–1	0–1	0–1	1–0	1–1	0–2	0–1	1–0
vs. Maryland	0–1	1–0	0–1	–	1–1	1–0	1–0	0–1	0–2	0–2	0–1	1–1	0–1	1–1
vs. Michigan	0–1	1–0	2–0	1–1	–	1–0	0–2	0–1	0–1	1–0	0–2	1–1	0–1	1–0
vs. Michigan St	0–1	0–1	2–0	0–1	0–1	–	0–1	1–0	0–1	0–2	0–2	1–0	0–2	1–1
vs. Minnesota	2–0	2–0	1–0	0–1	2–0	1–0	–	1–0	2–0	1–0	1–0	1–0	1–1	1–0
vs. Nebraska	0–1	2–0	1–0	1–0	1–0	0–1	0–1	–	2–0	1–0	1–1	2–0	0–2	1–0
vs. Northwestern	0–1	1–0	1–0	2–0	1–0	1–0	0–2	0–2	–	2–0	1–1	1–0	0–1	0–1
vs. Ohio State	0–2	1–0	0–1	2–0	0–1	2–0	0–1	0–1	0–2	–	0–1	1–0	0–2	1–0
vs. Penn State	0–1	0–1	1–1	1–0	2–0	2–0	0–1	1–1	1–1	1–0	–	1–0	0–1	1–0
vs. Purdue	1–0	1–0	2–0	1–1	1–1	0–1	0–1	0–2	0–1	0–1	0–1	–	0–1	0–2
vs. Rutgers	2–0	1–0	1–0	1–0	1–0	2–0	1–1	2–0	1–0	2–0	1–0	1–0	–	1–0
vs. Wisconsin	0–2	1–1	0–1	1–1	0–1	1–1	0–1	0–1	1–0	0–1	0–1	2–0	0–1	–
Total	5–13	15–3	12–6	12–6	10–8	13–5	2–16	6–12	8–10	11–7	7–11	12–6	1–17	12–6

== Midseason watchlists ==
LeVert, Trimble, Uthoff and Valentine were among the 25 players included in the Wooden Award Midseason Top 25 Watch List on January 13. On January 19, 30 Senior CLASS Award candidates were named including Rapheal Davis, Mike Gesell, Shavon Shields, and Valentine. The January 25, 20-man Oscar Robertson Trophy midseason watch list included Ferrell, Trimble, Uthoff, and Valentine, while the 10-man Integris Wayman Tisdale Award midseason watch lists named Stone and Swanigan. On February 1, Ferrell and Trimble were among the 10 mid-season finalists for the Cousy Award. On February 2, Malcolm Hill and Levert were among the 10 mid-season finalists for the West Award. On February 3, Valentine and Hayes were among the 10 mid-season finalists for the Erving Award. On February 5, Hammons was among the 10 mid-season finalists for the Jabbar Award. Shavon Shields was named an Allstate NABC Good Works Team selections on February 9. Mike Gesell, Jarrod Uthoff, Colby Wollenman and Shavon Shields were named 2015-16 CoSIDA Academic-All District selections on February 11, making it two straight seasons that each was among the 40 finalists for the 15-man Academic All-America team. On that same day Ferrell, Hammons, Trimble, Uthoff and Valentine were included in the Naismith Award Late season Top 35 Watch List. Ferrell, Trimble, Uthoff and Valentine were included in the Wooden Award Late season Top 20 Watch List on February 12. On the same day, Tom Izzo, Bo Ryan and Lefty Driesell were named finalists for the Naismith Memorial Basketball Hall of Fame. On February 18, Valentine was named one of 10 senior finalists for the 2015-16 Senior CLASS Award. On February 29, Valentine and Uthoff were among the 11 finalists for the Robertson Trophy. Valentine was named one of four finalists for the Naismith Player of the Year Trophy on March 20, while Crean was named one of four finalist for Naismith Coach of the Year. Valentine and Ferrell were among the 10 finalist for the Wooden Award on March 29.

== Honors and awards ==
Michigan State Spartans men's basketball's Tom Izzo was elected to the Naismith Memorial Basketball Hall of Fame. After taking over for Bo Ryan midseason, Greg Gard was named the Jim Phelan National Coach of the Year Award winner.

Valentine earned numerous National Player of the Year awards: NABC Player of the Year, Basketball Times, Sports Illustrated, USA Today, and NBC Sports. He earned the Senior CLASS Award as the outstanding senior student-athlete in Division I men's basketball. Valentine was recognized as the Julius Erving Small Forward of the Year Award winner. He also earned the Lute Olson Award as the most outstanding non-freshman men's college basketball player in NCAA Division I competition.

Uthoff was named Academic All-America Team Member of the Year and was joined on the Academic All-America first team by Shields. Gessell was named to the second team.

Valentine, Uthoff and Ferrell received broad support as 2016 NCAA Men's Basketball All-Americans. USA Today and ESPN named Valentine (1st team), Ferrell (2nd team) and Uthoff (3rd team) All-Americans. NBC Sports and Sporting News selected Valentine (1st team), Ferrell (2nd team) and Uthoff (2nd team). USBWA named Valentine a first team selection and Uthoff a second team selection. Sports Illustrated named Valentine a first team selection and Ferrell, Uthoff and Trimble as honorable mentions. NABC and Associated Press named Valentine to their first teams and Ferrell and Uthoff to their third teams. CBS Sports selected Valentine to its first team and Ferrell to its third team.

With an average attendance of 12,555 fans per game, including home games and the 2016 Big Ten Men's Basketball Tournament, the Big Ten Conference led the nation in men's basketball attendance for the 40th consecutive season according to the NCAA. Maryland enjoyed the largest season-over-season increase with a 5,169 fan jump. This put Maryland on top attendance rankings of the 11 top-40 Big Ten conference members: Maryland (5th, 17,863), Wisconsin (6th, 17,287), Indiana (7th, 17,106), Nebraska (11th, 15,429), Michigan State (13th, 14,797), Iowa (19th, 13,835), Purdue (20th, 13,662), Illinois (27th, 12,723), Ohio State (28th, 12,283), Michigan (33th, 11,611) and Minnesota (38th, 10,706). The Big Ten outpaced other top conferences by over 1000 fans again: SEC (11,144), ACC (11,131), Big 12 (10, 124) and Big East (9,595).

=== All-Big Ten Awards and Teams ===
On March 7, The Big Ten announced most of its conference awards. Valentine was also named the Big Ten Athlete of the Year on June 22.

Honor-	Coaches	Media
Player of the Year	Denzel Valentine, Michigan State	Denzel Valentine, Michigan State
Coach of the Year	Tom Crean, Indiana	Tom Crean, Indiana
Freshman of the Year	Ethan Happ, Wisconsin	Ethan Happ, Wisconsin
Defensive Player of the Year	A. J. Hammons, Purdue	Not Selected
Sixth Man of the Year	Max Bielfeldt, Indiana	Not Selected
All-Big Ten First Team	Yogi Ferrell, Indiana	Yogi Ferrell, Indiana
All-Big Ten First Team	Denzel Valentine, Michigan State	Denzel Valentine, Michigan State
All-Big Ten First Team	Jarrod Uthoff, Iowa	Jarrod Uthoff, Iowa
All-Big Ten First Team	A. J. Hammons, Purdue	A. J. Hammons, Purdue
All-Big Ten First Team	Nigel Hayes, Wisconsin	Nigel Hayes, Wisconsin
All-Big Ten Second Team	Malcolm Hill, Illinois	Malcolm Hill, Illinois
All-Big Ten Second Team	Peter Jok, Iowa	Peter Jok, Iowa
All-Big Ten Second Team	Melo Trimble, Maryland	Melo Trimble, Maryland
All-Big Ten Second Team	Bryn Forbes, Michigan State	Bryn Forbes, Michigan State
All-Big Ten Second Team	Shavon Shields, Nebraska	Matt Costello, Michigan State
All-Big Ten Third Team	Matt Costello, Michigan State	Shavon Shields, Nebraska
All-Big Ten Third Team	Diamond Stone, Maryland	Diamond Stone, Maryland
All-Big Ten Third Team	Troy Williams, Indiana	Troy Williams, Indiana
All-Big Ten Third Team	Thomas Bryant, Indiana	Brandon Taylor, Penn State
All-Big Ten Third Team	Bronson Koenig, Wisconsin	Ethan Happ, Wisconsin
All-Big Ten Third Team	Derrick Walton, Michigan	
All-Big Ten Honorable Mention		Derrick Walton, Michigan
All-Big Ten Honorable Mention	Brandon Taylor, Penn State	Thomas Bryant, Indiana
All-Big Ten Honorable Mention	Ethan Happ, Wisconsin	Bronson Koenig, Wisconsin
All-Big Ten Honorable Mention	Robert Carter Jr., Maryland	Robert Carter Jr., Maryland
All-Big Ten Honorable Mention	Jake Layman, Maryland	Jake Layman, Maryland
All-Big Ten Honorable Mention	Rasheed Sulaimon, Maryland	Rasheed Sulaimon, Maryland
All-Big Ten Honorable Mention	Zak Irvin, Michigan	Zak Irvin, Michigan
All-Big Ten Honorable Mention	Andrew White III, Nebraska	Andrew White III, Nebraska
All-Big Ten Honorable Mention	Bryant McIntosh, Northwestern	Bryant McIntosh, Northwestern
All-Big Ten Honorable Mention	Keita Bates-Diop, Ohio State	Keita Bates-Diop, Ohio State
All-Big Ten Honorable Mention	Marc Loving, Ohio State	Marc Loving, Ohio State
All-Big Ten Honorable Mention	Jae'Sean Tate, Ohio State	Jae'Sean Tate, Ohio State
All-Big Ten Honorable Mention	Vincent Edwards, Purdue	Vincent Edwards, Purdue
All-Big Ten Honorable Mention	Not Selected	Mike Gesell, Iowa
All-Big Ten Honorable Mention	Not Selected	Adam Woodbury, Iowa
All-Big Ten Honorable Mention	Not Selected	Tre Demps, Northwestern
All-Big Ten Honorable Mention	Not Selected	Rapheal Davis, Purdue
All-Big Ten Honorable Mention	Not Selected	Caleb Swanigan, Purdue
All-Big Ten Honorable Mention	Not Selected	Corey Sanders, Rutgers
All-Freshman Team	Thomas Bryant, Indiana	Not Selected
All-Freshman Team	Diamond Stone, Maryland	Not Selected
All-Freshman Team	Ethan Happ, Wisconsin	Not Selected
All-Freshman Team	Caleb Swanigan, Purdue	Not Selected
All-Freshman Team	Jordan Murphy, Minnesota	Not Selected
All-Defensive Team	Jarrod Uthoff, Iowa	Not Selected
All-Defensive Team	Yogi Ferrell, Indiana	Not Selected
All-Defensive Team	Rapheal Davis, Purdue	Not Selected
All-Defensive Team	A. J. Hammons, Purdue	Not Selected
All-Defensive Team	Ethan Happ, Wisconsin	Not Selected

=== NABC ===
The National Association of Basketball Coaches announced their Division I All-District teams on March 25, recognizing the nation's best men's collegiate basketball student-athletes. Selected and voted on by member coaches of the NABC, the selections on this list were then eligible for NABC Coaches' All-America Honors. The following list represented the District 7 players chosen to the list.

First Team

- Jarrod Uthoff, Iowa
- Denzel Valentine, Michigan State
- Yogi Ferrell, Indiana
- A. J. Hammons, Purdue
- Melo Trimble, Maryland

Second Team

- Nigel Hayes, Wisconsin
- Peter Jok, Iowa
- Malcolm Hill, Illinois
- Matt Costello, Michigan State
- Robert Carter, Maryland

=== USBWA ===
On March 8, the U.S. Basketball Writers Association released its 2015–16 Men's All-District Teams, based upon voting from its national membership. There were nine regions from coast to coast, and a player and coach of the year were selected in each. The following lists all the Big Ten representatives selected within their respective regions.

District II (NY, NJ, DE, DC, PA, WV)
- none
District III (VA, NC, SC, MD)
- Melo Trimble, Maryland
District V (OH, IN, IL, MI, MN, WI)

Player of the Year

- Denzel Valentine, Michigan State

Coach of the Year

- Tom Crean, Indiana

All-District Team

- Yogi Ferrell, Indiana
- Bryn Forbes, Michigan State
- A. J. Hammons, Purdue
- Nigel Hayes, Wisconsin
- Malcolm Hill, Illinois
- Denzel Valentine, Michigan State
District VI (IA, MO, KS, OK, NE, ND, SD)
- Peter Jok, Iowa
- Jarrod Uthoff, Iowa

== Postseason ==
=== Big Ten tournament ===
Session	Game	Time*	Matchup^{#}	Score	Television	Attendance
First round – Wednesday, March 9
1	1	4:30 pm	#13 Minnesota vs. # 12 Illinois	52–85	ESPN2	16,528
1	2	7:00 pm	#14 Rutgers vs. #11 Nebraska	72–89	BTN	16,528
Second round – Thursday, March 10
2	3	12:00 pm	#8 Michigan vs. #9 Northwestern	72–70^{OT}	BTN	15,707
2	4	2:30 pm	#5 Iowa vs. #12 Illinois	66–68	BTN	15,707
3	5	6:30 pm	#7 Ohio State vs. #10 Penn State	79–75	ESPN2	15,751
3	6	9:00 pm	#6 Wisconsin vs. #11 Nebraska	58–70	ESPN2	15,751
Quarterfinals – Friday, March 11
4	7	12:00 pm	#1 Indiana vs. #8 Michigan	69–72	ESPN	18,355
4	8	2:30 pm	#4 Purdue vs. #12 Illinois	89–58	ESPN	18,355
5	9	6:30 pm	#2 Michigan State vs. #7 Ohio State	81–54	BTN	15,942
5	10	9:00 pm	#3 Maryland vs. #11 Nebraska	97–86	BTN	15,942
Semifinals – Saturday, March 12
6	11	1:00 pm	#4 Purdue vs. #8 Michigan	76–59	CBS	18,339
6	12	3:30 pm	#2 Michigan State vs. #3 Maryland	64–61	CBS	18,339
Championship – Sunday, March 13
7	13	3:00 pm	#2 Michigan State vs. #4 Purdue	66–62	CBS	16,429
*Game times in Eastern Time. The United States began Daylight saving time at 2:00 am on Sunday, March 13. Thus, times were in Eastern Standard Time except the Championship game which was in Eastern Daylight Time. #-Rankings denote tournament seed

=== NCAA tournament ===
The Big Ten Conference had seven bids to the 2016 NCAA Men's Division I Basketball Tournament.

Seed	Region	School	First Four	Round of 64	Round of 32	Sweet 16	Elite Eight	Final Four	Championship
2	Midwest	Michigan State	n/a	eliminated by (15) Middle Tennessee 81–90					
5	East	Indiana	n/a	defeated (12) Chattanooga 99–74	defeated (4) Kentucky 73–67	eliminated by (1) North Carolina 86–101			
5	South	Maryland	n/a	defeated (12) South Dakota State 79–74	defeated (13) Hawaii 73–60	eliminated by (1) Kansas 63–79			
5	Midwest	Purdue	n/a	eliminated by (12) Arkansas–Little Rock 83–85 (2OT)					
7	South	Iowa	n/a	defeated (10) Temple 72–70	eliminated by (2) Villanova 87–68				
7	East	Wisconsin	n/a	defeated (10) Pittsburgh 47–43	defeated (2) Xavier 66–63	eliminated by (6) Notre Dame 56–61			
11	East	Michigan	defeated (11) Tulsa 67–62	eliminated by (6) Notre Dame 63–70					
		W–L (%):	1–0 (1.000)	4–3 (.571)	3–1 (.750)	0–3 (.000)	0–0 (–)	0–0 (–)	0–0 (–) Total: 8–7 (.533)

=== National Invitation tournament ===
Ohio State earned the lone NIT bid for the conference.

Seed	Bracket	School	First round	Second round	Quarterfinals	Semifinals	Finals
3	Monmouth	Ohio State	defeated (6) Akron 72–63 OT	eliminated by (2) Florida 66–74			
		W–L (%):	1–0 (1.000)	0–1 (.000)	0–0 (–)	0–0 (–)	0–0 (–) Total: 1–1 (.500)

=== 2016 NBA draft ===
The following all-conference selections were listed as seniors or graduate students: Yogi Ferrell, Denzel Valentine, Jarrod Uthoff, A. J. Hammons, Bryn Forbes, Shavon Shields, Matt Costello and Brandon Taylor. The following players were invited to the NBA Draft Combine: Robert Carter, Deyonta Davis, Hammons, Jake Layman, Caris LeVert, Diamond Stone, Caleb Swanigan, Melo Trimble, Valentine, Nigel Hayes, and Troy Williams.

With 6 draftees, the Big Ten tied for second along with the Big 12 and SEC, behind the ACC with 9. The following six players were drafted from the Big Ten.

Rnd.	Pick	Player	Pos.	Team	School
1	14	Denzel Valentine	G	Chicago Bulls	Michigan State (Sr.)
1	20	Caris LeVert	SG	Brooklyn Nets (traded to Brooklyn Nets) (Note: June 23, 2016: Indiana Pacers to Brooklyn Nets: Brooklyn acquired Indiana's first round pick and a future second round pick; Indiana acquired Thaddeus Young)	Michigan (Sr.)
2	31	Deyonta Davis	PF/C	Boston Celtics (from Philadelphia via Miami (Note: June 28, 2012: Philadelphia 76ers to Miami Heat, Miami acquired draft rights to Justin Hamilton and a conditional future first round pick (protected top 14 in 2013–2015, else 2015 and 2016 second round picks); Philadelphia acquired draft rights to Arnett Moultrie; January 15, 2014: Miami Heat to Boston Celtics (three-team trade with Golden State Warriors): Boston acquired Joel Anthony, Philadelphia's conditional first round pick, a 2016 second round pick from Miami and cash considerations; Miami acquired Toney Douglas from Golden State; Golden State acquired Jordan Crawford and MarShon Brooks from Boston) traded to Memphis Grizzlies (Note: June 23, 2016: Boston Celtics to Memphis Grizzlies: Memphis acquired draft rights to the No. 31st pick (Davis) and the No. 35th pick (Zagorac); Boston acquired a 2019 first round pick))	Michigan State (Fr.)
2	40	Diamond Stone	PF/C	New Orleans Pelicans (from Sacramento, (Note: July 10, 2013: Sacramento Kings to New Orleans Pelicans (three-team trade with Portland Trail Blazers): Sacramento acquired a 2016 second round pick (with an option to swap with New Orleans' pick) and a 2018 second round pick from Portland; Sacramento acquired Greivis Vásquez from New Orleans; New Orleans acquired Tyreke Evans from Sacramento; New Orleans acquired the draft rights to Jeff Withey from Portland; Portland acquired Robin Lopez and Terrel Harris from New Orleans) (Note: July 10, 2013: New Orleans Pelicans to Sacramento Kings (three-team trade with Portland Trail Blazers): Sacramento acquired a 2016 second round pick (with an option to swap with New Orleans) and a 2018 second round pick from Portland; Sacramento acquired Greivis Vásquez from New Orleans; New Orleans acquired Tyreke Evans from Sacramento; New Orleans acquired the draft rights to Jeff Withey from Portland; Portland acquired Robin Lopez and Terrel Harris from New Orleans; July 13, 2013: Sacramento Kings to Milwaukee Bucks: Sacramento acquired Luc Mbah a Moute; Milwaukee acquired the more favorable 2016 second round pick between Sacramento and New Orleans, the rights to swap 2019 second round picks, and future considerations) traded to Los Angeles Clippers (Note: June 23, 2016: Los Angeles Clippers to New Orleans Pelicans: New Orleans acquired Los Angeles' 2016 second round pick (Diallo); L.A. Clippers acquired the draft rights of New Orleans' 39th (Michineau) and 40th (Stone) picks))	Maryland (Fr.)
2	46	A. J. Hammons	C	Dallas Mavericks	Purdue (Sr.)
2	47	Jake Layman	SF	Orlando Magic (from Chicago, (Note: July 14, 2014: Chicago Bulls to Orlando Magic: Orlando acquired Anthony Randolph, the 2015 second round pick of either Chicago or Denver, and the 2016 second round pick of either Chicago or Portland; Chicago acquired the player rights of Milovan Raković) traded to Portland Trail Blazers (Note: June 23, 2016: Orlando Magic to Portland Trail Blazers: Portland acquired Orlando's 2016 second round pick (Layman); Orlando acquired a 2019 second round pick and cash considerations))	Maryland (Sr.)

==== Pre-draft trades ====
Prior to the day of the draft, the following trades were made and resulted in exchanges of draft picks between the teams.

==== Draft-day trades ====
Draft-day trades occurred on June 23, 2016, the day of the draft.
