= Brandon Taylor (basketball, born August 1994) =

American basketball player (born August 1994)

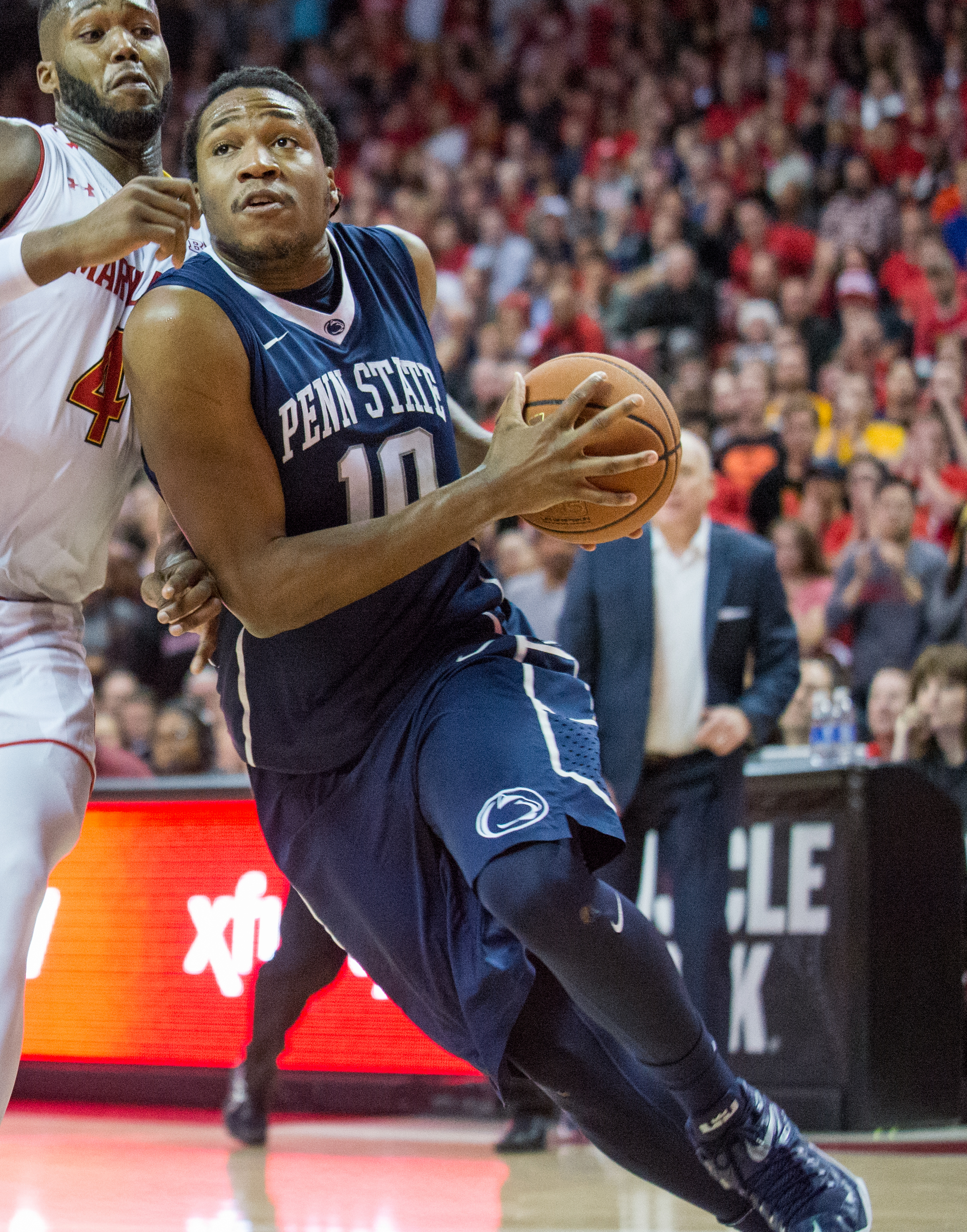

Personal information
- Born: August 1, 1994 (age 32) Willingboro Township, New Jersey, U.S.
- Listed height: 2.01 m (6 ft 7 in)
- Listed weight: 107 kg (236 lb)

Career information
- High school: Trenton Catholic Academy (Hamilton, New Jersey)
- College: Penn State (2012–2016)
- NBA draft: 2016: undrafted
- Playing career: 2016–2019
- Position: Power forward / small forward

Career history
- 2016–2017: PAOK
- 2017: 5 Stelle Massagno
- 2017–2018: Jämtland Basket
- 2018–2019: Vilpas Vikings

Career highlights
- Third-team All-Big Ten (2016)

Brandon Alexander Taylor (born August 1, 1994) is an American former professional basketball player. He is a 6-foot-7-inch (2.01 m) small forward-power forward.

== High school ==
Taylor grew up in Tabernacle Township, New Jersey and played high school basketball at Trenton Catholic Academy, where The Times of Trenton, New Jersey selected him as its 2011–12 boys basketball player of the year.

== College career ==
Taylor played 4 years of NCAA Division I college basketball at Penn State, where he played with the Penn State Lions. In his 4-year college career, he averaged 10.0 points, 5.0 rebounds, 0.8 assists, 0.4 steals, and 0.7 blocks per game, in 26.1 minutes per game, over 129 games played. In his senior season, 2015–16, he averaged 16.3 points, 6.5 rebounds, 1.6 assists, 0.6 steals, and 0.5 blocks per game, in 32.3 minutes per game.

=== College statistics ===
Year	Team	GP	GS	MPG	FG%	3P%	FT%	RPG	APG	SPG	BPG	PPG
2012–13	Penn State	31	18	20.2	.349	.286	.688	3.3	0.3	0.3	0.4	5.3
2013–14	Penn State	34	30	24.9	.395	.322	.877	4.9	0.6	0.1	1.1	9.2
2014–15	Penn State	32	25	26.9	.371	.335	.633	5.3	0.9	0.5	0.8	9.1
2015–16	Penn State	32	32	32.3	.433	.359	.727	6.5	1.6	0.6	0.5	16.3
Career		129	105	26.1	.396	.328	.753	5.0	0.8	0.4	0.7	10.0

== Professional career ==
Taylor began his pro career in Greece in 2016, with the Greek Basket League club PAOK. On January 13, 2017, he parted ways with PAOK, after averaging 2.9 points per game in Greek League, and 4.2 points per contest in Champions League. On February 18, 2017, Taylor signed with the Swiss team 5 Stelle Massagno, of the Swiss League.

On August 7, 2017, Taylor signed with Jämtland Basket of the Basketligan.

== Personal ==
Taylor's cousin, Tiffany Stansbury, was also a professional basketball player, and she played in the WNBA. Taylor's uncle, Terence Stansbury, was also a professional basketball player, and he played in the NBA.
