= Corey Sanders (basketball) =

American basketball player

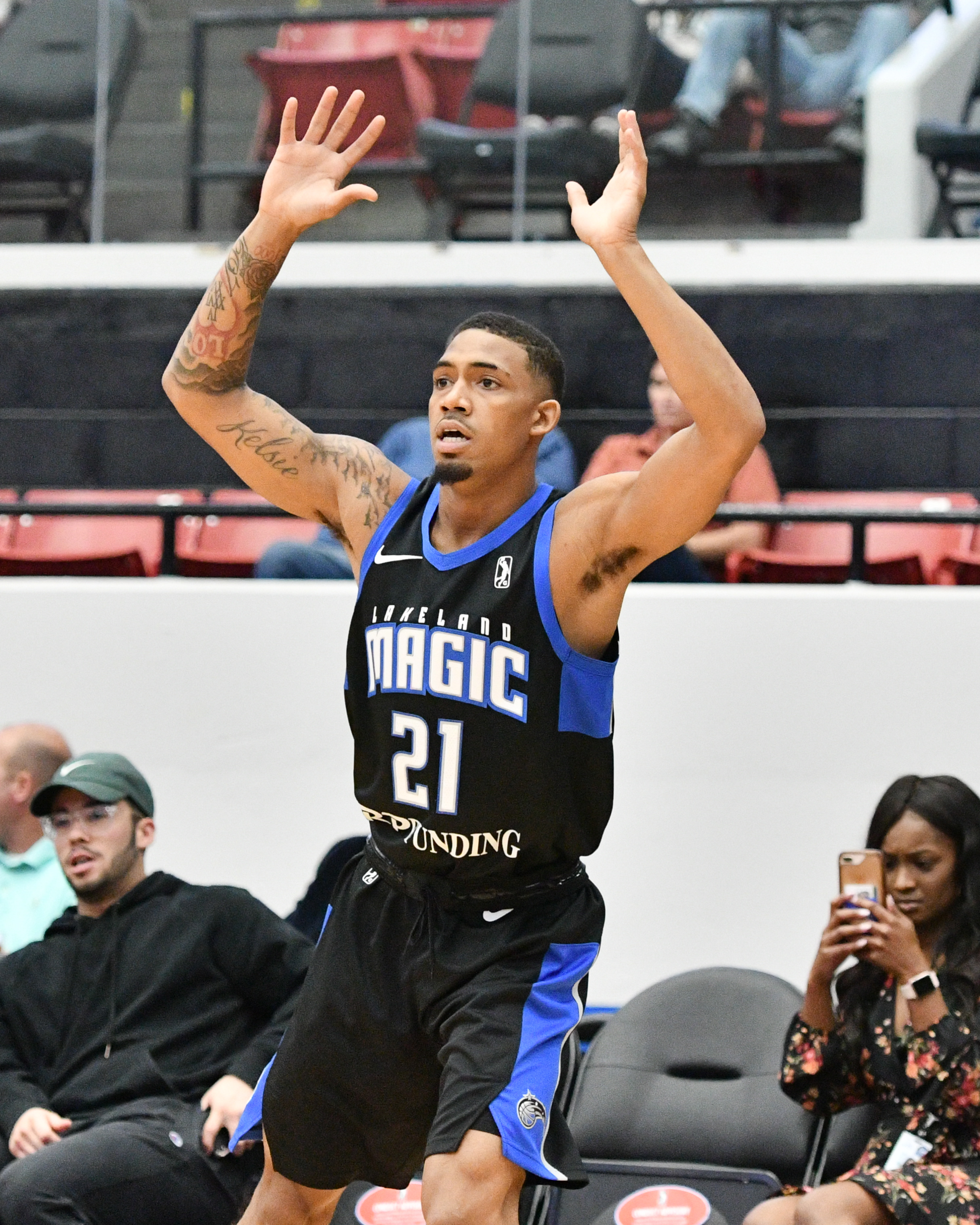
- Sanders with Lakeland Magic

Personal information
- Born: April 17, 1997 (age 29) Lakeland, Florida
- Listed height: 6 ft 4 in (1.93 m)
- Listed weight: 18 lb (8 kg)

Career information
- High school: McKeel Academy (Lakeland, Florida); Kathleen High School (Lakeland, Florida); West Oaks Academy (Orlando, Florida)
- College: Rutgers Scarlet Knights (2015–2018)
- NBA draft: 2018: undrafted
- Position: Point guard

Career history
- 2018–2019: Mega Basket Georgia
- 2019: Lakeland Magic
- 2019–2020: UD Oliveirense
- 2020–2021: Astoria Bydgoszcz
- 2021: Trieste
- 2022: GS Lavrio
- 2022: Hapoel Hevel Modi'in
- 2022: BC Gargždai-SC
- 2022–2023: Sokół Łańcut
- 2024: Astros de Jalisco
- 2025: Pioneros de Los Mochis

Career highlights
- Polish League assists leader (2021); Hugo dos Santos Cup winner (2020); Honorable mention All-Big Ten (2016)

Corey Sanders (born April 17, 1997) is an American professional basketball player for Sokół Łańcut of the Polish Basketball League (PLK). He played college basketball for the Rutgers Scarlet Knights. Following his junior season, Sanders declared for the 2018 NBA draft.

== High school career ==
Sanders began his high school career at McKeel Academy in Lakeland, Florida, playing two seasons. After transferring to George W. Jenkins High School in spring of his second year, he enrolled at IMG Academy in Bradenton, Florida for his junior season. Sanders left IMG in November 2013 for family reasons, transferring to Kathleen High School in Lakeland. Sanders was ruled ineligible for the first half of his junior basketball year, averaging 15.7 points per game for Kathleen in the second half. Sanders initially returned to George Jenkins for his senior season, transferring to Faith Baptist Christian Academy in Georgia in September 2014, and finally to West Oaks Academy in Orlando by November. Sanders led West Oaks to the 2015 Sunshine Independent Athletic Association State Championship.

Sanders was childhood friends with professional basketball player Dwayne Bacon. The two were teammates at McKeel Academy and while playing AAU basketball for the Showtime Ballers.

Sanders was considered a five-star recruit, ranked 60nd in his class of 2015 by ESPN and 73th overall by Rivals.com. Sanders initially committed to the University of Central Florida in fall 2013, but de-committed in October that year. On September 4, 2014, during his senior year, Sanders committed to Rutgers.

== College career ==
Sanders played college basketball for the Rutgers Scarlet Knights, recruited by former NBA player and coach Eddie Jordan. As a freshman, he led the team in scoring with 15.9 points per game. During the year, he was suspended four games for violating team rules. After the firing of Jordan and hiring of Steve Pikiell, Sanders considered transferring or declaring for the NBA draft but remained at Rutgers. As a sophomore, he averaged 12.8 points and 3.2 assists per game, leading all Big Ten sophomores. During his junior year, Sanders averaged 15.2 points per game in the regular season and 24.7 ppg during the Big Ten Tournament. Over three seasons, he averaged of 16.6 points, 3.6 rebounds and 3.5 assists per game. At the conclusion of his junior season, he officially declared for the 2018 NBA draft, forgoing his final season with the Scarlet Knights.

Legend
GP	Games played	GS	Games started	MPG	Minutes per game
FG%	Field goal percentage	3P%	3-point field goal percentage	FT%	Free throw percentage
RPG	Rebounds per game	APG	Assists per game	SPG	Steals per game
BPG	Blocks per game	PPG	Points per game	**Bold**	Career high

=== College statistics ===
Year	Team	GP	GS	MPG	FG%	3P%	FT%	RPG	APG	SPG	BPG	PPG
2015–16	Rutgers	27	24	**33.5**	**.423**	**.315**	**.713**	3.3	**4.3**	**1.8**	.2	**18.9**
2016–17	Rutgers	33	31	30.4	.382	.266	.613	3.2	3.2	1.3	**.5**	14.8
2017–18	Rutgers	**34**	**32**	33.1	.401	.224	.708	**4.3**	3.1	1.3	.3	16.2

== Professional career ==
On October 4, 2018, Sanders signed a deal with the Rio Grande Valley Vipers of the NBA G League He was later waived by the Vipers on November 1, 2018, without playing a game for the franchise.

On January 13, 2019, Sanders signed with the Mega Basket Georgia of the Georgia A League.

On October 3, 2019, Sanders signed with Houston Rockets' G League affiliate, the Rio Grande Valley Vipers of Rio Grande, Texas. G League contracts are one-year deals with a base salary of $7,000 per month or $35,000 over the course of a season, plus incentives. If I player is waived, all G-League teams have 2 years of returning player rights. On November 1, 2019, Sanders was released by the Vipers.

On December 12, 2019, Sanders signed a multi-year deal with NBA G League team Lakeland Magic.

On January 8, 2020, Sanders signed for União Desportiva Oliveirense.

On May 6, 2020, Corey Sanders signed for Astoria Bydgoszcz.

On July 12, 2021, Sanders signed in Italy for Pallacanestro Trieste. He averaged 8.7 points and 4.6 assists per game in nie games.

On January 3, 2022, Sanders moved to Lavrio of the Greek Basket League and the Basketball Champions League. On March 30 of the same year, he was released from the Greek club. In six league games, Sanders averaged 3.7 points, 2.8 assists and 2 rebounds, playing around 18 minutes per contest.

On November 7, 2022, he signed with Sokół Łańcut of the Polish Basketball League (PLK).

== Personal life ==
Sanders lives in Lakeland, Florida, and also has a daughter and son.
