= 2015–16 Ohio State Buckeyes men's basketball team =

American college basketball season

2015–16 Ohio State Buckeyes men's basketball

NIT, Second Round
- Conference: Big Ten Conference
- Record: 21–14 (11–7 Big Ten)
- Head coach: Thad Matta (12th season)
- Assistant coaches: Dave Dickerson; Jeff Boals; Greg Paulus
- Home arena: Value City Arena

2015–16 Big Ten Conference men's basketball standings
	Conf.				Overall
Team	W		L	PCT	W		L	PCT
No. 14 Indiana	15	–	3	.833	27	–	8	.771
No. 2 Michigan State †	13	–	5	.722	29	–	6	.829
No. 18 Maryland	12	–	6	.667	27	–	9	.750
No. 12 Purdue	12	–	6	.667	26	–	9	.743
No. 25 Iowa	12	–	6	.667	22	–	11	.667
Wisconsin	12	–	6	.667	22	–	13	.629
Ohio State	11	–	7	.611	21	–	14	.600
Michigan	10	–	8	.556	23	–	13	.639
Northwestern	8	–	10	.444	20	–	12	.625
Penn State	7	–	11	.389	16	–	16	.500
Nebraska	6	–	12	.333	16	–	18	.471
Illinois	5	–	13	.278	15	–	19	.441
Minnesota	2	–	16	.111	11	–	20	.355
Rutgers	1	–	17	.056	7	–	25	.219
† 2016 Big Ten tournament winner Rankings from AP poll

The 2015–16 Ohio State Buckeyes men's basketball team represented Ohio State University in the 2015–16 NCAA Division I men's basketball season. Their head coach was Thad Matta, in his 12th season with the Buckeyes. They played its home games at Value City Arena in Columbus, Ohio and were members of the Big Ten Conference. They finished the season 21–14, 11–7 in Big Ten play to finish in seventh place. They defeated Penn State in the second round of the Big Ten tournament to advance to the quarterfinals where they lost to Michigan State. They received an invitation to the National Invitational tournament where they defeated Akron in the first round to advance to the second round where they lost to Florida.

== Previous season ==
The Buckeyes finished the 2014–15 season 24–11, 11–7 in Big Ten play to finish in sixth place. They advanced to the quarterfinals of the Big Ten tournament where they lost to Michigan State. They received an at-large bid to the NCAA tournament where they defeated VCU in the second round before losing in the third round to Arizona.

== Departures ==
Name	Number	Pos.	Height	Weight	Year	Hometown	Notes
D'Angelo Russell	0	G	6'5"	180	Freshman	Louisville, KY	Declare for 2015 NBA draft
Shannon Scott	3	G	6'1"	185	Senior	Alpharetta, GA	Graduated
Sam Thompson	12	F	6'7"	200	Senior	Chicago, IL	Graduated
Amir Williams	23	C	6'11"	250	Senior	Birmingham, MI	Graduated
Anthony Lee	31	C	6'9"	230	Senior	Columbia, MD	Graduated
Trey McDonald	55	C	6'8"	240	Senior	Battle Creek, MI	Graduated

== Recruiting Class of 2015 ==
College recruiting information
Name	Hometown	School	Height	Weight	Commit date
JaQuan Lyle; PG	Evansville, IN	IMG Academy	6 ft 5 in (1.96 m)	215 lb (98 kg)	Jan 29, 2015
JaQuan Lyle; PG	Recruit ratings: Scout: Rivals: 247Sports: ESPN:				
Austin Grandstaff; SG	Rockwall, TX	Rockwall High School	6 ft 5 in (1.96 m)	190 lb (86 kg)	May 4, 2015
Austin Grandstaff; SG	Recruit ratings: Scout: Rivals: 247Sports: ESPN:				
Daniel Giddens; C	Marietta, GA	Oak Hill Academy	6 ft 10 in (2.08 m)	240 lb (110 kg)	Jul 4, 2014
Daniel Giddens; C	Recruit ratings: Scout: Rivals: 247Sports: ESPN:				
A. J. Harris; PG	Dayton, OH	Dunbar High School	5 ft 9 in (1.75 m)	150 lb (68 kg)	Aug 12, 2013
A. J. Harris; PG	Recruit ratings: Scout: Rivals: 247Sports: ESPN:				
Mickey Mitchell; SF	Dayton, OH	Plano West High School	6 ft 7 in (2.01 m)	220 lb (100 kg)	Sep 13, 2014
Mickey Mitchell; SF	Recruit ratings: Scout: Rivals: 247Sports: ESPN:				
Overall recruit ranking: Scout: NR Rivals: NR ESPN: NR
Note: In many cases, Scout, Rivals, 247Sports, On3, and ESPN may conflict in their listings of height and weight.; In these cases, the average was taken. ESPN grades are on a 100-point scale.; Sources: "2015 Team Ranking". Rivals.

=== Recruiting Class of 2016 ===
College recruiting information (2016)
Name	Hometown	School	Height	Weight	Commit date
Micah Potter; C	Mentor, OH	Mentor High School	6 ft 10 in (2.08 m)	240 lb (110 kg)	Apr 20, 2015
Micah Potter; C	Recruit ratings: Scout: Rivals: 247Sports: ESPN:				
Derek Funderburk; PF	Lakewood, OH	Saint Edward High School	6 ft 9 in (2.06 m)	210 lb (95 kg)	Apr 1, 2015
Derek Funderburk; PF	Recruit ratings: Scout: Rivals: 247Sports: ESPN:				
Overall recruit ranking: Scout: NR Rivals: NR ESPN: NR
Note: In many cases, Scout, Rivals, 247Sports, On3, and ESPN may conflict in their listings of height and weight.; In these cases, the average was taken. ESPN grades are on a 100-point scale.; Sources: "2016 Team Ranking". Rivals.

== Roster ==
2015–16 Ohio State Buckeyes men's basketball team
Players
Coaches

Pos.	#	Name	Height	Weight	Year	Hometown
F	00	Mickey Mitchell	6 ft 7 in (2.01 m)	232 lb (105 kg)	Fr	Plano, Texas
F	1	Jae'Sean Tate	6 ft 4 in (1.93 m)	230 lb (104 kg)	So	Pickerington, Ohio
F	2	Marc Loving	6 ft 7 in (2.01 m)	215 lb (98 kg)	Jr	Toledo, Ohio
G	3	Austin Grandstaff	6 ft 4 in (1.93 m)	188 lb (85 kg)	Fr	Rockwall, Texas
F/C	4	Daniel Giddens	6 ft 10 in (2.08 m)	228 lb (103 kg)	Fr	Marietta, Georgia
C	10	David Bell	6 ft 10 in (2.08 m)	225 lb (102 kg)	RS Fr	Garfield Heights, Ohio
G	12	A. J. Harris	5 ft 9 in (1.75 m)	157 lb (71 kg)	Fr	Dayton, Ohio
G	13	JaQuan Lyle	6 ft 5 in (1.96 m)	230 lb (104 kg)	Fr	Evansville, Indiana
G	15	Kam Williams	6 ft 2 in (1.88 m)	175 lb (79 kg)	RS So	Baltimore, Maryland
C	32	Trevor Thompson	6 ft 11 in (2.11 m)	210 lb (95 kg)	RS So	Indianapolis, Indiana
F	33	Keita Bates-Diop	6 ft 7 in (2.01 m)	190 lb (86 kg)	So	Bloomington, Illinois
F	34	Jake Lorbach	6 ft 7 in (2.01 m)	210 lb (95 kg)	Sr	Elyria, Ohio

Head coach

- Thad Matta (Butler)

Assistant coach(es)

- Dave Dickerson (Maryland)
- Jeff Boals (Ohio)
- Greg Paulus (Duke)

Legend

- (C) Team captain
- (S) Suspended
- (I) Ineligible
- (W) Walk-on
- Injured
- Current redshirt

Roster

== Schedule ==
Date time, TV	Rank^{#}	Opponent^{#}	Result	Record	Site (attendance) city, state
Exhibition
Nov 8, 2015*; 4:00 pm		Walsh	W 92–82		Value City Arena (12,167); Columbus, OH
Non-conference regular season
Nov 15, 2015*; 12:00 pm, ESPNU		Mount St. Mary's	W 76–54	1–0	Value City Arena (11,590); Columbus, OH
Nov 17, 2015*; 7:00 pm, BTN		Grambling State; Hoophall Miami Invitational	W 82–55	2–0	Value City Arena (10,779); Columbus, OH
Nov 20, 2015*; 7:00 pm, ESPN3		Texas–Arlington; Hoophall Miami Invitational	L 68–73	2–1	Value City Arena (12,312); Columbus, OH
Nov 24, 2015*; 8:00 pm, BTN		Louisiana Tech; Hoophall Miami Invitational	L 74–82	2–2	Value City Arena (11,572); Columbus, OH
Nov 27, 2015*; 7:30 pm, ESPN2		vs. Memphis; Hoophall Miami Invitational	L 76–81 ^{OT}	2–3	American Airlines Arena (10,023); Miami, FL
Dec 1, 2015*; 7:30 pm, ESPN		No. 10 Virginia; ACC–Big Ten Challenge	L 58–64	2–4	Value City Arena (12,445); Columbus, OH
Dec 5, 2015*; 4:30 pm, BTN		VMI	W 89–62	3–4	Value City Arena (12,132); Columbus, OH
Dec 8, 2015*; 8:00 pm, BTN		Air Force	W 74–50	4–4	Value City Arena (11,816); Columbus, OH
Dec 12, 2015*; 12:00 pm, CBS		at UConn	L 55–75	4–5	Gampel Pavilion (10,167); Storrs, CT
Dec 16, 2015*; 7:00 pm, BTN		Northern Illinois	W 67–54	5–5	Value City Arena (12,880); Columbus, OH
Dec 19, 2015*; 3:30 pm, CBS		vs. No. 4 Kentucky; CBS Sports Classic	W 74–67	6–5	Barclays Center (16,311); Brooklyn, NY
Dec 22, 2015*; 9:00 pm, ESPNU		Mercer	W 64–44	7–5	Value City Arena (11,460); Columbus, OH
Dec 27, 2015*; 6:00 pm, BTN		South Carolina State	W 73–57	8–5	Value City Arena (13,506); Columbus, OH
Big Ten regular season
Dec 30, 2015; 7:00 pm, BTN		Minnesota	W 78–63	9–5 (1–0)	Value City Arena (13,701); Columbus, OH
Jan 3, 2016; 5:00 pm, BTN		Illinois	W 75–73	10–5 (2–0)	Value City Arena (12,798); Columbus, OH
Jan 6, 2016; 9:00 pm, BTN		at Northwestern	W 65–56	11–5 (3–0)	Welsh-Ryan Arena (7,439); Evanston, IL
Jan 10, 2016; 1:30 pm, CBS		at Indiana	L 60–85	11–6 (3–1)	Assembly Hall (16,382); Bloomington, IN
Jan 13, 2016; 6:30 pm, BTN		Rutgers	W 94–68	12–6 (4–1)	Value City Arena (11,635); Columbus, OH
Jan 16, 2016; 12:00 pm, ESPN2		at No. 3 Maryland	L 65–100	12–7 (4–2)	Xfinity Center (17,950); College Park, MD
Jan 21, 2016; 9:00 pm, ESPN		at No. 22 Purdue	L 64–75	12–8 (4–3)	Mackey Arena (14,846); West Lafayette, IN
Jan 25, 2016; 7:00 pm, BTN		Penn State	W 66–46	13–8 (5–3)	Value City Arena (11,542); Columbus, OH
Jan 28, 2016; 9:00 pm, BTN		at Illinois	W 68–63 ^{OT}	14–8 (6–3)	State Farm Center (13,263); Champaign, IL
Jan 31, 2016; 1:00 pm, CBS		No. 8 Maryland	L 61–66	14–9 (6–4)	Value City Arena (16,592); Columbus, OH
Feb 4, 2016; 7:00 pm, ESPN		at Wisconsin	L 68–79	14–10 (6–5)	Kohl Center (17,287); Madison, WI
Feb 9, 2016; 8:00 pm, BTN		Northwestern	W 71–63	15–10 (7–5)	Value City Arena (11,376); Columbus, OH
Feb 13, 2016; 4:00 pm, BTN		at Rutgers	W 79–69	16–10 (8–5)	The RAC (5,658); Piscataway, NJ
Feb 16, 2016; 7:00 pm, ESPN		Michigan	W 76–66	17–10 (9–5)	Value City Arena (17,088); Columbus, OH
Feb 20, 2016; 7:00 pm, BTN		at Nebraska	W 65–62 ^{OT}	18–10 (10–5)	Pinnacle Bank Arena (15,679); Lincoln, NE
Feb 23, 2016; 9:00 pm, ESPN		No. 6 Michigan State	L 62–81	18–11 (10–6)	Value City Arena (14,257); Columbus, OH
Feb 28, 2016; 4:00 pm, CBS		No. 8 Iowa	W 68–64	19–11 (11–6)	Value City Arena (15,593); Columbus, OH
Mar 5, 2016; 12:00 pm, ESPN		at No. 2 Michigan State	L 76–91	19–12 (11–7)	Breslin Center (14,797); East Lansing, MI
Big Ten tournament
Mar 10, 2016; 6:30 pm, ESPN2	(7)	vs. (10) Penn State; Second Round	W 79–75	20–12	Bankers Life Fieldhouse (15,751); Indianapolis, IN
Mar 11, 2016; 6:30 pm, BTN	(7)	vs. (2) Michigan State; Quarterfinals	L 54–81	20–13	Bankers Life Fieldhouse (15,942); Indianapolis, IN
NIT
Mar 15, 2016*; 7:00 pm, ESPN	(3)	(6) Akron; First Round – Monmouth Bracket	W 72–63 ^{OT}	21–13	Value City Arena (4,698); Columbus, OH
Mar 20, 2016*; 12:00 pm, ESPN	(3)	(2) Florida; Second Round – Monmouth Bracket	L 66–74	21–14	Value City Arena (8,185); Columbus, OH
*Non-conference game. ^{#}Rankings from AP Poll. (#) Tournament seedings in parentheses. All times are in Eastern Time.

== See also ==
2015–16 Ohio State Buckeyes women's basketball team
