= 2015–16 Northwestern Wildcats men's basketball team =

American college basketball season

2015–16 Northwestern Wildcats men's basketball
- Conference: Big Ten Conference
- Record: 20–12 (8–10 Big Ten)
- Head coach: Chris Collins (3rd season)
- Assistant coaches: Brian James; Patrick Baldwin; Armon Gates
- Home arena: Welsh-Ryan Arena

2015–16 Big Ten Conference men's basketball standings
	Conf.				Overall
Team	W		L	PCT	W		L	PCT
No. 14 Indiana	15	–	3	.833	27	–	8	.771
No. 2 Michigan State †	13	–	5	.722	29	–	6	.829
No. 18 Maryland	12	–	6	.667	27	–	9	.750
No. 12 Purdue	12	–	6	.667	26	–	9	.743
No. 25 Iowa	12	–	6	.667	22	–	11	.667
Wisconsin	12	–	6	.667	22	–	13	.629
Ohio State	11	–	7	.611	21	–	14	.600
Michigan	10	–	8	.556	23	–	13	.639
Northwestern	8	–	10	.444	20	–	12	.625
Penn State	7	–	11	.389	16	–	16	.500
Nebraska	6	–	12	.333	16	–	18	.471
Illinois	5	–	13	.278	15	–	19	.441
Minnesota	2	–	16	.111	11	–	20	.355
Rutgers	1	–	17	.056	7	–	25	.219
† 2016 Big Ten tournament winner Rankings from AP poll

The 2015–16 Northwestern Wildcats men's basketball team represented Northwestern University in the 2015–16 NCAA Division I men's basketball season. They were led by third year head coach Chris Collins. They were members of the Big Ten Conference and played their home games at Welsh-Ryan Arena. They finished the season 20–12, 8–10 in Big Ten play to finish in ninth place. They lost to Michigan in the second round of the Big Ten tournament.

== Previous season ==
The Wildcats finished the 2014–15 Season 15–17, 6–12 in Big Ten play to finish in a tie for 10th place. They lost in the second round of the Big Ten tournament to Indiana.

== Departures ==
Name	Number	Pos.	Height	Weight	Year	Hometown	Notes
Johnnie Vassar	0	G	6'0"	185	Freshman	Chicago, IL	Transferred
Dave Sobolewski	3	G	6'1"	180	Senior	Naperville, IL	Graduated
Nick Segura	21	F	6'6"	183	Freshman	McLean, VA	Transferred
JerShon Cobb	23	G	6'5"	208	RS Senior	Decatur, GA	Graduated
Jeremiah Kreisberg	50	C	6'10"	235	Senior	Berkeley, CA	Graduated

=== Incoming transfers ===
Name	Number	Pos.	Height	Weight	Year	Hometown	Previous School
Joey van Zegeren	1	F	6'10"	235	RS Senior	Hoogeveen, Netherlands	Transferred from Virginia Tech. Under NCAA transfer rules, Van Zegeren will play for the 2015–16 season because he already redshirted a year at Virginia Tech.

== Incoming recruits ==
=== Class of 2015 recruits ===
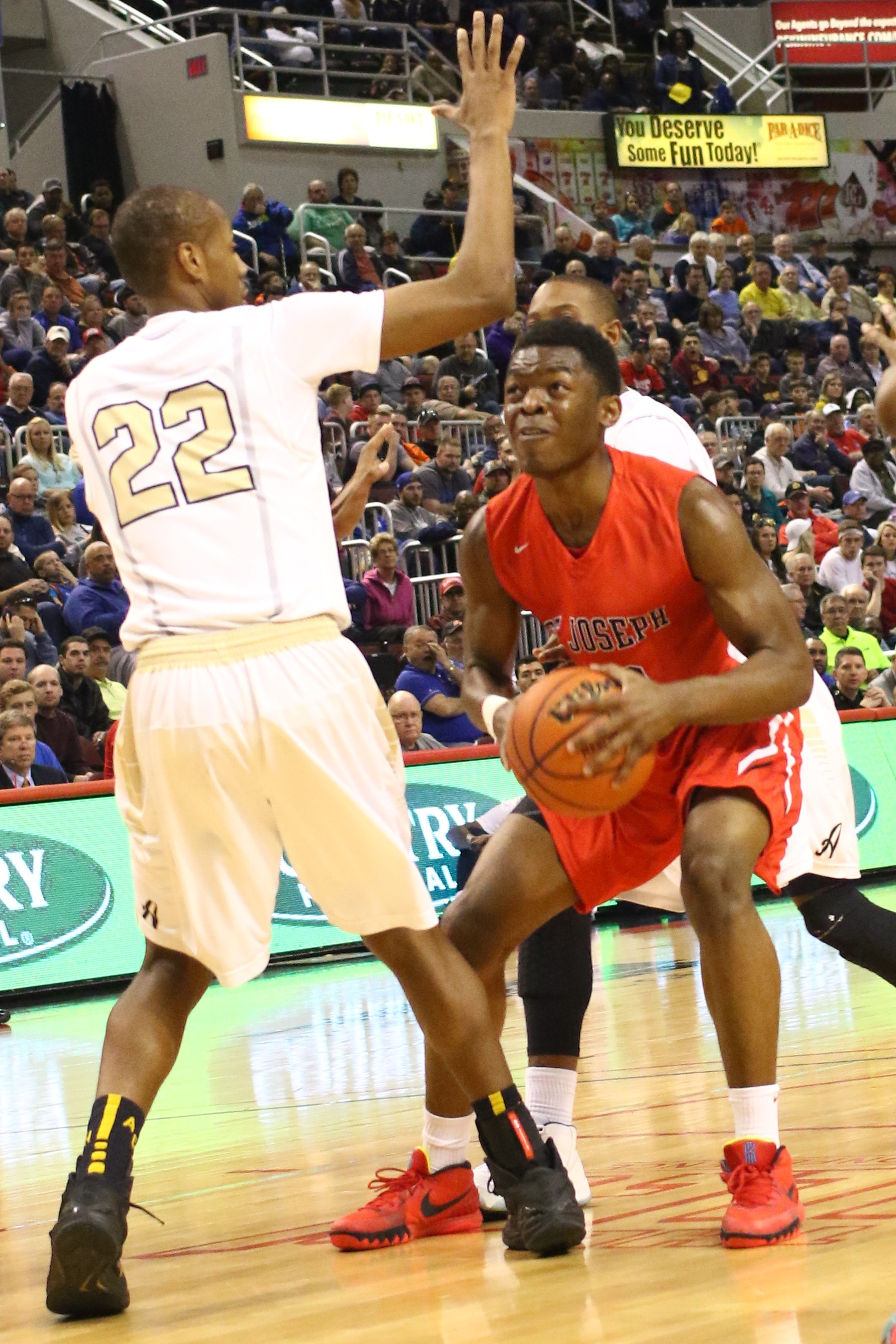
Jordan Ash in the 2015 IHSA 3A championship game victory

College recruiting information
Name	Hometown	School	Height	Weight	Commit date
Aaron Falzon; PF	Newton, MA	Northfield Mount Hermon	6 ft 8 in (2.03 m)	210 lb (95 kg)	Oct 13, 2014
Aaron Falzon; PF	Recruit ratings: Scout: Rivals: 247Sports: (83)				
Dererk Pardon; PF	Cleveland, OH	Villa Angela-St. Joseph High School	6 ft 8 in (2.03 m)	215 lb (98 kg)	Jun 7, 2014
Dererk Pardon; PF	Recruit ratings: Scout: Rivals: 247Sports: (79)				
Jordan Ash; SG	Westchester, IL	Saint Joseph High School	6 ft 2 in (1.88 m)	185 lb (84 kg)	Mar 19, 2014
Jordan Ash; SG	Recruit ratings: Scout: Rivals: 247Sports: (77)				
Overall recruit ranking:
Note: In many cases, Scout, Rivals, 247Sports, On3, and ESPN may conflict in their listings of height and weight.; In these cases, the average was taken. ESPN grades are on a 100-point scale.; Sources: "2015 Team Ranking". Rivals.

== Class of 2016 recruits ==
College recruiting information (2016)
Name	Hometown	School	Height	Weight	Commit date
Rapolas Ivanauskas; SF	Barrington, IL	Barrington	6 ft 8 in (2.03 m)	195 lb (88 kg)	Apr 18, 2015
Rapolas Ivanauskas; SF	Recruit ratings: Scout: Rivals: (N/A)				
Isiah Brown; PG	Lynnwood, WA	Lakeside	5 ft 11 in (1.80 m)	155 lb (70 kg)	May 31, 2015
Isiah Brown; PG	Recruit ratings: Scout: Rivals: (79)				
Overall recruit ranking:
Note: In many cases, Scout, Rivals, 247Sports, On3, and ESPN may conflict in their listings of height and weight.; In these cases, the average was taken. ESPN grades are on a 100-point scale.; Sources: "2016 Team Ranking". Rivals.

== Roster ==
2015–16 Northwestern Wildcats men's basketball team
Players
Coaches

Pos.	#	Name	Height	Weight	Year	Previous school	Hometown
F	1	Joey van Zegeren	6 ft 10 in (2.08 m)	235 lb (107 kg)	RS Sr	Canarias Basketball Academy; Virginia Tech	Hoogeveen, Netherlands
F	4	Vic Law	6 ft 7 in (2.01 m)	185 lb (84 kg)	So	Saint Rita	South Holland, IL
C	5	Dererk Pardon	6 ft 8 in (2.03 m)	235 lb (107 kg)	Fr	Villa Angela-St. Joseph	Cleveland, OH
G	10	Charlie Hall (W)	6 ft 5 in (1.96 m)	200 lb (91 kg)	Fr	Crossroads	Danville, IL
G	14	Tre Demps	6 ft 2 in (1.88 m)	198 lb (90 kg)	RS Sr	Ronald Reagan	San Antonio, TX
G/F	20	Scottie Lindsey	6 ft 5 in (1.96 m)	175 lb (79 kg)	So	Fenwick HS	Hillsdale, IL
C	22	Alex Olah	7 ft 0 in (2.13 m)	270 lb (122 kg)	Sr	Traders Point Christian Acad.	Timișoara, Romania
G	23	Jordan Ash	6 ft 3 in (1.91 m)	185 lb (84 kg)	Fr	St. Joseph	Bolingbrook, IL
G	30	Bryant McIntosh	6 ft 3 in (1.91 m)	177 lb (80 kg)	So	Greensburg Community HS	New Castle, IN
F	32	Nathan Taphorn	6 ft 7 in (2.01 m)	215 lb (98 kg)	Jr	Pekin Community HS	Pekin, IL
G/F	34	Sanjay Lumpkin	6 ft 6 in (1.98 m)	220 lb (100 kg)	RS Jr	Benilde-St. Margaret's	Wayzata, MN
F	35	Aaron Falzon	6 ft 8 in (2.03 m)	205 lb (93 kg)	Fr	Northfield Mount Hermon	Newton, MA
F	44	Gavin Skelly	6 ft 8 in (2.03 m)	219 lb (99 kg)	So	Westlake HS	Westlake, OH

Head coach

- Chris Collins (Duke)

Assistant coach(es)

- Brian James (Illinois State)
- Patrick Baldwin (Northwestern)
- Armon Gates (Kent State)

Legend

- (C) Team captain
- (S) Suspended
- (I) Ineligible
- (W) Walk-on
- Injured
- Current redshirt

Roster
Last update: 2015-07-06

== Schedule and results ==
Date time, TV	Rank^{#}	Opponent^{#}	Result	Record	Site (attendance) city, state
Exhibition
Nov 5, 2015*; 7:00 pm		Quincy (IL)	W 80–64		Welsh-Ryan Arena; Evanston, IL
Non-conference regular season
Nov 13, 2015*; 7:00 pm		UMass Lowell	W 79–57	1–0	Welsh-Ryan Arena (6,011); Evanston, IL
Nov 18, 2015*; 7:00 pm		Fairfield; CBE Hall of Fame Classic	W 79–72	2–0	Welsh-Ryan Arena (5,574); Evanston, IL
Nov 20, 2015*; 7:00 pm, ESPN3		Columbia; CBE Hall of Fame Classic	W 83–80 ^{OT}	3–0	Welsh-Ryan Arena (6,117); Evanston, IL
Nov 23, 2015*; 8:30 pm, ESPN2		vs. No. 9 North Carolina; CBE Hall of Fame Classic semifinals	L 69–80	3–1	Sprint Center (13,598); Kansas City, MO
Nov 24, 2015*; 6:30 pm, ESPN3		vs. Missouri; CBE Hall of Fame Classic 3rd place game	W 67–62	4–1	Sprint Center (13,198); Kansas City, MO
Nov 28, 2015*; 7:00 pm		New Orleans	W 90–63	5–1	Welsh-Ryan Arena (6,015); Evanston, IL
Dec 1, 2015*; 6:00 pm, ESPNU		at Virginia Tech; ACC–Big Ten Challenge	W 81–79 ^{OT}	6–1	Cassell Coliseum (4,879); Blacksburg, VA
Dec 5, 2015*; 2:00 pm		SIU Edwardsville	W 81–56	7–1	Welsh-Ryan Arena (6,318); Evanston, IL
Dec 13, 2015*; 6:00 pm, BTN		Chicago State	W 77–35	8–1	Welsh-Ryan Arena (6,621); Evanston, IL
Dec 15, 2015*; 7:00 pm		Mississippi Valley State	W 78–48	9–1	Welsh-Ryan Arena (5,704); Evanston, IL
Dec 19, 2015*; 1:00 pm, FS1		at DePaul	W 78–70 ^{OT}	10–1	Allstate Arena (6,351); Rosemont, IL
Dec 21, 2015*; 6:00 pm, BTN		Sacred Heart	W 103–67	11–1	Welsh-Ryan Arena (6,574); Evanston, IL
Dec 27, 2015*; 7:00 pm, BTN		Loyola (MD)	W 74–59	12–1	Welsh-Ryan Arena (6,401); Evanston, IL
Big Ten regular season
Dec 30, 2015; 3:00 pm, ESPNU		at Nebraska	W 81–72	13–1 (1–0)	Pinnacle Bank Arena (14,924); Lincoln, NE
Jan 2, 2016; 7:00 pm, BTN		No. 4 Maryland	L 59–72	13–2 (1–1)	Welsh-Ryan Arena (8,117); Evanston, IL
Jan 6, 2016; 8:00 pm, BTN		Ohio State	L 56–65	13–3 (1–2)	Welsh-Ryan Arena (7,439); Evanston, IL
Jan 9, 2016; 1:30 pm, BTN		at Minnesota	W 77–52	14–3 (2–2)	Williams Arena (10,436); Minneapolis, MN
Jan 12, 2016; 6:00 pm, BTN		Wisconsin	W 70–65	15–3 (3–2)	Welsh-Ryan Arena (7,264); Evanston, IL
Jan 16, 2016; 7:30 pm, ESPNU		Penn State	L 62–71	15–4 (3–3)	Welsh-Ryan Arena (7,512); Evanston, IL
Jan 19, 2016; 7:00 pm, BTN		at No. 7 Maryland	L 56–62 ^{OT}	15–5 (3–4)	Xfinity Center (17,144); College Park, MD
Jan 23, 2016; 11:00 am, ESPNU		at No. 25 Indiana	L 57–89	15–6 (3–5)	Assembly Hall (17,472); Bloomington, IN
Jan 28, 2016; 8:00 pm, ESPN		No. 12 Michigan State	L 45–76	15–7 (3–6)	Welsh-Ryan Arena (8,117); Evanston, IL
Jan 31, 2016; 2:00 pm, BTN		at No. 3 Iowa	L 71–85	15–8 (3–7)	Carver–Hawkeye Arena (15,400); Iowa City, IA
Feb 4, 2016; 8:00 pm, BTN		Minnesota	W 84–58	16–8 (4–7)	Welsh-Ryan Arena (7,015); Evanston, IL
Feb 9, 2016; 7:00 pm, BTN		at Ohio State	L 63–71	16–9 (4–8)	Value City Arena (11,376); Columbus, OH
Feb 13, 2016; 7:00 pm, BTN		Illinois	W 58–56	17–9 (5–8)	Welsh-Ryan Arena (8,117); Evanston, IL
Feb 16, 2016; 6:00 pm, BTN		at No. 17 Purdue	L 61–71	17–10 (5–9)	Mackey Arena (12,868); West Lafayette, IN
Feb 24, 2016; 6:00 pm, BTN		at Michigan	L 63–72	17–11 (5–10)	Crisler Center (12,071); Ann Arbor, MI
Feb 27, 2016; 1:00 pm, ESPNU		Rutgers	W 98–59	18–11 (6–10)	Welsh-Ryan Arena (7,833); Evanston, IL
Mar 3, 2016; 8:00 pm, ESPNU		at Penn State	W 71–61	19–11 (7–10)	Bryce Jordan Center (5,936); University Park, PA
Mar 6, 2016; 1:00 pm, BTN		Nebraska	W 65–54	20–11 (8–10)	Welsh-Ryan Arena (7,702); Evanston, IL
Big Ten tournament
Mar 10, 2016; 11:00 am, BTN	(9)	vs. (8) Michigan; Second round	L 70–72 ^{OT}	20–12	Bankers Life Fieldhouse (15,707); Indianapolis, IN
*Non-conference game. ^{#}Rankings from AP Poll. (#) Tournament seedings in parentheses. All times are in Central Time.
