= Terrence Samuel =

American basketball player

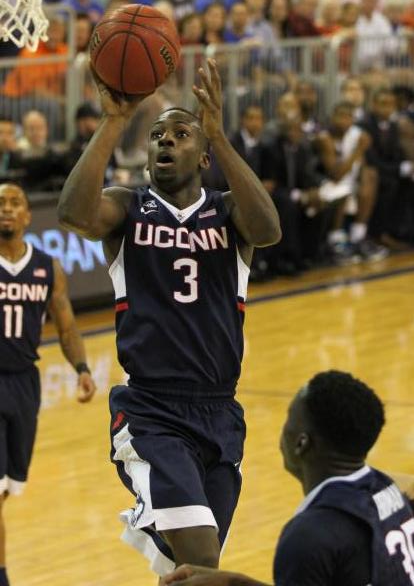
- Samuel shooting for Connecticut in 2015

Personal information
- Born: June 11, 1994 (age 32)
- Listed height: 6 ft 3 in (1.91 m)
- Listed weight: 208 lb (94 kg)

Career information
- High school: Victory Collegiate (Brooklyn, New York)
- College: UConn (2013–2015); Penn State (2016–2017); South Florida (2017–2018)
- NBA draft: 2018: undrafted
- Playing career: 2018–2019
- Position: Shooting guard / point guard

Career highlights
- NCAA champion (2014)

Terrence Hooper Samuel (born June 11, 1994) is an American former basketball player. He transferred from the University of Connecticut. He subsequently transferred to Penn State before transferring to USF for his final season.

Samuel was on the Huskies' 2013–14 NCAA Championship team. Following the 2014–15 season, he announced his transfer, ultimately landing at Penn State.

He graduated from Penn State in 2017 and was granted release from their basketball program. He used his final year of eligibility as a graduate student at USF. He averaged 6.6 points and 4.1 rebounds per game.
