= A. J. Hammons =

American basketball player (born 1992)

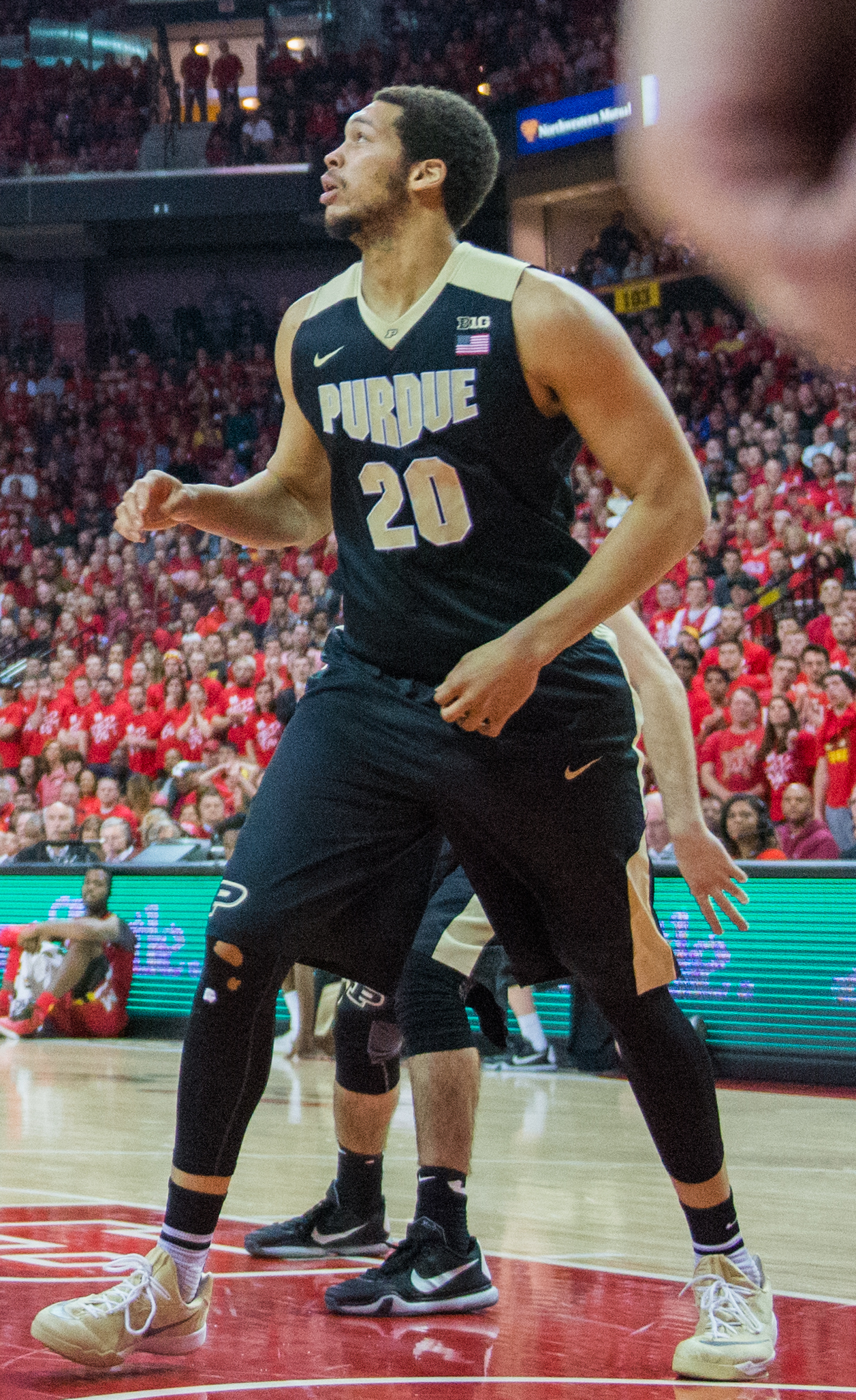

Personal information
- Born: August 27, 1992 (age 34) Gary, Indiana, U.S.
- Listed height: 7 ft 0 in (2.13 m)
- Listed weight: 260 lb (118 kg)

Career information
- High school: Carmel (Carmel, Indiana); Oak Hill (Mouth of Wilson, Virginia)
- College: Purdue (2012–2016)
- NBA draft: 2016: 2nd round, 46th overall pick
- Drafted by: Dallas Mavericks
- Playing career: 2016–2018
- Position: Center

Career history
- 2016–2017: Dallas Mavericks
- 2016–2017: →Texas Legends
- 2017–2018: Sioux Falls Skyforce

Career highlights
- AP Honorable Mention All-American (2016); First-team All-Big Ten (2016); Second-team All-Big Ten (2015); Big Ten Defensive Player of the Year (2016); 3× Big Ten All-Defensive Team (2014–2016); Big Ten All-Freshman Team (2013)
- Stats at NBA.com
- Stats at Basketball Reference

Aaron Jarrell Hammons (born August 27, 1992) is an American former professional basketball player. He played college basketball for the Purdue Boilermakers before being drafted by the Dallas Mavericks with the 46th overall pick in the 2016 NBA draft.

== High school career ==
Hammons first attended Carmel High School in Indiana, where he averaged 8.3 points and 7.8 rebounds as a sophomore, earning honorable mention Associated Press accolades. In his junior season, he transferred to Oak Hill Academy, where as a senior, he averaged 7.0 points, 6.8 rebounds and 4.0 blocks per game.

When he graduated, he was given a four-star rating by Scout.com and by Rivals.com.

== College career ==
Hammons was named to the Big Ten All-Freshman Team at the conclusion of his first season playing for the Purdue Boilermakers, where he averaged 10.6 points, 6.0 rebounds and 2.0 blocks per game. At the conclusion of his sophomore season, Hammons had an average of 10.8 points, 7.4 rebounds and 3.1 blocks per game. He was awarded honorable mention All-Big Ten as well as being named to the Big Ten All-Defensive Team. He was named second-team All-Big Ten as a junior and was again awarded a spot on the Big Ten All-Defensive Team.

In his senior season, Hammons averaged 15.0 points, 8.2 rebounds, 2.5 blocks and 1.1 assists while shooting .592 from the floor. That season, he was named the 2016 Big Ten Defensive Player of the Year, first-team All-Big Ten, and was again named to the Big Ten All-Defensive Team. He was named to the 35-man midseason watchlist for the Naismith Trophy and was named one of the five finalists for the Kareem Abdul-Jabbar Award.

== Professional career ==
=== Dallas Mavericks (2016–2017) ===
On June 23, 2016, Hammons was selected by the Dallas Mavericks with the 46th overall pick in the 2016 NBA draft. On July 8, 2016, he signed with the Mavericks and joined the team for the Las Vegas Summer League. During his rookie season, he had multiple assignments with the Texas Legends of the NBA Development League. He also had three 9-point efforts with the Mavericks during the season, to go with a season-best 7 rebounds on April 7, 2017, against the San Antonio Spurs.

=== Sioux Falls Skyforce (2017–2018) ===
On July 7, 2017, Hammons was traded to the Miami Heat in exchange for Josh McRoberts, a 2023 second-round draft pick, and cash considerations. Hammons was waived by the Heat on February 8, 2018, without appearing in a game for the team, instead spending the majority of his tenure on assignment with the Sioux Falls Skyforce.

== NBA career statistics ==
Legend
GP	Games played	GS	Games started	MPG	Minutes per game
FG%	Field goal percentage	3P%	3-point field goal percentage	FT%	Free throw percentage
RPG	Rebounds per game	APG	Assists per game	SPG	Steals per game
BPG	Blocks per game	PPG	Points per game	**Bold**	Career high

=== Regular season ===
Year	Team	GP	GS	MPG	FG%	3P%	FT%	RPG	APG	SPG	BPG	PPG
2016–17	Dallas	22	0	7.4	.405	.500	.450	1.6	.2	.0	.6	2.2
Career		22	0	7.4	.405	.500	.450	1.6	.2	.0	.6	2.2

== Personal life ==
The son of Tyrone and Alfreda Hammons, he has a brother, Tyrone Jr. He majored in organizational leadership and supervision.
