= Trenton Catholic Academy =

Catholic high school in Mercer County, New Jersey, US

Trenton Catholic Preparatory Academy

Location
- 175 Leonard Avenue; Hamilton Township, (Mercer County), New Jersey 08610; United States
- 40°13′4″N 74°43′7″W

Information
- Type: Private, parochial
- Religious affiliation: Roman Catholic
- Opened: 1962 (opened); 2005 (new name)
- Closed: 2024
- NCES School ID: 00867582
- President: Lauren Brazil
- Faculty: 40.3 FTEs
- Grades: PreK–12
- Gender: Coed
- Enrollment: 399 (as of 2023–24)
- Student to teacher ratio: 9.9:1
- Campus size: 62 acres (250,000 m^{2})
- Colors: Royal blue white
- Slogan: Expect the Exceptional!
- Team name: Iron Mikes / Lady Mikes
- Accreditation: AdvancED
- Tuition: $11,400 (2022-23 for upper school)
- Upper School Director: Charles Kroekel
- Lower School Director: Anne Reap
- Admissions Director: Renee Rogers
- Technology Director: John Russo
- Athletic Director: Giancarlo Riotto; Fred Falchi
- Website: trentoncatholicprep.org

Trenton Catholic Preparatory Academy (formerly Trenton Catholic Academy) was a Catholic school in Trenton, in Mercer County, in the U.S. state of New Jersey. Until its closure in 2024, it served students in pre-kindergarten through twelfth grades and formerly operated under the auspices of the Diocese of Trenton. And operated under an independent board of trustees on and after the 2021-2022 school year.

The school closed after the 2023–24 school year due to the decline in enrollment and financial pressures. An application was submitted to open a charter school on the site that would receive state funding, which was approved as Thrive Charter School.

As of the 2023–24 school year, the school had an enrollment of 399 students and 40.3 classroom teachers (on an FTE basis), for a student–teacher ratio of 9.9:1.

== History ==
Trenton Catholic Academy's high school, i.e., upper school, was known as McCorristin Catholic High School from 1979 to 2005. From its establishment in September 1962 until 1979, the school was known as Saint Anthony High School and affiliated with Saint Anthony Church on Olden Avenue in Hamilton Township. The school was renamed to honor Monsignor Michael "Iron Mike" McCorristin in 1979 and then renamed as Trenton Catholic Academy in 2005 after a series of mergers with other area schools.

The name McCorristin refers to Monsignor Michael "Iron Mike" McCorristin, a Catholic cleric responsible for major parish expansion projects at Holy Angels Church and Saint Anthony Church in Hamilton Township, Mercer County, New Jersey (a suburb of Trenton). The announcement of the closing of Trenton Catholic High School at the end of the 1961–62 school year prompted Monsignor McCorristin to build a new high school to serve the parishes of Trenton and Hamilton Township.

In the wake of a $2 million annual deficit and the impact of COVID-19 on enrollment, the Diocese of Trenton announced in January 2021 that the school was scheduled to close at the end of the 2020-2021 school year. The 550 current TCA students in grades K-12 were to be directed to Notre Dame High School and other nearby schools as alternatives.

The school later reached an agreement with the archdiocese to become an independent Catholic school under the new name of Trenton Catholic Preparatory Academy. Operated under the non-profit of Trenton Catholic Preparatory Academy, Inc.

== Athletics ==
The Trenton Catholic Academy Iron Mikes competed in the Burlington County Scholastic League (BCSL), which is comprised of public and private high schools in Burlington, Mercer and Ocean counties in central New Jersey, and operates under the jurisdiction of the New Jersey State Interscholastic Athletic Association (NJSIAA). With 149 students in grades 10-12, the school was classified by the NJSIAA for the 2019–20 school year as Non-Public B for most athletic competition purposes, which included schools with an enrollment of 37 to 366 students in that grade range (equivalent to Group I for public schools).

The baseball team won the Non-Public A state championship in 1972 (defeating Don Bosco Preparatory High School), 1974 (vs. Saint Joseph Regional High School) and 1975 (vs. Roselle Catholic High School). The 1972 team won the Parochial A title with a 2-0 win against Don Bosco in the championship game for a 16-6 record.

The girls basketball team won the Group II state championship in 1980 (against Union Catholic High School) and won the Non-Public Group B state title in 2007 (vs. St. Anthony High School), 2008 (vs. Marist High School), 2010 (vs. Gill St. Bernard's School) and 2011 (vs. Gill St. Bernard's). The team was declared as the Non-Public South B sectional champion in 2020 after the group finals were cancelled due to COVID-19. The program's five state championships are tied for tenth-most in the state. The 1983 team finished the season with a 27-3 record after taking a 16-point lead at the half against Union Catholic in the Group II championship game and holding on to win by a score of 65-55. The team won the 2006 South B state sectional title, topping Cardinal McCarrick High School 64–53. The team won the South B state sectional championship again in 2007 with a 74–54 win over Sacred Heart High School. The team moved on to win the Group B state championship with a 69–27 win against St. Anthony High School. In 2011, the Trenton Catholic Academy girls' basketball team defeated Neptune High School by a score of 54–49 in the NJSIAA Tournament of Champions final. In doing so, TCA became the first New Jersey high school to capture both a boys (2010) and girls (2011) TOC title.

The boys basketball team won the Non-Public Group A state championship in 1982 (against runner-up Seton Hall Preparatory School in the playoff finals), 1989 (vs. Bergen Catholic High School) and 1990 (vs. Seton Hall), and won the Non-Public B title in 2010 (vs. Saint Anthony High School). The 2010 team won the program's first state title in two decades with a 57–56 win in triple overtime in the Non-Public B championship game at the Ritacco Center against Saint Anthony, a team that had won all 18 of its previous final appearances starting in 1980. Trenton Catholic became the first Mercer County team to win the NJSIAA Tournament of Champions, coming in as the second seed and winning against number-three seed University High School by 63–46 in the semifinals and won vs. top-seeded Camden Catholic High School in the championship game at the Izod Center by a score of 53–39 to finish the season with a 28–3 record.

The softball team won the Non-Public Group B state championship in 1983, defeating DePaul Catholic High School in the tournament final.

The 2008-09 Trenton Catholic Lower School girls' basketball team finished the season with a 26–1 record, won the Mercer County CYO Championship, and was runner-up in the Tournament of Champions.

At the high school level, the Iron Mikes have added other sports to the list such as Cross Country, Winter and Outdoor Track for the 2008-09 year.

== Notable alumni ==
- Zoe Brooks (born 2005, transferred), college basketball player for the NC State Wolfpack
- Charles Cooke (born 1994, class of 2012), NBA basketball player for the New Orleans Pelicans
- Brian Duperreault (born 1947, class of 1965), executive in the insurance industry who is the CEO of American International Group
- Billy Gazonas (born c. 1955, class of 1973), soccer midfielder who won the 1977 Hermann Trophy as the top collegiate soccer player of the year, and played in both the North American Soccer League and Major Indoor Soccer League. In 1999, he was named by The Star-Ledger as one of the top ten New Jersey high school soccer players of the 1970s
- Nola Henry (born 1994, transferred), professional basketball coach who is an assistant coach for the Dallas Wings of the WNBA
- Brandel Littlejohn, professional wrestler who competes for Ring of Honor, where he performs under the ring name "World Famous CB"
- Frantz Massenat (born 1992, class of 2010), professional basketball player who played for the Drexel Dragons
- Myles Powell (born 1997, transferred), basketball player for the Seton Hall Pirates men's basketball team
- Malachi Richardson (born 1996, class of 2015), professional basketball player for the Toronto Raptors
- Thomas Sorber (born 2005, transferred), college basketball player for the Georgetown Hoyas
- La'Keisha Sutton (born 1990, class of 2008), professional basketball player for the Harlem Globetrotters
- Brandon Taylor (born 1994, class of 2012), professional basketball player for Jämtland Basket of the Basketligan
- Jamir Watkins (born 2001, class of 2020), basketball player
