= 2015–16 Iowa Hawkeyes men's basketball team =

American college basketball season

2015–16 Iowa Hawkeyes men's basketball

NCAA tournament, Second Round
- Conference: Big Ten Conference

Ranking
- Coaches: No. 25
- AP: No. 25
- Record: 22–11 (12–6 Big Ten)
- Head coach: Fran McCaffery (6th season)
- Assistant coaches: Sherman Dillard; Andrew Francis; Kirk Speraw
- Home arena: Carver–Hawkeye Arena (Capacity: 15,400)

2015–16 Big Ten Conference men's basketball standings
	Conf.				Overall
Team	W		L	PCT	W		L	PCT
No. 14 Indiana	15	–	3	.833	27	–	8	.771
No. 2 Michigan State †	13	–	5	.722	29	–	6	.829
No. 18 Maryland	12	–	6	.667	27	–	9	.750
No. 12 Purdue	12	–	6	.667	26	–	9	.743
No. 25 Iowa	12	–	6	.667	22	–	11	.667
Wisconsin	12	–	6	.667	22	–	13	.629
Ohio State	11	–	7	.611	21	–	14	.600
Michigan	10	–	8	.556	23	–	13	.639
Northwestern	8	–	10	.444	20	–	12	.625
Penn State	7	–	11	.389	16	–	16	.500
Nebraska	6	–	12	.333	16	–	18	.471
Illinois	5	–	13	.278	15	–	19	.441
Minnesota	2	–	16	.111	11	–	20	.355
Rutgers	1	–	17	.056	7	–	25	.219
† 2016 Big Ten tournament winner Rankings from AP poll

The 2015–16 Iowa Hawkeyes men's basketball team represented the University of Iowa as members of the Big Ten Conference during the 2015–16 NCAA Division I men's basketball season. The team was led by sixth-year head coach Fran McCaffery and played their home games at Carver–Hawkeye Arena. They finished the season 22–11, 12–6 record in Big Ten play to finish in a four-way tie for third place. In the Big Ten tournament, they were upset by Illinois in the second round. They received an at-large bid to the NCAA tournament, where they defeated Temple in the first round before losing to eventual National Champion Villanova in the second round.

== Previous season ==
The Hawkeyes finished the 2014–15 season with a 22–12 record, 12–6 in conference play, finishing in third place. They lost to Penn State in the second round of the Big Ten tournament and received an at-large bid to the NCAA tournament, where they defeated Davidson in the First Round and lost to Gonzaga in the Third Round.

== Offseason ==
=== Departures ===
Name	Number	Pos.	Height	Weight	Year	Hometown	Reason for departure
Gabriel Olaseni	0	C	6'10"	237	Senior	London, England	Graduated
Josh Oglesby	2	G	6'5"	200	Senior	Cedar Rapids, IA	Graduated
Trey Dickerson	11	G	6'1"	180	Sophomore	Queens, NY	Transferred to South Dakota
Kyle Denning	13	G	6'1"	165	Senior	Cedar Rapids, IA	Graduated
Aaron White	30	F	6'9"	228	Senior	Strongsville, OH	Graduated/2015 NBA draft

=== Incoming transfers ===
Name	Pos.	Height	Weight	Year	Hometown	Notes
Dale Jones	SF	6'8"	220	Junior	Waterloo, IA	Junior college transfer from Tyler JC

=== 2015 recruiting class ===
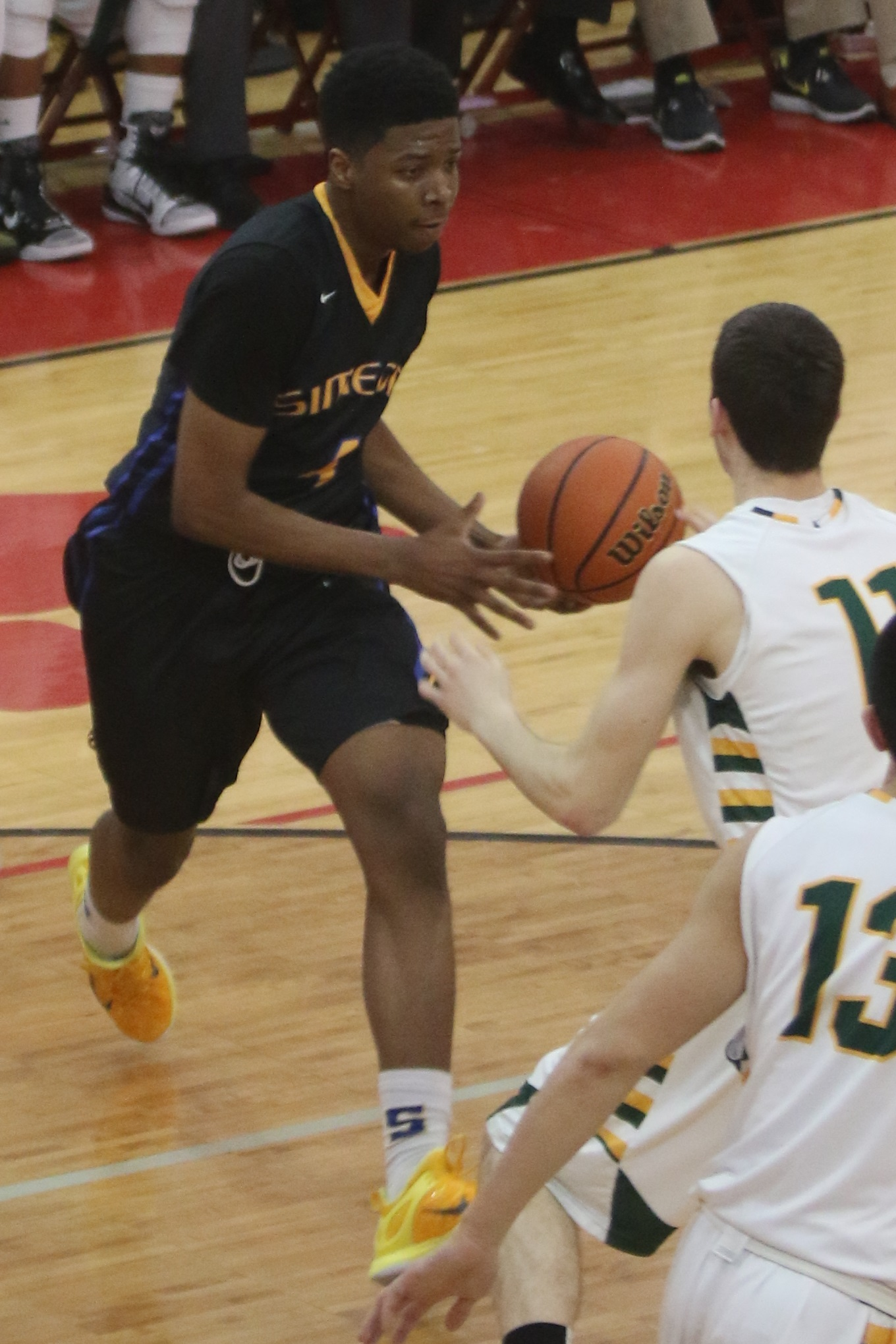
Isaiah Moss in a game against 2015 IHSA 4A state champion Stevenson.

College recruiting
Name	Hometown	School	Height	Weight	Commit date
Isaiah Moss; SF	Chicago, IL	Simeon Career Academy	6 ft 5 in (1.96 m)	175 lb (79 kg)	Nov 2, 2014
Isaiah Moss; SF	Recruit ratings: Scout: Rivals: 247Sports: ESPN:				
Brandon Hutton; SF	Chicago, IL	De La Salle Institute	6 ft 6 in (1.98 m)	205 lb (93 kg)	Mar 9, 2014
Brandon Hutton; SF	Recruit ratings: Scout: Rivals: 247Sports: ESPN:				
Ahmad Wagner; PF	Huber Heights, OH	Wayne High School	6 ft 7 in (2.01 m)	215 lb (98 kg)	Aug 10, 2014
Ahmad Wagner; PF	Recruit ratings: Scout: Rivals: 247Sports: ESPN:				
Andrew Fleming; SG	Nashville, TN	Oak Hill Academy	6 ft 5 in (1.96 m)	205 lb (93 kg)	May 12, 2014
Andrew Fleming; SG	Recruit ratings: Scout: Rivals: 247Sports: ESPN:				
Christian Williams; SG	Decatur, IL	Saint Teresa High School	6 ft 6 in (1.98 m)	180 lb (82 kg)	Mar 16, 2015
Christian Williams; SG	Recruit ratings: Scout: Rivals: 247Sports: ESPN:				
Overall recruit ranking:
Note: In many cases, Scout, Rivals, 247Sports, On3, and ESPN may conflict in their listings of height and weight.; In these cases, the average was taken. ESPN grades are on a 100-point scale.; Sources: "ESPN- Iowa Hawkeyes Men's Basketball Recruiting". ESPN.; "2015 Team Ranking". Rivals.

=== 2016 recruiting class ===
College recruiting (2016)
Name	Hometown	School	Height	Weight	Commit date
Jordan Bohannon; PG	Marion, IA	Linn-Mar High School	6 ft 0 in (1.83 m)	170 lb (77 kg)	Aug 28, 2015
Jordan Bohannon; PG	Recruit ratings: Scout: Rivals: 247Sports: ESPN:				
Tyler Cook; PF	St. Louis, MO	Chaminade College Prep School	6 ft 8 in (2.03 m)	240 lb (110 kg)	Sep 23, 2015
Tyler Cook; PF	Recruit ratings: Scout: Rivals: 247Sports: ESPN:				
Ryan Kriener; PF	Spirit Lake, IA	Spirit Lake High School	6 ft 8 in (2.03 m)	230 lb (100 kg)	Jul 30, 2015
Ryan Kriener; PF	Recruit ratings: Scout: Rivals: 247Sports: ESPN:				
Cordell Pemsl; SF	Dubuque, IA	Wahlert Catholic High School	6 ft 7 in (2.01 m)	230 lb (100 kg)	May 1, 2014
Cordell Pemsl; SF	Recruit ratings: Scout: Rivals: 247Sports: ESPN:				
Overall recruit ranking:
Note: In many cases, Scout, Rivals, 247Sports, On3, and ESPN may conflict in their listings of height and weight.; In these cases, the average was taken. ESPN grades are on a 100-point scale.; Sources: "ESPN- Iowa Hawkeyes Men's Basketball Recruiting". ESPN.; "2016 Team Ranking". Rivals.

== Roster ==
2015–16 Iowa Hawkeyes men's basketball team
Players
Coaches

Pos.	#	Name	Height	Weight	Year	Hometown
F	0	Ahmad Wagner	6 ft 7 in (2.01 m)	225 lb (102 kg)	Fr	Yellow Springs, OH
F	1	Dale Jones (injured)	6 ft 8 in (2.03 m)	220 lb (100 kg)	Jr	Waterloo, IA
G	2	Andrew Fleming	6 ft 5 in (1.96 m)	206 lb (93 kg)	Fr	Nashville, TN
G	3	Michael Soukup (W)	6 ft 4 in (1.93 m)	175 lb (79 kg)	Jr	Danville, IA
G	4	Isaiah Moss (redshirt)	6 ft 5 in (1.96 m)	200 lb (91 kg)	Fr	Chicago, IL
G	5	Anthony Clemmons (C)	6 ft 2 in (1.88 m)	200 lb (91 kg)	Sr	Lansing, MI
G	10	Mike Gesell (C)	6 ft 2 in (1.88 m)	190 lb (86 kg)	Sr	South Sioux City, NE
G	11	Christian Williams	6 ft 6 in (1.98 m)	200 lb (91 kg)	Fr	Decatur, IL
G	13	Steven Soukup (W)	6 ft 4 in (1.93 m)	175 lb (79 kg)	Jr	Danville, IA
G	14	Peter Jok	6 ft 6 in (1.98 m)	205 lb (93 kg)	Jr	Des Moines, IA
F	20	Jarrod Uthoff (C)	6 ft 9 in (2.06 m)	221 lb (100 kg)	Sr	Cedar Rapids, IA
F	23	Okey Ukah (W)	6 ft 7 in (2.01 m)	218 lb (99 kg)	Sr	Iowa City, IA
G	24	Brady Ellingson	6 ft 4 in (1.93 m)	190 lb (86 kg)	RS Fr	Sussex, WI
F	25	Dom Uhl	6 ft 8 in (2.03 m)	195 lb (88 kg)	So	Frankfurt, Germany
F	30	Brandon Hutton (redshirt)	6 ft 6 in (1.98 m)	215 lb (98 kg)	Fr	Chicago, IL
C	34	Adam Woodbury (C)	7 ft 1 in (2.16 m)	250 lb (113 kg)	Sr	Sioux City, IA
F	51	Nicholas Baer (W)	6 ft 7 in (2.01 m)	200 lb (91 kg)	RS Fr	Bettendorf, IA

Head coach

- Fran McCaffery (Penn)

Assistant coach(es)

- Sherman Dillard (James Madison)
- Andrew Francis (Southampton)
- Kirk Speraw (Iowa)

Athletic trainer(s)

- Brad Floy (Iowa)

Legend

- (C) Team captain
- (S) Suspended
- (I) Ineligible
- (W) Walk-on
- Injured
- Current redshirt

Roster

== Schedule and results ==
Date time, TV	Rank^{#}	Opponent^{#}	Result	Record	High points	High rebounds	High assists	Site (attendance) city, state
Exhibition
Oct 29, 2015*; 7:00 pm		Sioux Falls	W 99–73		–	–	–	Carver–Hawkeye Arena (11,381); Iowa City, IA
Nov 6, 2015*; 7:00 pm		Augustana (SD)	L 74–76		–	–	–	Carver–Hawkeye Arena (14,209); Iowa City, IA
Non-conference regular season
Nov 13, 2015*; 8:30 pm, ESPN3		Gardner–Webb	W 79–59	1–0	21 – Uthoff	8 – Wagner	9 – Gesell	Carver–Hawkeye Arena (14,209); Iowa City, IA
Nov 15, 2015*; 4:00 pm, BTN		Coppin State	W 103–68	2–0	20 – Ellingson	7 – Tied	12 – Gesell	Carver–Hawkeye Arena (12,350); Iowa City, IA
Nov 19, 2015*; 8:00 pm, FS1		at Marquette; Gavitt Tipoff Games	W 89–61	3–0	20 – Jok	7 – Woodbury	7 – Clemmons	BMO Harris Bradley Center (13,297); Milwaukee, WI
Nov 26, 2015*; 8:00 pm, ESPN2		vs. Dayton; AdvoCare Invitational First Round	L 77–82	3–1	18 – Uthoff	8 – Woodbury	6 – Clemmons	HP Field House (4,871); Lake Buena Vista, FL
Nov 27, 2015*; 6:00 pm, ESPN3		vs. No. 17 Notre Dame; AdvoCare Invitational Consolation 2nd Round	L 62–68	3–2	20 – Uthoff	10 – Woodbury	9 – Gesell	HP Field House; Lake Buena Vista, FL
Nov 29, 2015*; 10:00 am, ESPN3		vs. No. 20 Wichita State; AdvoCare Invitational 7th Place Game	W 84–62	4–2	22 – Uthoff	7 – Tied	9 – Gesell	HP Field House; Lake Buena Vista, FL
Dec 2, 2015*; 8:15 pm, ESPNU		Florida State; ACC–Big Ten Challenge	W 78–75 ^{OT}	5–2	24 – Jok	10 – Woodbury	4 – Clemmons	Carver–Hawkeye Arena (11,247); Iowa City, IA
Dec 5, 2015*; 2:00 pm, ESPN3		UMKC	W 95–75	6–2	14 – Tied	10 – Uhl	6 – Tied	Carver–Hawkeye Arena (11,763); Iowa City, IA
Dec 7, 2015*; 6:00 pm, BTN		Western Illinois	W 90–56	7–2	27 – Uthoff	9 – Uthoff	7 – Gesell	Carver–Hawkeye Arena (11,395); Iowa City, IA
Dec 10, 2015*; 6:30 pm, ESPN2		at No. 5 Iowa State; Iowa Corn Cy-Hawk Series	L 82–83	7–3	32 – Uthoff	9 – Uthoff	8 – Gesell	Hilton Coliseum (14,384); Ames, IA
Dec 19, 2015*; 3:30 pm, ESPN3		vs. Drake; Big Four Classic	W 70–64	8–3	17 – Gesell	8 – Uhl	4 – Gesell	Wells Fargo Arena (15,424); Des Moines, IA
Dec 22, 2015*; 7:30 pm, ESPN3		Tennessee Tech	W 85–63	9–3	21 – Jok	7 – Uhl	10 – Gesell	Carver–Hawkeye Arena (14,432); Iowa City, IA
Big Ten regular season
Dec 29, 2015; 8:00 pm, BTN		No. 1 Michigan State	W 83–70	10–3 (1–0)	25 – Gesell	5 – Tied	5 – Clemmons	Carver–Hawkeye Arena (15,400); Iowa City, IA
Jan 2, 2016; 5:00 pm, BTN		at No. 14 Purdue	W 70–63	11–3 (2–0)	25 – Uthoff	9 – Jok	7 – Gesell	Mackey Arena (14,846); West Lafayette, IN
Jan 5, 2016; 8:00 pm, BTN	No. 19	Nebraska	W 77–66	12–3 (3–0)	25 – Uthoff	8 – Tied	10 – Gesell	Carver–Hawkeye Arena (11,736); Iowa City, IA
Jan 14, 2016; 6:00 pm, ESPN	No. 16	at No. 4 Michigan State	W 76–59	13–3 (4–0)	23 – Jok	10 – Uthoff	6 – Gesell	Breslin Center (14,797); East Lansing, MI
Jan 17, 2016; 3:30 pm, BTN	No. 16	Michigan	W 82–71	14–3 (5–0)	23 – Uthoff	6 – Woodbury	7 – Gesell	Carver–Hawkeye Arena (15,400); Iowa City, IA
Jan 21, 2016; 6:00 pm, ESPNU	No. 9	at Rutgers	W 90–76	15–3 (6–0)	29 – Jok	11 – Woodbury	9 – Gesell	The RAC (4,209); Piscataway, NJ
Jan 24, 2016; 12:00 pm, BTN	No. 9	No. 22 Purdue	W 83–71	16–3 (7–0)	22 – Uthoff	10 – Woodbury	6 – Clemmons	Carver–Hawkeye Arena (15,400); Iowa City, IA
Jan 28, 2016; 6:00 pm, ESPN	No. 3	at No. 8 Maryland	L 68–74	16–4 (7–1)	14 – Jok	10 – Tied	4 – Clemmons	Xfinity Center (17,950); College Park, MD
Jan 31, 2016; 2:00 pm, BTN	No. 3	Northwestern	W 85–71	17–4 (8–1)	26 – Jok	9 – Woodbury	4 – Gesell	Carver–Hawkeye Arena (15,400); Iowa City, IA
Feb 3, 2016; 6:00 pm, ESPNU	No. 5	Penn State	W 73–49	18–4 (9–1)	14 – Uthoff	15 – Woodbury	4 – Clemmons	Carver–Hawkeye Arena (12,596); Iowa City, IA
Feb 7, 2016; 12:00 pm, BTN	No. 5	at Illinois	W 77–65	19–4 (10–1)	23 – Jok	14 – Woodbury	4 – Woodbury	State Farm Center (13,849); Champaign, IL
Feb 11, 2016; 8:00 pm, ESPN	No. 4	at Indiana	L 78–85	19–5 (10–2)	24 – Uthoff	15 – Woodbury	6 – Gesell	Assembly Hall (17,472); Bloomington, IN
Feb 14, 2016; 6:30 pm, BTN	No. 4	Minnesota	W 75–71	20–5 (11–2)	27 – Jok	15 – Uthoff	12 – Gesell	Carver–Hawkeye Arena (15,400); Iowa City, IA
Feb 17, 2016; 5:30 pm, BTN	No. 4	at Penn State	L 75–79	20–6 (11–3)	28 – Jok	10 – Woodbury	4 – Tied	Bryce Jordan Center (6,590); University Park, PA
Feb 24, 2016; 8:00 pm, BTN	No. 8	Wisconsin	L 59–67	20–7 (11–4)	21 – Jok	18 – Woodbury	3 – Gesell	Carver–Hawkeye Arena (15,400); Iowa City, IA
Feb 28, 2016; 3:00 pm, CBS	No. 8	at Ohio State	L 64–68	20–8 (11–5)	16 – Tied	9 – Woodbury	5 – Gesell	Value City Arena (15,593); Columbus, OH
Mar 1, 2016; 8:00 pm, ESPN	No. 16	No. 12 Indiana	L 78–81	20–9 (11–6)	18 – Uthoff	11 – Woodbury	6 – Gesell	Carver–Hawkeye Arena (15,400); Iowa City, IA
Mar 5, 2016; 7:00 pm, BTN	No. 16	at Michigan	W 71–61	21–9 (12–6)	29 – Uthoff	11 – Woodbury	11 – Gesell	Crisler Arena (12,707); Ann Arbor, MI
Big Ten tournament
Mar 10, 2016; 1:30 pm, BTN	(5) No. 20	vs. (12) Illinois; Second round	L 66–68	21–10	29 – Jok	10 – Woodbury	8 – Gesell	Bankers Life Fieldhouse (15,707); Indianapolis, IN
NCAA tournament
Mar 18, 2016*; 2:10 pm, truTV	(7 S) No. 25	vs. (10 S) Temple; First Round	W 72–70 ^{OT}	22–10	23 – Uthoff	7 – Jok	6 – Clemmons	Barclays Center (17,333); Brooklyn, NY
Mar 20, 2016*; 11:10 am, CBS	(7 S) No. 25	vs. (2 S) No. 6 Villanova; Second Round	L 68–87	22–11	16 – Uthoff	6 – Tied	9 – Gesell	Barclays Center (17,401); Brooklyn, NY
*Non-conference game. ^{#}Rankings from AP Poll. (#) Tournament seedings in parentheses. S=South Region. All times are in Central Time.

== Rankings ==
Ranking movement Legend: ██ Increase in ranking. ██ Decrease in ranking.
Poll	Pre	Wk 2	Wk 3	Wk 4	Wk 5	Wk 6	Wk 7	Wk 8	Wk 9	Wk 10	Wk 11	Wk 12	Wk 13	Wk 14	Wk 15	Wk 16	Wk 17	Wk 18	Wk 19	Final
AP	RV	RV	RV	RV	RV	RV	RV	RV	19	16	9	3	5	4 (11)	4	8	16	20	25	N/A*
Coaches	RV	NR	RV	RV	RV	RV	RV	NR	23	19	9	4	7	5 (3)	6	8	15	18	24	25

*AP does not release post-NCAA tournament rankings.

== See also ==
- 2015–16 Iowa Hawkeyes women's basketball team
