= 2016 Big Ten men's basketball tournament =

- Classification: Division I
- Season: 2015–16
- Teams: 14
- Site: Bankers Life Fieldhouse; Indianapolis, Indiana
- Champions: Michigan State (5th title)
- Winning coach: Tom Izzo (5th title)
- MVP: Denzel Valentine (Michigan State)
- Attendance: 117,051
- Television: BTN, ESPN/2, CBS

2015–16 Big Ten Conference men's basketball standings
	Conf.				Overall
Team	W		L	PCT	W		L	PCT
No. 14 Indiana	15	–	3	.833	27	–	8	.771
No. 2 Michigan State †	13	–	5	.722	29	–	6	.829
No. 18 Maryland	12	–	6	.667	27	–	9	.750
No. 12 Purdue	12	–	6	.667	26	–	9	.743
No. 25 Iowa	12	–	6	.667	22	–	11	.667
Wisconsin	12	–	6	.667	22	–	13	.629
Ohio State	11	–	7	.611	21	–	14	.600
Michigan	10	–	8	.556	23	–	13	.639
Northwestern	8	–	10	.444	20	–	12	.625
Penn State	7	–	11	.389	16	–	16	.500
Nebraska	6	–	12	.333	16	–	18	.471
Illinois	5	–	13	.278	15	–	19	.441
Minnesota	2	–	16	.111	11	–	20	.355
Rutgers	1	–	17	.056	7	–	25	.219
† 2016 Big Ten tournament winner Rankings from AP poll

The 2016 Big Ten men's basketball tournament was the postseason men's basketball tournament for the Big Ten Conference held from March 9 through March 13 at Bankers Life Fieldhouse in Indianapolis, Indiana. It was the nineteenth annual Big Ten men's basketball tournament and was the second tournament to feature 14 teams of the expanded Big Ten, including Maryland and Rutgers. The championship was won by Michigan State who defeated Purdue in the championship game. As a result, Michigan State received the conference's automatic bid to the NCAA tournament. The win marked Michigan State's fifth tournament championship, the most tournament championships by any team in the Big Ten (Ohio State has won five championships as well, but one has been vacated). It was Michigan State's third straight appearance in the championship game and their fourth appearance in the championship in the prior five years. Denzel Valentine was named the Tournament's Most Outstanding Player.

== Seeds ==
All 14 Big Ten schools participated in the tournament. Teams were seeded by conference record, with a tiebreaker system used to seed teams with identical conference records. Seeding for the tournament was determined at the close of the regular conference season. The top 10 teams received a first round bye and the top four teams received a double bye. Tiebreaking procedures were unchanged from the 2015 tournament.

Seed	School	Conf.	Tiebreaker 1	Tiebreaker 2	Tiebreaker 3	Tiebreaker 4
1	Indiana	15–3				
2	Michigan State	13–5				
3	Maryland	12–6	3–2 vs Pur, Iowa, Wis			
4	Purdue	12–6	3–3 vs MD, Iowa, Wis	0–1 vs Ind	1–0 vs MSU	1–0 vs OSU
5	Iowa	12–6	2–2 vs MD, Pur, Wis	0–2 vs Ind	2–0 vs MSU	0–1 vs OSU
6	Wisconsin	12–6	2–3 vs MD, Pur, Iowa			
7	Ohio State	11–7				
8	Michigan	10–8				
9	Northwestern	8–10				
10	Penn State	7–11				
11	Nebraska	6–12				
12	Illinois	5–13				
13	Minnesota	2–16				
14	Rutgers	1–17				

== Schedule ==
Session	Game	Time*	Matchup	Score	Television	Attendance
First round – Wednesday, March 9
1	1	4:30 pm	No. 13 Minnesota vs. No. 12 Illinois	52–85	ESPN2	16,528
1	2	7:00 pm	No. 14 Rutgers vs. No. 11 Nebraska	72–89	BTN	16,528
Second round – Thursday, March 10
2	3	12:00 pm	No. 8 Michigan vs. No. 9 Northwestern	72–70^{OT}	BTN	15,707
2	4	2:30 pm	No. 5 Iowa vs. No. 12 Illinois	66–68	BTN	15,707
3	5	6:30 pm	No. 7 Ohio State vs. No. 10 Penn State	79–75	ESPN2	15,751
3	6	9:00 pm	No. 6 Wisconsin vs. No. 11 Nebraska	58–70	ESPN2	15,751
Quarterfinals – Friday, March 11
4	7	12:00 pm	No. 1 Indiana vs. No. 8 Michigan	69–72	ESPN	18,355
4	8	2:30 pm	No. 4 Purdue vs. No. 12 Illinois	89–58	ESPN	18,355
5	9	6:30 pm	No. 2 Michigan State vs. No. 7 Ohio State	81–54	BTN	15,942
5	10	9:00 pm	No. 3 Maryland vs. No. 11 Nebraska	97–86	BTN	15,942
Semifinals – Saturday, March 12
6	11	1:00 pm	No. 4 Purdue vs. No. 8 Michigan	76–59	CBS	18,339
6	12	3:30 pm	No. 2 Michigan State vs. No. 3 Maryland	64–61	CBS	18,339
Championship – Sunday, March 13
7	13	3:00 pm	No. 2 Michigan State vs. No. 4 Purdue	66–62	CBS	16,429
*Game times in Eastern Time. (Note: The United States begins Daylight saving time at 2:00 am on Sunday, March 13. As a result, times through the semifinal games are in Eastern Standard Time while the Championship game time is in Eastern Daylight Time.) Rankings denote tournament seed

== Game summaries ==
=== First round ===
ESPN2

Mar 9
4:30 pm

Recap

No. 12 Illinois 85, No. 13 Minnesota 52
Scoring by half: 38–22, 47–30
Pts: Michael Finke 17; Rebs: Malcolm Hill 6 Asts: Jaylon Tate 4	Pts: Charles Buggs 12; Rebs: Jordan Murphy 9 Asts: Jordan Murphy 3

Bankers Life Fieldhouse
Indianapolis, IN
Attendance: 16,528
Referees: Larry Scirotto, D.J. Carstensen, Chris Beaver

BTN

Mar 9
7:00 pm

Recap

No. 11 Nebraska 89, No. 14 Rutgers 72
Scoring by half: 37–33, 52–39
Pts: Shavon Shields 20; Rebs: Shavon Shields 11; Asts: Glynn Watson Jr. 5	Pts: Mike Williams 14; Rebs: Jonathan Laurent, Greg Lewis 7 Asts: Bishop Daniels, Corey Sanders 4

Bankers Life Fieldhouse
Indianapolis, IN
Attendance: 16,528
Referees: Bill Ek, Paul Szeic, Bo Boroski

=== Second round ===
BTN

Mar 10
12:00 pm

Recap

No. 8 Michigan 72, No. 9 Northwestern 70 (OT)
Scoring by half: 34–25, 26–35 Overtime: 12–10
Pts: Duncan Robinson 21; Rebs: Muhammad-Ali Abdur-Rahkman, Zak Irvin 8 Asts: Derrick Walton Jr. 5	Pts: Tre Demps 21; Rebs: Alex Olah 13; Asts: Bryant McIntosh 5

Bankers Life Fieldhouse
Indianapolis, IN
Attendance: 15,707
Referees: Gene Steratore, Chris Beaver, Ted Valentine

BTN

Mar 10
2:30 pm

Recap

No. 5 Iowa 66, No. 12 Illinois 68
Scoring by half: 35–37, 31–31
Pts: Peter Jok 29; Rebs: Adam Woodbury 10; Asts: Mike Gesell 8	Pts: Jalen Coleman-Lands 17; Rebs: Maverick Morgan 7 Asts: Malcolm Hill 5

Bankers Life Fieldhouse
Indianapolis, IN
Attendance: 15,707
Referees: Larry Scirotto, Paul Szeic, Bo Boroski

ESPN2

Mar 10
6:30 pm

Recap

No. 7 Ohio State 79, No. 10 Penn State 75
Scoring by half: 37–34, 38–45
Pts: Marc Loving 24; Rebs: JaQuan Lyle 10; Asts: JaQuan Lyle 5	Pts: Shep Garner 25; Rebs: Brandon Taylor, Shep Garner 5 Asts: Shep Garner 5

Bankers Life Fieldhouse
Indianapolis, IN
Attendance: 15,751
Referees: Bill Ek, D.J. Carstensen, Donnie Eppley

ESPN2

Mar 10
9:00 pm

Recap

No. 6 Wisconsin 58, No. 11 Nebraska 70
Scoring by half: 21–26, 37–44
Pts: Ethan Happ 17; Rebs: Vitto Brown 8 Asts: Bronson Koenig 4	Pts: Shavon Shields 20; Rebs: Shavon Shields 9 Asts: Shavon Shields 2

Bankers Life Fieldhouse
Indianapolis, IN
Attendance: 15,751
Referees: Terry Wymer, Lamont Simpson, Steve McJunkins

=== Quarterfinals ===
ESPN

Mar 11
12:00 pm

Recap

No. 1 Indiana 69, No. 8 Michigan 72
Scoring by half: 37–36, 32–36
Pts: Troy Williams 16; Rebs: Thomas Bryant 7 Asts: Yogi Ferrell 8	Pts: Zak Irvin 17; Rebs: Zak Irvin 5 Asts: Derrick Walton Jr. 12

Bankers Life Fieldhouse
Indianapolis, IN
Attendance: 18,355
Referees: Ted Valentine, Paul Szelc, Chris Beaver

ESPN

Mar 11
2:30 pm

Recap

No. 4 Purdue 89, No. 12 Illinois 58
Scoring by half: 45–25, 44–33
Pts: Isaac Haas 16; Rebs: Caleb Swanigan 12; Asts: Johnny Hill 6	Pts: Maverick Morgan 17; Rebs: Malcolm Hill 7 Asts: Four tied 2

Bankers Life Fieldhouse
Indianapolis, IN
Attendance: 18,355
Referees: Bill Ek, Lamont Simpson, D.J. Carstensen

BTN

Mar 11
6:30 pm

Recap

No. 2 Michigan State 81, No. 7 Ohio State 54
Scoring by half: 33–26, 48–28
Pts: Denzel Valentine 19; Rebs: Denzel Valentine 9 Asts: Denzel Valentine 8	Pts: JaQuan Lyle 10; Rebs: Loving, Bates-Diop 6 Asts: Three Tied 2

Bankers Life Fieldhouse
Indianapolis, IN
Attendance: 15,942
Referees: Terry Wymer, Bo Boroski, Donnie Epley

BTN

Mar 11
9:00 pm

Recap

No. 3 Maryland 97, No. 11 Nebraska 86
Scoring by half: 54–37, 43–49
Pts: Jake Layman 26; Rebs: Diamond Stone 8 Asts: Melo Trimble 8	Pts: Andrew White 25; Rebs: Michael Jacobson 6 Asts: Glynn Watson Jr. 3

Bankers Life Fieldhouse
Indianapolis, IN
Attendance: 15,942
Referees: Larry Scirotto, Gene Steratore, Robert Riley

=== Semifinals ===
CBS

Mar 12
1:00 pm

Recap

No. 4 Purdue 76, No. 8 Michigan 59
Scoring by half: 38–30, 38–29
Pts: A. J. Hammons 27; Rebs: A. J. Hammons 11; Asts: Rapheal Davis 6	Pts: Muhammad-Ali Abdur-Rahkman 15; Rebs: Derrick Walton Jr. 6 Asts: Derrick Walton Jr. 5

Bankers Life Fieldhouse
Indianapolis, IN
Attendance: 18,339
Referees: Larry Scirotto, D.J. Carstensen, Ted Valentine

CBS

Mar 12
3:30 pm

Recap

No. 2 Michigan State 64, No. 3 Maryland 61
Scoring by half: 41–33, 23–28
Pts: Denzel Valentine 18; Rebs: Denzel Valentine 7 Asts: Denzel Valentine 10	Pts: Robert Carter 18; Rebs: Robert Carter 8 Asts: Rasheed Sulaimon 3

Bankers Life Fieldhouse
Indianapolis, IN
Attendance: 18,339
Referees: Terry Wymer, Gene Steratore, Bo Boroski

=== Championship ===
CBS

Mar 13
3:00 pm

No. 2 Michigan State 66, No. 4 Purdue 62
Scoring by half: 36–26, 30–36
Pts: Denzel Valentine 15; Rebs: Denzel Valentine 10; Asts: Denzel Valentine 9	Pts: Vincent Edwards 19; Rebs: A. J. Hammons 9 Asts: Rapheal Davis 3

Bankers Life Fieldhouse
Indianapolis, IN
Attendance: 16,429
Referees: Terry Wymer, Gene Steratore, Ted Valentine

== Bracket ==
First round Wednesday, March 9 ESPN2/BTN
12	Illinois	85
13	Minnesota	52
11	Nebraska	89
14	Rutgers	72

Second round Thursday, March 10; ESPN2/BTN
8	Michigan	72*
9	Northwestern	70
5	Iowa	66
12	Illinois	68
7	Ohio State	79
10	Penn State	75
6	Wisconsin	58
11	Nebraska	70

Quarterfinals; Friday, March 11; ESPN/BTN
1	Indiana	69
8	Michigan	72
4	Purdue	89
12	Illinois	58
2	Michigan State	81
7	Ohio State	54
3	Maryland	97
11	Nebraska	86

Semifinals; Saturday, March 12; CBS
8	Michigan	59
4	Purdue	76
2	Michigan State	64
3	Maryland	61

Championship; Sunday, March 13; CBS
4	Purdue	62
2	Michigan State	66

* denotes overtime period

== All-Tournament Team ==
- Denzel Valentine, Michigan State – Big Ten tournament Most Outstanding Player
- Zak Irvin, Michigan
- Shavon Shields, Nebraska
- Vincent Edwards, Purdue
- A. J. Hammons, Purdue

== See also ==
- 2016 Big Ten Conference women's basketball tournament
