= 2015–16 Nebraska Cornhuskers men's basketball team =

American college basketball season

2015–16 Nebraska Cornhuskers men's basketball
- Conference: Big Ten Conference
- Record: 16–18 (6–12 Big Ten)
- Head coach: Tim Miles (4th season)
- Assistant coaches: Kenya Hunter; Jim Molinari; Phil Beckner
- Home arena: Pinnacle Bank Arena

2015–16 Big Ten Conference men's basketball standings
	Conf.				Overall
Team	W		L	PCT	W		L	PCT
No. 14 Indiana	15	–	3	.833	27	–	8	.771
No. 2 Michigan State †	13	–	5	.722	29	–	6	.829
No. 18 Maryland	12	–	6	.667	27	–	9	.750
No. 12 Purdue	12	–	6	.667	26	–	9	.743
No. 25 Iowa	12	–	6	.667	22	–	11	.667
Wisconsin	12	–	6	.667	22	–	13	.629
Ohio State	11	–	7	.611	21	–	14	.600
Michigan	10	–	8	.556	23	–	13	.639
Northwestern	8	–	10	.444	20	–	12	.625
Penn State	7	–	11	.389	16	–	16	.500
Nebraska	6	–	12	.333	16	–	18	.471
Illinois	5	–	13	.278	15	–	19	.441
Minnesota	2	–	16	.111	11	–	20	.355
Rutgers	1	–	17	.056	7	–	25	.219
† 2016 Big Ten tournament winner Rankings from AP poll

The 2015–16 Nebraska Cornhuskers men's basketball team represented the University of Nebraska–Lincoln in the 2015–16 NCAA Division I men's basketball season. Led by head coach Tim Miles in his fourth season, the Cornhuskers played their home games at Pinnacle Bank Arena in downtown Lincoln, Nebraska and were members of the Big Ten Conference. They finished the season 16–18, 6–12 in Big Ten play to finish in 11th place. In the Big Ten tournament they defeated Rutgers and Wisconsin to advance to the quarterfinals where they lost to Maryland.

== Previous season ==
The Cornhuskers finished the 2014–15 Season 13–18, 5–13 in Big Ten play to finish in twelfth place. They lost in the first round of the Big Ten tournament to Penn State.

== Departures ==
Name	Number	Pos.	Height	Weight	Year	Hometown	Notes
David Rivers	2	G	6'7"	220	Senior	Little Rock, AR	Graduated
Terran Petteway	5	F	6'6"	215	RS Junior	Galveston, TX	Declare for 2015 NBA draft
Trevor Menke	10	G	5'11"	184	RS Senior	Beatrice, NE	Graduated
Tarin Smith	11	G	6'2"	175	Freshman	Asbury Park, NJ	Transferred to Duquesne
Moses Ayegba	12	C	6'9"	252	Senior	Kano, Nigeria	Graduated
Leslee Smith	21	F	6'8"	254	Senior	Long Look, BVI	Graduated
B.J. Day	25	F	6'5"	236	RS Freshman	Lincoln, NE	Left team Sept. 17th, 2015 due to injuries. Spot filled by T. Borchardt in Oct.
Walter Pitchford	35	F	6'10"	237	RS Junior	Grand Rapids, MI	Declared for 2015 NBA draft, later withdrew for other professional avenues
Kye Kurkowski	44	C	6'10"	221	RS Senior	Grant, NE	Graduated

=== Incoming transfers ===
Name	Number	Pos.	Height	Weight	Year	Hometown	Previous School
Anton Gill	1	G	6'4"	190	Junior	Raleigh, NC	Transferred from Louisville. Under NCAA transfer rules, Gill will have to redshirt for the 2015–16 season. Will have two years of remaining eligibility.
Malcolm Laws	15	G	6'1"	195	Sophomore	Orlando, FL	Transferred from Florida Atlantic. Under NCAA transfer rules, Laws will have to sit out for the 2015–16 season. Will have three years of remaining eligibility.

== Incoming Recruits ==
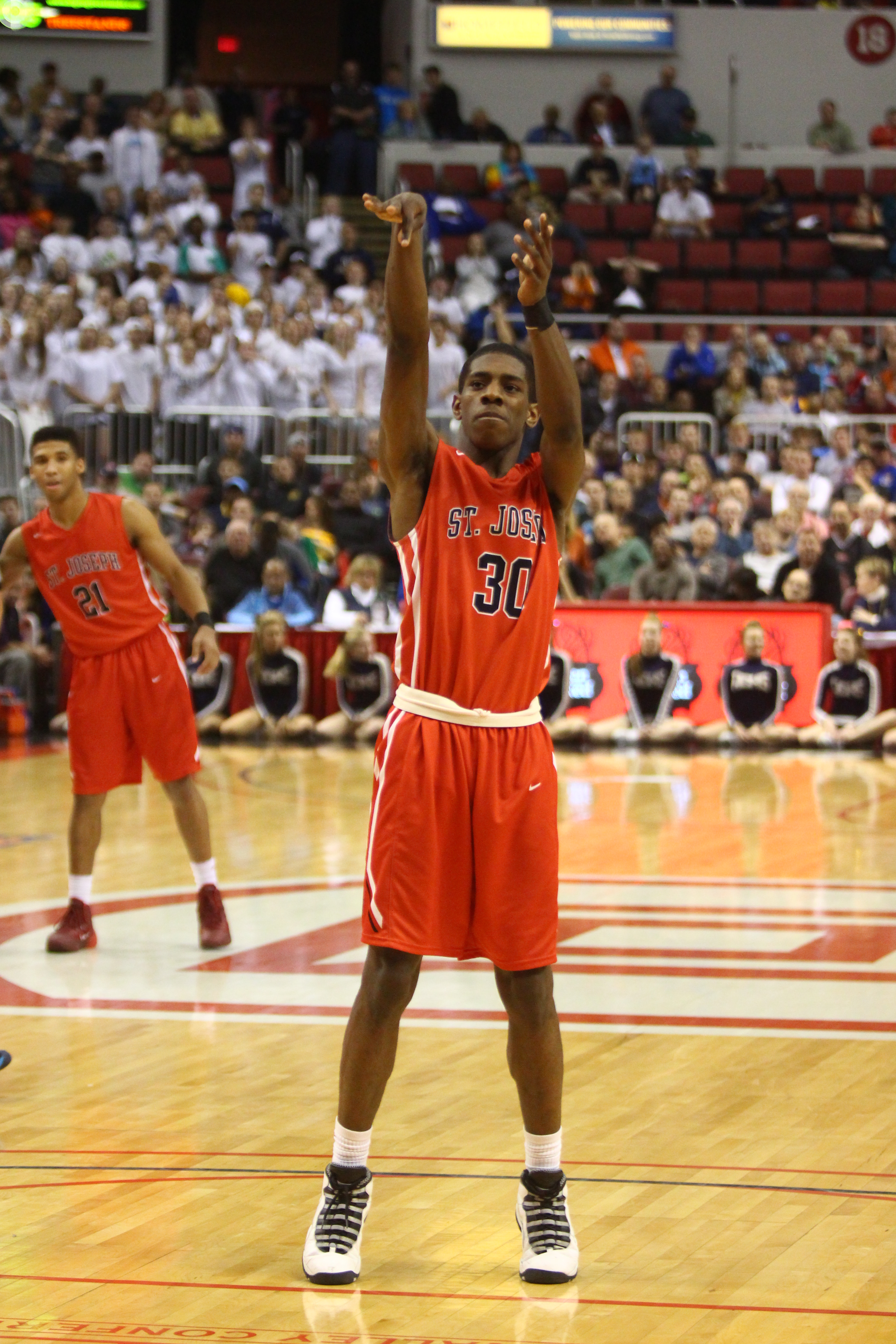
Glynn Watson at the line in the 2015 IHSA 3A championship game victory

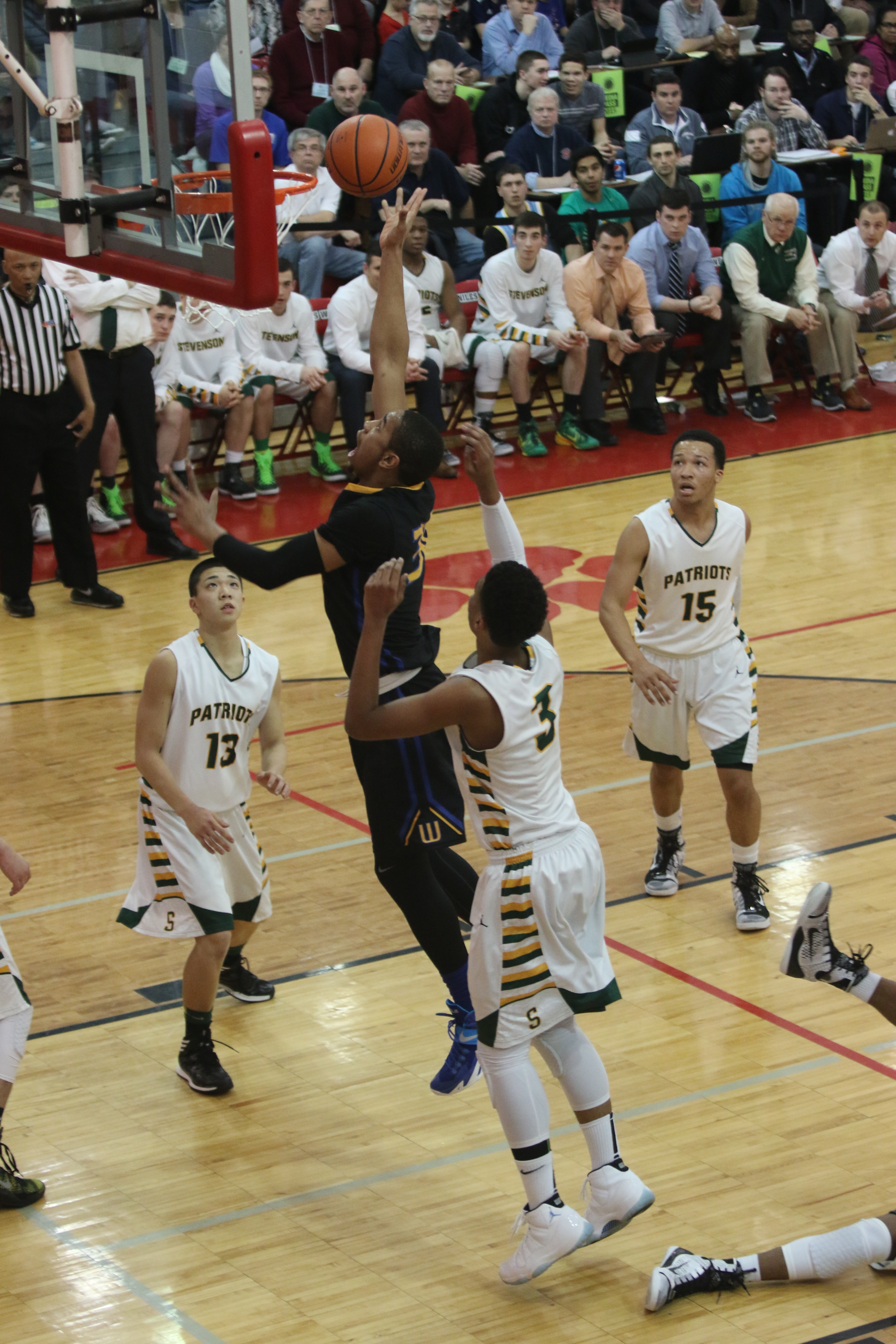
Ed Morrow attacks the paint against 2015 IHSA 4A state champion Stevenson.

College recruiting information
Name	Hometown	School	Height	Weight	Commit date
Ed Morrow, Jr. PF	Chicago, IL	Simeon Career	6 ft 7 in (2.01 m)	215 lb (98 kg)	Sep 22, 2014
Ed Morrow, Jr. PF	Recruit ratings: Scout: Rivals: (85)				
Glynn Watson; PG	Westchester, IL	St. Joseph	5 ft 11 in (1.80 m)	160 lb (73 kg)	Sep 1, 2014
Glynn Watson; PG	Recruit ratings: Scout: Rivals: (84)				
Michael Jacobson; PF	Waukee, IA	Waukee	6 ft 8 in (2.03 m)	220 lb (100 kg)	Jul 31, 2014
Michael Jacobson; PF	Recruit ratings: Scout: Rivals: (70)				
Bakari Evelyn; PG	Southfield, MI	Southfield Christian	6 ft 0 in (1.83 m)	150 lb (68 kg)	Apr 14, 2015
Bakari Evelyn; PG	Recruit ratings: Scout: Rivals: (N/A)				
Jack McVeigh; SF	Canberra, Australia	Australian Institute of Sport	6 ft 8 in (2.03 m)	210 lb (95 kg)	Jan 16, 2015
Jack McVeigh; SF	Recruit ratings: Scout: Rivals: (N/A)				
Overall recruit ranking:
Note: In many cases, Scout, Rivals, 247Sports, On3, and ESPN may conflict in their listings of height and weight.; In these cases, the average was taken. ESPN grades are on a 100-point scale.; Sources: "2015 Team Ranking". Rivals.

=== 2016 Recruiting Class ===
College recruiting information (2016)
Name	Hometown	School	Height	Weight	Commit date
Isaiah Roby; SF	Dixon, IL	Dixon	6 ft 7 in (2.01 m)	185 lb (84 kg)	Oct 21, 2014
Isaiah Roby; SF	Recruit ratings: Scout: Rivals: (N/A)				
Keanu Pinder; SF	Perth, Australia	Hutchinson C.C.	6 ft 8 in (2.03 m)	195 lb (88 kg)	Oct 13, 2013
Keanu Pinder; SF	Recruit ratings: Scout: Rivals: (JC)				
Overall recruit ranking:
Note: In many cases, Scout, Rivals, 247Sports, On3, and ESPN may conflict in their listings of height and weight.; In these cases, the average was taken. ESPN grades are on a 100-point scale.; Sources: "2016 Team Ranking". Rivals.

== Roster ==
2015–16 Nebraska Cornhuskers men's basketball team
Players
Coaches

Pos.	#	Name	Height	Weight	Year	Hometown
G	0	Tai Webster	6 ft 3 in (1.91 m)	199 lb (90 kg)	Jr	Auckland, New Zealand
G	1	Anton Gill (I) (redshirt)	6 ft 3 in (1.91 m)	190 lb (86 kg)	Jr	Raleigh, NC
G	3	Andrew White	6 ft 7 in (2.01 m)	220 lb (100 kg)	RS Jr	Richmond, VA
G	4	Johnny Trueblood (W)	6 ft 4 in (1.93 m)	195 lb (88 kg)	Fr	Elkhorn, NE
G	5	Glynn Watson Jr.	6 ft 0 in (1.83 m)	160 lb (73 kg)	Fr	Bellwood, IL
F	10	Jack McVeigh	6 ft 7 in (2.01 m)	210 lb (95 kg)	Fr	Gold Coast, Australia
G	11	Bakari Evelyn	6 ft 2 in (1.88 m)	175 lb (79 kg)	Fr	Detroit, MI
F	12	Michael Jacobson	6 ft 8 in (2.03 m)	220 lb (100 kg)	Fr	Waukee, IA
G	15	Malcolm Laws (I) (redshirt)	6 ft 1 in (1.85 m)	195 lb (88 kg)	So	Orlando, FL
F	20	Tanner Borchardt (W)	6 ft 8 in (2.03 m)	275 lb (125 kg)	Fr	Gothenburg, NE
G	23	Nick Fuller	6 ft 6 in (1.98 m)	207 lb (94 kg)	RS So	Sun Prairie, WI
C	24	Jacob Hammond	6 ft 10 in (2.08 m)	230 lb (104 kg)	So	Duncan, OK
F	30	Edward Morrow	6 ft 7 in (2.01 m)	215 lb (98 kg)	Fr	Chicago, IL
G	31	Shavon Shields	6 ft 6 in (1.98 m)	221 lb (100 kg)	Sr	Olathe, KS
G	32	Benny Parker	5 ft 9 in (1.75 m)	172 lb (78 kg)	Sr	Kansas City, KS

Head coach

- Tim Miles (Mary)

Assistant coach(es)

- Chris Harriman (Augusta State)
- Kenya Hunter (Duquesne)
- Jim Molinari (Illinois Wesleyan)

Legend

- (C) Team captain
- (S) Suspended
- (I) Ineligible
- (W) Walk-on
- Injured
- Current redshirt

Roster

== Schedule ==
Date time, TV	Rank^{#}	Opponent^{#}	Result	Record	Site (attendance) city, state
Spanish exhibition tour
Aug 16, 2015*; 1:00 pm		at Eurocolegio Casvi	W 79–64		Castillo de Villaviciosa; Madrid, Spain
Aug 18, 2015*; 10:00 am		at Albacete Basket (Liga EBA)	W 66–63		Pabellón del Parque; Albacete, Spain
Aug 21, 2015*; 1:00 pm		at Europe Basketball Academy	W 108–73		Barcelona, Spain
Aug 22, 2015*; 1:00 pm		at CB Castelldefels (Primera División)	W 71–65		Barcelona, Spain
Exhibition
Nov 9, 2015*; 7:00 pm, BTN		Northern State	W 95–42		Pinnacle Bank Arena (15,263); Lincoln, NE
Non-conference regular season
Nov 14, 2015*; 7:00 pm		Mississippi Valley State	W 97–51	1–0	Pinnacle Bank Arena (15,489); Lincoln, NE
Nov 17, 2015*; 7:30 pm, FS1		at No. 11 Villanova; Gavitt Tipoff Games	L 63–87	1–1	The Pavilion (6,500); Villanova, PA
Nov 19, 2015*; 7:00 pm		Delaware State	W 75–60	2–1	Pinnacle Bank Arena (15,447); Lincoln, NE
Nov 22, 2015*; 6:00 pm, BTN		Southeastern Louisiana; Barclays Center Classic Opening Round	W 92–65	3–1	Pinnacle Bank Arena (15,533); Lincoln, NE
Nov 24, 2015*; 7:00 pm		Arkansas–Pine Bluff; Barclays Center Classic Opening Round	W 67–44	4–1	Pinnacle Bank Arena (15,502); Lincoln, NE
Nov 27, 2015*; 5:30 pm, ASN		vs. No. 24 Cincinnati; Barclays Center Classic, Barclays Bracket Semifinals	L 61–65	4–2	Barclays Center (N/A); Brooklyn, NY
Nov 28, 2015*; 11:00 am		vs. Tennessee; Barclays Center Classic, Barclays Bracket Consolation	W 82–71	5–2	Barclays Center (N/A); Brooklyn, NY
Dec 1, 2015*; 8:00 pm, ESPNU		No. 21 Miami (FL); ACC–Big Ten Challenge	L 72–77 ^{OT}	5–3	Pinnacle Bank Arena (15,646); Lincoln, NE
Dec 5, 2015*; 1:00 pm		Abilene Christian	W 73–63	6–3	Pinnacle Bank Arena (15,491); Lincoln, NE
Dec 9, 2015*; 7:00 pm, CBSSN		at Creighton; Rivalry	L 67–83	6–4	CenturyLink Center (17,766); Omaha, NE
Dec 13, 2015*; 1:00 pm, ESPN3		Rhode Island	W 70–67	7–4	Pinnacle Bank Arena (15,496); Lincoln, NE
Dec 20, 2015*; 6:00 pm, BTN		Samford	L 58–69	7–5	Pinnacle Bank Arena (14,871); Lincoln, NE
Dec 22, 2015*; 7:00 pm		Prairie View A&M	W 81–50	8–5	Pinnacle Bank Arena (14,754); Lincoln, NE
Big Ten regular season
Dec 30, 2015; 3:00 pm, ESPNU		Northwestern	L 72–81	8–6 (0–1)	Pinnacle Bank Arena (14,924); Lincoln, NE
Jan 2, 2016; 3:00 pm, BTN		Indiana	L 69–79	8–7 (0–2)	Pinnacle Bank Arena (14,961); Lincoln, NE
Jan 5, 2016; 8:00 pm, BTN		at No. 19 Iowa	L 66–77	8–8 (0–3)	Carver–Hawkeye Arena (11,736); Iowa City, IA
Jan 9, 2016; 4:00 pm, ESPNU		at Rutgers	W 90–56	9–8 (1–3)	The RAC (4,454); Piscataway, NJ
Jan 12, 2016; 8:00 pm, BTN		Minnesota	W 84–59	10–8 (2–3)	Pinnacle Bank Arena (15,628); Lincoln, NE
Jan 16, 2016; 1:30 pm, BTN		at Illinois	W 78–67	11–8 (3–3)	State Farm Center (12,510); Champaign, IL
Jan 20, 2016; 5:30 pm, BTN		at No. 11 Michigan State	W 72–71	12–8 (4–3)	Breslin Center (14,797); East Lansing, MI
Jan 23, 2016; 1:00 pm, ESPN2		Michigan	L 68–81	12–9 (4–4)	Pinnacle Bank Arena (15,745); Lincoln, NE
Jan 30, 2016; 3:30 pm, BTN		at No. 21 Purdue	L 74–89	12–10 (4–5)	Mackey Arena (14,846); West Lafayette, IN
Feb 3, 2016; 7:30 pm, BTN		No. 4 Maryland	L 65–70	12–11 (4–6)	Pinnacle Bank Arena (15,693); Lincoln, NE
Feb 6, 2016; 1:00 pm, ESPNU		Rutgers	W 87–63	13–11 (5–6)	Pinnacle Bank Arena (15,695); Lincoln, NE
Feb 10, 2016; 6:00 pm, BTN		at Wisconsin	L 61–72	13–12 (5–7)	Kohl Center (17,287); Madison, WI
Feb 13, 2016; 5:00 pm, ESPNU		Penn State	W 70–54	14–12 (6–7)	Pinnacle Bank Arena (15,613); Lincoln, NE
Feb 17, 2016; 7:30 pm, BTN		at No. 22 Indiana	L 64–80	14–13 (6–8)	Assembly Hall (17,472); Bloomington, IN
Feb 20, 2016; 6:00 pm, BTN		Ohio State	L 62–65 ^{OT}	14–14 (6–9)	Pinnacle Bank Arena (15,679); Lincoln, NE
Feb 25, 2016; 6:00 pm, ESPNU		at Penn State	L 55–56	14–15 (6–10)	Bryce Jordan Center (7,385); University Park, PA
Mar 1, 2016; 7:00 pm, BTN		No. 15 Purdue	L 62–81	14–16 (6–11)	Pinnacle Bank Arena (15,572); Lincoln, NE
Mar 6, 2016; 1:00 pm, BTN		at Northwestern	L 54–65	14–17 (6–12)	Welsh-Ryan Arena (7,702); Evanston, IL
Big Ten tournament
Mar 9, 2016; 6:00 pm, BTN	(11)	vs. (14) Rutgers; First round	W 89–72	15–17	Bankers Life Fieldhouse (16,528); Indianapolis, IN
Mar 10, 2016; 8:00 pm, ESPN2	(11)	vs. (6) Wisconsin; Second round	W 70–58	16–17	Bankers Life Fieldhouse (15,751); Indianapolis, IN
Mar 11, 2016; 9:00 pm, BTN	(11)	vs. (3) No. 18 Maryland; Quarterfinals	L 86–97	16–18	Bankers Life Fieldhouse (15,942); Indianapolis, IN
*Non-conference game. ^{#}Rankings from AP Poll. (#) Tournament seedings in parentheses. All times are in Central Time.
