= 2016 NBA Development League draft =

General information
- Sport: Basketball
- Date: October 30, 2016

Overview
- League: NBA
- First selection: Anthony Brown, Erie Bayhawks

The 2016 NBA Development League draft was the 16th draft of the National Basketball Association Development League (NBDL). The draft was held on October 30, 2016, just before the 2016–17 season.

== Key ==
Pos.	G	F	C
Position	Guard	Forward	Center

^	Denotes player who has been selected to (an) NBA Development League All-Star Game(s)
*	Denotes player who has been selected to (an) NBA Development League All-Star Game(s) and was also selected in an NBA draft
†	Denotes player who was also selected in an NBA Draft

== Draft ==
=== First round ===
Pick	Player	Pos.	Nationality	Team	College/Country
1	Anthony Brown^{†}	F	United States	Erie Bayhawks	Stanford
2	Jaleel Roberts	C	United States	Santa Cruz Warriors	UNC-Asheville
3	Alex Hamilton	G	United States	Oklahoma City Blue (via Santa Cruz)	Louisiana Tech
4	Travis Leslie^{†}	G	United States	Fort Wayne Mad Ants	Georgia
5	Chris Horton	F	United States	Grand Rapids Drive (via Salt Lake City)	Austin Peay
6	Dallas Lauderdale	F	United States	Fort Wayne Mad Ants (via Maine)	Ohio St
7	Brannen Greene	G	United States	Delaware 87ers	Kansas
8	Michael Bryson	G	United States	Northern Arizona Suns	UC Santa Barbara
9	Keith Hornsby	G	United States	Texas Legends	LSU
10	LaDontae Henton	F	United States	Santa Cruz Warriors	Providence
11	Quinton Chievous	G	United States	Iowa Energy	Tennessee
12	Aaron Thomas	G/F	United States	Windy City Bulls	Florida St
13	Shonn Miller	G/F	United States	Greensboro Swarm	Cornell
14	Boris Dallo	G	France	Long Island Nets	France
15	Jaylen Bland	G	United States	Salt Lake City (via Los Angeles D-Fenders)	Cal-Riverside
16	Max Hooper	G	United States	Westchester Knicks	Oakland
17	T. J. Price	G	United States	Rio Grande Valley Vipers	Western Kentucky
18	Maurice Bolden	F	United States	Austin Spurs	Southern Mississippi
19	Roosevelt Jones	G	United States	Canton Charge	Butler
20	Adam Woodbury	C	United States		
21					
22					
