= 2015–16 Michigan State Spartans men's basketball team =

American college basketball season

2015–16 Michigan State Spartans men's basketball

Big Ten tournament champions Wooden Legacy Champions

NCAA tournament, First Round
- Conference: Big Ten Conference

Ranking
- Coaches: No. 7
- AP: No. 2
- Record: 29–6 (13–5 Big Ten)
- Head coach: Tom Izzo (21st season)
- Associate head coach: Dwayne Stephens (13th season)
- Assistant coaches: Mike Garland (9th season); Dane Fife (5th season)
- Captains: Denzel Valentine; Matt Costello; Lourawls Nairn, Jr.
- Home arena: Breslin Center

2015–16 Big Ten Conference men's basketball standings
| | Conf. | | | | Overall |
| Team | W | | L | PCT | W | | L | PCT |
|---|---|---|---|---|---|---|---|---|
| No. 14 Indiana | 15 | – | 3 | .833 | 27 | – | 8 | .771 |
| No. 2 Michigan State † | 13 | – | 5 | .722 | 29 | – | 6 | .829 |
| No. 18 Maryland | 12 | – | 6 | .667 | 27 | – | 9 | .750 |
| No. 12 Purdue | 12 | – | 6 | .667 | 26 | – | 9 | .743 |
| No. 25 Iowa | 12 | – | 6 | .667 | 22 | – | 11 | .667 |
| Wisconsin | 12 | – | 6 | .667 | 22 | – | 13 | .629 |
| Ohio State | 11 | – | 7 | .611 | 21 | – | 14 | .600 |
| Michigan | 10 | – | 8 | .556 | 23 | – | 13 | .639 |
| Northwestern | 8 | – | 10 | .444 | 20 | – | 12 | .625 |
| Penn State | 7 | – | 11 | .389 | 16 | – | 16 | .500 |
| Nebraska | 6 | – | 12 | .333 | 16 | – | 18 | .471 |
| Illinois | 5 | – | 13 | .278 | 15 | – | 19 | .441 |
| Minnesota | 2 | – | 16 | .111 | 11 | – | 20 | .355 |
| Rutgers | 1 | – | 17 | .056 | 7 | – | 25 | .219 |
† 2016 Big Ten tournament winner Rankings from AP poll

The 2015–16 Michigan State Spartans men's basketball team represented Michigan State University in the 2015–16 NCAA Division I men's basketball season. The Spartans, led by 21st-year head coach Tom Izzo, played their home games at the Breslin Center and were members of the Big Ten Conference. They finished the season 29–6, 13–5 in Big Ten play to finish in second place. They defeated Ohio State, Maryland, and Purdue to win the Big Ten tournament. As a result, they received the conference's automatic bid to the NCAA tournament, their 19th straight NCAA tournament appearance. As the No. 2 seed in the Midwest region, they were upset by No. 15 seed Middle Tennessee in what was, at the time, considered to be one of the biggest upsets in NCAA tournament history.

== Previous season ==
The Spartans finished the 2014–15 season 27–12, 12–6 in Big Ten play to finish in third place. They received an at-large bid as the No. 7 seed in the NCAA tournament, their 18th straight trip to the tournament. The Spartans advanced to the Final Four, their seventh trip to the Final Four under Tom Izzo, before losing to eventual National Champion, Duke.

== Offseason ==
The Spartans lost Branden Dawson (11.9 points and 9.1 rebounds per game) to the NBA draft and Travis Trice (15.3 points and 5.1 assist per game) to graduation following the season.

=== Departures ===
| Name | Number | Pos. | Height | Weight | Year | Hometown | Notes |
|---|---|---|---|---|---|---|---|
| Branden Dawson | 3 | F | 6'6" | 225 | Senior | Gary, IN | Graduated and selected in NBA Draft |
| Travis Trice | 20 | G | 6'0" | 170 | Senior | Huber Heights, OH | Graduated |

=== Recruiting class ===
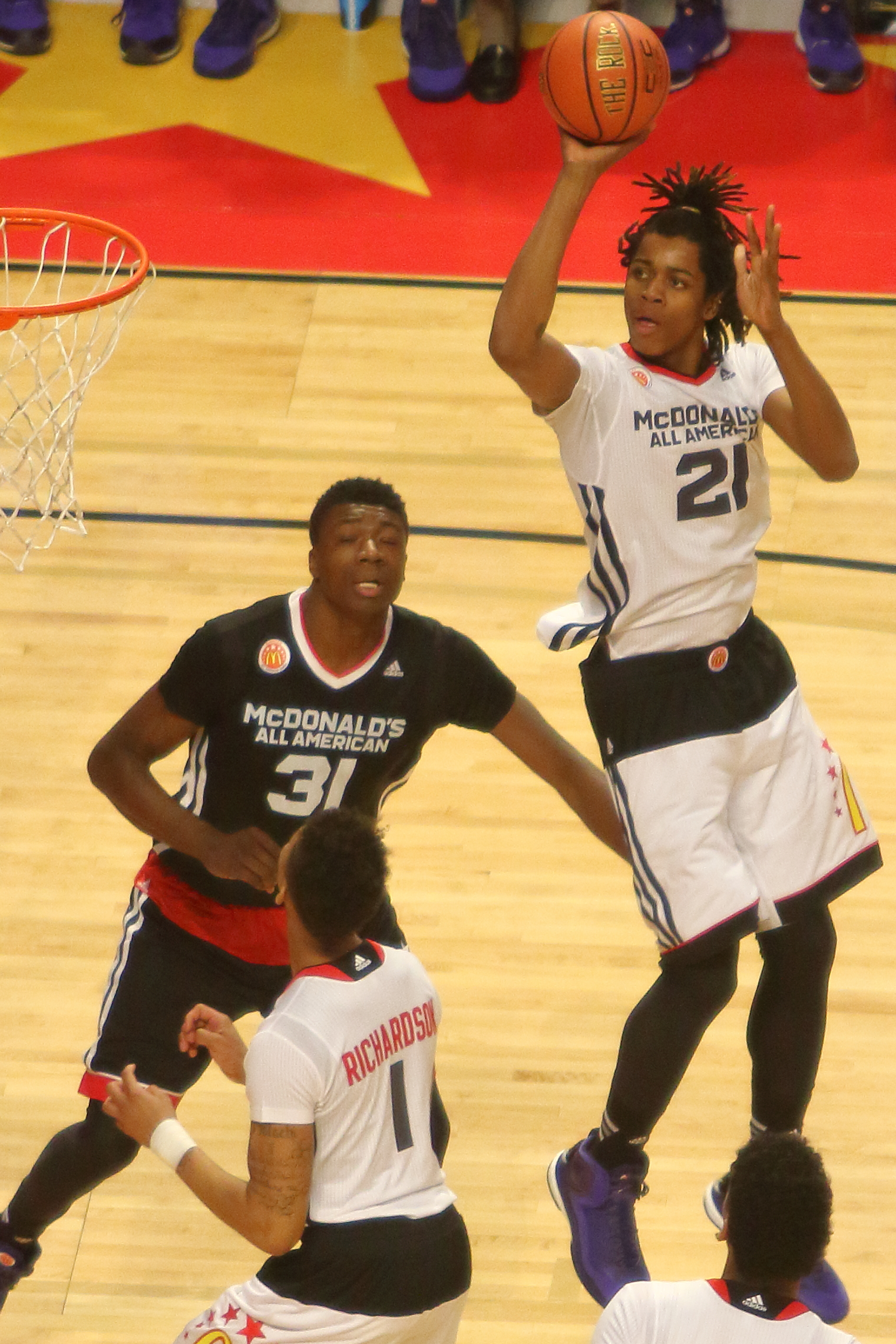
Deyonta Davis at the 2015 McDonald's All-American Boys Game

The Spartans 2015 recruiting class was ranked 18th in the nation. Leading the class was the No. 22 overall recruit, Deyonta Davis.

College recruiting
| Name | Hometown | School | Height | Weight | Commit date |
|---|---|---|---|---|---|
| Deyonta Davis; No. 6 PF | Muskegon, MI | Muskegon High School | 6 ft 9 in (2.06 m) | 210 lb (95 kg) | Dec 11, 2013 |
| Deyonta Davis; No. 6 PF | Recruit ratings: Scout: Rivals: 247Sports: ESPN: | | | | |
| Matt McQuaid; No. 22 SG | Duncanville, TX | Duncanville High School | 6 ft 4 in (1.93 m) | 175 lb (79 kg) | Sep 25, 2014 |
| Matt McQuaid; No. 22 SG | Recruit ratings: Scout: Rivals: 247Sports: ESPN: | | | | |
| Kyle Ahrens; No. 35 SG | Versailles, OH | Versailles High School | 6 ft 5 in (1.96 m) | 180 lb (82 kg) | Jun 7, 2014 |
| Kyle Ahrens; No. 35 SG | Recruit ratings: Scout: Rivals: 247Sports: ESPN: | | | | |
Overall recruit ranking:
Note: In many cases, Scout, Rivals, 247Sports, On3, and ESPN may conflict in their listings of height and weight.; In these cases, the average was taken. ESPN grades are on a 100-point scale.; Sources: "Michigan State Commit List for 2015". Rivals.; "Men's Basketball Recruiting". Scout.; "ESPN - Michigan State Spartans Basketball Recruiting 2015". ESPN.; "Scout.com Team Recruiting Rankings". Scout.; "2015 Team Ranking". Rivals.

== Preseason ==
For the first time since 1991 and for the first time in Tom Izzo's tenure as head coach at Michigan State, Michigan State made a preseason trip abroad. Beginning August 22, 2015, they traveled to Italy for 11 days for sightseeing and four games against international teams. The first of the four games was a win against a newer Italian professional club team. They followed up this game with games against the Russian, Italian, and Georgian National Teams on consecutive nights. Michigan State finished the trip 1–3 with a win over the club team and losses to the national teams. Despite the losses, head coach Tom Izzo stated, “This trip was as good as anything I’ve done in my 20 years.” The high points from the trip were Gavin Schilling's performance (17 points each in the final two games) and Denzel Valentine who scored in double figures in all but the last game. Eron Harris and Alvin Ellis III were allowed to travel with the team, but were not allowed to play due to their preseason legal issues.

Prior to the season beginning in November, the Spartans were ranked No. 13 in the preseason AP and Coaches Polls.

=== Exhibition games ===
The Spartans defeated Northern Michigan 94–53 in their first exhibition game on November 4, 2015. Bryn Forbes led all scorers with 23 points and Denzel Valentine notched a triple double with 14 points, 10 rebounds, and 10 assists. Though the Spartans only led 38–33 at the half, they pulled away in the second for an easy victory.

In the final exhibition game on November 9, the Spartans rolled over Ferris State 93–57. Forbes again led all scorers with 16 points and Valentine added 15 points, seven rebounds, and seven assists. Freshman guard Matt McQuaid added nine points and eight assists.

== Regular season ==
=== Non-conference regular season ===
==== November ====
The Spartans began their season at home against Florida Atlantic on November 17, 2015. The Spartans won easily as Matt Costello led the way with 15 points. Denzel Valentine added 13 points, nine assists, and eight rebounds. Freshman Deyonta Davis also added 13 points as MSU won the game 82–55.

The Spartans next game was part of the Champions Classic in Chicago, Illinois, playing the No. 3-ranked team in the country, Kansas, on November 18. The Champions Classic, an event that features four premier college programs: Duke, Kentucky, Kansas, and Michigan State, is an annual event where the four teams alternate playing each other. In this match-up of two major college programs, Denzel Valentine led the Spartans's from an 11-point deficit in the second half to an upset of Kansas with a triple double, scoring 29 points with 12 rebounds and 12 assists. It was only the 13th triple double in Spartan history and Valentine's first. Bryn Forbes added 13 points and freshman Matt McQuaid added 9 points on three of three shooting from behind the arc. MSU pulled out the win, 79–73 win.

MSU followed this impressive neutral court win with a home court rout of Arkansas–Pine Bluff, 92–46, on November 20. Javon Bess led the Spartans with 16 points while Valentine chipped in 11 assists. On November 23, as the Spartans moved up to No. 3 in boll polls, they routed Eastern Michigan, 89–65. Davis led Spartan scorers with 16 points, while Costello notched 10 rebounds, and Valentine dished out seven assists.

The Spartans then traveled to Fullerton, California, to participate in the DirecTV Wooden Legacy. In the first game of the tournament on Thanksgiving, a blowout of Boston College, Valentine repeated his performance against Kansas, notching a triple double again (29 points, 11 rebounds, and 10 assists). The win marked Tom Izzo's 500th career win, all with Michigan State. The semifinals of the Wooden Legacy saw the Spartans facing Boise State on November 27 for a chance to play in the championship game. The Spartans prevailed again for their sixth straight win to open the season. Valentine scored a career-high 32 points with nine rebounds and six assists as the Spartans won 77–67. In the championship game held in the Honda Center, in Anaheim, California, on November 29, the Spartans faced Providence, led by player of the year candidate, Kris Dunn. Former Spartans Magic Johnson and Branden Dawson were in attendance, as was Chris Paul. Bryn Forbes led the Spartans with 18 points. Valentine added 17 as MSU outlasted Providence 77–64. The Spartans finished the month of November 7–0.

==== December ====
On December 2, the Wooden Award Watch List was released listing the top 50 players to be considered for the player of the year. Denzel Valentine was included on the list.

The Spartans returned home to open December by facing No. 24 ranked Louisville in the ACC-Big Ten Challenge on December 2. Louisville mixed defenses, going from man-to-man to zone, sometimes in the same possession, to take an early lead against MSU. The Spartans again rallied from behind, led by Valentine and Forbes, to beat Louisville 71–67. Forbes totaled 20 points while Valentine had 25. Following the win over Louisville and losses by No. 2 Maryland and No. 1 North Carolina, MSU hosted Binghamton with a chance to claim the No. 1 ranking in both polls. The Spartans demolished Binghamton 76–33. The Spartans held Binghamton to 12 points in the first half and started the game with an impressive display of passing which led to a dunk by Valentine. Valentine himself outscored Binghamton in the first half 13–12. At 9–0, the Spartans were off to their second best start in school history with the No. 1 ranking on the way. When the polls were released on December 7, the Spartans were ranked No. 1 in both polls for only the fourth time in school history.

As the newly minted No. 1 team, the Spartans continued their impressive start by routing Maryland–Eastern Shore, 78–35 on December 9 in East Lansing. On December 12, Florida traveled to East Lansing to face the Spartans. Michigan State took advantage of the match-up to celebrate the 15th anniversary of their 2000 National Championship which they had won against Florida. The Spartans encountered stiff competition from Florida, but prevailed again, winning 58–52, their lowest scoring output of the season. Valentine again led the way for the Spartans, totaling 17 points. The school also celebrated the Big Ten champion football team at half time. They followed the victory with a rout of Northeastern a week later. The win made the Spartans 12–0, matching the best start in school history.

On December 20, Denzel Valentine suffered a knee injury in practice. The injury required surgery to repair torn cartilage the next day and Valentine was expected to miss two to three weeks of games, likely missing games against Oakland, Iowa, Minnesota, Illinois, and, perhaps, Penn State. Though characterized as minor, the injury was expected to have a great effect on the Spartans as Valentine led the team in scoring, rebounds, and assists. Eron Harris would replace Valentine in the starting lineup and be counted on to step up his production in Valentine's absence. Two days later, the Spartans faced Oakland in Auburn Hills. The Spartans trailed Oakland by as many as 15 and trailed by 13 at the half. The Spartans rallied in the second half to take the lead, but were forced to go to overtime to get the win, outlasting Oakland 99–93. Bryn Forbes led the way for the Spartans without Valentine, scoring 32 points and Eron Harris added 27. The win set the record for best start to a season for Michigan State at 13–0 and marked an undefeated non-conference schedule.

On December 28, Tom Izzo's father, Carl, died at the age of 90. Carl and Izzo's mother, Dorothy, were common faces around the Michigan State program. They each accompanied him on NCAA tournament trips over the years.

=== Big Ten regular season ===
==== December ====
The Spartans started the Big Ten regular season still without Valentine on December 29 by visiting Iowa. Iowa controlled the game from the start, limiting Forbes to 3 points and winning by 13, 83–70. Iowa led by as many as 19 points during the game and the Spartans never closed to within 10 in the second half. Izzo characterized the game not as "a disappointing loss. I thought it was a disappointing effort." As a result of the win over the top-ranked Spartans, Iowa fans stormed the court despite having chanted "overrated" before the end of the game. The Spartans closed 2015 with their first loss of the season, falling to 13–1 and 0–1 in conference play.

==== January ====
After the loss to the Hawkeyes, the Spartans flew to Texas to watch the Spartan football team take on Alabama in the College Football Playoff. While in Texas, they practiced in freshman Matt McQuaid's high school gym. Following the football game, they flew to Minneapolis, Minnesota to open 2016 by taking on Minnesota on January 2. In Minneapolis, the Spartans rebounded from their first loss of the season by defeating a game Minnesota squad 69–61. Forbes led the way for the Spartans scoring 20 points and Matt Costello added 17. Following the game, Valentine presented Izzo with a game ball in remembrance of his father's death. Izzo attended the funeral of his father the next day.

On January 7, Michigan State returned home for their first home game in 25 days to face Illinois. Denzel Valentine was medically cleared to play for the game, but Izzo held him out of the game. The Spartans did not need him as they romped over a short-handed Illinois team, 79–52. MSU led by as many as 30 points. Forbes led all scorers with 17 and McQuaid set a career high with 10 points. The win moved the Spartans to 15–1 overall and 2–1 in the Big Ten.

On January 11, MSU traveled to Penn State. Valentine was available to play, but did not start. He came off the bench and had a rough start going 0–4 from the field in the first half. Forbes led the way in the first, scoring all of his game-high 20 points in the first half, going 6–8 from beyond the arc. The Spartans led by 13 at the half and pushed the lead to as many as 31 in the second half. Valentine chipped in 10 points in the second half. The win moved the Spartans to 3–1 in conference and 16–1 overall with a rematch against Iowa looming.

Despite having Valentine back for a home game against Iowa on January 14, Michigan State once again struggled. Iowa jumped out to an early lead and dominated the Spartans in East Lansing. Bryn Forbes struggled with foul trouble and was held to a season-low 2 points. Costello led the Spartans with 15 while Valentine had 14. Iowa made nine three-pointers and were led by Peter Jok's 22 points. “It was just a flat-ass butt kicking to be honest with you,” MSU coach Tom Izzo said. The Spartans, undefeated against every team not named Iowa, fell to 3–2 in conference play and 16–2 overall.

The Spartans next traveled to Madison, Wisconsin on January 17 to face the struggling Wisconsin Badgers. Prior to the game, Michigan State announced that Tum Tum Nairn would be sidelined indefinitely with plantar fasciitis. Izzo used a completely new lineup to start, with freshmen Deyonta Davis and McQuaid starting as well as Harris. The lineup made little difference as the Spartans trailed by five at half. Despite Michigan State playing better and taking the lead in the second half, Wisconsin found themselves within four points with less than a minute remaining. Bronson Koenig made a three for the Badgers which was followed by a quick Spartan turnover by Harris. Down by one, the Badgers got a basket down low to take a one-point lead. The Spartans got two shots off before the clock expired, but neither fell. The Spartans lost their second consecutive game, 77–76, falling to .500 in the Big Ten at 3–3 and 16–3 overall. Costello scored a career-high 18 and Valentine led the Spartans with 23. As a result, the Spartans fell out of the top ten rankings, slipping to 10th in the Coaches Poll and 11th in the AP Poll.

On January 20, MSU took on unranked Nebraska at Breslin Center. The Cornhuskers, winners of three straight games, had beaten the Spartans in their last two meetings. MSU started off strong, going up 5–0 and leading Nebraska to call a timeout 50 seconds into the game. However, Nebraska rallied to take the lead and the teams were tied at the half. However, despite a Valentine circus shot three in the last 10 seconds and an open look for the win as the clock expired, the Spartans fell to Nebraska 72–71. Shavon Shields had 28 for the Huskers. Valentine contributed 24 for MSU. Bryn Forbes struggled again, going 1–8 with three points. He had many open looks, but could not drain a shot. The Spartans also struggled from the free throw line, going 12–21 from the line. The loss was the third straight for the Spartans, falling to 16–4 and 3–4 in conference. This marked the worst conference start for the Spartans since the 2002–03 season.

Needing a win, MSU's next game saw ESPN visit for its Gameday program on January 23. The Spartans debuted "Mean Green" uniforms for the game against Maryland. The Spartans led for a majority of the game. Forbes, mired in a three-game slump, shot the lights out, scoring 25 points. Costello also had a big game, scoring 15 points, racking up 12 rebounds, three blocks, and two steals. Valentine added 24 points, just missing his third triple double with 14 rebounds and eight assists. Maryland was led by Melo Trimble, who scored 24 points but was limited to three assists with good defense by Harris. The Spartans pulled away for the much needed victory, pulling out a 74–65 win. Izzo commented on his team's effort as "the hardest we played in years." The Spartans moved to 17–4 overall and 4–4 in conference.

The Spartans next traveled to Evanston, Illinois, to take on Northwestern on January 28. The Spartans set a season high for made three-pointers with 16 in routing the Wildcats, 76–45. Valentine led all scorers with 19. McQuaid set a new career high with 17 points. The Spartans held Northwestern to a 20.7% shooting percentage from the field. Deyonta Davis continued to improve his game, setting an MSU freshmen-high for blocks with six, a career-high 11 rebounds, and added eight points. Notably, Tom Izzo moved into second place all time for wins at a Big Ten school, breaking a tie with Gene Keady. It was Izzo's 513th win at MSU. He still trails Big Ten leader Bob Knight, who has 661. MSU's record moved to 18–4 overall and 5–4 in conference.

The Spartans returned home to end January to face last place Rutgers on January 31. The Spartans routed Rutgers on their way to tying a school record for three-point field goals made in a game, hitting 17. Forbes made six, all in the first half. Valentine also contributed six three-pointers, scoring a game-high 20. Costello notched another double double with 12 points and 13 rebounds. The Spartans finished January at 6–4 in conference and 19–4 overall.

==== February ====
The Spartans entered February with five days off before facing perhaps the most difficult stretch of the season, including a trip to Purdue and a game against Indiana in Breslin Center. The Spartans began the trip by traveling to face rival Michigan on February 6. In their only meeting of the regular season, the Spartans jumped out early on the Wolverines and never looked back. MSU led by as many as 27 on their way to an easy 89–73 win on Michigan's home floor. The Spartans kept up their hot shooting from behind the arc, shooting 63% and hitting 14 threes. Forbes hit seven of his eight three-pointers in the first half and scored 29 to lead all players. Valentine added 21 points, nine assists, and eight rebounds. The win moved the Spartans to 20–4 overall and 7–4 in conference. With a loss by Purdue later that day, the Spartans moved into a tie for fourth place in the conference.

Prior to the match-up with Purdue, Tom Izzo announced that Nairn could be out for perhaps another month with his plantar fasciitis injury. When he returns, Izzo said he would likely be only a defensive replacement and point guard relief, playing only three to eight minutes a game. Valentine was also named Big Ten player of the week for his near triple-double against Michigan, his third time being so honored this season.

On February 10, MSU traveled to West Lafayette, Indiana to face Purdue. Purdue jumped on the Spartans from the opening tip led by Raphael Davis and led by as many as 18 early in the second half. However, MSU showed toughness and fought its way back behind Valentine who again just missed a triple-double with 27 points, 10 assists and eight rebounds. The Spartans took the lead with 1:59 remaining at 72–68, but didn't score for the remainder of regulation. Purdue tied it and Valentine had a weak attempt to win it as the clock expired. In overtime with the teams tied at 81, a controversial foul call on Valentine with 4.9 seconds remaining gave Raphael Davis two free throws for the win. He made the first, but missed the second. However, Purdue big man A. J. Hammons secured the rebound and the win. The win was the first by Purdue over the Spartans since 2011. The loss dropped the Spartans to 20–5 and 7–5 in conference all but assuring they would be unable to win the Big Ten regular season championship.

On February 12, Izzo was announced as one of 14 finalists for the Naismith Memorial Basketball Hall of Fame.

On February 14, first-place Indiana paid a trip to Breslin Center. Indiana led for a good portion of the first half, but MSU rebounded to take a one-point lead at the half, 41–40. In the second half, the Spartans took control of the game behind Valentine's 30 points and career-high 13 assists. MSU led by as many as 22 and came away with the win, 88–69. Costello had a career-high 22 points and Forbes added 14. Surprisingly, Nairn made an appearance and played less than three minutes in the game. Kenny Goins, who had played a major role for the Spartans front line in the last few games, left the game in the first half with a knee injury and it was revealed after that he would miss two to four weeks. The win put MSU at 8–5 in conference and 21–5 overall while temporarily dropping Indiana out of first place.

On February 15, Valentine was named Big Ten Player of the Week for the second consecutive week and fourth time overall. On February 16, Valentine was named Naismith Trophy Player of the Week.

Wisconsin brought its seven-game win streak to Breslin Center on February 18. MSU took the lead early on a 14–3 run and never looked back, winning 69–57. Valentine scored 24 points with seven rebounds and 10 assists. The output gave Valentine at least 20 points and 10 or more assists in three consecutive games, the most in the Big Ten in 20 years. Davis led the way with defense on Wisconsin's Nigel Hayes who lit up the Spartans in their first meeting, holding Hayes to 1–13 from the floor as the Izzone mercilessly chanted, "Nigel! Nigel! Nigel!" Forbes added 17 points and Harris added 10. The win jumped the Spartans from eighth place in the conference to a four-way tie for fourth place with a record of 9–5 and 22–5 overall.

On February 24, MSU visited Ohio State, owners of a four-game winning streak. The Spartans started slow, but still led 36–31 at the half. Forbes got hot in the second half, hitting seven of 10 three-pointers in the game, for 20 points in the second half. Valentine added 17 points, eight assists, and five rebounds as MSU pulled away to win 81–62. The Spartans moved into sole possession of fourth place in the Big Ten at 11–5 and 23–5 overall. In the win, Valentine passed Draymond Green for 17th all time in scoring at Michigan State.

On February 28, Penn State, winners of three straight games and four of their last five (with wins over then-No. 4 Iowa and then-No. 22 Indiana), visited the Breslin Center. MSU started slow, beginning three of 15 from the field, but were still up 28–9 at one point and, with almost five minutes left in the first half, PSU head coach Pat Chambers was ejected from the game with a double technical. The Spartans led 52–27 at the half and never looked back leading by as many as 35. Valentine had 19 points, eight rebounds, and six assists. Davis and Forbes added 15 points each and Costello added 10 points and 11 rebounds. MSU moved into a four-way tie for second in the conference with the win and moved their record to 12–5 and 24–5 overall.

==== March ====
With two games remaining in the regular season, MSU would be guaranteed at least a double bye in the Big Ten tournament with wins in those two games, at Rutgers and home versus Ohio State. With Indiana's win over Iowa (clinching the sole Big Ten title), MSU was guaranteed the No. 2 seed in the conference tournament with wins in its last two games.

On March 2, MSU visited Rutgers looking to strengthen its hold on the No. 2 seed in the Big Ten tournament. However, MSU got off to a slow start and trailed for portions of the first half. However, Forbes got hot from the three-point line late in the half, making five including one with less than 10 seconds remaining in the half. As a result, MSU led by one at the half. In the second half, MSU ran away with the game, led by Forbes. His Big Ten single-game record of 11 three-point field goals (his only baskets of the game) helped MSU to a 31-point blowout. Izzo was disappointed with the performance in the first half. The Spartans moved to 25–5 overall and 12–5 in conference with one game remaining in the regular season.

On March 4, Izzo was named one of 12 semifinalists for the Naismith Trophy Men's Coach of the Year.

On Senior Day at Breslin Center, March 5, the Buckeyes looked for revenge for their home loss to the Spartans the prior weekend. Ohio State started off well and led for portions of the first half, but MSU took a 47–37 lead to the half. In the second half, MSU ran away with it, shooting 66.7% from the field in the game. Senior Denzel Valentine led the way with 27 points and 13 assists. The Spartans finished with 91–76 victory to clinch the No. 2 seed in the Big Ten tournament. MSU finished the regular season with a 26–5 overall record and 13–5 in conference, good enough for second place in the Big Ten. The 26 wins tied the most for a Michigan State team in the regular season. The team still had the opportunity, with postseason victories, to earn the most wins ever for a Michigan State basketball team in a season.

On March 8, USA Today named Valentine National Player of the Year over Oklahoma's Buddy Hield. The Big Ten also announced that Valentine was the Big Ten's Player of the Year. Forbes was named Second Team All-Big Ten and Costello was voted second team by the media and third team by the coaches. Valentine was the fifth player under Izzo and eighth in Michigan State history to be named Big Ten Player of the Year. On March 9, NBCSports.com named Valentine National Player of the Year and First Team All-American. On March 9, Valentine was named to the Sporting News All-American Team.

=== Big Ten tournament ===
In the quarterfinals of the Big Ten tournament, MSU faced Ohio State for the third time in 18 days. And, like the prior two games, MSU blew out OSU, winning 81–54. Valentine led the way with 19 points, 9 rebounds, and 8 assists. The win moved MSU to 27–5 overall as they moved on to the semifinals vs. Maryland.

In the semifinals, MSU faced Maryland for the second time this season. The game was close throughout and offense was hard to come by in the second half. But, MSU was able to hold off Maryland to win 64–61. Valentine led the Spartans with 18 points, 7 rebounds and 10 assists. The Spartans moved to 28–5 overall and to the Big Ten Championship against Purdue.

In the Big Ten Championship, MSU took an early lead at halftime and led by as many as 13 in the second half. However, Purdue came back to keep it close, but MSU again pulled out a close game, winning 66–62. With the win, MSU set the record for most Big Ten tournament Championships with five (Ohio State has also won five, but one has been vacated due to NCAA violations). Valentine again led the way with 15 points, 10 rebounds, and nine assists. Costello also set MSU's career block record, passing Branden Dawson, with 145. MSU's record moved to 29–5 and, presumed by many analysts, to a No. 1 seed in the NCAA tournament.

=== NCAA tournament ===
Following the Big Ten Championship, MSU learned that it would not receive a No. 1 seed, instead receiving a No. 2 seed in the Midwest bracket. This marked the 19th consecutive year the Spartans have made the NCAA Tournament. Despite receiving the No. 2 seed, MSU was considered by many the favorite to win the NCAA Championship.

Michigan State faced off against No. 15-seeded Middle Tennessee in the First Round of the NCAA Tournament on March 18. Middle Tennessee led throughout the game and withstood every run made by the Spartans. MSU could not overcome the Blue Raiders and were upset by a score of 90–81. Costello led the Spartans with 22 points in his final MSU game. Valentine, disappointed in his performance, had 13 points and 12 assists. Costello, Forbes, and Valentine ended their MSU careers with what was considered at the time one of the biggest upsets in NCAA Tournament history.

== Roster ==
2015–16 Michigan State Spartans men's basketball team
Players
Coaches

| Pos. | # | Name | Height | Weight | Year | Previous school | Hometown |
|---|---|---|---|---|---|---|---|
| G | 0 | Kyle Ahrens | 6 ft 5 in (1.96 m) | 210 lb (95 kg) | Fr | Versailles H.S. | Versailles, OH |
| F | 2 | Javon Bess | 6 ft 5 in (1.96 m) | 220 lb (100 kg) | So | Lincoln H.S. | Gahanna, OH |
| F | 15 | Marvin Clark, Jr. | 6 ft 6 in (1.98 m) | 230 lb (104 kg) | So | Sunrise Christian Academy | Blue Springs, MO |
| F | 10 | Matt Costello (C) | 6 ft 9 in (2.06 m) | 245 lb (111 kg) | Sr | Bay City Western H.S. | Bay City, MI |
| F | 23 | Deyonta Davis | 6 ft 10 in (2.08 m) | 240 lb (109 kg) | Fr | Lawrence North H.S. | Muskegon, MI |
| G | 3 | Alvin Ellis III | 6 ft 4 in (1.93 m) | 205 lb (93 kg) | Jr | De La Salle | Chicago, IL |
| G | 5 | Bryn Forbes | 6 ft 3 in (1.91 m) | 190 lb (86 kg) | Sr | Sexton H.S./Cleveland State | Lansing, MI |
| G | 13 | Connor George (W) | 6 ft 3 in (1.91 m) | 190 lb (86 kg) | Fr | Okemos H.S. | Okemos, MI |
| F | 25 | Kenny Goins | 6 ft 6 in (1.98 m) | 225 lb (102 kg) | So | Warren Mott H.S. | Troy, MI |
| G | 14 | Eron Harris | 6 ft 3 in (1.91 m) | 185 lb (84 kg) | RS Jr | Lawrence North H.S./West Virginia | Indianapolis, IN |
| G | 20 | Matt McQuaid | 6 ft 5 in (1.96 m) | 190 lb (86 kg) | Fr | Duncanville H.S. | Duncanville, TX |
| G | 11 | Lourawls Nairn, Jr. (C) | 5 ft 10 in (1.78 m) | 175 lb (79 kg) | So | Sunrise Christian Academy | Nassau, Bahamas |
| F | 34 | Gavin Schilling | 6 ft 9 in (2.06 m) | 250 lb (113 kg) | Jr | Findlay Prep | Chicago, IL |
| G | 45 | Denzel Valentine (C) | 6 ft 5 in (1.96 m) | 220 lb (100 kg) | Sr | Sexton H.S. | Lansing, MI |
| F | 30 | Matt Van Dyk (W) | 6 ft 5 in (1.96 m) | 210 lb (95 kg) | RS Jr | Imlay City | Imlay City, MI |
| G | 41 | Colby Wollenman (W) | 6 ft 7 in (2.01 m) | 230 lb (104 kg) | RS Sr | Big Horn H.S. | Big Horn, WY |

Head coach

- Tom Izzo (Northern Michigan)

Assistant coach(es)

- Dwayne Stephens (Michigan State)
- Dane Fife (Indiana)
- Mike Garland (Northern Michigan)

Legend

- (C) Team captain
- (S) Suspended
- (I) Ineligible
- (W) Walk-on
- Injured
- Current redshirt

Roster

=== Depth chart ===
| Pos. | Starting 5 | Bench 1 | Bench 2 |
|---|---|---|---|
| C | Matt Costello | Gavin Schilling | Colbey Wollenman |
| PF | Deyonta Davis | Marvin Clark, Jr. | Kenny Goins |
| SF | Eron Harris | | Javon Bess |
| SG | Bryn Forbes | Alvin Ellis III |
| PG | Denzel Valentine | Matt McQuaid | Lourawls Nairn, Jr. |

== Schedule and results ==
| Date time, TV | Rank^{#} | Opponent^{#} | Result | Record | High points | High rebounds | High assists | Site (attendance) city, state |
European summer exhibition
| Aug 25, 2015*; 12:00 pm | | vs. Basket Ferentino | W 98–54 | | 18 – Forbes | – | – | Florence, Italy |
| Aug 28, 2015*; 12:00 pm | | vs. Russian Senior National Team | L 75–93 | | 21 – Valentine | – | – | PalaTrieste; Trieste, Italy |
| Aug 29, 2015*; 12:00 pm | | vs. Italian National Team | L 69–90 | | 23 – Valentine | 8 – Schilling | 5 – Valentine | PalaTrieste; Trieste, Italy |
| Aug 30, 2015*; 12:00 pm | | vs. Georgian National Team | L 70–71 | | 17 – Schilling | – | – | Florence, Italy |
Exhibition
| Nov 4, 2015*; 7:00 pm | No. 13 | Northern Michigan | W 94–53 | | 23 – Forbes | 10 – Valentine | 10 – Valentine | Breslin Center (14,797); East Lansing, MI |
| Nov 9, 2015*; 7:00 pm | No. 13 | Ferris State | W 93–57 | | 16 – Forbes | 7 – Valentine | 8 – McQuaid | Breslin Center (14,797); East Lansing, MI |
Non-conference regular season
| Nov 13, 2015*; 7:00 pm, ESPN3 | No. 13 | Florida Atlantic | W 82–55 | 1–0 | 15 – Costello | 11 – Davis | 9 – Valentine | Breslin Center (14,797); East Lansing, MI |
| Nov 17, 2015*; 10:00 pm, ESPN | No. 13 | vs. No. 4 Kansas; Champions Classic | W 79–73 | 2–0 | 29 – Valentine | 12 – Valentine | 12 – Valentine | United Center (21,461); Chicago, IL |
| Nov 20, 2015*; 7:00 pm, ESPN3 | No. 13 | Arkansas–Pine Bluff | W 92–46 | 3–0 | 16 – Bess | 10 – Costello | 11 – Valentine | Breslin Center (14,797); East Lansing, MI |
| Nov 23, 2015*; 7:00 pm, BTN | No. 3 | Eastern Michigan | W 89–65 | 4–0 | 16 – Davis | 10 – Costello | 7 – Valentine | Breslin Center (14,797); East Lansing, MI |
| Nov 26, 2015*; 6:30 pm, ESPN2 | No. 3 | vs. Boston College; Wooden Legacy quarterfinals | W 99–68 | 5–0 | 29 – Valentine | 11 – Valentine | 10 – Valentine | Titan Gym (2,341); Fullerton, CA |
| Nov 27, 2015*; 5:30 pm, ESPN2 | No. 3 | vs. Boise State; Wooden Legacy semifinals | W 77–67 | 6–0 | 32 – Valentine | 9 – Tied | 7 – Nairn, Jr. | Titan Gym (3,173); Fullerton, CA |
| Nov 29, 2015*; 10:00 pm, ESPN2 | No. 3 | vs. Providence; Wooden Legacy championship | W 77–64 | 7–0 | 18 – Forbes | 6 – Tied | 5 – Valentine | Honda Center (4,393); Anaheim, CA |
| Dec 2, 2015*; 7:15 pm, ESPN | No. 3 | No. 24 Louisville; ACC–Big Ten Challenge | W 71–67 | 8–0 | 25 – Valentine | 13 – Goins | 7 – Valentine | Breslin Center (14,797); East Lansing, MI |
| Dec 5, 2015*; 12:00 pm, ESPNU | No. 3 | Binghamton | W 76–33 | 9–0 | 14 – Forbes | 7 – Nairn, Jr. | 12 – Valentine | Breslin Center (14,797); East Lansing, MI |
| Dec 9, 2015*; 7:00 pm, BTN | No. 1 | Maryland Eastern Shore | W 78–35 | 10–0 | 14 – Forbes | 10 – Valentine | 6 – Valentine | Breslin Center (14,797); East Lansing, MI |
| Dec 12, 2015*; 6:00 pm, ESPN2 | No. 1 | Florida | W 58–52 | 11–0 | 17 – Valentine | 6 – Tied | 5 – Nairn, Jr. | Breslin Center (14,797); East Lansing, MI |
| Dec 19, 2015*; 12:30 pm, NBCSN | No. 1 | at Northeastern | W 78–58 | 12–0 | 17 – Valentine | 5 – Tied | 6 – Valentine | Matthews Arena (5,288); Boston, MA |
| Dec 22, 2015*; 7:00 pm, ESPNU | No. 1 | vs. Oakland; Auburn Hills Showcase | W 99–93 ^{OT} | 13–0 | 32 – Forbes | 11 – Costello | 5 – Harris | The Palace (20,228); Auburn Hills, MI |
Big Ten regular season
| Dec 29, 2015; 9:00 pm, BTN | No. 1 | at Iowa | L 70–83 | 13–1 (0–1) | 21 – Harris | 7 – Costello | 3 – Nairn, Jr. | Carver–Hawkeye Arena (15,400); Iowa City, IA |
| Jan 2, 2016; 3:00 pm, ESPN2 | No. 1 | at Minnesota | W 69–61 | 14–1 (1–1) | 20 – Forbes | 15 – Costello | 7 – Nairn, Jr | Williams Arena (12,836); Minneapolis, MN |
| Jan 7, 2016; 9:00 pm, ESPN | No. 5 | Illinois | W 79–54 | 15–1 (2–1) | 17 – Forbes | 14 – Costello | 6 – Nairn, Jr. | Breslin Center (14,797); East Lansing, MI |
| Jan 10, 2016; 12:00 pm, BTN | No. 5 | at Penn State | W 92–65 | 16–1 (3–1) | 20 – Forbes | 9 – Costello | 5 – Nairn, Jr. | Bryce Jordan Center (10,855); University Park, PA |
| Jan 14, 2016; 7:00 pm, ESPN | No. 4 | No. 16 Iowa | L 59–76 | 16–2 (3–2) | 15 – Costello | 9 – Costello | 5 – Valentine | Breslin Center (14,797); East Lansing, MI |
| Jan 17, 2016; 1:30 pm, CBS | No. 4 | at Wisconsin | L 76–77 | 16–3 (3–3) | 23 – Valentine | 13 – Costello | 5 – Valentine | Kohl Center (17,287); Madison, WI |
| Jan 20, 2016; 6:30 pm, BTN | No. 11 | Nebraska | L 71–72 | 16–4 (3–4) | 14 – Valentine | 10 – Costello | 6 – Valentine | Breslin Center (14,797); East Lansing, MI |
| Jan 23, 2016; 6:30 pm, ESPN | No. 11 | No. 7 Maryland; ESPN College GameDay | W 74–65 | 17–4 (4–4) | 25 – Forbes | 14 – Valentine | 8 – Valentine | Breslin Center (14,797); East Lansing, MI |
| Jan 28, 2016; 9:00 pm, ESPN | No. 12 | at Northwestern | W 76–45 | 18–4 (5–4) | 19 – Valentine | 11 – Davis | 7 – Valentine | Welsh-Ryan Arena (8,117); Evanston, IL |
| Jan 31, 2016; 5:15 pm, BTN | No. 12 | Rutgers | W 96–62 | 19–4 (6–4) | 20 – Valentine | 13 – Costello | 6 – Valentine | Breslin Center (14,797); East Lansing, MI |
| Feb 6, 2016; 2:00 pm, CBS | No. 10 | at Michigan; Rivalry | W 89–73 | 20–4 (7–4) | 29 – Forbes | 9 – Valentine | 8 – Valentine | Crisler Center (12,707); Ann Arbor, MI |
| Feb 9, 2016; 7:00 pm, ESPN | No. 8 | at No. 18 Purdue | L 81–82 ^{OT} | 20–5 (7–5) | 27 – Valentine | 9 – Goins | 10 – Valentine | Mackey Arena (14,846); West Lafayette, IN |
| Feb 14, 2016; 1:00 pm, CBS | No. 8 | Indiana | W 88–69 | 21–5 (8–5) | 30 – Valentine | 11 – Costello | 13 – Valentine | Breslin Center (14,797); East Lansing, MI |
| Feb 18, 2016; 9:00 pm, ESPN | No. 8 | Wisconsin | W 69–57 | 22–5 (9–5) | 24 – Valentine | 9 – Davis | 10 – Valentine | Breslin Center (14,797); East Lansing, MI |
| Feb 23, 2016; 9:00 pm, ESPN | No. 6 | at Ohio State | W 81–62 | 23–5 (10–5) | 27 – Forbes | 6 – Costello | 8 – Valentine | Value City Arena (14,257); Columbus, OH |
| Feb 28, 2016; 12:00 pm, BTN | No. 6 | Penn State | W 88–57 | 24–5 (11–5) | 19 – Valentine | 10 – Costello | 6 – Valentine | Breslin Center (14,797); East Lansing, MI |
| Mar 2, 2016; 7:00 pm, BTN | No. 2 | at Rutgers | W 97–66 | 25–5 (12–5) | 33 – Forbes | 15 – Costello | 8 – Valentine | Louis Brown Athletic Center (5,561); Piscataway, NJ |
| Mar 5, 2016; 12:00 pm, ESPN | No. 2 | Ohio State | W 91–76 | 26–5 (13–5) | 27 – Valentine | 11 – Costello | 14 – Valentine | Breslin Center (14,797); East Lansing, MI |
Big Ten tournament
| Mar 11, 2016; 6:30 pm, BTN | (2) No. 2 | vs. (7) Ohio State; Quarterfinals | W 81–54 | 27–5 | 19 – Valentine | 9 – Valentine | 8 – Valentine | Bankers Life Fieldhouse (15,942); Indianapolis, IN |
| Mar 12, 2016; 3:30 pm, CBS | (2) No. 2 | vs. (3) No. 18 Maryland; Semifinals | W 64–61 | 28–5 | 18 – Valentine | 7 – Valentine | 10 – Valentine | Bankers Life Fieldhouse (18,339); Indianapolis, IN |
| Mar 13, 2016; 3:00 pm, CBS | (2) No. 2 | vs. (4) No. 13 Purdue; Championship | W 66–62 | 29–5 | 15 – Valentine | 10 – Valentine | 9 – Valentine | Bankers Life Fieldhouse (16,429); Indianapolis, IN |
NCAA tournament
| Mar 18, 2016*; 2:45 pm, CBS | (2 MW) No. 2 | vs. (15 MW) Middle Tennessee; First Round | L 81–90 | 29–6 | 22 – Costello | 9 – Costello | 12 – Valentine | Scottrade Center (14,250); St. Louis, MO |
*Non-conference game. ^{#}Rankings from AP Poll. (#) Tournament seedings in parentheses. MW=Midwest Region. All times are in Eastern Time.

== Player statistics ==
Individual player statistics (Final)
| | | | Minutes | | Scoring | | Total FGs | | | 3-point FGs | | | Free-Throws | | | Rebounds | | | | | | | |
| Player | GP | GS | Tot | Avg | Pts | Avg | FG | FGA | Pct | 3FG | 3FA | Pct | FT | FTA | Pct | Off | Def | Tot | Avg | A | TO | Blk | Stl |
|---|---|---|---|---|---|---|---|---|---|---|---|---|---|---|---|---|---|---|---|---|---|---|---|
| Ahrens, Kyle | 26 | 0 | 86 | 3.3 | 31 | 1.2 | 10 | 24 | .417 | 4 | 13 | .308 | 7 | 10 | .700 | 8 | 8 | 16 | 0.6 | 7 | 9 | 2 | 2 |
| Bess, Javon | 32 | 13 | 351 | 11.0 | 94 | 2.9 | 31 | 72 | .431 | 1 | 9 | .111 | 31 | 54 | .574 | 23 | 51 | 74 | 2.3 | 22 | 13 | 7 | 9 |
| Clark, Jr., Marvin | 30 | 1 | 292 | 9.7 | 116 | 3.9 | 45 | 83 | .542 | 11 | 26 | .423 | 15 | 20 | .750 | 22 | 53 | 75 | 2.5 | 10 | 19 | 11 | 8 |
| Costello, Matt | 35 | 35 | 802 | 22.9 | 374 | 10.7 | 148 | 264 | .561 | 2 | 8 | .250 | 76 | 101 | .752 | 102 | 186 | 288 | 8.2 | 46 | 38 | 42 | 23 |
| Davis, Deyonta | 35 | 16 | 650 | 18.6 | 261 | 7.5 | 119 | 199 | .598 | 0 | 0 | | 23 | 38 | .605 | 72 | 119 | 191 | 5.5 | 26 | 30 | 64 | 9 |
| Ellis, III, Alvin | 33 | 0 | 251 | 7.6 | 87 | 2.6 | 28 | 66 | .424 | 14 | 35 | .400 | 17 | 24 | .708 | 11 | 37 | 48 | 1.5 | 35 | 14 | 4 | 13 |
| Forbes, Bryn | 35 | 34 | 982 | 28.1 | 505 | 14.4 | 165 | 343 | .481 | 112 | 233 | .481 | 63 | 75 | .840 | 12 | 61 | 73 | 2.1 | 52 | 30 | 1 | 14 |
| Goins, Kenny | 26 | 0 | 266 | 10.2 | 52 | 2.0 | 20 | 29 | .690 | 0 | 0 | | 12 | 21 | .571 | 24 | 51 | 75 | 2.9 | 20 | 15 | 11 | 4 |
| Harris, Eron | 35 | 22 | 732 | 20.9 | 326 | 9.3 | 108 | 249 | .434 | 43 | 98 | .439 | 67 | 84 | .798 | 26 | 66 | 92 | 2.6 | 72 | 53 | 3 | 9 |
| McQuaid, Matt | 35 | 1 | 553 | 15.8 | 123 | 3.5 | 44 | 113 | .389 | 27 | 66 | .409 | 8 | 11 | .727 | 10 | 19 | 29 | 0.8 | 57 | 27 | 10 | 13 |
| Nairn, Jr., Lourawls | 28 | 18 | 523 | 18.7 | 79 | 2.8 | 33 | 87 | .379 | 3 | 16 | .188 | 10 | 23 | .435 | 3 | 28 | 31 | 1.1 | 92 | 26 | 1 | 8 |
| Roy, Greg | 3 | 0 | 3 | 1.0 | 0 | 0.0 | 0 | 1 | .000 | 0 | 1 | .000 | 0 | 0 | | 0 | 0 | 0 | 0.0 | 0 | 1 | 0 | 0 |
| Schilling, Gavin | 24 | 4 | 301 | 12.5 | 90 | 3.8 | 33 | 66 | .500 | 0 | 0 | | 24 | 39 | .615 | 25 | 50 | 75 | 3.1 | 15 | 21 | 8 | 8 |
| Valentine, Denzel | 31 | 30 | 1022 | 33.0 | 595 | 19.2 | 205 | 444 | .444 | 104 | 234 | .444 | 81 | 95 | .853 | 25 | 208 | 233 | 7.5 | 241 | 85 | 7 | 32 |
| Van Dyk, Matt | 21 | 0 | 49 | 2.3 | 23 | 1.1 | 7 | 14 | .500 | 0 | 0 | | 9 | 13 | .692 | 2 | 11 | 13 | 0.6 | 4 | 3 | 2 | 3 |
| Wollenman, Colby | 31 | 1 | 187 | 6.0 | 37 | 1.2 | 13 | 24 | .542 | 0 | 0 | | 11 | 15 | .733 | 18 | 32 | 50 | 0.5 | 20 | 16 | 4 | 1 |
| Team | | | | | | | | | | | | | | | | 44 | 47 | 91 | | | 14 | | |
| Total | 35 | | 7050 | | 2793 | 79.8 | 1009 | 2078 | .486 | 321 | 739 | .434 | 454 | 623 | .729 | 427 | 1027 | 1454 | 40.5 | 719 | 414 | 177 | 156 |
| Opponents | 35 | | 7050 | | 2245 | 64.1 | 774 | 2025 | .382 | 204 | 658 | .310 | 493 | 690 | .714 | 329 | 726 | 1055 | 29.3 | 377 | 333 | 115 | 187 |

Legend
| GP | Games played | GS | Games started | Avg | Average per game |
| FG | Field-goals made | FGA | Field-goal attempts | Off | Offensive rebounds |
| Def | Defensive rebounds | A | Assists | TO | Turnovers |
| Blk | Blocks | Stl | Steals | High | Team high |

== Rankings ==
Ranking movements Legend: ██ Increase in ranking ██ Decrease in ranking ( ) = First-place votes
| | Week | | | | | | | | | | | | | | | | | | | |
| Poll | Pre | 1 | 2 | 3 | 4 | 5 | 6 | 7 | 8 | 9 | 10 | 11 | 12 | 13 | 14 | 15 | 16 | 17 | 18 | Final |
|---|---|---|---|---|---|---|---|---|---|---|---|---|---|---|---|---|---|---|---|---|
| AP | 13 | 13 | 3 | 3 | 1 (62) | 1 (64) | 1 (64) | 1 (64) | 5 | 4 (1) | 11 | 12 | 10 | 8 | 8 | 6 | 2 (2) | 2 (2) | 2 (2) | Not released |
| Coaches | 13 | 13 | 4 | 3 | 1 (26) | 1 (28) | 1 (29) | 1 (27) | 5 (1) | 4 | 10 | 11 | 10 | 9 (1) | 9 | 7 | 3 (1) | 3 (1) | 2 (1) | 7 |

*AP does not release post-NCAA tournament rankings

== Awards and honors ==
Denzel Valentine

On March 20, 2016, Valentine was named one of four finalists for the Naismith Trophy. On March 29, Valentine was named NABC National Player of the Year. On March 31, Valentine became the first Michigan State player ever to be named AP National Player of the Year.

- AP Player of the Year
- NABC Player of the Year
- USA Today National Player of the Year
- Sports Illustrated National Player of the Year
- NABC First Team All American
- AP First Team All American
- CBS Sports First Team All American
- Sporting News First Team All American
- NBCSports.com National Player of the Year
- NBCSports.com First Team All American
- USBWA First All-American
- Big Ten Player of the Year
- All Big Ten First Team
- Big Ten tournament Most Outstanding Player
- USBWA District V Player of the Year

Bryn Forbes

- All Big Ten Second Team
- USBWA District V All-District Team

Matt Costello

- All Big Ten Second Team (media), All Big Ten Third Team (coaches)
