= 2015–16 Purdue Boilermakers men's basketball team =

American college basketball season

2015–16 Purdue Boilermakers men's basketball

Hall of Fame Tip Off champions

NCAA tournament, First Round
- Conference: Big Ten Conference

Ranking
- Coaches: No. 19
- AP: No. 12
- Record: 26–9 (12–6 Big Ten)
- Head coach: Matt Painter (11th season)
- Assistant coaches: Jack Owens; Brandon Brantley; Greg Gary
- Home arena: Mackey Arena

2015–16 Big Ten Conference men's basketball standings
	Conf.				Overall
Team	W		L	PCT	W		L	PCT
No. 14 Indiana	15	–	3	.833	27	–	8	.771
No. 2 Michigan State †	13	–	5	.722	29	–	6	.829
No. 18 Maryland	12	–	6	.667	27	–	9	.750
No. 12 Purdue	12	–	6	.667	26	–	9	.743
No. 25 Iowa	12	–	6	.667	22	–	11	.667
Wisconsin	12	–	6	.667	22	–	13	.629
Ohio State	11	–	7	.611	21	–	14	.600
Michigan	10	–	8	.556	23	–	13	.639
Northwestern	8	–	10	.444	20	–	12	.625
Penn State	7	–	11	.389	16	–	16	.500
Nebraska	6	–	12	.333	16	–	18	.471
Illinois	5	–	13	.278	15	–	19	.441
Minnesota	2	–	16	.111	11	–	20	.355
Rutgers	1	–	17	.056	7	–	25	.219
† 2016 Big Ten tournament winner Rankings from AP poll

The 2015–16 Purdue Boilermakers men's basketball team represented Purdue University. Their head coach was Matt Painter, in his 11th season with the Boilers. The team played its home games in Mackey Arena in West Lafayette, Indiana and were members of the Big Ten Conference. They finished the season 26–9, 12–6 in Big Ten play to finish in a four-way tie for third place. As the No. 4 seed in the Big Ten tournament, they defeated Illinois and Michigan to advance to the championship game. In a closely fought championship game, they lost to Michigan State 66–62. The Boilermakers received an at-large bid to the NCAA tournament as a No. 5 seed, their second straight trip to the Tournament. In the First Round, they were upset by No. 12-seed Little Rock 85–83 in double overtime.

== Previous season ==
The Boilermakers finished the 2014–15 season 21–13, 12–6 in Big Ten play to finish in a three-way tie for third place. As the No. 4 seed in the Big Ten tournament, they advanced to the semifinals where they lost to No. 1 seed Wisconsin. The Boilers received an at-large bid to the NCAA tournament as a No. 9 seed. They lost in the Second Round to No. 8-seeded Cincinnati.

== Departures ==
Name	Number	Pos.	Height	Weight	Year	Hometown	Notes
Jon Octeus	0	G	6'4"	175	Senior	Miramar, FL	Graduated
Bryson Scott	1	G	6'1"	201	Sophomore	Fort Wayne, IN	Transferred (IPFW)
Anfernee Brown	24	G	6'1"	190	Sophomore	East Chicago, IN	Left the team for personal reasons
Neal Beshears	30	F	6'7"	198	Senior	Winchester, IN	Graduated

=== Incoming transfers ===
Name	Number	Pos.	Height	Weight	Year	Hometown	Previous School
Johnny Hill	1	G	6'3"	180	RS Senior	Glendale Heights, IL	Elected to transfer from Texas–Arlington. Will be eligible to play immediately since Hill graduated from Texas–Arlington.

== Roster ==
2015–16 Purdue Boilermakers men's basketball team
Players
Coaches

Pos.	#	Name	Height	Weight	Year	Hometown
G	1	Johnny Hill	6 ft 3 in (1.91 m)	180 lb (82 kg)	RS Sr	Glendale Heights, IL
G	2	Jon McKeeman (W)	6 ft 1 in (1.85 m)	190 lb (86 kg)	Sr	Fort Wayne, IN
G	3	P.J. Thompson	5 ft 11 in (1.8 m)	188 lb (85 kg)	So	Indianapolis, IN
F	5	Basil Smotherman (redshirt)	6 ft 6 in (1.98 m)	222 lb (101 kg)	Jr	Indianapolis, IN
G	11	Stephen Toyra (W)	6 ft 3 in (1.91 m)	180 lb (82 kg)	Sr	Lafayette, IN
F	12	Vincent Edwards	6 ft 7 in (2.01 m)	220 lb (100 kg)	So	Middletown, OH
G	14	Ryan Cline	6 ft 5 in (1.96 m)	190 lb (86 kg)	Fr	Carmel, IN
C	20	A. J. Hammons	7 ft 0 in (2.13 m)	261 lb (118 kg)	Sr	Carmel, IN
G	21	Kendall Stephens	6 ft 6 in (1.98 m)	197 lb (89 kg)	Jr	St. Charles, IL
G	22	Grant Weatherford (redshirt)	6 ft 2 in (1.88 m)	215 lb (98 kg)	Fr	Cicero, IN
F	23	Jacquil Taylor	6 ft 9 in (2.06 m)	217 lb (98 kg)	So	Cambridge, MA
F	24	Grady Eifert (W)	6 ft 6 in (1.98 m)	215 lb (98 kg)	Fr	Fort Wayne, IN
G	31	Dakota Mathias	6 ft 4 in (1.93 m)	197 lb (89 kg)	So	Elida, OH
G	35	Raphael Davis (C)	6 ft 5 in (1.96 m)	217 lb (98 kg)	Sr	Fort Wayne, IN
C	44	Isaac Haas	7 ft 2 in (2.18 m)	297 lb (135 kg)	So	Piedmont, AL
F	50	Caleb Swanigan	6 ft 9 in (2.06 m)	260 lb (118 kg)	Fr	Fort Wayne, IN

Head coach

Matt Painter (Purdue)

Assistant coach(es)

Jack Owens (Eastern Illinois)
Greg Gary (Tulane)
Brandon Brantley (Purdue)

Legend

- (C) Team captain
- (S) Suspended
- (I) Ineligible
- (W) Walk-on
- Injured
- Current redshirt

Roster

== Class of 2015 recruits ==
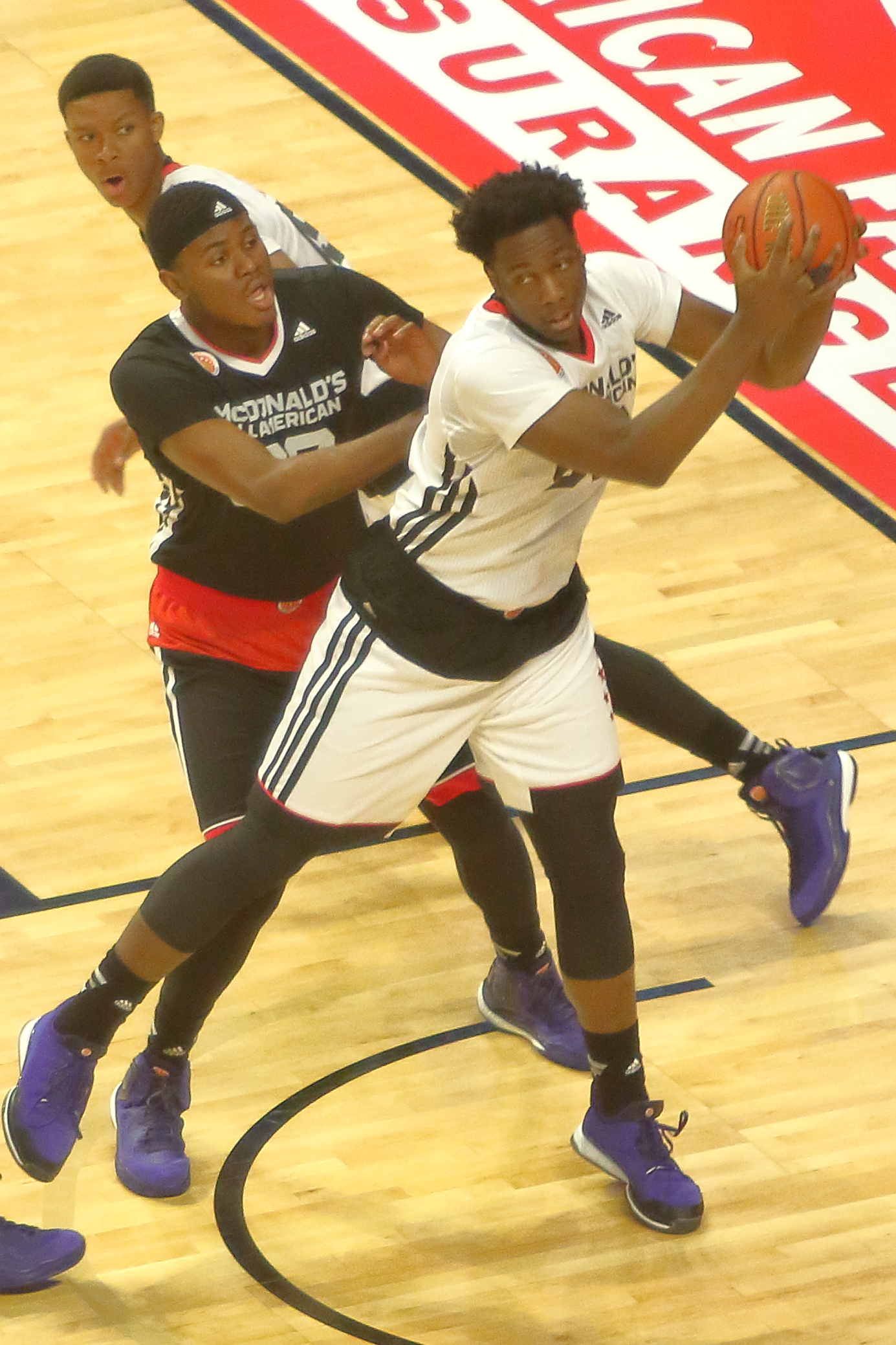
Caleb Swanigan at the 2015 McDonald's All-American Boys Game

Caleb Swanigan had multiple high caliber teams recruiting him. Swanigan verbally committed to Michigan State April 10, 2015, but decommitted from the school on May 7. Twelve days later, he committed to Purdue and was the first Indiana's Mr. Basketball recruit since Glenn Robinson. He was also Purdue's first McDonald's All-American since 1996.

Ryan Cline committed to Purdue on June 2, 2014. Cline, an Indiana native, was expected to improve Purdue's 3-point shooting. On his recruitment, Cline said, "From the first visit to (Purdue) when I saw all of their coaches there, it just blew me away," he said. "Getting to know them from that time, I knew they wanted me."

Grant Weatherford was Purdue's last commitment of this class, committing to Purdue on August 2, 2014. On Weatherford's potential impact as a freshman, Coach Painter said, "Well, he’s got to be able to get by some of those guys. Johnny Hill’s got a lot of experience. P.J. Thompson, you know, obviously played some for us last year, and both of those guys have really played well."

College recruiting information
Name	Hometown	School	Height	Weight	Commit date
Caleb Swanigan; C	Fort Wayne, IN	Homestead High School	6 ft 8 in (2.03 m)	275 lb (125 kg)	May 19, 2015
Caleb Swanigan; C	Recruit ratings: Scout: Rivals: (94)				
Ryan Cline; SG	Carmel, IN	Carmel High School	6 ft 5 in (1.96 m)	180 lb (82 kg)	Jun 2, 2014
Ryan Cline; SG	Recruit ratings: Scout: Rivals: (80)				
Grant Weatherford; PG	Cicero, IN	Hamilton Heights High School	6 ft 2 in (1.88 m)	215 lb (98 kg)	Aug 2, 2014
Grant Weatherford; PG	Recruit ratings: Scout: Rivals: (76)				
Overall recruit ranking: Rivals: 27
Note: In many cases, Scout, Rivals, 247Sports, On3, and ESPN may conflict in their listings of height and weight.; In these cases, the average was taken. ESPN grades are on a 100-point scale.; Sources: "2015 Purdue Signees". Rivals.; "2015 Purdue Signees". Scout.; "2015 Purdue Signees". ESPN.; "Scout.com Team Recruiting Rankings". Scout.; "2015 Team Ranking". Rivals.

== Schedule and results ==
Date time, TV	Rank^{#}	Opponent^{#}	Result	Record	High points	High rebounds	High assists	Site (attendance) city, state
Exhibition
Nov 8, 2015*; 5:00 pm	No. 23	Northwestern Ohio	W 92–43		18 – 2 tied	11 – Swanigan	7 – Mathias	Mackey Arena (11,695); West Lafayette, IN
Non-conference regular season
Nov 13, 2015*; 7:00 pm	No. 23	North Carolina A&T; Hall of Fame Tip Off Classic	W 81–40	1–0	14 – 2 tied	11 – Swanigan	5 – Hill	Mackey Arena (12,623); West Lafayette, IN
Nov 15, 2015*; 2:00 pm, ESPN3	No. 23	Vermont; Hall of Fame Tip Off Classic	W 107–79	2–0	17 – Mathias	13 – Swanigan	5 – Davis	Mackey Arena (12,808); West Lafayette, IN
Nov 18, 2015*; 7:00 pm, ESPN3	No. 21	Incarnate Word	W 96–61	3–0	17 – Haas	12 – Haas	5 – Mathias	Mackey Arena (11,536); West Lafayette, IN
Nov 21, 2015*; Noon, ESPN3	No. 21	vs. Old Dominion; Hall of Fame Tip Off Classic semifinals	W 61–39	4–0	18 – Hammons	8 – Haas	2 – 3 tied	Mohegan Sun Arena; Uncasville, CT
Nov 22, 2015*; 5:00 pm, ESPN2	No. 21	vs. Florida; Hall of Fame Tip Off Classic championship game	W 85–70	5–0	18 – Davis	7 – Hammons	4 – Thompson	Mohegan Sun Arena (3,813); Uncasville, CT
Nov 28, 2015*; 7:00 pm, ESPN3	No. 16	Lehigh	W 77–55	6–0	24 – Haas	12 – Swanigan	7 – Edwards	Mackey Arena (12,660); West Lafayette, IN
Dec 1, 2015*; 9:00 pm, ESPN2	No. 11	at Pittsburgh; ACC–Big Ten Challenge	W 72–59	7–0	24 – Hammons	12 – Hammons	6 – Edwards	Peterson Events Center (9,439); Pittsburgh, PA
Dec 5, 2015*; 2:15 pm, BTN	No. 11	New Mexico	W 70–58	8–0	21 – Haas	11 – Hammons	4 – 2 tied	Mackey Arena (14,221); West Lafayette, IN
Dec 7, 2015*; 7:00 pm, ESPNU	No. 11	IUPUI	W 80–53	9–0	14 – Hammons	14 – Swanigan	4 – 2 tied	Mackey Arena (12,404); West Lafayette, IN
Dec 9, 2015*; 7:00 pm, ESPNU	No. 11	Howard	W 93–55	10–0	19 – Swanigan	12 – Swanigan	0 – Thompson	Mackey Arena (11,983); West Lafayette, IN
Dec 12, 2015*; 2:00 pm, ESPN3	No. 11	Youngstown State	W 95–64	11–0	15 – 2 tied	11 – Hammons	6 – Swanigan	Mackey Arena (14,026); West Lafayette, IN
Dec 19, 2015*; 5:00 pm, BTN	No. 9	vs. No. 17 Butler; Crossroads Classic	L 68–74	11–1	25 – Swanigan	11 – Swanigan	7 – Thompson	Bankers Life Fieldhouse (19,156); Indianapolis, IN
Dec 22, 2015*; 8:00 pm, BTN	No. 14	Vanderbilt	W 68–55	12–1	21 – Hammons	10 – Hammons	4 – Mathias	Mackey Arena (14,846); West Lafayette, IN
Big Ten regular season
Dec 29, 2015; 7:00 pm, BTN	No. 14	at Wisconsin	W 61–55	13–1 (1–0)	24 – Hammons	9 – Swanigan	4 – Thompson	Kohl Center (17,287); Madison, WI
Jan 2, 2016; 6:00 pm, BTN	No. 14	Iowa	L 63–70	13–2 (1–1)	12 – Stephens	7 – Hammons	3 – 3 tied	Mackey Arena (14,846); West Lafayette, IN
Jan 7, 2016; 7:00 pm, ESPNU	No. 20	Michigan	W 87–70	14–2 (2–1)	17 – Hammons	7 – 2 tied	6 – Davis	Mackey Arena (13,063); West Lafayette, IN
Jan 10, 2016; 6:00 pm, BTN	No. 20	at Illinois	L 70–84	14–3 (2–2)	12 – 2 tied	8 – Hammons	4 – Thompson	State Farm Center (12,246); Champaign, IL
Jan 13, 2016; 8:30 pm, BTN	No. 25	Penn State	W 74–57	15–3 (3–2)	19 – Edwards	9 – Swanigan	4 – Mathias	Mackey Arena (13,802); West Lafayette, IN
Jan 18, 2016; 7:00 pm, BTN	No. 22	at Rutgers	W 107–57	16–3 (4–2)	12 – 4 tied	13 – Swanigan	3 – 2 tied	The RAC (5,085); Piscataway, NJ
Jan 21, 2016; 9:00 pm, ESPN	No. 22	Ohio State	W 75–64	17–3 (5–2)	16 – Hammons	10 – Swanigan	3 – Mathias	Mackey Arena (14,846); West Lafayette, IN
Jan 24, 2016; 1:00 pm, BTN	No. 22	at No. 9 Iowa	L 71–83	17–4 (5–3)	19 – Edwards	8 – 2 tied	3 – 2 tied	Carver–Hawkeye Arena (15,400); Iowa City, IA
Jan 27, 2016; 9:00 pm, BTN	No. 21	at Minnesota	W 68–64	18–4 (6–3)	24 – Edwards	8 – 3 tied	4 – Edwards	Williams Arena (10,484); Minneapolis, MN
Jan 30, 2016; 4:30 pm, BTN	No. 21	Nebraska	W 89–74	19–4 (7–3)	32 – Hammons	12 – Swanigan	7 – Thompson	Mackey Arena (14,846); West Lafayette, IN
Feb 6, 2016; 4:00 pm, ESPN	No. 18	at No. 4 Maryland	L 61–72	19–5 (7–4)	18 – Hammons	10 – Hammons	7 – Edwards	Xfinity Center (17,950); College Park, MD
Feb 9, 2016; 7:00 pm, ESPN	No. 18	No. 8 Michigan State	W 82–81 ^{OT}	20–5 (8–4)	24 – Davis	13 – Hammons	3 – 3 tied	Mackey Arena (14,846); West Lafayette, IN
Feb 13, 2016; 2:00 pm, ESPN2	No. 18	at Michigan	L 56–61	20–6 (8–5)	14 – Swanigan	10 – Edwards	3 – Edwards	Crisler Arena (12,707); Ann Arbor, MI
Feb 16, 2016; 7:00 pm, BTN	No. 17	Northwestern	W 71–61	21–6 (9–5)	18 – Hammons	12 – Hammons	3 – Hill	Mackey Arena (12,868); West Lafayette, IN
Feb 20, 2016; 8:30 pm, ESPN	No. 17	at No. 22 Indiana; Rivalry/Crimson and Gold Cup	L 73–77	21–7 (9–6)	14 – Swanigan	8 – Swanigan	4 – Edwards	Assembly Hall (17,472); Bloomington, IN
Feb 27, 2016; 4:00 pm, ESPN	No. 20	No. 10 Maryland	W 83–79	22–7 (10–6)	19 – Hammons	7 – 4 tied	4 – 3 tied	Mackey Arena (14,846); West Lafayette, IN
Mar 1, 2016; 8:00 pm, BTN	No. 15	at Nebraska	W 81–62	23–7 (11–6)	20 – Edwards	6 – Davis	6 – Hill	Pinnacle Bank Arena (15,572); Lincoln, NE
Mar 6, 2016; 6:30 pm, BTN	No. 15	Wisconsin	W 91–80	24–7 (12–6)	27 – Swanigan	8 – Swanigan	5 – Edwards	Mackey Arena (14,846); West Lafayette, IN
Big Ten tournament
Mar 11, 2016; 2:30 pm, ESPN	(4) No. 13	vs. (12) Illinois; Quarterfinals	W 89–58	25–7	16 – Haas	12 – Swanigan	6 – Hill	Bankers Life Fieldhouse (18,355); Indianapolis, IN
Mar 12, 2016; 1:00 pm, CBS	(4) No. 13	vs. (8) Michigan; Semifinals	W 76–59	26–7	27 – Hammons	11 – Hammons	6 – Davis	Bankers Life Fieldhouse (18,339); Indianapolis, IN
Mar 13, 2016; 3:00 pm, CBS	(4) No. 13	vs. (2) No. 2 Michigan State; Championship	L 62–66	26–8	19 – Edwards	9 – Hammons	3 – Davis	Bankers Life Fieldhouse (16,429); Indianapolis, IN
NCAA tournament
Mar 17, 2016*; 4:20 pm, TBS	(5 MW) No. 12	vs. (12 MW) Little Rock; First Round	L 83–85 ^{2OT}	26–9	24 – Edwards	15 – Hammons	4 – Mathias	Pepsi Center (19,499); Denver, CO
*Non-conference game. ^{#}Rankings from AP Poll. (#) Tournament seedings in parentheses. MW=Midwest Region Source. All times are in Eastern Time.

== Rankings ==
Ranking movements Legend: ██ Increase in ranking ██ Decrease in ranking
	Week																				
Poll	Pre	1	2	3	4	5	6	7	8	9	10	11	12	13	14	15	16	17	18	19	Final
AP	23		21	16	11	11	9	14	14	20	24	22	21	18	18	17	20	15	13	12	N/A*
Coaches	24		23	15	11	11	8	13	14	18	24	22	21	16	16	16	19	13	13	10	19

*AP does not release post-NCAA tournament rankings

== See also ==
- 2015–16 Purdue Boilermakers women's basketball team
