= Isaiah Moss =

American basketball player (born 1996)

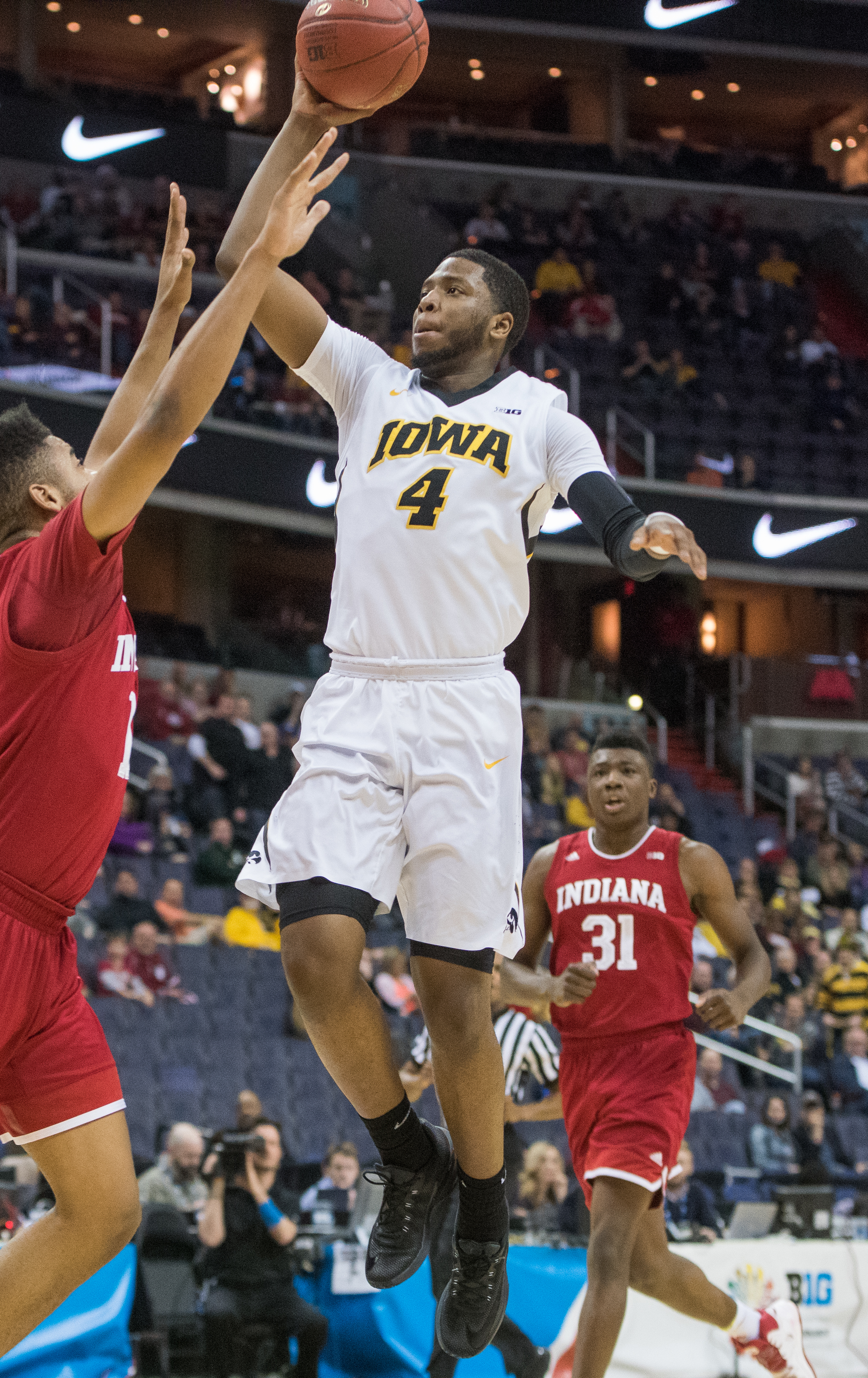
- Moss with Iowa in 2017

Personal information
- Born: October 8, 1996 (age 30)
- Listed height: 6 ft 5 in (1.96 m)
- Listed weight: 208 lb (94 kg)

Career information
- High school: Lincoln-Way East (Frankfort, Illinois); Simeon Career Academy (Chicago, Illinois)
- College: Iowa (2016–2019); Kansas (2019–2020)
- NBA draft: 2020: undrafted
- Playing career: 2021–present
- Position: Shooting guard

Career history
- 2021: Otago Nuggets
- 2021–2022: Brisbane Bullets
- 2022: Rockhampton Rockets

Isaiah Malik Moss (born October 8, 1996) is an American professional basketball player who last played for the Rockhampton Rockets of the NBL1 North. He played college basketball for Iowa and Kansas.

== Early life ==
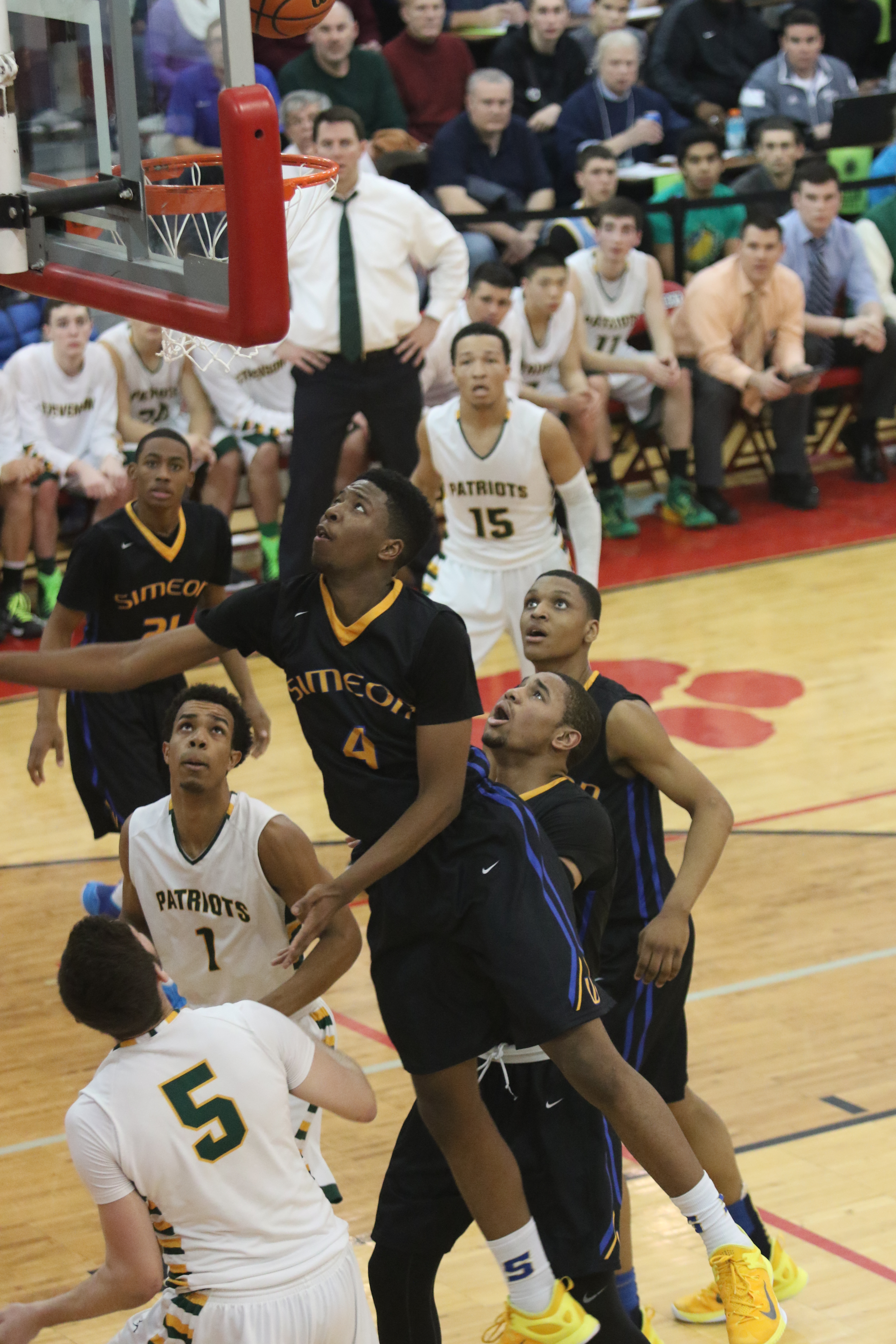
Moss at the rim for Simeon in 2015

Moss grew up in suburban Chicago and played football, basketball, and soccer. He joined his first travel basketball team in third grade. Moss attended Lincoln-Way East High School as a freshman and sophomore. He transferred to Simeon Career Academy before his junior year and paired with Zach Norvell Jr. On November 2, 2014, Moss signed with Iowa over offers from DePaul, Auburn, Pittsburgh, and Iowa State.

== College career ==
Moss redshirted his true freshman season. He averaged 6.5 points, 1.6 rebounds, and 0.9 assists per game as a redshirt freshman. On February 21, 2018, Moss scored a career-high 32 points in an 86–82 loss to Minnesota, including 19 points in 96 seconds. He averaged 11.1 points, 2.2 rebounds and 1.9 assists per game as a sophomore. Moss declared for the 2018 NBA draft but ultimately returned to Iowa. As a junior, he averaged 9.2 points, 2.9 rebounds and 1.8 assists per game. Following the season, Moss entered the transfer portal, largely due to receiving a threatening Instagram message during the NCAA Tournament. He initially committed to Arkansas, before changing his commitment to Kansas in June 2019. As a senior, Moss made nine starts and averaged 7.9 points and 2.3 rebounds per game while shooting 34.8 percent from behind the arc.

== Professional career ==
On January 20, 2021, Moss signed his first professional contract with the Otago Nuggets of the New Zealand National Basketball League. In his third game, Moss scored 33 points in a 108–96 win over the Manawatu Jets. He averaged 21.5 points and 6.1 rebounds per game.

On July 12, 2021, Moss signed with the Brisbane Bullets of the Australian National Basketball League for the 2021–22 season.

In 2022, Moss had a short stint with the Rockhampton Rockets in the NBL1 North.

== Personal life ==
Moss is the son of Angie and Mike Moss. He has two older siblings, Michael and Kela, who went on to play football and basketball collegiately. Moss's favorite player was Jabari Parker.
