= Adam Woodbury =

American basketball player (born 1994)

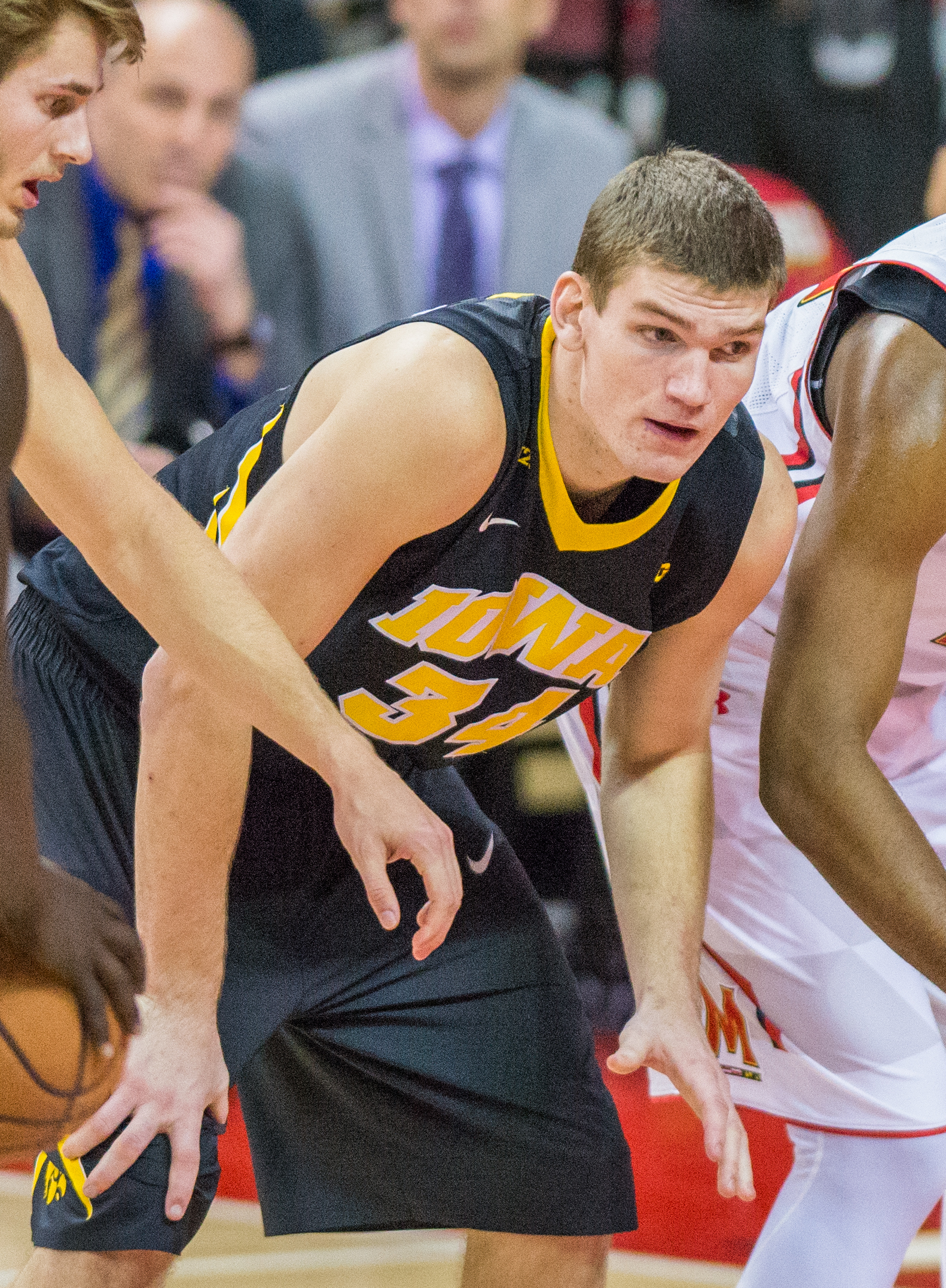

Free agent
- Position: Center

Personal information
- Born: January 13, 1994 (age 32)
- Listed height: 7 ft 1 in (2.16 m)
- Listed weight: 245 lb (111 kg)

Career information
- High school: East (Sioux City, Iowa)
- College: Iowa (2012–2016)
- NBA draft: 2016: undrafted
- Playing career: 2016–present

Career history
- 2016–2017: Fort Wayne Mad Ants
- 2017–2018: Westchester Knicks
- 2018: Stockton Kings
- 2018–2020: Grand Rapids Drive
- 2021–2022: Long Island Nets

Adam Woodbury (born January 13, 1994) is an American professional basketball player who last played for the Long Island Nets of the NBA G League. He played college basketball for the Iowa Hawkeyes.

== College career ==
Woodbury was a top-50 recruit coming out of high school. As a freshman at Iowa, he posted 4.9 points and 4.8 rebounds per game and had similar numbers as a sophomore as the Hawkeyes reached the NCAA Tournament. Woodbury averaged 6.6 points and 5.2 rebounds per game as a starter for every game except one which he let Gabriel Olaseni his backup center start. He scored a career-high 16 points in a win against Maryland on February 8, 2015. As a senior, Woodbury averaged 7.6 points and 8.3 rebounds per game. He was an All Big Ten Honorable Mention selection by the media. Woodbury hit a buzzer-beating layup to defeat Temple 72–70 in the first round of the NCAA Tournament and finished with 10 points. He finished his career with 851 points and 760 rebounds.

== Professional career ==
=== Fort Wayne Mad Ants (2016–2017) ===
After going undrafted in the 2016 NBA draft, Woodbury played for the Sacramento Kings in the NBA Summer League. Woodbury was drafted in the first round of the 2016 NBA Development League Draft by the Maine Red Claws. Alongside Omari Johnson and a 2017 first round pick, he was traded to the Fort Wayne Mad Ants in exchange for Dallas Lauderdale and Terran Petteway. On October 31, 2016, Woodbury was included in the training camp roster of the Fort Wayne Mad Ants. Iowa teammate Jarrod Uthoff joined the Mad Ants in February 2017. On October 21, 2017, Woodbury was included in training camp roster of the Fort Wayne Mad Ants.

=== Westchester Knicks (2017–2018) ===
On November 21, 2017, the Westchester Knicks announced that they had acquired Woodbury. He saw an increase in minutes in March due to Nigel Hayes being called up by the Toronto Raptors and had seven points and 11 rebounds in a loss to the Long Island Nets. Woodbury averaged 5.5 points, 5.6 rebounds, and 1.0 assists per game.

=== Stockton Kings (2018) ===
Woodbury was added to the Stockton Kings roster on November 24, 2018, as a replacement for two Kings players competing in FIBA World Cup qualifying games. Once these players returned, Woodbury was waived by the Kings.

=== Grand Rapids Drive (2018–2020) ===
On December 9, 2018, Woodbury was acquired by the Grand Rapids Drive.

=== Long Island Nets (2021–2022) ===
On October 22, 2021, the Long Island Nets announced that they had acquired the returning right of Woodbury from Grand Rapids Gold in exchange for a second-round pick in 2022 NBA G League draft. On October 25, 2021, Woodbury was included in the training camp roster of the Long Island Nets.
