= 2015–16 Western Illinois Leathernecks men's basketball team =

American college basketball season

2015–16 Western Illinois Leathernecks men's basketball
- Conference: The Summit League
- Record: 10–17 (3–13 The Summit)
- Head coach: Billy Wright (2nd season)
- Assistant coaches: Josh Wolfe; Damon James; Mark Vershaw
- Home arena: Western Hall

2015–16 Summit League men's basketball standings
	Conf.				Overall
Team	W		L	PCT	W		L	PCT
IPFW	12	–	4	.750	24	–	10	.706
South Dakota State †	12	–	4	.750	26	–	8	.765
Omaha	10	–	6	.625	18	–	14	.563
IUPUI	9	–	7	.563	13	–	19	.406
North Dakota State	8	–	8	.500	20	–	13	.606
Denver	7	–	9	.438	16	–	15	.516
Oral Roberts	6	–	10	.375	14	–	17	.452
South Dakota	5	–	11	.313	14	–	18	.438
Western Illinois	3	–	13	.188	10	–	17	.370
† 2016 Summit League Tournament winner

The 2015–16 Western Illinois Leathernecks men's basketball team represented Western Illinois University during the 2015–16 NCAA Division I men's basketball season. The Leathernecks, led by second year head coach Billy Wright, played their home games at Western Hall and were members of The Summit League. They finished the season 10–17, 3–13 in Summit League play to finish in last place. They failed to qualify for The Summit League tournament.

== Roster ==
Number	Name	Position	Height	Weight	Year	Hometown
1	Jabari Sandifer	Guard	6–1	170	Junior	Naperville, Illinois
10	Jamie Batish	Guard	6–4	190	Senior	Melbourne, Australia
11	De'Andgelo "Delo" Bruster	Guard	5–11	170	Freshman	Overland Park, Kansas
12	DeVante Mayes	Guard	6–0	160	Sophomore	Peoria, Illinois
14	J. C. Fuller	Guard	6–3	180	Senior	Sioux City, Iowa
15	Dalan Ancrum	Guard/Forward	6–5	175	Sophomore	Round Rock, Texas
22	Jalen Morgan	Forward	6–8	202	RS–Freshman	Indianapolis, Indiana
24	James Claar	Forward	6–8	210	Freshman	Bolingbrook, Illinois
25	Noah Wells	Guard	6–2	175	Freshman	Champaign, Illinois
30	Mike Miklusak	Forward	6–6	190	Junior	Dyer, Indiana
31	Garret Covington	Forward	6–5	180	Junior	Edwardsville, Illinois
32	Tate Stensgaard	Forward	6–8	190	Senior	Rapid City, South Dakota
33	Jalen Chapman	Forward	6–8	220	Senior	The Bronx, New York
34	Ryan Maas	Guard	6–1	170	Freshman	Pekin, Illinois
44	Jordan Hughes	Center	6–10	235	Freshman	Schaumburg, Illinois
52	Brandon Gilbeck	Center	6–11	245	Freshman	Spring Green, Wisconsin

== Schedule ==
Date time, TV	Opponent	Result	Record	Site (attendance) city, state
Exhibition
11/07/2015*	Knox	W 90–48		Western Hall; Macomb, IL
Regular season
11/13/2015*; 8:00 pm, BTN	at No. 17 Wisconsin	W 69–67	1–0	Kohl Center (17,287); Madison, WI
11/15/2015*; 5:00 pm	Hannibal–LaGrange	W 94–57	2–0	Western Hall (1,065); Macomb, IL
11/17/2015*; 7:00 pm	UIC	W 84–57	3–0	Western Hall (1,106); Macomb, IL
11/21/2015*; 7:00 pm	at Eastern Illinois	W 83–63	4–0	Lantz Arena (869); Charleston, IL
11/25/2015*; 2:00 pm	Trinity Christian	W 79–44	5–0	Western Hall (815); Macomb, IL
11/28/2015*; 7:00 pm, FS2	at Creighton	L 67–97	5–1	CenturyLink Center Omaha (16,118); Omaha, NE
12/02/2015*; 7:00 pm	Silver Lake	W 84–49	6–1	Western Hall (1,037); Macomb, IL
12/07/2015*; 6:00 pm, BTN	at Iowa	L 56–90	6–2	Carver–Hawkeye Arena (11,395); Iowa City, IA
12/12/2015*; 2:00 pm, ESPN3	Eastern Illinois	W 64–57	7–2	Western Hall (1,231); Macomb, IL
12/19/2015*; 4:30 pm	at Chicago State	L 70–77	7–3	Emil and Patricia Jones Convocation Center (1,788); Chicago, IL
12/21/2015*; 7:00 pm, ESPN3	at Loyola–Chicago	L 67–72	7–4	Joseph J. Gentile Arena (1,211); Chicago, IL
01/01/2016; 1:00 pm	at Omaha	L 80–82	7–5 (0–1)	Baxter Arena (1,576); Omaha, NE
01/03/2016; 2:00 pm, MidcoSN	at South Dakota State	L 59–63	7–6 (0–2)	Frost Arena (2,573); Brookings, SD
01/09/2016; 2:00 pm	IUPUI	L 60–67	7–7 (0–3)	Western Hall (1,002); Macomb, IL
01/14/2016; 7:00 pm	Denver	L 69–76	7–8 (0–4)	Western Hall (916); Macomb, IL
01/16/2016; 7:00 pm	Oral Roberts	L 68–77	7–9 (0–5)	Western Hall (1,077); Macomb, IL
01/20/2016; 7:00 pm	at South Dakota	L 67–76	7–10 (0–6)	DakotaDome (1,674); Vermillion, SD
01/23/2016; 2:00 pm, ESPN3	North Dakota State	L 52–65	7–11 (0–7)	Western Hall (1,301); Macomb, IL
01/29/2016; 1:00 pm, ESPN3	at IUPUI	L 67–69	7–12 (0–8)	Fairgrounds Coliseum (883); Indianapolis, IN
01/31/2016; 2:00 pm	at IPFW	L 67–88	7–13 (0–9)	Gates Sports Center (1,079); Fort Wayne, IN
02/03/2016; 7:00 pm, ESPN3	Omaha	W 83–76	8–13 (1–9)	Western Hall (922); Macomb, IL
02/11/2016; 8:00 pm	at Denver	W 63–60	9–13 (2–9)	Magness Arena (1,425); Denver, CO
02/13/2016; 7:00 pm, ESPN3	at Oral Roberts	L 66–72	9–14 (2–10)	Mabee Center (3,128); Tulsa, OK
02/17/2016; 7:00 pm	at North Dakota State	L 54–63	9–15 (2–11)	Scheels Arena (2,227); Fargo, ND
02/20/2016; 2:00 pm, ESPN3	South Dakota State	L 67–87	9–16 (2–12)	Western Hall (1,166); Macomb, IL
02/25/2016; 8:00 pm, ESPN3	IPFW	L 75–87	9–17 (2–13)	Western Hall (1,213); Macomb, IL
02/27/2016; 7:00 pm, ESPN3	South Dakota	W 90–76	10–17 (3–13)	Western Hall (1,288); Macomb, IL
*Non-conference game. ^{#}Rankings from AP Poll. (#) Tournament seedings in parentheses. All times are in Central Time.
