= 2015–16 South Dakota State Jackrabbits men's basketball team =

American college basketball season

2015–16 South Dakota State Jackrabbits men's basketball

Summit League regular season co–champions Summit League tournament champions Cancún Challenge Mayan Division champions

NCAA tournament, First Round
- Conference: Summit League
- Record: 26–8 (12–4 The Summit)
- Head coach: Scott Nagy (21st season)
- Assistant coaches: Rob Klinkefus; Brian Cooley; Joe Krabbenhoft
- Home arena: Frost Arena

2015–16 Summit League men's basketball standings
	Conf.				Overall
Team	W		L	PCT	W		L	PCT
IPFW	12	–	4	.750	24	–	10	.706
South Dakota State †	12	–	4	.750	26	–	8	.765
Omaha	10	–	6	.625	18	–	14	.563
IUPUI	9	–	7	.563	13	–	19	.406
North Dakota State	8	–	8	.500	20	–	13	.606
Denver	7	–	9	.438	16	–	15	.516
Oral Roberts	6	–	10	.375	14	–	17	.452
South Dakota	5	–	11	.313	14	–	18	.438
Western Illinois	3	–	13	.188	10	–	17	.370
† 2016 Summit League Tournament winner

The 2015–16 South Dakota State Jackrabbits men's basketball team represented South Dakota State University during the 2015–16 NCAA Division I men's basketball season. The Jackrabbits, led by 21st year head coach Scott Nagy, played their home games at Frost Arena and were members of the Summit League. The Jackrabbits finished the season 26–8, 12–4 in Summit League play to share the Summit League regular season championship. They defeated Oral Roberts, Denver, and North Dakota State to win the Summit League tournament. As a result, they received the conference's automatic bid to the NCAA tournament. As a No. 12 seed in the South Region, they were eliminated by No. 5 seed Maryland in the first round.

On April 4, head coach Scott Nagy resigned to become the head coach at Wright State. He finished at South Dakota State with a 21-year record of 410–240. On April 13, the school hired T. J. Otzelberger as head coach.

== Previous season ==
The Jackrabbits finished the 2014–15 season 24–11, 12–4 in Summit League play to win a share of the Summit League regular season championship. They lost to North Dakota State in the finals of the Summit League tournament. As a No. 1 seed in a conference tournament who did not win their tournament, they received an automatic bid to the NIT where they lost in the second round to Vanderbilt.

== Roster ==
2015–16 South Dakota State Jackrabbits men's basketball team
Players
Coaches

Pos.	#	Name	Height	Weight	Year	Hometown
G	0	Deondre Parks	6 ft 4 in (1.93 m)	194 lb (88 kg)	Sr	Flint, Michigan
G	1	Skyler Flatten	6 ft 6 in (1.98 m)	191 lb (87 kg)	RS So	Clark, South Dakota
G	2	Tevin King	6 ft 2 in (1.88 m)	190 lb (86 kg)	Fr	Chicago, Illinois
G	4	Jake Bittle	6 ft 4 in (1.93 m)	217 lb (98 kg)	Sr	Bixby, Oklahoma
G	5	Beau Brown	6 ft 1 in (1.85 m)	157 lb (71 kg)	Fr	Mitchell, South Dakota
G	10	Cole Gentry	5 ft 10 in (1.78 m)	169 lb (77 kg)		Edwardsville, Illinois
G	11	George Marshall	6 ft 1 in (1.85 m)	194 lb (88 kg)	Sr	Chicago, Illinois
G	12	Keaton Moffitt	6 ft 5 in (1.96 m)	197 lb (89 kg)	Sr	Sioux Falls, South Dakota
G	13	Cory Jacobsen	6 ft 1 in (1.85 m)	191 lb (87 kg)	RS Sr	Viborg, South Dakota
G/F	23	Reed Tellinghuisen	6 ft 6 in (1.98 m)	188 lb (85 kg)		Sac City, Iowa
F	24	Mike Daum	6 ft 9 in (2.06 m)	230 lb (104 kg)	RS Fr	Kimball, Nebraska
G/F	25	Lane Severyn	6 ft 5 in (1.96 m)	209 lb (95 kg)	RS So	Pierre, South Dakota
F	30	Connor Devine	6 ft 10 in (2.08 m)	222 lb (101 kg)	Jr	Wasilla, Alaska
F	32	Adam Dykman	6 ft 7 in (2.01 m)	213 lb (97 kg)	Fr	Fremont, Nebraska
F	33	Logan Doyle	6 ft 8 in (2.03 m)	225 lb (102 kg)	RS So	Alexandria, Minnesota
F	42	Ian Theisen	6 ft 9 in (2.06 m)	241 lb (109 kg)	So	Osseo, Minnesota

Head coach

- Scott Nagy (Delta State)

Assistant coach(es)

- Rob Klinkefus (Buena Vista)
- Brian Cooley (Nebraska Wesleyan)
- Joe Krabbenhoft (Wisconsin)

Legend

- (C) Team captain
- (S) Suspended
- (I) Ineligible
- (W) Walk-on
- Injured
- Current redshirt

Roster
Last update: 2015-09-28

== Schedule ==
Date time, TV	Rank^{#}	Opponent^{#}	Result	Record	Site (attendance) city, state
Exhibition
10/29/2015*; 8:30 pm		South Dakota Mines	W 72–43		Frost Arena (1,769); Brookings, SD
11/05/2015*; 8:30 pm		Dakota Wesleyan	W 94–67		Frost Arena (1,936); Brookings, SD
Regular season
11/13/2015*; 8:30 pm		Chadron State	W 87–52	1–0	Frost Arena (2,043); Brookings, SD
11/16/2015*; 7:00 pm		Weber State	W 85–68	2–0	Frost Arena (1,639); Brookings, SD
11/19/2015*; 7:00 pm		at Illinois State; Cancún Challenge	W 83–67	3–0	Redbird Arena (4,107); Normal, IL
11/21/2015*; 1:00 pm, FSSW+		at TCU; Cancún Challenge	W 76–67	4–0	Schollmaier Arena (3,193); Fort Worth, TX
11/24/2015*; 2:00 pm		vs. Houston Baptist; Cancún Challenge Mayan Division semifinals	W 92–68	5–0	Hard Rock Hotel Riviera Maya (982); Cancún, MX
11/25/2015*; 2:00 pm		vs. Cleveland State; Cancún Challenge Mayan Division championship	W 77–66	6–0	Hard Rock Hotel Riviera Maya (982); Cancún, MX
11/28/2015*; 12:00 pm		at UMKC	L 57–64	6–1	Municipal Auditorium (911); Kansas City, MO
12/02/2015*; 7:00 pm		Wayne State	W 80–53	7–1	Frost Arena (1,983); Brookings, SD
12/08/2015*; 7:00 pm, ESPN3		at Minnesota	W 84–70	8–1	Williams Arena (10,378); Minneapolis, MN
12/13/2015*; 2:00 pm, MidcoSN		UC Santa Barbara	W 86–67	9–1	Frost Arena (2,155); Brookings, SD
12/16/2015*; 7:00 pm, FSSW+		at Texas Tech	L 67–79	9–2	United Supermarkets Arena (4,996); Lubbock, TX
12/19/2015*; 4:00 pm, ESPN3		at Florida Gulf Coast	W 56–52	10–2	Alico Arena (3,247); Fort Myers, FL
12/22/2015*; 8:00 pm		at Weber State	L 95–99	10–3	Dee Events Center (6,053); Ogden, UT
12/27/2015*; 4:30 pm, FS North		vs. Middle Tennessee	W 65–61	11–3	Sanford Pentagon (3,200); Sioux Falls, SD
01/01/2016; 7:00 pm		Denver	W 68–59	12–3 (1–0)	Frost Arena (2,543); Brookings, SD
01/03/2016; 2:00 pm, MidcoSN		Western Illinois	W 63–59	13–3 (2–0)	Frost Arena (2,573); Brookings, SD
01/07/2016; 6:00 pm		at IUPUI	L 67–74	13–4 (2–1)	Fairgrounds Coliseum (866); Indianapolis, IN
01/14/2016; 7:00 pm		IPFW	W 92–76	14–4 (3–1)	Frost Arena (2,496); Brookings, SD
01/16/2016; 4:30 pm, MidcoSN		at North Dakota State	L 57–68	14–5 (3–2)	Scheels Arena (4,272); Fargo, ND
01/21/2016; 7:00 pm, ESPN3		at Oral Roberts	W 86–74	15–5 (4–2)	Mabee Center (3,361); Tulsa, OK
01/23/2016; 4:00 pm, MidcoSN		at South Dakota	W 79–75	16–5 (5–2)	DakotaDome (4,832); Vermillion, SD
01/28/2016; 7:00 pm, MidcoSN		Omaha	W 87–76	17–5 (6–2)	Frost Arena (2,840); Brookings, SD
01/30/2016; 4:00 pm		at Denver	W 67–56	18–5 (7–2)	Magness Arena (3,020); Denver, CO
02/06/2016; 7:00 pm, MidcoSN		IUPUI	L 58–80	19–5 (8–2)	Frost Arena (3,792); Brookings, SD
02/10/2016; 7:00 pm, MidcoSN		at Omaha	L 92–96	19–6 (8–3)	Baxter Arena (2,838); Omaha, NE
02/13/2016; 4:30 pm, MidcoSN		South Dakota	W 85–68	20–6 (9–3)	Frost Arena (5,035); Brookings, SD
02/18/2016; 6:00 pm		at IPFW	L 79–91	20–7 (9–4)	Gates Sports Center (1,452); Fort Wayne, IN
02/20/2016; 2:00 pm, ESPN3		at Western Illinois	W 87–67	21–7 (10–4)	Western Hall (1,166); Macomb, IL
02/25/2016; 7:00 pm, MidcoSN		North Dakota State	W 71–59	22–7 (11–4)	Frost Arena (3,169); Brookings, SD
02/27/2016; 4:30 pm, MidcoSN		Oral Roberts	W 73–65	23–7 (12–4)	Frost Arena (3,114); Brookings, SD
The Summit League tournament
03/05/2016; 8:30 pm, ESPN3	(2)	vs. (7) Oral Roberts; Quarterfinals	W 73–70	24–7	Premier Center (10,306); Sioux Falls, SD
03/07/2016; 8:30 pm, ESPN3	(2)	vs. (6) Denver; Semifinals	W 54–53	25–7	Premier Center (9,735); Sioux Falls, SD
03/08/2016; 8:00 pm, ESPN2	(2)	vs. (5) North Dakota State; Championship	W 67–59	26–7	Premier Center (10,188); Sioux Falls, SD
NCAA tournament
03/18/2016*; 3:30 pm, TBS	(12 S)	vs. (5 S) No. 18 Maryland; First Round	L 74–79	26–8	Spokane Veterans Memorial Arena (11,109); Spokane, WA
*Non-conference game. ^{#}Rankings from AP Poll. (#) Tournament seedings in parentheses. S=South Region. All times are in Central Time.
