= 2015–16 Oral Roberts Golden Eagles men's basketball team =

American college basketball season

2015–16 Oral Roberts Golden Eagles men's basketball
- Conference: The Summit League
- Record: 14–17 (6–10 The Summit)
- Head coach: Scott Sutton (17th season)
- Assistant coaches: Kyan Brown; Wade Mason; Sean Sutton
- Home arena: Mabee Center

2015–16 Summit League men's basketball standings
	Conf.				Overall
Team	W		L	PCT	W		L	PCT
IPFW	12	–	4	.750	24	–	10	.706
South Dakota State †	12	–	4	.750	26	–	8	.765
Omaha	10	–	6	.625	18	–	14	.563
IUPUI	9	–	7	.563	13	–	19	.406
North Dakota State	8	–	8	.500	20	–	13	.606
Denver	7	–	9	.438	16	–	15	.516
Oral Roberts	6	–	10	.375	14	–	17	.452
South Dakota	5	–	11	.313	14	–	18	.438
Western Illinois	3	–	13	.188	10	–	17	.370
† 2016 Summit League Tournament winner

The 2015–16 Oral Roberts Golden Eagles men's basketball team represented Oral Roberts University during the 2015–16 NCAA Division I men's basketball season. The Golden Eagles were led by 17th year head coach Scott Sutton and played their home games at the Mabee Center. They were members of The Summit League. They finished the season 14–17, 6–10 in Summit League play to finish in seventh place. They lost in the quarterfinals of The Summit League tournament to South Dakota State.

== Roster ==
Number	Name	Position	Height	Weight	Year	Hometown
0	Aaron Young	Guard	5–11	165	Junior	Edmond, Oklahoma
1	DaQuan Jeffries	Forward	6–5	210	Freshman	Edmond, Oklahoma
2	Aaron Anderson	Guard	6–3	190	RS–Junior	Edmond, Oklahoma
3	Kris Martin	Guard	6–5	177	Freshman	Frisco, Texas
5	Brandon Conley	Forward	6–7	240	Senior	Fort Worth, Texas
10	Jalen Bradley	Guard	6–1	180	Junior	Norfolk, Nebraska
11	Chris Crawford	Guard	6–1	181	Freshman	Tulsa, Oklahoma
12	Isaac Gilliam	Guard	6–2	195	Sophomore	Dripping Springs, Texas
15	Obi Emegano	Guard	6–3	215	RS–Senior	Edmond, Oklahoma
20	Tre Vance	Forward	6–9	220	Junior	Portland, Oregon
21	Adam Glenville	Guard	6–4	203	Senior	O'Fallon, Missouri
25	Javan White	Forward	6–8	205	Freshman	Ames, Iowa
33	Darian Harris	Guard	6–6	195	RS–Sophomore	Springdale, Arkansas
44	Albert Owens	Center	6–9	260	Sophomore	Cedar Hill, Texas

== Schedule ==
Date time, TV	Opponent	Result	Record	Site (attendance) city, state
Exhibition
11/02/2015*; 7:00 pm	Rogers State	W 82–74		Mabee Center; Tulsa, OK
11/07/2015*; 7:00 pm	Central Oklahoma	W 78–58		Mabee Center; Tulsa, OK
Regular season
11/13/2015*; 7:00 pm, ESPN3	Missouri State	W 80–65	1–0	Mabee Center (3,243); Tulsa, OK
11/16/2015*; 6:30 pm, SECN	at South Carolina	L 66-84	1-1	Colonial Life Arena (9,640); Columbia, SC
11/20/2015*; 12:00 pm	vs. UT Martin; Men Against Breast Cancer Classic	W 70–66	2–1	JMU Convocation Center (2,457); Harrisonburg, VA
11/21/2015*; 6:30 pm	at James Madison; Men Against Breast Cancer Classic	W 74–64	3–1	JMU Convocation Center (2,628); Harrisonburg, VA
11/22/2015*; 12:00 pm	at FIU; Men Against Breast Cancer Classic	W 76–70 ^{OT}	4–1	JMU Convocation Center (2,292); Harrisonburg, VA
11/25/2015*; 7:00 pm	Tabor; Men Against Breast Cancer Classic	W 112–80	5–1	Mabee Center (3,350); Tulsa, OK
11/28/2015*; 1:00 pm	Detroit	W 100–95	6–1	Mabee Center (2,914); Tulsa, OK
12/01/2015*; 8:00 pm, RTRM	at New Mexico	L 75–91	6–2	The Pit (11,585); Albuquerque, NM
12/05/2015*; 3:00 pm, ESPN3	at Tulsa; PSO Mayor's Cup	W 70–68	7–2	Reynolds Center (5,225); Tulsa, OK
12/09/2015*; 7:00 pm	John Brown	W 88–53	8–2	Mabee Center (2,908); Tulsa, OK
12/12/2015*; 1:00 pm, FSOK	at No. 7 Oklahoma	L 73–96	8–3	Lloyd Noble Center (9,421); Norman, OK
12/16/2015*; 7:00 pm, ESPN3	at Missouri State	L 66–85	8–4	JQH Arena (4,079); Springfield, MO
12/19/2015*; 7:00 pm, SECN	at LSU	L 77–100	8–5	Pete Maravich Assembly Center (10,095); Baton Rouge, LA
12/21/2015*; 8:00 pm, ESPN3	at New Mexico State	L 61–76	8–6	Pan American Center (4,315); Las Cruces, NM
12/30/2015; 6:00 pm	at IPFW	L 84–90	8–7 (0–1)	Memorial Coliseum (1,368); Fort Wayne, IN
01/03/2016; 7:00 pm, ESPN3	South Dakota	L 84–94	8–8 (0–2)	Mabee Center (2,949); Tulsa, OK
01/06/2016; 8:00 pm, RTRM	at Denver	L 75–78	8–9 (0–3)	Magness Arena (1,039); Denver, CO
01/09/2016; 7:00 pm, ESPN3	North Dakota State	W 66–65	9–9 (1–3)	Mabee Center (3,175); Tulsa, OK
01/14/2016; 6:00 pm, ESPN3	at IUPUI	W 80–71	10–9 (2–3)	Fairgrounds Coliseum (1,006); Indianapolis, IN
01/16/2016; 7:00 pm	at Western Illinois	W 77–68	11–9 (3–3)	Western Hall (1,077); Macomb, IL
01/21/2016; 7:00 pm, ESPN3	South Dakota State	L 74–86	11–10 (3–4)	Mabee Center (3,361); Tulsa, OK
01/23/2016; 7:00 pm, ESPN3	Omaha	L 79–85	11–11 (3–5)	Mabee Center (5,308); Tulsa, OK
01/28/2016; 7:00 pm, ESPN3	IPFW	L 63–68	11–12 (3–6)	Mabee Center (2,895); Tulsa, OK
02/04/2016; 7:00 pm, ESPN3/MidcoSN2	at North Dakota State	L 63–67	11–13 (3–7)	Scheels Arena (2,637); Fargo, ND
02/06/2016; 2:00 pm	at South Dakota	L 79–91	11–14 (3–8)	DakotaDome (1,546); Vermillion, SD
02/11/2016; 7:00 pm, ESPN3	IUPUI	W 77–56	12–14 (4–8)	Mabee Center (2,995); Tulsa, OK
02/13/2016; 7:00 pm, ESPN3	Western Illinois	W 72–66	13–14 (5–8)	Mabee Center (3,128); Tulsa, OK
02/19/2016; 7:00 pm, ESPN3	Denver	W 62–58	14–14 (6–8)	Mabee Center (3,587); Tulsa, OK
02/25/2016; 7:00 pm	at Omaha	L 98–102	14–15 (6–9)	Baxter Arena (3,109); Omaha, NE
02/27/2016; 4:30 pm, ESPN3/MidcoSN	at South Dakota State	L 65–73	14–16 (6–10)	Frost Arena (3,114); Brookings, SD
The Summit League tournament
03/05/2016; 8:30 pm, ESPN3	vs. South Dakota State; Quarterfinals	L 70–73	14–17	Premier Center (10,306); Sioux Falls, SD
*Non-conference game. ^{#}Rankings from AP Poll. (#) Tournament seedings in parentheses. All times are in Central Time.
