= 2015–16 Omaha Mavericks men's basketball team =

American college basketball season

2015–16 Omaha Mavericks men's basketball

CBI, First round
- Conference: Summit League
- Record: 18–14 (10–6 Summit)
- Head coach: Derrin Hansen (11th season)
- Assistant coaches: Pat Eberhart; Tyler Erwin; James Miller
- Home arena: Baxter Arena

2015–16 Summit League men's basketball standings
	Conf.				Overall
Team	W		L	PCT	W		L	PCT
IPFW	12	–	4	.750	24	–	10	.706
South Dakota State †	12	–	4	.750	26	–	8	.765
Omaha	10	–	6	.625	18	–	14	.563
IUPUI	9	–	7	.563	13	–	19	.406
North Dakota State	8	–	8	.500	20	–	13	.606
Denver	7	–	9	.438	16	–	15	.516
Oral Roberts	6	–	10	.375	14	–	17	.452
South Dakota	5	–	11	.313	14	–	18	.438
Western Illinois	3	–	13	.188	10	–	17	.370
† 2016 Summit League Tournament winner

The 2015–16 Omaha Mavericks men's basketball team represented the University of Nebraska Omaha during the 2015–16 NCAA Division I men's basketball season. The Mavericks, led by 11th year head coach Derrin Hansen, played their home games at Baxter Arena and were members of The Summit League. They finished the season 18–14, 10–6 in Summit League play to finish in third place. They lost in the quarterfinals of The Summit League tournament to Denver. They were invited to the College Basketball Invitational where they lost in the first round to Duquesne.

== Roster ==
Number	Name	Position	Height	Weight	Year	Hometown
0	JT Gibson	Guard	6–3	180	Freshman	Brooklyn Park, Minnesota
1	Tim Smallwood	Guard	6–2	175	Senior	Tulsa, Oklahoma
2	Randy Reed	Guard/Forward	6–6	200	Senior	St. Louis, Missouri
3	Devin Patterson	Guard	5–11	160	Senior	Portsmouth, Virginia
4	Kyler Erickson	Guard	6–0	165	Senior	Omaha, Nebraska
11	Alex Allbery	Guard	6–1	180	Sophomore	Omaha, Nebraska
15	Tre'Shawn Thurman	Forward	6–7	230	Sophomore	Omaha, Nebraska
21	Zach Jackson	Guard	6–5	180	Freshman	Wichita, Kansas
23	Marcus Tyus	Guard	6–1	175	Senior	Ramsey, Minnesota
24	Tra-Deon Hollins	Guard	6–2	190	Junior	Omaha, Nebraska
25	Devin Newsome	Guard	5–9	165	Sophomore	Shawnee, Kansas
32	Daniel Meyer	Forward	6–9	240	Sophomore	Billings, Montana
33	Zach Pirog	Center	6–10	200	Freshman	Highlands Ranch, Colorado
35	Ben Kositzke	Forward	6–8	210	Freshman	Omaha, Nebraska
43	Jake White	Forward	6–8	235	Senior	Chaska, Minnesota
44	Mitchell Hahn	Forward	6–8	205	Sophomore	Fremont, Nebraska

== Schedule ==
Date time, TV	Opponent	Result	Record	Site (attendance) city, state
Tour of Italy
08/14/2015*; 9:30 am	vs. All Star Varese	W 85–43		Palazzetto Dello Sport–Milan; Milan, Italy
08/19/2015*; 12:00 pm	vs. Stellazzurra	W 75–39		Hotel Roccaporena; Roccaporena, Italy
08/20/2015*; 12:00 pm	at Isernia	W 107–31		Palazzetto Dello Sport–Isernia; Isernia, Italy
08/21/2015*; 12:00 pm	vs. LUISS University	W 81–41		Arena Altero Felici; Rome, Italy
Regular season
11/13/2015*; 7:00 pm	UC Santa Barbara	L 59–60	0–1	Baxter Arena (3,538); Omaha, NE
11/15/2015*; 4:00 pm	Saint Mary's (MN)	W 104–58	1–1	Baxter Arena (1,154); Omaha, NE
11/17/2015*; 7:00 pm, FSMO	UMKC	W 95–89 ^{OT}	2–1	Baxter Arena (1,278); Omaha, NE
11/22/2015*; 1:00 pm, P12N	at Colorado	L 82–87	2–2	Coors Events Center (7,199); Boulder, CO
11/25/2015*; 8:00 pm	at Northern Colorado	W 105–85	3–2	Bank of Colorado Arena (1,106); Greeley, CO
11/27/2015*; 2:00 pm, ESPN3	at Minnesota	L 90–93	3–3	Williams Arena (9,976); Minneapolis, MN
12/01/2015*; 7:00 pm	Eastern Michigan	L 73–80	3–4	Baxter Arena (1,739); Omaha, NE
12/06/2015*; 2:00 pm	at Montana State	W 100–97	4–4	Worthington Arena (1,533); Bozeman, MT
12/09/2015*; 7:00 pm, SECN	at Missouri	L 78–85	4–5	Mizzou Arena (5,022); Columbia, MO
12/13/2015*; 8:00 pm	at Grand Canyon; Global Sports Classic	W 108–104 ^{OT}	5–5	GCU Arena (4,614); Phoenix, AZ
12/16/2015*; 7:00 pm	Simpson	W 81–71	6–5	Baxter Arena (1,823); Omaha, NE
12/19/2015*	at Wyoming; Global Sports Classic	L 75–76	6–6	Arena-Auditorium (4,408); Laramie, WY
12/21/2015*; 1:00 pm	vs. Eastern Illinois; Global Sports Classic	W 80–68	7–6	Cox Pavilion; Paradise, NV
12/22/2015*; 3:30 pm	vs. Southern; Global Sports Classic	W 74–53	8–6	Cox Pavilion; Paradise, NV
01/01/2016; 1:00 pm	Western Illinois	W 82–80	9–6 (1–0)	Baxter Arena (1,576); Omaha, NE
01/03/2016; 4:30 pm	IUPUI	W 76–71	10–6 (2–0)	Baxter Arena (1,579); Omaha, NE
01/07/2016; 7:00 pm	at North Dakota State	W 91–82	11–6 (3–0)	Scheels Arena (1,887); Fargo, ND
01/09/2016; 4:30 pm, ESPN3/MidcoSN	at South Dakota	W 79–73	12–6 (4–0)	DakotaDome (1,741); Vermillion, SD
01/16/2016; 1:00 pm	IPFW	L 101–106 ^{OT}	12–7 (4–1)	Baxter Arena (2,220); Omaha, NE
01/21/2016; 8:00 pm	at Denver	W 69–55	13–7 (5–1)	Magness Arena (1,078); Denver, CO
01/23/2016; 7:00 pm, ESPN3	at Oral Roberts	W 85–79	14–7 (6–1)	Mabee Center (5,308); Tulsa, OK
01/28/2016; 7:00 pm, ESPN3	at South Dakota State	L 76–87	14–8 (6–2)	Frost Arena (2,840); Brookings, SD
01/30/2016; 7:00 pm	South Dakota	W 96–83	15–8 (7–2)	Baxter Arena (3,345); Omaha, NE
02/03/2016; 7:00 pm, ESPN3	at Western Illinois	L 76–83	15–9 (7–3)	Western Hall (922); Macomb, IL
02/06/2016; 1:00 pm	Denver	L 72–75	15–10 (7–4)	Baxter Arena (2,222); Omaha, NE
02/10/2016; 7:00 pm, ESPN3/MidcoSN	South Dakota State	W 96–92	16–10 (8–4)	Baxter Arena (2,838); Omaha, NE
02/13/2016; 1:00 pm	North Dakota State	W 76–69	17–10 (9–4)	Baxter Arena (3,028); Omaha, NE
02/17/2016; 6:00 pm, ESPN3	at IUPUI	L 76–88	17–11 (9–5)	Fairgrounds Coliseum (1,044); Indianapolis, IN
02/20/2016; 6:00 pm	at IPFW	L 90–94	17–12 (9–6)	Gates Sports Center (1,832); Fort Wayne, IN
02/25/2016; 7:00 pm	Oral Roberts	W 102–98	18–12 (10–6)	Baxter Arena (3,109); Omaha, NE
The Summit League tournament
03/06/2016; 8:30 pm, ESPN3	vs. Denver; Quarterfinals	L 70–78	18–13	Premier Center (6,432); Sioux Falls, SD
CBI
03/16/2016*; 6:00 pm	at Duquesne; First round	L 112–120	18–14	Palumbo Center (609); Pittsburgh, PA
*Non-conference game. ^{#}Rankings from AP Poll. (#) Tournament seedings in parentheses. All times are in Central Time.
