= 2015–16 North Dakota State Bison men's basketball team =

American college basketball season

2015–16 North Dakota State Bison men's basketball
- Conference: Summit League
- Record: 20–13 (8–8 The Summit)
- Head coach: David Richman (2nd season)
- Assistant coaches: Jayden Olson; Eric Henderson; Freddy Coleman
- Home arena: Scheels Arena

2015–16 Summit League men's basketball standings
	Conf.				Overall
Team	W		L	PCT	W		L	PCT
IPFW	12	–	4	.750	24	–	10	.706
South Dakota State †	12	–	4	.750	26	–	8	.765
Omaha	10	–	6	.625	18	–	14	.563
IUPUI	9	–	7	.563	13	–	19	.406
North Dakota State	8	–	8	.500	20	–	13	.606
Denver	7	–	9	.438	16	–	15	.516
Oral Roberts	6	–	10	.375	14	–	17	.452
South Dakota	5	–	11	.313	14	–	18	.438
Western Illinois	3	–	13	.188	10	–	17	.370
† 2016 Summit League Tournament winner

The 2015–16 North Dakota State Bison men's basketball team represented North Dakota State University in the 2015–16 NCAA Division I men's basketball season. The Bison, led by second year head coach David Richman, played their home games at the Scheels Arena, due to renovations at the Bison Sports Arena, and were members of The Summit League. They finished the season 20–13, 8–8 in Summit League play to finish in fifth place. They defeated IUPUI and IPFW to advance to the championship game of The Summit League tournament where they lost to South Dakota State. Despite having 20 wins, they did not participate in a postseason tournament.

== Roster ==
Number	Name	Position	Height	Weight	Year	Hometown
0	Brian Ishola	Guard/Forward	6–5	210	Sophomore	Woodbury, Minnesota
2	Paul Miller	Guard	6–4	190	Sophomore	Waukesha, Wisconsin
3	Carlin Dupree	Guard	6–3	190	Junior	Milwaukee, Wisconsin
4	Malik Clements	Guard	6–4	195	Sophomore	Madison, Wisconsin
12	Zach Rammelt	Guard	6–4	185	Freshman	Racine, Wisconsin
13	Khy Kabellis	Guard	6–3	170	Freshman	Escondido, California
21	A.J. Jacobson	Guard	6–6	215	Sophomore	Fargo, North Dakota
22	Kory Brown	Guard	6–4	205	Senior	Hoffman Estates, Illinois
24	Trey Miller	Guard/Forward	6–7	195	RS–Freshman	Woodinville, Washington
30	Spencer Eliason	Forward	6–9	235	RS–Freshman	Chadron, Nebraska
32	Evan Wesenberg	Forward	6–7	205	Sophomore	Germantown, Wisconsin
34	Chris Kading	Forward	6–8	240	Senior	De Pere, Wisconsin
40	Dexter Werner	Forward	6–6	240	RS–Junior	Bismarck, North Dakota
42	Dylan Miller	Forward	6–9	225	Freshman	Panama, Illinois

== Schedule ==
Date time, TV	Rank^{#}	Opponent^{#}	Result	Record	Site (attendance) city, state
Exhibition
11/04/2015*; 7:00 pm		University of Mary	W 91–58		Scheels Arena; Fargo, ND
Non-conference regular season
11/13/2015*; 7:30 pm		at UC Davis	W 79–71 ^{OT}	1–0	The Pavilion (3,366); Davis, CA
11/15/2015*; 2:00 pm, ESPN3		at Illinois	L 74–80	1–1	Prairie Capital Convention Center (5,332); Springfield, IL
11/18/2015*; 7:00 pm		Valley City State	W 69–49	2–1	Scheels Arena (2,142); Fargo, ND
11/25/2015*; 7:00 pm, MeTV		Montana	W 73–53	3–1	Scheels Arena (3,536); Fargo, ND
11/28/2015*; 1:00 pm		North Carolina A&T	W 77–56	4–1	Scheels Arena (2,052); Fargo, ND
12/01/2015*; 7:00 pm		at No. 5 Iowa State	L 64–84	4–2	Hilton Coliseum (14,272); Ames, IA
12/04/2015*; 7:00 pm		at Arkansas State	W 74–73	5–2	Convocation Center (1,054); Jonesboro, AR
12/06/2015*; 4:30 pm		at Southern Miss	L 62–74	5–3	Reed Green Coliseum (2,972); Hattiesburg, MS
12/11/2015*; 7:30 pm, FCS		at North Dakota	W 69–67	6–3	Betty Engelstad Sioux Center (2,593); Grand Forks, ND
12/16/2015*; 7:00 pm, MeTV		Montana State	W 73–64	7–3	Scheels Arena (2,523); Fargo, ND
12/21/2015*; 6:30 pm		vs. Idaho State; World Vision Classic	W 67–62	8–3	Smith Spectrum (8,156); Logan, UT
12/22/2015*; 6:30 pm		vs. Texas–Rio Grande Valley; World Vision Classic	W 68–50	9–3	Smith Spectrum (7,746); Logan, UT
12/23/2015*; 9:00 pm		at Utah State; World Vision Classic	L 62–76	9–4	Smith Spectrum (8,321); Logan, UT
12/30/2015*; 7:00 pm		Northland	W 105–47	10–4	Scheels Arena (2,231); Fargo, ND
Summit League regular season
01/03/2016; 4:00 pm, MeTV		Denver	W 75–49	11–4 (1–0)	Scheels Arena (2,422); Fargo, ND
01/07/2016; 7:00 pm, MeTV		Omaha	L 82–91	11–5 (1–1)	Scheels Arena (1,887); Fargo, ND
01/09/2016; 7:00 pm, ESPN3		at Oral Roberts	L 65–66	11–6 (1–2)	Mabee Center (3,175); Tulsa, OK
01/13/2016; 7:00 pm, ESPN3/MidcoSN		South Dakota	W 66–65	12–6 (2–2)	Scheels Arena (3,153); Fargo, ND
01/16/2016; 4:30 pm, ESPN3/MidcoSN		South Dakota State	W 68–57	13–6 (3–2)	Scheels Arena (4,272); Fargo, ND
01/21/2016; 6:00 pm		at IPFW	L 74–79	13–7 (3–3)	Gates Sports Center (964); Fort Wayne, IN
01/23/2016; 2:00 pm, ESPN3		at Western Illinois	W 65–52	14–7 (4–3)	Western Hall (1,301); Macomb, IL
01/31/2016; 12:00 pm, ESPN3		at IUPUI	L 72–73	14–8 (4–4)	Fairgrounds Coliseum (1,113); Indianapolis, IN
02/04/2016; 7:00 pm, ESPN3/MidcoSN		Oral Roberts	W 67–63	15–8 (5–4)	Scheels Arena (2,637); Fargo, ND
02/06/2016; 4:00 pm, MeTV		IPFW	W 62–46	16–8 (6–4)	Scheels Arena (3,230); Fargo, ND
02/11/2016; 7:00 pm		at South Dakota	L 58–72	16–9 (6–5)	DakotaDome (1,595); Vermillion, SD
02/13/2016; 1:00 pm		at Omaha	L 69–76	16–10 (6–6)	Baxter Arena (3,028); Omaha, NE
02/17/2016; 7:00 pm, MeTV		Western Illinois	W 63–54	17–10 (7–6)	Scheels Arena (2,227); Fargo, ND
02/20/2016; 4:00 pm, NBCND		IUPUI	W 63–59	18–10 (8–6)	Scheels Arena (3,812); Fargo, ND
02/25/2016; 7:00 pm, ESPN3/MidcoSN		at South Dakota State	L 59–71	18–11 (8–7)	Frost Arena (3,169); Brookings, SD
02/27/2016; 5:00 pm, RTRM		at Denver	L 59–70	18–12 (8–8)	Magness Arena (2,876); Denver, CO
The Summit League tournament
03/06/2016; 6:00 pm, ESPN3	(5)	vs. (4) IUPUI; Quarterfinals	W 60–45	19–12	Premier Center (6,432); Sioux Falls, SD
03/07/2016; 6:00 pm, ESPN3	(5)	vs. (1) IPFW; Semifinals	W 69–68	20–12	Premier Center (9,735); Sioux Falls, SD
03/08/2016; 8:00 pm, ESPN2	(5)	vs. (2) South Dakota State; Championship game	L 59–67	20–13	Premier Center (10,188); Sioux Falls, SD
*Non-conference game. ^{#}Rankings from AP Poll. (#) Tournament seedings in parentheses. All times are in Central Time.
