= 2015–16 South Dakota Coyotes men's basketball team =

American college basketball season

2015–16 South Dakota Coyotes men's basketball
- Conference: The Summit League
- Record: 14–18 (5–11 The Summit)
- Head coach: Craig Smith (2nd season)
- Assistant coaches: Gameli Ahelegbe; Austin Hansen; Eric Peterson
- Home arena: DakotaDome

2015–16 Summit League men's basketball standings
| | Conf. | | | | Overall |
| Team | W | | L | PCT | W | | L | PCT |
|---|---|---|---|---|---|---|---|---|
| IPFW | 12 | – | 4 | .750 | 24 | – | 10 | .706 |
| South Dakota State † | 12 | – | 4 | .750 | 26 | – | 8 | .765 |
| Omaha | 10 | – | 6 | .625 | 18 | – | 14 | .563 |
| IUPUI | 9 | – | 7 | .563 | 13 | – | 19 | .406 |
| North Dakota State | 8 | – | 8 | .500 | 20 | – | 13 | .606 |
| Denver | 7 | – | 9 | .438 | 16 | – | 15 | .516 |
| Oral Roberts | 6 | – | 10 | .375 | 14 | – | 17 | .452 |
| South Dakota | 5 | – | 11 | .313 | 14 | – | 18 | .438 |
| Western Illinois | 3 | – | 13 | .188 | 10 | – | 17 | .370 |
† 2016 Summit League Tournament winner

The 2015–16 South Dakota Coyotes men's basketball team represented the University of South Dakota during the 2015–16 NCAA Division I men's basketball season. The Coyotes, led by second year head coach Craig Smith, played their home games at the DakotaDome and were members of The Summit League. They finished the season 14–18, 5–11 in Summit League play to finish in eighth play. They lost in the quarterfinals of The Summit League tournament to IPFW.

This was the Coyotes' final season at the DakotaDome; the team moved into the new Sanford Coyote Sports Center for the 2016–17 season.

== Roster ==
| Number | Name | Position | Height | Year | Hometown |
|---|---|---|---|---|---|
| 0 | Trey Dickerson | Guard | 6–1 | Junior | Queens, New York |
| 1 | Trey Norris | Guard | 6–0 | Senior | Grand Prairie, Texas |
| 2 | Tre Burnette | Guard | 6–5 | Senior | Madison, Wisconsin |
| 3 | Shy McClelland | Guard | 6–0 | Junior | Milwaukee, Wisconsin |
| 10 | Zach Dickerson | Guard | 6–3 | Sophomore | Argyle, Texas |
| 13 | Matt Mooney | Guard | 6–3 | Sophomore | Chicago, Illinois |
| 14 | Casey Kasperbauer | Guard | 6–1 | Senior | Carroll, Iowa |
| 21 | Tyler Borchers | Forward | 6–6 | Freshman | LeMars, Iowa |
| 23 | Tyler Flack | Forward | 6–7 | Junior | Lakeville, Minnesota |
| 24 | Duol Mayot | Forward | 6–5 | Senior | Omaha, Nebraska |
| 25 | Tyler Hagedorn | Forward | 6–8 | Freshman | Norfolk, Nebraska |
| 31 | Dan Jech | Forward | 6–9 | Freshman | Rochester, Minnesota |
| 32 | Dejon "D.J." Davis | Guard | 6–4 | Sophomore | Bloomington, Minnesota |
| 41 | Eric Robertson | Forward | 6–8 | Senior | Wayzata, Minnesota |
| 45 | Austin Sparks | Forward | 6–8 | Sophomore | Denver, Colorado |
| 55 | Carlton Hurst | Guard | 6–3 | Junior | Denver, Colorado |

== Schedule ==
| Date time, TV | Opponent | Result | Record | Site (attendance) city, state |
Regular season
| 11/13/2015*; 4:30 pm | vs. Wright State; NIU Tournament | L 69–77 | 0–1 | Convocation Center (995); DeKalb, IL |
| 11/14/2015*; 3:30 pm | at Northern Illinois; NIU Tournament | L 65–72 | 0–2 | Convocation Center (913); DeKalb, IL |
| 11/15/2015*; 1:00 pm | vs. Cal State Northridge; NIU Tournament | W 76–72 | 1–2 | Convocation Center (888); DeKalb, IL |
| 11/20/2015*; 7:00 pm, FSKC | at Kansas State | L 72–93 | 1–3 | Bramlage Coliseum (12,257); Manhattan, KS |
| 11/24/2015*; 7:00 pm | South Dakota Mines | W 83–63 | 2–3 | DakotaDome (1,260); Vermillion, SD |
| 11/28/2015*; 5:30 pm | at Sacramento State; Sacramento State Tournament | W 96–90 | 3–3 | Hornets Nest (778); Sacramento, CA |
| 11/29/2015*; 4:30 pm | vs. Eastern Washington; Sacramento State Tournament | W 77–71 | 4–3 | Hornets Nest (314); Sacramento, CA |
| 12/05/2015*; 7:00 pm | at Minnesota | W 85–81 ^{2OT} | 5–3 | Williams Arena (10,754); Minneapolis, MN |
| 12/08/2015*; 7:00 pm | UMKC | W 79–70 | 6–3 | DakotaDome (1,423); Vermillion, SD |
| 12/12/2015*; 5:30 pm | Cal State Bakersfield | L 67–77 | 6–4 | DakotaDome (2,006); Vermillion, SD |
| 12/17/2015*; 7:00 pm | at Milwaukee | W 92–91 ^{2OT} | 7–4 | UW–Milwaukee Panther Arena (2,034); Milwaukee, WI |
| 12/19/2015*; 2:00 pm | at Illinois | L 79–91 | 7–5 | State Farm Center (11,714); Champaign, IL |
| 12/22/2015*; 9:00 pm | at UNLV | L 68–103 | 7–6 | Thomas & Mack Center (11,990); Paradise, NV |
| 12/28/2015*; 7:00 pm | vs. Florida Gulf Coast | W 89–81 ^{OT} | 8–6 | Sanford Pentagon (2,087); Sioux Falls, SD |
| 01/01/2016; 2:30 pm | IUPUI | L 66–77 | 8–7 (0–1) | DakotaDome (1,776); Vermillion, SD |
| 01/03/2016; 7:00 pm, ESPN3 | at Oral Roberts | W 94–84 | 9–7 (1–1) | Mabee Center (2,949); Tulsa, OK |
| 01/06/2016; 6:00 pm | at IPFW | L 65–85 | 9–8 (1–2) | Memorial Coliseum (1,077); Fort Wayne, IN |
| 01/09/2016; 4:00 pm, ESPN3 | Omaha | L 73–79 | 9–9 (1–3) | DakotaDome (1,741); Vermillion, SD |
| 01/13/2016; 7:00 pm, ESPN3 | at North Dakota State | L 65–66 | 9–10 (1–4) | Scheels Arena (3,153); Fargo, ND |
| 01/20/2016; 7:00 pm | Western Illinois | W 76–67 | 10–10 (2–4) | DakotaDome (1,674); Vermillion, SD |
| 01/23/2016; 4:00 pm, ESPN3 | South Dakota State | L 75–79 | 10–11 (2–5) | DakotaDome (4,832); Vermillion, SD |
| 01/28/2016; 8:00 pm | at Denver | L 52–66 | 10–12 (2–6) | Magness Arena (1,102); Denver, CO |
| 01/30/2016; 7:00 pm | at Omaha | L 83–96 | 10–13 (2–7) | Baxter Arena (3,345); Omaha, NE |
| 02/04/2016; 7:00 pm | IPFW | L 82–95 | 10–14 (2–8) | DakotaDome (1,510); Vermillion, SD |
| 02/06/2016; 2:00 pm | Oral Roberts | W 91–79 | 11–14 (3–8) | DakotaDome (1,546); Vermillion, SD |
| 02/11/2016; 7:00 pm | North Dakota State | W 72–58 | 12–14 (4–8) | DakotaDome (1,595); Vermillion, SD |
| 02/13/2016; 4:30 pm, ESPN3 | at South Dakota State | L 68–85 | 12–15 (4–9) | Frost Arena (5,035); Brookings, SD |
| 02/17/2016*; 7:00 pm | York (NE) | W 82–55 | 13–15 | DakotaDome (1,480); Vermillion, SD |
| 02/21/2016; 2:00 pm, ESPN3 | Denver | L 71–76 | 13–16 (4–10) | DakotaDome (1,644); Vermillion, SD |
| 02/25/2016; 6:00 pm, ESPN3 | at IUPUI | W 85–82 | 14–16 (5–10) | Fairgrounds Coliseum (946); Indianapolis, IN |
| 02/27/2016; 7:00 pm, ESPN3 | at Western Illinois | L 76–90 | 14–17 (5–11) | Western Hall (1,288); Macomb, IL |
The Summit League tournament
| 03/05/2016; 6:00 pm, ESPN3 | vs. IPFW; Quarterfinals | L 70–86 | 14–18 | Premier Center (10,306); Sioux Falls, SD |
*Non-conference game. ^{#}Rankings from AP Poll. (#) Tournament seedings in parentheses. All times are in Central Time.
