= 2015–16 IUPUI Jaguars men's basketball team =

American college basketball season

2015–16 IUPUI Jaguars men's basketball
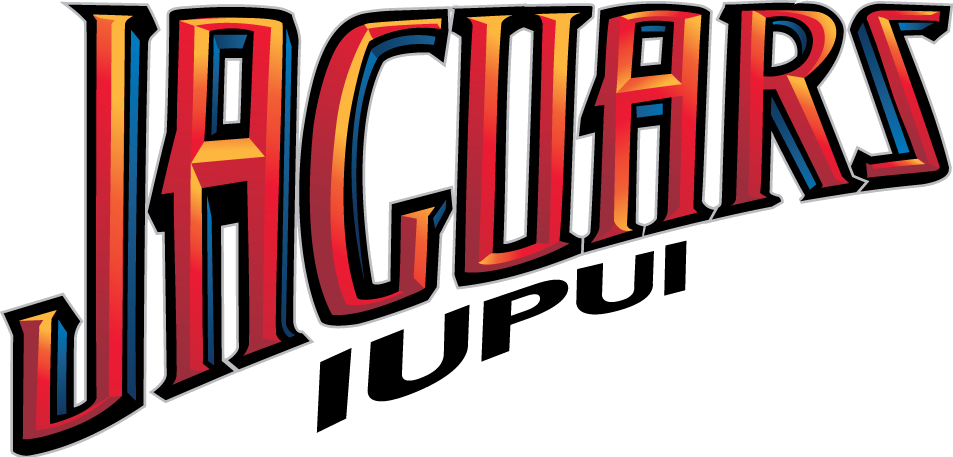
- Conference: The Summit League
- Record: 13–19 (9–7 The Summit)
- Head coach: Jason Gardner (2nd season)
- Assistant coaches: Matt Crenshaw; Jon-Michael Nickerson; Scott Gillespie
- Home arena: Indiana Farmers Coliseum

2015–16 Summit League men's basketball standings
	Conf.				Overall
Team	W		L	PCT	W		L	PCT
IPFW	12	–	4	.750	24	–	10	.706
South Dakota State †	12	–	4	.750	26	–	8	.765
Omaha	10	–	6	.625	18	–	14	.563
IUPUI	9	–	7	.563	13	–	19	.406
North Dakota State	8	–	8	.500	20	–	13	.606
Denver	7	–	9	.438	16	–	15	.516
Oral Roberts	6	–	10	.375	14	–	17	.452
South Dakota	5	–	11	.313	14	–	18	.438
Western Illinois	3	–	13	.188	10	–	17	.370
† 2016 Summit League Tournament winner

The 2015–16 IUPUI Jaguars men's basketball team represented Indiana University – Purdue University Indianapolis during the 2015–16 NCAA Division I men's basketball season. The Jaguars, led by second-year head coach Jason Gardner, played their home games at Indiana Farmers Coliseum, and were members of The Summit League. They finished the season 13–19, 9–7 in Summit League play to finish in fourth place. They lost in the quarterfinals of The Summit League tournament to North Dakota State.

== Roster ==
2015–16 IUPUI Jaguars men's basketball team
Players
Coaches

Pos.	#	Name	Height	Weight	Year	Previous school	Hometown
G	0	Darell Combs	6 ft 2 in (1.88 m)	175 lb (79 kg)	RS Jr	Thornwood (Eastern Michigan)	Chicago, IL
G	1	T.J. Henderson	6 ft 0 in (1.83 m)	160 lb (73 kg)	Fr	Scecina	Indianapolis, IN
G	2	Mason Archie, II	6 ft 5 in (1.96 m)	185 lb (84 kg)	RS Sr	Tindley (Davidson)	Indianapolis, IN
G	4	Jordan Pickett	6 ft 0 in (1.83 m)	165 lb (75 kg)	RS Jr	Pike (Loyola)	Indianapolis, IN
G	5	Leo Svete	6 ft 5 in (1.96 m)	200 lb (91 kg)	RS So	Penn (Western Michigan)	Granger, IN
F	15	Matt O'Leary	6 ft 8 in (2.03 m)	225 lb (102 kg)	RS Jr	Terre Haute North Vigo (Loyola)	Terre Haute, IN
G	20	Grant Sinn (redshirt)	6 ft 2 in (1.88 m)	180 lb (82 kg)	RS Fr	Canterbury (North Park)	Spencerville, IN
G	22	Marcellus Barksdale	6 ft 5 in (1.96 m)	210 lb (95 kg)	RS Sr	Tates Creek	Lexington, KY
F	24	Evan Hall	6 ft 7 in (2.01 m)	200 lb (91 kg)	Fr	Knott County Central	Hindman, KY
G	25	Ron Patterson (redshirt)	6 ft 2 in (1.88 m)	200 lb (91 kg)	RS So	Broad Ripple (Syracuse)	Indianapolis, IN
G	31	John Hubler	6 ft 1 in (1.85 m)	185 lb (84 kg)	So	Whiteland	Whiteland, IN
G	32	D.J. McCall	6 ft 5 in (1.96 m)	180 lb (82 kg)	So	Concordia Lutheran	Fort Wayne
F	33	Nick Osborne	6 ft 8 in (2.03 m)	220 lb (100 kg)	RS Jr	Muncie Central (Loyola)	Muncie, IN
F/C	35	Noah Thomas	6 ft 9 in (2.06 m)	235 lb (107 kg)	Fr	Bridgton Academy	Whitestown
F	45	Aaron Brennan	6 ft 6 in (1.98 m)	200 lb (91 kg)	So	Guerin Catholic	Noblesville, IN

Head coach

- Jason Gardner (Arizona)

Assistant coach(es)

- Matt Crenshaw (IUPUI)
- Jon-Michael Nickerson (Kennesaw State)
- Scott Gillespie (Ripon)

Legend

- (C) Team captain
- (S) Suspended
- (I) Ineligible
- (W) Walk-on
- Injured
- Current redshirt

Roster
Last update: July 18, 2015

== Schedule ==
Date time, TV	Opponent	Result	Record	Site (attendance) city, state
Exhibition
Nov 6, 2015*; 7:00 pm	Earlham College	W 85–55		Fairgrounds Coliseum (1,039); Indianapolis, IN
Non-conference regular season
Nov 13, 2015*; 7:00 pm	at Indiana State	W 72–70	1–0	Hulman Center (4,131); Terre Haute, IN
Nov 16, 2015*; 9:00 pm	at Marquette; Legends Classic	L 71–75 ^{OT}	1–1	BMO Harris Bradley Center (11,597); Milwaukee, WI
Nov 18, 2015*; 7:00 pm	at NC State; Legends Classic	L 56–79	1–2	PNC Arena (14,660); Raleigh, NC
Nov 21, 2015*; 1:00 pm	Kentucky State	W 86–82	2–2	Fairgrounds Coliseum (971); Indianapolis, IN
Nov 23, 2015*; 6:30 pm	at Kennesaw State; Legends Classic	L 63–71	2–3	KSU Convocation Center (1,262); Kennesaw, GA
Nov 24, 2015*; 3:00 pm	vs. South Alabama; Legends Classic	L 68–78	2–4	KSU Convocation Center (208); Kennesaw, GA
Nov 27, 2015*; 7:00 pm, ESPN3	at Georgia State	L 72–78 ^{OT}	2–5	GSU Sports Arena (1,557); Atlanta, GA
Dec 1, 2015*; 7:00 pm, ESPN3	at Ball State	L 58–61	2–6	John E. Worthen Arena (2,397); Muncie, IN
Dec 5, 2015*; 1:00 pm, HTSN/ESPN3	Miami (Ohio)	W 78–64	3–6	Fairgrounds Coliseum (1,079); Indianapolis, IN
Dec 7, 2015*; 7:00 pm, ESPNU	at Purdue	L 53–80	3–7	Mackey Arena (12,404); West Lafayette, IN
Dec 10, 2015*; 8:00 pm, ESPN3	at Missouri State	L 74–88	3–8	JQH Arena (4,113); Springfield, MO
Dec 12, 2015*; 5:00 pm, FS1	at Creighton	L 65–90	3–9	CenturyLink Center Omaha (16,785); Omaha, NE
Dec 19, 2015*; 1:00 pm, HTSN/ESPN3	Southern Utah	W 82–68	4–9	Fairgrounds Coliseum (886); Indianapolis, IN
Dec 21, 2015*; 8:00 pm, ESPN3	at Memphis	L 48–84	4–10	FedExForum (10,655); Memphis, TN
Dec 28, 2015*; 7:00 pm, FS2	at No. 9 Butler	L 54–92	4–11	Hinkle Fieldhouse (8,210); Indianapolis, IN
Summit League regular season
Jan 1, 2016; 3:30 pm	at South Dakota	W 77–66	5–11 (1–0)	DakotaDome (1,776); Vermillion, SD
Jan 3, 2016; 5:30 pm	at Omaha	L 71–76	5–12 (1–1)	Baxter Arena (1,579); Omaha, NE
Jan 7, 2016; 7:00 pm, HTSN/ESPN3	South Dakota State	W 74–67	6–12 (2–1)	Indiana Farmers Coliseum (866); Indianapolis, IN
Jan 10, 2016; 3:00 pm	at Western Illinois	W 67–60	7–12 (3–1)	Western Hall (1,002); Macomb, IL
Jan 14, 2016; 7:00 pm, HTSN/ESPN3	Oral Roberts	L 71–80	7–13 (3–2)	Indiana Farmers Coliseum (1,006); Indianapolis, IN
Jan 16, 2016; 1:00 pm, HTSN/ESPN3	Denver	W 76–61	8–13 (4–2)	Indiana Farmers Coliseum (1,140); Indianapolis, IN
Jan 23, 2016; 7:00 pm	at IPFW	W 84–82	9–13 (5–2)	Gates Sports Center (1,530); Fort Wayne, IN
Jan 29, 2016; 1:00 pm, HTSN/ESPN3	Western Illinois	W 69–67	10–13 (6–2)	Indiana Farmers Coliseum (883); Indianapolis, IN
Jan 31, 2016; 1:00 pm, HTSN/ESPN3	North Dakota State	W 73–72	11–13 (7–2)	Indiana Farmers Coliseum (1,113); Indianapolis, IN
Feb 4, 2016; 9:00 pm	at Denver	L 51–53	11–14 (7–3)	Magness Arena (1,135); Denver, CO
Feb 6, 2016; 8:00 pm, ESPN3	at South Dakota State	L 58–80	11–15 (7–4)	Frost Arena (3,792); Brookings, SD
Feb 11, 2016; 8:00 pm, ESPN3	at Oral Roberts	L 56–77	11–16 (7–5)	Mabee Center (2,995); Tulsa, OK
Feb 17, 2016; 7:00 pm, HTSN/ESPN3	Omaha	W 88–76	12–16 (8–5)	Indiana Farmers Coliseum (1,044); Indianapolis, IN
Feb 20, 2016; 5:00 pm	at North Dakota State	L 59–63	12–17 (8–6)	Scheels Arena (3,812); Fargo, ND
Feb 25, 2016; 7:00 pm, HTSN/ESPN3	South Dakota	L 82–85	12–18 (8–7)	Indiana Farmers Coliseum (946); Indianapolis, IN
Feb 27, 2016; 1:00 pm, HTSN/ESPN3	IPFW	W 80–77	13–18 (9–7)	Indiana Farmers Coliseum (1,675); Indianapolis, IN
The Summit League tournament
Mar 6, 2016; 7:00 pm, ESPN3	vs. North Dakota State; Quarterfinals	L 45–60	13–19	Premier Center (6,432); Sioux Falls, SD
*Non-conference game. ^{#}Rankings from AP Poll. (#) Tournament seedings in parentheses. All times are in Eastern Time.
