= 2015–16 IPFW Mastodons men's basketball team =

American college basketball season

2015–16 Fort Wayne Mastodons men's basketball
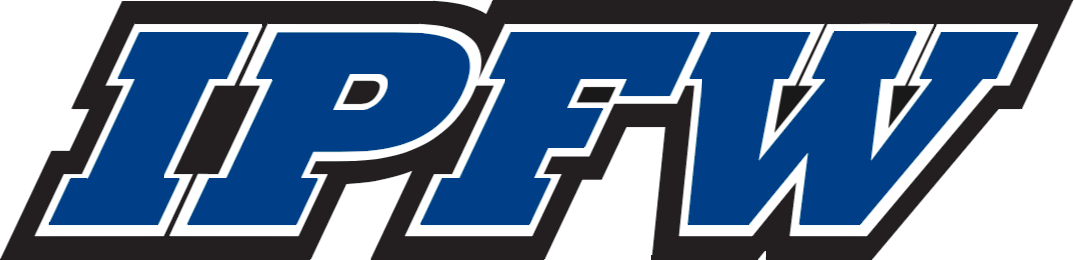

The Summit League regular season co–champions

NIT, First round
- Conference: The Summit League
- Record: 24–10 (12–4 The Summit)
- Head coach: Jon Coffman (2nd season)
- Assistant coaches: Mark Downey (1st season); Ryan Sims (5th season); Ben Botts (2nd season)
- Home arena: Gates Sports Center; Allen County War Memorial Coliseum

2015–16 Summit League men's basketball standings
	Conf.				Overall
Team	W		L	PCT	W		L	PCT
IPFW	12	–	4	.750	24	–	10	.706
South Dakota State †	12	–	4	.750	26	–	8	.765
Omaha	10	–	6	.625	18	–	14	.563
IUPUI	9	–	7	.563	13	–	19	.406
North Dakota State	8	–	8	.500	20	–	13	.606
Denver	7	–	9	.438	16	–	15	.516
Oral Roberts	6	–	10	.375	14	–	17	.452
South Dakota	5	–	11	.313	14	–	18	.438
Western Illinois	3	–	13	.188	10	–	17	.370
† 2016 Summit League Tournament winner

The 2015–16 Fort Wayne Mastodons men's basketball team represented Indiana University – Purdue University Fort Wayne during the 2015–16 NCAA Division I men's basketball season. The Mastodons, led by second year head coach Jon Coffman, played their home games at the Gates Sports Center, with five home games at the Allen County War Memorial Coliseum, and were members of The Summit League. They finished the season 24–10, 12–4 in Summit League play to finish in a tie for the regular season championship. They lost in the semifinals of the Summit League tournament to North Dakota State. As a regular season league champion who was also the #1 seed in their league tournament, they received an automatic bid to the National Invitation Tournament where they lost in the first round to San Diego State.

== Previous season ==
The Mastodons finished the 2014–15 season with a record of 16–15, 9–7 in conference. They lost to South Dakota State in the quarterfinals of the Summit League tournament. IPFW received a bid to the CIT where they lost in the first round to Evansville.

== Roster ==
2015–16 IPFW Mastodons men's basketball team
Players
Coaches

Pos.	#	Name	Height	Weight	Year	Hometown
G	0	Mo Evans	6 ft 1 in (1.85 m)	185 lb (84 kg)	Jr	Indianapolis, IN
G	2	DeAngelo Stewart	6 ft 4 in (1.93 m)	205 lb (93 kg)	Jr	Detroit, MI
G	4	John Konchar	6 ft 5 in (1.96 m)	207 lb (94 kg)	RS Fr	Chicago, IL
G	5	Charles Ruise, Jr.	6 ft 1 in (1.85 m)	190 lb (86 kg)	Fr	Glen St. Mary, FL
G	10	Max Landis	6 ft 2 in (1.88 m)	185 lb (84 kg)	RS Sr	Indianapolis, IN
G	12	Michael Calder	6 ft 2 in (1.88 m)	180 lb (82 kg)	Sr	Fort Lauderdale, FL
F	14	Filip Serwatka	6 ft 5 in (1.96 m)	211 lb (96 kg)	Fr	Elkhart, IN
G	21	Trevor Osborn	6 ft 0 in (1.83 m)	178 lb (81 kg)	Jr	Fort Wayne, IN
F	22	Xzavier Taylor	6 ft 6 in (1.98 m)	255 lb (116 kg)	Jr	Chicago, IL
G	23	Bryson Scott (I)	6 ft 1 in (1.85 m)	205 lb (93 kg)	Jr	Fort Wayne, IN
G	32	Kason Harrell	6 ft 2 in (1.88 m)	192 lb (87 kg)	Fr	Pittsburgh, PA
F	34	Racine Talla	6 ft 9 in (2.06 m)	195 lb (88 kg)	RS So	Dakar, Senegal
F	44	Joe Reed	6 ft 8 in (2.03 m)	225 lb (102 kg)	Sr	Greenwood, IN
C	45	Brent Calhoun	6 ft 9 in (2.06 m)	260 lb (118 kg)	RS Jr	Indianapolis, IN
C	50	Andrew Poulter	6 ft 10 in (2.08 m)	275 lb (125 kg)	RS Jr	New Braunfels, TX

Head coach

- Jon Coffman (Washington and Lee)

Assistant coach(es)

- Mark Downey (Charleston (WV))
- Ryan Sims (Indianapolis)
- Ben Botts (Purdue Fort Wayne)

Legend

- (C) Team captain
- (S) Suspended
- (I) Ineligible
- (W) Walk-on
- Injured
- Current redshirt

Roster

== Schedule ==
Date time, TV	Rank^{#}	Opponent^{#}	Result	Record	Site (attendance) city, state
Exhibition
11/06/2015*; 7:00 pm		Otterbein	W 99–55		Gates Sports Center (833); Fort Wayne, IN
Regular season
11/13/2015*; 8:30 pm, ESPN3		at Valparaiso	L 64–78	0–1	Athletics–Recreation Center (4,117); Valparaiso, IN
11/16/2015*; 7:30 pm		Manchester; Spartan Showcase	W 85–53	1–1	Gates Sports Center (1,204); Fort Wayne, IN
11/18/2015*; 8:00 pm		at Austin Peay	W 80–77	2–1	Dunn Center (1,715); Clarksville, TN
11/21/2015*; 2:30 pm		SIU Edwardsville	W 87–67	3–1	Memorial Coliseum (1,388); Fort Wayne, IN
11/24/2015*; 7:00 pm		at Miami (OH)	W 57–53	4–1	Millett Hall (1,224); Oxford, OH
11/27/2015*; 4:30 pm		vs. Jacksonville; Spartan Showcase	W 71–63	5–1	Greensboro Coliseum (1,383); Greensboro, NC
11/28/2015*; 7:00 pm		at UNC Greensboro; Spartan Showcase	W 64–58	6–1	Greensboro Coliseum (1,389); Greensboro, NC
11/29/2015*; 12:30 pm		vs. Navy; Spartan Showcase	L 53–75	6–2	Greensboro Coliseum (1,349); Greensboro, NC
12/03/2015*; 10:00 pm		at Cal Poly	W 75–73	7–2	Mott Athletic Center (1,465); San Luis Obispo, CA
12/05/2015*; 2:00 pm		at Utah	L 79–96	7–3	Jon M. Huntsman Center (12,241); Salt Lake City, UT
12/09/2015*; 7:00 pm		at Indiana	L 65–90	7–4	Assembly Hall (17,472); Bloomington, IN
12/12/2015*; 2:30 pm		Austin Peay	W 85–68	8–4	Memorial Coliseum (1,605); Fort Wayne, IN
12/19/2015*; 1:00 pm		Stetson	W 95–89	9–4	Memorial Coliseum (1,075); Fort Wayne, IN
12/22/2015*; 7:00 pm		at Western Michigan	W 89–86 ^{OT}	10–4	University Arena (2,676); Kalamazoo, MI
12/30/2015; 7:00 pm		Oral Roberts	W 90–84	11–4 (1–0)	Memorial Coliseum (1,368); Fort Wayne, IN
01/02/2016*; 7:00 pm		Purdue North Central	W 126–95	12–4	Memorial Coliseum (798); Fort Wayne, IN
01/06/2016; 7:00 pm		South Dakota	W 85–65	13–4 (2–0)	Memorial Coliseum (1,077); Fort Wayne, IN
01/09/2016; 6:00 pm		at Denver	W 65–64	14–4 (3–0)	Magness Arena (2,054); Denver, CO
01/14/2016; 8:00 pm		at South Dakota State	L 76–92	14–5 (3–1)	Frost Arena (2,496); Brookings, SD
01/16/2016; 2:00 pm		at Omaha	W 106–101 ^{OT}	15–5 (4–1)	Baxter Arena (2,220); Omaha, NE
01/21/2016; 7:00 pm		North Dakota State	W 79–74	16–5 (5–1)	Gates Sports Center (964); Fort Wayne, IN
01/23/2016; 7:00 pm		IUPUI	L 82–84	16–6 (5–2)	Gates Sports Center (1,530); Fort Wayne, IN
01/28/2016; 8:00 pm, ESPN3		at Oral Roberts	W 68–63	17–6 (6–2)	Mabee Center (2,895); Tulsa, OK
01/31/2016; 2:00 pm		Western Illinois	W 88–67	18–6 (7–2)	Gates Sports Center (1,079); Fort Wayne, IN
02/04/2016; 2:00 pm		at South Dakota	W 95–82	19–6 (8–2)	DakotaDome (1,510); Vermillion, SD
02/06/2016; 5:00 pm		at North Dakota State	L 46–62	19–7 (8–3)	Scheels Arena (3,230); Fargo, ND
02/13/2016; 7:00 pm		Denver	W 88–84	20–7 (9–3)	Gates Sports Center (1,248); Fort Wayne, IN
02/18/2016; 7:00 pm		South Dakota State	W 91–79	21–7 (10–3)	Gates Sports Center (1,452); Fort Wayne, IN
02/20/2016; 7:00 pm		Omaha; Homecoming	W 94–90	22–7 (11–3)	Gates Sports Center (1,832); Fort Wayne, IN
02/25/2016; 7:00 pm, ESPN3		at Western Illinois	W 87–75	23–7 (12–3)	Western Hall (1,213); Macomb, IL
02/27/2016; 7:00 pm, ESPN3		at IUPUI	L 77–80	23–8 (12–4)	Fairgrounds Coliseum (1,675); Indianapolis, IN
The Summit League tournament
03/05/2016; 7:00 pm, ESPN3	(1)	vs. (8) South Dakota; Quarterfinals	W 86–70	24–8	Premier Center (10,306); Sioux Falls, SD
03/07/2016; 7:00 pm, ESPN3	(1)	vs. (5) North Dakota State; Semifinals	L 68–69	24–9	Premier Center (9,735); Sioux Falls, SD
NIT
03/15/2016*; 10:00 pm, ESPN3	(7)	at (2) San Diego State; First round – South Carolina Bracket	L 55–79	24–10	Viejas Arena (8,324); San Diego, CA
*Non-conference game. (#) Tournament seedings in parentheses. All times are in Eastern Time.
