= 2015–16 Denver Pioneers men's basketball team =

American college basketball season

2015–16 Denver Pioneers men's basketball
- Conference: The Summit League
- Record: 16–15 (7–9 The Summit)
- Head coach: Joe Scott (9th season)
- Assistant coaches: John Fitzgerald; Nate Rohnert; Dan Ficke
- Home arena: Magness Arena

2015–16 Summit League men's basketball standings
	Conf.				Overall
Team	W		L	PCT	W		L	PCT
IPFW	12	–	4	.750	24	–	10	.706
South Dakota State †	12	–	4	.750	26	–	8	.765
Omaha	10	–	6	.625	18	–	14	.563
IUPUI	9	–	7	.563	13	–	19	.406
North Dakota State	8	–	8	.500	20	–	13	.606
Denver	7	–	9	.438	16	–	15	.516
Oral Roberts	6	–	10	.375	14	–	17	.452
South Dakota	5	–	11	.313	14	–	18	.438
Western Illinois	3	–	13	.188	10	–	17	.370
† 2016 Summit League Tournament winner

The 2015–16 Denver Pioneers men's basketball team represented the University of Denver during the 2015–16 NCAA Division I men's basketball season. The Pioneers, led by ninth year head coach Joe Scott, played their home games at Magness Arena and were members of The Summit League. They finished the season 16–15, 7–9 in Summit League play to finish in sixth place. They defeated Nebraska–Omaha in the quarterfinals of The Summit League tournament to advance to the semifinals where they lost to South Dakota State.

On March 11, head coach Joe Scott was fired. He finished at Denver with a nine year record of 146–132.

== Roster ==
Number	Name	Position	Height	Weight	Year	Hometown
2	Joe Rosga	Guard	6–3	185	Freshman	Saint Paul, Minnesota
3	Bradley George	Guard	6–2	190	Freshman	Houston, Texas
5	Jake Pemberton	Guard	6–3	185	Sophomore	Highlands Ranch, Colorado
10	Jake Holtzmann	Guard	6–6	190	Freshman	Parker, Colorado
13	C. J. Bobbitt	Forward	6–7	210	Freshman	Harker Heights, Texas
14	Duke Douglas	Guard	6–4	185	RS–Sophomore	New Orleans, Louisiana
15	Thomas Neff	Guard	6–5	195	Freshman	Arvada, Colorado
21	Bryant Rucker	Guard	6–0	185	Senior	Frisco, Texas
22	Josiah Dunn	Guard	6–2	177	Junior	Littleton, Colorado
24	Christian Mackey	Center	6–6	270	Sophomore	Kirtland, New Mexico
32	Abiola Akintola	Forward	6–6	195	Freshman	Melbourne, Australia
33	Nate Engesser	Guard	6–3	185	Senior	Colorado Springs, Colorado
35	Marcus Boyd	Guard	6–7	215	RS–Senior	Highlands Ranch, Colorado
44	Daniel Amigo	Center	6–10	250	Sophomore	El Paso, Texas

== Schedule ==
Date time, TV	Opponent	Result	Record	Site (attendance) city, state
Non-conference regular season
Nov 13, 2015*; 5:30 pm	vs. Milwaukee; Cable Car Classic	L 58–71	0–1	Leavey Center (1,552); Santa Clara, CA
Nov 14, 2015*; 9:00 pm	at Santa Clara; Cable Car Classic	W 55–33	1–1	Leavey Center (1,150); Santa Clara, CA
Nov 15, 2015*; 1:00 pm	vs. Lipscomb; Cable Car Classic	W 82–69	2–1	Leavey Center (1,314); Santa Clara, CA
Nov 18, 2015*; 7:00 pm	Utah Valley	W 75–62	3–1	Magness Arena (1,128); Denver, CO
Nov 25, 2015*; 4:00 pm	Idaho State	W 79–69	4–1	Magness Arena (1,039); Denver, CO
Nov 28, 2015*; 2:00 pm	South Alabama	W 69–56	5–1	Magness Arena (1,138); Denver, CO
Dec 2, 2015*; 7:00 pm, RTRM	Wyoming	L 52–68	5–2	Magness Arena (2,036); Denver, CO
Dec 5, 2015*; 2:00 pm, RTRM	Air Force	L 59–61	5–3	Magness Arena (3,547); Denver, CO
Dec 9, 2015*; 8:00 pm	at San Diego	W 59–47	6–3	Jenny Craig Pavilion (1,249); San Diego, CA
Dec 13. 2015*; 12:00 pm, RTRM	Weber State	W 69–68	7–3	Magness Arena (1,103); Denver, CO
Dec 16, 2015*; 7:00 pm, CET	at Northern Colorado	W 81–77	8–3	Bank of Colorado Arena (1,245); Greeley, CO
Dec 20, 2015*; 1:00 pm	Eastern Washington	L 58–74	8–4	Magness Arena (1,405); Denver, CO
Dec 22, 2015*; 8:00 pm	at UC Riverside	L 54–63	8–5	UC Riverside Student Recreation Center (373); Riverside, CA
The Summit League regular season
Jan 1, 2016; 6:00 pm	at South Dakota State	L 59–68	8–6 (0–1)	Frost Arena (2,543); Brookings, SD
Jan 3, 2016; 3:00 pm	at North Dakota State	L 49–75	8–7 (0–2)	Scheels Arena (2,422); Fargo, ND
Jan 6, 2016; 7:00 pm, RTRM	Oral Roberts	W 78–75	9–7 (1–2)	Magness Arena (1,039); Denver, CO
Jan 9, 2016; 4:00 pm	IPFW	L 64–65	9–8 (1–3)	Magness Arena (2,054); Denver, CO
Jan 14, 2016; 6:00 pm	at Western Illinois	W 76–69	10–8 (2–3)	Western Hall (916); Macomb, IL
Jan 16, 2016; 11:00 am, ESPN3	at IUPUI	L 61–76	10–9 (2–4)	Indiana Farmers Coliseum (1,140); Indianapolis, IN
Jan 21, 2016; 7:00 pm	Nebraska–Omaha	L 55–69	10–10 (2–5)	Magness Arena (1,078); Denver, CO
Jan 28, 2016; 7:00 pm	South Dakota	W 66–52	11–10 (3–5)	Magness Arena (1,102); Denver, CO
Jan 30, 2016; 2:00 pm, RTRM	South Dakota State	L 56–67	11–11 (3–6)	Magness Arena (3,020); Denver, CO
Feb 4, 2016; 7:00 pm	IUPUI	W 53–51	12–11 (4–6)	Magness Arena (1,135); Denver, CO
Feb 6, 2016; 12:00 pm	at Nebraska–Omaha	W 75–72	13–11 (5–6)	Baxter Arena (2,222); Omaha, NE
Feb 11, 2016; 7:00 pm	Western Illinois	L 60–63	13–12 (5–7)	Magness Arena (1,425); Denver, CO
Feb 14, 2016; 5:00 pm	at IPFW	L 84–88	13–13 (5–8)	Gates Sports Center (1,248); Fort Wayne, IN
Feb 19, 2016; 6:00 pm, ESPN3	at Oral Roberts	L 58–62	13–14 (5–9)	Mabee Center (3,587); Tulsa, OK
Feb 21, 2016; 1:00 pm, ESPN3	at South Dakota	W 76–71	14–14 (6–9)	DakotaDome (1,644); Vermillion, SD
Feb 27, 2016; 4:00 pm, RTRM	North Dakota State	W 70–59	15–14 (7–9)	Scheels Arena (2,876); Fargo, ND
The Summit League tournament
March 6, 2016; 7:30 pm, ESPN3	vs. Nebraska–Omaha; Quarterfinals	W 78–70	16–14	Premier Center (6,432); Sioux Falls, SD
March 7, 2016; 7:30 pm, ESPN3	vs. South Dakota State; Semifinals	L 53–54	16–15	Premier Center (9,735); Sioux Falls, SD
*Non-conference game. ^{#}Rankings from AP Poll. (#) Tournament seedings in parentheses. All times are in Mountain Time.
