= 2016 Summit League men's basketball tournament =

- Classification: Division I
- Season: 2015–16
- Teams: 8
- Site: Denny Sanford Premier Center; Sioux Falls, South Dakota
- Champions: South Dakota State (3rd title)
- Winning coach: Scott Nagy (3rd title)
- MVP: Mike Daum (South Dakota State)
- Attendance: 36,661
- Television: Midco Sport Network; ESPN2

2015–16 Summit League men's basketball standings
	Conf.				Overall
Team	W		L	PCT	W		L	PCT
IPFW	12	–	4	.750	24	–	10	.706
South Dakota State †	12	–	4	.750	26	–	8	.765
Omaha	10	–	6	.625	18	–	14	.563
IUPUI	9	–	7	.563	13	–	19	.406
North Dakota State	8	–	8	.500	20	–	13	.606
Denver	7	–	9	.438	16	–	15	.516
Oral Roberts	6	–	10	.375	14	–	17	.452
South Dakota	5	–	11	.313	14	–	18	.438
Western Illinois	3	–	13	.188	10	–	17	.370
† 2016 Summit League Tournament winner

The 2016 Summit League men's basketball tournament was the post-season men's basketball tournament for the Summit League. The tournament was held from March 5–8, 2016 at the Denny Sanford Premier Center in Sioux Falls, South Dakota. The winners of the tournament, South Dakota State, received an automatic bid to the 2016 NCAA tournament. This was South Dakota State's third championship in five years.

== Seeds ==
The top 8 teams in the final standings qualified for the tournament.

Teams were seeded by record within the conference, with a tiebreaker system to seed teams with identical conference records.

Seed	School	Conference	Tiebreaker #1	Tiebreaker #2
1	IPFW	12–4	1–1 vs. South Dakota State	2–0 vs. Omaha
2	South Dakota State	12–4	1–1 vs. IPFW	1–1 vs. Omaha
3	Omaha	10–6		
4	IUPUI	9–7		
5	North Dakota State	8–8		
6	Denver	7–9		
7	Oral Roberts	6–10		
8	South Dakota	5–11		

== Schedule ==
Session	Game	Time*	Matchup^{#}	Television
Quarterfinals – Saturday March 5, 2016
1	1	6:00 pm	#1 IPFW 86 vs #8 South Dakota 70	Midco Sport Network; ESPN3
1	2	8:30 pm	#2 South Dakota State 73 vs #7 Oral Roberts 70	Midco Sport Network; ESPN3
Quarterfinals – Sunday March 6, 2016
2	3	6:00 pm	#4 IUPUI 45 vs #5 North Dakota State 60	Midco Sport Network; ESPN3
2	4	8:30 pm	#3 Omaha 70 vs #6 Denver 78	Midco Sport Network; ESPN3
Semifinals – Monday March 7, 2016
3	7	6:00 pm	#1 IPFW 68 vs #5 North Dakota State 69	Midco Sport Network; ESPN3
3	8	8:30 pm	#2 South Dakota State 54 vs #6 Denver 53	Midco Sport Network; ESPN3
Final – Tuesday March 8, 2016
4	9	8:00 pm	#5 North Dakota State 59 vs. #2 South Dakota State 67	ESPN2
*Game times in CT. #-Rankings denote tournament seed

== Bracket ==
Quarterfinals; Saturday/Sunday March 5–6; Midco Sport Network
1	IPFW	86
8	South Dakota	70
4	IUPUI	45
5	North Dakota State	60
2	South Dakota State	73
7	Oral Roberts	70
3	Omaha	70
6	Denver	78

Semifinals; Monday March 7 Midco Sport Network
1	IPFW	68
5	North Dakota State	69
2	South Dakota State	54
6	Denver	53

Final; Tuesday March 8 ESPN2
5	North Dakota State	59
2	South Dakota State	67
