= 2015–16 Indiana Hoosiers men's basketball team =

American college basketball season

2015–16 Indiana Hoosiers men's basketball

Big Ten Regular Season Champions

NCAA tournament, Sweet Sixteen
- Conference: Big Ten Conference

Ranking
- Coaches: No. 9
- AP: No. 14
- Record: 27–8 (15–3 Big Ten)
- Head coach: Tom Crean (8th season)
- Assistant coaches: Tim Buckley (8th season); Chuck Martin (2nd season); Rob Judson (1st season)
- Home arena: Assembly Hall

2015–16 Big Ten Conference men's basketball standings
	Conf.				Overall
Team	W		L	PCT	W		L	PCT
No. 14 Indiana	15	–	3	.833	27	–	8	.771
No. 2 Michigan State †	13	–	5	.722	29	–	6	.829
No. 18 Maryland	12	–	6	.667	27	–	9	.750
No. 12 Purdue	12	–	6	.667	26	–	9	.743
No. 25 Iowa	12	–	6	.667	22	–	11	.667
Wisconsin	12	–	6	.667	22	–	13	.629
Ohio State	11	–	7	.611	21	–	14	.600
Michigan	10	–	8	.556	23	–	13	.639
Northwestern	8	–	10	.444	20	–	12	.625
Penn State	7	–	11	.389	16	–	16	.500
Nebraska	6	–	12	.333	16	–	18	.471
Illinois	5	–	13	.278	15	–	19	.441
Minnesota	2	–	16	.111	11	–	20	.355
Rutgers	1	–	17	.056	7	–	25	.219
† 2016 Big Ten tournament winner Rankings from AP poll

The 2015–16 Indiana Hoosiers men's basketball team represented Indiana University in the 2015–16 NCAA Division I men's basketball season. Their head coach was Tom Crean, who was in his eighth season with the Hoosiers. The team played its home games at Assembly Hall in Bloomington, Indiana, as a member of the Big Ten Conference.

This season marked the 40th anniversary of the 32–0 and National Championship 1975–76 Hoosiers team, a feat still unrivaled. To commemorate the anniversary, players' jerseys featured a patch on the back. The Hoosiers also held a public recognition of the undefeated team during halftime of the home game against Wisconsin on January 5, at which the announcement was made that a statue of the seniors and starters would be erected outside the south entrance of Assembly Hall. A new banner was revealed honoring the '76 team as NCAA's #1 All-Time March Madness Team. Tom Abernethy and Bobby Wilkerson, two players from the team, were inducted into the IU Athletics Hall of Fame.

IU's season-opener victory against Eastern Illinois was a milestone game, as it marked 1,000 home wins in Indiana basketball history. IU finished the regular season by winning their 22nd conference title, tying them with in-state rival, Purdue, for the most conference titles.

Indiana finished the season 27–8 overall, 15–3 in the Big Ten to win the Big Ten regular season title outright. They received the #1 seed in the 2016 Big Ten men's basketball tournament, where they made an early quarterfinals exit by losing to Michigan. The Hoosiers received an at-large bid to the NCAA tournament. Indiana defeated Chattanooga and Kentucky to advance to the Sweet Sixteen for the third time in five years; however, in the Sweet Sixteen they fell to the North Carolina Tar Heels, 101–86.

== Previous season ==
The 2014–15 Hoosiers went 20–14 overall and 9–9 in the Big Ten Conference (tying for seventh place). Much of the Hoosiers' difficulties were caused by a lack of defense and post presence. The Hoosiers improved over the 13–14 season, in which they did not appear in any postseason tournament, by being selected to play in the NCAA Tournament as a #10 seed in the Midwest region. They made an early exit as the #7 Wichita State Shockers knocked them off in the second round.

Following the season, assistant coach Steve McClain was hired as the new head coach at the University of Illinois-Chicago. Tom Crean named Rob Judson, who spent the 2014–15 season as Indiana's director of basketball operations, as McClain's replacement.

== Preseason ==
=== Departures ===
Indiana departures
Name	Number	Pos.	Height	Weight	Year	Hometown	Reason for departure
Stanford Robinson	22	SG	6'4"	205	Sophomore	Landover, Maryland	Transfer (Rhode Island)
Max Hoetzel	3	F	6'9"	220	Freshman	Calabasas, California	Transfer (San Diego State)
Jeremiah April	44	C	7'0"	240	Freshman	Phoenix, Arizona	Transfer (Trinity Valley CC)
Devin Davis	15	F	6'7"	230	Sophomore	Indianapolis, Indiana	Dismissed/transfer (Odessa College)
Hanner Mosquera-Perea	12	F	6'9"	225	Junior	Istmina, Colombia	Dismissed/transfer (East Tennessee State)
Emmitt Holt	25	F	6'7"	230	Sophomore	Webster, New York	Dismissed/transfer (Indian Hills CC)

=== Recruiting class ===
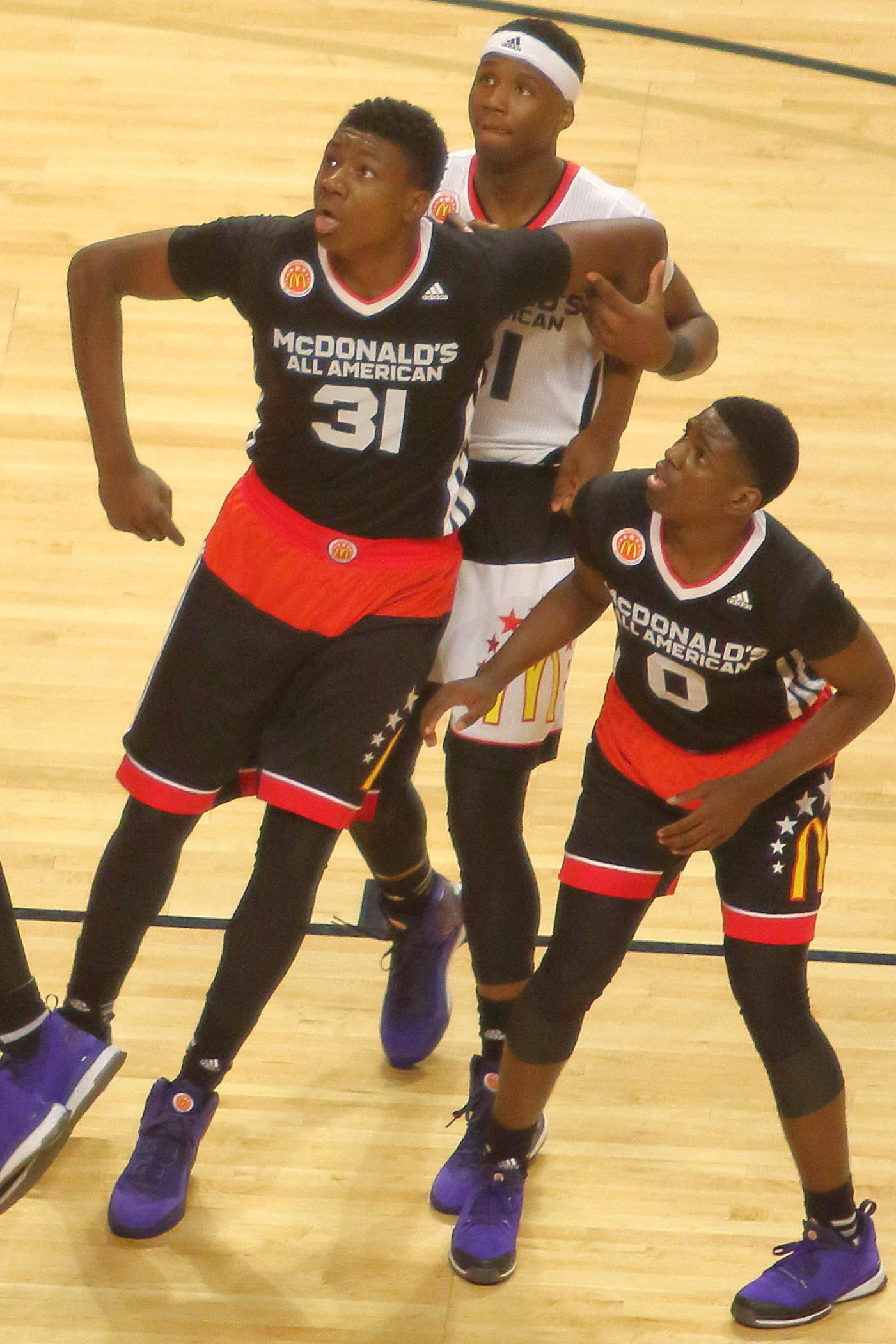
Thomas Bryant at the 2015 McDonald's All-American Boys Game

On April 4, 2015, McDonald's All-American and Jordan Brand All-Star Thomas Bryant committed to IU. With this commit, IU landed their fifth McDonald's All-American in a row, and secured a 6'10" rim-protector, which was something drastically missing from the previous season. Bryant made the announcement live on ESPN during the Dick's National Tournament.

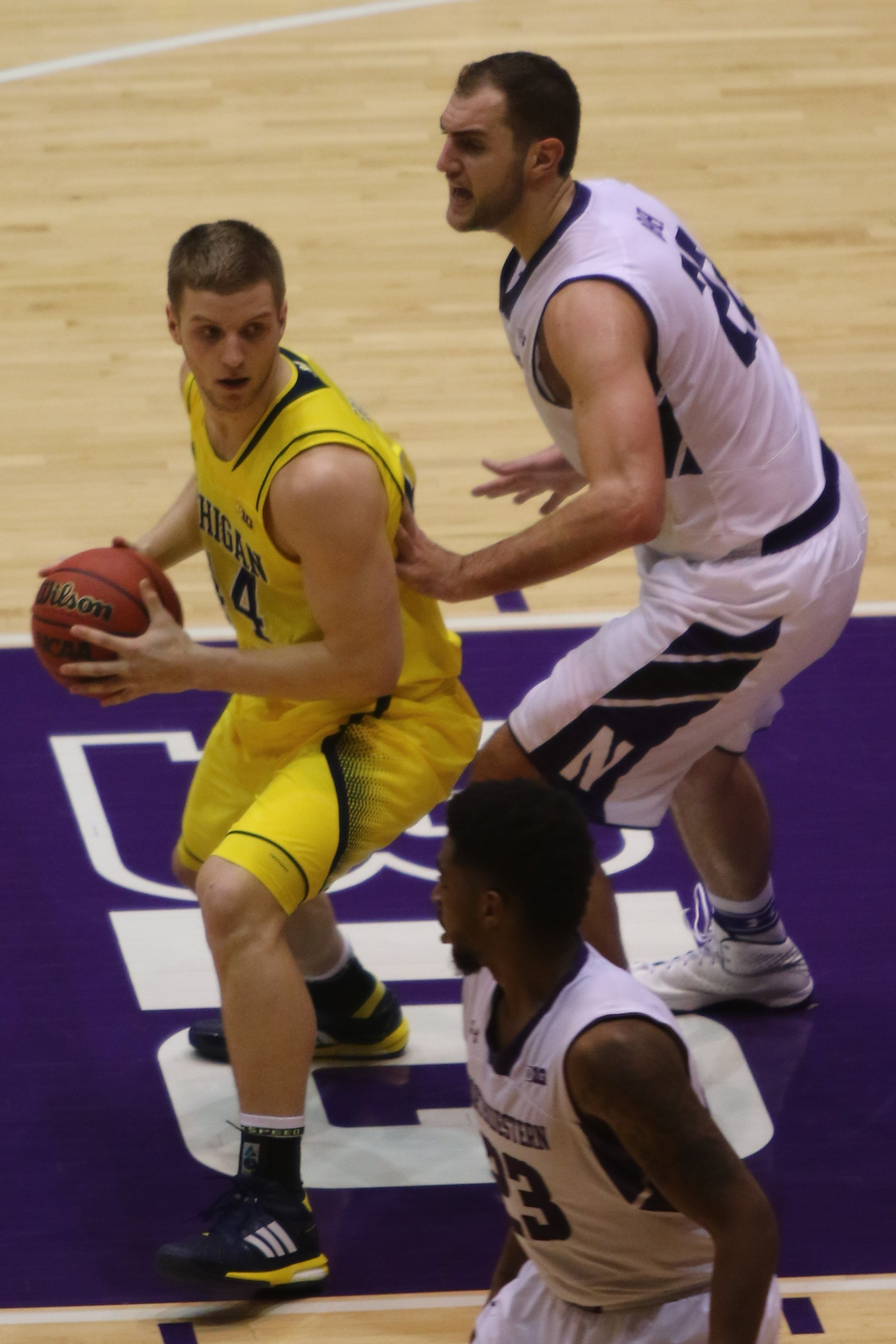
Max Bielfeldt transferred from Michigan.

In addition to the three high school recruits, Indiana received a commitment from Michigan graduate transfer Max Bielfeldt. The senior forward was eligible immediately to play for the Hoosiers.

A late addition of junior Pittsburgh transfer Josh Newkirk filled IU's last 2015–16 scholarship. Due to transfer rules and rehabilitating a knee injury from May, Newkirk would sit out the '15–'16 season. He would have two remaining seasons of eligibility left.

College recruiting
Name	Hometown	School	Height	Weight	Commit date
Juwan Morgan; F	Waynesville, MO	Waynesville HS	6 ft 8 in (2.03 m)	220 lb (100 kg)	Sep 10, 2014
Juwan Morgan; F	Recruit ratings: Scout: Rivals: 247Sports: ESPN:				
OG Anunoby; F	Jefferson City, MO	Jefferson City HS	6 ft 7 in (2.01 m)	200 lb (91 kg)	Oct 14, 2014
OG Anunoby; F	Recruit ratings: Scout: Rivals: 247Sports: ESPN:				
Thomas Bryant; F	Rochester, NY	Huntington Prep	6 ft 10 in (2.08 m)	220 lb (100 kg)	Apr 4, 2015
Thomas Bryant; F	Recruit ratings: Scout: Rivals: 247Sports: ESPN:				
Overall recruit ranking: Scout: N/A Rivals: 26 247Sports: 24 ESPN: 26
Note: In many cases, Scout, Rivals, 247Sports, On3, and ESPN may conflict in their listings of height and weight.; In these cases, the average was taken. ESPN grades are on a 100-point scale.; Sources: "2015 Team Ranking". Rivals.

== Roster ==
2015–16 Indiana Hoosiers men's basketball team
Players
Coaches

Pos.	#	Name	Height	Weight	Year	Previous school	Hometown
F	0	Max Bielfeldt	6 ft 8 in (2.03 m)	240 lb (109 kg)	GS	Peoria Notre Dame HS / Michigan	Peoria, Illinois
G	1	James Blackmon Jr.	6 ft 4 in (1.93 m)	190 lb (86 kg)	So	Marion High School	Fort Wayne, Indiana
G	2	Nick Zeisloft	6 ft 4 in (1.93 m)	190 lb (86 kg)	RS Sr	Lyons Township HS / Illinois St	La Grange, Illinois
F	3	OG Anunoby	6 ft 8 in (2.03 m)	215 lb (98 kg)	Fr	Jefferson City High School	Jefferson City, Missouri
G	4	Robert Johnson	6 ft 3 in (1.91 m)	195 lb (88 kg)	So	Benedictine High School	Richmond, Virginia
F	5	Troy Williams	6 ft 7 in (2.01 m)	215 lb (98 kg)	Jr	Oak Hill Academy	Hampton, Virginia
F	10	Ryan Burton (W)	6 ft 7 in (2.01 m)	220 lb (100 kg)	RS Sr	Bedford North Lawrence HS / Bellarmine	Bedford, Indiana
G	11	Yogi Ferrell (C)	6 ft 0 in (1.83 m)	180 lb (82 kg)	Sr	Park Tudor School	Indianapolis, Indiana
G	12	Josh Newkirk (redshirt)	6 ft 1 in (1.85 m)	185 lb (84 kg)	Jr	Word of God Christian Academy / Pittsburgh	Raleigh, North Carolina
F	13	Juwan Morgan	6 ft 7 in (2.01 m)	205 lb (93 kg)	Fr	Waynesville High School	Waynesville, Missouri
G	15	Harrison Niego (W)	6 ft 2 in (1.88 m)	185 lb (84 kg)	Fr	Lyons Township High School	Western Springs, Illinois
G	22	Quentin Taylor (W)	6 ft 2 in (1.88 m)	180 lb (82 kg)	Fr	Brebeuf Jesuit Prep School	Indianapolis, Indiana
G	24	Jackson Tharp	6 ft 4 in (1.93 m)	205 lb (93 kg)	Sr	Zionsville Community High School	Zionsville, Indiana
F	30	Collin Hartman	6 ft 6 in (1.98 m)	220 lb (100 kg)	Jr	Cathedral High School	Indianapolis, Indiana
C	31	Thomas Bryant	6 ft 10 in (2.08 m)	245 lb (111 kg)	Fr	Huntington Prep School	Rochester, New York
C	35	Tim Priller	6 ft 9 in (2.06 m)	225 lb (102 kg)	So	Richland High School	North Richland Hills, Texas

Head coach

- Tom Crean

Assistant coach(es)

- Tim Buckley
- Chuck Martin
- Rob Judson

Legend

- (C) Team captain
- (S) Suspended
- (I) Ineligible
- (W) Walk-on
- Injured
- Current redshirt

Roster
Last update: 3-09-2016

== Schedule ==
Date time, TV	Rank^{#}	Opponent^{#}	Result	Record	High points	High rebounds	High assists	Site (attendance) city, state
Exhibition
Nov 3*; 7:00 pm	No. 15	Ottawa	W 82–54		15 – Blackmon, Jr.	11 – Bryant	6 – Blackmon, Jr.	Assembly Hall (17,302); Bloomington, IN
Nov 9*; 7:00 pm	No. 15	Bellarmine	W 73–62		21 – Ferrell	8 – Tied	4 – Ferrell	Assembly Hall (17,174); Bloomington, IN
Non-conference regular season
Nov 13*; 7:00 pm	No. 15	Eastern Illinois	W 88–49	1–0	17 – Blackmon, Jr.	9 – Bryant	6 – Ferrell	Assembly Hall (17,472); Bloomington, IN
Nov 16*; 7:00 pm, BTN	No. 14	Austin Peay; Maui Invitational; Opening Round	W 102–76	2–0	22 – Ferrell	6 – Tied	9 – Ferrell	Assembly Hall (17,472); Bloomington, IN
Nov 19*; 7:00 pm, BTN	No. 14	Creighton; Gavitt Tipoff Games	W 86–65	3–0	19 – Blackmon, Jr.	9 – Ferrell	6 – Ferrell	Assembly Hall (17,472); Bloomington, IN
Nov 23*; 5:00 pm, ESPN2	No. 13	vs. Wake Forest; Maui Invitational Quarterfinals	L 78–82	3–1	16 – Williams	8 – Bryant	5 – Ferrell	Lahaina Civic Center (2,400); Lahaina, HI
Nov 24*; 2:00 pm, ESPN2	No. 13	vs. St. John's; Maui Invitational; Consolation Second Round	W 83–73	4–1	22 – Ferrell	9 – Williams	7 – Ferrell	Lahaina Civic Center (2,400); Lahaina, HI
Nov 25*; 5:00 pm, ESPN2	No. 13	vs. UNLV; Maui Invitational; Fifth Place Game	L 69–72	4–2	17 – Zeisloft	7 – Blackmon, Jr.	9 – Ferrell	Lahaina Civic Center (2,400); Lahaina, HI
Nov 30*; 7:00 pm, BTN		Alcorn State	W 112–70	5–2	33 – Blackmon, Jr.	8 – Williams	6 – Johnson	Assembly Hall (17,472); Bloomington, IN
Dec 2*; 9:15 pm, ESPN		at No. 7 Duke; ACC–Big Ten Challenge	L 74–94	5–3	17 – Williams	6 – Johnson	5 – Ferrell	Cameron Indoor Stadium (9,314); Durham, NC
Dec 5*; 7:00 pm, BTN		Morehead State	W 92–59	6–3	16 – Williams	6 – Bryant	7 – Ferrell	Assembly Hall (17,472); Bloomington, IN
Dec 9*; 7:00 pm		IPFW	W 90–65	7–3	38 – Ferrell	19 – Williams	5 – Ferrell	Assembly Hall (17,472); Bloomington, IN
Dec 12*; 6:30 pm, BTN		McNeese State	W 105–60	8–3	24 – Blackmon, Jr.	9 – Bryant	7 – Ferrell	Assembly Hall (17,472); Bloomington, IN
Dec 19*; 2:00 pm, ESPN2		vs. Notre Dame; Crossroads Classic	W 80–73	9–3	18 – Williams	10 – Williams	3 – Tied	Bankers Life Fieldhouse (19,156); Indianapolis, IN
Dec 22*; 6:00 pm, BTN		Kennesaw State	W 99–72	10–3	20 – Tied	5 – Tied	6 – Williams	Assembly Hall (15,721); Bloomington, IN
Big Ten regular season
Dec 30; 1:00 pm, ESPN2		at Rutgers	W 79–72	11–3 (1–0)	20 – Ferrell	14 – Bielfeldt	7 – Ferrell	The RAC (6,002); Piscataway, NJ
Jan 2; 4:00 pm, BTN		at Nebraska	W 79–69	12–3 (2–0)	24 – Ferrell	6 – Bielfeldt	7 – Ferrell	Pinnacle Bank Arena (13,831); Lincoln, NE
Jan 5; 7:00 pm, ESPN		Wisconsin	W 59–58	13–3 (3–0)	19 – Ferrell	7 – Tied	3 – Tied	Assembly Hall (14,098); Bloomington, IN
Jan 10; 1:30 pm, CBS		Ohio State	W 85–60	14–3 (4–0)	23 – Williams	13 – Bryant	6 – Tied	Assembly Hall (16,382); Bloomington, IN
Jan 16; 12:30 pm, BTN		at Minnesota	W 70–63	15–3 (5–0)	20 – Ferrell	8 – Williams	7 – Ferrell	Williams Arena (11,176); Minneapolis, MN
Jan 19; 7:00 pm, ESPN	No. 25	Illinois; Rivalry	W 103–69	16–3 (6–0)	21 – Williams	8 – Bielfeldt	9 – Ferrell	Assembly Hall (17,472); Bloomington, IN
Jan 23; 12:00 pm, ESPN2	No. 25	Northwestern	W 89–57	17–3 (7–0)	17 – Ferrell	7 – Williams	6 – Ferrell	Assembly Hall (17,472); Bloomington, IN
Jan 26; 7:00 pm, ESPN	No. 19	at Wisconsin	L 79–82 ^{OT}	17–4 (7–1)	30 – Ferrell	7 – Tied	3 – Johnson	Kohl Center (17,287); Madison, WI
Jan 30; 2:15 pm, BTN	No. 19	Minnesota	W 74–68	18–4 (8–1)	23 – Bryant	8 – Tied	3 – Tied	Assembly Hall (17,472); Bloomington, IN
Feb 2; 9:00 pm, ESPN	No. 22	at Michigan	W 80–67	19–4 (9–1)	17 – Ferrell	7 – Bielfeldt	9 – Ferrell	Crisler Center (12,312); Ann Arbor, MI
Feb 6; 8:00 pm, BTN	No. 22	at Penn State	L 63–68	19–5 (9–2)	14 – Zeisloft	8 – Bryant	5 – Tied	Bryce Jordan Center (10,351); University Park, PA
Feb 11; 9:00 pm, ESPN		No. 4 Iowa	W 85–78	20–5 (10–2)	14 – Ferrell	7 – Tied	2 – Tied	Assembly Hall (17,472); Bloomington, IN
Feb 14; 1:00 pm, CBS		at No. 8 Michigan State	L 69–88	20–6 (10–3)	15 – Bielfeldt	10 – Bielfeldt	7 – Ferrell	Breslin Center (14,797); East Lansing, MI
Feb 17; 8:30 pm, BTN	No. 22	Nebraska	W 80–64	21–6 (11–3)	18 – Williams	6 – Anunoby	4 – Ferrell	Assembly Hall (17,472); Bloomington, IN
Feb 20; 8:30 pm, ESPN	No. 22	No. 17 Purdue; Rivalry/Indiana National Guard Governor's Cup	W 77–73	22–6 (12–3)	19 – Williams	6 – Bielfeldt	4 – Ferrell	Assembly Hall (17,472); Bloomington, IN
Feb 25; 9:00 pm, ESPN	No. 18	at Illinois; Rivalry	W 74–47	23–6 (13–3)	27 – Ferrell	8 – Bryant	5 – Ferrell	State Farm Center (12,857); Champaign, IL
Mar 1; 9:00 pm, ESPN	No. 12	at No. 16 Iowa	W 81–78	24–6 (14–3)	20 – Ferrell	10 – Bryant	5 – Ferrell	Carver-Hawkeye Arena (15,400); Iowa City, IA
Mar 6; 4:30 pm, CBS	No. 12	No. 14 Maryland	W 80–62	25–6 (15–3)	23 – Williams	8 – Bryant	4 – Ferrell	Assembly Hall (17,472); Bloomington, IN
Big Ten tournament
Mar 11; 12:00 pm, ESPN	(1) No. 10	vs. (8) Michigan; Quarterfinals	L 69–72	25–7	16 – Williams	7 – Bryant	8 – Ferrell	Bankers Life Fieldhouse (18,355); Indianapolis, IN
NCAA tournament
Mar 17*; 7:10 pm, CBS	(5 E) No. 14	vs. (12 E) Chattanooga; First Round	W 99–74	26–7	20 – Ferrell	8 – Williams	10 – Ferrell	Wells Fargo Arena (16,774); Des Moines, IA
Mar 19*; 5:15 pm, CBS	(5 E) No. 14	vs. (4 E) No. 10 Kentucky; Second Round/Rivalry	W 73–67	27–7	19 – Bryant	5 – Tied	4 – Ferrell	Wells Fargo Arena (16,824); Des Moines, IA
Mar 25*; 9:57 pm, TBS	(5 E) No. 14	vs. (1 E) No. 3 North Carolina; Sweet Sixteen	L 86–101	27–8	25 – Ferrell	8 – Bryant	4 – Ferrell	Wells Fargo Center (20,686); Philadelphia, PA
*Non-conference game. ^{#}Rankings from AP Poll. (#) Tournament seedings in parentheses. E=East Region. All times are in Eastern Time.

== Player statistics ==
Individual player statistics (final)
			Minutes		Scoring		Total FGs			3-point FGs			Free-throws			Rebounds							
Player	GP	GS	Tot	Avg	Pts	Avg	FG	FGA	Pct	3FG	3FA	Pct	FT	FTA	Pct	Off	Def	Tot	Avg	A	TO	Blk	Stl
Anunoby, OG	34	0	466	13.7	165	4.9	66	116	.569	13	29	.448	20	42	.476	42	48	90	2.6	18	28	26	27
Bielfeldt, Max	35	5	612	17.5	286	8.2	113	219	.516	29	64	.453	31	44	.705	59	99	158	4.5	25	39	16	29
Blackmon Jr., James	13	12	319	24.5	206	15.8	73	152	.480	37	80	.463	23	27	.852	17	37	54	4.2	22	25	5	16
Bryant, Thomas	35	35	791	22.6	415	11.9	157	230	.683	5	15	.333	96	136	.706	70	132	202	5.8	34	58	32	17
Burton, Ryan	22	0	77	3.5	14	0.6	5	9	.556	4	7	.571	0	1	.000	3	7	10	0.5	1	1	0	1
Ferrell, Yogi	35	35	1215	34.7	607	17.3	196	428	.458	79	188	.420	136	164	.829	34	99	133	3.8	195	88	1	38
Hartman, Collin	35	24	765	21.9	175	5.0	65	144	.451	29	81	.358	16	19	.842	35	74	109	3.1	60	37	10	28
Johnson, Robert	30	22	747	24.9	242	8.1	84	187	.449	51	114	.447	23	36	.639	12	88	100	3.3	94	51	5	19
Morgan, Juwan	30	0	273	9.1	71	2.4	21	41	.512	5	11	.455	24	30	.800	23	41	64	2.1	5	15	11	9
Niego, Harrison	23	0	110	4.8	11	0.5	4	13	.308	2	8	.250	1	3	.333	5	10	15	0.7	6	4	0	7
Priller, Tim	11	0	17	1.5	4	0.4	1	3	.333	0	2	.000	2	2	1.000	3	2	5	0.5	0	1	0	2
Taylor, Quentin	7	0	9	1.3	3	0.4	1	2	.500	0	0		1	2	.500	0	2	2	0.3	0	0	0	0
Tharp, Jackson	4	0	5	1.3	0	0.0	0	0		0	0		0	0		0	0	0		1	1	0	0
Williams, Troy	35	34	916	26.2	464	13.3	163	318	.513	26	75	.347	112	162	.691	50	154	204	5.8	70	93	28	39
Zeisloft, Nick	35	8	703	20.1	228	6.5	72	172	.419	65	156	.417	19	21	.905	11	46	57	1.6	29	17	3	7
Total	35		7050		2891	95.3	1021	2034	.502	345	830	.416	504	689	.731	364	839	1203	38.8	560	458	137	239
Opponents	35		7050		2447	69.9	905	2037	.444	218	636	.343	419	615	.681	361	698	1164	33.3	424	458	106	215

Legend
GP	Games played	GS	Games started	Avg	Average per game
FG	Field-goals made	FGA	Field-goal attempts	Off	Offensive rebounds
Def	Defensive rebounds	A	Assists	TO	Turnovers
Blk	Blocks	Stl	Steals	High	Team high

== Rankings ==
Ranking movements Legend: ██ Increase in ranking ██ Decrease in ranking — = Not ranked RV = Received votes
	Week																			
Poll	Pre	2	3	4	5	6	7	8	9	10	11	12	13	14	15	16	17	18	19	Final
AP	15	14	13	RV	RV	—	—	—	RV	RV	25	19	22	RV	22	18	12	10	14	N/A
Coaches	15	15	14	RV	RV	RV	RV	RV	RV	25	23	17	21	22	21	15	11	10	12	9

== See also ==
- 2015–16 Indiana Hoosiers women's basketball team
