= 2015–16 Minnesota Golden Gophers men's basketball team =

American college basketball season

2015–16 Minnesota Golden Gophers men's basketball
- Conference: Big Ten Conference
- Record: 8–23 (2–16 Big Ten)
- Head coach: Richard Pitino (3rd season)
- Assistant coaches: Ben Johnson; Nate Pomeday; Kimani Young
- Home arena: Williams Arena

2015–16 Big Ten Conference men's basketball standings
	Conf.				Overall
Team	W		L	PCT	W		L	PCT
No. 14 Indiana	15	–	3	.833	27	–	8	.771
No. 2 Michigan State †	13	–	5	.722	29	–	6	.829
No. 18 Maryland	12	–	6	.667	27	–	9	.750
No. 12 Purdue	12	–	6	.667	26	–	9	.743
No. 25 Iowa	12	–	6	.667	22	–	11	.667
Wisconsin	12	–	6	.667	22	–	13	.629
Ohio State	11	–	7	.611	21	–	14	.600
Michigan	10	–	8	.556	23	–	13	.639
Northwestern	8	–	10	.444	20	–	12	.625
Penn State	7	–	11	.389	16	–	16	.500
Nebraska	6	–	12	.333	16	–	18	.471
Illinois	5	–	13	.278	15	–	19	.441
Minnesota	2	–	16	.111	11	–	20	.355
Rutgers	1	–	17	.056	7	–	25	.219
† 2016 Big Ten tournament winner Rankings from AP poll

The 2015–16 Minnesota Golden Gophers men's basketball team represented the University of Minnesota in the 2015–16 NCAA Division I men's basketball season. Led by third year head coach Richard Pitino, the Golden Gophers were members of the Big Ten Conference and played their home games at Williams Arena in Minneapolis, Minnesota. They finished the season 8–23, 2–16 in Big Ten play to finish in 13th place. They lost in the first round of the Big Ten tournament to Illinois.

The season was marred by the suspensions of three players, Kevin Dorsey, Nate Mason and Dupree McBrayer, on March 1, 2016 for allegedly posting a sex video online. The players were suspended for the rest of the season.

== Previous season ==
The Golden Gophers finished the 2014–15 Season with a record of 18–15, 6–12 in Big Ten play to finish in a tie for 10th place. They won their first round game in the Big Ten tournament against Rutgers, but they lost their second round game to Ohio State.

== Departures ==
Name	Number	Pos.	Height	Weight	Year	Hometown	Notes
Andre Hollins	1	G	6'2"	195	Senior	Memphis, TN	Graduated
Deandre Mathieu	4	G	5'9"	170	Senior	Knoxville, TN	Graduated
Daquein McNeil	5	G	6'3"	195	Sophomore	Baltimore, MD	Suspended due to an assault
Kendal Shell	12	G	6'0"	185	Senior	St. Louis, MO	Graduated
Maurice Walker	15	F	6'10"	250	RS Senior	Scarborough, ON	Graduated
Elliott Eliason	55	C	6'11"	245	RS Senior	Chadron, NE	Graduated

=== Incoming transfers ===
Name	Number	Pos.	Height	Weight	Year	Hometown	Previous School
Davonte Fitzgerald	20	F	6'7"	209	Junior	Tucker, GA	Transferred from Texas A&M. Under NCAA transfer rules, Fitzgerald will have to sit out for the 2015–16 season. Will have two years of remaining eligibility.
Reggie Lynch	22	C	6'10"	255	Junior	Edina, MN	Transferred from Illinois State. Under NCAA transfer rules, Lynch will have to sit out for the 2015–16 season. Will have two years of remaining eligibility.

== Incoming recruits ==
College recruiting information
Name	Hometown	School	Height	Weight	Commit date
Jarvis Johnson; PG	Brooklyn Park, MN	De La Salle High School	6 ft 1 in (1.85 m)	185 lb (84 kg)	Sep 12, 2014
Jarvis Johnson; PG	Recruit ratings: Scout: Rivals: 247Sports: ESPN:				
Kevin Dorsey; PG	Port Tobacco, MD	Clinton Christian School	6 ft 0 in (1.83 m)	170 lb (77 kg)	Jul 12, 2014
Kevin Dorsey; PG	Recruit ratings: Scout: Rivals: 247Sports: ESPN:				
Dupree McBrayer; SG	Jamaica, NY	Sunrise Christian Academy	6 ft 3 in (1.91 m)	180 lb (82 kg)	Aug 23, 2014
Dupree McBrayer; SG	Recruit ratings: Scout: Rivals: 247Sports: ESPN:				
Jordan Murphy; SF	San Antonio, TX	William J. Brennan High School	6 ft 7 in (2.01 m)	220 lb (100 kg)	May 16, 2014
Jordan Murphy; SF	Recruit ratings: Scout: Rivals: 247Sports: ESPN:				
Ahmad Gilbert; SF	Philadelphia, PA	Constitution High School	6 ft 6 in (1.98 m)	180 lb (82 kg)	Apr 23, 2015
Ahmad Gilbert; SF	Recruit ratings: Scout: Rivals: 247Sports: ESPN:				
Overall recruit ranking:
Note: In many cases, Scout, Rivals, 247Sports, On3, and ESPN may conflict in their listings of height and weight.; In these cases, the average was taken. ESPN grades are on a 100-point scale.; Sources: "2015 Minnesota Signees". ESPN.; "2015 Team Ranking". Rivals.

=== 2016 Recruiting Class ===
College recruiting information (2016)
Name	Hometown	School	Height	Weight	Commit date
Michael Hurt; PF	Rochester, MN	John Marshall High School	6 ft 7 in (2.01 m)	185 lb (84 kg)	Jan 16, 2015
Michael Hurt; PF	Recruit ratings: Scout: Rivals: 247Sports: ESPN:				
Eric Curry; PF	Little Rock, AR	Southwest Christian Academy	6 ft 8 in (2.03 m)	215 lb (98 kg)	Sep 23, 2015
Eric Curry; PF	Recruit ratings: Scout: Rivals: 247Sports: ESPN:				
Overall recruit ranking:
Note: In many cases, Scout, Rivals, 247Sports, On3, and ESPN may conflict in their listings of height and weight.; In these cases, the average was taken. ESPN grades are on a 100-point scale.; Sources: "2016 Minnesota Signees". ESPN.; "2016 Team Ranking". Rivals.

== Roster ==
2015–16 Minnesota Golden Gophers men's basketball team
Players
Coaches

Pos.	#	Name	Height	Weight	Year	Previous school	Hometown
G	1	Dupree McBrayer (S)	6 ft 4 in (1.93 m)	175 lb (79 kg)	Fr	Sunrise Christian Academy	Queens, NY
G	2	Nate Mason (S)	6 ft 1 in (1.85 m)	185 lb (84 kg)	So	Arlington Country Day	Decatur, GA
F	3	Jordan Murphy	6 ft 6 in (1.98 m)	230 lb (104 kg)	Fr	Brennan	San Antonio, TX
G	4	Kevin Dorsey (S)	6 ft 0 in (1.83 m)	175 lb (79 kg)	Fr	Clinton Christian School	Waldorf, MD
G	10	Darin Haugh (W)	5 ft 10 in (1.78 m)	170 lb (77 kg)	RS Jr	Bethany Lutheran	Prior Lake, MN
G	12	Jarvis Johnson (injured)	6 ft 1 in (1.85 m)	185 lb (84 kg)	Fr	DeLaSalle	Minneapolis, MN
G	15	Stephon Sharp (W)	6 ft 3 in (1.91 m)	195 lb (88 kg)	Fr	Hopkins	Bloomington, MN
F	20	Davonte Fitzgerald (I) (redshirt)	6 ft 8 in (2.03 m)	205 lb (93 kg)	Jr	Tucker; Texas A&M	Atlanta, GA
C	21	Bakary Konaté	6 ft 11 in (2.11 m)	230 lb (104 kg)	So	Sunrise Christian Academy	Bamako, Mali
C	22	Reggie Lynch (I) (redshirt)	6 ft 9 in (2.06 m)	260 lb (118 kg)	Jr	Edina; Illinois State	Edina, MN
F	23	Charles Buggs	6 ft 9 in (2.06 m)	220 lb (100 kg)	RS Jr	Hargrave Military Academy	Arlington, TX
F	24	Joey King	6 ft 9 in (2.06 m)	235 lb (107 kg)	Sr	Eastview; Drake	Eagan, MN
G	25	Mike Lukashewich (W)	6 ft 3 in (1.91 m)	180 lb (82 kg)	So	Appleton North	Appleton, WI
G	32	Ahmad Gilbert	6 ft 6 in (1.98 m)	210 lb (95 kg)	Fr	Constitution	Philadelphia, PA
F	41	Gaston Diedhiou	6 ft 9 in (2.06 m)	230 lb (104 kg)	So	Canarias Academy	Dakar, Senegal

Head coach

- Richard Pitino (Providence)

Assistant coach(es)

- Ben Johnson (Minnesota)
- Nate Pomeday (Northwestern)
- Kimani Young (UTEP)

Legend

- (C) Team captain
- (S) Suspended
- (I) Ineligible
- (W) Walk-on
- Injured
- Current redshirt

Roster

== Schedule and results ==
Date time, TV	Rank^{#}	Opponent^{#}	Result	Record	Site (attendance) city, state
Exhibition
Nov 1, 2015*; 4:00 pm		Minnesota–Crookston	W 74–57		Williams Arena; Minneapolis, MN
Nov 6, 2015*; 7:00 pm		Southwest Minnesota State	W 81–64		Williams Arena; Minneapolis, MN
Non-conference regular season
Nov 13, 2015*; 8:00 pm		UMKC	W 76–58	1–0	Williams Arena (9,744); Minneapolis, MN
Nov 15, 2015*; 2:00 pm, BTN		Louisiana–Monroe	W 67–56	2–0	Williams Arena (9,915); Minneapolis, MN
Nov 19, 2015*; 10:30 am, ESPN2		vs. Temple; Puerto Rico Tip-Off quarterfinals	L 70–75	2–1	Roberto Clemente Coliseum (1,601); San Juan, PR
Nov 20, 2015*; 9:30 am, ESPNU		vs. Missouri State; Puerto Rico Tip-Off consolation round	W 74–69	3–1	Roberto Clemente Coliseum (1,814); San Juan, PR
Nov 22, 2015*; 1:30 pm, ESPNU		vs. Texas Tech; Puerto Rico Tip-Off 5th place game	L 68–81	3–2	Roberto Clemente Coliseum (1,492); San Juan, PR
Nov 27, 2015*; 2:00 pm, ESPN3		Nebraska–Omaha	W 93–90	4–2	Williams Arena (9,976); Minneapolis, MN
Nov 30, 2015*; 8:00 pm, ESPN2		Clemson; ACC–Big Ten Challenge	W 89–83	5–2	Williams Arena (10,229); Minneapolis, MN
Dec 5, 2015*; 2:00 pm		South Dakota	L 81–85 ^{2OT}	5–3	Williams Arena (10,754); Minneapolis, MN
Dec 8, 2015*; 7:00 pm, ESPN3		South Dakota State	L 70–84	5–4	Williams Arena (10,378); Minneapolis, MN
Dec 12, 2015*; 7:30 pm, BTN		vs. Oklahoma State; Sioux Falls Showcase	L 60–62	5–5	Sanford Pentagon (3,250); Sioux Falls, SD
Dec 16, 2015*; 7:00 pm, ESPN3		Chicago State	W 70–52	6–5	Williams Arena (10,175); Minneapolis, MN
Dec 23, 2015*; 7:00 pm, ESPN3		Milwaukee	L 65–74	6–6	Williams Arena (10,364); Minneapolis, MN
Big Ten regular season
Dec 30, 2015; 6:00 pm, BTN		at Ohio State	L 63–78	6–7 (0–1)	Value City Arena (13,701); Columbus, OH
Jan 2, 2016; 2:00 pm, ESPN2		No. 1 Michigan State	L 61–69	6–8 (0–2)	Williams Arena (12,836); Minneapolis, MN
Jan 5, 2016; 6:00 pm, BTN		at Penn State	L 77–86	6–9 (0–3)	Bryce Jordan Center (5,892); University Park, PA
Jan 9, 2016; 1:30 pm, BTN		Northwestern	L 52–77	6–10 (0–4)	Williams Arena (10,436); Minneapolis, MN
Jan 12, 2016; 8:00 pm, BTN		at Nebraska	L 59–84	6–11 (0–5)	Pinnacle Bank Arena (15,628); Lincoln, NE
Jan 16, 2016; 11:30 am, BTN		Indiana	L 63–70	6–12 (0–6)	Williams Arena (11,176); Minneapolis, MN
Jan 20, 2016; 7:30 pm, BTN		at Michigan	L 69–74	6–13 (0–7)	Crisler Center (11,726); Ann Arbor, MI
Jan 23, 2016; 7:30 pm, BTN		Illinois	L 71–76 ^{OT}	6–14 (0–8)	Williams Arena (11,026); Minneapolis, MN
Jan 27, 2016; 8:00 pm, BTN		No. 21 Purdue	L 64–68	6–15 (0–9)	Williams Arena (10,484); Minneapolis, MN
Jan 30, 2016; 1:15 pm, BTN		at No. 19 Indiana	L 68–74	6–16 (0–10)	Assembly Hall (17,472); Bloomington, IN
Feb 4, 2016; 8:00 pm, BTN		at Northwestern	L 58–84	6–17 (0–11)	Welsh-Ryan Arena (7,015); Evanston, IL
Feb 10, 2016; 8:00 pm, BTN		Michigan	L 74–82	6–18 (0–12)	Williams Arena (11,137); Minneapolis, MN
Feb 14, 2016; 6:30 pm, BTN		at No. 4 Iowa	L 71–75	6–19 (0–13)	Carver–Hawkeye Arena (15,400); Iowa City, IA
Feb 18, 2016; 7:00 pm, BTN		No. 6 Maryland	W 68–63	7–19 (1–13)	Williams Arena (10,768); Minneapolis, MN
Feb 23, 2016; 6:00 pm, BTN		Rutgers	W 83–61	8–19 (2–13)	Williams Arena (10,333); Minneapolis, MN
Feb 28, 2016; 7:00 pm, BTN		at Illinois	L 71–84	8–20 (2–14)	State Farm Center (12,008); Champaign, IL
Mar 2, 2016; 8:00 pm, BTN		Wisconsin	L 49–62	8–21 (2–15)	Williams Arena (12,275); Minneapolis, MN
Mar 5, 2016; 12:00 pm, BTN		at Rutgers	L 52–75	8–22 (2–16)	The RAC (4,473); Piscataway, NJ
Big Ten tournament
Mar 9, 2016; 3:30 pm, ESPN2	(13)	vs. (12) Illinois; First Round	L 52–85	8–23	Bankers Life Fieldhouse (16,528); Indianapolis, IN
*Non-conference game. ^{#}Rankings from AP Poll. (#) Tournament seedings in parentheses. All times are in Central Time.

== See also ==
- 2015–16 Minnesota Golden Gophers women's basketball team
