= Scheels Arena =

Multi-purpose venue in Fargo, North Dakota

Coordinates: 46.83559°N 96.87615°W

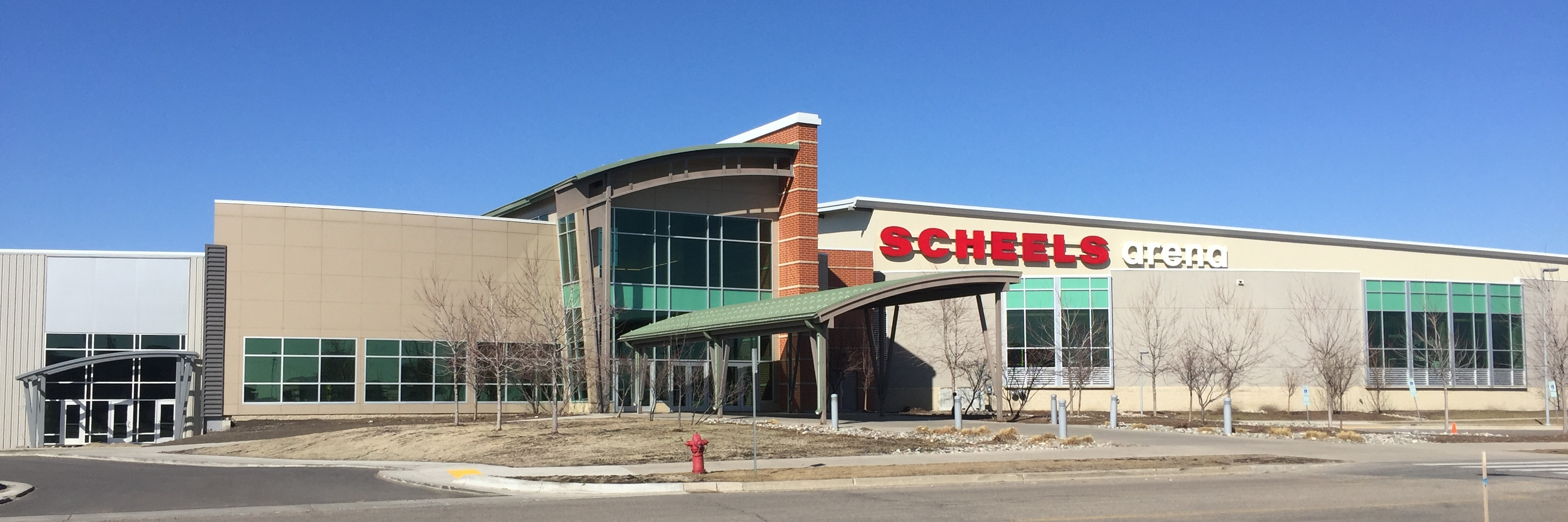
- Interactive map of Scheels Arena
- Former names: Urban Plains Center (2008–2010)
- Location: 5225 South 31st Ave; Fargo, ND 58104
- Owner: Metro Sports Foundation
- Operator: Metro Sports Foundation
- Capacity: 6,000 (Basketball); 5,000 (Ice Hockey)
- Surface: Multi-surface

Construction
- Groundbreaking: June 27, 2007
- Opened: October 30, 2008
- Cost: $25 million ($37.4 million in 2025 dollars)
- Architect: ICON Architectural Group
- Project manager: Gehrtz Construction Services
- Structural engineers: Sandman & Associates Consulting, PC
- General contractors: Olaf Anderson & Son Construction, Inc.

Tenants
- Fargo Force (USHL) (2008–present); North Dakota State Bison men's basketball (NCAA) (2014–2016)

Scheels Arena (formerly called The Urban Plains Center, or UPC) is a multi-purpose venue located in Fargo, North Dakota. It is part of the Sanford Health Athletic Park which comprises the arena, the Family Wellness Center (a partnership between Sanford Health and the YMCA), and the Sanford POWER Athletic Center. There are plans to add four additional ice sheets.

== History ==
The Urban Plains Center was constructed and opened in 2008. Before opening, the concrete foundation of the Arena was vandalized causing roughly $500,000 worth of damage and leading to 3 criminal arrests. It was renamed in 2010 after Scheels All Sports purchased the naming rights. The arena seats up to 6,000 for concerts, over 5,000 for ice hockey, and it holds 40 suites and 300 club seats. It features an NHL-sized ice sheet. The main tenant of the arena is the Fargo Force, who play in the United States Hockey League.

== Events ==
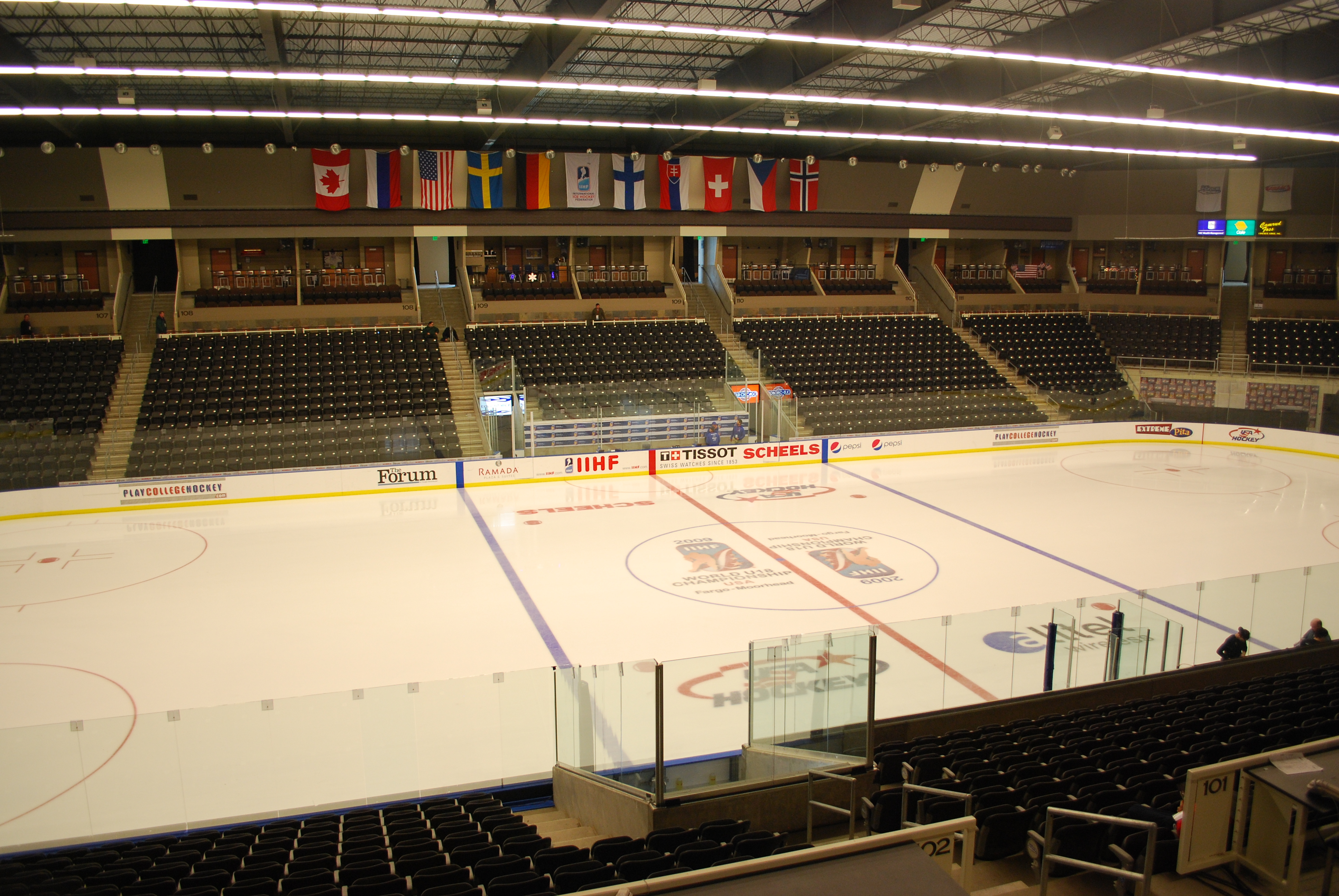
Scheel's Sports Arena

Other arena events have included Fargo-Moorhead high school hockey, the 2009 IIHF World U18 Championships, the 2011 US Curling Nationals for both men and women, the 2014 United States Olympic Curling Trials, the 2015 NCAA Men's Division I Ice Hockey Tournament West Regional, rodeos, and concerts.

The North Dakota State Bison men's basketball team played their home games at Scheels Arena for the 2014–15 and 2015–16 seasons while their previous arena, the Bison Sports Arena, was being remodeled.

In February 2016 the Arena hosted the funeral of slain Fargo Police Officer Jason David Moszer. An estimated 3,600 people were in attendance with an estimated 2,800 being law enforcement.

In June 2018 President Donald Trump held a rally at the Scheels Arena where he campaigned on behalf of Kevin Cramer and Kelly Armstrong. Trump spoke to an arena filled to capacity (6000 people) with supporters and protesters outside of the arena.

== Concerts ==
- Skillet 2010
- Red 2010
- Nelly 2011
- Wiz Khalifa 2012
- Florida Georgia Line
- Third Day 2013
- Newsboys 2016
- Lynyrd Skynyrd 2017
- Tech N9ne 2018
- Toby Keith 2018
- Kip Moore 2018
- Rascal Flatts 2018
- Kelsea Ballerini 2019
- Styx 2019
- REO Speedwagon 2019
- Justin Moore 2020
- For King & Country 2021
- Carrie Underwood 2022
