= 2016–17 Northern Kentucky Norse men's basketball team =

American college basketball season

2016–17 Northern Kentucky Norse men's basketball
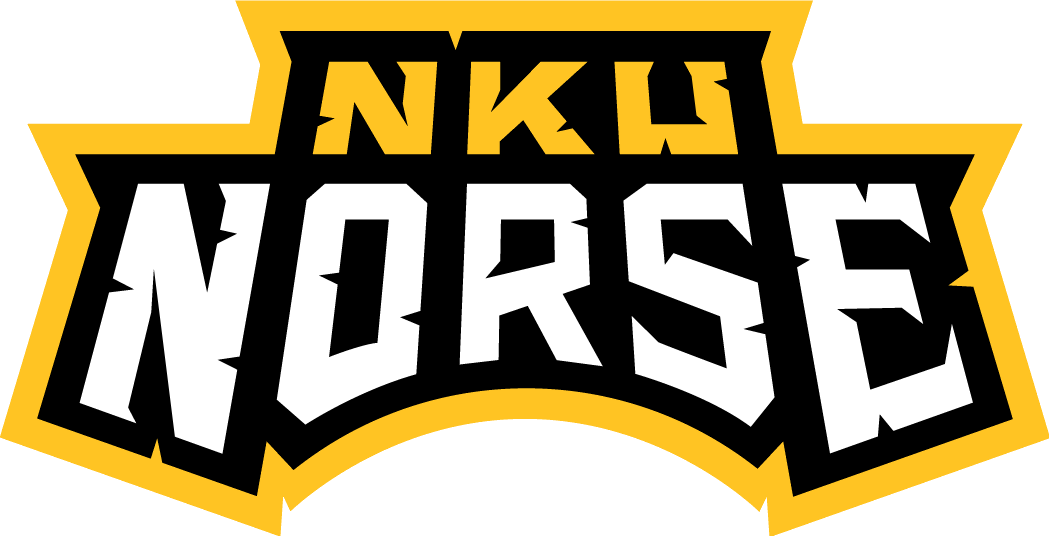

Horizon League tournament champions

NCAA tournament, First Round
- Conference: Horizon League
- Record: 24–11 (12–6 Horizon)
- Head coach: John Brannen (2nd season)
- Assistant coaches: Sean Dwyer; Tim Morris; Chris Shumate
- Home arena: BB&T Arena

2016–17 Horizon League men's basketball standings
| | Conf. | | | | Overall |
| Team | W | | L | PCT | W | | L | PCT |
|---|---|---|---|---|---|---|---|---|
| Oakland | 14 | – | 4 | .778 | 25 | – | 9 | .735 |
| Valparaiso | 14 | – | 4 | .778 | 24 | – | 9 | .727 |
| Green Bay | 12 | – | 6 | .667 | 18 | – | 14 | .563 |
| Northern Kentucky † | 12 | – | 6 | .667 | 24 | – | 11 | .686 |
| Wright State | 11 | – | 7 | .611 | 20 | – | 12 | .625 |
| UIC | 7 | – | 11 | .389 | 17 | – | 19 | .472 |
| Detroit | 6 | – | 12 | .333 | 8 | – | 23 | .258 |
| Cleveland State | 5 | – | 13 | .278 | 9 | – | 22 | .290 |
| Youngstown State | 5 | – | 13 | .278 | 13 | – | 21 | .382 |
| Milwaukee | 4 | – | 14 | .222 | 11 | – | 24 | .314 |
† 2017 Horizon League Tournament winner

The 2016–17 Northern Kentucky Norse men's basketball team represented Northern Kentucky University (NKU) during the 2016–17 NCAA Division I men's basketball season. The Norse, led by second-year head coach John Brannen, played their home games at BB&T Arena in Highland Heights, Kentucky as members of the Horizon League. They finished the season 24–11, 13–6 in Horizon League play to finish in a tie for third place. As the No. 4 seed in the Horizon League tournament, they defeated Wright State, Youngstown State, and Milwaukee to win the Horizon League tournament. They received the conference's automatic bid to the NCAA tournament in the school's first year of eligibility after its transition to a Division I school. They lost in the first round to Kentucky.

== Previous season ==
The Norse finished the 2015–16 season 9–21, 5–13 in Horizon League play to finish in eighth place. They lost in the first round of the Horizon League tournament to Milwaukee.

== Offseason ==
=== Departures ===
| Name | Number | Pos. | Height | Weight | Year | Hometown | Notes |
|---|---|---|---|---|---|---|---|
| Tyler White | 3 | G | 6'3" | 185 | Senior | Lima, OH | Graduated |
| Deontae Cole | 4 | F | 6'6" | 210 | Junior | Toledo, OH | Graduate transferred to Mount Vernon Nazarene |
| Jake Giesler | 20 | F | 6'7" | 235 | RS Senior | Fort Thomas, KY | Graduated |
| Jalen Billups | 21 | F/C | 6'6" | 245 | RS Senior | Cincinnati, OH | Graduated |
| Todd Johnson | 23 | G | 5'9" | 175 | Senior | Elkhart, IN | Graduated |
| Jared Bryant | 32 | F/C | 6'7" | 255 | RS Senior | Cincinnati, OH | Graduated |
| Skyler Kolli | 33 | G | 5'10" | 150 | Freshman | Indianapolis, IN | Walk-on; left the team for personal reasons |
| Dean Danos | 44 | G | 5'11" | 175 | Junior | Oak Lawn, IL | Left the team for personal reasons |

=== Incoming transfers ===
| Name | Number | Pos. | Height | Weight | Year | Hometown | Previous School |
|---|---|---|---|---|---|---|---|
| Brandon Maxwell | 2 | G | 6'1" | 175 | Sophomore | Orlando, FL | Junior college transferred from Daytona State College |

=== Recruiting class of 2016 ===
College recruiting information
| Name | Hometown | School | Height | Weight | Commit date |
|---|---|---|---|---|---|
| Carson Williams #53 SF | Owenton, KY | Owen County High School | 6 ft 5 in (1.96 m) | 185 lb (84 kg) | Aug 26, 2015 |
| Carson Williams #53 SF | Recruit ratings: Scout: Rivals: (73) | | | | |
| Blake Spellman; PG | Lee's Summit, MO | Lee's Summit High School | 6 ft 1 in (1.85 m) | 165 lb (75 kg) | Aug 10, 2015 |
| Blake Spellman; PG | Recruit ratings: Scout: Rivals: (NR) | | | | |
| Mason Faulkner; SG | Glasgow, KY | Caverna High School | 6 ft 3 in (1.91 m) | N/A | |
| Mason Faulkner; SG | Recruit ratings: Scout: Rivals: (NR) | | | | |
| Jalen Tate; SF | Pickerington, OH | Pickerington Central High School | 6 ft 5 in (1.96 m) | 180 lb (82 kg) | |
| Jalen Tate; SF | Recruit ratings: Scout: Rivals: (NR) | | | | |
| Dantez Walton; SF | Lima, OH | Lima Central Catholic High School | 6 ft 5 in (1.96 m) | N/A | |
| Dantez Walton; SF | Recruit ratings: Scout: Rivals: (NR) | | | | |
Overall recruit ranking:
Note: In many cases, Scout, Rivals, 247Sports, On3, and ESPN may conflict in their listings of height and weight.; In these cases, the average was taken. ESPN grades are on a 100-point scale.; Sources: "2016 Team Ranking". Rivals.

== Roster ==
2016–17 Northern Kentucky Norse men's basketball team
Players
Coaches

| Pos. | # | Name | Height | Weight | Year | Previous school | Hometown |
|---|---|---|---|---|---|---|---|
| F | 1 | Jordan Garnett | 6 ft 5 in (1.96 m) | 220 lb (100 kg) | Jr | Warren Central High School | Indianapolis, Indiana |
| G | 2 | Brandon Maxwell | 6 ft 2 in (1.88 m) | 190 lb (86 kg) | So | Daytona State College | Orlando, Florida |
| G | 3 | Blake Spellman | 5 ft 11 in (1.8 m) | 180 lb (82 kg) | Fr | Lee's Summit High School | Lee's Summit, Missouri |
| F | 4 | Jeff Garrett | 6 ft 6 in (1.98 m) | 220 lb (100 kg) | RS So | Alabama | Gadsden, Alabama |
| F | 5 | Jalen Tate | 6 ft 5 in (1.96 m) | 170 lb (77 kg) | Fr | Pickerington High School Central | Pickerington, Ohio |
| G | 10 | Tre Cobbs | 5 ft 10 in (1.78 m) | 185 lb (84 kg) | Fr | Lima Central Catholic High School | Lima, Ohio |
| G | 11 | Mason Faulkner | 6 ft 1 in (1.85 m) | 165 lb (75 kg) | Fr | Caverna High School | Glasgow, Kentucky |
| F | 13 | Brennan Gillis | 6 ft 7 in (2.01 m) | 215 lb (98 kg) | So | Ben Davis High School | Indianapolis, Indiana |
| G | 20 | Nick Ayers | 6 ft 3 in (1.91 m) | 190 lb (86 kg) | Jr | Simon Kenton High School | Independence, Kentucky |
| G | 22 | Matt Rosenwinkel (W) | 6 ft 2 in (1.88 m) | 230 lb (104 kg) | Sr | Rochelle Township High School | Rochelle, Illinois |
| F | 23 | Carson Williams | 6 ft 5 in (1.96 m) | 230 lb (104 kg) | Fr | Owen County High School | Owenton, Kentucky |
| G | 25 | Cole Murray | 6 ft 7 in (2.01 m) | 210 lb (95 kg) | Sr | Delphi Community High School | Delphi, Indiana |
| G | 30 | Lavone Holland II | 6 ft 1 in (1.85 m) | 185 lb (84 kg) | Jr | Coffeyville Community College | Louisville, Kentucky |
| G | 32 | Dantez Walton | 6 ft 5 in (1.96 m) | 205 lb (93 kg) | Fr | Lima Central Catholic High School | Lima, Ohio |
| F/C | 34 | Drew McDonald | 6 ft 7 in (2.01 m) | 250 lb (113 kg) | So | Newport Central Catholic High School | Cold Spring, Kentucky |

Head coach

- John Brannen (Marshall)

Assistant coach(es)

- Sean Dwyer (Michigan State)
- Tim Morris (Stanford)
- Chris Shumate (Murray State)

Legend

- (C) Team captain
- (S) Suspended
- (I) Ineligible
- (W) Walk-on
- Injured
- Current redshirt

Roster

== Schedule and results ==
| Date time, TV | Rank^{#} | Opponent^{#} | Result | Record | Site (attendance) city, state |
Exhibition
| 11/04/2016*; 8:00 pm | | Wilmington | W 102–54 | | BB&T Arena (1,750); Highland Heights, KY |
Non-conference regular season
| 11/11/2016*; 7:00 pm | | Earlham | W 95–56 | 1–0 | BB&T Arena (1,868); Highland Heights, KY |
| 11/13/2016*; 6:00 pm | | at Illinois | L 64–79 | 1–1 | State Farm Center (10,888); Champaign, IL |
| 11/18/2016*; 5:00 pm | | vs. Austin Peay; Tarkett Sports Classic | L 69–77 | 1–2 | Millett Hall; Oxford, OH |
| 11/19/2016*; 1:30 pm | | vs. Delaware; Tarkett Sports Classic | W 74–53 | 2–2 | Millett Hall; Oxford, OH |
| 11/20/2016*; 2:00 pm | | at Miami (OH); Tarkett Sports Classic | W 79–70 | 3–2 | Millett Hall (1,229); Oxford, OH |
| 11/26/2016*; 7:00 pm | | North Carolina Central | L 74–82 | 3–3 | BB&T Arena (2,141); Highland Heights, KY |
| 11/30/2016*; 7:00 pm | | at Morehead State | W 84–79 | 4–3 | Ellis Johnson Arena (3,110); Morehead, KY |
| 12/03/2016*; 6:00 pm | | at Norfolk State | W 72–61 | 5–3 | Joseph G. Echols Memorial Hall (1,261); Norfolk, VA |
| 12/07/2016*; 7:00 pm | | Eastern Illinois | W 80–70 | 6–3 | BB&T Arena (1,965); Highland Heights, KY |
| 12/10/2016*; 3:00 pm | | at Southeast Missouri State | W 80–66 | 7–3 | Show Me Center (1,379); Cape Girardeau, MO |
| 12/18/2016*; 1:00 pm, ESPN3 | | Eastern Washington | W 70–48 | 8–3 | BB&T Arena (2,026); Highland Heights, KY |
| 12/21/2016*; 7:00 pm, ESPN3 | | Brescia | W 97–73 | 9–3 | BB&T Arena (1,665); Highland Heights, KY |
| 12/23/2016*; 4:00 pm, RTPT | | at No. 11 West Virginia | L 61–92 | 9–4 | WVU Coliseum (10,197); Morgantown, WV |
Horizon League regular season
| 12/29/2016; 7:30 pm, ESPN3 | | at Detroit | W 81–70 | 10–4 (1–0) | Calihan Hall (1,299); Detroit, MI |
| 12/31/2016; 3:00 pm, ESPN3 | | at Oakland | L 65–76 | 10–5 (1–1) | Athletics Center O'rena (2,417); Rochester, MI |
| 01/05/2017; 7:30 pm, ESPN3 | | Youngstown State | W 83–70 | 11–5 (2–1) | BB&T Arena (2,632); Highland Heights, KY |
| 01/07/2017; 1:00 pm, ESPN3 | | Cleveland State | W 83–75 | 12–5 (3–1) | BB&T Arena (2,723); Highland Heights, KY |
| 01/10/2017; 8:00 pm, ESPN3 | | at Green Bay | L 71–80 | 12–6 (3–2) | Resch Center (2,063); Green Bay, WI |
| 01/12/2017; 8:00 pm, ESPN3 | | at Milwaukee | L 58–68 | 12–7 (3–3) | UW–Milwaukee Panther Arena (1,389); Milwaukee, WI |
| 01/20/2017; 7:00 pm | | Oakland | W 79–70 | 12–8 (3–4) | BB&T Arena (4,784); Highland Heights, KY |
| 01/22/2017; 1:00 pm | | Detroit | W 101–87 | 13–8 (4–4) | BB&T Arena (2,083); Highland Heights, KY |
| 01/27/2017; 8:00 pm | | at UIC | W 79–62 | 14–8 (5–4) | UIC Pavilion (2,898); Chicago, IL |
| 01/29/2017; 2:30 pm, ESPN3 | | at Valparaiso | L 58–65 | 14–9 (5–5) | Athletics–Recreation Center (3,578); Valparaiso, IN |
| 02/04/2017; 7:00 pm | | at Wright State | W 83–79 | 15–9 (6–5) | Nutter Center (5,993); Dayton, OH |
| 02/09/2017; 7:30 pm | | Green Bay | W 69–67 | 16–9 (7–5) | BB&T Arena (3,416); Highland Heights, KY |
| 02/11/2017; 7:00 pm, ESPN3 | | Milwaukee | W 69–63 | 17–9 (8–5) | BB&T Arena (4,963); Highland Heights, KY |
| 02/16/2017; 7:45 pm, ESPN3 | | at Cleveland State | W 62–60 | 18–9 (9–5) | Wolstein Center (1,247); Cleveland, OH |
| 02/18/2017; 7:00 pm, ESPN3 | | at Youngstown State | L 77–81 | 18–10 (9–6) | Beeghly Center (4,609); Youngstown, OH |
| 02/21/2017; 7:00 pm, ESPN3 | | Wright State | W 83–76 | 19–10 (10–6) | BB&T Arena (2,908); Highland Heights, KY |
| 02/24/2017; 7:30 pm, ESPN3 | | UIC | W 90–82 | 20–10 (11–6) | BB&T Arena (3,025); Highland Heights, KY |
| 02/26/2017; 1:00 pm, ESPN3 | | Valparaiso | W 82–78 | 21–10 (12–6) | BB&T Arena (3,304); Highland Heights, KY |
Horizon League tournament
| 03/05/2017; 7:30 pm, ESPN3 | (4) | vs. (5) Wright State; Quarterfinals | W 82–77 | 22–10 | Joe Louis Arena (5,654); Detroit, MI |
| 03/06/2017; 7:00 pm, ESPNU | (4) | vs. (9) Youngstown State; Semifinals | W 84–74 | 23–10 | Joe Louis Arena (3,708); Detroit, MI |
| 03/07/2017; 7:00 pm, ESPN | (4) | vs. (10) Milwaukee; Championship | W 59–53 | 24–10 | Joe Louis Arena (5,929); Detroit, MI |
NCAA tournament
| 03/19/2017; 10:07 pm, CBS | (15 S) | vs. (2 S) No. 5 Kentucky; First Round | L 70–79 | 24–11 | Bankers Life Fieldhouse (18,269); Indianapolis, IN |
*Non-conference game. ^{#}Rankings from AP Poll. (#) Tournament seedings in parentheses. S=South Region. All times are in Eastern Time Source:.
