= Derrik Smits =

American basketball player

Free agent
- Position: Center

Personal information
- Born: September 6, 1996 (age 30) Zionsville, Indiana, U.S.
- Listed height: 7 ft 1 in (2.16 m)
- Listed weight: 245 lb (111 kg)

Career information
- High school: Zionsville (Zionsville, Indiana)
- College: Valparaiso (2015–2019); Butler (2019–2020)
- NBA draft: 2020: undrafted
- Playing career: 2020–2020

Career history
- 2020: Real Valladolid

Derrik Adrianus Edward Smits (born September 6, 1996) is a former American-born basketball player of Dutch descent. Standing at 7 ft 1 in (2.16 m), he played the center position. He is the son of former basketball player Rik Smits.

== College career ==
Smits played for the Valparaiso University men's basketball team from 2016 to 2019. He was forced to redshirt the 2015–16 season due to an injury, and began playing the following season at Valparaiso. He averaged 7.5 points and 3.6 rebounds per game as a sophomore. As a junior, Smits averaged 12.2 points and 5.7 rebounds per game, earning Missouri Valley Conference All-Most Improved Team honors. He graduated from Valparaiso in December 2018, taking graduate-level courses in the 2019 spring term to maintain his basketball eligibility; his graduation made him immediately eligible to transfer. Smits played his final season of college eligibility in 2019–20 at Butler University, choosing the Bulldogs over North Carolina State and Arizona State. He averaged 3.1 points and 1.7 rebounds per game for the Bulldogs.

== Professional career ==
Smits signed his first professional contract with Real Valladolid in Spain for the 2020–21 season. On November 16, he asked for the termination of his contract for personal reasons.
