= 2016–17 Wright State Raiders men's basketball team =

American college basketball season

2016–17 Wright State Raiders men's basketball
- Conference: Horizon League
- Record: 20–12 (11–7 Horizon)
- Head coach: Scott Nagy (1st season)
- Assistant coaches: Brian Cooley; Sharif Chambliss; Clint Sargent
- Home arena: Nutter Center

2016–17 Horizon League men's basketball standings
	Conf.				Overall
Team	W		L	PCT	W		L	PCT
Oakland	14	–	4	.778	25	–	9	.735
Valparaiso	14	–	4	.778	24	–	9	.727
Green Bay	12	–	6	.667	18	–	14	.563
Northern Kentucky †	12	–	6	.667	24	–	11	.686
Wright State	11	–	7	.611	20	–	12	.625
UIC	7	–	11	.389	17	–	19	.472
Detroit	6	–	12	.333	8	–	23	.258
Cleveland State	5	–	13	.278	9	–	22	.290
Youngstown State	5	–	13	.278	13	–	21	.382
Milwaukee	4	–	14	.222	11	–	24	.314
† 2017 Horizon League Tournament winner

The 2016–17 Wright State Raiders men's basketball team represented Wright State University during the 2016–17 NCAA Division I men's basketball season. The Raiders, led by first-year head coach Scott Nagy, played their home games at the Nutter Center in Fairborn, Ohio as members of the Horizon League. They finished the season 20–12, 11–7 in Horizon League play to finish fifth place. In the Horizon League tournament, they lost to Northern Kentucky in the quarterfinals. Despite having 20 wins, they did not participate in a postseason tournament.

== Previous season ==
The Raiders finished the 2015–16 season 22–13, 13–5 in Horizon League play to finish in a tie for second place. They defeated UIC, Detroit, and Oakland to advance to the Championship game of the Horizon League tournament where they lost to Green Bay. Despite having 22 wins, they did not participate in a postseason tournament.

On March 19, 2016 head coach Billy Donlon was fired. He finished at Wright State with a six-year record of 109–94. On April 4, the school hired Scott Nagy as head coach.

== Departures ==
Name	Number	Pos.	Height	Weight	Year	Hometown	Notes
Daniel Collie	2	G	6'0"	170	Senior	Parkersville, WV	Graduated
Biggie Minnis	10	G	6'3"	200	Senior	Philadelphia, PA	Graduated
J. T. Yoho	11	F	6'6"	235	Senior	Solsberry, IN	Graduated
Michael Karena	14	C	6'10"	270	Senior	Christchurch, New Zealand	Graduated
Brandon Neel	15	G	6'3"	190	RS Junior	Cincinnati, OH	Graduate transferred to Midwestern State
Daniel Mortensen	20	F	6'9"	230	Freshman	Islev, Denmark	Transferred to Barry
Joe Thomasson	32	G	6'4"	165	Senior	Dayton, OH	Graduated
Roderick Davis	35	F	6'9"	230	Sophomore	Brandon, FL	Transferred to Indianapolis

=== Incoming transfers ===
Name	Number	Pos.	Height	Weight	Year	Hometown	Previous School
Mike LaTulip	5	G	6'1"	170	RS Senior	Arlington Heights, IL	Transferred from Illinois. Will eligible to play since LaTulip graduated from Illinois.

== Recruiting class of 2016 ==
College recruiting information
Name	Hometown	School	Height	Weight	Commit date
Everett Winchester #90 SG	Baltimore, MD	Gilman School	6 ft 6 in (1.98 m)	190 lb (86 kg)	Sep 12, 2015
Everett Winchester #90 SG	Recruit ratings: Scout: Rivals: (59)				
Ryan Custer; PF	Cincinnati, OH	Elder High School	6 ft 8 in (2.03 m)	220 lb (100 kg)	Aug 4, 2015
Ryan Custer; PF	Recruit ratings: Scout: Rivals: (NR)				
Loudon Love-Vollbrecht; PF	Geneva, IL	Geneva High School	6 ft 8 in (2.03 m)	285 lb (129 kg)	
Loudon Love-Vollbrecht; PF	Recruit ratings: Scout: Rivals: (NR)				
Overall recruit ranking:
Note: In many cases, Scout, Rivals, 247Sports, On3, and ESPN may conflict in their listings of height and weight.; In these cases, the average was taken. ESPN grades are on a 100-point scale.; Sources: "2016 Team Ranking". Rivals.

== Roster ==
2016–17 Wright State Raiders men's basketball team
Players
Coaches

Pos.	#	Name	Height	Weight	Year	Previous school	Hometown
F	0	Steven Davis	6 ft 8 in (2.03 m)	220 lb (100 kg)	RS Sr	Manual	Indianapolis, IN
G	1	Justin Mitchell	6 ft 4 in (1.93 m)	190 lb (86 kg)	Jr	Wayne	Fort Wayne, IN
G	2	Everett Winchester	6 ft 6 in (1.98 m)	195 lb (88 kg)	Fr	Gilman	Baltimore, MD
G	3	Mark Hughes	6 ft 4 in (1.93 m)	180 lb (82 kg)	So	Ursuline	Youngstown, OH
G	4	Alan Vest	6 ft 3 in (1.91 m)	185 lb (84 kg)	So	Chaminade-Julienne	Kettering, OH
G	5	Mike LaTulip	6 ft 1 in (1.85 m)	175 lb (79 kg)	RS Sr	Prospect; Illinois	Arlington Heights, IL
G	10	Adam Giles (W)	6 ft 3 in (1.91 m)	185 lb (84 kg)	So	Miamisburg	Miamisburg, OH
C	11	Loudon Love	6 ft 9 in (2.06 m)	300 lb (136 kg)	Fr	Geneva	Geneva, IL
G	12	Tye Wilburn	5 ft 11 in (1.8 m)	185 lb (84 kg)	Jr	Lake Central; Kilgore	Schereville, IN
G	13	Grant Benzinger	6 ft 3 in (1.91 m)	190 lb (86 kg)	Jr	Moeller	Cincinnati, OH
G	21	Trey Stacey	6 ft 4 in (1.93 m)	200 lb (91 kg)	Jr	Moeller	Cincinnati, OH
F/C	22	Parker Ernsthausen (W)	6 ft 11 in (2.11 m)	235 lb (107 kg)	RS So	Toledo St. John's	Bowling Green, OH
G	24	Mark Alstork	6 ft 5 in (1.96 m)	190 lb (86 kg)	RS Jr	Thurgood Marshall; Ball State	Dayton, OH
F	33	Ryan Custer	6 ft 7 in (2.01 m)	235 lb (107 kg)	Fr	Elder	Cincinnati, OH

Head coach

- Scott Nagy (Delta State)

Assistant coach(es)

- Brian Cooley (Nebraska Wesleyan)
- Sharif Chambliss (Wisconsin)
- Clint Sargent (South Dakota State)

Legend

- (C) Team captain
- (S) Suspended
- (I) Ineligible
- (W) Walk-on
- Injured
- Current redshirt

Roster

== Schedule and results ==
Date time, TV	Rank^{#}	Opponent^{#}	Result	Record	Site (attendance) city, state
Exhibition
11/02/2016*; 7:00 pm		Cedarville	W 88–62		Nutter Center (3,809); Fairborn, OH
Non-Conference regular season
11/11/2016*; 8:00 pm, ESPN3		at Southern Illinois	W 85–81	1–0	SIU Arena (4,427); Carbondale, IL
11/15/2016*; 7:00 pm		Miami (OH)	W 89–87	2–0	Nutter Center (3,813); Fairborn, OH
11/19/2016*; 7:00 pm, ESPN3		Toledo	L 78–82	2–1	Nutter Center; Fairborn, OH
11/21/2016*; 7:00 pm		Ohio Dominican; Men Against Breast Cancer Classic	W 109–54	3–1	Nutter Center (3,105); Fairborn, OH
11/25/2016*; 7:00 pm		Cal State Bakersfield; Men Against Breast Cancer Classic	W 68–64	4–1	Nutter Center (3,123); Fairborn, OH
11/26/2016*; 7:00 pm		North Dakota; Men Against Breast Cancer Classic	W 83–79	5–1	Nutter Center (3,024); Fairborn, OH
11/27/2016*; 4:30 pm		North Florida; Men Against Breast Cancer Classic	W 75–67	6–1	Nutter Center (2,975); Fairborn, OH
11/30/2016*; 7:00 pm, ESPN3		at Georgia State	L 74–81	6–2	GSU Sports Arena (1,256); Atlanta, GA
12/03/2016*; 5:00 pm		at Penn State	L 50–72	6–3	Bryce Jordan Center (6,227); University Park, PA
12/07/2016*; 6:00 pm, ESPN3		at Loyola–Chicago	L 64–77	6–4	Joseph J. Gentile Arena (1,428); Chicago, IL
12/13/2016*; 7:00 pm, ESPN3		Urbana	W 85–34	7–4	Nutter Center (3,295); Fairborn, OH
12/18/2016*; 4:00 pm, ESPN3		at Kent State	W 68–63	8–4	MAC Center (1,827); Kent, OH
12/22/2016*; 8:00 pm		at Murray State	W 77–62	9–4	CFSB Center (2,413); Murray, KY
Horizon League regular season
12/29/2016; 7:00 pm, ESPN3		at Oakland	L 62–81	9–5 (0–1)	Athletics Center O'rena (2,724); Rochester, MI
12/31/2016; 3:30 pm, ESPN3		at Detroit	W 85–72	10–5 (1–1)	Calihan Hall (1,360); Detroit, MI
01/05/2017; 7:30 pm, ESPN3		Cleveland State	W 55–51	11–5 (2–1)	Nutter Center (3,488); Fairborn, OH
01/07/2017; 4:00 pm, ASN/ESPN3		Youngstown State	L 75–80	11–6 (2–2)	Nutter Center (3,977); Fairborn, OH
01/12/2017; 8:00 pm, ESPN3		at Green Bay	L 61–78	11–7 (2–3)	Resch Center (2,416); Green Bay, WI
01/14/2017; 3:00 pm, ESPN3		at Milwaukee	W 70–67	12–7 (3–3)	UW–Milwaukee Panther Arena (1,402); Milwaukee, WI
01/20/2016; 7:00 pm, ESPN3		Detroit	W 106–88	13–7 (4–3)	Nutter Center (3,975); Fairborn, OH
01/22/2017; 2:00 pm, ESPN3		Oakland	W 88–67	14–7 (5–3)	Nutter Center (3,982); Fairborn, OH
01/27/2017; 8:00 pm, ESPN3		at Valparaiso	L 55–70	14–8 (5–4)	Athletics–Recreation Center (3,461); Valparaiso, IN
01/29/2017; 4:00 pm, ESPN3		at UIC	W 88–86	15–8 (6–4)	UIC Pavilion (2,508); Chicago, IL
02/04/2017; 7:00 pm		Northern Kentucky	L 79–83	15–9 (6–5)	Nutter Center (5,993); Fairborn, OH
02/09/2017; 7:00 pm, ASN		Milwaukee	W 76–65	16–9 (7–5)	Nutter Center (4,004); Fairborn, OH
02/11/2017; 7:00 pm, ESPN3		Green Bay	W 88–79	17–9 (8–5)	Nutter Center (6,678); Fairborn, OH
02/16/2017; 7:45 pm, ESPN3		at Youngstown State	W 84–81	18–9 (9–5)	Beeghly Center (2,351); Youngstown, OH
02/18/2017; 3:30 pm, ESPN3		at Cleveland State	W 74–68 ^{2OT}	19–9 (10–5)	Wolstein Center (1,297); Cleveland, OH
02/21/2017; 7:00 pm, ESPN3		at Northern Kentucky	L 76–83	19–10 (10–6)	BB&T Arena (2,908); Highland Heights, KY
02/24/2017; 7:30 pm, ESPN3		Valparaiso	L 74–84	19–11 (10–7)	Nutter Center (5,028); Fairborn, OH
02/26/2017; 2:00 pm, ESPN3		UIC	W 87–49	20–11 (11–7)	Nutter Center; Fairborn, OH
Horizon League tournament
03/05/2017; 7:30 pm, ESPN3	(5)	vs. (4) Northern Kentucky; Quarterfinals	L 77–82	20–12	Joe Louis Arena (5,654); Detroit, MI
*Non-conference game. ^{#}Rankings from AP Poll. (#) Tournament seedings in parentheses. All times are in Eastern Time.

== Awards and honors ==
Mark Alstork	First Team All Horizon League

== Statistics ==
Number	Name	Games	Average	Points	Assists	Rebounds
23	Mark Alstork	32	19.0	608	112	150
0	Steven Davis	32	14.9	477	32	139
13	Grant Benzinger	32	12.8	411	51	185
1	Justin Mitchell	32	11.5	367	127	267
5	Mike LaTulip	32	7.0	223	48	94
22	Parker Ernsthausen	31	5.2	162	26	65
3	Mark Hughes	26	3.2	83	38	68
33	Ryan Custer	32	2.2	70	13	23
12	Tye Wilburn	18	1.3	24	14	19
4	Alan Vest	20	0.8	16	10	15
21	Trey Stacey	9	1.8	16	1	2
10	Adam Giles	7	1.1	8	0	0
