= 2016–17 Cleveland State Vikings men's basketball team =

American college basketball season

2016–17 Cleveland State Vikings men's basketball
- Conference: Horizon League
- Record: 9–22 (5–13 Horizon)
- Head coach: Gary Waters (11th season)
- Assistant coaches: Larry DeSimpelare; Jermaine Henderson; Cornelius Jackson
- Home arena: Wolstein Center; Quicken Loans Arena

2016–17 Horizon League men's basketball standings
	Conf.				Overall
Team	W		L	PCT	W		L	PCT
Oakland	14	–	4	.778	25	–	9	.735
Valparaiso	14	–	4	.778	24	–	9	.727
Green Bay	12	–	6	.667	18	–	14	.563
Northern Kentucky †	12	–	6	.667	24	–	11	.686
Wright State	11	–	7	.611	20	–	12	.625
UIC	7	–	11	.389	17	–	19	.472
Detroit	6	–	12	.333	8	–	23	.258
Cleveland State	5	–	13	.278	9	–	22	.290
Youngstown State	5	–	13	.278	13	–	21	.382
Milwaukee	4	–	14	.222	11	–	24	.314
† 2017 Horizon League Tournament winner

The 2016–17 Cleveland State Vikings men's basketball team represented Cleveland State University in the 2016–17 NCAA Division I men's basketball season. They were coached by Gary Waters who was in his eleventh season. The Vikings played their home games at the Wolstein Center with two games at Quicken Loans Arena and were members of the Horizon League. It was the 86th season of Cleveland State basketball. They finished the season 9–22, 5–13 in Horizon League play to finish in a tie for eighth place. In the Horizon League tournament, they lost to Youngstown State in the first round.

On March 7, 2017, head coach Gary Waters retired. He finished at Cleveland State with an 11-year record of 194–172. On March 24, the school hired former Georgia and Western Kentucky head coach Dennis Felton.

== Previous season ==
The Vikings finished the 2015–16 season 9–23, 4–14 in Horizon League play to finish in ninth place. They lost in the first round of the Horizon League tournament to Green Bay.

== Offseason ==
=== Departures ===
Name	Number	Pos.	Height	Weight	Year	Hometown	Notes
Andre Yates	1	G	6'3"	185	Junior	Dayton, OH	Playing professional overseas
Myles Hamilton	2	G	6'1"	190	RS Junior	Cleveland, OH	Walk-on; transferred
Jonathan Janssen	13	F	6'9"	215	Freshman	Mountain Creek, Australia	Transferred to Hawaii Pacific
Khyler Fields	23	G	6'2"	175	Senior	Massilon, OH	Graduated
Aaron Scales	32	C	6'9"	260	RS Junior	High Point, NC	Graduate transferred to North Carolina A&T
Jeron Rogers	34	F	6'7"	220	Freshman	North Farmington, MI	Transferred to Oakland CC
Vinny Zollo	41	F	6'8"	230	Senior	Greenfield, OH	Graduated

=== Incoming transfers ===
Name	Number	Pos.	Height	Weight	Year	Hometown	Previous School
Gavin Peppers	2	G	6'1"	180	Junior	Washington, D.C.	Junior college transferred from Laramie County CC
Ravonn Posey	35	F	6'8"	280	Senior	Milwaukee, WI	Transferred from Cal State Bakersfield. Under NCAA transfer rules, Posey will have to sit out for the 2016–17 season. Will have one year of remaining eligibility.

=== 2016 recruiting class ===
College recruiting information
Name	Hometown	School	Height	Weight	Commit date
Evan Clayborne; PF	Dayton, OH	Thurgood Marshall High School	6 ft 7 in (2.01 m)	220 lb (100 kg)	Oct 26, 2015
Evan Clayborne; PF	Recruit ratings: Scout: Rivals: (NR)				
Andy Lucien; SF	North Olmsted, OH	North Olmsted High School	6 ft 7 in (2.01 m)	185 lb (84 kg)	Oct 20, 2015
Andy Lucien; SF	Recruit ratings: Scout: Rivals: (NR)				
Overall recruit ranking:
Note: In many cases, Scout, Rivals, 247Sports, On3, and ESPN may conflict in their listings of height and weight.; In these cases, the average was taken. ESPN grades are on a 100-point scale.; Sources: "2016 Team Ranking". Rivals.

=== 2017 recruiting class ===
College recruiting information (2017)
Name	Hometown	School	Height	Weight	Commit date
Shawn Christian; PG	Garfield Heights, OH	Garfield Heights High School	5 ft 11 in (1.80 m)	164 lb (74 kg)	
Shawn Christian; PG	Recruit ratings: Scout: Rivals: (NR)				
Overall recruit ranking:
Note: In many cases, Scout, Rivals, 247Sports, On3, and ESPN may conflict in their listings of height and weight.; In these cases, the average was taken. ESPN grades are on a 100-point scale.; Sources: "2017 Team Ranking". Rivals.

== Preseason ==
In a poll of the League’s coaches, media, and sports information directors, Cleveland State was picked to finish eighth in conference play. Rob Edwards was selected to the Preseason All-Horizon League second team.

== Roster ==
2016–17 Cleveland State Vikings men's basketball team
Players
Coaches

Pos.	#	Name	Height	Weight	Year	Previous school	Hometown
F	0	Derek Sloan	6 ft 6 in (1.98 m)	225 lb (102 kg)	Jr	Saint Ignatius High School	Moreland Hills, Ohio
G	1	Kenny Carpenter	6 ft 5 in (1.96 m)	180 lb (82 kg)	Jr	Cass Technical High School	Detroit, Michigan
G	2	Gavin Peppers	6 ft 2 in (1.88 m)	190 lb (86 kg)	Jr	Laramie County Community College	Brookeville, Maryland
G	3	Rob Edwards	6 ft 4 in (1.93 m)	200 lb (91 kg)	So	Cass Technical High School	Detroit, Michigan
G/F	4	Anthony Wright	6 ft 7 in (2.01 m)	200 lb (91 kg)	Jr	Harcum College	Harrisburg, Pennsylvania
F	5	Jibri Blount	6 ft 7 in (2.01 m)	220 lb (100 kg)	So	St. Vincent–St. Mary High School	Pittsburgh, Pennsylvania
G	11	Terrell Hales	6 ft 4 in (1.93 m)	190 lb (86 kg)	Jr	Douglass Academy for Young Men	Detroit, Michigan
G	12	Kasheem Thomas	6 ft 0 in (1.83 m)	165 lb (75 kg)	Fr	Champlain College Saint-Lambert	Châteauguay, Quebec, Canada
G	13	Nelson Maxwell (W)	6 ft 0 in (1.83 m)	170 lb (77 kg)	So	Fishburne Military School	Orange Village, Ohio
G	20	Bobby Word	6 ft 4 in (1.93 m)	180 lb (82 kg)	RS Jr	Oral Roberts	Lancaster, Texas
G	21	Tim Hasbargen (W)	6 ft 4 in (1.93 m)	200 lb (91 kg)	Jr	Nymphenburger Schulen	Munich, Germany
F	22	Evan Clayborne	6 ft 8 in (2.03 m)	240 lb (109 kg)	Fr	Thurgood Marshall High School	Dayton, Ohio
F	23	Jamarcus Hairston	6 ft 8 in (2.03 m)	230 lb (104 kg)	Jr	Louisburg College	Danville, Georgia
F	33	Demonte Flannigan	6 ft 8 in (2.03 m)	240 lb (109 kg)	Sr	Villa Angela-St. Joseph High School	Richmond Heights, Ohio
C	35	PJ Posey (I) (redshirt)	6 ft 8 in (2.03 m)	275 lb (125 kg)	Sr	Cal State Bakersfield	Milwaukee, Wisconsin
F	41	Andy Lucien (W)	6 ft 7 in (2.01 m)	190 lb (86 kg)	Fr	North Olmsted High School	North Olmsted, Ohio
G	55	Daniel Levitt	6 ft 1 in (1.85 m)	170 lb (77 kg)	So	New Hampton School	Montreal, Quebec, Canada

Head coach

- Gary Waters (Ferris State)

Assistant coach(es)

- Larry DeSimpelare (Spring Arbor)
- Jermaine Henderson (Miami (OH))
- Cornelius Jackson (Marshall)

Legend

- (C) Team captain
- (S) Suspended
- (I) Ineligible
- (W) Walk-on
- Injured
- Current redshirt

Roster

== Schedule and results ==
Date time, TV	Rank^{#}	Opponent^{#}	Result	Record	Site (attendance) city, state
Exhibition
11/08/2016*; 7:00 pm		Tiffin	W 89–67		Wolstein Center; Cleveland, OH
Non-Conference regular season
11/12/2016*; 5:00 pm		vs. Kent State; Northeast Ohio Coaches vs. Cancer Classic	L 74–79 ^{OT}	0–1	Beeghly Center; Youngstown, OH
11/15/2016*; 7:00 pm, ESPN3		Canisius; Bluegrass Showcase	W 67–64	1–1	Wolstein Center (1,149); Cleveland, OH
11/18/2016*; 8:00 pm		at UT Martin; Bluegrass Showcase	L 74–85	1–2	Skyhawk Arena (1,520); Martin, TN
11/23/2016*; 1:00 pm, SECN		at No. 1 Kentucky; Bluegrass Showcase	L 70–101	1–3	Rupp Arena (22,441); Lexington, KY
11/27/2016*; 2:00 pm		at Duquesne; Bluegrass Showcase	L 71–78	1–4	Palumbo Center (887); Pittsburgh, PA
11/30/2016*; 7:00 pm		at Arkansas State	L 51–78	1–5	Convocation Center (1,631); Jonesboro, AR
12/03/2016*; 12:00 pm, ESPN3		vs. Bethune-Cookman	W 73–62	2–5	Quicken Loans Arena (1,227); Cleveland, OH
12/07/2016*; 12:00 pm, ESPN3		vs. Western Michigan	W 85–62	3–5	Quicken Loans Arena (1,313); Cleveland, OH
12/10/2016*; 12:00 pm, ESPN3		at No. 15 Purdue	L 53–77	3–6	Mackey Arena (14,283); West Lafayette, IN
12/17/2016*; 12:00 pm		at Ohio	L 53–71	3–7	Convocation Center (4,463); Athens, OH
12/19/2016*; 12:00 pm, ESPN3		Lake Erie	W 79–62	4–7	Wolstein Center; Cleveland, OH
12/22/2016*; 12:00 pm		at Belmont	L 61–88	4–8	Curb Event Center (2,024); Nashville, TN
Horizon League regular season
12/29/2016; 7:00 pm, ESPN3		Green Bay	L 75–76 ^{OT}	4–9 (0–1)	Wolstein Center (1,441); Cleveland, OH
12/31/2016; 3:30 pm, ESPN3		Milwaukee	W 62–53	5–9 (1–1)	Wolstein Center (1,013); Cleveland, OH
01/05/2017; 7:30 pm, ESPN3		at Wright State	L 51–55	5–10 (1–2)	Nutter Center (3,488); Dayton, OH
01/07/2017; 1:00 pm, ESPN3		at Northern Kentucky	L 75–83	5–11 (1–3)	BB&T Arena (2,723); Highland Heights, KY
01/12/2017; 7:45 pm, ESPN3		UIC	L 54–59	5–12 (1–4)	Wolstein Center (1,393); Cleveland, OH
01/14/2017; 3:30 pm, ESPN3		Valparaiso	L 67–78	5–13 (1–5)	Wolstein Center (1,831); Cleveland, OH
01/16/2017; 7:00 pm, ASN		at Oakland	W 76–65	6–13 (2–5)	Athletics Center O'rena (2,135); Rochester, MI
01/20/2017; 3:30 pm		at Milwaukee	L 62–63	6–14 (2–6)	UW–Milwaukee Panther Arena (1,194); Milwaukee, WI
01/23/2017; 7:00 pm, ASN		at Green Bay	L 73–83	6–15 (2–7)	Resch Center (2,349); Green Bay, WI
01/28/2017; 7:00 pm, ESPN3		at Youngstown State	L 64–67	6–16 (2–8)	Beeghly Center (4,821); Youngstown, OH
02/02/2017; 7:00 pm		Detroit	W 90–73	7–16 (3–8)	Wolstein Center (1,543); Cleveland, OH
02/04/2017; 7:00 pm, ESPN3		Oakland	L 51–53	7–17 (3–9)	Wolstein Center (1,763); Cleveland, OH
02/09/2017; 8:00 pm, ESPN3		at Valparaiso	L 57–78	7–18 (3–10)	Athletics–Recreation Center (2,455); Valparaiso, IN
02/11/2017; 4:00 pm		at UIC	W 66–63	8–18 (4–10)	UIC Pavilion (4,711); Chicago, IL
02/16/2017; 7:45 pm, ESPN3		Northern Kentucky	L 60–62	8–19 (4–11)	Wolstein Center (1,247); Cleveland, OH
02/18/2017; 3:30 pm, ESPN3		Wright State	L 68–74 ^{2OT}	8–20 (4–12)	Wolstein Center (1,297); Cleveland, OH
02/21/2017; 7:00 pm, ESPN3		at Detroit	L 83–91	8–21 (4–13)	Calihan Hall (1,550); Detroit, MI
02/25/2017; 3:30 pm, ESPN3		Youngstown State	W 69–55	9–21 (5–13)	Wolstein Center (1,717); Cleveland, OH
Horizon League tournament
03/03/2017; 8:00 pm, ESPN3	(8)	vs. (9) Youngstown State; First Round	L 69–84	9–22	Joe Louis Arena (5,468); Detroit, MI
*Non-conference game. ^{#}Rankings from ESPN/USA Today Coaches Poll. (#) Tournament seedings in parentheses. All times are in Eastern Time.
