= 2016–17 Detroit Titans men's basketball team =

American college basketball season

2016–17 Detroit Titans men's basketball
- Conference: Horizon League
- Record: 8–23 (6–12 Horizon)
- Head coach: Bacari Alexander (1st season)
- Assistant coaches: Jermaine Jackson; Canaan Chatman; Pete Kahler
- Home arena: Calihan Hall

2016–17 Horizon League men's basketball standings
	Conf.				Overall
Team	W		L	PCT	W		L	PCT
Oakland	14	–	4	.778	25	–	9	.735
Valparaiso	14	–	4	.778	24	–	9	.727
Green Bay	12	–	6	.667	18	–	14	.563
Northern Kentucky †	12	–	6	.667	24	–	11	.686
Wright State	11	–	7	.611	20	–	12	.625
UIC	7	–	11	.389	17	–	19	.472
Detroit	6	–	12	.333	8	–	23	.258
Cleveland State	5	–	13	.278	9	–	22	.290
Youngstown State	5	–	13	.278	13	–	21	.382
Milwaukee	4	–	14	.222	11	–	24	.314
† 2017 Horizon League Tournament winner

The 2016–17 Detroit Titans men's basketball team, also known as Detroit Mercy, represented the University of Detroit Mercy during the 2016–17 NCAA Division I men's basketball season. The Titans, led by first-year head coach Bacari Alexander, played their home games at Calihan Hall as members of the Horizon League. They finished the season 8–23, 6–12 in Horizon League play to finish in seventh place. As the No. 7 seed in the Horizon League tournament, they lost to Milwaukee in the first round.

== Previous season ==
The Titans finished the 2015–16 season 16–15, 9–9 in Horizon League play to finish in sixth place. They defeated Youngstown State in the First Round of the Horizon League tournament to advance to the Second Round where they lost to Wright State.

On April 1, 2016, head coach Ray McCallum was fired. He finished at Detroit with an eight-year record of 130–132. On April 22, Bacari Alexander was hired as head coach.

== Departures ==
Name	Number	Pos.	Height	Weight	Year	Hometown	Notes
Anton Wilson	1	G	6'5"	210	Senior	Flint, MI	Graduated
Jalen Gibson	2	F	6'7"	213	Freshman	Detroit, MI	Transferred
Carlton Brundidge	4	G	6'2"	204	RS Senior	Southfield, MI	Graduated
Paris Bass	35	F/G	6'8"	200	RS Sophomore	Birmingham, MI	Playing professional overseas/in the D-League

=== Incoming transfers ===
Name	Number	Pos.	Height	Weight	Year	Hometown	Previous School
DeShawndre Black	4	G	6'2"	175	Junior	Westland, MI	Junior college transferred from Schoolcraft College.
Kameron Chatman	10	G/F	6'8"	215	Junior	Portland, OR	Transferred from Michigan. Under NCAA transfer rules, Chatman will have to sit out for the 2016–17 season. Will have two years of remaining eligibility.
Isaiah Jones	32	C	6'11"	240	Junior	Sacramento, CA	Junior college transferred from Mt. San Jacinto College

== Recruiting class of 2016 ==
College recruiting information
Name	Hometown	School	Height	Weight	Commit date
Corey Allen; PG	Ypslinati, MI	Ypslianti High School	6 ft 2 in (1.88 m)	180 lb (82 kg)	Oct 13, 2015
Corey Allen; PG	Recruit ratings: Scout: Rivals: (NR)				
Overall recruit ranking:
Note: In many cases, Scout, Rivals, 247Sports, On3, and ESPN may conflict in their listings of height and weight.; In these cases, the average was taken. ESPN grades are on a 100-point scale.; Sources: "2016 Team Ranking". Rivals.

== Roster ==
2016–17 Detroit Titans men's basketball team
Players
Coaches

Pos.	#	Name	Height	Weight	Year	Previous school	Hometown
G/F	0	Chris Jenkins	6 ft 8 in (2.03 m)	200 lb (91 kg)	RS Sr	Colorado	Detroit, Michigan
G	1	Corey Allen	6 ft 3 in (1.91 m)	214 lb (97 kg)	Fr	Ypsilanti High School	Ypsilanti, Michigan
G	2	Patrick Robinson Jr.	5 ft 11 in (1.8 m)	170 lb (77 kg)	Sr	Dakota College	Brampton, Ontario
G	4	DeShawndre Black	6 ft 2 in (1.88 m)	189 lb (86 kg)	Jr	Schoolcraft College	Westland, Michigan
PG	5	Matthew Grant	6 ft 0 in (1.83 m)	177 lb (80 kg)	Sr	Westchester Enriched Sciences Magnets	Los Angeles, California
G/F	10	Kameron Chatman (I) (redshirt)	6 ft 9 in (2.06 m)	225 lb (102 kg)	Jr	Michigan	Portland, Oregon
PG	11	Jarod Williams	6 ft 3 in (1.91 m)	220 lb (100 kg)	Sr	George Washington High School	Danville, Virginia
F/C	12	Malik Eichler	7 ft 0 in (2.13 m)	233 lb (106 kg)	Fr	MacDuffie School	Berlin, Germany
F	13	Cole Long	6 ft 8 in (2.03 m)	206 lb (93 kg)	Fr	Athlete Institute Basketball Academy	St. John's, Newfoundland
F	15	Aaron Foster-Smith	6 ft 7 in (2.01 m)	236 lb (107 kg)	So	Harry S. Truman High School	Taylor, Michigan
G	20	Jacob Joubert (W)	6 ft 2 in (1.88 m)	190 lb (86 kg)	Fr	North Farmington High School	Farmington Hills, Michigan
F	21	Jaleel Hogan	6 ft 7 in (2.01 m)	260 lb (118 kg)	Jr	Mount Pleasant High School	Saginaw, Michigan
G	23	Josh McFolley	6 ft 1 in (1.85 m)	172 lb (78 kg)	So	Western International High School	Detroit, Michigan
F	25	Gerald Blackshear Jr.	6 ft 8 in (2.03 m)	226 lb (103 kg)	So	Western International High School	Detroit, Michigan
F/C	32	Isaiah Jones	6 ft 11 in (2.11 m)	235 lb (107 kg)	Jr	Mt. San Jacinto College	Antelope, California
G	55	Ed Carter III (W)	6 ft 1 in (1.85 m)	174 lb (79 kg)	Fr	Edison Public School Academy	Detroit, Michigan

Head coach

- Bacari Alexander (Detroit Mercy)

Assistant coach(es)

- Jermaine Jackson (Detroit Mercy)
- Canaan Chatman (Portland)
- Pete Kahler (Xavier)

Legend

- (C) Team captain
- (S) Suspended
- (I) Ineligible
- (W) Walk-on
- Injured
- Current redshirt

Roster

== Schedule and results ==
Date time, TV	Rank^{#}	Opponent^{#}	Result	Record	High points	High rebounds	High assists	Site (attendance) city, state
Exhibition
Oct 29*; 7:00 pm		Wayne State	L 79–85		23 – Jenkins	13 – Jenkins	2 – 3 Tied	Calihan Hall (2,555); Detroit, MI
Nov 7*; 7:00 pm		Ferris State	L 79–85		19 – Allen	10 – Blackshear	3 – Williams	Calihan Hall (1,409); Detroit, MI
Non-conference regular season
Nov 11*; 7:00 pm, ESPN3		Adrian	W 99–69	1–0	16 – Allen	10 – Williams	5 – Carter III	Calihan Hall (1,009); Detroit, MI
Nov 14*; 7:00 pm		at East Tennessee State	L 78–107	1–1	25 – McFolley	5 – Jenkins	5 – Jenkins	Freedom Hall Civic Center (3,026); Johnson City, TN
Nov 18*; 3:00 pm, ESPN3		at Illinois; NIT Season Tip-Off	L 69–89	1–2	16 – McFolley, Hogan	9 – Jenkins	3 – Jenkins	State Farm Center (10,396); Champaign, IL
Nov 20*; 5:00 pm, ACCN Extra		at Florida State; NIT Season Tip-Off	L 71–100	1–3	18 – Jenkins	4 – Jenkins	4 – McFolley	Donald L. Tucker Civic Center (4,962); Tallahassee, FL
Nov 23*; 2:00 pm, America East TV		at New Hampshire; NIT Season Tip-Off	L 70–86	1–4	18 – Hogan	7 – Blackshear	4 – McFolley	Lundholm Gym (477); Durham, NH
Nov 26*; 2:00 pm, ESPN3/WADL-38		Manhattan; NIT Season Tip-Off	L 81–84 ^{2OT}	1–5	19 – Hogan	9 – Hogan	7 – Black	Calihan Hall (1,012); Detroit, MI
Nov 30*; 7:00 pm, ESPN3/WADL		Eastern Michigan	L 61–87	1–6	20 – Allen	9 – Hogan	3 – Black	Calihan Hall (1,250); Detroit, MI
Dec 3*; 8:00 pm		at Murray State	L 76–86	1–7	17 – McFolley	7 – Hogan	5 – Black	CFSB Center (3,191); Murray, KY
Dec 7*; 7:00 pm, ESPN3		at Toledo	L 65–73	1–8	15 – Jenkins	14 – Jenkins	4 – McFolley	Savage Arena (4,028); Toledo, OH
Dec 10*; 12:00 pm, ESPN3		at Bowling Green	L 61–74	1–9	16 – Hogan	9 – Blackshear	3 – Jenkins, Black	Stroh Center (1,513); Bowling Green, OH
Dec 17*; 2:00 pm, ESPN3/WADL		WKU	W 85–79	2–9	24 – McFolley	8 – Hogan	8 – McFolley	Calihan Hall (1,027); Detroit, MI
Dec 22*; 7:00 pm, ESPN3/WADL		Fort Wayne	L 86–93	2–10	33 – Allen	16 – Jenkins	9 – McFolley	Calihan Hall (1,257); Detroit, MI
Horizon League regular season
Dec 29; 7:30 pm, ESPN3/WADL		Northern Kentucky	L 70–81	2–11 (0–1)	22 – Hogan	8 – Hogan	3 – McFolley, Williams	Calihan Hall (1,299); Detroit, MI
Dec 31; 3:30 pm, ESPN3/WADL		Wright State	L 72–85	2–12 (0–2)	23 – Allen	6 – Grant	2 – 3 tied	Calihan Hall (1,360); Detroit, MI
Jan 6; 8:00 pm, ESPN3		at UIC	L 64–78	2–13 (0–3)	17 – Hogan	8 – Jenkins	3 – Mcfolley	UIC Pavilion (1,832); Chicago, IL
Jan 8; 1:00 pm, ASN		at Valparaiso	L 74–81	2–14 (0–4)	18 – Jenkins	10 – Jenkins	5 – McFolley	Athletics–Recreation Center (1,776); Valparaiso, IN
Jan 13; 7:00 pm, ESPNU		at Oakland	W 93–88	3–14 (1–4)	39 – Hogan	11 – Hogan	8 – Black	Athletics Center O'rena (4,123); Rochester, MI
Jan 16; 7:00 pm, ESPN3/WADL		Youngstown State	W 87–71	4–14 (2–4)	26 – McFolley	6 – Jenkins, Long	4 – Hogan	Calihan Hall; Detroit, MI
Jan 20; 7:00 pm, ESPN3		at Wright State	L 88–106	4–15 (2–5)	25 – McFolley	13 – Jenkins	5 – McFolley	Nutter Center (3,975); Dayton, OH
Jan 22; 1:00 pm, ESPN3		at Northern Kentucky	L 87–101	4–16 (2–6)	20 – Jenkins	9 – Jenkins	5 – McFolley	BB&T Arena (2,083); Highland Heights, KY
Jan 27; 7:00 pm, ESPN3/WADL		Milwaukee	L 69–73	4–17 (2–7)	22 – Allen	11 – Hogan, Williams	3 – McFolley, Robinson	Calihan Hall (1,751); Detroit, MI
Jan 29; 2:00 pm, ESPN3/WADL		Green Bay	W 93–92	5–17 (3–7)	28 – Hogan	5 – Black	5 – Black	Calihan Hall (1,505); Detroit, MI
Feb 2; 7:00 pm, ESPN3		at Cleveland State	L 73–90	5–18 (3–8)	24 – Allen	11 – Blackshear	3 – McFolley	Wolstein Center (1,543); Cleveland, OH
Feb 4; 7:00 pm, ESPN3		at Youngstown State	W 90–80	6–18 (4–8)	27 – Allen	12 – Hogan	4 – Hogan	Beeghly Center (3,465); Youngstown, OH
Feb 10; 7:00 pm, ESPN3/WADL		Oakland	L 80–89	6–19 (4–9)	23 – Hogan	9 – Hogan	3 – Hogan	Calihan Hall (6,275); Detroit, MI
Feb 17; 7:00 pm, ESPN3/WADL		UIC	L 69–74	6–20 (4–10)	21 – Allen	10 – Hogan	2 – Tied	Calihan Hall (1,203); Detroit, MI
Feb 19; 2:00 pm, ESPN3		Valparaiso	W 83–63	6–21 (4–11)	14 – Robinson Jr.	7 – Hogan	3 – McFolley	Calihan Hall (2,003); Detroit, MI
Feb 21; 7:00 pm, ESPN3/WADL		Cleveland State	W 91–83	7–21 (5–11)	25 – Jenkins	12 – Hogan	9 – Williams	Calihan Hall (1,550); Detroit, MI
Feb 24; 8:00 pm, ESPN3		at Milwaukee	W 81–74	8–21 (6–11)	22 – McFolley	13 – Jenkins	6 – McFolley	Klotsche Center (1,273); Milwaukee, WI
Feb 26; 3:00 pm, ASN/ESPN3		at Green Bay	L 81–89	8–22 (6–12)	24 – Allen	7 – Williams	6 – Williams	Resch Center (3,718); Green Bay, WI
Horizon League tournament
Mar 3; 5:30 pm, ESPN3	(7)	vs. (10) Milwaukee; First Round	L 60–85	8–23	18 – Allen	6 – Tied	4 – Tied	Joe Louis Arena (5,468); Detroit, MI
*Non-conference game. ^{#}Rankings from AP Poll. (#) Tournament seedings in parentheses. All times are in Eastern Time.
