= 2016–17 Youngstown State Penguins men's basketball team =

American college basketball season

2016–17 Youngstown State Penguins men's basketball
- Conference: Horizon League
- Record: 13–21 (5–13 Horizon)
- Head coach: Jerry Slocum (12th season)
- Assistant coaches: Michael Wernicki; Stew Robinson; Kevin Bruinsma
- Home arena: Beeghly Center

2016–17 Horizon League men's basketball standings
	Conf.				Overall
Team	W		L	PCT	W		L	PCT
Oakland	14	–	4	.778	25	–	9	.735
Valparaiso	14	–	4	.778	24	–	9	.727
Green Bay	12	–	6	.667	18	–	14	.563
Northern Kentucky †	12	–	6	.667	24	–	11	.686
Wright State	11	–	7	.611	20	–	12	.625
UIC	7	–	11	.389	17	–	19	.472
Detroit	6	–	12	.333	8	–	23	.258
Cleveland State	5	–	13	.278	9	–	22	.290
Youngstown State	5	–	13	.278	13	–	21	.382
Milwaukee	4	–	14	.222	11	–	24	.314
† 2017 Horizon League Tournament winner

The 2016–17 Youngstown State Penguins men's basketball team represented Youngstown State University during the 2016–17 NCAA Division I men's basketball season. The Penguins, led by 12th-year head coach Jerry Slocum, played their home games at the Beeghly Center as members of the Horizon League. They finished the regular season 13–21, 5–13 in Horizon League play to finish in a tie for eighth place. As the No. 9 seed in the Horizon League tournament, they defeated Cleveland State and Oakland before losing to Northern Kentucky in the semifinals.

On March 7, 2017, Jerry Slocum announced he was retiring as head coach at Youngstown State. He had a record of 142–232 in 12 years at the school. On March 27, the school hired Jerrod Calhoun from Division II Fairmont State as the new head coach.

== Previous season ==
The Penguins finished the 2015–16 season 11–21, 6–12 in Horizon League play to finish in seventh place. They lost to Detroit in the first round of the Horizon League tournament.

== Departures ==
Name	Number	Pos.	Height	Weight	Year	Hometown	Notes
Bobby Hain	20	F	6'10"	240	Senior	Jupiter, FL	Graduated
Jordan Andrews	25	F	6'5"	180	Freshman	LaPlace, LA	Transferred to South Alabama
Bryce Nickels	33	F	6'9"	200	Freshman	Tampa, FL	Transferred to Florida SouthWestern State

=== Incoming transfers ===
Name	Number	Pos.	Height	Weight	Year	Hometown	Previous School
Rahim Williams	22	G	6'5"	185	Junior	Brampton, ON	Junior college transferred from State College of Florida

== Recruiting class of 2016 ==
College recruiting information
Name	Hometown	School	Height	Weight	Commit date
Braun Hartfield; SG	Garfield Heights, OH	Garfield Heights High School	6 ft 4 in (1.93 m)	N/A	Oct 20, 2015
Braun Hartfield; SG	Recruit ratings: Scout: Rivals: (NR)				
Overall recruit ranking:
Note: In many cases, Scout, Rivals, 247Sports, On3, and ESPN may conflict in their listings of height and weight.; In these cases, the average was taken. ESPN grades are on a 100-point scale.; Sources: "2016 Team Ranking". Rivals.

== Roster ==
2016–17 Youngstown State Penguins men's basketball team
Players
Coaches

Pos.	#	Name	Height	Weight	Year	Previous school	Hometown
F	0	Matt Donlan	6 ft 7 in (2.01 m)	190 lb (86 kg)	RS Sr	Capital Christian; Iowa Western CC	Melbourne, Australia
G	1	Braun Hartfield	6 ft 4 in (1.93 m)	185 lb (84 kg)	Fr	Garfield Heights	Cleveland, OH
F	2	Devin Haygood	6 ft 7 in (2.01 m)	185 lb (84 kg)	So	Lincoln	Ypsilanti, MI
G	4	Jeremiah Ferguson	6 ft 2 in (1.88 m)	180 lb (82 kg)	Fr	Marist	Naperville, IL
G	10	Ryan Strollo	6 ft 2 in (1.88 m)	190 lb (86 kg)	RS Jr	Ursuline	Youngstown, OH
G	11	Latin Davis	5 ft 11 in (1.8 m)	165 lb (75 kg)	So	Milan	Ypsilanti, MI
G	12	Noah Dean (W)	6 ft 4 in (1.93 m)	175 lb (79 kg)	Fr	Southside Christian	Greenville, SC
G	14	Tyler Warford (W)	6 ft 1 in (1.85 m)	170 lb (77 kg)	Sr	Muhlenberg County (KY); Howard CC	Pittsburgh, PA
G	15	Brett Frantz	6 ft 3 in (1.91 m)	185 lb (84 kg)	RS Sr	Free State; Neosho County CC	Lawrence, KS
F	21	Stefan Rosic	6 ft 7 in (2.01 m)	200 lb (91 kg)	Jr	North Central Texas Academy; Arizona Western College	Kragujevac, Serbia
G/F	22	Rahim Williams	6 ft 6 in (1.98 m)	190 lb (86 kg)	Jr	Orangeville Prep; State College of Florida	Toronto, ON
G	23	Francisco Santiago	6 ft 1 in (1.85 m)	160 lb (73 kg)	RS Jr	Saint Ignatius; Wheeling Jesuit	Cleveland, OH
G	24	Cameron Morse	6 ft 3 in (1.91 m)	185 lb (84 kg)	Jr	Carman-Ainsworth	Flint, MI
C	32	Jordan Kaufman	7 ft 0 in (2.13 m)	250 lb (113 kg)	RS Sr	Central; Oral Roberts	Andover, KS

Head coach

- Jerry Slocum (Kings (N.Y.))

Assistant coach(es)

- Michael Wernicki (Pittsburgh)
- Stew Robinson (Indiana)
- Kevin Bruinsman (Spring Harbor)

Legend

- (C) Team captain
- (S) Suspended
- (I) Ineligible
- (W) Walk-on
- Injured
- Current redshirt

Roster

== Schedule and results ==
Date time, TV	Rank^{#}	Opponent^{#}	Result	Record	Site (attendance) city, state
Exhibition
11/05/2016*; 1:30 pm		Penn State Behrend	W 100–61		Beeghly Center; Youngstown, OH
Non-Conference regular season
11/12/2016*; 7:45 pm, ESPN3		Akron; Northeast Ohio Coaches vs. Cancer	W 90–82	1–0	Beeghly Center (2,601); Youngstown, OH
11/15/2016*; 8:00 pm		at Toledo	L 98–103 ^{OT}	1–1	Savage Arena (3,891); Toledo, OH
11/18/2016*; 5:30 pm		vs. Jacksonville; Red Diamond Roundball Classic	L 54–79	1–2	Mitchell Center (2,225); Mobile, AL
11/19/2016*; 3:05 pm		at South Alabama; Red Diamond Roundball Classic	L 75–84	1–3	Mitchell Center (1,948); Mobile, AL
11/20/2016*; 1:30 pm		vs. FIU; Red Diamond Roundball Classic	W 78–73	2–3	Mitchell Center (1,823); Mobile, AL
11/22/2016*; 7:00 pm, ESPN3		Westminster (PA); Red Diamond Roundball Classic	W 97–67	3–3	Beeghly Center (1,654); Youngstown, OH
11/26/2016*; 12:00 pm, ESPN3		Canisius	L 84–90	3–4	Beeghly Center (1,174); Youngstown, OH
11/30/2016*; 7:00 pm		at Robert Morris	W 75–74	4–4	Charles L. Sewall Center (792); Moon Township, PA
12/03/2016*; 8:00 pm, ESPN3		Oberlin	W 87–72	5–4	Beeghly Center (1,773); Youngstown, OH
12/06/2016*; 7:00 pm, ESPNU		at Michigan State	L 57–77	5–5	Breslin Center (14,797); East Lansing, MI
12/10/2016*; 2:00 pm		at American	L 62–77	5–6	Bender Arena (1,143); Washington, D.C.
12/14/2016*; 7:00 pm, ESPN3		Niagara	W 101–97 ^{OT}	6–6	Beeghly Center (1,294); Youngstown, OH
12/20/2016*; 7:00 pm, ESPN3		at Ohio State	L 40–77	6–7	Value City Arena (11,417); Columbus, OH
Horizon League regular season
12/29/2016; 7:00 pm, ESPN3		Milwaukee	W 88–87	7–7 (1–0)	Beeghly Center (2,854); Youngstown, OH
12/31/2016; 12:00 pm, ESPN3		Green Bay	L 77–90	7–8 (1–1)	Beeghly Center (1,402); Youngstown, OH
01/05/2017; 7:30 pm, ESPN3		at Northern Kentucky	L 70–83	7–9 (1–2)	BB&T Arena (2,632); Highland Heights, KY
01/07/2017; 4:00 pm, ASN		at Wright State	W 80–75	8–9 (2–2)	Nutter Center (3,977); Dayton, OH
01/12/2017; 7:45 pm, ESPN3		Valparaiso	L 62–78	8–10 (2–3)	Beeghly Center (2,517); Youngstown, OH
01/14/2017; 7:00 pm, ESPN3		UIC	L 89–92 ^{OT}	8–11 (2–4)	Beeghly Center (2,787); Youngstown, OH
01/16/2017; 7:00 pm, ESPN3		at Detroit	L 71–87	8–12 (2–5)	Calihan Hall; Detroit, MI
01/20/2017; 8:00 pm, ESPN3		at Green Bay	W 92–89	9–12 (3–5)	Resch Center (2,991); Green Bay, WI
01/22/2017; 2:00 pm, ESPN3		at Milwaukee	L 85–94 ^{OT}	9–13 (3–6)	UW–Milwaukee Panther Arena (641); Milwaukee, WI
01/28/2017; 7:00 pm, ESPN3		Cleveland State	W 67–64	10–13 (4–6)	Beeghly Center (4,821); Youngstown, OH
02/02/2017; 7:00 pm, ESPN3		Oakland	L 76–90	10–14 (4–7)	Beeghly Center (1,550); Youngstown, OH
02/04/2017; 7:00 pm, ESPN3		Detroit	L 80–90	10–15 (4–8)	Beeghly Center (3,465); Youngstown, OH
02/09/2017; 8:00 pm, ESPN3		at UIC	L 81–84	10–16 (4–9)	UIC Pavilion (5,519); Chicago, IL
02/11/2017; 8:00 pm, ESPN3		at Valparaiso	L 72–82	10–17 (4–10)	Athletics–Recreation Center (4,823); Valparaiso, IN
02/16/2017; 7:45 pm, ESPN3		Wright State	L 81–84	10–18 (4–11)	Beeghly Center (2,351); Youngstown, OH
02/18/2017; 7:00 pm, ESPN3		Northern Kentucky	W 81–77	11–18 (5–11)	Beeghly Center (4,609); Youngstown, OH
02/21/2017; 7:00 pm, ESPN3		at Oakland	L 72–101	11–19 (5–12)	Athletics Center O'rena (2,553); Rochester, MI
02/25/2017; 3:30 pm, ESPN3		at Cleveland State	L 55–69	11–20 (5–13)	Wolstein Center (1,717); Cleveland, OH
Horizon League tournament
03/03/2017; 8:00 pm, ESPN3	(9)	vs. (8) Cleveland State; First Round	W 84–69	12–20	Joe Louis Arena (5,468); Detroit, MI
03/04/2017; 5:30 pm, ESPN3	(9)	vs. (1) Oakland; Quarterfinals	W 81–80	13–20	Joe Louis Arena (8,481); Detroit, MI
03/06/2017; 7:00 pm, ESPNU	(9)	vs. (4) Northern Kentucky; Semifinals	L 74–84	13–21	Joe Louis Arena (3,708); Detroit, MI
*Non-conference game. ^{#}Rankings from AP Poll. (#) Tournament seedings in parentheses. All times are in Eastern Time Source.
