= 2017 Horizon League men's basketball tournament =

- Classification: Division I
- Season: 2016–17
- Teams: 10
- Site: Joe Louis Arena; Detroit, Michigan
- Champions: Northern Kentucky (1st title)
- Winning coach: John Brannen (1st title)
- MVP: Lavone Holland (Northern Kentucky)
- Attendance: 29,240
- Television: ESPN, ESPNU, ESPN3

2016–17 Horizon League men's basketball standings
	Conf.				Overall
Team	W		L	PCT	W		L	PCT
Oakland	14	–	4	.778	25	–	9	.735
Valparaiso	14	–	4	.778	24	–	9	.727
Green Bay	12	–	6	.667	18	–	14	.563
Northern Kentucky †	12	–	6	.667	24	–	11	.686
Wright State	11	–	7	.611	20	–	12	.625
UIC	7	–	11	.389	17	–	19	.472
Detroit	6	–	12	.333	8	–	23	.258
Cleveland State	5	–	13	.278	9	–	22	.290
Youngstown State	5	–	13	.278	13	–	21	.382
Milwaukee	4	–	14	.222	11	–	24	.314
† 2017 Horizon League Tournament winner

The 2017 Horizon League men's basketball tournament (also known as Motor City Madness) was the conference tournament for the Horizon League. It was played from March 3 through March 7, 2017 at Joe Louis Arena in Detroit. Northern Kentucky defeated Milwaukee 59-53 in the championship game to win the tournament championship. As a result, Northern Kentucky received the conference's automatic berth into the 2017 NCAA Division I men's basketball tournament, the first for the Norse in their first season of Division I eligibility.

== Seeds ==
All 10 teams participated in the tournament. The top six teams receive a bye into the quarterfinals. This was a change from the previous season where the top two seeds received double byes into the semifinals. Teams were seeded by record within the conference, with a tiebreaker system to seed teams with identical conference records.

Seed	School	Conference	Tiebreaker
1	Oakland	14–4	2–0 vs. Valparaiso
2	Valparaiso	14–4	0–2 vs. Oakland
3	Green Bay	12–6	1–1 vs. Northern Kentucky; 1–1 vs. No. 1 Oakland
4	Northern Kentucky	12–6	1–1 vs. Green Bay; 0–2 vs. No. 1 Oakland
5	Wright State	11–7	
6	UIC	7–11	
7	Detroit	6–12	
8	Cleveland State	5–13	1–1 vs. Youngstown State; 1–1 vs. No. 1 Oakland
9	Youngstown State	5–13	1–1 vs. Cleveland State; 0–2 vs. No. 1 Oakland
10	Milwaukee	4–14	

== Schedule ==
Game	Time	Matchup	Score	Television
First round – Friday, March 3
1	5:30 pm	No. 7 Detroit vs. No. 10 Milwaukee	85–60	ESPN3
2	8:00 pm	No. 8 Cleveland State vs. No. 9 Youngstown State	84–69	ESPN3
Quarterfinals – Saturday, March 4
3	5:30 pm	No. 1 Oakland vs. No. 9 Youngstown State	81–80	ESPN3
4	8:00 pm	No. 2 Valparaiso vs. No. 10 Milwaukee	43–41	ESPN3
Quarterfinals – Sunday, March 5
5	5:00 pm	No. 3 Green Bay vs. No. 6 UIC	79–70	ESPN3
6	7:30 pm	No. 4 Northern Kentucky vs. No. 5 Wright State	82–77	ESPN3
Semifinals – Monday, March 6
7	7:00 pm	No. 4 Northern Kentucky vs. No. 9 Youngstown State	84–74	ESPNU
8	9:30 pm	No. 6 UIC vs. No. 10 Milwaukee	74–68	ESPNU
Finals – Tuesday, March 7
9	7:00 pm	No. 4 Northern Kentucky vs. No. 10 Milwaukee	59–53	ESPN
All game times in Eastern Time Zone. Rankings denote tournament seed

== Bracket ==
First round Friday, March 3
8	Cleveland State	69
9	Youngstown State	84
7	Detroit	60
10	Milwaukee	85

Quarterfinals; Saturday/Sunday, March 4/5
1	Oakland	80
9	Youngstown State	81
4	Northern Kentucky	82
5	Wright State	77
2	Valparaiso	41
10	Milwaukee	43
3	Green Bay	70
6	UIC	79

Semifinals; Monday, March 6
9	Youngstown State	74
4	Northern Kentucky	84
10	Milwaukee	74
6	UIC	68

Finals; Tuesday, March 7
4	Northern Kentucky	59
10	Milwaukee	53
