= Matt Lottich =

American basketball player and coach (born 1982)

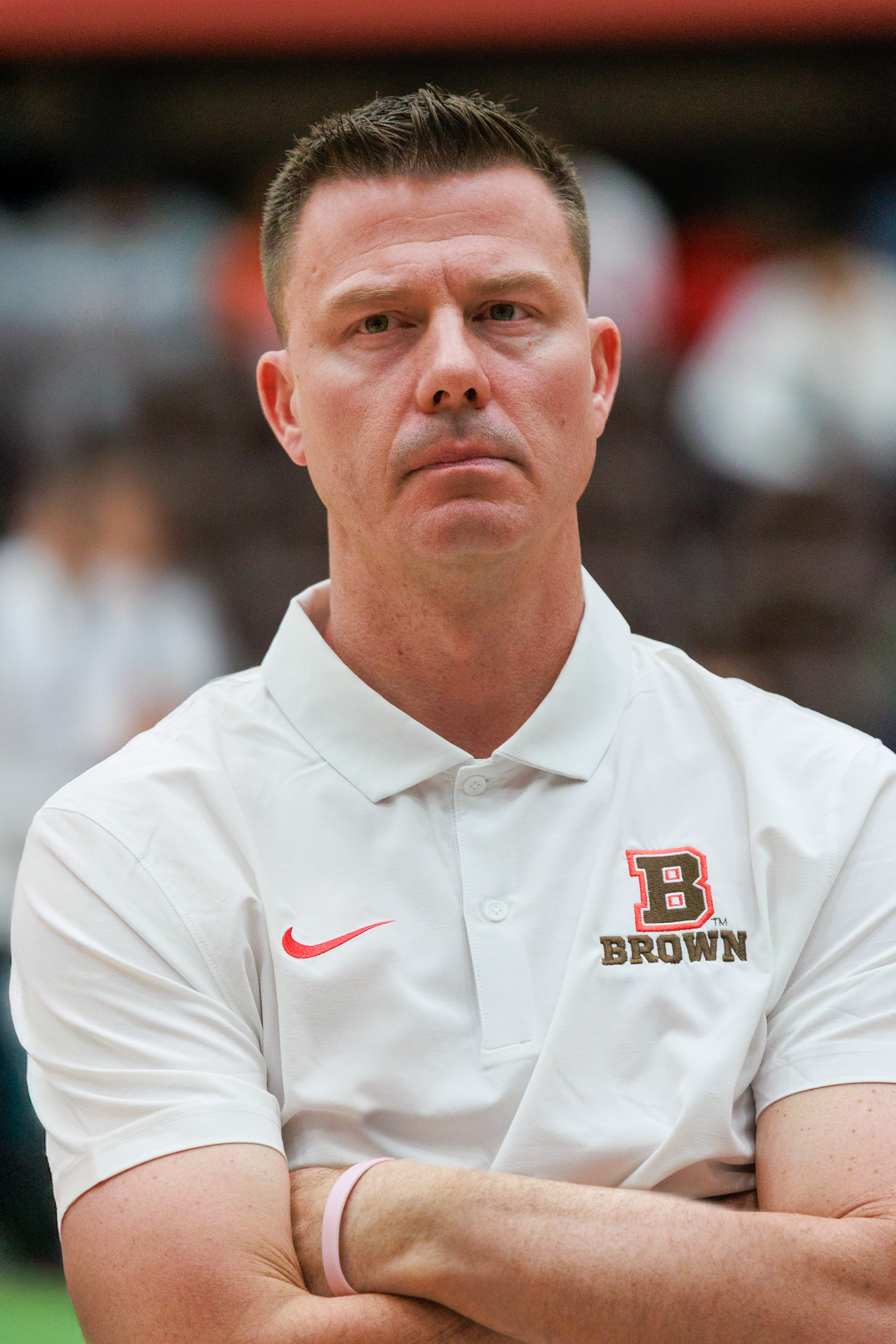
- Lottich at Brown in 2024

Grand Canyon Antelopes
- Title: Assistant Coach

Personal information
- Born: July 29, 1982 (age 44) Winnetka, Illinois, U.S.
- Listed height: 6 ft 4 in (1.93 m)
- Listed weight: 205 lb (93 kg)

Career information
- High school: New Trier (Winnetka, Illinois)
- College: Stanford (2000–2004)
- NBA draft: 2004: undrafted
- Playing career: 2000–2012
- Position: Guard
- Coaching career: 2013–present

Career history

Playing
- 2004: Harbour Heat
- 2005–2008: Osaka Evessa
- 2008–2009: Düsseldorf Giants
- 2009–2012: Oita HeatDevils

Coaching
- 2013–2016: Valparaiso (assistant)
- 2016–2023: Valparaiso
- 2023–2024: Missouri (spec. assistant to the HC)
- 2024–2025: Brown (AHC)
- 2025–present: Grand Canyon (assistant)

Career highlights
- Horizon League regular season championship (2017)

Matthew David Lottich (/ˈlɒtɪk/ LOT-ik; born July 29, 1982) is an American basketball coach who is currently an assistant coach for Grand Canyon University. He was previously the head coach at Valparaiso University.

== Early life ==
Lottich went to New Trier High School in Winnetka, Illinois, where he was an all-state athlete in basketball, baseball, and football. He played collegiately at Stanford University, where he earned Honorable Mention All-Pac-10 accolades as a senior.

== Professional career ==
After college, Lottich played professional basketball internationally. He played in New Zealand for the Harbour Heat of the NBL in 2004. He played two stints for the Japanese bj league with the Osaka Evessa from 2005 to 2008, and the Oita Heat Devils from 2009 to 2012. Lottich also played in the Bundesliga for the Düsseldorf Giants from 2008 to 2009.

== Coaching career ==
Lottich served as an assistant coach at Valparaiso University from 2013 to 2016. He was named head coach on April 7, 2016, one day after Bryce Drew left the program. He held this position until he was terminated as head coach on March 23, 2023.

After he was fired by Valparaiso, Lottich was hired as Associate Head Coach at Brown University in August 2024. After one season at Brown he was hired as assistant coach at Grand Canyon University.

== Head coach career record ==
Record table
Season	Team	Overall	Conference	Standing	Postseason
Valparaiso Crusaders (Horizon League) (2016–2017)
2016–17	Valparaiso	24–9	14–4	T–1st	NIT First Round
Valparaiso Crusaders / Beacons (Missouri Valley Conference) (2017–2023)
2017–18	Valparaiso	15–17	6–12	10th	
2018–19	Valparaiso	15–18	7–11	T–8th	
2019–20	Valparaiso	19–16	9–9	T–6th	
2020–21	Valparaiso	10–18	7–11	T–5th	
2021–22	Valparaiso	14–18	6–12	7th	
2022–23	Valparaiso	11–21	5–15	10th	
Valparaiso:		108–117 (.480)	54–74 (.422)		
Total:		108–117 (.480)			
National champion Postseason invitational champion Conference regular season champion Conference regular season and conference tournament champion Division regular season champion Division regular season and conference tournament champion Conference tournament champion
