= 2016–17 UIC Flames men's basketball team =

American college basketball season

2016–17 UIC Flames men's basketball

CBI, Semifinals
- Conference: Horizon League
- Record: 17–19 (7–11 Horizon)
- Head coach: Steve McClain (2nd season)
- Assistant coaches: Ron Coleman; Brendan Mullins; Seth Cooper
- Home arena: UIC Pavilion

2016–17 Horizon League men's basketball standings
| | Conf. | | | | Overall |
| Team | W | | L | PCT | W | | L | PCT |
|---|---|---|---|---|---|---|---|---|
| Oakland | 14 | – | 4 | .778 | 25 | – | 9 | .735 |
| Valparaiso | 14 | – | 4 | .778 | 24 | – | 9 | .727 |
| Green Bay | 12 | – | 6 | .667 | 18 | – | 14 | .563 |
| Northern Kentucky † | 12 | – | 6 | .667 | 24 | – | 11 | .686 |
| Wright State | 11 | – | 7 | .611 | 20 | – | 12 | .625 |
| UIC | 7 | – | 11 | .389 | 17 | – | 19 | .472 |
| Detroit | 6 | – | 12 | .333 | 8 | – | 23 | .258 |
| Cleveland State | 5 | – | 13 | .278 | 9 | – | 22 | .290 |
| Youngstown State | 5 | – | 13 | .278 | 13 | – | 21 | .382 |
| Milwaukee | 4 | – | 14 | .222 | 11 | – | 24 | .314 |
† 2017 Horizon League Tournament winner

The 2016–17 UIC Flames men's basketball team represented the University of Illinois at Chicago in the 2016–17 NCAA Division I men's basketball season. The Flames, led by second-year head coach Steve McClain, played their home games at the UIC Pavilion as members of the Horizon League. They finished the season 17–19, 7–11 in Horizon League play to finish in sixth place. They defeated Green Bay in the quarterfinals of the Horizon League tournament before losing to Milwaukee in the semifinals. They were invited to the College Basketball Invitational where they defeated Stony Brook and George Washington before losing in the semifinals to Coastal Carolina.

== Previous season ==
The Flames finished the 2015–16 season 5–25, 3–15 in Horizon League play to finish in last place. They lost in the first round of the Horizon League tournament to Wright State.

== Departures ==
| Name | Number | Pos. | Height | Weight | Year | Hometown | Notes |
|---|---|---|---|---|---|---|---|
| Paris Burns | 1 | G | 5'11" | 165 | Senior | Chicago, IL | Graduated |
| Gabe Snider | 2 | G | 6'3" | 180 | Senior | Chicago, IL | Graduated |
| Julian Torres | 15 | F/C | 6'9" | 265 | Freshman | Bolingbrook, IL | Transferred to SIU Edwardsville |
| Drew Hackett | 22 | G | 6'2" | 180 | Freshman | Munster, IN | Transferred |
| Najeal Young | 23 | G/F | 6'6" | 225 | Junior | Milwaukee, WI | Transferred to Texas Wesleyan |
| Hans-Christian Lauer | 32 | F | 6'7" | 220 | Junior | Klein-Winternheim, Germany | Walk-on; transferred |
| Markese McGuire | 34 | G | 6'3" | 190 | Junior | Elkhart, IN | Graduate transferred to Central State |
| Jake Wiegand | 40 | F | 6'8" | 245 | Senior | Herndon, VA | Graduated |

=== Incoming transfers ===
| Name | Number | Pos. | Height | Weight | Year | Hometown | Previous School |
|---|---|---|---|---|---|---|---|
| Kyle Guice | 22 | F | 6'8" | | Junior | Coeur d'Alene, ID | Junior college transferred from North Idaho College |

== Recruiting class of 2016 ==
College recruiting information
| Name | Hometown | School | Height | Weight | Commit date |
|---|---|---|---|---|---|
| K.J. Santos #37 SF | Geneva, IL | Sunrise Christian Academy | 6 ft 7 in (2.01 m) | 185 lb (84 kg) | Nov 12, 2015 |
| K.J. Santos #37 SF | Recruit ratings: Scout: Rivals: (77) | | | | |
| Marcus Ottey #58 SG | Ajax, ON | Spire Institute | 6 ft 1 in (1.85 m) | 165 lb (75 kg) | |
| Marcus Ottey #58 SG | Recruit ratings: Scout: Rivals: (74) | | | | |
| Jordan Blount; SG | Geneva, OH | Spire Institute | 6 ft 7 in (2.01 m) | N/A | Nov 4, 2015 |
| Jordan Blount; SG | Recruit ratings: Scout: Rivals: (NR) | | | | |
| Tarkus Ferguson; SG | Belleville, IL | Althoff Catholic High School | 6 ft 4 in (1.93 m) | 180 lb (82 kg) | Oct 3, 2015 |
| Tarkus Ferguson; SG | Recruit ratings: Scout: Rivals: (NR) | | | | |
| Godwin Boahen; PG | Toronto, ON | The Hill Academy | 5 ft 11 in (1.80 m) | 175 lb (79 kg) | |
| Godwin Boahen; PG | Recruit ratings: Scout: Rivals: (NR) | | | | |
Overall recruit ranking:
Note: In many cases, Scout, Rivals, 247Sports, On3, and ESPN may conflict in their listings of height and weight.; In these cases, the average was taken. ESPN grades are on a 100-point scale.; Sources: "2016 Team Ranking". Rivals.

=== Recruiting class of 2017 ===
College recruiting information (2017)
| Name | Hometown | School | Height | Weight | Commit date |
|---|---|---|---|---|---|
| Greg Eboigbodin #53 PF | Detroit, MI | Univ. of Detroit Jesuit High School | 6 ft 9 in (2.06 m) | N/A | Oct 11, 2016 |
| Greg Eboigbodin #53 PF | Recruit ratings: Scout: Rivals: (77) | | | | |
Overall recruit ranking:
Note: In many cases, Scout, Rivals, 247Sports, On3, and ESPN may conflict in their listings of height and weight.; In these cases, the average was taken. ESPN grades are on a 100-point scale.; Sources: "2017 Team Ranking". Rivals.

== Roster ==
2016–17 UIC Flames men's basketball team
Players
Coaches

| Pos. | # | Name | Height | Weight | Year | Previous school | Hometown |
|---|---|---|---|---|---|---|---|
| G | 0 | Dominique Matthews | 6 ft 2 in (1.88 m) | 190 lb (86 kg) | RS Fr | St. Rita of Cascia High School | Chicago, Illinois |
| G | 1 | Michael Kolawole | 6 ft 5 in (1.96 m) | 195 lb (88 kg) | So | Rowlett High School | Rowlett, Texas |
| F | 2 | K. J. Santos | 6 ft 8 in (2.03 m) | 200 lb (91 kg) | Fr | Sunrise Christian Academy | Geneva, Illinois |
| F | 3 | Hassan Thomas | 6 ft 7 in (2.01 m) | 210 lb (95 kg) | So | Woodrow Wilson High School | Dallas, Texas |
| G/F | 4 | Lance Whitaker | 6 ft 4 in (1.93 m) | 210 lb (95 kg) | RS Jr | Bartlett High School | Bartlett, Illinois |
| G | 5 | Tarkus Ferguson | 6 ft 4 in (1.93 m) | 180 lb (82 kg) | Fr | Althoff Catholic High School | Belleville, Illinois |
| F | 10 | Dikembe Dixson | 6 ft 7 in (2.01 m) | 200 lb (91 kg) | So | Mingo Central Comprehensive High School | Matewan, West Virginia |
| F | 13 | Jordan Blount | 6 ft 8 in (2.03 m) | 200 lb (91 kg) | Fr | SPIRE Academy | Cork, Ireland |
| G | 15 | Godwin Boahen | 5 ft 11 in (1.8 m) | 175 lb (79 kg) | Fr | The Hill Academy | Toronto, Ontario, Canada |
| F/C | 21 | Tai Odiase | 6 ft 9 in (2.06 m) | 220 lb (100 kg) | Jr | Homewood-Flossmoor High School | Glenwood, Illinois |
| F/C | 22 | Kyle Guice | 6 ft 8 in (2.03 m) | 225 lb (102 kg) | Jr | North Idaho College | Coeur d'Alene, Idaho |
| G | 23 | Marcus Ottey | 6 ft 2 in (1.88 m) | 175 lb (79 kg) | Fr | SPIRE Academy | Ajax, Ontario, Canada |
| G | 25 | Josh Joiner (W) | 6 ft 1 in (1.85 m) | 170 lb (77 kg) | Sr | Kennedy–King College | Chicago, Illinois |
| F/C | 32 | Clint Robinson | 6 ft 8 in (2.03 m) | 235 lb (107 kg) | Jr | State Fair Community College | Montego Bay, Jamaica |

Head coach

- Steve McClain (Chadron State)

Assistant coach(es)

- Ron Coleman (Lamar)
- Brendan Mullins (Saint Michael's)
- Seth Cooper (Edgewood)

Legend

- (C) Team captain
- (S) Suspended
- (I) Ineligible
- (W) Walk-on
- Injured
- Current redshirt

Roster

== Schedule and results ==
| Date time, TV | Rank^{#} | Opponent^{#} | Result | Record | High points | High rebounds | High assists | Site (attendance) city, state |
Exhibition
| Nov 5*; 3:00 pm, ESPN3 | | Judson | W 95–78 | | 34 – Dixson | 6 – Robinson | 4 – Santos | UIC Pavilion (1,661); Chicago, IL |
Non-conference regular season
| Nov 11*; 10:00 pm | | at San Francisco | L 80–82 | 0–1 | 15 – Dixson | 8 – Santo | 7 – Boahen | War Memorial Gymnasium (2,163); San Francisco, CA |
| Nov 16*; 7:00 pm, CSNCH/ESPN3 | | UTSA | W 86–78 | 1–1 | 31 – Dixson | 9 – Dixson | 2 – 4 tied | UIC Pavilion (3,571); Chicago, IL |
| Nov 19*; 7:00 pm, ESPN3 | | Trinity Christian | W 102–66 | 2–1 | 20 – Odiase | 9 – Dixson | 5 – Ferguson | UIC Pavilion (1,713); Chicago, IL |
| Nov 23*; 4:30 pm | | vs. Elon; NIU Thanksgiving Classic | L 80–91 | 2–2 | 32 – Dixson | 10 – Dixson | 3 – Dixson & Ferguson | Convocation Center (844); DeKalb, IL |
| Nov 25*; 3:30 pm | | vs. Cal Poly; NIU Thanksgiving Classic | W 84–71 | 3–2 | 24 – Dixson | 6 – 3 tied | 3 – Ferguson & Boahen | Convocation Center (712); DeKalb, IL |
| Nov 26*; 3:30 pm | | at Northern Illinois; NIU Thanksgiving Classic | L 81–92 | 3–3 | 31 – Dixson | 5 – Dixson & Odiase | 2 – Santos & Matthews | Convocation Center (1,398); DeKalb, IL |
| Nov 30*; 7:00 pm, ESPN3 | | Chicago State | W 74–58 | 4–3 | 20 – Dixson | 8 – Odiase | 4 – Boahen & Ferguson | UIC Pavilion (3,718); Chicago, IL |
| Dec 4*; 3:00 pm, ESPN3 | | Eastern Illinois | L 76–90 | 4–4 | 16 – Ottey | 7 – Odiase & Robinson | 5 – Ferguson | UIC Pavilion (1,786); Chicago, IL |
| Dec 10*; 8:00 pm | | at Grand Canyon | L 69–73 | 4–5 | 19 – Dixson | 9 – Odiase | 2 – Ottey & Kolawole | GCU Arena (6,804); Phoenix, AZ |
| Dec 14*; 7:00 pm, FS1 | | at DePaul | L 70–75 | 5–5 | 14 – Guice | 6 – Ferguson & Robinson | 5 – Ferguson | McGrath–Phillips Arena (2,099); Chicago, IL |
| Dec 17*; 3:00 pm, ESPN3 | | Loyola–Chicago | L 75–81 ^{OT} | 5–6 | 14 – Santos | 10 – Odiase | 4 – Boahen & Feruson | UIC Pavilion (2,376); Chicago, IL |
| Dec 20*; 7:00 pm | | Northern Arizona | W 75–65 | 6–6 | 24 – Odiase | 11 – Odiase | 9 – Ferguson | UIC Pavilion (2,810); Chicago, IL |
| Dec 22*; 7:00 pm, ESPN3 | | Roosevelt | W 91–53 | 7–6 | 18 – Odiase | 12 – Boahen | 11 – Boahen | UIC Pavilion (2,647); Chicago, IL |
Horizon League regular season
| Dec 30; 4:00 pm, ESPNU | | Valparaiso | L 59–70 | 7–7 (0–1) | 16 – Ferguson | 7 – Odiase | 5 – Guice | UIC Pavilion (3,826); Chicago, IL |
| Jan 6; 7:00 pm, ESPN3 | | Detroit | W 78–64 | 8–7 (1–1) | 16 – Ferguson | 6 – Ferguson & Boahen | 7 – Boahen | UIC Pavilion (1,832); Chicago, IL |
| Jan 8; 4:00 pm, ASN | | Oakland | L 57–58 | 8–8 (1–2) | 15 – Ferguson | 13 – Odiase | 4 – Ferguson | UIC Pavilion (1,970); Chicago, IL |
| Jan 12; 6:45 pm, ESPN3 | | at Cleveland State | W 59–54 | 9–8 (2–2) | 11 – Robinson & Matthews | 9 – Santos | 3 – Santos & Ferguson | Wolstein Center (1,393); Cleveland, OH |
| Jan 14; 6:00 pm, ESPN3 | | at Youngstown State | W 92–89 ^{OT} | 10–8 (3–2) | 21 – Matthews | 10 – Ferguson | 3 – 3 tied | Beeghly Center (2,787); Youngstown, OH |
| Jan 17; 6:00 pm, ESPN3 | | at Milwaukee | W 71–57 | 11–8 (4–2) | 20 – Odiase | 12 – Odiase | 6 – Ferguson | UW–Milwaukee Panther Arena (2,726); Milwaukee, WI |
| Jan 22; 4:00 pm, ASN | | at Valparaiso | L 65–96 | 11–9 (4–3) | 12 – Ferguson & Matthews | 5 – 3 tied | 6 – Ferguson | Athletics–Recreation Center (3,881); Valparaiso, IN |
| Jan 27; 7:00 pm, ESPN3 | | Northern Kentucky | L 62–79 | 11–10 (4–4) | 19 – Boahen | 7 – 3 tied | 6 – Ferguson | UIC Pavilion (2,898); Chicago, IL |
| Jan 29; 3:00 pm, ESPN3 | | Wright State | L 86–88 | 11–11 (4–5) | 17 – Kolawole | 10 – Fergusan | 9 – Fergusan | UIC Pavilion (2,508); Chicago, IL |
| Feb 2; 7:00 pm, ESPN3 | | at Green Bay | L 80–84 | 11–12 (4–6) | 22 – Matthews | 13 – Odiase | 5 – Ferguson | Resch Center (2,760); Green Bay, WI |
| Feb 4; 2:00 pm, ESPN3 | | Milwaukee | W 105–100 ^{OT} | 12–12 (5–6) | 25 – Ferguson | 7 – Kolawole | 11 – Ferguson | UIC Pavilion (1,622); Chicago, IL |
| Feb 9; 7:00 pm, CSNCH/ESPN3 | | Youngstown State | W 84–81 | 13–12 (6–6) | 28 – Matthews | 10 – Robinson | 6 – Ottey & Ferguson | UIC Pavilion (5,519); Chicago, IL |
| Feb 11; 3:00 pm, ESPN3 | | Cleveland State | L 63–66 | 13–13 (6–7) | 17 – Odiase | 7 – Odiase | 6 – Ferguson | UIC Pavilion (4,711); Chicago, IL |
| Feb 17; 6:00 pm, ESPN3 | | at Detroit | W 74–69 | 14–13 (7–7) | 20 – Ferguson | 8 – Robinson | 3 – Ferguson | Calihan Hall (1,203); Detroit, MI |
| Feb 19; 2:00 pm, ESPN3 | | at Oakland | L 75–87 | 14–14 (7–8) | 16 – Odiase | 14 – Odiase | 16 – Ferguson | Athletics Center O'rena (2,638); Rochester, MI |
| Feb 21; 7:00 pm, CSNCH/ESPN3 | | Green Bay | L 79–87 | 14–15 (7–9) | 16 – Odiase | 12 – Odiase | 8 – Ferguson | UIC Pavilion (3,583); Chicago, IL |
| Feb 24; 6:30 pm, ESPN3 | | at Northern Kentucky | L 82–90 | 14–16 (7–10) | 25 – Ottey | 10 – Ferguson | 7 – Ferguson | BB&T Arena (3,025); Highland Heights, KY |
| Feb 26; 1:00 pm, ESPN3 | | at Wright State | L 49–87 | 14–17 (7–11) | 18 – Kolawole | 6 – Tied | 1 – 4 Tied | Nutter Center; Dayton, OH |
Horizon League tournament
| Mar 5; 5:00 pm, ESPN3 | (6) | vs. (3) Green Bay; Quarterfinals | W 79–70 | 15–17 | 16 – Odiase | 10 – Fergusen | 5 – Fergusen | Joe Louis Arena (5,654); Detroit, MI |
| Mar 6; 8:00 pm, ESPNU | (6) | vs. (10) Milwaukee; Semifinals | L 68–74 | 15–18 | 21 – Matthews | 7 – Robinson | 4 – Boahen | Joe Louis Arena (3,708); Detroit, MI |
CBI
| Mar 16*; 7:00 pm | | Stony Brook; First Round | W 71–69 | 16–18 | 21 – Matthews | 7 – Ferguson | 10 – Ferguson | UIC Pavilion (1,197); Chicago, IL |
| Mar 20*; 7:00 pm | | George Washington; Quarterfinals | W 80–71 | 17–18 | 23 – Odiase | 10 – Ferguson | 12 – Ferguson | UIC Pavilion (1,048); Chicago, IL |
| Mar 22*; 6:00 pm | | at Coastal Carolina; Semifinals | L 78–89 | 17–19 | 27 – Ferguson | 7 – Ferguson | 4 – Tied | HTC Center; Conway, SC |
*Non-conference game. ^{#}Rankings from AP Poll. (#) Tournament seedings in parentheses. All times are in Central Time.
