= 2016–17 Valparaiso Crusaders men's basketball team =

American college basketball season

2016–17 Valparaiso Crusaders men's basketball

Men Who Speak Up Main Event champions Horizon League regular season co-champions

NIT, First round
- Conference: Horizon League
- Record: 24–9 (14–4 Horizon)
- Head coach: Matt Lottich (1st season)
- Assistant coaches: Luke Gore; David Ragland; Jackie Manuel
- Home arena: Athletics–Recreation Center

2016–17 Horizon League men's basketball standings
| | Conf. | | | | Overall |
| Team | W | | L | PCT | W | | L | PCT |
|---|---|---|---|---|---|---|---|---|
| Oakland | 14 | – | 4 | .778 | 25 | – | 9 | .735 |
| Valparaiso | 14 | – | 4 | .778 | 24 | – | 9 | .727 |
| Green Bay | 12 | – | 6 | .667 | 18 | – | 14 | .563 |
| Northern Kentucky † | 12 | – | 6 | .667 | 24 | – | 11 | .686 |
| Wright State | 11 | – | 7 | .611 | 20 | – | 12 | .625 |
| UIC | 7 | – | 11 | .389 | 17 | – | 19 | .472 |
| Detroit | 6 | – | 12 | .333 | 8 | – | 23 | .258 |
| Cleveland State | 5 | – | 13 | .278 | 9 | – | 22 | .290 |
| Youngstown State | 5 | – | 13 | .278 | 13 | – | 21 | .382 |
| Milwaukee | 4 | – | 14 | .222 | 11 | – | 24 | .314 |
† 2017 Horizon League Tournament winner

The 2016–17 Valparaiso Crusaders men's basketball team represented Valparaiso University during the 2016–17 NCAA Division I men's basketball season. The Crusaders, led by first-year head coach Matt Lottich, played their home games at the Athletics–Recreation Center as members of the Horizon League. They finished the season 24–9, 14–4 in Horizon League play to finish in a tie for the Horizon League regular season championship. As the No. 2 seed in the Horizon League tournament, they lost to Milwaukee in the quarterfinals. They received an invitation to the National Invitation Tournament where they lost in the first round to Illinois.

This was the Crusaders' final season as a member of the Horizon League as the school announced on May 25, 2017, that it would be joining the Missouri Valley Conference effective July 1, 2017.

== Previous season ==
The Crusaders finished the 2015–16 season 30–7, 16–2 in Horizon League play to win the regular season championship. They lost in the semifinals of the Horizon League tournament to Green Bay. As a regular season conference champion who failed to win their conference tournament, the Crusaders received an automatic bid to the National Invitation Tournament. As one of the last four teams left out of the NCAA tournament, they received a No. 1 seed in the NIT where they defeated Texas Southern, Florida State, Saint Mary's, and BYU to advance to the championship game where they lost to George Washington.

This season marked Bryce Drew's final season as Valparaiso head coach. He accepted the Vanderbilt head coaching job on April 5, 2016. He finished at Valpo with a five-year record of 124–49 and went to the postseason every year as head coach. On April 7, the school promoted assistant coach Matt Lottich to head coach.

== Offseason ==
=== Departures ===
| Name | Number | Pos. | Height | Weight | Year | Hometown | Notes |
|---|---|---|---|---|---|---|---|
| Keith Carter | 0 | G | 6'1" | 180 | Senior | Maywood, IL | Graduated |
| E. Victor Nickerson | 1 | G/F | 6'8" | 185 | Senior | Atlanta, GA | Graduated |
| Darien Walker | 5 | G | 6'3" | 220 | Senior | Chicago, IL | Graduated |
| David Skara | 10 | F | 6'8" | 205 | Sophomore | Zadar, Croatia | Transferred to Clemson |
| Vashil Fernandez | 14 | F | 6'10" | 260 | Senior | Kingston, Jamaica | Graduated |

=== Incoming transfers ===
| Name | Number | Pos. | Height | Weight | Year | Hometown | Previous school |
|---|---|---|---|---|---|---|---|
| Bakari Evelyn | 3 | G | 6'2" | 175 | Sophomore | Detroit, MI | Transferred from Nebraska. Under NCAA transfer rules, Evelyn had to sit out the 2016–17 season, and would then have three years of remaining eligibility. |
| Joe Burton | 10 | G/F | 6'6" | 215 | Junior | Houston, TX | Transferred from Oklahoma State. Under NCAA transfer rules, Burton had to sit out the 2016–17 season, and would then have two years of remaining eligibility. |
| John Middleton | 13 | G | 6'4" | 215 | Sophomore | Atlantic City, NJ | Transferred from Utah State. Under NCAA transfer rules, Middleton had to sit out the 2016–17 season, and would then have three years of remaining eligibility. |

=== 2016 recruiting class ===
College recruiting information
| Name | Hometown | School | Height | Weight | Commit date |
|---|---|---|---|---|---|
| Micah Bradford; PG | Bradley, Illinois | Bradley-Bourbonnais Community High School | 6 ft 0 in (1.83 m) | 150 lb (68 kg) | Nov 18, 2015 |
| Micah Bradford; PG | Recruit ratings: Rivals: | | | | |
Overall recruit ranking:
Note: In many cases, Scout, Rivals, 247Sports, On3, and ESPN may conflict in their listings of height and weight.; In these cases, the average was taken. ESPN grades are on a 100-point scale.; Sources:

=== 2017 recruiting class ===
College recruiting information (2017)
| Name | Hometown | School | Height | Weight | Commit date |
|---|---|---|---|---|---|
| Parker Hazen #42 SF | Columbia City, Indiana | Columbia City High School | 6 ft 7 in (2.01 m) | 188 lb (85 kg) | |
| Parker Hazen #42 SF | Recruit ratings: Rivals: (78) | | | | |
Overall recruit ranking:
Note: In many cases, Scout, Rivals, 247Sports, On3, and ESPN may conflict in their listings of height and weight.; In these cases, the average was taken. ESPN grades are on a 100-point scale.; Sources:

== Preseason ==
In a poll of the league's coaches, media, and sports information directors, Valparaiso was picked to win the conference, receiving 35 of the 39 first-place votes. Alec Peters was named the Preseason Horizon League player of the year. Shane Hammink was also named to the Preseason All-Horizon League second team.

== Roster ==
2016–17 Valparaiso Crusaders men's basketball team
Players
Coaches

| Pos. | # | Name | Height | Weight | Year | Previous school | Hometown |
|---|---|---|---|---|---|---|---|
| G | 1 | Micah Bradford | 6 ft 2 in (1.88 m) | 150 lb (68 kg) | Fr | Bradley-Bourbonnais Community High School | Bradley, Illinois |
| G | 2 | Tevonn Walker | 6 ft 2 in (1.88 m) | 200 lb (91 kg) | Jr | Vanier College | Montreal, Quebec, Canada |
| G | 3 | Max Joseph | 6 ft 1 in (1.85 m) | 210 lb (95 kg) | Jr | Vanier College | Montreal, Quebec, Canada |
| G | 4 | Bakari Evelyn (I) (redshirt) | 6 ft 2 in (1.88 m) | 180 lb (82 kg) | So | Nebraska | Detroit, Michigan |
| G | 5 | Jason Karys (W) | 6 ft 1 in (1.85 m) | 175 lb (79 kg) | Sr | Newton South High School | Newton, Massachusetts |
| G/F | 10 | Joe Burton (I) (redshirt) | 6 ft 6 in (1.98 m) | 210 lb (95 kg) | Jr | Oklahoma State | Porter, Texas |
| G | 11 | Shane Hammink | 6 ft 7 in (2.01 m) | 210 lb (95 kg) | RS Sr | LSU | Millingen aan de Rijn, Netherlands |
| G | 13 | John Middleton (I) (redshirt) | 6 ft 3 in (1.91 m) | 215 lb (98 kg) | So | Utah State | Atlantic City, New Jersey |
| C | 14 | Jaume Sorolla | 6 ft 11 in (2.11 m) | 240 lb (109 kg) | Fr | Sunrise Christian Academy | Tortosa, Spain |
| G | 15 | Lexus Williams | 6 ft 0 in (1.83 m) | 165 lb (75 kg) | RS Jr | Marist | Chicago, Illinois |
| C | 21 | Derrik Smits | 7 ft 2 in (2.18 m) | 240 lb (109 kg) | RS Fr | Zionsville Community High School | Zionsville, Indiana |
| G | 22 | Nick Davidson | 6 ft 4 in (1.93 m) | 195 lb (88 kg) | Sr | Andrean High School | Munster, Indiana |
| F | 23 | Jubril Adekoya | 6 ft 7 in (2.01 m) | 230 lb (104 kg) | Sr | Victor J. Andrew High School | Tinley Park, Illinois |
| F | 25 | Alec Peters | 6 ft 9 in (2.06 m) | 235 lb (107 kg) | Sr | Washington Community High School | Washington, Illinois |
| F | 30 | Chandler Levingston Simon (W) | 6 ft 7 in (2.01 m) | 220 lb (100 kg) | RS Jr | UMKC | Vernon Hills, Illinois |
| G/F | 33 | John Kiser (W) | 6 ft 5 in (1.96 m) | 205 lb (93 kg) | Fr | Noblesville High School | Noblesville, Indiana |

Head coach

- Matt Lottich (Stanford)

Assistant coach(es)

- Luke Gore (Bethel (IN))
- David Ragland (Southern Indiana)
- Jackie Manuel (North Carolina)

Legend

- (C) Team captain
- (S) Suspended
- (I) Ineligible
- (W) Walk-on
- Injured
- Current redshirt

Roster

== Schedule and results ==
| Date time, TV | Rank^{#} | Opponent^{#} | Result | Record | Site (attendance) city, state |
Exhibition
| 11/05/2016*; 7:30 pm | | Hillsdale | W 78–63 | | Athletics–Recreation Center; Valparaiso, IN |
Non-conference regular season
| 11/11/2016*; 7:00 pm | | Southern Utah; Men Who Speak Up Main Event | W 79–65 | 1–0 | Athletics–Recreation Center (3,560); Valparaiso, IN |
| 11/12/2016*; 7:00 pm | | Trinity Christian | W 89–75 | 2–0 | Athletics–Recreation Center (2,588); Valparaiso, IN |
| 11/14/2016*; 7:00 pm | | Coppin State; Men Who Speak Up Main Event | W 78–58 | 3–0 | Athletics–Recreation Center (1,972); Valparaiso, IN |
| 11/17/2016*; 8:00 pm, P12N | | at No. 4 Oregon | L 54–76 | 3–1 | Matthew Knight Arena (7,509); Eugene, OR |
| 11/21/2016*; 11:00 pm, YouTube | | vs. Alabama; Men Who Speak Up Main Event semifinals | W 68–60 | 4–1 | MGM Grand Garden Arena (2,107); Paradise, NV |
| 11/23/2016*; 10:59 pm, ESPN2 | | vs. BYU; Men Who Speak Up Main Event championship | W 92–89 | 5–1 | MGM Grand Garden Arena; Paradise, NV |
| 11/27/2016*; 1:30 pm | | Ball State | W 79–73 | 6–1 | Athletics–Recreation Center (3,166); Valparaiso, IN |
| 11/29/2016*; 7:00 pm, ESPN3 | | No. 21 Rhode Island | W 65–62 | 7–1 | Athletics–Recreation Center (4,149); Valparaiso, IN |
| 12/07/2016*; 7:00 pm, SECN | | at No. 6 Kentucky | L 63–87 | 7–2 | Rupp Arena (21,805); Lexington, KY |
| 12/10/2016*; 7:05 pm, ESPN3 | | at Missouri State | W 84–81 | 8–2 | JQH Arena (6,147); Springfield, MO |
| 12/17/2016*; 7:03 pm, ESPN3 | | Indiana State | W 89–71 | 9–2 | Athletics–Recreation Center (2,172); Valparaiso, IN |
| 12/22/2016*; 7:00 pm | | Santa Clara | L 80–87 ^{OT} | 9–3 | Athletics–Recreation Center (1,854); Valparaiso, IN |
| 12/28/2016*; 7:00 pm | | Chicago State | W 80–61 | 10–3 | Athletics–Recreation Center (2,024); Valparaiso, IN |
Horizon League regular season
| 12/30/2016; 4:00 pm, ESPNU | | at UIC | W 70–59 | 11–3 (1–0) | UIC Pavilion (3,826); Chicago, IL |
| 01/06/2017; 8:05 pm, ESPN2 | | Oakland | L 66–78 | 11–4 (1–1) | Athletics–Recreation Center (3,872); Valparaiso, IN |
| 01/08/2017; 12:00 pm, ASN | | Detroit | W 81–74 | 12–4 (2–1) | Athletics–Recreation Center (1,776); Valparaiso, IN |
| 01/12/2017; 6:45 pm, ESPN3 | | at Youngstown State | W 78–62 | 13–4 (3–1) | Beeghly Center (2,517); Youngstown, OH |
| 01/14/2017; 2:30 pm, ESPN3 | | at Cleveland State | W 78–67 | 14–4 (4–1) | Wolstein Center (1,831); Cleveland, OH |
| 01/16/2017; 7:00 pm, ESPN3 | | Green Bay | W 80–56 | 15–4 (5–1) | Athletics–Recreation Center (3,625); Valparaiso, IN |
| 01/22/2017; 2:00 pm, ASN | | UIC | W 96–65 | 16–4 (6–1) | Athletics–Recreation Center (3,881); Valparaiso, IN |
| 01/27/2017; 7:00 pm, ESPN3 | | Wright State | W 70–55 | 17–4 (7–1) | Athletics–Recreation Center (3,461); Valparaiso, IN |
| 01/29/2017; 1:30 pm, ESPN3 | | Northern Kentucky | W 65–58 | 18–4 (8–1) | Athletics–Recreation Center (3,578); Valparaiso, IN |
| 02/02/2017; 2:00 pm, ESPN3 | | at Milwaukee | W 71–53 | 19–4 (9–1) | UW–Milwaukee Panther Arena (2,267); Milwaukee, WI |
| 02/04/2017; 2:00 pm, ESPN3 | | at Green Bay | L 69–86 | 19–5 (9–2) | Resch Center (3,963); Green Bay, WI |
| 02/09/2017; 7:00 pm, ESPN3 | | Cleveland State | W 78–57 | 20–5 (10–2) | Athletics–Recreation Center (2,455); Valparaiso, IN |
| 02/11/2017; 7:00 pm, ESPN3 | | Youngstown State | W 82–72 | 21–5 (11–2) | Athletics–Recreation Center (4,823); Valparaiso, IN |
| 02/16/2017; 6:00 pm, ESPN2 | | at Oakland | L 71–82 | 21–6 (11–3) | Athletics Center O'rena; Rochester, MI |
| 02/19/2017; 1:00 pm, ESPN3 | | at Detroit | W 83–63 | 22–6 (12–3) | Calihan Hall (2,003); Detroit, MI |
| 02/21/2017; 7:00 pm, ESPN3 | | Milwaukee | W 67–61 | 23–6 (13–3) | Athletics–Recreation Center (3,512); Valparaiso, IN |
| 02/24/2017; 6:30 pm, ESPN3 | | at Wright State | W 84-74 | 24–6 (14–3) | Nutter Center (5,028); Dayton, OH |
| 02/26/2017; 1:00 pm, ESPN3 | | at Northern Kentucky | L 78–82 | 24–7 (14–4) | BB&T Arena (3,304); Highland Heights, KY |
Horizon League tournament
| 03/04/2017; 8:00 pm, ESPN3 | (2) | vs. (10) Milwaukee; Quarterfinals | L 41–43 | 24–8 | Joe Louis Arena (8,481); Detroit, MI |
NIT
| 03/14/2017*; 6:15 pm, ESPN2 | (7) | at (2) Illinois; First round – Illinois State Bracket | L 57–82 | 24–9 | State Farm Center (4,719); Champaign, IL |
*Non-conference game. ^{#}Rankings from AP Poll. (#) Tournament seedings in parentheses. All times are in Central Time.
