= 2016–17 Milwaukee Panthers men's basketball team =

American college basketball season

2016–17 Milwaukee Panthers men's basketball
- Conference: Horizon League
- Record: 11–24 (4–14 Horizon)
- Head coach: LaVall Jordan (1st season)
- Assistant coaches: Todd Townsend; Omar Lowery; Will Vergollo
- Home arena: UW–Milwaukee Panther Arena; Klotsche Center

2016–17 Horizon League men's basketball standings
	Conf.				Overall
Team	W		L	PCT	W		L	PCT
Oakland	14	–	4	.778	25	–	9	.735
Valparaiso	14	–	4	.778	24	–	9	.727
Green Bay	12	–	6	.667	18	–	14	.563
Northern Kentucky †	12	–	6	.667	24	–	11	.686
Wright State	11	–	7	.611	20	–	12	.625
UIC	7	–	11	.389	17	–	19	.472
Detroit	6	–	12	.333	8	–	23	.258
Cleveland State	5	–	13	.278	9	–	22	.290
Youngstown State	5	–	13	.278	13	–	21	.382
Milwaukee	4	–	14	.222	11	–	24	.314
† 2017 Horizon League Tournament winner

The 2016–17 Milwaukee Panthers men's basketball team represented the University of Wisconsin–Milwaukee during the 2016–17 NCAA Division I men's basketball season. The Panthers, led by first-year head coach LaVall Jordan, played their home games at the UW–Milwaukee Panther Arena and the Klotsche Center as members of the Horizon League. They finished the season 11–24, 4–14 in Horizon League play to finish in last place. They defeated Detroit, Valparaiso and UIC to advance to the championship game of the Horizon League tournament where they lost to Northern Kentucky.

On June 12, 2017, head coach LaVall Jordan left the school to accept the head coaching position at Butler, his alma mater. On June 20, the school named Northwestern assistant Patrick Baldwin head coach.

== Previous season ==
The Panthers finished the 2015–16 season 20–13, 10–8 in Horizon League play to finish in fifth place. They defeated Northern Kentucky in the first round of the Horizon League tournament to advance to the second round where they lost to Green Bay. Despite having 20 wins, they did not participate in a postseason tournament.

On March 17, 2016 head coach Rob Jeter was fired. He finished at Milwaukee with an 11-year record of 185–170. On April 7, the school hired LaVall Jordan as head coach.

== Departures ==
Name	Number	Pos.	Height	Weight	Year	Hometown	Notes
Jordan Johnson	1	G	5'9"	175	RS Junior	Waukegan, IL	Transferred to UNLV
Akeem Springs	2	G	6'4"	210	Junior	Waukegan, IL	Graduate transferred to Minnesota
JayQuan McCloud	11	G	6'2"	175	Sophomore	Waukegan, IL	Transferred
J. J. Panoske	23	F	6'10"	225	Senior	Brodhead, WI	Graduated
J. R. Lyle	30	G	6'2"	175	Senior	Kansas City, MO	Graduated
Matt Tiby	31	F	6'8"	230	Senior	Urbandale, IA	Graduated
Scotty Tyler	33	F	6'7"	205	Sophomore	Grafton, WI	Transferred to UW–Whitewater
Austin Arians	34	F	6'6"	200	RS Junior	Stoughton, WI	Graduate transferred to Wake Forest

=== Incoming transfers ===
Name	Number	Pos.	Height	Weight	Year	Hometown	Previous School
Cameron Harvey	31	G	6'3"	210	RS Senior	Naperville, IL	Transferred from Stetson. Will be eligible to play since Harvey graduated from Stetson.
Jeremiah Bell	1	G	6'0"	171	Soph	Louisville, KY	Transferred from Vincennes. Will be eligible to play since Bell graduated from Vincennes.

== Recruiting class of 2016 ==
College recruiting
Name	Hometown	School	Height	Weight	Commit date
Bryce Nze; SF	Waukesha, WI	Arrowhead High School	6 ft 7 in (2.01 m)	215 lb (98 kg)	Nov 5, 2015
Bryce Nze; SF	Recruit ratings: Scout: Rivals: (NR)				
Bryce Barnes; PG	Chicago, IL	Bogan High School	5 ft 11 in (1.80 m)	160 lb (73 kg)	Apr 26, 2016
Bryce Barnes; PG	Recruit ratings: Scout: Rivals: (NR)				
August Haas; PG	Copenhagen, Denmark	SISU Basketball Klub	6 ft 2 in (1.88 m)	N/A	May 13, 2015
August Haas; PG	Recruit ratings: Scout: Rivals: (NR)				
Zac Saddler; G/F	New Braunfels, TX	New Braunfels High School	6 ft 6 in (1.98 m)	N/A	May 20, 2016
Zac Saddler; G/F	Recruit ratings: Scout: Rivals: (NR)				
Overall recruit ranking:
Note: In many cases, Scout, Rivals, 247Sports, On3, and ESPN may conflict in their listings of height and weight.; In these cases, the average was taken. ESPN grades are on a 100-point scale.; Sources: "2016 Team Ranking". Rivals.

=== Recruiting class of 2017 ===
College recruiting (2017)
Name	Hometown	School	Height	Weight	Commit date
Dylan Alderson; PG	Davison, MI	Clarkston High School	6 ft 3 in (1.91 m)	N/A	Sep 20, 2016
Dylan Alderson; PG	Recruit ratings: Scout: Rivals: (NR)				
Overall recruit ranking:
Note: In many cases, Scout, Rivals, 247Sports, On3, and ESPN may conflict in their listings of height and weight.; In these cases, the average was taken. ESPN grades are on a 100-point scale.; Sources: "2017 Team Ranking". Rivals.

== Roster ==
2016–17 Milwaukee Panthers men's basketball team
Players
Coaches

Pos.	#	Name	Height	Weight	Year	Previous school	Hometown
G	0	Bryce Barnes	5 ft 11 in (1.8 m)	172 lb (78 kg)	Fr	Bogan High School	Chicago, Illinois
G	1	Jeremiah Bell	6 ft 0 in (1.83 m)	171 lb (78 kg)	So	Vincennes	Louisville, Kentucky
G	3	Brock Stull	6 ft 4 in (1.93 m)	195 lb (88 kg)	RS So	Boylan Catholic High School	Rockford, Illinois
G	4	Jeremy Johnson	6 ft 3 in (1.91 m)	175 lb (79 kg)	RS Fr	Champlin Park High School	Brooklyn Park, Minnesota
G	5	Cody Wichmann	6 ft 5 in (1.96 m)	210 lb (95 kg)	Sr	Pulaski High School	Pulaski, Wisconsin
G	10	Sam Burkart	5 ft 11 in (1.8 m)	195 lb (88 kg)	Fr	Xavier High School	Kaukauna, Wisconsin
F	11	Zac Saddler	6 ft 7 in (2.01 m)	200 lb (91 kg)	Fr	New Braunfels High School	New Braunfels, Texas
G	13	August Haas	6 ft 1 in (1.85 m)	187 lb (85 kg)	Fr	Gammel Hellerup Gymnasium	Copenhagen, Denmark
G	15	Baylor Peterson	6 ft 2 in (1.88 m)	180 lb (82 kg)	So	Edina High School	Edina, Minnesota
F	21	Dan Studer (W)	6 ft 7 in (2.01 m)	230 lb (104 kg)	Sr	Wisconsin–Stevens Point	Germantown, Wisconsin
F	23	Seth Dittmer	6 ft 9 in (2.06 m)	210 lb (95 kg)	Fr	Homeschooled	Pewaukee, Wisconsin
F	24	Bryce Nze	6 ft 7 in (2.01 m)	230 lb (104 kg)	Fr	Arrowhead High School	Hartland, Wisconsin
G	31	Cameron Harvey	6 ft 3 in (1.91 m)	205 lb (93 kg)	GS	Stetson	Collegeville, Pennsylvania
F	50	Brett Prahl	6 ft 9 in (2.06 m)	225 lb (102 kg)	RS Jr	East Troy High School	East Troy, Wisconsin
F	52	Alex Prahl (W)	6 ft 9 in (2.06 m)	225 lb (102 kg)	RS Jr	East Troy High School	East Troy, Wisconsin

Head coach

- LaVall Jordan (Butler)

Assistant coach(es)

- Todd Townsend (Marquette)
- Omar Lowery (Concordia (WI))
- Will Vergollo (Michigan)

Legend

- (C) Team captain
- (S) Suspended
- (I) Ineligible
- (W) Walk-on
- Injured
- Current redshirt

Roster

== Schedule and results ==
Date time, TV	Rank^{#}	Opponent^{#}	Result	Record	Site (attendance) city, state
Exhibition
11/05/2016*; 2:00 pm		Concordia (WI)	W 77–62		Klotsche Center (897); Milwaukee, WI
Non-conference regular season
11/11/2016*; 7:00 pm		MSOE; Sanford Pentagon Showcase	W 88–58	1–0	UW–Milwaukee Panther Arena (1,856); Milwaukee, WI
11/16/2016*; 7:00 pm, ESPN3		at Memphis	L 54–68	1–1	FedEx Forum (9,398); Memphis, TN
11/20/2016*; 12:30 pm, FS1		at DePaul	L 59–77	1–2	Allstate Arena (9,398); Rosemont, IL
11/25/2016*; 5:30 pm		vs. East Tennessee State; Sanford Pentagon Showcase	L 62–86	1-3	Sanford Pentagon (626); Sioux Falls, SD
11/26/2016*; 2:00 pm		vs. UC Irvine; Sanford Pentagon Showcase	W 54–37	2–3	Sanford Pentagon (379); Sioux Falls, SD
11/27/2016*; 2:30 pm, FSW		vs. South Dakota State; Sanford Pentagon Showcase	L 58–81	2–4	Sanford Pentagon (1,346); Sioux Falls, SD
11/30/2016*; 7:00 pm, ESPN3		Jacksonville	W 72–67	3–4	UW–Milwaukee Panther Arena (1,473); Milwaukee, WI
12/03/2016*; 8:00 pm		at Montana	L 69–75	3-5	Dahlberg Arena (3,369); Missoula, MT
12/05/2016*; 8:05 pm		at Montana State	W 83–78	4–5	Brick Breeden Fieldhouse (2,212); Bozeman, MT
12/10/2016*; 3:00 pm, ESPN3		at Loyola–Chicago	L 56–72	4–6	Joseph J. Gentile Arena (1,696); Chicago, IL
12/14/2016*; 6:00 pm, ESPN3		at Ohio	L 69–71	4–7	Convocation Center (4,271); Athens, OH
12/17/2016*; 2:00 pm, ESPN3		Western Illinois	L 59–75	4–8	Klotsche Center (893); Milwaukee, WI
12/19/2016*; 7:00 pm, ESPN3		Belmont	L 56–62	4–9	UW–Milwaukee Panther Arena (1,127); Milwaukee, WI
Horizon League regular season
12/29/2016; 6:00 pm, ESPN3		at Youngstown State	L 87–88 ^{OT}	4–10 (0–1)	Beeghly Center (2,854); Youngstown, OH
12/31/2016; 2:30 pm, ESPN3		at Cleveland State	L 53–62	4–11 (0–2)	Wolstein Center (1,013); Cleveland, OH
01/07/2017; 7:00 pm, Spectrum		at Green Bay	L 74–80	4–12 (0–3)	Resch Center (4,159); Green Bay, WI
01/12/2017; 7:00 pm, Spectrum		Northern Kentucky	W 68–58	5–12 (1–3)	UW–Milwaukee Panther Arena (1,389); Milwaukee, WI
01/14/2017; 2:00 pm, ESPN3		Wright State	L 67–70	5–13 (1–4)	UW–Milwaukee Panther Arena (1,402); Milwaukee, WI
01/17/2017; 7:00 pm, ESPN3		at UIC	L 57–71	5–14 (1–5)	UIC Pavilion (2,726); Chicago, IL
01/20/2017; 7:00 pm, ESPN3		Cleveland State	W 63–62	6–14 (2–5)	UW–Milwaukee Panther Arena (1,194); Milwaukee, WI
01/22/2017; 2:00 pm, ESPN3		Youngstown State	W 94–85 ^{OT}	7–14 (3–5)	UW–Milwaukee Panther Arena (641); Milwaukee, WI
01/27/2017; 6:00 pm, ESPN3		at Detroit	W 73–69 ^{OT}	8–14 (4–5)	Calihan Hall (1,751); Detroit, MI
01/29/2017; 12:00 pm, ASN		at Oakland	L 70–79 ^{OT}	8–15 (4–6)	Athletics Center O'rena (2,902); Rochester, MI
02/02/2017; 7:00 pm, ESPN3		Valparaiso	L 53–71	8–16 (4–7)	UW–Milwaukee Panther Arena (2,267); Milwaukee, WI
02/04/2017; 2:00 pm, ESPN3		UIC	L 100–105 ^{OT}	8–17 (4–8)	UW–Milwaukee Panther Arena (1,622); Milwaukee, WI
02/09/2017; 6:00 pm, ASN		at Wright State	L 65–76	8–18 (4–9)	Nutter Center (4,004); Dayton, OH
02/11/2017; 6:00 pm, ESPN3		at Northern Kentucky	L 63–69	8–19 (4–10)	BB&T Arena (4,963); Highland Heights, KY
02/18/2017; 1:00 pm, Spectrum/ESPN3		Green Bay	L 56–80	8–20 (4–11)	UW–Milwaukee Panther Arena (2,626); Milwaukee, WI
02/21/2017; 7:00 pm, ESPN3		at Valparaiso	L 61–67	8–21 (4–12)	Athletics–Recreation Center (3,512); Valparaiso, IN
02/24/2017; 7:00 pm, ESPN3		Detroit	L 74–81	8–22 (4–13)	Klotsche Center (1,273); Milwaukee, WI
02/26/2017; 2:00 pm, ESPN3		Oakland	L 75–86	8–23 (4–14)	Klotsche Center (1,227); Milwaukee, WI
Horizon League tournament
03/03/2017; 5:30 pm, ESPN3	(10)	vs. (7) Detroit; First Round	W 85–60	9–23	Joe Louis Arena (5,468); Detroit, MI
03/04/2017; 7:00 pm, ESPN3	(10)	vs. (2) Valparaiso; Quarterfinals	W 43–41	10–23	Joe Louis Arena (8,581); Detroit, MI
03/06/2017; 8:30 pm, ESPNU	(10)	vs. (6) UIC; Semifinals	W 74–68	11–23	Joe Louis Arena (3,708); Detroit, MI
03/07/2017; 7:00 pm, ESPN	(10)	vs. (4) Northern Kentucky; Championship game	L 53–59	11–24	Joe Louis Arena (5,929); Detroit, MI
*Non-conference game. ^{#}Rankings from AP Poll. (#) Tournament seedings in parentheses. All times are in Central Time.
