= 2016–17 Green Bay Phoenix men's basketball team =

American college basketball season

2016–17 Green Bay Phoenix men's basketball

CBI, First Round
- Conference: Horizon League
- Record: 18–14 (12–6 Horizon)
- Head coach: Linc Darner (2nd season)
- Assistant coaches: Randall Herbst; Richard Davis; Ben Swank
- Home arena: Resch Center

2016–17 Horizon League men's basketball standings
	Conf.				Overall
Team	W		L	PCT	W		L	PCT
Oakland	14	–	4	.778	25	–	9	.735
Valparaiso	14	–	4	.778	24	–	9	.727
Green Bay	12	–	6	.667	18	–	14	.563
Northern Kentucky †	12	–	6	.667	24	–	11	.686
Wright State	11	–	7	.611	20	–	12	.625
UIC	7	–	11	.389	17	–	19	.472
Detroit	6	–	12	.333	8	–	23	.258
Cleveland State	5	–	13	.278	9	–	22	.290
Youngstown State	5	–	13	.278	13	–	21	.382
Milwaukee	4	–	14	.222	11	–	24	.314
† 2017 Horizon League Tournament winner

The 2016–17 Green Bay Phoenix men's basketball team represented the University of Wisconsin–Green Bay in the 2016–17 NCAA Division I men's basketball season. The Phoenix, led by second-year head coach Linc Darner, played their home games at the Resch Center as members of the Horizon League. They finished the season 18–14, 12–6 in Horizon League play to finish in a tie for third place. In the Horizon League tournament, they lost to UIC in the quarterfinals. They received an invitation to the College Basketball Invitational where they lost in the first round to UMKC.

== Previous season ==
The Phoenix finished the 2015–16 season 23–13, 11–7 in Horizon League play to finish in fourth place. They defeated Cleveland State, Milwaukee, Valparaiso, and Wright State to win the Horizon League tournament. They received the conference's automatic bid to the NCAA tournament where they lost in the first round to Texas A&M.

== Departures ==
Name	Number	Pos.	Height	Weight	Year	Hometown	Notes
Carrington Love	12	G	6'1"	171	Senior	Milwaukee, WI	Graduated
Henry Uwadiae	50	F/C	6'8"	230	RS Junior	Benin City, Nigeria	Graduate transferred to Dominican

== Recruiting class of 2016 ==
College recruiting
Name	Hometown	School	Height	Weight	Commit date
Trevor Anderson; SG	Stevens Point, WI	Stevens Point Area Senior High School	6 ft 2 in (1.88 m)	180 lb (82 kg)	
Trevor Anderson; SG	Recruit ratings: Scout: Rivals: (NR)				
Kameron Hankerson; SF	Novi, MI	Novi High School	6 ft 5 in (1.96 m)	180 lb (82 kg)	
Kameron Hankerson; SF	Recruit ratings: Scout: Rivals: (NR)				
Overall recruit ranking:
Note: In many cases, Scout, Rivals, 247Sports, On3, and ESPN may conflict in their listings of height and weight.; In these cases, the average was taken. ESPN grades are on a 100-point scale.; Sources: "2016 Team Ranking". Rivals.

=== Recruiting class of 2017 ===
College recruiting (2017)
Name	Hometown	School	Height	Weight	Commit date
Caleb Coleman; SF	Hammond, IN	Hammond High School	6 ft 6 in (1.98 m)	170 lb (77 kg)	Jun 12, 2016
Caleb Coleman; SF	Recruit ratings: Scout: Rivals: (NR)				
Will Chevalier; PF	Kimberly, WI	Kimberly High School	6 ft 8 in (2.03 m)	200 lb (91 kg)	Jul 25, 2016
Will Chevalier; PF	Recruit ratings: Scout: Rivals: (NR)				
Trevian Bell; SF	Joliet, IL	Joliet High School	6 ft 5 in (1.96 m)	N/A	
Trevian Bell; SF	Recruit ratings: Scout: Rivals: (NR)				
P.J. Pipes; PG	Lemont, IL	Lemont High School	6 ft 2 in (1.88 m)	180 lb (82 kg)	Sep 16, 2016
P.J. Pipes; PG	Recruit ratings: Scout: Rivals: (NR)				
Overall recruit ranking:
Note: In many cases, Scout, Rivals, 247Sports, On3, and ESPN may conflict in their listings of height and weight.; In these cases, the average was taken. ESPN grades are on a 100-point scale.; Sources: "2017 Team Ranking". Rivals.

== Roster ==
2016–17 Green Bay Phoenix men's basketball team
Players
Coaches

Pos.	#	Name	Height	Weight	Year	Previous school	Hometown
G	0	Warren Jones	6 ft 3 in (1.91 m)	190 lb (86 kg)	RS Sr	Bradley	Centralia, Illinois
F	1	Kerem Kanter	6 ft 10 in (2.08 m)	240 lb (109 kg)	Jr	IMG Academy	Istanbul, Turkey
G	2	Turner Botz	6 ft 7 in (2.01 m)	215 lb (98 kg)	Sr	Little Chute High School	Little Chute, Wisconsin
G	3	Khalil Small	6 ft 2 in (1.88 m)	205 lb (93 kg)	Jr	Providence St. Mel School	Chicago, Illinois
G	5	Avery Brown	6 ft 2 in (1.88 m)	165 lb (75 kg)	So	Lake Minneola High School	Clermont, Florida
G	11	Anthony Brown	6 ft 1 in (1.85 m)	160 lb (73 kg)	So	Lake Minneola High School	Clermont, Florida
G	12	Trevor Anderson	6 ft 2 in (1.88 m)	180 lb (82 kg)	Fr	Stevens Point Area Senior High School	Stevens Point, Wisconsin
F	21	Kameron Hankerson	6 ft 5 in (1.96 m)	185 lb (84 kg)	Fr	Novi High School	Novi, Michigan
F	23	Jamar Hurdle	6 ft 7 in (2.01 m)	200 lb (91 kg)	Sr	Des Moines Area Community College	Milwaukee, Wisconsin
G	32	Tevin Findlay	6 ft 4 in (1.93 m)	190 lb (86 kg)	Sr	Quality Education Academy	Malton, Ontario
G	34	Charles Cooper	6 ft 4 in (1.93 m)	220 lb (100 kg)	Sr	Kaskaskia College	Gary, Indiana
F	35	Kaharri Carter	6 ft 5 in (1.96 m)	200 lb (91 kg)	So	Northeast Community College	Minneapolis, Minnesota
F	42	David Jesperson	6 ft 8 in (2.03 m)	210 lb (95 kg)	RS Jr	Pepperdine	Merrill, Wisconsin
F	45	Kenneth Lowe	6 ft 8 in (2.03 m)	230 lb (104 kg)	Sr	Little Chute High School	Little Chute, Wisconsin

Head coach

- Linc Darner (Purdue)

Assistant coach(es)

- Randall Herbst (Waldorf)
- Richard Davis (Ashland)
- Ben Swank (Edinboro)

Legend

- (C) Team captain
- (S) Suspended
- (I) Ineligible
- (W) Walk-on
- Injured
- Current redshirt

Roster

== Schedule and results ==
Date time, TV	Rank^{#}	Opponent^{#}	Result	Record	Site (attendance) city, state
Exhibition
11/01/2016*; 7:00 pm		Indiana Tech	W 98–65		Resch Center (1,975); Green Bay, WI
Non-Conference regular season
11/12/2016*; 12:00 pm, ESPN3		Northland	W 84–49	1–0	Resch Center (2,170); Green Bay, WI
11/15/2016*; 1:00 am, ESPN2		at Pacific; College Hoops Tip-Off Marathon	L 58–76	1–1	Alex G. Spanos Center (1,716); Stockton, CA
11/19/2016*; 6:00 pm		vs. Murray State; Bill Frack Tournament	L 77–93	1–2	Stroh Center (1,676); Bowling Green, OH
11/20/2016*; 5:00 pm, ESPN3		at Bowling Green; Bill Frack Tournament	W 77–61	2–2	Stroh Center (1,514); Bowling Green, OH
11/21/2016*; 3:00 pm		vs. UMKC; Bill Frack Tournament	W 95–77	3–2	Stroh Center; Bowling Green, OH
11/26/2016*; 2:00 pm, ESPN3		Central Michigan	L 77–89	3–3	Resch Center (2,799); Green Bay, WI
11/30/2016*; 7:00 pm, ESPN3/FSKC		at Kansas State	L 61–80	3–4	Bramlage Coliseum (10,769); Manhattan, KS
12/03/2016*; 6:00 pm		at Toledo	W 78–77	4–4	Savage Arena (4,291); Toledo, OH
12/06/2016*; 6:00 pm, ESPN3		at Central Michigan	L 97–107	4–5	McGuirk Arena (2,266); Mount Pleasant, MI
12/14/2016*; 8:00 pm, BTN		at No. 14 Wisconsin	L 59–73	4–6	Kohl Center (17,287); Madison, WI
12/17/2016*; 4:30 pm, ESPN3		Belmont; Postponed (snow), no makeup date announced			Resch Center; Green Bay, WI
12/19/2016*; 7:00 pm, ESPN3		SIU Edwardsville	W 94–92 ^{OT}	5–6	Resch Center (1,858); Green Bay, WI
12/22/2016*; 7:00 pm, ESPN3		Saint Mary's (MN)	W 108–59	6–6	Resch Center (2,186); Green Bay, WI
Horizon League regular season
12/29/2016; 6:00 pm, ESPN3		at Cleveland State	W 76–75 ^{OT}	7–6 (1–0)	Wolstein Center (1,441); Cleveland, OH
12/31/2016; 11:00 am, ESPN3		at Youngstown State	W 90–77	8–6 (2–0)	Beeghly Center (1,402); Youngstown, OH
01/06/2017; 7:00 pm, ESPN3		Milwaukee	W 80–74	9–6 (3–0)	Resch Center (4,159); Green Bay, WI
01/10/2017; 7:00 pm, ESPN3		Northern Kentucky	W 80–71	10–6 (4–0)	Resch Center (2,063); Green Bay, WI
01/12/2017; 7:00 pm, ESPN3		Wright State	W 78–61	11–6 (5–0)	Resch Center (2,416); Green Bay, WI
01/16/2017; 7:00 pm, ESPN3		at Valparaiso	L 59–80	11–7 (5–1)	Athletics–Recreation Center (3,625); Valparaiso, IN
01/20/2017; 7:00 pm, ESPN3		Youngstown State	L 89–92	11–8 (5–2)	Resch Center (2,991); Green Bay, WI
01/23/2017; 6:00 pm, ASN/ESPN3		Cleveland State	W 83–73	12–8 (6–2)	Resch Center (2,349); Green Bay, WI
01/27/2017; 8:00 pm, ESPNU		at Oakland	W 80–72	13–8 (7–2)	Athletics Center O'rena (3,239); Rochester, MI
01/29/2017; 1:00 pm, ESPN3		at Detroit	L 92–93	13–9 (7–3)	Calihan Hall (1,505); Detroit, MI
02/02/2017; 7:00 pm, ESPN3		UIC	W 84–80	14–9 (8–3)	Resch Center (2,760); Green Bay, WI
02/04/2017; 12:00 pm, ESPN3		Valparaiso	W 86–69	15–9 (9–3)	Resch Center (3,963); Green Bay, WI
02/09/2017; 6:30 pm, ESPN3		at Northern Kentucky	L 67–69	15–10 (9–4)	BB&T Arena (3,416); Highland Heights, KY
02/11/2017; 6:00 pm, ESPN3		at Wright State	L 79–88	15–11 (9–5)	Nutter Center (6,675); Dayton, OH
02/18/2017; 1:00 pm, ESPN3		at Milwaukee	W 80–56	16–11 (10–5)	UW–Milwaukee Panther Arena (2,626); Milwaukee, WI
02/21/2017; 7:00 pm, ESPN3		at UIC	W 87–79	17–11 (11–5)	UIC Pavilion (3,583); Chicago, IL
02/24/2017; 6:00 pm, ESPNU		Oakland	L 72–85	17–12 (11–6)	Resch Center; Green Bay, WI
02/26/2017; 2:00 pm, ASN/ESPN3		Detroit	W 89–81	18–12 (12–6)	Resch Center (3.718); Green Bay, WI
Horizon League tournament
03/05/2017; 5:00 pm, ESPN3	(3)	vs. (6) UIC; Quarterfinals	L 70–79	18–13	Joe Louis Arena (5,654); Detroit, MI
CBI
03/15/2017*; 7:05 pm		at UMKC; First Round	L 82–92	18–14	Municipal Auditorium (1,128); Kansas City, MO
*Non-conference game. ^{#}Rankings from AP Poll. (#) Tournament seedings in parentheses. All times are in Central Time.
