= Dantez Walton =

American basketball player

Free agent
- Position: Small forward

Personal information
- Born: December 28, 1997 (age 28)
- Listed height: 6 ft 6 in (1.98 m)
- Listed weight: 215 lb (98 kg)

Career information
- High school: Lima Central Catholic (Lima, Ohio)
- College: Northern Kentucky (2016–2020)
- NBA draft: 2020: undrafted
- Playing career: 2020–present

Career history
- 2020–2021: Kataja BC
- 2021–2022: BK JIP Pardubice

Career highlights
- Third-team All-Horizon League (2020)

Dantez Walton (born December 28, 1997) is an American professional basketball player. He played college basketball for Northern Kentucky.

== Early life ==
Walton attended Lima Central Catholic High School. Alongside future Northern Kentucky teammate Tre Cobbs, Walton led Lima Central Catholic to two state titles in three years. As a junior, he averaged 15.8 points and 8.4 rebounds per game. He was named Division III Co-Player of the Year as a senior. Walton averaged 18.5 points and 9 rebounds per game during his senior year. He signed with Northern Kentucky in November 2015, choosing the Norse over offers from Toledo and Robert Morris.

== College career ==
As a freshman at Northern Kentucky, Walton averaged 3.9 points and 2.3 rebounds per game. Walton served as the team's sixth man for much of his sophomore season before replacing Carson Williams in the starting lineup. Walton averaged 5.3 points and 3.4 rebounds per game. During the 2019 NCAA Tournament, Walton scored 11 points and had seven rebounds in the Round of 64 loss to Texas Tech. He averaged 11.1 points, 5.5 rebounds and 2.8 assists per game as a junior. On November 23, 2019, he scored a career-high 33 points and pulled down 10 rebounds in a 98–96 double-overtime loss to Texas Southern. Walton was named Horizon League player of the week in three consecutive weeks. Walton suffered a shoulder injury on December 15, against Illinois State, and did not make his return until January 31, versus Green Bay. As a senior, he averaged 16.1 points, 7.3 rebounds, 1.9 assists, and 1.4 steals per game, shooting 36 percent from beyond the arc. He was named to the Third Team All-Horizon League. Walton also earned Horizon League Winter Scholar-Athlete of the Season and All-Academic Team honors. During his senior season, the Norse finished 23–9 and won the conference tournament, qualifying for the NCAA Tournament. Walton finished his college career with 1,008 points and 522 rebounds.

== Professional career ==
On September 4, 2020, Walton signed his first professional contract with Kataja BC of the Korisliiga. He averaged 12.3 points, 5.1 rebounds, 3.0 assists, and 1.6 steals per game. On August 17, 2021, Walton signed with BK JIP Pardubice of the Czech National Basketball League.

On October 24, 2022, Walton joined the Sioux Falls Skyforce training camp roster. However, he did not make the final roster.
