= 2015–16 Milwaukee Panthers men's basketball team =

American college basketball season

2015–16 Milwaukee Panthers men's basketball

Cable Car Classic champions
- Conference: Horizon League
- Record: 20–13 (10–8 Horizon League)
- Head coach: Rob Jeter (11th season)
- Assistant coaches: Chad Boudreau (12th season); Sharif Chambliss (4th season); Chris Hill (1st season)
- Home arena: UW–Milwaukee Panther Arena; Klotsche Center

2015–16 Horizon League men's basketball standings
	Conf.				Overall
Team	W		L	PCT	W		L	PCT
Valparaiso	16	–	2	.889	30	–	7	.811
Oakland	13	–	5	.722	23	–	12	.657
Wright State	13	–	5	.722	22	–	13	.629
Green Bay †	11	–	7	.611	23	–	13	.639
Milwaukee	10	–	8	.556	20	–	13	.606
Detroit	9	–	9	.500	16	–	15	.516
Youngstown State	6	–	12	.333	11	–	21	.344
Northern Kentucky*	5	–	13	.278	9	–	21	.300
Cleveland State	4	–	14	.222	9	–	23	.281
UIC	3	–	15	.167	5	–	25	.167
† 2016 Horizon League Tournament winner * Ineligible for NCAA postseason during transition to Division I.

The 2015–16 Milwaukee Panthers men's basketball team represented the University of Wisconsin–Milwaukee during the 2015–16 NCAA Division I men's basketball season. The Panthers, led by 11th-year head coach Rob Jeter, played their home games at the UW–Milwaukee Panther Arena and the Klotsche Center, both in Milwaukee, Wisconsin, and were members of the Horizon League. They finished the season 20–13, 10–8 in Horizon League play, to finish in fifth place. They defeated Northern Kentucky in the first round of the Horizon League tournament to advance to the second round where they lost to Green Bay. Despite having 20 wins, they did not participate in a postseason tournament.

On March 17, head coach Rob Jeter was fired. He finished at Milwaukee with an 11-year record of 185–170.

== Roster ==
2015–16 Milwaukee Panthers men's basketball team
Players
Coaches

Pos.	#	Name	Height	Weight	Year	Hometown
G	1	Jordan Johnson	5 ft 9 in (1.75 m)	175 lb (79 kg)	RS Jr	Waukegan, IL
G	2	Akeem Springs	6 ft 4 in (1.93 m)	210 lb (95 kg)	Jr	Waukegan, IL
G	3	Brock Stull	6 ft 4 in (1.93 m)	180 lb (82 kg)	RS Fr	Caledonia, IL
G	4	Jeremy Johnson	6 ft 3 in (1.91 m)	175 lb (79 kg)	Fr	Brooklyn Park, MN
G	5	Cody Wichmann	6 ft 5 in (1.96 m)	210 lb (95 kg)	Jr	Pulaski, WI
G	11	JayQuan McCloud	6 ft 2 in (1.88 m)	175 lb (79 kg)	Fr	Waukegan, IL
G	15	Baylor Peterson	6 ft 2 in (1.88 m)	180 lb (82 kg)	Fr	Edina, MN
G	20	Derek Rongstad	6 ft 5 in (1.96 m)	178 lb (81 kg)	RS Fr	Middleton, WI
F	21	Dan Studer	6 ft 7 in (2.01 m)	230 lb (104 kg)	RS Jr	Germantown, WI
F	23	J.J. Panoske	6 ft 10 in (2.08 m)	225 lb (102 kg)	Sr	Brodhead, WI
G	30	J.R. Lyle	6 ft 2 in (1.88 m)	175 lb (79 kg)	Sr	Kansas City, MO
F	31	Matt Tiby	6 ft 8 in (2.03 m)	230 lb (104 kg)	Sr	Urbandale, IA
F	33	Scotty Tyler	6 ft 7 in (2.01 m)	205 lb (93 kg)	So	Grafton, WI
F	34	Austin Arians	6 ft 6 in (1.98 m)	200 lb (91 kg)	RS Jr	Stoughton, WI
F	50	Brett Prahl	6 ft 9 in (2.06 m)	225 lb (102 kg)	RS So	East Troy, WI
F	52	Alex Prahl	6 ft 9 in (2.06 m)	225 lb (102 kg)	RS So	East Troy, WI

Head coach

- Rob Jeter (UW–Platteville)

Assistant coach(es)

- Chad Boudreau (Hannibal–LaGrange)
- Sharif Chambliss (Wisconsin)
- Chris Hill (Milwaukee)

Legend

- (C) Team captain
- (S) Suspended
- (I) Ineligible
- (W) Walk-on
- Injured
- Current redshirt

Roster
Last update: February 25, 2025

== Schedule ==
- All conference games aired on the Horizon League website.

Date time, TV	Rank^{#}	Opponent^{#}	Result	Record	Site (attendance) city, state
Exhibition
November 5, 2015*; 7:00 p.m.		UW–Parkside	W 81–62		Klotsche Center; Milwaukee, WI
Non-conference regular season
November 13, 2015*; 6:30 p.m.		vs. Denver; Cable Car Classic	W 71–58	1–0	Leavey Center (1,552); Santa Clara, CA
November 14, 2015*; 7:30 p.m.		vs. Lipscomb; Cable Car Classic	W 71–65	2–0	Leavey Center (1,150); Santa Clara, CA
November 15, 2015*; 4:30 p.m.		vs. Santa Clara; Cable Car Classic	W 71–65	3–0	Leavey Center (1,314); Santa Clara, CA
November 17, 2015*; 6:00 p.m., ESPN3		at No. 18 Notre Dame	L 78–86	3–1	Edmund P. Joyce Center (7,464); Notre Dame, IN
November 20, 2015*; 7:00 p.m., ESPN3		Trinity International; Gulf Coast Showcase	W 85–61	4–1	UW–Milwaukee Panther Arena (1,724); Milwaukee, WI
November 23, 2015*; 11:00 a.m.		vs. Murray State; Gulf Coast Showcase quarterfinals	L 63–66	4–2	Germain Arena (523); Estero, FL
November 24, 2015*; 11:00 a.m.		vs. Duquesne; Gulf Coast Showcase consolation round	L 92–96 ^{OT}	4–3	Germain Arena (823); Estero, FL
November 25, 2015*; 11:00 a.m.		vs. Central Michigan; Gulf Coast Showcase 7th-place game	W 84–78	5–3	Germain Arena (1,077); Estero, FL
December 3, 2015*; 6:00 p.m., ESPN3		SIU Edwardsville	W 64–51	6–3	UW–Milwaukee Panther Arena (2,028); Milwaukee, WI
December 9, 2015*; 8:00 p.m., BTN		at Wisconsin	W 68–67	7–3	Kohl Center (17,287); Madison, WI
December 13, 2015*; 12:00 p.m.		Judson	W 125–74	8–3	Klotsche Center (1,813); Milwaukee, WI
December 17, 2015*; 7:00 p.m., TWCS		South Dakota	L 91–92 ^{2OT}	8–4	UW–Milwaukee Panther Arena (2,034); Milwaukee, WI
December 23, 2015*; 7:00 p.m., ESPN3		at Minnesota	W 74–65	9–4	Williams Arena (10,364); Minneapolis, MN
Horizon League regular season
January 2, 2016; 3:00 p.m., TWCS		Wright State	L 82–84 ^{OT}	9–5 (0–1)	UW–Milwaukee Panther Arena (2,803); Milwaukee, WI
January 4, 2016; 7:00 p.m., TWCS		Northern Kentucky	W 76–67	10–5 (1–1)	UW–Milwaukee Panther Arena (1,813); Milwaukee, WI
January 7, 2016; 6:45 p.m., ESPN3		at Youngstown State	W 81–65	11–5 (2–1)	Beeghly Center (1,644); Youngstown, OH
January 9, 2016; 2:00 p.m., TWCS		at Cleveland State	W 65–62	12–5 (3–1)	Wolstein Center (1,805); Cleveland, OH
January 14, 2016; 7:00 p.m.		at Valparaiso	L 56–68	12–6 (3–2)	Athletics–Recreation Center (2,619); Valparaiso, IN
January 16, 2016; 3:00 p.m., CSN Chicago		at UIC	W 87–62	13–6 (4–2)	UIC Pavilion (2,989); Chicago, IL
January 23, 2016; 3:00 p.m., TWCS		Detroit	W 83–80	14–6 (5–2)	UW–Milwaukee Panther Arena (3,107); Milwaukee, WI
January 25, 2016; 8:00 p.m., ASN		Oakland	L 79–82	14–7 (5–3)	UW–Milwaukee Panther Arena (2,821); Milwaukee, WI
January 29, 2016; 7:00 p.m., TWCS		Green Bay	W 95–94	15–7 (6–3)	UW–Milwaukee Panther Arena (5,192); Milwaukee, WI
February 4, 2016; 6:00 p.m., TWCS		at Wright State	L 83–84	15–8 (6–4)	Nutter Center (4,164); Fairborn, OH
February 6, 2016; 6:00 p.m., ESPN3		at Northern Kentucky	L 71–75	15–9 (6–5)	BB&T Arena (4,084); Highland Heights, KY
February 11, 2016; 6:00 p.m., ESPN3		at Oakland	W 93–85	16–9 (7–5)	Athletics Center O'rena (3,589); Rochester, MI
February 13, 2016; 2:00 p.m., ESPN3		at Detroit	L 66–80	16–10 (7–6)	Calihan Hall (3,259); Detroit, MI
February 15, 2016; 8:00 pm, ESPNU/ESPN3		at Green Bay	L 68–70	16–11 (7–7)	Resch Center (3,685); Green Bay, WI
February 20, 2016; 7:00 p.m., ESPN3		Cleveland State	W 88–54	17–11 (8–7)	UW–Milwaukee Panther Arena (2,689); Milwaukee, WI
February 22, 2016; 7:00 p.m.		Youngstown State	W 87–51	18–11 (9–7)	UW–Milwaukee Panther Arena (1,688); Milwaukee, WI
February 26, 2016; 6:00 p.m., ESPN2		Valparaiso	L 76–80	18–12 (9–8)	UW–Milwaukee Panther Arena (4,137); Milwaukee, WI
February 28, 2016; 2:00 p.m., ASN		UIC	W 98–85	19–12 (10–8)	UW–Milwaukee Panther Arena (2,828); Milwaukee, WI
Horizon League tournament
March 5, 2016; 1:30 p.m., ESPN3	(5)	vs. (8) Northern Kentucky; First round	W 86–69	20–12	Joe Louis Arena (5,247); Detroit, MI
March 6, 2016; 12:00 p.m., ESPN3	(5)	vs. (4) Green Bay; Second round	L 61–70	20–13	Joe Louis Arena (4,792); Detroit, MI
*Non-conference game. ^{#}Rankings from AP poll. (#) Tournament seedings in parentheses. All times are in Central.
