= 2015–16 Youngstown State Penguins men's basketball team =

American college basketball season

2015–16 Youngstown State Penguins men's basketball
- Conference: Horizon League
- Record: 11–21 (6–12 Horizon)
- Head coach: Jerry Slocum (11th season)
- Assistant coaches: Michael Wernicki; Stew Robinson
- Home arena: Beeghly Center

2015–16 Horizon League men's basketball standings
	Conf.				Overall
Team	W		L	PCT	W		L	PCT
Valparaiso	16	–	2	.889	30	–	7	.811
Oakland	13	–	5	.722	23	–	12	.657
Wright State	13	–	5	.722	22	–	13	.629
Green Bay †	11	–	7	.611	23	–	13	.639
Milwaukee	10	–	8	.556	20	–	13	.606
Detroit	9	–	9	.500	16	–	15	.516
Youngstown State	6	–	12	.333	11	–	21	.344
Northern Kentucky*	5	–	13	.278	9	–	21	.300
Cleveland State	4	–	14	.222	9	–	23	.281
UIC	3	–	15	.167	5	–	25	.167
† 2016 Horizon League Tournament winner * Ineligible for NCAA postseason during transition to Division I.

The 2015–16 Youngstown State Penguins men's basketball team represented Youngstown State University during the 2015–16 NCAA Division I men's basketball season. The Penguins, led by eleventh-year head coach Jerry Slocum, played their home games at the Beeghly Center in Youngstown, Ohio and were members of the Horizon League. They finished the season 11–21, 6–12 in Horizon League play, to finish in seventh place. They lost to Detroit in the first round of the Horizon League tournament.

== Previous season ==
The Penguins finished the 2014–15 season 11–21, 2–14 in Horizon League play, to finish in ninth place. They lost to Detroit in the first round of the Horizon League tournament. After the 2014–15 season, guard Marcus Keene transferred to Central Michigan.

== Roster ==
2015–16 Youngstown State Penguins men's basketball team
Players
Coaches

Pos.	#	Name	Height	Weight	Year	Previous school	Hometown
F	0	Matt Donlan	6 ft 7 in (2.01 m)	190 lb (86 kg)	RS Jr	Iowa Western CC	Melbourne, Australia
F	2	Devin Haygood	6 ft 7 in (2.01 m)	175 lb (79 kg)	Fr	Lincoln	Ypsilanti, MI
F	5	Sidney Umude	6 ft 7 in (2.01 m)	205 lb (93 kg)	So	St. Thomas Aquinas	San Antonio, TX
G	10	Ryan Strollo	6 ft 2 in (1.88 m)	190 lb (86 kg)	So	Ursuline	Youngstown, OH
G	11	Latin Davis	5 ft 11 in (1.8 m)	165 lb (75 kg)	Fr	Milan	Ypsilanti, MI
G	14	Tyler Warford	6 ft 1 in (1.85 m)	170 lb (77 kg)	So	Howard CC	Pittsburgh, PA
G	15	Brett Frantz	6 ft 3 in (1.91 m)	185 lb (84 kg)	Jr	Neosho County CC	Lawrence, KS
F	20	Bobby Hain	6 ft 10 in (2.08 m)	240 lb (109 kg)	Sr	Jupiter	Jupiter, FL
G	23	Francisco Santiago	6 ft 1 in (1.85 m)	160 lb (73 kg)	So	Wheeling Jesuit University	Cleveland, OH
G	24	Cameron Morse	6 ft 2 in (1.88 m)	180 lb (82 kg)	So	Carman-Ainsworth	Flint, MI
F	25	Jordan Andrews	6 ft 5 in (1.96 m)	180 lb (82 kg)	Fr	Riverside Academy	LaPlace, LA
C	32	Jordan Kaufman	7 ft 0 in (2.13 m)	250 lb (113 kg)	Jr	Oral Roberts University	Andover, KS
F	33	Bryce Nickels	6 ft 9 in (2.06 m)	200 lb (91 kg)	Fr	Sickles	Tampa, FL

Head coach

- Jerry Slocum (Kings (NY))

Assistant coach(es)

- Michael Wernicki (Pittsburgh)
- Stew Robinson (Indiana)

Legend

- (C) Team captain
- (S) Suspended
- (I) Ineligible
- (W) Walk-on
- Injured
- Current redshirt

Roster
Last update: July 8, 2024

== Schedule ==
Date time, TV	Rank^{#}	Opponent^{#}	Result	Record	Site (attendance) city, state
Non-conference regular season
November 14, 2015*; 7:00 p.m.		at Kent State; Coaches vs. Cancer Tip-Off	L 70–79	0–1	MAC Center (5,471); Kent, OH
November 18, 2015*; 7:00 p.m.		Toledo	L 78–100	0–2	Beeghly Center (1,723); Youngstown, OH
November 21, 2015*; 7:00 p.m., ESPN3		at Florida Gulf Coast; FGCU Classic	L 101–104 ^{3OT}	0–3	Alico Arena (3,562); Fort Myers, FL
November 22, 2015*; 4:00 p.m.		vs. Bowling Green; FGCU Classic	L 72–79	0–4	Alico Arena (3,412); Fort Myers, FL
November 23, 2015*; 4:00 p.m.		vs. North Dakota; FGCU Classic	W 79–69	1–4	Alico Arena (3,854); Fort Myers, FL
November 25, 2015*; 7:00 p.m.		Thiel	W 69–55	2–4	Beeghly Center (1,234); Youngstown, OH
November 28, 2015*; 3:00 p.m.		at Niagara	W 88–70	3–4	Gallagher Center (883); Lewiston, NY
December 2, 2015*; 7:00 p.m., ESPN3		Robert Morris	W 65–58	4–4	Beeghly Center (1,497); Youngstown, OH
December 4, 2015*; 7:00 p.m., ESPN3		American	L 56–60	4–5	Beeghly Center (1,296); Youngstown, OH
December 12, 2015*; 2:00 p.m., ESPN3		at No. 11 Purdue	L 64–95	4–6	Mackey Arena (14,026); West Lafayette, IN
December 15, 2015*; 7:00 p.m., ESPN3		Geneva	W 99–58	5–6	Beeghly Center (1,196); Youngstown, OH
December 19, 2015*; 6:00 p.m., ESPN3		at Michigan	L 46–105	5–7	Crisler Center (10,752); Ann Arbor, MI
December 21, 2015*; 7:00 p.m., ESPN3		at Notre Dame	L 78–87	5–8	Edmund P. Joyce Center (7,313); South Bend, IN
Horizon League regular season
January 2, 2016; 3:00 p.m., ESPN3		at Detroit	L 87–96	5–9 (0–1)	Calihan Hall (1,655); Detroit, MI
January 4, 2016; 7:00 p.m., ESPN3		at Oakland	W 100–98	6–9 (1–1)	Athletics Center O'rena (2,202); Rochester, MI
January 7, 2016; 7:45 p.m., ESPN3		Milwaukee	L 65–81	6–10 (1–2)	Beeghly Center (1,644); Youngstown, OH
January 9, 2016; 7:00 p.m., ESPN3		Green Bay	W 103–93	7–10 (2–2)	Beeghly Center (2,760); Youngstown, OH
January 14, 2016; 7:00 p.m., ESPN3		at Northern Kentucky	L 64–84	7–11 (2–3)	BB&T Arena (1,866); Highland Heights, KY
January 16, 2016; 7:00 p.m.		at Wright State	L 45–81	7–12 (2–4)	Nutter Center (4,251); Fairborn, OH
January 18, 2016; 7:00 p.m., ESPN3		Valparaiso	L 65–96	7–13 (2–5)	Beeghly Center (1,703); Youngstown, OH
January 24, 2016; 1:00 p.m.		vs. Cleveland State	W 70–55	8–13 (3–5)	Quicken Loans Arena (2,633); Cleveland, OH
January 28, 2016; 8:00 p.m.		at UIC	W 82–78	9–13 (4–5)	UIC Pavilion (2,178); Chicago, IL
January 30, 2016; 8:00 p.m.		at Valparaiso	L 68–97	9–14 (4–6)	Athletics–Recreation Center (4,520); Valparaiso, IN
February 4, 2016; 7:45 p.m., ESPN3		Oakland	L 85–107	9–15 (4–7)	Beeghly Center (2,056); Youngstown, OH
February 6, 2016; 7:00 p.m., ESPN3		Detroit	L 92–94	9–16 (4–8)	Beeghly Center (3,516); Youngstown, OH
February 13, 2016; 7:00 p.m., ESPN3		Cleveland State	L 59–64	9–17 (4–9)	Beeghly Center (2,996); Youngstown, OH
February 16, 2016; 7:00 p.m., ESPN3		UIC	W 92–91 ^{2OT}	10–17 (5–9)	Beeghly Center (1,162); Youngstown, OH
February 20, 2016; 2:00 p.m., ESPN3		at Green Bay	L 90–107	10–18 (5–10)	Resch Center (3,530); Green Bay, WI
February 22, 2016; 8:00 p.m.		at Milwaukee	L 51–87	10–19 (5–11)	UW–Milwaukee Panther Arena (1,688); Milwaukee, WI
February 25, 2016; 7:45 p.m., ESPN3		Wright State	L 81–87	10–20 (5–12)	Beeghly Center (2,063); Youngstown, OH
February 27, 2016; 7:00 p.m., ESPN3		Northern Kentucky	W 94–75	11–20 (6–12)	Beeghly Center (3,349); Youngstown, OH
Horizon League tournament
March 5, 2016; 7:30 p.m., ESPN3	(7)	vs. (6) Detroit; First round	L 79–92	11–21	Joe Louis Arena (5,247); Detroit, MI
*Non-conference game. ^{#}Rankings from AP poll. (#) Tournament seedings in parentheses. All times are in Eastern.
