= Vegas 16 =

College basketball tournament

- Vegas 16 logo
- Sport: College basketball
- Founded: 2016
- Founder: bd Global
- First season: 2015–16
- Folded: After 2016 tournament
- No. of teams: 8
- Country: United States
- Venues: Mandalay Bay Events Center, Paradise, Nevada
- Last champion: Old Dominion
- Most titles: Old Dominion (1)
- Broadcaster: CBSSN
- Website: http://www.vegas16.com/

The Vegas 16 tournament was a postseason men's college basketball tournament. The tournament was managed by Lexington, Kentucky-based sports marketing firm bd Global. CBS Sports Network was announced as the television partner for the quarterfinal, semifinal, and final rounds. Former UNLV and Arizona athletic director Jim Livengood was the chair of the tournament. Debbie Antonelli, John Balistere, Brooks Downing and George Raveling were on the selection committee. The field and seedings were announced after the NCAA and NIT tournament fields were revealed. The tournament featured eight teams not selected for either the NCAA or NIT tournaments. The lone offering took place March 28–30, 2016, at Mandalay Bay, in Paradise, Nevada.

== Concept ==
The Vegas 16 was inspired by college bowl games, in which the destination was considered as much of a draw as the game itself. In contrast to other unofficial postseason tournaments such as the College Basketball Invitational and CollegeInsider.com Tournament (in which the home arenas of higher-ranked teams hosted most of the games), all games in the Vegas 16 were intended to be held in a single location (Las Vegas, Nevada).

The Vegas 16 struggled to gain attention and fill its bracket throughout its existence. A number of high-major schools instituted policies automatically declining invitations to all postseason tournaments other than the NCAA and NIT; the tournament's timing (two weeks after the NCAA and NIT fields were set) also worked against it. Unwilling to fill its field with subpar teams, the Vegas 16, contrary to its name, only filled eight slots in its field in its 2016 tournament and opted not to hold a 2017 tournament at all.

== Television ==
The following is an overview and list of the announcers and television networks to broadcast the Vegas 16 Tournament Championship.

Year	Network	Play-by-Play	Analyst	Sideline
2016	CBSSN	Dave Ryan	Jordan Cornette	Debbie Antonelli

== Champions ==
Year	Champion	Runner-up	Most Valuable Player
2016	Old Dominion	Oakland	Trey Freeman, Old Dominion

== 2016 ==
The inaugural tournament planned on having sixteen teams; however, due to many teams forgoing participating in post-season tournaments, only eight teams were selected.

The following eight teams participated in the inaugural (and as events would prove, only) tournament:

- UC Santa Barbara
- East Tennessee State
- Louisiana Tech
- Northern Illinois
- Oakland
- Old Dominion
- Tennessee Tech
- Towson

== 2017 ==
It was announced on March 9, 2017, that the Vegas 16 tournament would not be held that year.
