= 2015–16 Cleveland State Vikings men's basketball team =

American college basketball season

2015–16 Cleveland State Vikings men's basketball
- Conference: Horizon League
- Record: 9–23 (4–14 Horizon)
- Head coach: Gary Waters (10th season)
- Assistant coaches: Larry DeSimpelare; Jermaine Kimbrough; Cornelius Jackson
- Home arena: Wolstein Center; Quicken Loans Arena

2015–16 Horizon League men's basketball standings
| | Conf. | | | | Overall |
| Team | W | | L | PCT | W | | L | PCT |
|---|---|---|---|---|---|---|---|---|
| Valparaiso | 16 | – | 2 | .889 | 30 | – | 7 | .811 |
| Oakland | 13 | – | 5 | .722 | 23 | – | 12 | .657 |
| Wright State | 13 | – | 5 | .722 | 22 | – | 13 | .629 |
| Green Bay † | 11 | – | 7 | .611 | 23 | – | 13 | .639 |
| Milwaukee | 10 | – | 8 | .556 | 20 | – | 13 | .606 |
| Detroit | 9 | – | 9 | .500 | 16 | – | 15 | .516 |
| Youngstown State | 6 | – | 12 | .333 | 11 | – | 21 | .344 |
| Northern Kentucky* | 5 | – | 13 | .278 | 9 | – | 21 | .300 |
| Cleveland State | 4 | – | 14 | .222 | 9 | – | 23 | .281 |
| UIC | 3 | – | 15 | .167 | 5 | – | 25 | .167 |
† 2016 Horizon League Tournament winner * Ineligible for NCAA postseason during transition to Division I.

The 2015–16 Cleveland State Vikings men's basketball team represented Cleveland State University in the 2015–16 NCAA Division I men's basketball season. Their head coach was Gary Waters in his tenth season. The Vikings were members of the Horizon League and played their home games at the Wolstein Center with five home games at Quicken Loans Arena. It was the 85th season of Cleveland State basketball. They finished the season 9–23, 4–14 in Horizon League play to finish in ninth place. They lost in the first round of the Horizon League tournament to Green Bay.

== Roster ==
2015–16 Cleveland State Vikings men's basketball team
Players
Coaches

| Pos. | # | Name | Height | Weight | Year | Hometown |
|---|---|---|---|---|---|---|
| F | 0 | Derek Sloan | 6 ft 5 in (1.96 m) | 225 lb (102 kg) | RS So | Moreland Hills, OH |
| G | 1 | Andre Yates | 6 ft 2 in (1.88 m) | 185 lb (84 kg) | Jr | Dayton, OH |
| G | 2 | Myles Hamilton | 6 ft 1 in (1.85 m) | 190 lb (86 kg) | RS Jr | Cleveland, OH |
| G | 3 | Rob Edwards | 6 ft 4 in (1.93 m) | 200 lb (91 kg) | Fr | Detroit, MI |
| G | 4 | Kenny Carpenter | 6 ft 4 in (1.93 m) | 180 lb (82 kg) | So | Detroit, MI |
| F | 5 | Jibri Blount | 6 ft 9 in (2.06 m) | 215 lb (98 kg) | Fr | Mountain Creek, Australia |
| G | 11 | Terrell Hales | 6 ft 4 in (1.93 m) | 185 lb (84 kg) | So | Detroit, MI |
| F | 13 | Jonathan Janssen | 6 ft 9 in (2.06 m) | 215 lb (98 kg) | Fr | Mountain Creek, Queensland, AUS |
| G | 20 | Bobby Word | 6 ft 4 in (1.93 m) | 175 lb (79 kg) | Jr | Lancaster, TX |
| G | 21 | Tim Hasbargen | 6 ft 4 in (1.93 m) | 200 lb (91 kg) | So | Munich, Germany |
| G | 23 | Khyler Fields | 6 ft 2 in (1.88 m) | 175 lb (79 kg) | Sr | Massillon, OH |
| G | 31 | Nelson Maxwell | 6 ft 0 in (1.83 m) | 170 lb (77 kg) | Fr | Orange Village, OH |
| C | 32 | Aaron Scales | 6 ft 9 in (2.06 m) | 260 lb (118 kg) | RS Jr | High Point, NC |
| F | 33 | Demonte Flannigan | 6 ft 7 in (2.01 m) | 240 lb (109 kg) | Jr | Richmond Heights, OH |
| F | 34 | Jeron Rogers | 6 ft 7 in (2.01 m) | 220 lb (100 kg) | Fr | North Farmington, MI |
| F | 41 | Vinny Zollo | 6 ft 8 in (2.03 m) | 230 lb (104 kg) | Sr | Greenfield, OH |
| G | 44 | Daniel Levitt | 6 ft 1 in (1.85 m) | 170 lb (77 kg) | Fr | Montreal, Quebec, CAN |

Head coach

- Gary Waters (Ferris State)

Assistant coach(es)

- Larry DeSimpelare (Spring Arbor)
- Jermaine Kimbrough (Virginia Tech)
- Cornelius Jackson (Marshall)

Legend

- (C) Team captain
- (S) Suspended
- (I) Ineligible
- (W) Walk-on
- Injured
- Current redshirt

Roster
Last update: 2015–12–05

== Schedule ==
| Date time, TV | Opponent | Result | Record | Site (attendance) city, state |
Non-Conference regular season
| 11/14/2015*; 9:30 pm | vs. Akron; Coaches vs. Cancer Tip-Off | L 53–65 | 0–1 | MAC Center (5,471); Kent, OH |
| 11/17/2015*; 7:00 pm | Malone | W 62–46 | 1–1 | Wolstein Center (1,331); Cleveland, OH |
| 11/21/2015*; 7:30 pm | at Rhode Island; Cancún Challenge | L 45–73 | 1–2 | Ryan Center (4,721); Kingston, RI |
| 11/24/2015*; 12:30 pm | vs. Rider; Cancún Challenge | W 57–52 | 2–2 | Hard Rock Hotel Riviera Maya (982); Cancún, MX |
| 11/25/2015*; 3:00 pm | vs. South Dakota State; Cancún Challenge | L 66–77 | 2–3 | Hard Rock Hotel Riviera Maya (982); Cancún, MX |
| 11/28/2015*; 3:00 pm, BTN | at Maryland; Cancún Challenge | L 63–80 | 2–4 | Xfinity Center (17,282); College Park, MD |
| 12/02/2015*; 3:00 pm | at Toledo | L 65–76 | 2–5 | Savage Arena (4,014); Toledo, OH |
| 12/05/2015*; 3:30 pm | vs. Kent State | L 62–66 | 2–6 | Quicken Loans Arena (3,671); Cleveland, OH |
| 12/12/2015*; 1:00 pm, ESPN3 | vs. Ohio | L 67–76 | 2–7 | Quicken Loans Arena (3,261); Cleveland, OH |
| 12/16/2015*; 8:00 pm, ESPN3 | at Loyola–Chicago | W 60–54 | 3–7 | Joseph J. Gentile Arena (1,189); Chicago, IL |
| 12/19/2015*; 1:00 pm, ESPN3 | Belmont | W 67–65 | 4–7 | Wolstein Center; Cleveland, OH |
| 12/23/2015*; 1:00 pm, ESPN3 | Bowling Green | L 47–62 | 4–8 | Wolstein Center (1,725); Cleveland, OH |
| 12/29/2015*; 7:00 pm, ESPN3 | Cedarville | W 77–37 | 5–8 | Wolstein Center (1,107); Cleveland, OH |
Horizon League regular season
| 01/02/2016; 3:00 pm, ESPN3 | at Oakland | L 68–86 | 5–9 (0–1) | Athletics Center O'rena (2,508); Rochester, MI |
| 01/04/2016; 7:30 pm, ESPN3 | at Detroit | L 80–88 | 5–10 (0–2) | Calihan Hall (1,539); Detroit, MI |
| 01/07/2016; 7:30 pm | Green Bay | L 67–87 | 5–11 (0–3) | Wolstein Center (1,471); Cleveland, OH |
| 01/09/2016; 3:00 pm | Milwaukee | L 62–65 | 5–12 (0–4) | Wolstein Center (1,805); Cleveland, OH |
| 01/14/2016; 7:00 pm | at Wright State | L 53–70 | 5–13 (0–5) | Nutter Center (3,937); Fairborn, OH |
| 01/16/2016; 7:00 pm | at Northern Kentucky | W 70–65 | 6–13 (1–5) | BB&T Arena (2,615); Highland Heights, KY |
| 01/18/2016; 7:00 pm | UIC | W 70–53 | 7–13 (2–5) | Wolstein Center (1,129); Cleveland, OH |
| 01/24/2016; 1:00 pm | vs. Youngstown State | L 55–70 | 7–14 (2–6) | Quicken Loans Arena (2,633); Cleveland, OH |
| 01/28/2016; 8:00 pm | at Valparaiso | L 52–77 | 7–15 (2–7) | Athletics–Recreation Center (2,313); Valparaiso, IN |
| 01/30/2016; 4:00 pm | at UIC | L 70–72 ^{OT} | 7–16 (2–8) | UIC Pavilion (2,980); Chicago, IL |
| 02/04/2016; 7:30 pm | Detroit | L 63–71 | 7–17 (2–9) | Wolstein Center (1,577); Cleveland, OH |
| 02/06/2016; 1:00 pm | Oakland | L 57–67 | 7–18 (2–10) | Wolstein Center (2,475); Cleveland, OH |
| 02/13/2016; 7:00 pm, ESPN3 | at Youngstown State | W 64–59 | 8–18 (3–10) | Beeghly Center (2,9996); Youngstown, OH |
| 02/16/2016; 7:00 pm | vs. Valparaiso | L 43–66 | 8–19 (3–11) | Quicken Loans Arena (1,545); Cleveland, OH |
| 02/20/2016; 4:00 pm, ESPN3 | at Milwaukee | L 54–88 | 8–20 (3–12) | UW–Milwaukee Panther Arena (2,689); Milwaukee, WI |
| 02/22/2016; 8:00 pm | at Green Bay | L 61–78 | 8–21 (3–13) | Resch Center (2,664); Green Bay, WI |
| 02/25/2016; 7:30 pm | Northern Kentucky | W 63–58 | 9–21 (4–13) | Wolstein Center (1,333); Cleveland, OH |
| 02/27/2016; 1:00 pm | vs. Wright State | L 51–55 | 9–22 (4–14) | Quicken Loans Arena (2,337); Cleveland, OH |
Horizon League tournament
| 03/05/2016; 12:00 pm, ESPN3 | vs. Green Bay; First round | L 53–65 | 9–23 | Joe Louis Arena (5,247); Detroit, MI |
*Non-conference game. ^{#}Rankings from ESPN/USA Today Coaches Poll. (#) Tournament seedings in parentheses. All times are in Eastern Time.
