= 2015–16 Wright State Raiders men's basketball team =

American college basketball season

2015–16 Wright State Raiders men's basketball
- Conference: Horizon League
- Record: 22–13 (13–5 Horizon)
- Head coach: Billy Donlon (6th season)
- Assistant coaches: Scott Woods; Patrice Days; Kevin Devitt
- Home arena: Nutter Center

2015–16 Horizon League men's basketball standings
	Conf.				Overall
Team	W		L	PCT	W		L	PCT
Valparaiso	16	–	2	.889	30	–	7	.811
Oakland	13	–	5	.722	23	–	12	.657
Wright State	13	–	5	.722	22	–	13	.629
Green Bay †	11	–	7	.611	23	–	13	.639
Milwaukee	10	–	8	.556	20	–	13	.606
Detroit	9	–	9	.500	16	–	15	.516
Youngstown State	6	–	12	.333	11	–	21	.344
Northern Kentucky*	5	–	13	.278	9	–	21	.300
Cleveland State	4	–	14	.222	9	–	23	.281
UIC	3	–	15	.167	5	–	25	.167
† 2016 Horizon League Tournament winner * Ineligible for NCAA postseason during transition to Division I.

The 2015–16 Wright State Raiders men's basketball team represented Wright State University during the 2015–16 NCAA Division I men's basketball season. The Raiders, led by sixth year head coach Billy Donlon, played their home games at the Nutter Center and were members of the Horizon League. They finished the season 22–13, 13–5 in Horizon League play to finish in a tie for second place. They defeated UIC, Detroit, and Oakland to advance to the championship game of the Horizon League tournament where they lost to Green Bay. Despite having 22 wins, they did not participate in a postseason tournament.

On March 19, head coach Billy Donlon was fired. He finished at Wright State with a six-year record of 109–94.

== Roster ==
2015–16 Wright State Raiders men's basketball team
Players
Coaches

Pos.	#	Name	Height	Weight	Year	Previous school	Hometown
F	0	Steven Davis	6 ft 7 in (2.01 m)	220 lb (100 kg)	RS Jr	Manual	Indianapolis, Indiana
G	2	Daniel Collie	6 ft 0 in (1.83 m)	170 lb (77 kg)	Sr	Parkersburg Catholic	Parkersburg, West Virginia
G	3	Mark Hughes	6 ft 4 in (1.93 m)	180 lb (82 kg)	Fr	Ursuline	Youngstown, Ohio
G	4	Alan Vest	6 ft 3 in (1.91 m)	185 lb (84 kg)	Fr	Chaminade-Julienne	Kettering, Ohio
G	5	Justin Mitchell (injured)	6 ft 3 in (1.91 m)	185 lb (84 kg)	So	Wayne	Fort Wayne, Indiana
G	10	Biggie Minnis (injured)	6 ft 3 in (1.91 m)	200 lb (91 kg)	Sr	University of Rhode Island	Philadelphia, Pennsylvania
F	11	JT Yoho	6 ft 6 in (1.98 m)	235 lb (107 kg)	Sr	Eastern Greene	Solsberry, Indiana
G	13	Grant Benzinger	6 ft 3 in (1.91 m)	190 lb (86 kg)	So	Moeller	Cincinnati, Ohio
C	14	Michael Karena	6 ft 10 in (2.08 m)	270 lb (122 kg)	Sr	South Plains CC	Christchurch, New Zealand
G	15	Brandon Neel	6 ft 3 in (1.91 m)	190 lb (86 kg)	Jr	La Salle	Cincinnati, Ohio
F	20	Daniel Mortensen (injured)	6 ft 9 in (2.06 m)	230 lb (104 kg)	Fr	Horsholm 79ers	Islev, Denmark
G	21	Trey Stacey	6 ft 4 in (1.93 m)	200 lb (91 kg)	So	Moeller	Cincinnati, Ohio
F	22	Parker Ernsthausen	6 ft 11 in (2.11 m)	225 lb (102 kg)	Fr	Toledo St. John's	Bowling Green, Ohio
G	23	Mark Alstork	6 ft 5 in (1.96 m)	190 lb (86 kg)	So	Ball State University	Dayton, Ohio
G	32	Joe Thomasson	6 ft 4 in (1.93 m)	165 lb (75 kg)	Sr	State Fair	Dayton, Ohio
F	35	Roderick Davis	6 ft 9 in (2.06 m)	230 lb (104 kg)	So	Brandon	Brandon, Florida

Head coach

- Billy Donlon (UNC Wilmington)

Assistant coach(es)

- Scott Woods (Rose–Hulman)
- Patrice Days (New Orleans)
- Kevin Devitt (DePaul)

Legend

- (C) Team captain
- (S) Suspended
- (I) Ineligible
- (W) Walk-on
- Injured
- Current redshirt

Roster
Last update: 23 December 2015

== Schedule ==
Date time, TV	Rank^{#}	Opponent^{#}	Result	Record	Site (attendance) city, state
Non-Conference regular season
11/13/2015*; 5:30 pm		vs. Belmont; NIU Showcase	W 77–69	1–0	Convocation Center (995); DeKalb, IL
11/14/2015*; 7:00 pm		vs. Cal State Northridge; NIU Showcase	L 67–72	1–1	Convocation Center (913); DeKalb, IL
11/15/2015*; 4:30 pm		at Northern Illinois; NIU Showcase	L 59–65	1–2	Convocation Center (888); DeKalb, IL
11/20/2015*; 8:00 pm, SECN		at Kentucky	L 63–78	1–3	Rupp Arena (22,563); Lexington, KY
11/24/2015*; 7:00 pm		Mount St. Joseph; NIU Showcase	W 66–52	2–3	Nutter Center (3,393); Fairborn, OH
11/28/2015*; 4:00 pm		at George Mason	L 39–66	2–4	Patriot Center (3,124); Fairfax, Virginia
12/01/2015*; 7:00 pm		Albion	W 68–50	3–4	Nutter Center (3,175); Fairborn, OH
12/04/2015*; 7:30 pm, ESPN3		Georgia State	L 46–50	3–5	Nutter Center (5,148); Fairborn, OH
12/08/2015*; 7:00 pm, FS1		at No. 12 Xavier	L 55–90	3–6	Cintas Center (10,178); Cincinnati, OH
12/13/2015*; 1:30 pm, ESPN3		at Miami (OH)	L 67–72	3–7	Millett Hall (1,397); Oxford, OH
12/17/2015*; 7:00 pm, ESPN3		Charleston Southern	W 71–65	4–7	Nutter Center (3,225); Fairborn, OH
12/20/2015*; 4:30 pm, TWCSC		Bowling Green	W 83–47	5–7	Nutter Center (3,772); Fairborn, OH
Horizon League regular season
12/22/2015*; 7:00 pm, ESPN3		Murray State	W 65–49	6–7	Nutter Center (3,708); Fairborn, OH
01/02/2016; 4:00 pm, TWCSC		at Milwaukee	W 84–82	7–7 (1–0)	UW–Milwaukee Panther Arena (2,802); Milwaukee, WI
01/04/2016; 8:00 pm, ESPN3		at Green Bay	L 68–76	7–8 (1–1)	Resch Center (2,357); Green Bay, WI
01/09/2016; 1:00 pm, ESPN3		at Northern Kentucky	W 60–46	8–8 (2–1)	BB&T Arena (2,804); Highland Heights, KY
01/14/2016; 7:00 pm, TWCSC/ESPN3		Cleveland State	W 70–53	9–8 (3–1)	Nutter Center (3,937); Fairborn, OH
01/16/2016; 7:00 pm, ESPN3		Youngstown State	W 81–45	10–8 (4–1)	Nutter Center (4,251); Fairborn, OH
01/18/2016; 7:00 pm, ASN		Detroit	W 77–76	11–8 (5–1)	Nutter Center (3,733); Fairborn, OH
01/22/2016; 7:00 pm, ESPN3		Valparaiso	W 73–62	12–8 (6–1)	Nutter Center (5,499); Fairborn, OH
01/24/2016; 2:00 pm		UIC	W 80–66	13–8 (7–1)	Nutter Center (4,437); Fairborn, OH
01/29/2016; 8:00 pm, ESPN3		at Oakland	L 63–89	13–9 (7–2)	Athletics Center O'rena (3,901); Rochester, MI
01/31/2016; 1:00 pm, ESPN3		at Detroit	L 68–75	13–10 (7–3)	Calihan Hall (2,011); Detroit, MI
02/04/2016; 7:00 pm, TWCSC		Milwaukee	W 84–83	14–10 (8–3)	Nutter Center (4,164); Fairborn, OH
02/06/2016; 7:00 pm, TWCSC		Green Bay	W 79–60	15–10 (9–3)	Nutter Center (4,218); Fairborn, OH
02/11/2016; 8:00 pm		at UIC	L 59–64	15–11 (9–4)	UIC Pavilion (2,633); Chicago, IL
02/13/2016; 8:00 pm		at Valparaiso	W 61–59	16–11 (10–4)	Athletics–Recreation Center (4,987); Valparaiso, IN
02/15/2016; 5:00 pm		Oakland	L 73–89	16–12 (10–5)	Nutter Center (4,846); Fairborn, OH
02/20/2016; 7:00 pm, TWCSC		Northern Kentucky	W 67–64	17–12 (11–5)	Nutter Center (7,825); Fairborn, OH
02/25/2016; 7:45 pm, ESPN3		at Youngstown State	W 87–81	18–12 (12–5)	Beeghly Center (2,063); Youngstown, OH
02/27/2016; 1:00 pm		vs. Cleveland State	W 55–51	19–12 (13–5)	Quicken Loans Arena (2,337); Cleveland, OH
Horizon League tournament
03/05/2016; 5:00 pm, ESPN3	(3)	vs. (10) UIC; First round	W 74–43	20–12	Joe Louis Arena (5,247); Detroit, MI
03/06/2016; 3:30 pm, ESPN3	(3)	vs. (6) Detroit; Second round	W 82–72	21–12	Joe Louis Arena (4,792); Detroit, MI
03/07/2016; 9:30 pm, ESPNU	(3)	vs. (2) Oakland; Semifinals	W 59–55	22–12	Joe Louis Arena (6,557); Detroit, MI
03/08/2016; 7:00 pm, ESPN	(3)	vs. (4) Green Bay; Championship game	L 69–78	22–13	Joe Louis Arena (4,312); Detroit, MI
*Non-conference game. ^{#}Rankings from AP Poll. (#) Tournament seedings in parentheses. All times are in Eastern Time.

== Awards and honors ==
Joe Thomasson	Horizon League All Defensive Team
JT Yoho	Horizon League All Tournament Team

== Statistics ==
Number	Name	Games	Average	Points	Assists	Rebounds
23	Mark Alstork	35	12.4	434	61	164
11	JT Yoho	34	12.6	427	83	168
14	Michael Karena	34	9.9	338	11	127
32	Joe Thomasson	35	9.6	337	117	185
13	Grant Benzinger	34	7.6	259	18	63
10	Biggie Minnis	29	7.0	204	94	85
3	Mark Hughes	33	3.5	116	41	63
5	Justin Mitchell	23	3.2	73	27	53
20	Daniel Mortensen	22	2.7	60	5	17
4	Alan Vest	22	1.5	32	8	15
36	Roderick Davis	12	1.5	18	2	9
21	Trey Stacey	13	1.3	17	2	5
02	Daniel Collie	17	0.9	15	6	2
15	Brandon Neel	5	3.0	3	1	7
