= 2015–16 Valparaiso Crusaders men's basketball team =

American college basketball season

2015–16 Valparaiso Crusaders men's basketball

Horizon League regular season champions

NIT, Runner-Up
- Conference: Horizon League
- Record: 30–7 (16–2 Horizon)
- Head coach: Bryce Drew (5th season)
- Assistant coaches: Roger Powell; Luke Gore; Matt Lottich
- Home arena: Athletics–Recreation Center

2015–16 Horizon League men's basketball standings
	Conf.				Overall
Team	W		L	PCT	W		L	PCT
Valparaiso	16	–	2	.889	30	–	7	.811
Oakland	13	–	5	.722	23	–	12	.657
Wright State	13	–	5	.722	22	–	13	.629
Green Bay †	11	–	7	.611	23	–	13	.639
Milwaukee	10	–	8	.556	20	–	13	.606
Detroit	9	–	9	.500	16	–	15	.516
Youngstown State	6	–	12	.333	11	–	21	.344
Northern Kentucky*	5	–	13	.278	9	–	21	.300
Cleveland State	4	–	14	.222	9	–	23	.281
UIC	3	–	15	.167	5	–	25	.167
† 2016 Horizon League Tournament winner * Ineligible for NCAA postseason during transition to Division I.

The 2015–16 Valparaiso Crusaders men's basketball team represented Valparaiso University during the 2015–16 NCAA Division I men's basketball season. The Crusaders, led by fifth year head coach Bryce Drew, played their home games at the Athletics–Recreation Center and were members of the Horizon League. They finished the season 30–7, 16–2 in Horizon League play to win the regular season championship. They lost in the semifinals of the Horizon League tournament to Green Bay. As a regular season conference champion who failed to win their conference tournament, received an automatic bid to the National Invitation Tournament. As one of the last four teams left out of the NCAA tournament, they received a #1 seed in the NIT where they defeated Texas Southern, Florida State, Saint Mary's, and BYU to advance to the championship game where they lost to George Washington.

This season was Bryce Drew's final season as Valparaiso head coach. He accepted the Vanderbilt head coaching job on April 5, 2016. He finished at Valpo with a five-year record of 124–49 and went to the postseason every year as head coach.

== Previous season ==
The Crusaders finished the 2014–15 season with an overall record of 28–6, and 13–3 to win the Horizon League regular season championship. They defeated Cleveland State and Green Bay to win the Horizon League tournament championship. They received an automatic bid to the NCAA tournament where they lost in the second round to Maryland.

== Pre-season ==
On July 31, 2015, the NCAA announced that senior Vashil Fernandez, the 2015 Horizon League Defensive Player of the Year, would be granted an additional year of eligibility. The Crusaders therefore returned 98.9 percent of their minutes from the previous season in which they won both the Horizon League regular season and tournament championships. All five starting players from 2014–15 returned to the 2015–16 team.

=== Departures ===
Name	Number	Pos.	Height	Weight	Year	Hometown	Notes
David Chadwick	12	F	6'9"	220	Senior	Charlotte, NC	Graduated

=== Class of 2015 signees ===
On October 7, 2014, Derrik Smits, son of former NBA Center Rik Smits, committed to Valparaiso.

College recruiting information
Name	Hometown	School	Height	Weight	Commit date
Derrik Smits; C	Zionsville, IN	Zionsville	7 ft 1 in (2.16 m)	235 lb (107 kg)	Oct 6, 2014
Derrik Smits; C	Recruit ratings: Scout: Rivals: 247Sports: (77)				
Overall recruit ranking:
Note: In many cases, Scout, Rivals, 247Sports, On3, and ESPN may conflict in their listings of height and weight.; In these cases, the average was taken. ESPN grades are on a 100-point scale.; Sources: "ESPN". ESPN.; "2015 Team Ranking". Rivals.

=== Class of 2016 signees ===
College recruiting information
Name	Hometown	School	Height	Weight	Commit date
Micah Bradford; PG	Bradley, Illinois	Bradley-Bourbonnais Community High School	6 ft 0 in (1.83 m)	150 lb (68 kg)	Nov 18, 2015
Micah Bradford; PG	Recruit ratings: Rivals:				
Overall recruit ranking:
Note: In many cases, Scout, Rivals, 247Sports, On3, and ESPN may conflict in their listings of height and weight.; In these cases, the average was taken. ESPN grades are on a 100-point scale.; Sources:

== Season results ==
The Crusaders won 16 games in Horizon League play and lost 2, both to Wright State. The Crusaders won the Horizon League regular season championship, three games ahead of second place Oakland.

After Valparaiso won the regular season Horizon League championship, a Fox Sports writer noted that the Crusaders' strengths were defense, rebounding, depth and experience, and that Valpo—"perhaps the best mid-major team in college basketball this year"—was still likely to be on the edge of the March Madness selection process. ESPN's Eamonn Brennan wrote that Valpo was "a really good team that was banged up in nonconference play and -- in the Watch's humble opinion -- probably deserves to be in the tournament at the end of the day."

In January 2016, ESPN selected coach Bryce Drew as one of its ten national Coach of the Year finalists. As of late February 2016, the Crusaders allowed opponents 0.87 points per possession, best of all Division I teams. Senior center Vashil Fernandez was again the league's Defensive Player of the Year, and junior forward Alec Peters was named again to the All League First Team. For the third time in five seasons, Bryce Drew was named the league's Coach of the Year. Vashil Fernandez earned the 2016 Lefty Driesell Award as the nation's top defensive player.

However, Valpo lost their first game of the Horizon League Tournament, losing to Green Bay in the semifinals. The Crusaders failed to receive an at-large bid to the NCAA tournament.

As the winners of the Horizon League regular season, the Crusaders received an automatic bid to the National Invitation Tournament. Valpo received a #1 seed and defeated Texas Southern, Florida State, and Saint Mary's to advance to the NIT Final Four at Madison Square Garden. There, they defeated BYU to advance to the NIT Championship game versus George Washington. After a close first half, George Washington ran away with the game in the second half, defeating Valpo 76–60.

Following the season, head coach Bryce Drew accepted the head coaching position at Vanderbilt.

== Roster ==
2015–16 Valparaiso Crusaders men's basketball team
Players
Coaches

Pos.	#	Name	Height	Weight	Year	Hometown
G	0	Keith Carter	6 ft 1 in (1.85 m)	180 lb (82 kg)	Sr	Maywood, IL
G/F	1	E. Victor Nickerson	6 ft 8 in (2.03 m)	185 lb (84 kg)	Sr	Atlanta, GA
G	2	Tevonn Walker	6 ft 2 in (1.88 m)	200 lb (91 kg)	So	Montreal, Quebec, Canada
G	3	Max Joseph	6 ft 1 in (1.85 m)	210 lb (95 kg)	So	Montreal, Quebec, Canada
F	5	Darien Walker	6 ft 3 in (1.91 m)	220 lb (100 kg)	Sr	Chicago, IL
F	10	David Skara	6 ft 8 in (2.03 m)	205 lb (93 kg)	So	Zadar, Croatia
G	11	Shane Hammink	6 ft 7 in (2.01 m)	210 lb (95 kg)	RS Jr	Millingen aan de Rijn, Netherlands
F	14	Vashil Fernandez	6 ft 10 in (2.08 m)	260 lb (118 kg)	Sr	Kingston, Jamaica
G	15	Lexus Williams	6 ft 0 in (1.83 m)	160 lb (73 kg)	So	Chicago, IL
C	21	Derrik Smits (injured) (redshirt)	7 ft 1 in (2.16 m)	235 lb (107 kg)	Fr	Zionsville, IN
G	22	Nick Davidson	6 ft 4 in (1.93 m)	195 lb (88 kg)	Jr	Munster, IN
F	23	Jubril Adekoya	6 ft 7 in (2.01 m)	230 lb (104 kg)	Jr	Tinley Park, IL
F	25	Alec Peters	6 ft 9 in (2.06 m)	230 lb (104 kg)	Jr	Washington, IL
F	30	Chandler Levingston Simon	6 ft 7 in (2.01 m)	230 lb (104 kg)	So	Vernon Hills, IL

Head coach

- Bryce Drew (Valparaiso)

Assistant coach(es)

- Roger Powell, Jr. (Illinois)
- Luke Gore (Bethel (TN))
- Matt Lottich (Stanford)

Legend

- (C) Team captain
- (S) Suspended
- (I) Ineligible
- (W) Walk-on
- Injured
- Current redshirt

Roster
Last update: 2015–11–25

== Schedule ==
The 2015–2016 Valparaiso University men's basketball schedule is:

Date time, TV	Rank^{#}	Opponent^{#}	Result	Record	Site (attendance) city, state
Exhibition
11/03/2015*; 7:00 pm		Indianapolis	W 75–67	–	Athletics–Recreation Center (2,488); Valparaiso, IN
Regular season
11/13/2015*; 7:30 pm, ESPN3		IPFW	W 78–64	1–0	Athletics–Recreation Center (4,117); Valparaiso, IN
11/15/2015*; 7:00 pm, ESPN3		Iona; Beaver Showcase	W 83–58	2–0	Athletics–Recreation Center (2,769); Valparaiso, IN
11/17/2015*; 9:00 am, ESPN2		at Rhode Island	W 58–55	3–0	Ryan Center (4,881); Kingston, RI
11/18/2015*; 7:00 pm, ESPN3		IU-Kokomo; Beaver Showcase	W 78–40	4–0	Athletics–Recreation Center (1,340); Valparaiso, IN
11/19/2015*; 7:00 pm, ESPN3		Trinity Christian; Beaver Showcase	W 89–42	5–0	Athletics–Recreation Center (1,422); Valparaiso, IN
11/22/2015*; 5:00 pm, P12N		at No. 25 Oregon	L 67–73	5–1	Matthew Knight Arena (5,752); Eugene, OR
11/24/2015*; 8:00 pm, P12N		at Oregon State; Beaver Showcase	W 63–57	6–1	Gill Coliseum (5,235); Corvallis, OR
11/28/2015*; 1:00 pm		at Ball State	L 66–69	6–2	Worthen Arena (2,447); Muncie, IN
12/03/2015*; 7:00 pm		Belmont	W 61–57	7–2	Athletics–Recreation Center (3,379); Valparaiso, IN
12/09/2015*; 6:00 pm, ESPN3		at Indiana State	W 69–63	8–2	Hulman Center (3,621); Terre Haute, IN
12/11/2015*; 7:05 pm		at Chicago State	W 71–53	9–2	Jones Convocation Center (1,733); Chicago, IL
12/19/2015*; 1:30 pm		Missouri State	W 74–45	10–2	Athletics–Recreation Center (3,458); Valparaiso, IN
12/28/2015*; 7:00 pm		at Belmont	L 81–85	10–3	Curb Event Center (3,024); Nashville, TN
Horizon League regular season
01/02/2016; 1:05 pm, ASN		UIC	W 75–47	11–3 (1–0)	Athletics–Recreation Center (3,773); Valparaiso, IN
01/08/2016; 6:00 pm, ESPN2		at Oakland	W 84–67	12–3 (2–0)	Athletics Center O'rena (4,110); Rochester, MI
01/10/2016; 12:00 pm, ASN		at Detroit	W 92–74	13–3 (3–0)	Calihan Hall (1,513); Detroit, MI
01/14/2016; 7:02 pm		Milwaukee	W 68–56	14–3 (4–0)	Athletics–Recreation Center (2,619); Valparaiso, IN
01/16/2016; 7:02 pm		Green Bay	W 85–70	15–3 (5–0)	Athletics–Recreation Center (4,939); Valparaiso, IN
01/18/2016; 6:05 pm, ESPN3		at Youngstown State	W 96–65	16–3 (6–0)	Beeghly Center (1,703); Youngstown, OH
01/22/2016; 6:00 pm, ESPN3		at Wright State	L 62–73	16–4 (6–1)	Nutter Center (5,499); Fairborn, OH
01/24/2016; 12:00 pm, ASN		at Northern Kentucky	W 71–46	17–4 (7–1)	BB&T Arena (2,079); Newport, KY
01/28/2016; 7:00 pm		Cleveland State	W 77–52	18–4 (8–1)	Athletics–Recreation Center (2,313); Valparaiso, IN
01/30/2016; 7:00 pm		Youngstown State	W 97–68	19–4 (9–1)	Athletics–Recreation Center (4,520); Valparaiso, IN
02/06/2016; 3:00 pm, CSN		at UIC	W 73–55	20–4 (10–1)	UIC Pavilion (4,445); Chicago, IL
02/11/2016; 7:02 pm		Northern Kentucky	W 64–52	21–4 (11–1)	Athletics–Recreation Center (2,312); Valparaiso, IN
02/13/2016; 7:02 pm		Wright State	L 59–61	21–5 (11–2)	Athletics–Recreation Center (4,987); Valparaiso, IN
02/16/2016; 6:00 pm		at Cleveland State	W 66–43	22–5 (12–2)	Quicken Loans Arena (1,545); Cleveland, OH
02/19/2016; 7:05 pm, ESPNU		Oakland	W 86–84	23–5 (13–2)	Athletics–Recreation Center (4,863); Valparaiso, IN
02/21/2016; 1:32 pm		Detroit	W 90–74	24–5 (14–2)	Athletics–Recreation Center (4,151); Valparaiso, IN
02/26/2016; 6:02 pm, ESPN2		at Milwaukee	W 80–76 ^{OT}	25–5 (15–2)	UW–Milwaukee Panther Arena (4,137); Milwaukee, WI
02/28/2016; 2:00 pm, ESPN3		at Green Bay	W 70–68	26–5 (16–2)	Resch Center (4,491); Green Bay, WI
Horizon League tournament
03/07/2016; 6:00 pm, ESPNU	(1)	vs. (4) Green Bay; Semifinals	L 92–99 ^{OT}	26–6	Joe Louis Arena (6,557); Detroit, MI
NIT
03/15/2016*; 8:15 pm, ESPN3	(1)	(8) Texas Southern; First Round – Valparaiso Bracket	W 84–73	27–6	Athletics–Recreation Center (2,912); Valparaiso, IN
3/17/2016*; 6:00 pm, ESPNews	(1)	(4) Florida State; Second Round – Valparaiso Bracket	W 81–69	28–6	Athletics-Recreation Center (4,991); Valparaiso, IN
3/22/2016*; 6:00 pm, ESPN	(1)	(2) Saint Mary's; Quarterfinals – Valparaiso Bracket	W 60–44	29–6	Athletics-Recreation Center (5,444); Valparaiso, IN
3/29/2016*; 6:00 pm, ESPN	(1)	vs. (2) BYU; Semifinals	W 72–70	30–6	Madison Square Garden (8,298); New York, NY
3/31/2016*; 6:00 pm, ESPN	(1)	vs. (4) George Washington; Championship	L 60–76	30–7	Madison Square Garden (7,016); New York, NY
*Non-conference game. ^{#}Rankings from AP Poll. (#) Tournament seedings in parentheses. All times are in Central Time.
