= 2015–16 Detroit Titans men's basketball team =

American college basketball season

2015–16 Detroit Titans men's basketball
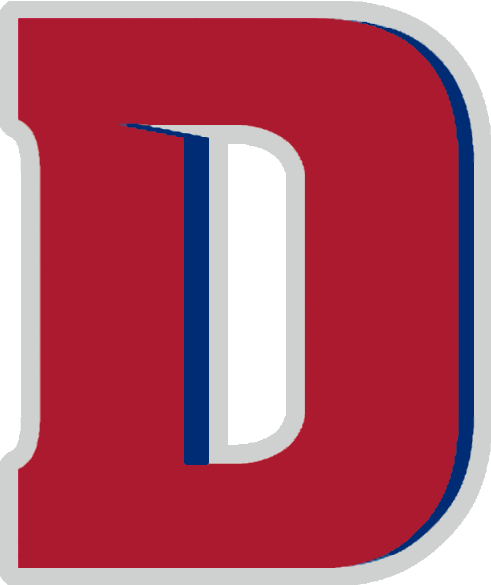
- Conference: Horizon League
- Record: 16–15 (9–9 Horizon)
- Head coach: Ray McCallum (8th season)
- Assistant coaches: Jay Smith; Steve Payne; Jermaine Jackson
- Home arena: Calihan Hall

2015–16 Horizon League men's basketball standings
	Conf.				Overall
Team	W		L	PCT	W		L	PCT
Valparaiso	16	–	2	.889	30	–	7	.811
Oakland	13	–	5	.722	23	–	12	.657
Wright State	13	–	5	.722	22	–	13	.629
Green Bay †	11	–	7	.611	23	–	13	.639
Milwaukee	10	–	8	.556	20	–	13	.606
Detroit	9	–	9	.500	16	–	15	.516
Youngstown State	6	–	12	.333	11	–	21	.344
Northern Kentucky*	5	–	13	.278	9	–	21	.300
Cleveland State	4	–	14	.222	9	–	23	.281
UIC	3	–	15	.167	5	–	25	.167
† 2016 Horizon League Tournament winner * Ineligible for NCAA postseason during transition to Division I.

The 2015–16 Detroit Titans men's basketball team represented the University of Detroit Mercy during the 2015–16 NCAA Division I men's basketball season. Their head coach was Ray McCallum in his eighth season. The Titans played their home games at Calihan Hall and were members of the Horizon League. They finished the season 16–15, 9–9 in Horizon League play to finish in sixth place. They defeated Youngstown State in the first round of the Horizon League tournament to advance to the second round where they lost to Wright State.

On April 1, head coach Ray McCallum was fired. He finished at Detroit with an eight-year record of 130–132.

== Roster ==
2015–16 Detroit Titans men's basketball team
Players
Coaches

Pos.	#	Name	Height	Weight	Year	Hometown
G/F	0	Chris Jenkins	6 ft 7 in (2.01 m)	190 lb (86 kg)	Jr	Detroit, MI
G	1	Anton Wilson	6 ft 5 in (1.96 m)	210 lb (95 kg)	Sr	Flint, MI
F	2	Jalen Gibson	6 ft 7 in (2.01 m)	213 lb (97 kg)	Fr	Detroit, MI
G	4	Carlton Brundidge	6 ft 2 in (1.88 m)	204 lb (93 kg)	RS Sr	Southfield, MI
PG	5	Matthew Grant	6 ft 0 in (1.83 m)	177 lb (80 kg)	Jr	Los Angeles, CA
PG	11	Jarod Williams	6 ft 1 in (1.85 m)	215 lb (98 kg)	Jr	Danville, VA
G	13	Patrick Robinson, Jr.	5 ft 11 in (1.8 m)	170 lb (77 kg)	Jr	Brampton, ON
F	15	Aaron Foster-Smith	6 ft 7 in (2.01 m)	220 lb (100 kg)	RS Fr	Taylor, MI
F	21	Jaleel Hogan	6 ft 6 in (1.98 m)	240 lb (109 kg)	So	Saginaw, MI
G	23	Josh McFolley	6 ft 0 in (1.83 m)	170 lb (77 kg)	Fr	Detroit, MI
F	25	Gerald Blackshear	6 ft 8 in (2.03 m)	215 lb (98 kg)	Fr	Detroit, MI
G/F	35	Paris Bass	6 ft 8 in (2.03 m)	200 lb (91 kg)	RS So	Birmingham, MI

Head coach

- Ray McCallum (Ball State)

Assistant coach(es)

- Jay Smith (Saginaw Valley State)
- Steve Payne (Ball State)
- Jermaine Jackson (Detroit Mercy)

Legend

- (C) Team captain
- (S) Suspended
- (I) Ineligible
- (W) Walk-on
- Injured
- Current redshirt

Roster
Last update: 2015–11–09

== Schedule ==
Date time, TV	Rank^{#}	Opponent^{#}	Result	Record	High points	High rebounds	High assists	Site (attendance) city, state
Regular season
Nov 16*; 7:00 pm, ESPN3		Central State	W 88–65	1–0	17 – McFolley	10 – Blackshear	5 – Brundidge	Calihan Hall (1,295); Detroit, MI
Nov 20*; 8:00 pm, ESPN3		at Pittsburgh	L 79–95	1–1	20 – Wilson	7 – Brundidge	4 – Brundidge	Petersen Events Center (7,819); Pittsburgh, PA
Nov 23*; 7:00 pm, ESPN3		UM–Dearborn	W 122–70	2–1	25 – Jenkins	9 – Gibson	9 – Brundidge	Calihan Hall (1,309); Detroit, MI
Nov 28*; 2:00 pm, ESPN3		at Oral Roberts	L 95–100	2–2	23 – Brundidge	13 – Jenkins	4 – Wilson	Mabee Center (2,914); Tulsa, OK
Dec 2*; 8:00 pm, SECN Plus		at No. 16 Vanderbilt	L 52–102	2–3	14 – Wilson	6 – Blackshear	2 – Williams	Memorial Gymnasium (9,958); Nashville, TN
Dec 5*; 3:00 pm, ESPN3		Northeastern	W 76–73	3–3	20 – McFolley	6 – Jenkins	3 – Tied	Calihan Hall (1,733); Detroit, MI
Dec 9*; 7:30 pm, ESPN3		Toledo	W 75–72	4–3	17 – Jenkins	11 – Jenkins	3 – 3 Tied	Calihan Hall (1,523); Detroit, MI
Dec 12*; 1:00 pm, ESPN3		Bowling Green	W 95–80	5–3	25 – Bass	10 – Hogan	4 – Williams	Calihan Hall (1,609); Detroit, MI
Dec 19*; 1:00 pm, ESPN3		Central Florida	W 95–89	6–3	26 – Jenkins	10 – Jenkins	3 – Hogan	Calihan Hall (2,055); Detroit, MI
Dec 22*; 8:00 pm		at Western Kentucky	L 74–79	6–4	15 – McFolley	8 – Jenkins	5 – Bass	E. A. Diddle Arena (3,031); Bowling Green, KY
Dec 28*; 7:00 pm, ESPN3		at Eastern Michigan	L 73–88	6–5	19 – McFolley	10 – Blackshear	4 – Bass	Convocation Center (1,415); Ypsilanti, MI
Horizon League regular season
Jan 2; 3:00 pm, ESPN3/WADL		Youngstown State	W 96–87	7–5 (1–0)	34 – Wilson	9 – Wilson	5 – Jenkins	Calihan Hall (1655); Detroit, MI
Jan 4; 7:30 pm, ESPN3		Cleveland State	W 88–80	8–5 (2–0)	28 – Bass	13 – Bass	6 – McFolley	Calihan Hall (1,539); Detroit, MI
Jan 8; 7/9:00 pm, ESPNU		UIC	W 87–69	9–5 (3–0)	17 – Bass	6 – Blackshear	3 – Brundidge	Calihan Hall (1,857); Detroit, MI
Jan 10; 1:05 pm, ASN/ESPN3		Valparaiso	L 74–92	9–6 (3–1)	23 – Wilson	10 – Bass	4 – Jenkins	Calihan Hall (1,513); Detroit, MI
Jan 16; 3:00 pm, ESPN3/WADL		Oakland	L 82–86	9–7 (3–2)	20 – Bass, Hogan	8 – Bass, Hogan	6 – Bass	Calihan Hall (6,125); Detroit, MI
Jan 18; 7:00 pm, ASN		at Wright State	L 76–77	9–8 (3–3)	28 – Bass	6 – Bass	4 – McFolley	Nutter Center (3,733); Dayton, OH
Jan 23; 4:00 pm, ESPN3		at Milwaukee	L 80–83	9–9 (3–4)	20 – Jenkins	8 – Bass	3 – Tied	UW–Milwaukee Panther Arena (3,107); Milwaukee, WI
Jan 25; 8:00 pm, ESPN3		at Green Bay	L 108–115 ^{OT}	9–10 (3–5)	25 – Jenkins	8 – Bass	3 – 3 Tied	Resch Center (2,469); Green Bay, WI
Jan 29; 7:00 pm, ESPN3/WADL		Northern Kentucky	L 83–91	9–11 (3–6)	17 – Hogan	7 – Hogan	3 – Tied	Calihan Hall (2,025); Detroit, MI
Jan 31; 1:00 pm, ESPN3/WADL		Wright State	W 75–68	10–11 (4–6)	18 – Wilson	5 – Jenkins	4 – McFolley	Calihan Hall (2,011); Detroit, MI
Feb 4; 7:30 pm, ESPN3		at Cleveland State	W 71–63	11–11 (5–6)	20 – Jenkins	17 – Bass	4 – McFolley	Wolstein Center (1,577); Cleveland, OH
Feb 6; 7:05 pm		at Youngstown State	W 94–92	12–11 (6–6)	20 – Bass	4 – Bass/Blackshear/Brundidge/Jenkins	5 – McFolley	Beeghly Center (3,516); Youngstown, OH
Feb 11; 7:30 pm, ESPN3/WADL		Green Bay	L 85–86	12–12 (6–7)	24 – Bass	13 – Bass	4 – Wilson	Calihan Hall (2,311); Detroit, MI
Feb 13; 3:00 pm, ESPN3/WADL		Milwaukee	W 80–66	13–12 (7–7)	24 – Bass	12 – Brundidge	3 – Bass/Williams/Wilson	Calihan Hall (3,259); Detroit, MI
Feb 16; 7:00 pm, ESPN3		at Northern Kentucky	W 74–68	14–12 (8–7)	24 – Bass	12 – Bass	5 – McFolley	BB&T Arena (2,357); Highland Heights, KY
Feb 19; 8:00 pm, ESPN3		at UIC	W 83–72	15–12 (9–7)	22 – Bass	11 – Bass	7 – Brudidge	UIC Pavilion; Chicago, IL
Feb 21; 2:30 pm, ESPN3		at Valparaiso	W 90–74	15–13 (9–8)	28 – Bass	7 – Bass	4 – Brundidge	Athletics–Recreation Center (4,151); Valparaiso, IN
Feb 26; 9:00 pm, ESPNU		at Oakland	L 97–108	15–14 (9–9)	22 – Jenkins	8 – Hogan	6 – Wilson	Athletics Center O'rena (4,114); Auburn Hills, MI
Horizon League tournament
Mar 5; 7:30 pm, ESPN3	(6)	vs. (7) Youngstown State; First round	W 92–79	16–14	28 – Brundidge	9 – Brundidge	4 – Wilson	Joe Louis Arena (5,247); Detroit, MI
Mar 6; 1:00 pm, ESPN3	(6)	vs. (3) Wright State; Second round	L 72–82	16–15	24 – Bass	13 – Bass	3 – Wilson	Joe Louis Arena (4,792); Detroit, MI
*Non-conference game. ^{#}Rankings from AP Poll. (#) Tournament seedings in parentheses. All times are in Eastern Time.
