= 2015–16 Green Bay Phoenix men's basketball team =

American college basketball season

2015–16 Green Bay Phoenix men's basketball

Horizon League tournament champions

NCAA tournament, First Round
- Conference: Horizon League
- Record: 23–13 (11–7 Horizon)
- Head coach: Linc Darner (1st season)
- Assistant coaches: Randall Herbst; Richard Davis; Ben Swank
- Home arena: Resch Center

2015–16 Horizon League men's basketball standings
	Conf.				Overall
Team	W		L	PCT	W		L	PCT
Valparaiso	16	–	2	.889	30	–	7	.811
Oakland	13	–	5	.722	23	–	12	.657
Wright State	13	–	5	.722	22	–	13	.629
Green Bay †	11	–	7	.611	23	–	13	.639
Milwaukee	10	–	8	.556	20	–	13	.606
Detroit	9	–	9	.500	16	–	15	.516
Youngstown State	6	–	12	.333	11	–	21	.344
Northern Kentucky*	5	–	13	.278	9	–	21	.300
Cleveland State	4	–	14	.222	9	–	23	.281
UIC	3	–	15	.167	5	–	25	.167
† 2016 Horizon League Tournament winner * Ineligible for NCAA postseason during transition to Division I.

The 2015–16 Green Bay Phoenix men's basketball team represented the University of Wisconsin–Green Bay in the 2015–16 NCAA Division I men's basketball season. Their head coach in his first year was Linc Darner. The Phoenix played their home games at the Resch Center and were members of the Horizon League. They finished the season 23–13, 11–7 in Horizon League play to finish in fourth place. They defeated Cleveland State, Milwaukee, Valparaiso, and Wright State to become champions of the Horizon League tournament. They received the conference's automatic bid to the NCAA tournament where they lost in the first round to Texas A&M.

== Roster ==
2015–16 Green Bay Phoenix men's basketball team
Players
Coaches

Pos.	#	Name	Height	Weight	Year	Hometown
F	1	Kerem Kanter	6 ft 9 in (2.06 m)	245 lb (111 kg)	So	Istanbul, Turkey
G	2	Turner Botz	6 ft 7 in (2.01 m)	215 lb (98 kg)	Jr	Little Chute, WI
G	3	Khalil Small	6 ft 2 in (1.88 m)	205 lb (93 kg)	So	Chicago, IL
G	4	Jordan Fouse	6 ft 7 in (2.01 m)	225 lb (102 kg)	Sr	Racine, WI
G	5	Avery Brown	6 ft 2 in (1.88 m)	165 lb (75 kg)	Fr	Clermont, FL
G	11	Anthony Brown	6 ft 1 in (1.85 m)	160 lb (73 kg)	Fr	Clermont, FL
G	12	Carrington Love	6 ft 1 in (1.85 m)	171 lb (78 kg)	Sr	Milwaukee, WI
G	23	Jamar Hurdle	6 ft 7 in (2.01 m)	200 lb (91 kg)	Jr	Milwaukee, WI
G	32	Tevin Findlay	6 ft 4 in (1.93 m)	190 lb (86 kg)	Jr	Malton, ON, Canada
F	34	Charles Cooper	6 ft 4 in (1.93 m)	220 lb (100 kg)	Jr	Gary, IN
F	45	Kenneth Lowe	6 ft 8 in (2.03 m)	230 lb (104 kg)	Jr	Little Chute, WI
F/C	50	Henry Uwadiae	6 ft 8 in (2.03 m)	230 lb (104 kg)	Jr	Benin City, Nigeria
F		David Jesperson	6 ft 8 in (2.03 m)	210 lb (95 kg)	Jr	Merrill, WI
G		Warren Jones	6 ft 3 in (1.91 m)	190 lb (86 kg)	Jr	Centralia, IL

Head coach

- Linc Darner (Purdue)

Assistant coach(es)

- Randall Herbst (Waldorf)
- Richard Davis (Ashland)
- Ben Swank (Edinboro)

Legend

- (C) Team captain
- (S) Suspended
- (I) Ineligible
- (W) Walk-on
- Injured
- Current redshirt

Roster
Last update: 2015–12–04

== Schedule ==
Date time, TV	Rank^{#}	Opponent^{#}	Result	Record	Site (attendance) city, state
Exhibition
10/31/2015*; 1:00 pm		UW–Stout	W 95–41		Resch Center; Green Bay, WI
Non-Conference regular season
11/13/2015*; 8:00 pm, P12N		at Stanford; NIT Season Tip-Off	L 89–93 ^{OT}	0–1	Maples Pavilion (3,783); Stanford, CA
11/17/2015*; 5:00 am, ESPN2		at East Tennessee State; NIT Season Tip-Off	L 90–103	0–2	Freedom Hall Civic Center (3,992); Johnson City, TN
11/19/2015*; 6:00 pm, ESPN3		at Georgia Tech; NIT Season Tip-Off	L 77–107	0–3	Hank McCamish Pavilion (4,252); Atlanta, GA
11/22/2015*; 12:00 pm, ESPN3		UM–Duluth	W 94–74	1–3	Resch Center (2,245); Green Bay, WI
11/24/2015*; 7:00 pm, TWCS/ESPN3		Akron; NIT Season Tip-Off	W 66–63	2–3	Resch Center (2,230); Green Bay, WI
11/28/2015*; 7:00 pm		at Eastern Illinois	W 81–72	3–3	Lantz Arena (410); Charleston, IL
11/30/2015*; 7:00 pm, FSMW		at SIU Edwardsville	W 87–69	4–3	Vadalabene Center (1,027); Edwardsville, IL
12/06/2015*; 2:00 pm, ESPN3		Toledo	L 69–71	4–4	Resch Center (2,864); Green Bay, WI
12/15/2015*; 7:00 pm, ESPN3		Pacific	W 93–88	5–4	Resch Center (2,283); Green Bay, WI
12/20/2015*; 12:00 pm, ESPN3		UW–Superior	W 108–57	6–4	Resch Center (2073); Green Bay, WI
12/23/2015*; 8:00 pm, BTN		at Wisconsin	L 79–84	6–5	Kohl Center (17,287); Madison, WI
12/28/2015*; 6:00 pm		at Morehead State	W 78–72	7–5	Ellis Johnson Arena (2,634); Morehead, KY
Horizon League regular season
01/02/2016; 1:00 pm, ESPN3		Northern Kentucky	W 86–70	8–5 (1–0)	Resch Center (3,560); Green Bay, WI
01/04/2016; 7:00 pm, ESPN3		Wright State	W 76–68	9–5 (2–0)	Resch Center (2,357); Green Bay, WI
01/07/2016; 6:30 pm, ESPN3		at Cleveland State	W 87–67	10–5 (3–0)	Wolstein Center (1,471); Cleveland, OH
01/09/2016; 6:00 pm, ESPN3		at Youngstown State	L 93–103	10–6 (3–1)	Beeghly Center (2,760); Youngstown, OH
01/14/2016; 7:00 pm, ESPN3		at UIC	W 78–76	11–6 (4–1)	UIC Pavilion (2,552); Chicago, IL
01/16/2016; 7:00 pm, ESPN3		at Valparaiso	L 70–85	11–7 (4–2)	Athletics–Recreation Center (4,939); Valparaiso, IN
01/19/2016*; 7:00 pm, WAC DN		at Chicago State	W 99–66	12–7	Jones Convocation Center (1,032); Chicago, IL
01/23/2016; 1:00 pm, ESPN3		Oakland	L 95–111	12–8 (4–3)	Resch Center (3,928); Green Bay, WI
01/25/2016; 7:00 pm, ESPN3		Detroit	W 115–108 ^{OT}	13–8 (5–3)	Resch Center (2,469); Green Bay, WI
01/29/2016; 7:00 pm, ESPN3		at Milwaukee	L 94–95	13–9 (5–4)	UW–Milwaukee Panther Arena (5,192); Milwaukee, WI
02/04/2016; 6:00 pm, ESPN3		at Northern Kentucky	W 85–78	14–9 (6–4)	BB&T Arena (2,171); Highland Heights, KY
02/06/2016; 6:00 pm, TWCS/ESPN3		at Wright State	L 60–79	14–10 (6–5)	Nutter Center (4,218); Fairborn, OH
02/11/2016; 6:30 pm, ESPN3		at Detroit	W 86–85	15–10 (7–5)	Calihan Hall (2,311); Detroit, MI
02/13/2016; 2:00 pm, ESPN3		at Oakland	L 93–111	15–11 (7–6)	Athletics Center O'rena (3,908); Rochester, MI
02/15/2016; 8:00 pm, ESPN3		Milwaukee	W 70–68	16–11 (8–6)	Resch Center (3,685); Green Bay, WI
02/20/2016; 1:00 pm, TWCS/ESPN3		Youngstown State	W 107–90	17–11 (9–6)	Resch Center (3,530); Green Bay, WI
02/22/2016; 7:00 pm, TWCS/ESPN3		Cleveland State	W 78–61	18–11 (10–6)	Resch Center (2,664); Green Bay, WI
02/26/2016; 7:00 pm, ESPN3		UIC	W 85–69	19–11 (11–6)	Resch Center (4,033); Green Bay, WI
02/28/2016; 2:00 pm, ESPN3		Valparaiso	L 68–70	19–12 (11–7)	Resch Center (4,491); Green Bay, WI
Horizon League tournament
03/05/2016; 11:00 am, ESPN3	(4)	vs. (9) Cleveland State; First Round	W 65–53	20–12	Joe Louis Arena (5,247); Detroit, MI
03/06/2016; 1:00 pm, ESPN3	(4)	vs. (5) Milwaukee; Second Round	W 70–61	21–12	Joe Louis Arena (4,792); Detroit, MI
03/07/2016; 7:00 pm, ESPNU	(4)	vs. (1) Valparaiso; Semifinals	W 99–92 ^{OT}	22–12	Joe Louis Arena (6,557); Detroit, MI
03/08/2016; 7:00 pm, ESPN	(4)	vs. (3) Wright State; Championship	W 78–69	23–12	Joe Louis Arena (4,312); Detroit, MI
NCAA tournament
03/18/2016*; 6:20 pm, TBS	(14 W)	vs. (3 W) No. 15 Texas A&M; First Round	L 65–92	23–13	Chesapeake Energy Arena (15,279); Oklahoma City, OK
*Non-conference game. ^{#}Rankings from AP Poll. (#) Tournament seedings in parentheses. W=West Region. All times are in Central Time.
