= 2015–16 UIC Flames men's basketball team =

American college basketball season

2015–16 UIC Flames men's basketball
- Conference: Horizon League
- Record: 5–25 (3–15 Horizon)
- Head coach: Steve McClain (1st season)
- Assistant coaches: Ron Coleman; Brendan Mullins; Deon Thomas
- Home arena: UIC Pavilion

2015–16 Horizon League men's basketball standings
	Conf.				Overall
Team	W		L	PCT	W		L	PCT
Valparaiso	16	–	2	.889	30	–	7	.811
Oakland	13	–	5	.722	23	–	12	.657
Wright State	13	–	5	.722	22	–	13	.629
Green Bay †	11	–	7	.611	23	–	13	.639
Milwaukee	10	–	8	.556	20	–	13	.606
Detroit	9	–	9	.500	16	–	15	.516
Youngstown State	6	–	12	.333	11	–	21	.344
Northern Kentucky*	5	–	13	.278	9	–	21	.300
Cleveland State	4	–	14	.222	9	–	23	.281
UIC	3	–	15	.167	5	–	25	.167
† 2016 Horizon League Tournament winner * Ineligible for NCAA postseason during transition to Division I.

The 2015–16 UIC Flames men's basketball team represented the University of Illinois at Chicago in the 2015–16 NCAA Division I men's basketball season. They were led by first-year head coach Steve McClain, hired in the offseason to replace Howard Moore. The Flames played their home games at the UIC Pavilion and were members of the Horizon League. They finished the season 5–25, 3–15 in Horizon League play to finish in last place. They lost in the first round of the Horizon League tournament to Wright State.

== Previous season ==
The Flames finished towards the bottom of the Horizon League standings with a record of 4–12 (10–24). Following a semifinal exit in the conference tournament, head coach Howard Moore was let go. He was replaced by Indiana assistant and former Wyoming head coach Steve McClain.

== Roster ==
2015–16 UIC Flames men's basketball team
Players
Coaches

Pos.	#	Name	Height	Weight	Year	Hometown
G	0	Dominique Matthews	6 ft 2 in (1.88 m)	190 lb (86 kg)	Fr	Chicago, IL
G	1	Paris Burns	5 ft 11 in (1.8 m)	165 lb (75 kg)	Sr	Chicago, IL
G	2	Gabe Snider	6 ft 3 in (1.91 m)	180 lb (82 kg)	Sr	Chicago, IL
F	3	Hassan Thomas	6 ft 7 in (2.01 m)	210 lb (95 kg)	Fr	Dallas, TX
G/F	4	Lance Whitaker	6 ft 4 in (1.93 m)	210 lb (95 kg)	RS So	Bartlett, IL
G	5	Michael Kolawole	6 ft 5 in (1.96 m)	195 lb (88 kg)	Fr	Rowlett, TX
F	10	Dikembe Dixson	6 ft 7 in (2.01 m)	200 lb (91 kg)	Fr	Freeport, IL
G	11	Josh Joiner	6 ft 1 in (1.85 m)	170 lb (77 kg)	Jr	Chicago, IL
F/C	15	Julian Torres	6 ft 9 in (2.06 m)	265 lb (120 kg)	Fr	Bolingbrook, IL
F/C	21	Tai Odiase	6 ft 9 in (2.06 m)	220 lb (100 kg)	So	Glenwood, IL
G	22	Drew Hackett	6 ft 2 in (1.88 m)	180 lb (82 kg)	Fr	Munster, IN
G/F	23	Najeal Young	6 ft 6 in (1.98 m)	225 lb (102 kg)	Jr	Milwaukee, WI
F	32	Hans-Christian Lauer	6 ft 7 in (2.01 m)	220 lb (100 kg)	Jr	Klein-Winternheim, Germany
G	34	Markese McGuire	6 ft 3 in (1.91 m)	190 lb (86 kg)	Jr	Elkhart, IN
F	40	Jake Wiegand	6 ft 8 in (2.03 m)	245 lb (111 kg)	Sr	Herndon, VA

Head coach

- Steve McClain (Chadron State)

Assistant coach(es)

- Ron Coleman (Lamar)
- Brendan Mullins (Saint Michael's)
- Deon Thomas (Illinois)

Legend

- (C) Team captain
- (S) Suspended
- (I) Ineligible
- (W) Walk-on
- Injured
- Current redshirt

Roster
Last update: 2015–11–06

== Schedule ==
Date time, TV	Opponent	Result	Record	High points	High rebounds	High assists	Site (attendance) city, state
Exhibition
Nov 7*; 3:00 pm, ESPN3	Lake Forest	W 73–60		17 – Matthews	11 – Odiase	2 – Five Tied	UIC Pavilion; Chicago, IL
Non-conference regular season
Nov 13*; 7:00 pm, ESPN3	San Francisco	L 75–78	0–1	13 – Dixson	9 – Wiegand	3 – Three Tied	UIC Pavilion (4,033); Chicago, IL
Nov 17*; 7:00 pm	at Western Illinois	L 57–84	0–2	16 – Odiase	8 – Odiase	2 – Burns	Western Hall (1,106); Macomb, IL
Nov 24*; 7:00 pm, ESPN3	Roosevelt	W 96–58	1–2	23 – Odiase	15 – Dixson	5 – McGuire, Whitaker	UIC Pavilion (2,939); Chicago, IL
Nov 28*; 7:00 pm, ESPN3	at Drake	L 62-83	1-3	13 – Dixson	6 – Dixson	1 – Five Tied	Knapp Center (2.593); Des Moines, IA
Dec 2*; 7:00 pm, CSN+	DePaul	L 55–82	1–4	17 – Matthews	6 – Young	4 – Burns	UIC Pavilion (4,417); Chicago, IL
Dec 5*; 6:00 pm, ESPN3	at Central Florida	L 58–88	1–5	22 – Dixson	8 – Dixson	3 – Hackett	CFE Arena (4,208); Orlando, FL
Dec 12*; 1:00 pm, BTN	vs. Illinois	L 79–83	1–6	20 – Dixson	10 – Dixson	6 – Burns	United Center (5,151); Chicago, IL
Dec 16*; 8:00 pm, CSN	Illinois State	L 60–72	1–7	20 – Matthews	10 – Dixson	4 – Three Tied	UIC Pavilion (4,499); Chicago, IL
Dec 19*; 3:00 pm, ESPN3	at Loyola Chicago	L 47–64	1–8	11 – Snider	6 – Dixson	3 – Whitaker	Gentile Arena (1,562); Chicago, IL
Dec 22*; 7:00 pm, ESPN3	Purdue-Calumet	W 91–74	2–8	18 – Snider	9 – Dixson	7 – Burns	UIC Pavilion (1,814); Chicago, IL
Dec 29*; 7:00 pm, ESPN3	Northern Illinois	L 65–70	2–9	28 – Dixson	6 – Whitaker	7 – Whitaker	UIC Pavilion (2,349); Chicago, IL
Horizon League regular season
Jan 2; 1:00 pm, CSN	at Valparaiso	L 47–75	2–10 (0–1)	8 – Whitaker	6 – Young	3 – Dixson, Whitaker	Athletics–Recreation Center (3,773); Valparaiso, IN
Jan 8; 8:00 pm, ESPNU	at Detroit	L 69–87	2–11 (0–2)	22 – Dixson	7 – Dixson, Young	2 – Whitaker	Calihan Hall (1,857); Detroit, MI
Jan 10; 2:00 pm, ESPN3	at Oakland	L 61–86	2–12 (0–3)	28 – Dixson	8 – Young	4 – Whitaker	Athletics Center O'rena (2,473); Rochester, MI
Jan 14; 7:00 pm, ESPN3	Green Bay	L 76–78	2–13 (0–4)	19 – Dixson	9 – Odiase	9 – Whitaker	UIC Pavilion (2,552); Chicago, IL
Jan 16; 3:00 pm, CSN+	Milwaukee	L 62–87	2–14 (0–5)	19 – Burns	7 – Dixson	3 – Whitaker	UIC Pavilion (2,989); Chicago, IL
Jan 18; 6:00 pm, ESPN3	at Cleveland State	L 53–70	2–15 (0–6)	15 – Dixson	11 – Odiase	2 – Dixson & Burns	Wolstein Center (1,129); Cleveland, OH
Jan 22; 6:00 pm, ESPN3	at Northern Kentucky	L 69–82 ^{OT}	2–16 (0–7)	24 – Dixson	10 – Dixson, Young	1 – Three Tied	The Bank of Kentucky Center (1,755); Highland Heights, KY
Jan 24; 1:00 pm, ESPN3	at Wright State	L 66–80	2–17 (0–8)	29 – Dixson	9 – Dixson	2 – Three Tied	Nutter Center (4,437); Dayton, OH
Jan 28; 7:00 pm, ESPN3	Youngstown State	L 78–82	2–18 (0–9)	32 – Dixson	16 – Young	5 – Kolawole	UIC Pavilion (2,178); Chicago, IL
Jan 30; 3:00 pm, CSN+	Cleveland State	W 72–70 ^{OT}	3–18 (1–9)	24 – Dixson	15 – Young	6 – Whitaker	UIC Pavilion (2,980); Chicago, IL
Feb 6; 3:00 pm, CSN	Valparaiso	L 55–73	3–19 (1–10)	18 – Dixson	7 – Dixson	5 – Whitaker	UIC Pavilion (4,445); Chicago, IL
Feb 11; 7:00 pm, ESPN3	Wright State	W 64–59	4–19 (2–10)	26 – Dixson	12 – Dixson	5 – Whitaker	UIC Pavilion (2,633); Chicago, IL
Feb 13; 3:00 pm, ESPN3	Northern Kentucky	W 79–77	5–19 (3–10)	21 – Dixson	10 – Young	4 – Young	UIC Pavilion (2,666); Chicago, IL
Feb 16; 6:05 pm, ESPN3	at Youngstown State	L 91–92 ^{2OT}	5–20 (3–11)	40 – Dixson	17 – Dixson	8 – Whitaker	Beeghly Center (1,162); Youngstown, OH
Feb 19; 7:00 pm, ESPN3	Detroit	L 72–83	5–21 (3–12)	26 – Dixson	10 – Odiase	5 – Kolawole	UIC Pavilion (4,110); Chicago, IL
Feb 21; 4:00 pm, CSN	Oakland	L 63–74	5–22 (3–13)	24 – Dixon	10 – Young	10 – Felder	UIC Pavilion (2,888); Chicago, IL
Feb 26; 7:00 pm, ESPN3	at Green Bay	L 69–85	5–23 (3–14)	22 – Dixson	12 – Odiase	2 – Three Tied	Resch Center (4,033); Green Bay, WI
Feb 28; 2:00 pm, CSN	at Milwaukee	L 85–98	5–24 (3–15)	29 – Dixson	8 – Young	5 – Dixson	UW–Milwaukee Panther Arena (2,828); Milwaukee, WI
Horizon League tournament
Mar 5; 4:00 pm, ESPN3	vs. Wright State; First round	L 43–74	5–25	18 – Dixson	11 – Dixson	1 – Five Tied	Joe Louis Arena (5,247); Detroit, MI
*Non-conference game. ^{#}Rankings from AP Poll. (#) Tournament seedings in parentheses. All times are in Central Time.
