= 2015–16 Northern Kentucky Norse men's basketball team =

American college basketball season

2015–16 Northern Kentucky Norse men's basketball
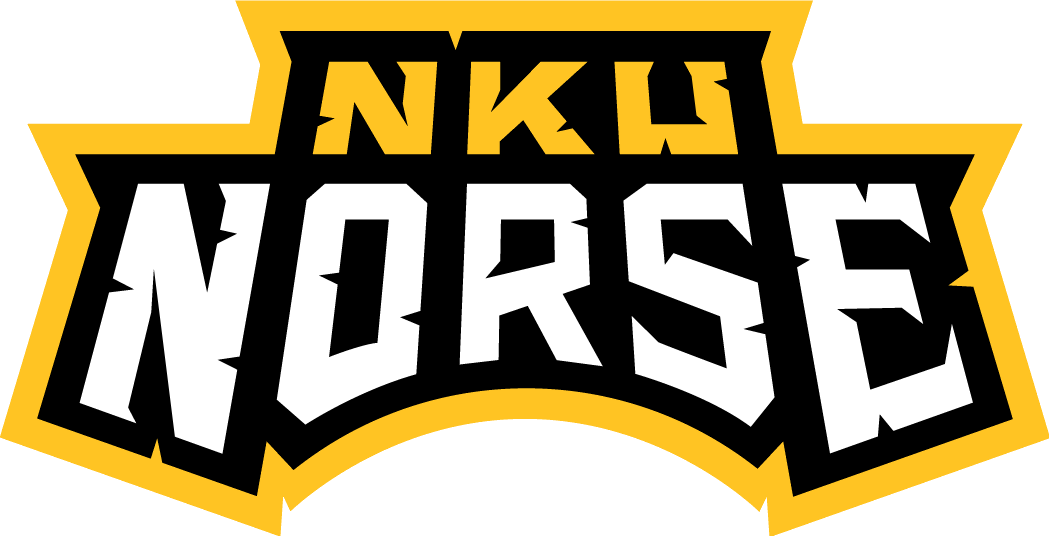
- Conference: Horizon League
- Record: 9–21 (5–13 Horizon)
- Head coach: John Brannen (1st season)
- Assistant coaches: David Ragland; Ronald Nored; Sean Dwyer
- Home arena: BB&T Arena

2015–16 Horizon League men's basketball standings
	Conf.				Overall
Team	W		L	PCT	W		L	PCT
Valparaiso	16	–	2	.889	30	–	7	.811
Oakland	13	–	5	.722	23	–	12	.657
Wright State	13	–	5	.722	22	–	13	.629
Green Bay †	11	–	7	.611	23	–	13	.639
Milwaukee	10	–	8	.556	20	–	13	.606
Detroit	9	–	9	.500	16	–	15	.516
Youngstown State	6	–	12	.333	11	–	21	.344
Northern Kentucky*	5	–	13	.278	9	–	21	.300
Cleveland State	4	–	14	.222	9	–	23	.281
UIC	3	–	15	.167	5	–	25	.167
† 2016 Horizon League Tournament winner * Ineligible for NCAA postseason during transition to Division I.

The 2015–16 Northern Kentucky Norse men's basketball team represented Northern Kentucky University (NKU) during the 2015–16 NCAA Division I men's basketball season. The Norse, led by first head coach John Brannen, played their home games at BB&T Arena and were first year members of the Horizon League. Due to their transition to Division I, the Norse were ineligible to participate in NCAA-operated postseason play, specifically the NCAA tournament and NIT, and will remain ineligible for those tournaments until the 2016–17 season. They finished the season 9–21, 5–13 in Horizon League play to finish in eighth place. They lost in the first round of the Horizon League tournament to Milwaukee.

== Roster ==
2015–16 Northern Kentucky Norse men's basketball team
Players
Coaches

Pos.	#	Name	Height	Weight	Year	Hometown
F	0	Jeff Garrett	6 ft 7 in (2.01 m)	215 lb (98 kg)	RS Fr	Gadsden, Alabama
F	1	Jordan Garnett	6 ft 6 in (1.98 m)	220 lb (100 kg)	So	Indianapolis, Indiana
G	3	Tyler White	6 ft 3 in (1.91 m)	185 lb (84 kg)	Sr	Lima, Ohio
F	4	Deontae Cole	6 ft 6 in (1.98 m)	210 lb (95 kg)	Jr	Toledo, Ohio
G	11	Lavone Holland II	6 ft 2 in (1.88 m)	180 lb (82 kg)	So	Louisville, Kentucky
F	13	Brennan Gillis	6 ft 6 in (1.98 m)	210 lb (95 kg)	Fr	Indianapolis, Indiana
F	20	Jake Giesler	6 ft 7 in (2.01 m)	235 lb (107 kg)	RS Sr	Fort Thomas, Kentucky
F/C	21	Jalen Billups	6 ft 6 in (1.98 m)	245 lb (111 kg)	RS Sr	Cincinnati, Ohio
G	22	Matt Rosenwinkel	6 ft 2 in (1.88 m)	225 lb (102 kg)	Jr	Rochelle, Illinois
G	23	Todd Johnson	5 ft 9 in (1.75 m)	175 lb (79 kg)	Sr	Elkhart, Indiana
G	25	Cole Murray	6 ft 7 in (2.01 m)	200 lb (91 kg)	Jr	Delphi, Indiana
F/C	32	Jared Bryant	6 ft 7 in (2.01 m)	255 lb (116 kg)	RS Sr	Cincinnati, Ohio
G	33	Skyler Kolli	5 ft 10 in (1.78 m)	150 lb (68 kg)	Fr	Indianapolis, Indiana
F/C	34	Drew McDonald	6 ft 8 in (2.03 m)	265 lb (120 kg)	Fr	Cold Spring, Kentucky
G	44	Dean Danos	5 ft 11 in (1.8 m)	175 lb (79 kg)	Jr	Oak Lawn, Illinois

Head coach

John Brannen (Marshall)

Assistant coach(es)

- David Ragland (Southern Indiana)
- Ronald Nored (Butler)
- Sean Dwyer (Michigan State)

Legend

- (C) Team captain
- (S) Suspended
- (I) Ineligible
- (W) Walk-on
- Injured
- Current redshirt

Roster
Last update: 12/4/15

== Schedule and results ==
Date time, TV	Opponent	Result	Record	Site (attendance) city, state
Exhibition
11/07/15*; 1:00 pm	Ohio Northern	W 81–76		BB&T Arena (1,384); Highland Heights, KY
Regular season
11/13/15*; 7:00 pm	at West Virginia	L 61–107	0–1	WVU Coliseum (10,120); Morgantown, WV
11/17/15*; 7:00 pm, ESPN3	Tiffin	W 83–71	1–1	BB&T Arena (1,794); Highland Heights, KY
11/21/15*; 7:00 pm, ESPN3	Morehead State	L 56–64	1–2	BB&T Arena (2,798); Highland Heights, KY
11/23/15*; 8:30 pm, FS1	at No. 23 Xavier	L 66–78	1–3	Cintas Center (9,688); Cincinnati, OH
11/30/15*; 7:00 pm	at North Carolina A&T	L 63–74	1–4	Corbett Sports Center (546); Greensboro, NC
12/05/15*; 8:00 pm	at Eastern Illinois	L 73–79	1–5	Lantz Arena (1,021); Charleston, IL
12/13/15*; 7:00 pm, ESPN3	Norfolk State	W 81–60	2–5	BB&T Arena (2,351); Highland Heights, KY
12/15/15*; 7:00 pm, BTN	at Michigan	L 62–77	2–6	Crisler Center (10,424); Ann Arbor, MI
12/19/15*; 7:00 pm, ESPN3	Southeast Missouri State	W 79–69	3–6	BB&T Arena (2,096); Highland Heights, KY
12/23/15*; 7:00 pm, ESPN3	IU–Kokomo	W 88–44	4–6	BB&T Arena (1,638); Highland Heights, KY
12/30/15*; 7:00 pm, ESPN3	at Toledo	L 73–90	4–7	Savage Arena (4,609); Toledo, OH
Horizon League regular season
01/02/16; 2:00 pm, ESPN3	at Green Bay	L 70–86	4–8 (0–1)	Resch Center (3,560); Green Bay, WI
01/04/16; 8:00 pm, ESPN3	at Milwaukee	L 67–76	4–9 (0–2)	UW–Milwaukee Panther Arena (1,813); Milwaukee, WI
01/09/16; 1:00 pm, ESPN3	Wright State	L 46–60	4–10 (0–3)	BB&T Arena (2,804); Highland Heights, KY
01/14/16; 7:00 pm, ESPN3	Youngstown State	W 84–64	5–10 (1–3)	BB&T Arena (1,866); Highland Heights, KY
01/16/16; 7:00 pm, ESPN3	Cleveland State	L 65–70	5–11 (1–4)	BB&T Arena (2,615); Highland Heights, KY
01/19/16; 7:00 pm, ESPN3	at Oakland	W 90–73	6–11 (2–4)	Athletics Center O'rena (2,533); Rochester, MI
01/22/16; 7:00 pm, ESPN3	UIC	W 82–69 ^{OT}	7–11 (3–4)	BB&T Arena (1,755); Highland Heights, KY
01/24/16; 1:00 pm, ASN	Valparaiso	L 46–71	7–12 (3–5)	BB&T Arena (2,079); Highland Heights, KY
01/29/16; 7:00 pm, ESPN3	at Detroit	W 91–83	8–12 (4–5)	Calihan Hall (2,025); Detroit, MI
02/01/16; 7:00 pm, ESPN3	Oakland	L 74–85	8–13 (4–6)	BB&T Arena (1,746); Highland Heights, KY
02/04/16; 7:00 pm, ESPN3	Green Bay	L 78–85	8–14 (4–7)	BB&T Arena (2,171); Highland Heights, KY
02/06/16; 7:00 pm, ESPN3	Milwaukee	W 75–71	9–14 (5–7)	BB&T Arena (4,084); Highland Heights, KY
02/11/16; 8:00 pm, ESPN3	at Valparaiso	L 52–64	9–15 (5–8)	Athletics–Recreation Center (2,312); Valparaiso, IN
02/13/16; 4:00 pm, ESPN3	at UIC	L 77–79	9–16 (5–9)	UIC Pavilion (2,666); Chicago, IL
02/16/16; 7:00 pm, ESPN3	Detroit	L 68–74	9–17 (5–10)	BB&T Arena (2,357); Highland Heights, KY
02/20/16; 7:00 pm, ESPN3	at Wright State	L 64–67	9–18 (5–11)	Nutter Center (7,825); Fairborn, OH
02/25/16; 7:30 pm, ESPN3	at Cleveland State	L 58–63	9–19 (5–12)	Nutter Center (1,333); Fairborn, OH
02/27/16; 7:00 pm, ESPN3	at Youngstown State	L 75–94	9–20 (5–13)	Beeghly Center (3,349); Youngstown, OH
Horizon League tournament
03/05/16; 2:30 pm, ESPN3	vs. Milwaukee; First round	L 69–86	9–21	Joe Louis Arena (5,247); Detroit, MI
*Non-conference game. ^{#}Rankings from AP Poll. (#) Tournament seedings in parentheses. All times are in Eastern Time.
