= Linc Darner =

American basketball player and coach (born 1970)

Current position
- Title: Head coach
- Team: Tampa
- Conference: SSC

Biographical details
- Born: December 12, 1970 (age 55); Ravenna, Ohio, U.S.

Playing career
- 1990–1994: Purdue

Coaching career (HC unless noted)
- 1994–1995: Purdue (student asst.)
- 1995–1997: Murray State (assistant)
- 1997–1998: Lincoln Memorial (assistant)
- 1998–2002: Ashland (assistant)
- 2002–2006: Saint Joseph's (IN)
- 2006–2015: Florida Southern
- 2015–2020: Green Bay
- 2021–2022: Ball State (associate HC)
- 2022–2023: High Point (assistant)
- 2023–present: Tampa

Head coaching record
- Overall: 384–196 (.662)

Accomplishments and honors

Championships
- Horizon League tournament (2016); NCAA DII National (2015); 6× SSC regular season (2008–2010, 2013–2015); 6× SSC tournament (2008–2009, 2012–2015); GLVC regular season (2006); GLVC tournament (2006)

Awards
- NCAA Division II National Coach of the Year (NABC, 2015); 6× SSC Coach of the Year (2008–2010, 2013–2015)

Linc Mitchel Darner (born December 12, 1970) is an American basketball coach and former men's basketball coach of the University of Wisconsin–Green Bay Phoenix. Darner previously spent nine seasons as the head coach at DII Florida Southern College and four seasons at Saint Joseph's College (Indiana). In 2015, Darner's Florida Southern Moccasins finished 36–1 and won the NCAA Division II National Championship. Darner was named the 2015 NABC UPS DII National Coach of the Year.

Darner took over at Green Bay after Brian Wardle left in 2015. In his first season, he led the Phoenix to their first NCAA Tournament appearance since 1996. Darner was fired on May 17, 2020, after posting a 17–16 record in 2019–20.

== Playing career ==
Darner played high school basketball at Highland High School in Anderson, Indiana. He then went on to Purdue University, where he played four years under legendary Boilermakers head coach Gene Keady. Darner was named team captain as a senior in 1993–94, leading the Boilers to a Big Ten Conference championship and a trip to the Elite Eight.

== Personal life ==
Darner received his bachelor's degree in management from Purdue University in 1995. He and his wife, Kristen, have one daughter, Layne, and one son, Tate. Linc is the son of Alan and Diane Darner. He has two sisters and a brother. His older sisters are named Amy and Kim. Kim played college basketball at Indiana State. Linc's younger brother Tige was also an Indiana All-Star and played collegiate ball at Appalachian State. Linc is the uncle of Sean McDermott, who is currently on the Memphis Hustle roster.

== Head coaching record ==
Record table
Season	Team	Overall	Conference	Standing	Postseason
Saint Joseph's Pumas (Great Lakes Valley Conference) (2002–2006)
2002–03	Saint Joseph's (IN)	11–17	7–13	7th	
2003–04	Saint Joseph's (IN)	15–13	11–9	6th	
2004–05	Saint Joseph's (IN)	17–12	11–9	5th	
2005–06	Saint Joseph's (IN)	31–3	17–2	1st	NCAA DII Second Round
Saint Joseph's (IN):		74–45 (.622)	46–33 (.582)		
Florida Southern Moccasins (Sunshine State Conference) (2006–2015)
2006–07	Florida Southern	8–20	3–13	9th	
2007–08	Florida Southern	24–9	12–4	1st	NCAA DII First Round
2008–09	Florida Southern	29–7	13–3	1st	NCAA DII Regional Finals
2009–10	Florida Southern	25–5	13–3	1st	NCAA DII First Round
2010–11	Florida Southern	23–9	12–4	2nd	NCAA DII Second Round
2011–12	Florida Southern	20–10	9–7	T–5th	NCAA DII First Round
2012–13	Florida Southern	27–6	12–4	T-1st	NCAA DII Elite Eight
2013–14	Florida Southern	27–5	13–4	1st	NCAA DII First Round
2014–15	Florida Southern	36–1	15–1	1st	NCAA DII National champions
Florida Southern:		219–72 (.753)	102–43 (.703)		
Green Bay Phoenix (Horizon League) (2015–2020)
2015–16	Green Bay	23–13	11–7	4th	NCAA DI First Round
2016–17	Green Bay	18–14	12–6	T–3rd	CBI First Round
2017–18	Green Bay	13–20	7–11	7th	
2018–19	Green Bay	21–17	10–8	4th	CIT Runner-up
2019–20	Green Bay	17–16	11–7	3rd	
Green Bay:		92–80 (.535)	51–39 (.567)		
Tampa Spartans (Sunshine State Conference) (2023–pres.)
2023–24	Tampa	8–20	4–16	11th	
2024–25	Tampa	19–9	11–9	4th	
2025–26	Tampa	16–12	10–10	T-5th	
Tampa:		43–41 (.512)	25–35 (.417)		
Total:		428–238 (.643)			
National champion Postseason invitational champion Conference regular season champion Conference regular season and conference tournament champion Division regular season champion Division regular season and conference tournament champion Conference tournament champion
