= 2016 Horizon League men's basketball tournament =

- Classification: Division I
- Season: 2015–16
- Teams: 10
- Site: Joe Louis Arena; Detroit, Michigan
- Champions: Green Bay (2nd title)
- Winning coach: Linc Darner (1st title)
- MVP: Jordan Fouse (Green Bay)
- Television: ESPN3, ESPNU, ESPN

2015–16 Horizon League men's basketball standings
	Conf.				Overall
Team	W		L	PCT	W		L	PCT
Valparaiso	16	–	2	.889	30	–	7	.811
Oakland	13	–	5	.722	23	–	12	.657
Wright State	13	–	5	.722	22	–	13	.629
Green Bay †	11	–	7	.611	23	–	13	.639
Milwaukee	10	–	8	.556	20	–	13	.606
Detroit	9	–	9	.500	16	–	15	.516
Youngstown State	6	–	12	.333	11	–	21	.344
Northern Kentucky*	5	–	13	.278	9	–	21	.300
Cleveland State	4	–	14	.222	9	–	23	.281
UIC	3	–	15	.167	5	–	25	.167
† 2016 Horizon League Tournament winner * Ineligible for NCAA postseason during transition to Division I.

The 2016 Horizon League men's basketball tournament (also known as Motor City Madness) was the conference tournament for the 2015–16 season of the Horizon League. It was played from March 5 through March 8, 2016 at Joe Louis Arena in Detroit. The winner of the tournament received the Horizon League's automatic berth into the 2016 NCAA men's basketball tournament. This was the first Horizon League Tournament since 2002 to be played at a predetermined neutral site.

== Seeds ==
All 10 teams in the conference participated in the tournament. The top two teams received double byes to the semifinals.

For the final time, Northern Kentucky was ineligible for NCAA-operated postseason play during its transition from Division II to Division I. If Northern Kentucky had won the tournament, the loser of the championship game would have received the automatic bid to the NCAA Tournament.

Teams were seeded by record within the conference, with a tiebreaker system to seed teams with identical conference records.

Seed	School	Conference	Tiebreaker
1	Valparaiso	16–2	
2	Oakland	13–5	2–0 vs. Wright State
3	Wright State	13–5	0–2 vs. Oakland
4	Green Bay	11–7	
5	Milwaukee	10–8	
6	Detroit	9–9	
7	Youngstown State	6–12	
8	Northern Kentucky*	5–13	
9	Cleveland State	4–14	
10	UIC	3–15	
*ineligible for NCAA postseason during transition to Division I.

== Schedule ==
Game	Time	Matchup	Final score	Television
First round – Saturday, March 5
1	Noon	No. 4 Green Bay vs. No. 9 Cleveland State	65–53	ESPN3
2	2:30 pm	No. 5 Milwaukee vs. No. 8 Northern Kentucky	86–69	ESPN3
3	5:00 pm	No. 3 Wright State vs. No. 10 UIC	74–43	ESPN3
4	7:30 pm	No. 6 Detroit vs. No. 7 Youngstown State	92–79	ESPN3
Second Round – Sunday, March 6
5	1:00 pm	No. 4 Green Bay vs. No. 5 Milwaukee	70–61	ESPN3
6	3:30 pm	No. 3 Wright State vs. No. 6 Detroit	82–72	ESPN3
Semifinals – Monday, March 7
7	7:00 pm	No. 1 Valparaiso vs. No. 4 Green Bay	92–99^{OT}	ESPNU
8	9:30 pm	No. 2 Oakland vs. No. 3 Wright State	55–59	ESPNU
Championship – Tuesday, March 8
9	7:00 pm	No. 3 Wright State vs. No. 4 Green Bay	69–78	ESPN
All game times in Eastern Time Zone.

== Bracket ==
First round Saturday, March 5
4	Green Bay	65
9	Cleveland State	53
5	Milwaukee	86
8	Northern Kentucky	69
3	Wright State	74
10	UIC	43
6	Detroit	92
7	Youngstown State	79

Second round Sunday, March 6
4	Green Bay	70
5	Milwaukee	61
3	Wright State	82
6	Detroit	72

Semifinals; Monday, March 7
1	Valparaiso	92
4	Green Bay	99*
2	Oakland	55
3	Wright State	59

Championship; Tuesday, March 8
4	Green Bay	78
3	Wright State	69

* - denotes overtime period
