= 2015–16 Oakland Golden Grizzlies men's basketball team =

American college basketball season

2015–16 Oakland Golden Grizzlies men's basketball

Corpus Christi Coastal Classic Laguna Madre Bracket champions

Vegas 16, Runner-up
- Conference: Horizon League
- Record: 23–12 (13–5 Horizon)
- Head coach: Greg Kampe (32nd season)
- Associate head coach: Saddi Washington
- Assistant coaches: Dionne Phelps; Drew Valentine
- Home arena: Athletics Center O'rena

2015–16 Horizon League men's basketball standings
	Conf.				Overall
Team	W		L	PCT	W		L	PCT
Valparaiso	16	–	2	.889	30	–	7	.811
Oakland	13	–	5	.722	23	–	12	.657
Wright State	13	–	5	.722	22	–	13	.629
Green Bay †	11	–	7	.611	23	–	13	.639
Milwaukee	10	–	8	.556	20	–	13	.606
Detroit	9	–	9	.500	16	–	15	.516
Youngstown State	6	–	12	.333	11	–	21	.344
Northern Kentucky*	5	–	13	.278	9	–	21	.300
Cleveland State	4	–	14	.222	9	–	23	.281
UIC	3	–	15	.167	5	–	25	.167
† 2016 Horizon League Tournament winner * Ineligible for NCAA postseason during transition to Division I.

The 2015–16 Oakland Golden Grizzlies men's basketball team represented Oakland University during the 2015–16 NCAA Division I men's basketball season. The Golden Grizzlies were led by 32nd year head coach Greg Kampe and played their home games at the Athletics Center O'rena. They finished the season 23–12, 13–5 in Horizon League play to finish in a tie for second place. They lost in the semifinals of the Horizon League tournament to Wright State. They were invited to the inaugural Vegas 16 where they defeated Towson and East Tennessee State to advance to the championship game where they lost to Old Dominion.

== Preseason ==
The Oakland team traveled to Spain for a week at the end of August. During the trip, they defeated each of the three European professional teams they faced.

Junior point guard Kay Felder was named Horizon League Preseason Player of the Year and Preseason First Team. The vote included coaches, media and sports information directors. Oakland was picked to finish in second place in the league.

Felder was also named to the Lute Olson Award Preseason Watch List. Felder is one of 30 players on the list. The award is given to the "top Division I player who has played at least two seasons."

== Season ==
Oakland finished tied for second in the Horizon League with a 13–5 record. They received the No. 2 seed in the conference tournament and a bye into the semifinals of the tournament where they lost to No. 3 Wright State.

Oakland accepted a bid to the inaugural Vegas 16 tournament where they defeated Towson and East Tennessee State before they lost to Old Dominion 68–67 in the championship game.

After the season, Felder hired an agent and entered the 2016 NBA draft, ending his college eligibility. Felder is the first Oakland player to leave school early to enter the NBA draft.

== Roster ==
2015–16 Oakland Golden Grizzlies men's basketball team
Players
Coaches

Pos.	#	Name	Height	Weight	Year	Previous school	Hometown
C	13	Brad Brechting	6 ft 11 in (2.11 m)	210 lb (95 kg)	Fr	Cedar Springs H.S.	Cedar Springs, Michigan
G	21	Jaevin Cumberland	6 ft 2 in (1.88 m)	165 lb (75 kg)	Fr	Wilmington H.S.	Wilmington, Ohio
G	2	Nick Daniels	6 ft 1 in (1.85 m)	160 lb (73 kg)	RS So	John Glenn H.S.	Westland, Michigan
G	30	Sherron Dorsey-Walker	6 ft 4 in (1.93 m)	200 lb (91 kg)	RS Jr	Romulus H.S.	Detroit, Michigan
G	20	Kay Felder	5 ft 9 in (1.75 m)	176 lb (80 kg)	Jr	Detroit Pershing H.S.	Detroit, Michigan
C	24	Percy Gibson	6 ft 9 in (2.06 m)	233 lb (106 kg)	RS Sr	Southeastern H.S.	Long Island, New York
F	22	Alek Frascone	6 ft 2 in (1.88 m)	178 lb (81 kg)	So	Utica Eisenhower H.S.	Washington Township, Michigan
F	4	Jalen Hayes	6 ft 7 in (2.01 m)	211 lb (96 kg)	RS So	Sexton H.S.	Lansing, Michigan
F	14	Xavier Hill-Mais	6 ft 7 in (2.01 m)	257 lb (117 kg)	Fr	Page H.S.	Greensboro, North Carolina
F	10	Max Hooper	6 ft 6 in (1.98 m)	201 lb (91 kg)	RS Sr	Brewster Academy	Carmel Valley, California
F	25	Femi Olujobi	6 ft 8 in (2.03 m)	233 lb (106 kg)	So	Brentwood H.S.	Detroit, Michigan
G	35	Martez Walker	6 ft 4 in (1.93 m)	185 lb (84 kg)	RS So	Detroit Pershing H.S.	Detroit, Michigan

Head coach

- Greg Kampe (Bowling Green)

Assistant coach(es)

- Saddi Washington
- Dionne Phelps
- Drew Valentine

Legend

- (C) Team captain
- (S) Suspended
- (I) Ineligible
- (W) Walk-on
- Injured
- Current redshirt

Roster
Last update: March 16, 2017

== Schedule ==
The following is Oakland's schedule.

Date time, TV	Rank^{#}	Opponent^{#}	Result	Record	Site (attendance) city, state
Non-conference regular season
November 18, 2015*; 7:00 pm, WMYD/ESPN3		Eastern Michigan	W 91–81	1–0	Athletics Center O'rena (3,808); Rochester, MI
November 22, 2015*; 4:00 pm		at Colorado State; Corpus Christi Coastal Classic	L 89–95	1–1	Moby Arena (2,638); Fort Collins, CO
November 24, 2015*; 8:05 pm, ESPN3		at Southern Illinois; Corpus Christi Coastal Classic	L 88–97	1–2	SIU Arena (4,280); Carbondale, IL
November 27, 2015*; 1:00 pm		vs. Alcorn State; Corpus Christi Coastal Classic	W 84–51	2–2	American Bank Center (103); Corpus Christi, TX
November 28, 2015*; 2:30 pm		vs. Abilene Christian; Corpus Christi Coastal Classic	W 85–57	3–2	American Bank Center (168); Corpus Christi, TX
December 1, 2015*; 7:00 pm, SECN+		at Georgia	L 82–86	3–3	Stegeman Coliseum (5,166); Athens, GA
December 5, 2015*; 4:00 pm, NECFrontRow		at Robert Morris	W 92–74	4–3	Charles L. Sewall Center (2,123); Moon Township, PA
December 7, 2015*; 7:00 pm, WMYD/ESPN3		Binghamton	W 83–72	5–3	Athletics Center O'rena (2,006); Rochester, MI
December 12, 2015*; 7:00 pm, ESPN3		at Toledo	W 76–64	6–3	Savage Arena (4,684); Toledo, OH
December 19, 2015*; 4:30 pm, P12N		at Washington	W 97–83	7–3	Hec Edmundson Pavilion (5,836); Seattle, WA
December 22, 2015*; 7:00 pm, ESPNU		vs. No. 1 Michigan State	L 93–99 ^{OT}	7–4	The Palace of Auburn Hills (20,228); Auburn Hills, MI
December 28, 2015*; 7:00 pm, WMYD/ESPN3		Chicago State	W 101–93	8–4	Athletics Center O'rena (2,016); Rochester, MI
December 30, 2015*; 6:00 pm, ESPNU		at No. 5 Virginia	L 58–71	8–5	John Paul Jones Arena (14,465); Charlottesville, VA
Horizon League regular season
January 2, 2016; 3:00 pm, WMYD/ESPN3		Cleveland State	W 86–68	9–5 (1–0)	Athletics Center O'rena (2,508); Rochester, MI
January 4, 2016; 7:00 pm, ASN		Youngstown State	L 98–100	9–6 (1–1)	Athletics Center O'rena (2,202); Rochester, MI
January 8, 2016; 7:00 pm, ESPN2		Valparaiso	L 67–84	9–7 (1–2)	Athletics Center O'rena (4,110); Rochester, MI
January 10, 2016; 3:00 pm, WMYD/ESPN3		UIC	W 86–61	10–7 (2–2)	Athletics Center O'rena (2,473); Rochester, MI
January 16, 2016; 3:00 pm, WADL-TV/ESPN3		at Detroit	W 86–82	11–7 (3–2)	Calihan Hall (6,125); Detroit, MI
January 19, 2016; 7:00 pm, WMYD/ESPN3		Northern Kentucky	L 73–90	11–8 (3–3)	Athletics Center O'rena (2,533); Rochester, MI
January 23, 2016; 2:00 pm, ESPN3		at Green Bay	W 111–95	12–8 (4–3)	Resch Center (3,928); Green Bay, WI
January 25, 2016; 7:00 pm, ESPN3		at Milwaukee	W 82–79	13–8 (5–3)	UW–Milwaukee Panther Arena (2,821); Milwaukee, WI
January 29, 2016; 7:00 pm, WMYD/ESPN3		Wright State	W 89–63	14–8 (6–3)	Athletics Center O'rena (3,901); Rochester, MI
February 1, 2016; 7:00 pm, ESPN3		at Northern Kentucky	W 85–74	15–8 (7–3)	BB&T Arena (1,746); Highland Heights, KY
February 4, 2016; 7:45 pm, ESPN3		at Youngstown State	W 107–85	16–8 (8–3)	Beeghly Center (2,056); Youngstown, OH
February 6, 2016; 3:00 pm, ESPN3		at Cleveland State	W 67–57	17–8 (9–3)	Wolstein Center (2,475); Cleveland, OH
February 11, 2016; 7:00 pm, WMYD/ESPN3		Milwaukee	L 85–93	17–9 (9–4)	Athletics Center O'rena (3,589); Rochester, MI
February 13, 2016; 3:00 pm, WMYD/ESPN3		Green Bay	W 111–93	18–9 (10–4)	Athletics Center O'rena (3,908); Rochester, MI
February 15, 2016; 5:00 pm, ESPNU		at Wright State	W 89–73	19–9 (11–4)	Nutter Center (4,846); Fairborn, OH
February 19, 2016; 8:00 pm, ESPNU		at Valparaiso	L 84–86	19–10 (11–5)	Athletics–Recreation Center (4,863); Valparaiso, IN
February 21, 2016; 4:00 pm, ASN		at UIC	W 74–63	20–10 (12–5)	UIC Pavilion (2,888); Chicago, IL
February 26, 2016; 9:00 pm, ESPNU		Detroit	W 108–97	21–10 (13–5)	Athletics Center O'rena (4,114); Rochester, MI
Horizon League tournament
March 7, 2016; 9:30 pm, ESPNU	(2)	vs. (3) Wright State; Semifinals	L 55–59	21–11	Joe Louis Arena (6,557); Detroit, MI
Vegas 16 tournament
March 28, 2016*; 9:00 pm, CBSSN		vs. Towson; Quarterfinals	W 90–72	22–11	Mandalay Bay Events Center; Paradise, NV
March 29, 2016*; 11:30 pm, CBSSN		vs. East Tennessee State; Semifinals	W 104–81	23–11	Mandalay Bay Events Center; Paradise, NV
March 30, 2016*; 10:00 pm, CBSSN		vs. Old Dominion; Championship game	L 67–68	23–12	Mandalay Bay Events Center; Paradise, NV
*Non-conference game. ^{#}Rankings from AP Poll. (#) Tournament seedings in parentheses. All times are in Eastern Time.
