= 2016 Vegas 16 Tournament =

2016 Vegas 16
- Season: 2015–16
- Teams: 8
- Finals site: Mandalay Bay Events Center; Paradise, Nevada
- Champions: Old Dominion Monarchs (1st title)
- Runner-up: Oakland Golden Grizzlies (1st title game)
- Semifinalists: UC Santa Barbara Gauchos (1st semifinal); East Tennessee State Buccaneers (1st semifinal)
- Winning coach: Jeff Jones (1st title)
- MVP: Trey Freeman (Old Dominion)
- Top scorer: Kay Felder (Oakland) (80 points)

The 2016 Vegas 16 Tournament was a single-elimination postseason men's basketball tournament won by Old Dominion. The tournament consisted of eight National Collegiate Athletic Association (NCAA) Division I teams that did not receive bids to the NCAA tournament or the NIT.

Old Dominion defeated Oakland 68–67 in the championship game.

Games were played at the Mandalay Bay Events Center in Paradise, Nevada. First round games were March 28, with the semifinals March 29 and the championship March 30. All games aired on CBS Sports Network.

== Participants ==
The eight-team field for the inaugural Vegas 16 tournament was unveiled on March 14, 2016. While organizers had originally aimed to have a sixteen-team field, a decision was made to cut the size to eight teams, stating that due to the results of conference tournaments, "we were hesitant to just fill out the bracket with 'available teams', so by choosing quality over quantity, we settled on eight teams, many of which were considered for an NIT berth."

Team	Conference	Overall record	Conference record
UC Santa Barbara	Big West	18–13	11–5
East Tennessee State	Southern	23–11	14–4
Louisiana Tech	Conference USA	23–9	12–6
Northern Illinois	Mid-American	21–12	9–9
Oakland	Horizon	21–11	13–5
Old Dominion	Conference USA	22–13	12–6
Tennessee Tech	Ohio Valley	19–11	11–5
Towson	Colonial	20–12	11–7

== Schedule ==
Game	Time *	Matchup	Score	Television
Quarterfinals – Monday, March 28
1	Noon	Tennessee Tech vs. **Old Dominion**	59–75	CBSSN
2	2:30 pm	**UC Santa Barbara** vs. Northern Illinois	70–63	CBSSN
3	6:00 pm	**Oakland** vs. Towson	90–72	CBSSN
4	8:30 pm	Louisiana Tech vs. **East Tennessee State**	83–88	CBSSN
Semifinals – Tuesday, March 29
5	6:00 pm	**Old Dominion** vs. UC Santa Barbara	64–49	CBSSN
6	8:30 pm	**Oakland** vs. East Tennessee State	104–81	CBSSN
Championship – Wednesday, March 30
7	7:00 pm	**Old Dominion** vs. Oakland	68–67	CBSSN
*All times are listed as Pacific Daylight Time. Winning team in **bold**.

== Bracket ==
Quarterfinals; Monday, March 28
Tennessee Tech	59
**Old Dominion**	**75**
**UC Santa Barbara**	**70**
Northern Illinois	63
**Oakland**	**90**
Towson	72
Louisiana Tech	83
**East Tennessee State**	**88**

Semifinals; Tuesday, March 29
**Old Dominion**	**64**
UC Santa Barbara	49
**Oakland**	**104**
East Tennessee State	81

Championship; Wednesday, March 30
**Old Dominion**	**68**
Oakland	67

== MVP and all-tournament team ==
Trey Freeman of Old Dominion was named the tournament most valuable player. The following players were named to the all-tournament team:

- Aaron Bacote, Old Dominion
- Kay Felder, Oakland
- Trey Freeman, Old Dominion
- Ge'Lawn Guyn, East Tennessee State
- Max Hooper, Oakland
