= Chris Hill (point guard) =

American basketball player and coach (born 1983)

Western Illinois Leathernecks
- Position: Assistant coach
- League: Ohio Valley Conference

Personal information
- Born: August 8, 1983 (age 43) Chicago, Illinois, U.S.
- Listed height: 5 ft 10 in (1.78 m)
- Listed weight: 160 lb (73 kg)

Career information
- High school: Whitney Young (Chicago, Illinois)
- College: Milwaukee (2001–2006)
- NBA draft: 2006: undrafted
- Playing career: 2006–2010
- Coaching career: 2010–present

Career history

Playing
- 2006–2007: Otopeni
- 2007–2009: Techasas
- 2009: Cherkasy Monkeys
- 2009–2010: Odesa

Coaching
- 2010–2011: Tennessee (GA)
- 2011–2012: Milwaukee (academic advisor)
- 2012–2014: Milwaukee (video coordinator)
- 2014–2015: Milwaukee (DBO)
- 2015–2016: Milwaukee (assistant)
- 2016–2019: Shorewood HS (WI)
- 2019–2021: Wisconsin–Whitewater (assistant)
- 2021–2022: Wisconsin–Parkside (assistant)
- 2022–2023: The Citadel (assistant)
- 2023–present: Western Illinois (assistant)

Chris Hill (born August 8, 1983) is an American former professional basketball player who has played in Liga II, the Lithuanian Basketball League and the Baltic Basketball League. He also played for NCAA Division I's University of Wisconsin–Milwaukee Panthers.

== Amateur career ==
He was a member of the Milwaukee Panthers men's team that won the Horizon League regular season championship three consecutive years from 2004 to 2006 and won back-to-back Horizon League men's basketball tournaments in 2005 and 2006. He was a member of the team that made the sweet sixteen for the first time in school history at the 2005 NCAA Men's Division I Basketball Tournament, leading the team in assists in each of its three games.

In high school, he led Whitney Young High School to a second place Chicago Public League finish. He was a four-year starter at Whitney Young.

== Pro career ==
He has played professionally for CS Otopeni of Liga II (2006–07) and BC Techasas of Lithuanian Basketball League and the Baltic Basketball League (2008–09).
