= Beeghly Center =

Sports arena at Youngstown State University

Beeghly Physical Education Center
- Beeghly Center
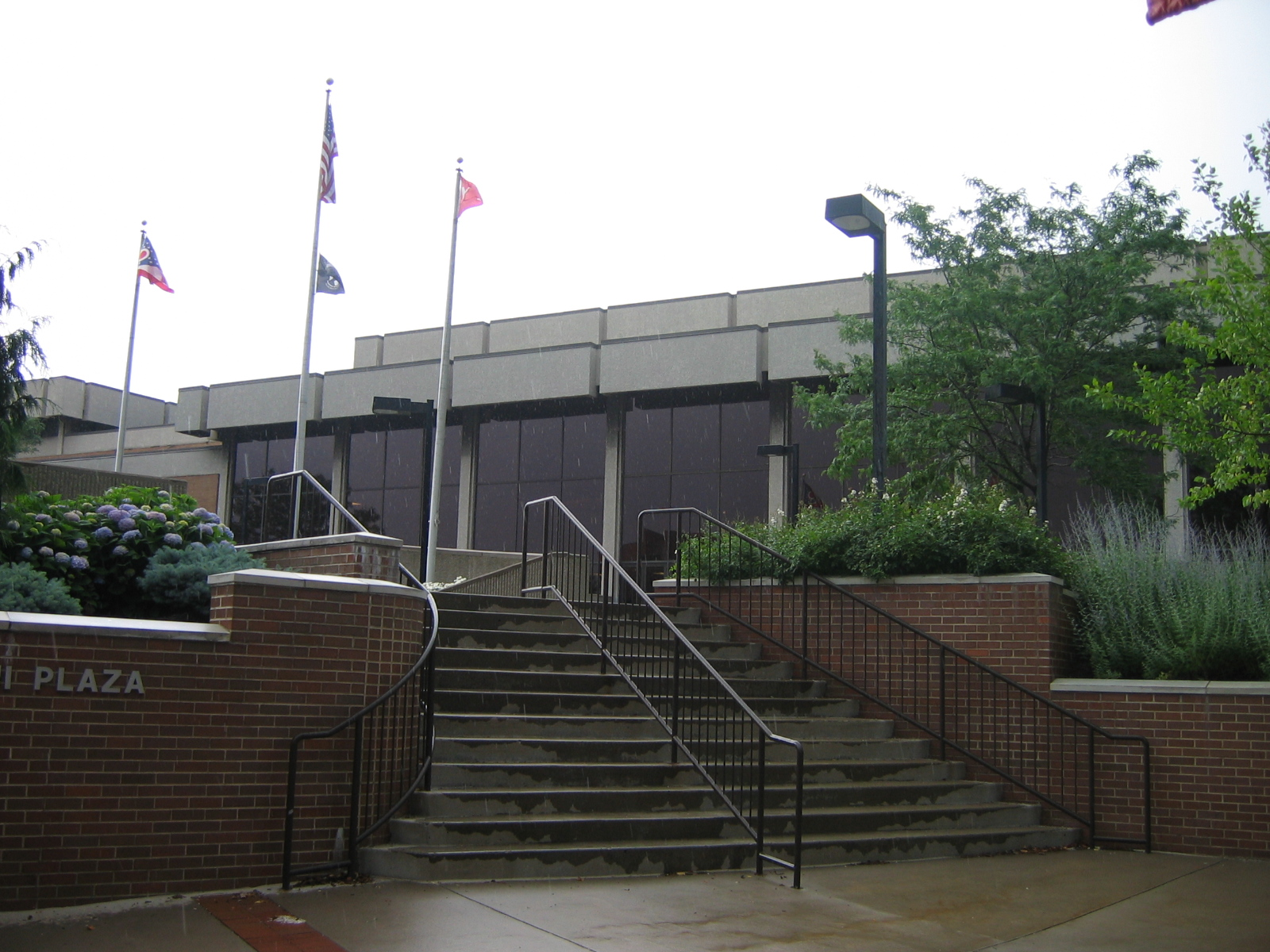
- Interactive map of Beeghly Physical Education Center
- Location: 1 Tressel Way; Youngstown, Ohio 44555
- Coordinates: 41°6′29″N 80°38′56″W
- Owner: Youngstown State University
- Operator: Youngstown State University
- Capacity: 6,300 (1972–2024); 4,633 (2024–present)

Construction
- Groundbreaking: April 27, 1972
- Opened: December 2, 1972
- Renovated: May 2024
- Cost: US$5.5 million ($42.3 million in 2025 dollars)
- Architect: Raymond J. Jaminet

Tenants
- Youngstown State Penguins (NCAA) (1972–present); Youngstown Pride (WBL) (1988–1992)

The Beeghly Physical Education Center, or simply Beeghly Center, is a 4,633-seat multi-purpose arena in Youngstown, Ohio. The arena, built at a cost of $5.5 million and named for local businessman Leon A. Beeghly, opened on December 2, 1972. It is home to the Youngstown State University Penguins basketball, volleyball, and swimming teams. The first event at the arena was a basketball game against the Ohio University Bobcats, which ended in a 68–59 Youngstown State victory.

The arena, which originally seated 6,000, has undergone many changes since its opening. The Youngstown State women's basketball team moved into the arena in the mid-1970s. In 1983, permanent seats at both ends of the court and 1,260 chairback seats at mid-court were added. On September 15, 1996, YSU dedicated Veterans' Plaza directly in front of Beeghly Center. This $500,000 community project was funded in-part through private donations to honor all United States Veterans. In 2000, the court was repainted, two additional scoreboards were added and expanded press-row seating was created. In May 2002, the facility underwent more than $2.5 million in additional renovations, including a new front and rear lobby, new hallways and locker rooms and a new $150,000 sound system.

The multipurpose facility includes an Olympic-sized swimming and diving facility, racquetball and squash courts, classrooms, and administrative offices. Beeghly is also home to the men's and women's basketball offices as well as the Olympic sports offices.

In addition to YSU intercollegiate basketball and volleyball contests, as well as university events, Beeghly Center has served as the site for high school competitions, World Wrestling Entertainment matches (though the WWE now uses the newer Covelli Centre nearby when visiting Youngstown), concerts, tradeshows, and numerous other functions that dot the busy facility schedule throughout the year. The venue also hosted a Barack Obama rally in February 2008.

The Beeghly Center holds many YSU classes throughout each semester, as well as the Youngstown City School District's "All-City" Science Fair competition. The facility is used for graduation ceremonies at the end of every semester.

The facility should not be confused with the nearby—and newer—Beeghly Hall, where YSU's Beeghly College of Education is housed, and also holds YSU classes.

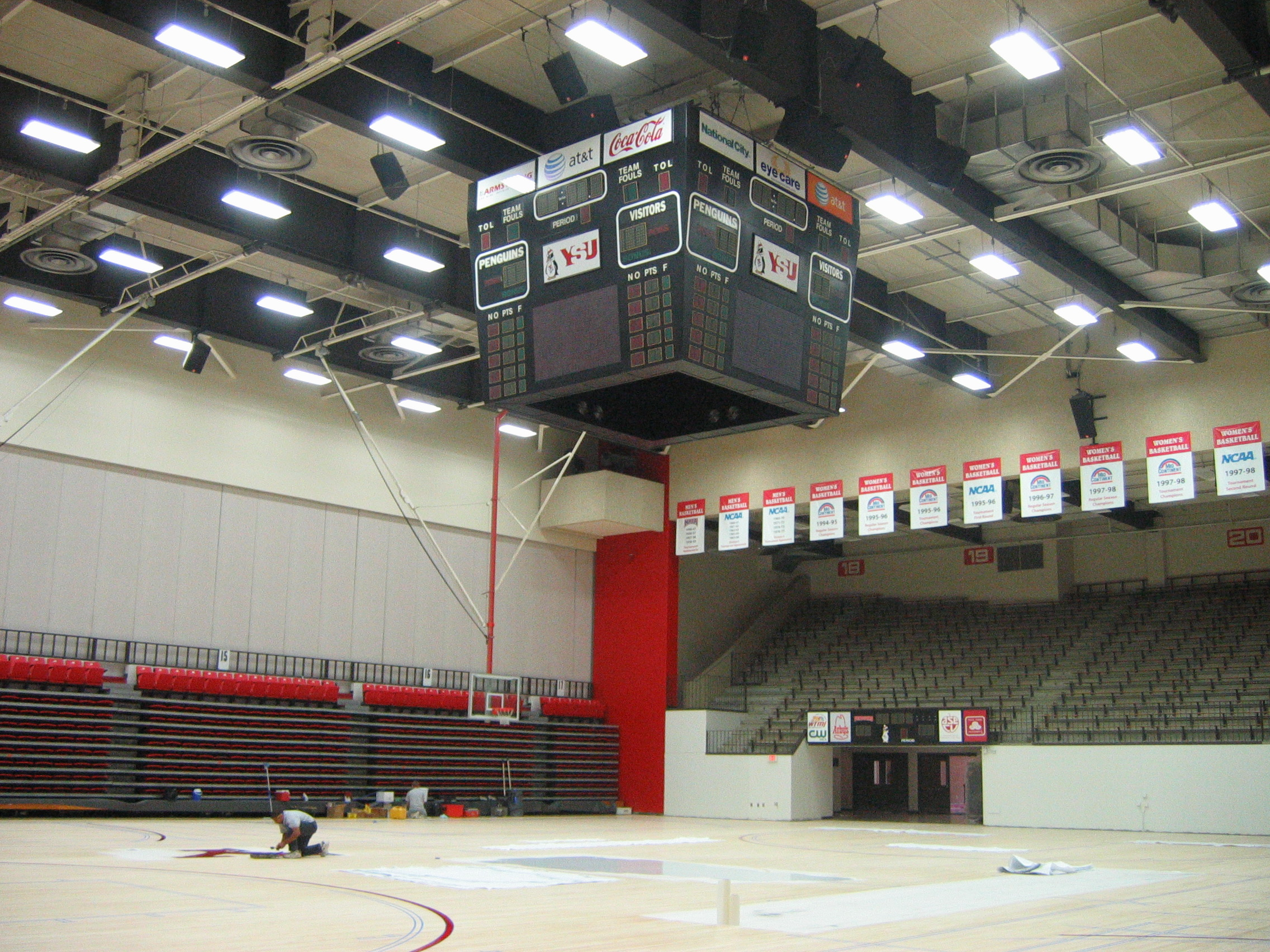
Interior 2008

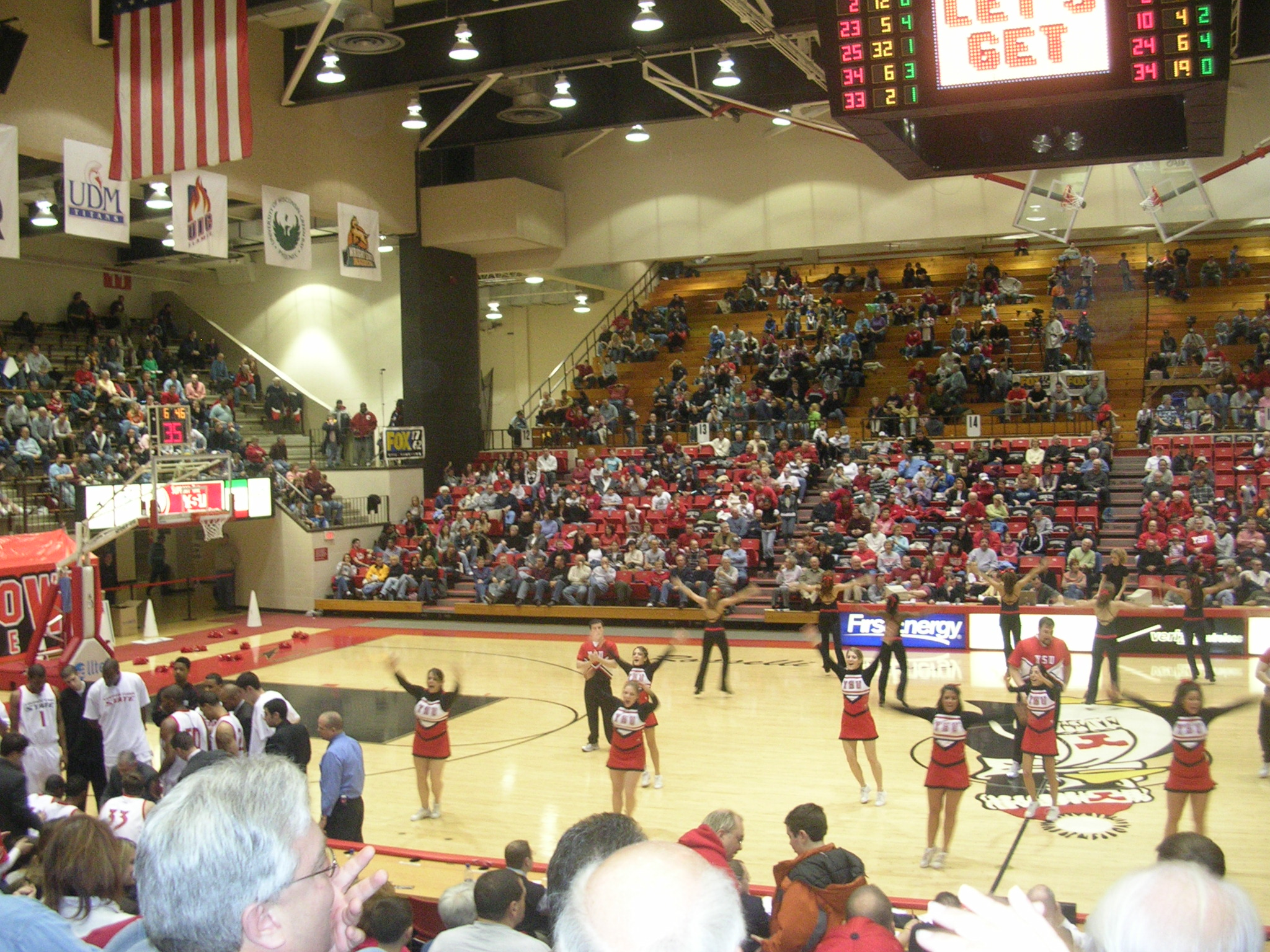
Interior 2006

== See also ==
- List of NCAA Division I basketball arenas
