= List of film production companies =

This is a list of film production and distribution companies. A production company may specialize in producing their in-house films or own subsidiary development companies. Major production companies often distribute films from independent production companies. This list includes both active and no longer active (defunct) companies. Active production companies are either run by themselves or as a subsidiary.

Film studios also create television programs for broadcast syndication.

Pornographic film studios and production companies are not included in this list: they can be found on the separate list of pornographic film studios.

== Notable production companies ==
Company	Country	Headquarters	Est.	Notes
Aleph Producciones	Argentina	Buenos Aires	1990	
Argentina Sono Film	Argentina	Buenos Aires	1933	
BD Cine	Argentina	Buenos Aires	1995	
Guacamole Films	Argentina	Buenos Aires	2002	
Patagonik Film Group	Argentina	Buenos Aires	1996	
Pol-ka	Argentina	Buenos Aires	1994	
Arclight Films	Australia	Sydney, New South Wales	2002	Founded by Gary Hamilton; studios in Los Angeles
Blackfella Films	Australia	Sydney, New South Wales	1992	Founded and run by Rachel Perkins
Disney Studios Australia	Australia	Sydney, New South Wales	1998	Parent is Walt Disney Studios
Efftee Studios	Australia	Sydney, New South Wales	1933	Founded in Melbourne; defunct 1935.
Filmology Finance	Australia	Melbourne, Australia	2013	Founded by Jack Christian
KOJO Studios	Australia	Adelaide, South Australia	1991	Founded by producer Kent Smith
Limelight Department	Australia	Melbourne, Victoria	1891	Founded by Salvation Army Adjutant Joseph Perry; the first in Australia; defunct 1910.
Madman Entertainment	Australia	Melbourne, Victoria	1996	
Rising Sun Pictures	Australia	Adelaide, South Australia	1995	
South Australian Film Corporation	Australia	Adelaide, South Australia	1972/2011	Statutory corporation; Adelaide Studios opened 2011
Village Roadshow	Australia	Melbourne, Victoria	1954	
Village Roadshow Studios	Australia	Gold Coast, Queensland	1991	Parent is Village Roadshow
Working Dog Productions	Australia	Melbourne, Victoria	1993	
Tiger Media	Bangladesh	Dhaka	2014	
Jaaz Multimedia	Bangladesh	Dhaka	2011	
Fatman Films	Bangladesh	Dhaka	2011	
Monsoon Films	Bangladesh	Dhaka	2010	
Impress Telefilm	Bangladesh	Dhaka	1996	
Belarusfilm	Belarus	Minsk	1928	
Studio 100	Belgium	Schelle	1996	
Globo Filmes	Brazil	Rio de Janeiro	1998	
Nu Boyana Film Studios	Bulgaria	Sofia	1962	
Allude Entertainment	Canada	Vancouver	2012	
Atopia	Canada	Montreal, Quebec	2000	
Bleeding Art Industries	Canada	Calgary, Alberta	2002	
Breakthrough Entertainment	Canada	Toronto, Ontario	1986	
Telescene Film Group	Canada	Montreal, Quebec	1977	Defunct in 2001
The Bridge Studios	Canada	Burnaby, British Columbia	1987	
Brightlight Pictures	Canada	Vancouver, British Columbia	2001	
Cloud Ten Pictures	Canada	St. Catharines, Ontario	1994	
DHX Media	Canada	Halifax	2006	Children's television
Lionsgate Canada	Canada	Toronto, Ontario	1973	Subsidiary of Lionsgate Studios
Leda Serene Films	Canada	Toronto, Ontario	1999	
Malofilm	Canada	Montreal, Quebec	1983	
National Film Board of Canada	Canada	Montreal, Quebec	1939	
Paperny Entertainment	Canada	Vancouver, British Columbia	1994	
Shaftesbury Films	Canada	Toronto, Ontario	1987	
Shavick Entertainment	Canada	Vancouver, British Columbia	1993	
Suneeva	Canada	Toronto, Ontario	2005	
Alibaba Pictures	China	Zhejiang	2014	
Asia Film Company	China	Shanghai	1909	Defunct in 1914
Beijing Enlight Pictures	China	Beijing	2000	
Beijing Galloping Horse Group	China	Beijing	2003	
Changchun Film Group Corporation	China	Changchun, Jilin	1950	
China Film Group Co., Ltd.	China	Beijing	2010	Owned by China Film Group Corporation
China Film Group Corporation	China	Beijing	1999	
Diantong Film Company	China	Shanghai	1934	Defunct in 1935
DMG Entertainment	China	Beijing	1993	
Fantasy Pictures	China	Beijing	2005	
Film Workshop	China	Hong Kong	1984	
Fly Films	China	Shanghai	2004	
Fundamental Films	China	Shanghai	2008	
Golden Princess Film Production	China	Hong Kong	1987	
Great Wall Film Company	China	Shanghai	1920	Last known film was 1930
Hengdian World Studios	China	Dongyang	1996	
Heyi Pictures	China			
Huayi Brothers	China	Beijing	1994	
Imar Film Company	China	Beijing	1997	
L'est Films Group	China	Beijing	2008	
Laurel Films	China	Beijing	2000	
Lianhua Film Company	China	Shanghai	1930	Defunct in 1937
Mandarin Films	China	Hong Kong	1991	
Media Asia Entertainment Group	China	Hong Kong	1994	Parent is Lai Sun Development
Mingxing Film Company	China	Shanghai	1922	Defunct in 1937
China Sun Motion Picture Company	China	Hong Kong	1922	Defunct in 1937, absorbed into the Lianhua Film Company
MZ Pictures	China	Shanghai	2009	
Northeast Film Studio	China	Changchun	1945	Defunct in 1955
One Hundred Years of Film	China	Hong Kong	1999	Parent is China Star Entertainment Group
Orange Sky Golden Harvest	China	Hong Kong	1970	
Pearl Studios	China	Shanghai	2012	Subsidiary by China Media Capital
Polybona Films	China	Beijing	1999	
Shanghai Animation Film Studio	China	Shanghai	1957	
Shanghai Film Group Corporation	China	Shanghai	2001	
Shanghai Film Studio	China	Shanghai	1949	Part of the Shanghai Film Group Corporation since 2001
Shaw Brothers	China	Hong Kong	1958	Defunct in 2011
Sil-Metropole Organisation	China	Hong Kong	1982	Formed through the merger of four large studios
Sundream Motion Pictures	China	Hong Kong	2005	
Tianyi Film Company	China	Shanghai	1925	Defunct in 1937
Wanda Media	China	Beijing	2010	
Wenhua Film Company	China	Shanghai	1946	Defunct in 1952
Win's Entertainment	China	Hong Kong	1990	Defunct in 2009
Xinhua Film Company	China	Shanghai	1934	Defunct in 1942
Xstream Pictures	China	Beijing	2003	
Zagreb Film	Croatia	Zagreb	1953	Primarily animation
Jadran Film	Croatia	Zagreb	1946	
Croatia Film	Croatia	Zagreb	1946	
Barrandov Studios	Czech Republic	Prague	1921	
Nordisk Film	Denmark	Valby, Copenhagen	1906	Oldest continuously active studio in the world
Saga Studios	Denmark	Copenhagen	1942	Defunct in 1974
Zentropa	Denmark	Avedøre, Copenhagen	1992	
Adastra Films	France	Cannes	2008	
Disneynature	France	Paris	2008	Subsidiary of The Walt Disney Studios
Les Films du Poisson	France	Paris	1995	
Gaumont	France	Paris	1895	First and oldest film company in the world
Pathé	France	Paris	1896	
StudioCanal	France	Paris	1988	
Bavaria Film	Germany	Munich	1919	
Constantin Film	Germany	Munich	1950	
DEFA	Germany	Berlin	1946	State-owned, defunct in 1992
Neue deutsche Filmgesellschaft	Germany	Munich	1947	
Rialto Film	Germany	Berlin	1897	
Studio Babelsberg	Germany	Potsdam	1912	
Universum Film AG (UFA)	Germany	Berlin	1917	
Wild Bunch	Germany	Berlin	1979	Previously a part of French firm StudioCanal
Finos Film	Greece	Athens	1943	Defunct in 1977 (temporarily), 2006 comeback
Pannonia Film Studio	Hungary	Budapest	1956	Animation
Blueeyes Productions	Iceland	Reykjavík	1999	Later became RVK Studios
RVK Studios	Iceland	Reykjavík	2013	Formed from Blueeyes Productions
True north	Iceland	Reykjavík	2003	
Sagafilm	Iceland	Reykjavík	1978	
70mm Entertainments	India	Hyderabad, Telangana	2015	
Aashirvad Cinemas	India	Kochi, Kerala	2000	
Ajay Devgn FFilms	India	Mumbai, Maharashtra	1999	
Annapurna Studios	India	Hyderabad, Telangana	1975	
Anurag Kashyap Films	India	Mumbai, Maharashtra	2005	Founded by Anurag Kashyap
Arka Media Works	India	Hyderabad, Telangana	2001	
AVM Productions	India	Chennai, Tamil Nadu	1945	
Balaji Motion Pictures	India	Mumbai, Maharashtra	2001	Subsidiary of Balaji Telefilms
Balaji Telefilms	India	Mumbai, Maharashtra	1994	
Bombay Talkies	India	Mumbai, Maharashtra (then Bombay)	1934	Defunct as of 1954
Chilsag Entertainment Network	India	Mumbai, Maharashtra	2003	
CineMan Productions	India	Ahmedabad, Gujarat	2010	Founded by Abhishek Jain
Clean Slate Films	India	Mumbai, Maharashtra	2014	Founded by Anushka Sharma, Karnesh Sharma
Cloud Nine Movies	India	Chennai, Tamil Nadu	2008	Subsidiary of Kalaignar TV
DAR Motion Pictures	India	Mumbai, Maharashtra	2009	
Dharma Productions	India	Mumbai, Maharashtra	1976	
Eros International	India	Mumbai, Maharashtra	1977	
Eskay Movies	India	Kolkata, West Bengal	1988	Founded as Eskay Video Private Limited
Excel Entertainment	India	Mumbai, Maharashtra	1999	
Felis Creations	India	Bangalore, Karnataka	2006	
First Frame Entertainments	India	Hyderabad, Telangana	2008	
Fox Star Studios	India	Mumbai, Maharashtra	2008	Subsidiary of 21st Century Fox
Gemini Studios	India	Chennai, Tamil Nadu	1940	
Geetha Arts	India	Hyderabad, Telangana	1972	
Hari Om Entertainment	India	Mumbai, Maharashtra	2008	Founded by Akshay Kumar
Hombale Films	India	Bangalore, Karnataka	2012	
Illuminati Films	India	Mumbai, Maharashtra	2009	Founded by Saif Ali Khan and Dinesh Vijan
Kanteerava Studios	India	Bangalore, Karnataka	1966	
Kavithalaya Productions	India	Chennai, Tamil Nadu	1981	
Lyca Productions	India	Chennai, Tamil Nadu	2014	Founded by Subaskaran Allirajah
Madras Talkies	India	Chennai, Tamil Nadu	1995	Founded by Mani Ratnam and Suhasini Maniratnam
Mukta Arts	India	Mumbai, Maharashtra	1978	
Mythri Movie Makers	India	Hyderabad, Telangana	2015	
Nadiadwala Grandson Entertainment	India	Mumbai, Maharashtra	1970	Founded by Sajid Nadiadwala
Padmalaya Studios	India	Hyderabad, Telangana	1970	
Percept Picture Company	India	Mumbai, Maharashtra	2002	
PVR Pictures	India	Gurgaon, Haryana	1997	
Rajshri Productions	India	Mumbai, Maharashtra	1947	
Real Image Media Technologies	India	Chennai, Tamil Nadu	1986	
Reliance Big Entertainment	India	Mumbai, Maharashtra	2005	Subsidiary of Reliance Anil Dhirubhai Ambani Group
Red Chillies Entertainment	India	Mumbai, Maharashtra	2002	
R.K. Films	India	Mumbai, Maharashtra	1948	
S Pictures	India	Chennai, Tamil Nadu	1999	
Sahara One	India	New Delhi, Delhi	2000	
Shree Ashtavinayak Cine Vision	India	Mumbai, Maharashtra	2001	
Shree Venkatesh Films	India	Kolkata, West Bengal	1996	
Sivaji Productions	India	Chennai, Tamil Nadu	1956	
Sri Venkateswara Creations	India	Hyderabad, Telangana	2003	Founded by Dil Raju
Sri Venkateswara Cine Chitra	India	Hyderabad, Telangana	2003	Founded by B. V. S. N. Prasad
Studio Green	India	Chennai, Tamil Nadu	2006	
Sun Pictures	India	Chennai, Tamil Nadu	2008	
Suresh Productions	India	Hyderabad, Telangana	1963	Founded by D. Ramanaidu
Surinder Films	India	Kolkata, West Bengal	1970	
T-Series	India	New Delhi, Delhi	2001	Founded by Gulshan Kumar, mainly a music studio
Tips Industries	India	Mumbai, Maharashtra	1975	
Thenandal Studio Limited	India	Chennai, Tamil Nadu	1976	Founded by Rama Narayanan
Trimurti Films	India	Mumbai, Maharashtra	1970	
Bryanston Distributing Company	United States	New York City, New York	1972	Defunct and liquidated in 1976 following numerous criminal issues.
UTV Motion Pictures	India	Mumbai, Maharashtra	2004	Subsidiary of UTV Software Communications and The Walt Disney Company
Vaaraahi Chalana Chitram	India	Hyderabad, Telangana	2012	Founded by Sai Korrapati
Viacom 18 Motion Pictures	India	Mumbai, Maharashtra	2008	Subsidiary of Viacom 18 and Viacom
Vijaya Productions	India	Chennai, Tamil Nadu	1948	Moola Narayana Swamy, B. N. Reddy
Vinod Chopra Films	India	Mumbai, Maharashtra	1985	
Vishesh Films	India	Mumbai, Maharashtra	1986	
Vyjayanthi Movies	India	Hyderabad, Telangana	1974	Founded by C. Aswani Dutt
Yash Raj Films	India	Mumbai, Maharashtra	1970	
YNOT Studios	India	Chennai, Tamil Nadu	2010	Founded by S. Sashikanth
Zee Entertainment Enterprises	India	Mumbai, Maharashtra	1992	Founded by Subhash Chandra
Berita Film Indonesia	Indonesia	Jakarta	1945	
IDN Pictures	Indonesia	Jakarta	2020	
Imajinari Pictures	Indonesia	Jakarta	2022	
Perfini	Indonesia	Jakarta	1950	
Produksi Film Negara	Indonesia	Jakarta	1949	
Rapi Films	Indonesia	Jakarta	1968	
Visinema Pictures	Indonesia	Jakarta	2008	
Ardmore Studios	Ireland	Bray, County Wicklow	1958	
Cinecittà	Italy	Rome	1937	
Titanus	Italy	Rome	1904	
Eiken	Japan	Tokyo	1969	Subsidiary of Asatsu-DK, previously Television Corporation of Japan
Enoki Films	Japan	Tokyo	1975	
Kadokawa Pictures	Japan	Tokyo	2007	Defunct 2011, subsidiary of Kadokawa Corporation
Makino Film Productions	Japan	Unknown	1923	Defunct 1931
Nikkatsu	Japan	Tokyo	1912	
Shintoho	Japan	Tokyo	1947	Defunct 1961
Shochiku	Japan	Tokyo	1920	
Studio Ghibli	Japan	Tokyo	1985	
Taishō Katsuei	Japan	Tokyo	1920	Defunct 1922
Tennenshoku Katsudō Shashin	Japan	Tokyo	1914	Defunct 1919
Toei Company	Japan	Tokyo	1950	Parent of Toei Animation
Toho	Japan	Tokyo	1932	
Yokota Shōkai	Japan	Tokyo	1901	Defunct 1912, merged into Nikkatsu
Yoshizawa Shōten	Japan	Tokyo	1897	Defunct 1912, merged into Nikkatsu
Astro Shaw	Malaysia	Kuala Lumpur	2005	
KRU Studios	Malaysia	Kuala Lumpur	1992	
New Zealand Film Commission	New Zealand	Wellington	1978	
New Zealand On Air	New Zealand	Wellington	1989	
WingNut Films	New Zealand	Wellington	2003	
Rok Studios	Nigeria	Lagos, Lagos	2013	
Silverbird Film Distribution	Nigeria	Lagos, Lagos	2007	
Fuuse Films	Norway	Oslo	2010	Founded by activist and filmmaker Deeyah Khan
Maipo Film	Norway	Oslo	2000	Part of Nordisk Film
Norsk Film	Norway	Jar	1932	Defunct 2001
SF Norge	Norway	Oslo	1989	Part of Svensk Filmindustri
Storm Studios	Norway	Oslo	2001	
GMA Films	Philippines	Quezon City	1995	
LVN Pictures	Philippines	Quezon City	1936	Defunct 2005
OctoArts Films	Philippines	Quezon City	1989	
Regal Films	Philippines	Quezon City	1962	
Reyna Films	Philippines	Manila	1991	
Sampaguita Pictures	Philippines	Quezon City	1937	Defunct 1982
Star Cinema	Philippines	Quezon City	1993	
Viva Films	Philippines	Quezon City	1981	
Appetite Production	Poland	Kraków	2008	
Se-ma-for	Poland	Łódź	1947	
MediaPro Pictures	Romania	Bucharest	1998	
Castel Film Romania	Romania	Bucharest	1992	
Gorky Film Studio	Russia	Moscow	1915	
Lenfilm	Russia	Saint Petersburg	1918	
Petersburg Animation Studio	Russia	Saint Petersburg	2003	
Wizart Animation	Russia	Voronezh	2007	
InlayFilm	Russia	Moscow	2007	
Animaccord Animation Studio	Russia	Moscow	2008	
Melnitsa Animation Studio	Russia	Saint Petersburg	1999	
Mosfilm	Russia	Moscow	1920	
Soyuzmultfilm	Russia	Moscow	1936	
Sverdlovsk Film Studio	Russia	Ekaterinburg	1943	
Lesta Studio	Russia	Saint Petersburg	1991	
Art Pictures Studio	Russia	Moscow	1992	
Non-Stop Production	Russia	Moscow	2005	
Bazelevs Company	Russia	Moscow	1991	
Russian World Studios	Russia	Moscow	1998	
Central Partnership	Russia	Moscow	1996	
Enjoy Movies	Russia	Moscow	2010	
Glavkino	Russia	Krasnogorsk	2008	
Lennauchfilm	Russia	Saint Petersburg	1933	
Central Studio for Documentary Film	Russia	Moscow	1927	
Proline Film	Russia	Saint Petersburg	2004	
Svarog Films	Russia	Saint Petersburg	1998	
Soho Media	Russia	Moscow	1993	
Pink International Company	Serbia	Belgrade	1998	
Triglav Film	Slovenia	Ljubljana	1947	
Cape Town Film Studios	South Africa	Cape Town	2010	
Triggerfish Animation Studios	South Africa	Cape Town	1996	
Cinema Service	South Korea	Seoul	1995	
CJ E&M Film Division	South Korea	Seoul	1993	
Coridel Entertainment	South Korea	Seoul	2015	
DSP	South Korea	Seoul	1991	
LOEN Entertainment	South Korea	Seoul	1978	
Lotte Entertainment	South Korea	Seoul	2003	
Myung Films	South Korea	Seoul	1995	
Next Entertainment World	South Korea	Seoul	2008	
Showbox	South Korea	Seoul	2016	Branch of Mediaplex, Inc., entertainment arm of Orion Group
Sidus Pictures	South Korea	Seoul	1995	
Europafilm	Sweden	Stockholm	1929	
Film i Väst	Sweden	Trollhättan	1992	
Sonet Film	Sweden	Stockholm	1984	
SF Studios	Sweden	Stockholm	1919	
Five Star Production	Thailand	Bangkok	1973	
GDH 559	Thailand	Bangkok	2016	
GMM Tai Hub	Thailand	Bangkok	2003	Defunct 2015
Kantana Group	Thailand	Bangkok	1951	
Phranakorn film	Thailand	Bangkok	2001	
Sahamongkol Film International	Thailand	Bangkok	1970	
Star Films	Turkey	Istanbul	1989	
Dovzhenko Film Studio	Ukraine	Kyiv	1927	
Anglo-Amalgamated	United Kingdom	London	1945	Defunct 1971, back catalog owned by StudioCanal
Associated British Picture Corporation	United Kingdom	Elstree	1927	Defunct 1970
Aura Films	United Kingdom	Colchester, Essex	2011	
BBC Films	United Kingdom	London	1990	
British Lion Films	United Kingdom	London	1919	
DNA Films	United Kingdom	London	1997	
Dragon International Film Studios	United Kingdom	Llanilid, Wales	2006	
Ealing Studios	United Kingdom	London	1931	
Eon Productions	United Kingdom	London	1961	
Film Tank	United Kingdom	Burnham-on-Sea, Somerset	2009	
Film4 Productions	United Kingdom	London	1982	
Fingercuff Productions	United Kingdom	London	2000	
Gainsborough Pictures	United Kingdom	London	1924	Defunct in 1951.
Gate Studios	United Kingdom	Borehamwood, Hertfordshire	1928	Defunct in 1954.
Hammer Film Productions	United Kingdom	London	1934	See List of Hammer films.
Heyday Films	United Kingdom	London	1997	
Intermedia	United Kingdom	London	1995	Previously used as German tax shelter.
ITC Entertainment Productions	United Kingdom	London	1958	Defunct 1998. Back catalog owned by many different firms.
Magma Pictures	United Kingdom	London	2004	
Marv Films	United Kingdom	London	2004	
Merton Park Studios	United Kingdom	London	1930	Last film was in 1967.
MGM-British Studios	United Kingdom	Denham, Buckinghamshire and Borehamwood, Hertfordshire	1936	Subsidiary of Metro-Goldwyn-Mayer. Defunct 1973.
Pinewood Studios	United Kingdom	Iver, Buckinghamshire	1935	See List of Pinewood Studios productions.
PolyGram Filmed Entertainment	United Kingdom	London	1979	Acquired by Universal Studios in 2000.
Rank Organisation Film Productions	United Kingdom	London	1937	Defunct in 1996.
See-Saw Films	United Kingdom, Australia	London, Sydney	2008	
Shepperton Studios	United Kingdom	Shepperton, Surrey	1931	Part of Pinewood Studios as of 2001.
Sister	United Kingdom & United States	London, Manchester, Los Angeles, New York City	2019	Co-founded by Elisabeth Murdoch, Jane Featherstone, and Stacey Snider; absorbed Sister Pictures (founded 2014 by Featherstone)
Syncopy Inc.	United Kingdom	London	2001	Founded by Christopher Nolan and Emma Thomas.
Teddington Studios	United Kingdom	London	1910	Part of Pinewood Studios until 2014.
Three Mills Studios	United Kingdom	London	1990	
Twickenham Film Studios	United Kingdom	London	1913	
Vertigo Films	United Kingdom	London	2002	
Warp Films	United Kingdom	London	1999	Sister company to Warp Records.
Working Title Films	United Kingdom	London	1983	Owned by NBCUniversal
40 Acres and a Mule Filmworks	United States	New York City, New York	1986	Founded by Spike Lee.
606 Films	United States	Los Angeles, California	2014	Founded by Halle Berry. Housed at CBS Television Studios.
2929 Productions	United States	Dallas, Texas	2003	Founded by Mark Cuban and Todd Wagner.
Affirm Films	United States	Culver City, California	2007	Acquired by Sony Pictures Entertainment; Christian films
Allied Artists Pictures Corporation	United States	Los Angeles, California	1931	Previously Monogram Pictures.
Amazon MGM Studios	United States	Culver City, California	2010	Founded by Amazon (company)
Amblin Entertainment	United States	Universal City, California	1981	Founded by Steven Spielberg, Kathleen Kennedy and Frank Marshall.
Amblin Partners	United States	Universal City, California	2015	Founded by Steven Spielberg, Jeff Skoll, Darren Throop And Anil Ambani
American International Pictures	United States	Los Angeles, California	1956	Acquired by Filmways.
American Zoetrope	United States	San Francisco, California	1969	Founded by Francis Ford Coppola and George Lucas.
Apple Studios	United States	Cupertino, California	2019	Founded by Apple Inc.
Artisan Entertainment	United States	New York City, New York	1982	Started as LIVE Entertainment and acquired by Lions Gate in 2004.
Batjac Productions	United States	Los Angeles, California	1952	Founded by John Wayne and Robert Fellows.
Blinding Edge Pictures	United States	Berwyn, Pennsylvania	2000	Founded by M. Night Shyamalan.
Blue Sky Studios	United States	Greenwich, Connecticut	1987	Acquired by 20th Century Studios; defunct in 2021.
Bonfire Legend	United States	Nashville, Tennessee	2016	
Capitol Films	United States	Los Angeles, California	1992	
Caravan Pictures	United States	Santa Monica, California	1992	Owned by The Walt Disney Company; defunct in 1999.
Carolco Pictures	United States	Boca Raton, Florida	1976	Bankrupt in 1995. Brand revived in 2015 before being renamed Recall Films two years later following a legal dispute.
Castle Rock Entertainment	United States	Beverly Hills, California	1987	Acquired by Time Warner
CBS Films	United States	Los Angeles, California	2007	CBS made a brief move into film production in the late 1960s and CBS Theatrical Films in 1979 (Founded as Cinema Center Films)
Cedar Grove Productions	United States	Los Angeles, California	1996	
Christie Film Company	United States	Hollywood, California	1916	Founded by Al Christie and Charles Christie. Defunct 1933.
Cinemation Industries	United States	New York City, New York	1965	Defunct 1975
Cinergi Pictures	United States	Santa Monica, California	1989	Defunct 1998
Columbia Pictures	United States	Culver City, California	1924	Acquired by Sony Pictures Entertainment
Compass International Pictures	United States	Unknown	1977	Defunct 1988
Davis Entertainment	United States	Unknown	1984	Founded by John Davis.
Destination Films	United States	Santa Monica, California	1993	Subsidiary
Dimension Films	United States	New York City, New York	1992	Originally a Miramax Films division
DreamWorks Pictures	United States	Universal City, California	1994	Part of Amblin Partners
DreamWorks Animation	United States	Glendale, California	2004	Subsidiary of Universal Pictures
Edison's Black Maria	United States	West Orange, New Jersey	1893	World's first film production studio. Defunct 1901.
Electric Entertainment	United States	Los Angeles, California	2001	
Elevating Entertainment Motion Pictures	United States	Nashville, Tennessee	2007	Family-friendly projects
Embassy Pictures	United States	New York City, New York	1942	Defunct 1986
Esperanto Filmoj	United States	Los Angeles, California	2004	
Essanay Studios	United States	Chicago, Illinois	1907	Defunct 1918
Famous Players Film Company	United States		1912	
Famous Players–Lasky	United States		1914	
Film Booking Offices of America	United States		1919	
FilmNation Entertainment	United States	New York City, New York	2008	Founded by Glen Basner; A division of Infrared Pictures
Filmways	United States	Sonoma County, California	1958	Acquired by Orion Pictures
Fine Line Features	United States	New York City, New York	1990	Originally a division of New Line Cinema
First Look Studios	United States	Century City, California	1993	
First National	United States		1917	
Five & Two Pictures	United States		2002	Christian films
Flavor Unit Entertainment	United States	Miami, Florida	1995	Privately held, originally headquartered in Jersey City, New Jersey
Focus Features	United States	Universal City, California	1992	Started as Gramercy Pictures and acquired by Universal Studios, then renamed USA Films
Four Star Productions	United States		1952	
Fox Atomic	United States	Century City, California	2006	Defunct
Fox Film Corporation	United States		1915	Merged with 20th Century Pictures to form 20th Century Fox
20th Century Pictures	United States		1933	Merged with Fox Film Corporation to form 20th Century Fox
Fox Searchlight Pictures	United States	Century City, California	1994	
Gener8Xion Entertainment	United States	Hollywood, California	1995	Christian films
Gnome Motion Picture Company	United States	New York City, New York	1910	Likely never released any productions, presumed defunct in 1911.
Golan-Globus	United States		1967	
Goldwyn Pictures	United States		1916	Merged with Metro Pictures and Louis B. Mayer Pictures to form Metro-Goldwyn-Mayer
Samuel Goldwyn Productions	United States		1923	
Hallmark Productions	United States		1944	
Hannover House	United States	Springdale, Arkansas	1993	
Happy Madison Productions	United States		1999	
Heritage Film Project	United States	Charlottesville, Virginia	2008	
Hollywood Pictures	United States	Burbank, California	1989	Defunct in 2007, was a part of The Walt Disney Studios
IFC Films	United States	New York City, New York	1999	Owned by Rainbow Media
Image Entertainment	United States	Los Angeles, California	1981	
Interscope Pictures	United States		1982	
Kalem Company	United States		1907	
Kendrick Brothers	United States	Albany, Georgia	2013	Christian films
Keystone Studios	United States		1912	
Legendary Pictures	United States		2000	
Liberty Films	United States		1945	
Lightstorm Entertainment	United States		1990	
Lightyear Entertainment	United States		1987	
Lions Gate Entertainment	United States	Santa Monica, California	1995	
Lubin Studios	United States		1896	
Lucasfilm	United States		1971	Since October 2012 a part of The Walt Disney Studios
Magnolia Pictures	United States	New York City, New York	2001	
Marvel Studios	United States	Manhattan Beach, California	2007	Part of Walt Disney Studios
Mascot Pictures Corporation	United States		1927	
Mercury Radio Arts	United States	Las Colinas, Irving, Texas	2002	Owned by Glenn Beck, and owns TheBlaze
Metro Pictures	United States		1915	Merged with Goldwyn Pictures and Louis B. Mayer Pictures to form Metro-Goldwyn-Mayer
Metro-Goldwyn-Mayer	United States	Century City, California	1924	Owned by Highland Capital, Anchorage Capital Group LLC, Third Point LLC and Solus Alternative Asset Management LP
Miramax Films	United States	New York City, New York	1979	Division of Walt Disney Studios from 1993 to 2010; owned by Filmyard Holdings from 2010 to 2016; owned by beIN Media Group and Paramount Skydance from 2016–present
Mutual Film	United States		1912	Defunct since 1918
Newmarket Films	United States	Los Angeles, California	1989	
Nestor Studios	United States		1909	
New Line Cinema	United States	New York City, New York	1967	Acquired by Warner Bros. Discovery
Netflix Animation Studios	United States	Los Gatos, California	2018	Subsidiary of Netflix, Inc.
Original Film	United States		1997	
Orion Pictures Corporation	United States	Los Angeles, California	1978	Acquired by MGM
Overture Films	United States	Beverly Hills, California	2006	Owned by Liberty Media
Pacific International Enterprises	United States	Medford, Oregon	1952	
Paramount Animation	United States	Los Angeles, California	2011	
Paramount Pictures	United States	Hollywood, California	1912	The fourth oldest film studio in the world.
Paramount Vantage	United States	Los Angeles, California	1996	Originally known as Paramount Classics
Picturehouse	United States	New York City, New York	2005	
Possibility Pictures	United States	Orlando, Florida	2002	Christian films
Premium Picture Productions	United States		1921	
Producers Releasing Corporation	United States	Los Angeles, California	1939	Assets acquired by Eagle-Lion Films in 1950, which in turn was acquired by United Artists in 1955
Pure Flix Entertainment	United States	Scottsdale, Arizona	2005	Christian films
Reliance-Majestic Studios	United States		1914	
Republic Pictures	United States	Los Angeles, California	1935	Mainly a film library company, formerly a leading B movie studio
RKO Pictures	United States	New York City, New York	1928	Acquired byConcord
Rogue Pictures	United States	Universal City, California	1992	Acquired by Relativity Media
Rolfe Photoplays	United States		1915	
Rooster Teeth Productions	United States	Austin, Texas	2003	
Samuel Goldwyn Films	United States	New York City, New York	1979	Founded as Samuel Goldwyn Company, acquired by Orion Pictures then formed Independently in 1999
Scott Free	United States		1970	
Screen Gems	United States	Culver City, California	1940	Founded as an animation studio, subsidiary
Screen Media Films	United States	New York City, New York	2001	
Seen by Scene Communications	United States	Eagle Mountain, Utah	1947	
Selig Polyscope Company	United States		1896	
Selznick International Pictures	United States		1935	
Sherwood Pictures	United States	Albany, Georgia	2002	Christian films
Silver Pictures	United States		1985	
Skydance Productions	United States		2010	
Solax Studios	United States		1910	
Sony Pictures Classics	United States	Culver City, California	1991	Subsidiary
Sony Pictures Motion Picture Group	United States	Culver City, California	1998	Owned by Sony. Originally launched as Columbia TriStar.
Spyglass Entertainment	United States		1988	
Strand Releasing	United States	Culver City, California	1989	
Sun Haven Studios	United States		1932	
Summit Entertainment	United States	Universal City, California	1996	
Temple Hill Entertainment	United States		2006	
Thanhouser Company	United States		1909	
The Samuel Goldwyn Company	United States	Santa Monica, California	1979	
THINKFilm	United States	Defunct 2010		
Through A Glass Productions	United States		2002	
Tiffany Pictures	United States		1921	
Touchstone Pictures	United States	Burbank, California	1984	Defunct in 2017, was a part of The Walt Disney Studios
Trimark Pictures	United States	Los Angeles, California	1985	Started as Vidmark Entertainment, acquired by Lions Gate
TriStar Pictures, Inc.	United States		1982	
TriStar Pictures	United States	Culver City, California	1982	Founded as Nova Pictures, subsidiary
Troma Entertainment	United States	New York City, New York	1974	
20th Century Studios	United States	Century City, California	1935	Owned by The Walt Disney Company
20th Century Animation	United States	Century City, California	1997	Defunct
Uncommon Productions	United States	Boston, MA	2000	
United Artists Entertainment, LLC	United States	Century City, California	1919	Principally a distributor, e.g. James Bond Series. (Acquired by MGM) (Run by Cruise/Wagner Productions)
United States Productions	United States		1946	
Universal Pictures	United States	Universal City, California	1912	also known as Universal-International Pictures Inc. (aka U-I)
Victor Studios	United States		1912	
Vitagraph Studios	United States		1897	
Vivendi Entertainment	United States	Universal City, California	2000	2013
Walden Media	United States		2001	
The Walt Disney Studios	United States		1923	Prior to 1983 their films were released under Walt Disney Productions
Walt Disney Pictures	United States	Burbank, California	1923	Prior to 1983 their films were released under Walt Disney Productions
Warner Bros.	United States	Burbank, California	1923	Owned by Warner Bros. Discovery
Warner Independent Pictures	United States	Burbank, California	2003	
The Weinstein Company	United States	New York City, New York	2005	Also a distributor, e.g. The King's Speech, Hoodwinked!; Defunct and liquidated in 2018.
Tyler Perry Studios	United States	Atlanta, Georgia	2006	
Welling Films	United States		2006	
Western Film Exchange	United States		1906	
The Whartons Studio	United States		1914	
World Wide Pictures	United States	Minneapolis, Minnesota	1951	Christian films
Worldview Entertainment	United States		2007	
WWE Studios	United States	Los Angeles, California	2002	
Yari Film Group	United States	Los Angeles, California	2006	

== See also ==
- Film producer
- List of animation studios
- List of documentary films
- List of film and television directors
- List of film distributors by country
- List of television production companies
- Lists of actors
- Lists of films
- Major film studio
