= EFG =

EFG may refer to:

- EF-G or elongation factor G
- Edge-defined film-fed growth
- Edinburgh Film Guild
- Effective field goal percentage in basketball
- Effingham station, in Illinois, United States
- EFG-Hermes, an Egyptian investment bank
- EFG International, a Swiss banking group
- Electric field gradient
- Enterprise Finance Guarantee
- Efogi Airport, in Papua New Guinea
- European Film Gateway
- Exercise Franchise For Good Governance, in India
- L'est Films Group, a Chinese production company
