= Appetite (disambiguation) =

Appetite is the desire for nourishment.

Appetite may also refer to:

== Music ==
- Appetite (Kris Delmhorst album), 1998
- Appetite (Walter TV album), 2012
- "Appetite" (Akina Nakamori song), 1997
- "Appetite" (Prefab Sprout song), 1985
- "Appetite" (Zach Bryan song), 2026
- "Appetite", a song by Katharine McPhee from the 2015 album Hysteria
- "Appetite", a 2008 song by Usher from the album Here I Stand

== Other arts and entertainment ==
- Appetite (art gallery), a former Argentinian art gallery
- Appetite (journal), a journal of behavioral sciences and food intake
- Appetite Production, a Polish film production company

== Other uses ==
- Specific appetite, a drive to eat foods with specific flavors or other characteristics
- Appetites of the soul, a concept in Thomist philosophy; see Thomism § Soul

== See also ==
- Apatite, a group of phosphate minerals
- Appetition, the philosophical concept of desire
- Appetizer
- Bon Appétit (disambiguation)
