= Duncan Robinson =

American basketball player (born 1994)

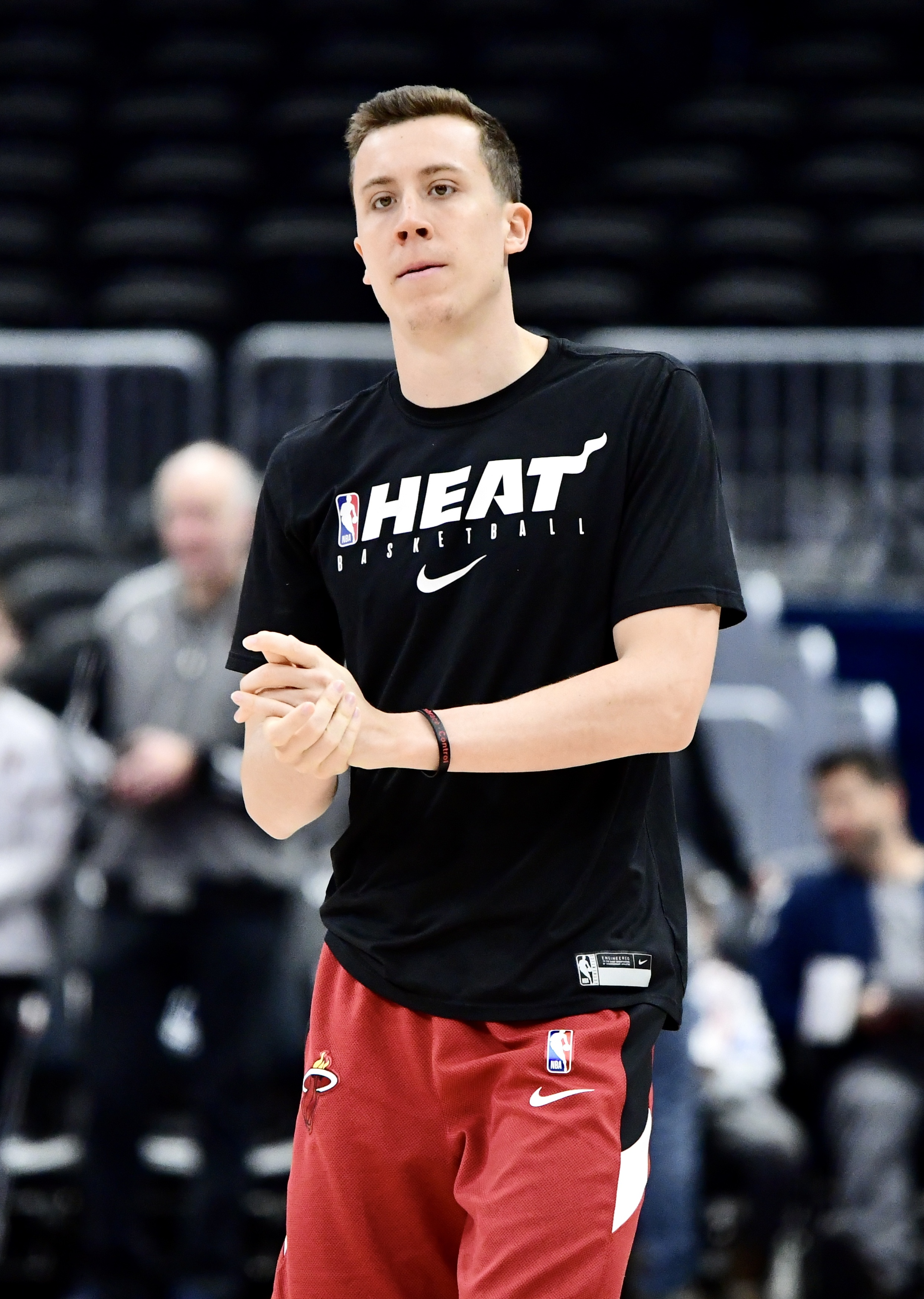
- Robinson with the Miami Heat in 2020

No. 55 – Detroit Pistons
- Position: Small forward
- League: NBA

Personal information
- Born: April 22, 1994 (age 32) York, Maine, U.S.
- Listed height: 6 ft 7 in (2.01 m)
- Listed weight: 215 lb (98 kg)

Career information
- High school: The Governor's Academy (Byfield, Massachusetts); Phillips Exeter Academy (Exeter, New Hampshire)
- College: Williams (2013–2014); Michigan (2015–2018)
- NBA draft: 2018: undrafted
- Playing career: 2018–present

Career history
- 2018–2025: Miami Heat
- 2018–2019: →Sioux Falls Skyforce
- 2025–present: Detroit Pistons

Career highlights
- NBA G League All-Rookie Team (2019); Third-team All-NBA G League (2019); Big Ten Sixth Man of the Year (2018); Division III Rookie of the Year (2014); Fourth-team Division III All-American (2014); Second-team All-NESCAC (2014)
- Stats at NBA.com
- Stats at Basketball Reference

Duncan McBryde Robinson (born April 22, 1994) is an American professional basketball player for the Detroit Pistons of the National Basketball Association (NBA). He played college basketball for the NCAA Division III Williams College Ephs and then the NCAA Division I Michigan Wolverines. He transferred to Michigan after leading Williams College to the 2014 NCAA Division III men's basketball tournament championship game. At Michigan, he was part of the 2017–18 team that lost to Villanova in the championship game of the 2018 NCAA Division I men's basketball tournament.

Robinson led the Big Ten Conference in three-point shooting percentage (.450) from the beginning of conference play in December 2015 until early February 2016. In his three-year career at Michigan, he was a member of conference tournament champions in 2017 and 2018. Robinson was the 2018 Big Ten Conference Sixth Man of the Year. After going undrafted in the 2018 NBA draft, he signed with the Miami Heat. Robinson set numerous three-point shot records during his tenure with the Heat and helped Miami reach the NBA Finals in 2020 and 2023. He is the only player from Williams College to ever play in the NBA.

== Early life ==
Born April 22, 1994, in York, Maine, Robinson is the son of Elisabeth and Jeffrey Robinson and the youngest of their three children (after sister Marta and brother Eli). He is part Hawaiian on his mother's side. Robinson grew up in the town of New Castle, New Hampshire (population 1,000), where his Maude H. Trefethen Elementary School 6th grade graduating class was composed of just four students.

== High school career ==
Robinson attended Rye Junior High School and elected to attend The Governor's Academy in Massachusetts rather than Portsmouth High School, which is the public high school for students in New Castle. Robinson began his freshman season as a 5-foot-7-inch (1.70 m) point guard for The Governor's Academy in 2008 but did not play much until he became "serviceable" as a junior. In his early years, he practiced shooting for hours, attempting to make 1,600 shots per week. Robinson started working with trainer Noah LaRoche during his junior season. After averaging 18.5 points as a senior at The Governor's Academy, he was selected to the 2012 All-NEPSAC Class B first team and the 2012 All-Independent School League (ISL) team. Following his senior season, Robinson measured 6 feet 6 inches (1.98 m) and 175 pounds (79.4 kg). By the end of the summer, he had grown to 6 feet 8 inches (2.03 m) and 195 pounds (88.5 kg). He graduated with a 3.55 G.P.A.

Following his senior season, Robinson played on the spring and summer Amateur Athletic Union (AAU) circuit. Robinson played for Michael Crotty Jr.'s Middlesex Magic AAU team. Crotty had been a two-time All-American at Williams College, having served as point guard for the 2003 NCAA Division III Tournament champions (and 2004 Tournament runners up). Robinson then did a postgraduate year at Phillips Exeter Academy in order to increase his college prospects. He led Exeter to a 28–1 record, ending on an 18-game win streak that included the school's first NEPSAC Class A championship victory on March 10 against Choate Rosemary Hall. Robinson posted 24 points and 10 rebounds in the championship game, earning the Tournament MVP in addition to 2013 NEPSAC Class A All-League first team honors.

During the last weekend of September 2012 while on a campus visit, Division III Williams made Robinson an offer that he accepted immediately. At the time, Williams was ranked the number one liberal arts college in the country according to U.S. News & World Report, and the school was a Division III basketball powerhouse. They had gone 93–22 over the prior four seasons under head coach Mike Maker. Nonetheless, his only scholarship offer was from NCAA Division II's Merrimack College. He also had interest from Division I Brown Bears and Columbia Lions as well as Division III Bates College and Amherst College.

== College career ==
=== Williams College ===
Prior to the November 15, 2013, season opener against Southern Vermont College, Williams was ranked third among Division III teams according to the preseason poll. Williams lost in the shadow of a home court scheduling conflict despite 5–6 shooting by Robinson. Robinson became the only freshman starter in Maker's six-year tenure as head coach at Williams. In his 2013–14 freshman season at Williams, Robinson was twice named New England Small College Athletic Conference (NESCAC) Player of the Week during the regular season. Williams reached the 2014 NCAA Men's Division III basketball tournament championship game, but fell 75–73 to University of Wisconsin–Whitewater as Robinson scored 17 points. After Williams took a one-point lead with 4.9 seconds left, Wisconsin pushed the ball upcourt without calling time-out to score the winning basket in what Chris Strauss of USA Today described as the best NCAA basketball tournament game of the weekend. Robinson had posted 30 points in the tournament semifinals against bitter rival Amherst College who had defeated Williams in the season's three previous meetings. Williams finished the season with a 28–5 record. That season, he set school records for single-season minutes played 1,110 minutes and freshman-season points scored (548). As a freshman, he led the NESCAC in 3-point field goal percentage (44.8%) and minutes played (1108), while ranking 2nd in minute per game (34.6 v. 35.4 by Joey Kizel of Middlebury College). In conference games, Robinson led the conference in 3-point field goal percentage (50%) and 3-point shots made per game (3.6). Following the season, he was the NESCAC Rookie of the Year and a Second Team All-NESCAC selection. Robinson became Williams' first freshman to be named All-American (4th team, D3Hoops.com), first D3Hoops.com National Rookie of the Year, first freshman NCAA All-Tournament Team selection and first freshman 500-point scorer.

Following the 2013–14 season, Maker left Williams to become the head coach for the Marist Red Foxes. Robinson was immediately contacted by schools from the ACC, Big 12, Big Ten, Pac-12, Atlantic 10, Ivy League, Patriot League and America East conferences. Among the schools that were interested were Creighton, Boston College and Providence. After his freshman success, he had decided that he would only leave Williams to play for a winning program that was an elite academic institution and that used a system and style that he had become used to. Robinson had played against Nik Stauskas in NEPSAC play and was impressed with how Michigan's John Beilein had developed "under-recruited players" such as Stauskas who was a 1st round selection in the 2014 NBA draft. Maker had been an assistant coach for Beilein at West Virginia from 2005 to 2007. At both Exeter and Williams, Robinson had played in systems that were similar to the one that Beilein runs at Michigan. Robinson asked Maker to contact Beilein who on faith replied that Michigan may have interest at the preferred walk-on level. Robinson was not interested in walk-on consideration given competing scholarship offers. A week later, after seeing video, Beilein said Michigan was considering a scholarship offer. Robinson scheduled visits to Michigan and new Atlantic 10 member Davidson. After the visit to Michigan, Robinson committed to the school. He announced his decision via Twitter on August 6, 2014.

=== University of Michigan ===
==== Sophomore season ====
Besides Bob McCann, who transferred from Division III Upsala College to Morehead State University after his freshman season, Robinson is the only other player to transfer from Division III to Division I with a full scholarship, according to some sources. During the 2014–15 NCAA Division I season, Robinson redshirted for the Michigan Wolverines, meaning that he could not participate in games, but could practice with the team. In December 2014 with assistant coach Jeff Meyer as his rebounder, Robinson broke Stauskas's Michigan Wolverines practice record for three-pointers in a drill (five minutes, one ball, one rebounder) by posting 78, surpassing Stauskas by three.

In Robinson's second game for the 2015–16 Michigan Wolverines, he posted 19 points on 6–6 shooting (5–5 three-point shots) from the floor against Elon on November 16, 2015. On December 1, in the ACC–Big Ten Challenge against NC State, he posted 17 points on 5–7 three-point shooting, which established a Michigan record for single ACC-B1G game 3-point shooting percentage (min five attempts). On December 12, Michigan defeated Delaware State 80–33, as Robinson made his first career start for Michigan by posting 11 points on 3–5 three-point shooting. At the time, Robinson ranked third in the nation in three-point shooting percentage. Note that various sources have various eligibility thresholds. E.g., while BigTen.org only requires a minimum of 1.0 made per game, NCAA.org requires a minimum of 2.5 made per game. On December 23, Robinson tied his career high (set twice at Williams) with six assists against Bryant. The game marked the ninth consecutive game in which he made at least three three-point shots. Robinson entered conference play as the Big Ten leader in three-point field goal percentage and led the Big Ten Conference in both three-point field goals (52) and three-point field goal percentage (.565) through the first week of the Big Ten Conference schedule. On January 12, with leading scorer Caris LeVert sidelined, Michigan defeated Maryland 70–67 as Robinson contributed 17 points on 5–9 three-point shooting. On January 23, Michigan defeated Nebraska 81–68, behind a game-high and season-high 21 points by Robinson. With the Cornhusker defense challenging his three-point shot, he scored more points inside the three-point line than outside it for the first time as a Wolverine. The January 27 game against Rutgers marked the 17th consecutive game in which Robinson made at least two three-point shots. Robinson made only one three-point shot in each the subsequent two games against Penn State and Indiana. Nonetheless, Robinson entered the February 6 Michigan–Michigan State rivalry game against the 10th-ranked Michigan State Spartans as the Big Ten Conference leader in three-point shots made and three-point field goal percentage, but he was held to 0–3 in three-point shooting in the game. The game marked the first time since the season opener, that Robinson did not make a single three-point shot, ending a 22-game streak. On February 10, Michigan defeated Minnesota as Robinson posted a game- and season-high nine rebounds to go along with 14 points on 4-for-7 three-point shooting.

On March 10, in Michigan's first game of the 2016 Big Ten Conference men's basketball tournament against Northwestern, Robinson scored 21 points including a three-point shot that tied the score with 46.5 seconds remaining in overtime. The following day, in the quarterfinals against first-seeded Indiana, Robinson again put Michigan in position to win by tying the score with a three-point shot with 46 seconds remaining (this time in regulation). The following day, in the semifinals against Purdue, Robinson recorded his 90th three-pointer of the season, becoming just the fifth Wolverine in history to reach the milestone. On March 16, in the First Four round of the 2016 NCAA Division I men's basketball tournament, Michigan defeated Tulsa, 67–62, with support from Robinson who recorded his first double-double as a Wolverine with 13 points and a season-high 11 rebounds. Robinson finished the season second to Bryn Forbes (48.1%) among Big Ten players in three-point field goal percentage with a 45.0% mark.

==== Junior season ====
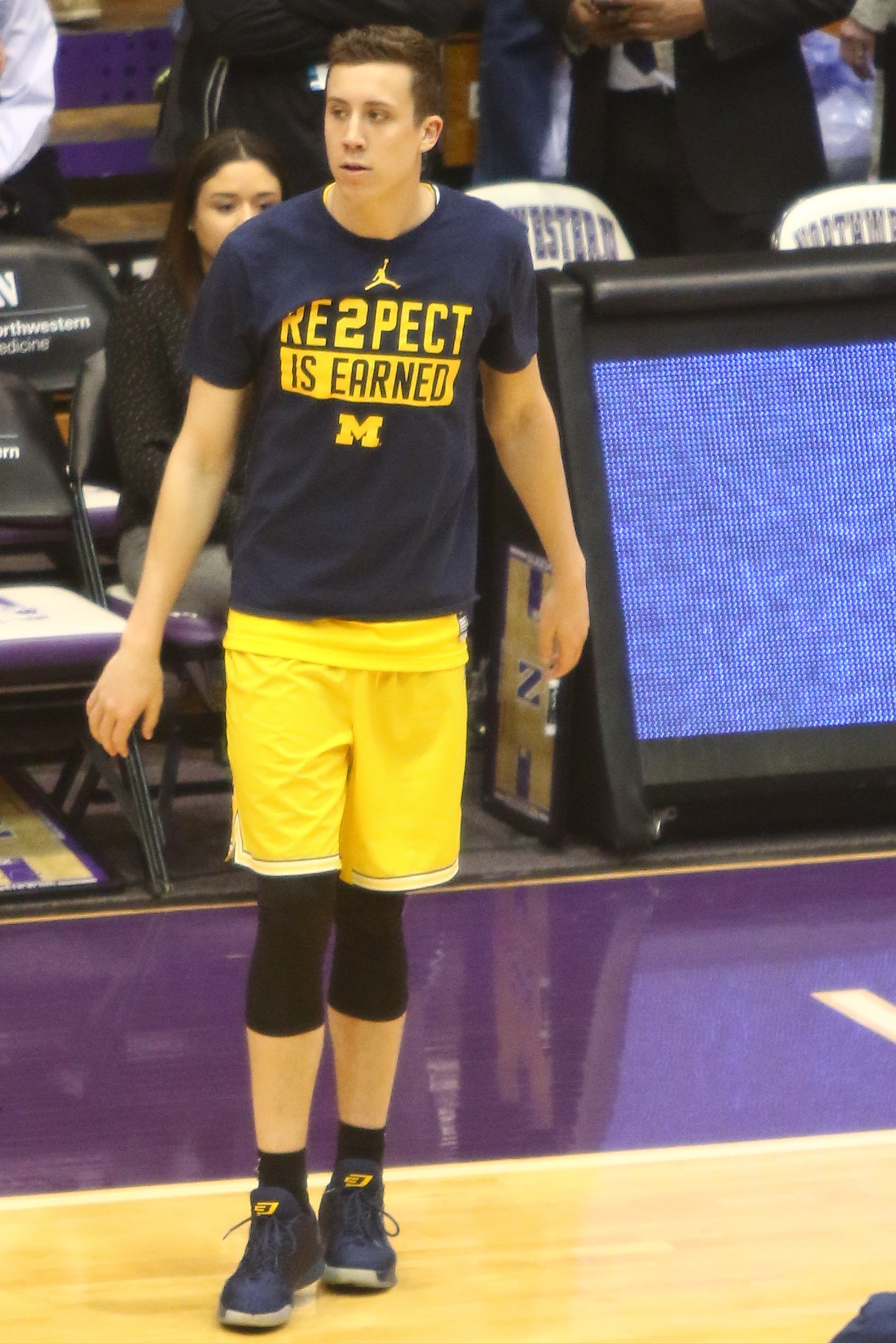
Robinson in 2017 for the 2016–17 Michigan Wolverines

Following the previous season, several other wing players left the team. Caris LeVert graduated. Aubrey Dawkins transferred to play for the UCF Knights. Kameron Chatman announced his intention to transfer. Robinson mostly came off the bench, although he did start one game due to a bookkeeping error on December 17 against Maryland Eastern Shore. Late in the season, he began producing The Dak and Dunc Show podcast with teammate Andrew Dakich for WCBN-FM Sports, which was available on iTunes. The team won the 2017 Big Ten Conference men's basketball tournament and reached the sweet sixteen round of the 2017 NCAA Division I men's basketball tournament.

==== Senior season ====
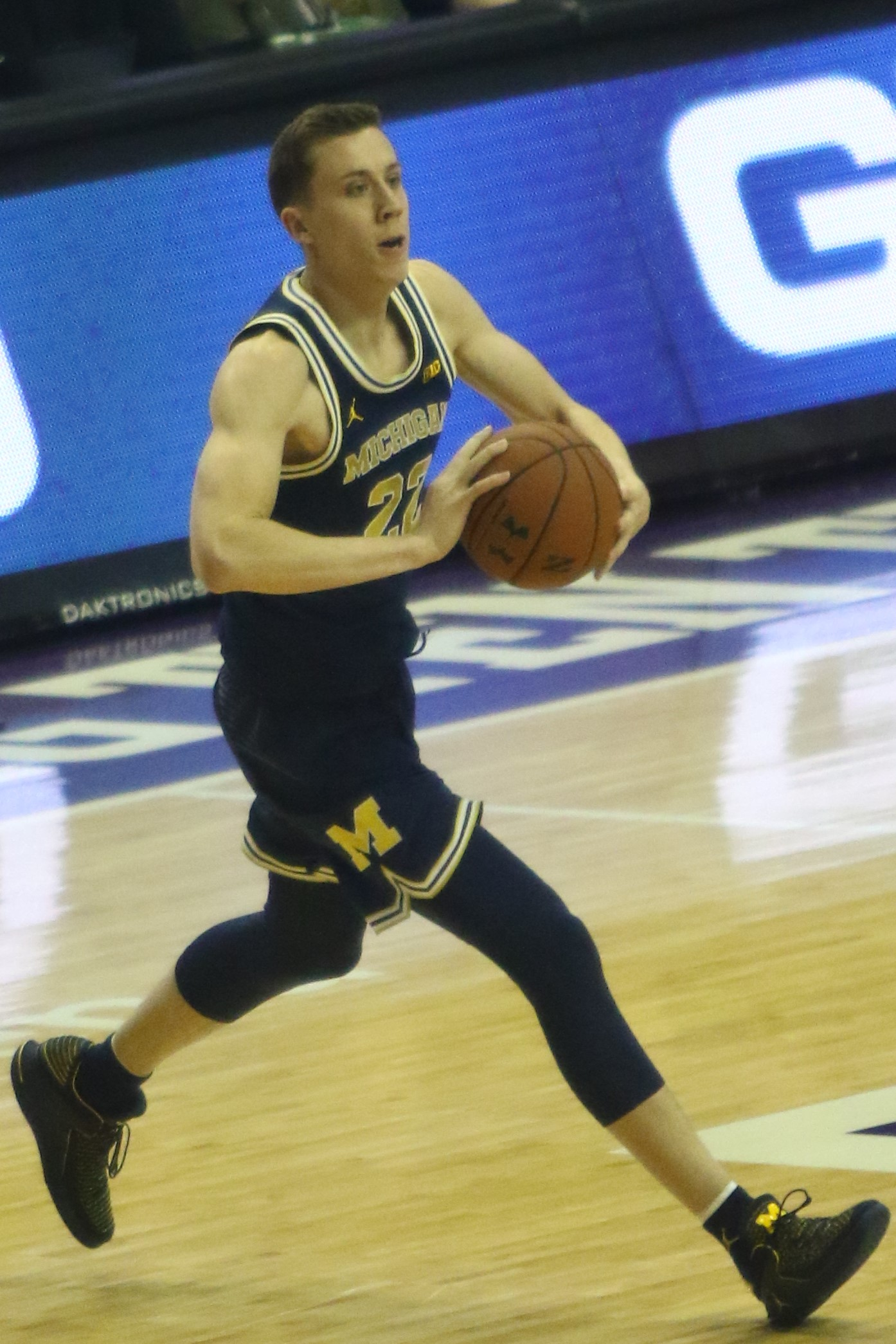
Robinson in 2018 for the 2017–18 Michigan Wolverines

Robinson began his senior season with a team-high 21 points against North Florida on November 11, 2017. In the game, he and Charles Matthews became the first Michigan teammates to score 20 points in a game since March 3, 2015. On January 13, Isaiah Livers replaced Robinson in the starting lineup for Michigan when they faced Michigan State in their rivalry game. With Livers sidelined on February 11, Robinson returned to the starting lineup, where he recorded 16 points, including 14 points in the first half in an 83–72 victory over Wisconsin. On February 14, Robinson recorded 18 points, on a season-high six three-point shots in a 74–59 victory over Iowa. With his six three-pointers in the game, Robinson surpassed Zack Novak for sixth all-time on Michigan's career three-point leaderboard with 215 for his career Following the 2017–18 Big Ten Conference regular season, Robinson was named the Big Ten Sixth Man of the Year by the coaches. On March 1 in the 2018 Big Ten Conference men's basketball tournament Robinson helped lead Michigan to a 77–71 overtime victory over Iowa after his co-captains, Wagner and Abdur-Rahkman, fouled out by converting a go-ahead three-point shot with 2:17 remaining in overtime and two free throws to give Michigan a two-possession lead with 10 seconds remaining. The following day in the quarterfinals of the Big Ten tournament Robinson scored his 1,000th career point on his second three-point field goal of the first half. Robinson finished the game with 16 points off the bench, including four three-pointers in a 77–58 victory over Nebraska. Robinson averaged 11 points per game during Michigan's four games, helping them win the tournament championship. On March 21, Robinson became an Academic All-Big Ten honoree. The team lost in the 2018 NCAA Division I Men's Basketball Championship Game to Villanova. Robinson was the first player to play in both an NCAA Division I men's basketball championship game and a Division III championship game. Since the team reached the championship games of both the Big Ten tournament and the NCAA Tournament, Robinson shares the Michigan (and NCAA) single-season games played record (41) with teammates Abdur-Rahkman, Jon Teske, Zavier Simpson and Matthews. Members of the 2010–11 Connecticut Huskies also played 41 games (an NCAA record). Over the course of three seasons, Robinson finished his career with 237 made three-point shots (on 41.9% shooting), placing fourth on Michigan's all-time list.

== Professional career ==
=== Miami Heat (2018–2025) ===
==== 2018–19 season ====
After going undrafted in the 2018 NBA draft, he signed an NBA Summer League contract with the Miami Heat. After 5 Summer League games in which he averaged 12.4 points and 2.4 rebounds while shooting 58% (22-for-38) from the field including 63% (17-for-27) on three-point shots, he agreed to a two-way contract with the Miami Heat and Sioux Falls Skyforce on July 10, 2018. When Robinson made his NBA debut, it was the first by a former Division III player since Devean George. It was the first ever by a Williams Eph. Robinson joined Big X, a team composed of former Big Ten players, in The Basketball Tournament 2018.

Although the Heat's formal training camp did not begin until September 25, 2018, Robinson declined an invitation to participate as part of the G League-manned squad that Team USA used from September 6 through September 17 to qualify for the 2019 FIBA Basketball World Cup so that he could participate in informal developmental training with the Heat. When the Heat began the season with four injured players (Wayne Ellington, Justise Winslow, James Johnson and Dion Waiters), Robinson and fellow two-way player Yante Maten made the official October 15 opening day roster. The team began the season with 14 players under full NBA contracts. When the G League training camps opened on October 22, Robinson stayed with the Heat. Robinson made his NBA debut in the Heat's fourth game of the season on October 24, against the New York Knicks with three points and four rebounds in 10 minutes of action. He made his first field goal attempt, a three-point shot. He scored 15 points as a starter when Sioux Falls opened its season on November 2 with a 112–101 victory against the Fort Wayne Mad Ants. On December 10, Robinson went 10 for 17 on 3-point shot attempts against the Agua Caliente Clippers posting 32 points, 7 rebounds and 6 assists. Robinson scored five points in his first NBA start on February 25, 2019 against the Phoenix Suns. On March 19, Robinson posted his G-League best 36 points against the Oklahoma City Blue. Robinson was a 2019 All-NBA G League Third Team selection after posting 21.4 points with a 51.4 percent field goal percentage and 48.3 three-point percentage along with 4.3 rebounds and three assists in 33 games, which resulted in his contract being converted to a standard two-year contract on April 9. Robinson established two Skyforce franchise records: Single-season three-point shots made (157), career three-point shot percentage (48.5%, min 200 attempts). The career three-point shot percentage is an NBA G-League all-time record. Robinson led the G League in minutes per game that season (36.9). Robinson closed the season with his first double-digit scoring effort with 15 points against the Brooklyn Nets on April 10.

==== 2019–20 season: Finals appearance ====
During the 2019 off-season, Robinson's contract became a $1 million guarantee with the possibility of a $1.4 million guarantee if he remained on the roster through midseason. He bulked up 15 pounds (6.8 kg) prior to the 2019–20 season. With Jimmy Butler sidelined on October 27, Robinson posted a then career-high 21 points against the Minnesota Timberwolves. He then posted 23 points on 7-for-11 three-point shooting on November 3 against the Houston Rockets. On November 20, Robinson posted a career-high 29 points against his college coach John Beilein's Cleveland Cavaliers, establishing Heat records with seven three-point shots in a quarter and eight in a half. On December 1, Robinson posted a 10-rebound/10-point double-double against the Brooklyn Nets. On December 10 (the one-year anniversary of his first professional 10 three-point shot performance), Robinson scored an NBA career-high 34 points, making 10 three-pointers, that tied a Heat franchise record for three-pointers made in a game, in a 135–121 overtime win against the Atlanta Hawks. In that game teammate Kendrick Nunn added 36 points, establishing an NBA record for points by an undrafted duo (70). Following his performance, The Wall Street Journal called Robinson "the most improbable player in the NBA" and "one of the best shooters on the planet" in an article on December 13, 2019. On December 10, 2019, with 2 three-point shots made in overtime against the Atlanta Hawks Robinson became the third Heat player to achieve multiple three point shots in an overtime in an NBA game (just two nights after Tyler Herro set the franchise record with three in an overtime. On February 12, 2020 against Utah, he posted his 200th NBA three-point shot in just his 69th career game, the fastest in NBA history, surpassing Donovan Mitchell and Luka Dončić (84 games). On February 24, 2026, Kon Knueppel achieved the feat in his 58th game, surpassing Robinson. Robinson appeared as a competitor in the Three-Point Contest at the 2020 NBA All-Star Game.

On March 4, against Orlando, Robinson posted nine three point shots (including seven in a row at one point). On March 6, 2020, Robinson scored 24 points and had five rebounds and four assists in a 110–104 loss to the New Orleans Pelicans, shooting 8-of-14 on three-pointers (giving him 17 three-point shots over consecutive games). His eight three pointers raised his single-season total to 233 with 19 games remaining, passing Wayne Ellington's single-season Heat three-pointers record (227), Damon Jones's NBA undrafted player single-season three-pointers record (225), and Kyle Korver's NBA single-season record for most by a first or second year player (226). The performance set Robinson up for two more record chases on March 8: tie with Rafer Alston for most consecutive games by a Heat player with at least one three-pointer (49) and George McCloud's NBA record largest increase in made three pointers from one season to the next (223). On March 8 against the Washington Wizards, Robinson's former roommate, Mo Wagner got Robinson's temper up enough to earn his first technical foul. In that March 8 contest, Robinson went 7 for 11 on three point shots (giving him 24 three-point shots over three consecutive games) and tied Alston with 49 consecutive games with a three-point conversion, a streak that ran for 57 (from game 16 to game 72, the last of the season). Robinson was also on pace to smash other NBA records: three-point percentage of field goals attempts (88.3 percent of Robinson's shots were threes vs. the NBA record of 82.7% by Wayne Ellington, minimum 400 attempts) and fewest two-point field goal attempts (P. J. Tucker, 136, 2400 minute minimum). He finished the COVID-shortened 2019-20 NBA season (the Heat only played 73 games) with 270 three point shots made. For the season, Robinson set several Heat franchise single-season shooting records: Effective field goal percentage (.667), True shooting percentage (.684) and two-point field goal percentage (.654). The season was notable for Robinson's high percentage while shooting a high volume of shots, which had him in select company.

Robinson debuted in his first NBA playoff game on August 18, with 2-for-8 3-point shooting for six points, three rebounds and one assist against the Indiana Pacers. On August 20, he began the game with three straight three point shots, and he tied the Heat's franchise record for most three-pointers in a playoff game (7, Mike Miller, 2012 NBA Finals), during game 2 of the first round of the 2020 NBA playoffs. He led all scorers in the game with 24 points, going 7-for-8 in three-point shooting and 3-for-3 in free throws. Robinson helped the Heat reach the 2020 NBA Finals against the Los Angeles Lakers, where he again made seven three-point shots in game 5, which broke Gary Neal's NBA Finals record for undrafted players, as Miami staved off elimination. The Heat lost in six games.

==== 2020–21 season ====
On December 25, 2020, Robinson made seven three-point shots, which tied Brandon Ingram for the NBA Christmas Day record that was equaled hours later by Kyrie Irving. This record was surpassed the next year by Patty Mills. The next day Bleacher Report posted a YouTube video showing that six of those were made in the first half, setting an NBA Christmas Day single-half record. On January 6 against the Boston Celtics, Robinson surpassed Damian Lillard and Luka Dončić (117), by posting his 300th made three-point shot in his 95th career game. On March 11, in a game against the Orlando Magic, Robinson made his 400th three point shot in his NBA-record 125th game, surpassing Trae Young (159) and Dončić (160). The Chicago Bulls snapped Robinson's franchise record 25-game streak of consecutive games with multiple three-point conversions on April 26. On May 1, 2021, in a game against the Cleveland Cavaliers, Robinson recorded his 500th career three-pointer, becoming the fastest player to reach the milestone in just 152 games, surpassing the previous record of 187 games set by Dončić. Robinson converted three-point shots in each of the final 48 games of the season (games 25 to 72).

==== 2021–22 season ====
On August 6, 2021, Robinson signed a five-year, $90 million deal to stay with the Heat, the largest contract in NBA history for an undrafted player, surpassing Fred VanVleet's 4-year/$85 million deal the year before. When VanVleet re-signed in 2023, he signed a 3-year $130 million contract. By the end of this five-year contract, Austin Reaves had pushed the undrafted player contract record to more than double Robinson's amount with a 4-year $185 million contract.

Robinson converted three-point shots in the first 21 games of the season before the Cleveland Cavaliers held him scoreless on December 1, snapping his consecutive streak at 69 games. On December 4, in a 129-103 win against the Memphis Grizzlies, Robinson recorded his 600th three-pointer, becoming the fastest player to reach the milestone, in just 184 games, surpassing the prior record made by Donovan Mitchell in 240 games. On December 31, Robinson was one of seven Heat players sidelined because of the NBA's COVID health and safety protocols. By missing his first game since April 2019, he snapped a franchise-best 182 iron man consecutive game streak (Glen Rice 174). On February 17, 2022 against the Charlotte Hornets, in his 216th game, Robinson made his 700th three-point shot, surpassing Buddy Hield's (269 games) NBA record. Through the 2021-22 NBA season, Robinson held several Heat franchise career shooting records: Effective field goal percentage (.610) and 2-point field goal percentage (.617). Late in the season, Robinson lost his starting job to Max Strus for defensive reasons.

On April 17, 2022, during Game 1 of the first round of the playoffs, Robinson scored 27 points off the bench in a 115–91 win over the Atlanta Hawks. He also hit eight three-pointers, which was a Heat franchise record for most threes made in a postseason game. Robinson tied J. R. Smith for the second most by an NBA reserve in the post season (one behind a 2011 effort by Jason Terry). Robinson was 9 for 10 from the field and 8 for 9 on three point shots. He made his last seven three point attempts (5 for 5 in the second half and 4 for 4 in the final quarter).

==== 2022–23 season: Second NBA Finals ====
On December 26, 2022, Robinson made his 800th three-pointer in his 263rd game, a 113–110 win over the Minnesota Timberwolves, becoming the fastest player in NBA history to reach 800 career three-pointers, surpassing Doncic (288). On December 30 against the Denver Nuggets, Robinson surpassed Tim Hardaway's Miami career total of 806 for the franchise record. After starting 208 games the prior three seasons, he only made one regular season start. His second start did not happen until the second game of the 2023 NBA playoffs against Milwaukee, following an injury to Tyler Herro. Victor Oladipo was lost for the season in game 3, further thinning the Heat playoff options. For most of the regular season, Robinson was not in the main rotation and he missed 20 games due to injury. However, in his return to the main rotation of the lineup, he got hot from three-point distance, making 10 of his first 13 attempts, giving him the highest percentage of all 105 NBA playoff participants with a minimum of five attempts in the first week of the playoffs. In the playoffs, Robinson passed Dwyane Wade (97) on April 22, Mario Chalmers (117) on May 19 and LeBron James (123) on May 21 to take over the Heat career playoff three-point field goal all-time lead. Robinson helped the Heat reach the 2023 NBA Finals, but the Heat lost the series in five games to the Denver Nuggets.

==== 2023–24 season ====
On December 16, 2023, in his 305th NBA game, against the Chicago Bulls, Robinson broke the record shared by Doncic and Hield of 324 games played to achieve 900 career made three point shots. On February 26 when six Heat players were unavailable due to injury or suspension, Robinson had an off shooting night (1–11 FG, 0–6 3FG), but contributed to a win over the Sacramento Kings, with a career-high 11 assists, surpassing the nine assists he posted in Game 5 of the Eastern Conference Finals of the 2023 NBA playoffs against the Boston Celtics. His previous regular season high was 7 assists on March 3, 2022 against the Brooklyn Nets. On March 17, Robinson scored a season-high 30 points, including his 1000th career three point shot in his 343rd career game, becoming the then fastest player in NBA history to reach 1,000 career three-pointers and breaking the previous record of 350 games by Hield.

=== Detroit Pistons (2025–present) ===
On July 7, 2025, Robinson signed a three-year, $48 million contract with the Detroit Pistons via a sign-and-trade with the Heat in exchange for Simone Fontecchio. The 2025–26 Pistons earned the No. 1 seed in the Eastern Conference for the first time since 2007. Their 60–22 finish was the third-best regular season record in franchise history and their first 60-win season since 2005–06. Robinson had his best season since his first full season 2019–20 averaging 12.2 points per game on 41.0% three point shooting in the regular season and 58.8% in the postseason. Robinson started the 2026-27 NBA season on a hot streak, tying Luka Doncic for the league lead in made threes (15) through 3 games and with the highest percentage (53.6%) of made threes in the league of players who made at least 10 in through games of October 25.

== Career statistics ==
Legend
GP	Games played	GS	Games started	MPG	Minutes per game
FG%	Field goal percentage	3P%	3-point field goal percentage	FT%	Free throw percentage
RPG	Rebounds per game	APG	Assists per game	SPG	Steals per game
BPG	Blocks per game	PPG	Points per game	**Bold**	Career high
*	Led the league

=== NBA ===
==== Regular season ====
Year	Team	GP	GS	MPG	FG%	3P%	FT%	RPG	APG	SPG	BPG	PPG
2018–19	Miami	15	1	10.7	.391	.284	.667	1.3	.3	.3	.0	3.3
2019–20	Miami	73	68	29.7	**.470**	**.446**	**.931**	3.2	1.4	.5	**.3**	**13.5**
2020–21	Miami	72*	72*	**31.4**	.439	.408	.827	**3.5**	1.8	.6	**.3**	13.1
2021–22	Miami	**79**	68	25.9	.399	.372	.836	2.6	1.6	.5	.2	10.9
2022–23	Miami	42	1	16.4	.371	.328	.906	1.6	1.1	.3	.0	6.4
2023–24	Miami	68	36	28.0	.450	.395	.889	2.5	**2.8**	**.7**	.2	12.9
2024–25	Miami	74	37	24.1	.437	.393	.887	2.3	2.4	.5	.1	11.0
2025–26	Detroit	77	**77**	27.4	.456	.410	.755	2.7	2.1	.6	**.3**	12.2
Career		500	360	26.3	.437	.399	.848	2.6	1.9	.5	.2	11.5

==== Playoffs ====
Year	Team	GP	GS	MPG	FG%	3P%	FT%	RPG	APG	SPG	BPG	PPG
2020	Miami	21	**21**	28.6	.426	.397	.868	**2.8**	1.8	.7	**.3**	11.7
2021	Miami	4	4	25.0	.379	.370	**.900**	**2.8**	.8	.8	**.3**	10.3
2022	Miami	13	0	12.2	.439	.383	.833	1.8	.4	.3	.1	5.6
2023	Miami	**23**	1	18.2	**.475**	.442	.875	1.5	1.7	.3	.1	9.0
2024	Miami	5	0	12.0	.313	.231	—	1.0	1.2	.4	.0	2.6
2025	Miami	4	0	14.8	.357	.333	.750	1.0	.3	.0	.0	4.3
2026	Detroit	13	11	**29.5**	.447	**.456**	.611	2.4	**2.3**	**1.3**	.2	**11.8**
Career		83	37	21.4	.436	.410	.810	2.0	1.5	.6	.2	9.0

=== College ===
==== Division I ====
Year	Team	GP	GS	MPG	FG%	3P%	FT%	RPG	APG	SPG	BPG	PPG
2015–16	Michigan	36	**27**	**28.9**	.457	**.450**	.886	**3.5**	**1.8**	0.6	0.2	**11.2**
2016–17	Michigan	38	3	20.1	**.470**	.424	.781	1.7	0.9	0.4	0.2	7.7
2017–18	Michigan	**41***	19	25.8	.440	.384	**.891**	2.4	1.1	**0.7**	**0.4**	9.2
Career		115	49	24.9	.455	.419	.864	2.5	1.2	0.6	0.3	9.3

==== Division III ====
Year	Team	GP	GS	MPG	FG%	3P%	FT%	RPG	APG	SPG	BPG	PPG
2013–14	Williams	32	31	34.7	.557	.453	.878	6.5	1.8	1.1	1.2	17.1
Career		32	31	34.7	.557	.453	.878	6.5	1.8	1.1	1.2	17.1

== Records ==
=== NBA ===
- Fastest player to reach 300 career 3-pointers (95 games)
- Fastest player to reach 400 career 3-pointers (125 games)
- Fastest player to reach 500 career 3-pointers (152 games)
- Fastest player to reach 600 career 3-pointers (184 games)
- Fastest player to reach 700 career 3-pointers (216 games)
- Fastest player to reach 800 career 3-pointers (263 games)
- Fastest player to reach 900 career 3-pointers (305 games)
- Fastest player to reach 1000 career 3-pointers (343 games)
- Single-season 3-pointers by an undrafted player (270)
- Single-season 3-pointers by a 2nd year player (270)
- Season to season increase in 3-pointers (260, 10 to 270)
- Single-season 3-point percentage of field goals attempts (3PA/FGA, 606/687=88.2%)
- Single-game undrafted duo points (70, 36 by Kendrick Nunn)
- Single-NBA Finals game 3-point shots made by an undrafted player (7)
- Single-NBA Christmas Day half 3-point shots made (6, tied)
- Kaseya Center single-game 3-point shots made (10, tied Tim Hardaway Jr., Paul George and J. R. Smith)

=== Miami Heat ===
==== Regular season ====
- Most 3-point shots made in a quarter (7)
- Most 3-point shots made in a half (8)
- Most 3-point shots made in a game (10; tied with Mario Chalmers and Brian Shaw)
- Most 3-point shots made in a season (270)
- Most 3-point shots made in a career (1202)
- Consecutive games played (182)
- Consecutive regular season games with 3-point shot conversion (69, 2/11/21-11/29/21)
- Consecutive games within a season with 3-point shot conversion (57, 11/25/19-8/12/20)
- Consecutive regular season games with multiple 3-point shot conversion (25, 3/11/21-4/24/21)
- Single-season Effective field goal percentage (.667)
- Single-season True shooting percentage (.684)
- Single-season 2-point field goal percentage (.654)
- Career Effective field goal percentage (.597, through 23–24 season)
- Career 2-point field goal percentage (.598, through 23–24 season)
- Seasons with 200 3-point shots made (3)
- Seasons with 250 3-point shots made (2)

==== Playoffs ====
- Most 3-point shots made in a playoff game quarter (4, 9/17/20, 4/17/22, 5/23/22, 4/19/23), tied with several including Damon Jones (4/25/2005), Dwyane Wade (4/25/10), Tyler Herro (9/19/2020), Max Strus (6/4/2023) and Luol Deng (4/23/2016), possibly others before 2015 playoffs.
- Most 3-point shots made in a playoff game quarter without a miss (4, 4/17/22), tied with several including Damon Jones 2005 EC1stRG1 4/25/2005, Dwyane Wade (4/25/10), Luol Deng (4/23/2016).
- Most 3-point shots made in a playoff game half (5, 4/17/22 & 10/9/2020), tied Tim Hardaway, (4/26/96) and Dwyane Wade (4/20/10 & 4/25/10).
- Most 3-point shots made in a playoff game half without a miss (5, 4/17/22), tied Dwyane Wade (4/25/10) and possibly Tim Hardaway (4/26/96)
- Most 3-point shots made in a playoff game (8, 4/17/22)
- Most 3-point shots made in a single-postseason (62, 2020)
- Most 3-point shots made in a career (143, through 5/2/2024)
- Consecutive 3-point shots made in a playoff game (7, 4/17/22) (Note: Robinson made his first three, missed his second and made 7 in a row. The only other Heat to have made 7 total 3s in a playoff game are Damon Jones 2005 EC1stRG1 4/25/2005 and Mike Miller 2012 FG5 6/21/2012. Not an NBA record. Among the 17 9+ 3-point playoff efforts before May 20, 2023, Vince Carter made his first 8 in a 9/13 effort ECSFG3 May 11, 2001. None of other 16 had even made 7 in a row. There were 32 other players who had made 8 in a game who could have also made 7 or 8 in a row. Robert Horry stands alone with the NBA playoff record for shots made without a miss at 7.)

==== NBA Finals ====
- Most 3-point shots made in an NBA Finals half (5, 10/9/2020)
- Most 3-point shots made in an NBA Finals game (7, 10/9/2020, tied with Mike Miller, 6/21/2012)
- Most 3-point shots made in an NBA Finals series (18, 2020)

=== G League ===
- Career 3-point shot percentage (48.3%)

=== Sioux Falls ===
- Single-season 3-point shots made (157)

=== NCAA DI ===
- Single-season games played (41, shared with several 2017–18 Wolverines teammates, 2023–24 NC State Wolfpack and 2010–11 Connecticut Huskies)

=== Michigan ===
- Single ACC/B1G Challenge game 3-point shooting percentage (5–7=71.4%, min 5 attempts)

=== Williams ===
- Single-season minutes played (1110)
- Freshman-season points (548)

== Personal life ==
Robinson's older brother, Eli, died by suicide in 2025 after a schizophrenia diagnosis. Robinson and his family launched the Robinson Family Foundation to help others deal with mental health issues.

== Podcasting career ==
In 2021, Duncan started a podcast called "The Long Shot Pod" with his friend Davis Reid. Produced by the podcasting company, ThreeFourTwo Productions owned by former NBA player JJ Redick, each podcast features exclusive conversations between Duncan Robinson and his co-host Davis Reid, sometimes with NBA players as well as celebrities from other areas of media. The podcast has a total of 8 million views on YouTube.

== See also ==
- List of NBA single-season 3-point scoring leaders
- Michigan Wolverines men's basketball statistical leaders
