= Crust (film) =

2023 German short film

- German: Kruste
- Directed by: Jens Kevin Georg
- Written by: Jens Kevin Georg
- Produced by: Fritzie Benesch; Charlotte Jülide Hansen
- Starring: Philip Kapell; Luise Landau; Sven Hönig; Heinz Wanitschek
- Production companies: Filmuniversity Babelsberg KONRAD WOLF; ZDF; 3sat
- Release date: 2023
- Running time: 26 minutes
- Country: Germany
- Language: German

Crust (German: Kruste) is a 2023 German short film written and directed by Jens Kevin Georg. The 26-minute film about familial expectations has been awarded in various international film festivals, including Odense International Film Festival and Indy Shorts International Film Festival. The film also received a Silver Student Academy Award at the 2024 Student Academy Award Ceremony. It was shortlisted for the Best Live Action Short Film category at the 97th Academy Awards.

== Plot ==
12-year-old Fabi feels compelled to prove himself as a true member of his family by acquiring his first scar—a rite of passage upheld by his father and grandfather. Fabi's younger sister, Bea, has already met this expectation, intensifying his sense of urgency and inadequacy.

== Release ==
Since its release, the film has been selected in various festivals around the world:

Year	Festivals	Awards	Status
2024	Student Academy Award	Silver Award for Best Narrative	Won
2024	Odense International Film Festival	Best International Short Award	Won
2024	Indy Shorts International Film Festival	Best Narrative Prize	Won
2024	Izmir Short Film Festival	International Competition	Won
2024	Bolton International Film Festival	Best Short Film	Nominated
2024	Dallas International Film Festival	Best Student Short	Won
