= L'est Films Group =

Chinese Movie Production and Distribution Company

L'Est Films Group
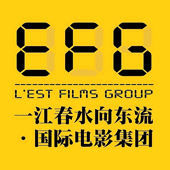
- Industry: Movie distribution and production
- Founded: 2008
- Headquarters: Beijing
- Key people: Chen Zhi-heng
- Products: The Search, Court House on Horseback, A North Chinese Girl
- Website: English site Chinese site

L'Est Films Group Int'l Co (EFG) is an entertainment industry company involved in movie distribution and production.

== History ==
The company was founded by Chen Zhi-heng in 2008, who was selected as the Chinese cinema programmer of the Venice Film Festival in 2009. Before the company was officially registered, Chen had already distributed several movies in France under the name of L'est Films Group. The main activity of EFG includes movie production and distribution. Many well-known directors such as Wen Hai, Wan Ma-Cai-Dan and Zou Peng share partnerships with EFG. The movie Court House on the Horseback, directed by Liu Jie, which won the Best Feature Film Award in the Horizon Section of the 63rd Venice International Film Festival, was distributed by Chen in 2006.

- In March 2010, EFG co-produced the French movie China Shalom with the French director Emmanuel Sapolsky.
- In February 2010, EFG co-operated with the French media company Le Don Films to make a movie styled series, officially entering into the TV market.
- In August 2009, a new branch in Malaysia was opened to explore the market in Southeast Asia.
- From December 2009, EFG not only distributes Chinese movies abroad, but movies in India, U.S.A., Japan and France as well.
- In 2009, the movie Reconstructing Faith by Wen Hai was co-produced with the French company Films d'ici.
- In early 2009, EFG moved into both movie production and distribution fields.
- In August 2008, the first work of EFG, Wo men (We), received a special mention in the "Horizons - 'Premio orizzonti'" section at the 65th Venice International Film Festival.
- In 2008, Chen founded L'Est Films Group in Hong Kong.

== Awards ==
- 2004: The Grassland, 3rd International Student Film & Video Festival of Beijing Film Academy, Award for Best Short Film of Chinese students
- 2005: MAMA, 4th International Student Film & Video Festival of Beijing Film Academy, Best Asian Student Work
- 2005: The Silent Holy Stone, 24th Vancouver International Film Festival, Dragons & Tigers Award Jury Special Mentions
- 2005: Floating Dust, 16th Festival international du documentaire de Marseille, Georges de Beauregard Prize
- 2006: Court House on the Horseback, 63rd Venice International Film Festival, Best Feature Film Award
- 2006: The Silent Holy Stone, 9th Shanghai International Film Festival Asian new unit, Best Director Award
- 2006: MAMA, 11th Tel Aviv International Student Film Festival, Special Mention
- 2006: MAMA, 2006 Busan Asian Short Film Festival, Apple Korea Award
- 2006: Dream Walking, 28th Cinéma du Réel documentary film festival Jury Prize
- 2008: Duck & Goose, 5th Japan Con-Can Movie Festival, Special Mention Award
- 2008: We, 65th Venice Film Festival Venice, Special Mention
- 2009: The Search, Bangkok International Film Festival 2009, Golden Kinnaree Awards The Special July Prize
- 2009: No Country for Chicken, 62nd Locarno International Film Festival, Film and Video Subtitling Prize
- 2009: Red River, 3rd Chungmuro International Film Festival in Seoul, Best Film Award
- 2009: Cucumber, Cinema Digital Seoul 2009 Film Festival, Movie Collage Award
- 2009: The Search, 12th Shanghai International Film Festival, Jury Prize
- 2009: Painted Skin, 28th Hong Kong Film Awards, Best Cinematography & Best Original Film Song
- 2009: A North Chinese Girl, 33rd Hong Kong International Film Festival, FIPRESCI Award
- 2010: The High Life, 34th Hong Kong International Film Festival, the Silver Digital Award and the |FIPRESCI Award

== Distribution ==
2001

- Miss Jinxing by Zhang Yuan
- Beijing Suburb by Hu Ze

2002

- I Love You by Zhang Yuan
- Jiang Jie by Zhang Yuan

2003

- Green Tea by Zhang Yuan
- Floating Dust by Wen Hai
- In The Military Training Camp by Wen Hai

2004

- The Grassland by Wan Ma-Cai-Can/Pema Tseden

2005

- 200420 by Wang Ao-fei
- MAMA by Li Jia

2007

- Glass Eye by Xu Yi-liang
- The Silent Holy Stone by Wan Ma-Cai-Dan/Pema Tseden
- Magellan by Li Jun-hua, Hyojeong Kim, Dubianhongwen
- Duck & Goose by Bai Zhi-xun
- Sunshine on her Shoulders by Zeng Xiao-xiao
- Flower Seeds by Wei A-ting
- 73006 by Wang Ao-fei
- Court House on the Horseback by Liu Jie
- Brave Heart by Ye Kai

2008

- Cucumber by Zhou Yao-wu
- Red River by Zhang Jia-rui
- Innocent as I was by Xiao Xiao
- Secret Tunnel by Xi Xue-qing
- Dream Walking by Wen Hai
- We by Wen Hai
- The Search Wan Ma-Cai-Dan/Pema Tseden
- Karma by Wang Ming
- Monologue by Wang Ao-fei
- Yonder Land by Tian Li
- Twilight Dancing by Shu Ya
- Get on the Way by Jin Li-peng
- No country for chicken by Huang Zhen
- A piece of sound advice by Gilles Charmant
- Painted Skin by Chen Jia-shang

2009

- Legend of the Tang Empire by Jin Tie-mu
- The Story of 3 Ports by Li Jun-hua, Hyojeong Kim, Dubianhongwen

2010

- Take Out by Sean Baker, Shih-Ching Tsou
- Monologue by Wang Ao-fei
- 200420 by Wang Ao-fei
- 73006 by Wang Ao-fei
- A Piece of Sound Advice by Gilles Charmant

2011

- Repair by WANG Zi-zhao
- Ancient Capital by Li Ji
- Born in Beijing by Zhang Tian-hui

== Production ==
2003

- Die Other Where by Chen Zhi-heng
- Genica by Chen Zhi-heng

2004

- The Belgian Chocolate by Chen Zhi-heng

2009

- A North Chinese Girl by Zou Peng
- By the River by Yan Wen-xin
- Crust by Wen Hai

2010

- The High Life by Zhao Da-yong
- Linin by Wen Hai
- Reconstructing Faith by Wen Hai

2011

- A Cruelties of Youth by Mao Mao
- Empty Nest by Yan Wen-xin
- Rain or Shine by Ariane Doublet, Wen Hai

== Programmed film festival ==
- Doclisboa 2008 - Made in China, 16–26 October 2008
- Barcelona, Chinese City: Does Beijing still exist?, 14–31 January 2009
- 14^{ème} Édition des Rencontres du Cinéma Documentaire, 6–13 June 2009
