= Bon Appétit (disambiguation) =

Bon Appétit is an American food and entertaining magazine.

Bon Appétit may also refer to:

== Businesses ==
- Bon Appétit (restaurant), Malahide, Ireland
- Bon Appétit Management Company, an American restaurant company

== Film and television ==
- Bon Appétit (film), a 2010 romantic drama by David Pinillos
- Bon Appetit! (TV series) or Gochisōsan, a Japanese drama series

== Music ==
- Bon Appetit (album), an album by O.C., or the title song
- "Bon Appétit" (song), a song by Katy Perry

== Video games ==
- Cooking Mama 5: Bon Appétit!, a cookery simulation game
- Senran Kagura: Bon Appétit!, a rhythm cooking game

== See also ==
- Bone-Appetit!, an album by T-Bone
