= Aura Films =

British film production company

Aura Films Ltd
- Company type: Private
- Founded: 2011
- Headquarters: Colchester, {{{location_country}}}
- Founders: Steven Dorrington, Tristan Syrett
- Industry: production company
- Website: aurafilms.co.uk
- Current status: Active

Aura Films Ltd is a British film production company based in Colchester, Essex. Their work has been screened on numerous TV channels and film festivals around the world. The company was founded in 2011 by filmmakers Steven Dorrington and Tristan Syrett.

== Filmography ==
Year	Title	Screenings/Awards
2017	School of Shock	Best Comedy: 300 Second Film Festival; Best Comedy: Canada's Yes! Let's Make a Movie Film Festival; Best Comedy: Norfolk Film Festival; Best Comedy: Tijuana Film And Food Festival; Best Mini Short: Chelmsford Film Festival (Best Mini Short); People's Choice Award: Autumn Shorts Film Festival; Semi Finalist: Sguardi European Independent Short Film Night; Official Selection: Abuja International Film Festival; Official Selection: AM Egypt Film Festival; Official Selection: Cardiff International Film Festival; Official Selection: Harrogate Film Festival; Official Selection: Hastings Fringe; Official Selection: II Minsk International Short Film Festival Kinosmena; Official Selection: Kaohsiung Film Festival; Official Selection: Nottingham Micro Film Festival; Official Selection: Salento Finibus Film Festival; Official Selection: Short Form Film Festival; Official Selection: XpoNorth Film Festival
2014	A Fish Called Keith	Best Film: Eastleigh Film Festival; Best Editor: Dieciminuti Film Festival; Best Newcomer: (Hannah Brint) Freedom Film Festival; Best Film Runner Up: Bournemouth Film Festival; Best Film Runner-up: Winchester Film Festival; Nominated for Best Film & Best Director: Thurrock Film Festival; Three Cities Film Festival: Official Selection; Lahore International Children's Film Festival: Official Selection; Big Sur Film Festival: Official Selection; Official Selection: Aakruti-My Creation International Film Festival; Official Selection: All American Drive-In Film Festival; Official Selection: Autumn Shorts Film Festival 2014; Official Selection: Bangladesh International Children's Film Festival; Official Selection: Bournemouth Film Festival; Official Selection: Caselle Film Festival; Official Selection: Century Shorts Film Festival; Official Selection: Cineshift Film Festival; Official Selection: Cluj International Comedy Film Festival; Official Selection: CMS Children's International Film Festival; Official Selection: Courts des Iles Film Festival; Official Selection: Davis International Film Festival; Official Selection: Dieciminuti Film Festival; Official Selection: Dytiatko International Children's Television Festival; Official Selection: Eastern NC Film Festival; Official Selection: Eastleigh Film Festival; Official Selection: Enumclaw Music & Arts Festival; Official Selection: Figari Film Festival; Official Selection: Flagstaff Mountain Film Festival; Official Selection: Freedom Film Festival; Official Selection: Fuencaliente Rural FilmFest; Official Selection: HALF (Haiku Amateur Little Film) Festival; Official Selection: Heathcote Film Festival; Official Selection: Indieburgh Film Festival; Official Selection: IndieFlicks International Short Film Screening; Official Selection: Landed Film Festival; Official Selection: Lviv International Short Film Festival Wiz-Art; Official Selection: Malta Short Film Festival; Official Selection: Nightpiece Film Festival 2015; Official Selection: Ningbo Microfilm Festival; Official Selection: Non Stop Film Festival; Official Selection: Nottingham International Microfilm Festival; Official Selection: Odisha International Film Festival; Official Selection: Ozark Shorts; Official Selection: Parachute Light Zero Act II Film Festival; Official Selection: Portobello Film Festival; Official Selection: Red Hook Film Festival; Official Selection: Root Film Festival "Zero" Edition; Official Selection: Sharjah International Children's Film Festival 2015; Official Selection: Shepparton Shorts Film Festival; Official Selection: Siliguri International Short Film & Documentary Festival; Official Selection: Sirius Film Festival; Official Selection: Southampton Film Week; Official Selection: Tabletop Magi Film Festival; Official Selection: The Box Film Festival; Official Selection: The Quarantine Film Festival; Official Selection: Thomas Meighan Film Festival; Official Selection: Thurrock Film Festival; Official Selection: Tumbleweeds Film Festival; Official Selection: Visionaria Film Festival; Official Selection: Winchester Film Festival
2012	Eyes Wide Open	Top 20: 15 Second Horror Film Challenge; Official Selection: Zompire The Undead Film Festival; Official Selection: Horror-On-Sea Film Festival; Official Selection: Wasteland Film Festival; Official Selection: Raindance Halloween Horror Competition; Official Selection: Umbertidead – Horror & Sci-Fi festival; Official Selection: Life, Death and Zombies Film Festival; Official Selection: Horrorvision Trash Film Festival; Official Selection: NowOrNever International Film Festival; Official Selection: Fright Night Theatre; Official Selection: Horror Online Art Film Festival of Navarra; Official Selection: Calgary Horror Con; Official Selection: Four4 Film Festival; Official Selection: Nottingham International Microfilm Festival; Official Selection: Dead in Decatur; Official Selection: Fear in the Fens
2011	Toothless	Nominate Best Film: Cannes in a Van; Nominated Best Actress: Cannes in a Van Film Festival; Nominated Best Screenplay: Cannes in a Van Film Festival; Best Film: Strawberry Shorts Film Festival; Best Actress: Strawberry Shorts Film Festival; Nominated Best Film: Braine Hownd Film Festival; Nominated Best Director: Braine Hownd Film Festival; Best Actress: Braine Hownd Film Festival; Nominated Best Screenplay: Braine Hownd Film Festival; Official Selection: Arizona State Museum Film Festival; Official Selection: Blue Print Review Film Festival; Official Selection: Boomtown Film and Music Festival; Official Selection: British Shorts Film Festival; Official Selection: Feast on Film; Official Selection: Hacknee Productions Film Festival; Official Selection: Islington Exhibitions Film Festival; Official Selection: Jammy Hurricane Ickle Film Festival; Official Selection: Life Just is Film; Official Selection: MovieBar Film Festival; Official Selection: Moving Image Film Festival; Official Selection: Northern Nights Film Festival; Official Selection: Odd's Mini Picture Show; Official Selection: Portobello Film Festival; Official Selection: Queer as Film; Official Selection: Rotorreliefs Film Festival; Official Selection: Screenings at the Antelope; Official Selection: Stortford Film Festival; Official Selection: Takes Film Festival; Official Selection: Tiny Dog Productions Film Festival; Official Selection: Tromadance Film Festival; Official Selection: Vibe Gallery Film Festival; Official Selection: Walthamstow Film Festival; Official Selection: Whirlygig Film Festival; Official Selection: Writers' Ink Film Festival
