= Gnome Motion Picture Company =

American film production company

- Type: Private
- Industry: Film studio
- Founded: 1910
- Defunct: 1911 (presumed)
- Fate: Closed
- Headquarters: The Bronx, New York City, New York
- Key people: Frederick Kalmbach, Mildred Hutchinson

The Gnome Motion Picture Company was a film production company that is credited with three productions between 1910 and 1911. The purpose of the company was to produce stories about gnomes. Alice in Funnyland, The Birth of the Gnomes and Alice's New Year's Party were all productions that were most likely never released. Announcements in trade publications ceased in January 1911 and the company treasurer, Frederick Kalmbach, was later sued by the City of New York for taxes. Of the three planned productions, two official synopses were released in The Nickelodeon. Despite no evidence of an actual release, the American Film Institute still recognizes all three films as being released in January 1911.

== History ==
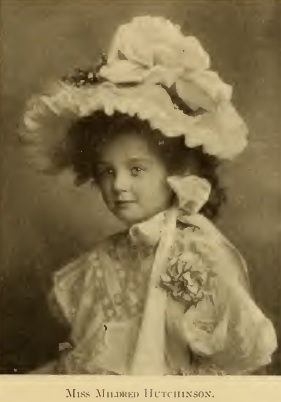
Mildred Hutchinson in a photo circa 1910.

According to The Nickelodeon the "Gnome Motion Picture Company was formed to manufacture pictures under the Meredith-Jones camera patents, now owned and controlled, together with several other patents, by the Animated Picture Patents Company." The company's incorporation announcement stated it had $30,000 in capital and its directors were Frederick Kalmbach, James C. Hutchinson and H. Meredith Jones. The studio and offices were located at the southwest corner of Park and Tremont Ave in Bronx, New York City, New York. According to a report, Gnome purchased a Motiograph Moving Picture Machine and Hallberg's Standard Automatic Electric Economizers for their productions.

The company's lead actress was Mildred Hutchinson and employed its staff to produce stories about fictional gnomes, specifically for child audiences. Hutchinson was a seasoned child actress at the time of the productions who had credits working with Edison, Vitagraph and Melies the age of six. Records surrounding the release suggest that Alice in Funnyland, The Birth of the Gnomes and Alice's New Year's Party were never released. The venture ultimately failed and the City of New York sued Frederick Kalmbach, the company treasurer, for unpaid taxes on an assessment of $3,000. Kalmbach said that the Gnome Motion Picture Company was no longer conducting business when the assessment was made and the case was dismissed by the judge in 1918. The last record of the Gnome Motion Picture Company in trade publications, in both announcements and advertisements, comes from a January 14 issue of Moving Picture World which announces all three of the films would be delayed for a "few days". The American Film Institute still identifies all three films as having been released in January 1911 by Gnome.

The Moving Picture World's Thomas Bedding provided the best recognition of the company. Bedding wrote, "The Gnome Company seem to be working on, what to our minds, is the most interesting phase of the Christmas sentiment. They are making fairy pictures for young people. We fully expect to see other makers follow suit, when they realize what the real Christmas sentiment is, namely one of lightness, brightness, joyousness." Advertisements for the productions show the great desire of the company to produce the three films in the December 1910 season, but interest in the Christmas and New Year's productions would have waned by mid-January 1911 with the productions still not released. Ultimately, the Gnome Motion Picture Company represents an early attempt to cater film productions to children and during the Christmas season.

== Films ==
=== The Birth of the Gnomes ===
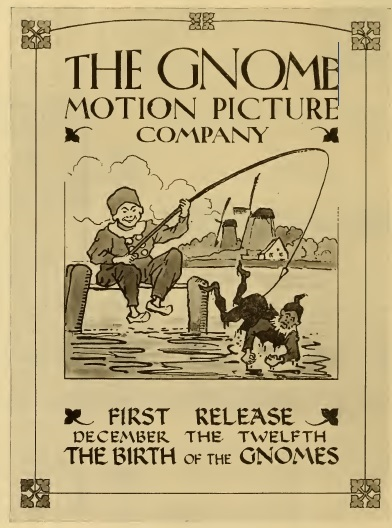
An advertisement for The Birth of the Gnomes.

A published synopsis in The Nickelodeon reads as follows, "An old fairy realizing that her span of life is rapidly drawing to a close, brings to life a new race of people, called the Gnomes, who are governed by a new fairy. When the Gnomes appear, the old fairy informs them that their duties will be to perform acts of kindness to all people of the world. After thus admonishing them, the old fairy disappears, and the Gnomes start upon their career of well doing. Many beautiful acts of kindness are performed in the course of their travels, which is through wonderful scenery and in strange places. In one scene the Gnomes discover an old man bemoaning his fate, and him they magically transform to a youth of great beauty. Many other acts of kindness are performed, all of great interest. Finally, the band of Gnomes discover a balloon, and the fairy queen being helped into the basket by the Gnomes, is last seen flying away watched by her adoring subjects." The film was billed at being 1000 feet in length and having a set release for December 12, 1910. Though an announcement stated that the release would be delayed to "Christmas week". No release was ever confirmed in any trade publication after it was delayed into January 1911.

=== Alice in Funnyland ===
A published synopsis in The Nickelodeon reads as follows, "The night before Christmas, Alice, a child of wealth, after going through the usual form of hanging up her stocking, is put to bed by her maid. Alice falls asleep and dreams. Enter Santa Claus and Gnomes who tell Alice to follow her and they will show her part of their Funnyland. Alice follows the little people under the special protection of a policeman two foot high. The little party are seen trotting through beautiful glens and dales until they reach Funnyland. Santa Claus tells her that if she is a good girl all the animals and toys here are hers; as Alice touches each one they come to life. The teddy bear steps out to dance with Alice. As Alice removes the cover from Doll's box the doll dances out, a little king gives a magical entertainment, a clown is very active and all the animals and dolls do some interesting act much to the surprise and delight of little Alice. At last, tired out, Alice falls asleep reclining upon the shoulders of Teddy bear. Then we see her again back in her own little bed. It is now Christmas morning. Her maid awakens and dresses her for the great event, takes her to the drawing room where she is welcomed by her parents to find that her dream has come true." Originally the film was billed as being released for December 19, 1910 and then it was later claimed to be December 26, 1910. This release was attributed in an issue of The Nickelodeon. However, the film was not released on December 19 because an advertisement in Moving Picture World in January 1911 said that the release would be delayed for a "few days". It is unknown, and unlikely, if the film actually was released because no other publications, ads or materials surrounding the Gnome Motion Picture Company followed.

=== Alice's New Year's Party ===
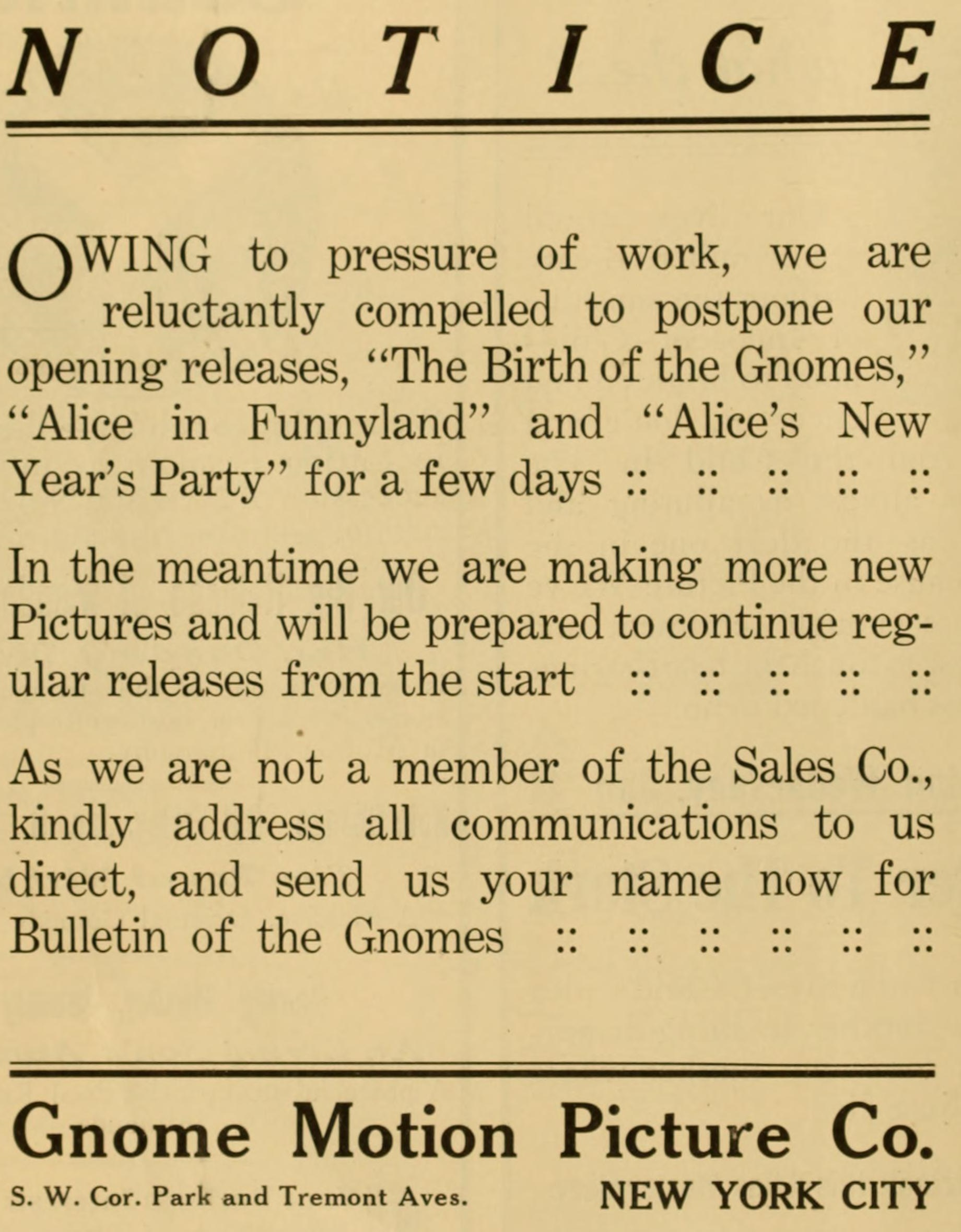
Gnome Motion Picture Company announcing the delay of the releases in January 1911. The works were not released.

Unlike the first two productions which were the subject of published synopses, Alice's New Year's Party was the subject of no detail in trade publications. This production was never given an exact release date, but was later affirmed to be set for a "Christmas week" release. The American Film Institute cites four bibliographic sources ending with an advertisement in Moving Picture World in January 1911 says that the releases would be delayed for a "few days". The film does not appear to have ever been released.
