= Seen by Scene Communications =

Seen-by-Scene Communications
- Founded: 1947; 79 years ago
- Founder: Paul Spencer Karr
- Headquarters: Utah, United States
- Website: seenbyscene.com

Seen-by-Scene Communications is a motion picture production company and marketing firm.

The firm was formed in 1947 by Paul Spencer Karr, (1925–1999) who was a producer for NBC in the early days of television, and was the producer for Paul Harvey when his show was broadcast from Utah. Karr also worked with Bill Keene on the Family Circus comic strip.

Seen-by-Scene produces commercial, documentary and feature films and is an Emmy recipient. The company was a principal in many high speed photo instrumentation projects for the United States government, doing top-secret work for the National Security Agency, the Department of Defense, and all branches of the United States Armed Forces. The company did initial testing for the Minuteman Missile program and NASA on the Space Shuttle program. The company is located in Utah and is reported in the American Cinematographer.
