= Bleeding Art Industries =

Entertainment production company

Bleeding Art Industries Inc.
- Company type: Private
- Industry: Special Effects
- Founded: 2002
- Headquarters: Calgary, Alberta, Canada
- Owner: Leo Wieser, Becky Scott
- Website: www.bleedingartindustries.com

Bleeding Art Industries is an entertainment production company focused on creative content production, special effects, custom fabrication, product sales, and equipment rentals. It is based out of Calgary, Canada. The company is known for its work in the film, television, performing arts, themed exhibit, military simulation, and live event industries. Bleeding Art Industries was founded by Leo Wieser in 2002.

== History ==
Founded in late 1994 as a sole proprietorship and incorporated in 2002, Bleeding Art Industries (BAI) originally focused on theatrical design work, with Founder Leo Wieser working as a contractor, designing costumes, sets, and lighting for theatre and performing arts companies across Canada, and touring worldwide with puppeteer Ronnie Burkett. After working for a local pyrotechnics company, where he designed and implemented pyro displays, Wieser began doing mechanical special effects for films. BAI has since specialized primarily in special effects including pyrotechnics and other atmospheric effects, and has expanded over the years into providing creature and character effects, themed exhibits, custom props, and sculptures. The company also has a sales and rentals division, selling film production supplies, special effects make-up, and selling and renting special effects equipment. It manufactures and sells its own line of bloods, gelatin and gelatin appliances, snow, and other special effects make-up products. BAI has established itself as a high quality provider of special effects services and expendables for the Canadian market. The company began a production division around 2010 under which it creates and produces its own content. Its first film - Skeleton Girl - is the first Canadian film shot in stereoscopic 3D and stop motion animation. It premiered in New York in April 2012. It also worked with Insurrection Films on the film The Hunt, designing and building two creatures for the short horror film, also currently on the festival circuit.

== Credits ==
=== Films ===
- 2015 The River (creation and production, music credit: The Arrogant Worms, River of Snot)
- 2013 Cut Bank (special effects)
- 2013 One Hit Die (goblin make-up)
- 2013 The Hunt (special effects, creature design and fabrication)
- 2012 Twisted Tales for Demented Children (full creation and production)
- 2010 The Last Rites of Ransom Pride (special effects)
- 2009 Screamers: The Hunting (special effects)
- 2009 Creepy Jesus (prop maker)
- 2008 Flirting with Forty (special effects)
- 2008 Mayerthorpe (special effects)
- 2008 Freezer Burn: The Invasion of Laxdale (special effects)
- 2007 Big City (special effects)
- 2007 Lost Holiday: The Jim & Suzanne Shemwell Story (special effects)
- 2007 Badland (special effects)
- 2007 Hush Little Baby (special effects)
- 2007 Scar (special effects)
- 2007 Decoys 2: Alien Seduction (special effects)
- 2006 Broken Trail (special effects)
- 2006 Android Apocalypse (special effects)
- 2006 Prairie Giant: The Tommy Douglas Story (special effects)
- 2005 Santa's Slay (special effects)
- 2005 Tideland (special effects)
- 2005 Fugitives Run (special effects)
- 2005 The Lazarus Child (special effects)
- 2004 Man in the Mirror: The Michael Jackson Story (special effects)
- 2004 Ginger Snaps Back: The Beginning (special effects)
- 2004 Family Sins (special effects)
- 2004 Try to Remember (special effects)
- 2004 It Must Be Love (special effects)
- 2004 Ginger Snaps 2: Unleashed (special effects)
- 2003 Picking Up & Dropping Off (special effects)
- 2003 Word of Honor (special effects)
- 2003 12 Mile Road (special effects)
- 2003 Shanghai Knights (special effects)
- 2002 Tornado Warning (special effects)
- 2002 K-19: The Widowmaker (special effects)
- 2002 Duct Tape Forever (special effects)
- 2001 Knockaround Guys (special effects)
- 2000 One Kill (special effects)
- 2000 Loser (special effects)
- 1999 Held Up (special effects)
- 1999 The Sheldon Kennedy Story (special effects)
- 1996 Portraits of a Killer (special effects)

=== Television ===
- 2016 Wynonna Earp (SyFy Channel, CHCH TV, SPACE) (practical special effects, prosthetics, creature effects)
- 2013 GM Goodwrench shoot, Joe Media (special effects)
- 2012 Better Way Alberta campaign, Jump Studios (special effects, props)
- 2008 The Englishman's Boy
- 2008 Work Safe Alberta - Bloody Lucky TV Commercials
- 2007-2016 Heartland
- 2007 Saving Grace – Pilot Episode
- 2007 Im Tal der wilden Rosen – Triumph der Liebe – Episode
- 2004 The Mountain
- 2003 Before We Ruled the Earth
- 1998 Big Bear

=== Performing Arts ===
- 2012 L'Effet de Serge (Theatre Junction)
- 2011 Kung Fu Panties (Ground Zero Theatre and Hit & Myth Productions)
- 2011 The Inventor (Calgary Opera)
- 2010 Don Giovanni (Calgary Opera)
- 2010 The Midnapore Cycle (St. Mary's University)
- 2009 Evil Dead: The Musical (Ground Zero Theatre and Hit & Myth Productions)
- 2009 The Lieutenant of Inishmore (Ground Zero Theatre and Hit & Myth Productions)
- 2008 Faust (Calgary Opera)
- 2008 Tosca (Calgary Opera)
- 2007 Frobisher (Calgary Opera)
- 2006 Cinderella (Calgary Opera)
- 2005-2010 A Christmas Carol (Theatre Calgary)
- 2005-2010 The Nutcracker (Alberta Ballet)

=== Live Events ===
- 2012 Calgary Stampede 2012 Parade Kick-Off (design and fabrication of "plunger" to start fireworks)
- 2012 Calgary Stampede Round-Up Centre events (pyrotechnics shows)
- 2011 Calgary Comic Expo (Pyro and fog effects for William Shatner's appearance, and for The Guild).
- 2011 Calgary Stampede's 2011 Grandstand Show props (oversized stylized heads and oversized horse heads, shields and swords).

=== Other ===
- 2017 Critical Mass Clorox Miniatures (fabrication)
- 2013 Alberta Ballet Balletlujah (fabrication)
- 2013 Joe Media GM Goodwrench commercials (special effects)
- 2013 Theatre Calgary (fabrication of rock chandelier)
- 2012-2013 MacLaren McCann (snow effects for Mark's Work Wearhouse print ad campaign)
- 2012 ATB Financial (fabrication of parade float)
- 2012 Tyrrell Museum of Palaeontology (design and fabrication of base for dolphin exhibit)
- 2012 Calgary Public Library (design and fabrication of parade float)
- 2012 Explosives Regulatory Division - Training, Edmonton Police Service
- 2011-2013 Air Canada Parade Float
- 2011-2013 Heritage Park Ghouls Night Out (special effects, fabrication)
- 2011 WAX Partnership 3D billboard/outdoor (design and fabrication of 3D figure and props)
- 2011 Venture Communications exhibit prop (design and fabrication of faux log for photo ops for Travel Alberta exhibit)
- 2010-2013 Camp Arcatheos (special effects, some props building)
- 2009-2011 Watermark Advertising (snow effects for Mark's Work Wearhouse print ad campaign)
