= Suneeva =

Film production company based in Toronto, Canada

Suneeva is a Canadian film production company located in Toronto, Ontario that produces TV commercials.

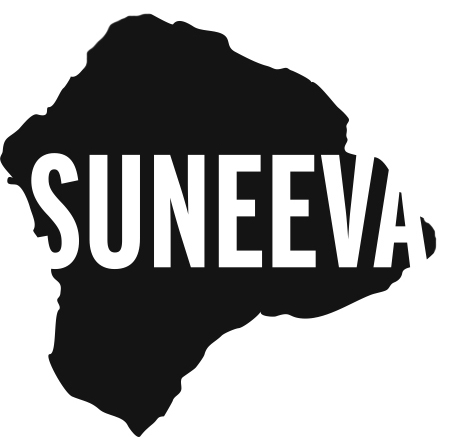
Suneeva's Logo

== The awards ==
Suneeva directors have won awards at: The ADCC's, The Bessies, AICP Awards, Clio Awards, Cannes Lions, London International Awards, Webbies, One Show and 2 consecutive best commercial director awards at the DGA Awards in 2009 and 2010.

== Associations ==
Suneeva is a member of the Association of Canadian Commercial Production (ACCP).

== Corporate design ==
Suneeva was recognized in the Taschen publication Brand Identity in 2009 for its corporate design.

== Directors ==
- Andre Betz
- Beatrice Pegard
- Carl Sundemo
- Charlie Mysak
- Elle Brooks-Tao
- Matt Dilmore
- GDF
- Alma Har'el
- Kim Jacobs
- Tom Kuntz
- Roman Laurent
- Shelley Lewis
- Mike Maguire
- Matt Ogens
- Mike Perry
- Martin Rodahl
- Tom Scharpling
- Thomas Schauer
- Matt Smukler
- James Stapelton
- Pam Thomas
- The Coles
- Tom Dream
- Thomas Schauer
- Victoria Granof
- Victor Boccard
