= Effective field goal percentage =

Statistic in basketball

In basketball, effective field goal percentage (abbreviated eFG%) is a statistic that adjusts field goal percentage to account for the fact that three-point field goals count for three points, while all other field goals only count for two points. Its goal is to show what field goal percentage a two-point shooter would have to shoot at to match the output of a player who also shoots three-pointers.

It is calculated by:

$eFG\% = \frac{FG + (0.5 * 3P)}{FGA}$

where:

- FG = field goals (both 2-point and 3-point) made
- 3P = 3-point field goals made
- FGA = field goal attempts

An alternate form of the formula is:

$eFG\% = \frac{2FG + (1.5 * 3FG)}{FGA}$

where:

- 2FG = 2-point field goals made
- 3FG = 3-point field goals made
- FGA = field goal attempts

A common criticism of this formula is that shooters with very high percentage success rates, which favor 3 point shots, would arrive at an eFG% above 100%.

It can also be calculated by:

$eFG\% = \frac{\frac{PPG - FT}{2}}{FGA}$

where:

- PPG = points per game
- FT = free throws made
- FGA = field goal attempts

The advantage of this second formula is that it highlights the aforementioned logic behind the statistic, where it is pretended that a player only shot two-point shots (hence the division of non-free-throw points by 2).

== Leaders ==
In the National Basketball Association (NBA), the statistic is available for seasons since the 1946–47 season. The highest career effective field goal percentage is .6736, by DeAndre Jordan. The highest effective field goal percentage for one season is .7419, by Mitchell Robinson which he achieved during the 2019–20 season. Wilt Chamberlain has led the league in effective field goal percentage a record nine times. Shaquille O'Neal led the league six times. DeAndre Jordan led the league five times. Artis Gilmore and Rudy Gobert each led the league four times. Neil Johnston led the league three times. Charles Barkley, Brent Barry, Johnny Green, Alex Groza, Cedric Maxwell, Ken Sears and Buck Williams each lead the league two times. Wilt Chamberlain, and DeAndre Jordan each hold the record for consecutive seasons leading the league in effective field goal percentage (5x). Other players to lead the league in field goal percentage include Artis Gilmore (4x), Rudy Gobert (3x), Charles Barkley, Neil Johnston, Johnny Green, Alex Groza, Cedric Maxwell, Ken Sears and Buck Williams each did it (2x).

=== Year-by-year ===
| ^ | Denotes player who is still active in the NBA |
| * | Inducted into the Naismith Memorial Basketball Hall of Fame |

| Season | Player | Position | Effective field goal percentage | Team |
|---|---|---|---|---|
| 1946–47 | Bob Feerick | Forward / guard | .4009 | Washington Capitols |
| 1947–48 | Buddy Jeannette* | Guard | .3488 | Baltimore Bullets |
| 1948–49 | Arnie Risen* | Center | .4228 | Rochester Royals |
| 1949–50 | Alex Groza | Center | .4780 | Indianapolis Olympians |
| 1950–51 | Alex Groza (2) | Center | .4704 | Indianapolis Olympians |
| 1951–52 | Paul Arizin* | Small forward | .4485 | Philadelphia Warriors |
| 1952–53 | Neil Johnston* | Center | .4524 | Philadelphia Warriors |
| 1953–54 | Ed Macauley* | Center / power forward | .4863 | Boston Celtics |
| 1954–55 | Larry Foust | Power forward / center | .4865 | Fort Wayne Pistons |
| 1955–56 | Neil Johnston* (2) | Center | .4570 | Philadelphia Warriors |
| 1956–57 | Neil Johnston* (3) | Center | .4471 | Philadelphia Warriors |
| 1957–58 | Jack Twyman* | Small forward | .4523 | Cincinnati Royals |
| 1958–59 | Ken Sears | Power forward / small forward | .4900 | New York Knicks |
| 1959–60 | Ken Sears (2) | Power forward / small forward | .4774 | New York Knicks |
| 1960–61 | Wilt Chamberlain* | Center | .5092 | Philadelphia Warriors |
| 1961–62 | Walt Bellamy* | Center | .5189 | Chicago Packers |
| 1962–63 | Wilt Chamberlain* (2) | Center | .5282 | San Francisco Warriors |
| 1963–64 | Jerry Lucas* | Power forward | .5266 | Cincinnati Royals |
| 1964–65 | Wilt Chamberlain* (3) | Center | .5103 | San Francisco Warriors; Philadelphia 76ers |
| 1965–66 | Wilt Chamberlain* (4) | Center | .5397 | Philadelphia 76ers |
| 1966–67 | Wilt Chamberlain* (5) | Center | .6826 | Philadelphia 76ers |
| 1967–68 | Wilt Chamberlain* (6) | Center | .5948 | Philadelphia 76ers |
| 1968–69 | Wilt Chamberlain* (7) | Center | .5833 | Los Angeles Lakers |
| 1969–70 | Johnny Green | Power forward | .5593 | Cincinnati Royals |
| 1970–71 | Johnny Green (2) | Power forward | .5871 | Cincinnati Royals |
| 1971–72 | Wilt Chamberlain* (8) | Center | .6492 | Los Angeles Lakers |
| 1972–73 | Wilt Chamberlain* (9) | Center | .7270 | Los Angeles Lakers |
| 1973–74 | Bob McAdoo* | Center | .5471 | Buffalo Braves |
| 1974–75 | Don Nelson | Small forward | .5389 | Boston Celtics |
| 1975–76 | Wes Unseld* | Center | .5608 | Washington Bullets |
| 1976–77 | Kareem Abdul-Jabbar* | Center | .5793 | Los Angeles Lakers |
| 1977–78 | Bobby Jones* | Power forward | .5782 | Denver Nuggets |
| 1978–79 | Cedric Maxwell | Small forward | .5842 | Boston Celtics |
| 1979–80 | Cedric Maxwell (2) | Small forward | .6093 | Boston Celtics |
| 1980–81 | Artis Gilmore* | Center | .6703 | Chicago Bulls |
| 1981–82 | Artis Gilmore* (2) | Center | .6529 | Chicago Bulls |
| 1982–83 | Artis Gilmore* (3) | Center | .6261 | San Antonio Spurs |
| 1983–84 | Artis Gilmore* (4) | Center | .6313 | San Antonio Spurs |
| 1984–85 | James Donaldson | Center | .6370 | Los Angeles Clippers |
| 1985–86 | Steve Johnson | Power forward / center | .6318 | San Antonio Spurs |
| 1986–87 | Charles Barkley* | Power forward / small forward | .6057 | Philadelphia 76ers |
| 1987–88 | Charles Barkley* (2) | Power forward / small forward | .6040 | Philadelphia 76ers |
| 1988–89 | Dennis Rodman* | Power forward / small forward | .6008 | Detroit Pistons |
| 1989–90 | Mark West | Center | .6245 | Phoenix Suns |
| 1990–91 | Buck Williams | Power forward | .6017 | Portland Trail Blazers |
| 1991–92 | Buck Williams (2) | Power forward | .6039 | Portland Trail Blazers |
| 1992–93 | Kenny Smith | Point guard | .5847 | Houston Rockets |
| 1993–94 | Shaquille O'Neal* | Center | .5990 | Orlando Magic |
| 1994–95 | Chris Gatling | Power forward / center | .6328 | Golden State Warriors |
| 1995–96 | John Stockton* | Point guard | .5960 | Utah Jazz |
| 1996–97 | Chris Mullin* | Small forward / shooting guard | .6054 | Golden State Warriors |
| 1997–98 | Dale Ellis | Small forward / shooting guard | .5879 | Seattle SuperSonics |
| 1998–99 | Shaquille O'Neal* (2) | Center | .5763 | Los Angeles Lakers |
| 1999–2000 | Brent Barry | shooting guard | .5785 | Seattle SuperSonics |
| 2000–01 | Shaquille O'Neal* (3) | Center | .5717 | Los Angeles Lakers |
| 2001–02 | Brent Barry (2) | shooting guard | .6114 | Seattle SuperSonics |
| 2002–03 | Eddy Curry | Center | .5846 | Chicago Bulls |
| 2003–04 | Shaquille O'Neal* (4) | Center | .5844 | Los Angeles Lakers |
| 2004–05 | Damon Jones | Point guard / shooting guard | .6109 | Miami Heat |
| 2005–06 | Shaquille O'Neal* (5) | Center | .6000 | Miami Heat |
| 2006–07 | Steve Nash* | Point guard | .6128 | Phoenix Suns |
| 2007–08 | Andris Biedriņš | Center | .6261 | Golden State Warriors |
| 2008–09 | Shaquille O'Neal* (6) | Center | .6088 | Phoenix Suns |
| 2009–10 | Dwight Howard* | Center | .6115 | Orlando Magic |
| 2010–11 | Nenê | Center / power forward | .6154 | Denver Nuggets |
| 2011–12 | Tyson Chandler | Center | .6789 | New York Knicks |
| 2012–13 | DeAndre Jordan^ | Center | .6434 | Los Angeles Clippers |
| 2013–14 | DeAndre Jordan^ (2) | Center | .6757 | Los Angeles Clippers |
| 2014–15 | DeAndre Jordan^ (3) | Center | .7107 | Los Angeles Clippers |
| 2015–16 | DeAndre Jordan^ (4) | Center | .7028 | Los Angeles Clippers |
| 2016–17 | DeAndre Jordan^ (5) | Center | .7140 | Los Angeles Clippers |
| 2017–18 | Clint Capela^ | Center | .6524 | Houston Rockets |
| 2018–19 | Rudy Gobert^ | Center | .6685 | Utah Jazz |
| 2019–20 | Mitchell Robinson^ | Center | .7419 | New York Knicks |
| 2020–21 | Rudy Gobert^ (2) | Center | .6753 | Utah Jazz |
| 2021–22 | Rudy Gobert^ (3) | Center | .7126 | Utah Jazz |
| 2022–23 | Nic Claxton^ | Center | .7053 | Brooklyn Nets |
| 2023–24 | Daniel Gafford^ | Center | .7250 | Washington Wizards; Dallas Mavericks |
| 2024–25 | Jarrett Allen^ | Center | .7063 | Cleveland Cavaliers |
| 2025–26 | Rudy Gobert^ (4) | Center | .6823 | Minnesota Timberwolves |

== Multiple-time leaders ==
| Rank | Player | Team | Times leader | Years |
|---|---|---|---|---|
| 1 | Wilt Chamberlain | Philadelphia Warriors/San Francisco Warriors (3) / Philadelphia 76ers (3) / Los Angeles Lakers (3) | 9 | 1961, 1963, 1965, 1966, 1967, 1968, 1969, 1972, 1973 |
| 2 | Shaquille O'Neal | Orlando Magic (1) / Los Angeles Lakers (3) / Miami Heat (1) / Phoenix Suns (1) | 6 | 1993–94, 1998–99, 2000–01, 2003–04, 2005–06, 2008–09 |
| 3 | DeAndre Jordan | Los Angeles Clippers | 5 | 2013, 2014, 2015, 2016, 2017 |
| 4 | Artis Gilmore | Chicago Bulls (2) / San Antonio Spurs (2) | 4 | 1981, 1982, 1983, 1984 |
| 4 | Rudy Gobert | Utah Jazz (3) / Minnesota Timberwolves (1) | 4 | 2019, 2020, 2021, 2026 |
| 6 | Neil Johnston | Philadelphia Warriors | 3 | 1953, 1956, 1957 |
| 7 | Charles Barkley | Philadelphia 76ers | 2 | 1986–87, 1987–88 |
| 7 | Brent Barry | Seattle SuperSonics | 2 | 1999–2000, 2001–02 |
| 7 | Johnny Green | Cincinnati Royals | 2 | 1970, 1971 |
| 7 | Alex Groza | Indianapolis Olympians | 2 | 1950, 1951 |
| 7 | Cedric Maxwell | Boston Celtics | 2 | 1979, 1980 |
| 7 | Ken Sears | New York Knicks | 2 | 1959, 1960 |
| 7 | Buck Williams | Portland Trail Blazers | 2 | 1991, 1992 |

== See also ==
- NBA records
- Basketball statistics
- Advanced statistics in basketball
