= Appetite Production =

Polish film production company

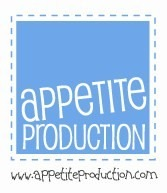
Appetite Production logo

Appetite Production is a Polish film production company based in Kraków, Poland. The company was founded in 2008 by Joanna Szymanska and Aleksandra Swierk both of which had previous experience in film production, working as production managers for multiple shorts produced by University of Silesia Film and Television Department.

Appetite’s first production was an independent live action short comedy Merry Christmas with Jason Nwoga and directed by Tomasz Jurkiewicz. Film, released in April 2009, received positive reviews and won several awards on Polish independent film festivals, including Special Audience Award at 10th Era New Horizons Film Festival.

The company acts not only as an independent producer and co-producer for international projects but also provides film production services for domestic and foreign companies. Latest result of such involvement is an apocalyptic feature directed by acknowledged Polish painter Wilhelm Sasnal – The Fallout – produced in cooperation with Sadie Coles HQ art gallery.

== Filmography ==
- 2010 – The Fallout (PL Opad, feature; dir. Wilhelm Sasnal, Anka Sasnal) – Executive Producer
- 2010 – World according to Hania and Stas (PL: Swiat wedlug Hani i Stasia, documentary; dir. Tomasz Jurkiewicz) - Producer
- 2009 – Merry Christmas (PL: Wesolych Swiat, short live action; dir. Tomasz Jurkiewicz) – Producer
- 2008 – Fuse TV Excellent Adventure Castle Party Bolkow – Polish Unit Production Management
