= Charles Shackleford =

American basketball player (1966–2017)

Personal information
- Born: April 22, 1966 Kinston, North Carolina, U.S.
- Died: January 27, 2017 (aged 50) Kinston, North Carolina, U.S.
- Listed height: 6 ft 11 in (2.11 m)
- Listed weight: 245 lb (111 kg)

Career information
- High school: Kinston (Kinston, North Carolina)
- College: NC State (1985–1988)
- NBA draft: 1988: 2nd round, 32nd overall pick
- Drafted by: New Jersey Nets
- Playing career: 1988–1999
- Position: Center / power forward
- Number: 33, 14, 17

Career history
- 1988–1990: New Jersey Nets
- 1990–1991: Phonola Caserta
- 1991–1993: Philadelphia 76ers
- 1993–1994: Onyx Caserta
- 1994: Minnesota Timberwolves
- 1995–1996: Ülkerspor
- 1996–1997: Aris
- 1997–1998: P.A.O.K.
- 1998–1999: Idaho Stampede
- 1999: Charlotte Hornets

Career highlights
- First-team All-ACC (1988); Fourth-team Parade All-American (1985)

Career NBA statistics
- Points: 1,625 (5.4 ppg)
- Rebounds: 1,448 (4.8 rpg)
- Stats at NBA.com
- Stats at Basketball Reference

Charles Edward Shackleford (April 22, 1966 – January 27, 2017) was an American professional basketball player who played several seasons in the National Basketball Association (NBA).

He played center and power forward, he was renowned for his rebounding – regularly leading leagues in Europe. He played six seasons in the NBA, mostly as a bench player, intersected by seasons in Europe where he had more success.

Off the court, he was involved in a number of controversies and legal issues. Shackleford is sometimes remembered for telling a reporter after a NC State basketball game that "I can shoot with my left hand, I can shoot with my right hand, I'm amphibious."

== College career ==
Shackleford played College basketball for North Carolina State in the Atlantic Coast Conference (ACC) of the NCAA Division I from 1985 to 1988.

He was suspended in the fall of 1986 because of poor grades, being reinstated for the spring semester after an appeal and a contractual agreement to attend all classes, with the unusual involvement of chancellor Bruce Poulton. Former head of the NC physical education department, Richard Lauffer, described him as a poor student, without "any interest in trying to get an education" and who "should never have been in school."

On the court, Shackleford, nicknamed Shack by fans, was described as the Wolfpack's "indispensable man" and an imposing physical presence. He was an All-ACC selection in 1988 as he led the conference in rebounding.

He declared early for the NBA draft as a junior in May 1988, invoking hardship.

=== North Carolina State scandal ===
It was implied in 1989, first through a book, Personal Fouls by Peter Golenbock, that North Carolina State was home to a number of mispractices, with NBC naming Shackleford as suspected "of deliberately losing an NCAA Tournament game to avoid NCAA drug testing."

Even more serious were allegations by ABC that Shackleford and three of his teammates took part in point-shaving during the 1987–88 season, with New Jersey businessman Robert Kramer said to have given $20,000 to Shackleford, who then distributed the cash. While Shackleford admitted to receiving the sum from Kramer and $45,000 from agent Larry Gillman, in violation of NCAA rules, he denied shaving points, with the loan from Kramer supposedly made to pay off Gillman, he declared repaying both loans by 1990.

An investigation into the point shaving allegations ended in 1993, without charges being filed, when a New Jersey grand jury found insufficient evidence to support criminal charges.

== Professional career ==
Shackleford was selected by the New Jersey Nets in the 2nd round (32nd overall pick) of the 1988 NBA draft. He played 130 games for the Nets in two seasons, starting 37. The 1989–90 NBA season was his statistical best in the NBA, with personal highs in minutes (22.2), points (8.2) and rebounds (6.8) per game. He had a career high of 23 points and 26 rebounds in a 20 February 1990 game against the Milwaukee Bucks, his rebound tally tied second-most for the Nets in a single game until at least 2005.

He then moved to Italy, to play for Phonola Caserta in the Serie A. He contributed 19.7 points and 15.8 rebounds (a league best) as the team won the 1990–91 title, the first in their history.

Shackleford returned to the United States to play in the NBA for the Philadelphia 76ers in 1991, signing a three-year contract – with two years guaranteed – at a reported annual salary of $1.3 million. He stayed two seasons, the first as a starter (62 games out of 72) with 6.6 points and 5.8 rebounds on average during 1991–92.

He rejoined Caserta in Italy for 1993–94, signing a reported $1 million contract, and again led the league in rebounds.

A return to the U.S. to play for the Minnesota Timberwolves followed in September 1994, but he was waived in February 1995 after 21 games.

Joining Turkish Basketball League side Ülkerspor next, he led the European first tier EuroLeague in rebounding during 1995–96 with 12.4 rebounds. Despite this, Shackleford – at the time the most expensive import in Turkish basketball history – was released due to an injury, a cited lack of motivation and unwillingness to work.

Moving to Aris Thessaloniki of the Greek Basket League the next season, he helped the team win the European third tier 1997 Korać Cup, with his defensive effort in the second leg of the final described as determinant. He also led the league in rebounding despite suffering from arthritis.

He joined the Washington Wizards after having knee surgery, though he was released in less than a week in October 1997.

Shackleford then returned to Greece, signing with P.A.O.K. for the season.

After a brief stint in the Continental Basketball Association with the Idaho Stampede, Shackleford joined the Charlotte Hornets in January 1999. He played in 32 games for the Hornets in the 1998–99 NBA season, the last games he would play in his professional career.

When his contract expired in July of that year, he tried out unsuccessfully for a number of NBA teams, and retired in 2000.

== Legal issues ==
Shackleford was arrested in March 1990 in Orange, New Jersey with several grams of marijuana in his possession, an offense but not a criminal count. This offense did not fall under the NBA's anti-drug program, but Shackleford was sentenced to probation.

Shackleford was arrested in Johnston County, North Carolina in January 2006 during a routine traffic stop, and was charged with carrying a concealed weapon, and misdemeanor possession of marijuana and cocaine. He posted an $11,000 bond.

In January 2010, a car belonging to Jayson Williams rearended another car in Myrtle Beach, South Carolina. Williams identified himself to police as the driver, but Shackleford later admitted he had been behind the wheel. He was charged with driving with a suspended license and hindering/resisting arrest by providing false information. Shackleford was also arrested in Kinston, North Carolina in July of that year, after he sold prescription drugs to an undercover deputy during a sting operation. Since he reportedly had no assets left from his time playing in the NBA, a court-appointed attorney was assigned to him.

== Death ==
Shackleford died in his Kinston, North Carolina home on the morning of January 27, 2017 at the age of 50 after suffering from a heart attack.

== Career statistics ==
Legend
| GP | Games played | GS | Games started | MPG | Minutes per game |
| FG% | Field goal percentage | 3P% | 3-point field goal percentage | FT% | Free throw percentage |
| RPG | Rebounds per game | APG | Assists per game | SPG | Steals per game |
| BPG | Blocks per game | PPG | Points per game | **Bold** | Career high |

=== NBA ===
==== Regular season ====
| Year | Team | GP | GS | MPG | FG% | 3P% | FT% | RPG | APG | SPG | BPG | PPG |
|---|---|---|---|---|---|---|---|---|---|---|---|---|
| 1988–89 | New Jersey | 60 | 0 | 8.1 | .494 | .000 | .500 | 2.6 | .4 | .3 | .3 | 3.1 |
| 1989–90 | New Jersey | 70 | 37 | **22.2** | .462 | .000 | .687 | **6.8** | **.8** | **.6** | .5 | **8.2** |
| 1991–92 | Philadelphia | **72** | **62** | 19.4 | .486 | .000 | .663 | 5.8 | .6 | .5 | **.7** | 6.6 |
| 1992–93 | Philadelphia | 48 | 0 | 11.8 | .488 | .000 | .633 | 4.3 | .5 | .3 | .5 | 4.0 |
| 1994–95 | Minnesota | 21 | 2 | 11.4 | **.600** | – | .800 | 3.2 | .4 | .4 | .3 | 4.5 |
| 1998–99 | Charlotte | 32 | 4 | 11.5 | .489 | – | .655 | 4.0 | .4 | .2 | .4 | 3.3 |
| Career | | 303 | 105 | 15.2 | .483 | .000 | .654 | 4.8 | .6 | .4 | .5 | 5.4 |
