= 2014–15 Michigan Wolverines men's basketball team =

American college basketball season

2014–15 Michigan Wolverines men's basketball

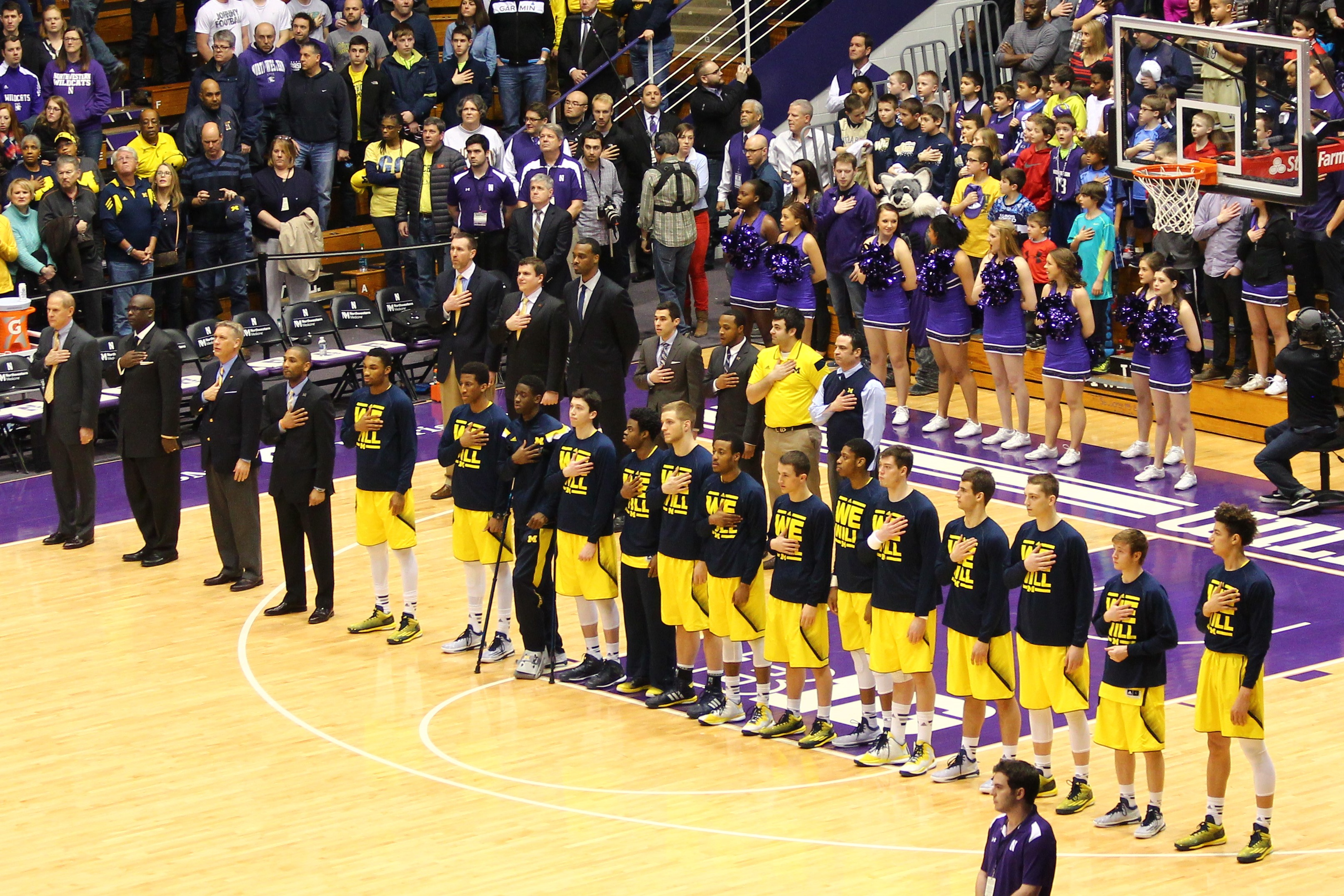
- Conference: Big Ten Conference
- Record: 16–16 (8–10, 9th Big Ten)
- Head coach: John Beilein (8th season)
- Assistant coaches: Jeff Meyer; LaVall Jordan; Bacari Alexander
- MVPs: Spike Albrecht; Zak Irvin
- Captains: Caris LeVert; Spike Albrecht
- Home arena: Crisler Center

2014–15 Big Ten Conference men's basketball standings
	Conf.				Overall
Team	W		L	PCT	W		L	PCT
No. 3 Wisconsin †	16	–	2	.889	36	–	4	.900
No. 12 Maryland	14	–	4	.778	28	–	7	.800
No. 23 Michigan State	12	–	6	.667	27	–	12	.692
Iowa	12	–	6	.667	22	–	12	.647
Purdue	12	–	6	.667	21	–	13	.618
Ohio State	11	–	7	.611	24	–	11	.686
Indiana	9	–	9	.500	20	–	14	.588
Illinois	9	–	9	.500	19	–	14	.576
Michigan	8	–	10	.444	16	–	16	.500
Minnesota	6	–	12	.333	18	–	15	.545
Northwestern	6	–	12	.333	15	–	17	.469
Nebraska	5	–	13	.278	13	–	18	.419
Penn State	4	–	14	.222	18	–	16	.529
Rutgers	2	–	16	.111	10	–	22	.313
† 2015 Big Ten tournament winner Rankings from AP poll

The 2014–15 Michigan Wolverines men's basketball team represented the University of Michigan during the 2014–15 NCAA Division I men's basketball season. The team played its home games in Ann Arbor, Michigan for the 48th consecutive year at the Crisler Center, which has a capacity of 12,707. This season marked the program's 99th season and its 98th consecutive year as a member of the Big Ten Conference. The team was led by 8th year head coach John Beilein, who was voted as 2014 Big Ten Coach of the Year by the Big Ten media. The 2013–14 team was Big Ten champion, earning the school's first outright title since 1986. The program entered the season coming off its winningest two-year stretch, having won 59 games in the two previous seasons. The team was also coming off four consecutive NCAA Division I men's basketball tournament appearances.

The 2014–15 team needed to replace the losses of Nik Stauskas, Mitch McGary and Glenn Robinson III to the 2014 NBA draft and Jon Horford and Jordan Morgan to graduation. It began the season ranked in both the AP Poll (#24) and Coaches' Poll (#23). Guard Caris LeVert was named a preseason All-American according to numerous media outlets and preseason All-Big Ten according to the Big Ten media. LeVert, however, suffered a season-ending foot injury in January. At the end of that month, Derrick Walton was sidelined for the season. The team struggled without two of its leaders as it went from a 6–3 win–loss record in conference to finish 8–10. After falling in the quarterfinals of the 2015 Big Ten Conference men's basketball tournament the team's season ended with a 16–16 record.

== Roster changes ==
=== Departures ===
Jordan Morgan graduated after using all of his eligibility. Horford announced on April 10 that he would use his 5th year of redshirt eligibility by transferring to a graduate program at another school for the 2014–15 NCAA Division I men's basketball season. On April 26, Horford announced he was transferring to play for the Florida Gators men's basketball team.

On April 15, in a joint press conference on the Big Ten Network, Glenn Robinson III and Nik Stauskas announced that they were declaring themselves eligible for the 2014 NBA draft. On April 25, Mitch McGary declared for the draft. He was facing a season-long NCAA suspension after testing positive for marijuana after the Wolverines' NCAA tournament win over Tennessee, a game for which he dressed but was not able to play. When all three players were drafted, it marked the first time Michigan had at least three draft picks since the 1990 NBA draft.

Name	Number	Pos.	Height	Weight	Year	Hometown	Notes
Nik Stauskas	11	SG	6'6"	205	Sophomore	Mississauga, Ontario	2014 NBA draft
Glenn Robinson III	1	SF	6'6"	220	Sophomore	Gary, Indiana	2014 NBA draft
Mitch McGary	4	PF	6'10"	250	Sophomore	Chesterton, Indiana	2014 NBA draft
Jon Horford	15	PF	6'10"	250	Junior (redshirt)	Lansing, Michigan	Graduated (transferred to Florida)
Jordan Morgan	52	C	6'8"	250	Senior (redshirt)	Detroit, Michigan	Graduated

=== 2014–15 team recruits ===
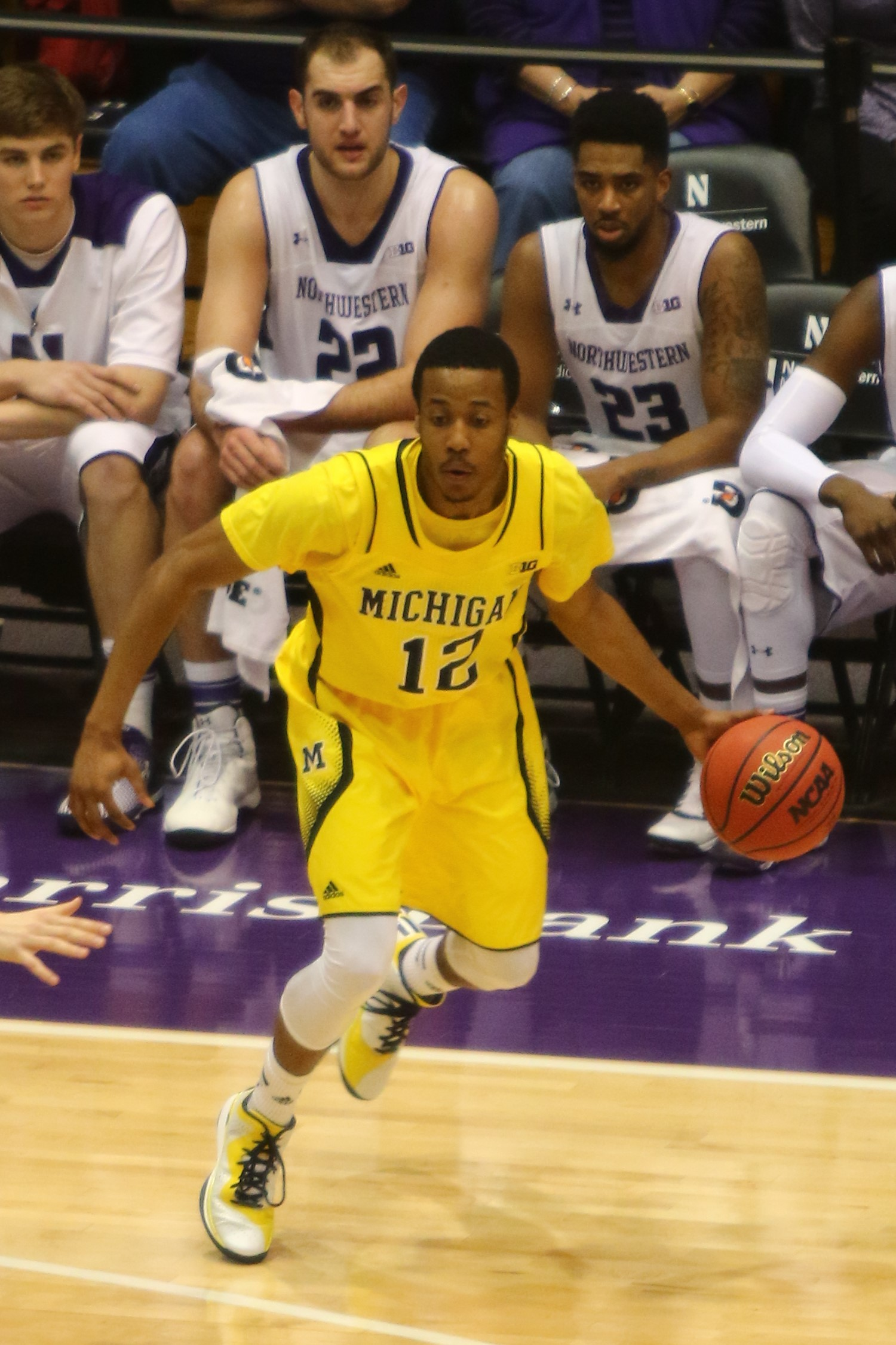
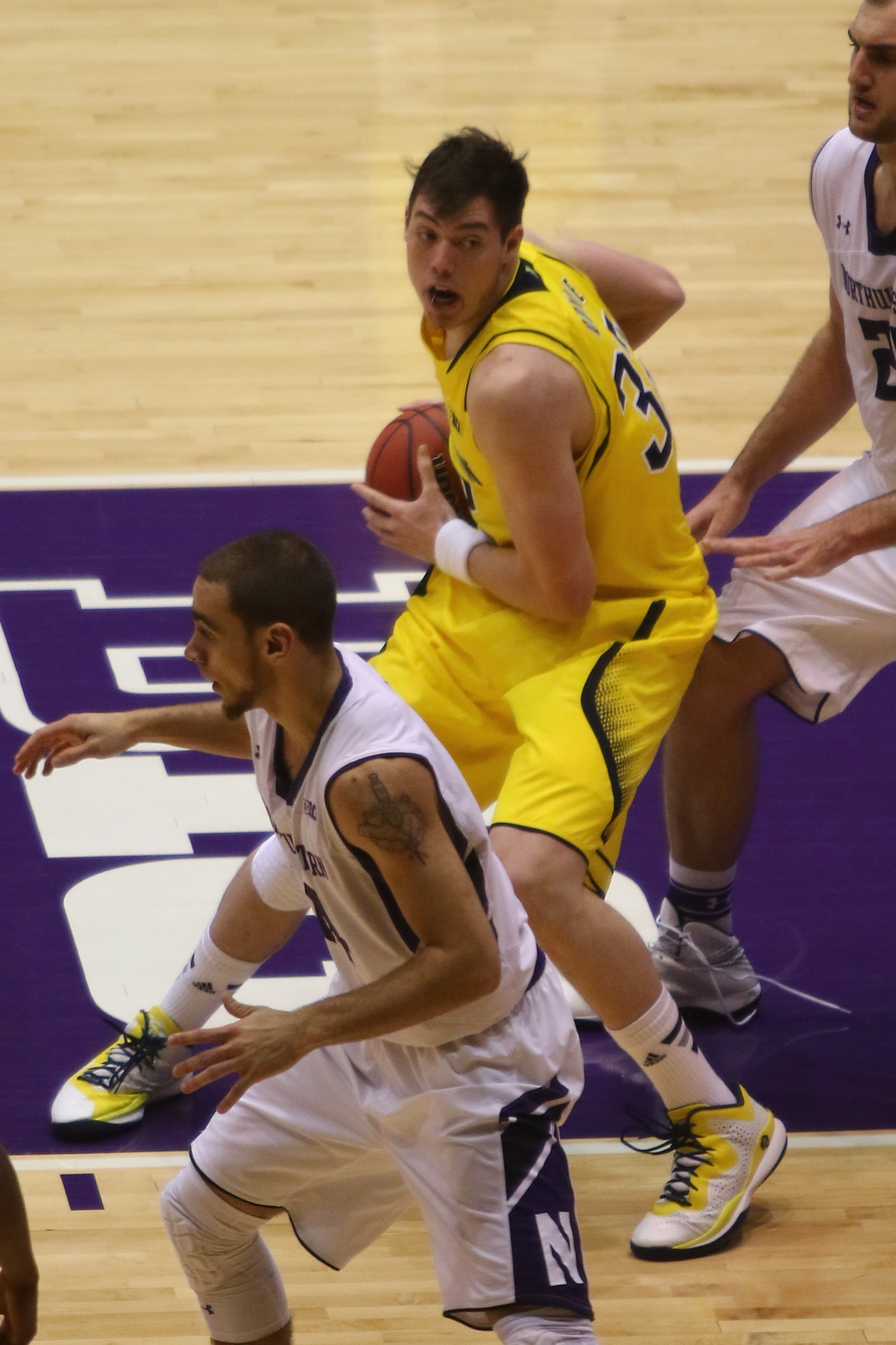
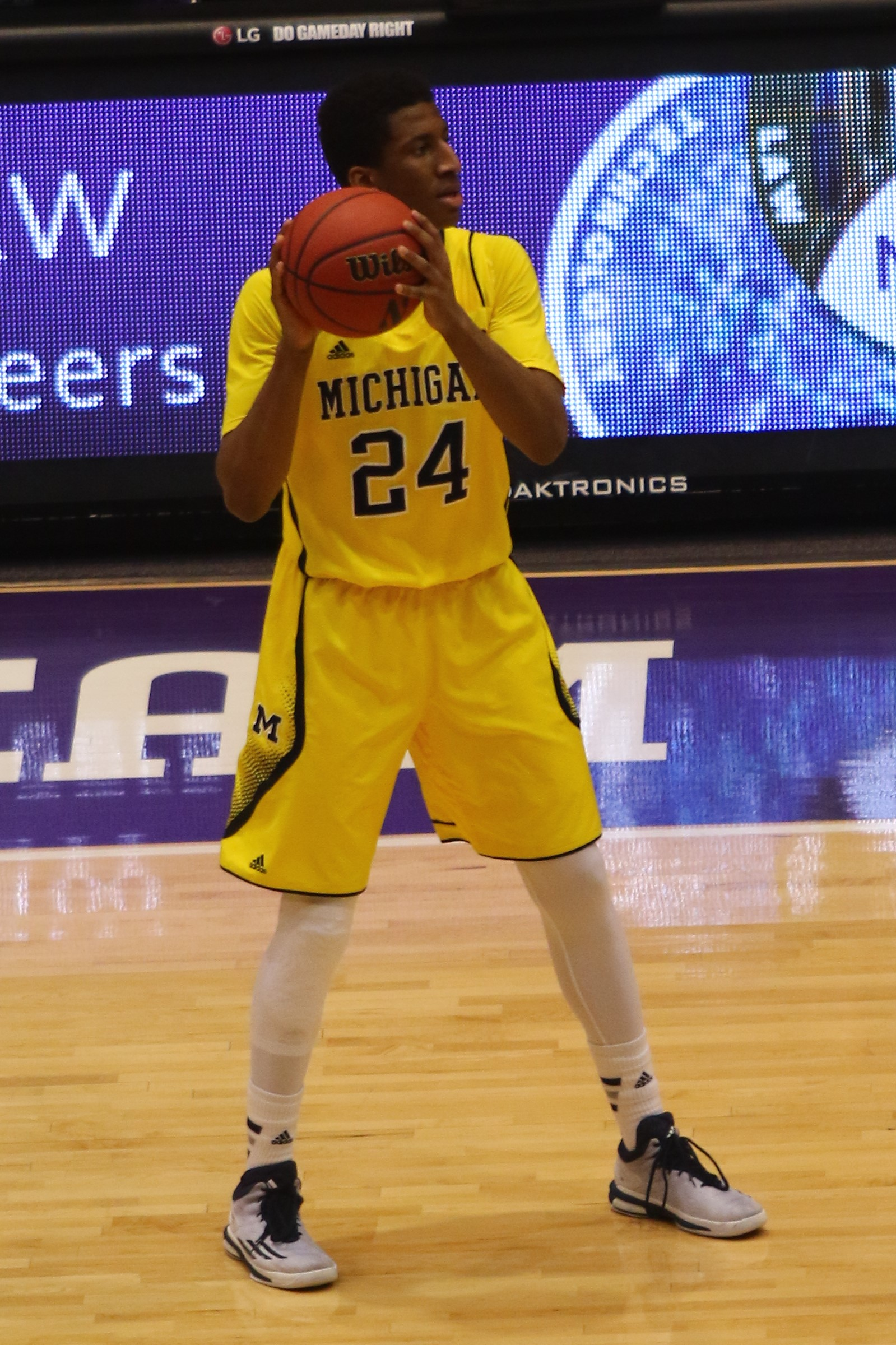
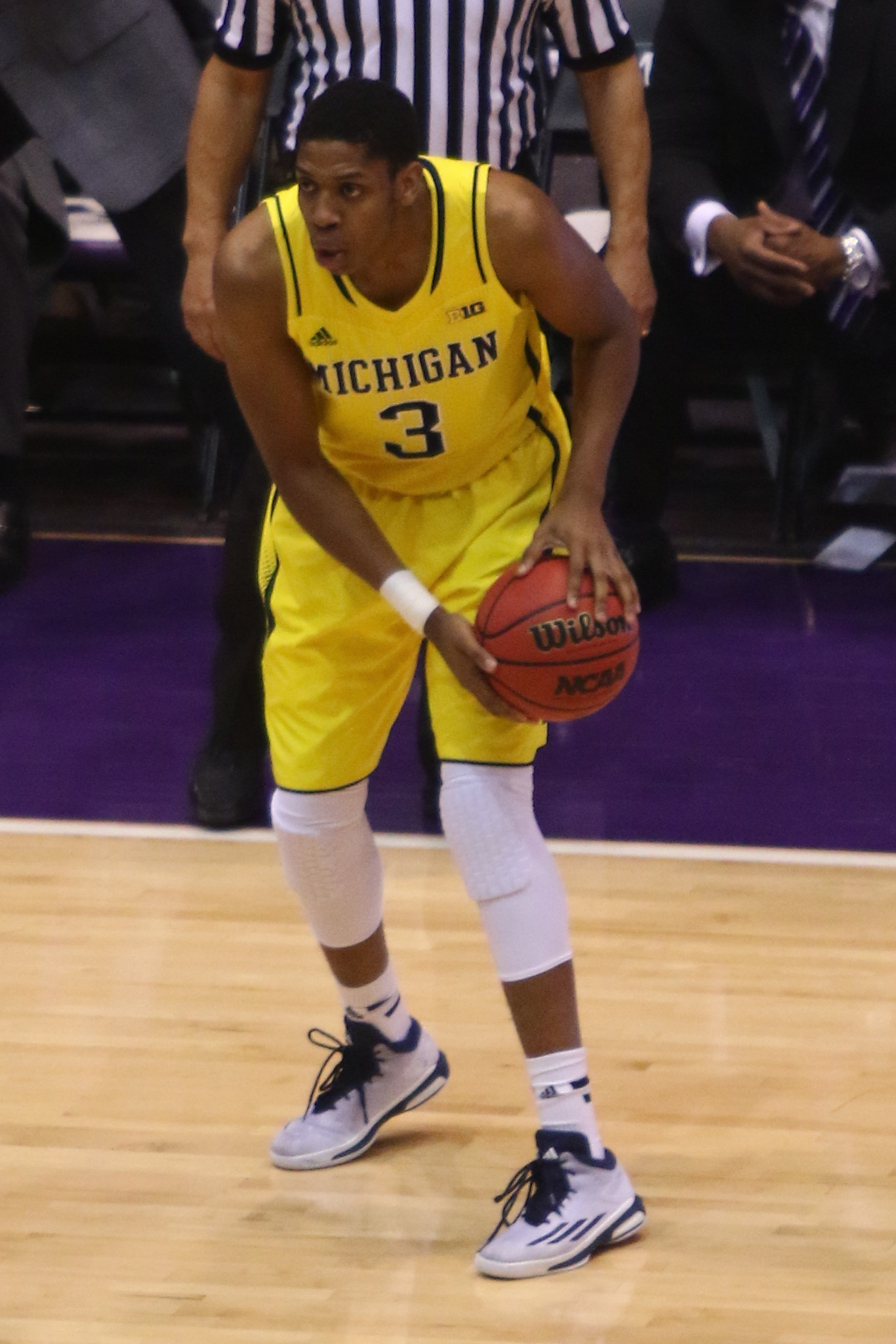
Clockwise from top left Muhammad Ali Abdur-Rahkman, Ricky Doyle, Kameron Chatman and Aubrey Dawkins all started more than 10 games for the 2014–15 Michigan Wolverines as true freshmen.

After Stauskas and Robinson declared for the NBA, Michigan signed Muhammad Ali Abdur-Rahkman on April 19. On April 28, Michigan signed Aubrey Dawkins, son of former Duke Naismith College Player of the Year, National Basketball Association point guard and Stanford head coach Johnny Dawkins.

College recruiting
Name	Hometown	School	Height	Weight	Commit date
Austin Hatch; SG	Fort Wayne, IN	Canterbury School (IN)	6 ft 6 in (1.98 m)	214 lb (97 kg)	Jun 23, 2011
Austin Hatch; SG	Recruit ratings: Rivals: ESPN:				
Ricky Doyle; PF	Fort Myers, FL	Bishop Verot (FL)	6 ft 8 in (2.03 m)	231 lb (105 kg)	Mar 11, 2013
Ricky Doyle; PF	Recruit ratings: Scout: Rivals: 247Sports: ESPN:				
D. J. Wilson; SF/PF	Sacramento, CA	Capital Christian (CA)	6 ft 8 in (2.03 m)	210 lb (95 kg)	Oct 6, 2013
D. J. Wilson; SF/PF	Recruit ratings: Scout: Rivals: 247Sports: ESPN:				
Kameron Chatman; SF	Portland, OR	Columbia Christian (OR)	6 ft 7 in (2.01 m)	196 lb (89 kg)	Oct 2, 2013
Kameron Chatman; SF	Recruit ratings: Scout: Rivals: 247Sports: ESPN:				
Aubrey Dawkins; SG/SF	Palo Alto, CA	New Hampton School (NH)	6 ft 4 in (1.93 m)	180 lb (82 kg)	Apr 28, 2014
Aubrey Dawkins; SG/SF	Recruit ratings: Scout: Rivals: 247Sports: ESPN:				
Muhammad Ali Abdur Rahkman; SG	Allentown, PA	Central Catholic (PA)	6 ft 4 in (1.93 m)	180 lb (82 kg)	Apr 19, 2014
Muhammad Ali Abdur Rahkman; SG	Recruit ratings: Scout: Rivals: 247Sports: ESPN:				
Overall recruit ranking: Scout: 17 Rivals: 25 ESPN: 29
Note: In many cases, Scout, Rivals, 247Sports, On3, and ESPN may conflict in their listings of height and weight.; In these cases, the average was taken. ESPN grades are on a 100-point scale.; Sources: "Michigan 2014 Basketball Commitments". Rivals.; "2014 Michigan Basketball Commits". Scout.; "ESPN Recruiting Nation Basketball". ESPN.; "Scout.com Team Recruiting Rankings". Scout.; "2014 Team Ranking". Rivals.

=== Future recruits ===
On August 6, Duncan Robinson announced that he would transfer to Michigan with three years of eligibility remaining and sit out the 2014–15 season after Division III Williams College head coach Mike Maker announced his departure to coach at Marist. On August 8, 2014, 6-foot-11-inch (2.11 m) Jon Teske became Michigan basketball's first class of 2016 commit.

== Post-tournament predictions ==
Immediately following the 2014 NCAA tournament, the earliest predictions started being made by the media despite draft status uncertainty. While uncertainty about Stauskas', Robinson's and McGary's returns remained speculation, projections abounded: 9 by Yahoo! Sports, 14 by Bleacher Report, 17 by ESPN, 18 by USA Today, 20 by NBC Sports and CBS Sports. Following the April 27 NBA draft entry deadline, revised predictions had Michigan a little lower: 19 by Bleacher Report, 24 by ESPN and NBC Sports, unranked by CBS Sports and USA Today. Despite the projected rankings the Las Vegas 2015 NCAA Division I men's basketball tournament betting lines showed only 11 schools with shorter odds than Michigan who was in a 6-way tie for 12th place at 33:1 on April 29.

== Offseason ==
On May 12, LeVert underwent surgery to repair a stress fracture in his foot. He was expected to be sidelined for 8–10 weeks, but be available for the team's August trip to play in Europe. Beilein announced on June 3 that Max Bielfeldt had undergone hip surgery and was expected to miss most of the summer. On August 6, D. J. Wilson was sidelined for 4–6 weeks following surgery on his pinky finger. This announcement came prior to the team's August 15 departure for its summer trip to Italy.

The team participated in a four-game exhibition tour of Italy that included stops in Rome, Verona, Vicenza, Venice and Lake Como from August 15–24. On August 28, Beilein became the 2013–14 recipient of the NCAA's Bob Frederick Sportsmanship Award, which honors "an NCAA member institution coach or administrator who exhibits a lifelong commitment to sportsmanship and ethical conduct, leading by example and promoting positive fan involvement in and out of competition."

== Preseason ==
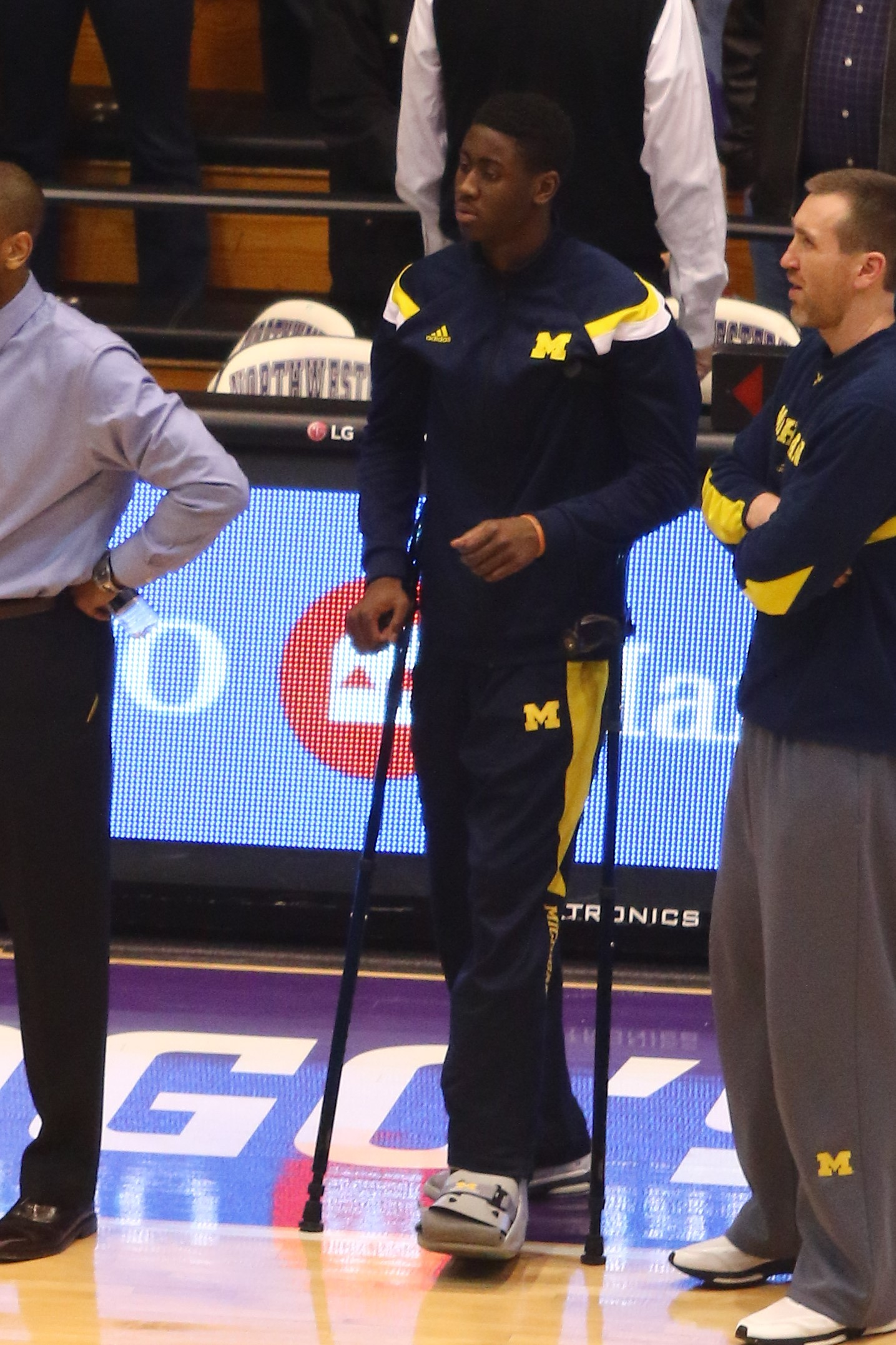
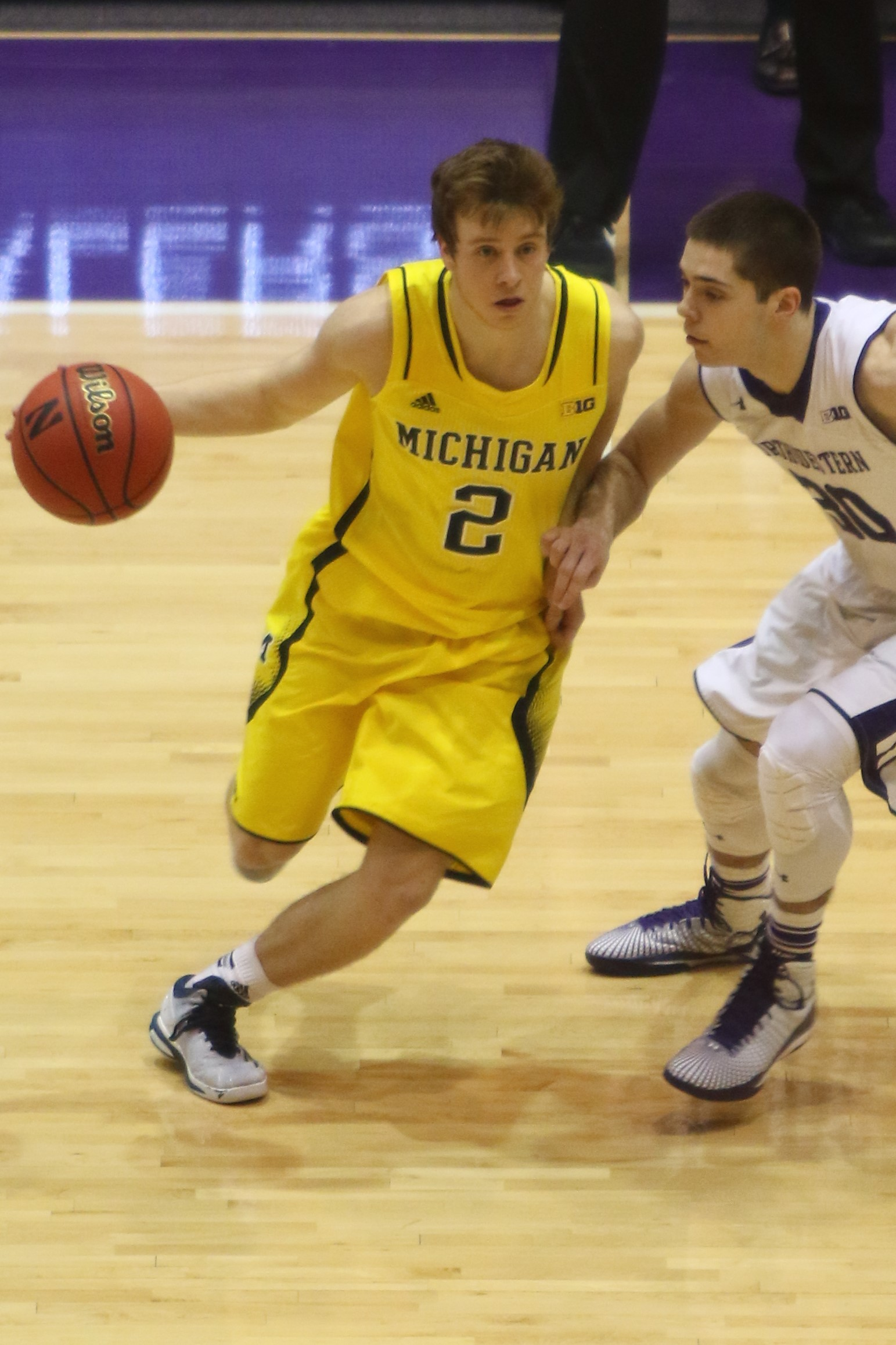
Caris LeVert (left) and Spike Albrecht were named co-captains

Michigan began the season ranked number 23 in the Coaches' Poll and number 24 in the AP Poll. In the Sports Illustrated preseason top 25 ranking Michigan was listed #25. ESPN's Jeff Goodman expected Michigan to be Wisconsin's main competition in the conference despite all of the talent it lost. Athlon Sports and Blue Ribbon College Basketball Yearbook ranked Michigan 23 in their preseason rankings. Bleacher Report listed Michigan at number 20.

Caris LeVert was a preseason All-Big Ten selection. He was an NBCSports.com Preseason All-American first team selection, a SB Nation, Sports Illustrated, Bleacher Report, Athlon Sports, Blue Ribbon College Basketball Yearbook, and CBSSports.com second team selection and a USA Today third team selection. He was also named to the Lute Olson Award and John R. Wooden Award preseason watchlists. LeVert also was named to the Oscar Robertson Trophy Watch List on November 24 and the Naismith Award Top 50 list on December 3.

In its preseason top 100 player rankings, ESPN ranked LeVert #13 and Walton #87. Prior to the season LeVert and Spike Albrecht were named co-captains.

== Roster ==
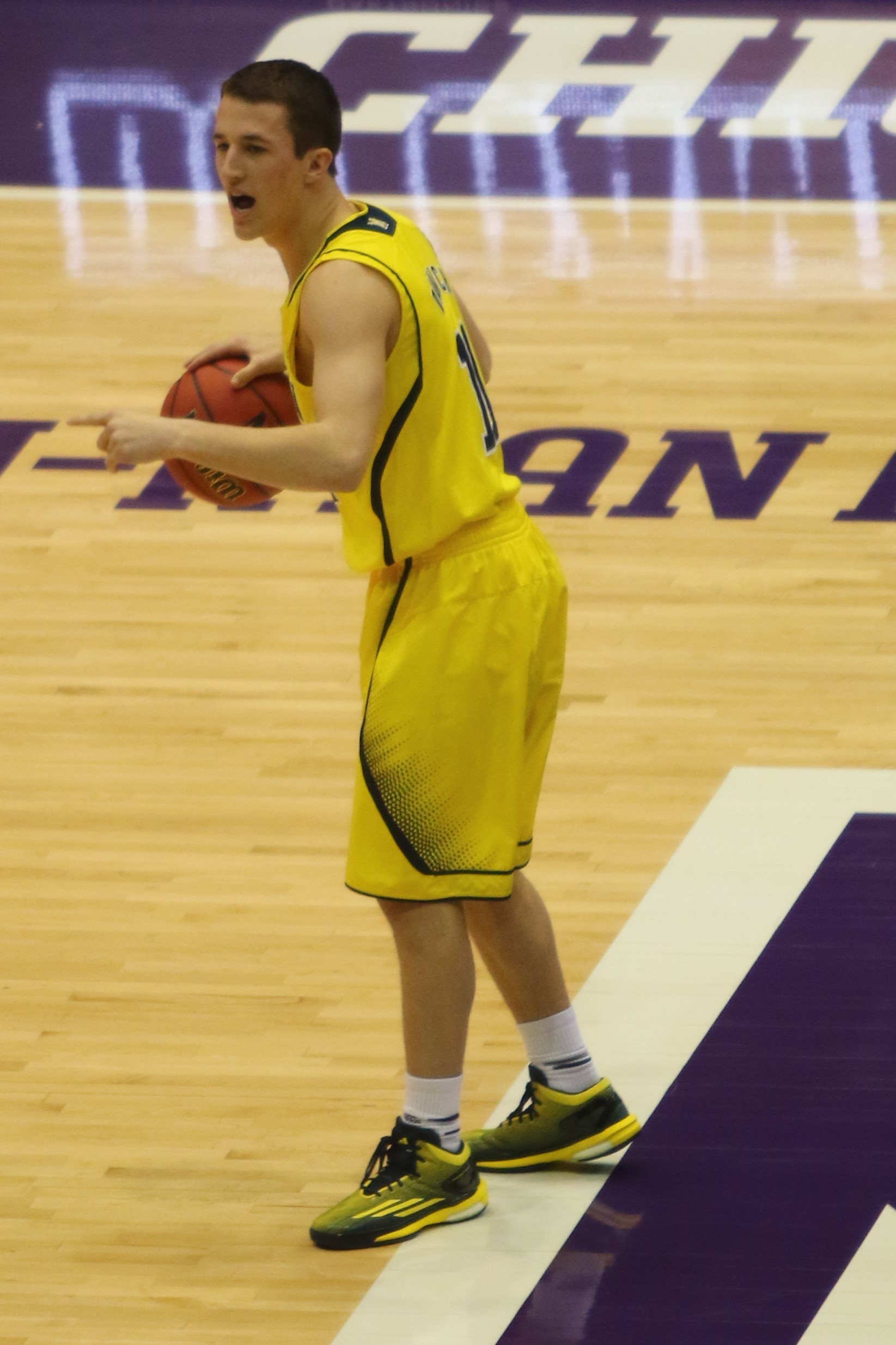
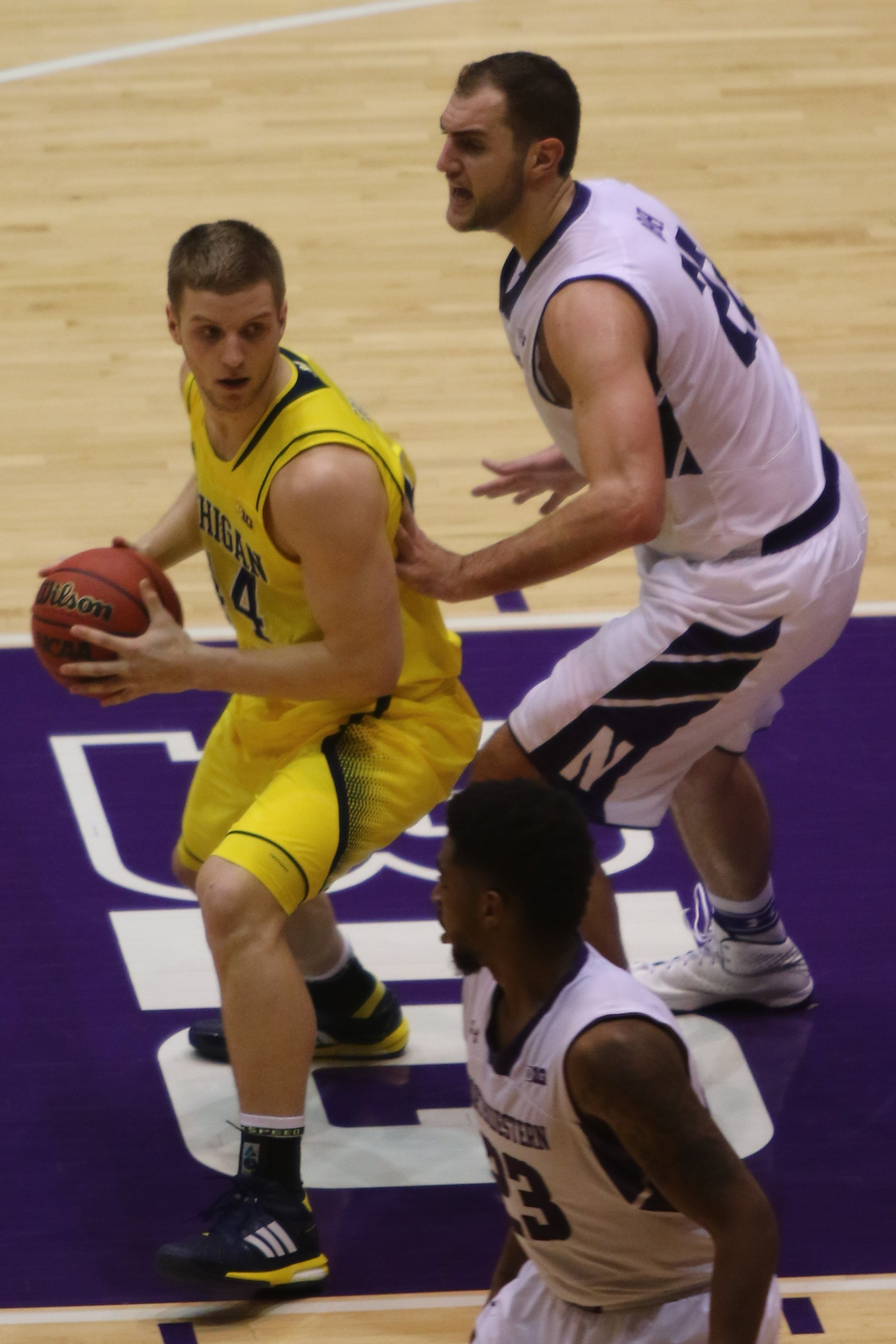
Andrew Dakich (left) almost redshirted and Max Bielfeldt (right) reclassified.

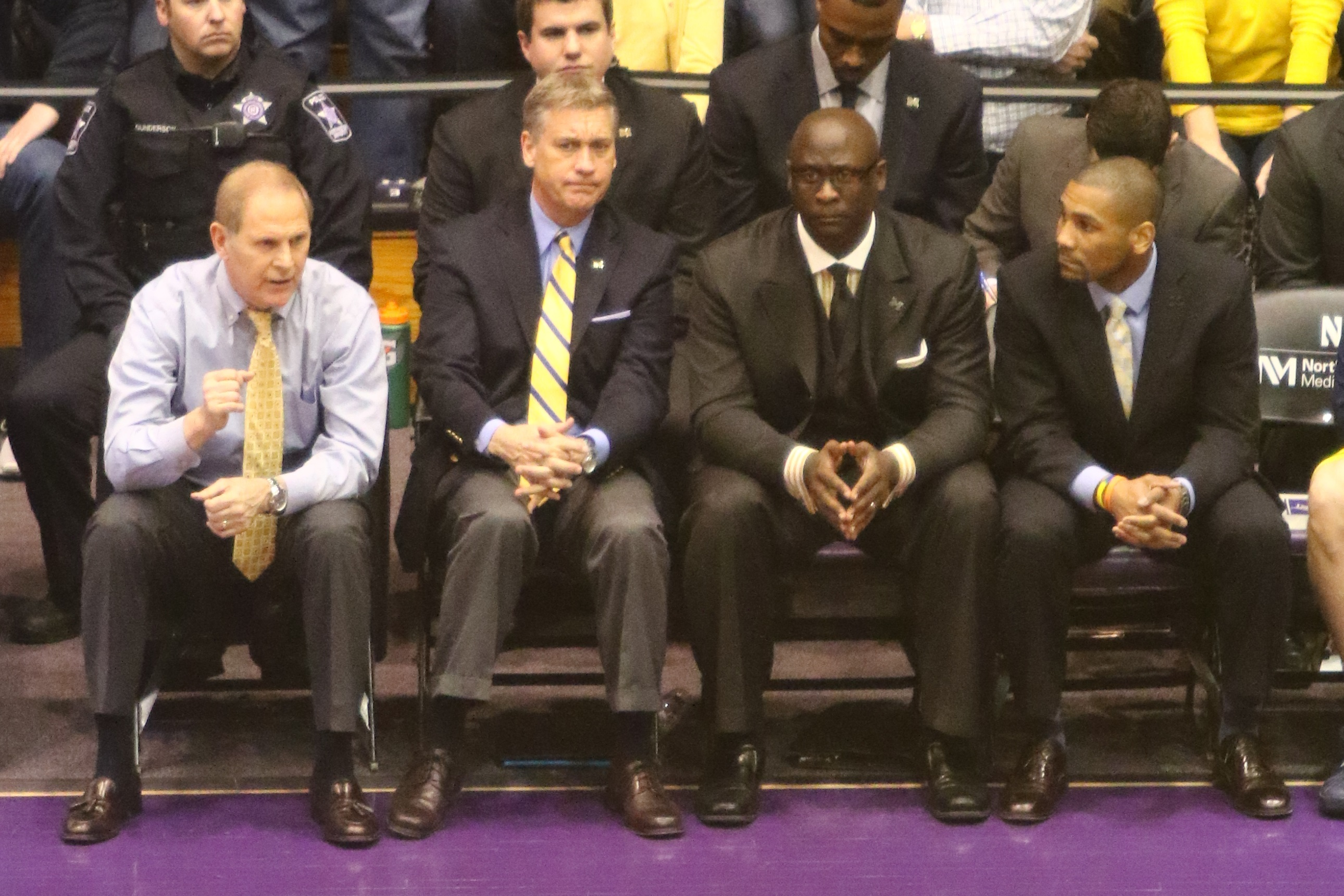
The coaching staff consisted of head coach John Beilein, Jeff Meyer, Bacari Alexander and LaVall Jordan

2014–15 Michigan Wolverines men's basketball team
Players
Coaches

Pos.	#	Name	Height	Weight	Year	Hometown
G	2	Spike Albrecht (C)	5 ft 11 in (1.8 m)	175 lb (79 kg)	Jr	Crown Point, IN
G/F	3	Kameron Chatman	6 ft 7 in (2.01 m)	210 lb (95 kg)	Fr	Portland, OR
F	5	D. J. Wilson (redshirt)	6 ft 9 in (2.06 m)	220 lb (100 kg)	Fr	Sacramento, CA
G	10	Derrick Walton	6 ft 0 in (1.83 m)	185 lb (84 kg)	So	Detroit, MI
G	11	Andrew Dakich (W)	6 ft 2 in (1.88 m)	190 lb (86 kg)	So	Zionsville, IN
G	12	Muhammad Ali Abdur-Rahkman	6 ft 4 in (1.93 m)	175 lb (79 kg)	Fr	Allentown, PA
F	20	Sean Lonergan (W)	6 ft 5 in (1.96 m)	200 lb (91 kg)	So	Fishers, IN
G/F	21	Zak Irvin	6 ft 6 in (1.98 m)	215 lb (98 kg)	So	Fishers, IN
G/F	22	Duncan Robinson (I) (redshirt)	6 ft 8 in (2.03 m)	190 lb (86 kg)	So	New Castle, NH
G	23	Caris LeVert (C)	6 ft 7 in (2.01 m)	200 lb (91 kg)	Jr	Pickerington, OH
G/F	24	Aubrey Dawkins	6 ft 6 in (1.98 m)	190 lb (86 kg)	Fr	Palo Alto, CA
G	30	Austin Hatch	6 ft 6 in (1.98 m)	215 lb (98 kg)	Fr	Fort Wayne, IN
F	32	Ricky Doyle	6 ft 9 in (2.06 m)	245 lb (111 kg)	Fr	Cape Coral, FL
F	34	Mark Donnal	6 ft 9 in (2.06 m)	240 lb (109 kg)	RS Fr	Monclova, OH
F	44	Max Bielfeldt	6 ft 7 in (2.01 m)	245 lb (111 kg)	Sr	Peoria, IL

Head coach

- John Beilein (Wheeling)

Assistant coach(es)

- Jeff Meyer (Taylor)
- LaVall Jordan (Butler)
- Bacari Alexander (Detroit Mercy)

Legend

- (C) Team captain
- (S) Suspended
- (I) Ineligible
- (W) Walk-on
- Injured
- Current redshirt

Roster

In July, the team reclassified Max Bielfeldt from a redshirt junior to a senior, which freed up Bielfeldt's scholarship for the Class of 2015, implying Bielfeldt would play his final year of eligibility elsewhere. In November, Beilein announced that the team would redshirt Andrew Dakich so that he could play a fifth year somewhere else. However, a pair of January backcourt injuries caused Dakich's services to be needed and he played instead of redshirting. D. J. Wilson missed most of the season due to a knee injury and was redshirted.

== Schedule ==
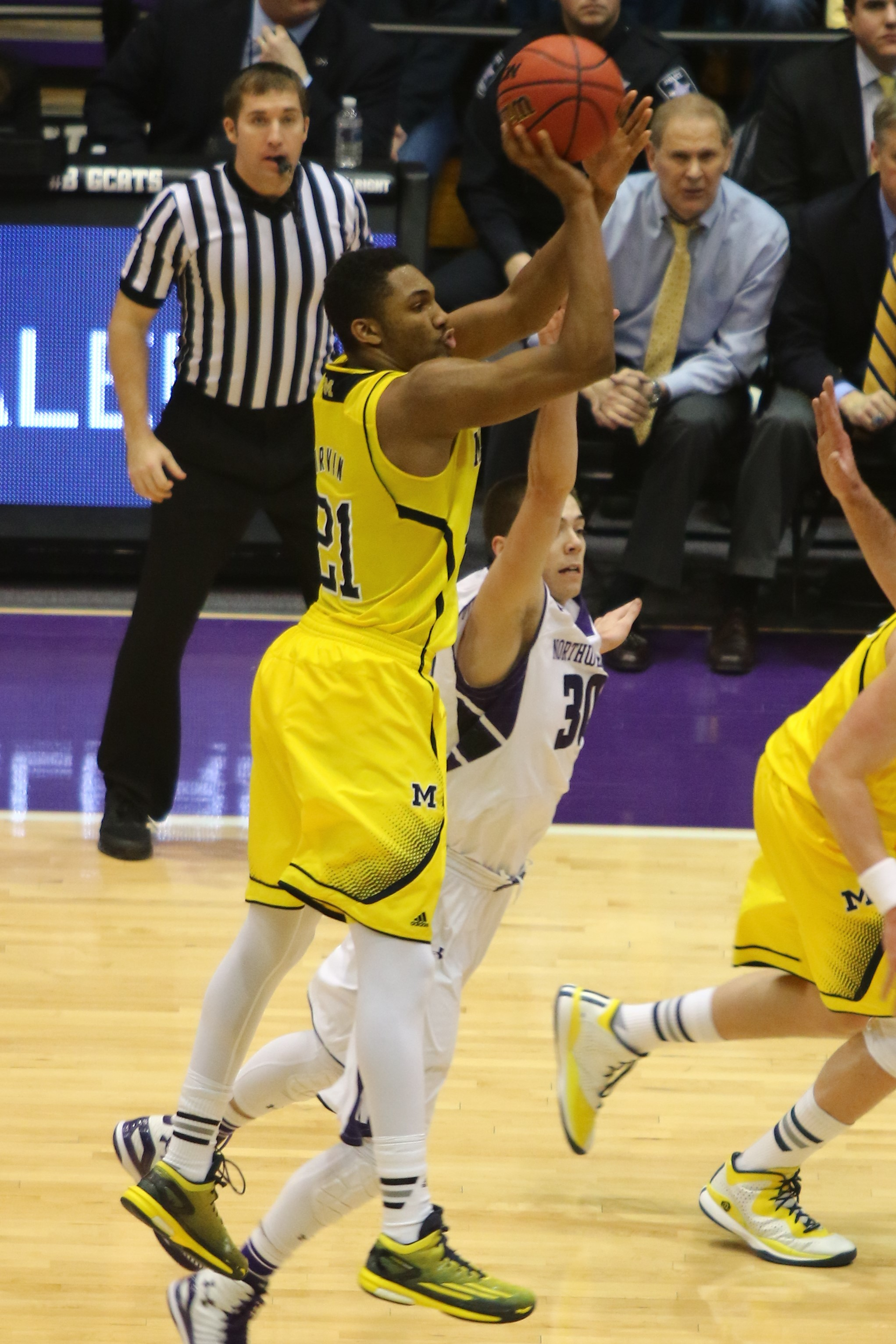
Zak Irvin posted several double-doubles for the team.

Michigan played the 2014–15 Arizona Wildcats on the road at McKale Center as part of their home-and-away that had begun at home against the 2013–14 Wildcats. Michigan played a home-and-away with the 2014–15 and 2015–16 SMU Mustangs with the 2014 game being played on December 20, 2014, at Crisler Center, and trip in December 2015 to face the 2015–16 Mustangs in Dallas. On July 15, the non-conference schedule was announced. On August 21, the team announced the conference schedule, which included three ESPN Super Tuesday broadcasts.

November

On November 10, Michigan won an exhibition game against Wayne State. The biggest storyline was that Austin Hatch scored for the team. Hatch had survived two plane crashes at ages 8 and 16; the first killed his mother and both of his siblings, and the second killed his father and stepmother and left him in a coma for two months. After raising its 2014 Big Ten Championship banner on November 15, Michigan opened its season with a 92–68 victory over Hillsdale College. The game was the first time the team had had three 20-point scorers (Derrick Walton-22, Zak Irvin-21, and Caris LeVert-20) since the 2011–12 team defeated the Oakland Golden Grizzlies on December 10, 2011, behind Trey Burke, Tim Hardaway Jr. and Evan Smotrycz. On November 17, the team opened the Progressive Legends Classic at home against Bucknell. The game was highlighted by Max Bielfeldt's career-high 18-point performance and Irvin's second consecutive 20 plus-point performance. In the second home game of the Legends Classic on November 20, Michigan faced a Detroit Titans team that was led by Juwan Howard Jr.—the son of former Michigan star Juwan Howard. Detroit led at the half and tied the score with 5:39 remaining before Michigan went on to win 71–62 despite 24 points and 8 rebounds from Howard. In the semifinals of the Legends Classic at the Barclays Center on November 24, Michigan defeated Oregon. The next day, Michigan lost to (#12 AP Poll/#11 Coaches Poll) Villanova in the championship game. This was the first meeting between the two teams since the quarterfinals of the 1985 NCAA tournament, which Villanova also won. Villanova went on a 9–0 run to end the first half, and led by as many as 13 points early in the second half. Michigan cut the lead to 35–31 following an 11–2 run. Michigan led by as many as eight points with just under six minutes left in the game, before Villanova came back to retake the lead for good with 13 seconds remaining. Caris LeVert helped lead the second half comeback scoring eight of his 16 points in the second half, including Michigan's final six points of the game. On November 29, the team defeated Nicholls State as five players scored in double figures.

December

On December 2, Michigan defeated Syracuse in an ACC-Big Ten Challenge game that went down to the wire. After blowing a 10-point second half lead Michigan needed a three point shot from Albrecht with 31 seconds remaining for the victory. On December 6, Michigan suffered its first home loss of the season to the New Jersey Institute of Technology by a 72–70 margin, despite a career-high 32 points by Levert. With the loss, Michigan's 30-game home win streak versus unranked opponents was snapped. NJIT shot 11-for-17 on its three-point shots in the game. The team lost its three subsequent games to Eastern Michigan, (#3) Arizona, and SMU. The loss to Eastern Michigan, which is separated from the University of Michigan by a 6-mile stretch of Washtenaw Avenue, ended a Big Ten-high 59-game streak without consecutive losses. Eastern Michigan was led in assists (6) by Michael Talley, son of Michigan Basketball point guard and alum Michael Talley Jr. The December 9 80–53 loss to #3 ranked Arizona was one point shy of being the largest defeat of the Beilein era. The December 20 SMU game marked the first career start by Ricky Doyle. On December 22, the team snapped its 4-game losing streak with a victory over Coppin State who was coached by Michael Grant, the brother of former Wolverine and Big Ten Conference Men's Basketball Player of the Year Gary Grant. One of the game's big storylines was the first regular season point by Austin Hatch. Doyle's game-high 16 points marked the first time he led the team in scoring. Michigan won its Big Ten Conference home opener against Illinois in overtime on December 30 on the day it announced Jim Harbaugh would become the new Michigan Wolverines football head coach. Aubrey Dawkins, who had a career total of 15 points entering the game, scored a game-high 20-points.

January

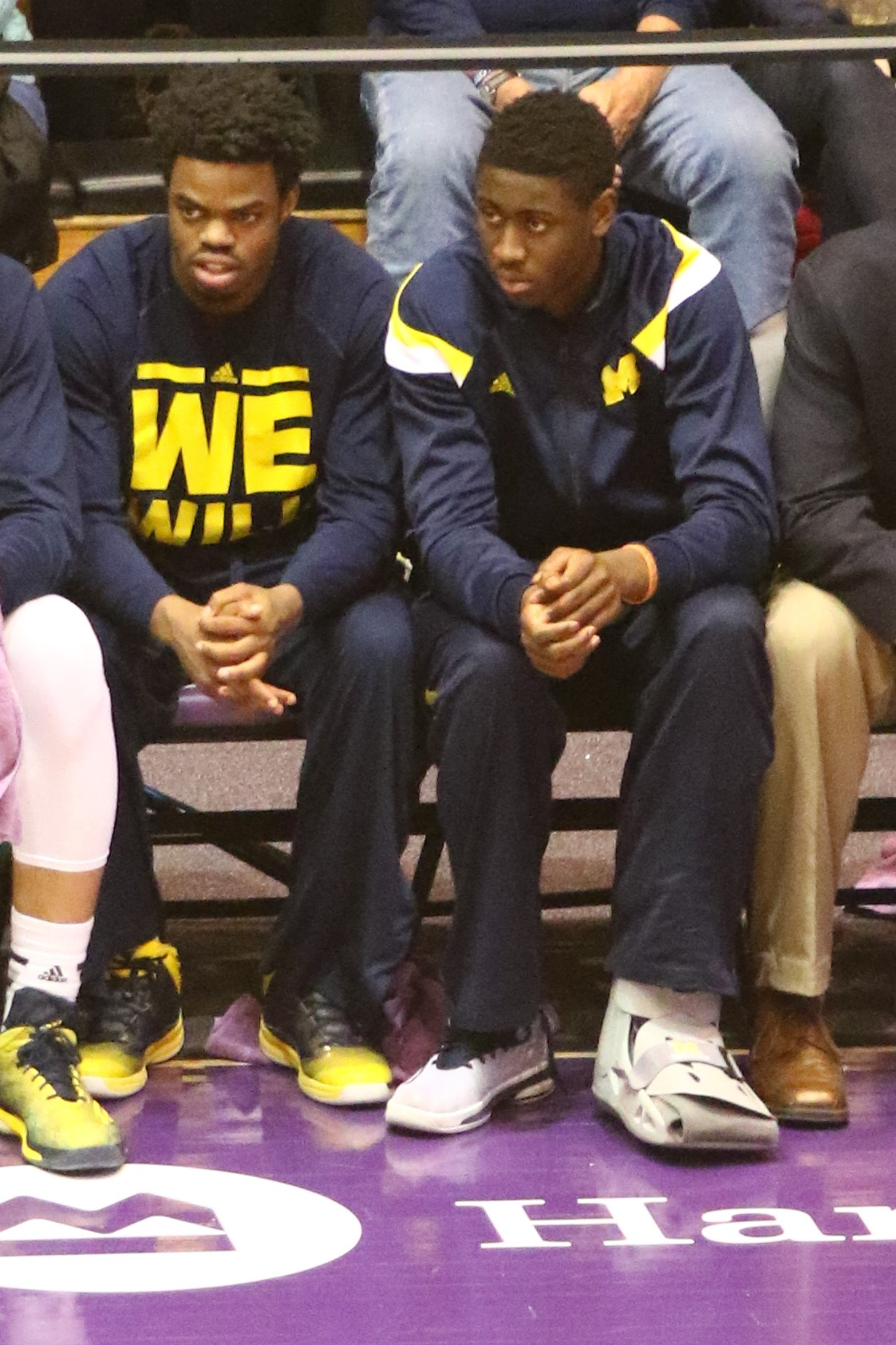
The team's season derailed when Derrick Walton and Caris LeVert were sidelined for the season in January.

Michigan lost to Purdue on January 3, by making only 4 second half field goals after taking an 8-point half time lead. The team defeated Penn State on January 6 with Albrecht in the starting lineup in place of Chatman. On January 10, the team wore throwback uniforms honoring the 1988–89 Michigan Wolverines men's basketball team that won the 1989 NCAA tournament. Michigan was down 49–40 with less than nine minutes remaining, before coming back to defeat Minnesota by a margin of 62–57. Michigan lost to (Receiving votes/#25) Ohio State on January 13. On January 17 Michigan defeated Northwestern, but lost LeVert for the season after he reinjured the foot that he had had surgery on the prior May. In the game, Muhammad-Ali Abdur-Rahkman made his first start (in place of an ailing Albrecht) and made the game winning three-point shot. At the time of his injury, LeVert led Michigan in scoring (14.9), rebounds (4.9), assists (3.7), steals (1.7) and minutes (35.8). Nonetheless, the team defeated Rutgers in its first game without LeVert and with Dawkins making his first start. With LeVert absent, Walton scored 10 of the team's 15 points as it rallied from a 42–37 deficit to assume a 52–44 lead with just 32.5 seconds left. On January 24, Michigan fell to (AP #6/Coaches #5) Wisconsin in overtime after Walton, who had a team-high 17 points, scored Michigan's final seven points, including a game-tying three-point shot with 1.3 seconds remaining in regulation. The game had been the featured College GameDay game of the week. On January 27 with Walton and Mark Donnal sidelined Michigan defeated Nebraska, as Irvin recorded his first career double-double, leading the team with 14 points and a career-high 12 rebounds. Eventually, Walton missed final 12 of the season due to a toe injury. Due to the backcourt injuries, Dakich burned his redshirt season. Michigan finished the first half of its conference schedule with a 6–3 record.

February

Michigan began February with 5 consecutive Big Ten Conference losses. On February 1, the team lost a rivalry game in overtime to Michigan State, despite career-high 18-point performances by Albrecht and Abdur-Rahkman and a career best 9-rebound performance by Max Bielfeld. On February 5 and February 8, Michigan lost to Iowa and Indiana. February 5 marked the return of Donnal to the lineup. On February 12 against Illinois, Michigan lost in overtime after surrendering a 7-point lead with a little more than 3 minutes remaining. Illinois finished the game on a 21–2 run that was only spoiled by Michigan free throws with 13 seconds remaining. The 17,087 in attendance established a record for the State Farm Center. On February 17, Michigan lost again to Michigan State. On February 22, Michigan ended its losing streak by defeating (#24/#23) Ohio State. On February 28, Michigan ended February with a loss to (#14/#14) Maryland in the first Big Ten Conference game between the two teams and Senior night for Maryland.

March

On March 3, Michigan tied a school record with its fifth overtime game of the season (the first multiple overtime game since March 20, 2006) against Northwestern on Northwestern's Senior night. Michigan gave up last second game-tying three-point shots by Tre Demps in both regulation and the first overtime before losing in double overtime, despite career-high 28-point and 21-point performances by Irvin and Dawkins, respectively. Irvin posted his own and the team's second double-double of the season. On March 7, Michigan won its Big Ten Conference finale against Rutgers to finish the regular season at 15–15 (8–10 Big Ten). The game marked career-high scoring efforts by Dawkins (31) and Chatman (13), career-high assist efforts by Bielfeldt (3) and Albrecht (9) and a career-high rebounding effort by Bielfeldt (13). Bielfeldt made his first career start on this Senior night effort. Freshmen team managers Jon Rubenstein and Ryan Kapustka played in the game. Dawkins' 31 points was the most by a Michigan freshman since Trey Burke had 32 in 2012 and his 8 three-pointers was the second most in school history, the most by a Wolverine since Glen Rice posted 8 in the 1989 NCAA tournament and the most by a Big Ten player during the season, earning Dawkins the final Big Ten Freshman of the Week honor. In the second round of the 2015 Big Ten Conference men's basketball tournament on March 12, Michigan defeated Illinois after splitting a pair of overtime games won by the home teams during the regular season. The game marked Michigan's ninth consecutive win in its opening round of the Big Ten Conference men's basketball tournament and Michigan's largest margin of victory over a conference opponent this season. In the quarterfinals of the Big Ten tournament on March 13, Michigan lost to No. 1 seeded Wisconsin, despite a double-double and game-high 21 points and 11 rebounds by Irvin.

Date time, TV	Rank^{#}	Opponent^{#}	Result	Record	High points	High rebounds	High assists	Site (attendance) city, state
Exhibition
Nov 10*; 7:00 pm	No. 24	Wayne State	W 86–43	–	16 – LeVert	6 – Chatman	6 – LeVert	Crisler Center (10,510); Ann Arbor, MI
Non-conference Regular Season
Nov 15*; 2:00 pm, ESPN3	No. 24	Hillsdale	W 92–68	1–0	22 – Walton	8 – LeVert	9 – LeVert	Crisler Center (12,707); Ann Arbor, MI
Nov 17*; 8:00 pm, BTN	No. 24	Bucknell; Legends Classic	W 77–53	2–0	23 – Irvin	8 – Walton	6 – Tied	Crisler Center (12,181); Ann Arbor, MI
Nov 20*; 6:00 pm, BTN	No. 24	Detroit; Legends Classic	W 71–62	3–0	21 – LeVert	9 – LeVert	4 – Albrecht	Crisler Center (11,812); Ann Arbor, MI
Nov 24*; 9:00 pm, ESPN3	No. 19	vs. Oregon; Legends Classic Semifinals	W 70–63	4–0	19 – Irvin	5 – Tied	3 – Tied	Barclays Center (8,465); Brooklyn, NY
Nov 25*; 10:00 pm, ESPN2	No. 19	vs. No. 12 Villanova; Legends Classic Championship	L 55–60	4–1	16 – LeVert	6 – LeVert	4 – Walton	Barclays Center (8,093); Brooklyn, NY
Nov 29*; 4:00 pm	No. 19	Nicholls State	W 91–62	5–1	24 – LeVert	8 – Chatman	7 – Albrecht	Crisler Center (11,139); Ann Arbor, MI
Dec 2*; 7:30 pm, ESPN	No. 17	Syracuse; ACC–Big Ten Challenge	W 68–65	6–1	18 – Irvin	9 – Chatman	9 – Albrecht	Crisler Center (12,707); Ann Arbor, MI
Dec 6*; 12:00 pm, BTN	No. 17	NJIT	L 70–72	6–2	32 – LeVert	6 – LeVert	3 – Walton	Crisler Center (12,226); Ann Arbor, MI
Dec 9*; 9:00 pm, ESPNU		Eastern Michigan	L 42–45	6–3	10 – Tied	6 – Walton	5 – Walton	Crisler Center (11,926); Ann Arbor, MI
Dec 13*; 6:15 pm, ESPN		at No. 3 Arizona	L 53–80	6–4	14 – Irvin	4 – Chatman	5 – Walton	McKale Center (14,655); Tucson, AZ
Dec 20*; 12:00 pm, ESPN2		SMU	L 51–62	6–5	17 – Irvin	5 – Tied	5 – LeVert	Crisler Center (12,221); Ann Arbor, MI
Dec 22*; 8:00 pm, BTN		Coppin State	W 72–56	7–5	16 – Doyle	8 – LeVert	9 – Walton	Crisler Center (11,989); Ann Arbor, MI
Big Ten Regular Season
Dec 30; 3:00 pm, ESPN2		Illinois	W 73–65 ^{OT}	8–5 (1–0)	20 – Dawkins	6 – Albrecht	5 – Tied	Crisler Center (12,707); Ann Arbor, MI
Jan 3; 2:15 pm, BTN		at Purdue	L 51–64	8–6 (1–1)	17 – Albrecht	5 – LeVert	3 – LeVert	Mackey Arena (11,271); West Lafayette, IN
Jan 6; 7:00 pm, BTN		at Penn State	W 73–64	9–6 (2–1)	18 – LeVert	9 – Irvin	6 – Albrecht	Bryce Jordan Center (5,342); University Park, PA
Jan 10; 1:00 pm, ESPNU		Minnesota	W 62–57	10–6 (3–1)	15 – Tied	6 – Doyle	3 – Walton	Crisler Center (12,707); Ann Arbor, MI
Jan 13; 7:00 pm, ESPN		at Ohio State	L 52–71	10–7 (3–2)	14 – LeVert	5 – Tied	2 – Tied	Value City Arena (15,548); Columbus, OH
Jan 17; 8:15 pm, BTN		Northwestern	W 56–54	11–7 (4–2)	18 – LeVert	6 – LeVert	7 – LeVert	Crisler Center (12,707); Ann Arbor, MI
Jan 20; 6:30 pm, BTN		at Rutgers	W 54–50	12–7 (5–2)	12 – Walton	8 – Bielfeldt	3 – Tied	The RAC (7,365); Piscataway, NJ
Jan 24; 7:00 pm, ESPN		No. 6 Wisconsin; College GameDay	L 64–69 ^{OT}	12–8 (5–3)	17 – Walton	5 – Tied	2 – Tied	Crisler Center (12,579); Ann Arbor, MI
Jan 27; 7:00 pm, ESPN		Nebraska	W 58–44	13–8 (6–3)	14 – Irvin	12 – Irvin	7 – Albrecht	Crisler Center (12,115); Ann Arbor, MI
Feb 1; 1:00 pm, CBS		at Michigan State; Rivalry	L 66–76 ^{OT}	13–9 (6–4)	18 – Tied	9 – Bielfeldt	3 – Irvin	Breslin Center (14,797); East Lansing, MI
Feb 5; 7:00 pm, ESPN		Iowa	L 54–72	13–10 (6–5)	16 – Dawkins	4 – Tied	5 – Albrecht	Crisler Center (12,490); Ann Arbor, MI
Feb 8; 1:00 pm, CBS		at Indiana	L 67–70	13–11 (6–6)	23 – Irvin	6 – Doyle	7 – Albrecht	Assembly Hall (17,472); Bloomington, IN
Feb 12; 9:00 pm, ESPN		at Illinois	L 52–64 ^{OT}	13–12 (6–7)	13 – Albrecht	8 – Irvin	5 – Albrecht	State Farm Center (17,087); Champaign, IL
Feb 17; 9:00 pm, ESPN		Michigan State; Rivalry	L 67–80	13–13 (6–8)	16 – Irvin	6 – Bielfeldt	5 – Albrecht	Crisler Center (12,502); Ann Arbor, MI
Feb 22; 1:00 pm, CBS		No. 24 Ohio State	W 64–57	14–13 (7–8)	16 – Albrecht	7 – Tied	5 – Albrecht	Crisler Center (12,618); Ann Arbor, MI
Feb 28; 12:00 pm, ESPN		at No. 14 Maryland	L 56–66	14–14 (7–9)	15 – Tied	9 – Doyle	3 – Irvin	Xfinity Center (17,950); College Park MD
Mar 3; 9:00 pm, BTN		at Northwestern	L 78–82 ^{2OT}	14–15 (7–10)	28 – Irvin	11 – Irvin	8 – Albrecht	Welsh-Ryan Arena (7,673); Evanston, IL
Mar 7; 2:15 pm, BTN		Rutgers	W 79–69	15–15 (8–10)	31 – Dawkins	11 – Bielfeldt	9 – Albrecht	Crisler Center (12,357); Ann Arbor, MI
Big Ten tournament
Mar 12; 12:00 pm, BTN		vs. Illinois; Second round	W 73–55	16–15	18 – Dawkins	8 – Abdur-Rahkman	6 – Irvin	United Center (16,028); Chicago, IL
Mar 13; 12:00 pm, ESPN		vs. No. 6 Wisconsin; Quarterfinals	L 60–71	16–16	21 – Irvin	11 – Irvin	4 – Bielfeldt	United Center (17,290); Chicago, IL
*Non-conference game. ^{#}Rankings from AP Poll. (#) Tournament seedings in parentheses. All times are in Eastern Time.

== Statistics ==
The team posted the following statistics:

Name	GP	GS	Min.	Avg.	FG	FGA	FG%	3FG	3FGA	3FG%	FT	FTA	FT%	OR	DR	RB	Avg.	Ast.	Avg.	PF	DQ	TO	Stl.	Blk.	Pts.	Avg.
Zak Irvin	32	32	1160	36.2	163	405	0.402	77	217	0.355	53	76	0.697	31	122	153	4.8	49	1.5	42	0	47	33	3	456	14.2
Caris LeVert	18	18	645	35.8	93	221	0.421	32	79	0.405	51	63	0.81	5	83	88	4.9	67	3.7	31	0	39	32	7	269	14.9
Spike Albrecht	31	18	991	32	78	193	0.404	35	96	0.365	42	46	0.913	4	68	72	2.3	121	3.9	49	1	41	27	1	233	7.5
Aubrey Dawkins	30	13	620	20.7	75	157	0.478	39	89	0.438	20	23	0.87	22	41	63	2.1	11	0.4	49	2	19	10	7	209	7
Derrick Walton Jr.	19	19	633	33.3	55	159	0.346	29	81	0.358	65	78	0.833	8	81	89	4.7	57	3	33	0	35	23	1	204	10.7
Ricky Doyle	31	19	565	18.2	74	121	0.612	0	0	–	42	69	0.609	46	52	98	3.2	8	0.3	57	0	18	7	12	190	6.1
Max Bielfeldt	30	3	434	14.5	62	129	0.481	8	30	0.267	22	32	0.688	43	65	108	3.6	14	0.5	41	0	20	8	7	154	5.1
Muhammad Ali Abdur-Rahkman	29	13	550	19	52	124	0.419	12	41	0.293	14	15	0.933	8	40	48	1.7	27	0.9	43	1	28	16	0	130	4.5
Kameron Chatman	32	15	486	15.2	42	132	0.318	10	38	0.263	21	31	0.677	20	61	81	2.5	22	0.7	46	0	29	13	6	115	3.6
Mark Donnal	29	10	309	10.7	35	67	0.522	7	19	0.368	22	31	0.71	26	36	62	2.1	4	0.1	45	0	9	4	10	99	3.4
Andrew Dakich	13	0	69	5.3	2	8	0.25	1	3	0.333	0	0	–	0	4	4	0.3	2	0.2	11	0	3	1	0	5	0.4
Sean Lonergan	17	0	57	3.4	2	2	1	0	0	–	0	0	–	1	4	5	0.3	0	0	4	0	2	0	0	4	0.2
D. J. Wilson	5	0	24	4.8	1	4	0.25	0	1	0	0	0	–	1	5	6	1.2	0	0	4	0	1	0	3	2	0.4
Austin Hatch	5	0	5	1	0	2	0	0	2	0	1	3	0.333	0	0	0	0	0	0	0	0	1	0	0	1	0.2
Ryan Kapustka	1	0	1	1	0	0	–	0	0	–	0	0	–	0	0	0	0	0	0	0	0	0	0	0	0	0
Jon Rubenstein	1	0	1	1	0	0	–	0	0	–	0	1	0	0	0	0	0	0	0	0	0	0	0	0	0	0
TEAM	32													52	37	89	2.8					14				
Season Total	32	–	–	–	734	1724	0.426	250	696	0.359	353	468	0.754	267	699	966	30.2	382	11.9	455	4	306	174	57	2071	64.7
Opponents	32	–	–	–	764	1702	0.449	208	606	0.343	310	444	0.698	310	780	1090	34.1	410	12.8	502	–	387	142	95	2046	63.9

== Rankings ==
Ranking movements Legend: ██ Increase in ranking ██ Decrease in ranking — = Not ranked RV = Received votes
	Week																				
Poll	Pre	1	2	3	4	5	6	7	8	9	10	11	12	13	14	15	16	17	18	19	Final
AP	24	24	19	17	RV	—	—	—	—	—	—	—	—	—	—	—	—	—	—	—	Not released
Coaches'	23	22	18	16	RV	—	—	—	—	—	—	—	—	—	—	—	—	—	—	—	—

== Awards ==
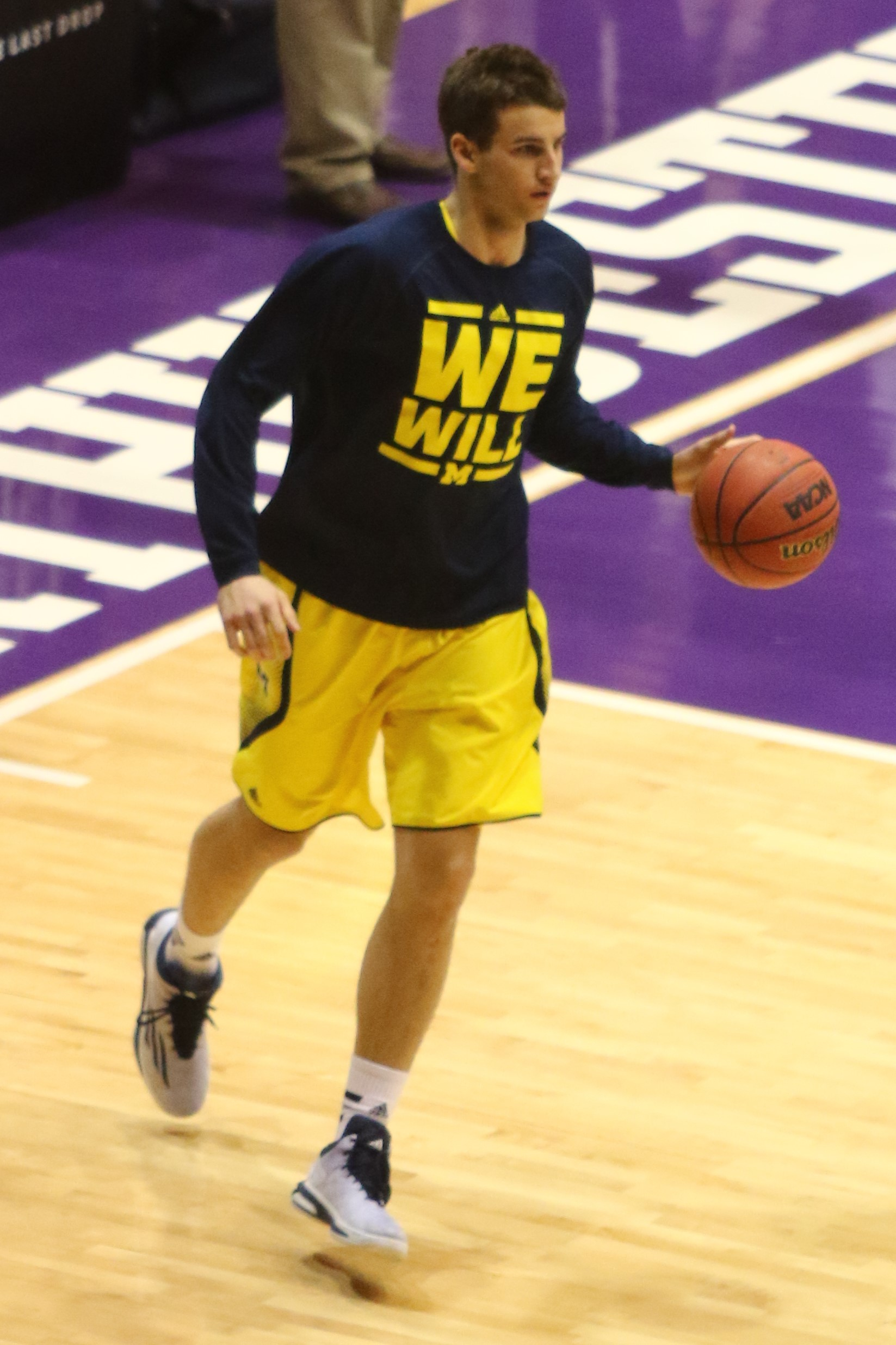
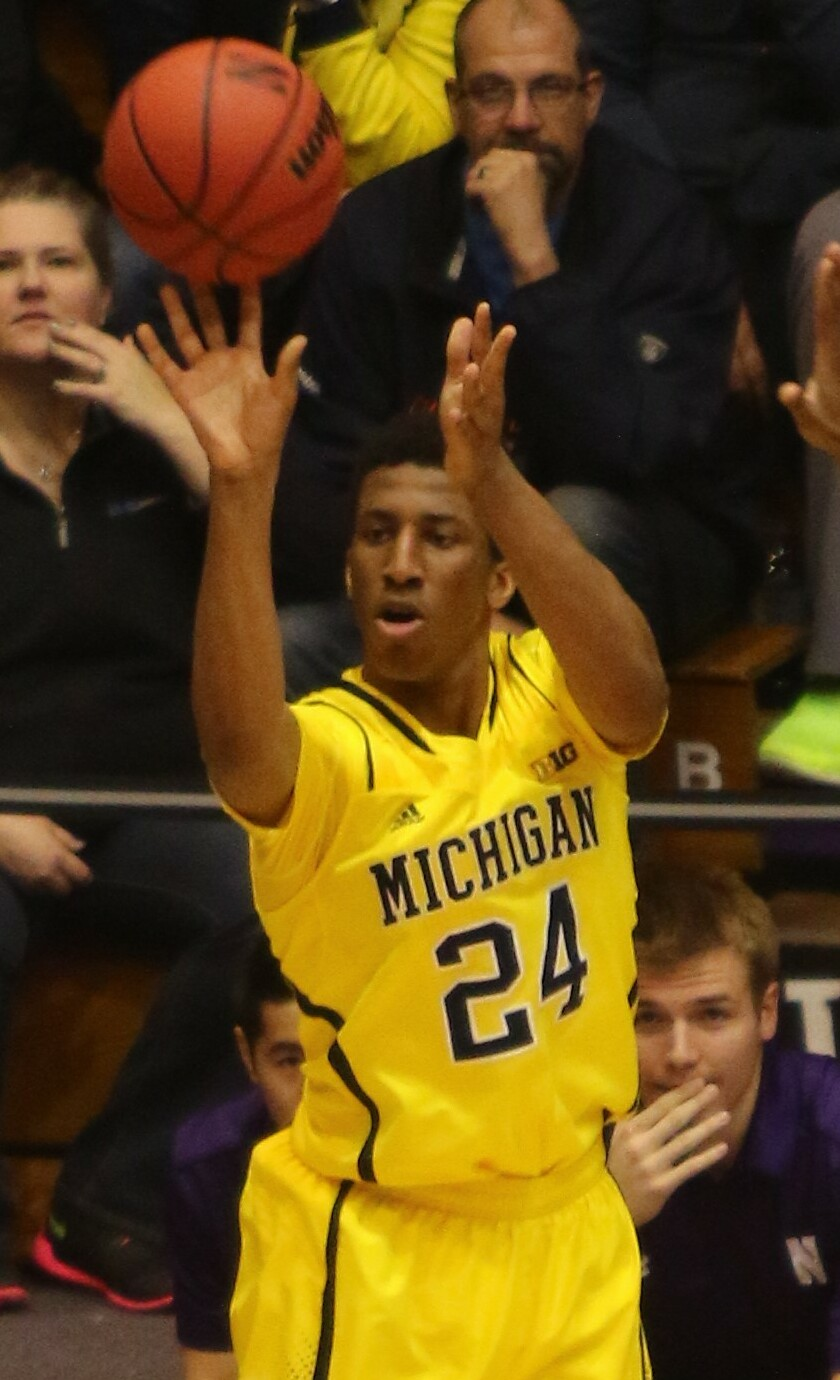
Austin Hatch (left) was recognized by the U.S. Basketball Writers Association's with its Most Courageous Award for 2015. Aubrey Dawkins (right) earned the final Big Ten Freshman of the Week honor of the season.

The United States Basketball Writers Association named Michigan's Austin Hatch as its recipient for the men's version of its Most Courageous Award for 2015. Dawkins earned the final Big Ten Freshman of the Week honor on March 9.

== Postseason ==
Michigan did not participate in any postseason tournaments, ending a streak of four consecutive NCAA Division I men's basketball tournament appearances. Following the season, Spike Albrecht had offseason surgery on his right hip to correct for a genetic condition that may also necessitate left hip surgery. Albrecht and Irvin were voted team co-MVPs. On April 21, LeVert announced that he would return for his senior season.

=== Team players drafted into the NBA ===
Year	Round	Pick	Overall	Player	NBA Club
2016	1	20	20	Caris LeVert	Indiana Pacers
2017	1	17	17	D. J. Wilson	Milwaukee Bucks
