= Aubrey Dawkins =

American basketball player (born 1995)

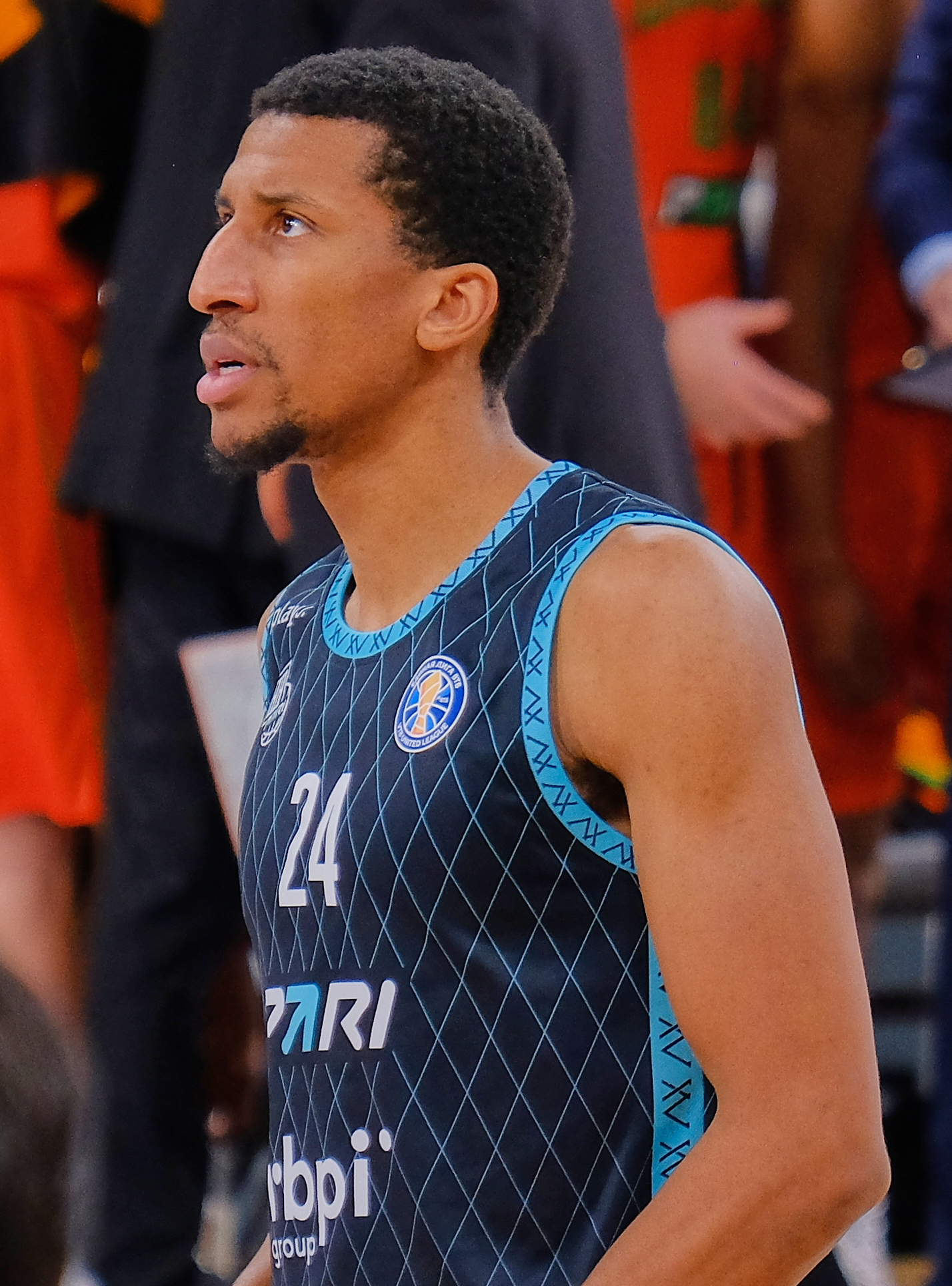
- Dawkins with Nizhny Novgorod in 2024

No. 24 – BCM Gravelines-Dunkerque
- Position: Shooting guard / small forward
- League: LNB Élite

Personal information
- Born: May 8, 1995 (age 31) Durham, North Carolina, US
- Listed height: 6 ft 6 in (1.98 m)
- Listed weight: 205 lb (93 kg)

Career information
- High school: Palo Alto (Palo Alto, California); New Hampton Prep (New Hampton, New Hampshire)
- College: Michigan (2014–2016); UCF (2018–2019)
- NBA draft: 2019: undrafted
- Playing career: 2019–present

Career history
- 2019–2020: Erie BayHawks
- 2020–2021: BG Göttingen
- 2021–2022: Türk Telekom
- 2022–2023: NBA G League Ignite
- 2023: Frutti Extra Bursaspor
- 2024: KK Studentski centar
- 2024–2025: BC Nizhny Novgorod
- 2025: Würzburg Baskets
- 2025–2026: APU Udine
- 2026–present: BCM Gravelines-Dunkerque

Career highlights
- Montenegrin Cup winner (2024); ABA League Supercup winner (2023); Second-team All-AAC (2019)
- Stats at Basketball Reference

Aubrey Lafell Dawkins (born May 8, 1995) is an American professional basketball player for BCM Gravelines-Dunkerque of the LNB Élite. He played college basketball for the UCF Knights, transferring to UCF after completing his sophomore season for the 2015–16 Michigan Wolverines. He is the son of Johnny Dawkins who became the UCF coach following the 2015–16 NCAA Division I men's basketball season.

Dawkins was raised in North Carolina until spending his high school years in Northern California at St. Francis High School and Palo Alto High School and a postgraduate year in New England at New Hampton Prep. As a collegiate freshman for the 2014–15 Wolverines, he began the season on the bench, but became a starter when injuries plagued the team in January 2015. In his more prominent role later in the season, Dawkins led the 2014–15 Big Ten Conference in effective field goal percentage and true shooting percentage during conference play.

== Early life ==
Dawkins was born in Durham, North Carolina, the youngest of the four children of Tracy and Johnny Dawkins. The elder Dawkins spent 11 years on Mike Krzyzewski's coaching staff at Duke. The family moved to California in 2008 when his father became the Stanford Cardinal men's basketball head coach. Dawkins was a freshman at St. Francis High School of Mountain View, California in 2009. By the time he began his sophomore season he stood at 5 feet 8 inches (1.73 m). As a junior, Dawkins transferred to Palo Alto High School in Palo Alto, California. That year he earned 2012 All-San Jose Mercury News boys basketball third team recognition. As a senior, he stood at 6 feet 5 inches (1.96 m), By January of his senior season he had not received any scholarship offers. That year he averaged 18.8 points and 7.0 rebounds and was on the 2013 All-San Jose Mercury News boys basketball first team along with Aaron Gordon.

After graduating, Dawkins did a postgraduate year at the New Hampton School in New Hampton, New Hampshire where he averaged 12.3 points and 3.6 rebounds before receiving a late scholarship offer from Michigan. His grades were not sufficient to pursue a scholarship at Stanford and despite his relationship with Chris Collins, Northwestern was not interested in Dawkins given their commitments from wings Vic Law and Scottie Lindsey. While at New Hampton, he was being recruited by Steve Donahue of Boston College, but Donahue left Boston College in 2014 and recommended Dawkins to Beilein. Before Michigan stepped in, it appeared that he would have committed to Dayton, although he was also considering Utah State, Pepperdine as well as Montana, and Rhode Island was showing a strong interest. In fact, during the 2014 NCAA Division I men's basketball tournament, Dawkins attended the Sweet 16 round to watch his father's Stanford Cardinal play Dayton in the South Regional on March 27. Dawkins accepted a recruiting visit to Michigan in early April 2014 when he received his scholarship offer. He made his verbal commitment on April 28 and signed his National Letter of Intent on May 9.

College recruiting
Name	Hometown	School	Height	Weight	Commit date
Aubrey Dawkins; SG/SF	Palo Alto, CA	New Hampton School (NH)	6 ft 4 in (1.93 m)	180 lb (82 kg)	Apr 28, 2014
Aubrey Dawkins; SG/SF	Recruit ratings: Scout: Rivals: 247Sports: ESPN: (76)				
Overall recruit ranking:
Note: In many cases, Scout, Rivals, 247Sports, On3, and ESPN may conflict in their listings of height and weight.; In these cases, the average was taken. ESPN grades are on a 100-point scale.; Sources: "Michigan 2014 Basketball Commitments". Rivals.; "2014 Michigan Basketball Commits". Scout.; "ESPN Recruiting Nation Basketball". ESPN.; "Scout.com Team Recruiting Rankings". Scout.; "2014 Team Ranking". Rivals.

== College career ==
=== Freshman year ===
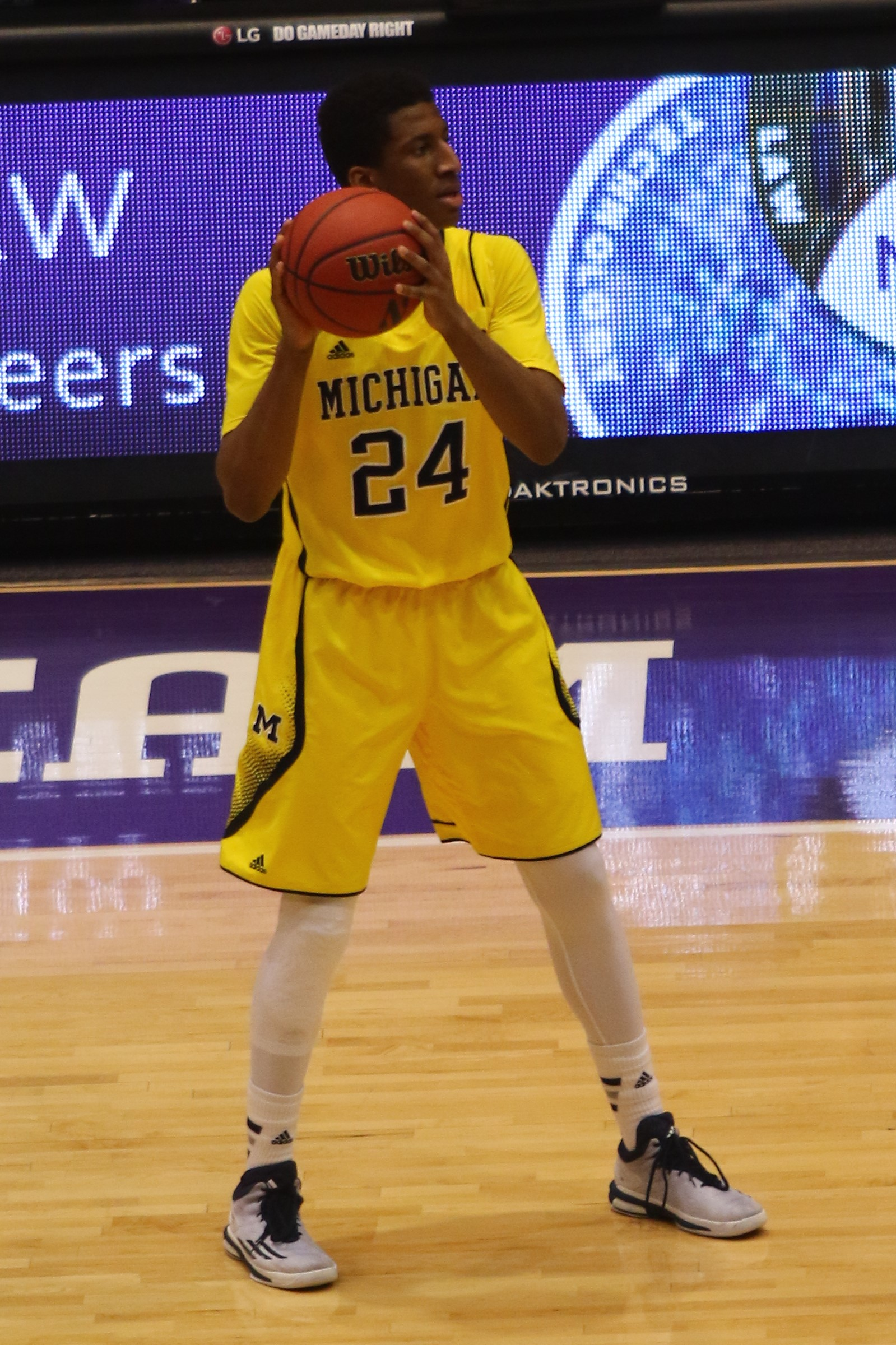
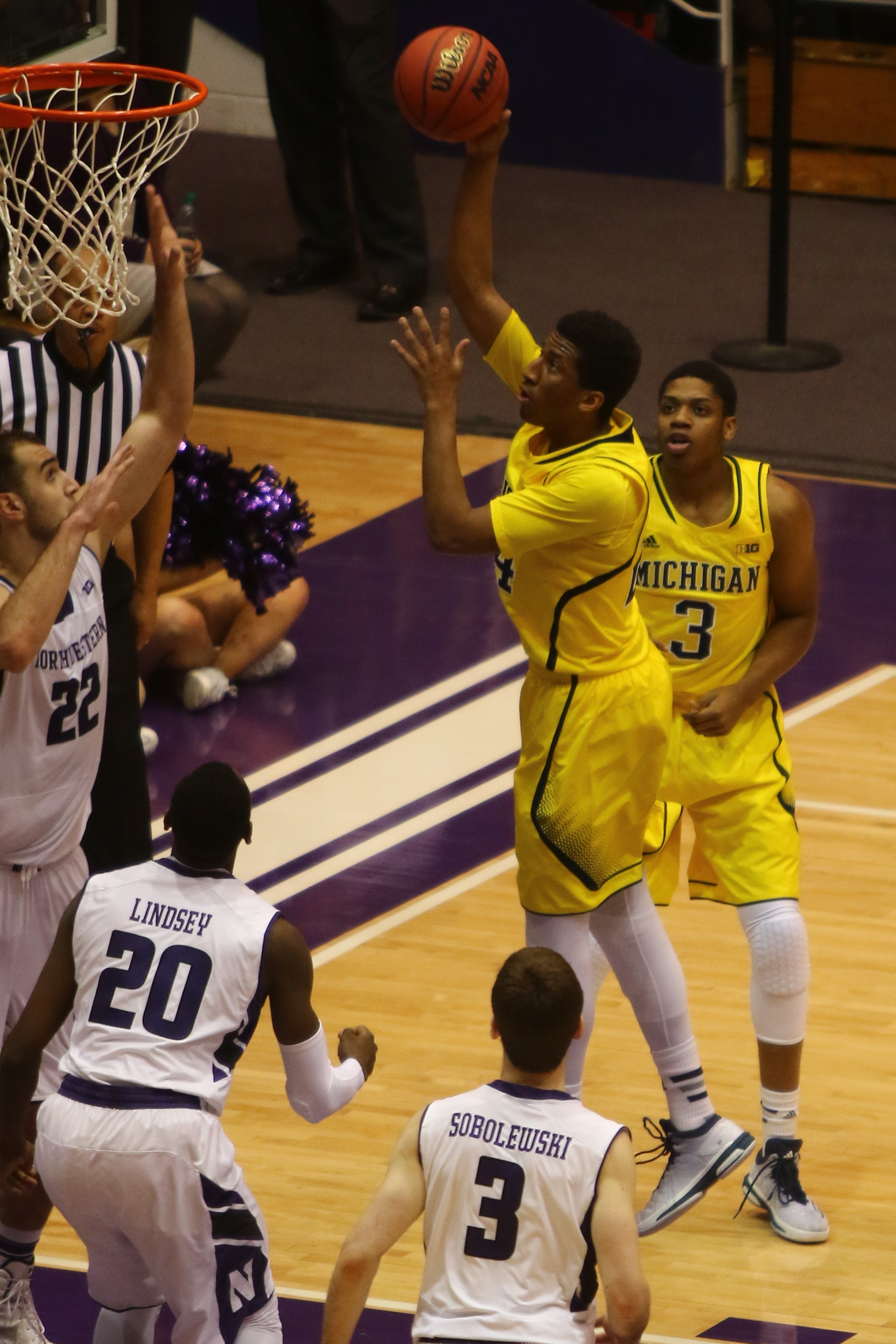
Dawkins for the 2014–15 Wolverines

The 2013–14 Michigan Wolverines men's basketball team had been outright champions of 2013–14 Big Ten Conference and reached the Elite Eight round of the 2014 NCAA Division I men's basketball tournament. However, they lost three players to the 2014 NBA draft: Nik Stauskas, Mitch McGary and Glenn Robinson III. Dawkins enrolled at the University of Michigan on June 20, 2014 and became roommates with teammate Muhammad-Ali Abdur-Rahkman. Dawkins made his collegiate debut for Michigan against Hillsdale on November 15, along with six other true freshmen and a redshirt freshman. He posted 3 points and 3 rebounds in 6 minutes of playing time.

The 2014–15 team won its Big Ten Conference home opener against Illinois in overtime on December 30, 2014, on the day it announced Jim Harbaugh would become the new Michigan Wolverines football head coach. Aubrey Dawkins, who had a career total of 15 points entering the game, scored a game-high 20-points, including a 5-for-5 three-point field goal effort. On January 17 Michigan defeated Northwestern, but lost leading scorer Caris LeVert for the season. The team defeated Rutgers on January 20, with Dawkins in the starting lineup for the first time in LeVert's place, as was expected upon news of the LeVert injury.

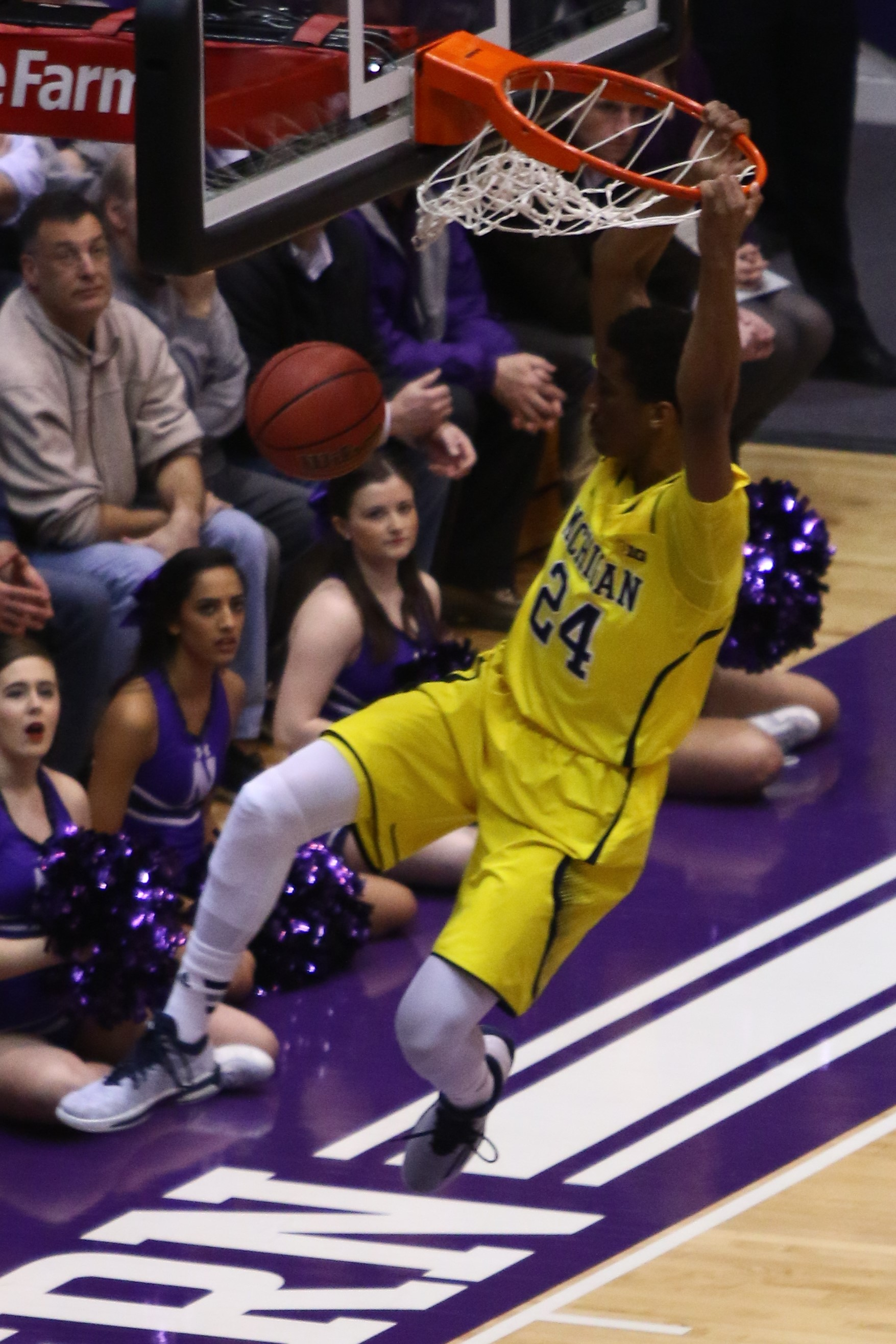
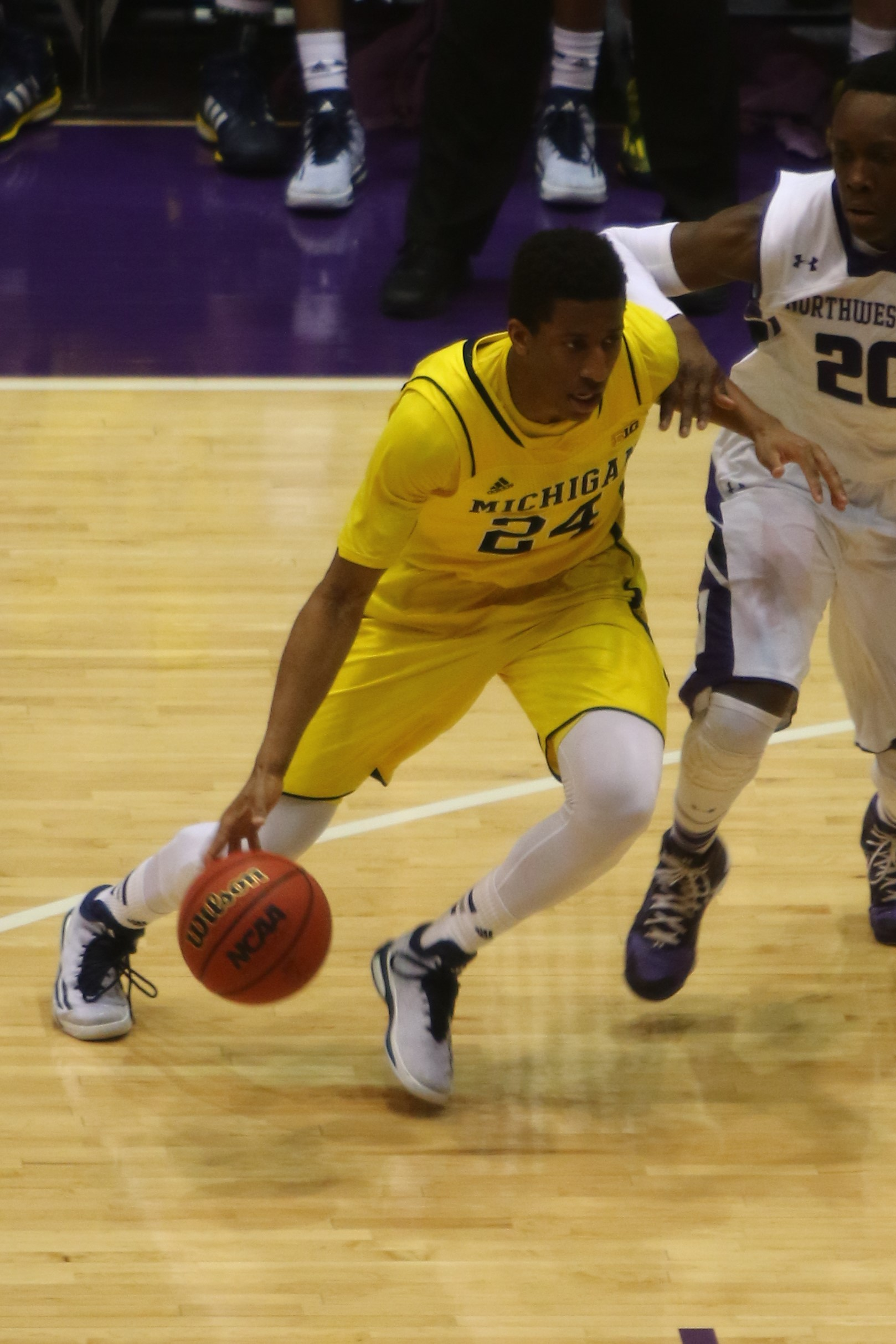
Dawkins for the 2014–15 Wolverines

On March 3 against Northwestern, Dawkins posted a career-high 21 points in a 49-minute double overtime appearance. On March 7, Michigan won its Big Ten Conference finale against Rutgers with a career-high scoring effort by Dawkins (31). The 31 points was the most by a Michigan freshman since Trey Burke posted 32 against Minnesota on March 9, 2012, in the 2012 Big Ten Conference men's basketball tournament. The 31-point effort included eight three-point field goals (on 11 attempts), the second most ever by a Wolverine, the most by a Wolverine since Glen Rice posted 8 on March 23, 1989, vs. North Carolina in the 1989 NCAA Division I men's basketball tournament and the most by a Big Ten player during the 2014–15 NCAA Division I men's basketball season, earning Dawkins the final Big Ten Freshman of the Week honor for the 2014–15 Big Ten Conference men's basketball season. At the time of the honor, Michigan head coach John Beilein noted that over the course of the season, he and his staff had worked with Dawkins to reconstruct the delivery of his jump shot: "He came in with an extremely high arch and a slow release...He's really done a great job of speeding up his delivery, lowering his arch..." On March 12, Dawkins continued his hot streak with a team-high 18 points against Illinois in the second round of the 2015 Big Ten Conference men's basketball tournament to help Michigan extend its streak of opening round wins in the tournament to 9. His performance included 8 consecutive points during Michigan's 23–4 run to end the first half and two memorable dunks. For conference play of the 2014–15 Big Ten Conference men's basketball season, Dawkins led the league in both Effective field goal percentage and True shooting percentage, but that season did not show strengths in other aspects of the game such as assists, rebounding, defense and drawing fouls. By the following July, Dawkins put on 15 pounds (6.80 kg) pounds.

=== Sophomore year ===
Dawkins began the season with 15 points on 6–of–7 shooting, including 2–of–3 3-point shooting and a highlight reel one-handed offensive rebound dunk as well as a career-high and game-high 6 rebounds as a starter against Northern Michigan. On November 20 against Xavier, Dawkins posted a career high of 6 rebounds. Dawkins finished the season 5th in the 2015–16 Big Ten Conference in three point shooting percentage (3rd in conference games). On April 6, 2016, he transferred to play for the UCF Knights, where his father had been named head coach two weeks prior. Dawkins left Michigan with a 43.9% three point shooting percentage. Dawkins sat out a full season due to NCAA eligibility rules. His playing time had declined during his sophomore season where he was battling Zak Irvin, Duncan Robinson and Kameron Chatman for playing time.

=== UCF ===
After sitting out a full season, Dawkins suffered a season-ending injury before the 2017–18 NCAA Division I men's basketball season. He debuted for the 2018–19 Knights on November 6, 2018, with a 16-point, 10-rebound double-double against Rider. His first 20-point performance for UCF came on November 18, when he posted 21 points, including five three-point shots, in a win over Western Kentucky. On December 16, he posted his second double-double against Stetson (19 points and 13 rebounds, a career high). On March 2, Dawkins contributed 11 points as UCF defeated (#8 AP Poll/#6 Coaches Poll) Houston at Fertitta Center stopping the nation's longest home winning streak at 33. With the win UCF entered the AP Poll for the first time since the 2010–11 UCF Knights spent four weeks in the poll peaking at 19. On March 9, Dawkins posted a career-high 36 points and 11 rebounds against Temple. Dawkins was named to the 2018–19 All-American Athletic Conference 2nd team. On March 24, in the round of 32 of the 2019 NCAA Division I men's basketball tournament, Dawkins posted a game-high 32 points as the No. 9 seed Knights nearly upset the No. 1 seed Duke Blue Devils. Dawkins missed a potential go ahead layup in the final seconds resulting in a 77–76 loss.

Following Central Florida's loss in the 2019 NCAA men's basketball tournament, Dawkins announced his intention to forgo his final season of collegiate eligibility and declare for the 2019 NBA draft, where he was projected to be a second round selection.

== Professional career ==
=== Erie BayHawks (2019–2020) ===
After going undrafted, Dawkins signed an Exhibit 10 contract with the New Orleans Pelicans on June 21, 2019. On October 26, 2019, Dawkins was included in the training camp roster of the Erie BayHawks. Dawkins missed the first six games of the season with an injury. He averaged 9.3 points, 3.5 rebounds and 1.1 assists per game.

=== BG Göttingen (2020–2021) ===
On July 31, 2020, Dawkins signed with BG Göttingen of the Basketball Bundesliga.

=== Türk Telekom (2021–2022) ===
On September 15, 2021, Dawkins signed with Türk Telekom of the BSL.

=== NBA G League Ignite (2022–2023) ===
On September 28, 2022, Dawkins signed with the NBA G League Ignite.

=== Bursaspor (2023) ===
On January 26, 2023, he signed with Frutti Extra Bursaspor of the Turkish Basketbol Süper Ligi (BSL).

=== Würzburg Baskets (2025) ===
On January 8, 2025, Dawkins signed with Würzburg Baskets of the Basketball Bundesliga.

=== APU Udine (2025-2026) ===
On June 27, 2025, Dawkins signed with newly promoted team, APU Udine of the LBA.

=== Gravelines-Dunkerque (2026-present) ===
On June 30, 2026, Dawkins signed with Gravelines-Dunkerque of the LNB Elite.

== Career statistics ==
Legend
GP	Games played	GS	Games started	MPG	Minutes per game
FG%	Field goal percentage	3P%	3-point field goal percentage	FT%	Free throw percentage
RPG	Rebounds per game	APG	Assists per game	SPG	Steals per game
BPG	Blocks per game	PPG	Points per game	**Bold**	Career high

=== College ===
Year	Team	GP	GS	MPG	FG%	3P%	FT%	RPG	APG	SPG	BPG	PPG
2014–15	Michigan	30	13	20.7	.478	.438	**.870**	2.1	.4	.3	.2	7.0
2015–16	Michigan	**36**	9	15.8	**.500**	**.440**	.724	2.5	.5	.4	.1	6.5
2018–19	UCF	33	**33**	**33.4**	.463	.403	.835	**5.0**	**1.4**	**1.0**	**.3**	**15.6**
Career		99	55	23.1	.475	.422	.819	3.2	.8	.6	.2	9.7

== Personal life ==
He is the son of former Duke Naismith College Player of the Year, National Basketball Association point guard, former Stanford head coach and current University of Central Florida head coach Johnny Dawkins.

== See also ==
- Michigan Wolverines men's basketball statistical leaders
