= NCAA drug testing =

The NCAA's drug testing program exists to "protect players who play by the rules by playing clean." The NCAA adopted its drug testing program in 1986, the year after the executive committee formed the Special NCAA Committee on Drug Testing. The drug test ranges from testing player-enhancement drugs to marijuana. A student failing a drug test loses one year of eligibility and is not allowed to compete in events for the first offense.^{[2]} However, not all students are tested because they are selected at random, but students are subject to be tested at any point in the year after the year-round testing program was adopted in 1990.^{[3]} Of the 400,000 athletes competing in the NCAA, around 11,000 drug tests were administered in 2008–09 when the last statistics were available.^{[4]} That number is expected to increase as drugs become more prevalent and easily accessible year by year.

== History ==
The National Collegiate Athletic Association did not start drug testing athletes until 1986, and even then it was only athletes or teams that made it to championship or bowl games. Although athletes were not tested until 1986 in the year 1970 the NCAA council founded a drug education committee. “The Drug Education Committee conducts a survey of 1,000 male student-athletes in the Big Ten Conference; 40 percent of respondents said that drug use was a slight or growing problem among varsity athletes”. In 1986 NCAA drug-testing program was adopted at the NCAA convention. The drug testing started that following fall with only championships and bowl games. The following year a Stanford diver filed a lawsuit claiming that this drug testing policy violated his privacy rights. The California Supreme Court ruled in favor of the NCAA in the privacy-rights lawsuit, saying the Association was "well within its legal rights" in adopting a drug-testing program. In 2006 the year-round testing program was expanded into the summer months. That same year the Division III Presidents Council approved a two-year drug-education and testing pilot program. “Today, 90 percent of Division I, 65 percent of Division II and 21 percent of Division III schools conduct their own drug-testing programs in addition to the NCAA’s”.

== Regulations ==
The 2014–15 list of NCAA banned drugs includes the following classes: stimulants (except for phenylephrine and pseudoephedrine, which are permitted); anabolic agents; diuretics and other masking agents; "street drugs" (the NCAA gives as examples heroin, marijuana, tetrahydrocannabinol (THC), and synthetic cannabinoids); peptide hormones and analogues; anti-estrogens, and beta2-adrenergic agonistz. Alcohol and beta blockers are also banned for rifle only. The NCAA also bans "any substance chemically related to these classes."

The penalties differ form and NCAA issued drug test and an individual school issued drug test. “The penalty for positive tests of both performance-enhancing and street drugs is strict and automatic. Student-athletes lose one full year of eligibility for the first offense (25 percent of their total eligibility) and are withheld from competition for a full season. A second positive test for street drugs results in another lost year of eligibility and year withheld from competition. A second positive result for PED usage will render the student-athlete permanently ineligible”.
