= Providence Friars men's basketball statistical leaders =

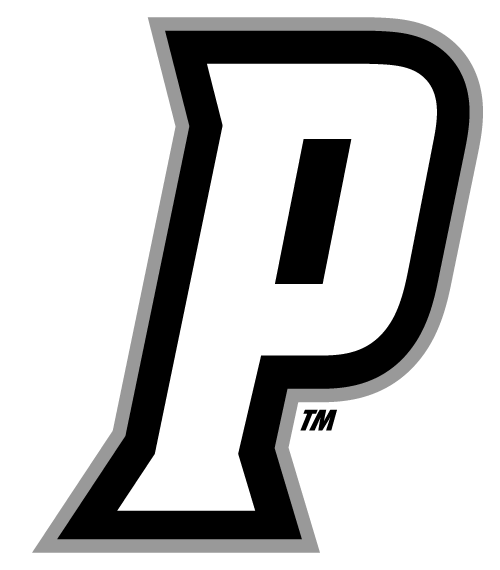

The Providence Friars men's basketball statistical leaders are individual statistical leaders of the Providence Friars men's basketball program in various categories, including points, assists, blocks, rebounds, and steals. Within those areas, the lists identify single-game, single-season, and career leaders. The Friars represent Providence College in the NCAA's Big East Conference.

Providence began competing in intercollegiate basketball in 1926. However, the school's record book does not generally list records from before the 1950s, as records from before this period are often incomplete and inconsistent. Since scoring was much lower in this era, and teams played much fewer games during a typical season, it is likely that few or no players from this era would appear on these lists anyway.

The NCAA did not officially record assists as a stat until the 1983–84 season, and blocks and steals until the 1985–86 season, but Providence's record books includes players in these stats before these seasons. These lists are updated through the end of the 2021–22 season.

== Scoring ==
Career
Rk	Player	Points	Seasons
1	Ryan Gomes	2138	2001–02 2002–03 2003–04 2004–05
2	LaDontae Henton	2059	2011–12 2012–13 2013–14 2014–15
3	Jimmy Walker	2045	1964–65 1965–66 1966–67
4	Eric Murdock	2021	1987–88 1988–89 1989–90 1990–91
5	Bryce Cotton	1975	2010–11 2011–12 2012–13 2013–14
6	Jamel Thomas	1971	1995–96 1996–97 1997–98 1998–99
7	Marvin Barnes	1839	1971–72 1972–73 1973–74
8	Joe Hassett	1828	1973–74 1974–75 1975–76 1976–77
9	Bruce Campbell	1809	1974–75 1975–76 1976–77 1977–78
10	Ernie DiGregorio	1760	1970–71 1971–72 1972–73

Season
Rk	Player	Points	Season
1	Jimmy Walker	852	1966–67
2	Eric Murdock	818	1990–91
3	MarShon Brooks	788	2010–11
4	Bryce Cotton	763	2013–14
5	Ernie DiGregorio	761	1972–73
6	Ben Bentil	738	2015–16
7	Marvin Barnes	706	1973–74
8	Billy Donovan	702	1986–87
9	John Thompson	681	1963–64
10	Ryan Gomes	670	2004–05

Single game
Rk	Player	Points	Season	Opponent
1	Marvin Barnes	52	1973–74	Austin Peay
	MarShon Brooks	52	2010–11	Notre Dame
3	Jimmy Walker	50	1965–66	Boston College
4	Eric Murdock	48	1990–91	Pittsburgh
5	Jimmy Walker	47	1966–67	Holy Cross
6	Jimmy Walker	46	1966–67	Rhode Island
7	Eric Murdock	45	1990–91	Arizona
8	Jimmy Walker	44	1966–67	Canisius
9	Jimmy Walker	43	1966–67	Santa Clara
	Jimmy Walker	43	1966–67	San Francisco
	John Thompson	43	1963–64	Fairfield
	Jim Hadnot	43	1961–62	Holy Cross
	MarShon Brooks	43	2010–11	Georgetown

== Rebounds ==
Career
Rk	Player	Rebounds	Seasons
1	Marvin Barnes	1592	1971–72 1972–73 1973–74
2	Jim Hadnot	1299	1959–60 1960–61 1961–62
3	John Thompson	1061	1961–62 1962–63 1963–64
4	Geoff McDermott	1055	2005–06 2006–07 2007–08 2008–09
5	LaDontae Henton	1054	2011–12 2012–13 2013–14 2014–15
6	Michael Smith	1038	1991–92 1992–93 1993–94
7	Ryan Gomes	1028	2001–02 2002–03 2003–04 2004–05
8	Bruce Campbell	949	1974–75 1975–76 1976–77 1977–78
9	Otis Thorpe	902	1980–81 1981–82 1982–83 1983–84
10	Alpha Diallo	833	2016–17 2017–18 2018–19 2019–20

Season
Rk	Player	Rebounds	Season
1	Marvin Barnes	597	1973–74
2	Marvin Barnes	571	1972–73
3	Jim Hadnot	475	1960–61
4	Jim Hadnot	473	1959–60
5	Marvin Barnes	424	1971–72
6	John Thompson	392	1962–63
7	John Thompson	378	1963–64
8	Michael Smith	375	1992–93
9	Jim Hadnot	351	1961–62
10	Michael Smith	344	1993–94

Single game
Rk	Player	Rebounds	Season	Opponent
1	Marvin Barnes	34	1971–72	Buffalo State
2	Marvin Barnes	30	1972–73	Assumption
3	Marvin Barnes	28	1972–73	Fairfield
4	Marvin Barnes	27	1973–74	Brown
5	Marvin Barnes	26	1973–74	Seton Hall
	Michael Smith	26	1993–94	Syracuse
7	John Ritch	25	1954–55	Rhode Island
	Jim Hadnot	25	1959–60	St. Bonaventure
	Jim Hadnot	25	1959–60	Boston College
	Jim Hadnot	25	1961–62	Holy Cross
	Marvin Barnes	25	1971–72	St. Francis
	Marvin Barnes	25	1971–72	Fairfield

== Assists ==
Career
Rk	Player	Assists	Seasons
1	Vincent Council	725	2009–10 2010–11 2011–12 2012–13
2	Ernie DiGregorio	662	1970–71 1971–72 1972–73
3	Kyron Cartwright	646	2014–15 2015–16 2016–17 2017–18
4	Kris Dunn	552	2012–13 2013–14 2014–15 2015–16
5	Billy Donovan	546	1983–84 1984–85 1985–86 1986–87
6	Carlton Screen	532	1986–87 1987–88 1988–89 1989–90
7	Ricky Tucker	520	1979–80 1980–81 1981–82 1982–83
8	Bob Misevicius	490	1974–75 1975–76 1976–77 1977–78
9	Eric Murdock	487	1987–88 1988–89 1989–90 1990–91
	Vin Ernst	487	1960–61 1961–62 1962–63

Season
Rk	Player	Assists	Season
1	Ernie DiGregorio	267	1972–73
2	Kris Dunn	247	2014–15
3	Vin Ernst	243	1962–63
	Billy Donovan	243	1986–87
5	Abdul Abdullah	241	1993–94
6	God Shammgod	239	1996–97
7	Vincent Council	231	2011–12
8	Kyron Cartwright	222	2016–17
9	Ernie DiGregorio	214	1971–72
10	Kris Dunn	206	2015–16

Single game
Rk	Player	Assists	Season	Opponent
1	Vin Ernst	16	1962–63	DePaul
	Vin Ernst	16	1962–63	Catholic
	Carlton Screen	16	1989–90	Syracuse
	Vincent Council	16	2010–11	Brown
5	Jim Larranaga	15	1969–70	VCU
	Kyron Cartwright	15	2017–18	St. John's
7	Ernie DiGregorio	14	1970–71	DePaul
	Ernie DiGregorio	14	1972–73	St. Francis
	Ernie DiGregorio	14	1971–72	Loyola
	Vincent Council	14	2011–12	Rutgers
	Vincent Council	14	2011–12	Louisville
	Kris Dunn	14	2014–15	Navy
	Kris Dunn	14	2015–16	Villanova
	Kris Dunn	14	2015–16	Hartford

== Steals ==
Career
Rk	Player	Steals	Seasons
1	John Linehan	385	1997–98 1998–99 1999–00 2000–01 2001–02
2	Eric Murdock	376	1987–88 1988–89 1989–90 1990–91
3	Carlton Screen	226	1986–87 1987–88 1988–89 1989–90
4	Kris Dunn	208	2012–13 2013–14 2014–15 2015–16
5	Harold Starks	207	1982–83 1983–84 1984–85 1985–86
6	Geoff McDermott	205	2005–06 2006–07 2007–08 2008–09
7	Ryan Gomes	181	2001–02 2002–03 2003–04 2004–05
	Corey Wright	181	1996–97 1997–98 1998–99
9	Joe Hassett	176	1973–74 1974–75 1975–76 1976–77
	Michael Brown	174	1992–93 1993–94 1994–95 1995–96

Season
Rk	Player	Steals	Season
1	John Linehan	139	2001–02
2	Eric Murdock	111	1990–91
3	Carlton Screen	101	1988–89
4	John Linehan	98	1998–99
5	Eric Murdock	97	1988–89
6	Dwight Williams	93	1977–78
7	Eric Murdock	90	1987–88
	Kris Dunn	90	2014–15
9	God Shammgod	88	1996–97
10	Harold Starks	84	1985–86

Single game
Rk	Player	Steals	Season	Opponent
1	John Linehan	11	2001–02	Rutgers
2	God Shammgod	10	1996–97	Brown
	Miles Byrd	10	2026–27	Colorado
4	John Linehan	9	1997–98	Pittsburgh
	John Linehan	9	1998–99	Georgetown
	John Linehan	9	2001–02	Boston College
7	Vin Ernst	8	1962–63	Canisius
	Eric Murdock	8	1987–88	Miami
	Kris Dunn	8	2015–16	Harvard
10	Dwight Williams	7	1977–78	St. Bonaventure
	Dwight Williams	7	1977–78	Boston College
	Dwight Williams	7	1977–78	St. Joseph's
	Harold Starks	7	1985–86	Seton Hall
	Delray Brooks	7	1986–87	Austin Peay
	Delray Brooks	7	1987–88	Marist
	Carlton Screen	7	1988–89	Boston College
	Eric Murdock	7	1990–91	Manhattan
	Eric Murdock	7	1990–91	Seton Hall (1-2-91) 7
	Eric Murdock	7	1990–91	St. John's
	John Linehan	7	1997–98	Notre Dame
	John Linehan	7	1998–99	Georgetown
	Kris Dunn	7	2015–16	NJIT
	Kris Dunn	7	2015–16	Xavier
	Miles Byrd	7	2026–27	Maine

== Blocks ==
Career
Rk	Player	Blocks	Seasons
1	Marvin Barnes	363	1971–72 1972–73 1973–74
2	Marcus Douthit	295	2000–01 2001–02 2002–03 2003–04
3	Bob Cooper	284	1973–74 1974–75 1975–76 1976–77
4	Herbert Hill	189	2003–04 2004–05 2005–06 2006–07
5	Steve Wright	184	1984–85 1985–86 1986–87 1987–88
6	Rich Hunger	166	1977–78 1978–79 1979–80 1980–81
7	Carson Desrosiers	161	2013–14 2014–15
8	Randall Hanke	155	2004–05 2005–06 2006–07 2007–08 2008–09
9	Bilal Dixon	141	2009–10 2010–11 2011–12
10	Oswin Erhunmwunse	122	2024–25 2025–26

Season
Rk	Player	Blocks	Season
1	Marvin Barnes	159	1973–74
2	Marvin Barnes	137	1972–73
3	Bob Cooper	101	1973–74
4	Marcus Douthit	97	2002–03
5	Marcus Douthit	92	2003–04
6	Herbert Hill	91	2006–07
7	Bob Cooper	87	1974–75
8	Carson Desrosiers	82	2013–14
9	Carson Desrosiers	79	2014–15
10	Oswin Erhunmwunse	70	2025–26

Single game
Rk	Player	Blocks	Season	Opponent
1	Marvin Barnes	12	1971–72	Buffalo State
2	Marvin Barnes	11	1971–72	St. Joseph's
3	Jim Hadnot	10	1959–60	St. Louis
	Marvin Barnes	10	1972–73	Brown
	Bob Cooper	10	1976–77	Michigan
	Karim Shabazz	10	1999–00	Long Island
	Karim Shabazz	10	2000–01	Rhode Island
8	Marvin Barnes	9	1972–73	Fairfield
	Marcus Douthit	9	2002–03	Connecticut
	Randall Hanke	9	2004–05	Memphis
