= Kyron Cartwright =

American professional basketball player

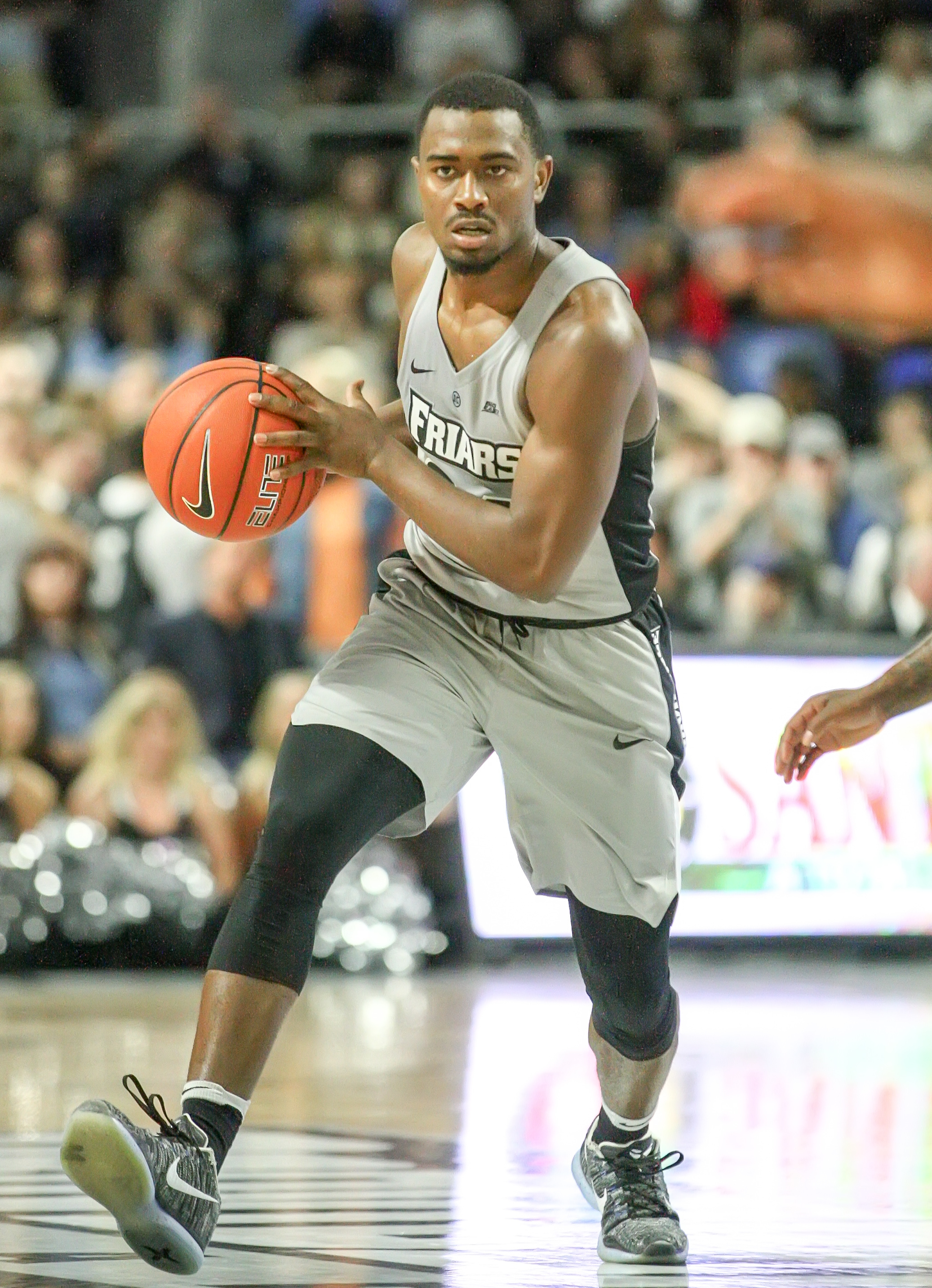

Hampton Pirates
- Position: Assistant/Player Development
- League: Coastal Athletic Association

Personal information
- Born: June 6, 1996 (age 30) Compton, California, U.S.
- Listed height: 5 ft 11 in (1.80 m)
- Listed weight: 185 lb (84 kg)

Career information
- High school: Compton (Compton, California)
- College: Providence (2014–2018)
- NBA draft: 2018: undrafted
- Playing career: 2018–2021

Career history

Playing
- 2018–2019: Alba Fehérvár
- 2019–2020: Leicester Riders
- 2020–2021: Phoenix Hagen

Coaching
- 2021–2022: Saint Thomas Academy (assistant)
- 2022: Minnesota Crookston (assistant)
- 2024–present: Hampton (assistant)

Career highlights
- Second-team All-Big East (2017); Big East Most Improved Player (2017)

Kyron Nahshon Cartwright (born June 6, 1996) is an American basketball coach and former player. He played college basketball for Providence College and professionally in Europe

== Early life and high school ==
Cartwright was born and raised in Compton, California, where his father serves as the supervisor of the Compton Parks and Recreation Department. He attended Compton High School. As a junior, he posted 12 points and seven assists and was named first team All-Moore League and All-Area by the Daily Breeze and helped lead Compton to a 25–8 record as a senior. Cartwright initially committed to Loyola Marymount, but de-committed and opted for Providence after Loyola coach Max Good was fired.

== College career ==
Cartwright played four seasons for the Providence Friars from 2014 to 2018. He served as back-up behind Kris Dunn as a freshman and became a key reserve and occasional starter as a sophomore before ultimately serving as the Friars' starting point guard during his final two seasons. In his first full season as a starter, Cartwright averaged 11.3 points, 3.5 rebounds and a conference-leading 6.8 assists per game and was named second-team All-Big East and the conference's Most Improved Player.

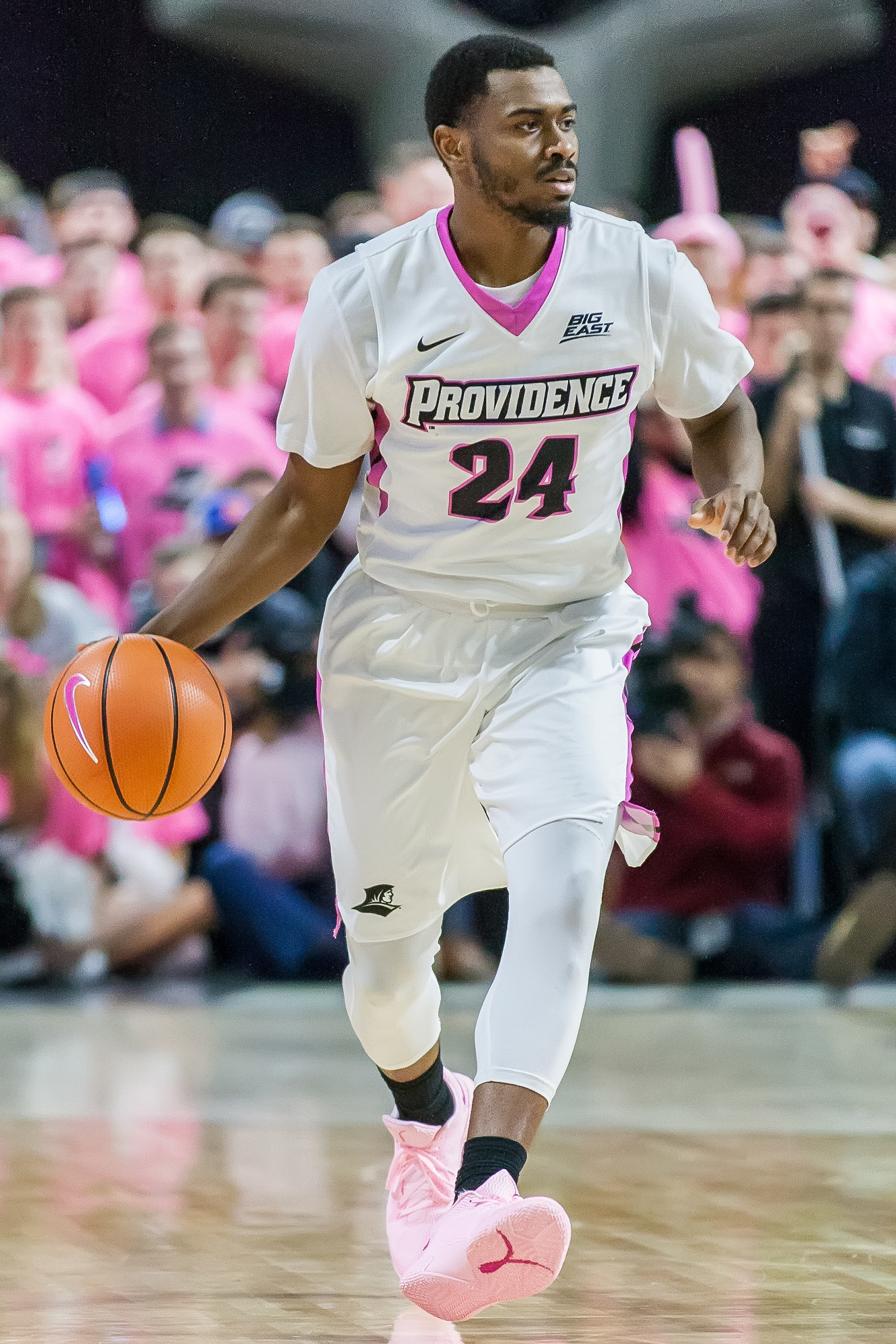
Cartwright in 2018

At the beginning of his senior season, Cartwright helped propel the Friars to win the 2017 2K Sports Classic and was named the tournament's Most Valuable Player. As a senior, he again led the Big East with 5.8 assists per game and averaged 11.4 points, 3.0 rebounds, and 1.3 steals and was named honorable mention All-Big East. Cartwright was named to the 2018 Big East men's basketball tournament All-Tournament team after averaging 15.7 points, 4.7 assists, and two rebounds per game during Providence's run to the tournament final before ultimately losing Villanova.

== Professional career ==
=== Alba Fehérvár ===
Cartwright signed with Alba Fehérvár of the Hungarian Nemzeti Bajnokság I/A (NB I/A) on July 18, 2018, joining Providence teammate Rodney Bullock. Cartwright averaged 9.1 points, 2.5 rebounds, 4.4 assists and 1.4 steals in 13 NB I/A games and 6.8 points, 2.3 rebounds, 4.4 assists and 1.1 steals in nine FIBA Europe Cup games before leaving the team in February 2019.

=== Leicester Riders ===
Cartwright signed with the Leicester Riders of the British Basketball League on July 26, 2019.

In his first season with the Riders, Cartwright was an impressive ball-handler. In an early-season game vs the Plymouth Raiders, Cartwright finished with a near all-time basketball high of 19 assists, along with 11 points and 8 rebounds. He averaged 8.6 points, 4.0 rebounds, and 9.1 assists per game.

=== Phoenix Hagen ===
On July 26, 2020, Cartwright signed with Phoenix Hagen of the ProA.

== Coaching career ==
Cartwright retired from playing in 2021 and became an assistant basketball coach at Saint Thomas Academy in Mendota Heights, Minnesota. He was hired as an assistant coach at Minnesota Crookston on August 16, 2022. Cartwright left Minnesota Crookston after being hired as a Special Assistant to head coach Ed Cooley at Providence on December 5, 2022. After Cooley left Providence to become the head coach at Georgetown, Cartwright was hired to the Hoyas support staff as a video and social media coordinator.
