= Rodney Bullock =

American basketball player

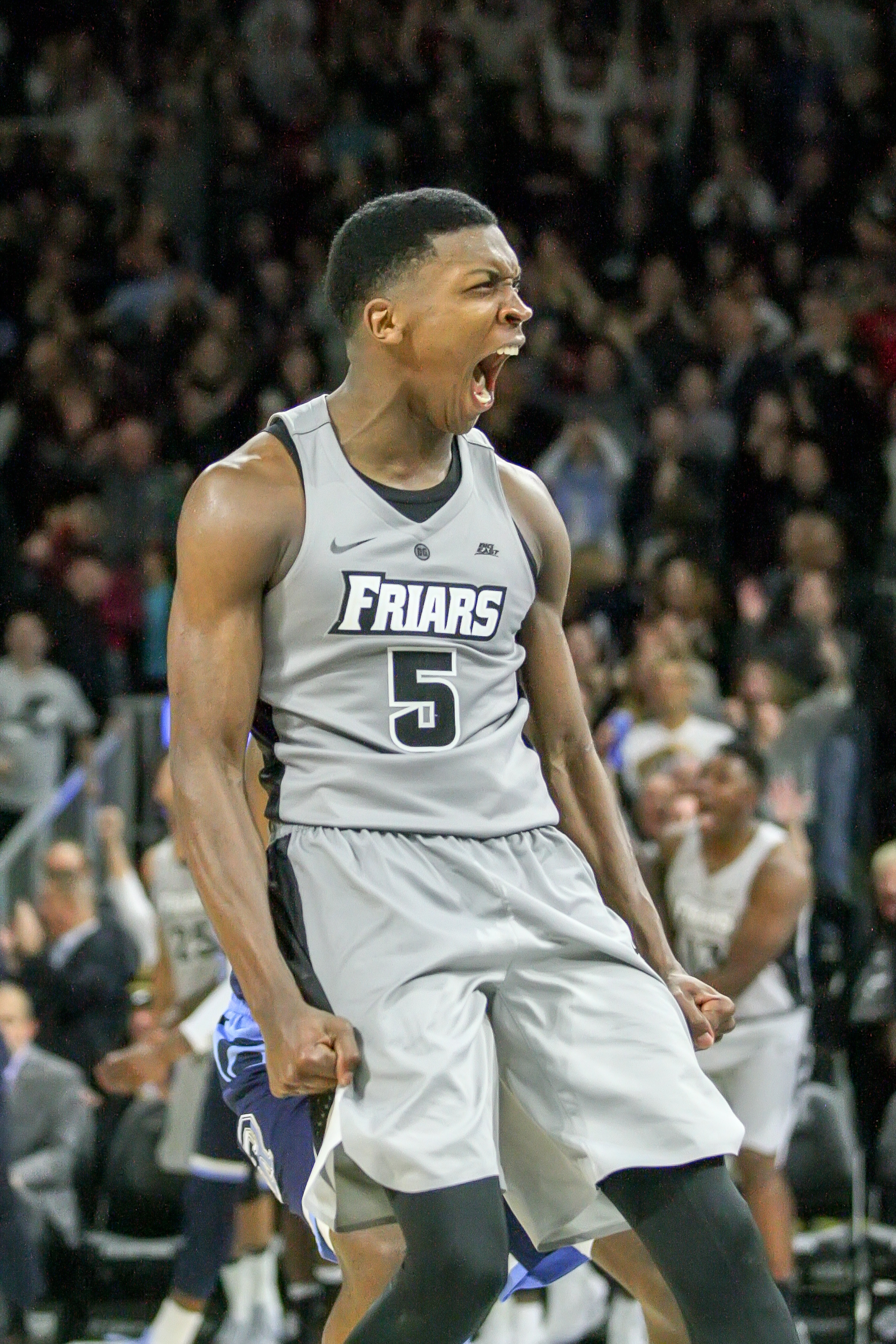

No. 5 – KB Prishtina
- Position: Small forward
- League: Kosovo Basketball Superleague

Personal information
- Born: 3 June 1994 (age 32)
- Listed height: 6 ft 8 in (2.03 m)
- Listed weight: 220 lb (100 kg)

Career information
- High school: Kecoughtan (Hampton, Virginia)
- College: Providence (2015–2018)
- NBA draft: 2018: undrafted
- Playing career: 2018–present

Career history
- 2018–2019: Alba Fehérvár
- 2019: Prishtina
- 2019–2020: Al-Ahli Jeddah

Career highlights
- Second-team All-Big East (2017)

Rodney Bullock Jr. (born 3 June 1994) is an American professional basketball player for Prishtina of the Kosovo Basketball Superleague. He competed in college basketball for Providence.

== High school career ==
Bullock attended Kecoughtan High School where he was coached by Ivan Thomas. Bullock scored 1,778 points in his high school career and was named Daily Press Player of the Year as a senior. He committed to Providence because he developed a good relationship with coach Ed Cooley, joining teammate Josh Fortune on the Friars.

== College career ==
Along with teammate Brandon Austin, Bullock was suspended for unspecified reasons before his freshman season and did not play. It was later revealed that he was accused of sexual assault. A grand jury did not indict him due to insufficient evidence. Bullock also missed his 2014–15 season due to tearing his ACL in preseason practice. “It was definitely a difficult point of my life,” he said. “I had great teammates and great support with my mentors."

In his first collegiate game on November 14, 2015, he debuted with 20 points and six rebounds. He scored on an inbounds play with 1.5 seconds remaining in the 2016 NCAA Tournament first-round game versus USC, thus giving the Friars the win. In his redshirt sophomore season, he averaged 11.4 points and 6.8 rebounds per game. Coming into his junior season, Bullock needed to shoulder more responsibility due to the loss of Kris Dunn and Ben Bentil. He responded by scoring more the 20 points in nine games and led the Friars to a 20–13 record and fourth straight NCAA Tournament appearance. Bullock scored a career-high 36 points in a 76–62 win over New Hampshire on November 30, 2016. As a junior, Bullock was named to the Second Team All-Big East and averaged 15.7 points and 6.4 rebounds per game. After the season he flirted with the 2017 NBA draft but pulled his name out before the deadline. He missed a game on January 3, 2018, versus Marquette with the flu. As a senior, Bullock averaged 14.3 points and 5.8 rebounds per game. After the season, he was invited to participate in the Portsmouth Invitational Tournament.

== Professional career ==
After going undrafted in the 2018 NBA draft, Bullock went to Hungary and signed with Alba Fehérvár. Bullock averaged 6.5 points, 3.0 rebounds and 2.5 assists per game. In February 2019, he signed with Prishtina of the Kosovar league.
