= God Shammgod =

American basketball player (born 1976)

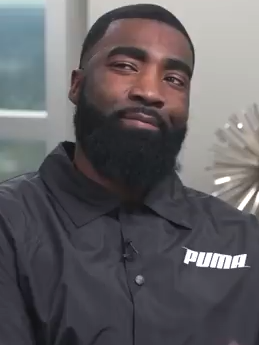
- Shammgod in 2019

New Orleans Pelicans
- Title: Assistant coach
- League: NBA

Personal information
- Born: April 29, 1976 (age 50) New York City, New York, U.S.
- Listed height: 6 ft 0 in (1.83 m)
- Listed weight: 169 lb (77 kg)

Career information
- High school: La Salle Academy (New York City, New York)
- College: Providence (1995–1997)
- NBA draft: 1997: 2nd round, 46th overall pick
- Drafted by: Washington Wizards
- Playing career: 1997–2009
- Position: Point guard
- Number: 2
- Coaching career: 2012–present

Career history

Playing
- 1997–1999: Washington Wizards
- 1999–2000: La Crosse Bobcats
- 2000–2001: Czarni Słupsk
- 2001: Florida Sea Dragons
- 2001–2002: Zhejiang Cyclones
- 2002: Al-Ittihad Jeddah
- 2002–2003: Zhejiang Cyclones
- 2003–2005: Al-Ittihad Jeddah
- 2006–2007: Shanxi Yujun
- 2007: Portland Chinooks
- 2007: Al Kuwait
- 2007–2008: Zhejiang Cyclones
- 2008: Cedevita Zagreb
- 2009: Oregon Waves

Coaching
- 2012–2015: Providence (player development)
- 2019–2025: Dallas Mavericks (player development)
- 2025–2026: Orlando Magic (assistant)
- 2026–present: New Orleans Pelicans (assistant)

Career highlights
- CBA scoring champion (2004); Third-team Parade All-American (1995); McDonald's All-American (1995)
- Stats at NBA.com
- Stats at Basketball Reference

God Shammgod (born April 29, 1976), formerly known as Shammgod Wells, is an American professional basketball coach and former player who is an assistant coach for the New Orleans Pelicans of the National Basketball Association (NBA). He played in the NBA with the Washington Wizards during 1997–98 after being drafted by them in the second round (46th overall pick) of the 1997 NBA draft. He played in the Chinese Basketball Association for several teams, including the Zhejiang Cyclones and Shanxi Yujun. He also played professionally in Poland and Saudi Arabia. Despite a brief NBA career, he is well-remembered as the progenitor and namesake of a widely used crossover dribble, the "Shammgod", although the move, known in Europe as "The Whip", was already used earlier by former Yugoslavian players Dragan Kićanović and Danko Cvjetićanin and later popularized by Dejan Bodiroga.

== Playing career ==
=== High school ===
While known as Shammgod Wells, he played high school basketball at La Salle Academy in Manhattan. His teammates at La Salle Academy included future NBA player Metta Sandiford-Artest (then known as Ron Artest) and former Providence College center Karim Shabazz. He was selected to the 1995 McDonald's All-American Team and recorded nine points in the All-American game. He also played with Kobe Bryant during a summer on an AAU team.

=== College ===
Shammgod played for two seasons at Providence College, where he averaged 10.3 PPG for his college career. He was selected to the Big East All-Rookie Team as a freshman in 1996 after setting the Big East freshman assist record, which has since been broken. As a sophomore, Shammgod teamed with future NBA player Austin Croshere in leading the Friars to the 1997 Elite Eight, where they lost to eventual NCAA champion Arizona in overtime. Shammgod registered 23 points and five assists while matching up against future NBA player Mike Bibby in the loss.

=== Professional career ===
Shammgod appeared in 20 games for the Washington Wizards in 1997–98. Shammgod later played in the Chinese Basketball Association. Most of his professional playing career was spent outside of the United States.

== Coaching career ==
Shammgod reenrolled at Providence in 2012 to complete his undergraduate studies and earned a Bachelor's degree in Leadership Development in May 2015. He served as an undergraduate student assistant on Ed Cooley's staff and has been credited with playing a role in the development of Bryce Cotton and Kris Dunn.

From 2019 through 2025, Shammgod was an assistant coach for the Dallas Mavericks under Rick Carlisle and Jason Kidd, primarily working with players on ball handling skills.

On July 3, 2025, it was announced that Shammgod would join the Orlando Magic as an assistant coach under Jamahl Mosley. On May 24, 2026, it was announced that Shammgod would join the New Orleans Pelicans as an assistant coach, reuniting with Mosley.

== Name ==
Shammgod's birth name is God Shammgod. Often teased for his unusual name during childhood, he went by Shammgod Wells (using his mother's maiden name) throughout high school. When he enrolled at Providence, he was informed he would have to register under his legal name. Because it would have cost $600 to change his legal name to Shammgod Wells, Shammgod stopped using the alias.

== Career statistics ==
Legend
GP	Games played	GS	Games started	MPG	Minutes per game
FG%	Field goal percentage	3P%	3-point field goal percentage	FT%	Free throw percentage
RPG	Rebounds per game	APG	Assists per game	SPG	Steals per game
BPG	Blocks per game	PPG	Points per game	**Bold**	Career high

=== NBA ===
Year	Team	GP	GS	MPG	FG%	3P%	FT%	RPG	APG	SPG	BPG	PPG
1997–98	Washington	20	0	7.3	.328	.000	.767	.4	1.8	.4	.1	3.1
Career		20	0	7.3	.328	.000	.767	.4	1.8	.4	.1	3.1
