= Darrun Hilliard =

American basketball player (born 1993)

- Hilliard with Bilbao in 2026

No. 11 – Bilbao Basket
- Position: Shooting guard / small forward
- League: Liga ACB

Personal information
- Born: April 13, 1993 (age 33) Bethlehem, Pennsylvania, U.S.
- Listed height: 6 ft 6 in (1.98 m)
- Listed weight: 220 lb (100 kg)

Career information
- High school: Liberty (Bethlehem, Pennsylvania)
- College: Villanova (2011–2015)
- NBA draft: 2015: 2nd round, 38th overall pick
- Drafted by: Detroit Pistons
- Playing career: 2015–present

Career history
- 2015–2017: Detroit Pistons
- 2015; 2017: →Grand Rapids Drive
- 2017–2018: San Antonio Spurs
- 2017–2018: →Austin Spurs
- 2018–2019: Saski Baskonia
- 2019–2021: CSKA Moscow
- 2021–2022: Bayern Munich
- 2022–2023: Maccabi Tel Aviv
- 2023–2024: Pınar Karşıyaka
- 2024–2025: CB Breogán
- 2025: UNICS Kazan
- 2025–present: Bilbao Basket

Career highlights
- FIBA Europe Cup champion (2026); FIBA Europe Cup Final MVP (2026); Israeli League champion (2023); NBA G League champion (2018); VTB United League champion (2021); Israeli League Cup winner (2022); Gomelsky Cup winner (2020); Second-team All-American – SN (2015); First-team All-Big East (2015); Big East Co-Most Improved Player (2014); Robert V. Geasey Trophy (2015)
- Stats at NBA.com
- Stats at Basketball Reference
Medals
Men's basketball
Representing United States
FIBA AmeriCup
Gold medal – first place	2017 Argentina

Darrun Cordell Hilliard II (born April 13, 1993) is an American professional basketball player for Bilbao Basket of the Liga ACB. He played college basketball for the Villanova Wildcats. He was drafted in the second round of the 2015 NBA draft by the Detroit Pistons, and appeared in 77 games for the team. He also had a brief stint with the San Antonio Spurs in the National Basketball Association (NBA).

Hilliard attended Liberty High School in Bethlehem, Pennsylvania, where he was a two-time Associated Press first-team selection. As a high school senior, he averaged 19.7 points per game. Hilliard then committed to play to Villanova and coach Jay Wright. He showed steady improvement every year, going from 4.8 points per game as a freshman to 14.3 points per game as a senior as he helped Villanova reach the NCAA Tournament in three straight seasons. As a senior, he was named to the first-team All-Big East and was honored as Big 5 Player of the Year.

== Early life ==
Hilliard was born on April 13, 1993, to Charlene Jenkins and Darrun Hilliard. His mother is a representative for an insurance company. His father played basketball at the high school level and first introduced his son to the sport when he was five years old. Growing up, Hilliard also played football, but preferred basketball. His favorite NBA player was Allen Iverson. He used to bike to Philadelphia Eagles practices as a kid.

== High school career ==
Hilliard attended Liberty High School in Bethlehem, Pennsylvania, where he was a two-time Associated Press first-team selection. Despite eating, writing, and throwing a football right handed, Hilliard shoots left-handed. As a freshman, he measured 6 feet 1 inch (1.85 m). His parents split up after his freshman year, and he developed a unique bond with Liberty assistant coach Mike Bachman. As a junior, he averaged 18 points and six rebounds per game and shot 52 percent from the field. Hilliard led the Hurricanes to PIAA state semifinals, where Liberty lost to Penn Wood. In the loss to Penn Wood, Hilliard had 26 points. He was named The Morning Call player of the year as a junior. In addition, he was selected to the First Team Class AAAA.

Hilliard averaged 19.7 points per game as a senior. He was named The Express-Times player of the year after leading the Hurricanes to the second round of the PIAA playoffs. Hilliard scored 1,413 points in his high school career, finishing second in Liberty High School history. He committed to Villanova in November 2010. When Hilliard informed his mother he was receiving a full scholarship to Villanova, she did not understand and was trying to figure how much she would have to pay for her son's education.

== College career ==
=== Freshman ===
Villanova coach Jay Wright considered redshirting Hilliard in his freshman season, but Wright decided against it after a rash of injuries to his players. He had 13 points in back-to-back games against Penn and Missouri in December 2011. As a freshman, Hilliard averaged 4.8 points, 2.5 rebounds and 18.1 minutes per game in 29 games and shot 29.2 percent from behind the three-point arc. During the season, he reached out to his family and friends to see if he made the right decision to come to Villanova. He said, "Freshman year was probably my toughest year of basketball", due to difficulties in adjusting to a new coach and teammates. He described himself as a mentally unstable 17-year-old.

=== Sophomore ===
In his sophomore season (2012–13), he averaged 11.4 points in just under 30 minutes a game. This proved to be his breakout season and he would go on to start all 34 games that year. He helped Villanova defeat a few top-five teams that season. In a comeback win over #5 Louisville on January 22, he made a three-point play after making a steal at halfcourt which helped spark the rally. In a 75–71 overtime victory over #3 Syracuse on January 26, 2013, he had 25 points and six assists in 38 minutes. As a result of his play against Syracuse, Hilliard was honored as Big East Player of the Week and Oscar Robertson National Player of the Week. He also helped them beat then #5 Georgetown on March 6 by the score of 67–57. In that game, he had 14 points and three steals.

Villanova enjoyed a 20–14 season after a down year and reached the NCAA tournament where they were seeded ninth and matched up with eight seed North Carolina in the first round. Hilliard had a strong showing in a 78–71 loss to North Carolina, scoring 18 points.

=== Junior ===
Hilliard improved in most offensive categories in the 2013–14 season, his junior year. He averaged 14.3 points per game that season and improved his three-point shooting percentage to 41.4 percent (up from 31.5 percent the year before). He made 70 three-pointers that year out of 169 attempts. Hilliard scored 20 points on 8-of-13 shooting against Marquette in a 94–85 victory on January 25, 2014. In an 82–79 win over Providence, he hit a crucial 3-pointer with a minute left in overtime. In a 73–56 win over Marquette on March 2 at the Wells Fargo Center, he established a new career high with 26 points on 7-of-11 shooting from the field.

Villanova compiled a 29–5 record and won the Big East regular season championship and Battle for Atlantis title despite not being ranked in the preseason. In the 2014 NCAA tournament, Hilliard scored 16 points to help Villanova get past Milwaukee. Villanova lost to eventual national champion Connecticut in the Round of 32, with Hilliard adding 13 points in the 77–65 loss. He was an honorable mention all-Big East selection at the conclusion of the regular season. He shared Big East Most Improved Player award with teammate Daniel Ochefu. Hilliard joined teammate Ryan Arcidiacono on the All-Big 5 Second Team.

=== Senior ===
He is the leader of our team, on and off the court. Defensively he can guard small forwards, guards. He always hits big shots for us. Teams are leaning to him a lot more and he's creating shots for his teammates. The way he's handled everything unselfishly and done everything for the team, he's put winning first ahead of individual accomplishments. I'm thrilled that he's a candidate for player of the year and I'd love for him to get it.

— Jay Wright

Coming into the 2014–15 season, Hilliard was named to the Preseason Second Team All-Big East. He averaged 14.3 points, 3.6 rebounds, and 2.1 assists per game as a senior. Villanova was ranked in the top ten for most of the season thanks to a balanced offense. Hilliard scored 23 points on December 20 in an overtime victory over Syracuse, hitting 9-of-17 shots. He hit two free throws to give the Wildcats the first lead of the game in overtime before being kicked in the face and tested for concussion-like symptoms. Against Creighton on January 25, 2015, he scored 24 points and made 6-of-10 three-pointers in a 71–50 victory at home. On February 14, in a 78–75 victory over Butler, Hilliard scored a career-high 31 points and also set a career high with 8 three-pointers made out of 13 attempts. He also hit the game-winning three-pointer with 1.5 seconds to play in the game. Eight of his nine field goals in that game were three-pointers, and his eight rebounds were one short of a career-high. He averaged 18.7 points during a nine-game stretch that included the Butler game.

Hilliard led the Wildcats to a 33–3 season. His final game at Villanova was a 71–68 upset at the hands of N.C. State in the NCAA Tournament Round of 32, despite contributing 27 points. Hilliard finished his Villanova career with 1,511 points, 18th highest in school history; 400 rebounds; and 176 steals. Hilliard was a 2014–15 Men's All-District II Team selection by the U.S. Basketball Writers Association. The Sporting News selected him to be a Second Team All-American. Hilliard was one of three players, along with LaDontae Henton and Kris Dunn, to be unanimously named to the All Big East First Team. He was named to the First Team All-District V by the National Association of Basketball Coaches, and was named Big 5 Player of the Year. After the season, he was invited to the Portsmouth Invitational Tournament.

== Professional career ==
=== Detroit Pistons (2015–2017) ===
Prior to the 2015 NBA draft, Hilliard signed with James Dunleavy as his agent. He was listed in the 55–70 range among NBA draft prospects by several media agencies. On June 25, 2015, Hilliard was selected 38th overall by the Detroit Pistons in the second round of the draft. Hilliard attributed the decision to a productive workout with the team. After averaging 9.4 points per game in Orlando Summer League play, on July 20, Hilliard signed a three-year deal with the Pistons, with one year being guaranteed. Coach Stan Van Gundy praised Hilliard's shooting prowess, despite a poor showing in the Summer League.

He broke his nose during training camp after engaging in a pickup game. The injury required surgery and he needed to wear a mask. On November 23, he made his NBA debut in a 109–88 loss against the Milwaukee Bucks, recording two points and three rebounds in 12 minutes. During his rookie season, he received multiple assignments to the Grand Rapids Drive, the Pistons' D-League affiliate.

On June 30, 2016, Hilliard was ruled out of the 2016 NBA Summer League after he suffered a stress fracture of the lower back. During the 2016–17 season, Hilliard had multiple assignments with the Grand Rapids Drive.

On June 28, 2017, Hilliard was traded to the Houston Rockets for cash considerations, then immediately got traded to the Los Angeles Clippers as part of the trade that sent Chris Paul to Houston. A day later, he was waived by the Clippers.

=== San Antonio Spurs (2017–2018) ===
On September 11, 2017, Hilliard signed a two-way contract with the San Antonio Spurs, meaning he would be available to split playing time between San Antonio and their NBA G League affiliate, the Austin Spurs. On February 23, 2018, in his first game in the G League in a month, Hilliard contributed 31 points, five assists, one rebound and one steal in a 134–123 loss to the Texas Legends. He had 22 points, four rebounds, three assists, one steal and one block in a win against the Reno Bighorns on March 10. He posted 21.2 points per game for Austin.

=== Kirolbet Baskonia (2018–2019) ===
On August 13, 2018, Hilliard signed a one-year deal with Kirolbet Baskonia of the Liga ACB and the EuroLeague. He averaged 9.4 points, 2.9 rebounds and 1.1 assists per game.

=== CSKA Moscow (2019–2021) ===
On July 3, 2019, Hilliard signed a one-year deal with the Russian team CSKA Moscow of the VTB United League and the EuroLeague. He scored 14 points in a win against his former team Baskonia on January 17, 2020. On June 25, 2020, Hilliard extended the contract for one year. He scored a career-high 31 points on November 11, in a win against Baskonia. During the 2020–21 season, he averaged 8.7 points, 2.2 rebounds, and 1.1 assists per game. On June 18, 2021, Hilliard parted ways with the Russian powerhouse.

=== Bayern Munich (2021–2022) ===
On July 16, 2021, Hilliard signed with FC Bayern Munich of the Basketball Bundesliga. During the 2021–22 season, he averaged 12.7 points, 2.6 rebounds, and 2.1 assists per game.

=== Maccabi Tel Aviv (2022–2023) ===
On June 26, 2022, Hilliard signed a one-year deal with Maccabi Tel Aviv of the Israeli Premier League and the EuroLeague.

=== Pınar Karşıyaka (2023–2024) ===
On September 1, 2023, he signed with Pınar Karşıyaka of the Basketbol Süper Ligi (BSL).

=== Bilbao Basket (2025–present) ===
On June 20, 2025, he signed with Bilbao Basket of the Liga ACB.

== National team career ==
Hilliard played with the senior United States national team at the 2017 FIBA AmeriCup, where he won a gold medal. He was named to the All-Tournament Team.

== Career statistics ==
Legend
GP	Games played	GS	Games started	MPG	Minutes per game
FG%	Field-goal percentage	3P%	3-point field-goal percentage	FT%	Free-throw percentage
RPG	Rebounds per game	APG	Assists per game	SPG	Steals per game
BPG	Blocks per game	PPG	Points per game	PIR	Performance index rating
**Bold**	Career high

=== EuroLeague ===
Year	Team	GP	GS	MPG	FG%	3P%	FT%	RPG	APG	SPG	BPG	PPG	PIR
2018–19	Baskonia	**34**	11	**20.5**	.412	.322	.775	**2.9**	1.1	**.7**	.1	9.4	6.9
2019–20	CSKA Moscow	27	**12**	20.1	.404	**.412**	.796	2.4	**1.2**	.6	.1	**10.6**	**7.1**
2020–21	CSKA Moscow	**37**	**30**	19.2	**.441**	.327	**.857**	2.0	1.1	.6	**.2**	8.7	5.9
Career		30	11	20.4	.408	.367	.785	2.6	1.1	.6	.1	10	7

=== NBA ===
==== Regular season ====
Year	Team	GP	GS	MPG	FG%	3P%	FT%	RPG	APG	SPG	BPG	PPG
2015–16	Detroit	38	**2**	**10.1**	**.397**	**.380**	.725	**1.2**	.7	.2	.0	**4.0**
2016–17	Detroit	**39**	1	9.8	.373	.261	.750	.8	**.8**	**.3**	**.1**	3.3
2017–18	San Antonio	14	0	6.8	.263	.000	**.857**	.5	**.8**	.1	.0	1.1
Career		91	3	9.4	.377	.304	.747	.9	.8	.2	.0	3.2
