= Big East Conference Men's Basketball Most Improved Player =

- Awarded for: the most improved basketball player in the Big East Conference
- Country: United States

History
- First award: 1997
- Most recent: Tyler Perkins, Villanova

The Big East Conference Men's Basketball Most Improved Player award is given to the men's basketball player in the Big East Conference voted as the most improved by the conference coaches. It was first awarded at the end of the 1996–97 season.

== Key ==
†	Co-Most Improved Players
Player (X)	Denotes the number of times the player has been awarded the Big East Most Improved Player award at that point

== Winners ==
Season	Player	School	Position	Class	Reference
1996–97	Cheikh Yaya Dia	Georgetown	C	Senior	
1997–98	Etan Thomas	Syracuse	F/C	Sophomore	
1998–99	Johnny Hemsley	Miami	G/F	Junior	
1999–00^{†}	Ricardo Greer	Pittsburgh	F	Junior	
1999–00^{†}	Shaheen Holloway	Seton Hall	PG	Senior	
2000–01^{†}	Preston Shumpert	Syracuse	F	Junior	
2000–01^{†}	Calvin Bowman	West Virginia	C	Senior	
2001–02	Brandin Knight	Pittsburgh	PG	Junior	
2002–03	Hakim Warrick	Syracuse	F	Sophomore	
2003–04	Carl Krauser	Pittsburgh	PG	Sophomore	
2004–05^{†}	Jared Dudley	Boston College	F	Sophomore	
2004–05^{†}	Marcus Williams	UConn	PG	Sophomore	
2005–06	Aaron Gray	Pittsburgh	C	Junior	
2006–07	Herbert Hill	Providence	F/C	Senior	
2007–08	Sam Young	Pittsburgh	SF	Junior	
2008–09	Dante Cunningham	Villanova	F	Senior	
2009–10	Ashton Gibbs	Pittsburgh	PG	Sophomore	
2010–11	Dwight Hardy	St. John's	SG	Senior	
2011–12	Jack Cooley	Notre Dame	C	Junior	
2012–13^{†}	Michael Carter-Williams	Syracuse	PG	Sophomore	
2012–13^{†}	Kadeem Batts	Providence	PF	Junior	
2013–14^{†}	Daniel Ochefu	Villanova	F/C	Sophomore	
2013–14^{†}	Darrun Hilliard	Villanova	G	Junior	
2014–15	Sir'Dominic Pointer	St. John's	SG	Senior	
2015–16	Ben Bentil	Providence	F	Sophomore	
2016–17	Kyron Cartwright	Providence	PG	Junior	
2017–18	Myles Powell	Seton Hall	G	Sophomore	
2018–19	Paul Reed	DePaul	PF	Sophomore	
2019–20	Romaro Gill	Seton Hall	C	Senior	
2020–21^{†}	Julian Champagnie	St. John's	G/F	Sophomore	
2020–21^{†}	Zach Freemantle	Xavier	F	Sophomore	
2021–22	Justin Lewis	Marquette	F	Sophomore	
2022–23	Joel Soriano	St. John's	C	Senior	
2023–24	Desmond Claude	Xavier	G	Sophomore	
2024–25	Zuby Ejiofor	St. John's	F	Junior	
2025–26	Tyler Perkins	Villanova	G	Junior	
