= Providence Friars men's basketball =

Basketball team that represents Providence College

Providence College Friars men's basketball
| 2026–27 Providence Friars men's basketball team |
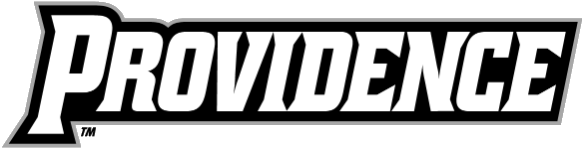
- College: Providence College
- First season: 1926–27; 100 years ago
- Athletic director: Steven Napolillo
- Head coach: Bryan Hodgson (1st season)
- Location: Providence, Rhode Island
- Arena: Amica Mutual Pavilion (capacity: 12,410)
- NCAA division: Division I
- Conference: Big East
- Nickname: Friars
- Student section: Friar Fanatics
- All-time record: 1362–880 (.607)
- NCAA tournament record: 17–23 (.425)

NCAA Division I tournament Final Four
- 1973, 1987
Other NCAA Division I tournament results
| Elite Eight | 1965, 1973, 1987, 1997 |
| Sweet Sixteen | 1965, 1973, 1974, 1987, 1997, 2022 |
| Appearances | 1964, 1965, 1966, 1972, 1973, 1974, 1977, 1978, 1987, 1989, 1990, 1994, 1997, 2001, 2004, 2014, 2015, 2016, 2017, 2018, 2022, 2023 |

NIT champions
- 1961, 1963

Conference tournament champions
- Big East: 1994, 2014

Conference regular-season champions
- Big East: 2022

Uniforms
| Home | Away | Alternate |

The Providence College Friars men's basketball team represents Providence College in NCAA Division I competition. They were a founding member of the original Big East Conference from 1979 until 2013, and are now a member of the current Big East Conference. They play their home games at the Amica Mutual Pavilion in Providence, Rhode Island.

The Friars have made two Final Four appearances in the NCAA Division I men's basketball tournament, in 1973 and 1987. Four former players or coaches – Dave Gavitt, John Thompson, Rick Pitino, and Lenny Wilkens – are enshrined in the Naismith Memorial Basketball Hall of Fame. In addition, two-time NCAA Division I men's basketball tournament champion, former Chicago Bulls head coach Billy Donovan, helped lead the Friars (as a player) to the Final Four in 1987.

== History ==
=== Early years: 1921–1955 ===
Providence Friars basketball can be traced back to 1921, when the four-year-old school fielded its first basketball team on an informal basis. This first team only lasted two years, however, and did not return until the 1926–27 season when Archie Golembeski, the school's football coach, led to the team to a win over St. John's before devoting his time to football the next year. He was replaced by Al McClellan, who coached the team to four New England championships — 1929, 1930, 1932, and 1935 — and had an overall winning percentage over .700. In 1938, McClellan left and was replaced by Ed Crotty, who led the team to a 15–5 record in 1942–43 before the team suspended play the next year after the outbreak of World War II. After the war, the NCAA divided its teams into two divisions, the University Division and the College Division; with a smaller enrollment and no home court (the team played in an on-campus auditorium and then local high school gyms), the Friars were placed into the College Division and no longer faced the opponents they once played.

=== Mullaney era: 1955–1969 ===
In 1949, Vin Cuddy was hired as the team's head coach, leading the team to a 14–9 record in his first season and qualified for the NAIB regional tournament in 1951, behind the school's first 1,000-point scorer, Jim Schlimm. By 1955, Cuddy's record fell to 9–12 and he was replaced by Joe Mullaney; at the same time, the school opened its first on-campus gym, Alumni Hall. In 1959, Mullaney and the Friars defeated ranked Villanova on the road, leading to their first-ever National Invitational Tournament bid.

The Friars reached the NIT Finals in 1960 with future hall-of-famer Lenny Wilkens being named MVP in his senior season before winning the tournament in 1961 behind Vin Ernst, John Egan, and Jim Hadnot. Two years later (1963), led by another future hall of famer, John Thompson, as well as future Boston Mayor Ray Flynn, the Friars won their second NIT title. With a 24–2 record in 1964–65, the number four ranked Friars reached the Elite Eight of the NCAA Division I men's basketball tournament. In 1966–67, Jimmy Walker led the nation in scoring and became the school's first 2,000-point scorer as well as the first New England player selected first overall in the NBA draft. That season also marked the last in Mullaney's run of nine consecutive 20-win seasons. Two years later, Mullaney was hired as the head coach of the Los Angeles Lakers of the NBA.

=== Gavitt era: 1969–1979 ===
Following Mullaney's departure, Dave Gavitt, an assistant under Mullaney who then became head coach at Dartmouth, took over as the Friars' head coach in 1969. In his second year, Gavitt began a string of eight consecutive 20-win seasons. For the 1972–73 season, the team began playing in downtown Providence at the brand-new 12,000-seat arena, the Providence Civic Center (renamed the Dunkin' Donuts Center in 2001). That season was the Friars' best to date; led by Ernie DiGregorio and the troubled center Marvin Barnes, the team went on a 17-team game winning streak that ended in a Final Four loss to Memphis State. The next year, the Friars posted a 28–4 record and made their second straight Sweet Sixteen appearance. The team continued its top-flight status with back-to-back 20-win seasons in 1976–77 and 1977–78, earning NCAA tournament bids each year, one coming after defeating top-ranked Michigan in 1976. After a 10–16 season in 1978–79, Gavitt left Providence to become the first commissioner of the Providence-based Big East Conference. He finished his 10-year career at Providence with a 209–84 (.713) record.

=== Mullaney returns: 1979–1985 ===
After spending the first six decades of their existence as an independent, the Friars joined the Big East in its inaugural season, 1979–80. The conference originally consisted of Providence, Boston College, Georgetown, St. John's, Seton Hall, Syracuse, and Connecticut. New head coach Gary Walters led the team to an 11–16 record in 1979–80, and was replaced by Mullaney in 1981. His next stint with the Friars would not be as successful, and consisted of only one winning season (1983–84, behind Otis Thorpe) against three losing.

=== Pitino era: 1985–1987 ===
In 1985, New York Knicks assistant coach Rick Pitino was hired as the latest Friars head coach. In his first season the Friars compiled a 17–14 record and made their first NIT appearance in a decade. The next year, 1986–87, the Friars posted a 25–9 record behind Billy Donovan and made their second-ever Final Four appearance in the 1987 NCAA Division I men's basketball tournament. After losing to Syracuse, Pitino left the school and re-joined the Knicks as their head coach in 1987. The Friars have not returned to the Final Four since Pitino's departure.

=== Chiesa, Barnes, Gillen: 1987–1998 ===
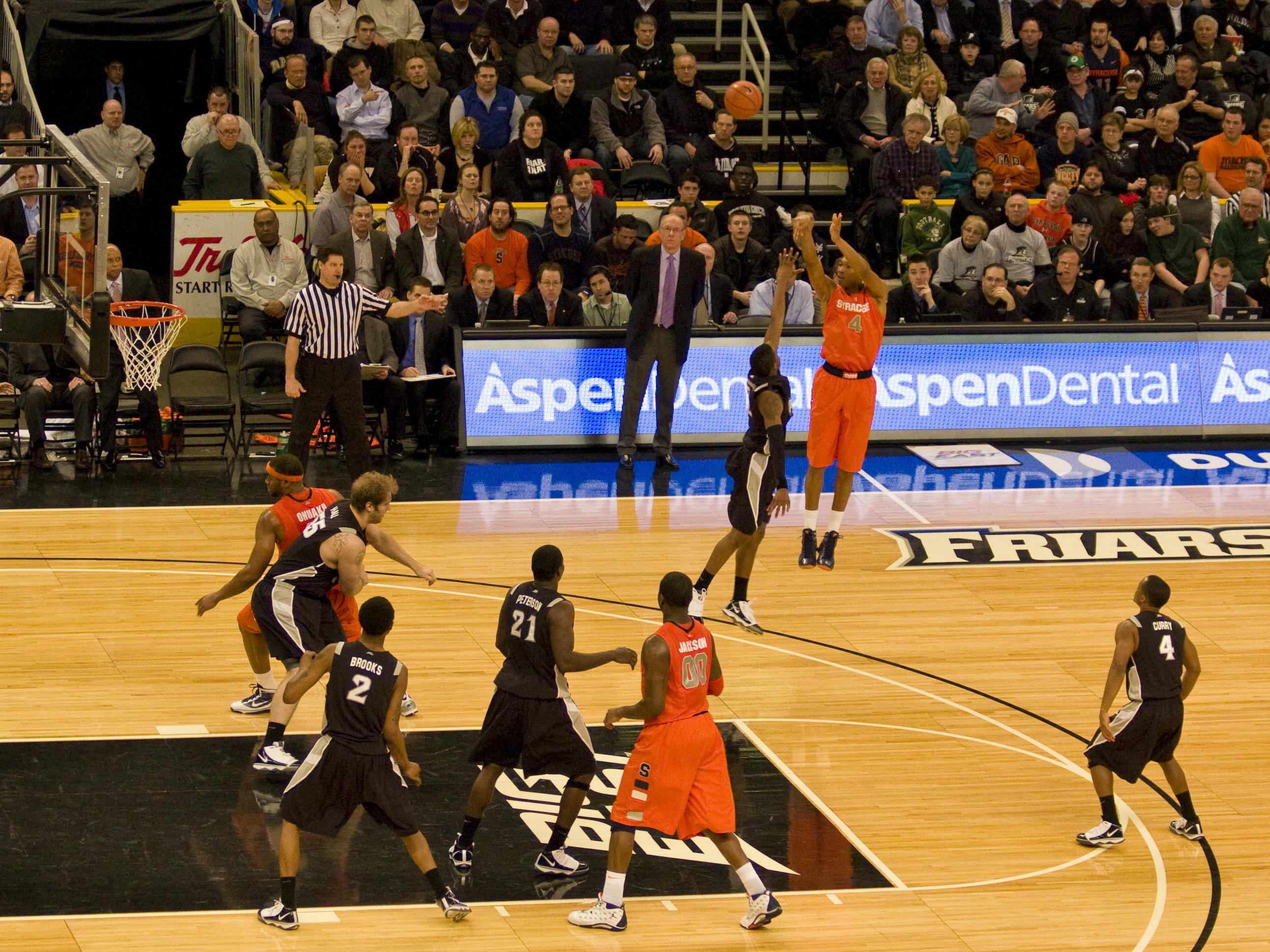
Syracuse vs. Providence game in February 2010 at the Dunkin' Donuts Center.

In 1987–88, the Friars posted a losing record under new head coach Gordie Chiesa, who was replaced by Rick Barnes after the season. Behind Barnes and 2,000-point scorer Eric Murdock, the Friars made back-to-back NCAA tournament appearances in 1989 and 1990, as well as an NIT bid in 1991. Following Murdock's departure and a losing season in 1991–92, the team had an NIT semifinal appearance in 1993 and an NCAA tournament appearance in 1994, while also capturing the school's first Big East Tournament title. Following back-to-back 20-win seasons, Barnes left to become the head coach at Clemson in 1994. He was replaced by Pete Gillen. Led by Eric Williams, the Friars made consecutive NIT appearances in 1995 and 1996. In 1996–97, the Friars posted a 24–12 record, led by Austin Croshere and Jamel Thomas. After defeating Duke in the 1997 NCAA Division I men's basketball tournament, the Friars reached the Elite Eight before losing, in overtime, to eventual champion Arizona. Following a losing season in 1997–98, Gillen departed to become the head coach at Virginia.

=== Welsh era: 1998–2008 ===
Gillen was replaced by Iona head coach Tim Welsh in 1998. Led by Thomas, the Friars made an NIT bid in 1999. The team returned to the NCAA tournament two years later, posting a 21–10 record behind John Linehan. While the Friars posted a losing record in Linehan's senior season in 2001–02, the guard broke Allen Iverson's single-season Big East steals record of 67 as well as Murdock's NCAA career steals record of 377. Led by Ryan Gomes, the Friars returned to the NIT with an 18–14 record in 2002–03 and made another NCAA appearance in 2003–04 with a 20–9 record. However, Welsh's next four teams, without Gomes after 2004–05, recorded one winning season, and Welsh was fired following the 2007–08 season.

=== Davis era: 2008–2011 ===
In 2008, the Friars hired Drake head coach Keno Davis, who won the National Coach of the Year Award in his first and only season as Drake's head coach. Davis' team posted a 19–14 record, including a win at home over top-ranked Pittsburgh, in 2008–09 en route to an NIT appearance. In 2009–10, Davis' team lost their final 11 games to finish 15th in the Big East. The Friars averaged 82 points per game, the fourth highest in Division I, while also surrendering 85 points per conference game, the worst statistical performance in Big East history. In Davis' third season, 2010–11, the Friars finished 14th in the conference despite having Division I's second-leading scorer in Marshon Brooks. Davis was fired after the 2010–11 season.

=== Cooley era: 2011–2023 ===
On March 22, 2011, the Friars hired Fairfield head coach Ed Cooley, as the 15th head coach in program history. A Providence native, Cooley brought a reinvigorated energy surrounding the program and recruited six consensus Top 100 recruits in his first three years.

==== 2011–12 season ====
In his first season at Providence, Cooley led the Friars to a 15–17 mark overall, posting an 11–3 mark (8–0 at home) in non-conference action and going 4–14 in the Big East. That season, point guard Vincent Council was named All-Big East Third Team and forward LaDontae Henton earned Big East All-Rookie Team accolades.

==== 2012–13 season — NIT quarterfinals ====
In his second season, Cooley led the Friars to a 19–15 record overall and a 9–9 mark in league play. Included in the 9–9 Big East record in 2012–13 was a 7–2 mark over the last nine games of the conference season, marking the second best turnaround over second half of the season in Big East history. The Friars played the season with a short roster with transfers Carson Desrosier and Tyler Harris having to sit out the year per NCAA transfer rules, five-star freshman shooting guard and Providence native Ricky Ledo sitting our per NCAA eligibility issues, and five-star freshman point guard Kris Dunn sitting out the first semester with a shoulder injury. Friars freshman guard Josh Fortune was the only incoming player in 2012–2013 season eligible to compete. Cooley guided the Friars to the NIT, where the squad posted a 2–1 record, beating Charlotte and Robert Morris before losing in the quarterfinals to eventual NIT Champion Baylor. That season, combo guard Bryce Cotton was named All-Big East First Team and Kadeem Batts was recognized as a co-winner of the league's Most Improved Award and earned All-Big East Honorable Mention accolades. After spending one year at Providence without being able to play, Ledo declared for the 2013 NBA Draft and was drafted by the Minnesota Timberwolves, eventually being traded to the Dallas Mavericks.

==== 2013–14 season — Big East tournament champions / NCAA tournament first round ====
In his third season at Providence, Cooley led the Friars to a 10–8 mark in the Big East Conference and finished tied for 3rd with Xavier and St. John's. Transfers, Junior forward Carson Desrosiers and Sophomore forward Tyler Harris, were eligible to play their first season in black and white, having sat out the NCAA-enforced one-year period. However, in addition to former senior point guard Vincent Council's graduation and Ricky Ledo entering the draft, sophomore point guard Kris Dunn faced another shoulder injury and had to sit out almost the entire year as a medical redshirt, Cleveland State transfer Sophomore guard Junior Lamomba had to sit out the NCAA-enforced one-year period, and incoming Freshmen Brandon Austin and Rodney Bullock were suspended for the entire season due to an unspecified violation of team rules. The Friars finished the season at 23–12 overall, the most wins in a season since 1996–1997. Two players received regular season honors, senior point guard Bryce Cotton was named All-Big East First Team and Senior forward Kadeem Batts earned All-Big East Second Team accolades. Entering the Big East Tournament, the Friars played as the 4th seed due to losing the tie-breaker with Xavier. They defeated St. John's in the Quarterfinals, Seton Hall in the semifinals, and Creighton in the thrilling final at Madison Square Garden, claiming PC's second tournament title in Big East history. By winning the Big East Tournament the team earned an automatic bid, removing any "bubble" fears. On their way to making history as the first tournament champion of the reconfigured league, Junior forward Ladontae Henton was named to the All-Tournament Team and Senior guard Bryce Cotton was named the tournaments Most Outstanding Player. On selection Sunday, the Friars were given the 11th seed in the 2014 NCAA tournament East Regional and faced the UNC. The Friars lost 77–79, but en route Bryce Cotton scored a career high 36 points, making him the 4th all-time leading scorer in Providence College basketball history. Despite the loss, the season marked yet another major step forward by Ed Cooley & Co. in rebuilding the PC basketball program.

==== 2021–2022 season — Big East regular season champions / NCAA tournament ====
After a disappointing campaign the previous season marred by a COVID-19 shortened schedule and no fans, Ed Cooley led the Friars to their first regular season championship in Big East History with an overall record of 24–4 and 14–3 within the conference. The Friars clinched the title at home in front of a sold out Dunkin Donuts Center crowd. The Friars spent most of this season ranked in the AP and Coaches top 25 Polls reaching as high as 8/9 on Feb 14, 2022.

==== 2022-2023 season — Coach Cooley's final season with the Friars ====
The Friars finished their season with a 13–7 record in Big East play and a 21–12 record overall, including a loss to UConn in the Big East tournament quarterfinals and a First Round loss to the University of Kentucky in the NCAA tournament. On March 20, 2023, Coach Cooley resigned as head coach at Providence to become the head coach at Georgetown University. Cooley's decision to leave Providence prompted intense backlash from students and fans that was described in a lawsuit by a former employee of the school's athletic department as "racially charged, abusive and intrusive." The school denied those charges.

=== English era: 2023–-2026 ===
On March 23, 2023, Providence hired George Mason University head coach Kim English as the 16th head coach in program history. On March 13, 2026, after 3 seasons without an appearance in the NCAA tournament, English was fired.

=== Hodgson era: 2026–present ===
On March 22, 2026, Providence announced that University of South Florida head coach Bryan Hodgson would be the school's new head coach.

== Current team ==
=== Roster ===
| Name | Position | Year | No. | Height | Weight | Hometown | Last School |
|---|---|---|---|---|---|---|---|
| Jason Edwards | G | Gr. | 1 | 6-1 | 180 | Atlanta, Georgia | Vanderbilt |
| Jaylin Sellers | G | Gr. | 2 | 6-5 | 205 | Columbus, Georgia | Central Florida |
| Daquan Davis | G | So. | 3 | 6-1 | 185 | Baltimore, Maryland | Florida State |
| Jaylen Harrell | G/F | Fr. | 4 | 6-5 | 210 | Boston, Massachusetts | Cambridge Arts Technology and Science Academy |
| Jamier Jones | F | Fr. | 5 | 6-6 | 218 | Sarasota, Florida | Oak Ridge HS |
| Stefan Vaaks | G | Fr. | 7 | 6-7 | 206 | Tabasalu, Estonia | Audentes E-Gumnaasium |
| Jack Williams | G | Sr. | 8 | 6-4 | 195 | Ann Arbor, Michigan | Ann Arbor HS |
| Rich Barron | F/G | Jr. | 10 | 6-5 | 225 | Chicago, Illinois | St. Ignatius HS |
| Ryan Mela | G | So. | 11 | 6-7 | 205 | Natick, Massachusetts | Newman School |
| Cole Hargrove | F | Sr. | 13 | 6-8 | 245 | Norristown, Pennsylvania | Drexel |
| Corey Floyd Jr. | G | R-Sr. | 14 | 6-4 | 208 | Franklin, New Jersey | UConn |
| Peteris Pinnis | F | Fr. | 17 | 7-0 | 260 | Salaspils, Latvia | Riga French Lycee |
| Nilavan Jotham Daniels | G | Fr. | 20 | 6-3 | 180 | St. Louis, Missouri | Link Year Prep |
| Duncan Powell | F | Gr. | 31 | 6-8 | 240 | Dallas, Texas | Georgia Tech |
| Oswin Erhunmwunse | C | So. | 55 | 6-10 | 235 | Benin City, Nigeria | Putnam Science Academy |

=== Coaching staff ===
| Name | Title | College |
|---|---|---|
| Bryan Hodgson | Head coach | SUNY Fredonia |
| Dennis Felton | Assistant coach | Howard University |
| Nate Tomlinson | Assistant coach | University of Colorado |
| Kevin Kurbec | Coord. of basketball operations | Providence College |
| Tim Fuller | A.D. of Recruiting | Wake Forest |

== Season-by-season ==
| Season | Overall record | Conference record | Coach | Postseason | Scoring Leader (ppg) | Rebounding Leader (rpg) | Assists Leader (apg) |
|---|---|---|---|---|---|---|---|
| 1926–27 | 8–8 | | Archie Golembeski | | Hector Allen (7.3) | | |
| 1927–28 | 7–9 | | Al McClellan | | John Krieger (9.9) | | |
| 1928–29 | 17–3 | | Al McClellan | | Ed Wineapple (13.9) | | |
| 1929–30 | 15–4 | | Al McClellan | | John Krieger (10.7) | | |
| 1930–31 | 14–5 | | Al McClellan | | Allen Brachen (9.5) | | |
| 1931–32 | 19–5 | | Al McClellan | | Allen Brachen (9.4) | | |
| 1932–33 | 13–3 | | Al McClellan | | Allen Brachen (13.0) | | |
| 1933–34 | 12–5 | | Al McClellan | | Allen Brachen (9.9) | | |
| 1934–35 | 17–5 | | Al McClellan | | Bill Kutniewski (8.0) | | |
| 1935–36 | 14–7 | | Al McClellan | | Ed Bobinski (10.1) | | |
| 1936–37 | 12–10 | | Al McClellan | | Ed Bobinski (9.5) | | |
| 1937–38 | 7–9 | | Al McClellan | | John Crowley (9.8) | | |
| 1938–39 | 4–7 | | Ed Crotty | | Steve Fallon (10.1) | | |
| 1939–40 | 5–9 | | Ed Crotty | | Joe Kwasniewski (9.7) | | |
| 1940–41 | 11–6 | | Ed Crotty | | John Lee (10.3) | | |
| 1941–42 | 13–7 | | Ed Crotty | | Ted McConnon (15.5) | | |
| 1942–43 | 15–5 | | Ed Crotty | | Ted McConnon (15.0) | | |
| 1943–44 | World War II | | | | | | |
| 1944–45 | 5–7 | | Ed Crotty | | John Arzoomanian (19.7) | | |
| 1945–46 | 5–12 | | Ed Crotty | | Henri Ethier (13.9) | | |
| 1946–47 | 8–11 | | Lawrence Drew | | John Sullivan (8.2) | | |
| 1947–48 | 10–10 | | Lawrence Drew | | Ferdinand Sowa (10.7) | | |
| 1948–49 | 7–9 | | Lawrence Drew | | Francis Pelligrino (8.5) | | |
| 1949–50 | 14–9 | | Vin Cuddy | | James Schlimm (15.5) | | |
| 1950–51 | 14–10 | | Vin Cuddy | | James Schlimm (15.7) | | |
| 1951–52 | 14–9 | | Vin Cuddy | | Robert Moran (18.0) | James Schlimm (8.3) | |
| 1952–53 | 11–11 | | Vin Cuddy | | Robert Moran (20.8) | Robert Prendergast (7.8) | |
| 1953–54 | 13–13 | | Vin Cuddy | | Robert Moran (16.0) | | |
| 1954–55 | 9–12 | | Vin Cuddy | | Mike Pascale (17.8) | John Ritch (14.2) | |
| 1955–56 | 14–8 | | Joe Mullaney | | Mike Pascale (15.0) | John Ritch (10.3) | |
| 1956–57 | 15–9 | | Joe Mullaney | | John Ritch (14.4) | | |
| 1957–58 | 18–6 | | Joe Mullaney | | Lenny Wilkens (14.9) | John Woods (8.4) | |
| 1958–59 | 20–7 | | Joe Mullaney | NIT Semifinals | Johnny Egan (20.9) | John Woods (9.6) | |
| 1959–60 | 24–5 | | Joe Mullaney | NIT Finals | James Hadnot (14.8) | James Hadnot (16.3) | |
| 1960–61 | 24–5 | | Joe Mullaney | NIT Champion | James Hadnot (19.3) | James Hadnot (16.4) | |
| 1961–62 | 20–6 | | Joe Mullaney | NIT 1st Round | James Hadnot (18.3) | James Hadnot (13.5) | Vin Ernst (8.7) |
| 1962–63 | 24–4 | | Joe Mullaney | NIT Champion | Raymond Flynn & John Thompson (18.9) | John Thompson (14.0) | |
| 1963–64 | 20–6 | | Joe Mullaney | NCAA 1st Round | John Thompson (26.2) | John Thompson (14.5) | |
| 1964–65 | 24–2 | | Joe Mullaney | NCAA Elite 8 | Jimmy Walker (20.5) | Dexter Westbrook (12.1) | Jimmy Walker (5.2) |
| 1965–66 | 22–5 | | Joe Mullaney | NCAA 1st Round | Jimmy Walker (24.5) | Michael Riordan (9.1) | Jimmy Walker (5.5) |
| 1966–67 | 21–7 | | Joe Mullaney | NIT Quarterfinals | Jimmy Walker (30.4) | Anthony Koski (11.2) | Jimmy Walker (5.1) |
| 1967–68 | 11–14 | | Joe Mullaney | | Alphonse Hayes (15.6) | Anthony Koski (11.2) | |
| 1968–69 | 14–10 | | Joe Mullaney | | Jim Larranaga (19.4) | Raymond Johnson (10.4) | |
| 1969–70 | 14–11 | | Dave Gavitt | | Jim Larranaga (16.3) | Raymond Johnson (10.4) | Jim Larranaga (3.2) |
| 1970–71 | 20–8 | | Dave Gavitt | NIT Quarterfinals | Ernie DiGregorio (18.6) | Nehru King (6.1) | Ernie DiGregorio (6.5) |
| 1971–72 | 21–6 | | Dave Gavitt | NCAA 1st Round | Marvin Barnes (21.6) | Marvin Barnes (15.7) | Ernie DiGregorio (7.9) |
| 1972-73 | 27–4 | | Dave Gavitt | NCAA Final Four | Ernie DiGregorio (24.6) | Marvin Barnes (19.0) | Ernie DiGregorio (8.6) |
| 1973–74 | 28–4 | | Dave Gavitt | NCAA Sweet 16 | Marvin Barnes (22.1) | Marvin Barnes (18.7) | Kevin Stacom (5.3) |
| 1974–75 | 20–11 | | Dave Gavitt | NIT Finals | Joe Hassett (16.5) | Bill Eason (7.9) | Rick Santos (4.5) |
| 1975–76 | 21–11 | | Dave Gavitt | NIT Semifinals | Joe Hassett (17.0) | Bruce Campbell (8.5) | Bob Misevicius (4.8) |
| 1976–77 | 24–5 | | Dave Gavitt | NCAA 1st Round | Joe Hassett (18.8) | Bruce Campbell (8.1) | Dwight Williams (5.1) |
| 1977–78 | 24–8 | | Dave Gavitt | NCAA 1st Round | Bruce Campbell (17.4) | Bill Eason (8.3) | Bob Misevicius (5.5) |
| 1978–79 | 10–16 | | Dave Gavitt | | Rudy Williams (17.8) | Rudy Williams (9.0) | David Frye (5.0) |
| 1979–80 | 11–6 | 0–6 | Gary Walters | | Jerry Scott (14.9) | Rudy Williams (7.6) | Ricky Tucker (5.3) |
| 1980–81 | 10–18 | 3–11 | Gary Walters | | Rich Hunger (12.0) | Rich Hunger (6.7) | Jim Panaggio (3.9) |
| 1981–82 | 10–17 | 2–12 | Joe Mullaney | | Ron Jackson (16.2) | Otis Thorpe (8.0) | Jim Panaggio (4.0) |
| 1982–83 | 12–19 | 4–12 | Joe Mullaney | | Ron Jackson (18.3) | Otis Thorpe (8.0) | Ricky Tucker (6.1) |
| 1983–84 | 15–14 | 5–11 | Joe Mullaney | | Otis Thorpe (17.1) | Otis Thorpe (10.3) | Harold Starks (3.3) |
| 1984–85 | 11–20 | 3–13 | Joe Mullaney | | Donald Brown (9.5) | Ray Knight (6.0) | Harold Starks (3.8) |
| 1985–86 | 17–14 | 7–9 | Rick Pitino | NIT Quarterfinals | Billy Donovan (15.1) | Steve Wright (7.3) | Billy Donovan (4.7) |
| 1986–87 | 25–9 | 10–6 | Rick Pitino | NCAA Final Four | Billy Donovan (20.6) | David Kipfer (5.3) | Billy Donovan (7.2) |
| 1987–88 | 11–17 | 5–11 | Gordie Chiesa | | Delray Brooks (13.5) | Steve Wright (6.5) | Eric Murdock (3.8) |
| 1988–89 | 18–11 | 7–9 | Rick Barnes | NCAA 1st Round | Eric Murdock (16.2) | Marty Conlon (7.0) | Carlton Screen (6.8) |
| 1989–90 | 17–12 | 8–8 | Rick Barnes | NCAA 1st Round | Eric Murdock (15.4) | Marty Conlon (7.5) | Carlton Screen (7.0) |
| 1990–91 | 19–13 | 7–9 | Rick Barnes | NIT Quarterfinals | Eric Murdock (25.6) | Marques Bragg (8.8) | Eric Murdock (4.6) |
| 1991–92 | 14–17 | 6–12 | Rick Barnes | | Marques Bragg (11.3) | Michael Smith (10.3) | Trent Forbes (3.4) |
| 1992–93 | 20–13 | 9–9 | Rick Barnes | NIT Semifinals | Michael Smith (11.8) | Michael Smith (11.4) | Abdul Abdullah (5.7) |
| 1993–94 | 20–10 | 10–8 | Rick Barnes | NCAA 1st Round | Eric Williams (15.7) | Michael Smith (11.5) | Abdul Abdullah (8.0) |
| 1994–95 | 17–13 | 7–11 | Pete Gillen | NIT 2nd Round | Eric Williams (17.7) | Troy Brown (7.9) | Michael Brown (3.9) |
| 1995–96 | 18–12 | 9–9 | Pete Gillen | NIT 2nd Round | Austin Croshere (15.3) | Rubén Garcés (7.5) | God Shammgod (6.5) |
| 1996–97 | 24–12 | 10–8 | Pete Gillen | NCAA Elite 8 | Austin Croshere (17.9) | Rubén Garcés (7.8) | God Shammgod (6.6) |
| 1997–98 | 13–16 | 7–11 | Pete Gillen | | Jamel Thomas (18.5) | Jamel Thomas (6.9) | Kendrick Moore (3.2) |
| 1998–99 | 16–14 | 9–9 | Tim Welsh | NIT 1st Round | Jamel Thomas (22.0) | Jamel Thomas (7.2) | John Linehan (3.8) |
| 1999–00 | 11–19 | 4–12 | Tim Welsh | | Erron Maxey (14.8) | Karim Shabazz (8.2) | Abdul Mills (2.2) |
| 2000–01 | 21–10 | 11–5 | Tim Welsh | NCAA 1st Round | Erron Maxey (11.4) | Karim Shabazz (7.4) | John Linehan (3.9) |
| 2001–02 | 15–16 | 6–10 | Tim Welsh | | Abdul Mills (14.5) | Ryan Gomes (7.8) | John Linehan (4.4) |
| 2002–03 | 18–14 | 8–8 | Tim Welsh | NIT 2nd Round | Ryan Gomes (18.4) | Ryan Gomes (9.7) | Donnie McGrath (4.3) |
| 2003–04 | 20–9 | 11–5 | Tim Welsh | NCAA 1st Round | Ryan Gomes (18.9) | Ryan Gomes (9.4) | Donnie McGrath (3.4) |
| 2004–05 | 14–17 | 4–12 | Tim Welsh | | Ryan Gomes (21.6) | Ryan Gomes (8.2) | Donnie McGrath (3.8) |
| 2005–06 | 12–15 | 5–11 | Tim Welsh | | Donnie McGrath (15.1) | Geoff McDermott (9.0) | Sharaud Curry (3.5) |
| 2006–07 | 18–13 | 8–8 | Tim Welsh | NIT 1st Round | Herbert Hill (18.1) | Geoff McDermott (9.1) | Geoff McDermott (5.1) |
| 2007–08 | 15–16 | 6–12 | Tim Welsh | | Jeff Xavier (12.4) | Geoff McDermott (8.1) | Geoff McDermott (4.9) |
| 2008–09 | 19–14 | 10–8 | Keno Davis | NIT 1st Round | Weyinmi Efejuku (15.7) | Geoff McDermott (8.5) | Sharaud Curry (4.2) |
| 2009–10 | 12–19 | 4–14 | Keno Davis | | Jamine Peterson (19.6) | Jamine Peterson (10.2) | Vincent Council (4.5) |
| 2010–11 | 15–17 | 4–14 | Keno Davis | | Marshon Brooks (24.6) | Marshon Brooks (7.0) | Vincent Council (5.9) |
| 2011–12 | 15–17 | 4–14 | Ed Cooley | | Vincent Council (15.9) | LaDontae Henton (8.6) | Vincent Council (7.5) |
| 2012–13 | 19–15 | 9–9 | Ed Cooley | NIT Quarterfinals | Bryce Cotton (19.7) | LaDontae Henton (8.3) | Vincent Council (6.8) |
| 2013–14 | 23–12 | 10–8 | Ed Cooley | NCAA 1st Round | Bryce Cotton (21.8) | LaDontae Henton (7.9) | Bryce Cotton (5.9) |
| 2014–15 | 22–12 | 11–7 | Ed Cooley | NCAA 1st Round | LaDontae Henton (19.7) | LaDontae Henton (6.5) | Kris Dunn (7.5) |
| 2015–16 | 24–11 | 10–8 | Ed Cooley | NCAA 2nd Round | Ben Bentil (21.1) | Ben Bentil (7.7) | Kris Dunn (6.2) |
| 2016–17 | 20–13 | 10–8 | Ed Cooley | NCAA First Four | Rodney Bullock (15.7) | Rodney Bullock (6.4) | Kyron Cartwright (6.7) |
| 2017–18 | 21–14 | 10–8 | Ed Cooley | NCAA 1st Round | Rodney Bullock (14.3) | Alpha Diallo (6.6) | Kyron Cartwright (5.8) |
| 2018–19 | 18–16 | 7–11 | Ed Cooley | NIT 1st Round | Alpha Diallo (16.0) | Alpha Diallo (8.1) | Alpha Diallo (3.1) |
| 2019–20 | 19–12 | 12–6 | Ed Cooley | NCAA Canceled due to COVID-19 | Alpha Diallo (14.1) | Alpha Diallo (7.8) | David Duke (3.1) |
| 2020–21 | 13–13 | 9–10 | Ed Cooley | | Nate Watson (16.9) | Nate Watson (6.7) | David Duke (4.8) |
| 2021–22 | 27–6 | 14–3 | Ed Cooley | NCAA Sweet 16 | Aljami Durham (13.7) | Noah Horchler (8.5) | Jared Bynum (4.0) |
| 2022–23 | 21–12 | 13–7 | Ed Cooley | NCAA 1st Round | Bryce Hopkins (15.8) | Bryce Hopkins (8.5) | Jared Bynum (4.3) |
| 2023-24 | 21-14 | 10-10 | Kim English | NIT 1st Round | Devin Carter (19.7) | Devin Carter (8.7) | Devin Carter (3.6) |
| 2024-25 | 12-20 | 6-14 | Kim English | | Bensley Joseph (13.2) | Oswin Erhunmwunse (5.6) | Bensley Joseph & Jayden Pierre (3.2) |
| 2025-26 | 15-18 | 7-13 | Kim English | | Jaylin Sellers (18.3) | Oswin Erhunmwunse (8.3) | Stefan Vaaks (3.2) |

== Postseason ==
=== NCAA tournament results ===
The Friars have appeared in the NCAA tournament 22 times. Their combined record is 17–23.

| Year | Seed | Round | Opponent | Result |
|---|---|---|---|---|
| 1964 | | First round | Villanova | L 66–77 |
| 1965 | | First round Sweet Sixteen; Elite Eight | West Virginia; Saint Joseph's; Princeton | W 91–67; W 81–73 ^{OT} L 69–109 |
| 1966 | | First round | Saint Joseph's | L 48–65 |
| 1972 | | First round | Penn | L 60–76 |
| 1973 | | First round Sweet Sixteen; Elite Eight; Final Four; National 3rd-place game | Saint Joseph's; Penn; Maryland; Memphis; Indiana | W 89–76; W 87–65; W 103–89; L 85–98; L 79–97 |
| 1974 | | First round Sweet Sixteen; Regional 3rd-place game | Penn; NC State; Furman | W 84–69; L 78–82; W 95–83 |
| 1977 | | First round | Kansas State | L 80–87 |
| 1978 | | First round | Michigan State | L 63–77 |
| 1987 | #6 | First round Second Round; Sweet Sixteen; Elite Eight; Final Four | #11 UAB #14 Austin Peay #2 Alabama #1 Georgetown #2 Syracuse | W 90–68; W 90–87 ^{OT} W 103–82; W 88–73; L 63–77 |
| 1989 | #12 | First round | #5 Virginia | L 97–100 |
| 1990 | #8 | First round | #9 Ohio State | L 83–84 ^{OT} |
| 1994 | #8 | First round | #9 Alabama | L 70–76 |
| 1997 | #10 | First round Second Round; Sweet Sixteen; Elite Eight | #7 Marquette #2 Duke #14 Chattanooga #4 Arizona | W 81–59; W 98–87; W 71–65; L 92–96 ^{OT} |
| 2001 | #10 | First round | #7 Penn State | L 59–69 |
| 2004 | #5 | First round | #12 Pacific | L 58–66 |
| 2014 | #11 | First round | #6 North Carolina | L 77–79 |
| 2015 | #6 | First round | #11 Dayton | L 53–66 |
| 2016 | #9 | First round Second Round | #8 USC #1 North Carolina | W 70–69; L 66–85 |
| 2017 | #11 | First Four | #11 USC | L 71–75 |
| 2018 | #10 | First round | #7 Texas A&M | L 69–73 |
| 2022 | #4 | First round Second Round; Sweet Sixteen | #13 South Dakota State #12 Richmond #1 Kansas | W 66–57; W 79–51; L 61–66 |
| 2023 | #11 | First round | #6 Kentucky | L 53–61 |

=== NIT results ===
The Friars have appeared in the National Invitation Tournament (NIT) 20 times. Their combined record is 32–21. They are two-time NIT Champions (1961, 1963).

| Year | Round | Opponent | Result |
|---|---|---|---|
| 1959 | First round Quarterfinals; Semifinals; 3rd-place game | Manhattan; Saint Louis; St. John's; NYU | W 68–66; W 75–72; L 55–76; L 75–71 |
| 1960 | First round Quarterfinals; Semifinals; Final | Memphis; Saint Louis; Utah State; Bradley | W 71–70; W 64–53; W 68–62; L 72–88 |
| 1961 | First round Quarterfinals; Semifinals; Final | DePaul; Niagara; Holy Cross; Saint Louis | W 73–67; W 71–68; W 90–83; W 62–59 |
| 1962 | First round | Temple | L 78–80 |
| 1963 | Quarterfinals; Semifinals; Final | Miami (FL); Marquette; Canisius | W 106–96; W 70–64; W 81–66 |
| 1967 | First round Quarterfinals | Memphis; Marquette | W 77–68; L 80–81 |
| 1971 | First round Quarterfinals | Louisville; North Carolina | W 64–58; L 79–86 |
| 1975 | First round Quarterfinals; Semifinals; Final | Clemson; Pittsburgh; St. John's; Princeton | W 91–84; W 101–80; W 85–72; L 69–80 |
| 1976 | First round Quarterfinals; Semifinals; 3rd-place game | North Carolina A&T; Louisville; Kentucky; NC State | W 84–68; W 73–67; L 78–79; L 69–74 |
| 1986 | First round Second Round; Quarterfinals | Boston University; George Mason; Louisiana Tech | W 72–69; W 90–71; L 63–64 |
| 1991 | First round Second Round; Quarterfinals | James Madison; West Virginia; Oklahoma | W 98–93; W 85–79; L 74–83 |
| 1993 | First round Second Round; Quarterfinals; Semifinals; 3rd-place game | James Madison; West Virginia; Boston College; Minnesota; UAB | W 73–61; W 68–67; W 75–58; L 70–76; L 52–55 |
| 1995 | First round Second Round | College of Charleston; Virginia Tech | W 72–67; L 78–91 |
| 1996 | First round Second Round | Fairfield; Saint Joseph's | W 91–79; L 62–82 |
| 1999 | First round | NC State | L 86–92 |
| 2003 | Opening Round; First round Second Round | Richmond; College of Charleston; Georgetown | W 67–49; W 69–64; L 58–67 |
| 2007 | First round | Bradley | L 78–90 |
| 2009 | First round | Miami (FL) | L 66–78 |
| 2013 | First round Second Round; Quarterfinals | Charlotte; Robert Morris; Baylor | W 75–66; W 77–68; L 68–79 |
| 2019 | First round | Arkansas | L 72–84 |
| 2024 | First round | Boston College | L 57-62 |

=== NAIA tournament results ===
The Friars have appeared in the NAIA tournament once. Their record is 0–1.

| Year | Round | Opponent | Result |
|---|---|---|---|
| 1951 | First round | Morningside | L 63–66 |

== Awards and honors ==
=== Individual Coaching honors ===
National Coach of the Year
| 1987 | Rick Pitino | NABC, Sporting News |
| 2022 | Ed Cooley | Naismith |

Big East Conference Coach of the Year
| 2022 | Ed Cooley |

New England Coach of the Year

| 1964 | Joe Mullaney |
| 1965 | Joe Mullaney |
| 1966 | Joe Mullaney |

| 1971 | Dave Gavitt |
| 1972 | Dave Gavitt |
| 1973 | Dave Gavitt |

| 1977 | Dave Gavitt |
| 1987 | Rick Pitino |
| 1989 | Rick Barnes |

=== Individual Player honors ===
National Defensive Player of the Year
| 2002 | John Linehan | NABC |

Big East Conference Player of the Year
| 2015 | Kris Dunn |
| 2016 | Kris Dunn |
| 2024 | Devin Carter |

New England Player of the Year

| 1929 | Edward Wineapple |
| 1960 | Len Wilkins |
| 1964 | John Thompson |
| 1967 | Jimmy Walker |
| 1973 | Ernie DiGregorio |

| 1974 | Marvin Barnes |
| 1978 | Dwight Williams |
| 1987 | Billy Donovan |
| 1991 | Eric Murdock |

Conference Individual Awards
| 2001 | John Linehan | Big East Defensive Player of the Year |
| 2002 | John Linehan | Big East Defensive Player of the Year |
| 2007 | Herbert Hill | Big East Most Improved Player |
| 2013 | Kadeem Batts | Big East Most Improved Player |
| 2015 | Kris Dunn | Big East Defensive Player of the Year |
| 2016 | Kris Dunn | Big East Defensive Player of the Year |
| 2016 | Ben Bentil | Big East Most Improved Player |
| 2017 | Kyron Cartwright | Big East Most Improved Player |
| 2020 | Emmitt Holt | Big East Sportsmanship Award |
| 2022 | Jared Bynum | Big East Sixth Man of the Year |

All-Conference team selections

| Year | Name | Pos. |
|---|---|---|
| 1984 | Otis Thorpe† | F |
| 1987 | Billy Donovan† | G |
| 1990 | Carlton Screen‡ | G |
| 1991 | Eric Murdock† | G |
| 1993 | Michael Smith‡ | F |
| 1994 | Michael Smith‡ | F |
| 1995 | Eric Williams† | F |
| 1997 | Austin Croshere† | F |
| 1998 | Jamel Thomas‡ | G |
| 1999 | Jamel Thomas† | G |
| 2001 | John Linehan‡ | G |
| 2002 | John Linehan‡ | G |

| Year | Name | Pos. |
|---|---|---|
| 2003 | Ryan Gomes‡ | G |
| 2004 | Ryan Gomes† | G |
| 2005 | Ryan Gomes† | G |
| 2006 | Donnie McGrath‡ | G |
| 2004 | Herbert Hill† | F |
| 2011 | MarShon Brooks† | F |
| 2013 | Bryce Cotton† | G |
| 2014 | Bryce Cotton† | G |
| 2014 | Kadeem Batts‡ | F |
| 2015 | LaDontae Henton† | F |
| 2015 | Kris Dunn† | G |
| 2016 | Kris Dunn† | G |

| Year | Name | Pos. |
|---|---|---|
| 2016 | Ben Bentil† | F |
| 2017 | Rodney Bullock‡ | F |
| 2017 | Kyron Cartwright‡ | G |
| 2019 | Alpha Diallo‡ | F |
| 2020 | Alpha Diallo‡ | F |
| 2021 | David Duke‡ | G |
| 2021 | Nate Watson‡ | F |
| 2022 | Jared Bynum‡ | G |
| 2022 | Nate Watson‡ | F |
| 2023 | Bryce Hopkins† | F |
| 2024 | Devin Carter† | G |

† – denotes First-Team All-Conference
‡ – denotes Second-Team All-Conference

== Former Friars ==
=== National Collegiate Basketball Hall of Fame ===
| Year Inducted | Name | Position | Years at Providence |
|---|---|---|---|
| 2006 | Dave Gavitt | Coach | 1962–1966, 1969–79 |
| 2006 | Lenny Wilkens | Player | 1957–1960 |
| 2006 | John Thompson | Player | 1961–1964 |
| 2019 | Ernie DiGregorio | Player | 1970–1973 |
| 2022 | Jimmy Walker | Player | 1964–1967 |

=== NCAA Men's Basketball All-Americans ===
| Player | Count | Years |
|---|---|---|
| Jimmy Walker | 3 | 1965 (third-team); 1966 (first-team); 1967 (first-team) |
| Ernie DiGregorio | 1 | 1973 (first team) |
| Marvin Barnes | 2 | 1973 (third-team); 1974 (first-team) |
| Ryan Gomes | 1 | 2004 (first-team) |
| Kris Dunn | 1 | 2016 (second-team) |

"Friars Legends"
| Number | Player | Years | Date |
| Coach | Joe Mullaney | 1955–69; 1981–85 | January 6, 2007 |
| Coach | Dave Gavitt | 1969–79 | January 6, 2007 |
| 14 | Lenny Wilkens | 1957–60 | November 27, 1996 |
| 24 | Jimmy Walker | 1964–67 | March 8, 2008 |
| 15 | Ernie DiGregorio | 1970–73 | March 8, 2008 |
| 24 | Marvin Barnes | 1971–74 | March 8, 2008 |
| 34 | Johnny Egan | 1958–61 | February 21, 2009 |
| 10 | Vin Ernst | 1960–63 | February 19, 2011 |
| 14 | Raymond Flynn | 1960–63 | February 19, 2011 |
| 27 | Kevin Stacom | 1972–74 | January 25, 2014 |
| 10 | Joe Hassett | 1973–77 | January 25, 2014 |
| 33 | Otis Thorpe | 1980–84 | February 11, 2017 |
| | Bruce "Soup" Campbell | 1974–78 | February 11, 2017 |

=== Professional players ===
==== Friars in the NBA ====
| Player | Pos. | Team |
|---|---|---|
| Kris Dunn | PG | Los Angeles Clippers |
| Devin Carter | PG/SG | Boston Celtics |
| Josh Oduro | PF | New Orleans Pelicans |
| Jaylin Sellers | SG | Chicago Bulls |

==== Friars in the NBA G-League ====
| Player | Pos. | Team | NBA Affiliate |
|---|---|---|---|
| Jabri Abdur-Rahim | SF | Oklahoma City Blue | Thunder |
| Justin Minaya | SF | Osceola Magic | Magic |

==== Friars playing abroad ====
| Player | Pos. | Team | Country |
|---|---|---|---|
| Ben Bentil | PF | Hapoel Tel Aviv | (Israel) |
| Bryce Cotton | PG | Perth Wildcats | (Australia) |
| Alpha Diallo | SF | Monaco Basket | (France) |
| David Duke Jr. | PG | Bàsquet Manresa | (Spain) |
| Al Durham | PG | Vanoli Cremona | (Italy) |
| Noah Horchler | PF | Santeros de Aguada | (Puerto Rico) |
| Tuukka Kotti | PF | Tapiolan Honka | (Finland) |
| Noah Locke | SG | Cholet Basket | (France) |
| Nate Watson | PF | Panionios B.C. | (Greece) |

=== All-time NBA draft ===
44 Friars have been selected in the NBA draft.

| Name | NBA Draft | Draft Team | Years | Career Highlights and Awards |
|---|---|---|---|---|
| Lenny Wilkens | 1960 Round 1, Pick 6 | St. Louis Hawks | 1960–1975 | 9× NBA All-Star (1963–1965, 1967–1971, 1973); NBA All-Star Game MVP (1971); NBA assists leader (1970); NBA anniversary teams (50th, 75th); No. 19 retired by Seattle SuperSonics |
| Johnny Egan | 1961 Round 2, Pick 12 | Detroit Pistons | 1961–1972 | |
| Jim Hadnot | 1962 Round 3, Pick 25 | Boston Celtics | | |
| Raymond Flynn | 1963 Round 4, Pick 33 | Syracuse Nats | | |
| Vin Ernst | 1963, Round 6, Pick 53 | Boston Celtics | | |
| John Thompson | 1964 Round 3, Pick 27 | Boston Celtics | 1964–1966 | 2× NBA champion (1965, 1966) |
| Jimmy Walker | 1967 Round 1, Pick 1 | Detroit Pistons | 1967–1976 | 2× NBA All-Star (1970, 1972) |
| Dexter Westbrook | 1967, Round 5, Pick 44 | Baltimore Bullets | 1967–1968 | |
| Mike Riordan | 1967, Round 12, Pick 128 | New York Knicks | 1967–1977 | NBA champion (1970); NBA All-Defensive Second Team (1973) |
| Jim Larranaga | 1971 Round 6, Pick 96 | Detroit Pistons | | |
| Ernie DiGregorio | 1973 Round 1, Pick 3 | Buffalo Braves | 1973–1978 | NBA Rookie of the Year (1974); NBA All-Rookie First Team (1974); NBA assists leader (1974) |
| Kevin Stacom | 1973, Round 2, Pick 24 | Chicago Bulls | | |
| Fran Costello | 1973, Round 5, Pick 71 | Portland Trail Blazers | | |
| Marvin Barnes | 1974 Round 1, Pick 2 | Philadelphia 76ers | 1976–1980 | |
| Kevin Stacom | 1974, Round 2, Pick 35 | Boston Celtics | 1974–1982 | NBA champion (1976) |
| Steve Strother | 1975 Round 9, Pick 154 | Houston Rockets | | |
| Mark McAndrew | 1976 Round 8, Pick 136 | Buffalo Braves | | |
| Joe Hassett | 1977 Round 3, Pick 52 | Seattle SuperSonics | 1977–1983 | NBA champion (1979) |
| Bob Cooper | 1977, Round 6, Pick 119 | Kansas City Kings | | |
| Bob Misevicius | 1978 Round 6, Pick 112 | Buffalo Braves | | |
| Bruce Campbell | 1978, Round 8, Pick 153 | New Jersey Nets | | |
| Dwight Williams | 1979 Round 6, Pick 121 | Atlanta Hawks | | |
| John Nolan | 1980 Round 10, Pick 214 | Boston Celtics | | |
| Rudy Williams | 1981 Round 9, Pick 186 | New Jersey Nets | | |
| Ron Jackson | 1983 Round 7, Pick 160 | Boston Celtics | | |
| Otis Thorpe | 1984 Round 1, Pick 9 | Kansas City Kings | 1984–2001 | NBA champion (1994); NBA All-Star (1992) |
| Ray Knight | 1985 Round 5, Pick 114 | Milwaukee Bucks | | |
| Billy Donovan | 1987 Round 3, Pick 68 | Utah Jazz | 1987–1988 | |
| Abdul Shamsid-Deen | 1990 Round 2, Pick 54 | Seattle SuperSonics | | |
| Eric Murdock | 1991 Round 1, Pick 21 | Utah Jazz | 1991–2000 | |
| Dickey Simpkins | 1994 Round 1, Pick 21 | Chicago Bulls | 1994–2002 | 3× NBA champion (1996–1998) |
| Michael Smith | 1994, Round 2, Pick 35 | Sacramento Kings | 1994–2001 | |
| Eric Williams | 1995 Round 1, Pick 14 | Boston Celtics | 1995–2007 | |
| Troy Brown | 1995, Round 2, Pick 45 | Atlanta Hawks | | |
| Austin Croshere | 1997 Round 1, Pick 12 | Indiana Pacers | 1997–2009 | |
| God Shammgod | 1997, Round 2, Pick 46 | Washington Wizards | 1997–1998 | |
| Marcus Douthit | 2004 Round 2, Pick 56 | Los Angeles Lakers | | |
| Ryan Gomes | 2005 Round 2, Pick 50 | Boston Celtics | 2005–2014 | NBA All-Rookie Second Team (2006) |
| Herbert Hill | 2007 Round 2, Pick 55 | Utah Jazz | | |
| MarShon Brooks | 2011 Round 1, Pick 25 | Boston Celtics | 2011–2019 | NBA All-Rookie Second Team (2012) |
| Ricardo Ledo | 2013 Round 2, Pick 43 | Milwaukee Bucks | 2013–2015 | |
| Kris Dunn | 2016 Round 1, Pick 5 | Minnesota Timberwolves | 2016–present | |
| Ben Bentil | 2016 Round 2, Pick 51 | Boston Celtics | 2016–2017 | |
| Devin Carter | 2024 Round 1, Pick 13 | Sacramento Kings | 2024–present | |

=== Former Friars ===
- Justin Acker — Executive, WME/IMG
- Chris Anrin — former international professional basketball player
- Brandon Austin — former NBA G-League player
- Marvin Barnes — former NBA and ABA all-star player
- Ira Bowman — former NBA player
- Marques Bragg — former NBA player
- Marshon Brooks — former NBA player with New Jersey Nets
- Derrick Brown — former international professional basketball player
- Michael Brown — former international professional basketball player
- Troy Brown — former NBA player
- Rodney Bullock — former international player
- Kyron Cartwright — former international player
- Vincent Council — former international player
- Marty Conlon — former NBA player
- Rick Cordella — Vice President & General Manager, NBC Sports Digital
- Austin Croshere — former NBA player
- Sharaud Curry — former international professional basketball player
- Ernie DiGregorio — former NBA player
- Billy Donovan — two-time NCAA Men's Division I Basketball Championship head coach of Florida Gators men's basketball
- Marcus Douthit — NBA and international professional basketball player
- Jacek Duda — former international professional basketball player
- Weyinmi Efejuku — international professional basketball player
- Johnny Egan — former NBA player and coach
- Raymond Flynn — former mayor of Boston
- Trent Forbes — international professional basketball player
- Rubén Garcés — former NBA and international professional basketball player
- Ryan Gomes — former NBA player with Los Angeles Clippers
- Randall Hanke — international professional basketball player
- Eric Harris — former international professional basketball player
- Tyler Harris — former NBA G-League player
- Joe Hassett — former NBA player
- LaDontae Henton — former NBA G-League and international player
- Herbert Hill — former NBA and international professional basketball player
- Sheiku Kabba — international professional basketball player
- Jonathan Kale — international professional basketball player
- Tuukka Kotti — international professional basketball player
- Ricardo Ledo — former NBA, G-League, and international player
- Jim Larranaga — head coach of Miami Hurricanes men's basketball
- Māris Ļaksa — international professional basketball player
- John Linehan — international professional basketball player
- Michael Malone — NBA head coach for the Denver Nuggets
- Erron Maxey — international professional basketball player
- Geoff McDermott — international professional basketball player
- Ken McDonald — head coach of Western Kentucky Hilltopers men's basketball
- Donnie McGrath — international professional basketball player
- Brian McKenzie — international professional basketball player
- Abdul Mills — former international professional basketball player
- Duke Mondy — former NBA G-League and international player
- Eric Murdock — former NBA player
- Jason Murdock — former international professional basketball player
- Jamine Peterson — international professional basketball player
- Rob Phelps — former international professional basketball player
- Richard Pitino — head basketball coach for University of New Mexico
- Mike Riordan — former NBA player
- Rob Sanders — former international professional basketball player
- Karim Shabazz — international professional basketball player
- God Shammgod — former NBA player
- Abdul Shamsid-Deen — former international professional basketball player
- Dickey Simpkins — former NBA player
- Kevin Simpson — former international professional basketball player
- Michael Smith — former NBA player
- Kevin Stacom — former NBA player
- Piotr Szybilski — former international professional basketball player
- Jamel Thomas — former NBA player
- Garnett Thompson — international professional basketball player
- John Thompson — former Basketball Hall of Fame head coach of Georgetown Hoyas men's basketball
- Otis Thorpe — former NBA all-star player
- Orlando Vega — former international professional basketball player
- Jimmy Walker — former NBA all-star player
- Franklin Western — international professional basketball player
- Lenny Wilkens — Basketball Hall of Fame coach and player
- Eric Williams — former NBA player
- Jeff Xavier — former international professional basketball player
- Maciej Zieliński — former international professional basketball player

=== All-time career leaders ===
Points
| Rank | Player | Years | Points |
|---|---|---|---|
| 1. | Ryan Gomes | 2001–05 | 2,138 |
| 2. | LaDontae Henton | 2011–15 | 2,059 |
| 3. | Jimmy Walker | 1964–67 | 2,045 |
| 4. | Eric Murdock | 1987–91 | 2,021 |
| 5. | Bryce Cotton | 2010–14 | 1,975 |
| 6. | Jamel Thomas | 1995–99 | 1,971 |
| 7. | Marvin Barnes | 1971–74 | 1,839 |
| 8. | Joe Hassett | 1979–83 | 1,828 |
| 9. | Bruce Campbell | 1974–78 | 1,809 |
| 10. | Ernie DiGregorio | 1970–73 | 1,760 |

Rebounds
| Rank | Player | Years | Rebounds |
|---|---|---|---|
| 1. | Marvin Barnes | 1971–74 | 1,592 |
| 2. | Jim Hadnot | 1959–62 | 1,299 |
| 3. | John Thompson | 1961–64 | 1,061 |
| 4. | Geoff McDermott | 2005–09 | 1,055 |
| 5. | LaDontae Henton | 2011–15 | 1,054 |
| 6. | Michael Smith | 1991–94 | 1,038 |
| 7. | Ryan Gomes | 2001–05 | 1,028 |
| 8. | Bruce Campbell | 1974–78 | 949 |
| 9. | Otis Thorpe | 1980–84 | 902 |
| 10. | Billy Eason | 1974–78 | 800 |

Assists
| Rank | Player | Years | Assists |
|---|---|---|---|
| 1. | Vincent Council | 2009–13 | 725 |
| 2. | Ernie DiGregorio | 1970–73 | 662 |
| 3. | Kyron Cartwright | 2014–18 | 646 |
| 4. | Kris Dunn | 2012–16 | 552 |
| 5. | Billy Donovan | 1983–87 | 546 |
| 6. | Carlton Screen | 1986–90 | 532 |
| 7. | Ricky Tucker | 1979–83 | 520 |
| 8. | Bob Misevicius | 1974–78 | 490 |
| 9. | Eric Murdock | 1987–91 | 487 |
| 9. | Vin Ernst | 1960–63 | 487 |

Steals
| Rank | Player | Years | Steals |
|---|---|---|---|
| 1. | John Linehan | 1997–02 | 385 |
| 2. | Eric Murdock | 1987–91 | 376 |
| 3. | Carlton Screen | 1986–90 | 226 |
| 4. | Kris Dunn | 2012–16 | 208 |
| 5. | Harold Starks | 1982–86 | 207 |
| 6. | Geoff McDermott | 2005–09 | 205 |
| 7. | Ryan Gomes | 2001–05 | 181 |
| 7. | Corey Wright | 1996–99 | 181 |
| 9. | Joe Hassett | 1973–77 | 176 |
| 10. | Michael Brown | 1992–96 | 174 |

Blocks
| Rank | Player | Years | Blocks |
|---|---|---|---|
| 1. | Marvin Barnes | 1971–74 | 363 |
| 2. | Marcus Douthit | 2000–04 | 295 |
| 3. | Bob Cooper | 1973–77 | 284 |
| 4. | Herbert Hill | 2003–07 | 189 |
| 5. | Steve Wright | 1984–88 | 184 |
| 6. | Rich Hunger | 1977–81 | 166 |
| 7. | Carson Desrosiers | 2013–15 | 161 |
| 8. | Randall Hanke | 2004–09 | 155 |
| 9. | Bilal Dixon | 2009–12 | 141 |
| 10. | Bob Misevicius | 1974–78 | 121 |

== Arena ==
The Friars played on campus at Alumni Hall from 1955 until 1972. Alumni Hall seated approximately 2,600 fans from 1955 until its renovation in 2012, and now seats approximately 1,850 fans. The team has played at the Amica Mutual Pavilion since its construction in 1972. It is an indoor arena located in downtown Providence, and seats approximately 12,410 fans for basketball games.

In December 2005, the Rhode Island Convention Center Authority purchased the building from the city of Providence and spent $80 million on an extensive renovation, which connected it to the convention center and a nearby luxury hotel. Renovations also included a new Jumbotron, luxury suites, HVAC chiller, upgraded concessions, concourse updates, new seating bowl and other amenities.

== Rivalries ==
=== Villanova ===
The two smallest schools in the original Big East, Providence and the Villanova Wildcats, currently battle at least twice each year during conference play. The two teams first met on February 15, 1936, resulting in a 46–37 Friars victory. Villanova leads the all-time series, 67-42 since 1949-1950. The rivalry is elevated by the Catholic orders which run the schools; Providence's Dominicans and Villanova's Augustinians.

=== Boston College ===
These two New England former Big East rivals now reside in separate conferences, but they still meet occasionally during non-conference play and met in the first round of the 2024 NIT tournament.

=== UConn ===
The only two New England schools in the Big East for its final eight seasons fought for local bragging rights until the 2013 season, when Providence and 6 other teams in the "Catholic 7" broke away to form the new Big East and UConn remained in the now-called American Athletic Conference. UConn joined the new Big East 2020, renewing the rivalry.

=== Rhode Island ===
The Friars and Rams have met 134 times since the 1933–34 college basketball season. The Ocean State Rivalry game is usually played in December, and the venue alternates between the Amica Mutual Pavilion in Providence in odd-numbered years and the Ryan Center on the campus of the University of Rhode Island in Kingston in even-numbered years. Providence leads the series 78–59.

== Participations in FIBA competitions ==
- 1977 FIBA Intercontinental Cup: 6th place
