= Ben Bentil =

Ghanaian basketball player (born 1995)

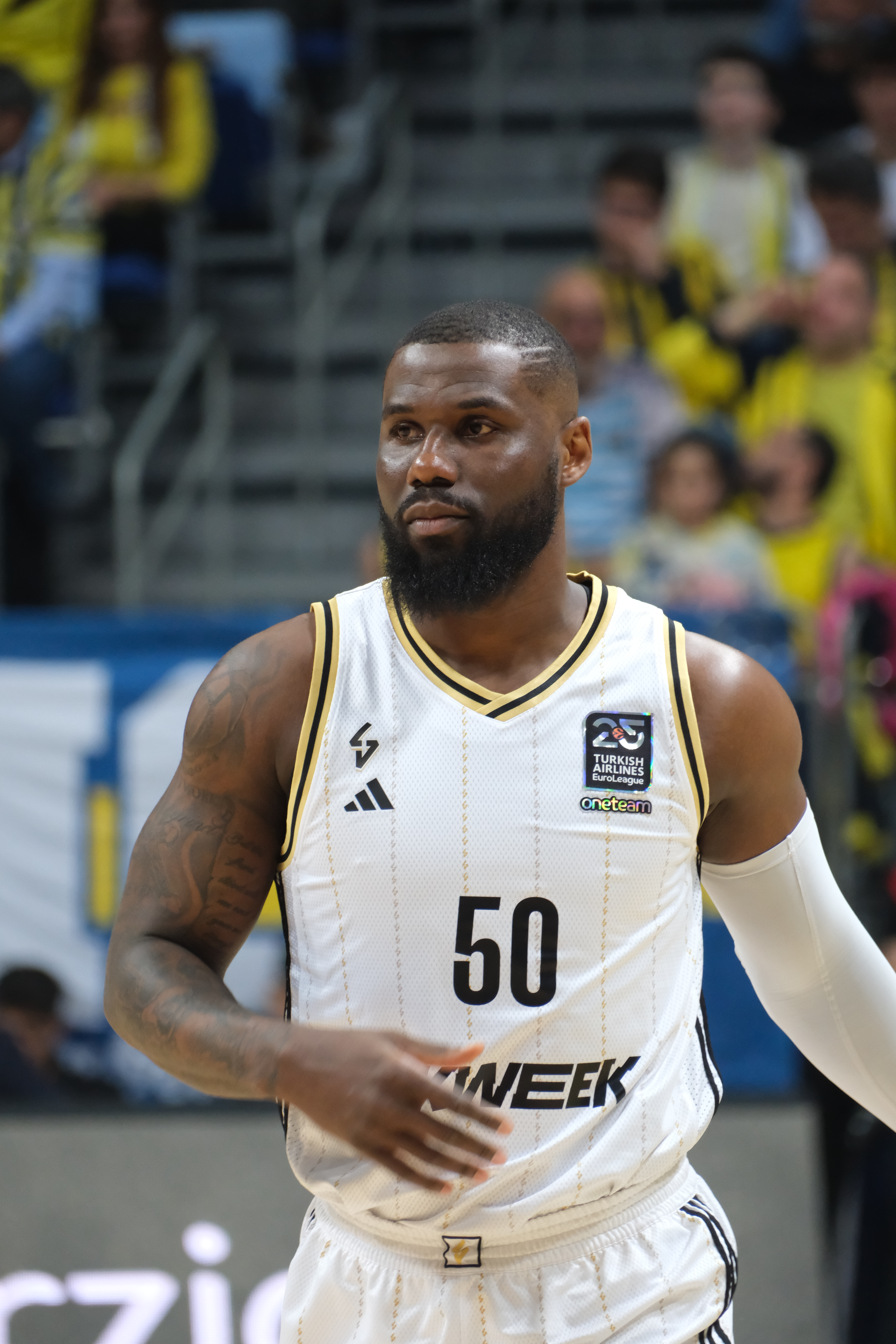
- Bentil with LDLC ASVEL in 2025

No. 50 – Formosa Dreamers
- Position: Power forward / center
- League: Taiwan Professional Basketball League

Personal information
- Born: March 29, 1995 (age 31) Sekondi-Takoradi, Ghana
- Listed height: 2.04 m (6 ft 8 in)
- Listed weight: 107 kg (236 lb)

Career information
- High school: St. Andrew's School (Middletown, Delaware)
- College: Providence (2014–2016)
- NBA draft: 2016: 2nd round, 51st overall pick
- Drafted by: Boston Celtics
- Playing career: 2016–present

Career history
- 2016: Fort Wayne Mad Ants
- 2016: Xinjiang Flying Tigers
- 2017: Fort Wayne Mad Ants
- 2017: Dallas Mavericks
- 2017–2018: Châlons-Reims
- 2018: Bilbao
- 2018–2019: Peristeri
- 2019–2021: Panathinaikos
- 2021: Bahçeşehir Koleji
- 2021–2022: Olimpia Milano
- 2022–2023: Crvena zvezda
- 2023–2024: Gunma Crane Thunders
- 2024: Hapoel Tel Aviv
- 2024–2025: Napoli Basket
- 2025: ASVEL
- 2025: Mersin MSK
- 2026–present: Formosa Dreamers

Career highlights
- TPBL champion (2026); 2× Greek League champion (2020, 2021); Greek League rebounding leader (2019); LBA champion (2022); Greek Cup winner (2021); Italian Cup winner (2022); Serbian League champion (2023); Serbian Cup winner (2023); TPBL Finals MVP (2026); AP Honorable Mention All-American (2016); First-team All-Big East (2016); Big East Most Improved Player (2016)
- Stats at NBA.com
- Stats at Basketball Reference

Benjamin Bentil (born March 29, 1995) is a Ghanaian professional basketball player for the Formosa Dreamers of the Taiwan Professional Basketball League (TPBL). He played two seasons of college basketball for Providence before being drafted 51st overall by the Boston Celtics in the 2016 NBA draft.

== Early life ==
Bentil was sent to the United States from Ghana when he was 15 and Bentil's athletic prowess earned him a scholarship to the Haverford School in Haverford, Pennsylvania before leaving for St. Andrew's School in Middletown, Delaware. He played for the school's soccer and basketball teams, ultimately earning a basketball scholarship at Providence.

== College career ==
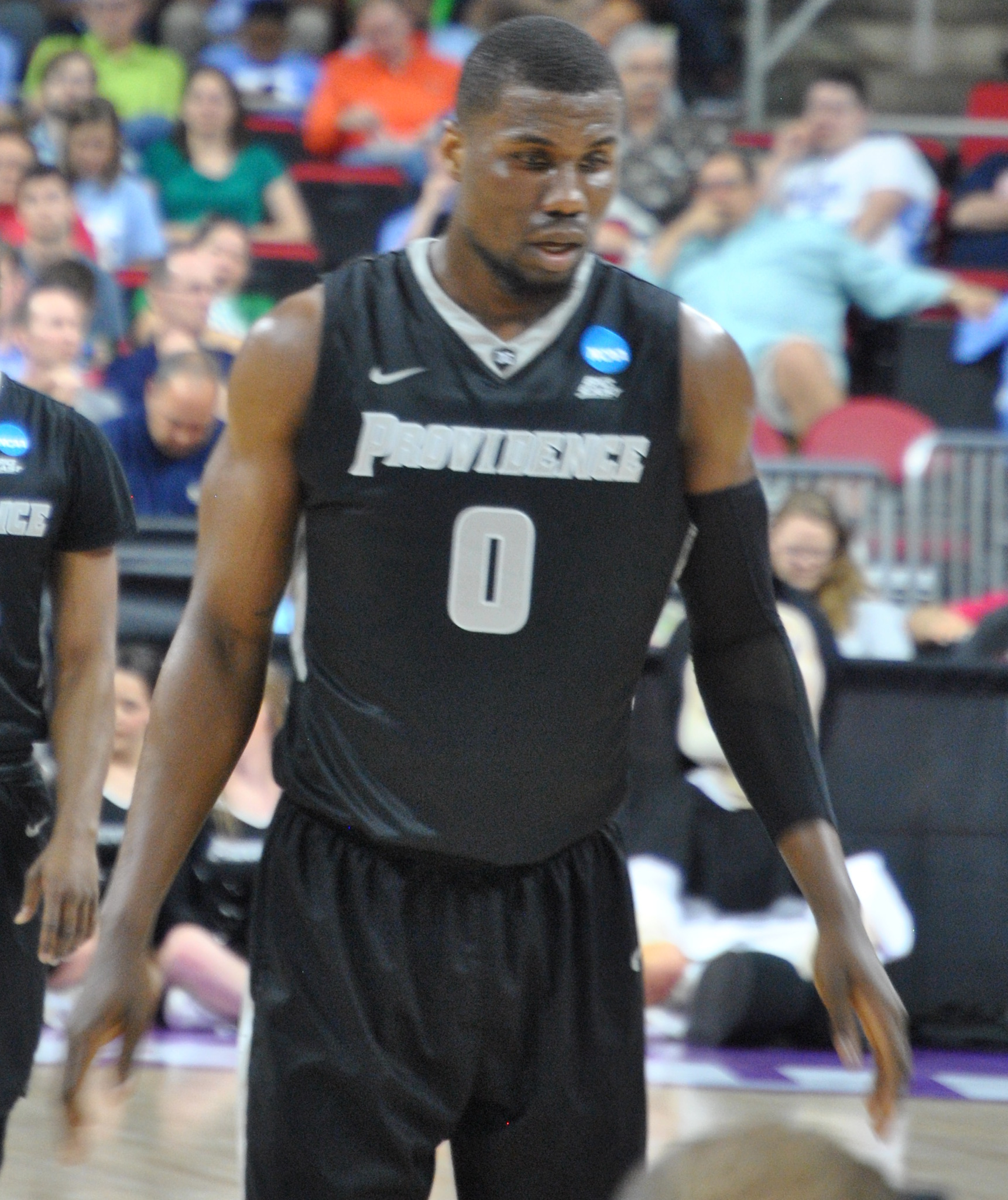
Bentil at Providence in 2016.

As a freshman at Providence College, Bentil started 23 of the Friars' 34 games, while averaging 6.4 points, 4.9 rebounds and 21.5 minutes per game. He began to come into his own toward the end of the season, as he posted five double-doubles during his last 12 games, including a 21-point, 10 rebound performance on March 4 against Seton Hall.

Bentil broke out during his sophomore campaign, and he and teammate Kris Dunn – a consensus All-American – became one of the top one-two punches in college basketball. He led the Big East Conference with 21.1 points per game, 7.7 rebounds per game, field goal makes (246) and free throw makes (194). He also finished fifth in the conference in field goal percentage (46.2 percent), sixth in free throw percentage (78.2 percent), fourth in rebounds per game (7.7) and third in win shares (3.8). He started 32 of Providence's 35 games, scored in double-figures on 31 occasions, notched at least 20 points 21 times and tallied at least 30 points five times. Bentil recorded 31 points and a career-high-tying 13 rebounds on January 24 during an overtime win on the home court of eventual NCAA champion Villanova. Two and a half weeks later, he scored a career-best 42 points during a double-overtime loss at Marquette. The effort included a 14-for-17 clip from the free throw line and 12 rebounds. He hovered right around his season averages during the Friars' two-game NCAA tournament run, posting 20.0 PPG and 6.0 RPG. He played all 40 minutes of Providence's first-round effort against USC, recording 19 points and nine rebounds during the 70–69 win. The Friars then lost in the second round to eventual NCAA runner-up UNC, despite a 50-point combined effort from Bentil and Dunn. At the close of the season, Bentil was named first-team All-Big East and the conference's most improved player.

On March 23, 2016, Bentil declared for the NBA draft, forgoing his final two years of college eligibility.

== Professional career ==
=== Fort Wayne Mad Ants (2016) ===
On June 23, 2016, Bentil was selected by the Boston Celtics with the 51st overall pick in the 2016 NBA draft. He signed with the Celtics on July 27, 2016, but was waived on October 21 after appearing in three preseason games. Three days later, he was signed and waived by the Indiana Pacers. On October 31, he was acquired by the Fort Wayne Mad Ants of the NBA Development League as an affiliate player of the Pacers. After appearing in just a single D-League game for the Mad Ants, he left the team in mid-November in order to play in China.

=== Xinjiang Flying Tigers (2016) ===
On November 25, 2016, Bentil signed with the Xinjiang Flying Tigers of the Chinese Basketball Association as a short-term injury replacement for Andray Blatche. He made his debut for Xinjiang that night, scoring 28 points off the bench against the Jilin Northeast Tigers. He left Xinjiang in late December 2016 after appearing in 11 games.

=== Dallas Mavericks / Return to Fort Wayne (2017) ===
On January 16, 2017, Bentil returned to the Fort Wayne Mad Ants.

On February 26, 2017, Bentil signed a 10-day contract with the Dallas Mavericks. He made his NBA debut three days later in the Mavericks' 100–95 loss to the Atlanta Hawks; Bentil entered the game in the second quarter and failed to score in 4½ minutes of playing time, becoming the first player born in Ghana to play in the NBA. On March 8, 2017, after two more games with the Mavericks, the 10-day contract expired and returned to the Mad Ants.

=== Châlons-Reims (2017–2018) ===
Bentil was included in San Antonio Spurs roster for 2017 NBA Summer League. On August 28, 2017, Bentil signed a deal with the Champagne Châlons-Reims Basket out in France's LNB Pro A.

=== Bilbao (2018) ===
In February 2018, Bentil left Châlons-Reims and signed with Bilbao Basket in Spain for the remainder of the season.

=== Peristeri (2018–2019) ===
On September 25, 2018, Bentil signed with Peristeri in Greece. He averaged 12.5 points (49.7% in 2-point attempts and 37.9% from the 3-point line), 6.7 rebounds, 0.9 assists and 0.8 steals in 35 games in the Greek Basket League.

=== Panathinaikos (2019–2021) ===
On June 21, 2019, Bentil re-upped his contract with Peristeri for another season, NBA and EuroLeague opt-outs included. On July 17, 2019, the player used his EuroLeague opt-out and signed with Panathinaikos for the next two years, following his former coach, Argyris Pedoulakis. With the Greens, Bentil had 4.3 points and 4.5 rebounds in the Greek Basket League and in his very first season in the EuroLeague his stats were 3.1 points and 2.0 rebounds in 8.6 minutes per game. As a member of Panathinaikos, he won the Greek Championship.

After winning both the 2021 Greek championship and the 2021 Greek Cup, Bentil parted ways with Panathinaikos on June 18, 2021. He averaged 6 points and 2.6 rebounds per game in EuroLeague competition, as well as 8.1 points and 3.6 rebounds in the Greek Basket League.

=== Bahçeşehir Koleji (2021) ===
On July 7, 2021, Bentil signed with Bahçeşehir Koleji of the Turkish Basketbol Süper Ligi (BSL). Bentil averaged 12 points, 4.4 rebounds, and 2.3 assists per game.

=== Olimpia Milano (2021–2022) ===
On November 27, 2021, Bentil signed with Olimpia Milano of the Italian Lega Basket Serie A and the EuroLeague.

=== Crvena zvezda (2022–2023) ===
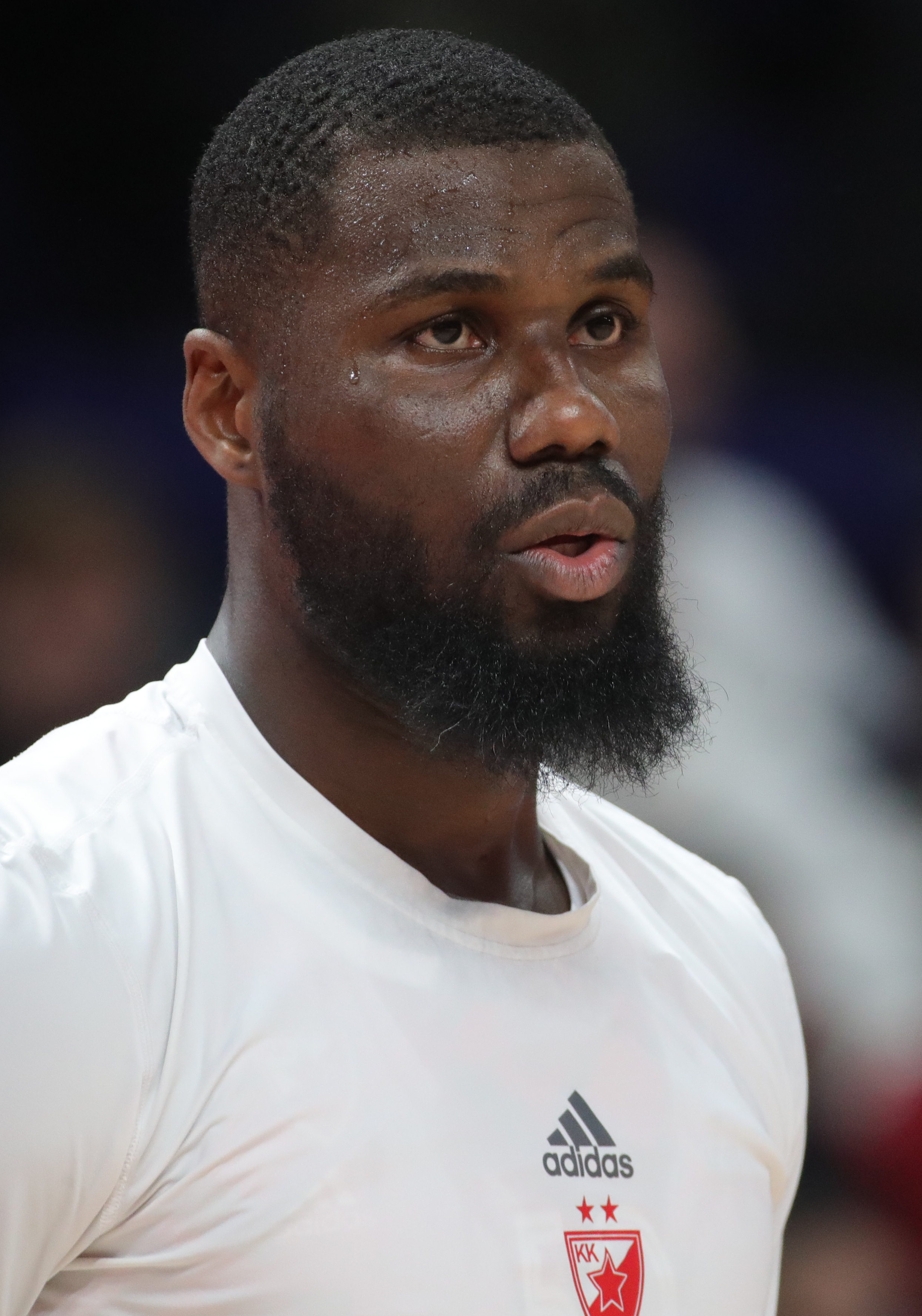
Bentil with Crvena zvezda in 2022

On July 20, 2022, Bentil signed with Crvena zvezda of the Adriatic League and the EuroLeague. On July 2, 2023, he parted ways with the Serbian club.

=== Gunma Crane Thunders (2023–2024) ===
On July 21, 2023, Bentil signed with Gunma Crane Thunders of the Japanese B.League.

=== Hapoel Tel Aviv (2024) ===
On July 1, 2024, he signed with Hapoel Tel Aviv of the Israeli Basketball Premier League.

On October 25, 2024, Bentil was released from his contract after two games with the team. He averaged 4.5 points, 1 rebound and 1 assist per game.

=== Gevi Napoli Basket (2024–2025) ===
On October 29, 2024, Bentil signed with Napoli Basket of the LBA.

=== LDLC ASVEL (2025) ===
On January 21, 2025, Bentil was announced as a new player for LDLC ASVEL of the LNB Élite, marking his return to the EuroLeague.

=== Mersin MSK (2025) ===
On July 19, 2025, he signed with Mersin MSK of the Basketbol Süper Ligi (BSL).

=== Formosa Dreamers (2026–present) ===
On January 6, 2026, Bentil signed with the Formosa Dreamers of the Taiwan Professional Basketball League (TPBL). On June 6, Bentil was awarded the Finals MVP in the 2026 TPBL finals. On July 2, Bentil re-signed with the Formosa Dreamers of the Taiwan Professional Basketball League (TPBL).

== NBA career statistics ==
Legend
GP	Games played	GS	Games started	MPG	Minutes per game
FG%	Field goal percentage	3P%	3-point field goal percentage	FT%	Free throw percentage
RPG	Rebounds per game	APG	Assists per game	SPG	Steals per game
BPG	Blocks per game	PPG	Points per game	**Bold**	Career high

=== Regular season ===
Year	Team	GP	GS	MPG	FG%	3P%	FT%	RPG	APG	SPG	BPG	PPG
2016–17	Dallas	3	0	3.3	.000	.000	.000	.7	.0	.0	.0	.0
Career		3	0	3.3	.000	.000	.000	.7	.0	.0	.0	.0
