= Randall Hanke =

American basketball player (born 1984)

eco Örebro Basket
- Position: Center
- League: Basketligan

Personal information
- Born: August 8, 1984 (age 41) New York City, New York, U.S.
- Listed height: 6 ft 11 in (2.11 m)
- Listed weight: 240 lb (109 kg)

Career information
- High school: Trinity-Pawling School
- College: Providence (2004–2009)
- Playing career: 2009–present

Career history
- 2009–2010: Glasgow Rocks
- 2010: CB 1939 Canarias
- 2010: USK Praha
- 2010–2013: Norrköping Dolphins
- 2013: Gießen 46ers
- 2014: KTP-Basket
- 2014–present: eco Örebro Basket

Randall Flagler Hanke (born August 8, 1984 in New York City) is an American-born British professional basketball player.

== Early life and college career ==
Hanke's godfather was the actor Cliff Robertson. Hanke tried to be a professional golfer while growing up but later focused his attention on basketball after a growth spurt. He attended The Hill School in Pottstown, Pennsylvania, but did not qualify for college immediately out of high school so he enrolled at Trinity-Pawling School for a postgraduate year. Hanke excelled at Providence College, where he averaged 13 points and 5 rebounds per game as a sophomore. He broke his hand twice and missed a season, which hampered his play even after he recovered. As a senior for the Friars, he averaged 9 points and 5 rebounds per game. In 2009, he graduated from Providence College with a degree in business management.

== Professional career ==
In 2010, he signed with the Glasgow Rocks of the British League and averaged 8.2 points and 3.7 rebounds per game. He left to play with CB 1939 Canarias of Spain, which he enjoyed since it fit his style of play. Later, he competed with USK Praha of the Czech league. Betweed 2010 to 2014, Hanke played for the Swedish team Norrköping Dolphins. In the 2012–2013 season he played fourteen games and averaged 3.6 points and 2.9 rebounds per game. He then moved to the Gießen 46ers of the German Pro A, but only competed in the preseason. Hanke played eight games for KTP-Basket of the Finnish Korisliiga where he averaged 6.9 points and 4.0 rebounds per game. In July 2014, he returned to Sweden and signed with eco Örebro Basket.

== International career ==
Hanke has competed for Great Britain in a warm-up tournament for the European Championship since his father was from London. However, he was cut from the final 12-man roster.
