= Karim Shabazz =

American basketball player

Personal information
- Born: November 2, 1978 (age 48) Queens, New York, U.S.
- Listed height: 7 ft 2 in (2.18 m)
- Listed weight: 229 lb (104 kg)

Career information
- High school: Lawrence Woodmere Academy (Woodmere, New York)
- College: Florida State (1997–1999); Providence (1999–2001)
- NBA draft: 2001: undrafted
- Playing career: 2001–2011
- Position: Center

Career history
- 2001: Unia Tarnów
- 2001–2002: Pallacanestro Varese
- 2002–2003: Orlandina Basket
- 2003: North Charleston Lowgators
- 2003–2004: Charleston Lowgators
- 2004–2007: Akropol BBK
- 2007–2008: Hebraica y Macabi
- 2009: Science City Jena
- 2011: BBC Etzella Ettelbruck

Career highlights
- NBA D-League Defensive Player of the Year (2004)

Karim Shabazz (born November 2, 1978) is an American former professional basketball player. He played at the center position.

Shabazz played college basketball at both Florida State University and Providence College. He went undrafted in 2001 NBA draft.

While playing for Charleston Lowgators he was named NBDL Defensive Player of the Year for the 2003–04 season.
