= Kris Dunn =

American basketball player (born 1994)

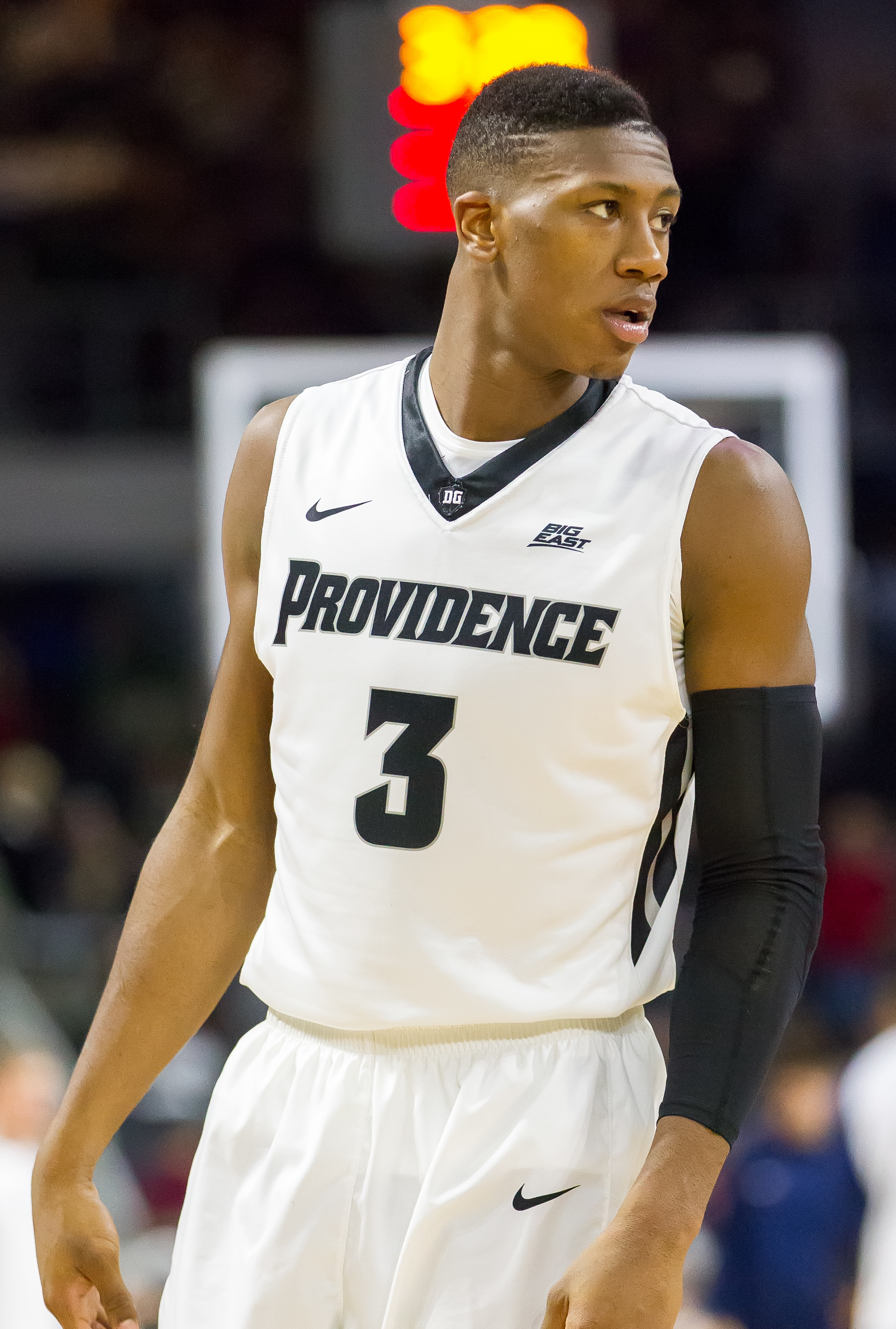
- Dunn with Providence in 2016

No. 8 – Los Angeles Clippers
- Position: Point guard / shooting guard
- League: NBA

Personal information
- Born: March 18, 1994 (age 32) New London, Connecticut, U.S.
- Listed height: 6 ft 3 in (1.91 m)
- Listed weight: 205 lb (93 kg)

Career information
- High school: New London (New London, Connecticut)
- College: Providence (2012–2016)
- NBA draft: 2016: 1st round, 5th overall pick
- Drafted by: Minnesota Timberwolves
- Playing career: 2016–present

Career history
- 2016–2017: Minnesota Timberwolves
- 2017–2020: Chicago Bulls
- 2020–2021: Atlanta Hawks
- 2022: Agua Caliente Clippers
- 2022: Portland Trail Blazers
- 2022–2023: Capital City Go-Go
- 2023–2024: Utah Jazz
- 2024–present: Los Angeles Clippers

Career highlights
- NBA G League All-Defensive Team (2023); Consensus second-team All-American (2016); 2× Big East Player of the Year (2015, 2016); 2× First-team All-Big East (2015, 2016); 2× Big East Defensive Player of the Year (2015, 2016); McDonald's All-American (2012); First-team Parade All-American (2012)
- Stats at NBA.com
- Stats at Basketball Reference

Kristofer Michael Dunn (born March 18, 1994) is an American professional basketball player for the Los Angeles Clippers of the National Basketball Association (NBA). He played four seasons of college basketball for the Providence Friars before being drafted with the fifth overall pick in the 2016 NBA draft by the Minnesota Timberwolves. He played his rookie season with the Timberwolves before being traded to the Chicago Bulls in 2017. Dunn signed with the Atlanta Hawks as a free agent in November 2020, but only played nine games for the team due to ankle surgery.

== High school career ==
Dunn attended New London High School in New London, Connecticut; he was one of the most dominating point guards in high school basketball. During his junior year in 2010–11, Dunn averaged 26.5 points, 10 rebounds, 5 steals and 5 assists per game to lead the Whalers to a 27–0 record and a victory in the Connecticut Class L State Championship against Northwest Catholic High School. In his senior year from 2011 to 2012, he scored his 2,000th career point. He also led New London High School to the semifinal round of the 2012 Connecticut Class LL State Championships where they were defeated by St. Josephs High School. Dunn was ranked #24 out of all high school players nationwide. He was also #1 in Connecticut.

Dunn announced his intention to attend Providence College in August 2011.

== College career ==
Dunn tore his labrum in June 2012 and underwent shoulder surgery immediately. He made his freshman debut in late December. He played 25 games that season and averaged 5.7 points per game.

On December 11, 2013, it was announced Dunn would undergo shoulder surgery and miss the rest of his sophomore season after playing four games.

In the 2014–15 season, Dunn returned from injury to earn the Big East Player of the Year and the Defensive Player of the Year awards. He averaged 15.6 points per game and led the Big East in assists per game and steals per game. Choosing to return for the 2015–16 season with the intention of graduating, Dunn garnered many preseason accolades, including preseason POY.

Dunn was named Big East Player of the Week on January 4, 2016, after scoring 26 points in a win against St. John's and a 26-point outing in a victory over ninth-ranked Butler. On February 1, 2016, he was named one of 10 finalists for the Bob Cousy Point Guard of the Year Award. He was named to the 35-man midseason watchlist for the Naismith Trophy on February 11.

At the conclusion of his redshirt junior season, Dunn announced his intention to skip his final season of eligibility and enter the 2016 NBA draft. Dunn graduated from Providence and received his college degree following the end of the season. According to ESPN, Dunn was listed as the number two point guard and would likely be a top-ten pick in the draft.

== Professional career ==
=== Minnesota Timberwolves (2016–2017) ===
On June 23, 2016, Dunn was selected by the Minnesota Timberwolves with the fifth overall pick in the 2016 NBA draft. On July 7, he signed his rookie-scale contract with the Timberwolves and joined the team for the 2016 NBA Summer League. Dunn scored a team-high 27 points in his Summer League debut. He managed just two Summer League games before sitting out the rest of the tournament after being diagnosed with a concussion. He made his regular season debut on October 26 in the Timberwolves' season opener, scoring eight points off the bench in a 102–98 loss to the Memphis Grizzlies. On November 1, he had 10 points, six assists and five steals in his first career start, helping the Timberwolves defeat the Grizzlies 116–80. On December 6, he had a season-best game with 15 points on 6-for-7 shooting in a 105–91 loss to the San Antonio Spurs.

=== Chicago Bulls (2017–2020) ===
On June 22, 2017, Dunn was traded, along with Zach LaVine and the rights to Lauri Markkanen (the 7th pick in the 2017 NBA draft), to the Chicago Bulls in exchange for Jimmy Butler and the rights to Justin Patton (the 16th pick in the 2017 NBA draft). His debut with the Bulls was delayed until the fifth game of the season after he suffered a left index finger dislocation during a preseason game on October 6. In his debut on October 28, in a 101–69 loss to the Oklahoma City Thunder, Dunn came off the bench and had eight points and five fouls, while also aggravating his finger. On November 17, 2017, he scored a career-high 22 points in a 123–120 win over the Charlotte Hornets. On December 9, 2017, he had 17 points, nine assists and seven rebounds and made two free throws with 2.9 seconds left to lift the Bulls to a 104–102 victory over the New York Knicks. On December 26, 2017, he recorded 20 points and 12 assists in 33 minutes in a 115–106 win over the Milwaukee Bucks. He also had four steals and two blocks against the Bucks; Dunn joined Michael Jordan as the only Bulls player with at least 20 points, 12 assists, four steals and two blocks in a game. He also became one of only 18 players to have amassed that stat line in an NBA game. On January 5, 2018, he scored a career-high 32 points in a 127–124 win over the Dallas Mavericks. On February 14, 2018, he had eight points and three assists in 20 minutes against the Toronto Raptors after missing 11 games because of a concussion.

Dunn missed the first two games of the 2018–19 season for the birth of his first child. After recording nine points and seven assists on October 22 against the Dallas Mavericks, Dunn was sidelined with a sprained MCL in his left knee. On December 10, after sitting out nearly seven weeks, Dunn returned to the lineup and finished with nine points in 20 minutes in a 108–89 loss to the Sacramento Kings. On December 15, he scored 24 points in a 98–93 win over the San Antonio Spurs. On January 4, he had 16 points and 17 assists in a 119–116 overtime loss to the Indiana Pacers. On March 20, he scored a season-high 26 points—including eight in overtime—to go with 13 assists in a 126–120 overtime win over the Washington Wizards.

In the 2019–20 season, Dunn finished eleventh in All-Defensive team voting. Although he narrowly missed out on both All-Defensive First and Second team, he received the only votes out of the players on a non playoff team or in the experimental "bubble" in Orlando. Dunn received four first team votes and twenty-three second team votes.

=== Atlanta Hawks (2020–2021) ===
On November 28, 2020, Dunn signed a two-year, $9.7 million contract with the Atlanta Hawks. He only played in four games for the Hawks during the 2020–21 season, missing 63 games due to leg injuries for which he required surgery.

On August 7, 2021, Dunn was traded to the Boston Celtics in a three-team trade involving the Sacramento Kings. He was then dealt to the Memphis Grizzlies on September 15, who waived him on October 16, after one preseason game.

=== Agua Caliente Clippers (2022) ===
On January 11, 2022, Dunn was acquired via waivers by the Agua Caliente Clippers.

=== Portland Trail Blazers (2022) ===
On March 14, 2022, Dunn signed a 10-day contract with the Portland Trail Blazers via the hardship exception. He made his debut for the team the same day, recording two points, five rebounds, three assists and two steals in a 113–122 loss to the Atlanta Hawks. On March 24, Dunn signed a second 10-day contract. On April 3, he signed a rest-of-season contract.

=== Capital City Go-Go (2022–2023) ===
On November 4, 2022, Dunn was named to the opening night roster for the Capital City Go-Go.

=== Utah Jazz (2023–2024) ===
On February 22, 2023, Dunn signed a 10-day contract with the Utah Jazz, reuniting with Bulls teammate Lauri Markkanen. On March 4, he signed a second 10-day contract with the Jazz. On March 14, Dunn signed a multi-year contract with the Jazz.

On March 24, 2024, Dunn was suspended two games after initiating an altercation and throwing a punch at Houston Rockets forward Jabari Smith Jr.

=== Los Angeles Clippers (2024–present) ===
On July 18, 2024, Dunn signed a three-year, $16.3 million contract with the Los Angeles Clippers via a sign-and-trade agreement in exchange for Russell Westbrook, the draft rights to Balša Koprivica, a second-round pick swap and cash considerations.

Dunn played in all 82 games (including 68 starts) for the Clippers during the 2025–26 season, recording averages of 7.3 points, 3.3 rebounds, and 3.6 assists.

== Personal life ==
On October 18, 2018, Dunn's girlfriend gave birth to a son.

== Career statistics ==
Legend
GP	Games played	GS	Games started	MPG	Minutes per game
FG%	Field goal percentage	3P%	3-point field goal percentage	FT%	Free throw percentage
RPG	Rebounds per game	APG	Assists per game	SPG	Steals per game
BPG	Blocks per game	PPG	Points per game	**Bold**	Career high
*	Led the league

=== NBA ===
==== Regular season ====
Year	Team	GP	GS	MPG	FG%	3P%	FT%	RPG	APG	SPG	BPG	PPG
2016–17	Minnesota	78	7	17.1	.377	.288	.610	2.1	2.4	1.0	**.5**	3.8
2017–18	Chicago	52	43	29.3	.429	.321	.737	4.3	**6.0**	**2.0**	**.5**	**13.4**
2018–19	Chicago	46	44	**30.2**	.425	.354	.797	4.1	**6.0**	1.5	**.5**	11.3
2019–20	Chicago	51	32	24.9	.444	.259	.741	3.6	3.4	**2.0**	.3	7.3
2020–21	Atlanta	4	0	11.4	.083	.000	.750	1.5	.5	.5	**.5**	1.3
2021–22	Portland	14	3	24.0	.431	.091	**.944**	3.5	5.6	1.6	.2	7.6
2022–23	Utah	22	3	25.8	**.537**	**.472**	.774	**4.5**	5.6	1.1	**.5**	13.2
2023–24	Utah	66	32	18.9	.470	.369	.688	2.9	3.8	1.0	.4	5.4
2024–25	L.A. Clippers	74	58	24.1	.439	.335	.682	3.4	2.8	1.7	.4	6.4
2025–26	L.A. Clippers	**82***	**68**	27.2	.476	.374	.765	3.3	3.6	1.6	.2	7.3
Career		489	290	24.0	.443	.337	.741	3.3	3.9	1.5	.4	7.6

==== Playoffs ====
Year	Team	GP	GS	MPG	FG%	3P%	FT%	RPG	APG	SPG	BPG	PPG
2021	Atlanta	5	0	6.6	.200	.000	**1.000**	1.0	1.0	.4	.4	1.2
2025	L.A. Clippers	**7**	**6**	**21.9**	**.386**	**.357**	–	**3.4**	**1.3**	**1.1**	**.6**	**6.3**
Career		12	6	15.5	.367	.345	1.000	2.4	1.2	.8	.5	4.2

=== College ===
Year	Team	GP	GS	MPG	FG%	3P%	FT%	RPG	APG	SPG	BPG	PPG
2012–13	Providence	25	18	27.2	.398	.286	.690	4.8	3.2	1.2	.3	5.7
2013–14	Providence	4	0	26.5	.316	.000	**1.000**	2.5	5.0	1.8	.3	3.8
2014–15	Providence	**33**	**33**	**34.0**	**.474**	.351	.686	**5.5**	**7.5**	**2.7**	.3	15.6
2015–16	Providence	**33**	32	33.0	.448	**.372**	.695	5.3	6.2	2.5	**.6**	**16.4**
Career		95	83	31.5	.450	.354	.693	5.1	5.8	2.2	.4	12.8
