= 2015 Big East men's basketball tournament =

- Classification: Division I
- Season: 2014–15
- Teams: 10
- Site: Madison Square Garden; New York City
- Champions: Villanova (2nd title)
- Winning coach: Jay Wright (1st title)
- MVP: Josh Hart (Villanova)
- Television: FS1

2014–15 Big East men's basketball standings
	Conf.				Overall
Team	W		L	PCT	W		L	PCT
No. 2 Villanova †	16	–	2	.889	33	–	3	.917
No. 22 Georgetown	12	–	6	.667	22	–	11	.667
No. 24 Butler	12	–	6	.667	23	–	11	.676
Providence	11	–	7	.611	22	–	12	.647
St. John's	10	–	8	.556	21	–	12	.636
Xavier	9	–	9	.500	23	–	14	.622
DePaul	6	–	12	.333	12	–	20	.375
Seton Hall	6	–	12	.333	16	–	15	.516
Marquette	4	–	14	.222	13	–	19	.406
Creighton	4	–	14	.222	14	–	19	.424
† 2015 Big East tournament winner As of April 6, 2015; Rankings from AP poll

The 2015 Big East men's basketball tournament, officially known as the 2015 Big East tournament, was a tournament played from March 11–14, at Madison Square Garden in New York City.

== Seeds ==
Seed	School	Conference	Overall	Tiebreaker
1	Villanova‡†	16–2	29–2	
2	Georgetown†	12–6	20–9	2–1 vs Butler (Note: Butler and Georgetown played three times during the regular season, as they met during the Battle 4 Atlantis. Per Big East tie breaking rules, all regular season games are considered when breaking ties.)
3	Butler†	12–6	22–9	1–2 vs. Georgetown
4	Providence†	11–7	21–10	
5	St. John's†	10–8	21–10	
6	Xavier†	9–9	19–12	
7	DePaul	6–12	12–19	2–0 vs. Seton Hall
8	Seton Hall	6–12	16–14	0–2 vs. DePaul
9	Marquette	4–14	13–18	1–1 vs. Providence
10	Creighton	4–14	12–18	0–2 vs. Providence
‡ – Big East regular season champions, and tournament No. 1 seed. † – Received a single-bye in the conference tournament. Overall records include all games played in the Big East tournament.

== Schedule ==
Game	Time*	Matchup^{#}	Television	Attendance
First round – Wednesday, March 11
1	7:00 pm	(8) Seton Hall vs. (9) Marquette	FS1	12,588
2	9:30 pm	(7) DePaul vs. (10) Creighton	FS1	12,588
Quarterfinals – Thursday, March 12
3	12:00 pm	(1) #4 Villanova vs. (9) Marquette	FS1	15,197
4	2:30 pm	(4) Providence vs. (5) St. John's	FS1	15,197
5	7:00 pm	(2) #23 Georgetown vs. (10) Creighton	FS1	13,245
6	9:30 pm	(3) #22 Butler vs. (6) Xavier	FS1	13,245
Semifinals – Friday, March 13
7	7:00 pm	(1) #4 Villanova vs. (4) Providence	FS1	15,194
8	9:45 pm	(2) #23 Georgetown vs. (6) Xavier	FS1	15,194
Championship – Saturday, March 14
9	8:00 pm	(1) #4 Villanova vs. (6) Xavier	FS1	13,471
*Game times in Eastern Time. Tournament seed in parentheses. #-Rankings denote Associated Press Poll ranking.

== Bracket ==
First round March 11
8	Seton Hall	56
9	Marquette	78
7	DePaul	63
10	Creighton	78

Quarterfinals; March 12
1	#4 Villanova	84
9	Marquette	49
4	Providence	74
5	St. John's	57
2	#23 Georgetown	60
10	Creighton	55
3	#22 Butler	61
6	Xavier	67*

Semifinals; March 13
1	#4 Villanova	63
4	Providence	61
2	#23 Georgetown	63
6	Xavier	65

Championship; March 14
1	#4 Villanova	69
6	Xavier	52

== All-Tournament team ==
- Dylan Ennis, Villanova
- Darrun Hilliard, Villanova
- Jalen Reynolds, Xavier
- D'Vauntes Smith-Rivera, Georgetown
- Kris Dunn, Providence

Dave Gavitt Trophy (Most Outstanding Player)

- Josh Hart, Villanova

== See also ==
- 2015 Big East women's basketball tournament
