= 2014–15 Seton Hall Pirates men's basketball team =

American college basketball season

2014–15 Seton Hall Pirates men's basketball

Paradise Jam tournament champions
- Conference: Big East Conference
- Record: 16–15 (6–12 Big East)
- Head coach: Kevin Willard
- Assistant coaches: Shaheen Holloway; Fred Hill; Dwayne Morton
- Home arena: Prudential Center; Walsh Gymnasium

2014–15 Big East men's basketball standings
	Conf.				Overall
Team	W		L	PCT	W		L	PCT
No. 2 Villanova †	16	–	2	.889	33	–	3	.917
No. 22 Georgetown	12	–	6	.667	22	–	11	.667
No. 24 Butler	12	–	6	.667	23	–	11	.676
Providence	11	–	7	.611	22	–	12	.647
St. John's	10	–	8	.556	21	–	12	.636
Xavier	9	–	9	.500	23	–	14	.622
DePaul	6	–	12	.333	12	–	20	.375
Seton Hall	6	–	12	.333	16	–	15	.516
Marquette	4	–	14	.222	13	–	19	.406
Creighton	4	–	14	.222	14	–	19	.424
† 2015 Big East tournament winner As of April 6, 2015; Rankings from AP poll

The 2014–15 Seton Hall Pirates men's basketball team represented Seton Hall University during the 2014–15 NCAA Division I men's basketball season. The Pirates, led by fifth year head coach Kevin Willard, played its home games in Newark, New Jersey at the Prudential Center and were members of the Big East Conference. They finished the season 16–15, 6–12 in Big East play to finish in a tie for seventh place. They lost in the first round of the Big East tournament to Marquette.

== Previous season ==
The Pirates finished the season 17–17, 6–12 in Big East play to finish in eighth place. They advanced to the semifinals of the Big East tournament where they lost to Providence.

== Departures ==
Name	Number	Pos.	Height	Weight	Year	Hometown	Notes
Tom Maayan	1	G	6'2"	175	Sophomore	Galilee, Israel	Left the team to join Israeli army
Hakeem Harris	15	G	6'1"	190	Junior	Bergenfield, NJ	Transferred
Gene Teague	21	C	6'9"	270	RS Senior	Vineland, NJ	Graduated
Brian Oliver	22	G/F	6'7"	225	RS Senior	Glassboro, NJ	Graduated
Fuquan Edwin	23	G/F	6'6"	215	Senior	Paterson, NJ	Graduated
Patrik Auda	33	F	6'9"	235	RS Junior	Brno, Czech Republic	Signed to play professionally in Poland
Aaron Geramipoor	50	C	6'11"	245	Senior	Manchester, England	Graduated

=== Incoming transfers ===
Name	Number	Pos.	Height	Weight	Year	Hometown	Previous School
Chier Ajou	42	C	7'2"	245	Junior	Aweil, South Sudan	Transferred from Northwestern. Under NCAA transfer rules, Ajou will have to redshirt for the 2014–15 season. Will have two years of remaining eligibility.

== Incoming recruits ==
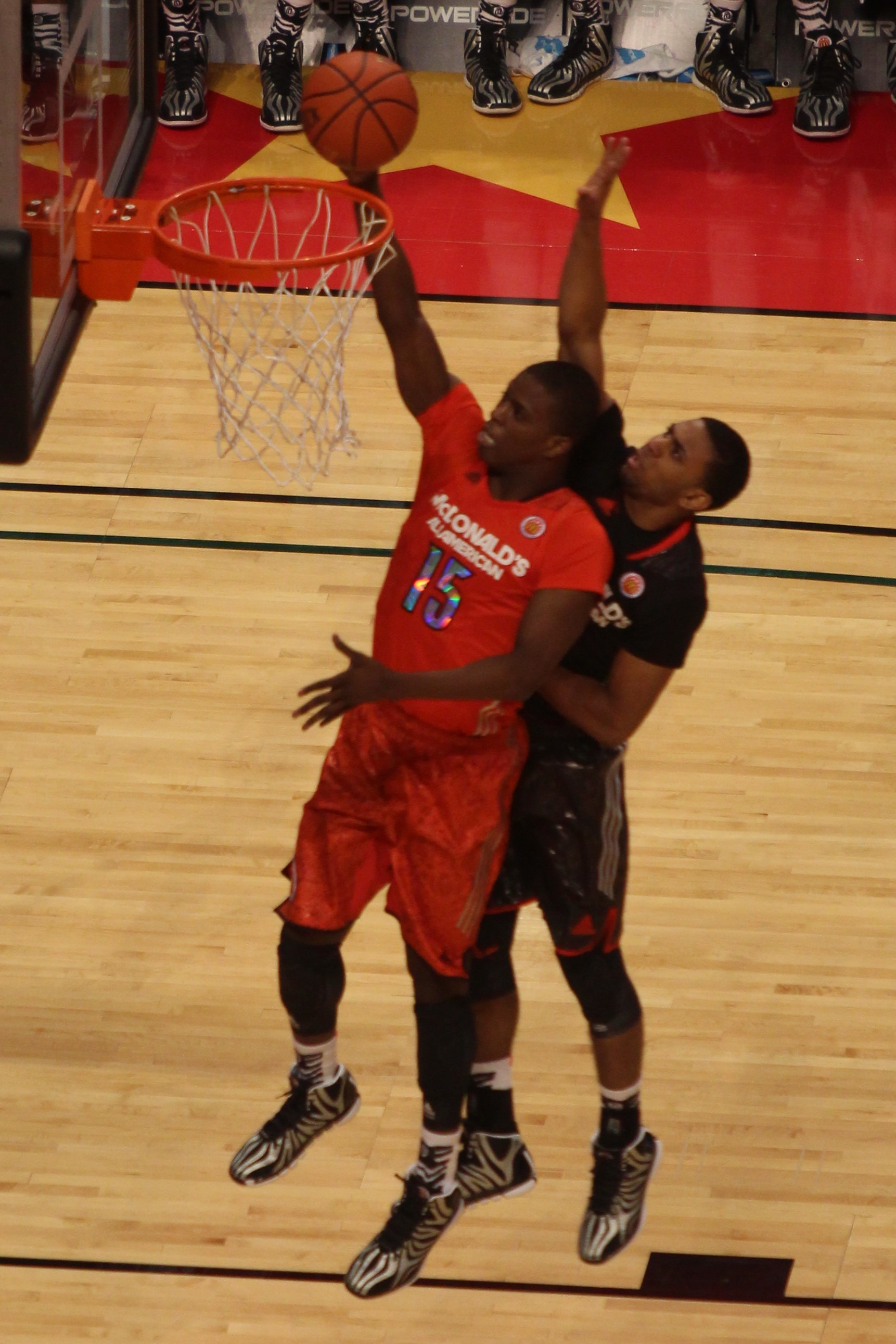
Isaiah Whitehead in front of Joel Berry II in the 2014 McDonald's All-American Boys Game

College recruiting
Name	Hometown	School	Height	Weight	Commit date
Isaiah Whitehead; SG	Brooklyn, NY	Lincoln High School	6 ft 4 in (1.93 m)	195 lb (88 kg)	Sep 19, 2013
Isaiah Whitehead; SG	Recruit ratings: Scout: Rivals: (95)				
Ángel Delgado; PF	Bronx, NY	The Patrick School	6 ft 8 in (2.03 m)	215 lb (98 kg)	Aug 16, 2013
Ángel Delgado; PF	Recruit ratings: Scout: Rivals: (87)				
Desi Rodriguez; SF	Bronx, NY	Lincoln High School	6 ft 5 in (1.96 m)	200 lb (91 kg)	Dec 23, 2013
Desi Rodriguez; SF	Recruit ratings: Scout: Rivals: (79)				
Khadeen Carrington; SG	Brooklyn, NY	Bishop Loughlin Memorial High School	6 ft 3 in (1.91 m)	185 lb (84 kg)	Sep 11, 2013
Khadeen Carrington; SG	Recruit ratings: Scout: Rivals: (75)				
Ismael Sanogo; SF	Newark, NJ	East Side High School	6 ft 6 in (1.98 m)	185 lb (84 kg)	Jul 16, 2013
Ismael Sanogo; SF	Recruit ratings: Scout: Rivals: (75)				
Mike Nzei; PF	Centereach, NY	Our Savior New American School	6 ft 7 in (2.01 m)	205 lb (93 kg)	May 19, 2013
Mike Nzei; PF	Recruit ratings: Scout: Rivals: (75)				
Overall recruit ranking:
Note: In many cases, Scout, Rivals, 247Sports, On3, and ESPN may conflict in their listings of height and weight.; In these cases, the average was taken. ESPN grades are on a 100-point scale.; Sources: "2014 Team Ranking". Rivals.

== Roster ==
2014–15 Seton Hall Pirates men's basketball team
Players
Coaches

Pos.	#	Name	Height	Weight	Year	Hometown
G	0	Khadeen Carrington	6 ft 3 in (1.91 m)	180 lb (82 kg)	Fr	Brooklyn, New York
F	1	Michael Nzei	6 ft 7 in (2.01 m)	190 lb (86 kg)	Fr	Makurdi, Nigeria
F	2	Brandon Mobley	6 ft 9 in (2.06 m)	225 lb (102 kg)	Sr	Savannah, Georgia
G	4	Sterling Gibbs	6 ft 2 in (1.88 m)	185 lb (84 kg)	RS Jr	Scotch Plains, New Jersey
F	13	Haralds Kārlis	6 ft 6 in (1.98 m)	210 lb (95 kg)	Sr	Riga, Latvia
G	14	Ismael Sanogo	6 ft 7 in (2.01 m)	190 lb (86 kg)	Fr	Newark, New Jersey
G	15	Isaiah Whitehead	6 ft 4 in (1.93 m)	210 lb (95 kg)	Fr	Brooklyn, New York
F	20	Desi Rodriguez	6 ft 6 in (1.98 m)	215 lb (98 kg)	Fr	Brooklyn, New York
G	22	Trevonn Morton	6 ft 1 in (1.85 m)	185 lb (84 kg)	Fr	Brooklyn, New York
F	25	Rashed Anthony	6 ft 9 in (2.06 m)	235 lb (107 kg)	RS Fr	Orangeburg, South Carolina
F	31	Ángel Delgado	6 ft 9 in (2.06 m)	225 lb (102 kg)	Fr	Bajos de Haina, Dominican Republic
C	42	Cheir Ajou (redshirt)	7 ft 1 in (2.16 m)	245 lb (111 kg)	Jr	Aweil, South Sudan
F	45	Stephane Manga	6 ft 6 in (1.98 m)	220 lb (100 kg)	Sr	Orléans, France

Head coach

- Kevin Willard (Pittsburgh)

Assistant coach(es)

- Shaheen Holloway (Seton Hall)
- Fred Hill (Montclair State)
- Dwayne Morton (LIU Brooklyn)

Legend

- (C) Team captain
- (S) Suspended
- (I) Ineligible
- (W) Walk-on
- Injured
- Current redshirt

Roster

== Schedule ==
Date time, TV	Rank^{#}	Opponent^{#}	Result	Record	Site (attendance) city, state
Non-conference regular season
11/16/2014*; 12:00 pm, FSN		Mercer	W 63–47	1–0	Prudential Center (7,075); Newark, NJ
11/21/2014*; 4:00 pm, CBSSN		vs. Nevada; Paradise Jam quarterfinals	W 68–60	2–0	Sports and Fitness Center (1,351); St. Thomas, VI
11/23/2014*; 6:00 pm, CBSSN		vs. Gardner–Webb; Paradise Jam semifinals	W 85–67	3–0	Sports and Fitness Center (2,005); St. Thomas, VI
11/24/2014*; 9:00 pm, CBSSN		vs. Illinois State; Paradise Jam finals	W 84–80	4–0	Sports and Fitness Center (2,955); St. Thomas, VI
11/29/2014*; 4:00 pm, FSN		George Washington	W 58–54	5–0	Prudential Center (7,774); Newark, NJ
12/02/2014*; 7:00 pm, FS2		Mount St. Mary's	W 78–55	6–0	Prudential Center (5,912); Newark, NJ
12/06/2014*; 12:00 pm, FSN		Rutgers; Rivalry	W 81–54	7–0	Prudential Center (8,710); Newark, NJ
12/09/2014*; 7:00 pm, ESPN2		at No. 11 Wichita State	L 68–77	7–1	Charles Koch Arena (10,056); Wichita, KS
12/14/2014*; 12:00 pm, FS1		Saint Peter's	W 67–52	8–1	Prudential Center (6,502); Newark, NJ
12/18/2014*; 7:00 pm, CBSSN		at South Florida	W 89–69	9–1	USF Sun Dome (3,330); Tampa, FL
12/21/2014*; 6:00 pm, ESPNU		at Georgia	L 47–65	9–2	Stegeman Coliseum (7,556); Athens, GA
12/27/2014*; 12:00 pm, FS1		vs. Maine	W 72–43	10–2	Walsh Gymnasium (1,833); South Orange, NJ
Big East Conference play
12/31/2014; 12:00 pm, FS1		No. 15 St. John's	W 78–67	11–2 (1–0)	Prudential Center (9,183); Newark, NJ
01/03/2015; 12:00 pm, FS1		No. 6 Villanova	W 66–61 ^{OT}	12–2 (2–0)	Prudential Center (10,701); Newark, NJ
01/07/2015; 7:00 pm, CBSSN	No. 19	at Xavier	L 58–69	12–3 (2–1)	Cintas Center (10,250); Cincinnati, OH
01/10/2015; 2:00 pm, FS1	No. 19	at Creighton	W 68–67	13–3 (3–1)	CenturyLink Center (17,397); Omaha, NE
01/13/2015; 7:00 pm, FS1	No. 21	Butler	L 75–79 ^{OT}	13–4 (3–2)	Prudential Center (7,574); Newark, NJ
01/22/2015; 7:00 pm, FS1	No. 24	DePaul	L 60–64	13–5 (3–3)	Prudential Center (7,743); Newark, NJ
01/25/2015; 3:00 pm, FSN	No. 24	at Butler	L 57–77	13–6 (3–4)	Hinkle Fieldhouse (8,823); Indianapolis, IN
01/28/2015; 7:00 pm, FS1		at Marquette	W 80–70	14–6 (4–4)	BMO Harris Bradley Center (14,917); Milwaukee, WI
01/31/2015; 12:00 pm, FS1		Xavier	W 90–82	15–6 (5–4)	Prudential Center (8,205); Newark, NJ
02/03/2015; 9:15 pm, FS1		at DePaul	L 62–75	15–7 (5–5)	Allstate Arena (5,431); Rosemont, IL
02/07/2015; 12:00 pm, CBSSN		Marquette	L 54–57	15–8 (5–6)	Prudential Center (8,566); Newark, NJ
02/10/2015; 7:00 pm, FS1		Georgetown	L 67–86	15–9 (5–7)	Prudential Center (8,357); Newark, NJ
02/14/2015; 4:00 pm, FSN		at Providence	L 62–69	15–10 (5–8)	Dunkin' Donuts Center (12,120); Providence, RI
02/16/2015; 7:00 pm, FS1		at No. 6 Villanova	L 54–80	15–11 (5–9)	The Pavilion (6,500); Villanova, PA
02/21/2015; 12:00 pm, FS1		at St. John's	L 72–85	15–12 (5–10)	Carnesecca Arena (5,602); Queens, NY
02/28/2015; 4:00 pm, CBSSN		Creighton	W 67–66	16–12 (6–10)	Prudential Center (8,507); Newark, NJ
03/04/2015; 7:00 pm, FS1		No. 24 Providence	L 66–79	16–13 (6–11)	Prudential Center (7,162); Newark, NJ
03/07/2015; 12:00 pm, FOX		at Georgetown	L 67–73	16–14 (6–12)	Verizon Center (14,392); Washington, D.C.
Big East tournament
03/11/2015; 7:00 pm, FS1		vs. Marquette; First round	L 56–78	16–15	Madison Square Garden (12,588); New York, NY
*Non-conference game. ^{#}Rankings from AP Poll. (#) Tournament seedings in parentheses. All times are in Eastern Time.

== Rankings ==
Legend: ██ Increase in ranking. ██ Decrease in ranking.
Poll	Pre	Wk 2	Wk 3	Wk 4	Wk 5	Wk 6	Wk 7	Wk 8	Wk 9	Wk 10	Wk 11	Wk 12	Wk 13	Wk 14	Wk 15	Wk 16	Wk 17	Wk 18	Final
AP	NR	NR	NR	RV	RV	RV	RV	NR	19	21	24	RV	RV	NR	NR	NR	NR	NR	N/A
Coaches	NR	NR	NR	NR	RV	RV	RV	RV	19	21	24	NR	RV	NR	NR	NR	NR	NR	NR
