= 2014–15 DePaul Blue Demons men's basketball team =

American college basketball season

2014–15 DePaul Blue Demons men's basketball
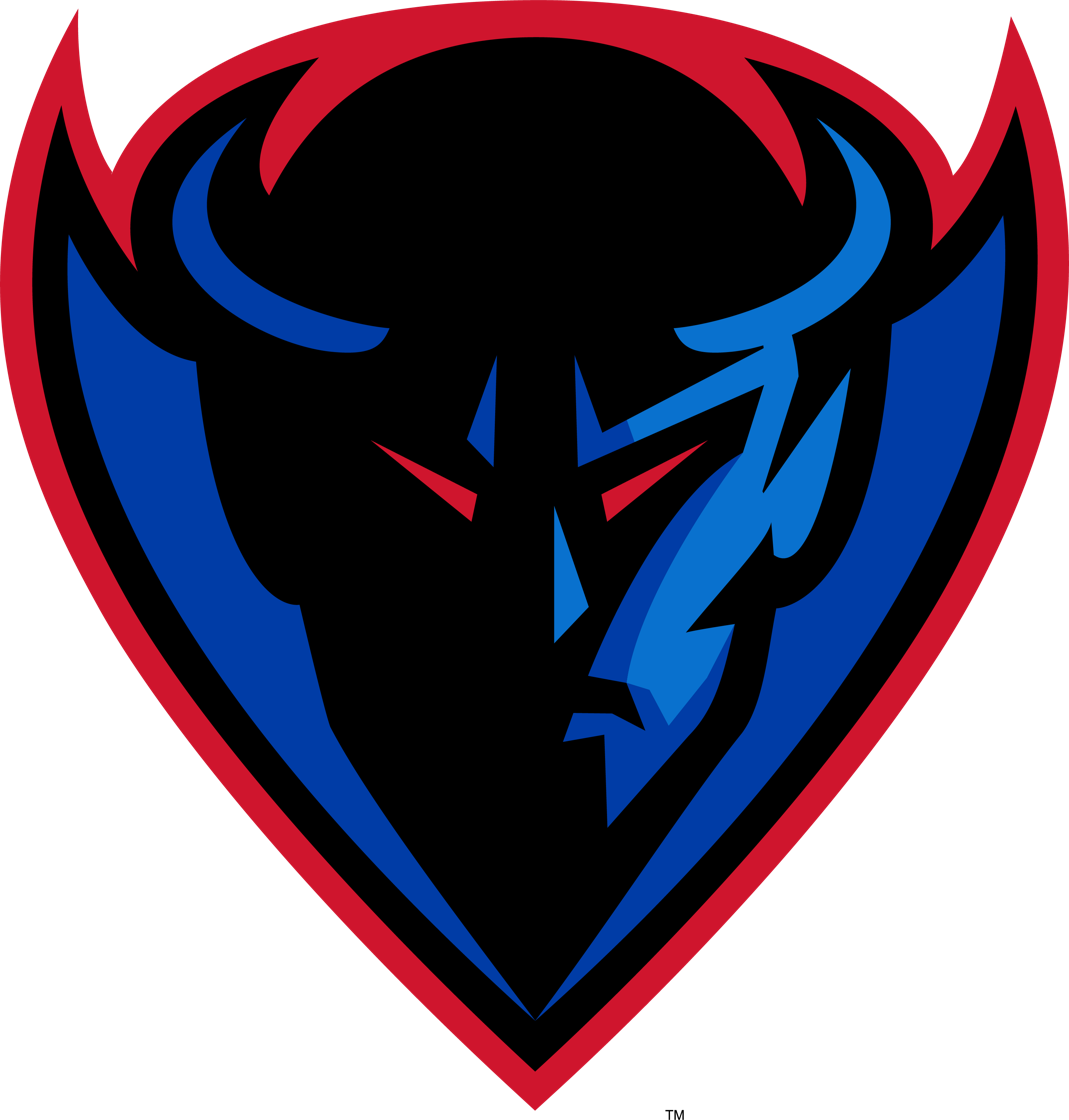
- Conference: Big East Conference
- Record: 12–20 (6–12 Big East)
- Head coach: Oliver Purnell (5th season)
- Assistant coaches: Ron Bradley; Billy Garrett; Renard Phillips
- Home arena: Allstate Arena; McGrath–Phillips Arena

2014–15 Big East men's basketball standings
	Conf.				Overall
Team	W		L	PCT	W		L	PCT
No. 2 Villanova †	16	–	2	.889	33	–	3	.917
No. 22 Georgetown	12	–	6	.667	22	–	11	.667
No. 24 Butler	12	–	6	.667	23	–	11	.676
Providence	11	–	7	.611	22	–	12	.647
St. John's	10	–	8	.556	21	–	12	.636
Xavier	9	–	9	.500	23	–	14	.622
DePaul	6	–	12	.333	12	–	20	.375
Seton Hall	6	–	12	.333	16	–	15	.516
Marquette	4	–	14	.222	13	–	19	.406
Creighton	4	–	14	.222	14	–	19	.424
† 2015 Big East tournament winner As of April 6, 2015; Rankings from AP poll

The 2014–15 DePaul Blue Demons men's basketball team represented DePaul University during the 2014–15 NCAA Division I men's basketball season. The Blue Demons, led by fifth year head coach Oliver Purnell, played their home games at the Allstate Arena, and were members of the Big East Conference. They finished the season 12–20, 6–12 in Big East play to finish in a tie for seventh place. They lost in the first round of the Big East tournament to Creighton.

On March 14, head coach Oliver Purnell resigned. He finished at DuPaul with a five year record of 54–105.

== Previous season ==
The Blue Demons finished the season 12–21, 3–15 in Big East play to finish in last place. They advanced to the quarterfinals of the Big East tournament where they lost to Creighton.

== Departures ==
Name	Number	Pos.	Height	Weight	Year	Hometown	Notes
DeJuan Marrero	1	F	6'5"	219	Freshman	Gary, IN	Transferred to Chipola College
Edwind McGhee	4	G	6'3"	205	Senior	Champaign, IL	Graduated
Cleveland Melvin	12	F	6'8"	208	Senior	Baltimore, MD	Graduated
Brandon Young	20	G	6'4"	192	Senior	Baltimore, MD	Graduated
Charles McKinney	32	G	6'3"	183	Junior	Evanston, IL	Dismissed from the team
Sandi Marcius	55	F	6'10"	255	Senior	Nedelišće, Croatia	Graduated

=== Incoming transfers ===
Name	Number	Pos.	Height	Weight	Year	Hometown	Previous School
Darrick Wood	1	G	6'5"	175	Junior	Washington, D.C.	Junior college transfer from Hutchinson Community College.
Rashaun Stimage	3	G	6'7"	220	Junior	Chicago, IL	Junior college transfer from Daytona State College.
Aaron Simpson	15	G	5'11"	175	Junior	North Chicago, IL	Junior college transfer from Lincoln College.

== Incoming recruits ==
College recruiting
Name	Hometown	School	Height	Weight	Commit date
			N/A	N/A	
Recruit ratings: (7)
Overall recruit ranking:
Note: In many cases, Scout, Rivals, 247Sports, On3, and ESPN may conflict in their listings of height and weight.; In these cases, the average was taken. ESPN grades are on a 100-point scale.; Sources: "2014 Team Ranking". Rivals.

== Roster ==
2014–15 DePaul Blue Demons men's basketball team
Players
Coaches

Pos.	#	Name	Height	Weight	Year	Previous school	Hometown
G	0	R. J. Curington	6 ft 5 in (1.96 m)	209 lb (95 kg)	So	Oak Hill Academy	Dyer, IN
G	1	Darrick Wood	6 ft 5 in (1.96 m)	190 lb (86 kg)	So	Bridgton Academy; Hutchinson CC	Alexandria, VA
C	2	Tommy Hamilton IV	6 ft 11 in (2.11 m)	281 lb (127 kg)	So	IMG Academy	Chicago, IL
F	3	Rashaun Stimage	6 ft 8 in (2.03 m)	217 lb (98 kg)	Jr	Farragut; Daytona State College	Chicago, IL
F	4	Myke Henry	6 ft 6 in (1.98 m)	226 lb (103 kg)	RS Jr	Orr; Illinois	Chicago, IL
G	5	Billy Garrett Jr.	6 ft 6 in (1.98 m)	205 lb (93 kg)	So	Morgan Park	Chicago, IL
F	11	Forrest Robinson	6 ft 10 in (2.08 m)	223 lb (101 kg)	Sr	Eastland; South Plains College	Ranger, TX
G	13	Cory Dolins	6 ft 0 in (1.83 m)	182 lb (83 kg)	Jr	Niles West	Northbrook, IL
G	15	Aaron Simpson	5 ft 11 in (1.8 m)	152 lb (69 kg)	Jr	North Chicago; Lincoln College	North Chicago, IL
F	21	Jamee Crockett	6 ft 4 in (1.93 m)	202 lb (92 kg)	Sr	Crete-Monee	Chicago, IL
G	25	Durrell McDonald	6 ft 2 in (1.88 m)	173 lb (78 kg)	Jr	Green Valley	Las Vegas, NV
F	30	Peter Ryckbosch (injured) (redshirt)	6 ft 10 in (2.08 m)	241 lb (109 kg)	Jr	St. Ignatius	Chicago, IL
F	42	Greg Sequele	6 ft 9 in (2.06 m)	215 lb (98 kg)	Sr	Ribet Academy; Citrus College	Sainte-Rose, Guadeloupe

Head coach

- Oliver Purnell (Old Dominion)

Assistant coach(es)

- Ron Bradley (Bridgewater State)
- Billy Garrett (Indianapolis)
- Renard Phillips (VMI)

Legend

- (C) Team captain
- (S) Suspended
- (I) Ineligible
- (W) Walk-on
- Injured
- Current redshirt

Roster
Last update: November 2014

== Schedule ==
Date time, TV	Opponent	Result	Record	Site (attendance) city, state
Exhibition
11/6/2014*; 8:00 pm	Lewis	W 72–68	–	McGrath–Phillips Arena (N/A); Chicago, IL
Non-conference regular season
11/14/2014*; 9:00 pm, FS2	UIC	W 72–71	1–0	McGrath–Phillips Arena (3,501); Chicago, IL
11/18/2014*; 8:00 pm, FS1	Drake	W 80–62	2–0	Allstate Arena (5,340); Rosemont, IL
11/26/2014*; 8:00 pm, FS1	Lehigh	L 74–86	2–1	Allstate Arena (5,785); Rosemont, IL
11/30/2014*; 1:30 pm, FS1	Stanford	W 87–72	3–1	Allstate Arena (5,990); Rosemont, IL
12/02/2014*; 8:00 pm, FS1	Northern Illinois	W 78–67	4–1	Allstate Arena (5,457); Rosemont, IL
12/04/2014*; 7:00 pm	at Chicago State	W 84–60	5–1	Emil and Patricia Jones Convocation Center (754); Chicago, IL
12/07/2014*; 1:00 pm, FS1	Milwaukee	W 83–61	6–1	Allstate Arena (6,149); Rosemont, IL
12/11/2014*; 6:00 pm, CSN	at George Washington	L 68–81	6–2	Charles E. Smith Center (2,712); Washington, D.C.
12/14/2014*; 3:00 pm, FS1	Illinois State	L 72–78	6–3	Allstate Arena (6,323); Rosemont, IL
12/18/2014*; 9:00 pm, P12N	at Oregon State	L 59–90	6–4	Gill Coliseum (3,906); Corvallis, OR
12/22/2014*; 3:30 pm, ESPNU	vs. Colorado; Diamond Head Classic Quarterfinals	L 68–82	6–5	Stan Sheriff Center (8,297); Honolulu, HI
12/23/2014*; 1:30 pm, ESPNU	vs. Ohio; Diamond Head Classic 2nd round Consolation	L 78–99	6–6	Stan Sheriff Center (7,875); Honolulu, HI
12/25/2014*; 12:30 pm, ESPN3	vs. Loyola Marymount; Diamond Head Classic 7th place game	L 69–72	6–7	Stan Sheriff Center (5,125); Honolulu, HI
Big East Conference play
12/31/2014; 4:00 pm, FS1	Marquette	W 61–58	7–7 (1–0)	Allstate Arena (8,079); Rosemont, IL
01/03/2015; 1:00 pm, FS1	Xavier	W 71–68	8–7 (2–0)	Allstate Arena (6,827); Rosemont, IL
01/07/2015; 8:00 pm, FS1	at Creighton	W 70–60	9–7 (3–0)	CenturyLink Center (16,126); Omaha, NE
01/10/2015; 3:00 pm, CBSSN	at No. 8 Villanova	L 64–81	9–8 (3–1)	The Pavilion (6,500); Villanova, VA
01/13/2015; 8:15 pm, FS2/FS1 (Note: The broadcast began on Fox Sports 2 and moved to Fox Sports 1 while the game was in progress.)	Georgetown	L 72–78	9–9 (3–2)	Allstate Arena (6,263); Rosemont, IL
01/18/2015; 1:30 pm, FS1	St. John's	W 71–67	10–9 (4–2)	Allstate Arena (6,243); Rosemont, IL
01/22/2015; 6:00 pm, FS1	at No. 24 Seton Hall	W 64–60	11–9 (5–2)	Prudential Center (7,743); Newark, NJ
01/24/2015; 11:00 am, FS1	at Xavier	L 76–89	11–10 (5–3)	Cintas Center (10,250); Cincinnati, OH
01/27/2015; 8:00 pm, FS1	at Providence			Dunkin Donuts Center (–); Providence, RI
01/29/2015; 1:00 pm, FS1	at Providence	L 72–83	11–11 (5–4)	Dunkin Donuts Center (3,568); Providence, RI
01/31/2015; 1:00 pm, FS1	No. 7 Villanova	L 55–68	11–12 (5–5)	Allstate Arena (7,532); Rosemont, IL
02/03/2015; 8:15 pm, FS1	Seton Hall	W 75–62	12–12 (6–5)	Allstate Arena (5,431); Rosemont, IL
02/07/2015; 2:30 pm, FS1	at No. 22 Butler	L 73–83	12–13 (6–6)	Hinkle Fieldhouse (9,100); Indianapolis, IN
02/11/2015; 8:00 pm, CBSSN	at St. John's	L 78–86	12–14 (6–7)	Carnesecca Arena (5,040); Queens, NY
02/18/2015; 8:00 pm, CBSSN	Providence	L 57–84	12–15 (6–8)	Allstate Arena (5,923); Rosemont, IL
02/21/2015; 7:10 pm, CBSSN	at Georgetown	L 63–68	12–16 (6–9)	Verizon Center (7,984); Washington, D.C.
02/24/2015; 8:15 pm, FS1	Creighton	L 62–75	12–17 (6–10)	Allstate Arena (6,157); Rosemont, IL
02/28/2015; 1:00 pm, FS2	No. 23 Butler	L 53–67	12–18 (6–11)	Allstate Arena (8,805); Rosemont, IL
03/07/2015; 1:00 pm, FS1	at Marquette	L 48–58	12–19 (6–12)	BMO Harris Bradley Center (15,923); Milwaukee, WI
Big East tournament
03/11/2015; 8:30 p.m., FS1	vs. Creighton; First Round	L 63–78	12–20	Madison Square Garden (12,588); New York, NY
*Non-conference game. ^{#}Rankings from AP Poll. (#) Tournament seedings in parentheses. All times are in Central Time.
