= 2014–15 St. John's Red Storm men's basketball team =

American college basketball season

2014–15 St. John's Red Storm men's basketball

NCAA tournament, round of 64
- Conference: Big East Conference
- Record: 21–12 (10–8 Big East)
- Head coach: Steve Lavin (5th year)
- Assistant coaches: Jim Whitesell; Tony Chiles; Rico Hines
- Home arena: Carnesecca Arena; Madison Square Garden

2014–15 Big East men's basketball standings
	Conf.				Overall
Team	W		L	PCT	W		L	PCT
No. 2 Villanova †	16	–	2	.889	33	–	3	.917
No. 22 Georgetown	12	–	6	.667	22	–	11	.667
No. 24 Butler	12	–	6	.667	23	–	11	.676
Providence	11	–	7	.611	22	–	12	.647
St. John's	10	–	8	.556	21	–	12	.636
Xavier	9	–	9	.500	23	–	14	.622
DePaul	6	–	12	.333	12	–	20	.375
Seton Hall	6	–	12	.333	16	–	15	.516
Marquette	4	–	14	.222	13	–	19	.406
Creighton	4	–	14	.222	14	–	19	.424
† 2015 Big East tournament winner As of April 6, 2015; Rankings from AP poll

The 2014–15 St. John's Red Storm men's basketball team represented St. John's University during the 2014–15 NCAA Division I men's basketball season. The team was coached by Steve Lavin in his fifth year at the school. St. John's home games were played at Carnesecca Arena and Madison Square Garden and the team was members of the Big East Conference. They finished the season 21–12, 10–8 in Big East play to finish in fifth place. They lost in the quarterfinals of the Big East tournament to Providence. They received an at-large bid to the NCAA tournament where they lost in the first round to San Diego State. On March 27, 2015 St. John's and head coach Steve Lavin mutually agreed to part ways.

== Previous season ==
The Red Storm finished the season 20–13, 10–8 in Big East play to finish in three-way tie for third place. They lost in the quarterfinals of the Big East tournament to Providence. They were invited to the National Invitation Tournament, where they lost to Robert Morris in the first round.

=== Departures ===
Name	Number	Pos.	Height	Weight	Year	Hometown	Notes
Marc-Antoine Bourgault	2	G/F	6'6"	216	Senior	Saint-Malo, France	Graduated
God'sgift Achiuwa	3	F/C	6'8"	236	RS Senior	Port Harcourt, Nigeria	Graduated
Max Hooper	10	G/F	6'6"	202	RS Sophomore	Carmel Valley, California	Graduated; Transferred to Oakland
JaKarr Sampson	14	F	6'8"	208	Sophomore	Akron, Ohio	Entered 2014 NBA draft
Orlando Sánchez	33	F	6'9"	216	Senior	Nagua, Dominican Republic	Graduated

=== Class of 2014 signees ===
College recruiting information
Name	Hometown	School	Height	Weight	Commit date
Adonis De La Rosa; C	Bronx, NY	Christ the King High School	7 ft 0 in (2.13 m)	322 lb (146 kg)	Apr 9, 2014
Adonis De La Rosa; C	Recruit ratings: Scout: Rivals: (70)				
Amar Alibegovic; PF	Rome, Italy	Istituto Tecnico Minerva	6 ft 9 in (2.06 m)	230 lb (100 kg)	
Amar Alibegovic; PF	Recruit ratings: (NR)				
Overall recruit ranking:
Note: In many cases, Scout, Rivals, 247Sports, On3, and ESPN may conflict in their listings of height and weight.; In these cases, the average was taken. ESPN grades are on a 100-point scale.; Sources: "2014 Team Ranking". Rivals.

=== Transfer additions ===
Name	Pos.	Height	Weight	Year	Hometown	Notes
Joey De La Rosa	C	6'11"	240	Senior	Bronx, New York	mid-season transfer from Florida International (0.5 yr eligibility remaining). Under NCAA transfer rules, he would be forced to sit out the fall semester of the 2014-15 season.
Keith Thomas	F	6'8"	221	Junior	Mount Vernon, New York	junior college transfer from Westchester Community College (2 yrs immediate eligibility). Did not met the necessary NCAA transfer requirements and was ruled ineligible for the 2014-15 season.

== Roster ==
2014–15 St. John's Red Storm men's basketball team
Players
Coaches

Pos.	#	Name	Height	Weight	Year	Previous school	Hometown
G	0	Jamal Branch	6 ft 3 in (1.91 m)	169 lb (77 kg)	Sr	Grace Prep/Texas A&M	Kansas City, MO
G	1	Phil Greene	6 ft 2 in (1.88 m)	187 lb (85 kg)	Sr	IMG Academy	Chicago, IL
G	2	Myles Stewart (W)	6 ft 5 in (1.96 m)	180 lb (82 kg)	Fr	Westchester	Los Angeles, CA
F	4	Christian Jones	6 ft 7 in (2.01 m)	230 lb (104 kg)	RS So	IMG Academy	Arlington, TX
G	5	David Lipscomb (W)	6 ft 2 in (1.88 m)	180 lb (82 kg)	RS So	Wheeler	Riverdale, GA
G	10	Felix Balamou	6 ft 4 in (1.93 m)	192 lb (87 kg)	Jr	Our Savior New American	Conakry, Guinea
G	11	D'Angelo Harrison	6 ft 4 in (1.93 m)	202 lb (92 kg)	Sr	Dulles	Missouri City, TX
F/C	12	Chris Obekpa	6 ft 10 in (2.08 m)	236 lb (107 kg)	Jr	Our Savior New American	Makurdi, Nigeria
F	14	Amar Alibegović	6 ft 9 in (2.06 m)	230 lb (104 kg)	Fr	Istituto Tecnico Minerva	Rome, Italy
G/F	15	Sir'Dominic Pointer	6 ft 5 in (1.96 m)	192 lb (87 kg)	Sr	Quality Education Academy	Detroit, MI
G	22	Jay Henderson (W)	6 ft 5 in (1.96 m)	180 lb (82 kg)	Fr	Lake Highland Prep	Orlando, FL
G	23	Rysheed Jordan	6 ft 4 in (1.93 m)	193 lb (88 kg)	So	Roberts Vaux	Philadelphia, PA
C	31	Adonis Delarosa (I)	7 ft 0 in (2.13 m)	322 lb (146 kg)	Fr	Christ the King	Bronx, NY
C	34	Joey Delarosa	6 ft 11 in (2.11 m)	249 lb (113 kg)	Sr	Montverde Academy/FIU	Bronx, NY
F	35	Khadim Ndiaye	6 ft 6 in (1.98 m)	195 lb (88 kg)	Sr	Christ the King	Queens, NY

Head coach

- Steve Lavin (Chapman)

Assistant coach(es)

- Jim Whitesell
- Rico Hines
- Tony Chiles
- Gene Keady (special asst.)

Legend

- (C) Team captain
- (S) Suspended
- (I) Ineligible
- (W) Walk-on
- Injured
- Current redshirt

Roster

== Schedule ==
Date time, TV	Rank^{#}	Opponent^{#}	Result	Record	High points	High rebounds	High assists	Site (attendance) city, state
Exhibition
11/01/2014*; 2:00 pm, ESPN3		Humboldt State	W 95–83		28 – Harrison	10 – Obekpa	5 – Branch	Carnesecca Arena (3,338); Queens, NY
11/08/2014*; 2:00 pm, ESPN3		St. Thomas Aquinas	W 97–71		21 – Greene IV	10 – Harrison	4 – Greene IV	Carnesecca Arena (3,490); Queens, NY
Non-conference regular season
11/14/2014*; 7:00 pm, FSN		NJIT	W 77–58	1–0	18 – Jordan	13 – Obekpa	5 – Jordan	Carnesecca Arena (4,703); Queens, NY
11/17/2014*; 7:30 pm, ESPN3		Franklin Pierce; NIT Season Tip-Off opening round	W 94–81	2–0	31 – Harrison	17 – Harrison	6 – Tied	Carnesecca Arena (3,553); Queens, NY
11/19/2014*; 7:30 pm, ESPN3		LIU Brooklyn; NIT Season Tip-Off opening round	W 66–53	3–0	18 – Pointer	10 – Obekpa	2 – 3 Tied	Carnesecca Arena (3,733); Queens, NY
11/26/2014*; 7:00 pm, ESPNU		vs. Minnesota; NIT Season Tip-Off semifinals	W 70–61	4–0	19 – Harrison	11 – Pointer	3 – Tied	Madison Square Garden (5,128); New York, NY
11/28/2014*; 7:00 pm, ESPN2		vs. No. 10 Gonzaga; NIT Season Tip-Off championship	L 66–73	4–1	20 – Greene IV	9 – Pointer	5 – Pointer	Madison Square Garden (5,548); New York, NY
12/02/2014*; 7:00 pm, FS1		Niagara	W 70–57	5–1	16 – Harrison	9 – Tied	6 – Branch	Carnesecca Arena (4,475); Queens, NY
12/06/2014*; 5:15 pm, ESPN2		at Syracuse	W 69–57	6–1	24 – Harrison	16 – Obekpa	5 – Pointer	Carrier Dome (24,884); Syracuse, NY
12/10/2014*; 8:00 pm, CBSSN	No. 24	Fairleigh Dickinson	W 74–52	7–1	26 – Harrison	12 – Obekpa	5 – Jordan	Carnesecca Arena (4,528); Queens, NY
12/14/2014*; 1:30 pm, FSN	No. 24	vs. Fordham; Madison Square Garden Holiday Festival	W 74–53	8–1	24 – Jordan	6 – Jones	7 – Branch	Madison Square Garden (8,074); New York, NY
12/19/2014*; 7:00 pm, FS1	No. 20	Saint Mary's	W 53–47	9–1	21 – Harrison	11 – Pointer	5 – Pointer	Carnesecca Arena (4,645); Queens, NY
12/22/2014*; 7:30 pm, CBSSN	No. 17	Long Beach State	W 66–49	10–1	16 – Tied	10 – Harrison	7 – Pointer	Carnesecca Arena (5,014); Queens, NY
12/28/2014*; 12:00 pm, FS1	No. 17	vs. Tulane; Brooklyn Hoops Winter Festival	W 82–57	11–1	24 – Pointer	8 – Obekpa	4 – Pointer	Barclays Center (6,032); Brooklyn, NY
12/31/2014; 12:00 pm, FS1	No. 15	at Seton Hall	L 67–78	11–2 (0–1)	25 – Harrison	7 – Tied	4 – Branch	Prudential Center (9,183); Newark, NJ
01/03/2015; 4:00 pm, CBSSN	No. 15	Butler	L 69–73	11–3 (0–2)	31 – Harrison	8 – Pointer	4 – Pointer	Carnesecca Arena (5,602); Queens, NY
01/06/2015; 9:00 pm, FS1	No. 24	No. 8 Villanova	L 72–90	11–4 (0–3)	25 – Harrison	5 – Obekpa	3 – Branch	Madison Square Garden (8,565); New York, NY
01/14/2015; 7:00 pm, FS1		at Providence	W 83–70	12–4 (1–3)	20 – Tied	8 – Pointer	4 – Harrison	Dunkin' Donuts Center (8,176); Providence, RI
01/18/2015; 2:30 pm, FS1		at DePaul	L 67–71	12–5 (1–4)	17 – Tied	5 – 3 Tied	4 – Jordan	Allstate Arena (6,243); Rosemont, IL
01/21/2015; 7:00 pm, FS1		Marquette	W 60–57	13–5 (2–4)	15 – Tied	12 – Pointer	6 – Pointer	Madison Square Garden (7,532); New York, NY
01/25/2015*; 2:00 pm, FOX		No. 5 Duke	L 68–77	13–6	21 – Pointer	10 – Pointer	4 – Pointer	Madison Square Garden (19,812); New York, NY
01/28/2015; 9:00 pm, FS1		at Creighton	L 74–77	13–7 (2–5)	18 – Harrison	10 – Pointer	6 – Pointer	CenturyLink Center (16,544); Omaha, NE
01/31/2015; 12:00 pm, FOX		Providence	W 75–66	14–7 (3–5)	20 – Pointer	10 – Obekpa	5 – Pointer	Madison Square Garden (8,973); New York, NY
02/03/2015; 7:00 pm, FS1		at No. 22 Butler	L 62–85	14–8 (3–6)	19 – Pointer	6 – Pointer	4 – Jordan	Hinkle Fieldhouse (7,132); Indianapolis, IN
02/07/2015; 12:00 pm, FSN		Creighton	W 84–66	15–8 (4–6)	25 – Jordan	10 – Harrison	6 – Harrison	Madison Square Garden (10,759); New York, NY
02/11/2015; 9:00 pm, CBSSN		DePaul	W 86–78	16–8 (5–6)	33 – Harrison	11 – Pointer	4 – Tied	Carnesecca Arena (5,040); Queens, NY
02/14/2015; 12:30 pm, FOX		at Xavier	W 78–70	17–8 (6–6)	24 – Pointer	5 – 4 Tied	3 – Harrison	Cintas Center (10,250); Cincinnati, OH
02/17/2015; 7:00 pm, FS1		at Georgetown	L 57–79	17–9 (6–7)	18 – Greene IV	8 – Pointer	5 – Branch	Verizon Center (8,685); Washington, D.C.
02/21/2015; 12:00 pm, FOX		Seton Hall	W 85–72	18–9 (7–7)	22 – Pointer	10 – Pointer	6 – Jordan	Carnesecca Arena (5,602); Queens, NY
02/23/2015; 8:00 pm, FS1		Xavier	W 58–57	19–9 (8–7)	20 – Harrison	9 – Pointer	6 – Jordan	Madison Square Garden (6,634); New York, NY
02/28/2015; 12:00 noon, CBS		Georgetown	W 81–70	20–9 (9–7)	26 – Pointer	7 – Tied	3 – Tied	Madison Square Garden (13,615); New York, NY
03/04/2015; 9:15 pm, FS1		at Marquette	W 67–51	21–9 (10–7)	23 – Jordan	13 – Pointer	7 – Pointer	BMO Harris Bradley Center (14,201); Milwaukee, WI
03/07/2015; 12:00 p.m., FOX		at No. 4 Villanova	L 68–105	21–10 (10–8)	21 – Jordan	4 – Tied	8 – Jordan	Wells Fargo Center (19,161); Philadelphia, PA
Big East tournament
03/12/2015; 2:30 pm, FS1		vs. Providence; Quarterfinals	L 57–74	21–11	18 – Jordan	9 – Obekpa	2 – Branch	Madison Square Garden (15,197); New York, NY
NCAA tournament
03/20/2015*; 9:40 pm, CBS	(9 S)	vs. (8 S) San Diego State; First round	L 64–76	21–12	21 – Pointer	10 – Pointer	2 – Tied	Time Warner Cable Arena (16,945); Charlotte, NC
*Non-conference game. ^{#}Rankings from AP Poll. (#) Tournament seedings in parentheses. All times are in Eastern Time. (#) during NCAA Tournament is seed with Region S=South.

== Rankings ==
Ranking movement Legend: ██ Improvement in ranking. ██ Decrease in ranking. RV=Received votes. NR=Not ranked.
Poll	Pre	Wk 1	Wk 2	Wk 3	Wk 4	Wk 5	Wk 6	Wk 7	Wk 8	Wk 9	Wk 10	Wk 11	Wk 12	Wk 13	Wk 14	Wk 15	Wk 16	Wk 17	Wk 18	Post	Final
AP	NR	NR	NR	NR	RV	24	20	17	15	24	RV	RV	NR	NR	NR	NR	NR	RV	RV	NR	N/A
Coaches	NR	NR	NR	NR	RV	RV	23	19	17	24	RV	RV	NR	NR	NR	NR	NR	RV	NR	NR	NR

== Team players drafted into the NBA ==
Round	Pick	Player	NBA club
2	53	Sir'Dominic Pointer	Cleveland Cavaliers
