= 2014–15 Butler Bulldogs men's basketball team =

American college basketball season

2014–15 Butler Bulldogs men's basketball
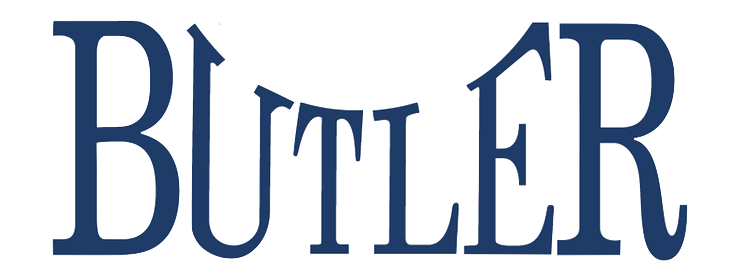

NCAA tournament, round of 32
- Conference: Big East Conference

Ranking
- Coaches: No. 23
- AP: No. 24
- Record: 23–11 (12–6 Big East)
- Head coach: Chris Holtmann (1st season)
- Assistant coaches: Terry Johnson (8th season); Michael Lewis (4th season); Emerson Kampen (1st season)
- Home arena: Hinkle Fieldhouse

2014–15 Big East men's basketball standings
	Conf.				Overall
Team	W		L	PCT	W		L	PCT
No. 2 Villanova †	16	–	2	.889	33	–	3	.917
No. 22 Georgetown	12	–	6	.667	22	–	11	.667
No. 24 Butler	12	–	6	.667	23	–	11	.676
Providence	11	–	7	.611	22	–	12	.647
St. John's	10	–	8	.556	21	–	12	.636
Xavier	9	–	9	.500	23	–	14	.622
DePaul	6	–	12	.333	12	–	20	.375
Seton Hall	6	–	12	.333	16	–	15	.516
Marquette	4	–	14	.222	13	–	19	.406
Creighton	4	–	14	.222	14	–	19	.424
† 2015 Big East tournament winner As of April 6, 2015; Rankings from AP poll

The 2014–15 Butler Bulldogs men's basketball team represented Butler University in the 2014–15 NCAA Division I men's basketball season. Their head coach was Chris Holtmann, who took over as interim head coach after Brandon Miller requested and was granted a medical leave of absence from the university. Holtmann was then named the permanent head coach on January 2, 2015, becoming the 23rd head coach of Butler's men's basketball team. The Bulldogs played their home games at Hinkle Fieldhouse, which has a capacity of approximately 9,100. This was Butler's second season in the Big East Conference. They finished the season 23–11, 12–6 in Big East play to finish in a tie for second place. They lost in the quarterfinals of the Big East tournament to Xavier. The Bulldogs received an at-large bid to the NCAA tournament as a #6 seed and defeated Texas in the second round before losing in the Third Round to Notre Dame.

== Previous season ==
The Bulldogs finished the 2013–14 season with a record of 14–17, 4–14 in Big East play to finish in ninth place. They lost in the first round of the Big East tournament to Seton Hall.

== Off season ==
=== 2014 recruiting class ===
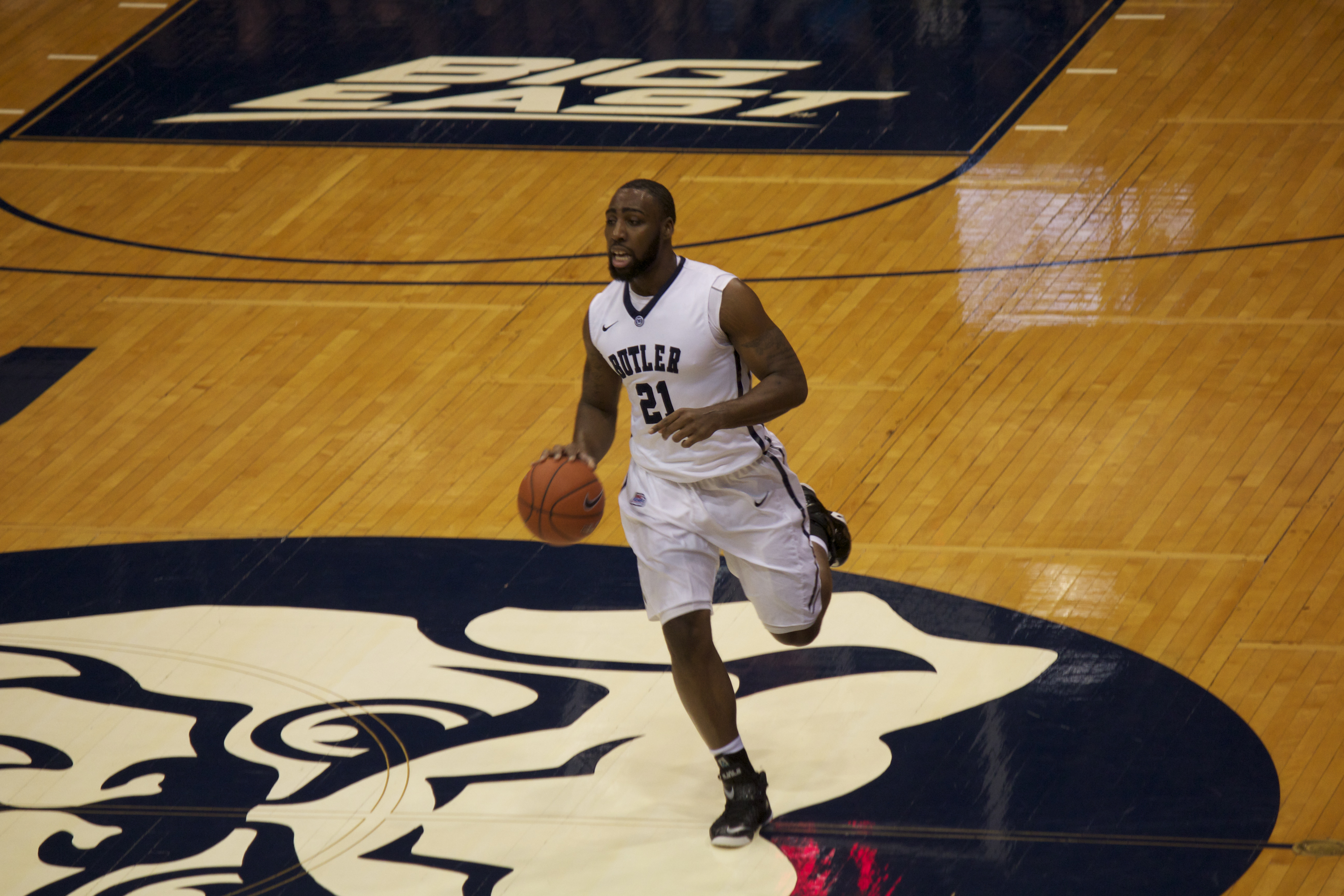
2014 marked the return of Roosevelt Jones, who sat out the entire 2013–14 season with a wrist injury.

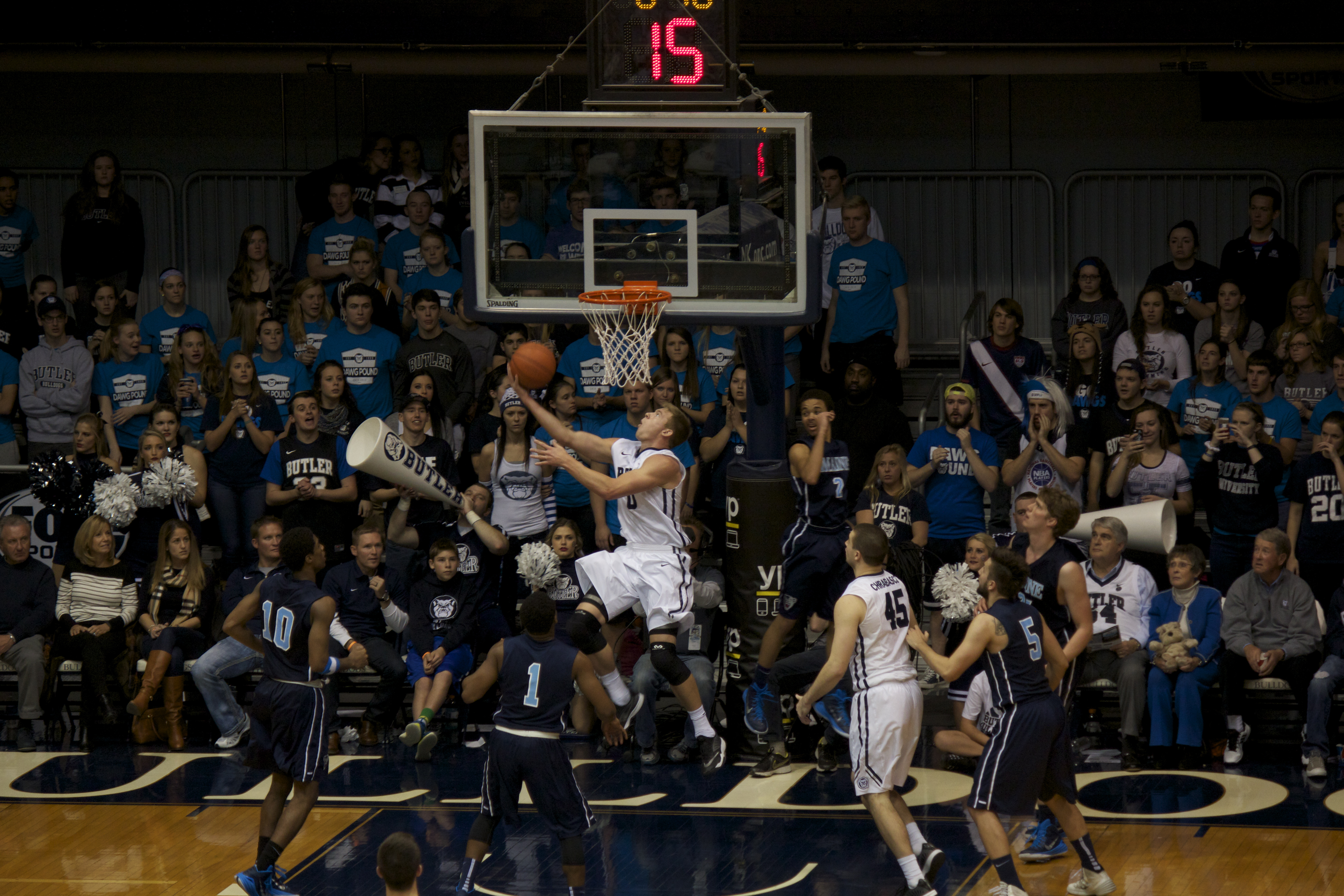
Austin Etherington, completing a layup in a game vs. Maine, transferred from IU to Butler in the offseason.

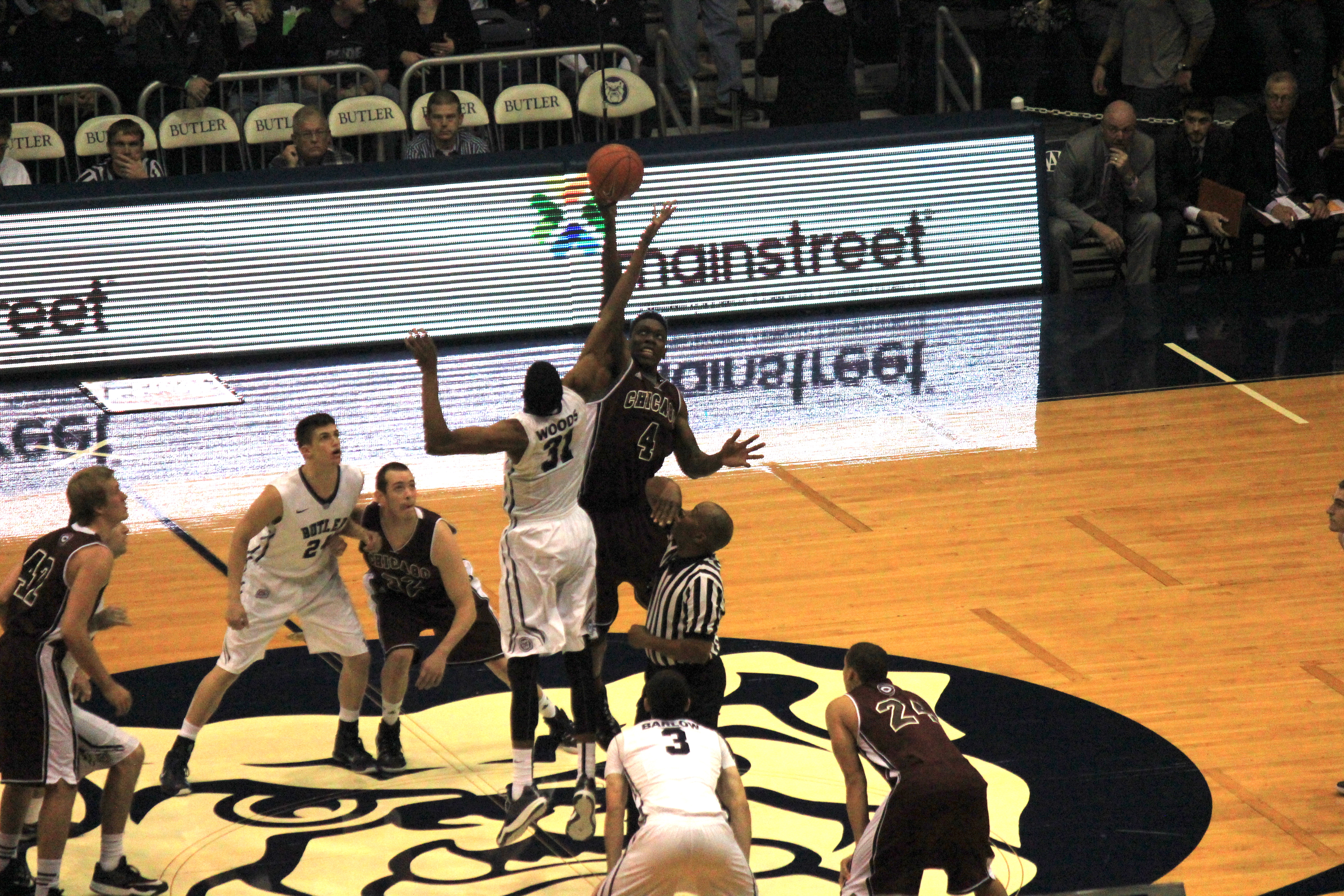
The opening tip off of the exhibition game between Butler and Chicago.

Butler's 2014 spring recruiting run was able to stymie some of the postseason woes of 2013–14, with the entire freshman class save Andrew Chrabascz and walk-on Steven Bennett electing to transfer from the program along with Devontae Morgan from the sophomore class. The Bulldogs gained some considerable size in the front court this season, bringing in three freshman power forwards ranging from 6'6" to 6'8" and a small forward in Austin Etherington, a red-shirt junior transfer from Indiana who is immediately eligible to play. Another highlight of Butler's spring recruiting run was the addition of McDonald's All-American point guard Tyler Lewis, who elected to transfer from NC State and will sit out a year and start playing in the 2015–16 season per NCAA regulations.

College recruiting
Name	Hometown	School	Height	Weight	Commit date
Kelan Martin; Power Forward	Louisville, KY	Ballard High School	6 ft 6 in (1.98 m)	210 lb (95 kg)	Oct 8, 2013
Kelan Martin; Power Forward	Recruit ratings: Scout: Rivals: 247Sports: ESPN: (80)				
Tyler Wideman; Power Forward	Merrillville, IN	Lake Central High School	6 ft 7 in (2.01 m)	245 lb (111 kg)	Jul 20, 2013
Tyler Wideman; Power Forward	Recruit ratings: Scout: Rivals: 247Sports: ESPN: (75)				
Jackson Davis; Power Forward	Lexington, KY	Lafayette High School	6 ft 8 in (2.03 m)	220 lb (100 kg)	Apr 25, 2014
Jackson Davis; Power Forward	Recruit ratings: Scout: Rivals: 247Sports: ESPN: (71)				
Overall recruit ranking:
Note: In many cases, Scout, Rivals, 247Sports, On3, and ESPN may conflict in their listings of height and weight.; In these cases, the average was taken. ESPN grades are on a 100-point scale.; Sources: "2014 Butler Commitments". Rivals.; "Butler Bulldogs Men's Basketball Recruiting 2014". Scout.; "Butler Bulldogs Men's Basketball Recruiting 2014". ESPN.; "Scout.com Team Recruiting Rankings". Scout.; "2014 Team Ranking". Rivals.

=== Departures ===
After the previous season ended, four players announced that they would transfer. Sophomore guard Devontae Morgan, freshman forward Nolan Berry, freshman guard Elijah Brown, and freshman walk-on guard Michael Volovic announced their transfers at various times in the postseason.

Name	Number	Pos.	Height	Weight	Year	Hometown	Notes
Khyle Marshall	23	F	6'6"	216	Senior	Davie, FL	Graduated
Erik Fromm	4	F	6'8"	223	Senior	Bloomington, IN	Graduated
Devontae Morgan	2	G	6'3"	176	Sophomore	Tampa, FL	Transferred
Nolan Berry	22	F/C	6'10"	200	Freshman	St. Louis, MO	Transferred
Michael Volovic	10	G	5'9"	165	Freshman	Carmel, IN	Transferred
Elijah Brown	5	G	6'4"	185	Freshman	Santa Ana, CA	Transferred

== Roster ==
2014–15 Butler Bulldogs men's basketball team
Players
Coaches

Pos.	#	Name	Height	Weight	Year	Previous school	Hometown
G	11	Jackson Aldridge	6 ft 0 in (1.83 m)	187 lb (85 kg)	Sr	Australian Inst. of Sport	Lane Cove, Australia
G	3	Alex Barlow	5 ft 11 in (1.8 m)	187 lb (85 kg)	Sr	Archbishop Moeller	Springboro, OH
G	25	Steven Bennett (W)	6 ft 2 in (1.88 m)	175 lb (79 kg)	So	New Castle	New Castle, IN
F	45	Andrew Chrabascz	6 ft 7 in (2.01 m)	225 lb (102 kg)	So	Cushing	Portsmouth, RI
G	24	Kellen Dunham	6 ft 6 in (1.98 m)	200 lb (91 kg)	Jr	Pendleton Heights	Pendleton, IN
F	21	Roosevelt Jones	6 ft 4 in (1.93 m)	227 lb (103 kg)	RS Jr	O'Fallon	O'Fallon, IL
F	31	Kameron Woods	6 ft 9 in (2.06 m)	200 lb (91 kg)	Sr	Eastern	Middletown, KY
F	30	Kelan Martin	6 ft 6 in (1.98 m)	210 lb (95 kg)	Fr	Ballard	Louisville, KY
F	4	Tyler Wideman	6 ft 8 in (2.03 m)	245 lb (111 kg)	Fr	Lake Central	Merrillville, IN
F	13	Jackson Davis	6 ft 8 in (2.03 m)	210 lb (95 kg)	Fr	Lafayette	Lexington, KY
F	0	Austin Etherington	6 ft 6 in (1.98 m)	215 lb (98 kg)	RS Jr	Hamilton Heights (Indiana)	Cicero, IN
G	1	Tyler Lewis (redshirt)	5 ft 11 in (1.8 m)	170 lb (77 kg)	RS So	Oak Hill Academy (VA) (N.C. State)	Statesville, NC
G	34	Trey Pettus (W)	6 ft 4 in (1.93 m)	195 lb (88 kg)	So	MICDS	St. Louis, MO

Head coach

- Chris Holtmann (Taylor)

Assistant coach(es)

- Terry Johnson (Purdue Fort Wayne)
- Michael Lewis (Indiana)
- Emerson Kampen (Butler)

Legend

- (C) Team captain
- (S) Suspended
- (I) Ineligible
- (W) Walk-on
- Injured
- Current redshirt

Roster
Last update: June 25, 2014

== Regular season ==
=== Schedule ===
Date time, TV	Rank^{#}	Opponent^{#}	Result	Record	High points	High rebounds	High assists	Site (attendance) city, state
Exhibition
Nov 1*; 7:00 pm		Chicago	W 88–45		18 – Dunham	9 – Tied	8 – Jones	Hinkle Fieldhouse (8,684); Indianapolis, IN
Nov 8*; 2:00 pm		Franklin	W 98–43		18 – Tied	5 – Tied	6 – Barlow	Hinkle Fieldhouse (6,624); Indianapolis, IN
Non-conference regular season
Nov 15*; 4:30 pm, FS2		Maine	W 99–57	1–0	18 – Dunham	6 – Tied	9 – Jones	Hinkle Fieldhouse (7,652); Indianapolis, IN
Nov 18*; 9:00 pm, FS2		Chattanooga; Battle 4 Atlantis	W 70–48	2–0	26 – Dunham	16 – Woods	7 – Jones	Hinkle Fieldhouse (5,409); Indianapolis, IN
Nov 22*; 5:00 pm, FS2		Loyola (MD)	W 80–39	3–0	23 – Martin	7 – Martin	6 – Jones	Hinkle Fieldhouse (6,058); Indianapolis, IN
Nov 26*; 12:00 pm, ESPN2		vs. No. 5 North Carolina; Battle 4 Atlantis quarterfinals	W 74–66	4–0	17 – Tied	13 – Woods	6 – Jones	Imperial Arena (3,136); Nassau, BAH
Nov 27*; 1:00 pm, ESPN		vs. Oklahoma; Battle 4 Atlantis semifinals	L 46–59	4–1	17 – Dunham	6 – Jones	2 – Tied	Imperial Arena (2,107); Nassau, BAH
Nov 28*; 2:00 pm, ESPN		vs. Georgetown; Battle 4 Atlantis 3rd place game	W 64–58	5–1	16 – Dunham	7 – Woods	3 – Tied	Imperial Arena (1,542); Nassau, BAH
Dec 3*; 7:05 pm, WNDY	No. 23	at Indiana State	W 77–54	6–1	14 – Tied	12 – Woods	4 – Tied	Hulman Center (5,528); Terre Haute, IN
Dec 6*; 4:30 pm, FOX	No. 23	Northwestern	W 65–56	7–1	19 – Dunham	9 – Woods	4 – Jones	Hinkle Fieldhouse (7,920); Indianapolis, IN
Dec 8*; 7:00 pm, FS1	No. 15	Kennesaw State	W 93–51	8–1	19 – Jones	7 – Jones	7 – Jones	Hinkle Fieldhouse (5,103); Indianapolis, IN
Dec 14*; 2:00 pm, ESPNU	No. 15	at Tennessee	L 55–67	8–2	16 – Dunham	16 – Woods	4 – Barlow	Thompson-Boling Arena (14,058); Knoxville, TN
Dec 20*; 2:30 pm, FS1	No. 23	vs. Indiana; Crossroads Classic	L 73–82	8–3	23 – Dunham	12 – Woods	2 – Jones	Bankers Life Fieldhouse (N/A); Indianapolis, IN
Dec 22*; 7:00 pm, FS1		UT Martin	W 64–37	9–3	17 – Chrabascz	9 – Woods	3 – Woods	Hinkle Fieldhouse (5,891); Indianapolis, IN
Dec 28*; 6:00 pm, FS1		Belmont	W 67–56	10–3	20 – Jones	9 – Wideman	4 – Chrabascz	Hinkle Fieldhouse (7,752); Indianapolis, IN
Big East Conference Play
Dec 31; 2:30 pm, FS1		at No. 6 Villanova	L 55–67	10–4 (0–1)	12 – Tied	9 – Jones	2 – Tied	The Pavilion (6,500); Villanova, PA
Jan 3; 4:00 pm, CBSSN		at No. 15 St. John's	W 73–69	11–4 (1–1)	28 – Dunham	9 – Woods	3 – Jones	Carnesecca Arena (5,602); Queens, NY
Jan 6; 9:00 pm, CBSSN		Providence	L 62–66	11–5 (1–2)	18 – Dunham	11 – Woods	2 – Tied	Hinkle Fieldhouse (5,755); Indianapolis, IN
Jan 10; 4:30 pm, FS1		Xavier	W 88–76	12–5 (2–2)	19 – Chrabascz	11 – Woods	7 – Jones	Hinkle Fieldhouse (9,100); Indianapolis, IN
Jan 13; 7:00 pm, FS1		at No. 21 Seton Hall	W 79–75 ^{OT}	13–5 (3–2)	23 – Jones	15 – Woods	3 – Tied	Prudential Center (7,574); Newark, NJ
Jan 17; 5:00 pm, FS1		at Georgetown	L 59–61	13–6 (3–3)	28 – Jones	6 – Tied	3 – Dunham	Verizon Center (14,821); Washington, D.C.
Jan 21; 9:00 pm, FS1		Creighton	W 64–61	14–6 (4–3)	18 – Jones	10 – Jones	6 – Jones	Hinkle Fieldhouse (6,114); Indianapolis, IN
Jan 25; 3:00 pm, FSN		No. 24 Seton Hall	W 77–57	15–6 (5–3)	16 – Chrabascz	8 – Woods	8 – Barlow	Hinkle Fieldhouse (8,823); Indianapolis, IN
Jan 31; 2:00 pm, FSN	No. 25	at Marquette	W 72–68 ^{OT}	16–6 (6–3)	30 – Chrabascz	18 – Woods	5 – Barlow	BMO Harris Bradley Center (15,342); Milwaukee, WI
Feb 3; 7:00 pm, FS1	No. 22	St. John's	W 85–62	17–6 (7–3)	21 – Dunham	12 – Woods	4 – Jones	Hinkle Fieldhouse (7,132); Indianapolis, IN
Feb 7; 3:30 pm, FS1	No. 22	DePaul	W 83–73	18–6 (8–3)	24 – Dunham	8 – Woods	7 – Barlow	Hinkle Fieldhouse (9,100); Indianapolis, IN
Feb 14; 6:00 pm, CBSSN	No. 18	No. 6 Villanova	L 65–68	18–7 (8–4)	19 – Tied	11 – Woods	3 – Jones	Hinkle Fieldhouse (9,231); Indianapolis, IN
Feb 16; 9:15 pm, FS1	No. 19	at Creighton	W 58–56	19–7 (9–4)	19 – Dunham	10 – Woods	6 – Jones	CenturyLink Center (17,971); Omaha, NE
Feb 21; 2:00 pm, FSN	No. 19	at Xavier	L 56–73	19–8 (9–5)	14 – Jones	9 – Woods	4 – Wideman	Cintas Center (10,492); Cincinnati, OH
Feb 25; 8:00 pm, FS1	No. 23	Marquette	W 73–52	20–8 (10–5)	22 – Dunham	8 – Wideman	6 – Tied	Hinkle Fieldhouse (7,830); Indianapolis, IN
Feb 28; 2:00 pm, FS2	No. 23	at DePaul	W 67–53	21–8 (11–5)	24 – Dunham	6 – Tied	4 – Jones	Allstate Arena (8,805); Rosemont, IL
Mar 3; 7:00 pm, FS1	No. 21	Georgetown	L 54–60	21–9 (11–6)	15 – Woods	16 – Woods	3 – Jones	Hinkle Fieldhouse (9,100); Indianapolis, IN
Mar 7; 12:00 PM, FS1	No. 21	at No. 24 Providence	W 68–64	22–9 (12–6)	16 – Jones	12 – Woods	4 – Chrabascz	Dunkin' Donuts Center (12,400); Providence, RI
Big East tournament
Mar 12; 9:30 pm, FS1	(3) No. 22	(6) Xavier; Quarterfinals	L 61–67 ^{OT}	22–10	22 – Barlow	14 – Woods	4 – Jones	Madison Square Garden (13,245); New York, NY
NCAA tournament
Mar 19*; 2:45 pm, CBS	(6 MW) No. 24	vs. (11 MW) Texas; Second round	W 56–48	23–10	20 – Dunham	9 – Woods	4 – Jones	Consol Energy Center (15,818); Pittsburgh, PA
Mar 21*; 9:40 pm, TBS	(6 MW) No. 24	vs. (3 MW) No. 8 Notre Dame; Third round	L 64–67 ^{OT}	23–11	23 – Jones	15 – Woods	3 – Tied	Consol Energy Center (18,762); Pittsburgh, PA
*Non-conference game. ^{#}Rankings from AP Poll. (#) Tournament seedings in parentheses. MW=Midwest Region. All times are in Eastern Time.

== Rankings ==
Ranking movement Legend: ██ Improvement in ranking. ██ Decrease in ranking. RV=Received votes.
Poll	Pre	Wk 1	Wk 2	Wk 3	Wk 4	Wk 5	Wk 6	Wk 7	Wk 8	Wk 9	Wk 10	Wk 11	Wk 12	Wk 13	Wk 14	Wk 15	Wk 16	Wk 17	Wk 18	Post	Final
AP	NR	NR	NR	NR	23	15	23	RV	NR	RV	RV	RV	25	22	18	19	23	21	22	24	N/A
Coaches	NR	NR	NR	NR	RV	19	25	RV	NR	RV	NR	RV	RV	22	18	19	23	21	22	23	23

=== Awards ===
Name	Award(s)
Alex Barlow	Academic All-District; Academic All-American; Big East Sportsmanship Award; Big East Scholar-Athlete of the Year; Lowe's Senior Class Award
Kellen Dunham	Preseason All-Big East First Team; Battle 4 Atlantis All-tournament Team; Big East Player of the Week - February 9 All-Big East First Team
Roosevelt Jones	Preseason All-Big East Honorable Mention; All-Big East Second Team

== 2014–15 Postseason ==
As part of the Final Four weekend, on April 2 Alex Barlow represented Butler in the State Farm 2015 College Slam Dunk and 3-pt contest. After advancing past the first two rounds, Barlow met Kevin Pangos in the final round, just barely getting edged, 22–21. A sold out Hinkle Fieldhouse erupted in cheers for the graduating senior, a fan favorite. Another Butler senior, Kameron Woods, participated in the Reese's College All-Star Game on the East Team, joining five other Big East players on the roster. Although the East lost to the West 109–87, Woods dominated the glass, pulling down 14 rebounds - six more than any other player in the game.
