= 2014–15 Providence Friars men's basketball team =

American college basketball season

2014–15 Providence Friars men's basketball
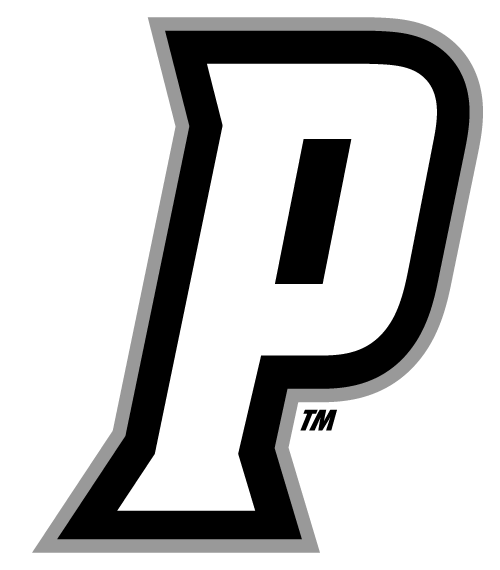

Hall of Fame Tip Off champions

NCAA tournament, round of 64
- Conference: Big East Conference
- Record: 22–12 (11–7 Big East)
- Head coach: Ed Cooley
- Assistant coaches: Andre LaFleur; Bob Simon; Brian Blaney
- Home arena: Dunkin' Donuts Center

2014–15 Big East men's basketball standings
	Conf.				Overall
Team	W		L	PCT	W		L	PCT
No. 2 Villanova †	16	–	2	.889	33	–	3	.917
No. 22 Georgetown	12	–	6	.667	22	–	11	.667
No. 24 Butler	12	–	6	.667	23	–	11	.676
Providence	11	–	7	.611	22	–	12	.647
St. John's	10	–	8	.556	21	–	12	.636
Xavier	9	–	9	.500	23	–	14	.622
DePaul	6	–	12	.333	12	–	20	.375
Seton Hall	6	–	12	.333	16	–	15	.516
Marquette	4	–	14	.222	13	–	19	.406
Creighton	4	–	14	.222	14	–	19	.424
† 2015 Big East tournament winner As of April 6, 2015; Rankings from AP poll

The 2014–15 Providence Friars men's basketball team represented Providence College during the 2014–15 NCAA Division I men's basketball season. The Friars, led by fourth-year head coach Ed Cooley, played their home games at the Dunkin' Donuts Center, and were members of the Big East Conference. They finished the season 22–12, 11–7 in Big East play to finish in fourth place. They advanced to the semifinals of the Big East tournament where they lost to Villanova. They received an at-large bid to the NCAA tournament where they lost in the second round to Dayton.

== Previous season ==
The Friars finished the season 23–12, 10–8 in Big East play to finish in a three-way tie for third place. They were champions of the Big East tournament to earn the conference's automatic bid to the NCAA tournament where they lost in the second round to North Carolina.

== Departures ==
Name	Number	Pos.	Height	Weight	Year	Hometown	Notes
Brandon Austin	1	F	6’6"	185	Freshman	Philadelphia, PA	Transferred to Oregon. Was going to be eligible to play at the start of Oregon's fall quarter in 2014. Later, dismissed from the team due to sexual assault allegations
Josh Fortune	4	G	6'5"	205	Sophomore	Hampton, VA	Transferred to Colorado
Kadeem Batts	10	F	6'9"	245	RS Senior	Boston, MA	Graduated
Bryce Cotton	11	G	6'1"	165	Senior	Tucson, AZ	Graduated/Went undrafted in 2014 NBA draft
Brice Kofane	13	F	6'8"	210	RS Junior	Yaoundé, Cameroon	Graduate transferred to Monmouth
Lee Goldsbrough	21	F	6'9"	230	Senior	Newcastle, England	Graduated

== Incoming recruits ==
College recruiting
Name	Hometown	School	Height	Weight	Commit date
Paschal Chukwu; C	Westport, CT	Fairfield College Prep	7 ft 1 in (2.16 m)	220 lb (100 kg)	Aug 29, 2013
Paschal Chukwu; C	Recruit ratings: Scout: Rivals: (86)				
Jalen Lindsey; SF	Franklin, TN	Huntington Prep	6 ft 7 in (2.01 m)	180 lb (82 kg)	Jul 15, 2013
Jalen Lindsey; SF	Recruit ratings: Scout: Rivals: (83)				
Ben Bentil; PF	Middletown, DE	Saint Andrew's School	6 ft 8 in (2.03 m)	225 lb (102 kg)	Sep 30, 2013
Ben Bentil; PF	Recruit ratings: Scout: Rivals: (80)				
Kyron Cartwright; PG	Compton, CA	Compton High School	5 ft 11 in (1.80 m)	155 lb (70 kg)	Apr 7, 2014
Kyron Cartwright; PG	Recruit ratings: Scout: Rivals: (72)				
Tyree Chambers; PG	Bayreuth, Germany	Graf-Münster-Gymnasium	6 ft 2 in (1.88 m)	182 lb (83 kg)	Aug 30, 2014
Tyree Chambers; PG	Recruit ratings: No ratings found				
Overall recruit ranking:
Note: In many cases, Scout, Rivals, 247Sports, On3, and ESPN may conflict in their listings of height and weight.; In these cases, the average was taken. ESPN grades are on a 100-point scale.; Sources: "2014 Providence Signees". Rivals.; "2014 Providence Signees". Scout.; "2014 Providence Signees". ESPN.; "Scout.com Team Recruiting Rankings". Scout.; "2014 Team Ranking". Rivals.

=== Class of 2015 recruits ===
College recruiting
Name	Hometown	School	Height	Weight	Commit date
Alex Owens; PF	Orlando, FL	Oak Ridge High School	6 ft 8 in (2.03 m)	240 lb (110 kg)	Aug 11, 2014
Alex Owens; PF	Recruit ratings: Scout: Rivals: (83)				
Ryan Fazekas; SF	Michigan City, IN	Marquette Catholic High School	6 ft 7 in (2.01 m)	180 lb (82 kg)	Oct 29, 2013
Ryan Fazekas; SF	Recruit ratings: Scout: Rivals: (81)				
Drew Edwards; SG	Towson, MD	Calvert Hall College High School	6 ft 3 in (1.91 m)	170 lb (77 kg)	Aug 28, 2014
Drew Edwards; SG	Recruit ratings: Scout: Rivals: (79)				
Overall recruit ranking:
Note: In many cases, Scout, Rivals, 247Sports, On3, and ESPN may conflict in their listings of height and weight.; In these cases, the average was taken. ESPN grades are on a 100-point scale.; Sources: "2015 Providence Signees". Rivals.; "2015 Providence Signees". Scout.; "2015 Providence Signees". ESPN.; "Scout.com Team Recruiting Rankings". Scout.; "2015 Team Ranking". Rivals.

== Roster ==
2014–15 Providence Friars men's basketball team
Players
Coaches

Pos.	#	Name	Height	Weight	Year	Previous school	Hometown
F	0	Ben Bentil	6 ft 8 in (2.03 m)	230 lb (104 kg)	Fr	St. Andrew's School	Wilmington, Delaware
G	3	Kris Dunn	6 ft 3 in (1.91 m)	205 lb (93 kg)	So	New London High School	New London, Connecticut
F	5	Rodney Bullock	6 ft 7 in (2.01 m)	220 lb (100 kg)	RS Fr	Kecoughtan High School	Hampton, Virginia
G	12	Casey Woodring (W)	6 ft 2 in (1.88 m)	180 lb (82 kg)	So	Cushing Academy	Darien, Connecticut
C	13	Paschal Chukwu	7 ft 2 in (2.18 m)	226 lb (103 kg)	Fr	Fairfield Prep	Westport, Connecticut
G	14	Tyree Chambers	6 ft 2 in (1.88 m)	182 lb (83 kg)	Fr	Graf-Münster-Gymnasium	Bayreuth, Germany
F	21	Jalen Lindsay	6 ft 7 in (2.01 m)	195 lb (88 kg)	Fr	Huntington Prep	Murfreesboro, Tennessee
G	22	Ted Bancroft	6 ft 6 in (1.98 m)	215 lb (98 kg)	GS	Bishop Stang High School	Marion, Massachusetts
F	23	LaDontae Henton	6 ft 6 in (1.98 m)	215 lb (98 kg)	Sr	Eastern High School	Lansing, Michigan
G	24	Kyron Cartwright	5 ft 11 in (1.8 m)	185 lb (84 kg)	Fr	Compton High School	Compton, California
F	25	Tyler Harris	6 ft 9 in (2.06 m)	223 lb (101 kg)	RS Jr	St. Benedict's Prep	Dix Hills, New York
G	32	Junior Lomomba	6 ft 5 in (1.96 m)	200 lb (91 kg)	RS So	Madison Memorial	Montreal, Quebec
F	33	Carson Desrosiers	7 ft 0 in (2.13 m)	250 lb (113 kg)	Sr	Central Catholic High School	Windham, New Hampshire
F	34	Tom Planek (W)	6 ft 6 in (1.98 m)	195 lb (88 kg)	Fr	Fenwick High School	Oak Park, Illinois

Head coach

Ed Cooley

Assistant coach(es)

Andre LaFleur
Bob Simon
Brian Blaney

Legend

- (C) Team captain
- (S) Suspended
- (I) Ineligible
- (W) Walk-on
- Injured
- Current redshirt

Roster

== Schedule ==
Date time, TV	Rank^{#}	Opponent^{#}	Result	Record	Site (attendance) city, state
Exhibition
November 8*; 4:00 pm		Stonehill College	W 93–49	–	Dunkin' Donuts Center (4,234); Providence, RI
Non-conference regular season
November 15*; 7:00 pm, FS2		Albany	W 64–60	1–0	Dunkin' Donuts Center (9,599); Providence, RI
November 17*; 9:00 pm, FS1		Binghamton; Hall of Fame Tip Off	W 66–45	2–0	Dunkin' Donuts Center (4,033); Providence, RI
November 20*; 7:00 pm, FS2		Navy; Hall of Fame Tip Off	W 88–51	3–0	Dunkin' Donuts Center (6,051); Providence, RI
November 22*; 2:30 pm, ESPN3		vs. Florida State; Hall of Fame Tip Off	W 80–54	4–0	Mohegan Sun Arena (N/A); Uncasville, CT
November 23*; 2:30 pm, ESPN2		vs. Notre Dame; Hall of Fame Tip Off	W 75–74	5–0	Mohegan Sun Arena (6,513); Uncasville, CT
November 28*; 4:00 pm, FS1		Yale	W 72–66	6–0	Dunkin' Donuts Center (8,045); Providence, RI
November 30*; 2:00 pm, ESPN2		at No. 1 Kentucky	L 38–58	6–1	Rupp Arena (23,601); Lexington, KY
December 5*; 7:00 pm, ESPN3		at Boston College	L 60–69	6–2	Conte Forum (6,155); Chestnut Hill, MA
December 8*; 9:00 pm, FS1		Brown; Ocean State Cup	L 67–77	6–3	Dunkin' Donuts Center (4,124); Providence, RI
December 10*; 7:00 pm, FS2		Rhode Island; Ocean State Cup	W 68–60	7–3	Dunkin' Donuts Center (12,246); Providence, RI
December 13*; 12:00 pm, FSN		Stony Brook	W 79–61	8–3	Dunkin' Donuts Center (5,132); Providence, RI
December 20*; 1:00 pm, CBSSN		Massachusetts	W 85–65	9–3	Dunkin' Donuts Center (7,975); Providence, RI
December 22*; 9:00 pm, FS1		vs. Miami (FL); Brooklyn Hoops Holiday Invitational	W 76–62	10–3	Barclays Center (6,519); Brooklyn, NY
Big East Conference Play
December 31; 7:30 pm, FS1		Creighton	W 65–53	11–3 (1–0)	Dunkin' Donuts Center (8,961); Providence, RI
January 3; 2:00 pm, FSN		at Marquette	L 66–75	11–4 (1–1)	BMO Harris Bradley Center (15,134); Milwaukee, WI
January 6; 9:00 pm, CBSSN		at Butler	W 66–62	12–4 (2–1)	Hinkle Fieldhouse (5,755); Indianapolis, IN
January 10; 12:00 pm, FS1		Georgetown	W 60–57 ^{OT}	13–4 (3–1)	Dunkin' Donuts Center (10,786); Providence, RI
January 14; 7:00 pm, FS1		St. John's	L 70–83	13–5 (3–2)	Dunkin' Donuts Center (8,176); Providence, RI
January 17; 7:30 pm, FS1		at Creighton	W 74–65	14–5 (4–2)	CenturyLink Center (17,640); Omaha, NE
January 22; 7:00 pm, FS1		Xavier	W 69–66 ^{OT}	15–5 (5–2)	Dunkin' Donuts Center (8,250); Providence, RI
January 27; 9:00 pm, FS1		DePaul			Dunkin' Donuts Center (–); Providence, RI
January 29; 2:00 pm, FS1		DePaul	W 83–72	16–5 (6–2)	Dunkin' Donuts Center (3,568); Providence, RI
January 31; 12:00 pm, FOX		at St. John's	L 66–75	16–6 (6–3)	Madison Square Garden (8,973); New York, NY
February 4; 9:10 pm, CBSSN		at No. 24 Georgetown	W 74–71	17–6 (7–3)	Verizon Center (7,981); Washington, D.C.
February 7; 1:00 pm, FS1		at Xavier	L 69–78	17–7 (7–4)	Cintas Center (10,250); Cincinnati, OH
February 11; 8:00 pm, FS1		No. 6 Villanova	L 68–74	17–8 (7–5)	Dunkin' Donuts Center (12,410); Providence, RI
February 14; 4:00 pm, FSN		Seton Hall	W 69–62	18–8 (8–5)	Dunkin' Donuts Center (12,120); Providence, RI
February 18; 9:00 pm, CBSSN		at DePaul	W 84–57	19–8 (9–5)	Allstate Arena (5,923); Rosemont, IL
February 24; 7:00 pm, FS1	No. 25	at No. 6 Villanova	L 61–89	19–9 (9–6)	The Pavilion (6,500); Villanova, PA
March 1; 3:30 pm, FS1	No. 25	Marquette	W 77–66	20–9 (10–6)	Dunkin' Donuts Center (12,568); Providence, RI
March 4; 7:00 pm, FS1	No. 24	at Seton Hall	W 79–66	21–9 (11–6)	Prudential Center (7,162); Newark, NJ
March 7; 12:00 noon, FSN	No. 24	No. 21 Butler	L 64–68	21–10 (11–7)	Dunkin' Donuts Center (12,400); Providence, RI
Big East tournament
March 12; 2:30 p.m., FS1	(4)	vs. (5) St. John's; Quarterfinals	W 74–57	22–10	Madison Square Garden (15,197); New York, NY
March 13; 7:00 p.m., FS1	(4)	vs. (1) No. 4 Villanova; Semifinals	L 61–63	22–11	Madison Square Garden (15,194); New York, NY
NCAA tournament
March 20*; 9:57 pm, truTV	(6 E)	vs. (11 E) Dayton; Second round	L 53–66	22–12	Nationwide Arena (17,584); Columbus, OH
*Non-conference game. ^{#}Rankings from AP Poll. (#) Tournament seedings in parentheses. All times are in Eastern Time. (#) during NCAA Tournament is seed with Region E=East.

== Rankings ==
Ranking movement Legend: ██ Increase in ranking. ██ Decrease in ranking. (RV) Received votes but unranked. (NR) Not ranked.
Poll	Pre	Wk 2	Wk 3	Wk 4	Wk 5	Wk 6	Wk 7	Wk 8	Wk 9	Wk 10	Wk 11	Wk 12	Wk 13	Wk 14	Wk 15	Wk 16	Wk 17	Wk 18	Post	Final
AP			RV	RV						RV	RV	RV	RV	RV	RV	25	24	RV	RV	N/A
Coaches	RV		25	RV	RV					RV	RV	RV	RV	RV	RV	RV	23	RV	RV	RV
