= 2014–15 Xavier Musketeers men's basketball team =

American college basketball season

2014–15 Xavier Musketeers men's basketball

NCAA tournament, Sweet Sixteen
- Conference: Big East Conference

Ranking
- Coaches: No. 22
- Record: 23–14 (9–9 Big East)
- Head coach: Chris Mack (6th season)
- Assistant coaches: Rich Carter; Mike Pegues; Travis Steele
- Home arena: Cintas Center

2014–15 Big East men's basketball standings
	Conf.				Overall
Team	W		L	PCT	W		L	PCT
No. 2 Villanova †	16	–	2	.889	33	–	3	.917
No. 22 Georgetown	12	–	6	.667	22	–	11	.667
No. 24 Butler	12	–	6	.667	23	–	11	.676
Providence	11	–	7	.611	22	–	12	.647
St. John's	10	–	8	.556	21	–	12	.636
Xavier	9	–	9	.500	23	–	14	.622
DePaul	6	–	12	.333	12	–	20	.375
Seton Hall	6	–	12	.333	16	–	15	.516
Marquette	4	–	14	.222	13	–	19	.406
Creighton	4	–	14	.222	14	–	19	.424
† 2015 Big East tournament winner As of April 6, 2015; Rankings from AP poll

The 2014–15 Xavier Musketeers men's basketball team represented Xavier University during the 2014–15 NCAA Division I men's basketball season. Led by fifth year head coach Chris Mack, they played their games at the Cintas Center and were second year members of the Big East Conference. They finished the season 23–14, 9–9 in Big East play to finish in sixth place. They advanced to the championship game of the Big East tournament where they lost to Villanova. They received an at-large bid to the NCAA tournament where they defeated Ole Miss in the second round and Georgia State in the Third Round before losing in the Sweet Sixteen to Arizona.

== Previous season ==
The Musketeers finished the 2014–15 season 21–13, 10–8 in Big East play to finish in a three-way tie for third place. They advanced to the semifinals of the Big East tournament where they lost to Creighton. They received an at-large bid to the NCAA tournament where the lost in the first round ("First Four") to NC State.

== Departures ==
Name	Number	Pos.	Height	Weight	Year	Hometown	Notes
Semaj Christon	0	G	6'3"	190	Sophomore	Cincinnati, OH	Entered 2014 NBA draft
Tim Whelan	14	G	5'9"	160	Senior	Cincinnati, OH	Graduated
Justin Martin	20	F	6'6"	205	RS Junior	Indianapolis, IN	Graduate transferred to SMU
Landen Amos	22	G	6'4"	185	Senior	Chicago, IL	Graduated
Kamall Richards	24	F	6'6"	210	Freshman	Brooklyn, NY	Transferred to Harcum College
Isaiah Philmore	31	F	6'8"	230	RS Senior	Bel Air, MD	Graduated
Erik Stenger	35	F	6'8"	207	RS Senior	Cincinnati, OH	Graduated

== Incoming recruits ==
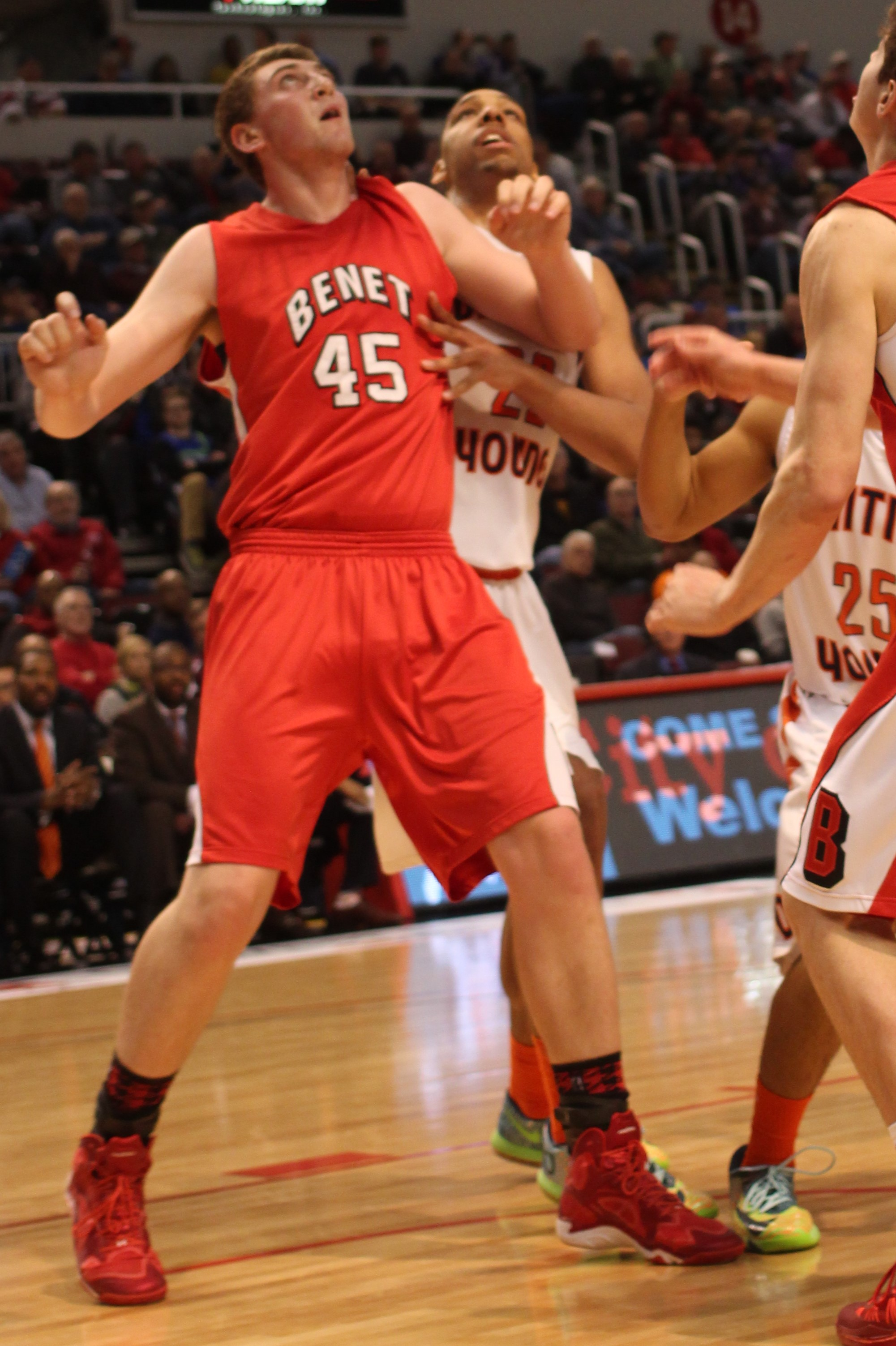
Incoming freshman Sean O'Mara shown boxing out Jahlil Okafor in the 2014 IHSA Class 4A championship game

College recruiting information
Name	Hometown	School	Height	Weight	Commit date
Trevon Bluiett; SF	Indianapolis, IN	Park Tudor School	6 ft 5 in (1.96 m)	205 lb (93 kg)	Nov 1, 2013
Trevon Bluiett; SF	Recruit ratings: Scout: Rivals: (87)				
Edmond Sumner; PG	Detroit, MI	Detroit Country Day School	6 ft 3 in (1.91 m)	160 lb (73 kg)	May 12, 2013
Edmond Sumner; PG	Recruit ratings: Scout: Rivals: (83)				
Larry Austin; PG	Springfield, IL	Lanphier High School	6 ft 1 in (1.85 m)	161 lb (73 kg)	May 10, 2014
Larry Austin; PG	Recruit ratings: Scout: Rivals: (79)				
Makinde London; PF	Nashville, TN	Montverde Academy	6 ft 9 in (2.06 m)	195 lb (88 kg)	Sep 25, 2013
Makinde London; PF	Recruit ratings: Scout: Rivals: (79)				
J. P. Macura; SF	Lakeville, MN	Lakeville North High School	6 ft 5 in (1.96 m)	175 lb (79 kg)	Sep 9, 2013
J. P. Macura; SF	Recruit ratings: Scout: Rivals: (78)				
Sean O'Mara; C	Glen Ellyn, IL	Benet Academy	6 ft 9 in (2.06 m)	240 lb (110 kg)	Oct 1, 2013
Sean O'Mara; C	Recruit ratings: Scout: Rivals: (74)				
Overall recruit ranking:
Note: In many cases, Scout, Rivals, 247Sports, On3, and ESPN may conflict in their listings of height and weight.; In these cases, the average was taken. ESPN grades are on a 100-point scale.; Sources: "2014 Team Ranking". Rivals.

== Rankings ==
Ranking movement Legend: ██ Improvement in ranking. ██ Decrease in ranking. ██ Not ranked the previous week. RV=Others receiving votes.
Poll	Pre Nov 10	Wk 2 Nov 17	Wk 3 Nov 24	Wk 4 Dec 1	Wk 5 Dec 8	Wk 6 Dec 15	Wk 7 Dec 22	Wk 8 Dec 29	Wk 9 Jan 5	Wk 10 Jan 12	Wk 11 Jan 19	Wk 12 Jan 26	Wk 13 Feb 2	Wk 14 Feb 9	Wk 14 Feb 16	Wk 16 Feb 23	Wk 17 Mar 2	Wk 18 Mar 9	Post Mar 16	Final Apr 6
AP			RV						RV				RV	RV					RV	N/A
Coaches																			RV	22

== Roster ==
2014–15 Xavier Musketeers men's basketball team
Players
Coaches

Pos.	#	Name	Height	Weight	Year	Hometown
G	0	Larry Austin, Jr.	6 ft 2 in (1.88 m)	174 lb (79 kg)	Fr	Springfield, Illinois
F	1	Jalen Reynolds	6 ft 10 in (2.08 m)	232 lb (105 kg)	So	Livonia, Michigan
F	2	James Farr	6 ft 10 in (2.08 m)	247 lb (112 kg)	Jr	Evanston, Illinois
G	3	Brandon Randolph	6 ft 2 in (1.88 m)	189 lb (86 kg)	So	Inglewood, California
G	4	Edmond Sumner	6 ft 5 in (1.96 m)	170 lb (77 kg)	Fr	Detroit, Michigan
F	5	Trevon Bluiett	6 ft 6 in (1.98 m)	215 lb (98 kg)	Fr	Indianapolis, Indiana
G	10	Remy Abell	6 ft 4 in (1.93 m)	195 lb (88 kg)	RS Jr	Louisville, Kentucky
G	11	Darwin Davis	6 ft 0 in (1.83 m)	170 lb (77 kg)	Sr	Bloomington, Indiana
F	13	Makinde London	6 ft 10 in (2.08 m)	210 lb (95 kg)	Fr	Nashville, Tennessee
G	15	Myles Davis	6 ft 2 in (1.88 m)	195 lb (88 kg)	Fr	Plainfield, New Jersey
F	21	Tim Stainbrook	6 ft 6 in (1.98 m)	200 lb (91 kg)	So	Bay Village, Ohio
F	32	Kevin Coker	6 ft 6 in (1.98 m)	200 lb (91 kg)	Jr	Plainfield, Illinois
C	40	Matt Stainbrook (W)	6 ft 10 in (2.08 m)	270 lb (122 kg)	RS Sr	Bay Village, Ohio
F/C	54	Sean O'Mara	6 ft 10 in (2.08 m)	247 lb (112 kg)	Fr	Lisle, Illinois
G	55	J. P. Macura	6 ft 5 in (1.96 m)	190 lb (86 kg)	Fr	Lakeville, Minnesota

Head coach

- Chris Mack (Xavier)

Assistant coach(es)

- Mike Pegues (Delaware)
- Travis Steele (Butler)
- Rich Carter (Michigan State)

Legend

- (C) Team captain
- (S) Suspended
- (I) Ineligible
- (W) Walk-on
- Injured
- Current redshirt

Roster

== Schedule ==
Date time, TV	Rank^{#}	Opponent^{#}	Result	Record	Site (attendance) city, state
Exhibition
11/08/2014*; 8:00 pm		Northwood	W 102–68		Cintas Center (9,152); Cincinnati, OH
Regular season
11/14/2014*; 7:00 pm, FCS		Northern Arizona	W 93–60	1–0	Cintas Center (10,250); Cincinnati, OH
11/18/2014*; 7:00 pm, FS1		Long Beach State	W 97–74	2–0	Cintas Center (9,457); Cincinnati, OH
11/21/2014*; 8:00 pm, FS2		Stephen F. Austin	W 81–63	3–0	Cintas Center (9,514); Cincinnati, OH
11/24/2014*; 7:00 pm, FS1		Murray State	W 89–62	4–0	Cintas Center (9,446); Cincinnati, OH
11/27/2014*; 4:30 pm, ESPN2		vs. San Diego; Wooden Legacy quarterfinals	W 82–71	5–0	Titan Gym (N/A); Fullerton, CA
11/28/2014*; 4:30 pm, ESPN2		vs. UTEP; Wooden Legacy semifinals	L 73–77	5–1	Titan Gym (N/A); Fullerton, CA
11/30/2014*; 4:30 pm, ESPNU		vs. Long Beach State; Wooden Legacy 3rd place game	L 70–73	5–2	Honda Center (N/A); Anaheim, CA
12/06/2014*; 8:00 pm, CBSSN		Alabama	W 97–84	6–2	Cintas Center (10,250); Cincinnati, OH
12/09/2014*; 7:00 pm, FS1		IUPUI	W 66–43	7–2	Cintas Center (9,634); Cincinnati, OH
12/13/2014*; 4:00 pm, ESPN2		at Missouri	W 74–58	8–2	Mizzou Arena (7,854); Columbia, MO
12/20/2014*; 6:00 pm, SECN		at Auburn	L 88–89 ^{2OT}	8–3	Auburn Arena (7,975); Auburn, AL
12/28/2014*; 4:00 pm, FS1		Florida Gulf Coast	W 71–57	9–3	Cintas Center (9,908); Cincinnati, OH
12/31/2014; 10:00 pm, FS1		No. 25 Georgetown	W 70–53	10–3 (1–0)	Cintas Center (9,558); Cincinnati, OH
01/03/2015; 2:00 pm, FS1		at DePaul	L 68–71	10–4 (1–1)	Allstate Arena (6,827); Rosemont, IL
01/07/2015; 7:00 pm, CBSSN		No. 19 Seton Hall	W 69–58	11–4 (2–1)	Cintas Center (10,250); Cincinnati, OH
01/10/2015; 4:30 pm, FSN		at Butler	L 76–88	11–5 (2–2)	Hinkle Fieldhouse (9,100); Indianapolis, IN
01/14/2015; 9:00 pm, FS1		at No. 5 Villanova	L 75–88	11–6 (2–3)	Wells Fargo Center (6,500); Philadelphia, PA
01/17/2015; 12:00 pm, FSN		Marquette	W 62–58	12–6 (3–3)	Cintas Center (10,372); Cincinnati, OH
01/22/2015; 7:00 pm, FSN		at Providence	L 66–69 ^{OT}	12–7 (3–4)	Dunkin' Donuts Center (8,250); Providence, RI
01/24/2015; 12:00 pm, FS1		DePaul	W 89–76	13–7 (4–4)	Cintas Center (10,250); Cincinnati, OH
01/27/2015; 7:00 pm, FS1		at No. 21 Georgetown	W 66–53	14–7 (5–4)	Verizon Center (8,576); Washington, D.C.
01/31/2015; 12:00 pm, FS1		at Seton Hall	L 82–90	14–8 (5–5)	Prudential Center (8,205); Newark, NJ
02/04/2015; 9:10 pm, FS1		Creighton	L 72–79 ^{OT}	14–9 (5–6)	Cintas Center (9,843); Cincinnati, OH
02/07/2015; 1:00 pm, FS1		Providence	W 78–69	15–9 (6–6)	Cintas Center (10,250); Cincinnati, OH
02/10/2015; 9:15 pm, FS1		at Marquette	W 64–44	16–9 (7–6)	BMO Harris Bradley Center (12,833); Milwaukee, WI
02/14/2015; 12:30 pm, FOX		St. John's	L 70–78	16–10 (7–7)	Cintas Center (10,250); Cincinnati, OH
02/18/2015*; 7:00 pm, ESPN2		at Cincinnati; Skyline Chilli Crosstown Classic	W 59–57	17–10	Fifth Third Arena (13,176); Cincinnati, OH
02/21/2015; 2:00 pm, FSN		No. 19 Butler	W 73–56	18–10 (8–7)	Cintas Center (10,492); Cincinnati, OH
02/23/2015; 8:00 pm, FS1		at St. John's	L 57–58	18–11 (8–8)	Madison Square Garden (6,634); New York, NY
02/28/2015; 2:00 pm, FOX		No. 6 Villanova	L 66–78	18–12 (8–9)	Cintas Center (10,250); Cincinnati, OH
03/07/2015; 2:00 pm, FS2		at Creighton	W 74–73	19–12 (9–9)	CenturyLink Center (16,751); Omaha, NE
Big East tournament
03/12/2015; 9:30 pm, FS1	(6)	vs. (3) No. 22 Butler; Quarterfinal	W 67–61 ^{OT}	20–12	Madison Square Garden (13,245); New York, NY
03/13/2015; 9:45 pm, FS1	(6)	vs. (2) No. 23 Georgetown; Semifinal	W 65–63	21–12	Madison Square Garden (15,194); New York, NY
03/14/2015; 8:00 pm, FS1	(6)	vs. (1) No. 4 Villanova; Championship game	L 52–69	21–13	Madison Square Garden (13,471); New York, NY
NCAA tournament
03/19/2015*; 4:10 pm, TBS	(6 W)	vs. (11 W) Ole Miss; Second round	W 76–57	22–13	Jacksonville Veterans Memorial Arena (N/A); Jacksonville, FL
03/21/2015*; 6:10 pm, TNT	(6 W)	vs. (14 W) Georgia State; Third round	W 75–67	23–13	Jacksonville Veterans Memorial Arena (13,687); Jacksonville, FL
03/26/2015*; 10:17 pm, TBS	(6 W)	vs. (2 W) No. 5 Arizona; Sweet Sixteen	L 60–68	23–14	Staples Center (18,809); Los Angeles, CA
*Non-conference game. ^{#}Rankings from AP Poll. (#) Tournament seedings in parentheses. W=West Region. All times are in Eastern Time.
