= 2014–15 Big East Conference men's basketball season =

- League: NCAA Division I
- Sport: Basketball
- Teams: 10
- TV partner(s): CBS, CBSSN, FOX, FS1, FSN

Regular Season
- Champions: Villanova
- Runners-up: Georgetown
- Season MVP: Ryan Arcidiacono, Kris Dunn
- Top scorer: LaDontae Henton

Tournament
- Champions: Villanova
- Runners-up: Xavier
- Finals MVP: Josh Hart

Basketball seasons
- ← 2013–14 2015–16 →

2014–15 Big East men's basketball standings
	Conf.				Overall
Team	W		L	PCT	W		L	PCT
No. 2 Villanova †	16	–	2	.889	33	–	3	.917
No. 22 Georgetown	12	–	6	.667	22	–	11	.667
No. 24 Butler	12	–	6	.667	23	–	11	.676
Providence	11	–	7	.611	22	–	12	.647
St. John's	10	–	8	.556	21	–	12	.636
Xavier	9	–	9	.500	23	–	14	.622
DePaul	6	–	12	.333	12	–	20	.375
Seton Hall	6	–	12	.333	16	–	15	.516
Marquette	4	–	14	.222	13	–	19	.406
Creighton	4	–	14	.222	14	–	19	.424
† 2015 Big East tournament winner As of April 6, 2015; Rankings from AP poll

The 2014–15 Big East Conference men's basketball season began with practices in October 2014, followed by the start of the followed by the start of the 2014–15 NCAA Division I men's basketball season in November. This is the 36th year in the conference's history, but the second as a non-football conference, which officially formed on July 1, 2013. While the first game involving two conference members took place during the Battle 4 Atlantis, it did not count in the Big East standings; conference play officially began on New Year's Eve 2014. The season concluded in March with the 2015 Big East tournament at Madison Square Garden in New York City.

== Preseason ==
	Media
1.	Villanova (9)
2.	Georgetown (1)
3.	St. John's
4.	Xavier
5.	Providence
6.	Seton Hall
7t.	Butler
7t.	Marquette
9.	Creighton
10.	DePaul

() first place votes

=== Preseason All-Big East teams ===
Media
Kellen Dunham BUTLER
**D'Vauntes Smith-Rivera GEORGETOWN**
D'Angelo Harrison ST. JOHN'S
JayVaughn Pinkston VILLANOVA
Matt Stainbrook XAVIER
- Coaches select 8 players
- Players in bold are choices for Big East Player of the Year

== Rankings ==
Legend
Increase in ranking
Decrease in ranking
Not ranked previous week

		Pre	Wk 2	Wk 3	Wk 4	Wk 5	Wk 6	Wk 7	Wk 8	Wk 9	Wk 10	Wk 11	Wk 12	Wk 13	Wk 14	Wk 15	Wk 16	Wk 17	Wk 18	Wk 19	Final
Butler	AP				23	15	23	RV		RV	RV	RV	25	22	18	19	23	21	22	24	23
Butler	Coaches				RV	19	25	RV		RV	RV	RV	RV	22	18	19	23	21	22	23	
Creighton	AP			23	RV	RV															
Creighton	C			RV	RV	RV															
DePaul	AP																				
DePaul	C																				
Georgetown	AP	RV	RV	RV	RV	RV	RV	RV	25	RV	RV	RV	21	24	RV	RV	RV	RV	23	22	RV
Georgetown	C	RV	RV	RV	RV	RV	RV	RV	RV	RV	RV	RV	22	24	RV	RV	RV	RV	23	24	
Marquette	AP																				
Marquette	C																				
Providence	AP			RV	RV						RV	RV	RV	RV	RV	RV	25	24	RV	RV	RV
Providence	C	RV		25	RV	RV					RV	RV	RV	RV	RV	RV	RV	23	RV	RV	
Seton Hall	AP				RV	RV	RV	RV		19	21	24	RV	RV							
Seton Hall	C					RV	RV	RV	RV	19	21	24		RV							
St. John's	AP				RV	24	20	17	15	24	RV	RV						RV	RV		
St. John's	C				RV	RV	23	19	17	24	RV	RV						RV			
Villanova	AP	12	12	12	10	7	7	7	6	8	5	4	7	7	6	6	6	4	4	2	9
Villanova	C	12	12	11	9	7	7	7	5	8	5	4	7	7	6	6	6	4	3	2	
Xavier	AP			RV						RV				RV	RV					RV	22
Xavier	C																			RV	

== Regular season ==
This table summarizes the head-to-head results between teams in conference play.

	Butler	Creighton	DePaul	Georgetown	Marquette	Providence	Seton Hall	St. John's	Villanova	Xavier
vs. Butler	–	0–2	0–2	2-0	0–2	1–1	0–2	0–2	2–0	1–1
vs. Creighton	2–0	–	1–1	2–0	1–1	2–0	2–0	1–1	2–0	1–1
vs. DePaul	2–0	1–1	–	2–0	1–1	2–0	0–2	1–1	2–0	1–1
vs. Georgetown	0–2	0–2	0–2	–	0–2	2–0	0–2	1–1	1–1	2–0
vs. Marquette	2–0	1–1	1–1	2–0	–	1–1	1–1	2–0	2–0	2–0
vs. Providence	1–1	0–2	0–2	0–2	1–1	–	0–2	2–0	2–0	1–1
vs. Seton Hall	2–0	0–2	2–0	2–0	1–1	2–0	–	1–1	1–1	1–1
vs. St. John's	2–0	1–1	1–1	1–1	0–2	0–2	1–1	–	2–0	0–2
vs. Villanova	0–2	0–2	0–2	1–1	0–2	0–2	1–1	0–2	–	0–2
vs. Xavier	1–1	1–1	1–1	0–2	0–2	1–1	1–1	2–0	2–0	–
Total	12–6	4–14	6–12	12–6	4–14	11–7	6–12	10–8	16–2	9–9

== Honors and awards ==
=== All-Big East awards and teams ===
==== Coaches ====
**2015 Big East Men's Basketball Individual Awards**
Award	Recipient(s)
Player of the Year	**Ryan Arcidiacono**, G., Villanova; **Kris Dunn**, G., Providence
Coach of the Year	**Jay Wright**, Villanova
Defensive Player of the Year	**Kris Dunn**, G., Providence; **Sir'Dominic Pointer**, G/F., St. John's
Sixth Man Award	**Josh Hart**, G., Villanova
Most Improved Player the Year	**Sir'Dominic Pointer**, G/F., St. John's
Freshman of the Year	**Angel Delgado**, F., Seton Hall

**2015 Big East Men's Basketball All–Conference Teams**
† First Team	Second Team	Honorable Mention	All–Rookie Team
Kellen Dunham, Sr., G., Butler; D'Vauntes Smith-Rivera, Jr., G., Georgetown ‡ Kris Dunn, So., G., Providence ‡ LaDontae Henton, Sr., F., Providence; D'Angelo Harrison, Sr., G., St. John's; Ryan Arcidiacono, Jr., G., Villanova ‡ Darrun Hilliard, Sr., G., Villanova	Roosevelt Jones, Jr., F., Butler; Matt Carlino, Sr., G., Marquette; Sterling Gibbs, Jr., G., Seton Hall; Sir'Dominic Pointer, Sr., G/F., St. John's; Matt Stainbrook, Sr., C., Xavier	Billy Garrett Jr., So., G., DePaul; Daniel Ochefu, Jr., F., Villanova; JayVaughn Pinkston, Sr., F., Villanova	Isaac Copeland, Fr., F., Georgetown; L. J. Peak, Fr., F., Georgetown; Duane Wilson, Fr., G., Marquette ‡ Angel Delgado, Fr., F., Seton Hall; Isaiah Whitehead, Fr., G., Seton Hall ‡ Trevon Bluiett, Fr., F., Xavier
‡ – Denotes unanimous selection. † – Due to a tie in the voting, additional positions was named.

== Postseason ==
=== Big East tournament ===
- March 11–14, 2015 Big East Conference Basketball Tournament, Madison Square Garden, New York City.

**2015 Big East men's basketball tournament seeds and results**
Seed	School	Conf.	Over.	Tiebreaker	First round March 11	Quarterfinals March 12	Semifinals March 13	Championship March 14
1.	‡† Villanova	16–2	32–2		Bye	#9 Marquette	#4 Providence	#6 Xavier
2.	† Georgetown	12–6	21–10	2–0 vs. Butler	Bye	#10 Creighton	#6 Xavier	
3.	† Butler	12–6	22–10	0–2 vs. Georgetown	Bye	#6 Xavier		
4.	† Providence	11–7	22–11		Bye	#5 St. John's	#1 Villanova	
5.	† St. John's	10–8	21–11		Bye	#4 Providence		
6.	† Xavier	9–9	21–13		Bye	#3 Butler	#2 Georgetown	#1 Villanova
7.	DePaul	6–12	12–20	2–0 vs. Seton Hall	#10 Creighton			
8.	Seton Hall	6–12	16–15	0–2 vs. DePaul	#9 Marquette			
9.	Marquette	4–14	13–15	1–1 vs. Providence	#8 Seton Hall	#1 Villanova		
10.	Creighton	4–14	14–19	0–2 vs. Providence	#7 DePaul	#2 Georgetown		
‡ – Big East regular season champions, and tournament No. 1 seed. † – Received a single-bye in the conference tournament. Overall records include all games played in the Big East tournament.

== Bracket ==
**First Round**; Wednesday, March 11
8	Seton Hall	56
9	**Marquette**	**78**
7	DePaul	63
10	**Creighton**	**78**

**Quarterfinals**; Thursday, March 12
1	**Villanova**	**84**
9	Marquette	49
4	**Providence**	**74**
5	St. John's	57
2	**Georgetown**	**60**
10	Creighton	55
3	Butler	61
6	**Xavier**	**67***

**Semifinals**; Friday, March 13
1	**Villanova**	**63**
4	Providence	61
2	Georgetown	63
6	**Xavier**	**65**

**Championship**; Saturday, March 14
1	**Villanova**	**69**
6	Xavier	52

* denotes overtime game

=== NCAA tournament ===
Seed	Region	School	Second round	Third round	Sweet 16	Elite Eight	Final Four	Championship
1	East	**Villanova**	#16 Lafayette - **March 19, Pittsburgh - W, 93–52**	#8 NC State - **March 21, Pittsburgh - L, 68–71**				
4	South	**Georgetown**	#13 Eastern Washington - **March 19, Portland - W, 84–74**	#5 Utah - **March 21, Portland - L, 64–75**				
6	East	**Providence**	#11 Dayton - **March 22, Columbus - L, 53–66**					
6	Midwest	**Butler**	#11 Texas - **March 19, Pittsburgh - W, 56–48**	#3 Notre Dame - **March 21, Pittsburgh - L, *64–67**				
6	West	**Xavier**	#11 Ole Miss - **March 19, Jacksonville - W, 76–57**	#14 Georgia State - **March 21, Jacksonville - W, 75–67**	#2 Arizona - **March 26, Los Angeles - L, 60–68**			
9	South	**St. John's**	#8 San Diego State - **March 20, Charlotte - L, 64–76**					
	**6 Bids**	W-L (%):	4–2 .667	1–3 .250	0–1 .000	0–0 –	0–0 –	TOTAL: 5–6 .455

* denotes overtime game
