= 2014–15 Marquette Golden Eagles men's basketball team =

American college basketball season

2014–15 Marquette Golden Eagles men's basketball
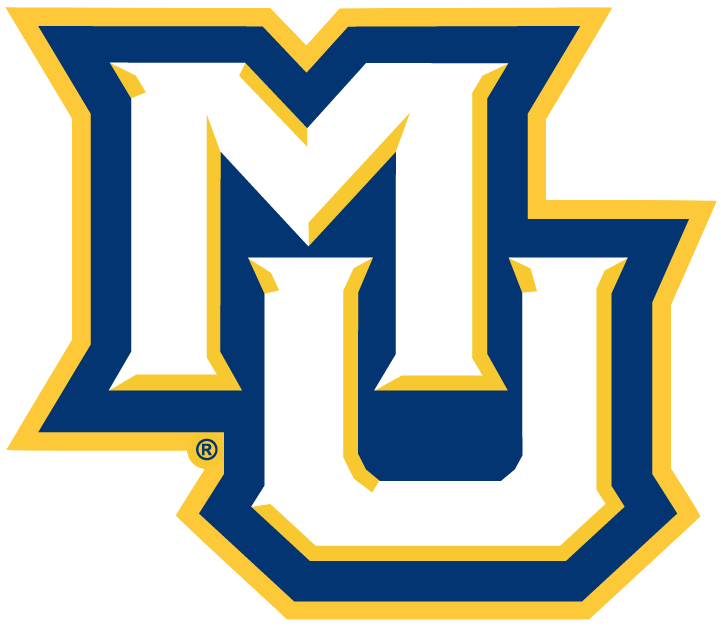
- Conference: Big East Conference|Big East
- Record: 13–19 (4–14 Big East)
- Head coach: Steve Wojciechowski (1st season)
- Assistant coaches: Chris Carrawell (1st season); Brett Nelson (1st season); Mark Phelps (1st season)
- Home arena: BMO Harris Bradley Center

2014–15 Big East men's basketball standings
	Conf.				Overall
Team	W		L	PCT	W		L	PCT
No. 2 Villanova †	16	–	2	.889	33	–	3	.917
No. 22 Georgetown	12	–	6	.667	22	–	11	.667
No. 24 Butler	12	–	6	.667	23	–	11	.676
Providence	11	–	7	.611	22	–	12	.647
St. John's	10	–	8	.556	21	–	12	.636
Xavier	9	–	9	.500	23	–	14	.622
DePaul	6	–	12	.333	12	–	20	.375
Seton Hall	6	–	12	.333	16	–	15	.516
Marquette	4	–	14	.222	13	–	19	.406
Creighton	4	–	14	.222	14	–	19	.424
† 2015 Big East tournament winner As of April 6, 2015; Rankings from AP poll

The 2014–15 Marquette Golden Eagles men's basketball team represented Marquette University in the 2014–15 NCAA Division I men's basketball season. Their coach was Steve Wojciechowski, serving in his first year as head coach. Marquette played its home games at the BMO Harris Bradley Center in Milwaukee, Wisconsin. Marquette was a member of the Big East Conference. They finished the season 13–19, 4–14 in Big East play to finish in a tie for ninth place. They advanced to the quarterfinals of the Big East tournament where they lost to Villanova.

== Preseason ==
=== Recruits ===
College recruiting
Name	Hometown	School	Height	Weight	Commit date
Sandy Cohen; SF	Seymour, WI	Seymour High School	6 ft 5 in (1.96 m)	175 lb (79 kg)	Jul 27, 2013
Sandy Cohen; SF	Recruit ratings: Scout: Rivals: 247Sports: (83)				
Overall recruit ranking:
Note: In many cases, Scout, Rivals, 247Sports, On3, and ESPN may conflict in their listings of height and weight.; In these cases, the average was taken. ESPN grades are on a 100-point scale.; Sources: "2014 Team Ranking". Rivals.

=== Transfer addition ===
Name	Pos.	Height	Weight	Year	Hometown	Notes
Matt Carlino	G	6'2"	175	Grad	Arcadia, Arizona	graduate transfer from BYU (1 yr immediate eligibility)
Wally Ellenson	G	6'6"	210	Junior	Rice Lake, Wisconsin	transfer from Minnesota (2 yrs eligibility remaining)
Luke Fischer	C	6'11"	245	Sophomore	Germantown, Wisconsin	transfer from Indiana (3 yrs eligibility remaining)
Gabe Levin	F	6'7"	230	Sophomore	Oak Park, Illinois	transfer from Loyola Marymount (3 yrs eligibility remaining)

=== Departures ===
Name	Number	Position	Height	Weight	Year	Hometown	Notes
Davante Gardner	54	F	6-8	290	Senior	Suffolk, Virginia	Graduated
Todd Mayo	4	G	6-3	195	Junior	Huntington, West Virginia	Left to pursue pro career
Chris Otule	42	C	6-11	275	Senior	Richmond, Texas	Graduated
Jake Thomas	23	G	6-3	205	Senior	Racine, Wisconsin	Graduated
Jamil Wilson	0	F	6-7	230	Senior	Racine, Wisconsin	Graduated
Gabe Levin	32	F	6-7	230	Sophomore	Oak Park, Illinois	Left Team in Preseason (Long Beach State)
Deonte Burton	30	F	6-4	240	Sophomore	Milwaukee, Wisconsin	Left Team at Semester (Iowa State)

== Roster ==
2014–15 Marquette Golden Eagles men's basketball team
Players
Coaches

Pos.	#	Name	Height	Weight	Year	Hometown
G	1	Duane Wilson	6 ft 2 in (1.88 m)	185 lb (84 kg)	RS Fr	Milwaukee, Wisconsin
G	2	John Dawson	6 ft 2 in (1.88 m)	205 lb (93 kg)	So	Clovis, New Mexico
F	5	Sandy Cohen III	6 ft 6 in (1.98 m)	180 lb (82 kg)	Fr	Seymour, Wisconsin
F	10	Juan Anderson	6 ft 6 in (1.98 m)	215 lb (98 kg)	Sr	Oakland, California
G	12	Derrick Wilson	6 ft 1 in (1.85 m)	210 lb (95 kg)	Sr	Anchorage, Alaska
G	13	Matt Carlino	6 ft 2 in (1.88 m)	175 lb (79 kg)	GS	Arcadia, Arizona
G	22	Wally Ellenson (I)	6 ft 6 in (1.98 m)	210 lb (95 kg)	Jr	Rice Lake, Wisconsin
G	23	JaJuan Johnson	6 ft 5 in (1.96 m)	200 lb (91 kg)	So	Memphis, Tennessee
F	25	Steve Taylor, Jr.	6 ft 7 in (2.01 m)	240 lb (109 kg)	Jr	Chicago, Illinois
C	40	Luke Fischer (I)	6 ft 11 in (2.11 m)	245 lb (111 kg)	So	Germantown, Wisconsin

Head coach

- Steve Wojciechowski (Duke)

Assistant coach(es)

- Chris Carrawell (Duke)
- Brett Nelson (Florida)
- Mark Phelps (Old Dominion)

Legend

- (C) Team captain
- (S) Suspended
- (I) Ineligible
- (W) Walk-on
- Injured
- Current redshirt

Roster
Last update: 6 August 2014

== Schedule ==
Date time, TV	Opponent	Result	Record	Site (attendance) city, state
Exhibition
November 8*; 1:00 pm	Wisconsin Lutheran	W 115–47		BMO Harris Bradley Center (12,160); Milwaukee, WI
Non-conference regular season
November 14*; 8:30 pm, FSN	Tennessee–Martin	W 79–63	1–0	BMO Harris Bradley Center (12,901); Milwaukee, WI
November 18*; 6:30 pm, ESPN2	at No. 20 Ohio State	L 63–74	1–1	Value City Arena (13,233); Columbus, OH
November 22*; 1:30 pm, FS2	Omaha	L 89–97	1–2	BMO Harris Bradley Center (12,575); Milwaukee, WI
November 24*; 8:00 pm, FS1	NJIT	W 62–57	2–2	BMO Harris Bradley Center (11,966); Milwaukee, WI
November 27*; 7:50 pm, ESPN2	vs. Georgia Tech; Orlando Classic quarterfinals	W 72–70	3–2	HP Field House (3,216); Lake Buena Vista, FL
November 28*; 8:00 pm, ESPN2	vs. No. 20 Michigan State; Orlando Classic Championship round	L 68–79	3–3	HP Field House (3,449); Lake Buena Vista, FL
November 30*; 3:00 pm, ESPN2	vs. Tennessee; Orlando Classic 3rd place game	W 67–59	4–3	HP Field House (4,842); Lake Buena Vista, FL
December 6*; 11:30 am, CBS	No. 2 Wisconsin; Rivalry	L 38–49	4–4	BMO Harris Bradley Center (18,573); Milwaukee, WI
December 16*; 8:00 pm, FS1	Arizona State	W 78–71	5–4	BMO Harris Bradley Center (12,736); Milwaukee, WI
December 19*; 8:00 pm, FS1	Alabama A&M	W 83-49	6-4	Al McGuire Center (3,080); Milwaukee, WI
December 22*; 8:00 pm, FS2	North Dakota	W 67–54	7–4	BMO Harris Bradley Center (12,536); Milwaukee, WI
December 28*; 1:00 pm, FS1	Morgan State	W 81–53	8–4	BMO Harris Bradley Center (12,701); Milwaukee, WI
Big East Conference play
December 31; 4:00 pm, FS1	at DePaul	L 58–61	8–5 (0–1)	Allstate Arena (8,089); Rosemont, IL
January 3; 1:00 pm, FSN	Providence	W 75–66	9–5 (1–1)	BMO Harris Bradley Center (15,134); Milwaukee, WI
January 6; 6:00 pm, FS1	at Georgetown	L 59–65	9–6 (1–2)	Verizon Center (8,762); Washington, D.C.
January 14; 8:00 pm, CBSSN	Creighton	W 53–52	10–6 (2–2)	BMO Harris Bradley Center (13,069); Milwaukee, WI
January 17; 11:00 am, FSN	at Xavier	L 58–62	10–7 (2–3)	Cintas Center (10,372); Cincinnati, OH
January 21; 6:00 pm, FS1	at St. John's	L 57–60	10–8 (2–4)	Madison Square Garden (7,532); New York, NY
January 24; 1:35 pm, FS1	Georgetown	L 85–95 ^{OT}	10–9 (2–5)	BMO Harris Bradley Center (15,713); Milwaukee, WI
January 28; 6:00 pm, FS1	Seton Hall	L 70–80	10–10 (2–6)	BMO Harris Bradley Center (14,917); Milwaukee, WI
January 31; 1:00 pm, FSN	No. 25 Butler	L 68–72 ^{OT}	10–11 (2–7)	BMO Harris Bradley Center (15,342); Milwaukee, WI
February 4; 6:00 pm, FS1	at No. 7 Villanova	L 52–70	10–12 (2–8)	Wells Fargo Center (13,313); Philadelphia, PA
February 7; 11:00 am, CBSSN	at Seton Hall	W 57–54	11–12 (3–8)	Prudential Center (8,566); Newark, NJ
February 10; 8:15 pm, FS1	Xavier	L 44–64	11–13 (3–9)	BMO Harris Bradley Center (12,833); Milwaukee, WI
February 14; 12:00 pm, FS1	at Creighton	L 70–77	11–14 (3–10)	CenturyLink Center (17,248); Omaha, NE
February 21; 1:00 pm, FOX	No. 6 Villanova	L 76–87	11–15 (3–11)	BMO Harris Bradley Center (17,961); Milwaukee, WI
February 25; 7:00 pm, FS1	at No. 23 Butler	L 52–73	11–16 (3–12)	Hinkle Fieldhouse (7,830); Indianapolis, IN
March 1; 2:30 pm, FS1	at No. 25 Providence	L 66–77	11–17 (3–13)	Dunkin Donuts Center (12,568); Providence, RI
March 4; 8:15 pm, FS1	St. John's	L 51–67	11–18 (3–14)	BMO Harris Bradley Center (14,201); Milwaukee, WI
March 7; 1:00 pm, FS1	DePaul	W 58–48	12–18 (4–14)	BMO Harris Bradley Center (15,923); Milwaukee, WI
Big East tournament
March 11; 6:00 pm, FS1	vs. Seton Hall; First round	W 78–56	13–18	Madison Square Garden (12,588); New York, NY
March 12; 11:00 am, FS1	vs. No. 4 Villanova; Quarterfinals	L 49–84	13–19	Madison Square Garden (15,197); New York, NY
*Non-conference game. ^{#}Rankings from AP Poll. (#) Tournament seedings in parentheses. All times are in Central Time.

== Rankings ==
Ranking movement Legend: ██ Improvement in ranking. ██ Decrease in ranking. ██NR = Not ranked. RV = Receiving votes.
Poll	Pre- season	Week 2	Week 3	Week 4	Week 5	Week 6	Week 7	Week 8	Week 9	Week 10	Week 11	Week 12	Week 13	Week 14	Week 15	Week 16	Week 17	Week 18	Final
AP	NR	NR	NR	NR	NR	NR	NR	NR	NR	NR	NR	NR	NR	NR	NR	NR	NR	NR	
Coaches	NR	NR	NR	NR	NR	NR	NR	NR	NR	NR	NR	NR	NR	NR	NR	NR	NR	NR	
