= 2014–15 Villanova Wildcats men's basketball team =

American college basketball season

2014–15 Villanova Wildcats men's basketball

Big East tournament champions Big East regular season champions Philadelphia Big 5 champions Legends Classic champions

NCAA tournament, round of 32
- Conference: Big East Conference

Ranking
- Coaches: No. 9
- AP: No. 2
- Record: 33–3 (16–2 Big East)
- Head coach: Jay Wright (14th season)
- Assistant coaches: Baker Dunleavy; Ashley Howard; Kyle Neptune
- Home arena: The Pavilion; Wells Fargo Center (6 Games)

2014–15 Big East men's basketball standings
	Conf.				Overall
Team	W		L	PCT	W		L	PCT
No. 2 Villanova †	16	–	2	.889	33	–	3	.917
No. 22 Georgetown	12	–	6	.667	22	–	11	.667
No. 24 Butler	12	–	6	.667	23	–	11	.676
Providence	11	–	7	.611	22	–	12	.647
St. John's	10	–	8	.556	21	–	12	.636
Xavier	9	–	9	.500	23	–	14	.622
DePaul	6	–	12	.333	12	–	20	.375
Seton Hall	6	–	12	.333	16	–	15	.516
Marquette	4	–	14	.222	13	–	19	.406
Creighton	4	–	14	.222	14	–	19	.424
† 2015 Big East tournament winner As of April 6, 2015; Rankings from AP poll

The 2014–15 Villanova Wildcats men's basketball team represented Villanova University in the 2014–15 NCAA Division I men's basketball season. Led by head coach Jay Wright in his 14th season, the Wildcats participated as members of the Big East Conference and played their home games at The Pavilion, with some select home games at the Wells Fargo Center in Philadelphia, Pennsylvania. They finished the season 33–3, 16–2 in Big East play to win the Big East regular season championship. They defeated Marquette, Providence, and Xavier to win the Big East tournament. As a result, they received the conference's automatic bid to the NCAA tournament as the No. 1 seed in the East Region. They defeated Lafayette in the Second Round before being upset in the Third Round by NC State. The Wildcats set a single-season school record for wins with 33.

== Previous season ==
The 2013–14 Villanova Wildcats finished the season with an overall record of 29–5, with a record of 16–2 in the Big East regular season to capture their Big East regular season title. In the 2014 Big East tournament, the Wildcats were upset by Seton Hall, 64–63 in the quarterfinals. They were invited to the 2014 NCAA Division I men's basketball tournament which they defeated Milwaukee in the second round before getting eliminated by eventual NCAA Tournament Champion Connecticut in the third round.

== Offseason ==
=== Departures ===
Name	Number	Pos.	Height	Weight	Year	Hometown	Notes
Tony Chennault	5	G	6'2"	195	Senior	Philadelphia, PA	Graduated
Nick McMahon	12	G	6'0"	165	Senior	Colts Neck, NJ	Graduated
James Bell	32	G	6'6"	220	Senior	Orlando, FL	Graduated

=== Incoming recruits ===
College recruiting information
Name	Hometown	School	Height	Weight	Commit date
Mikal Bridges; SF	Malvern, PA	Great Valley High School	6 ft 7 in (2.01 m)	180 lb (82 kg)	Jun 25, 2013
Mikal Bridges; SF	Recruit ratings: Scout: Rivals: (83)				
Phil Booth; PG	Baltimore, MD	Mount St. Joseph High School	6 ft 2 in (1.88 m)	170 lb (77 kg)	Jul 30, 2013
Phil Booth; PG	Recruit ratings: Scout: Rivals: (81)				
Overall recruit ranking:
Note: In many cases, Scout, Rivals, 247Sports, On3, and ESPN may conflict in their listings of height and weight.; In these cases, the average was taken. ESPN grades are on a 100-point scale.; Sources: "2014 Team Ranking". Rivals.

== Roster ==
2014–15 Villanova Wildcats men's basketball team
Players
Coaches

Pos.	#	Name	Height	Weight	Year	Hometown
G	0	Henry Lowe (W)	5 ft 11 in (1.8 m)	185 lb (84 kg)	Jr	New York, New York
F	2	Kris Jenkins	6 ft 6 in (1.98 m)	240 lb (109 kg)	So	Upper Marlboro, Maryland
G	3	Josh Hart	6 ft 5 in (1.96 m)	205 lb (93 kg)	So	Washington, D.C.
G	4	Darrun Hilliard	6 ft 6 in (1.98 m)	215 lb (98 kg)	Sr	Bethlehem, Pennsylvania
G	5	Phil Booth	6 ft 3 in (1.91 m)	185 lb (84 kg)	Fr	Baltimore, Maryland
F	14	Darryl Reynolds	6 ft 8 in (2.03 m)	225 lb (102 kg)	So	Philadelphia, Pennsylvania
G	15	Ryan Arcidiacono	6 ft 3 in (1.91 m)	195 lb (88 kg)	Jr	Langhorne, Pennsylvania
F	20	Patrick Farrell (W)	6 ft 5 in (1.96 m)	200 lb (91 kg)	Jr	Rockville Centre, New York
F	22	JayVaughn Pinkston	6 ft 7 in (2.01 m)	235 lb (107 kg)	RS Sr	Brooklyn, New York
F	23	Daniel Ochefu	6 ft 11 in (2.11 m)	245 lb (111 kg)	Jr	Lagos, Nigeria
G/F	25	Mikal Bridges (RS)	6 ft 7 in (2.01 m)	191 lb (87 kg)	Fr	Malvern, Pennsylvania
G	31	Dylan Ennis	6 ft 2 in (1.88 m)	192 lb (87 kg)	RS Jr	Brampton, Ontario
F	52	Kevin Rafferty (W)	6 ft 8 in (2.03 m)	215 lb (98 kg)	Sr	Malvern, Pennsylvania

Head coach

- Jay Wright (Bucknell)

Assistant coach(es)

- Baker Dunleavy (Villanova)
- Ashley Howard (Drexel)
- Kyle Neptune (Lehigh)

Legend

- (C) Team captain
- (S) Suspended
- (I) Ineligible
- (W) Walk-on
- Injured
- Current redshirt

Roster

== Schedule and results ==
Date time, TV	Rank^{#}	Opponent^{#}	Result	Record	Site (attendance) city, state
Exhibition
11/04/2014*; 7:00 pm, FS1	No. 12	Northwood	W 93–50		The Pavilion (6,500); Villanova, PA
11/09/2014*; 12:00 pm	No. 12	Nyack	W 82–45		Wells Fargo Center (4,529); Philadelphia, PA
Non-conference regular season
11/14/2014*; 8:00 pm, FS2	No. 12	vs. Lehigh	W 77–66	1–0	PPL Center (8,751); Allentown, PA
11/17/2014*; 7:00 pm, FS1	No. 12	Maryland Eastern Shore; Legends Classic	W 81–44	2–0	The Pavilion (6,500); Villanova, PA
11/20/2014*; 8:00 pm, CBSSN	No. 12	Bucknell; Legends Classic	W 72–65	3–0	The Pavilion (6,500); Villanova, PA
11/24/2014*; 7:00 pm, ESPN2	No. 12	vs. No. 14 VCU; Legends Classic semifinals	W 77–53	4–0	Barclays Center (8,465); Brooklyn, NY
11/25/2014*; 10:00 pm, ESPN2	No. 12	vs. No. 19 Michigan; Legends Classic Championship	W 60–55	5–0	Barclays Center (8,093); Brooklyn, NY
11/30/2014*; 4:30 pm, FS1	No. 12	Delaware	W 78–47	6–0	Wells Fargo Center (11,289); Philadelphia, PA
12/03/2014*; 8:30 pm, CBSSN	No. 10	at La Salle	W 84–70	7–0	Tom Gola Arena (3,400); Philadelphia, PA
12/06/2014*; 1:00 pm, FS1	No. 10	Saint Joseph's	W 74–46	8-0	The Pavilion (6,500); Villanova, PA
12/09/2014*; 7:00 pm, ESPN	No. 7	vs. Illinois; Jimmy V Classic	W 73–59	9–0	Madison Square Garden (11,617); New York, NY
12/14/2014*; 2:00 pm, FS1	No. 7	Temple	W 82–65	10–0	The Pavilion (6,500); Villanova, PA
12/20/2014*; 1:00 pm, FOX	No. 7	Syracuse	W 82–77 ^{OT}	11–0	Wells Fargo Center (18,369); Philadelphia, PA
12/23/2014*; 7:00 pm, FS1	No. 7	NJIT	W 92–67	12–0	The Pavilion (6,500); Villanova, PA
Big East Conference Play
12/31/2014; 2:30 pm, FS1	No. 6	Butler	W 67–55	13–0 (1–0)	The Pavilion (6,500); Villanova, PA
01/03/2015; 12:00 pm, FS1	No. 6	at Seton Hall	L 61–66 ^{OT}	13–1 (1–1)	Prudential Center (10,701); Newark, NJ
01/06/2015; 9:00 pm, FS1	No. 8	at No. 24 St. John's	W 90–72	14–1 (2–1)	Madison Square Garden (8,565); New York, NY
01/10/2015; 4:00 pm, CBSSN	No. 8	DePaul	W 81–64	15–1 (3–1)	The Pavilion (6,500); Villanova, PA
01/14/2015; 9:00 pm, FS1	No. 5	Xavier	W 88–75	16–1 (4–1)	The Pavilion (6,500); Villanova, PA
01/17/2015*; 7:00 pm	No. 5	at Penn	W 62–47	17–1	Palestra (8,722); Philadelphia, PA
01/19/2015; 9:00 pm, FS1	No. 4	at Georgetown	L 58–78	17–2 (4–2)	Verizon Center (13,872); Washington, D.C.
01/25/2015; 7:00 pm, FS1	No. 4	Creighton	W 71–50	18–2 (5–2)	The Pavilion (6,500); Villanova, PA
01/31/2015; 2:00 pm, FS1	No. 7	at DePaul	W 68–55	19–2 (6–2)	Allstate Arena (7,532); Rosemont, IL
02/04/2015; 7:00 pm, FS1	No. 7	Marquette	W 70–52	20–2 (7–2)	Wells Fargo Center (13,313); Philadelphia, PA
02/07/2015; 2:00 pm, FOX	No. 7	No. 24 Georgetown	W 69–53	21–2 (8–2)	Wells Fargo Center (20,587); Philadelphia, PA
02/11/2015; 8:00 pm, FS1	No. 6	at Providence	W 74–68	22–2 (9–2)	Dunkin' Donuts Center (12,410); Providence, RI
02/14/2015; 6:00 pm, CBSSN	No. 6	at No. 18 Butler	W 68–65	23–2 (10–2)	Hinkle Fieldhouse (9,231); Indianapolis, IN
02/16/2015; 7:00 pm, FS1	No. 6	Seton Hall	W 80–54	24–2 (11–2)	The Pavilion (6,500); Villanova, PA
02/21/2015; 2:00 pm, FOX	No. 6	at Marquette	W 87–76	25–2 (12–2)	BMO Harris Bradley Center (17,961); Milwaukee, WI
02/24/2015; 7:00 pm, FS1	No. 6	No. 25 Providence	W 89–61	26–2 (13–2)	The Pavilion (6,500); Villanova, PA
02/28/2015; 2:00 pm, FOX	No. 6	at Xavier	W 78–66	27–2 (14–2)	Cintas Center (10,250); Cincinnati, OH
03/03/2015; 9:15 pm, FS1	No. 4	at Creighton	W 76–72	28–2 (15–2)	CenturyLink Center (16,337); Omaha, NE
03/07/2015; 12:00 noon, FOX/FS1	No. 4	St. John's	W 105–68	29–2 (16–2)	Wells Fargo Center (19,161); Philadelphia, PA
Big East tournament
03/12/2015; 12:00 noon, FS1	No. 4	vs. Marquette; Quarterfinals	W 84–49	30–2	Madison Square Garden (15,197); New York, NY
03/13/2015; 7:00 pm, FS1	No. 4	vs. Providence; Semifinals	W 63–61	31–2	Madison Square Garden (15,194); New York, NY
03/14/2015; 8:00 pm, FS1	No. 4	vs. Xavier; Championship game	W 69–52	32–2	Madison Square Garden (13,471); New York, NY
NCAA tournament
3/19/2015*; 6:50 pm, TBS	No. 2 (1 E)	vs. (16 E) Lafayette; Second round	W 93–52	33–2	Consol Energy Center (16,170); Pittsburgh, PA
3/21/2015*; 7:10 pm, TBS	No. 2 (1 E)	vs. (8 E) NC State; Third round	L 68–71	33–3	Consol Energy Center (18,762); Pittsburgh, PA
*Non-conference game. ^{#}Rankings from AP Poll. (#) Tournament seedings in parentheses. All times are in Eastern Time. (#) during NCAA Tournament is seed with Region E=East.

== Rankings ==
Ranking movements Legend: ██ Increase in ranking ██ Decrease in ranking
	Week																			
Poll	Pre	1	2	3	4	5	6	7	8	9	10	11	12	13	14	15	16	17	18	Final
AP	12	12	12	10	7	7	7	6	8	5	4	7	7	6	6	6	4	4	2	Not released
Coaches	12	12	11	9	7	7	7	5	8	5	4	7	7	6	6	6	4	3	2	9

*AP does not release post-NCAA tournament rankings
