= List of Boston College Eagles men's basketball head coaches =

The following is a list of Boston College Eagles men's basketball head coaches. The Eagles have had 18 head coaches in their 93-season history.

Boston College's current head coach is Luke Murray. He was hired in March 2026, replacing Earl Grant, who served as the head coach from 2021 to 2026.

No.	Tenure	Coach	Years	Record	Pct.
1	1904–1905	Higgins	1	6–8	.429
2	1905–1907	James Crowley	2	9–21	.300
–	1910–1911	No coach	1	2–4	.333
3	1916–1917	Paul McNally	1	2–3	.400
4	1918–1921	Luke Urban	3	19–11	.633
5	1921–1925	William Coady	4	21–22	.488
6	1945–1953	Al McClellan	8	94–80	.540
7	1953–1962	Dino Martin	9	109–102	.517
–	1962–1963* (Note: Power served as interim coach for the 1962–63 season, with Bob Cousy planned to take over for the 1963–64 season.)	Frank Power	1	10–16	.385
8	1963–1969	Bob Cousy	6	114–38	.750
9	1969–1971	Chuck Daly	2	26–24	.520
10	1971–1977	Bob Zuffelato	6	83–80	.509
11	1977–1982	Tom Davis	5	100–47	.680
12	1982–1986	Gary Williams	4	76–45	.628
13	1986–1997	Jim O'Brien	11	168–166	.503
14	1997–2010	Al Skinner	13	247–165	.600
15	2010–2014	Steve Donahue	4	54–76	.415
16	2014–2021 (Note: Christian was fired as head coach on February 15, 2021. Scott Spinelli served as interim coach for the remainder of the season.)	Jim Christian	7	78–132	.371
–	2021*	Scott Spinelli	1	1–3	.250
17	2021–2026	Earl Grant	5	72–92	.439
18	2026–present	Luke Murray	1	0–0	–
Totals		18 coaches	93 seasons	1,291–1,135	.532
Records updated through end of 2025–26 season * - Denotes interim head coach. Source
