= List of Providence Friars men's basketball head coaches =

The following is a list of Providence Friars men's basketball head coaches. There have been 16 head coaches of the Friars in their 98-season history.

Providence's current head coach is Bryan Hodgson. He was hired as the Friars' head coach in 2026, replacing Kim English.

No.	Tenure	Coach	Years	Record	Pct.
1	1926–1927	Archie Golembeski	1	8–8	.500
2	1927–1938	Al McClellan	11	147–65	.693
3	1938–1943 (Note: Providence did not field a team during the 1943–44 season because of World War II.); 1944–1946	Ed Crotty	7	58–53	.523
4	1946–1949	Lawrence Drew	3	25–30	.455
5	1949–1955	Vin Cuddy	6	75–64	.540
6	1955–1969; 1981–1985	Joe Mullaney	18	319–164	.660
7	1969–1979	Dave Gavitt	10	209–84	.713
8	1979–1981	Gary Walters	2	21–34	.382
9	1985–1987	Rick Pitino	2	42–23	.646
10	1987–1988	Gordie Chiesa	1	11–17	.393
11	1988–1994	Rick Barnes	6	108–76	.587
12	1994–1998	Pete Gillen	4	72–53	.576
13	1998–2008	Tim Welsh	10	151–139	.521
14	2008–2011	Keno Davis	3	46–50	.479
15	2011–2023	Ed Cooley	12	242–153	.613
16	2023–2026	Kim English	3	48–52	.480
Totals		16 coaches	98 seasons	1,364–882	.607
Records updated through end of 2024–25 season
