= James Crowley =

James or Jim Crowley may refer to:

== Sportspeople ==
- James Crowley (athlete), American athlete and distance runner
- Jim Crowley (1902–1986), American football player and coach
- James Crowley (basketball coach) (1888–1935), coach of the Boston College Eagles men's basketball team
- Jim Crowley (jockey) (born 1978), British jockey
- Jim Crowley (basketball) (born 1970), head women's basketball coach at St. Bonaventure University

== Others ==
- Jim Crowley (artist), Australian artist in the Progressive Art Movement in Adelaide in the 1970s
- James Crowley (politician) (1880–1946), Irish nationalist, politician and veterinary surgeon
- James Crowley (police officer), Cambridge, Massachusetts police officer known for the Henry Louis Gates arrest controversy
- James Crowley (mathematician) (born 1949), American mathematician
- Jimmy Crowley (born 1950), traditional musician from County Cork, Ireland
