= List of Providence Friars men's basketball seasons =

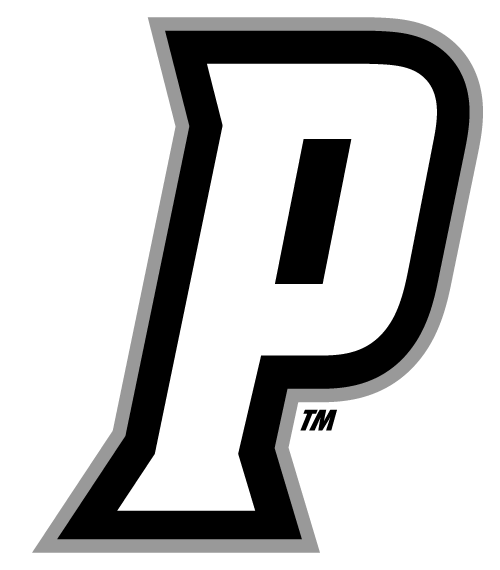

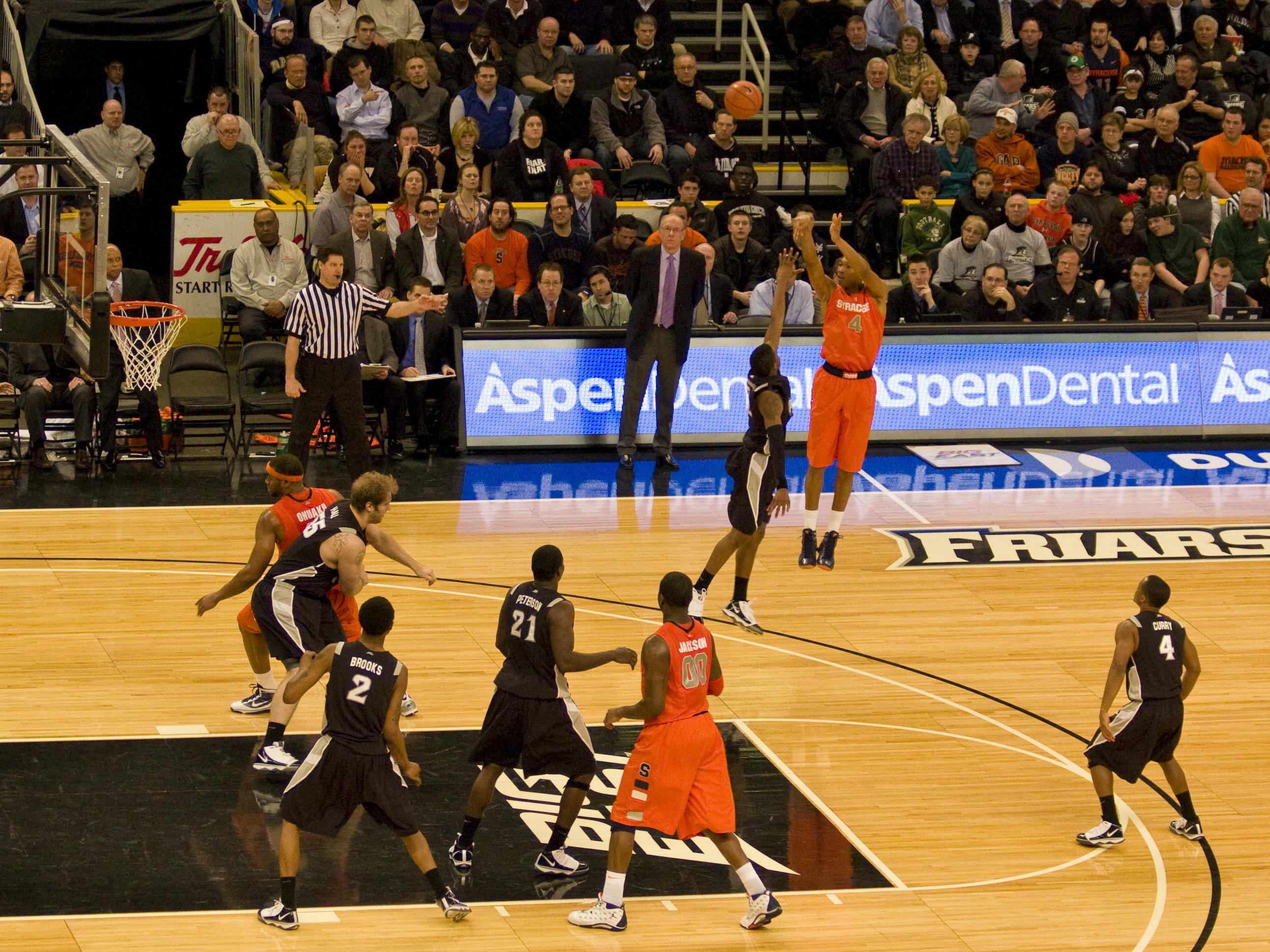
Syracuse vs. Providence in February 2010 at the Dunkin' Donuts Center in Providence, Rhode Island.

This is a list of the seasons completed by the Providence Friars men's basketball team.

Providence has fielded a men's college basketball team since 1926. The team played as an independent until 1979, when it became a charter member of the original Big East Conference. Providence was among seven schools to leave the original Big East in 2013 to become charter members of a new Big East Conference.^{[Note A]}

From 1975 to 1978, during four of the five seasons immediately preceding the formation of the original Big East Conference, Providence took part in the Eastern College Athletic Conference's regional Division I ECAC Men's Basketball Tournaments. Colleges and universities in the Northeastern United States played as independents during the regular season at the time and did not yet have access to a conventional conference tournament with an automatic bid to the NCAA Division I tournament, so each ECAC regional tournament filled that gap by giving its champion an automatic bid to the NCAA Division I tournament. Providence qualified for the ECAC New England Region Tournament in each season from 1975 to 1978, but never won the tournament championship. The Friars did not qualify for the ECAC Tournament in 1979.

Although Providence never won the regular-season championship in the original Big East Conference of 1979–2013, it won the tournament championship in 1994. In the new Big East Conference, it won the tournament championship in 2014 and the regular-season championship in the 2021–22 season.

Providence has appeared in the NCAA Tournament 22 times, reaching the Final Four in 1973 and 1987.

Providence has made 21 appearances in the National Invitation Tournament, winning it in 1961 and 1963. It has made one appearance in the NAIA tournament

== Seasons ==
Record table
Season	Coach	Overall	Conference	Standing	Postseason
Archie Golembeski (Independent) (1926–1927)
1926–27	Archie Golembeski	8–8			
Archie Golembeski:		8–8			
Al McClellan (Independent) (1927–1938)
1927–28	Al McClellan	7–9			
1928–29	Al McClellan	17–3			^{[Note B]}
1929–30	Al McClellan	15–4			^{[Note B]}
1930–31	Al McClellan	14–5			
1931–32	Al McClellan	19–5			^{[Note B]}
1932–33	Al McClellan	13–3			
1933–34	Al McClellan	12–5			
1934–35	Al McClellan	17–5			^{[Note B]}
1935–36	Al McClellan	14–7			
1936–37	Al McClellan	12–10			
1937–38	Al McClellan	7–9			
Al McClellan:		147–65			
Ed Crotty (Independent) (1938–1943)
1938–39	Ed Crotty	4–7			
1939–40	Ed Crotty	5–9			
1940–41	Ed Crotty	11–6			
1941–42	Ed Crotty	13–7			
1942–43	Ed Crotty	15–5			
Program suspended for World War II (1943–1944)
Ed Crotty (Independent) (1944–1946)
1944–45	Ed Crotty	5–7			
1945–46	Ed Crotty	5–12			
Ed Crotty:		58–53			
Lawrence Drew (Independent) (1946–1949)
1946–47	Lawrence Drew	8–11			
1947–48	Lawrence Drew	10–10			
1948–49	Lawrence Drew	7–9			
Lawrence Drew:		25–30			
Vin Cuddy (Independent) (1949–1955)
1949–50	Vin Cuddy	14–9			
1950–51	Vin Cuddy	14–10			NAIA First Round
1951–52	Vin Cuddy	14–9			
1952–53	Vin Cuddy	11–11			
1953–54	Vin Cuddy	13–13			
1954–55	Vin Cuddy	9–12			
Vin Cuddy:		75–64			
Joe Mullaney (Independent) (1955–1969)
1955–56	Joe Mullaney	14–8			
1956–57	Joe Mullaney	15–9			
1957–58	Joe Mullaney	18–6			
1958–59	Joe Mullaney	20–7			NIT Semifinals
1959–60	Joe Mullaney	24–5			NIT Runner-Up
1960–61	Joe Mullaney	24–5			NIT Champion
1961–62	Joe Mullaney	20–6			NIT First Round
1962–63	Joe Mullaney	24–4			NIT Champion
1963–64	Joe Mullaney	20–6			NCAA University Division First Round
1964–65	Joe Mullaney	24–2			NCAA University Division Elite Eight
1965–66	Joe Mullaney	22–5			NCAA University Division First Round
1966–67	Joe Mullaney	21–7			NIT Quarterfinals
1967–68	Joe Mullaney	11–14			
1968–69	Joe Mullaney	14–10			
Joe Mullaney (1955–69):		271–94			
Dave Gavitt (Independent) (1969–1979)
1969–70	Dave Gavitt	14–11			
1970–71	Dave Gavitt	20–8			NIT Quarterfinals
1971–72	Dave Gavitt	21–6			NCAA University Division First Round
1972–73	Dave Gavitt	27–4			NCAA University Division Fourth Place
1973–74	Dave Gavitt	28–4			NCAA Division I Sweet Sixteen
1974–75	Dave Gavitt	20–11	^{[Note C]}		NIT Runner-Up
1975–76	Dave Gavitt	21–11	^{[Note C]}		NIT Semifinals
1976–77	Dave Gavitt	24–5	^{[Note C]}		NCAA Division I First Round
1977–78	Dave Gavitt	24–8	^{[Note C]}		NCAA Division I First Round
1978–79	Dave Gavitt	10–16	^{[Note C]}		
Dave Gavitt:		209–84			
Gary Walters (Big East Conference (original)) (1979–1981)
1979–80	Gary Walters	11–16	0–6	7th	
1980–81	Gary Walters	10–18	3–11	8th	
Gary Walters:		21–34	3–17		
Joe Mullaney (Big East Conference (original)) (1981–1985)
1981–82	Joe Mullaney	10–17	2–12	T-7th	
1982–83	Joe Mullaney	12–19	4–12	8th	
1983–84	Joe Mullaney	15–14	5–11	T-7th	
1984–85	Joe Mullaney	11–20	3–13	8th	
Joe Mullaney (1981–85):		48–70	14–48		
Joe Mullaney (overall):		319–164	14–48		
Rick Pitino (Big East Conference (original)) (1985–1987)
1985–86	Rick Pitino	17–14	7–9	5th	NIT Quarterfinals
1986–87	Rick Pitino	25–9	10–6	T-4th	NCAA Division I Final Four
Rick Pitino:		42–23	17–15		
Gordie Chiesa (Big East Conference (original)) (1987–1988)
1987–88	Gordie Chiesa	11–17	5–11	8th	
Gordie Chiesa:		11–17	5–11		
Rick Barnes (Big East Conference (original)) (1988–1994)
1988–89	Rick Barnes	18–11	7–9	T-5th	NCAA Division I First Round
1989–90	Rick Barnes	17–12	8–8	T-5th	NCAA Division I First Round
1990–91	Rick Barnes	19–13	7–9	T-7th	NIT Quarterfinals
1991–92	Rick Barnes	14–17	6–12	9th	
1992–93	Rick Barnes	20–13	9–9	T-4th	NIT Semifinals
1993–94	Rick Barnes	20–10	10–8	T-4th	NCAA Division I First Round
Rick Barnes:		108–76	47–55		
Pete Gillen (Big East Conference (original)) (1994–1998)
1994–95	Pete Gillen	17–13	7–11	T-6th	NIT Second Round
1995–96	Pete Gillen	18–12	9–9	3rd (BE7)^{[Note D]}	NIT Second Round
1996–97	Pete Gillen	24–12	10–8	T-2nd (BE7)^{[Note D]}	NCAA Division I Elite Eight
1997–98	Pete Gillen	13–16	7–11	4th (BE7)^{[Note D]}	
Pete Gillen:		72–53	33–39		
Tim Welsh (Big East Conference (original)) (1998–2008)
1998–99	Tim Welsh	16–14	9–9	T-6th	NIT First Round
1999–2000	Tim Welsh	11–19	4–12	12th	
2000–01	Tim Welsh	21–10	11–5	2nd (East)^{[Note E]}	NCAA Division I First Round
2001–02	Tim Welsh	15–16	6–10	6th (East)^{[Note E]}	
2002–03	Tim Welsh	18–14	8–8	T-3rd (East)^{[Note E]}	NIT Second Round
2003–04	Tim Welsh	20–9	11–5	T-3rd	NCAA Division I First Round
2004–05	Tim Welsh	14–17	4–12	T-8th	
2005–06	Tim Welsh	12–15	5–11	T-13th	
2006–07	Tim Welsh	18–13	8–8	9th	NIT First Round
2007–08	Tim Welsh	6–12	15–16	T-12th	
Tim Welsh:		151–139	81–96		
Keno Davis (Big East Conference (original)) (2008–2011)
2008–09	Keno Davis	19–14	10–8	T-7th	NIT First Round
2009–10	Keno Davis	12–19	4–14	15th	
2010–11	Keno Davis	15–17	4–14	14th	
Keno Davis:		46–50	18–36		
Ed Cooley (Big East Conference (original)) (2011–2013)
2011–12	Ed Cooley	15–17	4–14	13th	
2012–13	Ed Cooley	19–15	9–9	T-9th	NIT Quarterfinals
Ed Cooley (Big East Conference) (2013–2023)
2013–14	Ed Cooley	23–12	10–8	T-3rd	NCAA Division I First Round
2014–15	Ed Cooley	22–12	11–7	4th	NCAA Division I First Round
2015–16	Ed Cooley	24–11	10–8	T-4th	NCAA Division I Second Round
2016–17	Ed Cooley	20–13	10–8	T-3rd	NCAA Division I First Four
2017–18	Ed Cooley	21–14	10–8	T-3rd	NCAA Division I First Round
2018–19	Ed Cooley	18–16	7–11	T-8th	NIT First Round
2019–20	Ed Cooley	19–12	12–6	4th	Postseason cancelled^{[Note F]}
2020–21	Ed Cooley	13–13	9–10	6th	
2021–22	Ed Cooley	27–6	14–3	1st	NCAA Division I Sweet Sixteen
2022–23	Ed Cooley	21–12	13–7	T-4th	NCAA Division I First Round
Ed Cooley:		242–153	119–99		
Kim English (Big East Conference) (2023–2026)
2023–24	Kim English	21–14	10–10	T-6th	NIT First Round
2024–25	Kim English	12–20	6–14	T-8th	
2025–26	Kim English	15–18	7–13	T-7th	
Kim English:		48–52	23–37		
Total:		1,379–900			
National champion Postseason invitational champion Conference regular season champion Conference regular season and conference tournament champion Division regular season champion Division regular season and conference tournament champion Conference tournament champion

== Notes ==
^A. After Providence and six other schools left the original Big East Conference to form a new Big East Conference in 2013, the original Big East Conference became the American Athletic Conference, marketed as "The American."
^B. Providence was deemed the New England champion in 1929, 1930, 1932, and 1935.
^C. Although an independent at the time, Providence participated from 1975 to 1978 in the end-of-season ECAC tournaments organized by the Eastern College Athletic Conference (a loosely organized sports federation of Eastern colleges and universities) for ECAC members which otherwise had no access to an automatic bid to the NCAA Division I tournament. Each of these regional tournaments gave its winner an automatic bid to that year's NCAA tournament in the same manner as conference tournaments of conventional conferences. Providence played in the ECAC New England Region Tournament in each of these four seasons, but never won an ECAC tournament championship. Providence did not qualify for the ECAC Tournament in 1979.
^D. From the 1995–1996 through 1997–1998 seasons, the original Big East Conference was divided into the Big East 6 and Big East 7 divisions. Providence played in the Big East 7 Division during all three seasons.
^E. From the 2000–2001 through 2002–2003 seasons, the original Big East Conference was divided into the East and West divisions. Providence played in the East Division during all three seasons.
^F. The 2020 Big East men's basketball tournament was cancelled after the first round due to the COVID-19 pandemic. Providence had a first-round bye and therefore did not play in the tournament. The 2020 NCAA Division I Men's Basketball Tournament and 2020 National Invitation Tournament also were cancelled due to the pandemic.
