= Doris Cole =

American architect (born 1938)

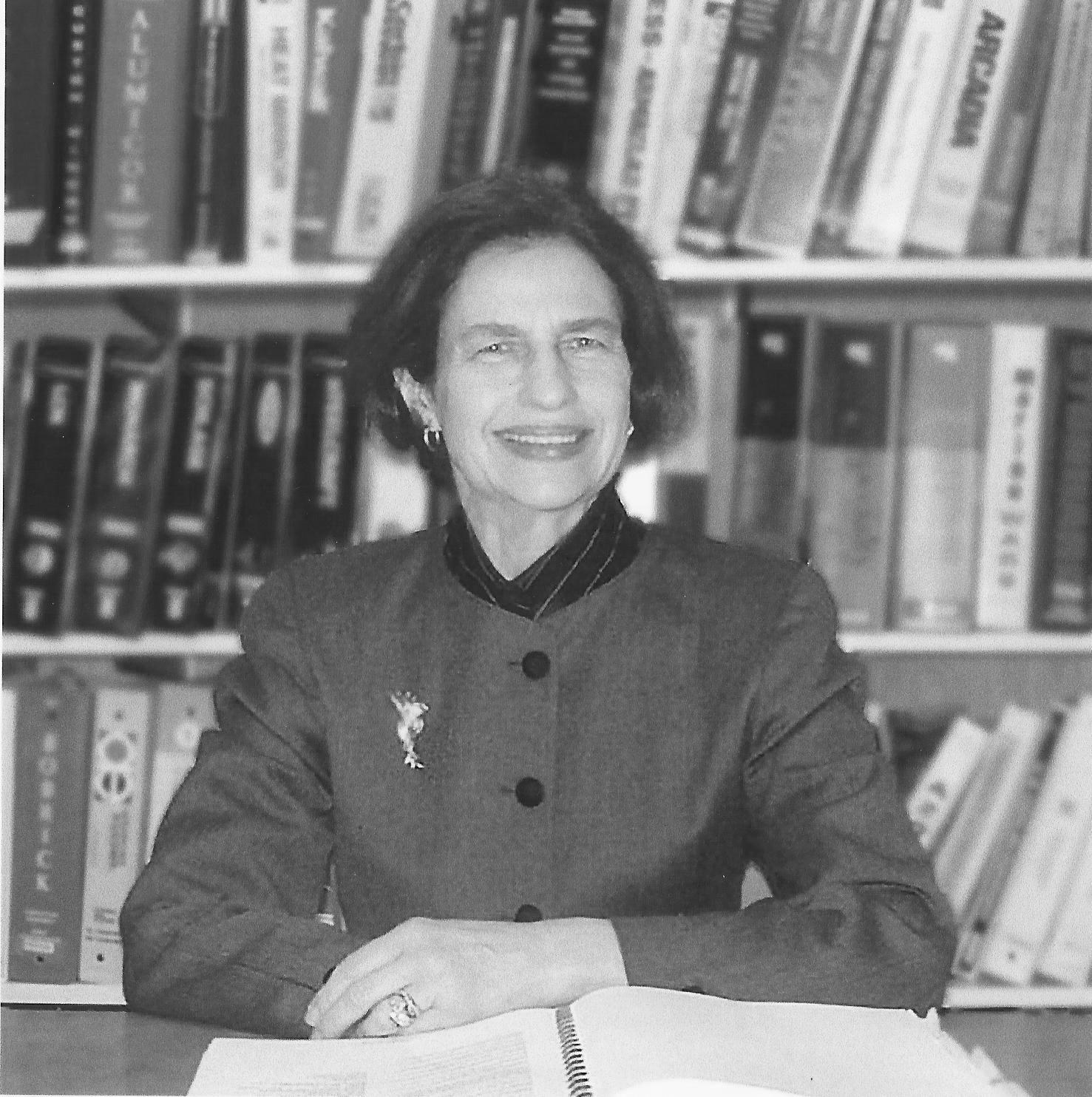
- Born: March 9, 1938 (age 87); Chicago, Illinois, United States
- Occupations: Architect and author
- Awards: Award of Excellence (2006), Boston Preservation Alliance Achievement Award (2001), Massachusetts Historical Commission Preservation Award (2001), BSA/IIDA/ASID Interior Design Award (2000)
- Practice: Cole and Goyette, Architects and Planners, Inc. (1981–2012); Doris Cole FAIA, Architecture/Planning (2012–present)
- Website: www.doriscolearchitect.com

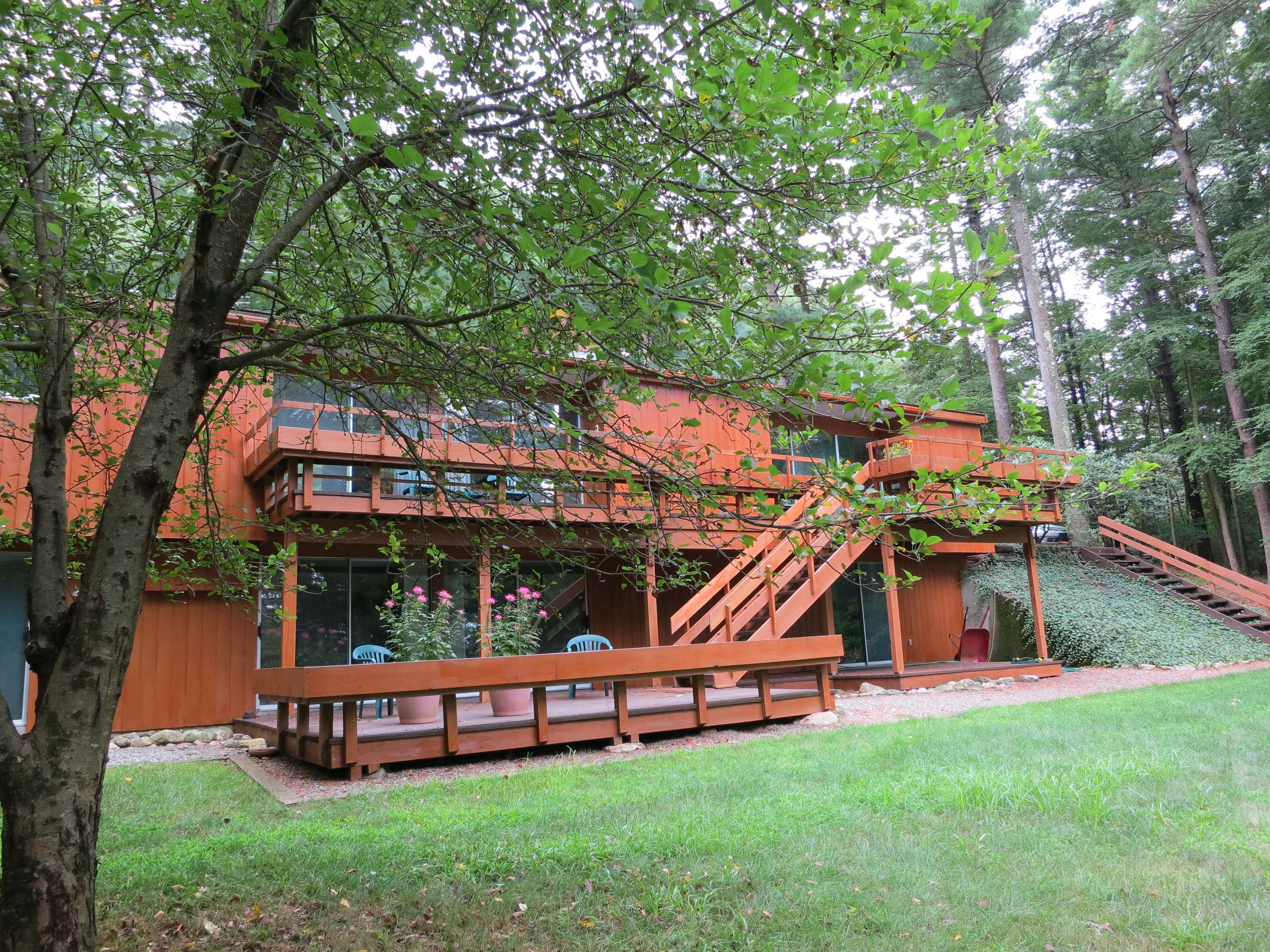
1972 design for private home in Concord

Doris Cole, FAIA, (born March 9, 1938) is an American architect and author. She was a founding principal of Cole and Goyette, Architects and Planners Inc. She is the author of From Tipi to Skyscraper: A History of Women in Architecture. which was the first book on women in architecture in the United States.

== Early life and education ==
Cole was born in Chicago, the younger of two daughters of Louis Cole and Helen Exley Moore, and was raised in the city and in Grand Rapids, graduating from East Grand Rapids High School in 1955. She received the AB cum laude from Radcliffe College in 1959, and the Master of Architecture from Harvard University Graduate School of Design in 1963.

== Architectural practice ==
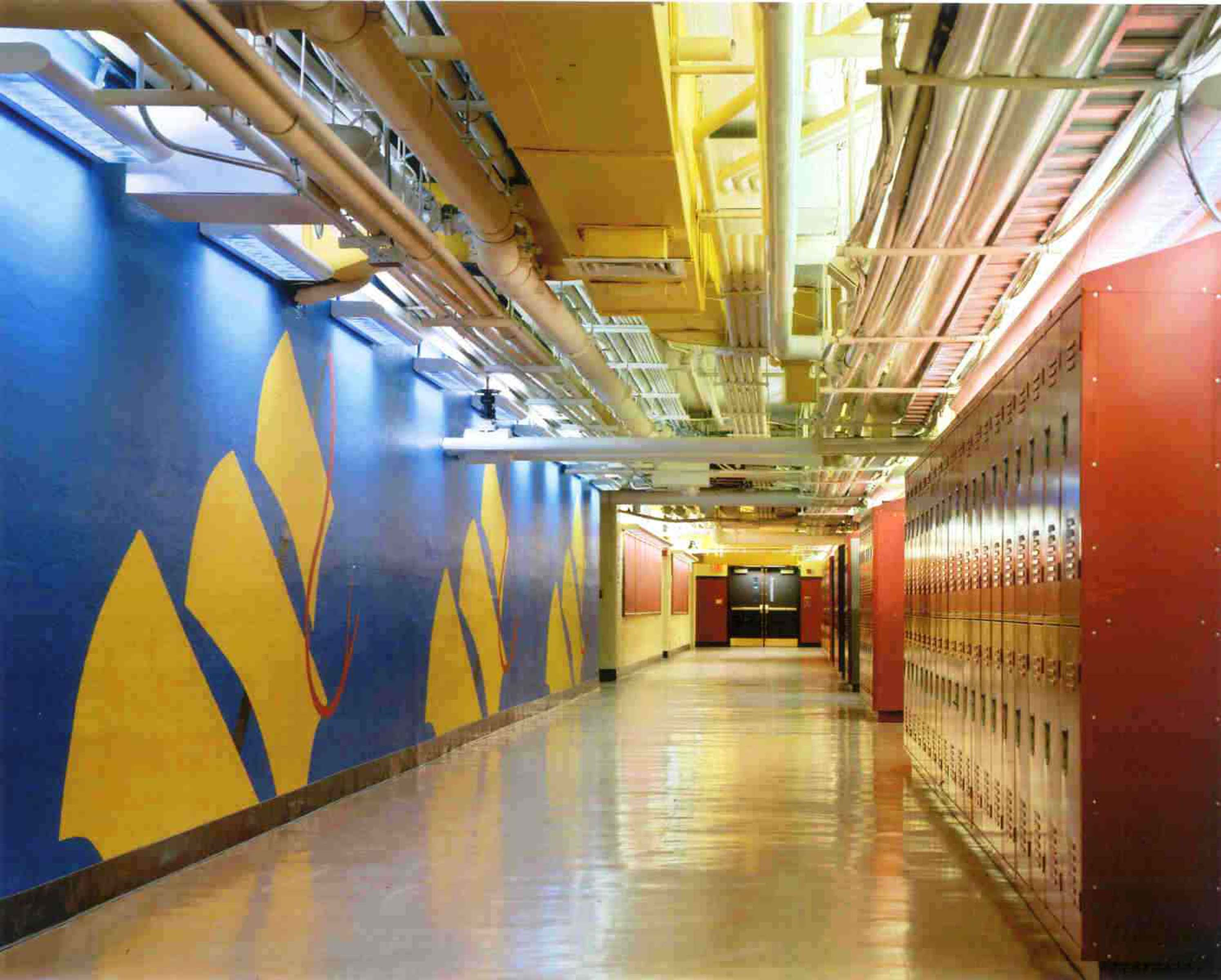
East Boston High School renovation and addition, 2001 (Photo: Nick Wheeler)

Cole's early career was spent in architectural offices in Paris and Boston. In 1981, she was a founding principal of Cole and Goyette, Architects and Planners in Cambridge, Massachusetts, with Harold Goyette, and she remained with the practice until 2012. The firm specialized in educational, commercial, and residential buildings for public and private clients.

Cole's projects included the East Boston High School addition and renovation. She also worked on Everett and Gardner schools additions and renovations in Boston. She also designed a private home and barn in Westwood.

In 1994, she was named a Fellow of the American Institute of Architects and in 2006 the Boston Society of Architects awarded her the Women in Design Award of Excellence.

In 2012, Cole established a new practice, Doris Cole FAIA, Architecture/Planning.

=== Other activities ===
Doris Cole wrote the first book on women in architecture in the United States, From Tipi to Skyscraper: A History of Women in Architecture. Other books include Eleanor Raymond, Architect, The Lady Architects: Lois Lilley Howe, Eleanor Manning, and Mary Almy 1893–1937, and School Treasures: Architecture of Historic Boston Schools.

Her community service has included the Corporation of Springfield College, Harvard Alumni Association and Harvard University Graduate School of Design Alumni/ae Council. She has lectured at the University of Virginia, Chicago Women in Architecture and elsewhere.

Cole's professional and personal papers are part of the Doris Cole and Harold Goyette Collection at the Harvard University, Graduate School of Design, Loeb Library, Special Collections.

The Loeb Library is also housing a collection of commentary posters. The posters are Doris Cole's response to recent questions asked about her life as an architect. These commentary posters consist of exploratory text and small watercolors. The posters are about architecture and related matters relevant to the past, present, and future of an architect.

== Selected projects ==
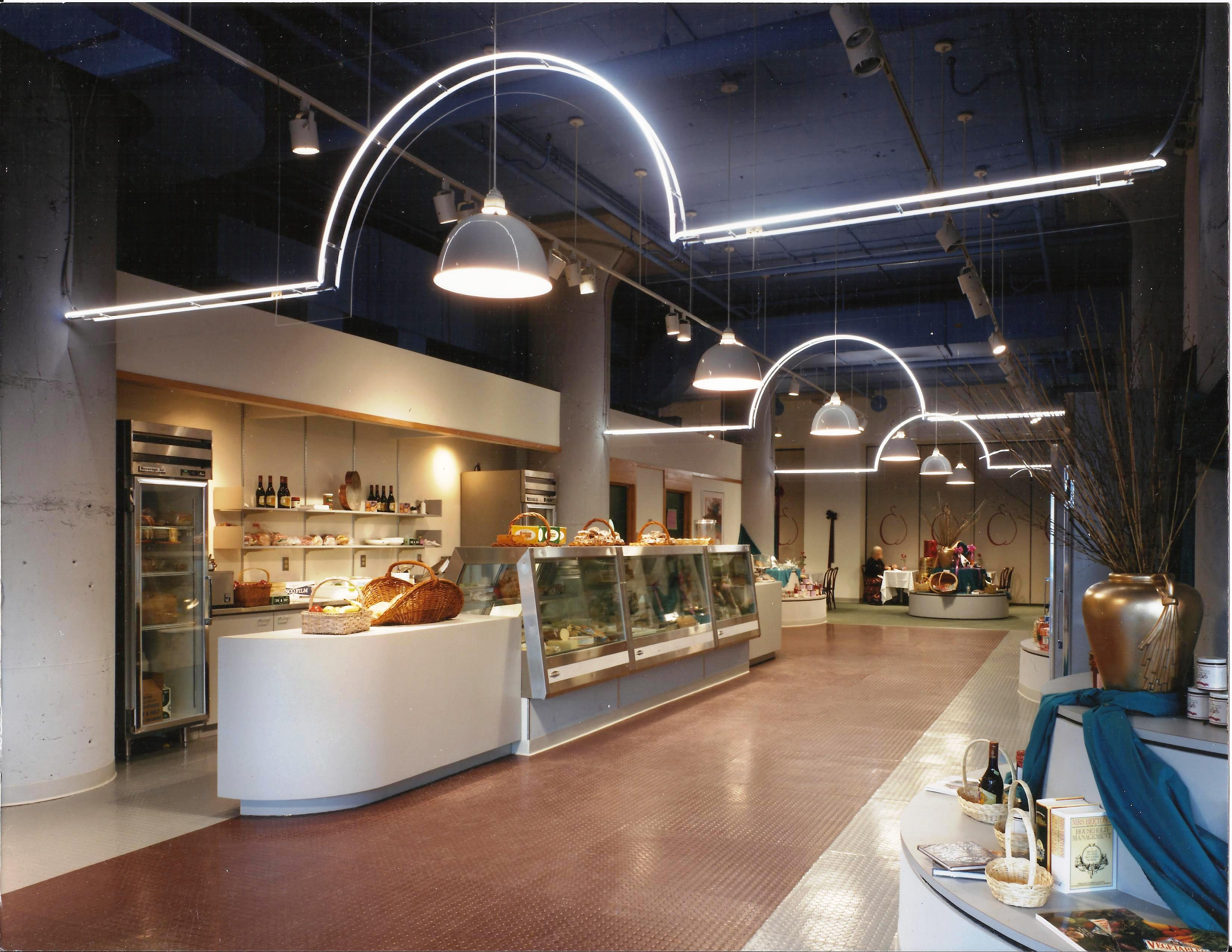
Damson & Greengage Gourmet Deli, Boston, Massachusetts, 1987

- Multimedia Interactive Children's Theater, Saint Anna's Church, OISTAT Theatre Architecture Competition, Prague, 2011.
- Trees of Memory, Atlantic City Boardwalk Holocaust Memorial Competition, Atlantic City, New Jersey, 2010.
- The Dubai Creek Tower, Tall Emblem Structure Competition, Dubai, UAR, 2009.
- Jeremiah Burke High School, rejuvenation and addition design, Boston, 2004.
- East Boston High School, rejuvenation and addition, Boston, 1996 and 2001.
- Higginson, Mason, and Stone Schools, rejuvenations and additions, Boston, 1995.
- Everett and Gardener Schools, rejuvenations and additions, Boston, 1993.
- Child Care Center, Boston City Hall, Boston, 1988.
- Damson & Greengage Gourmet Deli, Boston, 1987.
- Private residence and barn, Westwood, Massachusetts, 1988.

== Partial bibliography ==
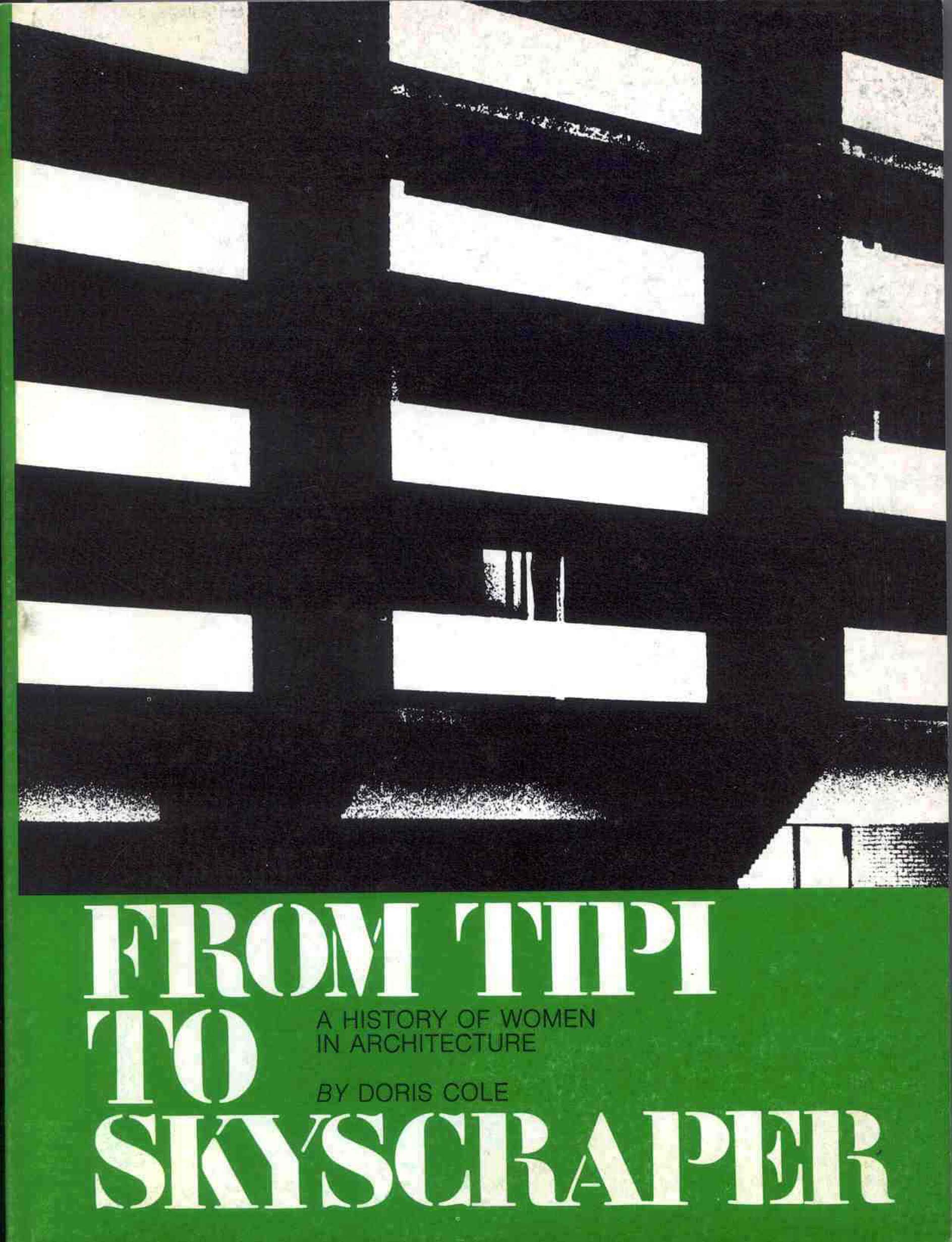
Cover of From Tipi to Skyscraper: A History of Women in Architecture

- Candid Reflections: Letters from Women in Architecture 1972 & 2004 (Midmarch Arts Press, 2007).
- School Treasures: Architecture of Historic Boston Schools, with Photographer, Nick Wheeler (Font & Center Press, 2002).
- "Stargaze: The Future of Women in Architecture." A Creative Constellation (CWA Chicago Women in Architecture, 1999).
- The Lady Architects: Lois Lilley Howe, Eleanor Manning and Mary Almy, 1893–1937, with Karen Cord Taylor (Midmarch Arts Press, 1990).
- "New England Women Architects." Pilgrims & Pioneers: New England Women in the Arts, edited by Alicia Faxon and Sylvia Moore. (Midmarch Arts Press, 1987).
- Eleanor Raymond, Architect. (Associated University Presses, 1981).
- "An Interview with Eleanor Raymond." Eleanor Raymond: Architectural Projects 1919–1973 (Boston: Institute of Contemporary Art, 1981).
- "Eleanor Raymond." Women in American Architecture: A Historic and Contemporary Perspective, edited by Susana Torre. (Whitney Library of Design, 1977).
- From Tipi to Skyscraper: A History of Women in Architecture (Boston: i press, 1973) .

== Selected awards and exhibitions ==
- Fellow of the American Institute of Architects, 1994.
- Selected for Exhibition and Catalogue, 2011, Multimedia Interactive Children's Theater, OISTAT Design Competition.
- Award of Excellence, 2006, Boston Society of Architects / Women in Design.
- Boston Preservation Alliance Achievement Award, 2001, East Boston High School, Boston, Massachusetts.
- Massachusetts Historical Commission Preservation Award, 2001, East Boston High School, Boston.
- BSA / IIDA / ASID Interior Design Award, 2000, Thomas Gardner and Edward Everett Schools, Boston.
- American Institute of Architects New York, Center of Architecture, New York, NY, 2012 Exhibition, "Change: Architecture and Engineering in the Middle East, 2000–Present." Architecture project included: Istanbul Disaster Prevention and Educational Centre.
- American Institute of Architects Exhibition, Many More: Women in Architecture 1978–1988; project included Damson and Greengage Restaurant.
- Boston Society of Architects Research Grant, 2004.
- National Endowment for the Arts Research Grant, 1981–1982.
