= Gary Walters =

American basketball coach

Playing career
- 1964–1967: Princeton
- Position: Point guard

Coaching career (HC unless noted)
- 1969–1970: Middlebury
- 1970–1973: Union (NY)
- 1973–1975: Princeton (assistant)
- 1975–1979: Dartmouth
- 1979–1981: Providence

Administrative career (AD unless noted)
- 1994–2014: Princeton

Head coaching record
- Overall: 254–171

Gary D. Walters is an American former basketball coach and college athletics administrator. He served as the head men's basketball coach at Middlebury College in 1969–70, Union College in Schenectady, New York from 1973 to 1975, Dartmouth College from 1975 to 1979, and Providence College from 1979 to 1981, compiling a career college basketball coaching record of 254–171. Walters was the athletic director at his alma mater, Princeton University from 1994 to 2014.

== College years ==
Walters played point guard for Princeton on the 1965 NCAA Final Four men's basketball team led by Bill Bradley. Walters was featured on the cover of Sports Illustrated with teammate Chris Thomforde in February 1967, while leading that year's team to a 25–3 record and a No. 5 ranking in the final national polls.

Walters graduated in 1967.

== Career ==
In 1970, Walters became the youngest head basketball coach in NCAA history, when he took over the duties at Middlebury College. He then spent three years as head coach at Union College, before returning to Princeton as Pete Carril's assistant coach in 1973, where he helped coach the Tigers to the 1975 NIT championship.

Walters also served as head coach at both Dartmouth College (and named New England Coach of the Year in 1976) and Providence College. In 1980 Walters was selected to coach at the U.S. Olympic Trials. He also served as a color analyst on Big East men's basketball telecasts in the 1980s and 1990s.

Walters joined Kidder, Peabody & Co. in 1981 as an investment representative. He left as a senior vice president and partner in 1990 to become senior partner of Woolf Associates Sports Management in Boston. He subsequently became managing director of Seaward Management, a Boston-based investment advisory firm, in 1992.

From June 1994 through August 2014, Walters was the director of athletics at Princeton, his alma mater. He was succeeded by another Princeton alum, Mollie Marcoux (Class of '91).

Princeton had four national champions during the 2012–13 school year. The Princeton field hockey and fencing teams won NCAA Championships, while the men's distance medley relay and épée fencer Eliza Stone claimed individual crowns. A year earlier, the Tigers produced three national champions in 2011–12 (the men's squash team, épée fencer Jonathan Yergler and steeplechase runner Donn Cabral). Princeton also had 17 Olympians who won a total of seven medals at the 2012 Summer Games in London, for a total that would have ranked 31st had Princeton been a country.

Walters has seen six members of his administrative staff become collegiate Directors of Athletics or Division I conference commissioners; most recently Michael Cross was appointed AD at Bradley in January 2010. Others include Jamie Zaninovich (Commissioner, West Coast Conference), Jim Fiore (former AD, Stony Brook), George Vander Zwaag (AD, Rochester) and Jim McLaughlin (AD, Union).

Princeton won 214 Ivy League championships and 48 national championships under Walters tenure as athletic director.

=== Facilities renovation ===
In addition to on-field success in sports, Walters has overseen a renovation of athletic facilities, most notably the demolition of Palmer Stadium and the building of Princeton Stadium and Weaver Track and Field Stadium in its place. Other projects have included the construction of the Class of 1952 Stadium, new squash courts in Jadwin Gym, the addition of 16 locker rooms to the Caldwell Field House and the renovation and expansion of the boathouse to the Shea Rowing Center. In 2008, Princeton constructed Roberts Stadium, a $14 million soccer facility, which is considered to be one of the finest, if not the finest, soccer pitch in intercollegiate competition. In 2011, the Lenz Tennis Center was completely upgraded and the Cordish Family Pavilion, which overlooks the tennis courts, was dedicated. A redesign of the Class of 1952 Stadium, which included the construction of a new, separate field hockey facility on Bedford Field, was completed in the fall of 2013, creating one of the most beautiful collegiate athletic parks in the country.

=== Recognition ===
Princeton finished in the Top 25 in the NACDA Directors’ Cup in 1996, 1998, 2001 and 2002, making Princeton the only non-scholarship school ever to do so. Princeton has been the highest-finishing non-scholarship school every year but one in the history of the Directors’ Cup. Led by four NCAA tournament teams and two Final Four teams, Princeton reached as high as No. 2 in the fall 2009 rankings. Following Princeton's 2012 national championship in field hockey and strong finishes in men's and women's cross country, Princeton topped the Director's Cup standings in the Fall of 2012 before finishing 33rd in the final standings and was the only FCS school in the Top 50.

Walters was appointed to the NCAA Division I Men's Basketball Committee in 2002 and was elected chair of the committee for the 2006–07 season.

Princeton University has twice honored Walters in recent years. In 2007, he received the Princeton Varsity Club Award of Merit and in 2012 the Princeton Class of 1967 recognized his 18 years of loyal and distinguished service to the university by presenting him with the Class's Loyal Service Award.
