= Princeton Tigers =

Athletic teams of Princeton University

- University: Princeton University
- NCAA: Division I (FCS)
- Conference: Ivy League (primary) Other conferences: List: ECAC Hockey; EARC (rowing); EAWRC (women's rowing); ECVA (volleyball); ECWA (wrestling); CWPA (women's water polo); CSA (squash)
- Athletic director: John Mack
- Location: Princeton, New Jersey
- Varsity teams: 35 teams
- Football stadium: Princeton Stadium
- Basketball arena: Jadwin Gymnasium
- Ice hockey arena: Baker Rink
- Baseball stadium: Bill Clarke Field
- Softball stadium: Cynthia Lynn Paul '94 Field
- Soccer stadium: Roberts Stadium
- Aquatics center: Denunzio Pool
- Lacrosse stadium: Class of 1952 Stadium
- Volleyball arena: Jadwin Gymnasium
- Other venues: Shea Rowing Center
- Nickname: Tigers
- Colors: Black and orange
- Mascot: The Tiger
- Fight song: Princeton Cannon Song
- Website: goprincetontigers.com

The Princeton Tigers are the athletic teams of Princeton University. The school sponsors 35 varsity teams in 20 sports. The school has won several NCAA national championships, including one in men's fencing, three in women's lacrosse, seven in men's lacrosse, and eight in men's golf. Princeton's men's and women's crews have also won numerous national rowing championships. The field hockey team made history in 2012 as the first Ivy League team to win the NCAA Division I Championship in field hockey.

== Teams ==
Men's sports	Women's sports
Baseball	Basketball
Basketball	Cross country
Cross country	Fencing
Fencing	Field hockey
Football	Golf
Golf	Ice hockey
Ice hockey	Lacrosse
Lacrosse	Rowing^{1}
Rowing^{1}	Rugby
Rugby^{2}	Soccer
Soccer	Softball
Squash	Squash
Swimming and diving	Swimming and diving
Tennis	Tennis
Track and field	Track and field
Volleyball	Volleyball
Water polo	Water polo
Wrestling	
^{1}includes both heavyweight and lightweight – ^{2}club only

=== Basketball ===
==== Men's basketball ====
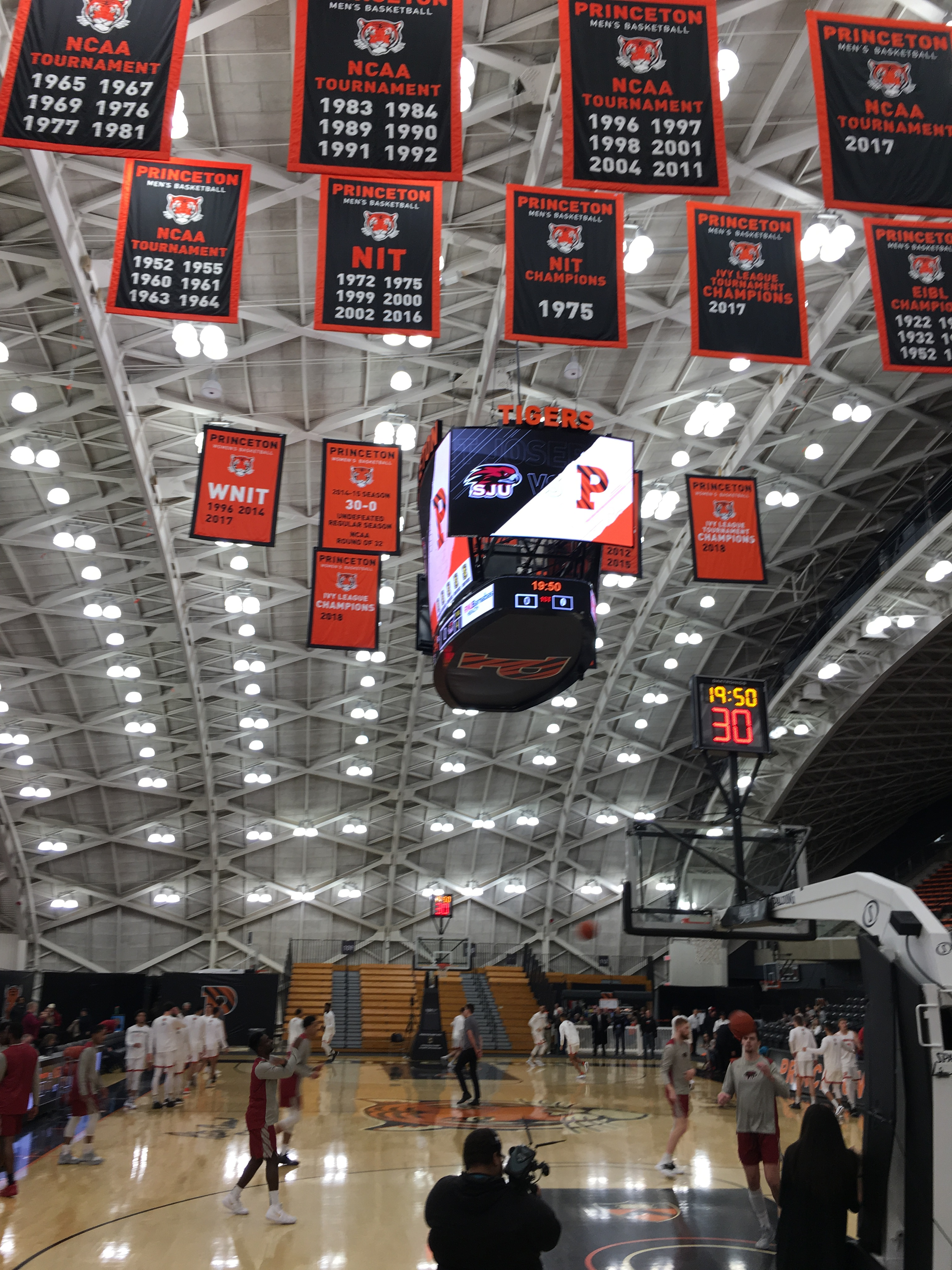
Some of the banners highlighting the achievements of the men's and women's basketball teams, as seen below the rafters of their home Jadwin Gymnasium

Princeton's basketball team is perhaps the best-known team within the Ivy League. Its most notable upset was the 1996 defeat of defending NCAA champion UCLA in the tournament's opening round, Carril's final collegiate victory. In 1989, the team almost became the only #16 seed to win, losing to Georgetown 50–49. During that 29-year span, Pete Carril won thirteen Ivy League championships and received eleven NCAA berths and two NIT bids. Princeton placed third in the 1965 NCAA Tournament and won the NIT championship in 1975. The deliberate "Princeton offense" is a legacy of his coaching career.

From 1992 to 2001, a nine-year span, the men's basketball team entered the NCAA tournament four times. Notably, the Ivy League has never had an at-large entry in the NCAA tournament. For the last half-century, Princeton and the University of Pennsylvania have traditionally battled for men's basketball dominance in the Ivy League; Princeton had its first losing season in 50 years of Ivy League basketball in 2005. Princeton tied the record for fewest points in a Division I game since the 3-point line started in 1986–87 when they scored 21 points in a loss against Monmouth University on December 14, 2005.

The 1924–25 team was retroactively named the national champion by the Helms Athletic Foundation and the Premo-Porretta Power Poll.

==== Women's basketball ====
Princeton University's varsity women's basketball program has been one of the most successful teams in the Ivy League. The team completed the 2014-15 season with a 31-0 record and was ranked among the top 25 teams in NCAA Division I women's basketball before advancing to the round of 32 in the 2015 NCAA Women's Division I Basketball Tournament.

=== Football ===
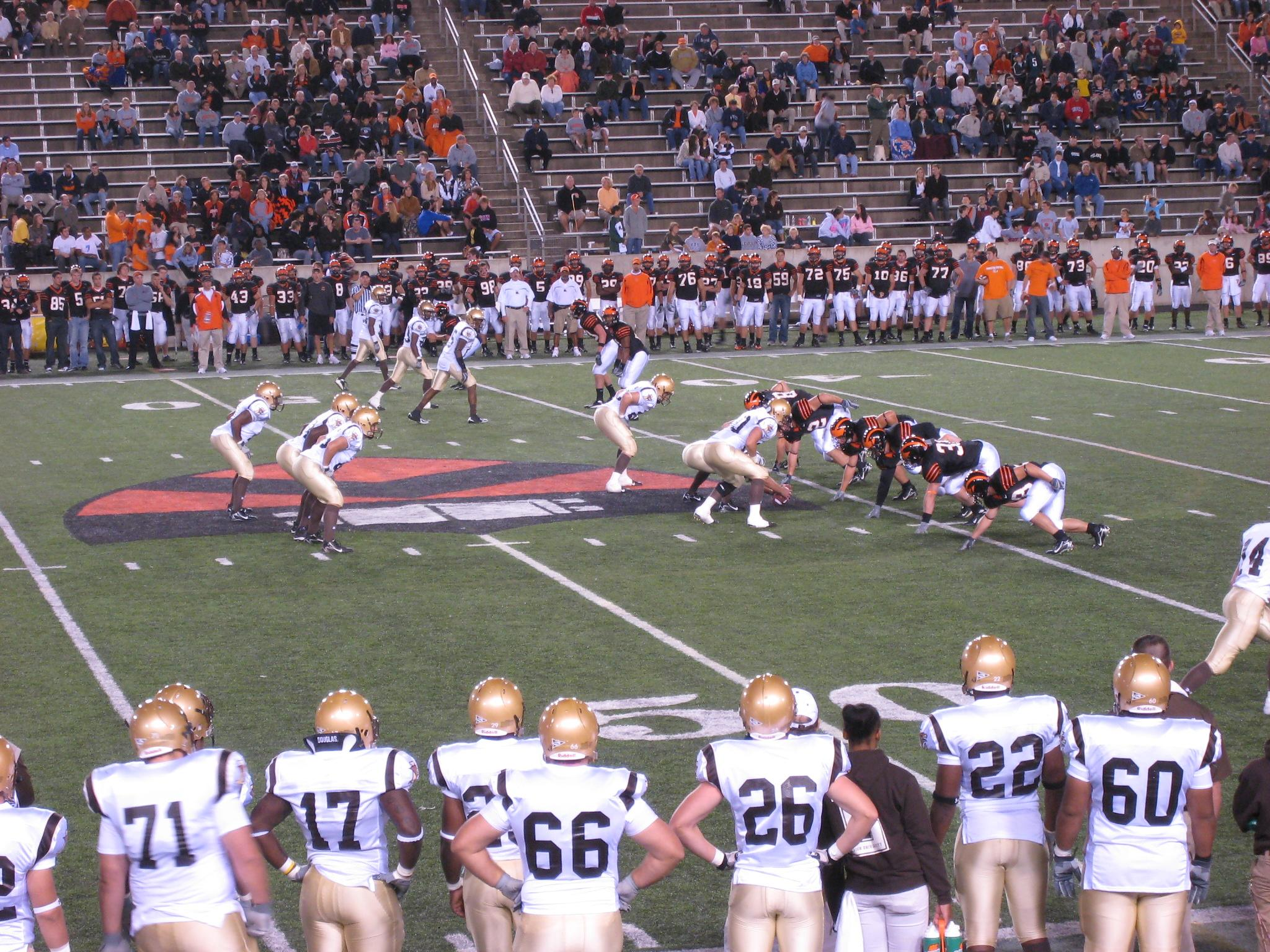
Princeton vs. Lehigh, September 2007

The football team competes in the Football Championship Subdivision of NCAA Division I with the rest of the Ivy League. As of 2021, Princeton claims 28 national football championships, which would make it the most of any school, although the NCAA only recognizes 15 of the wins. Twenty-one former players have been inducted into the College Football Hall of Fame.

The first football game played between teams representing American colleges was an unfamiliar ancestor of today's college football because it was played under soccer-style London Football Association rules. The game, between Rutgers College (now Rutgers University) and the College of New Jersey (now Princeton University), took place on November 6, 1869, at College Field (now the site of the College Avenue Gymnasium at Rutgers University) in New Brunswick, New Jersey. Rutgers won by a score of six "runs" to Princeton's four. The 1869 game between Rutgers and Princeton is notable because it is the first documented game of any sport called "football" between two American colleges. It is also noteworthy because it occurred two years before a codified rugby game would be played in England. The Princeton/Rutgers game was significantly different from American rules football today but, nonetheless, it was the first inter-collegiate football contest in the United States. Another similar game took place between Rutgers and Columbia University in 1870 and a third notable game took place between Tufts University and Harvard University in 1875. The popularity of intercollegiate competition in football would spread throughout the country shortly thereafter.

Princeton's football helmets are also the basis for Michigan Wolverines football team's famed winged helmets, as introduced by Fritz Crisler, the coach at Princeton before he was hired as the coach of the University of Michigan.

==== Sprint ====
In addition to the varsity Tigers, Princeton, like a number of other Ivy League schools, also fielded a sprint football squad for players 172 pounds and lighter from 1934 to 2015. The lightweight Tigers won at least a share of the league title eight times, five of those being from between 1937 and 1942. Their last championship, split with the Army Cadets, came in 1989. The Tigers sprint squad collapsed in 1999, which began a losing streak that spanned parts of 17 seasons and 106 games (a collegiate football record), including at least four forfeits; by the end of the 2015 season, Princeton's athletics department determined that the addition of several schools whose sole football team was a sprint squad (and thus were teams that could get all of the best players at their respective schools) and the loss of most of the Ivy League schools, along with the inability of Princeton to recruit more and better players for the team without compromising its other athletic programs or its academic standards, meant that the team would likely be hopelessly outmatched and that this would pose a safety hazard for the players they could recruit. This conclusion led Princeton to drop sprint football in April 2016.

=== Golf ===
==== Men's golf ====
The men's golf team have won 12 national championships, and they have won the Ivy League title 26 times. They have had seven NCAA individual champions: Louis Bayard, Jr. (1987), Percy Pyne (1899), Frank Reinhart (1903), Albert Seckel (1909), Simpson Dean (1921) and George Dunlap (1930 and 1931).

==== Women's golf ====
The women's golf team was founded as a club sport in 1978, coached by Betty Whelan. A group called "Friends of Women's Golf" began fundraising immediately, and the group began lobbying for inclusion as a varsity sport. After ten years of being denied varsity status by the university, representatives from the team contacted the ACLU asking for assistance and raising the possibility of a lawsuit under the protections of Title IX of the Civil Rights Act. In 1991, the university committed to supporting a varsity women's golf program.

After becoming a varsity team, women's golf too the Northeast championships in 1995, and Mary Moan won the first Ivy League individual championship in 1997. The team won its first Ivy League title in 1999.

=== Ice hockey ===
==== Men's ice hockey ====
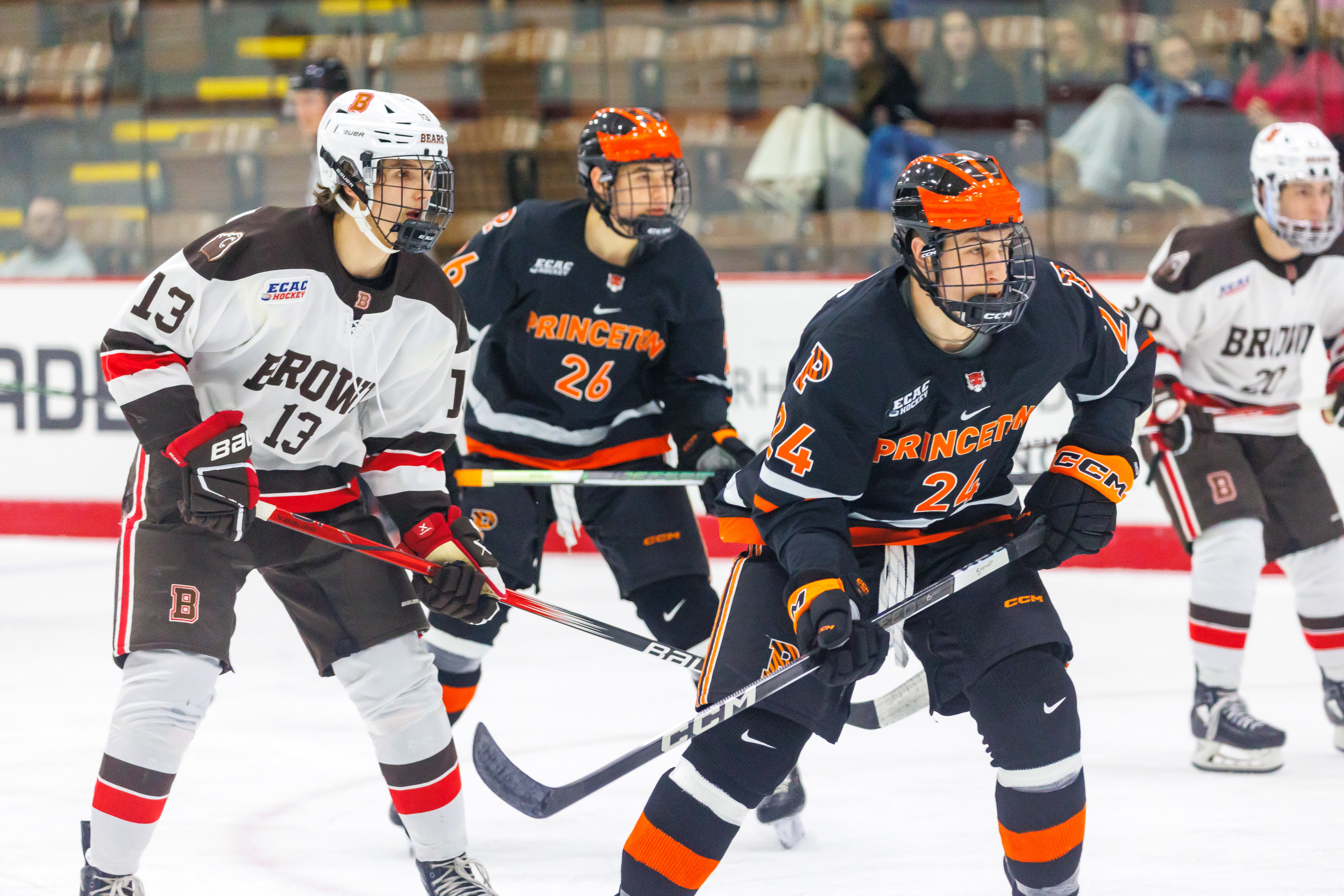
Princeton v Brown ice hockey game in 2024

Princeton University had an ice hockey team organized already during the 1894–95 season, when the school still went by the name of College of New Jersey. On March 3, 1895 the university ice hockey team faced a Baltimore aggregation at the North Avenue Ice Palace in Baltimore, Maryland and won by a score of 5–0. The players on the 1895 team were Chester Derr, John Brooks, Howard Colby, James Blair, Frederick Allen, Ralph Hoagland and Art Wheeler.

==== Women's ice hockey ====
On November 24, 1979, the Princeton Tigers played their first varsity game against the University of Pennsylvania. They play at the Hobey Baker Memorial Rink.

In the 2019–2020 season, they won their first ECAC championship, defeating #1 ranked Cornell by a score of 3–2 in overtime.

=== Lacrosse ===
==== Men's lacrosse ====
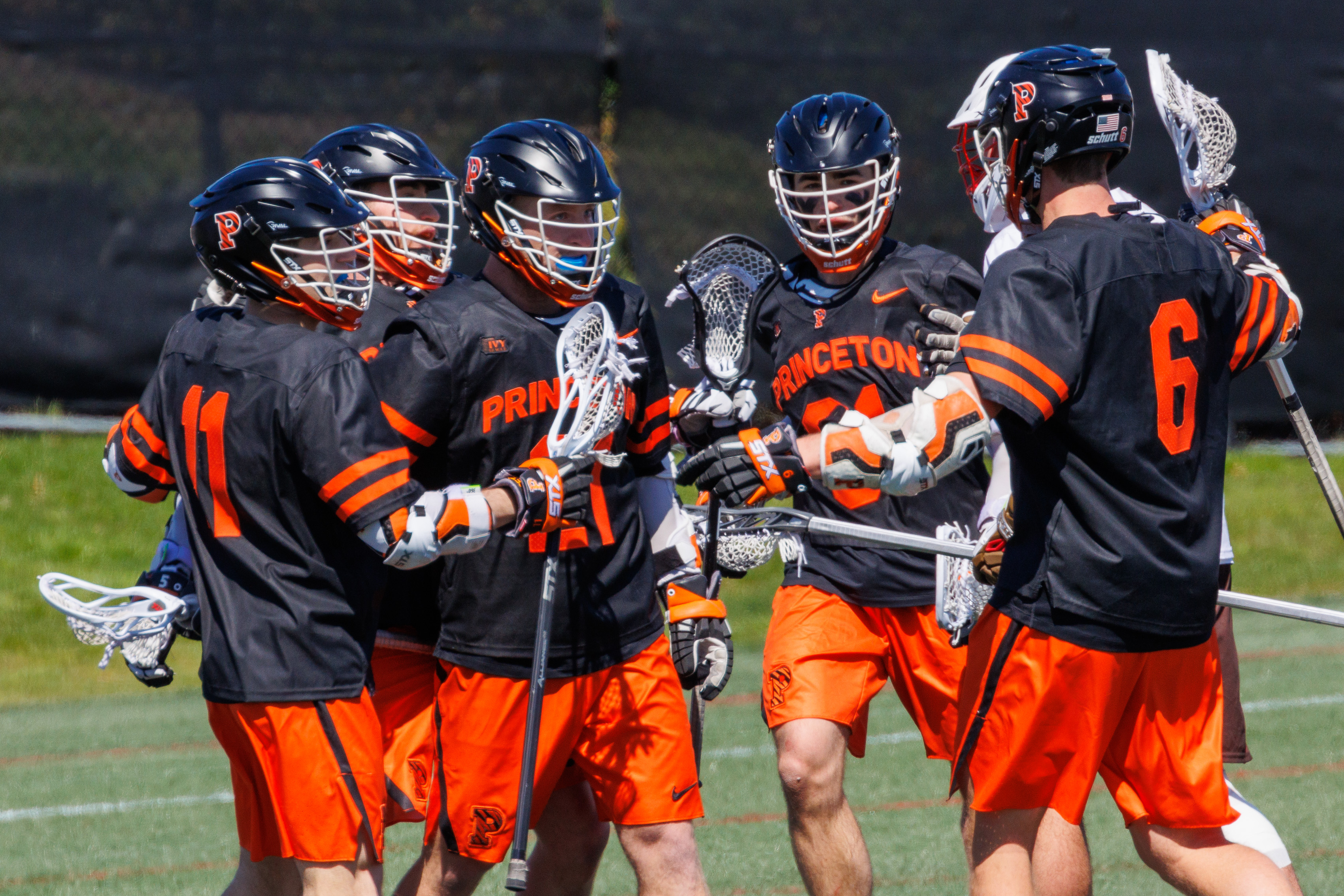
Princeton lacrosse players in 2022

The university's men's lacrosse team has enjoyed significant success since the early 1990s and is widely recognized as a perennial powerhouse in the Division I ranks. The team has won 28 Ivy League titles and seven national titles.

==== Women's lacrosse ====
The Princeton Tigers women's lacrosse team has won 3 NCAA championships.

=== Rowing ===
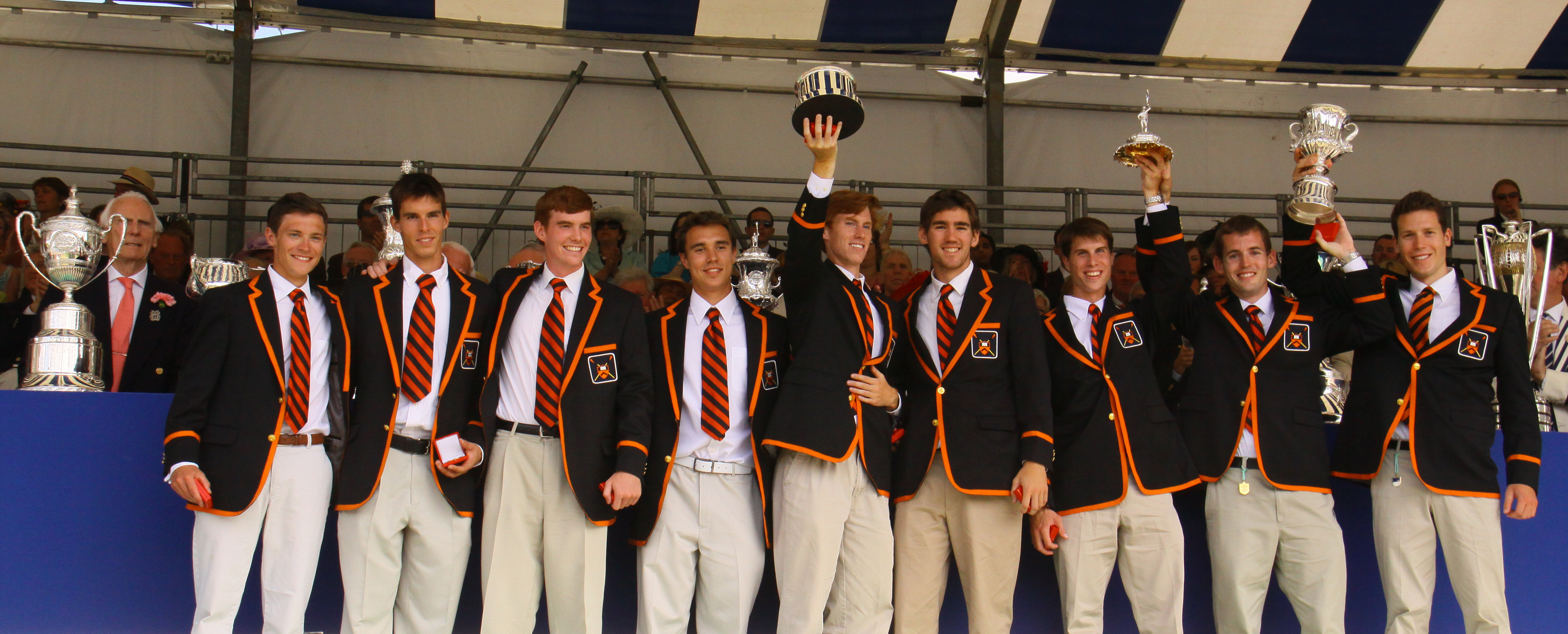
The varsity lightweight men celebrate winning the Temple Cup at Henley Royal Regatta, July 2009.

Rowing was introduced to Princeton in 1870 by a handful of undergraduates who bought two old boats with their own funds and formed an impromptu "navy" on the Delaware and Raritan Canal. The construction of Lake Carnegie in 1906 enabled the sport to expand and laid the foundation for today's rowing program at Princeton. More recently, an $8 million upgrade and expansion of the existing boathouse in 2000 formed Shea Rowing Center, one of the finest rowing facilities in the country.

With 150 athletes, 60 rowing shells, and 12 coaches, trainers, and boat riggers, crew is the largest varsity sport at Princeton, and one of the most successful. In recent years, from 2000 through 2010, Princeton varsity crews (both men's and women's) won a total of 14 Eastern Sprints, IRA (national), and NCAA championships, as well as two international events at Henley Royal Regatta.

The Princeton boathouse is often a summer base for U.S. national teams in training, and many Princeton rowers and coaches have gone on to compete at the World Rowing Championships and the Olympics.

=== Rugby ===
==== Men's rugby ====
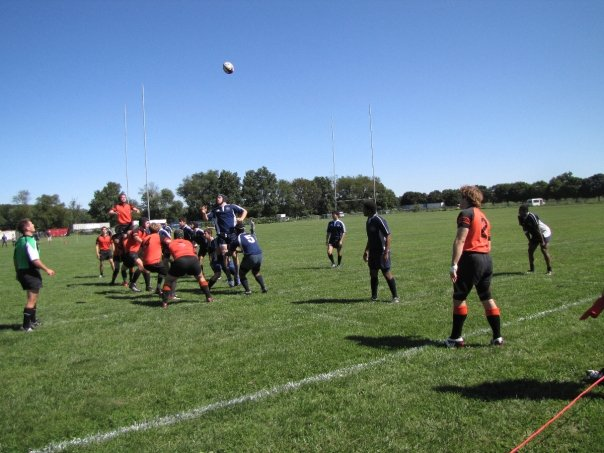
Princeton v Yale in 2009

Princeton has a long tradition in the game of rugby in the US, having played Rutgers University in 1869 the first United States intercollegiate game, which, according to U.S. Soccer, used rules that resembled rugby union and association football and had little resemblance to gridiron American football

Princeton rugby was reorganized in 1931 under the leadership of Monte Barak, Hugh Sloan H.F. Langenberg, and coach John Boardman Whitton. It has been playing continuously ever since. Over 5,000 people attended the inaugural Harvard - Princeton game in 1931. The men's rugby team was Ivy League champions in 2004, 1979, 1977, 1973, 1971 and 1969.

==== Women's rugby ====
The women's rugby team was national champions in 1995 and 1996. Princeton women advanced to the Final Four in 1997, 1999, 2000, 2001, 2004 and 2005. 35 Princeton women have been named All-Americans. The team will become Princeton's 19th varsity program for women starting in the 2022–23 academic year.

=== Soccer ===
==== Men's soccer ====
Princeton's soccer roots trace to the first de facto college football game held in 1869 v Rutgers University, with rules based on The Football Association) is considered the first "not official" collegiate soccer match and the birth of the sport in the United States.

The team is one of the oldest active soccer clubs in the United States, playing their first official match in November 1906. The team has won ten Ivy League and eight ICSFA tournaments.

=== Softball ===
Princeton's softball team appeared in the Women's College World Series in 1995 and 1996.

=== Squash ===
==== Men's squash ====
The men have won 18 Ivy League championships. They are a four-time winner of the Squash Sloane Award for Team Sportsmanship.

=== Swimming and Diving ===
==== Men's swimming and diving ====
The men have a long history of success in the Ivy League, winning the Ivy League title 30 times. The program's history also includes NCAA relay titles in 1989 and 1990, and 1992 Olympic gold medalist Nelson Diebel.

=== Tennis ===
Pablo Eisenberg, who went on to become a professional tennis player at Wimbledon and a gold medal winner in the Maccabiah Games in Israel, as well as a scholar and social justice advocate, played tennis for Princeton in 1952, 1953, and 1954.

=== Track and field ===
==== Women's track and field ====
Princeton's women's track & field team experienced success under coach Peter Farrell, winning a combined 18 Ivy League titles for its outdoor and indoor team. Farrell was the one who founded the women's track and field team in 1977 and stayed their head coach until 2016 when he retired.

=== Volleyball ===
==== Men's volleyball ====
The men's volleyball program achieved varsity status in 1997 – though it had competed for two decades as a club sport before then – and competes in the Eastern Intercollegiate Volleyball Association.

The Tigers have the honor of being one of only two teams since the formation of the EIVA in 1988 to win the EIVA championship and advance to the NCAA Men's National Collegiate Volleyball Championship, with every other title having been won by the Penn State Nittany Lions. The Tigers bested the Nittany Lions in the 1998 EIVA semifinals, and they then went on to beat Rutgers-Newark; as a result, they won the 1998 EIVA championship and gained a spot in the NCAA tournament.

The Tigers have had three players earn All-American honors – Marin Gjaja '91, Derek Devens '98 and Cody Kessel '14.

=== Wrestling ===
The Princeton Tiger Wrestling team was started in 1905. The Princeton wrestling team competes in Dillon Gym.

Jadwin Gym has served host to five previous EIWA Championships (1969, 1979, 1981, 1987 and 2012), as well as both the 1975 and 1981 NCAA Wrestling Championships. The current head coach is Joe Dubuque.

Princeton has two national champions to its credit: Bradley Glass in 1951 and Pat Glory in 2023.

== Championships ==
=== NCAA team championships ===
Princeton has 25 NCAA team national championships.

- Men's (20)
  - Golf ^{†} (12): 1914, 1916, 1919, 1920, 1922, 1923, 1927, 1928, 1929, 1930, 1937, 1940
  - Lacrosse (7): 1992, 1994, 1996, 1997, 1998, 2001, 2026
  - Fencing (1): 1964
- Women's (4)
  - Field Hockey (1): 2012
  - Lacrosse (3): 1994, 2002, 2003
- Co-ed (1)
  - Fencing (1): 2013

† The NCAA started sponsoring the intercollegiate golf championship in 1939, but it retained the titles from the 41 championships previously conferred by the National Intercollegiate Golf Association in its records.

== School spirit ==
School spirit

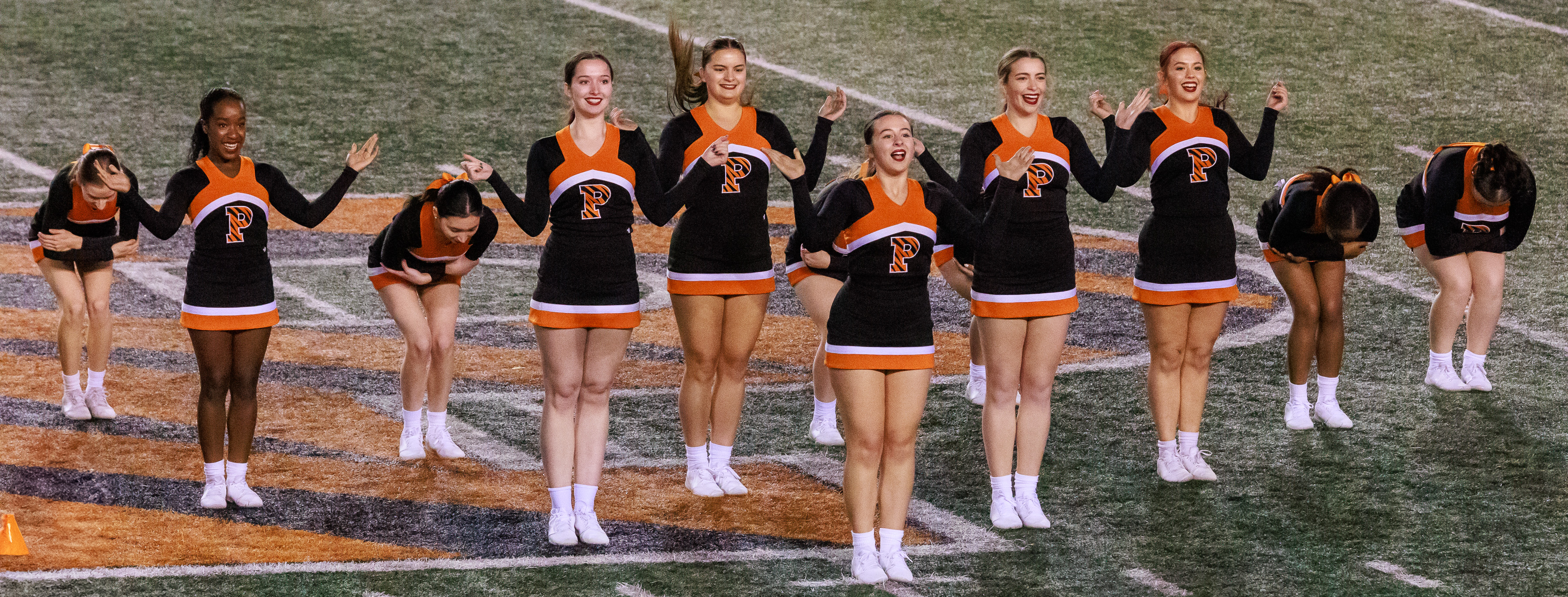
Cheerleaders

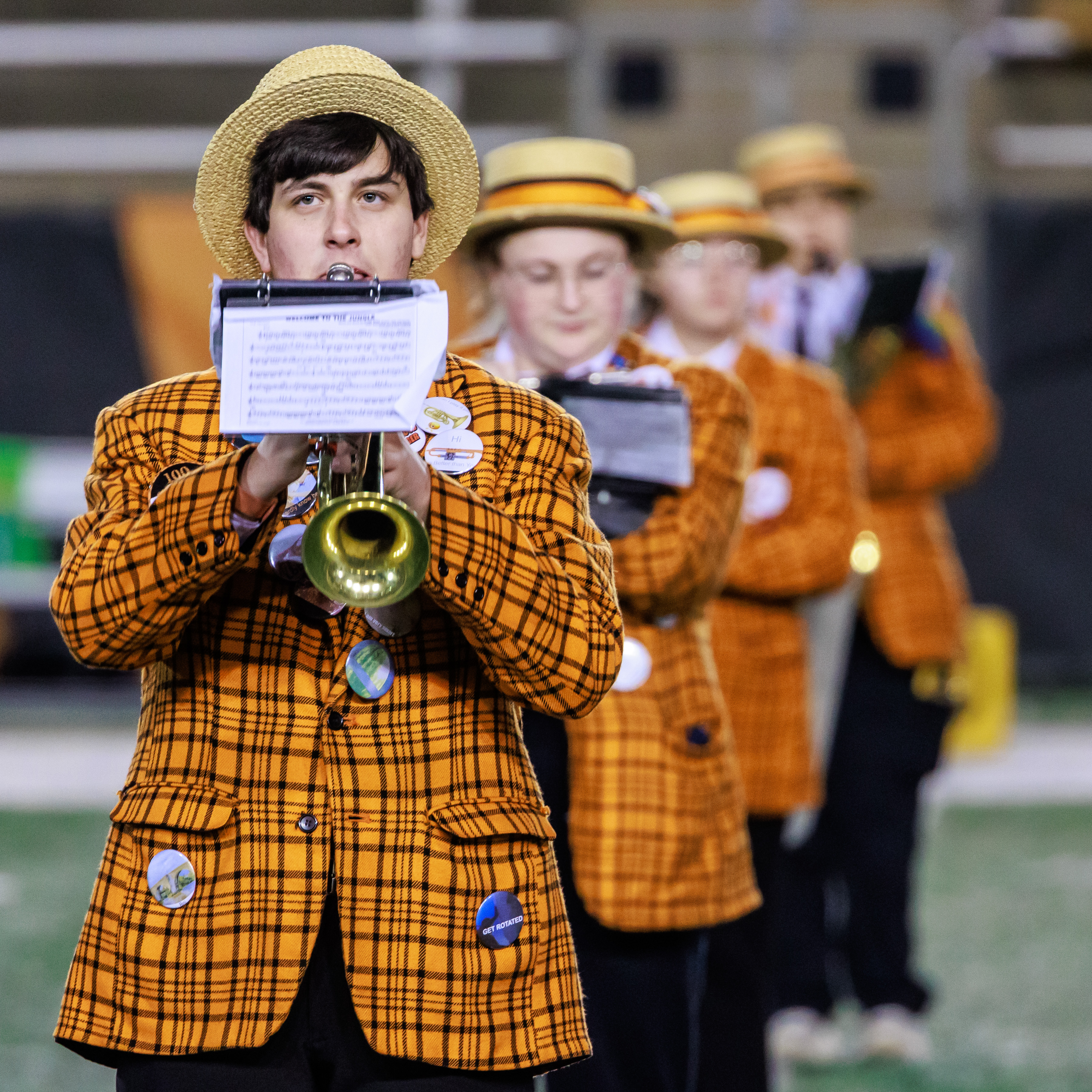
Band

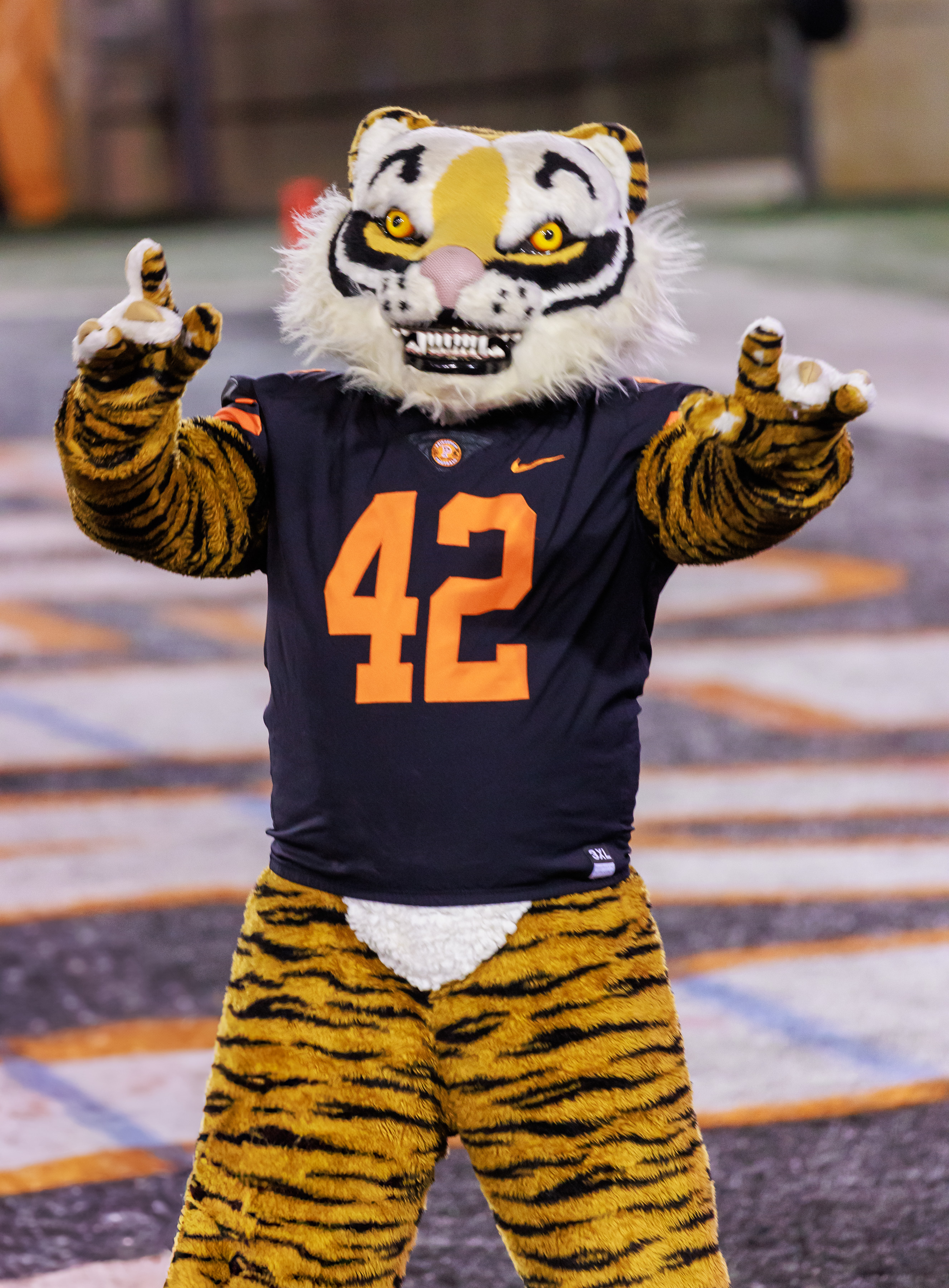
Mascot

=== Cheerleading ===
Princeton played a significant role in the history of American cheerleading. Cheers have been noted on the Princeton campus at least as early as 1860 (though not necessarily in an athletic context). By 1869, cheers were common at athletic events, including baseball and football home and away games, and at practices. Thomas Peebles, Princeton class of 1882, brought the Princeton cheers to the University of Minnesota where he was football coach. There, Peebles had students lead organized chants during football games. However, the term "cheer-leader" was used at Princeton as early as 1897.

=== Tiger mascot ===
The Tiger nickname originated from the practice of football players wearing orange and black stripes on their clothing, which led sportswriters to call them "tigers." An undergraduate dressed as a tiger mascot began appearing at football and basketball games in the 1940s.

=== Princeton University Band ===
The Princeton University Band was founded in 1919, and played its first public performance at the Princeton-Maryland football game of October 9, 1920. The band started as a formal marching band, but by the 1970s had transformed into a scramble band.

== Facilities ==
The stadium is Princeton Stadium, which replaced Palmer Stadium in 1998. Baseball is played at Bill Clarke Field. Basketball is played at Jadwin Gymnasium. Ice hockey is played at Baker Rink. Soccer is played at Roberts Stadium. Lacrosse is played at Class of 1952 Stadium. The men's and women's volleyball teams and the wrestling team compete at Dillon Gymnasium. All crews train at Shea Rowing Center and compete on Lake Carnegie. The Rugby Team plays at Rickerson Field on West Windsor Fields.

== See also ==
- List of NCAA schools with the most Division I national championships
- List of college athletic programs in New Jersey, USA#Division I
- List of Princeton University Olympians
