= East Boston High School =

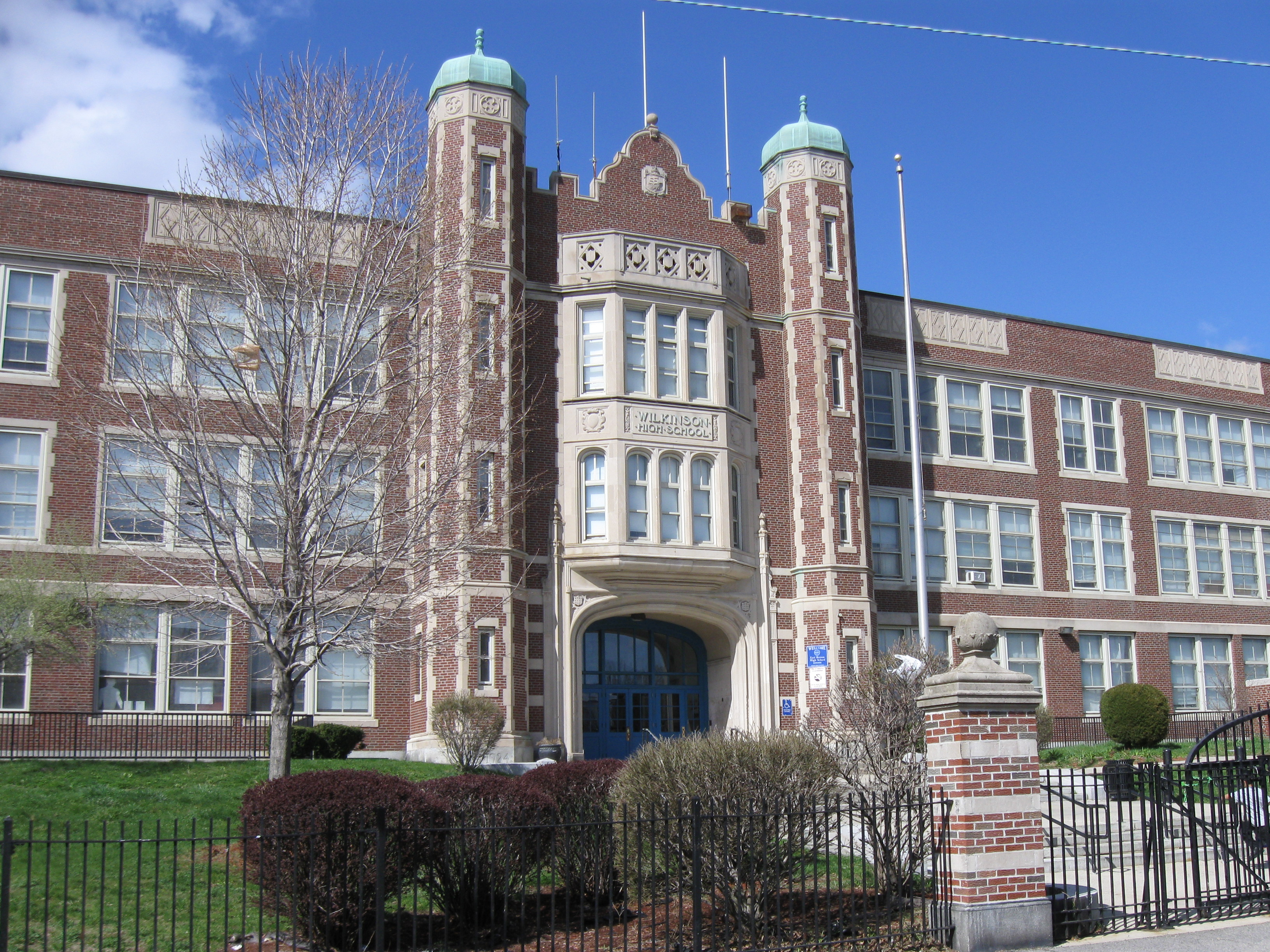
- View of East Boston High School in 2011.

Location
- 86 White Street; Boston, Massachusetts 02128; United States; 42.38084°N 71.03493°W

Information
- Type: Public high school
- Motto: Class, Pride, and Tradition
- Established: 1880
- School district: Boston Public Schools
- Head of School: Phillip R. Brangiforte
- Faculty: 108.5 (FTE)
- Grades: 7-12
- Enrollment: 1,293 (2023–2024)
- Student to teacher ratio: 11.5
- Colors: Blue and gold
- Athletics conference: Boston City League
- Nickname: Jets
- Accreditation: NEASC
- Yearbook: The Noddler
- Website: www.ebhsjets.net

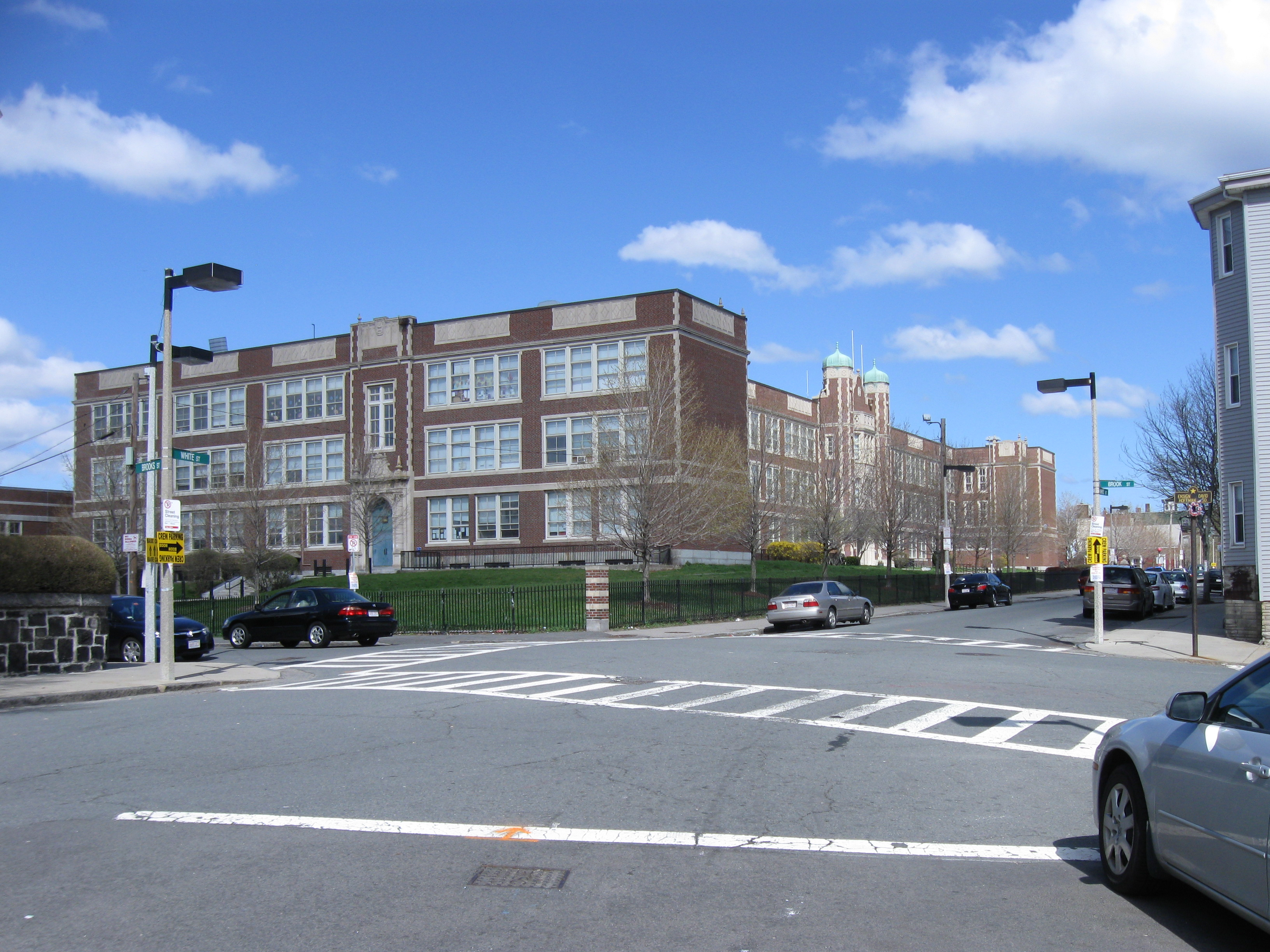
View of East Boston High School.

East Boston High School is a public high school located in the neighborhood of East Boston in Boston, Massachusetts. Specifically, the school is situated in the Eagle Hill Historic District. East Boston High is part of the Boston Public Schools system.

== Academics ==
The Boston Public Schools assigns students to East Boston High School based on applicant preference and students priorities in various zones. Due to isolated geographic location, all East Boston residents are guaranteed seats at the school.

East Boston High offers various Advanced Placement courses, honors courses, and three languages; Spanish Italian and Latin. The school also accepts students with disabilities under its Special Education department. According to the 2024–2025 school report conducted by the Massachusetts Department of Elementary and Secondary Education, East Boston High is made up of 22.4% special education students.

Bilingual education classes are also offered.

East Boston High has an Army Junior Reserve Officers' Training Corps, known simply as JROTC, that students may take voluntarily. The program includes competitive rifle and drill teams.

East Boston High previously had a professional partnership school with Harvard University Graduate School of Education's Teacher Education Program.

In 1996 and 2001, the architect Doris Cole led the design of renovations to the school.

== Student body ==
As of 2024–2025, the school is 1,252 students. Within the enrollment, 83.2% were identified as Hispanic, 5.0% as African American, 9.0% as White, 1.3% as Asian, and the rest as Pacific Islander, Native American, and multiracial.

== Athletics ==
East Boston High School offers a range of sports. They include boys' football, basketball, baseball, and soccer along with girls' basketball, soccer, softball, and volleyball. The school's hockey, indoor track, outdoor track, and swimming teams are co-educational. Teams compete within the Boston City League of the Massachusetts Interscholastic Athletic Association (MIAA).

East Boston High School has competed in 4 State Championships for Boys Basketball and won them

- 1985: East Boston 59-46 Bartlett
- 1986: East Boston 69-66 Millbury
- 1992: East Boston 59-51 Athol
- 1999: East Boston 62-57 Quabbin

East Boston Head Coach at the time was Mike Rubin Sr. Leading East Boston to 4 Division 2 State Championships. He has led them to countless North Sectional Finals

- 1985: East Boston 64-37 North Andover
- 1986: East Boston 69-54 Swampscott
- 1990: Salem 68-66 East Boston
- 1992: East Boston 69-60 Bishop Fenwick
- 1999: East Boston 69-66 Westford Academy
- 2002: Charlestown 89-63 East Boston
- 2003: Charlestown 82-67 East Boston

He would step down in 2003 taking the headmaster position in East Boston High School.

East Boston would still go on to make sectional finals

- 2004: East Boston 50-48 Salem but would go on to lose in the final four
- 2005: Charlestown 74-72 East Boston

Since 2005 East Boston has yet to reach a Sectional Final

East Boston boys soccer has made sectional finals, semi finals, and Final Fours.

- 1986 East Boston defeated Hamilton-Wenham 4–1 in the North Division 3 final but would go on to lose in the final four.
- 1987 East Boston would make the North Division 3 final but would lose this time to St. Mary's 2–1.
- 2018 East Boston would make the North Division 1 semifinals but would lose 2–1 to St. John's Prep.
- 2024 East Boston would be the #4 seed in the Statewide Division 4 State Tournament. East Boston would make the final four but would lose in double overtime to Cohasset 2-1 (2OT).

East Boston boys football has made many EMass Championships in the 1980s-2000's.

- 1986: Division 5 Eastern Mass. Final Greater Lowell 12-10 East Boston
- 1994: Division 5A Eastern Mass. Final East Boston 18-14 West Roxbury
- 1995: Division 5B Eastern Mass. Final Nantucket 40-6 East Boston
- 1999: Division 5A Eastern Mass. Final Martha's Vineyard 27-12 East Boston
- 2000: Division 5B Eastern Mass. Final Greater Lowell 45-18 East Boston
- 2004: Division 3A Eastern Mass. Final East Boston 28-22 North Shore
- 2007: Division 3A Eastern Mass. Final Greater Lawrence 19-6 East Boston
- 2009: Division 4 Eastern Mass. Final Whittier RVT 14-12 East Boston.

East Boston has won 2 Eastern Massachusetts Championships in the 8 Eastern Massachusetts finals they have been in.

East Boston baseball has also made sectional finals or playoffs runs. In 1981 they made the Division 2 South Final

- 1981: East Boston 6-5 Boston Latin (10Inn.)

East Boston defeated Boston Latin in the final after 10 Innings but would lose the final four.

In 1987 East Boston would make the Division 3 North Final against St. Mary's

- 1987 St. Mary's 5-3 East Boston

St. Mary's defeated East Boston in the final and would eventually go on to win the Division 3 Championship.

In 2016 East Boston would go on to make the Division 3 North Semi Finals this was their path

- RO16 #4 East Boston 4-3 #13 Amesbury
- QF #4 East Boston 5-4 #5 St. Mary's Lynn
- SF #1 North Reading 14-7 #4 East Boston

East Boston Softball has had 1 Appearance in the Division 3 North Final. They lost in the final to Austin Prep.

- 2005 Austin Prep 7-2 East Boston

== Notable faculty ==
- Annissa Essaibi George (social studies)

== Notable alumni ==
- Will Blalock (transferred), professional basketball player
- Letterio Calapai (1923), artist
- Enrico Cappucci, politician
- James Crowley (1905), college basketball coach
- Adio diBiccari (1932), sculptor
- Frank A. Goodwin (1892), politician
- Salvatore LaMattina (1978), politician
- Michele McPhee (1988), journalist
- Johnny Rae (1952), musician
- Frank Renzulli (1975), actor
- Mario Umana (1932), politician
- John Varone (1954), professional football player
- Jermaine Wiggins (1993), professional football player
- Phillip R. Brangiforte (1986), Headmaster East Boston High School 2013-Present
