= Letterio Calapai =

American artist

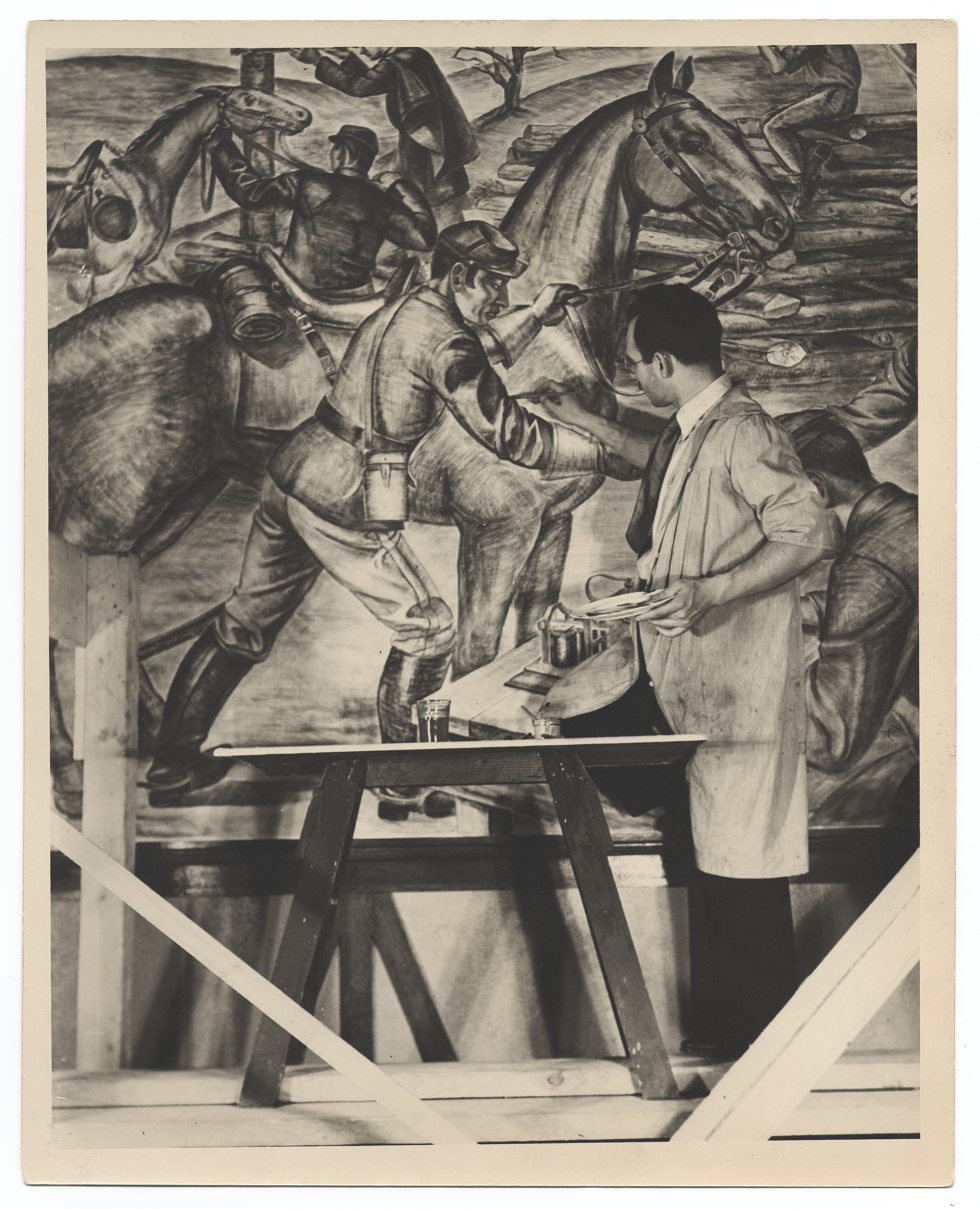
- Calapai working on a mural for the Works Progress Administration in New York City in circa 1937.
- Born: March 29, 1901; Boston, Massachusetts, United States
- Died: March 29, 1993 (aged 92); Glencoe, Illinois, United States
- Education: Massachusetts Normal Art School
- Movement: Realism
- Patrons: Charles Hopkinson; Stanley William Hayter

Letterio "Leo" Calapai (March 29, 1901–March 29, 1993) was an American artist and educator, who identified with the Realism movement. Calapai completed works of art for the Federal Arts Project, which was organized by the Works Progress Administration in the late 1930s and early 1940s.

== Early years ==
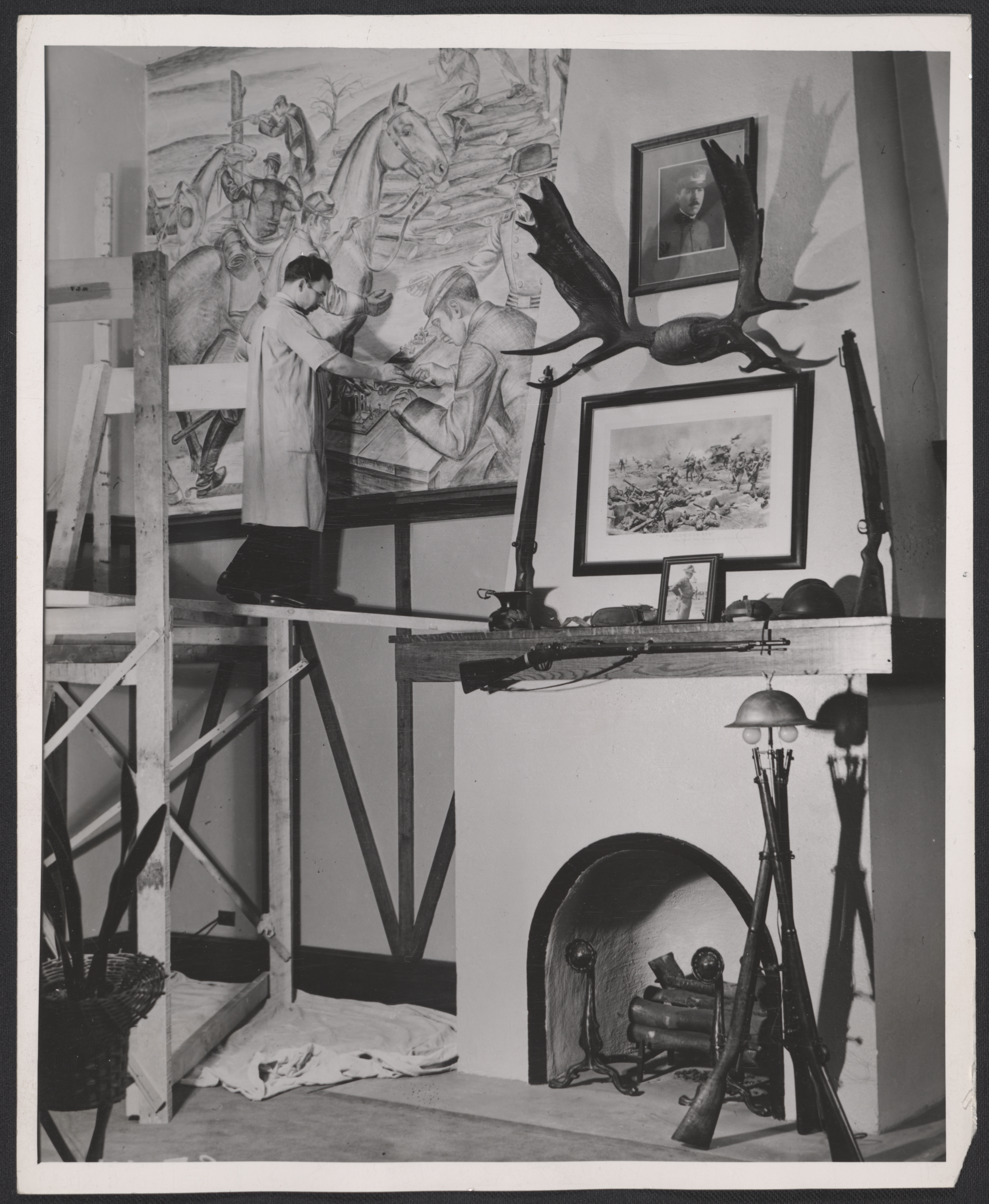
Calapai at work in circa 1937.

A native of Boston and born to Sicilian immigrants, Calapai graduated from East Boston High School in 1923, where an interest in art grew. He then received a degree in painting from the Massachusetts Normal Art School in 1925, and is known to have later worked under Charles Hopkinson, who later financially supported his work. In 1928, Calapai moved to New York City to pursue a career in lithography, and continued to take courses at the American Artists School, the Beaux-Arts Institute of Design, and The Art Students League of New York.

In 1933, Calapai completed his first solo exhibition at the Montross Gallery in New York. In the following year, he began expanding his work in the media of printmaking, and used the works of writers William Carlos Williams and Thomas Wolfe as artistic influence.

Between 1935 and 1943, Calapai completed works for the Federal Art Project of the Works Progress Administration.

== Professional career ==
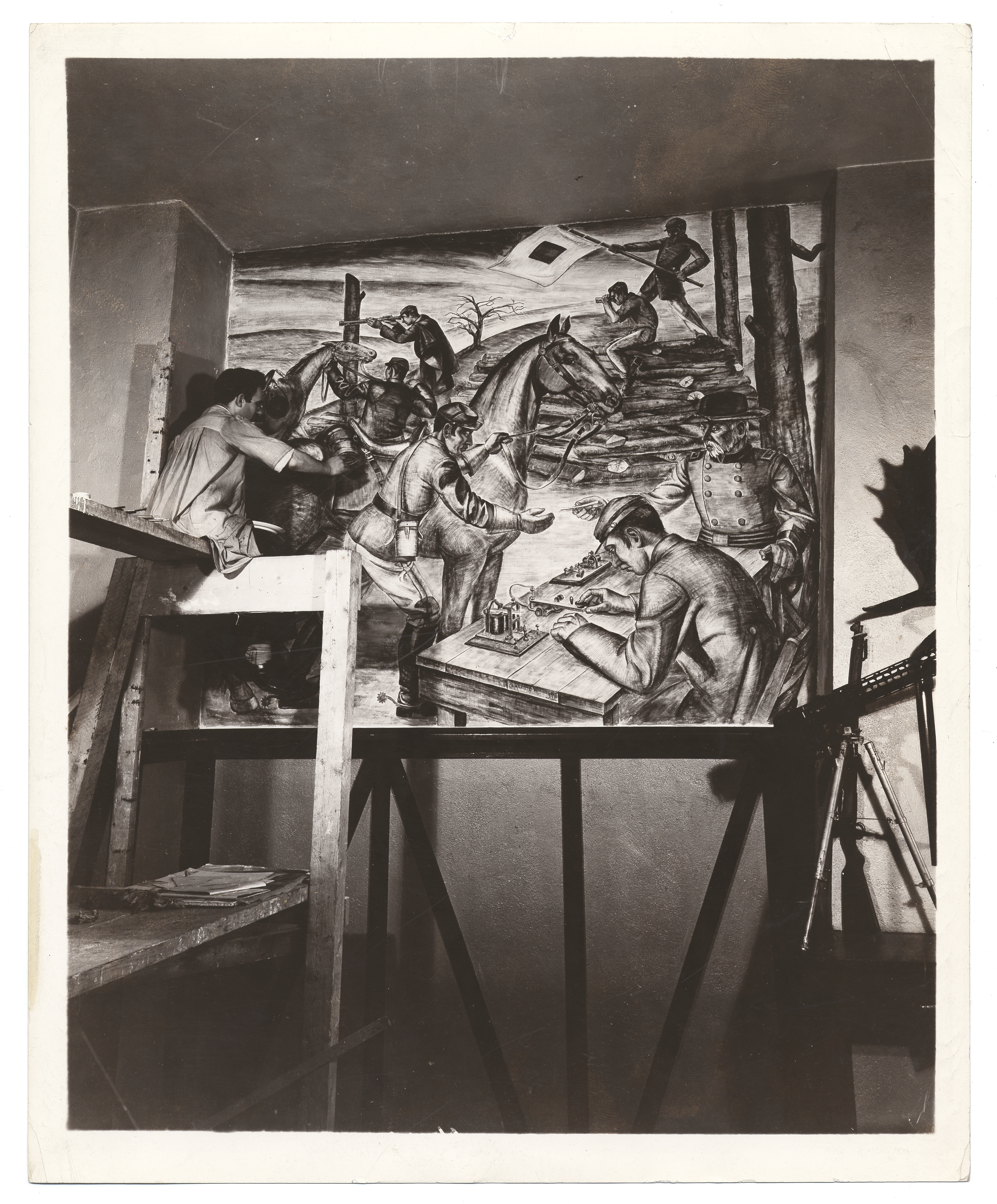
Calapai completing a work of art in circa 1937.

From 1946 to 1949, Calapai worked at Atelier 17, a printmaking studio in New York, where he also met Emma Amos. With the recommendation of fellow printmaker Stanley William Hayter, Calapai was hired to establish a printmaking department at the University at Buffalo, where he would hold the most of chair until 1955, when he returned to the city. Due to Hayter, Calapai also became interested in social realism, German Expressionism, and Post-Expressionism.

In 1948, Calapai produced an illustration for the Rivers of America Series.

In 1960, Calapai established a printmaking workshop in the neighborhood of Greenwich Village, and continued to teach at such institutions as Brandeis University, New York University, and The New School for Social Research from 1955 to 1965. He wed Jean Hillard on Jan 5, 1962. Calapai also joined the Society of American Graphic Artists. That year, Calapai moved to Chicago to teach at the University of Illinois. He would then set up a studio in nearby Glencoe.

Calapai died on his 92nd birthday in Glencoe in 1993.

== Legacy ==
The New York Times art critic, Stuart Preston, described Calapai's works as "cataclysmic...scenes, emotional in color, form and design."

Calapai's works can be found in a number of museums in the United States, including the Art Institute of Chicago, Baltimore Art Museum, Brauer Museum of Art, Crystal Bridges Museum of American Art, Davis Museum, Flint Institute of Arts, Harvard Art Museums, Museum of Fine Arts, Boston, Metropolitan Museum of Art, National Gallery of Art, Palmer Museum of Art, and the Worcester Art Museum. Outside of the United States, Capalai's art is also in the Bibliothèque Nationale de France.

== See also ==
- List of Federal Art Project artists
