= Joe McKenney =

American football player and coach (1905–1995)

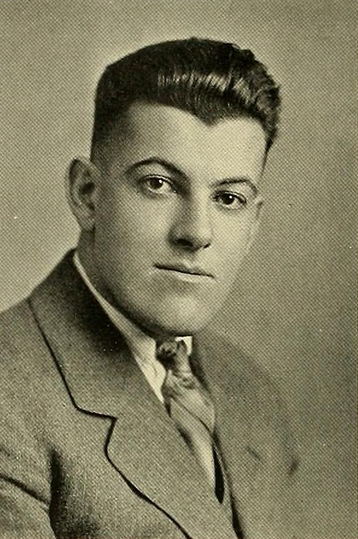
- McKenney pictured in Sub Turri 1927, Boston College yearbook

Biographical details
- Born: March 1, 1905; Boston, Massachusetts, U.S.
- Died: May 17, 1995 (aged 90); Waltham, Massachusetts, U.S.

Playing career
- 1923–1926: Boston College
- Position: Quarterback

Coaching career (HC unless noted)
- 1927: Boston College (assistant)
- 1928–1934: Boston College

Head coaching record
- Overall: 44–18–3

Joseph McKenney (March 1, 1905 – May 17, 1995) was an American football player, coach, and official. He served as the head football coach at Boston College from 1928 to 1934, compiling a record of 44–18–3. McKenney also played at Boston College and was the starting quarterback for the Eagles from 1923 to 1926.

== Early life ==
McKenney was born and raised in Brighton, Massachusetts and was a baseball, football and track star at Brighton High School. He was an all-scholastic end in 1920 and 1921 as well as an all-scholastic pitcher. When McKenney graduated from BHS in 1923, he was invited to the Harvard Club by his principal. There he was presented with a $1,000 scholarship and McKenney, who grew up close to Harvard Stadium and was a former Crimson mascot, accepted without telling his parents. When his mother read about his going to Harvard in the Boston Post, she told him that he must go to a Catholic school or go to work.

== Boston College ==
McKenney played quarterback and punter for Boston College and was team captain during their undefeated 1926 season. He was the starting all four years he played for the Eagles. An injury suffered during his high school football career prevented him from pitching for the Boston College Eagles baseball team, however in 1927 he returned to the diamond as an outfielder.

McKenney was the offensive backfield coach under D. Leo Daley in 1927. He was promoted the following season to head coach. At 22 years old he was the youngest head coach in college football. He compiled a 44–18–3 record in his seven seasons as head coach. He supplemented his income by serving as a professor of modern history at BC and taking outside jobs, including as a salesman for the Boston Coal Company.

== Boston Public Schools ==
In 1935, McKenney was appointed to the Boston Finance Commission by Governor Charles F. Hurley. However, after the sudden death of James Crowley the following month, McKenney resigned from the commission and ended his coaching career to become the associate director of physical education of Boston Public Schools. Although the position paid less than his other jobs combined, it was seen as more stable. In 1945 he was promoted to director of physical education. In this role, McKenney increased the number of coaches for all sports, added golf and tennis programs, created a fund for injured athletes, and instituted athletic programs for elementary and middle schools. Along with his assistant, William H. Ohrenberger, McKenney oversaw the construction White Stadium. In 1966, McKenney was appointed director of personnel relations for Boston Public Schools. He was a key figure in the administration of superintendent William H. Ohrenberger, a former teammate of McKenney's and his former associate director of physical education. McKenney retired in 1970.

== Football official ==
From 1936 to 1945, McKenney was a linesman for college football games. He also served as a linesman for the American Football League and National Football League games. In 1988 he received the National Football Foundation's Outstanding Football Official Award.

== Construction of Alumni Stadium ==
From 1938 to 1948, McKenney was a member of the Metropolitan District Commission. In 1942 he arranged for Boston College to acquire a reservoir near the campus from the MDC once it was declared inactive in exchange for his support on a similar agreement for Tufts University. The reservoir was declared inactive in 1948 and was acquired by Boston College the following year. In the Boston Red Sox announced they would no longer allow Boston College to play football at Fenway Park, McKenney led the fundraising drive for a new football stadium, which would be constructed on the land previously acquired from the MDC. When Alumni Stadium opened in 1957, McKenney was the master of ceremonies.

== Boston Beacons ==
McKenney was the vice president and general manager of the Boston Beacons of the North American Soccer League. The team folded after a single season (1968).

== Later life ==
In 1983, McKenney was awarded an honorary degree from Boston College. McKenney has the distinction of being the only person in American college history to serve as captain his football team, head coach of his football team, elected president of his college's alumni association, and receive an honorary degree from the school. He was a season ticket holder for BC football until his death on May 17, 1995, at Maristhill Nursing Home in Waltham, Massachusetts.

== Head coaching record ==
Year	Team	Overall	Conference	Standing	Bowl/playoffs
Boston College Eagles (Independent) (1928–1924)
1928	Boston College	9–0			
1929	Boston College	7–2–1			
1930	Boston College	5–5			
1931	Boston College	6–4			
1932	Boston College	4–2–2			
1933	Boston College	8–1			
1934	Boston College	5–4			
Boston College:		44–18–3			
Total:		44–18–3			
