= D. Leo Daley =

American football player and coach (1895–1979)

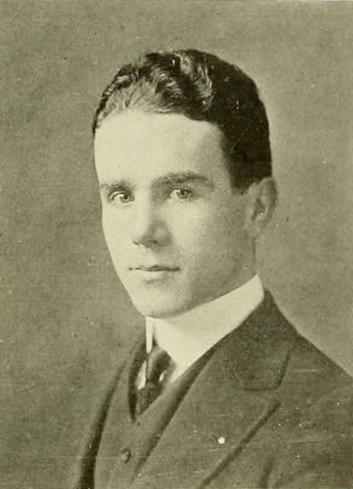
- Daley pictured in Sub Turri 1916, Boston College yearbook

Biographical details
- Born: March 26, 1895; Boston, Massachusetts, U.S.
- Died: August 19, 1979 (aged 84); Hyannis, Massachusetts, U.S.
- Education: Boston Normal School

Playing career
- 1912–1915: Boston College
- Position: Guard

Coaching career (HC unless noted)
- 1916–1917: South Boston HS (MA)
- 1919–1920: Boston College HS (MA)
- 1921–1924: Hyde Park HS (MA)
- 1925–1926: Boston English HS (MA)
- 1927: Boston College
- 1928–1931: Boston English HS (MA)

Head coaching record
- Overall: 4–4 (college)

Daniel Leo Daley (March 26, 1895 – August 19, 1979) was an American football player and coach. He served as the head football coach at Boston College in 1927, compiling a record of 4–4. He was also a longtime Boston Public Schools employee, serving as a coach, teacher, junior master, headmaster, and assistant superintendent.

== Athletic career ==
A graduate of the Boston Latin School, Daley attended Boston College, where he was a three-year starter at guard and elected captain as a sophomore in 1913. He also earned varsity letters in track and baseball. He graduated from BC in 1915 and then spent a year at the Boston Normal School.

== High school coaching ==
In 1916 he became the football coach at South Boston High School. His missed the 1918 season due to service in the United States Navy, but he returned to coaching after World War I, this time with Boston College High School. After two successful seasons as BC High, Daley moved on to Hyde Park High School, where he developed three future Boston College players. In 1925 he became the head football and baseball coach at the English High School of Boston in 1925. Daley's 1926 team won the city football championship. From 1920 to 1926 he also coached Pere Marquette, a semipro team made up of college graduates and former high school stars which won the New England championship.

== Boston College ==
In 1926, Boston College adopted a policy of hiring graduates to coach their athletic teams. On December 23, 1926, Daley became the first BC graduate to become full-time head football coach. He was given a one-year contract. Despite losing four-year starting quarterback Joe McKenney and having only 12 returning lettermen, Daley coached his team to a respectable 4–4 record. Daley, however, decided to return to coaching at English after his only season as BC coach as was replaced by assistant Joe McKenney. After the season, Daley, who was on a leave of absence from his position as a junior master in the Boston Public School system, chose not to renew his contract and returned to Boston English.

== Later life ==
Daley retired from coaching in 1932, but remained with the Boston public school system. From 1932 to 1937 he was the head history department at the Mechanic Arts High School. In 1937 took the same position at the English High School. In 1943 he was appointed headmaster of the Mechanic Arts High School. In 1948 he became an assistant superintendent for the Boston public school district. He retired in 1961.

After leaving coaching, Daley was a high school and college football official. He was the umpire at the 1948 Cotton Bowl Classic. He also served as President of the Boston College Varsity Club. He was inducted into the Boston College Varsity Club Athletic Hall of Fame in 1978.

Following his retirement, Daley resided in Harwich, Massachusetts. He died on August 19, 1979, at Cape Cod Hospital.

== Head coaching record ==
=== College ===
Year	Team	Overall	Conference	Standing	Bowl/playoffs
Boston College Eagles (Independent) (1927)
1927	Boston College	4–4			
Boston College:		4–4			
Total:		4–4			
