= William Coady =

American basketball official, coach, and player

Biographical details
- Died: July 3, 1964 (aged 88); Cambridge, Massachusetts, U.S.

Coaching career (HC unless noted)
- 1921–1925: Boston College

Head coaching record
- Overall: 21–20

William F. Coady was an American basketball official, coach, and player.

Coady played guard for the East Boston Catholic Literature Association's basketball team, which traveled the eastern United States playing clubs such as the Buffalo Germans and the Troy Trojans. He was the coach of the Boston College Eagles men's basketball team from 1921 until the basketball program was dropped in 1925. He had a 21–20 record in his four seasons as BC basketball coach. He also served as an assistant football coach under Frank Cavanaugh. After leaving B.C., Coady refereed college, high school, and amateur basketball games in Massachusetts. He would often referee two games a night during the basketball season while also working in the mornings a commission merchant in a produce market. He died on July 3, 1964, at his home in Cambridge, Massachusetts. He was 88 years old.
