= James Crowley (mathematician) =

American mathematician

James M. Crowley (born 19 February 1949) is an American mathematician currently at Society for Industrial and Applied Mathematics and an Elected Fellow to the American Association for the Advancement of Science.

After graduating with a bachelor's degree in mathematics from the College of the Holy Cross, Crowley graduated in 1972 with an M.S. from Virginia Tech. From 1972 to 1977 he was a mathematician working for the U. S. Air Force Foreign Technology Division. From 1977 to 1986 he was an associate professor at the U.S. Air Force Academy. At Brown University he studied from 1978 to 1981, graduating in 1982 with doctoral thesis Numerical Methods Of Parameter Identification For Problems Arising In Elasticity under the supervision of Harvey Thomas Banks. After another four years (from 1986 to 1990) of work for the U. S. Air Force, Crowley was a program manager at DARPA from 1992 to 1994. He then became the SIAM executive director and has continued in that post until the present. In 2012 he was elected a Fellow of the American Mathematical Society.
