= James Crowley (coach) =

American basketball coach and physician education instructor

Biographical details
- Born: January 5, 1888; Boston, Massachusetts, U.S.
- Died: February 7, 1935 (aged 47); Boston, Massachusetts, U.S.

Coaching career (HC unless noted)

Basketball
- 1905–1907: Boston College

Head coaching record
- Overall: 9–21 (college basketball)

James Henry Crowley (January 5, 1888 – February 7, 1935) was an American basketball coach and physical education instructor, who served as head coach of the Boston College Eagles and associate director of physical education for Boston Public Schools.

== Career ==
=== Early career ===
Born in the North End neighborhood of Boston, Crowley graduated from East Boston High School in 1905. At East Boston High, he was a standout center on the basketball team. On December 20, 1905, Crowley scored a career-high 95 points in a game against Chelsea High School. He then took a two-year course at the Posse-Nissen Physical Education School in Boston, and played amateur basketball as a member of the East Boston Athletic Association.

=== Boston College ===
In 1905, Crowley became the second-ever head coach of the Boston College varsity basketball team. From 1905 to 1907, the school performed poorly on the court with only 9 wins and 21 losses.

=== Boston Public Schools ===
On May 8, 1908, Crowley was hired as an athletic coach and physical education instructor at the High School of Commerce in Boston. While there, he coached basketball and baseball, both of which won championships. Two years later, Crowley was transferred to The English High School. The following year, he was put in charge of physical education at the school. In 1912, Crowley was transferred to West Roxbury High School, where he coached baseball. Crowley later coached at East Boston High School and Jamaica Plain High School.

In 1925, Crowley was promoted to assistant director of physical education for the Boston Public Schools. A year later, he is credited with introducing soccer to the curriculum, which soon gained popularity, as within a year, around 15,000 students turned out for the sport. On February 5, 1934, Crowley succeeded Frederick J. O’Brien as associate director of physical education for the school district.

=== Death ===
On January 28, 1935, Crowley entered Boston City Hospital for surgery to treat a long-term illness. On February 7, 1935, he jumped from the window of his hospital room and fell fifty feet onto a concrete tunnel. Crowley was treated for internal injuries such as a fractured skull and ribs, but was soon pronounced dead. He was succeeded in his education role by Joe McKenney.
