= Shea Rowing Center =

Boathouse in Princeton, New Jersey

Coordinates: 40.339455°N 74.650702°W

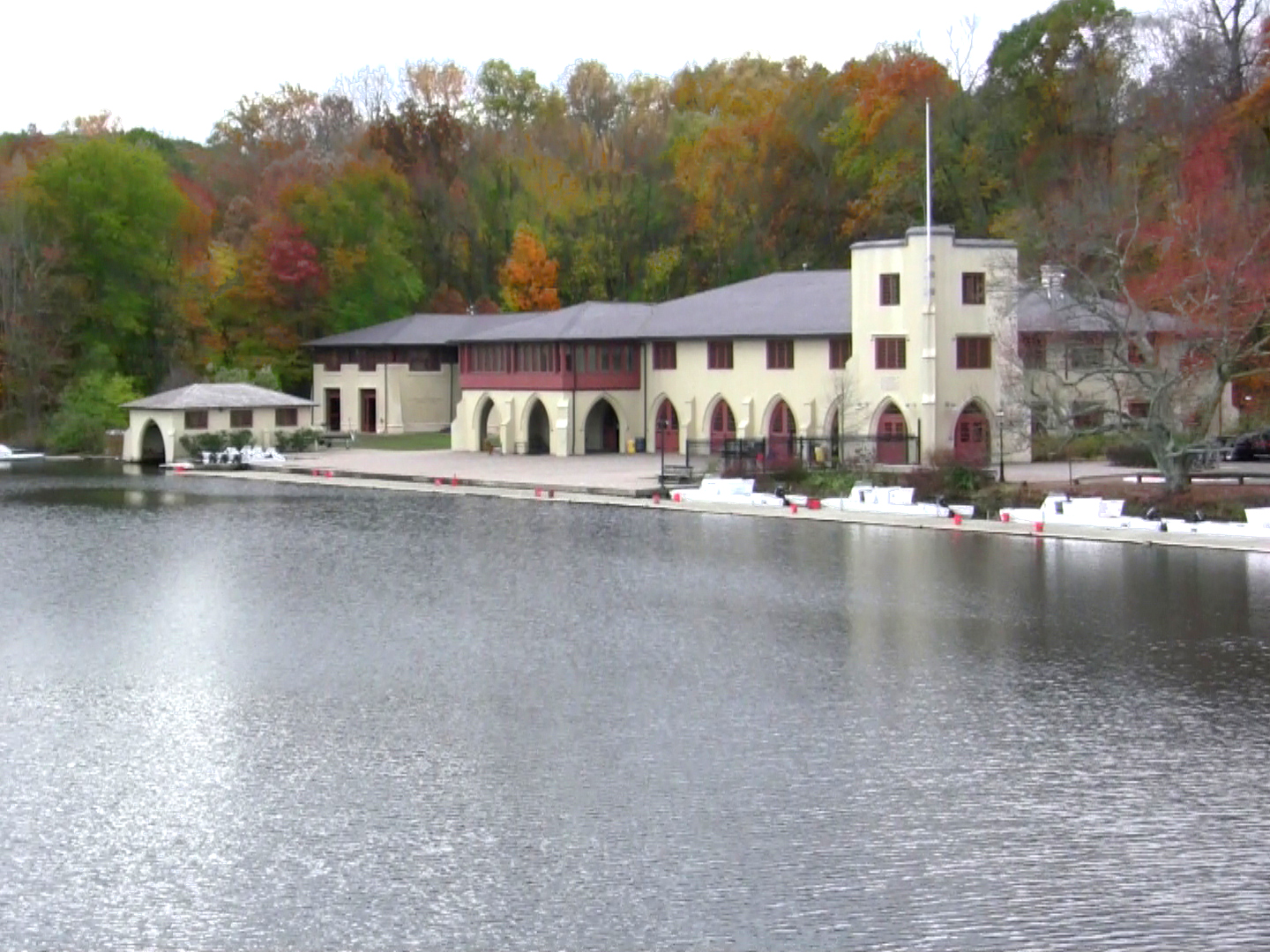
The C. Bernard Shea Rowing Center at Princeton University

The C. Bernard Shea Rowing Center is the boathouse for the Princeton University rowing programs. Located on Lake Carnegie in Princeton, New Jersey, the center consists of the Class of 1887 Boathouse and the Richard Ottesen Prentke ‘67 Training Center. The Shea Center was dedicated on October 7, 2000.

== History ==
Rowing began at Princeton in 1870 with a half-dozen undergraduates and two boats, which the students taught themselves to row on the Delaware and Raritan Canal. By 1874, the Princeton Boating Club had been formed and had obtained a wood-framed boathouse on the canal. But by 1884, the canal had become so busy with steam-powered boat traffic that rowing was forced to cease. Early in the 20th century, former coxswain Howard Russell Butler convinced Andrew Carnegie to create a lake at Princeton. When some lakeside property owners demanded to sell their entire farms, Carnegie balked at providing full financing, Butler and a group of eleven other alumni generously stepped in and purchased over a hundred acres of land, 89 of which were then given to the University. Other alumni gave hundreds of acres of land to the University at the same time. The lake was finally completed in 1906.

With a fine body of water on which to compete, rowing began again in 1911. In 1913, the Class of 1887 Boathouse was donated to the University on the occasion of the 25th reunion of the Class; they had been the last class to row on the Canal. The 22,000-square-foot (2,000 m^{2}) structure initially accommodated only 3 full eights of heavyweight oarsmen.

As Princeton added new rowing programs, the building housed heavyweight, lightweight, women’s and lightweight women’s crew programs. There were a number of piecemeal modifications over the years to accommodate the additional athletes, leaving a building that was maze-like and confusing. By 1997, the boathouse was serving more than 160 athletes on a daily basis, and was packed beyond overflowing. Additionally, the building was falling into disrepair. Indeed, a 1996 meeting of the Princeton University Rowing Association (PURA) was punctuated by a window falling out. Subsequent to this meeting, PURA president Dick Prentke ‘67 initiated the effort to work with University to pursue a full-scale renovation and addition.

PURA turned to architect and former lightweight rower Jeff Peterson ’84 to explore initial concepts for the project. Peterson's firm at that time, Architectural Resources Cambridge, was eventually hired to design the project. After the project, Peterson started Peterson Architects, a firm that focuses primarily on boathouses.

PURA raised more than $8 million from over 1200 donors for the project, including a $4 million gift by Irene C. Shea in memory of her husband C. Bernard Shea ‘1916. Mr. Shea had been a student when the 1887 Boathouse opened and was a fan of rowing and Princeton.

Construction commenced in June 1999. Crews were able to partially occupy the 1887 Boathouse for boat storage in the spring of 2000. The project was completed in time for full occupancy in the fall of 2000.

An unusually heavy rainfall in April 2007 caused the water level in Lake Carnegie to rise several feet, flooding Shea Rowing Center and suspending activities for several days. After the flood, the University engaged Peterson Architects to repair the facility and to mitigate potential damage from future floods.

== Design ==
The C. Bernard Shea Rowing Center serves as a gateway to the Princeton Campus, the first visible buildings when approaching from the east. The center consists of the original Class of 1887 Boathouse (22,000 s.f.) and the Richard Ottesen Prentke Training Center (13,500 s.f.). To achieve architectural consistency, the newer Prentke Center reiterates the bay spacing, hipped roofs, and tripartite window configurations of the original building. The tower of the 1887 Boathouse is the center's entry and focal point. On its second floor, it features a double-height sky-lit space with mahogany flooring, benches and wainscoting. A gallery extending to the west features historical photographs, overlooks the lake and provides access to shower and locker facilities. The gallery arrives at a grand open-timbered club room with lounge seating, trophy cases, and video facilities. The Prentke Center includes two bays for small boats, and a moving-water rowing tank. In the tank, the broadly arched window evokes the arches of the Washington Street Bridge. The upper level contains three large workout spaces framed with heavy timber trusses. These rooms are finished with mahogany wainscot and athletic rubber flooring.

== Awards ==
The Shea Rowing Center has won a number of architectural design awards, including a 2005 Boston Society of Architects Honor Award for Design and a 2001 Facility of Merit Award from Athletic Business Magazine. It was also recognized by Boathouse Finder as a building of outstanding “Architectural Achievement.”
