= Al McClellan =

American basketball coach (1896–1962)

Biographical details
- Born: April 8, 1896; Burlington, Vermont, U.S.
- Died: August 23, 1962 (aged 66); Jamaica Plain, Boston, Massachusetts, U.S.
- Education: Mount Saint Joseph College

Coaching career (HC unless noted)
- 1922–1925: Salem HS (MA)
- 1925–1927: St. John's Prep. (MA)
- 1927–1938: Providence
- 1940–1943: Saint Anselm
- 1945–1953: Boston College
- 1953–1956: Belmont Abbey

Head coaching record
- Overall: 320–193 (college)

Albert B. "General" McClellan (April 8, 1896 – August 23, 1962) was a college basketball coach at Providence, St. Anselm, Boston College, and Belmont Abbey.

== Early life ==
McClellan was a standout athlete at St. John's Preparatory School and Mount Saint Joseph College. He pitched in the minor leagues for the Baltimore Orioles of the International League in 1917 and the Waterbury Nattatucks and Hartford Senators of the Eastern League in 1919. During World War I, he served in the United States Navy's aviation corps and was stationed in Pensacola and Charleston. In 1918, he won the high jump competition at the Army–Navy service championships in Baltimore. After leaving the military, McClellan played professional basketball for the Nanticoke and Pittston teams in the Pennsylvania State League.

== Coaching career ==
McClellan began his coaching career in 1922 at Salem High School in Salem, Massachusetts. In 1925, he moved to St. John's Preparatory School in Danvers, Massachusetts, where he compiled a 31-2 record over two years.

McClellan was the head coach at Providence from 1927 to 1938. In his eleven seasons as head coach, the Friars had a 147-65 record. He produced two All-Americans, Ed Wineapple (who also played for McClellan at Salem High) and John Krieger. He resigned after the 1938 season because he refused to take a pay cut as part of the administration's decision to give more money to the football program.

McClellan returned to college basketball in 1940 as the head coach of the St. Anselm Hawks. When Boston College decided to reinstate their basketball team in 1945, McClellan was chosen to coach the revived team. He resigned from his position after the 1953 and became the first head basketball coach at Belmont Abbey College. At the time of his resignation, he was BC's winningest basketball coach. McClellan retired from coaching in 1956.

McClellan died on August 23, 1962, at the age of 63.
