= 2016–17 Georgetown Hoyas men's basketball team =

American college basketball season

2016–17 Georgetown Hoyas men's basketball
- Conference: Big East
- Record: 14–18 (5–13 Big East)
- Head coach: John Thompson III (13th season)
- Assistant coaches: Kevin Broadus; Anthony Solomon; Akbar Waheed
- Captain: Bradley Hayes
- Home arena: Verizon Center

2016–17 Big East men's basketball standings
	Conf.				Overall
Team	W		L	PCT	W		L	PCT
No. 1 Villanova †	15	–	3	.833	32	–	4	.889
No. 21 Butler	12	–	6	.667	25	–	9	.735
Creighton	10	–	8	.556	25	–	10	.714
Seton Hall	10	–	8	.556	21	–	12	.636
Providence	10	–	8	.556	20	–	13	.606
Marquette	10	–	8	.556	19	–	13	.594
Xavier	9	–	9	.500	24	–	14	.632
St. John's	7	–	11	.389	14	–	19	.424
Georgetown	5	–	13	.278	14	–	18	.438
DePaul	2	–	16	.111	9	–	23	.281
† 2017 Big East tournament winner Rankings from AP poll

The 2016–17 Georgetown Hoyas men's basketball team represented Georgetown University in the 2016–17 NCAA Division I men's basketball season. The Hoyas, led by 13th-year head coach John Thompson III, played their home games at the Verizon Center in Washington, D.C., and were members of the Big East Conference.

The season saw the return of Jonathan Wallace, the Hoyas′ standout point guard from 2004 to 2008, to the basketball program as a special assistant after eight seasons playing professional basketball in the NBA Summer League, the National Basketball Association Developmental League, Belgium, Germany, and Angola.

The Hoyas finished the season at 14–18, 5–13 in Big East play, to finish in ninth place in the conference. As the No. 9 seed in the Big East tournament, they lost in the first round to St. John's. Georgetown finished the season with a losing record for the second straight year, the first time that had happened since the 1972 and 1973 seasons, and without an invitation to a postseason tournament in consecutive years for the first time since 1972 and 1973.

On March 23, 2017, Georgetown officials announced that John Thompson III had been fired. On April 2, it was reported that Basketball Hall of Famer and Georgetown alumnus Patrick Ewing would replace Thompson as head coach.

== Previous season ==
The Hoyas finished the 2015–16 season 15–18, 7–11 in Big East play to finish in eighth place. They defeated DePaul in the first round of the Big East tournament to advance to the quarterfinals where they lost to Villanova. For the first time in John Thompson III's twelve years as head coach, the Hoyas did not make a postseason tournament.

== Preseason ==
Prior to the season, Georgetown was picked to finish in a tie for fourth place in a poll of Big East coaches. Isaac Copeland was named to the preseason All-Big East second team and L. J. Peak received an Honorable Mention.

== Departures ==
Name	Number	Pos.	Height	Weight	Year	Hometown	Notes
D'Vauntes Smith-Rivera	4	G	6'3"	215	Senior	Indianapolis, IN	Graduated
Paul White	13	F	6'8"	230	Sophomore	Chicago, IL	Transferred to Oregon
Riyan Williams	21	G	6'4"	185	Senior	Dunkirk, MD	Graduated; transferred to Goldey–Beacom

=== Incoming transfers ===
Name	Number	Pos.	Height	Weight	Year	Hometown	Notes
Jonathan Mulmore	2	G	6'4"	185	Junior	New Orleans, LA	Junior-college transfer from Allegany College; eligible to play immediately.
Rodney Pryor	23	G	6'5"	205	RS Senior	Evanston, IL	Transferred from Robert Morris. Eligible to play immediately because he had graduated from Robert Morris.

== Incoming recruits ==
College recruiting
Name	Hometown	School	Height	Weight	Commit date
Jagan Mosley #30 SG	Morganville, NJ	St. Anthony High School	6 ft 3 in (1.91 m)	185 lb (84 kg)	Aug 10, 2015
Jagan Mosley #30 SG	Recruit ratings: Scout: Rivals: (80)				
Overall recruit ranking:
Note: In many cases, Scout, Rivals, 247Sports, On3, and ESPN may conflict in their listings of height and weight.; In these cases, the average was taken. ESPN grades are on a 100-point scale.; Sources: "2016 Team Ranking". Rivals.

== Future recruits ==
=== 2017–18 team recruits ===
College recruiting
Name	Hometown	School	Height	Weight	Commit date
Tremont Waters; PG	West Haven, CT	Notre Dame High School	5 ft 11 in (1.80 m)	160 lb (73 kg)	Oct 19, 2016
Tremont Waters; PG	Recruit ratings: Scout: Rivals: (89)				
Antwan Walker; PF	Washington, D.C.	Hargrave Military Academy	6 ft 7 in (2.01 m)	215 lb (98 kg)	Oct 25, 2016
Antwan Walker; PF	Recruit ratings: Scout: Rivals: (81)				
Overall recruit ranking:
Note: In many cases, Scout, Rivals, 247Sports, On3, and ESPN may conflict in their listings of height and weight.; In these cases, the average was taken. ESPN grades are on a 100-point scale.; Sources: "2017 Team Ranking". Rivals.

== Season recap ==
Georgetown had lost three players since the conclusion of the previous season. Little-used walk-on senior guard Riyan Williams – the son of Georgetown great Reggie Williams – had graduated with a year of college eligibility remaining and chose to transfer to NCAA Division II Goldey-Beacom College to play his final year of college basketball, and sophomore forward Paul White, the team's leading scorer off the bench during his freshman year but limited by a hip injury to seven games during the 2015–2016 season, had transferred to Oregon at the end of August 2016. By far the team's biggest loss, however, was guard D'Vauntes Smith-Rivera, whose graduation in 2016 left the Hoyas without their leading scorer of the past three seasons. Although a natural shooting guard who finished his college career as Georgetown's fifth-leading all-time scorer and with more three-pointers made than any previous Hoya, Smith-Rivera had also served as the team's point guard for the past two seasons, and the team keenly felt the loss of both his scoring ability and his in-game leadership.

At forward, senior Reggie Cameron, juniors Isaac Copeland, Trey Mourning, and L. J. Peak, and sophomores Marcus Derrickson and Kaleb Johnson all returned for 2016–2017. Junior guard Tre Campbell and sophomore center Jesse Govan also came back for another season. Forward Akoy Agau, who had transferred from Louisville in January 2015 and had planned to begin play for Georgetown in January 2016 after sitting out the two full semesters the National Collegiate Athletic Association mandated for transferring players, had missed the entire 2015–2016 season while recovering from knee surgery, but he finally would make his Georgetown debut in 2016–2017 as a redshirt junior. A surprise returnee from the previous season was fifth-year senior center Bradley Hayes; he was due to graduate in 2016, and virtually everyone, including Hayes himself, believed as the 2015–2016 season came to an end that his college career was over. However, John Thompson III applied for an NCAA waiver that would allow Hayes to return for a fifth year as a redshirt senior in 2016–2017 because he had played in only nine games and for only 14 minutes during his freshman year and had a semester to go to complete his degree. The NCAA granted the waiver, provided that Hayes sat out the first four games of the 2016–2017 season. The team's former student manager, junior guard Ra'Mond Hines, who had made the team for the first time as a walk-on late the previous season, also returned to the team for 2016–2017, again as a walk-on.

Two freshmen joined the team, guard Jagan Moseley and walk-on forward George Muresan, the son of former National Basketball Association center Gheorghe Muresan. Also arriving for the year were two upperclassmen. Guard Rodney Pryor had transferred from Robert Morris and was eligible to play for Georgetown immediately as a redshirt senior because he had graduated from Robert Morris the previous spring. Junior guard Jonathan Mulmore, a junior college transfer from Allegany College of Maryland, also joined the team.

The 2016–2017 squad's athleticism raised the prospect of Georgetown playing a more uptempo game than had been the custom during the 12 previous seasons under John Thompson III, who favored the more deliberate "Princeton offense"; during the offseason, Thompson had revamped his coaching staff and discussed at length the idea of adopting his system to accommodate a new style of play, promising a faster team. Although the shadow of the losing season the previous year hung over the returning players, the 2016–2017 season began with qualified optimism because of the number of experienced players on the roster and Georgetown's size relative to other teams in the Big East, which had lost a number of notable "big men" over the offseason. At least some observers considered Georgetown's frontcourt a strength and deemed it unlikely that Georgetown would suffer through another uncharacteristically mediocre season because of the Hoyas′ pattern of recurring success over many years and quick recoveries from the occasional poor seasons. But the Hoyas faced a particularly challenging early nonconference schedule, and the departure of Smith-Rivera left questions as to how well the backcourt would perform and who would step up to lead the team.

=== Nonconference schedule ===
Georgetown began its season by defeating South Carolina Upstate in a game at the Verizon Center in which the Hoyas started only one player (Isaac Copeland) who had started their final game of the previous season. Georgetown displayed a very different style of play from that seen previously under John Thompson III, with frequent presses and more running, and won 105–60. It was Georgetown's greatest offensive output since the Hoyas scored 111 points against Missouri in an overtime victory on November 30, 2010, the fifth time the Hoyas had scored 100 or more points in a game during John Thompson III's 13 seasons as head coach, and the third-highest scoring output of Thompson's tenure. It was the highest-scoring season opener under Thompson, the first 100-plus-point season opener for Georgetown since they beat NCAA Division III Marymount 108–47 to start the 2001–2002 season, and the first time the Hoyas had scored 100 points or more in a season opener against an NCAA Division I opponent since defeating Colgate 106–57 to begin the 1995–1996 season. Making his Hoya debut, Rodney Pryor sank a career-high six three-pointers on eight attempts from beyond the arc. and shot 13-of-16 (81.3 percent) from the field overall on the way to a 32-point game. Pryor scored 26 points in the first half alone, and the 68 points the Hoyas scored by halftime set a school record for first-half points, eclipsing the 57 points they scored in the first half against Savannah State on December 8, 2008, and it was the highest-scoring half for Georgetown in the 21st century to that point. Overall, the Hoyas shot 66.7 percent from the field, and L. J. Peak scored 14 points against the Spartans, Jesse Govan had 11, Isaac Copeland scored 10, and Tre Campbell came off the bench to add 10.

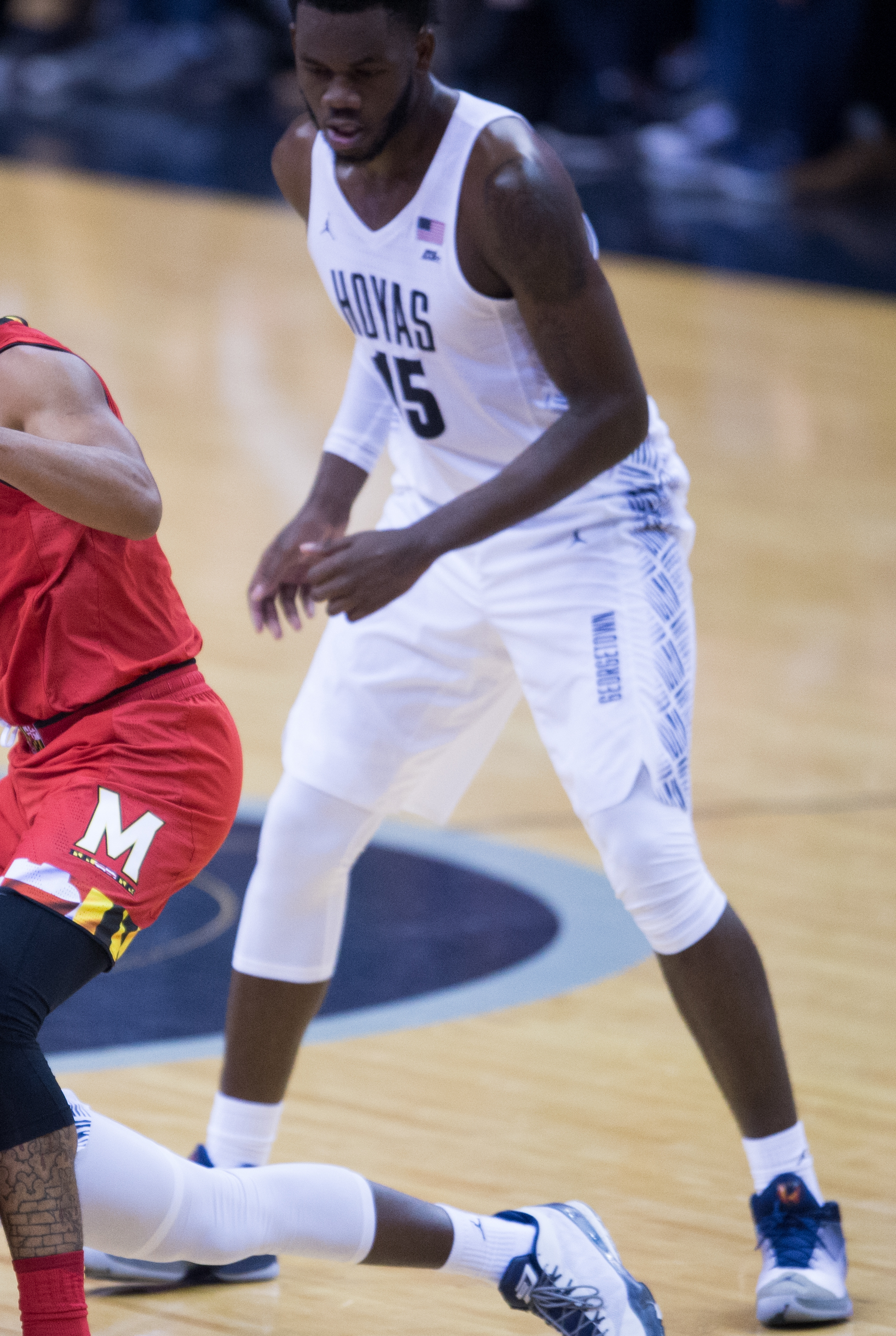
Center Jessie Govan in action against Maryland at the Verizon Center in Washington, D.C., on November 15, 2016.

Three days later, Georgetown took part in the annual Gavitt Tipoff Games, a series of eight games per year between teams of the Big East Conference and Big Ten Conference. For the second straight year, Georgetown drew Maryland as its Big Ten opponent, hosting the Terrapins at the Verizon Center – the first time the Hoyas had hosted the Terrapins since 1993. The Hoyas made 37 of their 42 free throws but blew a 68–59 lead with 2:21 remaining as Maryland went on a 17–7 scoring run the rest of the way to win the game, 76–75, defeating Georgetown for the second season in a row. Maryland's players stormed the court to celebrate the victory. Scoring 21 points, L. J. Peak led a balanced Georgetown attack which also saw Rodney Pryor score 14 points, Isaac Copeland finish with a double-double (13 points and 13 rebounds), and Jesse Govan add 12 points.

Next up for the Hoyas was the Maui Invitational Tournament. Georgetown began the tournament by hosting a non-bracketed opening-round game against Arkansas State at McDonough Gymnasium, the Hoyas′ first game on campus since the 2014 National Invitation Tournament. The Hoyas shot only 3-for-18 (16.7 percent) from three-point range and, despite Jesse Govan's 20 points, L. J. Peak's 18, and Isaac Copeland's 11, the Red Wolves led by double figures for much of the game and held off a 22-7 late-game Georgetown rally to upset the Hoyas 78–72. Thanks to the surprising loss, Georgetown opened its season with a 1–2 record for the second straight year.

Four days later, the Hoyas were in Hawaii at the Lahaina Civic Center in Lahaina, Maui, to open the bracketed championship round of the tournament with a quarterfinal match-up against their first ranked opponent of the year, No. 13 Oregon. The Ducks struggled against a strong Hoya defense and did not score a field goal for the first six minutes, shooting 7-for-29 (24.1 percent) from the field in the first half. Rodney Pryor, meanwhile, led Georgetown through Oregon's pressure defense during the half, and his buzzer-beating three-pointer gave the Hoyas a 38–21 halftime lead. In the second half, however, the Ducks′ pressure defense was far more effective, and it allowed them to force turnovers and make easy transition baskets. While Georgetown missed its first 12 shots of the second half, Oregon opened the half with a 22–4 scoring run that gave the Ducks a 43–42 lead. The Hoyas then staged a 10–2 scoring run of their own to pull out to a 52–45 lead with three minutes to play. Oregon responded with a late run and, with 3.8 seconds remaining, closed to a 63–61 deficit on a long three-pointer by junior forward Dillon Brooks, but L. J. Peak hit two free throws with 2.7 seconds to play to secure a 65–61 upset Georgetown victory. Pryor had a double-double with 26 points and 10 rebounds, and Peak finished with 17 points. The Hoyas evened their record at 2–2, but had begun to show a tendency toward inconsistent play during their first four games, sometimes playing dominating basketball and then struggling mightily during other stretches of their games.

The Hoyas advanced to the semifinals the next day to meet another ranked opponent, No. 16 Wisconsin, which had defeated Tennessee in the quarterfinals the previous day. The Hoyas never really found their shooting touch, but they held their own in the first half and Wisconsin clung to a 32–29 lead at halftime. During the second half, however, the Badgers opened with a scoring run that gave them a 44–34 lead, and by midway through the half led 53–39 on their way to a 73–57 victory. During the game, Wisconsin shot only 5-for-22 (22.7 percent) from three-point range, but rebounding proved to be the game's decisive factor: Wisconsin had a 19–1 advantage in offensive rebounds and scored 20 second-chance points, and overall the Badgers outrebounded the Hoyas 50-21 and outscored Georgetown 38–16 in the paint. The Hoyas′ poor performance on the boards prompted John Thompson III to observe during his post-game comments, "We have to get some guys that understand that it′s not just about points and minutes, and care about all aspects of the game." L. J. Peak led the Hoyas with 18 points and Rodney Pryor finished with 14. For the second straight season, the Hoyas opened with a 2–3 record.

The loss to Wisconsin relegated the Hoyas to the third-place game, in which they faced Oklahoma State the next day. Oklahoma State had beaten UConn in the quarterfinals, but then suffered a one-sided defeat at the hands of No. 4 North Carolina in the semifinals. The Cowboys began the game with a sluggish and lackluster effort that led Oklahoma State head coach Brad Underwood to call an early time out, slam down his clipboard, berate his team, and replace four starters with bench players. Underwood's admonishment and the lineup change sparked much greater energy among his players, who presented the Hoyas with a strong pressure defense the rest of the way. This time, turnovers were the decisive factor: The Hoyas fell victim to sloppy ball-handling, and Oklahoma State forced 14 turnovers – 11 of them steals – in the first half alone and led 50–35 at the half. For the game overall, Georgetown shot 51 percent from the field, but Oklahoma State scored 41 points off 28 turnovers, including 19 steals, and had a 59–16 advantage in points off the bench. Rodney Pryor scored 15 points and Bradley Hayes 13, and Akoy Agau scored in double figures for the first time as a Hoya, finishing with 11 points, but the Cowboys won 97–70. Georgetown finished in fourth place in the tournament and fell to 2–4 on the season. It was Georgetown's worst start since the 1971–1972 team opened 1–5 on its way to a 3–23 final record.

The Hoyas returned to the Verizon Center to sweep a three-game homestand, defeating Howard, Coppin State, and Elon; the Elon game, by far the closest of the three, was a part of the annual BB&T Classic, in which Georgetown made both its third consecutive appearance and third appearance overall and improved its all-time record in the Classic to 3–0. Rodney Pryor led the Hoyas in all three games; he scored 26 points against Howard and 30 points against Coppin State, tying his career high with seven three-pointers, and he finished with 23 points against Elon. L. J. Peak scored 14 points against Howard and had a career-high 10 assists against Coppin State – the first Georgetown player to have double-digit assists since Markel Starks had 11 on March 3, 2014. Peak followed that performance with a 22-point game against Elon. Akoy Agau scored 14 against Howard, a new high for him as a Hoya, and Tre Campbell finished with 12 points in the Howard game. Bradley Hayes had 10 points, seven rebounds, five assists, and three blocked shots against Coppin State, while Jessie Govan grabbed a career-best 11 rebounds in the Coppin State game and scored 13 points against Elon. Against Coppin State, the Hoyas shot 45.2 percent from three-point range, making a season-high 14 three-pointers on 31 attempts.

Six days after beating Elon, Georgetown traveled to Miami to meet La Salle – a team Georgetown had played only twice since 1965 – in the Hoophall Miami Invitational. The Hoyas broke a tie and ran away from the Explorers with a late run in the final 8:44 to win, improving their all-time record against La Salle to 10–15 and extending their winning streak to four, as L. J. Peak scored 24 points Rodney Pryor 19, Jesse Govan 18, and Jagan Moseley scored in double figures for the first time as a Hoya with 14 points, while Marcus Derrickson contributed nine points and eight rebounds.

On December 12, two days after the La Salle game, John Thompson III announced that Isaac Copeland had decided to transfer to Nebraska at the end of the semester. Copeland gave no reason for leaving Georgetown, but the arrival of Rodney Pryor and increased playing time for reserves Marcus Derrickson and Kaleb Johnson as well as his own declining performance and injuries had led to reduced playing time for him.

After another week off following the La Salle game, the Hoyas journeyed to the Carrier Dome to face Syracuse – their archrival throughout the 34-season history of the original Big East Conference of 1979–2013 – on a snowy day on which Syracuse honored former Orange great Dwayne "Pearl" Washington, who had died of cancer in April 2016. Syracuse jumped out to an 11–4 lead, its largest of the game, in the first 5:08, but Georgetown came back and L. J. Peak sank a basket to tie the game at 31–31 with two minutes left until the intermission, in part thanks to Peak's 12 first-half points. The game was tied 33–33 at halftime, but Georgetown pulled ahead to its largest lead of the game, 67–60, with only 2:36 left to play. The Orange closed to 69–66 with 1:04 left, but the Hoyas hit nine free throws in the final 38 seconds to come away with a 78–71 victory, their sixth over the Orange in the last eight meetings. Peak had a double-double with 23 points and 11 rebounds and Rodney Pryor scored 20 points. Georgetown, which entered the game averaging 28.5 trips to the free-throw line per game and shooting 77.5 percent in free throws, went 22-of-25 from the free-throw line, while Syracuse made only 14 of its 25 free throw attempts. The Hoyas improved their all-time record against Syracuse to 43–49, their all-time road record against Syracuse to 13–30, and their record against the Orange under John Thompson III to 11–7.

Georgetown closed out the nonconference portion of its season by returning to the Verizon Center to defeat UNC Greensboro in a game in which Jesse Govan went 9-for-13 (69.2 percent) from the field, including 2-for-2 in three-pointers, and had 20 points, nine rebounds, five assists, and four blocks, while L. J. Peak contributed 16 points, Marcus Derrickson scored 15 points, and Rodney Pryor added 12. The Hoyas had won five straight to enter the Big East season with a record of 8–4.

=== Conference schedule ===
The Hoyas opened the Big East season with a loss at Marquette, in which Rodney Pryor finished with 23 points, Jesse Govan scored 11, and Marcus Derrickson came off the bench for 11. They then came home to host their third ranked opponent of the year, No. 17 Xavier, at the Verizon Center on New Year's Eve 2016. Xavier was one of four Big East teams ranked in the Top 17 at the time. Peak scored 16 points in the first half, and the underdog Hoyas led 38–36 at halftime and pulled out to a six-point lead early in the second half. Xavier came back to tie the game at 54–54, but Peak completed a three-point play – scoring his last points of the game – to put Georgetown ahead 57–54 with 11:41 left to play. Xavier increasingly used a 1-3-1 zone defense as the second half progressed, and this gave the Musketeers greater defensive success against the Hoyas. Xavier took the lead for good at 62–59 with 8:23 remaining during a 13-5 scoring run that gave the Musketeers their largest lead of the game, 74–62, with 3:58 left to play. Rodney Pryor led a Georgetown comeback by scoring 10 points in a row, but his potential game-tying three-pointer missed with Xavier leading 77–74 and 24 seconds remaining. Although Georgetown held Xavier to 39 percent shooting from the field, and rendered Xavier's leading scorer, junior guard Trevon Bluiett, ineffective throughout the game, Musketeer redshirt sophomore guard Edmond Sumner, playing on his birthday, scored a career-high 28 points. From the free-throw line, Xavier went 29-for-38 (76.3 percent) with Sumner alone going 14-for-17 (82.4 percent), while Georgetown as a team shot 14-for-23 (60.9 percent) from the line. Georgetown shot 50 percent from the field, and Peak finished with a team-high 21 points, Pryor with 20, and Derrickson with 12, but Xavier held on to win, 81–76. Georgetown had its first 0–2 start in Big East play since the 2012–2013 season.

A visit to Providence four days later to play the first game of 2017 resulted in a third loss and Georgetown's first 0–3 start in conference play since the 1999–2000 season. Marcus Derrickson had a career-high 26 points, Rodney Pryor scored 16, and Akoy Agau had his first career double-double with 12 points and a career-best 12 rebounds, but Georgetown remained winless on the road against the Friars since February 18, 2012. The Hoyas then hosted their second ranked conference opponent of the season, No. 18 Butler, which three days earlier had upset No. 1 Villanova. Georgetown led 32–31 at halftime. With a minute left to play, the Hoyas held a 66–63 lead, but Butler sophomore center Nate Fowler's three-pointer tied the game at 66–66 with 58 seconds to play. Jagan Moseley hit two free throws with 38 seconds on the clock to give the Hoyas a 68–66 lead, but Fowler's two free throws with eight seconds left again tied the game at 68–68. Georgetown had a chance to avoid overtime and pull off an upset, but L. J. Peak's attempt at a buzzer-beating turnaround jumper as time expired in regulation bounced off the rim. Butler never trailed in overtime and took the lead for good with 3:04 to play on two free throws by redshirt senior guard Kethan Savage. The Bulldogs won, 85–76, their third consecutive victory over the Hoyas. The Hoyas outscored the Bulldogs 40–20 in the paint and Butler shot only 39.1 percent from the field, but the Bulldogs stayed in the game on 10-of-20 shooting from three-point range. Peak scored a team-high 21 points, Jagan Moseley contributed a career-best 20, Marcus Derrickson contributed 14 points, and Bradley Hayes narrowly missed a double-double with 10 points and nine rebounds, but Rodney Pryor, the Big East's scoring co-leader entering the game, averaging 19.8 points, went scoreless on 0-for-8 shooting against a spirited defensive effort by Butler freshman guard Kamar Baldwin, who also scored a career-high 16 points for the Bulldogs. Georgetown saw its record fall to 8–8 and opened its conference season 0–4 for the first time since the 1998–1999 season, and, along with DePaul, was one of two teams still winless in the Big East.

Two days after the loss to Butler, Georgetown's four-game homestand continued with its first conference win, a runaway victory over St. John's – the Hoyas′ twelfth straight home win over the Red Storm – with L. J. Peak scoring 16 points that included a 10-for-10 free-throw shooting performance, Rodney Pryor and Jagan Moseley each scoring 13 points, and Marcus Derrickson adding 11. A break from conference action followed, as UConn visited the Verizon Center to conclude a home-and-home series begun the previous season. The Hoyas and Huskies were charter members of the original Big East Conference in 1979 and had met each season throughout that conference's 34-year history, but the rivalry had lapsed when Georgetown left the conference in the summer of 2013 to join the new Big East Conference while UConn remained behind in the old conference, renamed the American Athletic Conference and marketed as "the American;" the two-season home-and-home series revived play between the teams after a two-season absence. UConn had won the previous year, but this time the Hoyas overcame a 14-point second-half deficit to beat the Huskies and improve their all-time record against UConn to 36–30. L. J. Peak scored 21 points, 16 of them in the second half, Jesse Govan came off the bench to finish with 15, and Rodney Pryor had 14. Georgetown's two-game winning streak and four-game homestand both came to an end two days later, when Providence visited Georgetown and won easily to sweep the regular-season series between the teams and stretch its winning streak against the Hoyas to six. Peak scored 13 points and Pryor 12, but the Hoyas as a team shot only 18-for-55 (32.7 percent) from the field and only 5-for-23 (21.7 percent) from three-point range against the Friars.

With a conference record of 1–5 and an overall record of 10–9, Georgetown began a stretch of three straight games in seven days against ranked conference opponents. First they visited No. 22 Xavier. The Musketeers entered the game having lost three games in a row, all against ranked Big East teams, their longest losing streak in three years. Xavier clung to a 34–33 lead at halftime, but pulled out to a 12-point advantage in the second half. The Hoyas came back to tie the game at 58–58, but Xavier then went on a decisive 12–3 scoring run to take a 70–61 lead. Rodney Pryor scored 23 points and L. J. Peak finished with 12, but fouling and rebounding undid the Hoyas; the Musketeers repeatedly drew fouls by driving the basket and went 36-for-49 from the free-throw line, while the Hoyas made 11 out of 14 free throws. Xavier won 86–75, handing Georgetown its sixth loss in seven games and dropping the Hoyas to 10–10 on the season and 1–6 in the Big East. In play against ranked teams, Georgetown had lost four straight games and nine of its last ten.

Georgetown next returned to the Verizon Center to host No. 16 Creighton. The Bluejays were the second-best shooting team in NCAA Division I at 52.8 percent from the field, and tenth in three-point shooting at 40.8 percent, but had suffered a major loss when a season-ending knee injury sidelined their point guard, senior Maurice Watson Jr., nine days earlier during a game against Xavier. Jonathan Mulmore made his first start as a Hoya. Rodney Pryor had an outstanding first half in which he dunked several times, sank two of his three three-pointers, and scored 15 points. Thanks in part to a 13–2 scoring run, Georgetown led 39–27 at the half. The Hoyas extended their lead to as many as 22 points in the second half and never led by fewer than 14 points during the last 15:32 of the game. Georgetown cruised to a 71–51 upset victory. Creighton shot only 34.5 percent from the field and only 1-for-18 (5.6 percent) from three-point range, and it was the Bluejays′ lowest-scoring game of the season. Georgetown outrebounded Creighton 47–36. L. J. Peak scored 20 points, Pryor finished with 18, and Jesse Govan added 15. The win was Georgetown's first conference victory over any team other than DePaul and St. John's – perennially the two teams at the bottom of the conference's standings – since a win over Creighton on January 26, 2016, and it improved Georgetown's conference record to 2–6, allowing the Hoyas to avoid their first 1–7 conference start since the 1998–1999 season.

The Hoyas traveled to Indianapolis to face No. 11 Butler in their next game. Butler – winner of four straight games overall and 14 straight at home, including 11–0 thus far in the 2016–2017 season – led 41–40 at halftime. During one stretch in the second half, Rodney Pryor, despite playing with four fouls, scored 11 straight points, nine of them on three straight contested three-pointers, giving Georgetown a 72–65 lead. The Bulldogs then closed the gap, scoring seven straight points to tie the game at 72–72. The Hoyas led 79–77 with 1:03 to play when Jesse Govan hit a long, unexpected three-pointer – only the third three-pointer he had ever made in Big East play – to give Georgetown an 82–77 lead. The Bulldogs never had another chance to tie or take the lead, and Georgetown won 85–81. During the three-year tenure of Butler head coach Chris Holtmann, the Bulldogs had won all 30 previous games in which they had scored 80 or more points. The Hoyas shot 63.8 percent from the field for the game and 72.7 percent in the second half. L. J. Peak scored 22 points and Pryor 20, while Govan went 8-for-9 from the field overall and 3-for-3 in three-pointers and tied his season high by finishing with 20 points.

The back-to-back wins over Creighton and Butler gave the Hoyas a 3–3 record against ranked teams for the season and, with a weaker part of their schedule coming up, raised hopes that the team could turn its season around after a difficult start over the first three months. The Hoyas concluded January by winning their third game in a row, defeating DePaul in a close one at the Verizon Center thanks largely to L. J. Peak scoring five points in the final minute and Jesse Govan blocking a shot with 40 seconds to play. Rodney Pryor scored a game-high 26 points, Govan finished with 14, and Peak contributed 13. The victory was Georgetown's 20th over DePaul in the last 21 meetings between the teams and improved Georgetown's record to 13–10 overall, 4–6 in the Big East, but the Hoyas were destined to win only one more game all season.

The team's February collapse began with an overtime loss to Seton Hall at the Verizon Center on February 4 in which L. J. Peak scored 18 points, Rodney Pryor had 13, and Marcus Derrickson finished with nine points and eight rebounds. On February 6, as the Hoyas headed north through Howard County, Maryland, on Interstate 95 on their way to Pennsylvania to play No. 2 Villanova, their team bus struck the rear of a sport-utility vehicle, causing the SUV to veer off the highway and overturn. The team and its staff got off the bus to assist the two occupants of the SUV, who were taken to a hospital, then boarded another bus to finish their journey. No one aboard the bus requested medical attention, but when the Hoyas met Villanova at The Pavilion the following afternoon, Tre Campbell sat out with a banged knee and John Thompson III was observed hobbling along the sideline in apparent pain. The Wildcats missed six of their first seven three-point attempts, but then Villanova senior guard Josh Hart sparked an offensive surge by hitting three three-pointers and scoring 17 first-half points; Villanova took a 17-point first-half lead and still led 43–28 at halftime. In the second half, Hart fell silent on offense and the Hoyas made a comeback bid, mounting a 17–4 scoring run that cut a Wildcat 17-point lead to 60–58 with 3:49 left to play. With Georgetown threatening an upset, Hart regained his form on offense, hitting two clutch shots, a three-pointer and a layup, to give the Wildcats a 70–61 lead. Hart finished with a game-high 25 points and Villanova won 75–64 for its 48th straight victory at The Pavilion. Peak scored 21 points and Pryor had 20 points and nine rebounds, but the back-to-back losses dropped Georgetown to 13–12 overall and 4–8 in the Big East.

After a safer and much less eventful return trip to Washington, the Hoyas beat Marquette at the Verizon Center. Georgetown shot 53.7 percent from the field as a team, and no fewer than three Hoyas scored 20 points or more: Jesse Govan, Rodney Pryor, and L. J. Peak combined for 23-of-42 (54.7 percent) shooting, and Govan had a game-high 23 points along with eight rebounds, Pryor finished with a double-double (20 points and 10 rebounds), and Peak scored 20 points, including the 1,000th point of his collegiate career. Third in the United States in three-point shooting at 42.4 percent, the Golden Eagles managed only 3-of-14 (21.4 percent) from beyond the arc against Georgetown. It was Georgetown's last win of the season and the 278th and final win of John Thompson III's 13-year tenure as Georgetown's head coach.

After an eight-day break in action, Georgetown went back on the road for its eighth game of the season against a ranked opponent, facing No. 20 Creighton. Led by redshirt junior guard Marcus Foster – who sank four three-pointers and scored a game-high 35 points – the Bluejays shot 53 percent from the field compared to only 38.5 percent for the Hoyas, who managed only a 3-for-22 (13.6 percent) performance from three-point range. Creighton led 41–33 at halftime and went on a 19–6 scoring run in the second half to take a 60–44 lead. The Hoyas appeared to be mounting a comeback, closing to 66–55, when their shooting went cold and they went scoreless for the next 4 1/2 minutes as Creighton cruised to an 87–70 win. L. J. Peak scored a team-high 23 points, Rodney Pryor finished with 16, and Jesse Govan had 12, while Akoy Agau had nine points, nine rebounds, and three blocked shots, but also five turnovers. The Hoyas entered the game as one of the Big East's best defensive teams, but the 87 points the Bluejays scored were the second-most Georgetown had given up all season, and Creighton posted the third-highest shooting percentage of any team that had faced the Hoyas during the season.

Three more losses followed in a game at the Verizon Center against DePaul and road games against St. John's and Seton Hall. The DePaul game broke a 10-game losing streak for the Blue Demons and a six-game Georgetown winning streak against DePaul, and it was only the second time in the last 22 meetings between the schools that DePaul had beaten Georgetown. Rodney Pryor scored 14 points against DePaul, had 22 points including five three-pointers against St. John's, and finished with 11 against Seton Hall. In the DePaul game, Jesse Govan had 18 points and Marcus Derrickson had 11. L. J. Peak scored 20 points against St. John's and 15 against Seton Hall. Against St. John's, Jesse Govan scored 13 and Kaleb Johnson added 11.

The Hoyas closed out the regular season by hosting No. 2 Villanova at the Verizon Center. Villanova led 38–28 at halftime, but Georgetown cut the Wildcats′ lead to four points, 39–35, with 16:42 remaining in the game. Villanova was shooting only 34.8 percent from the field, on pace for a season low, and holding a 46–39 lead with 11:50 remaining in the game when the Wildcat shooters began to find the range. With a little over seven minutes remaining, Wildcat senior guard Josh Hart hit two consecutive three-pointers to give Villanova a decisive 60–45 lead, and the game degenerated into a rout from there, as Villanova scored on 15 of 17 possessions and made 12 of its final 16 shots – improving its shooting percentage from the field to 46.3 percent for the game – on the way to an 81–55 win. Rodney Pryor led Georgetown with 21 points; he was the only Georgetown player to score in double figures, and the Hoyas committed 20 turnovers. It was Villanova's fifth straight win against Georgetown, the longest winning streak ever in the rivalry between the schools.

Georgetown's regular season ended with a five-game losing streak and losses in seven of its final eight games, and the Hoyas posted a regular-season record of 14–17 overall and 5–13 in the Big East, good for a ninth-place conference finish. It was the team's worst conference record since a 4–12 finish in the original Big East in the 2003–2004 season, and its worst conference finish since it finished in 11th place in the original Big East in 2008–2009. In reporting the results of the final game against Villanova, the Associated Press referred to "the disaster of Thompson′s 13th season on the Hilltop [i.e., at Georgetown]," and when a reporter tried to ask John Thompson III questions about the future of the Georgetown men's basketball program as it faced a likely second consecutive losing season, a team spokesman interrupted, saying "Leave it to game-related questions, please."

=== Big East tournament ===
With a No. 9 seed in the 2017 Big East tournament at Madison Square Garden, Georgetown faced eighth-seeded St. John's in the first round. Both schools were charter members of the original Big East Conference when it was created in 1979, and it was their seventh meeting in the tournament since it began in 1980. Former Georgetown head coach John Thompson Jr., and former Georgetown great Allen Iverson, both members of the Naismith Memorial Basketball Hall of Fame, attended the game. In the original Big East's heyday in the mid-1980s, when St. John's head coach Chris Mullin had played for the Red Storm and John Thompson III's father, John Thompson Jr., had coached the Hoyas, the two schools had been national powers and great rivals, and both teams entered the game aware of this history. St. John's made only five of its first 21 shots from the field, but led 38–34 at halftime, and also led for most of the second half. With 8:35 left to play and St. John's ahead 59–55, the game briefly took on the character of the very physical games of the original Big East in the 1980s when Red Storm junior forward Amar Alibegović fouled L. J. Peak hard under the basket and a shoving match ensued between several players, resulting in the officials calling a flagrant foul against Alibegović and technical fouls against both Chris Mullin and Georgetown assistant coach Patrick Ewing Jr., a former Georgetown player whose father, Patrick Ewing, had played against Mullin as Georgetown's center at the peak of the 1980s rivalry between the teams. After the scuffle, Peak made one free throw to cut the Red Storm's lead to 59–56. After that, the Hoyas got within one point of St. John's three times but could never take the lead. The Red Storm led 74–68 with three minutes to play, but did not score again. In Georgetown's final possession, which began with 6.6 seconds remaining and St. John's clinging to a 74–73 lead, both Peak and Marcus Derrickson missed close-in shots, allowing St. John's to hang on for a 74–73 win. Georgetown's season came to an end, while St. John's snapped a six-year losing streak in the Big East tournament and moved on to face Villanova in the quarterfinals the following day. The Red Storm finished shooting 37.7 percent from the field overall, including 5-for-20 (25 percent) from three-point range, while the Hoyas shot 45.8 percent from the field overall and made five of their 21 three-point shots (23.8 percent). Playing in their last game for Georgetown, Peak scored a game-high 24 points, 22 of them in the second half, and Rodney Pryor contributed 17. Derrickson scored 11 points.

With a record of 14–18 and having lost their last six games and eight of their last nine, Georgetown received no invitation to either the NCAA tournament or the National Invitation Tournament for the second straight year. It was the first time Georgetown had two consecutive losing seasons since 1971–1972 and 1972–1973, and the first time the Hoyas had received an invitation to neither the NCAA Tournament or the NIT in two consecutive seasons since 1973 and 1974. For the second straight season, the Hoyas never made the Top 25 in either the Associated Press Poll or the Coaches Poll – the first time that had happened in consecutive seasons since 2002-2003 and 2003-2004.

=== John Thompson III fired ===
The failure of the 2016–2017 team, coming on the heels of a similar failure the previous season, left the Georgetown basketball program in turmoil. In his 13 years at Georgetown, John Thompson III had an overall record of 278–151, with 11 winning seasons, eight appearances in the NCAA Tournament and three in the NIT. Since the notorious loss to 15th-seeded Florida Gulf Coast in the 2013 NCAA tournament, however, Georgetown had endured the worst four-year stretch of his tenure as head coach. Those four years coincided with the first four seasons of the new Big East Conference; it consisted of a group of schools brought in from mid-major conferences combined with some of the less-competitive teams from the original Big East, and the Hoyas and their fans had expected the team to dominate the new conference as its flagship program. Instead, over those four years the Hoyas had posted an overall record of 69–62, and their 32–40 Big East record was third-worst in the conference; the Hoyas had no regular-season or conference-tournament championships in the new Big East, had missed the NCAA Tournament in three of the new conference's four seasons, had lost in the second game of their lone NCAA appearance – as well as in the second game of their only NIT appearance – and had finished with two consecutive losing seasons in which they had no postseason play whatsoever. For the second year in a row, the team had an up-and-down early season and collapsed in February; the 2016–2017 season ended with six consecutive losses, including to DePaul and St. John's – both long the cellar-dwellers of the Big East – and the team's 14–18 record was the worst for Georgetown since the 1971-1972 team's dismal 3–23 finish. Although Thompson emphasized defense, the Hoyas′ defense had been mediocre over its four years in the new Big East, never ranking higher than 110th among the 351 NCAA Division I teams in defensive efficiency, and the 2016–2017 squad's defense statistics were poor: 116th in the defensive efficiency and 302nd in fouls committed, while allowing opponents 10 offensive rebounds per game. On offense, the Hoyas had gone five seasons without ever ranking in the top 50 teams in offensive efficiency, and in three seasons had ranked worse than 100th.

By late February, signs began to appear in the student section at the Verizon Center and on the road at Madison Square Garden reading "Fire Thompson" and "Degioia Do Your Job" – a plea for Georgetown University President John J. DeGioia to fire Thompson – and cheers of "Fire Thompson!" became common from the stands. In early March, Georgetown students launched a petition demanding that the university fire Thompson; it garnered 1,700 signatures by mid-March. Adding fuel to the fire, Thompson's attempt to address Georgetown's lack of a true point guard since the graduation of Markel Starks in 2014 by recruiting Tremont Waters, an elite point guard prospect, for the following season failed when Waters requested his release from Georgetown on March 11, highlighting to the fan base how much of its star power the Georgetown program had lost since its 2007 Final Four appearance. More negative publicity arose when school financial disclosures revealed that Thompson had received annual pay increases from 2008 to through 2014, resulting in a salary of $3.6 million a year that likely made him one of the ten most highly compensated college basketball coaches in the United States. Amid a rising chorus of criticism by Georgetown students and alumni of Thompson's performance, and press articles by students and ESPN describing dissatisfaction among Georgetown students and alumni with the direction of the men's basketball program, Georgetown University announced on March 23 that it had fired Thompson, bringing his 13-year tenure as head coach to an end.

When Thompson arrived at Georgetown to take charge of the program in 2004, he inherited a team that had finished with a losing record the previous season. Also inheriting his predecessor Craig Esherick′s last recruiting class, which included point guard Jonathan Wallace and two future NBA players, forward Jeff Green and center Roy Hibbert, and himself recruiting DaJuan Summers, he had led the Hoyas back to the NCAA Tournament, reaching the Sweet Sixteen in 2006 and the Final Four in 2007 in his third season with the Hoyas. Over the next eight seasons, Georgetown made six NCAA Tournament appearances, but won only three NCAA tournament games, never advancing beyond the Round of 32 and losing in each case to lower-seeded teams, all but one of them double-digit seeds. The loss in 2008, to 10th-seeded Davidson, was shocking at the time but in retrospect was understandable, given that Davidson was led by future NBA great Stephen Curry. However, it was the harbinger of what turned out to be a gradual, decade-long slide into mediocrity. The later losses – to 14th-seeded Ohio in 2010, to 11th-seeded VCU in 2011, to 11th-seeded North Carolina State in 2012, and above all to 15th-seeded Florida Gulf Coast in 2013, as well as to fifth-seeded Utah in 2015 – had no such straightforward explanation.

While the team that centered around the 2011 recruiting class's Greg Whittington and Otto Porter Jr. showed signs of potential greatness, it never reached the heights of the 2006–2007 Final Four team, and after Porter departed for the NBA in 2013 after his sophomore season, Thompson's recruiting efforts paid fewer and fewer dividends. Thompson remained committed to his "Princeton offense" despite its growing obsolescence in the face of the evolution of the college game, and his adherence to it harmed his recruiting efforts, as potential recruits sought opportunities elsewhere under systems that better fit their playing style and showcased the athletic abilities that NBA scouts favored. Washington, D.C., and its suburbs remained a hotbed of high-school basketball talent, but Thompson had markedly less success in recruiting Washington-area players than his predecessors John Thompson Jr. and Craig Esherick; observers noted that Villanova had built the dominant team and perennial winner in the new Big East Conference – a team that made deep runs annually in the NCAA Tournament and won the national championship in 2016 – at least partially by recruiting two star players from Washington's Maryland suburbs, guards Josh Hart from Silver Spring and Kris Jenkins from Upper Marlboro; both had grown up as Hoya fans, but Thompson lost out to Villanova head coach Jay Wright in recruiting Hart and never pursued Jenkins. Under Thompson, the program had a high number of players transfer to other schools, finding that under Thompson they had too little playing time and few opportunities to showcase their athleticism.

The dismissal of both Greg Whittington and Joshua Smith from the 2013–14 team could explain that team's failure, but so could Thompson's increasing inability to recruit players who fit into his system and would develop successfully at the college level. The 2014 recruiting class – which included Tre Campbell, Trey Mourning, L. J. Peak, and Paul White – despite some success in its first season, also was notable for its lack of development on the court. Only Peak showed progress as a junior, and only Mourning remained at Georgetown for a full four years of collegiate eligibility. The glory years of Georgetown's men's basketball program had become too distant to resonate with potential recruits, and without NBA-caliber talent after Porter's departure, the once-proud Georgetown program had gone from a perennial national power to consistently mediocre performances that culminated in two straight losing seasons and declining fan interest and attendance at home games; for two straight years, Georgetown had struggled to fill even half the seats for its home games at the Verizon Center.

=== Patrick Ewing hired ===
Rather than fire Thompson soon after the Hoyas′ season ended, Georgetown waited until two weeks later to announce his termination, by which time some top options for the head coaching position already had accepted offers elsewhere. Georgetown athletic director Lee Reed and Paul Tagliabue, a former Georgetown player and one-time commissioner of the National Football League, led the effort to find a new head coach, but observers came to the conclusion that the university had no plan in place for who it wanted to succeed Thompson before it fired him, making the school's search for a successor appear bumbling. Notre Dame's Mike Brey, Xavier's Chris Mack, and Texas's Shaka Smart all rebuffed Georgetown's inquiries, and Harvard′s Tommy Amaker privately expressed disinterest in the job because of his concerns over internal politics at Georgetown, fearing that the influence that John Thompson III's father, John Thompson Jr., still wielded over the program despite having resigned as head coach in January 1999 could lead to a negative political environment for any new head coach. Georgetown informed recently fired Indiana head coach Tom Crean that he was not a candidate, but the names of Providence's Ed Cooley – who made clear that he had no desire to leave Providence – Rhode Island's Danny Hurley, Minnesota's Richard Pitino, Duke assistant coach Jeff Capel, USC's Andy Enfield, South Carolina's Frank Martin, and Charlotte Hornets assistant coach and Georgetown alumnus Patrick Ewing all were mentioned in the swirl of media speculation that followed Thompson's firing.

On April 3, 2017, Georgetown announced that it had hired Patrick Ewing as its next head basketball coach. Generally regarded as the greatest player in Georgetown history, Ewing had been Georgetown's star center from 1981 to 1985, leading the Hoyas to three appearances in the NCAA Tournament championship game and the 1984 national championship, then going on to a Naismith Basketball Hall of Fame NBA career as a player from 1985 to 2002 and as an assistant coach from 2002 to 2017. It was Ewing's first head coaching job at any level of basketball, and it marked his first foray into college basketball since his graduation from Georgetown in 1985.

=== Wrap-up ===
Rodney Pryor completed his only season as a Hoya as the team's leading scorer for the year; he started all 32 games, shooting 48.0 percent from the field overall and 41.2 percent in three-pointers, averaging a team-high 18.0 points and leading the team with 5.0 rebounds per game. L. J. Peak also started all 32 games, and he averaged 16.3 points and 3.8 rebounds per game, shooting 48.1 percent from the field overall and 32.7 percent from three-point range. Jesse Govan played in every game, starting 21 of them, shooting 53.0 percent in field-goal attempts and 40.0 percent from three-point range, and he averaged 10.1 points and 5.0 rebounds per game. Marcus Derrickson played in 28 games and started 17 of them, averaging 8.3 points per game on 43.2 percent field-goal shooting overall and 34.4 percent from three-point range, and he had 4.4 rebounds per game. In his only season in action with the Hoyas, Akoy Agau appeared in all 32 games and started eight of them; he ended the season with a field-goal percentage of 50.6 and with per-game averages of 4.5 points and 4.3 rebounds. Bradley Hayes appeared in 25 games, starting 11 of them, and he finished with 4.2 points and 4.0 rebounds per game, shooting 53.4 percent from the field. Jagan Moseley started 20 of the 31 games he played in, and he averaged 4.2 points per game on 45.0 percent shooting from the field – 24.3 percent from beyond the arc – and grabbed 2.2 rebounds per game. Playing in all 32 games, Jonathan Mulmore had 12 starts and averaged 3.6 points and 1.4 rebounds per game, shooting 35.7 percent overall and 34.5 percent in three-pointers. Tre Campbell averaged 3.5 points and 1.2 rebounds in the 20 games he played in, all off the bench, and shot 38.7 percent from the field overall and 34.3 percent from three-point range, while Kaleb Johnson started twice in his 30 appearances, shooting 44.2 percent from the field overall and 25.0 percent in three-pointers, averaging 2.3 points per game and pulling down an average of 1.3 rebounds per game. Reggie Cameron played in 17 games, all off the bench, averaging 1.7 points and 0.9 rebound, and Trey Mourning played in only 10 games, all as a reserve, averaging 0.8 point per game. Before his mid-season transfer, Isaac Copeland played in seven games, started five, and averaged 5.5 points and 3.3 rebounds per game, shooting 27.5 percent from the field. Walk-ons Ra'Mond Hines and George Muresan each played in five games.

Rodney Pryor, Bradley Hayes, and Reggie Cameron all graduated in 2017. In addition to his lone year at Georgetown, Pryor played for Robert Morris in 2014–2015 and 2015–2016, and in his three-season college career he appeared in 96 games, starting 84, shooting 46.5 percent overall from the field and 38.1 percent from three-point range and averaging 17.1 points and 5.8 rebounds per game. Hayes played parts of five seasons for Georgetown; an afterthought for the first three, he had his breakout game against Eastern Washington in the 2015 NCAA tournament, and he made his greatest contributions to the team over the next two seasons. He finished his career having played in 94 games, starting 38 of them, shooting 53.4 percent from the field and averaging 4.0 points and 3.4 rebounds per game. Cameron appeared in 104 games in his four years at Georgetown, starting 18 of them, and finished his college career with a 37.4 shooting percentage from the field overall and 32.6 percent from three-point range, averaging 3.4 points and 1.3 rebounds per game.

A number of other players also left the team after the season. L. J. Peak announced on March 21 – two days before the university fired Thompson – that he had decided to forego his senior year of college and enter the 2017 NBA draft; Peak completed his three-season college career with 98 games played, including 76 starts, averaging 12.1 points and 3.1 rebounds per game and shooting 46.1 percent from the field, 33.5 percent from three-point range. He went undrafted, but played professionally outside the NBA. Isaac Copeland, who had transferred to Nebraska in mid-season, received word that the NCAA had granted him a medical hardship waiver that would permit him to begin play for the Cornhuskers at the beginning of the 2017–2018 season after sitting out only one semester. In his 2 1/2 seasons as a Hoya, Copeland had appeared in 73 games and started 49, shooting 50.0 percent from the field and 29.1 percent from beyond the arc, averaging 8.6 points and 4.5 rebounds per game. Akoy Agau, after finishing his only season of action with the Hoyas, announced on May 27 that he would transfer to SMU, where, as a graduate transfer, he would be eligible to begin play immediately in the 2017–2018 season. In early August 2017, Georgetown announced that Tre Campbell, amid rumors that he would miss the 2017–2018 season due to injuries he sustained in the February 2017 bus accident and other injuries he suffered during the 2017 offseason, would remain on scholarship but had been released from the basketball program for personal reasons. He completed his three seasons on the team having played in 84 games, starting 21 of them, averaging 3.7 points per game on 34.7 percent shooting from the field overall and 31.7 percent in three-pointers, and he grabbed 1.4 rebounds per game. Campbell remained at school at Georgetown, sitting out the 2017-2018 basketball season and graduating in 2018, and with a year of college eligibility remaining after his graduation, announced on May 8, 2018, that he would transfer to South Carolina where, as a graduate transfer, he would be eligible to begin play immediately in the 2018–2019 season. Rumors arose in mid-March that junior Trey Mourning, after limited playing time in three seasons as a Hoya and spending the last two games of the season on the sideline wearing a suit, would transfer from Georgetown, although in June the news broke that Mourning would return to Georgetown for his senior year after all.

At the end of the season, and with a new coach, the Hoyas faced an uncertain future. The failure of most of John Thompson III's recent recruiting efforts and the loss of the team's top scorers left Georgetown with what Sports Illustrated writer Pete Thamel described as a "program [that] is already buzz-less, lacking an on-court identity," and with "a roster so devoid of talent it would make 1980s Hoyas weep." Ewing was untested as a head coach and lacked familiarity with modern college basketball, and his hiring was viewed as a great gamble that had a high potential payoff if he quickly learned how to navigate the complexities of college recruiting and player development. As one of his first steps, Ewing attempted to re-recruit Tremont Waters, but Waters ultimately spurned his efforts, and in June he committed to LSU instead. Georgetown's program was in decline, and Waters's decision demonstrated how little attraction it held for nationally prominent recruits, The Hoyas were relying on Ewing to lay a foundation for it to return to national greatness.

== Roster ==
2016–17 Georgetown Hoyas men's basketball team
Players
Coaches

Pos.	#	Name	Height	Weight	Year	Previous school	Hometown
F	0	L. J. Peak	6 ft 5 in (1.96 m)	215 lb (98 kg)	Jr	Gaffney High School	Gaffney, South Carolina
G	1	Tre Campbell	6 ft 2 in (1.88 m)	170 lb (77 kg)	Jr	St. John's College High School	Washington, D.C.
G	2	Jonathan Mulmore	6 ft 4 in (1.93 m)	185 lb (84 kg)	Jr	Redemption Christian Academy/Allegany College	New Orleans, Louisiana
G	4	Jagan Mosely	6 ft 3 in (1.91 m)	205 lb (93 kg)	Fr	St. Anthony's	Morganville, New Jersey
F	5	Reggie Cameron II	6 ft 7 in (2.01 m)	225 lb (102 kg)	Sr	Hudson Catholic	Hackensack, New Jersey
G	10	Ra'Mond Hines (W)	6 ft 4 in (1.93 m)	175 lb (79 kg)	Jr	Gonzaga College High School	Washington, D.C.
F	11	Isaac Copeland	6 ft 9 in (2.06 m)	220 lb (100 kg)	Jr	Brewster Academy	Raleigh, North Carolina
C	15	Jessie Govan	6 ft 10 in (2.08 m)	270 lb (122 kg)	So	Wings Academy	Queens Village, New York
F	20	George Muresan (W)	6 ft 9 in (2.06 m)	210 lb (95 kg)	Fr	St. Andrew's	Potomac, Maryland
F	22	Akoy Agau	6 ft 8 in (2.03 m)	235 lb (107 kg)	RS Jr	Omaha Central High School	Omaha, Nebraska
G	23	Rodney Pryor	6 ft 5 in (1.96 m)	205 lb (93 kg)	RS Sr	Notre Dame/Robert Morris	Evanston, Illinois
F	24	Marcus Derrickson	6 ft 7 in (2.01 m)	250 lb (113 kg)	So	Brewster Academy	Bowie, Maryland
F	32	Kaleb Johnson	6 ft 6 in (1.98 m)	205 lb (93 kg)	So	Carlisle School	South Hill, Virginia
F	33	Trey Mourning	6 ft 9 in (2.06 m)	230 lb (104 kg)	Jr	Ransom Everglades School	Miami, Florida
C	42	Bradley Hayes	7 ft 0 in (2.13 m)	275 lb (125 kg)	RS Sr	Sandalwood High School	Jacksonville, Florida

Head coach

- John Thompson III (Princeton)

Assistant coach(es)

- Kevin Broadus (Bowie State)
- Anthony Solomon (Virginia)
- Akbar Waheed (Niagara)

Legend

- (C) Team captain
- (S) Suspended
- (I) Ineligible
- (W) Walk-on
- Injured
- Current redshirt

Roster

== Schedule ==
Date time, TV	Rank^{#}	Opponent^{#}	Result	Record	Site (attendance) city, state
Regular season
Nov 12, 2016*; 12:00 noon, FS2/MASN2		USC Upstate	W 105–60	1–0	Verizon Center (8,076); Washington, D.C.
Nov 15, 2016*; 6:30 pm, FS1		Maryland; Gavitt Tipoff Games	L 75–76	1–1	Verizon Center (13,145); Washington, D.C.
Nov 17, 2016*; 6:30 pm, FS1		Arkansas State; Maui Invitational opening round	L 72–78	1–2	McDonough Gymnasium (2,136); Washington, D.C.
Nov 21, 2016*; 5:00 pm, ESPN2		vs. No. 13 Oregon; Maui Invitational quarterfinal	W 65–61	2–2	Lahaina Civic Center (2,400); Lahaina, Maui, HI
Nov 22, 2016*; 8:15 pm, ESPN2		vs. No. 16 Wisconsin; Maui Invitational semifinal	L 57–73	2–3	Lahaina Civic Center (2,400); Lahaina, Maui, HI
Nov 23, 2016*; 7:30 pm, ESPN2		vs. Oklahoma State; Maui Invitational third place game	L 70–97	2–4	Lahaina Civic Center (2,400); Lahaina, Maui, HI
Nov 27, 2016*; 1:30 pm, FS1		Howard	W 85–72	3–4	Verizon Center (5,258); Washington, D.C.
Nov 30, 2016*; 6:30 pm, FSN/MASN2		Coppin State	W 96–44	4–4	Verizon Center (3,996); Washington, D.C.
Dec 4, 2016*; 1:30 pm, FS1		Elon; BB&T Classic	W 77–74	5–4	Verizon Center (8,645); Washington, D.C.
Dec 10, 2016*; 2:10 pm, ESPN2		vs. La Salle; HoopHall Miami Invitational	W 93–78	6–4	American Airlines Arena (2,152); Miami, FL
Dec 17, 2016*; 12:00 noon, ESPN		at Syracuse; Rivalry	W 78–71	7–4	Carrier Dome (25,131); Syracuse, NY
Dec 22, 2016*; 6:30 pm, FS1		UNC Greensboro	W 78–56	8–4	Verizon Center (8,096); Washington, D.C.
Dec 28, 2016; 8:45 pm, FS1		at Marquette	L 66–76	8–5 (0–1)	BMO Harris Bradley Center (14,886); Milwaukee, WI
Dec 31, 2016; 11:00 am, FS1		No. 17 Xavier	L 76–81	8–6 (0–2)	Verizon Center (11,275); Washington, D.C.
Jan 4, 2017; 7:00 pm, CBSSN		at Providence	L 70–76	8–7 (0–3)	Dunkin' Donuts Center (9,586); Providence, RI
Jan 7, 2017; 12:10 pm, FOX		No. 18 Butler	L 76–85 ^{OT}	8–8 (0–4)	Verizon Center (8,273); Washington, D.C.
Jan 9, 2017; 6:30 pm, FS1		St. John's	W 83–55	9–8 (1–4)	Verizon Center (5,158); Washington, D.C.
Jan 14, 2017*; 12:10 pm, FOX		Connecticut; Rivalry	W 72–69	10–8	Verizon Center (12,164); Washington, D.C.
Jan 16, 2017; 9:00 pm, FS1		Providence; MLK Day Marathon	L 56–74	10–9 (1–5)	Verizon Center (5,169); Washington, D.C.
Jan 22, 2017; 2:00 pm, CBS		at No. 22 Xavier	L 75–86	10–10 (1–6)	Cintas Center (10,343); Cincinnati, OH
Jan 25, 2017; 7:00 pm, FSN/MASN2		No. 16 Creighton	W 71–51	11–10 (2–6)	Verizon Center (8,185); Washington, D.C.
Jan 28, 2017; 8:10 pm, CBSSN		at No. 11 Butler	W 85–81	12–10 (3–6)	Hinkle Fieldhouse (9,116); Indianapolis, IN
Jan 31, 2017; 9:15 pm, FS1		at DePaul	W 76–73	13–10 (4–6)	Allstate Arena (5,455); Rosemont, IL
Feb 4, 2017; 12:00 noon, FS1		Seton Hall	L 66–68 ^{OT}	13–11 (4–7)	Verizon Center (10,142); Washington, D.C.
Feb 7, 2017; 7:00 pm, FS1		at No. 2 Villanova	L 64–75	13–12 (4–8)	The Pavilion (6,500); Villanova, PA
Feb 11, 2017; 12:07 pm, FOX		Marquette	W 80–62	14–12 (5–8)	Verizon Center (11,386); Washington, D.C.
Feb 19, 2017; 3:35 pm, FS1		at No. 20 Creighton	L 70–87	14–13 (5–9)	CenturyLink Center (17,626); Omaha, NE
Feb 22, 2017; 7:05 pm, CBSSN		DePaul	L 65–67	14–14 (5–10)	Verizon Center (7,896); Washington, D.C.
Feb 25, 2017; 12:00 noon, FSN/MASN2		at St. John's	L 80–86	14–15 (5–11)	Madison Square Garden (11,277); New York, NY
Feb 28, 2017; 6:30 pm, FS1		at Seton Hall	L 59–62	14–16 (5–12)	Prudential Center (8,500); Newark, NJ
Mar 4, 2017; 12:08 pm, FOX		No. 2 Villanova	L 55–81	14–17 (5–13)	Verizon Center (15,143); Washington, D.C.
Big East tournament
Mar 8, 2017; 7:00 pm, FS1	(9)	vs. (8) St. John′s; First round	L 73–74	14–18	Madison Square Garden (14,803); New York, NY
*Non-conference game. ^{#}Rankings from AP Poll. (#) Tournament seedings in parentheses. All times are in Eastern Time.

== Awards and honors ==
=== Big East Conference honors ===
Postseason honors
Honors	Player	Position	Date awarded	Ref.
All-Big East Honorable Mention	Rodney Pryor	G	March 4, 2017	
