= 2014–15 Georgetown Hoyas men's basketball team =

American college basketball season

2014–15 Georgetown Hoyas men's basketball

NCAA tournament, round of 32
- Conference: Big East

Ranking
- AP: No. 22
- Record: 22–11 (12–6 Big East)
- Head coach: John Thompson III (11th season)
- Assistant coaches: Kevin Broadus (6th season); Tavaras Hardy (2nd season); Kevin Sutton (2nd season)
- Captains: D'Vauntes Smith-Rivera; Jabril Trawick
- Home arena: Verizon Center

2014–15 Big East men's basketball standings
	Conf.				Overall
Team	W		L	PCT	W		L	PCT
No. 2 Villanova †	16	–	2	.889	33	–	3	.917
No. 22 Georgetown	12	–	6	.667	22	–	11	.667
No. 24 Butler	12	–	6	.667	23	–	11	.676
Providence	11	–	7	.611	22	–	12	.647
St. John's	10	–	8	.556	21	–	12	.636
Xavier	9	–	9	.500	23	–	14	.622
DePaul	6	–	12	.333	12	–	20	.375
Seton Hall	6	–	12	.333	16	–	15	.516
Marquette	4	–	14	.222	13	–	19	.406
Creighton	4	–	14	.222	14	–	19	.424
† 2015 Big East tournament winner As of April 6, 2015; Rankings from AP poll

The 2014–15 Georgetown Hoyas men's basketball team represented Georgetown University in the 2014–15 NCAA Division I men's basketball season. They were led by 11th year head coach John Thompson III, were members of the Big East Conference, and played their home games at the Verizon Center. They finished the season 22–11, 12–6 in Big East play to finish in a tie for second place. They advanced to the semifinals of the Big East tournament where they lost to Xavier. They received an at-large bid to the NCAA tournament where they defeated Eastern Washington in the second round before losing in the third round to Utah.

== Previous season ==
The Hoyas finished the previous season 18–15, 8–10 in Big East play, to finish in seventh place. They lost in the first round of the Big East tournament to DePaul. They were invited to the 2014 National Invitation Tournament, in which they lost in the second round to Florida State.

== Departures ==
Name	Number	Pos.	Height	Weight	Year	Hometown	Notes
Markel Starks	5	G	6'2"	175	Senior	Accokeek, MD	Graduated
John Caprio	25	G	6'6"	220	Senior	North Caldwell, NJ	Graduated
Moses Ayegba	32	C	6'9"	247	Senior	Kano, Nigeria	Transferred to Nebraska
Nate Lubick	34	F	6'8"	219	Senior	Southborough, MA	Graduated

== Recruiting ==
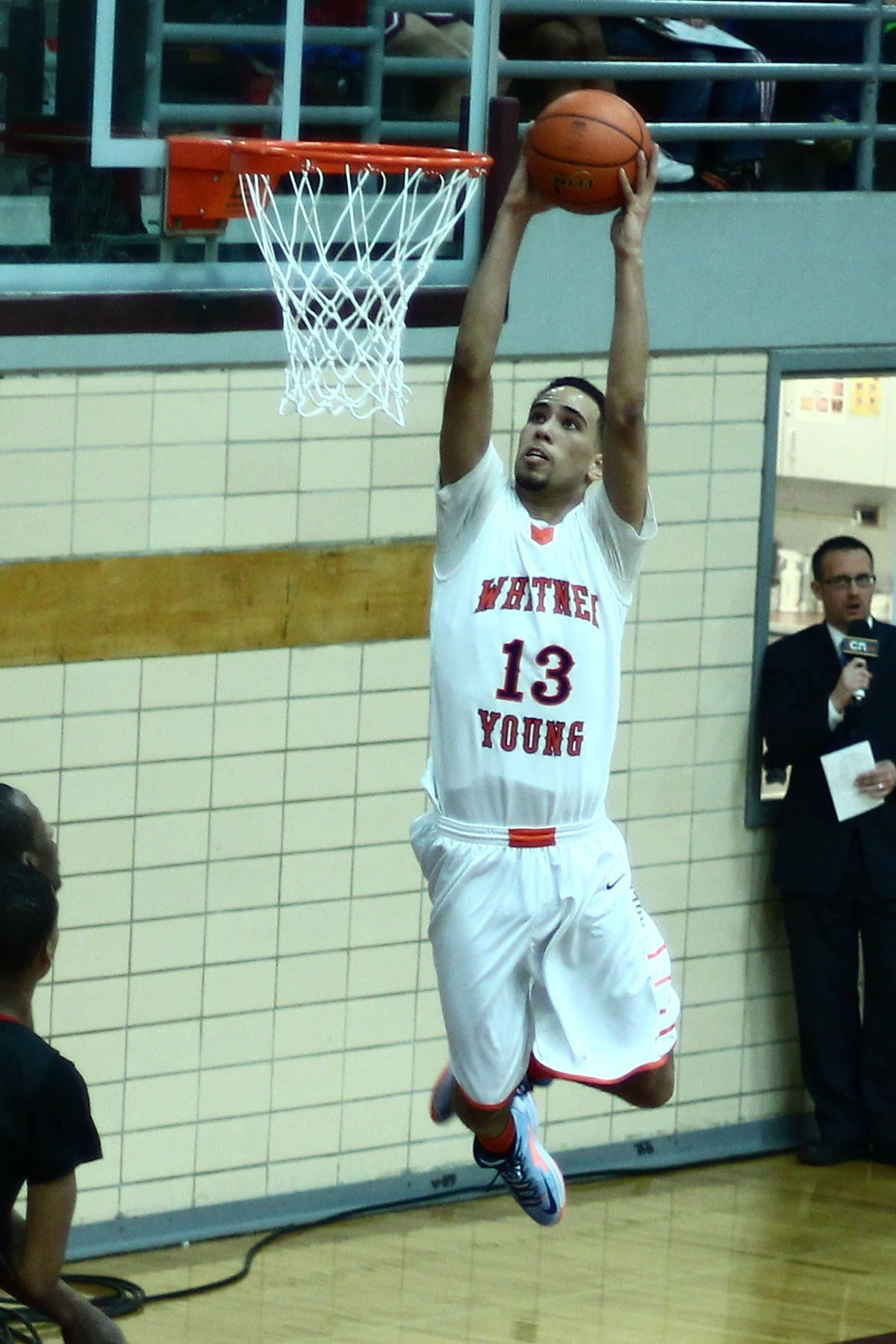
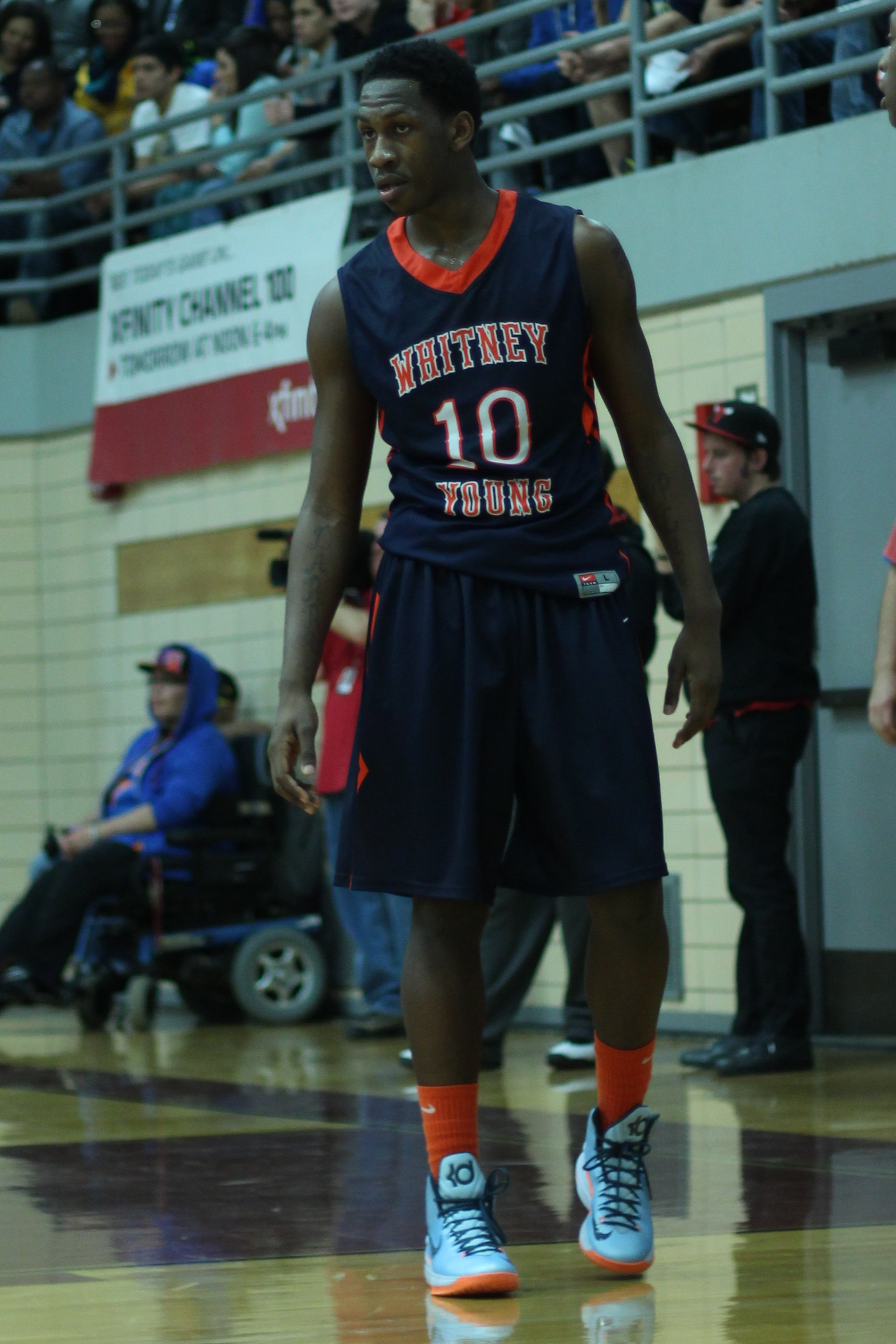
Incoming freshmen Paul White (left) and L. J. Peak (right) were teammates at Whitney M. Young Magnet High School in Chicago before coming to Georgetown.

College recruiting information
Name	Hometown	School	Height	Weight	Commit date
Isaac Copeland; PF	Raleigh, NC	Brewster Academy	6 ft 9 in (2.06 m)	210 lb (95 kg)	Mar 10, 2013
Isaac Copeland; PF	Recruit ratings: Scout: Rivals: (94)				
L. J. Peak; SF	Gaffney, SC	Gaffney	6 ft 5 in (1.96 m)	190 lb (86 kg)	Jul 2, 2013
L. J. Peak; SF	Recruit ratings: Scout: Rivals: (89)				
Paul White; PF	Chicago, IL	Whitney Young	6 ft 8 in (2.03 m)	185 lb (84 kg)	Sep 15, 2013
Paul White; PF	Recruit ratings: Scout: Rivals: (89)				
Tre Campbell; SG	Washington, D.C.	St. John's College	6 ft 2 in (1.88 m)	170 lb (77 kg)	May 8, 2013
Tre Campbell; SG	Recruit ratings: Scout: Rivals: (77)				
Overall recruit ranking:
Note: In many cases, Scout, Rivals, 247Sports, On3, and ESPN may conflict in their listings of height and weight.; In these cases, the average was taken. ESPN grades are on a 100-point scale.; Sources: "2014 Georgetown Signees". Rivals.; "2014 Georgetown Signees". Scout.; "2014 Georgetown Signees". ESPN.; "Scout.com Team Recruiting Rankings". Scout.; "2014 Team Ranking". Rivals.

== Season recap ==
Since the conclusion of the previous season, Georgetown had lost four players to graduation: Most notably, point guard Markel Starks, who had finished the 2013–2014 season as the team's second-leading scorer, had graduated, as had forward Nate Lubick and reserve guard John Caprio. The fourth graduate was Moses Ayegba who, after three years as a reserve center at Georgetown, had opted to transfer to Nebraska to play out his final year of collegiate eligibility.

Returning for 2014–2015 were the team's leading scorer from 2013–2014, junior guard D'Vauntes Smith-Rivera – a shooting guard while Starks was on the team but taking on point guard duties this season – as well as junior guard Jabril Trawick, senior forward Mikael Hopkins, sophomore power forward Reggie Cameron, and junior reserve center Bradley Hayes. Reserve forward Aaron Bowen, a redshirt senior the previous season, had a year of collegiate eligibility remaining due to a freshman season cut short by surgery, and, although he had the option of transferring elsewhere to play out his eligibility without sitting out a season, he opted to play at Georgetown in 2014–2015 as a fifth-year senior. Two junior guards made the team as walk-ons, David Allen for the third straight season and Riyan Williams, the son of former Georgetown great Reggie Williams, who had walked on the previous season and had made the roster in January 2014. Senior center Tyler Adams, sidelined early in his freshman season by heart arrhythmia, spent the season on a medical hardship waiver that allowed him to continue at Georgetown on a scholarship without counting against the team's scholarship total. Relegated to the bench for another year, he made the most of the situation, acting as a de facto assistant coach, although he made a brief appearance on the court in Georgetown's final home game of the season.

Most notably, senior center Joshua Smith returned. Criticism that he lacked maturity and a commitment to physical fitness and to playing winning basketball had dogged Smith earlier in his collegiate career when he spent parts of three seasons at UCLA, and John Thompson III had suspended him the previous season for academic reasons after only 13 games with the Hoyas; that suspension had become an outright dismissal from the team shortly afterward when he continued to struggle in his classes, although the dismissal came with the understanding that he could return for the 2014–2015 season if his grades improved enough. By the fall 2014 semester, he had resolved his academic problems, and Georgetown allowed him to rejoin the team for the 2014–2015 season. When suspended, he had been the 2013–2014 team's third-leading scorer and was a key part of Georgetown's offense, and his departure that season had led to a steep drop in the 2013–2014's team's fortunes. Although Smith's performance had declined noticeably during the last few games before his suspension, he and Smith-Rivera were the only returning Georgetown players who had averaged in double figures for the 2013–2014 season. Arriving in the fall of 2014 30 pounds (13.6 kg) lighter than the year before and having undergone an offseason fitness regimen, Smith again was expected to serve as the centerpiece of Georgetown's offense.

Five freshmen – guard Tre Campbell, small forward L. J. Peak, and forwards Isaac Copeland, Paul White, and Trey Mourning – joined the team. Mourning was the son of former Georgetown and National Basketball Association great Alonzo Mourning, and his arrival marked the fourth time in Georgetown basketball history that the son of a former player had joined the team.

=== Nonconference schedule ===
Georgetown began its season with three wins at the Verizon Center, defeating St. Francis Brooklyn, Texas A&M–Corpus Christi, and Robert Morris. Facing St. Francis Brooklyn in his first game as a Hoya, L. J. Peak went 9-for-9 from the field, including a three-pointer, and 4-for-8 from the free-throw line to finish with 23 points, while Jabril Trawick added 11 points, Joshua Smith – returning to action for the first time since January 4, 2014 – scored 10, and Mikael Hopkins grabbed 10 rebounds. Against Texas A&M–Corpus Christi four days later, Smith had the first double-double of his Georgetown career, scoring 20 points and pulling down 12 rebounds, and Aaron Bowen came off the bench for 13 points and five steals, while Hopkins scored 12 points and Peak 10. Smith had another double-double in the Robert Morris game, scoring 22 points and grabbing 11 rebounds against the Colonials, and D'Vauntes Smith-Rivera had his first double-figure outing of the season as he and Peak scored 12 points each, while Hopkins pulled down 10 rebounds and scored six points. Robert Morris junior guard Rodney Pryor, who two years later would play for Georgetown during the 2016–2017 season, came off the bench for a team-high 16 points for the Colonials.

Next, the Hoyas left the United States to play in the Battle 4 Atlantis, an annual tournament held at Atlantis Paradise Island on Paradise Island in Nassau in the Bahamas. In the tournament's opening quarterfinal round, they faced their first ranked opponent of the season, No. 18 Florida. It was the first time the teams had met since November 2012, when their game was canceled after the first half due to condensation on the court and never completed, and it was the first game they completed against one another since Florida's 2006 national championship team knocked the Hoyas out of the 2006 NCAA tournament. The game was a wild one that saw 21 lead changes. The Hoyas held the Gators to 36 percent shooting from the field, and although no Hoya scored more than six points in the first half, Georgetown went into the locker room at halftime with a 31–27 lead. Joshua Smith was called for two flagrant fouls during the game, one of which allowed Florida senior forward Jacob Kurtz to sink one of two free throws and give Florida a 44–42 lead with 7:07 left in regulation. Jabril Trawick fouled out with 34.1 seconds left in regulation, but shortly afterward the Hoya defense collapsed on Florida redshirt junior guard Eli Carter to prevent him from scoring, and the second half ended with the teams tied 53–53. In overtime, Gator sophomore guard Kasey Hill completed a three-point play with 11.5 seconds remaining to put Florida ahead 65–64, but D'Vauntes Smith-Rivera scored on a jumper with 3.4 seconds left to give Georgetown a 66–65 upset win. The game continued a streak that made 2014–2015 the first season since 1949-1950 that Florida had not scored at least 70 points in any of its first four games. Smith-Rivera had a game-high 17 points, while Paul White had his first double-digit game as a Hoya with 10 points and Jabril Trawick also scored 10 before fouling out.

Georgetown advanced to the semifinals to meet an even more challenging opponent, No. 2 Wisconsin, which had defeated UAB easily in the first round. The game was the first meeting between Wisconsin and Georgetown since December 28, 1982. The Hoyas made their first six shots and by halfway through the first half were shooting 61 percent from the field and leading 19–16; Georgetown led for all but 56 seconds of the first half, but Wisconsin led 35–34 at halftime. Wisconsin fell behind in the second half, the first time all season the Badgers had trailed in the second half of a game, and Georgetown built a lead of nine points, 53–44, with 11:36 left to play. But Georgetown missed eight of its last 10 shots while the Badgers went on a decisive 22–6 run – during which Badger redshirt senior forward Duje Dukan scored all eight of his points in the game over a stretch of 80 seconds – to pull ahead 62–59 with 4:27 left to play and 66–59 with 1:53 remaining. D'Vauntes Smith Rivera, who had made all five of his previous three-point attempts, missed his last one, a potential game-tying shot which rimmed out as time expired, and, although Georgetown held the lead for all but 9 minutes 20 seconds of the game, Wisconsin came away with a 68–65 win and advanced to play Oklahoma in the tournament's championship game. The game saw 29 turnovers, 15 of them Georgetown's, and Wisconsin took decisive advantage of free-throw opportunities, going 13-for-18 (72.2 percent) from the line to Georgetown's 1-for-2. Smith-Rivera had a game-high 29 points, and Joshua Smith was the only other Hoya to score in double digits with 10 points.

Georgetown moved on to the third-place game, meeting Big East rival Butler, which had beaten North Carolina in the quarterfinals and lost to Oklahoma in its semifinal game. Although NCAA rules ordinarily precluded two teams from the same conference from playing in the same early-season tournament, Butler received a waiver to play in the Battle 4 Atlantis because it did not decide to join the new Big East Conference until after accepting an invitation to the tournament. From the field, Butler had shot 49-for-119 (41.2 percent) in the tournament, including weak shooting early in the Georgetown game, but then the Bulldogs began making shots, pulling out to a 21–13 lead that was the first time in school history they ever had led the Hoyas by more than seven points, and shooting 9-for-11 during one stretch in the second half. Butler prevailed 64–58, Georgetown's first loss to Butler in four meetings all-time between the schools. Against the Bulldogs, Isaac Copeland scored in double figures for the first time in his collegiate career, shooting 7-for-10 from the field and scoring 16 points, while Paul White added 13, and D'Vauntes Smith-Rivera finished with 12. The Hoyas had been called for at least 20 fouls in all three games they played in the Bahamas and were outscored 49-34 from the free-throw line; they had seen all three of their Battle 4 Atlantis games decided in the final minute and two of them on the final shot, and they went 1–2 and finished in fourth place in the 2014 Battle 4 Atlantis.

After nine days off, the Hoyas opened a four-game homestand at the Verizon Center that began with an easy win over Towson in which five Hoyas scored in double figures, with D'Vauntes Smith-Rivera finishing with a game-high 16 points, Paul White with 14 – including 4-of-5 shooting from three-point range – Joshua Smith with 12, Jabril Trawick with 11, and Isaac Copeland with 10. It was Georgetown's first appearance in the annual BB&T Classic. Three days later, they hosted No. 10 Kansas, their third ranked opponent of the season. During warm-ups, the national anthem, and pregame handshakes, the entire Georgetown roster wore black T-shirts emblazoned with "I CAN′T BREATHE" in white lettering, which Joshua Smith explained to reporters was an expression of sympathy to the family of Eric Garner, whose death while being arrested by New York City police officers in July 2014 was a matter of national controversy in the United States after a grand jury declined to indict the officers involved. Entering the game – the return visit for a home-and-home series in which Georgetown had traveled to play Kansas the previous season – the Jayhawks were 6–1 and had won five games in a row. The game had no flow, with 33 turnovers and 58 free throws taken by the two teams combined, and both Jayhawk sophomore guard Brannen Greene and Georgetown's Mikael Hopkins had four fouls by midway through the second half. Neither of the teams′ leading scorers – Perry Ellis for Kansas and D'Vauntes Smith-Rivera for Georgetown – had a good offensive performance, Ellis going 4-for-15 (26.7 percent) and Smith-Rivera 3-for-15 (20.0 percent) from the field. Brannen Greene scored a career-high 19 points for Kansas, 16 of them in the second half, but Joshua Smith led all scorers with 20 points, while L. J. Peak had 18 and Paul White and Smith-Rivera contributed 10 each. Jabril Trawick suffered a bone bruise in a collision with Greene during the game. A key officiating decision came with 18 seconds left to play and Kansas leading 71–67, when the ball went out of bounds after Isaac Copeland missed a three-pointer and the referees could not determine whose possession it was; they decided to call it a jump ball, which, because of the alternating possession rule, gave the Jayhawks the ball. Greene promptly drew a foul by Copeland and made both free throws to give Kansas a 73–67 lead with 16 seconds left. The Jayhawks hung on for a 75–70 victory.

The homestand continued with an easy win over Radford in which Georgetown's bench players shined, scoring 42 points, with Aaron Bowen leading the way with a game-high and career-high 16 points and Paul White adding 12. Charlotte visited a week later and lost a much closer game in which the Hoyas had to turn back a last-second 49ers upset bid. In a balanced Georgetown attack, L. J. Peak led all scorers with 18 points, D'Vauntes Smith-Rivera had 13, Joshua Smith scored 12, and Jabril Trawick had a double-double with 11 points and 10 rebounds, while Aaron Bowen came off the bench to add another 11 points.

A week later, Georgetown rounded out its non-conference schedule by visiting Madison Square Garden to meet Indiana in the Indeed Invitational. Despite getting in early foul trouble, Joshua Smith played a key role in the Hoyas′ overtime win over the Hoosiers, scoring 14 points, while D'Vauntes Smith-Rivera scored a game-high 29, Aaron Bowen came off the bench to score 22 – a new career high for him – on 10-for-13 (76.9 percent) shooting from the field, and Jabril Trawick contributed 12. For the second season a row, the Hoyas finished their non-conference schedule with a record of 8–3. All three of their losses had come against teams either ranked at the time of the game or, in the case of Butler, soon afterward.

=== Conference schedule ===
The Associated Press Poll ranked the Hoyas No. 25 at the end of December – their first national ranking since the final poll of the 2012-2013 season – just in time for the Big East Conference season to begin with a full slate of five games on December 31, 2014. Georgetown – picked pre-season by the Big East's coaches for the second season in a row to finish second in the conference – opened the season with a visit to Xavier, where D'Vauntes Smith Rivera, who entered the game as the conference's fifth-leading scorer, was booed throughout the game because Xavier had recruited him heavily and he had chosen Georgetown instead. Although the Hoyas held the Musketeers 11 points below their season scoring average, Xavier also held Georgetown to its lowest point total of the season, and Xavier won 70–53 in an upset despite 18 points by Smith-Rivera and 10 by Joshua Smith.

The Hoyas returned to the Verizon Center and began 2015 with two wins, beating Creighton and Marquette. In the Creighton game, with the Hoyas wearing pink shoelaces for Georgetown's second annual Men Against Breast Cancer game, Joshua Smith scored 14 points and Jabril Trawick added 12, but three freshman – L. J. Peak with 14 points, Tre Campbell with 13, and Paul White with 10 – combined for 37 of Georgetown's 76 points, including one stretch in which they scored 25 of 29 points, 13 of them in a row. It was the first time Campbell scored in double figures in a college game and the first time three Georgetown freshmen scored in double figures in the same game since January 18, 2005, when Jeff Green, Roy Hibbert, and Jonathan Wallace had each scored 12 in a loss at Syracuse. By the time the Hoyas hosted Marquette, they had fallen back out of the Top 25 thanks to the loss at Xavier, but they overcame their own cold shooting streak and a late surge by the Golden Eagles to win, thanks in part to 15 points by D'Vauntes Smith-Rivera, a double-double (12 points and 10 rebounds) by Joshua Smith, 13 points by L. J. Peak, and 12 by Jabril Trawick.

With a conference record of 2–1, Georgetown went on the road to visit Providence and DePaul. They lost to Providence in overtime, with D'Vauntes Smith-Rivera scoring 15 points, Joshua Smith recording another double-double with 15 points and 12 rebounds, and Paul White scoring 11 points off the bench, but recovered to beat DePaul – the team which upset them in the first round of the previous season's Big East tournament – for the 15th time in the past 16 meetings. Against the Blue Demons, D'Vauntes Smith-Rivera scored a game-high 25 points – including six of eight free throws he attempted in the final minute, part of a 26-for-32 (81.3 percent) Georgetown performance at the free-throw line – and Jabril Trawick added 11. The Hoyas then returned home to meet Butler – which had beaten them in November during the Battle 4 Atlantis, then risen to as high as No. 15 in the AP Poll in December before falling back out of the AP Top 25 – for the first conference game of the season between the teams. Bulldog redshirt junior forward Roosevelt Jones scored a career-high 28 points, and the lead seesawed back and forth ten times in the final 8:48 of the game, but Isaac Copeland hit a three-pointer in the final seconds to give Georgetown the lead and D'Vauntes Smith-Rivera – who led the Hoyas with 14 points – preserved a Hoya victory by blocking Jones's final layup. Copeland, Joshua Smith, and Jabril Trawick scored 10 points each against the Bulldogs.

Next to visit the Verizon Center was No. 4 Villanova, Georgetown's highest-ranked opponent since a meeting with No. 1 Indiana in November 2012. At 17–1 overall and 4–1 in the Big East, the Wildcats had won four in a row since suffering their only loss of the season in an overtime game at Seton Hall 16 days earlier. It was a physical game, with the teams combining for 50 fouls. The Hoyas forced 17 Wildcat turnovers and held Villanova to 34 percent shooting from the field; the Wildcats shot 2-for-10 from three-point range during the first half and scored only two points off fast breaks during the entire game. Georgetown, in contrast, shot 60 percent from the field in the first half and pulled away early, holding Villanova scoreless for over seven minutes during a 17–0 Hoya scoring run that built a 30–11 Georgetown lead, and Georgetown went into the locker room ahead 42–20 at halftime. The Hoyas led by as many as 26 points in the second half. Villanova junior guard Ryan Arcidiacono, who finished with 16 points, hit three three-pointers that helped the Wildcats close to 62–50 with eight minutes to play while Jabril Trawick sat on the bench for several minutes after getting hit in the eye, but Georgetown then went on a 6–0 run to open up a 68–50 lead. Villanova junior forward Daniel Ochefu, coming off a career-high 21 points against Pennsylvania two days earlier, scored only four points before fouling out with 4:13 remaining in the game. The Hoyas shot 51 percent from the field for the game and won 78–58. D'Vauntes Smith-Rivera, who had been announced as Big East Player of the Week earlier in the day, and Isaac Copeland each had 17 points – a career high for Copeland – to lead all scorers, while Jabril Trawick added 10 points and Joshua Smith had nine points and eight rebounds. Georgetown's 20-point upset put the Hoyas in first place in the Big East at 4–1, a half-game ahead of 4–2 Villanova, and the Georgetown student section stormed the court in celebration. The Hoyas stretched their winning streak to four games five days later with an overtime victory at Marquette, featuring a balanced attack in which D'Vauntes Smith-Rivera had 19 points including five three-pointers, Joshua Smith recorded another double-double with 18 points and 15 rebounds, Isaac Copeland scored 17 points, and Mikael Hopkins added 13, while Tre Campbell and Aaron Bowen both came off the bench to score in double figures, Campbell finishing with 14 points and Bowen with 11.

Georgetown returned to the AP Top 25 after a three-week absence, ranked No. 21 in time for a return to the Verizon Center and the second meeting with Xavier of the season. L. J. Peak, who had injured his left ankle in the Marquette game, sat out the first five minutes, allowing Isaac Copeland to make his first collegiate start. D'Vauntes Smith-Rivera scored 13 points, Peak had 12, and Joshua Smith contributed 10, but the Hoyas shot only 39 percent from the field and committed a season-high 17 turnovers, six of them by Jabril Trawick, who started despite suffering a bruised right thigh against Marquette. Xavier held Georgetown without a field goal for more than 11 minutes in the first half, and Georgetown's 16 points in the half were its fewest first-half points since it scored 16 in the first half of a game against Tennessee in November 2012. Georgetown had another scoring drought of over three minutes in the second half, and Xavier held Georgetown to only 53 points for the game, tying the Hoyas′ season low set in the game at Xavier on January 3. The Musketeers won 66–53, sweeping the season series with Georgetown and snapping their own road losing streak of five games dating back to the previous season – Xavier's longest road losing streak since an eight-game skid across two seasons in 1987. Georgetown's winning streak ended at four, dropping the Hoyas into second place in the Big East at 6–3, albeit only percentage points behind Villanova and Providence, both 5–2 on the season. However, the Hoyas bounced back to close out January with a dominating win against last-place Creighton in which no Creighton player scored in double figures and at one point the Bluejays went scoreless for 17 minutes 18 seconds. Georgetown held the Bluejays to 40 points and 20.8 percent shooting from the field, the lowest shooting percentage by a Big East team since Marquette shot 18.9 percent against Ohio State on November 16, 2013, and the lowest in a Big East game since West Virginia shot 20 percent against Cincinnati in the original Big East on January 30, 2008.

Dropping to No. 24 in the AP Poll, the Hoyas began February by suffering a loss at home to Providence, which used a 20-6 run in the second half – with Georgetown going without a field goal for the final 7:41 of the game – to fuel a come-from-behind win that broke a 31-road-game Providence losing streak against ranked teams and a seven-game Hoya winning streak at home against the Friars. The Friars completed a season sweep of the Hoyas despite 21 points by D'Vauntes Smith-Rivera, 10 by Joshua Smith, and Tre Campbell and Isaac Copeland coming off the bench to score 10 each. The Hoyas then traveled to Philadelphia for a rematch with Villanova, now ranked No. 7 and sporting a 21–2 record overall and 8–2 in the Big East, before a large crowd at the Wells Fargo Center. The Wildcats wore 1985 throwback uniforms in celebration of Villanova's upset triumph 30 years earlier over the 1984–1985 Hoyas in the 1985 NCAA tournament′s national championship game. Villanova pulled out to an early 17-point lead and led by as many as 24 points on 12-for-24 three-point shooting, a 50 percent performance well above the 36 percent they had shot from beyond the arc entering the game. In contrast, Georgetown's two leading scorers – D'Vauntes Smith-Rivera with 15.8 and Joshua Smith with 11.9 points per game – managed only a combined nine points on 4-for-11 (36.4 percent) shooting, and the Hoyas as a team shot only 1-for-17 (5.9 percent) from three-point range and 30 percent from the field overall. The Hoyas trailed 37-24 at the half and never mounted a comeback, ultimately losing 69–53, tying their lowest point total of the season with the 53 points they scored in each of the Xavier games. L. J. Peak with 15 points and Aaron Bowen with 10 off the bench were the only Hoyas to score in double figures.

Losers of three out of four, the Hoyas fell back out of the Top 25, but they promptly embarked on a three-game winning streak with victories at Seton Hall and at home against St. John's and DePaul to improve to 18–8 on the season and 10–5 in the conference. At Seton Hall, the Hoyas jumped out to a 27–7 lead before the Pirates came back to tie the game at 44–44, but Georgetown then built a lead again to win 86–67; D'Vauntes Smith-Rivera scored a game-high 23 points and Isaac Copeland had two career highs with 20 points and eight rebounds, while Jabril Trawick added 12 points. Hosting St. John's a week later, Copeland had a double-double with 12 points and a new career high of 10 rebounds, while Smith-Rivera, Joshua Smith, and L. J. Peak also each scored 12, Trawick added 11, and Mikael Hopkins came off the bench also to score 12. The win over DePaul four days later – the Hoyas′ 16th victory over the Blue Demons in the past 17 meetings – gave Georgetown sole possession of second place in the Big East, with Smith-Rivera leading all scorers in the game with 19 points, Joshua Smith recording another double-double (15 points and 10 rebounds), Copeland scoring 12, and Trawick adding 10. Traveling to Madison Square Garden for a rematch with St. John's on the last day of February, however, the Hoyas stumbled, losing to the Red Storm despite Smith-Rivera's 29 points and a double-double (10 points, 12 rebounds) and three steals by Mikael Hopkins.

Georgetown next visited No. 21 Butler for their second conference meeting and third meeting overall of the season. The Bulldogs forced 15 turnovers and outrebounded the Hoyas 39–20, including 17–2 on the offensive end, and outscored Georgetown 15–2 in second-chance points, but the underdog Hoyas blocked ten shots and held the Bulldogs to 35.3 percent shooting from the field. Butler also failed to take full advantage of free-throw opportunities, going 10-for-22 (45.5 percent) from the line. Butler's top-scoring player, junior guard Kellen Dunham, went scoreless for the first 26 1/2 minutes and for the final 11 1/2 minutes and finished with only eight points. The Hoyas led 30–24 at halftime and 34–24 early in the second half, but Butler came back to take a 40–39 lead with 11:35 remaining. Georgetown responded with five straight points to take a 44–40 lead with 8:56 to play. The Hoyas never trailed again, but had to fend off a Butler bid to tie or take the lead in the final seconds with heroics by D'Vauntes Smith-Rivera. With Georgetown clinging to a 56–54 lead, Joshua Smith missed a free throw with 10.2 seconds remaining and Bulldog senior forward Kameron Woods grabbed the rebound, but Smith-Rivera stole the ball from Woods and drew a foul by Butler sophomore forward Andrew Chrabascz. Smith-Rivera made both free throws to extend the lead to 58–54, then stole an inbounds pass by redshirt junior forward Austin Etherington with five seconds left, drew a foul by Bulldog redshirt junior forward Roosevelt Jones, and made two more free throws with four seconds left to seal a 60–54 Georgetown upset win. Smith Rivera scored 16 points before a home-town crowd in his native Indianapolis, while Joshua Smith contributed 10 and Tre Campbell added 10 off the bench.

Georgetown completed the regular season by hosting Seton Hall at the Verizon Center. Sidelined by heart arrhythmia since early in his freshman season in 2011, Georgetown senior center Tyler Adams had been relegated to the bench ever since under a medical hardship waiver that allowed him to remain on scholarship without counting against the school's scholarship total as long as he did not play, but he had been a steady presence and de facto assistant coach on the sidelines. In a process begun 16 months earlier, John Thompson III arranged for an NCAA waiver that allowed Adams to make a one-possession appearance against Seton Hall on Senior Day, the last home game before his graduation, something Thompson did not announce to Adams or anyone else on the team until two days before the game. Adams started the game and Seton Hall allowed him to make an uncontested dunk almost immediately, giving Georgetown a 2–0 lead, to an ovation by the Verizon Center crowd; it was an emotional moment for both Adams and his teammates. Thompson immediately called a timeout and Adams exited the game, but Georgetown played on to defeat the Pirates, sweeping the season series with them. Leading Georgetown scorer D'Vauntes Smith-Rivera sat out the game with a lower body injury – the only game he missed all season – but Jabril Trawick scored 19 points and Tre Campbell 13. The Hoyas finished the regular season with a record of 20–6 overall and 12-6 in the Big East, tied for second place with Butler.

=== Big East tournament ===
Georgetown rose into the AP Top 25 again, ranked No. 23 before the 2015 Big East tournament began at Madison Square Garden. Under tie-breaking criteria, the Big East Conference considered Georgetown to have finished in second place in the regular season, and so the Hoyas received the No. 2 seed in the tournament, giving them a bye in the first round. They began play in the quarterfinals, facing No. 10 seed Creighton, which had upset seventh-seeded DePaul in the first round to advance to meet Georgetown. The Hoyas led 31–25 at halftime, but the Bluejays came back in the second half despite the loss of senior guard Avery Dingman, who went to the locker room after suffering an injury in a collision with eight minutes left to play, and Creighton led 51–45 with about six minutes to play. With five minutes left to play, however, D'Vauntes Smith-Rivera took control of the game, scoring 12 of Georgetown's final 14 points with a three-pointer, a three-point play, a driving two-point shot as he fell down, and four free throws, the last of which he sank with 3.2 seconds remaining. The Bluejays, meanwhile, committed three of their 18 turnovers during the game's final 2:15. Georgetown won 60–55, completing a three-game sweep of Creighton for the season. Georgetown's front court had an off game – L. J. Peak scored only three points and Isaac Copeland only two, and both were scoreless in the first half –but D'Vauntes Smith-Rivera finished with 25 points and Joshua Smith with 10. Georgetown had 11 steals, three of them by Jabril Trawick, and although Creighton outrebounded Georgetown 31–28, the Hoyas had a big advantage at the free-throw line, going 20-for-26 (76.9 percent) while Creighton went 6-for-8 (75 percent).

Georgetown advanced to the Big East tournament semifinals for the first time since 2013 to face sixth-seeded Xavier, which had upset the tournament's third seed, No. 22 Butler, the previous day to advance. Xavier took a 36–26 lead at halftime, and extended its lead to 20 points with 7:53 left in the game. Georgetown then went on a 15–1 scoring run, with Isaac Copeland contributing 11 points in a little over four minutes during the rally, while the Musketeers, who led the Big East in free-throw shooting percentage, went 1-for-7 (14.3 percent) from the line. Xavier freshman forward Trevon Bluiett finally brought the Georgetown run to an end with a three-pointer that gave the Musketeers a 57–48 lead with 3:38 left to play. Georgetown continued to close the gap, however, and with 14.7 seconds remaining, Xavier's lead had diminished to 60–59. Then the Musketeers began making free throws again, sinking four in a row and extending their lead to 64–61 with 4.6 seconds remaining. With 1.9 seconds left to play, Jabril Trawick came to the free throw line for two shots; he intended to make the first one – which he did, reducing Xavier's lead to 64-62 – and then deliberately miss the second one to give his team a chance at a rebound and a tying or winning field goal. But Trawick accidentally made his second shot as well, reducing Xavier's lead to 64–63 but giving Xavier possession of the ball. The Hoyas fouled Xavier junior forward James Farr immediately; Farr made his first free throw at the other end and missed the second, but Paul White grabbed the rebound too late even for one last desperate heave down the court before time expired. Making five of its last six free throws in the game's final 10.6 seconds, Xavier upset Georgetown 65–63, completing a three-game season sweep of the Hoyas and advancing to face Villanova in the tournament championship game the following evening.

=== NCAA tournament ===
With a record of 21–10 and climbing to No. 22 in the AP Poll, Georgetown received a bid to the 2015 NCAA tournament, its 30th appearance in the tournament, eighth appearance in the past ten seasons, and first since 2013. Seeded No. 4 in the South Region, the Hoyas opened play in the Round of 64 (known as the "Second Round" that season), by meeting the region's No. 13 seed, Eastern Washington of the Big Sky Conference, at the Moda Center in Portland, Oregon. The Hoyas had lost four of the last five NCAA tournament games they had played, all of them to teams seeded 10th or lower; Eastern Washington entered the game averaging 80.8 points per game and had the leading Division I scorer in the United States in redshirt junior guard Tyler Harvey, who was averaging 22.9 points per game. During an interview on a national radio show the day before the game, Eastern Washington head coach Jim Hayford extolled the virtues of his team and promised that the Eagles, who were making only the second NCAA tournament appearance in school history and first since 2004, would beat the Hoyas in an upset. Joshua Smith got into early foul trouble and spent long stretches on the bench while the Eagles spread the floor and played a fast game, attempting a barrage of three-pointers; they made six of their first 12 three-point attempts, and they hit three of them in a row to take a 24–17 lead midway through the first half, raising fears on the Georgetown team that they were destined to lose in another NCAA tournament first-round upset at the hands of a double-digit seed. But with both Smith and Mikael Hopkins on the bench with foul trouble, Thompson turned to unheralded junior reserve center Bradley Hayes, who had spent three seasons in obscurity on the bench. Hayes responded to the opportunity with the breakout game of his career, playing the final 10 minutes of the first half; he scored a career-high eight points, making all three lay-ups and both free throws he attempted, pulled down a career-high six rebounds, and recorded an assist. He did not play after halftime, but in no small part thanks to his efforts, as well as to the Hoyas sinking their share of three-pointers, Georgetown pulled out to a 43–33 lead at the half. Hayes's ten minutes of play turned out to be the turning point of the game. Georgetown opened the second half with a 15–2 scoring run that culminated in back-to-back three-pointers by D'Vauntes Smith-Rivera, stretching the Hoyas′ lead to 58–35. The Eagles closed to a seven-point deficit in the final seconds, but finally succumbed despite Harvey's game-high 27 points. Georgetown won 84–74, its first NCAA tournament victory since 2012, shooting 11-for-23 (47.8 percent) from three-point range for the game, while Eastern Washington shot 9-for-28 (32.1 percent) in three-pointers. Smith-Rivera had 25 points and Mikael Hopkins scored 10 and had nine rebounds, while Jabril Trawick and Paul White also contributed 10 points each. Eastern Washington exited with an all-time NCAA tournament record of 0–2.

The Hoyas advanced to the Round of 32 (termed the "Third Round" this season) for the first time since 2012 to face the South Region's fifth seed, No. 19 Utah, which had defeated 12th-seeded Stephen F. Austin to advance to meet Georgetown. The game was a contrast between Georgetown's "Princeton offense" and Utah's motion offense, and the Utes had initial trouble with the Hoyas, who used perimeter shooting to build an 11-point lead early in the first half. However, Utah battled back to tie the game at 32–32 at halftime and had a 57–53 lead late in the second half. The Hoyas kept the game close, and L. J. Peak scored on a layup to hold Utah's lead to 61–57 with 3:06 left. After that, however, Utah scored on a three-pointer and a layup to take a decisive 66-59 lead with 1:40 remaining and the Utes went on to upset the Hoyas 75–64, bringing Georgetown's season to a close. Peak led the Hoyas with 18 points, Isaac Copeland had 14, D'Vantes Smith-Rivera contributed 12, and Jabril Trawick – playing his final game as a Hoya – scored 10. For the sixth straight time since their Final Four appearance in 2007, the Hoyas exited the NCAA tournament in its first weekend due to an upset by a lower-seeded opponent. They again dropped out of the Top 25 in the final national rankings for the season.

=== Wrap-up ===
D'Vauntes Smith-Rivera was the team's leading scorer for the season; he missed one game late in the season due to injury but started the other 32, shooting 42.1 percent from the field overall and 38.7 percent in three-pointers, averaging 16.3 points and 4.2 rebounds per game. Joshua Smith played in all 33 games, starting all but one of them, and averaged 10.8 points and 5.8 rebounds per game, shooting 62.1 percent from the field. Jabril Trawick started all 33 games, shooting 49.2 percent in field-goal attempts and 40.7 percent from three-point range, and he averaged 9.1 points and 3.6 rebounds per game. Playing in all 33 games and starting 32 of them, L. J. Peak averaged 7.9 points per game on 39.4 percent field-goal shooting and had 2.3 rebounds per game. Isaac Copeland, Mikael Hopkins, Tre Campbell, Aaron Bowen, and Paul White also played in every game. Copeland had 11 starts and finished with 6.8 points per game on 45.1 percent shooting from the field and had 3.8 rebounds per game, Hopkins stated 24 times, shot 43.8 percent, and averaged 5.1 points and 5.8 rebounds, and Campbell had one start and finished with 3.8 points per game. Bowen and White came off the bench in every game, Bowen shooting 52.9 percent from the field and finishing with 5.6 points and 2.0 rebounds per game and White averaging 5.0 points on 40.4 percent shooting and grabbing 2.8 rebounds per game. Reggie Cameron played in 23 games, all as a reserve, and averaged 1.2 points on 27.6 percent shooting.

Joshua Smith, Jabril Trawick, Mikael Hopkins, Aaron Bowen, and Tyler Adams all graduated after the season. Smith completed his abbreviated Georgetown career of one-and-a-half seasons having played in 46 games, starting all but one, shooting 63.1 percent from the field and averaging 11.0 points and 5.1 rebounds per game; he went undrafted in the 2015 National Basketball Association draft and then played professionally in the NBA Development League and overseas. Trawick had 74 starts in his 126 games, and he shot 46.6 percent from the field for his career, averaging 6.8 points and 2.7 rebounds per game. Over his five seasons at Georgetown – his seven-game freshman season cut short by surgery – Bowen played in 111 games and made one start, and he finished with a 48.3 percent field-goal percentage and 4.1 points and 2.0 rebounds per game. Hopkins had played in 128 games in his four years at Georgetown, starting 75 of them, shooting 42.3 percent from the field and averaging 4.9 points and 3.8 rebounds per game. Adams, sidelined for virtually his entire college career by his heart ailment, had made his real contribution through his support to the team during his four seasons on the bench. He graduated with only 24 minutes played in only five collegiate appearances, four of them early in his freshman season and one – his only start – on Senior Day of his senior year. He finished his college career with a total of 12 points – scored on 5-for-10 shooting from the field (one of his field goals being his uncontested senior-year dunk on Senior Day in 2015) and 2-for-2 free-throw shooting – and nine rebounds.

Georgetown announced on March 31, 2015, that D'Vauntes Smith-Rivera had decided to forego his senior year of college and enter the 2015 National Basketball Association draft, a sudden move that surprised observers, who had not ranked him highly as a National Basketball Association prospect. His decision to depart left the Hoyas facing a rebuilding year the following season. He did not hire an agent and, with his final year of college eligibility therefore intact, he decided a week later to withdraw his name from the draft pool and return to Georgetown for his senior year, causing expectations for the following year's team to soar. Speaking publicly about his decision for the first time on April 30, 2015, Smith-Rivera explained that he initially had decided to enter the NBA draft out of an abundance of confidence in himself and comfort with his abilities as a player, but that his parents had convinced him that returning to Georgetown and completing his education was a wiser choice for the following season.

With Joshua Smith back at center and playing the entire season, the 2014-15 Hoyas enjoyed success, finishing 22–11 overall and in second place in the Big East Conference, achieving a national ranking – No. 22 in the postseason AP Poll and No. 24 in the postseason Coaches Poll, although they dropped out of the Top 25 in both in the final polls of the season – and returning to the NCAA tournament after a one-year absence. However, the Hoyas' frustrations in the tournament continued, as they again exited early; in the eight seasons since the Final Four season of 2006-07, Georgetown had made six NCAA tournament appearances without ever advancing past the first weekend, and had gone 3–6 in tournament games, each time losing to a lower-seeded opponent. Despite this disappointment, 2014-15 was significant as the last winning season and the last season to include a postseason tournament appearance during John Thompson III's tenure at Georgetown. Although it was not apparent at the time, the Georgetown men's basketball program was about to slide into mediocrity. Over the next two seasons, Thompson would round out his Georgetown career with two straight losing records and no postseason bids – a trend that would continue after his departure into the first season under his successor, Patrick Ewing.

== Roster ==
When he joined the team this season, freshman forward Trey Mourning, the son of Alonzo Mourning, became only the fourth son of a former player to play for Georgetown, joining Riyan Williams, the son of Reggie Williams, who made the team as a walk-on for the second straight season. Other than Mourning and Williams, only two sons of former players had played at Georgetown: Patrick Ewing Jr., the son of Patrick Ewing, who played for Georgetown during the 2006-2007 and 2007-2008 seasons, and Ed Hargaden Jr., who played during the 1957-58, 1958-59, and 1959-60 seasons and was the son of Ed Hargaden, Georgetown's first All-American and star of the 1932-33, 1933-34, and 1934-35 teams.

2014–15 Georgetown Hoyas men's basketball team
Players
Coaches

Pos.	#	Name	Height	Weight	Year	Previous school	Hometown
SF	0	L. J. Peak	6 ft 5 in (1.96 m)	190 lb (86 kg)	Fr	Gaffney High School	Gaffney, South Carolina
G	1	Tre Campbell	6 ft 2 in (1.88 m)	170 lb (77 kg)	Fr	St. John's College High School	Washington, D.C.
F	3	Mikael Hopkins	6 ft 9 in (2.06 m)	223 lb (101 kg)	Sr	DeMatha Catholic High School	Hyattsville, Maryland
G	4	D'Vauntes Smith-Rivera	6 ft 3 in (1.91 m)	218 lb (99 kg)	Jr	North Central/Oak Hill Academy	Indianapolis, Indiana
PF	5	Reggie Cameron	6 ft 7 in (2.01 m)	225 lb (102 kg)	So	Hudson Catholic	Hackensack, New Jersey
C	10	Tyler Adams (injured)	6 ft 9 in (2.06 m)	254 lb (115 kg)	Sr	Brandon High School	Brandon, Mississippi
F	11	Isaac Copeland	6 ft 9 in (2.06 m)	210 lb (95 kg)	Fr	Brewster Academy	Raleigh, North Carolina
G	12	David Allen (W)	6 ft 2 in (1.88 m)	185 lb (84 kg)	Jr	Highland Park High School	Dallas, Texas
F	13	Paul White	6 ft 8 in (2.03 m)	185 lb (84 kg)	Fr	Whitney Young High School	Chicago, Illinois
G	21	Riyan Williams (W)	6 ft 4 in (1.93 m)	175 lb (79 kg)	Jr	Archbishop Carroll	Dunkirk, Maryland
F	23	Aaron Bowen	6 ft 6 in (1.98 m)	205 lb (93 kg)	RS Sr	Samuel W. Wolfson High School	Jacksonville, Florida
C	24	Joshua Smith	6 ft 10 in (2.08 m)	350 lb (159 kg)	Sr	Kentwood High School	Kent, Washington
F	31	Trey Mourning	6 ft 9 in (2.06 m)	217 lb (98 kg)	Fr	Ransom Everglades School	Miami, Florida
C	42	Bradley Hayes	7 ft 0 in (2.13 m)	251 lb (114 kg)	Jr	Sandalwood High School	Jacksonville, Florida
G	55	Jabril Trawick	6 ft 5 in (1.96 m)	210 lb (95 kg)	Sr	Abington Friends School	Jenkintown, Pennsylvania

Head coach

John Thompson III

Assistant coach(es)

Kevin Broadus
Tavaras Hardy
Kevin Sutton
Othella Harrington

Legend

- (C) Team captain
- (S) Suspended
- (I) Ineligible
- (W) Walk-on
- Injured
- Current redshirt

Roster
Last update: November 16, 2014

== Rankings ==
Ranking movements Legend: ██ Increase in ranking ██ Decrease in ranking RV = Received votes
	Week																			
Poll	Pre	2	3	4	5	6	7	8	9	10	11	12	13	14	15	16	17	18	Post	Final
AP	RV	RV	RV	RV	RV	RV	RV	25	RV	RV	RV	21	24	RV	RV	RV	RV	23	22	N/A
Coaches	RV	RV	RV	RV	RV	RV	RV	RV	RV	RV	RV	22	24	RV	RV	RV	RV	23	24	RV

== Schedule ==
Date time, TV	Rank^{#}	Opponent^{#}	Result	Record	Site (attendance) city, state
Non-conference regular season
11/15/2014*; 12:00 pm, FSN		St. Francis Brooklyn	W 83−62	1−0	Verizon Center (7,854); Washington, D.C.
11/18/2014*; 7:00 pm, FS2		Texas A&M–Corpus Christi	W 78−62	2−0	Verizon Center (4,887); Washington, D.C.
11/22/2014*; 12:00 pm, FS2		Robert Morris	W 80−66	3−0	Verizon Center (8,017); Washington, D.C.
11/26/2014*; 9:30 pm, AXS TV		vs. No. 18 Florida; Battle 4 Atlantis First Round	W 66–65 ^{OT}	4–0	Imperial Arena (3,240); Nassau, Bahamas
11/27/2014*; 3:30 pm, ESPN		vs. No. 2 Wisconsin; Battle 4 Atlantis Semifinal	L 65–68	4–1	Imperial Arena (3,204); Nassau, Bahamas
11/28/2014; 2:00 pm, ESPN		vs. Butler; Battle 4 Atlantis Fifth Place Game	L 58–64	4–2	Imperial Arena (1,542); Paradise Island, Bahamas
12/07/2014*; 12:00 pm, FS1		Towson; BB&T Classic	W 78–46	5–2	Verizon Center (8,756); Washington, D.C.
12/10/2014*; 7:00 pm, FS1		No. 10 Kansas	L 70–75	5–3	Verizon Center (14,164); Washington, D.C.
12/13/2014*; 12:00 pm, FS1		Radford	W 76–49	6–3	Verizon Center (6,843); Washington, D.C.
12/20/2014*; 12:00 pm, FSN		Charlotte	W 81–78	7–3	Verizon Center (7,858); Washington, D.C.
12/27/2014*; 12:00 pm, ESPN2		vs. Indiana; Indeed Invitational	W 91–87 ^{OT}	8–3	Madison Square Garden (8,651); New York, NY
Big East Conference Play
12/31/2014; 10:00 pm, FS1	No. 25	at Xavier	L 53–70	8–4 (0–1)	Cintas Center (9,558); Cincinnati, OH
01/03/2015; 4:30 pm, FS1	No. 25	Creighton	W 76–61	9–4 (1–1)	Verizon Center (11,164); Washington, D.C.
01/06/2015; 7:00 pm, FS1		Marquette	W 65–59	10–4 (2–1)	Verizon Center (8,762); Washington, D.C.
01/10/2015; 12:00 pm, FS1		at Providence	L 57–60 ^{OT}	10–5 (2–2)	Dunkin' Donuts Center (10,786); Providence, RI
01/13/2015; 9:15 pm, FS2/FS1 (Note: The broadcast began on Fox Sports 2 and moved to Fox Sports 1 while the game was in progress.)		at DePaul	W 78–72	11–5 (3–2)	Allstate Arena (6,263); Rosemont, IL
01/17/2015; 5:00 pm, FS1		Butler	W 61–59	12–5 (4–2)	Verizon Center (14,281); Washington, D.C.
01/19/2015; 9:00 pm, FS1		No. 4 Villanova	W 78–58	13–5 (5–2)	Verizon Center (13,872); Washington, DC
01/24/2015; 2:35 pm, FS1		at Marquette	W 95–85 ^{OT}	14–5 (6–2)	BMO Harris Bradley Center (15,713); Milwaukee, WI
01/27/2015; 7:00 pm, FS1	No. 21	Xavier	L 53–66	14–6 (6–3)	Verizon Center (8,576); Washington, D.C.
01/31/2015; 2:00 pm, CBSSN	No. 21	at Creighton	W 67–40	15–6 (7–3)	CenturyLink Center (17,499); Omaha, NE
02/04/2015; 9:10 pm, CBSSN	No. 24	Providence	L 71–74	15–7 (7–4)	Verizon Center (7,981); Washington, D.C.
02/07/2015; 2:00 pm, FOX	No. 24	at No. 7 Villanova	L 53–69	15–8 (7–5)	Wells Fargo Center (20,587); Philadelphia, PA
02/10/2015; 7:00 pm, FS1		at Seton Hall	W 86–67	16–8 (8–5)	Prudential Center (8,357); Newark, NJ
02/17/2015; 7:00 pm, FS1		St. John's	W 79–57	17–8 (9–5)	Verizon Center (8,685); Washington, D.C.
02/21/2015; 8:10 pm, CBSSN		DePaul	W 68–63	18–8 (10–5)	Verizon Center (7,984); Washington, D.C.
02/28/2015; 12:00 pm, CBS		at St. John's	L 70–81	18–9 (10–6)	Madison Square Garden (13,615); New York, NY
03/03/2015; 7:00 pm, FS1		at No. 21 Butler	W 60–54	19–9 (11–6)	Hinkle Fieldhouse (9,100); Indianapolis, IN
03/07/2015; 12:00 pm, FOX		Seton Hall	W 73–67	20–9 (12–6)	Verizon Center (14,392); Washington, D.C.
Big East tournament
3/12/2015; 7:00 pm, FS1	No. 23	vs. Creighton; Quarterfinals	W 60–55	21–9	Madison Square Garden (N/A); New York, NY
3/13/2015; 9:45 pm, FS1	No. 23	vs. Xavier; Semifinals	L 63–65	21–10	Madison Square Garden (15,194); New York, NY
NCAA tournament
3/19/2015*; 9:57 pm, truTV	(4 S) No. 22	vs. (13 S) Eastern Washington; Second round	W 84–74	22–10	Moda Center (14,279); Portland, OR
3/21/2015*; 7:45 pm, CBS	(4 S) No. 22	vs. (5 S) No. 19 Utah; Third round	L 64–75	22–11	Moda Center (17,370); Portland, OR
*Non-conference game. ^{#}Rankings from AP Poll. (#) Tournament seedings in parentheses. S=South Region. All times are in Eastern Time Zone.

== Awards and honors ==
=== Big East Conference honors ===
Postseason honors
Honors	Player	Position	Date awarded	Ref.
All-Big East First Team	D'Vauntes Smith-Rivera	G	March 8, 2015	
Big East All-Rookie Team	Isaac Copeland	F	March 8, 2015	
Big East All-Rookie Team	L. J. Peak	F	March 8, 2015	
