= Isaac Copeland =

American basketball player (born 1995)

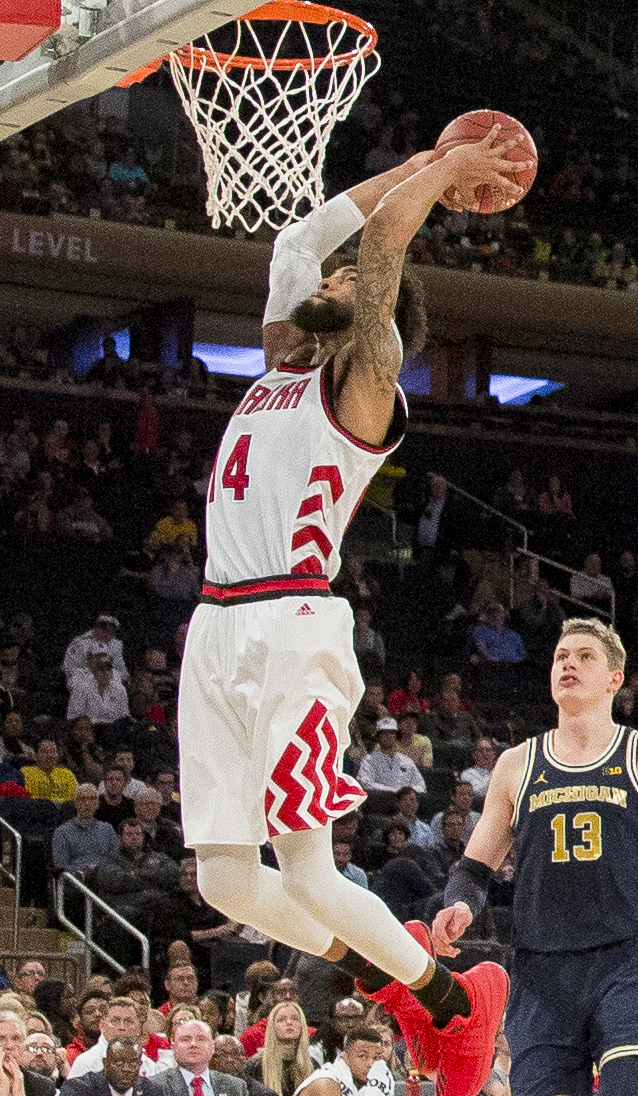
- Copeland with Nebraska in 2018

Personal information
- Born: June 13, 1995 (age 31) Greenville, North Carolina, U.S.
- Listed height: 6 ft 9 in (2.06 m)
- Listed weight: 220 lb (100 kg)

Career information
- High school: Ravenscroft School (Raleigh, North Carolina); Brewster Academy (Wolfeboro, New Hampshire)
- College: Georgetown (2014–2017); Nebraska (2017–2019)
- NBA draft: 2019: undrafted
- Playing career: 2019–present
- Position: Small forward / power forward

Career history
- 2019–2020: Texas Legends
- 2022–2023: Obras Sanitarias

Isaac Copeland Jr. (born June 13, 1995) is an American professional basketball player. He played college basketball for the Nebraska Cornhuskers and the Georgetown Hoyas.

== Early life ==
Copeland was born in Greenville, North Carolina and attended high school at Ravenscroft School in Raleigh, North Carolina and Brewster Academy in Wolfeboro, New Hampshire. He was a five-star recruit and signed to play with Georgetown in 2014.

== College career ==
Copeland initially played two full seasons at Georgetown but suffered a back injury in 2016, requiring surgery, resulting in a medical redshirt season. He subsequently transferred to Nebraska mid-season but did not practice with the team during his rehabilitation. He spent his remaining two seasons with Nebraska, but tore his ACL near the end of his senior season, resulting in missing his final games at Nebraska. Teammate Isaiah Roby wore Copeland's uniform during Senior Day to honor the injured Copeland. Copeland was an All-Big Ten honorable mention as a junior after finishing second on the team in scoring (12.9 points per game), rebounding (6.1) and blocks (1.0). In his injury-shortened senior season, he averaged 14.0 points and 5.4 rebounds per game.

== Professional career ==
=== Texas Legends (2019–2020) ===
Copeland went undrafted in the 2019 NBA draft but later signed with the Texas Legends as a local tryout. He was subsequently reunited with Husker teammate Isaiah Roby, who was sent to the Legends on assignment from the Dallas Mavericks.

On August 5, 2020, Copeland signed with Lavrio of the Greek Basket League. However, due to an injury, he was not able to travel overseas and join the Greek club.

=== Obras Sanitarias (2022–2023) ===
In the 2022–23 season, Copeland played for the Argentine club Obras Sanitarias. In the Basketball Champions League Americas, he averaged 6.8 points and 2.5 rebounds over six games.

== Career statistics ==
Legend
GP	Games played	GS	Games started	MPG	Minutes per game
FG%	Field goal percentage	3P%	3-point field goal percentage	FT%	Free throw percentage
RPG	Rebounds per game	APG	Assists per game	SPG	Steals per game
BPG	Blocks per game	PPG	Points per game	**Bold**	Career high

=== College ===
Year	Team	GP	GS	MPG	FG%	3P%	FT%	RPG	APG	SPG	BPG	PPG
2014–15	Georgetown	**33**	11	20.0	.451	**.389**	.809	3.8	.7	.2	.6	6.8
2015–16	Georgetown	**33**	**33**	**32.0**	.429	.272	.789	5.4	**2.0**	.8	.6	11.1
2016–17	Georgetown	7	5	19.6	.275	.000	**.842**	3.3	.9	.9	.0	5.4
2017–18	Nebraska	**33**	**33**	**30.7**	.472	.369	.702	**6.1**	1.2	.8	**1.0**	12.9
2018–19	Nebraska	20	20	**30.7**	**.525**	.352	.692	5.4	1.1	**1.1**	0.9	**14.0**
Career		126	102		.402	.326	.749	5.1	1.2	.7	.7	10.6
