= L. J. Peak =

American basketball player (born 1996)

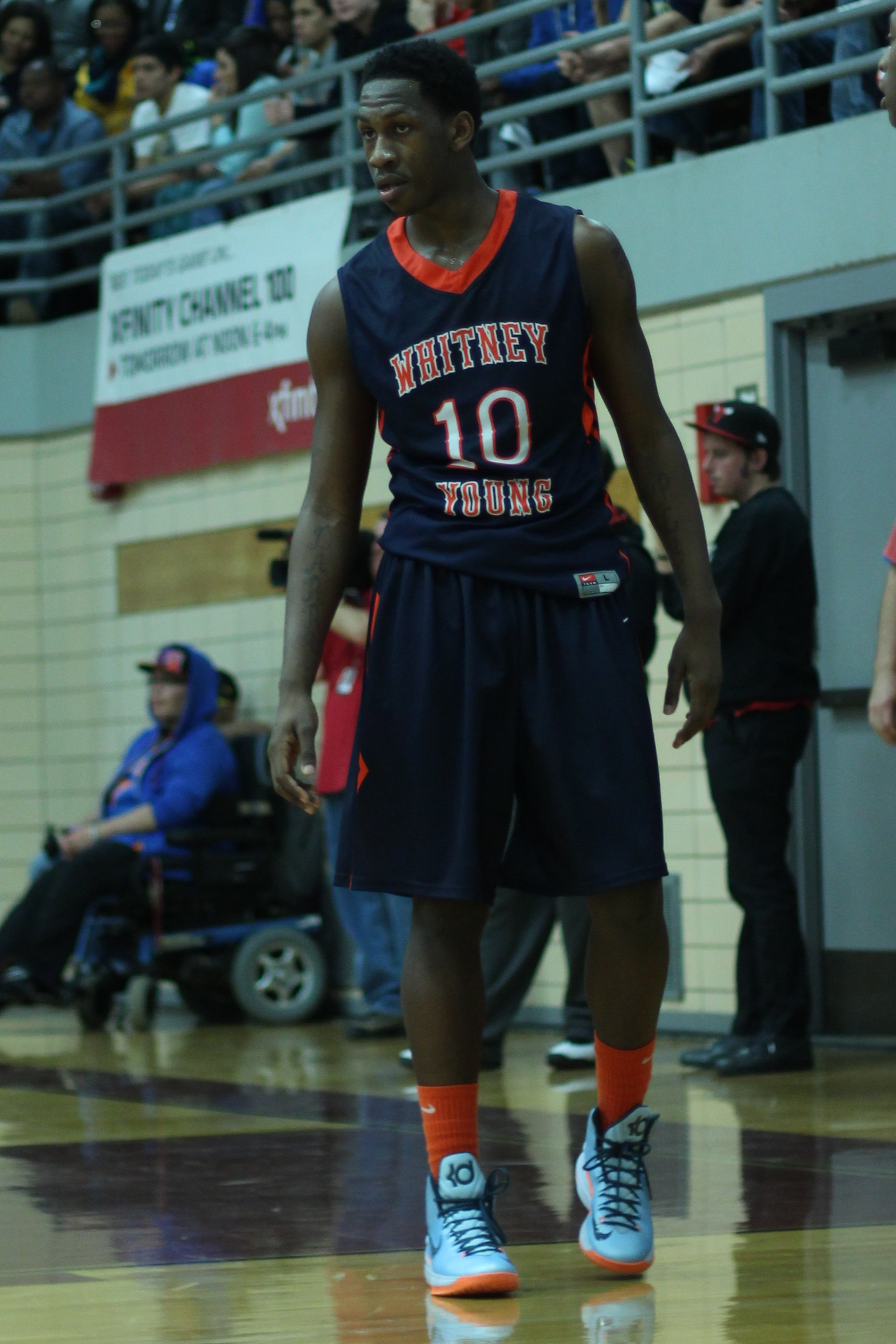
- Peak in 2013 for Whitney Young High School

No. 0 – Koshigaya Alphas
- Position: Small forward
- League: B.League

Personal information
- Born: February 2, 1996 (age 30) Gaffney, South Carolina, U.S.
- Listed height: 6 ft 5 in (1.96 m)
- Listed weight: 215 lb (98 kg)

Career information
- High school: Gaffney (Gaffney, South Carolina); Whitney Young (Chicago, Illinois)
- College: Georgetown (2014–2017)
- NBA draft: 2017: undrafted
- Playing career: 2017–present

Career history
- 2017–2018: Maine Red Claws
- 2018: Wellington Saints
- 2018–2019: Pistoia Basket 2000
- 2019–2020: Pallacanestro Varese
- 2020: U-BT Cluj-Napoca
- 2020–2021: Utsunomiya Brex
- 2021–2022: Kumamoto Volters
- 2022: Ibaraki Robots
- 2022: Nagasaki Velca
- 2022-2023: Yokohama Excellence
- 2023-Present: Koshigaya Alphas

Career highlights
- Big East All-Rookie team (2015); South Carolina Mr. Basketball (2014)
- Stats at Basketball Reference
Medals
Men's basketball
Representing the United States
FIBA U19 World Championship
Gold medal – first place	2015 Greece	National team

Darryl Leon "L. J." Peak Jr. (born February 2, 1996) is an American professional basketball player for Koshigaya Alphas of the B.League. He played college basketball for the Georgetown Hoyas. In high school, he won two South Carolina High School League (SCHSL) 4A state championships with Gaffney High School (2010 and 2012) as well as a 2013 Chicago Public High School League (CPL) championship with Whitney Young High School and was named South Carolina Mr. Basketball in 2014. At Georgetown, he was a 2015 Big East Conference All-Rookie team selection for the 2014–15 team and won a gold medal with USA Basketball at the 2015 FIBA Under-19 World Championship.

== High school career ==
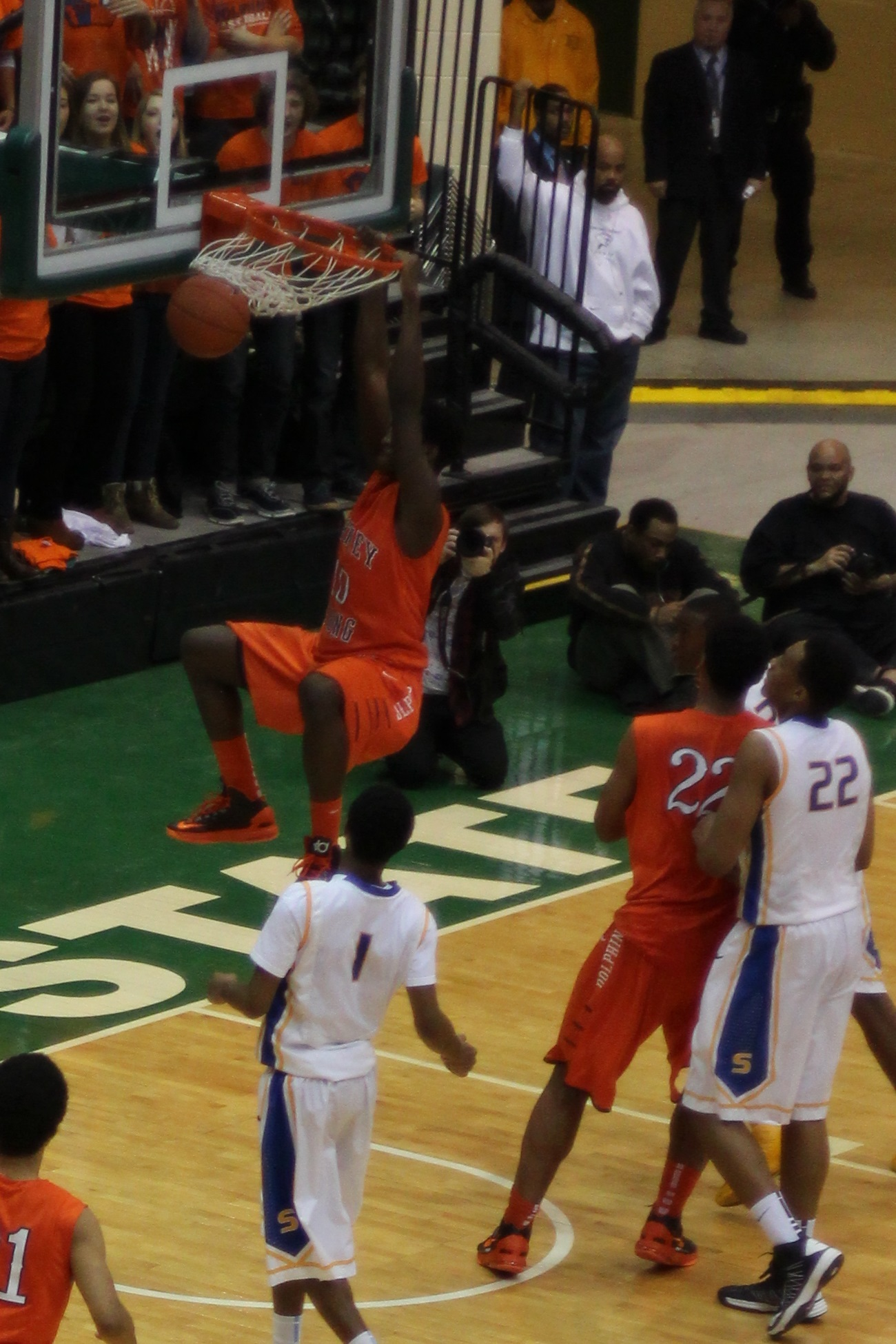
Peak dunking for Whitney Young

In 2010, Peak was a key member of the Gaffney team that went on to the SCHSL 4A state championship. As a sophomore in 2012, Peak scored 22 points, including 2 free throws with 7 seconds left in regulation, before fouling out to lead Gaffney in the 58–55 overtime victory over Lexington in the SCHSL 4A state championship. In the 2013 CPL playoffs February 15 finals contest Peak tallied 13 points in a 60–56 overtime Public League Championship game victory against Morgan Park High School by a Whitney Young team that also included Jahlil Okafor. He committed to Georgetown on July 2, 2013, choosing the Hoyas over offers from Florida State and South Carolina. At the time of his commitment, he was the 54th and 82nd ranked player in the Class of 2014, according to ESPN.com and Rivals.com, respectively. Peak closed out his high school career with a 49-point performance against Irmo High School in the third round of the SCHSL playoffs. Peak was named 2014 South Carolina Mr. Basketball.

College recruiting
Name	Hometown	School	Height	Weight	Commit date
L. J. Peak; F	Gaffney, SC	Gaffney (SC)	6 ft 5 in (1.96 m)	212 lb (96 kg)	Jul 2, 2013
L. J. Peak; F	Recruit ratings: Scout: Rivals: ESPN: (89)				
Overall recruit ranking: Scout: 62, 15 (SG) Rivals: 68 ESPN: 31, 1 (SC), 9 (SF)
Note: In many cases, Scout, Rivals, 247Sports, On3, and ESPN may conflict in their listings of height and weight.; In these cases, the average was taken. ESPN grades are on a 100-point scale.; Sources: "2014 Georgetown Signees". Rivals.; "2014 Georgetown Signees". Scout.; "2014 Georgetown Signees". ESPN.; "Scout.com Team Recruiting Rankings". Scout.; "2014 Team Ranking". Rivals.

== College career ==
On November 15, 2014, against St. Francis, Peak started and established the Georgetown record for most points (23) in a freshman debut when he hit all 9 of his field goals and posted the most points by a Georgetown freshman in a game during the John Thompson III era. The 9-for-9 shooting performance was the best performance of the season by a Big East Conference player. Peak developed a reputation for his defensive versatility as a freshman. Following the 2014–15 Big East season, he was selected to the Big East Conference All-Rookie Team.

On January 19, 2016, in an 81–72 upset of the #5-ranked Xavier Musketeers, Peak posted a 13-point, 10-rebound double-double off the bench. On March 6, Peak scored a career-high 31 points against #3-ranked (and eventual national champion) Villanova.

Peak entered his junior season as a 2016–17 preseason All-Big East honorable mention selection. He was a leader in many of Georgetown's wins that year. In a November 21 victory over #13/12 Oregon at the Maui Invitational Tournament, Peak scored 17 points including the free throws to seal the win with 2.7 seconds left. On January 25 against the #16/16 Creighton Bluejays, Peak contributed a game-high 20 points, giving him 1,000 in his Hoya career, in an upset. Three days later he posted a game-high 22 points in another upset over #11/11 Butler. Peak followed those performances up by scoring a game-high 26 points, including the final 5 points of the game in a January 31 76–73 win over DePaul.

Following the season, ESPN's Jeff Goodman reported on March 21, 2017, that Peak would declare himself eligible for the 2017 NBA draft. Peak had almost declared for the 2016 NBA draft and had a family to support at the time of his decision. The Georgetown basketball program was in a state of turmoil, with a top recruit leaving the program and head coach John Thompson III was fired two days later. On April 30, 2017, Jeff Goodman of ESPN reported that he was named as an alternate to the NBA Draft Combine.

== Professional career ==
=== Maine Red Claws (2017–2018) ===
On June 23, 2017, Peak was signed as an undrafted free agent by the Houston Rockets to a 2017 NBA Summer League contract. In late August 2017, ESPN's Adrian Wojnarowski tweeted that Peak had signed a two-way contract with the Boston Celtics. The Celtics officially announced their 20-man training camp roster on September 26, which included Peak. Peak was waived by the Celtics in the final week of training camp (on October 12). Later that month, Peak was designated as an affiliate player by the Maine Red Claws.

=== Wellington Saints (2018) ===
On April 20, 2018, Peak signed with the Wellington Saints for the 2018 New Zealand NBL season.

=== Pistoia Basket (2018–2019) ===
On July 28, 2018, Peak signed a one-year deal with the Italian club Pistoia Basket 2000 for the 2018–19 LBA season.

=== 2019–20 season ===
On June 7, 2019, he signed with Pallacanestro Varese but transferred in Romania to U-BT Cluj-Napoca at the end of January.

=== Japanese B.League (2020–) ===
On June 30, 2020, Peak signed with Utsunomiya Brex of the Japanese B.League.

On June 16, 2021, Peak signed with Kumamoto Volters.

On June 3, 2022, Peak signed with Ibaraki Robots.

On November 25, 2022, Peak signed with Nagasaki Velca.

On December 26, 2022, Peak signed with Yokohama Excellence.

On June 30, 2023, Peak signed with Koshigaya Alphas.

== International career ==
On June 18, 2015, Peak was announced as a member of the 12-man 2015 USA Basketball Men's U19 World Championship Team for the 2015 FIBA Under-19 World Championship. The team won the gold medal against Croatia.

== Personal life ==
Born in Gaffney, South Carolina, he is the son of Darryl Peaks Sr. and Lynette Peaks and has one brother, Jermaine Adams.
