= Trey Mourning =

American basketball player

Personal information
- Born: August 21, 1996 (age 30) Miami, Florida
- Listed height: 6 ft 9 in (2.06 m)
- Listed weight: 220 lb (100 kg)

Career information
- High school: Ransom Everglades (Coconut Grove, Florida)
- College: Georgetown (2014–2019)
- NBA draft: 2019: undrafted
- Playing career: 2019–2022
- Position: Power forward / center

Career history
- 2019–2020; 2021–2022: Sioux Falls Skyforce
- 2022: Nelson Giants
- Stats at Basketball Reference

Alonzo Harding "Trey" Mourning III (born August 21, 1996) is an American former professional basketball player He played college basketball for the Georgetown Hoyas.

== High school career ==
Mourning attended Ransom Everglades School where he was a five-year member of the varsity team and started his final three years. In his senior season, he became the team's captain and averaged 29 points and 10 rebounds while leading Ransom to Florida's Class 4A regional semifinals for the second consecutive year. That year, he set his school's single-game scoring record with 52 points, 22 rebounds and 12 blocks in a 94–65 victory against La Salle and was named a first team all-state selection as well as player of the year for Florida's Dade and Broward counties.

== College career ==
Just like his father, Mourning played college basketball for Georgetown. During his first three seasons, he came off the bench, missing his fourth year due to hip surgery. In his fifth year, his senior season, he became a part-time starter averaging 6.3 points and 3.8 rebounds in 26 games with 11 starts. Throughout his career, he averaged 3.2 points and two rebounds in 62 games.

== Professional career ==
=== Sioux Falls Skyforce (2019–2022) ===
After going undrafted in the 2019 NBA draft, Mourning joined the Miami Heat for the 2019 NBA Summer League. He was later selected second overall by the Sioux Falls Skyforce in the 2019 NBA G League draft. During the season, he played in 36 games and had one start, averaging 5.6 points, 2.9 rebounds and 0.4 assists in 12.6 minutes before the season was cancelled due to the COVID-19 pandemic.

On December 17, 2020, Mourning signed with the Houston Rockets, but was waived two days later. He did not play during the 2020–21 season.

Mourning returned to the Skyforce for the 2021–22 season and played 41 games, all from the bench, while averaging 5.5 points, 4.3 rebounds and 0.5 assists in 12.9 minutes.

=== Nelson Giants (2022) ===
On April 25, 2022, Mourning signed with the Nelson Giants for the 2022 New Zealand NBL season.

== Personal life ==
Mourning is the son of Hall of Fame center Alonzo Mourning. He has a brother, Alijah, and a sister, Myka.
