= Georgia State Route 324 =

Highway in Georgia, United States

State Route 324
- Gravel Springs Road NE, Auburn Road, Hills Shop Road
- Georgia State Route 324 highlighted in red

Route information
- Maintained by GDOT
- Length: 9.6 mi (15.4 km)

Major junctions
- West end: SR 20 in Buford
- I-85 near Buford; SR 124 in Hog Mountain
- East end: US 29 Bus. / SR 8 in Auburn

Location
- Country: United States
- State: Georgia
- Counties: Gwinnett, Barrow

Highway system
- Georgia State Highway System; Interstate; US; State; Special
← SR 323	→ SR 325

State Route 324 (SR 324) is a 9.6-mile-long (15.4 km) west-to-east state highway located in portions of Gwinnett and Barrow counties in the northeastern part of the U.S. state of Georgia. It connects Buford and Auburn. It also has an interchange with Interstate 85 (I-85). Before it was renamed, Carl Bethlehem Road was once part of SR 324.

== Route description ==
SR 324 begins at an intersection with SR 20 (Buford Drive NE) in the southeast part of Buford, in Gwinnett County. The route travels to the east-southeast and crosses over Ivy Creek. It curves to the southeast and has an interchange with, Interstate 85 (I-85). SR 324 continues to the southeast, crossing over Little Ivy Creek and intersects SR 124 (Braselton Highway) north of Dacula. The highway passes Fort Daniel Elementary School. Northeast of the Trophy Club at Apalachee Farms golf course, the highway curves to the northeast for just over 2,000 feet (610 m), and then curves back to the southeast. At the intersection with the northern terminus of Apalachee Road, which travels along the Gwinnett–Barrow county line, SR 324 enters Barrow County. It passes Old Peachtree Montessori School. Just before crossing over some CSX railroad lines, it enters Auburn. Almost immediately, it meets its eastern terminus, an intersection with US 29 Bus./SR 8 (Atlanta Highway).

SR 324 is not part of the National Highway System, a system of roadways important to the nation's economy, defense, and mobility.

== History ==
Previously, US 29 Bus./SR 8/SR 324 traveled concurrently through Auburn to Carl. It followed Carl–Bethlehem Road southeast to an intersection with US 29/SR 316 (University Parkway) in Whistleville and, later, SR 81 (Loganville Highway) northwest of Bethlehem. At this point, SR 324 turned to the east, intersecting SR 11 (Christmas Avenue) in Bethlehem. It followed East Star Street and Smith Mill Roadfinally turned to the northeast until it met its former eastern terminus, an intersection with SR 53 (Hog Mountain Road) southwest of Statham.

== Major intersections ==
County	Location	mi	km	Destinations	Notes
Gwinnett	Buford	0.0	0.0	SR 20 (Buford Drive NE) – Cumming, Lawrenceville	Western terminus; roadway continues as Financial Center Way.
Gwinnett		2.5	4.0	I-85 (SR 403) – Greenville, Atlanta	I-85 exit 118; opened November 23, 2021
Gwinnett		3.8	6.1	SR 124 (Braselton Highway) – Lawrenceville, Braselton	
Barrow	Auburn	9.6	15.4	US 29 Bus. / SR 8 (Atlanta Highway)	Eastern terminus
1.000 mi = 1.609 km; 1.000 km = 0.621 mi
