= 2024 Apalachee High School shooting =

Mass shooting in Georgia, U.S.

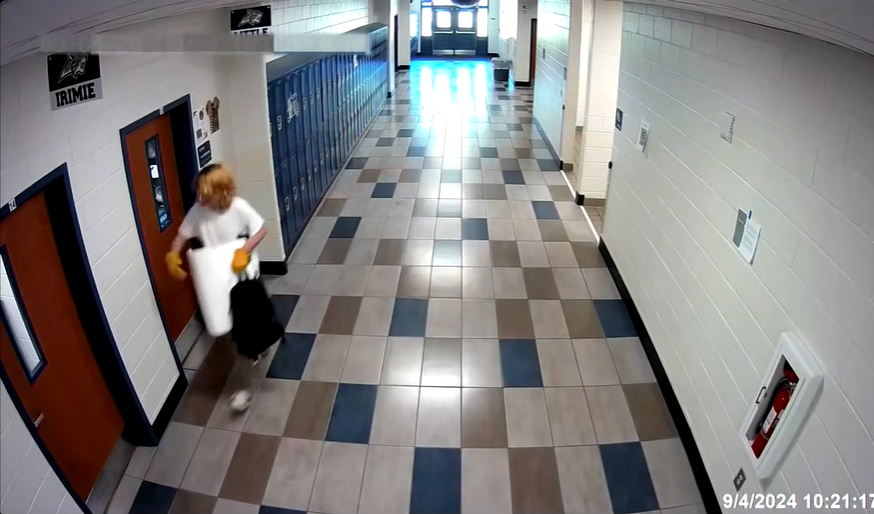
- Colt Gray prior to opening fire, carrying a rifle concealed behind a posterboard while peering into a classroom window.
- Location: 33°56′54″N 83°47′9″W; Apalachee High School; Barrow County, Georgia, U.S.
- Date: September 4, 2024 c. 10:20 – 10:26 a.m. (EDT)
- Attack type: Mass shooting; school shooting; mass murder
- Weapon: SIG Sauer M400 semi-automatic rifle
- Deaths: 4
- Injuries: 9 (7 directly by gunfire, 2 indirectly)
- Perpetrator: Colt Gray
- Motive: Desire for notoriety within the True Crime Community; Parkland high school shooting copycat crime
- Verdict: Colt: Pleaded guilty Colin: Guilty on all counts
- Convictions: Colt: 55 counts (Note: Malice murder (4 counts); Felony murder (20 counts); Aggravated assault (25 counts); Aggravated battery (2 counts); First-degree cruelty to children (4 counts)); Colin: 29 counts (Note: Second-degree murder (2 counts); Involuntary manslaughter (4 counts); Second-degree cruelty to children (18 counts); Reckless conduct (5 counts))
- Sentence: Colt: Life imprisonment without the possibility of parole plus 20 years Colin: 15 years in prison
- Convicted: Colt Gray; Colin Gray

On September 4, 2024, a school shooting occurred at Apalachee High School near Winder, Georgia, United States. The perpetrator, 14-year-old Colt Gray, killed four people—two students and two teachers—and injured nine others; seven by gunfire, and two indirectly. It is the deadliest school shooting in Georgia’s history.

Colt grew up with violent parents and suffered child abuse and neglect. He interacted with multiple Georgia child welfare workers, four school systems, three county sheriff's departments, and two local police agencies, with many of them ignoring or not responding to reported child abuse. He was motivated by a desire for notoriety and his obsession with Nikolas Cruz, the perpetrator of the Parkland high school shooting. He was a member of the True Crime Community and was subject to a previous police investigation in May 2023. Colt's father, Colin Gray, bought a rifle for his son despite his knowledge of the previous police investigation regarding alleged school shooting threats made by him, as well as his own history of mental health crises.

Colt Gray was taken into police custody and charged with four counts of felony murder. On March 3, 2026, Colin was convicted of second-degree murder and involuntary manslaughter in relation to the shooting and was sentenced to 15 years in prison. On July 24, 2026, Colt pleaded guilty to all of the charges and was sentenced to life in prison without parole.

== Background ==
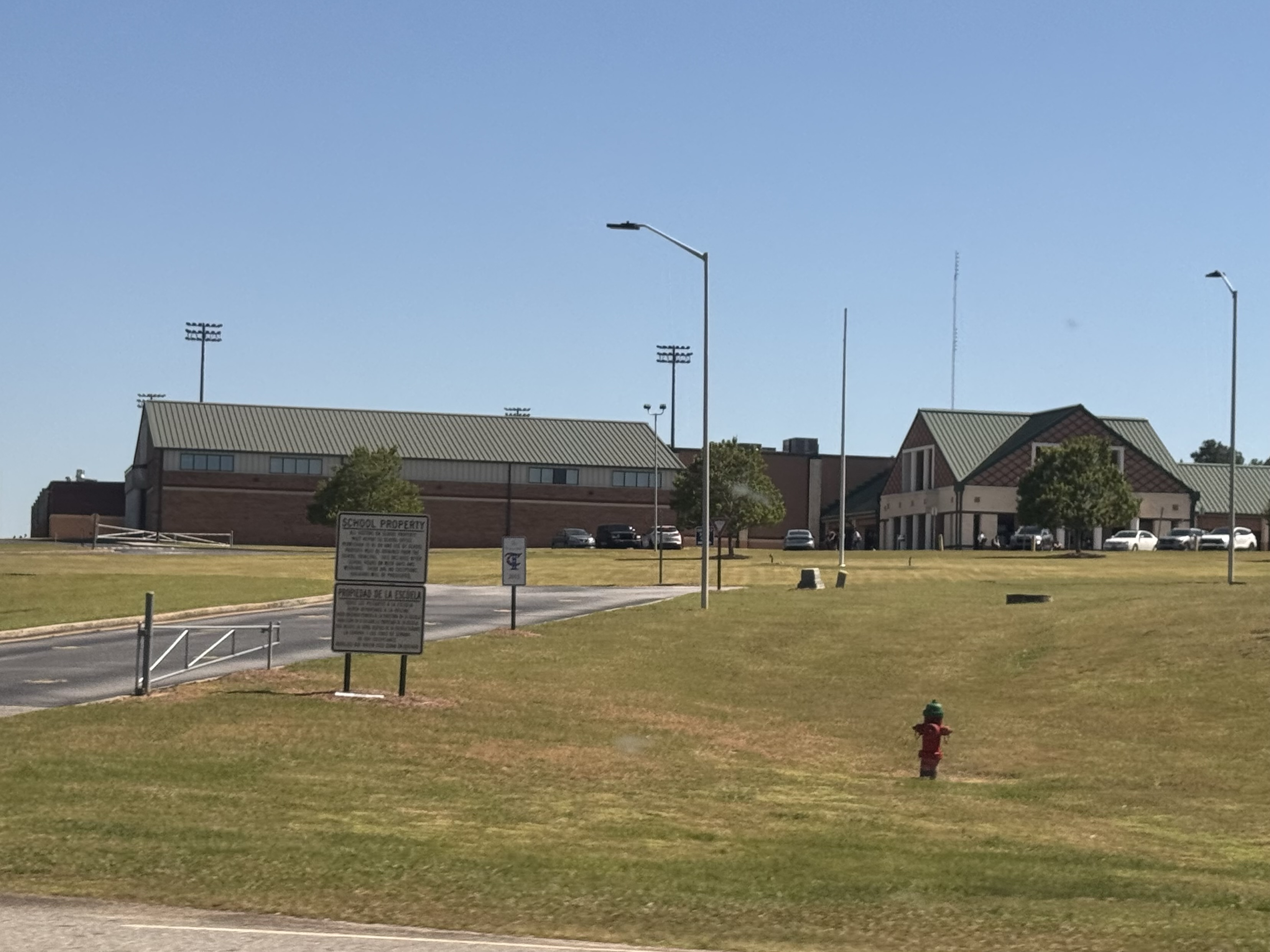
Apalachee High School in 2025

Apalachee High School is a public high school located in Barrow County, Georgia, about 50 miles (80 km) northeast of Atlanta. It is part of the Barrow County School District and had around 1,900 students enrolled at the time. All schools in the state of Georgia are legally required to complete at least one active shooter drill annually by October 1.

Georgia has some of the least restrictive gun laws in the United States. The sale of semi-automatic rifles is legal in the state. A background check is required for purchase from a licensed dealer. Georgia also has no child access prevention law or red flag law. However, carrying a firearm into a government building or school is illegal under state law.

Roughly one week before the shooting, teachers at the school were issued a form of identification with a panic button that can be pressed during any "active situation". Classroom doors at the school also lock automatically once shut and require opening from the inside if someone entering does not have a key.

== Shooting ==
On the morning of the shooting, a call was made to Apalachee High School threatening to target five schools, of which Apalachee would be the first. The source of the threat was never determined.

During his first period class, Colt Gray asked his teacher how the school would respond to an active shooter. The teacher additionally noticed his backpack was "unusually heavy". The teacher reported these concerns to administrators and other school staff via email. Gray's second period algebra teacher, in whose class the shooting would later begin, was not informed about the email from his first period teacher.

At 9:42 a.m., Colt Gray texted his father Colin Gray, "I'm sorry, it's not ur fault ... ur not to blame for any of it. [sic]". Upon receiving Colt's texts, Colin called Colt's maternal grandmother, who was with Colt's mother at the time.

Sometime after the second period algebra began at 9:45 a.m., Colt Gray left the classroom after requesting and obtaining a pass to see the school counselor. Around that same time, a different student in the class with the surname Gray and a similar first name also asked for permission to leave. Both Colt and the similarly-named student headed towards the same bathroom. Colt Gray left a notebook behind when he exited the classroom, which was recovered after the shooting.

At 9:50 a.m., Colt's mother called the school, warning of an "extreme emergency", and urged the school counselor to check in on her son. The school counselor told her that Colt had talked about a school shooting that morning.

School resource officers, alerted to Colt Gray's comments during his first period class, began looking for him. They found the bathroom Colt was hiding in, but incorrectly escorted the similarly-named student to the front office instead. While Colt continued to hide in one of the bathroom stalls, school staff continued to search for him for twenty minutes.

Colt Gray exited the bathroom wearing yellow gloves, carrying a backpack and holding a white posterboard around his torso. A rolled-up poster, poster tube, or posterboard was used by Colt Gray that morning to conceal his rifle, which he carried in his backpack.

At 10:02 a.m., Colt Gray texted his mother, "I'm sorry". At 10:18 am, she texted Colin Gray, suggesting he leave work and saying: "They're going to need you at the school".

Gray knocked on the door to his algebra classroom, presumably to reenter, and a student got up to open it. Before the student opened the door, she looked at its glass panel, through which she saw Gray holding a gun. She moved out of the way from the door and did not open it. When asked to open the door, she told the teacher "he has a gun". The shooter then entered a nearby classroom and fired between 10 and 15 rounds inside for seven seconds, striking multiple people and killing student Christian Angulo. The shooter then ran off, firing down the hall at those exiting rooms or bathrooms, but did not attempt to enter any classrooms with closed doors.

Shortly after the initial shots were fired, multiple staff members pushed the panic buttons on their identification, which triggered a lockdown and alerted authorities, including three school resource officers, regarding the shooting. The school was placed in lockdown at around 10:20 a.m. The lockdown software caused all interactive whiteboards in the school to flash the words "Hard Lockdown" in large red letters. The ambiguous wording of this message made some students think it was part of a drill.

A class of health students barricaded their classroom's doors with chairs and desks after seeing the "Hard Lockdown" message. A geometry teacher in a separate classroom flipped their desk over to barricade its door. Other students began hiding in their classrooms.

A junior at the school stated that his chemistry teacher attempted to investigate the ongoing situation, before being directed to lock the classroom door by another teacher warning of an active shooter. After the chemistry teacher locked the door, his students ran to the back of the room. An unknown person then began to knock on the door and shouted to "open up". Once the knocking stopped, gunshots and screams were heard.

Math teacher and assistant football coach Richard Aspinwall exited his classroom and went into the hallway to investigate a commotion and was shot in the chest. Aspinwall's students pulled him back into the classroom and used their shirts to stanch his bleeding, while also closing and barricading the door. He did not survive his injuries.

The director of the Georgia Bureau of Investigation stated that the local sheriff's office received calls about an active shooter at the school around the same time as the lockdown began. The school resource officers engaged Gray within minutes, and he ultimately surrendered to them. Gray had brought 103 bullets with him into the school, 36 of which were discharged during the shooting.

Students were evacuated from the school building to an outdoor football field after no further threat was found. Students later recounted seeing abandoned book bags, phones, and shoes on the floor during the evacuation, while others recounted seeing police attempting to block a body on the ground, a gun, and blood. Georgia's Governor Brian Kemp directed all available state resources to assist at the scene of the shooting.

== Victims ==
Four people were killed: students Mason Schermerhorn and Christian Angulo, both aged 14; math teacher Cristina Irimie, 53; and math teacher and assistant football coach Richard Aspinwall, 39. One teacher and eight students were injured in the shooting, seven of which suffered gunshot wounds. The injured were treated at Piedmont Athens Regional Hospital in Athens and Grady Memorial Hospital in Atlanta. Several patients were also admitted to hospitals due to panic attacks.

== Perpetrator ==
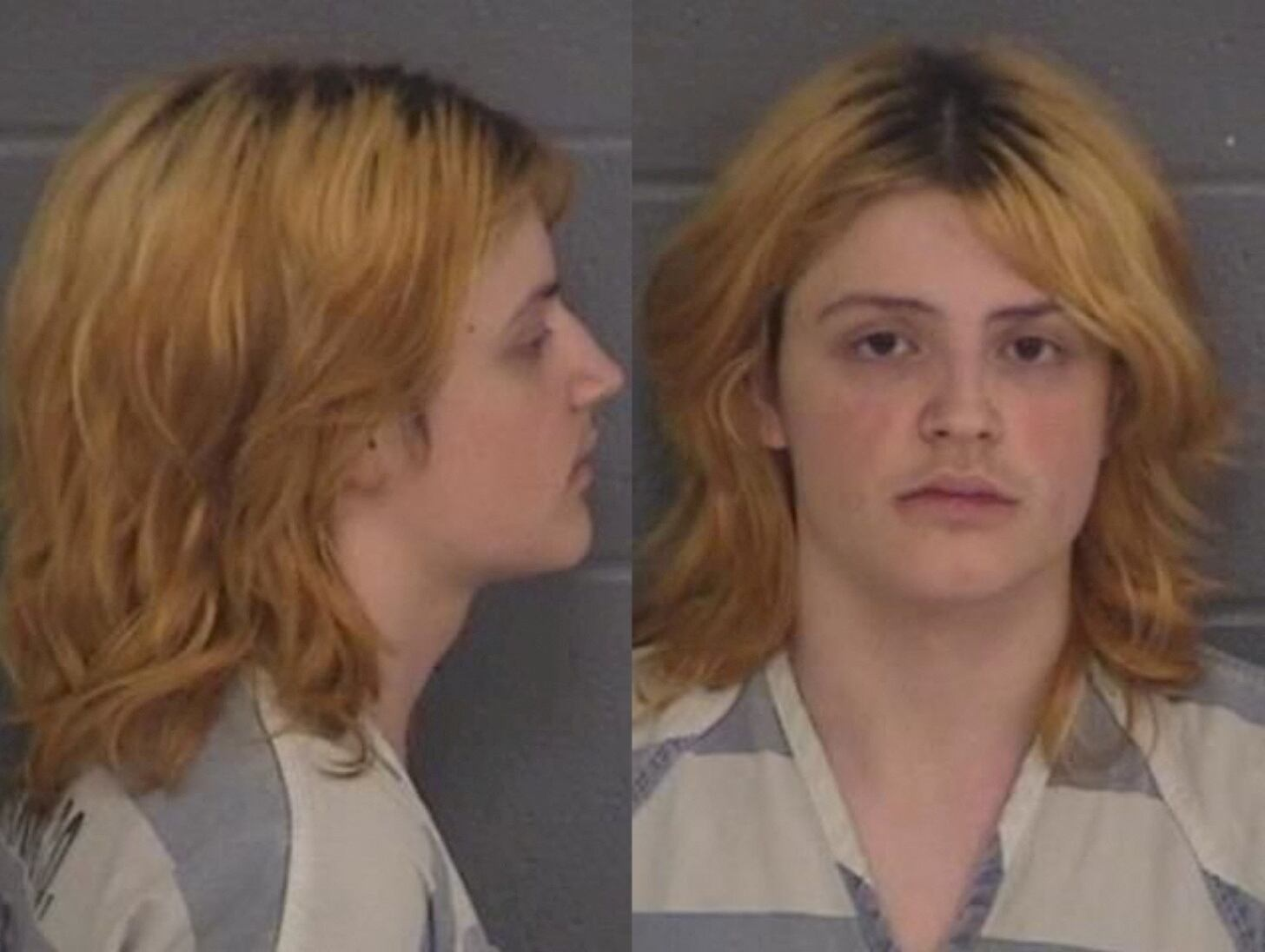
Police booking photos of Colt Gray taken the day after the shooting

Colt Gray was the perpetrator of the shooting. He was arrested and charged with four counts of felony murder. Prosecutors tried Gray as an adult. He used a semi-automatic AR-15 style rifle in the shooting.

Following the shooting, the perpetrator's father, Colin Gray (born August 10, 1970) was charged and later convicted of second-degree murder and involuntary manslaughter. A jury determined that Colin's decision to provide his son Colt with an AR-15-style rifle constituted criminal negligence and felony child cruelty, as he did so despite a police investigation into Colt for school shooting threats and Colt's documented mental health history. The verdict is considered a significant legal precedent for parental accountability, as it successfully utilized a state's second-degree murder statute to link a parent's underlying "criminal negligence" in child-rearing directly to the deaths of third parties.

=== Prior investigations and concerns of violence ===
In May 2023, anonymous tips were received by the Federal Bureau of Investigation (FBI)'s National Threat Operations Center concerning an account on the instant messaging service Discord. The person behind the account sent messages stating their intent to commit a school shooting, as well as a photo of a rifle and shotgun. The username of the Discord account was "Ланца", a Russian transliteration of "Lanza", the surname of the perpetrator of the Sandy Hook Elementary School shooting. Discord banned the account on May 21, 2023, and forwarded relevant information on it to law enforcement.

The FBI traced the account's email to Colt Gray, then aged 13, and the location of the messages was traced to the state of Georgia. The FBI contacted the Jackson County sheriff's office, who sent a deputy and a patrolman to the Gray family home, then located in Jefferson.

When questioned, Colt Gray denied making any such threats. The deputy told Gray he had to take him at his word. Colt also stated during the investigation that he deleted his Discord account multiple months prior, claiming it was consistently being hacked. Neither Colt, nor his father, Colin Gray, recognized the email address that the FBI had traced to Colt.

Colin Gray acknowledged that he owned unloaded guns and provided his son access to them, but also said that Colt's access to the guns was not "unfettered".

The sheriff's deputy who responded to the house had not seen screenshots of the messages or images of the guns. The relevant evidence was stored in an email attachment that the deputy did not know how to open on his phone.

The deputy later expressed confusion to Colin Gray over the tip and ultimately closed the case. The Jackson County sheriff's office told the FBI they would alert area schools about the case and monitor Colt's behavior, but after the shooting, no evidence was found suggesting such a notification had been sent.

In a statement issued after the shooting, the FBI said, "At the time, there was no probable cause for an arrest or to take any additional law enforcement action on the local, state or federal levels."

In late August 2024, Gray mentioned Nikolas Cruz, the perpetrator of the Marjory Stoneman Douglas High School shooting, to his maternal grandmother. She did not know who Cruz was; Gray then explained the shooting to her. Gray would also reference other school shootings, including the Sandy Hook Elementary School shooting and the Columbine High School massacre, in conversations with his mother.

Gray also had "a shrine of sorts" in his room, which included numerous pictures of, and newspaper clippings about, various school shooters on the wall behind his computer, including pictures of Cruz.

=== Abuse and home environment ===
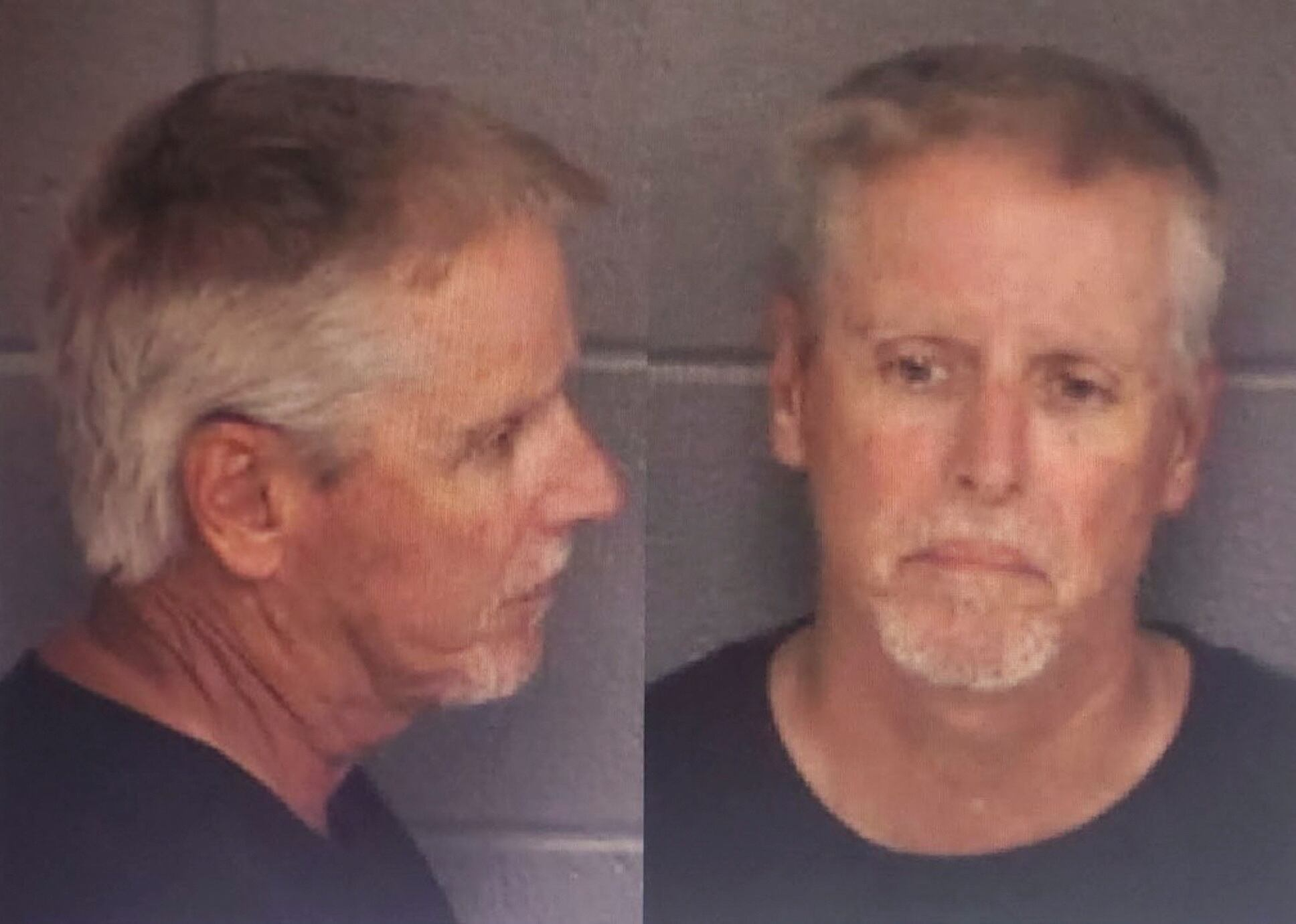
Police booking photos of Colt's father, Colin, taken the day after the shooting

According to Gray's lawyers, his household was at one point visited by the Georgia Department of Family and Children Services. According to The Washington Post, for the three years before the shooting, Gray and his family interacted with multiple Georgia child welfare workers, four school systems, three county sheriff's departments, and two local police agencies, with many of them ignoring or not responding to reported child abuse Gray was allegedly experiencing at the hands of his parents.

In August 2021, Gray allegedly searched the internet for ideas on how to murder his father, with the search being flagged since it was made from a school device. Two school resource officers showed up at Gray's home to talk with him and his mother. The Ben Hill County School District, where the incident occurred, said that they could not find an incident report of the event. Gray's maternal grandfather told CNN that Gray's father had multiple episodes where he attempted or purposely beat Gray, adding that Gray did not show any outward anger issues but was affected by his upbringing.

In September 2021, Gray's maternal grandmother reported her daughter to the Georgia Division of Family and Children Services after an incident in which her daughter had allegedly struck Gray six times. At the agency's request, Gray moved in with his paternal grandmother, and his mother began regular drug testing. Gray's maternal aunt offered additional evidence to the assigned caseworker, out of a fear that the incident was not being properly investigated, but was not taken up on that offer. The Fitzgerald Police Department was never contacted about the allegations against Gray's mother, as was required under state law.

On October 31, 2022, Gray was hit by his mother and, along with his sister, forced out of the house. They were let back in by Gray's mother around 11 p.m. A neighbor who witnessed the incident called the Jackson County office of Georgia's child welfare agency to report the incident.

In the fall of 2023, Gray moved back in with his mother in Fitzgerald. By her own admission, around the same time she began using methamphetamine. After Gray's mother failed a random drug test, Gray and his siblings were remanded to their father in Bethlehem, Georgia, the neighboring town south of Winder. On November 3, 2023, Gray's mother taped Gray's grandmother to a chair, telling her that she was going to drive to their home in Bethlehem, where she would kill both Colin and Colt. This remark was not reported to the police.

Gray's mother was arrested after being found by local police officers in a Walmart parking lot on Atlanta Highway Northwest in Winder, with her car covered in what she described as suicide notes, and wishes to see two of her children, but not Colt. She was sentenced to time served at the Barrow County Jail in December 2023 for a family violence offense. She remained in custody on a false imprisonment charge that, as of October 2024, was still pending.

Gray did not attend a single day of school during the 2023–24 school year, despite being registered at a local middle school. Under Georgia law, the school district was required to intervene in cases of long-term truancy, but it was unclear if this happened in Gray's case. Despite not completing a single day of eighth grade, Gray began ninth grade at Apalachee High School.

In December 2023, Colin Gray gave Colt Gray a SIG Sauer SIGM400 rifle as a Christmas present, which was later used in the shooting.

Colt Gray's maternal grandmother was concerned about his mental health leading up to the shooting. She noted that Colt refused to attend classes at Apalachee High because he believed his teachers were talking about him, and he had also told her of homicidal and suicidal thoughts.

Eight days before the shooting, she contacted a crisis center in Winder seeking to have Colt admitted, but was told that parental permission was required to do so. The next day, she met with Colt's school counselor about her concerns. She did not mention the guns at his father's house, nor was she asked about them.

After the meeting, she suffered an injury that required surgery and prevented her from ensuring that Colt would be admitted to the crisis center by Colin the next day. She asked Colin to admit him on Saturday, a day when he would not be working. Colt saw admission to the crisis center as his last opportunity for help, but Colin did not admit his son. The day before the shooting, Colt skipped school and told his grandmother he would go to the crisis center the next day.

Colt's mother also told investigators after the shooting that he had been recently experiencing frequent panic attacks.

== Investigations ==
U.S. Attorney General Merrick Garland said the Federal Bureau of Investigation and Bureau of Alcohol, Tobacco, Firearms and Explosives were on the scene. The FBI's Atlanta office confirmed that its agents were on scene. The Georgia Bureau of Investigation was also involved in the investigation.

== Legal proceedings ==
In early September 2024, both Gray and his father appeared at the Barrow Superior Court in separate court hearings to be read the charges against them. Gray was charged as an adult with 55 charges, including four counts of felony murder. If convicted, he faced a maximum penalty of life imprisonment without parole. Due to his underage status at the time of the crime, he was ineligible for the death penalty. Colin Gray faced 27 charges, including two counts of involuntary manslaughter, two counts of second degree murder and eight counts of cruelty to children.

In February 2026, Colin Gray's trial began with prosecutors detailing over 1,000 crime scene photos, scans, videos and walkthroughs of the scene. On March 3, 2026, Colin Gray was found guilty of all charges brought against him: second-degree murder in the deaths of students Mason Schermerhorn and Christian Angulo, involuntary manslaughter in the killings of teachers Richard Aspinwall and Cristina Irimie, 18 counts of cruelty to children, and five counts of reckless conduct. Colin Gray's sentencing hearing occurred on July 28 and 29, 2026. He originally faced up to 180 years in prison.

On July 24, 2026, Colt pleaded guilty in the shooting. On July 28, 2026, Colt was sentenced to life in prison without the possibility of parole on each count of malice murder. Judge Nicholas Primm stated that Colt is not "wracked by guilt" and that he is proud of himself, adding that Colt chose to "relish following in the footsteps of the murderers he idolized." Colt will remain in juvenile detention until he turns 17, at which point he will be transferred to the Georgia Department of Corrections to serve his sentence.

On July 30, 2026, Colin Gray, after having been convicted on all 29 counts, was sentenced to 15 years in prison.

== Aftermath ==
On September 6, Winder hosted a memorial for the victims of the shooting with multiple politicians and about 1,000 people in attendance. A memorial was created outside the school with students, their parents and members of the community leaving items such as flowers, balloons and notes. The school's high school football team was scheduled to play at another area school on September 6, but the game was canceled and a prayer vigil was scheduled in its place.

GoFundMe campaigns were started for the victims of the shootings to help cover costs associated with the shooting. Other fundraisers and memorial services were set up shortly after the shooting by local organizations and restaurants.

On September 20, Georgia students staged a walkout and a moment of silence for victims of the shooting. Apalachee High School reopened on September 24.

In January 2025, Apalachee High School installed metal detectors. On February 4, 2025, Apalachee High School students protested at the Georgia State Capitol in support of a law which would establish penalties for storing firearms in a way easily accessible to minors.

== Response ==
=== Political reaction ===
The White House issued a statement confirming that President Joe Biden had been briefed by Liz Sherwood-Randall, the Homeland Security Advisor, on the shooting and that his administration would continue coordinating with federal, state, and local officials as they received more information. Vice President Kamala Harris thanked first responders and stated that it "doesn't have to be this way". Attorney General Merrick Garland expressed his devastation with regards to the shooting and to anyone affected by it. White House Press Secretary Karine Jean-Pierre commented on the shooting during the afternoon press briefing, discussing the concern for gun control in the form of universal background checks and other programs.

Governor of Georgia Brian Kemp tweeted his condolences and asked for all Georgians to join in praying for the safety of students in classrooms. Andre Dickens, the mayor of Atlanta, offered his thoughts and prayers to those affected as well as support to responding law enforcement. Georgia U.S. Representative Mike Collins, whose congressional district includes the school, issued a statement offering prayers for the victims and their families. Collins' response was met with criticism from gun control advocates, with some accusing Collins of endorsing gun violence, referencing a campaign ad in which he falsely claimed Donald Trump had won the 2020 election while holding and firing an assault rifle.

Marjorie Taylor Greene, another U.S. Representative from Georgia, also issued a statement on X offering support to the victims and their families. Like Collins, Greene had faced criticism for campaign ads involving guns, as well as promoting baseless statements about previous shootings, such as the 2018 Parkland high school shooting, which she falsely claimed was a false flag act to promote anti-gun laws.

Republican presidential nominee Donald Trump expressed his condolences via a post on Truth Social. He stated, "Our hearts are with the victims and loved ones of those affected by the tragic event in Winder, GA. These cherished children were taken from us far too soon by a sick and deranged monster." Republican vice-presidential nominee JD Vance said that school shootings are an unfortunate "fact of life", that schools are soft targets, and that security, and not gun control, is needed.

== See also ==
- Assault weapons legislation in the United States
- Federal Assault Weapons Ban
- Gun culture in the United States
- Child access prevention law
- Gun law in the United States
- Gun politics in the United States
- Gun violence in U.S. schools
- Law enforcement in the United States
- List of mass shootings in the United States in 2024
- List of school shootings in the United States (2000–present)
- List of school shootings in the United States by death toll
- List of rampage killers (school massacres)
- Oxford High School shooting (similar shooting where the shooter's parents were also charged in connection)
- Trångsund school shooting (occurred on the same day)
