= Kamar Baldwin =

American basketball player (born 1997)

- Baldwin in 2026

No. 44 – Maccabi Tel Aviv
- Position: Point guard
- League: Israeli Premier League; EuroLeague

Personal information
- Born: September 15, 1997 (age 29) Winder, Georgia, U.S.
- Listed height: 6 ft 1 in (1.85 m)
- Listed weight: 190 lb (86 kg)

Career information
- High school: Apalachee (Winder, Georgia)
- College: Butler (2016–2020)
- NBA draft: 2020: undrafted
- Playing career: 2020–present

Career history
- 2020–2021: Türk Telekom
- 2021–2022: Göttingen
- 2022–2023: Maine Celtics
- 2023–2024: Aquila Trento
- 2024–2025: Baskonia
- 2025–2026: Bayern Munich
- 2026–present: Maccabi Tel Aviv

Career highlights
- First-team All-Big East (2020); Second-team All-Big East (2019); Big East All-Freshman Team (2017)
- Stats at Basketball Reference

Kamar Malik Baldwin (born September 15, 1997) is an American-born naturalized Georgian professional basketball player for Maccabi Tel Aviv of the Israeli Premier League and the EuroLeague. He played college basketball for the Butler Bulldogs.

== Early life and high school career ==
Baldwin started playing basketball from age two. He also played football as a quarterback and ran track in middle school. Baldwin attended Apalachee High School in Winder, Georgia. As a junior, he averaged 27 points, 9.8 rebounds and 3.7 assists per game, led his team to the Sweet 16 round of the Class AAAAA state tournament and was named Region 8-AAAAA Player of the Year. In his senior season, Baldwin averaged 29.6 points, 10.8 rebounds and 4.5 assists per game. He repeated as Region 8-AAAAA Player of the Year and finished with 2,593 career points, the most in Barrow County history. Baldwin played for the Atlanta Celtics on the Amateur Athletic Union circuit. On August 6, 2015, he committed to playing college basketball for Butler. Baldwin was a consensus three-star recruit and was ranked 123rd in the 2016 class by Rivals.

== College career ==
On November 16, 2016, in his second career game, Baldwin made the game-winning shot in 70–68 win over Northwestern. He scored a freshman season-high 21 points and grabbed nine rebounds in an 83–78 victory over Xavier on January 14, 2017. As a freshman, Baldwin averaged 10.1 points, 3.7 rebounds and 1.7 steals per game and was unanimously named to the Big East All-Freshman Team. On December 27, 2017, he scored 31 points in a 91–89 double overtime win over Georgetown. On March 8, Baldwin scored a sophomore season-high 32 points in a 75–74 victory over Seton Hall at the Big East tournament quarterfinals. He was named to the Big East All-Tournament Team. As a sophomore, he averaged 15.7 points, 4.9 rebounds and 3.2 assists per game. On January 19, 2019, Baldwin scored a junior season-high 30 points and grabbed eight rebounds in an 80–71 win over St. John's. As a junior, he averaged 17 points, 4.9 rebounds, and 3.1 assists per game and was named to the Second Team All-Big East.

In his senior season, Baldwin was limited in the first two games with a rib cartilage injury. He scored 31 points in a 67–58 win over Ole Miss on December 3. On January 24, 2020, Baldwin scored 31 points including the last nine points in regulation and collected a season-high eight rebounds in a 89–85 overtime win over Marquette. He had 17 points and eight rebounds on February 5, and hit a three-pointer at the buzzer to defeat Villanova 79–76. Baldwin injured his ankle in the first half of a loss to Creighton on February 23. On March 7, Baldwin scored a career-high 36 points and hit the game-winning three-pointer with a second remaining in a 72–71 win over Xavier. At the conclusion of the regular season, Baldwin was selected to the First Team All-Big East. He shared the Big East Sportsmanship Award with Jagan Mosely of Georgetown and Emmitt Holt of Providence. As a senior, Baldwin averaged 16.2 points, 4.6 rebounds and 3.3 assists per game, leaving with the fourth-most points and the third-most steals in program history.

== Professional career ==
After going undrafted in the 2020 NBA draft, Baldwin signed his first professional contract with Türk Telekom of the Turkish Super League on August 13, 2020. During the 2020-21 season, he averaged 6.1 points and 2.6 rebounds per game.

On July 27, 2021, Baldwin signed with BG Göttingen of the Basketball Bundesliga (BBL). During the 2021-22 season, he averaged 19 points per game, finishing as the third-best scorer in the German BBL that year.

On October 24, 2022, Baldwin joined the Maine Celtics training camp roster. During the 2022-23 season, he averaged 13.2 points and 5.0 assists per game in 49 games played for the team. The following summer, Baldwin played on the Boston Celtics summer league team.

On July 22, 2023, Baldwin signed with Aquila Trento of the Lega Basket Serie A. During the 2023-24 season, he averaged 13.9 points per game in Lega Basket Serie A matches and 15.2 points per game in EuroCup matches.

On June 9, 2024, Baldwin signed with Baskonia of the Liga ACB. During the 2024-25 season, he averaged 9.8 points per game in Liga ACB matches and 7.1 points per game in EuroLeague matches.

On August 6, 2025, Baldwin signed with Bayern Munich of the BBL. In his first season at the club, he averaged 7.1 points per game in BBL matches and 6.7 points per game in EuroLeague matches. On November 10, 2026, he parted ways with Bayern Munich.

On the same day, Baldwin signed with Maccabi Tel Aviv of the Israeli Premier League and the EuroLeague until the end of the season.

== International career ==
In November 2024, Baldwin received Georgian citizenship and became eligible to play for the senior national team of the Georgian Basketball Federation. In his first matches with the team, Baldwin averaged 22.5 points, 6.5 rebounds, and 5.5 assists per game as Georgia defeated Finland twice in the EuroBasket 2025 qualifiers.

The next year, Baldwin represented the Georgian national team at EuroBasket 2025. In Georgia's opening match, Baldwin scored 12 points as the team defeated Spain, the defending champions of EuroBasket 2022. In the team's first match of the knockout rounds, he scored 24 points on 8-of-10 shooting from the field as Georgia upset France and reached the quarterfinals for the first time in team history, earning Baldwin player of the game recognition. In seven appearances at the tournament, Baldwin averaged 10.9 points and 4.0 assists per game.

== Career statistics ==
Legend
| GP | Games played | GS | Games started | MPG | Minutes per game |
| FG% | Field goal percentage | 3P% | 3-point field goal percentage | FT% | Free throw percentage |
| RPG | Rebounds per game | APG | Assists per game | SPG | Steals per game |
| BPG | Blocks per game | PPG | Points per game | **Bold** | Career high |

=== College ===
| Year | Team | GP | GS | MPG | FG% | 3P% | FT% | RPG | APG | SPG | BPG | PPG |
|---|---|---|---|---|---|---|---|---|---|---|---|---|
| 2016–17 | Butler | 34 | 24 | 26.9 | **.495** | **.372** | .756 | 3.7 | 1.5 | **1.7** | **.5** | 10.1 |
| 2017–18 | Butler | **35** | **35** | 34.0 | .442 | .331 | .775 | **4.9** | 3.2 | 1.5 | .4 | 15.7 |
| 2018–19 | Butler | 33 | 33 | **34.2** | .447 | .311 | **.850** | **4.9** | 3.1 | 1.5 | .3 | **17.0** |
| 2019–20 | Butler | 31 | 30 | 31.6 | .419 | .331 | **.850** | 4.6 | **3.3** | 1.1 | **.5** | 16.2 |
| Career | | 133 | 122 | 31.7 | .446 | .333 | .817 | 4.5 | 2.7 | 1.5 | .5 | 14.7 |
