= Death of William DaShawn Hamilton =

1998 child death under suspicious circumstances

- Undated photo of William DaShawn Hamilton

- Location of Dekalb County in Georgia
- Date: Death: c. December 1998; Discovery of body: February 26, 1999; 27 years ago
- Location: DeKalb County, Georgia, U.S. (discovery of body)
- Type: Death of a child
- Cause: Unknown
- Deaths: William DaShawn Hamilton, aged 6
- Convicted: Teresa Ann Bailey Black
- Charges: Felony murder (2 counts); First-degree cruelty to children (2 counts); Aggravated assault; Concealing the death of another person
- Verdict: Guilty of concealing the death of another person; Not guilty on remaining counts
- Convictions: Concealing the death of another person
- Sentence: 10 years in prison

On February 26, 1999, a cemetery worker in DeKalb County, Georgia discovered the skeleton of a male child in a wooded area near a church cemetery. The child remained unidentified until June 2022 when he was identified as 6-year-old William DaShawn Hamilton. His mother, Teresa Ann Bailey Black, was arrested and charged with murder, child cruelty, aggravated assault, and concealing his death.

In January 2024, Teresa Black was found guilty of concealing William's death, but not guilty of all other charges. She was sentenced to 10 years in prison, the maximum sentence allowed under Georgia law.

== Discovery of body ==
On February 26, 1999, a worker for the Clifton United Methodist Church cemetery in southern DeKalb County, Georgia noticed skeletal remains on the side of the woods in the cemetery. He immediately notified authorities and it was determined it was the remains of a young male child.

An autopsy of the victim considered the cause of death as undetermined due to the time span of which the remains were there. It was believed that he had died in the last few months of 1998. The victim's remains had traces of acetaminophen and diphenhydramine. He was not malnourished and his remains did not show signs of long-time abuse. There was not enough evidence to rule out either homicide nor natural causes. His age range was determined to be between 4 and 7 years old. His height was between 3 ft 10 in (1.17 m) to 4 ft 2 in (1.27 m) and he weighed between 40 and 60 pounds (18 and 27 kg). DNA was extracted.

The initial investigation focused heavily on the victim's clothing. He was wearing red jean pants, a pullover hoodie, and brown Timberland boots, which was initially believed to suggest that he did not come from a lower-class family. He was buried in Clifton Methodist Churchyard, the church near where he was found, in an unmarked grave.

== Investigation ==
=== Initial investigation ===
Due to guilt from the investigators for referring to the victim as a "Clifton John Doe", he was given the nickname "Dennis".

The victim did not match any missing person reports in the state. In October 1999, a woman called the coroner's office claiming her name was "Dawn Anderson" and that she knew the victim's identity. She stated that the victim's name was "Cabel Brown" before hanging up. Authorities traced the call to the Florida Institute of Technology, but were never able to locate the caller. Authorities believe she likely used a false name. There were no missing person reports in the state for a child named "Cabel Brown". It is believed that this was either a fake tip or the woman had mistaken the victim for another child.

The victim's DNA was investigated through genetic genealogy, but no leads produced.

=== "Ava" update ===
In February 2019, the National Center for Missing & Exploited Children (NCMEC) created a forensic reconstruction image of what the victim may have looked like, which ended up being a striking resemblance.

In May 2020, a woman known by the name of "Ava" came across the victim's 2019 reconstruction photo. She stated that when she saw it she "screamed" and immediately called the NCMEC and told them that the victim's name was William DaShawn Hamilton and that she had been friends with his mother, Teresa Ann Bailey Black in Charlotte, North Carolina. She stated that in December 1998, Black abruptly took William out of school and stated that the two were moving to Atlanta, Georgia to be with relatives. Ava stated, "William hugged me and I hugged him. We kept hugging. [Black] had to practically pry us apart to get him back in the car. That was it. That’s the last time I saw him." Black later returned to Charlotte without William and consistently changed her story as to why Hamilton was no longer with her. Ava said that she felt that Black wanted to "liv[e] a life like William never existed". Ava stated that since 1999 she had dedicated time almost every day researching what may have happened to William. Authorities took Ava's claims seriously, and went through further DNA testing and determined that the victim was in fact William DaShawn Hamilton.

=== Arrest of Teresa Black ===
On July 13, 2022, it was announced that the victim had been identified as William DaShawn Hamilton, and that his mother, Teresa Ann Bailey Black, had been arrested in connection with his death. She was charged with two counts of felony murder, two counts of first-degree cruelty to children, one count of aggravated assault, and one count of concealing the death of another person. The prosecution alleged that Black drugged William with acetominophen and diphenhydramine and then murdered him by striking him with an unknown object. Ava stated that she was good friends with Black and never thought she would be capable of murder, but that she was "distant and impatient" with William, and that "she wasn’t a loving mom".

==== Criminal background of Black ====
In May 1994, Teresa Black shot and killed 40-year-old Jimmy Lee Samuels. At the time, Black was a 17-year-old living with Samuels and his girlfriend, and it is not known whether William lived with his mother at the time. Samuels and his girlfriend allegedly were in a physical altercation, and Black killed Samuels by shooting him in the back. She was initially charged with murder, but was given a plea deal for voluntary manslaughter and was sentenced to one year in prison. She had been arrested for various other crimes before 2022, but all were non-violent offenses.

== Trial ==
Teresa Black went to trial in January 2024 for the murder of William DaShawn Hamilton. The prosecution alleged that Black murdered William by drugging and then striking him in the head with an unknown object, as evidenced by fractures in his skull. Her defense argued that the fractures could have been caused by animals while William's body was in the woods. Her defense stated, "You can all hate her for this. You can hate her for these lies. That is not what Teresa Black is on trial for." At the time, William and Black were homeless and Black had been working at an Atlanta strip club. Her defense stated that Black chose the cemetery to sleep one night because it was "safe", and that she had given William over-the-counter medicine after he had become ill and he died in his sleep. Her defense stated she left him there because she feared she would be blamed for his death.

The prosecution stated, "There were individuals who loved him, but there was one individual who failed him and she failed him miserably, and it was the one individual who was supposed to love him unconditionally. Instead, she discarded him as if he was trash." Black and William's family testified against her at trial, including William's father, William Harris Hamilton. He stated that the last time he saw William was when he first started elementary school, and that following the time of his death, Black sought child support. William's father and Black's family stated that any of them would have taken care of William if she could not.

Black was found not guilty of felony murder, first-degree child cruelty, and aggravated assault, but guilty of concealing the death of another person.

William's father stated emotionally to the judge at sentencing, "I just feel so bad that I never got to spend time with him like all these people coming in and out of the courtroom. I don't know what to say. Whatever you can give her, just give it to her." The judge sentenced Black to 10 years in prison, the maximum sentence allowed under Georgia law for concealing the death of another person. She stated that the atrociousness of the concealment of "leaving your child to rot" warranted a maximum sentence.

== See also ==
- Murder of Kenyatta Odom
- Murder of Emma Grace Cole
- Murder of Amore Wiggins
- List of solved missing person cases: 1990s
- List of unsolved deaths
