= Murder of Amore Wiggins =

Child murder in Opelika, Alabama, US

Amore Wiggins
- Born: Amore Joveah Wiggins; January 1, 2006; Norfolk, Virginia, U.S.
- Status: Identified on January 19, 2023; 10 years, 11 months, and 22 days after discovery
- Died: c. 2011 (aged 5)
- Cause of death: Homicide
- Body discovered: January 28, 2012; Opelika, Alabama, U.S.
- Resting place: Forest Lawn Cemetery
- Other name: Opelika Jane Doe
- Known for: Formerly unidentified murder victim
- Parents: Lamar Vickerstaff, Jr. (father); Sherry Wiggins (mother)

Murder of Amore Wiggins
- Location: Opelika, Alabama, U.S.
- Date: January 28, 2012; 14 years ago (discovery of remains)
- Attack type: Child murder
- Victim: Amore Joveah Wiggins
- Accused: Lamar Vickerstaff, Jr. Ruth Vickerstaff
- Charges: Lamar Vickerstaff; Felony murder Lamar and Ruth Vickerstaff; Failure to report a missing child

Amore Joveah Wiggins, formerly known as Opelika Jane Doe, (born January 1, 2006 – c. 2011) was a formerly unidentified murder victim whose skeletal remains were found in a trailer park in Opelika, Alabama. Her identity was not known until nearly 11 years later, in January 2023. Wiggins's father, Lamar Vickerstaff, was subsequently charged with felony murder and failure to report a missing child, while her step-mother, Ruth Vickerstaff, was charged with the latter. If convicted, Lamar would face up to life imprisonment without the possibility of parole or the death penalty, and Ruth would face up to 10 years in prison.

== Discovery ==
On January 28, 2012, a resident discovered a skull at Brook Haven Trailer Park, 1775 Hurst St. in Opelika, Alabama. Police searched the surrounding area and found more remains, including a pink long-sleeved shirt with heart buttons and ruffles, nearby on a creek bank. It is unknown if that shirt belonged to the victim.

== Investigation ==
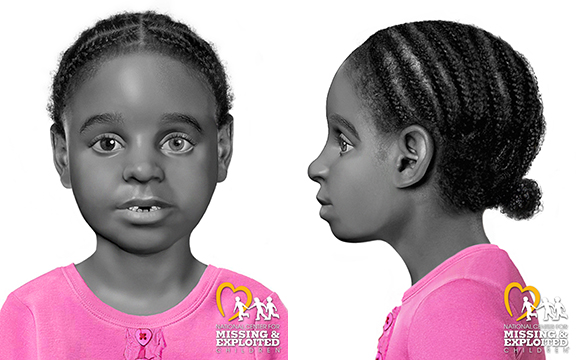
Forensic facial reconstruction of Wiggins while she was unidentified.

Detectives determined the skull belonged to a young African American girl, around 4–7 years of age. Evidence from her bones indicated she was malnourished, and she also had a visible deformity on her left eye, which could be natural or a result of injury or abuse. Forensic artists at the National Center for Missing & Exploited Children created an image of what Jane Doe may have looked like. Detectives looked at school and birth records, but this yielded no results. In 2017, the University of South Florida Institute for Forensic Anthropology & Applied Science performed isotope testing on her bones, which indicated she lived in Southeastern United States.

=== Vacation Bible School sighting ===
In September 2016, a former Vacation Bible school teacher at the Greater Peace Church in Opelika provided photos of a child who resembled Wiggins that were taken in the summer of 2011. She would have been 4–5 years old. The teacher said she had a slightly unkempt appearance and was not very clean. She had trouble communicating with other children and was quiet and stayed to herself. The teacher did not remember her name and the church did not formally register children so there were no records. The church was located 10 minutes from where Wiggins's remains were found.

Police used software to enhance the image, hoping someone in the public would recognize the girl.

=== Further investigation ===
The Opelika Police Department teamed up with Othram laboratories to use advanced DNA testing and investigative genetic genealogy.

Based on tips, detectives believed the unidentified child may have had ties to Orlando, Florida, southeastern Virginia or northeastern North Carolina.

== Identification ==
In January 2022, Opelika Jane Doe's remains were sent to Othram's laboratory in The Woodlands, Texas. A DNA extract from the remains was used to build a comprehensive genealogical profile, which was uploaded to a genealogical database. The Opelika Police Department retained Barbara Rae-Venter, known for helping police investigators identify the Golden State Killer, to produce investigative leads which were returned to Opelika Police Department.

In October 2022, Othram confirmed that Opelika Jane Doe had been identified as Amore Joveah Wiggins. 50-year-old Lamar Vickerstaff was identified as Amore's father in October 2022. He was born and raised in Opelika, Alabama, before he enlisted in the US Navy. He also spent time in Norfolk, Virginia, Honolulu, Hawaii, and Jacksonville, Florida.

In December 2022, Opelika detectives traveled to Mayport Naval Station in Jacksonville where Vickerstaff was stationed at the time to notify him of his daughter's death. Vickerstaff did not provide any information to authorities regarding his daughter's identity. Vickerstaff's wife, Ruth, to whom he had been married since May 2006, told detectives that she did not know who Vickerstaff's daughter was or who her mother had been.

Rae-Venter identified the biological mother to be Sherry Wiggins, who resided in Maryland. In December 2022, aged 37, she confirmed she was the biological mother of Amore. Sherry Wiggins was a native of Norfolk, and provided documentation showing that the Vickerstaffs obtained legal and physical custody of her daughter in 2009. At that time, Sherry's visitation with Amore was suspended. She also provided documents showing that she had continuously paid child support to Vickerstaff since 2009.

Amore Wiggins's funeral was held on February 25, 2023, in Norfolk, Virginia.

== Arrests of Lamar and Ruth Vickerstaff ==
On January 17, 2023, the Vickerstaffs were arrested in Jacksonville, Florida. Lamar Vickerstaff was charged with felony murder and failure to report a missing child, and his wife Ruth was charged with the latter. They were held at the Jacksonville Sheriff's Office until their extradition to Lee County, Alabama.

=== Alleged confession ===
On March 22, 2023, a preliminary hearing was held for Lamar and Ruth Vickerstaff's cases, where detective Alfred White revealed details about Lamar and Ruth Vickerstaff's interviews with police. White said that Ruth Vickerstaff had admitted to him that she had been untruthful during her initial arrest since she "didn't know what was going on". She stated that while she and Lamar had custody of Amore Wiggins, she became overwhelmed with having to take care of Amore and requested that Lamar "take Amore to his family" and stated that was the final time she saw Amore. White stated that someone who knew Ruth had reported Amore's injuries prior to her death.

White stated that during Lamar Vickerstaff's police interview, he had confessed to murdering Amore, but denied inflicting the injuries which had been observed on her remains and through the church surveillance footage. He stated that he had attempted to "bring [Amore] back to life" after the murder. He also requested to police that Ruth not be charged in Amore's death.

After the hearing, Lamar Vickerstaff was denied bail, while Ruth was granted bail and returned to Jacksonville; she is required to wear an ankle monitor while awaiting trial.

If convicted, Lamar Vickerstaff faces either life in prison without the possibility of parole or the death penalty, while Ruth Vickerstaff faces up to 10 years in prison.

As of July 2026, Lamar's murder trial is scheduled to begin on February 1, 2027.

== See also ==
- Death of William DaShawn Hamilton
- Killing of Kenyatta Odom
- List of solved missing person cases (post-2000)
- List of unsolved murders (2000–present)
- Murder of Emma Grace Cole, similar child murder case
