= Carl, Georgia =

- Town
- Logo

- Location in Barrow County and the state of Georgia
- Coordinates: 34°0′24″N 83°48′43″W
- Country: United States
- State: Georgia
- County: Barrow

Area
  - Total: 1.10 sq mi (2.84 km^{2})
  - Land: 1.08 sq mi (2.81 km^{2})
  - Water: 0.0077 sq mi (0.02 km^{2})
- Elevation: 1,079 ft (329 m)

Population (2020)
  - Total: 209
  - Density: 192.4/sq mi (74.27/km^{2})
- Time zone: UTC-5 (Eastern (EST))
  - Summer (DST): UTC-4 (EDT)
- FIPS code: 13-13184
- GNIS feature ID: 0354992
- Website: townofcarl.gov

Carl is a town in Barrow County, Georgia, United States. The Town population is 209 per the 2020 Census.

== History ==
The Georgia General Assembly incorporated the town in 1908 under the name "Lawson". The present name of "Carl" was named after the infant son of early settlers.

== Geography ==
Carl is located in western Barrow County at 34°0′24″N 83°48′43″W (34.006635, -83.812016). It is bordered on its west side by the city of Auburn.

According to the United States Census Bureau, the town has a total area of 1.1 square miles (2.8 km^{2}), all land.

== Demographics ==
Historical population
Census	Pop.	Note	%±
1910	166		—
1920	125		−24.7%
1930	112		−10.4%
1940	135		20.5%
1950	214		58.5%
1960	204		−4.7%
1970	234		14.7%
1980	239		2.1%
1990	263		10.0%
2000	205		−22.1%
2010	255		24.4%
2020	209		−18.0%
U.S. Decennial Census

As of the census of 2000, there were 205 people, 90 households, and 59 families residing in the town. The population density was 257.6 inhabitants per square mile (99.5/km^{2}). There were 99 housing units at an average density of 124.4 per square mile (48.0/km^{2}). The racial makeup of the town was 92.20% White, 2.93% African American, 4.39% from other races, and 0.49% from two or more races. Hispanic or Latino people of any race were 4.39% of the population.

There were 90 households, out of which 18.9% had children under the age of 18 living with them, 55.6% were married couples living together, 4.4% had a female householder with no husband present, and 34.4% were non-families. 30.0% of all households were made up of individuals, and 16.7% had someone living alone who was 65 years of age or older. The average household size was 2.28 and the average family size was 2.80.

In the town, the population was spread out, with 16.6% under the age of 18, 6.3% from 18 to 24, 29.8% from 25 to 44, 26.3% from 45 to 64, and 21.0% who were 65 years of age or older. The median age was 43 years. For every 100 females, there were 122.8 males. For every 100 females age 18 and over, there were 116.5 males.

The median income for a household in the town was $45,417, and the median income for a family was $56,250. Males had a median income of $32,356 versus $23,500 for females. The per capita income for the town was $20,948. About 1.5% of families and 6.1% of the population were below the poverty line, including 8.0% of those under the age of eighteen and 10.9% of those 65 or over.

== Education ==
The town is served by Barrow County Schools. Carl is divided between Auburn Elementary School and Kennedy Elementary School. Its zoned middle school and high school are Westside Middle School and Apalachee High School.
