= 2016–17 Butler Bulldogs men's basketball team =

American college basketball season

2016–17 Butler Bulldogs men's basketball

Las Vegas Invitational champions

NCAA tournament, Sweet Sixteen
- Conference: Big East Conference

Ranking
- Coaches: No. 19
- AP: No. 21
- Record: 25–9 (12–6 Big East)
- Head coach: Chris Holtmann (3rd season)
- Assistant coaches: Terry Johnson (10th season); Ryan Pedon (2nd season); Mike Schrage (1st season)
- Home arena: Hinkle Fieldhouse

2016–17 Big East men's basketball standings
	Conf.				Overall
Team	W		L	PCT	W		L	PCT
No. 1 Villanova †	15	–	3	.833	32	–	4	.889
No. 21 Butler	12	–	6	.667	25	–	9	.735
Creighton	10	–	8	.556	25	–	10	.714
Seton Hall	10	–	8	.556	21	–	12	.636
Providence	10	–	8	.556	20	–	13	.606
Marquette	10	–	8	.556	19	–	13	.594
Xavier	9	–	9	.500	24	–	14	.632
St. John's	7	–	11	.389	14	–	19	.424
Georgetown	5	–	13	.278	14	–	18	.438
DePaul	2	–	16	.111	9	–	23	.281
† 2017 Big East tournament winner Rankings from AP poll

The 2016–17 Butler Bulldogs men's basketball team represented Butler University in the 2016–17 NCAA Division I men's basketball season. Their head coach was Chris Holtmann, in his third year. The Bulldogs played their home games at Hinkle Fieldhouse and were members of the Big East Conference. They finished the regular season 25–9, 12–6 in Big East play to finish in second place. They lost to Xavier in the quarterfinals of the Big East tournament. The Bulldogs received an at-large bid to the NCAA tournament as a No. 4 seed in the South Region. They defeated Winthrop and Middle Tennessee to advance to the Sweet Sixteen. In the Sweet Sixteen, they lost to eventual National Champion North Carolina.

On June 9, 2017, head coach Chris Holtmann left to become the head coach at Ohio State. On June 12, the school hired Milwaukee head coach and Butler alum LaVall Jordan as head coach.

== Previous season ==
The Bulldogs finished the 2015–16 season with a record of 22–11, 10–8 in Big East play to finish in a tie for fourth place. They lost in the quarterfinals of the Big East tournament to Providence. The Bulldogs received an at-large bid to the NCAA tournament where they defeated Texas Tech in the first round to advance to the second round where they lost to Virginia.

== Off season ==
Prior to the season, Butler was picked to finish sixth in a poll of Big East coaches. Kelan Martin was named to the preseason All-Big East first team.

=== Departures ===
Name	Number	Pos.	Height	Weight	Year	Hometown	Notes
Kellen Dunham	24	G	6'6"	200	Senior	Pendleton, IN	Graduated
Austin Etherington	0	F	6'6"	220	RS Senior	Cicero, IN	Graduated
Jordan Gathers	5	G	6'3"	205	Senior	Woodland Hills, CA	Graduated
Roosevelt Jones	21	G/F	6'4"	225	RS Senior	O'Fallon, IL	Graduated
Jackson Davis	13	F	6'8"	233	Sophomore	Lexington, KY	Transferred to Eastern Kentucky

=== 2016 recruiting class ===
Butler originally signed four recruits in its 2016 class which was hailed as the best recruiting class in Butler history. However, three star point guard, Howard Washington, Jr., and Butler mutually agreed to part ways in April 2016. The class is currently ranked as 45th best in the country by 247Sports.com.

College recruiting
Name	Hometown	School	Height	Weight	Commit date
Joey Brunk; Center	Indianapolis, IN	Southport High School	6 ft 10 in (2.08 m)	240 lb (110 kg)	Jun 14, 2015
Joey Brunk; Center	Recruit ratings: Scout: Rivals: 247Sports: ESPN:				
Kamar Baldwin; Point guard	Winder, GA	Apalachee High School	6 ft 0 in (1.83 m)	175 lb (79 kg)	Aug 6, 2015
Kamar Baldwin; Point guard	Recruit ratings: Scout: Rivals: 247Sports: ESPN:				
Henry Baddley; Small forward	Akron, OH	St. Vincent–St. Mary High School	6 ft 6 in (1.98 m)	190 lb (86 kg)	Aug 6, 2015
Henry Baddley; Small forward	Recruit ratings: Scout: Rivals: 247Sports: ESPN:				
Overall recruit ranking:
Note: In many cases, Scout, Rivals, 247Sports, On3, and ESPN may conflict in their listings of height and weight.; In these cases, the average was taken. ESPN grades are on a 100-point scale.; Sources: "2016 Butler Commitments". Rivals.; "Butler Bulldogs Men's Basketball Recruiting 2016". Scout.; "Butler Bulldogs Men's Basketball Recruiting 2016". ESPN.; "Scout.com Team Recruiting Rankings". Scout.; "2016 Team Ranking". Rivals.

=== Incoming transfers ===
Name	Number	Pos.	Height	Weight	Year	Hometown	Notes
Avery Woodson	0	G	6'2"	190	Senior	Waynesboro, MS	Transferred from Memphis. Will be immediately eligible to play as he graduated from Memphis.
Paul Jorgensen	–	G	6'2"	185	Sophomore	New City, NY	Transferred from George Washington. Under NCAA transfer rules, Jorgensen will have to redshirt for the 2016–17 season. Will have two years of remaining eligibility.

== Roster ==
2016–17 Butler Bulldogs men's basketball team
Players
Coaches

Pos.	#	Name	Height	Weight	Year	Previous school	Hometown
G	25	Steven Bennett (W)	6 ft 3 in (1.91 m)	190 lb (86 kg)	Sr	New Castle	New Castle, IN
F	45	Andrew Chrabascz	6 ft 7 in (2.01 m)	230 lb (104 kg)	Sr	Cushing	Portsmouth, RI
F	30	Kelan Martin	6 ft 7 in (2.01 m)	220 lb (100 kg)	Jr	Ballard	Louisville, KY
F	4	Tyler Wideman	6 ft 8 in (2.03 m)	240 lb (109 kg)	Jr	Lake Central	Merrillville, IN
G	1	Tyler Lewis	5 ft 11 in (1.8 m)	170 lb (77 kg)	RS Sr	Oak Hill Academy (VA) (N.C. State)	Statesville, NC
G	10	Trey Pettus (W)	6 ft 4 in (1.93 m)	200 lb (91 kg)	Sr	MICDS	St. Louis, MO
C	51	Nate Fowler	6 ft 10 in (2.08 m)	240 lb (109 kg)	So	Archbishop Moeller	Cincinnati, OH
G	22	Sean McDermott	6 ft 6 in (1.98 m)	190 lb (86 kg)	RS Fr	Pendleton Heights	Pendleton, IN
G	11	Kethan Savage	6 ft 3 in (1.91 m)	205 lb (93 kg)	RS Sr	Episcopal (George Washington)	Alexandria, VA
G	3	Kamar Baldwin	6 ft 0 in (1.83 m)	170 lb (77 kg)	Fr	Apalachee	Winder, GA
G/F	20	Henry Baddley	6 ft 4 in (1.93 m)	175 lb (79 kg)	Fr	St. Vincent–St. Mary	Wadsworth, OH
G	0	Avery Woodson	6 ft 2 in (1.88 m)	190 lb (86 kg)	Sr	Wayne County (Memphis)	Waynesboro, MS
F/C	50	Joey Brunk (redshirt)	6 ft 11 in (2.11 m)	240 lb (109 kg)	Fr	Southport	Indianapolis, IN
G		Paul Jorgensen (redshirt)	6 ft 2 in (1.88 m)	185 lb (84 kg)	RS So	Don Bosco Prep (George Washington)	New City, NY

Head coach

- Chris Holtmann (Taylor)

Assistant coach(es)

- Terry Johnson (Purdue Fort Wayne)
- Ryan Pedon (Wooster)
- Mike Schrage (Indiana)

Legend

- (C) Team captain
- (S) Suspended
- (I) Ineligible
- (W) Walk-on
- Injured
- Current redshirt

Roster
Last update: June 16, 2016

== Schedule ==
Date time, TV	Rank^{#}	Opponent^{#}	Result	Record	High points	High rebounds	High assists	Site (attendance) city, state
Exhibition
Oct 29, 2016*; 2:00 p.m., WISH-TV		Wabash	W 100–53	–	17 – Martin	5 – Tied	6 – Lewis	Hinkle Fieldhouse (6,952); Indianapolis, IN
Nov 5, 2016*; 7:00 p.m., WISH-TV		Saginaw Valley State	W 77–50	–	15 – Martin	12 – Wideman	3 – Lewis	Hinkle Fieldhouse (9,100); Indianapolis, IN
Non-conference Regular Season
Nov 12, 2016*; 7:30 p.m., FS2		Northern Colorado	W 89–52	1–0	21 – Martin	6 – Martin	5 – Lewis	Hinkle Fieldhouse (7,836); Indianapolis, IN
Nov 16, 2016*; 7:00 p.m., FS1		Northwestern; Gavitt Tipoff Games	W 70–68	2–0	22 – Martin	7 – Chrabascz	3 – Baldwin	Hinkle Fieldhouse (7,858); Indianapolis, IN
Nov 19, 2016*; 1:00 p.m., FSN		Bucknell; Las Vegas Invitational	W 86–60	3–0	14 – Tied	6 – Martin	7 – Lewis	Hinkle Fieldhouse (7,236); Indianapolis, IN
Nov 21, 2016*; 8:30 p.m., FS1		Norfolk State; Las Vegas Invitational	W 91–55	4–0	17 – Fowler	7 – Fowler	8 – Lewis	Hinkle Fieldhouse (6,593); Indianapolis, IN
Nov 24, 2016*; 8:00 p.m., FS1		vs. Vanderbilt; Las Vegas Invitational semifinals	W 76–66	5–0	15 – Lewis	10 – Chrabascz	4 – Lewis	Orleans Arena (2,537); Paradise, NV
Nov 25, 2016*; 10:30 p.m., FS1		vs. No. 8 Arizona; Las Vegas Invitational championship	W 69–65	6–0	16 – Martin	8 – Wideman	6 – Lewis	Orleans Arena (3,000); Paradise, NV
Nov 28, 2016*; 9:00 p.m., P12N	No. 18	at Utah	W 68–59	7–0	18 – Martin	5 – Wideman	6 – Lewis	Huntsman Center (14,332); Salt Lake City, UT
Dec 3, 2016*; 4:00 p.m., FS2	No. 18	Central Arkansas	W 82–58	8–0	30 – Martin	10 – Wideman	6 – Savage	Hinkle Fieldhouse (7,117); Indianapolis, IN
Dec 7, 2016*; 7:00 p.m., ESPN3	No. 16	at Indiana State	L 71–72	8–1	18 – Chrabascz	7 – Chrabascz	7 – Lewis	Hulman Center (5,559); Terre Haute, IN
Dec 10, 2016*; 4:30 p.m., FS1	No. 16	No. 22 Cincinnati	W 75–65	9–1	20 – Martin	7 – Baldwin	5 – Chrabascz	Hinkle Fieldhouse (9,176); Indianapolis, IN
Dec 17, 2016*; 5:00 p.m., BTN	No. 18	vs. No. 9 Indiana; Crossroads Classic	W 83–78	10–1	28 – Martin	5 – Baldwin	6 – Lewis	Bankers Life Fieldhouse (18,684); Indianapolis, IN
Dec 21, 2016*; 7:00 p.m., FSN	No. 13	Vermont	W 81–69	11–1	28 – Chrabascz	8 – Martin	7 – Lewis	Hinkle Fieldhouse (7,898); Indianapolis, IN
Big East Conference Play
Dec 29, 2016; 7:00 p.m., FS1	No. 13	at St. John's	L 73–76	11–2 (0–1)	20 – Wideman	9 – Tied	4 – Chrabascz	Carnesecca Arena (5,602); Queens, NY
Jan 1, 2017; 3:00 p.m., CBSSN	No. 13	Providence	W 78–61	12–2 (1–1)	15 – Martin	8 – Martin	4 – Chrabascz	Hinkle Fieldhouse (8,403); Indianapolis, IN
Jan 4, 2017; 6:30 p.m., FS1	No. 18	No. 1 Villanova	W 66–58	13–2 (2–1)	13 – Tied	7 – Chrabascz	3 – Tied	Hinkle Fieldhouse (9,206); Indianapolis, IN
Jan 7, 2017; 12:10 p.m., FOX	No. 18	at Georgetown	W 85–76 ^{OT}	14–2 (3–1)	16 – Baldwin	10 – Martin	3 – Savage	Verizon Center (8,273); Washington, D.C.
Jan 11, 2017; 9:00 p.m., FS1	No. 12	at No. 8 Creighton	L 64–75	14–3 (3–2)	14 – Woodson	6 – Chrabascz	3 – Tied	CenturyLink Center Omaha (18,032); Omaha, NE
Jan 14, 2017; 2:00 p.m., FS1	No. 12	No. 15 Xavier	W 83–78	15–3 (4–2)	21 – Baldwin	9 – Baldwin	2 – Chrabascz	Hinkle Fieldhouse (9,166); Indianapolis, IN
Jan 16, 2017; Noon, FS1	No. 13	Marquette; MLK Day Marathon	W 88–80	16–3 (5–2)	22 – Martin	7 – Martin	3 – Tied	Hinkle Fieldhouse (9,100); Indianapolis, IN
Jan 21, 2017; 2:00 p.m., FS1	No. 13	at DePaul	W 70–69 ^{OT}	17–3 (6–2)	20 – Savage	8 – Wideman	2 – Tied	Allstate Arena (6,713); Rosemont, IL
Jan 25, 2017; 8:30 p.m., FS1	No. 11	at Seton Hall	W 61–54	18–3 (7–2)	16 – Chrabascz	11 – Martin	2 – Tied	Prudential Center (7,009); Newark, NJ
Jan 28, 2017; 8:10 p.m., CBSSN	No. 11	Georgetown	L 81–85	18–4 (7–3)	22 – Martin	4 – Tied	5 – Lewis	Hinkle Fieldhouse (9,116); Indianapolis, IN
Jan 31, 2017; 7:00 p.m., FS1	No. 16	No. 22 Creighton	L 67–76	18–5 (7–4)	14 – Baldwin	8 – Martin	4 – Chrabascz	Hinkle Fieldhouse (9,100); Indianapolis, IN
Feb 7, 2017; 9:00 p.m., CBSSN	No. 22	at Marquette	W 68–65	19–5 (8–4)	21 – Chrabascz	7 – Wideman	5 – Lewis	BMO Harris Bradley Center (12,423); Milwaukee, WI
Feb 11, 2017; 4:00 p.m., CBSSN	No. 22	at Providence	L 65–71	19–6 (8–5)	19 – Fowler	11 – Baldwin	4 – Chrabascz	Dunkin' Donuts Center (12,746); Providence, RI
Feb 15, 2017; 8:30 p.m., FS1	No. 24	St. John's	W 110–86	20–6 (9–5)	20 – Tied	10 – Wideman	9 – Lewis	Hinkle Fieldhouse (7,719); Indianapolis, IN
Feb 19, 2017; 1:30 p.m., FS1	No. 24	DePaul	W 82–66	21–6 (10–5)	15 – Fowler	8 – Martin	8 – Lewis	Hinkle Fieldhouse (9,100); Indianapolis, IN
Feb 22, 2017; 9:00 p.m., FS1	No. 22	at No. 2 Villanova	W 74–66	22–6 (11–5)	22 – Martin	8 – Martin	8 – Chrabascz	The Pavilion (6,500); Villanova, PA
Feb 26, 2017; 3:30 p.m., FS1	No. 22	at Xavier	W 88–79	23–6 (12–5)	25 – Martin	7 – Martin	6 – Chrabascz	Cintas Center (10,312); Cincinnati, OH
Mar 4, 2017; 2:30 p.m., FOX	No. 13	Seton Hall	L 64–70	23–7 (12–6)	19 – Martin	6 – Martin	5 – Chrabascz	Hinkle Fieldhouse (9,100); Indianapolis, IN
Big East tournament
Mar 9, 2017; 7:00 p.m., FS1	(2) No. 18	vs. (7) Xavier; Quarterfinals	L 57–62	23–8	15 – Martin	5 – Chrabascz	2 – Tied	Madison Square Garden (16,003); New York, NY
NCAA tournament
Mar 16, 2017*; 1:30 p.m., TNT	(4 S) No. 21	vs. (13 S) Winthrop; First Round	W 76–64	24–8	18 – Woodson	8 – Martin	8 – Lewis	BMO Harris Bradley Center (18,025); Milwaukee, WI
Mar 18, 2017*; 7:30 p.m., TBS	(4 S) No. 21	vs. (12 S) Middle Tennessee; Second Round	W 74–65	25–8	19 – Martin	6 – Tied	4 – Tied	BMO Harris Bradley Center (18,045); Milwaukee, WI
Mar 24, 2017*; 7:09 p.m., CBS	(4 S) No. 21	vs. (1 S) No. 5 North Carolina; Sweet Sixteen	L 80–92	25–9	21 – Chrabascz	7 – Chrabascz	4 – Chrabascz	FedEx Forum (16,397); Memphis, Tennessee
*Non-conference game. ^{#}Rankings from AP Poll. (#) Tournament seedings in parentheses. S=South Region. All times are in Eastern Time.

== Rankings ==
Ranking movements Legend: ██ Increase in ranking ██ Decrease in ranking RV = Received votes
	Week																			
Poll	Pre	1	2	3	4	5	6	7	8	9	10	11	12	13	14	15	16	17	18	Final
AP	RV	RV	RV	18	16	18	13	13	18	12	13	11	16	22	24	22	13	18	21	Not released
Coaches	RV	RV	RV	18	15	18	13	13	18	13	14	11	15	21	25	22	15	20	24	19

*AP does not release post-NCAA tournament rankings

== Awards ==
Name	Award(s)
Kamar Baldwin	Las Vegas Invitational All-Tournament Team; Big East Freshman of the Week – Dec. 12-18; Big East Freshman of the Week – Jan. 15-22; Big East All-Freshman Team
Andrew Chrabascz	Las Vegas Invitational Most Outstanding Player; All-Big East First Team
Kelan Martin	Preseason All-Big East First Team; Las Vegas Invitational All-Tournament Team; Lute Olson Award National Player of the Week; Big East Player of the Week – Dec. 12-18; Big East Player of the Week – Feb. 20-26; All-Big East Second Team
