= Murder of Kenyatta Odom =

Child murder in 1988

- Victim Kenyatta Odom
- Location: Murder: Near Albany, Georgia, U.S. Discovery of body: Millwood, Georgia, U.S.
- Date: December 21, 1988; 37 years ago (discovery of body)
- Attack type: Child murder, filicide
- Victims: Kenyatta Odom, aged 5
- Perpetrators: Evelyn Odom and Ulyster Sanders Sr.
- Motive: Resentment and ableism
- Verdict: Sanders: Pleaded guilty Evelyn Odom: Not guilty of aggravated battery, guilty on remaining counts
- Convictions: Evelyn Odom: Felony murder; First-degree child cruelty; Concealing the death of another person; Conspiracy to conceal the death of another person; Sanders: Concealing material facts, concealing the death of another person (Note: Charges of felony murder, first-degree child cruelty, conspiracy to conceal the death of another person, and aggravated battery were dropped in a plea deal.)
- Sentence: Evelyn: Life imprisonment with the possibility of parole after 30 years

Kenyatta "KeKe" Odom (August 28, 1983–1988), formerly known as Christmas Doe and Ware County Jane Doe, was a formerly unidentified murder victim whose decomposed remains were found in Millwood, Georgia on December 21, 1988. Her body was discovered inside a suitcase filled with cement that was placed inside of a television console and discarded on the side of a road. She was unidentified for 34 years until she was identified in November 2023.

Following Kenyatta Odom's identification, Evelyn Odom, her mother, and Ulyster Sanders, her mother's boyfriend at the time, were arrested and charged with murder, child cruelty, and covering up Kenyatta's death.

On August 8, 2025, Sanders pleaded guilty to concealment and agreed to testify against Evelyn Odom at her trial, which began on August 11, 2025. It was revealed that Evelyn had resented Kenyatta for having physical disabilities and urinary issues, and murdered her in a rage following an episode of Kenyatta soiling herself.

On August 27, 2025, Evelyn Odom was found guilty of felony murder, first degree cruelty to children, conspiracy to commit a crime, and concealing the death of another, but not guilty of aggravated battery. On February 6, 2026, Evelyn was sentenced to life in prison with the possibility of parole after 30 years.

== Discovery of body ==
On December 21, 1988, a truck driver who was driving in Millwood, Georgia spotted an old television console off Duncan Bridge Road. He pulled over to inspect the television console, and discovered inside a black suitcase sloppily sealed with cement. The trucker broke it open, and found a gym bag, with the decomposing body of a young black girl. After the find, the trucker went back to his truck and called police.

At the time, it was determined that the girl had been deceased for one to two months, that she was around the age of 3, that she was 2-foot-9, and that she weighed around 30 pounds. Her death was ruled as a homicide by undetermined means, with shooting and stabbing being ruled out. She was nicknamed "Christmas Doe" due to the date of the discovery being so close to the holiday.

== Investigation ==
Following the discovery of the girl's body, investigators interviewed locals door-to-door, but turned up no leads. Investigators searched databases across the country for a missing child matching the victim's description, but did not turn up any matches. In the 2010s and 2020s, authorities increasingly made pleas to the public for leads in the case.

In 2019, the Georgia Bureau of Investigation began to work with Othram, a genealogy company, in an attempt to identify the victim through genetic genealogy. They were able to determine that she was likely from the area of Albany, Georgia. After a 2022 news report for the anniversary of the discovery of the victim, a member of the public contacted the GBI, stating that she recognized the girl from when she was a child. The GBI investigated the lead, and determined that the tipster's intuitions were correct and that the victim was 5-year old Kenyatta Odom of Albany, Georgia.

=== 2023 arrests ===
Following the identification of Kenyatta, authorities believed that Evelyn Odom, Kenyatta's mother, and Ulyster Sanders, Evelyn's boyfriend at the time, were responsible for Kenyatta's death. On November 1, 2023, a Dougherty County grand jury indicted then-56-year-old Evelyn and then-61-year-old Sanders on the charges of the felony murder of Kenyatta, first-degree cruelty to children, aggravated battery, concealing the death of Kenyatta, and conspiring to conceal her death. They were arrested on November 9, 2023.

According to the indictment, Evelyn and Sanders submerged Kenyatta in hot water, seriously disfiguring her legs and feet, which caused her death. They then encased her body in concrete and put her in the large television console that was dumped in the woods. According to the tipster who led to the suspects' arrests, who was later identified as Evelyn's second cousin, she had been told as a child that the reason she no longer saw Kenyatta was because Kenyatta went to live with her father, but that she "never really believed that story." It was confirmed that Sanders is not Kenyatta's father. If convicted of the murder of Kenyatta, the suspects would face a mandatory sentence of life in prison.

=== Trial proceedings ===
On June 5, 2025, it was reported that a plea agreement was being offered to Ulyster Sanders, which the presiding judge in his case appeared reluctant to accept. Evelyn Odom's trial was scheduled for August 11, 2025.

On August 8, 2025, Sanders pleaded guilty to concealing material facts and concealing the death of another person. He was denied bond and agreed to testify against Evelyn Odom at her trial.

Evelyn Odom's trial began on August 11, 2025. The prosecution claimed in opening statements that Kenyatta was placed in scalding hot water by Evelyn as punishment for soiling herself. The prosecution alleged that Evelyn resented Kenyatta because Kenyatta's birth was the result of Evelyn being raped, and because Kenyatta had physical disabilities, often having difficulty walking. The prosecution stated that Sanders wanted to call emergency services for Kenyatta, but was discouraged by Evelyn. Kenyatta was then placed on a bed and died four to five days later. Evelyn and Sanders then concealed the body together.

On August 15, family members of both Evelyn and Sanders testified. Evelyn's second cousin, Theresa Ray, who was identified as the tipster who recognized Christmas Doe's sketch as Kenyatta, stated that, “After [Kenyatta] went missing, she had not been to any of the family functions." Family members testified that Kenyatta always appeared malnourished and quiet when they saw her. They stated that whenever they would ask where Kenyatta was following her disappearance, Evelyn and Sanders would fabricate stories that Kenyatta was in California or with a woman named "Madea."

On August 20, Sanders testified against Evelyn. He stated that Evelyn would physically abuse Kenyatta when she "had bathroom issues". He testified that in the days preceding her death, after Kenyatta had soiled herself, Evelyn ran hot water in a bath as punishment and forced Kenyatta to go in. He stated, "Kenyatta was hollering. She was screaming ... I saw the top part of her foot was blistered. The skin was hanging off her foot.” He stated that he wanted to call emergency services, but Evelyn urged him not to. Sanders stated that after Kenyatta died a few days later, he agreed to assist Evelyn with concealing Kenyatta's body and provided the concrete that her body was placed in.

On August 27, 2025, Evelyn Odom was found guilty of felony murder, first-degree cruelty to children, conspiracy to commit a crime, and concealing the death of another, but not guilty of aggravated battery. On February 6, 2026, Evelyn Odom was given the mandatory minimum sentence of life in prison with the possibility of parole after 30 years.

== See also ==
- List of solved missing person cases: 1950–1999
- Murder of Emma Grace Cole
- Murder of Amore Wiggins
- Death of William DaShawn Hamilton
