= East Central Georgia =

Coordinates: 34°0′N 83°20′W

- Region
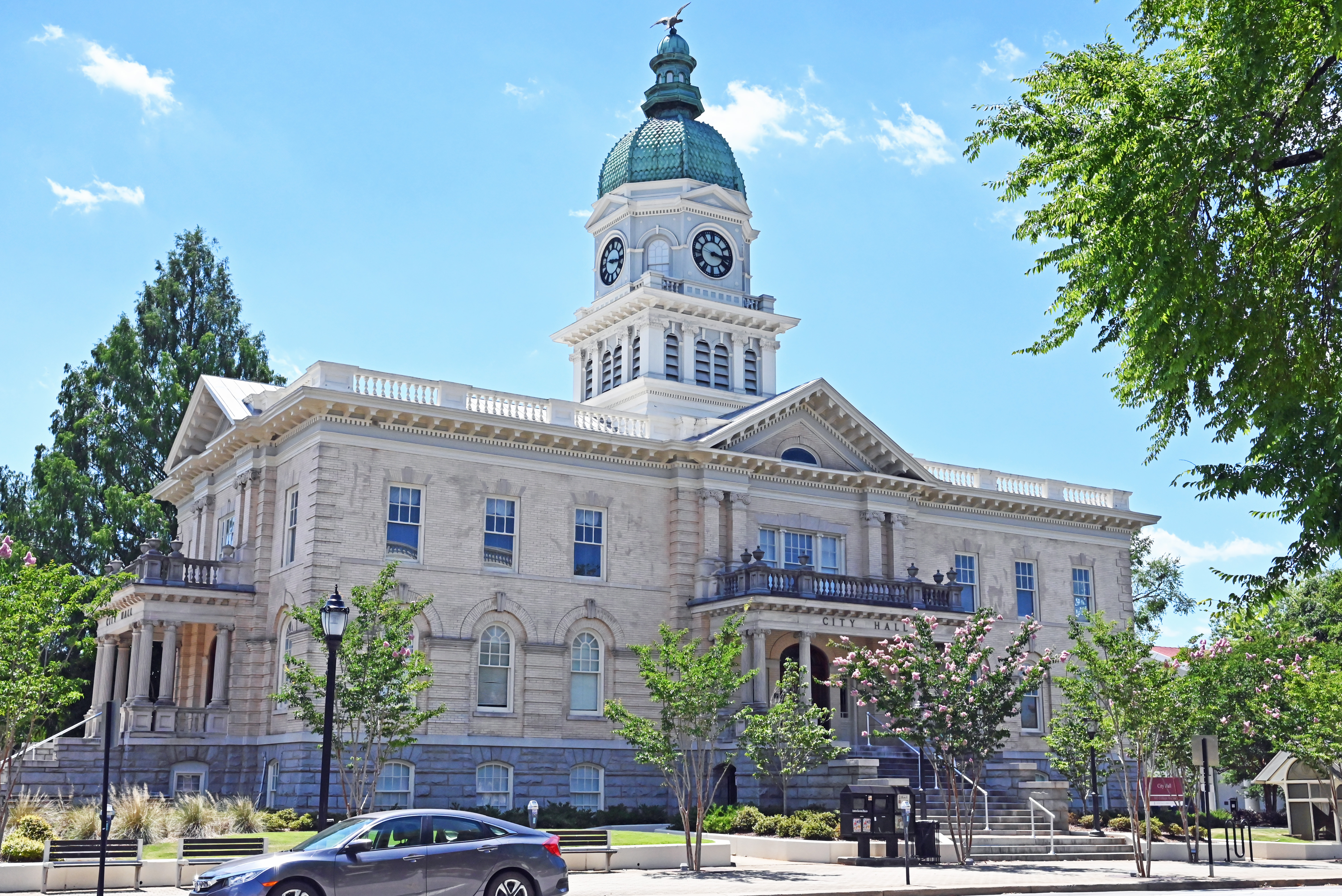
- Athens City Hall

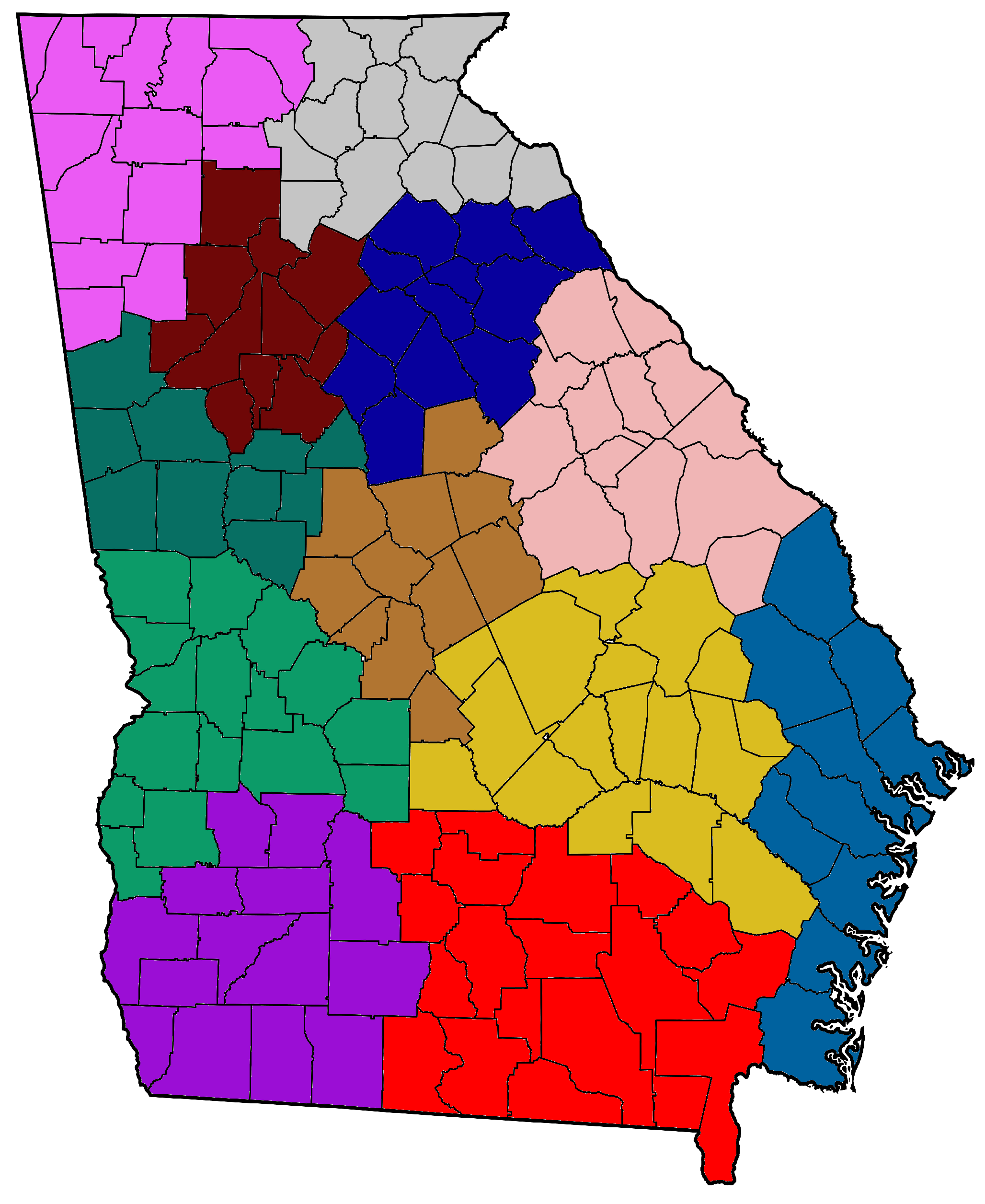
- East Central Georgia highlighted in indigo

- Location of Georgia within the United States
- Country: United States
- State: Georgia
- Largest city: Athens; Winder; Monroe; Covington; Loganville; Braselton; Jefferson; Auburn; Commerce

Population (2020)
  - Total: 643,390
- Demonym: East Central Georgian
- Website: www.georgia.org/regions/east-central-georgia

East Central Georgia is a 12-county region in the U.S. state of Georgia, with a 2020 census-tabulated population of 643,390. The region's largest city by population is Athens, forming the core of the Athens metropolitan area.

== Geography ==
East Central Georgia, bordering South Carolina, consists of these counties according to the Georgia Department of Economic Development: Barrow, Clarke, Elbert, Greene, Jackson, Jasper, Madison, Morgan, Newton, Oconee, Oglethorpe, and Walton. Forming a part of the Atlanta–Athens–Clarke–Sandy Springs combined statistical area, the largest city and metropolitan statistical area in the region is Athens.

== Demographics ==
According to the 2020 United States census, the counties forming East Central Georgia had a resident population of 643,390. The racial and ethnic makeup of the region's counties was predominantly non-Hispanic white and black or African American.

As a part of the predominantly evangelical Protestant Bible Belt, East Central Georgia's religious population is mostly Christian. In a 2020 study by the Association of Religion Data Archives, most of the area's Christian population by affiliation was Baptist, nondenominational, Catholic, or Methodist. The largest Christian denominations by membership were the Southern Baptist Convention, Catholic Church, United Methodist Church, Jehovah's Witnesses, the Church of Jesus Christ of Latter-day Saints, and the Christian churches and churches of Christ.

== Economy ==
According to the Georgia Department of Economic Development, education and filmmaking have been prominent industries throughout East Central Georgia. Among its educational institutions, the University of Georgia has contributed to an $8.1 billion economic impact statewide as of 2024. More than 20 films and television shows have been produced in the area.

== Transportation ==
=== Air ===
- Athens–Ben Epps Airport

=== Highways ===
- U.S. Route 29
- U.S. Route 78
- U.S. Route 129
- U.S. Route 441
