= Barrow Arts and Sciences Academy =

High school in Winder, Georgia

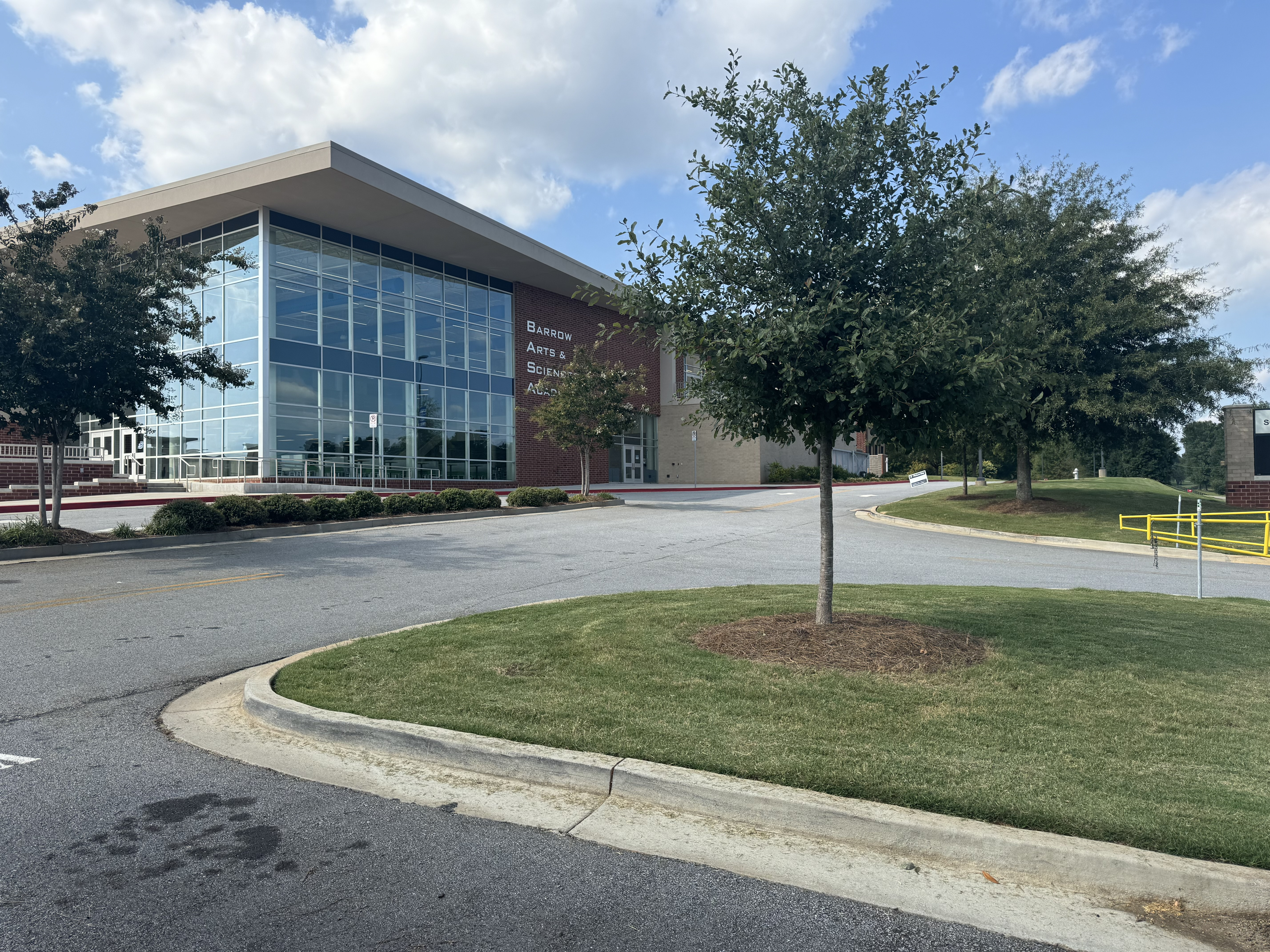
- BASA student building

Location
- 1007 Austin Road; Winder, Barrow County, Georgia 30680; United States
- 33°56′39″N 83°39′27″W

Information
- Other name: BASA
- Established: 2020
- School district: Barrow County Schools
- CEEB code: 110357
- Principal: Thomas Thrailkill
- Teaching staff: 58.10 (FTE)
- Grades: 9 – 12
- Enrollment: 943 (2023-2024)
- Student to teacher ratio: 16.23
- Campus type: Suburban
- Team name: Blazers
- Website: https://basa.barrow.k12.ga.us/

Barrow Arts and Sciences Academy, also known as BASA, is a STEM and arts-focused high school near Winder, Georgia, United States, serving grades 9–12.

It has an enrollment of 1,064 students. The school has the highest graduation rate in Barrow County, at 97.8%. Unlike traditional high schools, BASA runs on a lottery system that any high school student can enter regardless of their location in the county. The school is home to the BASA "Blazers."

During the COVID-19 pandemic, face masks were optional at the school. In 2023, the school announced they would no longer have a track team, sparking arguments with the school board.

== Campus ==
It is in an unincorporated area in Barrow County.

The BASA campus is home to an amphitheater called the "Innovation Amphitheater" that hosts events, both school related and not, often. The campus of BASA is connected to those of SIMS Academy and Lanier Technical College's Barrow campus.
