= Barrow Heights, Georgia =

Barrow Heights
- Unincorporated community
- Location within the state of Georgia
- Coordinates: 33°59′30″N 83°44′40″W
- Country: United States
- State: Georgia
- County: Barrow
- Elevation: 997 ft (304 m)
- Time zone: UTC-5 (Eastern (EST))
  - Summer (DST): UTC-4 (EDT)
- GNIS feature ID: 331099

Barrow Heights is an unincorporated community located in Barrow County, Georgia, United States.
