= Murder of Emma Grace Cole =

2019 child murder in Smyrna, Delaware

- Victim Emma Grace Cole
- Location: Smyrna, Delaware, U.S.
- Date: c. July – September 2019 (murder); September 13, 2019 (discovery of remains)
- Attack type: Child murder, torture murder, burning, starvation, filicide, child abuse, child neglect
- Victims: Emma Grace Cole, aged 3
- Perpetrators: Kristie Lynn Haas; Brandon L. Haas
- Motive: Unknown
- Verdict: Pleaded guilty
- Convictions: Kristie: First-degree murder by abuse or neglect; Abusing a corpse; Felony endangering the welfare of a child (3 counts) (Note: Dropped charges as part of Kristie's plea bargain: One additional count of first-degree murder by abuse or neglect; One count of second-degree assault; One count of reckless burning; One count of first-degree child abuse; Three misdemeanor counts of endangering the welfare of a child; One count of hindering prosecution); Brandon: Endangering the welfare of a child (4 counts) (Note: One felony count, three misdemeanor counts.) (Note: Dropped charges as part of Brandon's plea bargain: One count of first-degree child abuse; Two felony counts of endangering the welfare of a child; One count of hindering prosecution)
- Sentence: Kristie: 30 years in prison (Note: Plus a consecutive 20-year suspended sentence.); Brandon: 4 years and 1 month in prison (released after 3 years)

Emma Grace Cole (January 10, 2016 – c. July to September 2019) was an American murder and torture victim from Bloomington, Indiana, whose burnt skeletal remains were discovered near a softball complex in Smyrna, Delaware, on September 13, 2019. She remained unidentified for over a year, and was known as "Baby Elle", "Jane Smyrna Doe 2019", and "Smyrna Doe" until her identification in October 2020. The murder gained significant attention and media coverage due to the brutality of Emma's death and her former status as an unidentified murder victim.

In October 2020, following Emma's identification, her mother, 28-year old Kristie Haas, and step-father, 38-year old Brandon Haas, were arrested in connection with her death and were charged with first-degree child abuse. In May 2021, they were re-indicted, with Kristie then facing first-degree murder by abuse or neglect charges.

Brandon Haas agreed in February 2023 to a plea deal for a recommendation from the prosecution of a sentence of probation. On May 25, 2023, Kristie Haas agreed to a plea deal for a recommendation from the prosecution of 30 years in prison, and faced a maximum of life imprisonment without the possibility of parole.

In September 2023, Kristie Haas was sentenced to 30 years in prison, and Brandon was sentenced to 4 years and 1 month in prison. The sentences were met with outrage from Emma's family and the public over their perceived leniency.

== Murder ==
According to prosecutor Kevin Smith, following extensive torture, starvation, and physical abuse, Kristie Haas found her daughter, 3-year-old Emma Grace Cole unresponsive and tried to revive her with a cold shower. Kristie stopped her husband, Brandon Haas, from calling 911. Kristie later threw away Emma's clothing, stating, "That's it for Emma. Emma's not coming back." Kristie later lied to family members about why Emma was absent after the murder, telling them that Emma had "the devil in her eyes" and was in a facility for children with mental illness.

Kristie burned Emma's body and discarded her skeleton into the bushes of the softball field near the Smyrna Middle School. Following the murder, the couple fled to Indiana, and were later arrested in Pennsylvania.

== Discovery of remains and investigation ==
On September 13, 2019, the burnt skeletal remains of a female child were discovered by a dogwalker near a softball complex across from Smyrna Middle School in Smyrna, Delaware. It was estimated that her remains had been there for weeks at minimum. The identity of the remains could not initially be determined. It was estimated that the unidentified child was either Caucasian or Hispanic, between the ages of 2 and 5 years old, and had slightly wavy brown hair.

The case garnered major attention in media and public discourse because of the child's status as an unidentified person and for the initial lack of suspects in the case. The unidentified child was nicknamed "Baby Elle" by law enforcement and the public until her identification. She did not match any missing person reports in the state.

=== Identification and arrests ===
In October 2020, the child was identified as Emma Grace Cole, the 3-year-old daughter of Kristie Lynn Haas (previously Kristie Lynn Cole) and Joshua Douthitt. Soon after, on October 12, Kristie and her husband were arrested in Pennsylvania on charges of child abuse.

== Legal proceedings ==
Kristie and Brandon Haas were extradited to Delaware, and in May 2021, Kristie and Brandon were re-indicted, with Delaware Attorney General Kathy Jennings announcing that murder charges had been added for Kristie.

Specific details of the abuse that Emma had endured at the hands of Kristie and Brandon were revealed. According to the indictment, Emma was tortured by Kristie and Brandon for periods between January 2018 and September 2019. The indictment revealed that the couple deprived Emma of food, tortured her, endangered her welfare, deprived her of necessary medical care, bruised her face, forced her to exercise to an unreasonable level, inflicted inappropriate physical discipline, and burned her. Court records showed that Kristie had been in multiple custody battles between 2016 and 2017 over Emma with Emma's great-aunt and other family members. Kristie and Brandon had lived with Emma in both Indiana and Smyrna, Delaware. At the time of Emma's murder, the couple had lived a mile from the Little Lass softball fields where Emma's remains would eventually be found.

The murder and abuse trial for Kristie and Brandon was originally scheduled for July 10, 2023. If convicted, Kristie faced a minimum of 15 years in prison and a maximum of life in prison without the possibility of parole, and Brandon faced up to 44 years in prison.

=== Guilty pleas ===
On May 25, 2023, Kristie Haas entered a plea bargain to the charges of first-degree murder by abuse or neglect, abusing a corpse, and three felony counts of endangering the welfare of a child, with her remaining charges dropped. As a part of the plea deal, both the prosecution and defense asked for 30 years in prison followed by a 20-year suspended sentence, and for sentences of probation on the remaining counts.

Emma's other family members were shocked and angered by the plea deal due to Kristie's somewhat lax sentence recommendation, since she had originally faced up to life in prison, and the fact that they were not informed of the deal ahead of time. Emma's great-aunt stated, "I feel like I'm being hit by a bus all over again. I am so mad that they didn't even bother to say a damn thing to any of us. We should have had the right to know, in case we wanted to be there."

Delaware Attorney General Kathy Jennings stated of Kristie's guilty plea,

What this defendant did to her own daughter was heinous, and this week brings a complex and harrowing case to a just end. This conviction doesn't just bring certainty in outcome and a lengthy sentence—it ensures that Emma's young siblings, who would otherwise have been absolutely required to testify at trial, will not be re-traumatized by having to relive the terror of Emma's last days. I'm enormously grateful to the DOJ team and many investigators who took on this difficult case; identified Emma; and ultimately secured justice. Today, like every day, we're reminded to hold our young ones close.

— Attorney General Kathy Jennings

On May 26, 2023, it was revealed that Brandon L. Haas, the step-father of Emma and husband of Kristie Haas had also been given a plea deal in Emma's case. He pleaded guilty to one felony count and three misdemeanor counts of endangering the welfare of a child, with the remaining charges dropped. Prosecutors recommended a sentence of probation, and he faced a maximum of 8 years in prison. He formerly faced up to 44 years in prison if his case went to trial with all his initial charges. Brandon had agreed to the plea deal in February 2023, originally in exchange for testimony against Kristie. This was not revealed publicly at the time due to the fact that Kristie had written a letter to Brandon telling him to take out a life insurance policy on her because she was contemplating suicide. Attorneys feared there may have been consequences in this regard if Kristie learned of the plea. Emma's family were similarly outraged by Brandon's plea deal given his lenient sentencing recommendation. Emma's aunt, Kelsey Cole Navarro said of Brandon's plea deal, "I think it's atrocious. Maybe he didn't kill her, but he was with Kristie for a whole year after and didn't say anything. How do you do something so heinous and be a part of that for so long? And then just get a slap on the wrist?"

=== Sentencing ===
On September 14, 2023, Kristie Haas was sentenced by Superior Court Judge Noel Primos to the recommended sentence of 30 years in prison for the murder of Emma. Kristie stated at her sentencing, "I'm sorry for all the hurt that I inflicted and the pain that I caused ... I knew everything was wrong, and I was so messed up because of everything I did. I thought I could get away with it, to be honest." Kristie blamed her actions on drug addiction, stating, "I wasn't okay then. I'm trying my best to be better than I was."

The same day, Brandon Haas was also sentenced for endangering the welfare of Emma and her siblings. Though Primos followed the prosecutors' recommended sentence for Kristie, he rejected the prosecutors' recommended sentence of probation for Brandon, instead sentencing him to 4 years and 1 month in prison. At the sentencing, Brandon tearfully apologized for not going to authorities after the murder of Emma, stating that Kristie told him that he would be blamed for Emma's death. He maintained that he did not know what happened between Emma and Kristie before Emma's death.

Emma's father, Joshua Douthitt stated at court, "I will never comprehend why Emma Grace had to lose her life. I don't know what this beautiful little baby could have done to deserve this." Kristie's defense attorney, Patrick Collins stated that "the true monster" was not Kristie, but rather drug addiction.

On September 14, 2026, Brandon Haas was released from prison to home confinement.

== Legacy ==
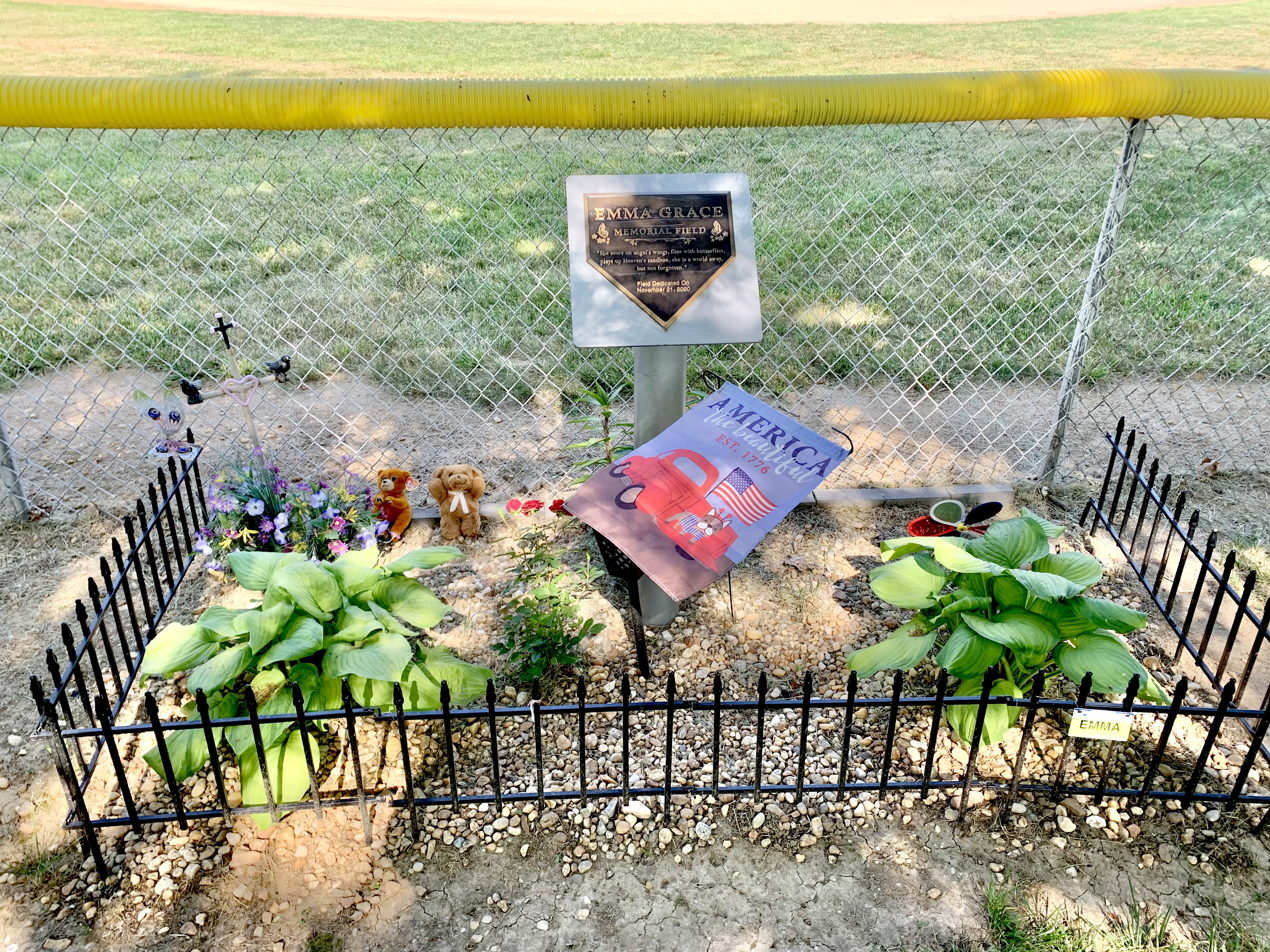
Emma Grace Memorial Field tribute sign in Smyrna, Delaware

The Little Lass softball field where Emma's remains were found was dedicated as the Emma Grace Memorial Field in November 2020.

== See also ==
- Murder of Amore Wiggins, similar child murder case
- Murder of Kenyatta Odom
- Death of William DaShawn Hamilton
- List of solved missing person cases (post-2000)
