= Barrow County, Georgia =

County in Georgia, United States

- County
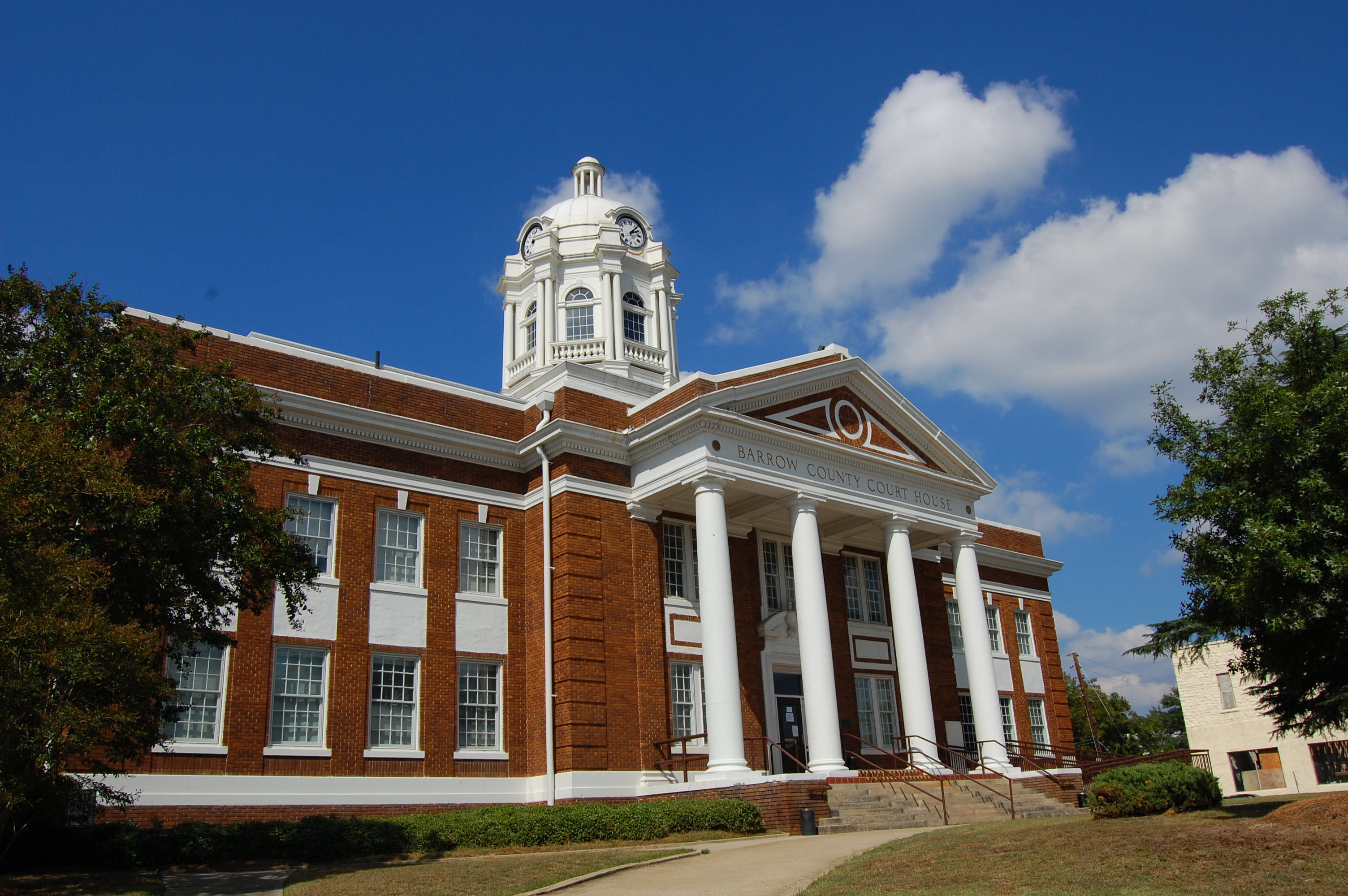
- Barrow County Courthouse in Winder

- Seal Logo

- Location within the U.S. state of Georgia
- Coordinates: 33°59′N 83°43′W
- Country: United States
- State: Georgia
- Founded: July 7, 1914; 112 years ago
- Named for: David Crenshaw Barrow Jr.
- Seat: Winder
- Largest city: Winder

Area
  - Total: 163 sq mi (420 km^{2})
  - Land: 160 sq mi (410 km^{2})
  - Water: 2.6 sq mi (6.7 km^{2}) 1.6%

Population (2020)
  - Total: 83,505
  - Estimate (2025): 99,773 ▲
  - Density: 520/sq mi (200/km^{2})
- Time zone: UTC−5 (Eastern)
  - Summer (DST): UTC−4 (EDT)
- Congressional district: 10th
- Website: barrowga.org

Barrow County is a county located in the East Central region of the U.S. state of Georgia. As of the 2020 census, its population was 83,505. Its county seat is Winder. Barrow County is included in the Atlanta–Sandy Springs–Roswell metropolitan statistical area.

== History ==
Barrow County was created from portions of Gwinnett, Jackson, and Walton counties when Georgia voters approved a constitutional amendment on November 3, 1914, making Barrow County the 149th Georgia county; there are now 159. Barrow County was named after David Crenshaw Barrow Jr., a University of Georgia mathematics and engineering professor who was later Chancellor serving in that position from 1906 to 1925. Barrow died on January 11, 1929, in Athens and is buried in Oconee Hill Cemetery in Athens.

In 2024, a school shooting occurred at Apalachee High School, part of Barrow County Schools.

== Geography ==
According to the U.S. Census Bureau, the county has a total area of 163 square miles (420 km^{2}), of which 160 square miles (410 km^{2}) is land and 2.6 square miles (6.7 km^{2}) (1.6%) is water. The entirety of Barrow County is located in the Upper Oconee River sub-basin of the Altamaha River basin.

=== Adjacent counties ===
- Hall County – north
- Clarke County – east at single point
- Jackson County – east
- Oconee County – southeast
- Walton County – south
- Gwinnett County – west

== Communities ==
=== Cities ===
- Auburn
- Statham
- Winder

=== Towns ===
- Bethlehem
- Braselton (Mostly in Jackson County, Partly in Gwinnett and Hall Counties)
- Carl

=== Census-designated place ===
- Russell

=== Other unincorporated communities ===
- Barrow Heights
- Mulberry
- Whistleville

== Demographics ==
Historical population
Census	Pop.	Note	%±
1920	13,188		—
1930	12,401		−6.0%
1940	13,064		5.3%
1950	13,115		0.4%
1960	14,485		10.4%
1970	16,859		16.4%
1980	21,354		26.7%
1990	29,721		39.2%
2000	46,144		55.3%
2010	69,367		50.3%
2020	83,505		20.4%
2025 (est.)	99,773	▲	19.5%
U.S. Decennial Census; 1790-1880 1890-1910; 1920-1930 1930-1940; 1940-1950 1960-1980; 1980-2000 2010 2020

=== Racial and ethnic composition ===
Barrow County, Georgia – Racial and ethnic composition Note: the US Census treats Hispanic/Latino as an ethnic category. This table excludes Latinos from the racial categories and assigns them to a separate category. Hispanics/Latinos may be of any race.
Race / Ethnicity (NH = Non-Hispanic)	Pop 1980	Pop 1990	Pop 2000	Pop 2010	Pop 2020	% 1980	% 1990	% 2000	% 2010	% 2020
White alone (NH)	18,064	25,834	38,543	51,736	55,582	84.59%	86.92%	83.53%	74.58%	66.56%
Black or African American alone (NH)	3,115	3,348	4,456	7,769	10,141	14.59%	11.26%	9.66%	11.20%	12.14%
Native American or Alaska Native alone (NH)	8	64	119	130	130	0.04%	0.22%	0.26%	0.19%	0.16%
Asian alone (NH)	19	218	1,000	2,359	3,233	0.09%	0.73%	2.17%	3.40%	3.87%
Native Hawaiian or Pacific Islander alone (NH)	x	x	15	28	17	x	x	0.03%	0.04%	0.02%
Other race alone (NH)	5	4	27	141	459	0.02%	0.01%	0.06%	0.20%	0.55%
Mixed race or Multiracial (NH)	x	x	524	1,167	3,383	x	x	1.14%	1.68%	4.05%
Hispanic or Latino (any race)	143	253	1,460	6,037	10,560	0.67%	0.85%	3.16%	8.70%	12.65%
Total	21,354	29,721	46,144	69,367	83,505	100.00%	100.00%	100.00%	100.00%	100.00%

=== 2020 census ===
As of the 2020 census, the county had a population of 83,505. The median age was 36.4 years. 25.5% of residents were under the age of 18 and 13.4% of residents were 65 years of age or older. For every 100 females there were 95.9 males, and for every 100 females age 18 and over there were 93.3 males age 18 and over. 67.0% of residents lived in urban areas, while 33.0% lived in rural areas.

The racial makeup of the county was 69.0% White, 12.4% Black or African American, 0.5% American Indian and Alaska Native, 3.9% Asian, 0.0% Native Hawaiian and Pacific Islander, 6.0% from some other race, and 8.1% from two or more races. Hispanic or Latino residents of any race comprised 12.6% of the population.

There were 28,727 households in the county, of which 38.8% had children under the age of 18 living with them and 24.0% had a female householder with no spouse or partner present. About 19.4% of all households were made up of individuals and 8.5% had someone living alone who was 65 years of age or older.

There were 30,019 housing units, of which 4.3% were vacant. Among occupied housing units, 77.4% were owner-occupied and 22.6% were renter-occupied. The homeowner vacancy rate was 1.5% and the rental vacancy rate was 4.2%.

=== 2010 census ===
In 2010, there were 69,367 people, 23,971 households, and 18,214 families living in the county. The population density was 432.7 inhabitants per square mile (167.1/km^{2}). There were 26,400 housing units at an average density of 164.7 per square mile (63.6/km^{2}).

In 2010, the racial and ethnic makeup of the county was 78.8% White, 11.4% Black or African American, 3.4% Asian, 0.3% American Indian, 0.1% Pacific islander, 3.7% from other races, and 2.3% from two or more races. Those of Hispanic or Latino origin made up 8.7% of the population. Barrow County is considered a part of the Atlanta, GA combined statistical area despite its comparatively small population. In terms of ancestry, 20.6% were American, 10.7% were Irish, 9.1% were German, and 8.5% were English.

In 2010, the median income for a household in the county was $48,958 and the median income for a family was $55,415. Males had a median income of $42,869 versus $33,175 for females. The per capita income for the county was $20,882. About 9.4% of families and 12.6% of the population were below the poverty line, including 16.0% of those under age 18 and 14.2% of those age 65 or over.

=== American Community Survey ===
According to the 2022 American Community Survey, its median household income was $78,216 with a per capita income of $30,903. Approximately 9.5% of the population lived at or below the poverty line.

=== 2000 census ===
In 2000, the racial makeup of the county was 84.84% White, 10.72% Black or African American, 0.30% Native American, 2.20% Asian, 0.04% Pacific Islander, 1.50% from other races, and 1.40% from two or more races. 3.16% of the population were Hispanic or Latino of any race.

== Education ==
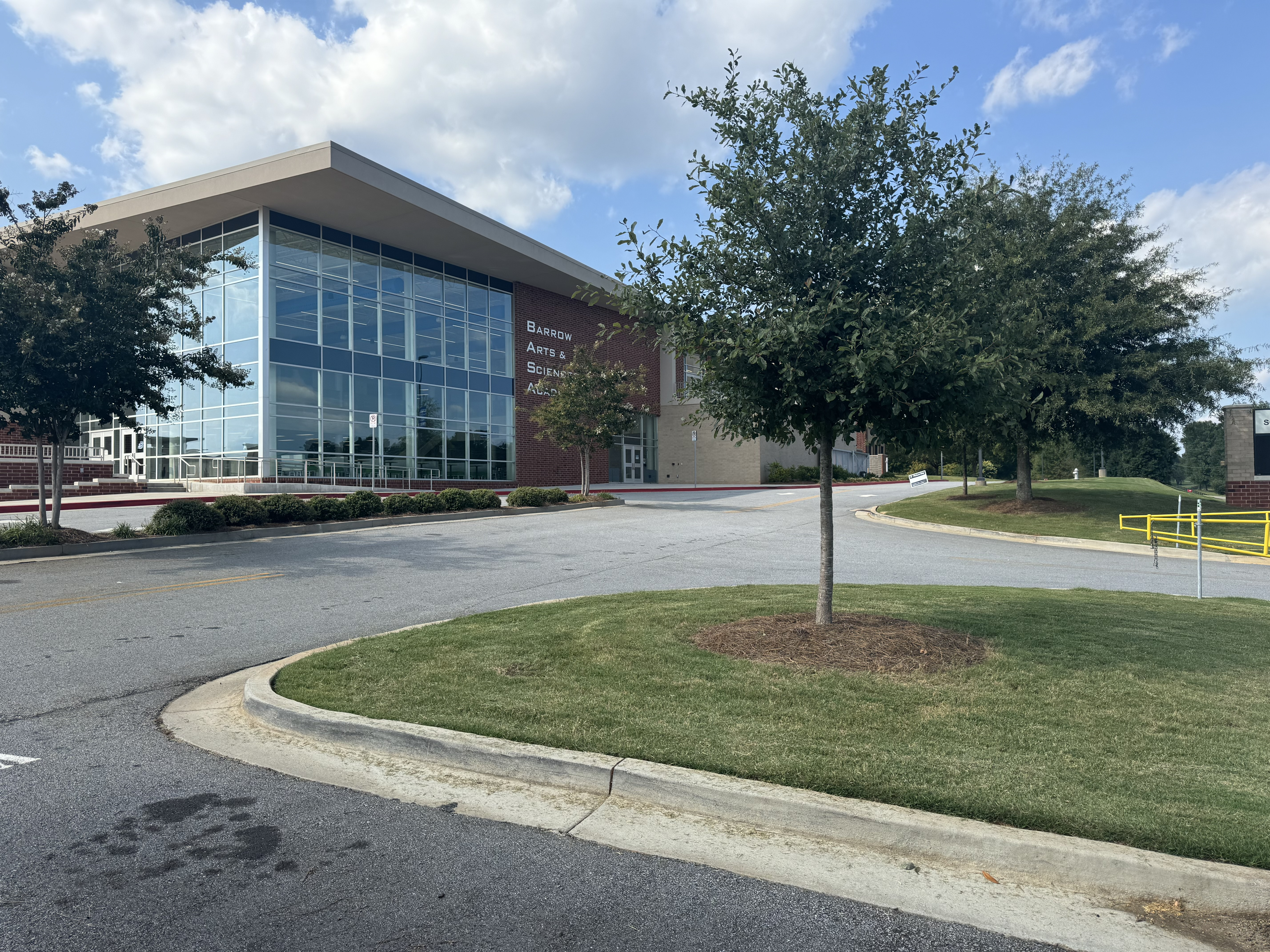
Barrow Arts and Sciences Academy

Barrow County Schools is the sole school district covering the county.

Winder-Barrow Cluster:

- Winder-Barrow High School
- Richard B. Russell Middle School
- Winder-Barrow Middle School (1956–2013)
- Bear Creek Middle School (WBMS replacement)
- Holsenbeck Elementary School
- Bramlett Elementary School
- Statham Elementary School
- County Line Elementary
- Winder Elementary School

Apalachee Cluster:

- Apalachee High School
- Westside Middle School
- Haymon-Morris Middle School
- Auburn Elementary School
- Kennedy Elementary School
- Bethlehem Elementary School
- Yargo Elementary School
- Barrow Arts & Sciences Academy

== Transportation ==
=== Major highways ===
- Interstate 85 / State Route 403 (unsigned)
- U.S. Route 29 / State Route 316
  - U.S. 29 Business
- State Route 8
- State Route 11
- State Route 53
- State Route 81
- State Route 82
- State Route 124
- State Route 211
- State Route 324
- State Route 330

== Politics ==
Barrow County is a Republican stronghold in presidential elections, having been so since 1984. As of the 2020s, Barrow County is a strongly Republican voting county, voting 69% for Donald Trump in 2024. For elections to the United States House of Representatives, Barrow County is part of Georgia's 10th congressional district, currently represented by Mike Collins. For elections to the Georgia State Senate, Barrow County is divided between districts 45, 46 and 47. For elections to the Georgia House of Representatives, Barrow County is part of districts 104, 119 and 120.

United States presidential election results for Barrow County, Georgia
Year	Republican		Democratic		Third party(ies)	
Year	No.	%	No.	%	No.	%
1916	102	10.60%	712	74.01%	148	15.38%
1920	412	36.05%	731	63.95%	0	0.00%
1924	88	11.55%	501	65.75%	173	22.70%
1928	684	58.81%	479	41.19%	0	0.00%
1932	23	2.01%	1,111	97.03%	11	0.96%
1936	172	12.69%	1,181	87.16%	2	0.15%
1940	219	11.91%	1,615	87.82%	5	0.27%
1944	257	14.52%	1,513	85.48%	0	0.00%
1948	155	7.55%	1,554	75.69%	344	16.76%
1952	236	9.07%	2,367	90.93%	0	0.00%
1956	442	16.32%	2,266	83.68%	0	0.00%
1960	577	17.30%	2,759	82.70%	0	0.00%
1964	2,316	50.42%	2,277	49.58%	0	0.00%
1968	1,372	26.52%	1,070	20.68%	2,731	52.79%
1972	3,423	79.79%	867	20.21%	0	0.00%
1976	1,364	22.29%	4,756	77.71%	0	0.00%
1980	2,284	36.20%	3,876	61.44%	149	2.36%
1984	4,123	63.53%	2,367	36.47%	0	0.00%
1988	4,738	65.64%	2,442	33.83%	38	0.53%
1992	4,328	43.36%	3,991	39.98%	1,663	16.66%
1996	5,342	51.65%	3,928	37.98%	1,072	10.37%
2000	7,925	65.49%	3,657	30.22%	520	4.30%
2004	13,520	76.17%	4,095	23.07%	135	0.76%
2008	17,625	71.55%	6,657	27.02%	351	1.42%
2012	18,725	74.10%	6,028	23.85%	517	2.05%
2016	21,108	72.35%	6,580	22.55%	1,486	5.09%
2020	26,804	70.64%	10,453	27.55%	689	1.82%
2024	30,730	69.95%	12,949	29.47%	255	0.58%

United States Senate election results for Barrow County, Georgia2
Year	Republican		Democratic		Third party(ies)	
Year	No.	%	No.	%	No.	%
2020	26,317	69.94%	10,066	26.75%	1,244	3.31%
2020	22,789	71.07%	9,276	28.93%	0	0.00%

United States Senate election results for Barrow County, Georgia3
Year	Republican		Democratic		Third party(ies)	
Year	No.	%	No.	%	No.	%
2020	14,483	38.94%	6,025	16.20%	16,682	44.86%
2020	22,660	70.64%	9,417	29.36%	0	0.00%
2022	20,136	68.79%	8,244	28.16%	893	3.05%
2022	17,945	70.66%	7,453	29.34%	0	0.00%

Georgia Gubernatorial election results for Barrow County
Year	Republican		Democratic		Third party(ies)	
Year	No.	%	No.	%	No.	%
2022	21,833	74.19%	7,309	24.84%	288	0.98%

== See also ==
- National Register of Historic Places listings in Barrow County, Georgia
- List of counties in Georgia
