= Apalachee High School =

Public high school in Winder, Georgia, United States

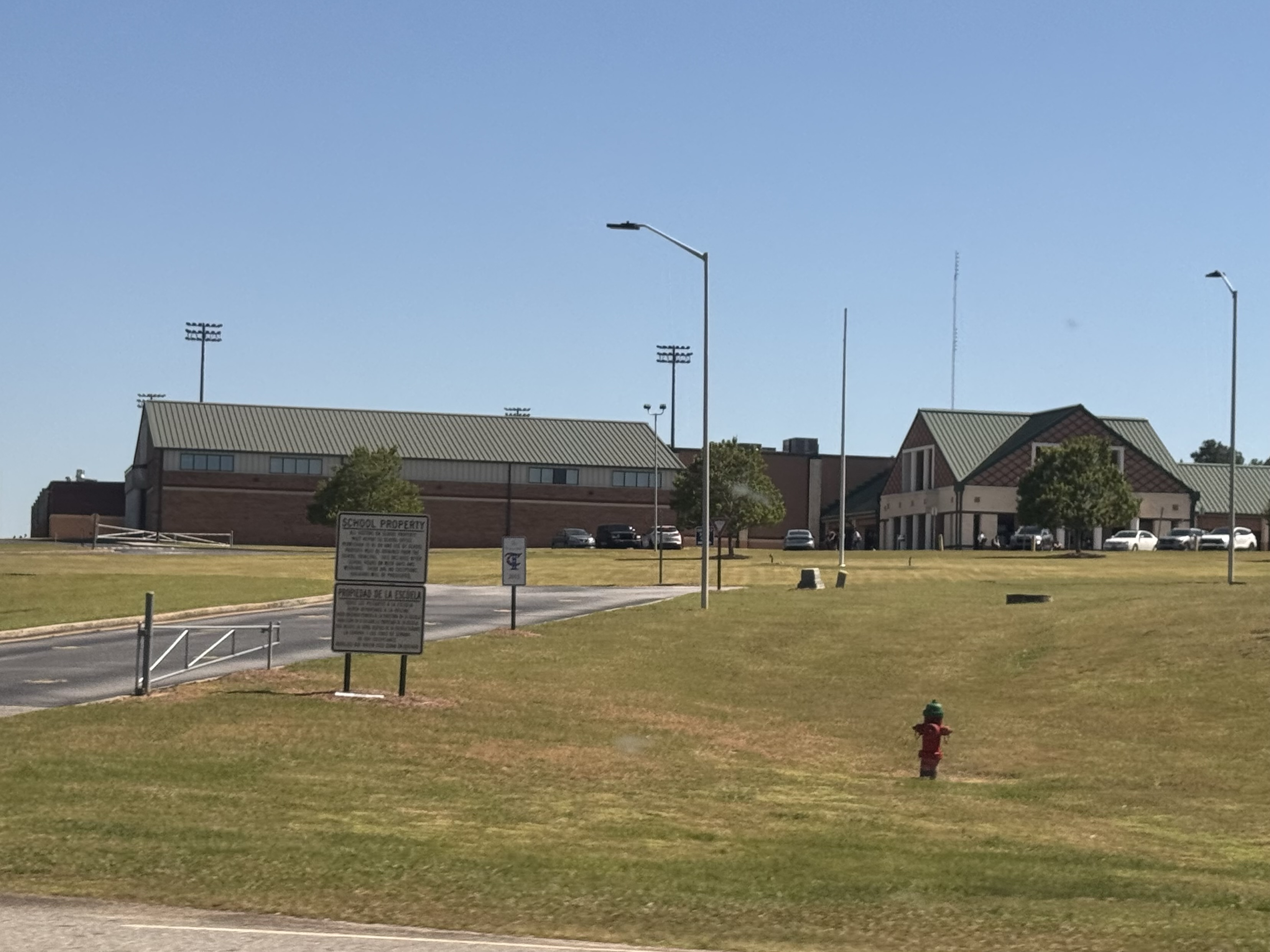

Location
- 940 Haymon Morris Road; Winder, Barrow County, Georgia 30680; United States
- 33°56′54″N 83°47′9″W

Information
- Type: Public high school
- Established: 2000 (26 years ago)
- School board: 9
- School district: Barrow County Schools
- NCES District ID: 1300290
- School code: GA-607-0101
- CEEB code: 113268
- NCES School ID: 130029002350
- Principal: Jessica Rehberg
- Faculty: 124.50 (on an FTE basis)
- Grades: 9-12
- Enrollment: 1,928 (2023–2024)
  - Grade 9: 553
  - Grade 10: 525
  - Grade 11: 471
  - Grade 12: 379
- Student to teacher ratio: 15.49
- Campus type: Rural: Fringe
- Colors: Blue and gold
- Nickname: Wildcats
- USNWR ranking: 9,501
- Feeder schools: Haymon-Morris Middle School, Westside Middle School
- Website: ahs.barrow.k12.ga.us

Apalachee High School is a public high school located near Winder, Georgia, United States. The school mascot is a wildcat. Apalachee is a part of Barrow County Schools, a Title I district. Feeder schools include Haymon-Morris Middle School and Westside Middle School.

The school is Barrow County's second high school and opened in 2000. It is in an unincorporated area in the county. Its attendance boundary includes southern Winder, Bethlehem, Carl, and the Barrow County portion of Auburn.

As of 2024 it has about 1,900 students in grades 9–12. The student body is a mix of White, Hispanic, and Black students with a smaller percentage of Asian students. Almost half the students come from families documented as economically disadvantaged.

== 2024 shooting ==
On September 4, 2024, a mass shooting occurred at the school, resulting in the deaths of two students and two teachers, as well as another nine injuries. A 14-year-old student, Colt Gray, was arrested along with his father, Colin Gray.

== Notable alumni ==
- Kamar Baldwin – basketball player
