= Whistleville, Georgia =

Whistleville
- Unincorporated community
- Location within the state of Georgia
- Coordinates: 33°59′37″N 83°46′59″W
- Country: United States
- State: Georgia
- County: Barrow
- Elevation: 997 ft (304 m)
- Time zone: UTC-5 (Eastern (EST))
  - Summer (DST): UTC-4 (EDT)
- GNIS feature ID: 333408

Whistleville is an unincorporated community located in Barrow County, Georgia, United States.
