= Caylee's Law =

U.S. laws requiring parents to report missing children

A map of the legal status of Caylee's Law in the United States. States with law signed by governor States where bill died in legislature

Caylee's Law is the unofficial name for bills proposed or passed in several U.S. states that make it a felony for a parent or legal guardian to fail to report a missing child, in cases where the parent knew or should have known that the child was possibly in danger. The first such bill was introduced shortly after the high-profile Casey Anthony trial, due to Anthony not reporting her three-year-old daughter Caylee Marie Anthony missing for a period of 31 days.

== History ==
The idea for the bill originated with protesters who disagreed with the jury's verdict in the case. Anthony was found not guilty of first degree murder, aggravated child abuse, and aggravated manslaughter of a child on July 5, 2011. Immediately after the trial, support appeared for imposing requirements on parents to notify law enforcement of the death or disappearance of a child and make a parent or guardian's failure to report their child missing a felony. One petition, written by Michelle Crowder on Change.org, has gained nearly 1.3 million electronic signatures. In response to this and other petitions, lawmakers of Florida, Oklahoma, New York, North Carolina, Ohio and West Virginia began drafting versions of "Caylee's Law".

== Legal status ==
State	Bill	Date approved	Notes
Alabama	SB1	2013-06-10	Punishable by up to 10 years in prison.
Connecticut	HB 5512	2012-10-01	Public Act 12-112
Florida	HB 37	2012-04-06	Punishable by up to five years in prison.
Illinois	SB 2537	2012-08-24	Public Act 097-1079
Kansas	HB 2534	2012-05-16	
Louisiana	HB 600	2012-06-01	Act No. 454; Punishable by up to 1 year in prison.
New Jersey	A 4297	2012-01-05	A fourth-degree crime (felony).
North Carolina	HB 149	2013-05-17	Session Law 2013-52; Class I Felony; Punishable by up to 1 year in prison.
Oklahoma	SB 1721	Died in committee	Approved by the Senate.
South Dakota	SB 43	2012-03-19	
Virginia	HB 494	Died in committee	Introduced by Richmond Delegate Rosalyn R. Dance.
Wisconsin	AB 397	2012-04-09	

== Notable cases ==
In South Dakota, two people were charged with failure to report the death of two-year-old Rielee Lovell under the new law. The defense attorney for Laurie Cournoyer claimed that the law violated his client's right against self-incrimination, saying "essentially what the state has done is criminalized a citizen's right to remain silent."

== Opposition ==
Critics and opponents of Caylee's Law state various reasons for their opposition. Some critics say the law is unconstitutional in that it violates the 5th Amendment. Critics also claim the law will mostly harm innocent parents. The laws as proposed do not distinguish the cause or place of death, therefore even parents whose children die in the hospital due to sudden illnesses are still required to report the death to the local police within the law's time frame or face felony charges in addition to the sudden tragic loss of their child. One critic noted the law could lead to overcompliance and false reports by parents wary of becoming suspects, wasting police resources and leading to legitimate abductions going uninvestigated during the critical first few hours. Additionally innocent people could get snared in the law, for example, if the parents first begin searching for a child instead of immediately calling police, or if parents who are overcome by emotional shock and grief fail to report a child's unexpected death in a hospital. Moreover, critics note that the law isn't likely to affect a parent who murders a child either intentionally or in a fit of anger or rage, since the law will not make it more likely that such parent would report the death within the given time limit. Critics argue that the law is a waste of time and resources, because the law would bog down police with investigations and prosecutions of parents who innocently fail to report within the time limits and with non-emergency reports from parents fearful of prosecution, while those parents that the law is intended to punish will be unaffected by the law because they are no more likely to make a report than they would be without the law and their failure to report is protected by the fifth amendment to the U.S. Constitution.
