= Auburn, Georgia =

- City
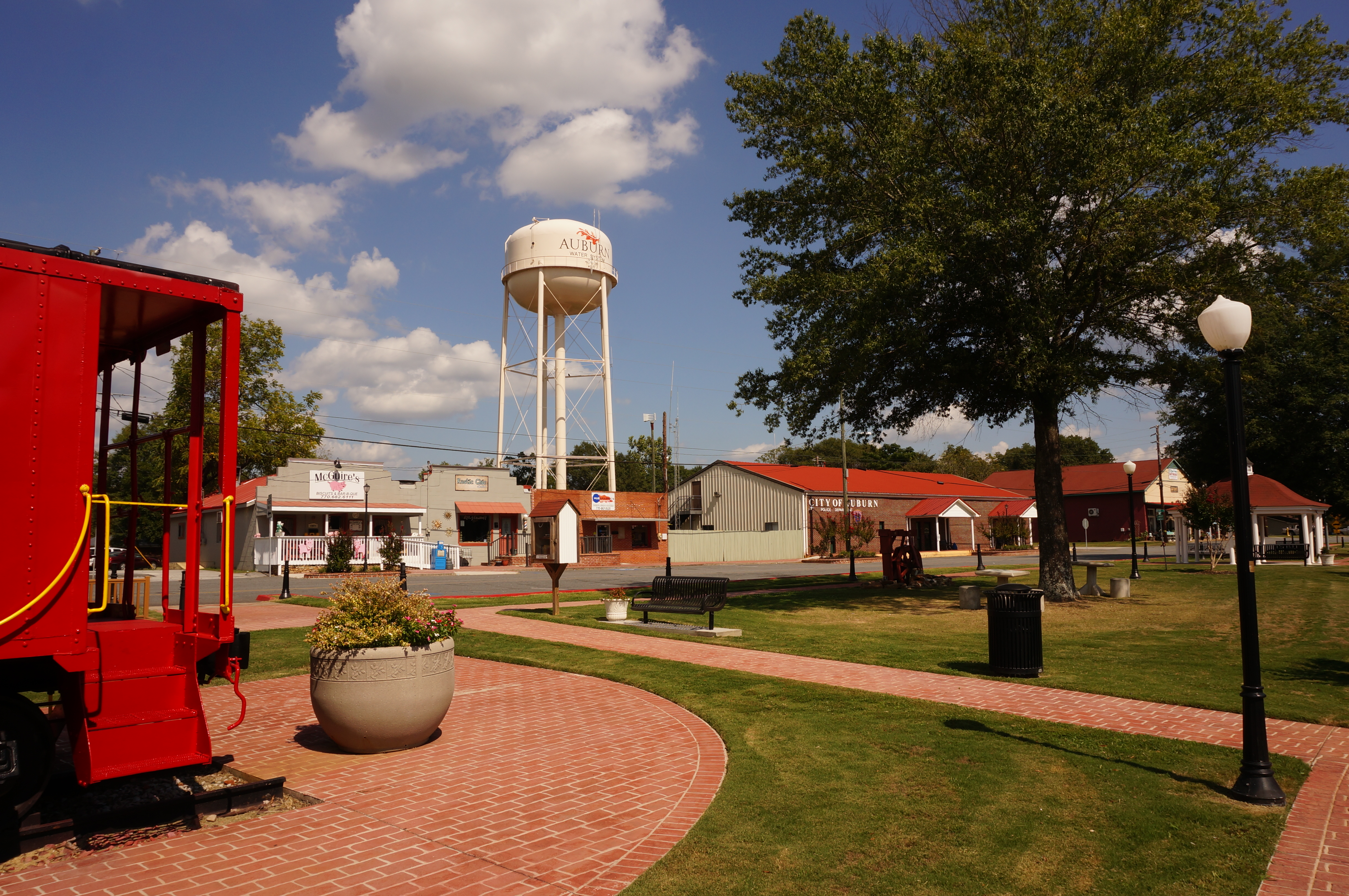
- Central Auburn in the city's historic district

- Flag Seal Logo
- Motto: "Old southern charm with a vision for the future" "Come grow with us"
- Location in Barrow County and the state of Georgia
- Coordinates: 34°00′56″N 83°49′55″W
- Country: United States
- State: Georgia
- Counties: Barrow, Gwinnett

Area
  - Total: 6.80 sq mi (17.61 km^{2})
  - Land: 6.77 sq mi (17.54 km^{2})
  - Water: 0.027 sq mi (0.07 km^{2})
- Elevation: 1,024 ft (312 m)

Population (2020)
  - Total: 7,495
  - Density: 1,107/sq mi (427.3/km^{2})
- Time zone: UTC-5 (Eastern (EST))
  - Summer (DST): UTC-4 (EDT)
- ZIP code: 30011
- Area code: 770
- FIPS code: 13-04140
- GNIS feature ID: 2403134
- Website: www.cityofauburn-ga.org

Auburn is a city in Barrow and Gwinnett counties in the U.S. state of Georgia. As of the 2020 census, the city had a population of 7,495.

== History ==
Auburn incorporated in 1892 soon after the railroad was extended to that point.

== Geography ==
Auburn is located in western Barrow County and is 42 miles (68 km) northeast of downtown Atlanta and 27 miles (43 km) west of Athens.

According to the United States Census Bureau, the town has a total area of 6.5 square miles (16.8 km^{2}), of which 6.4 square miles (16.7 km^{2}) is land and 0.03 square miles (0.07 km^{2}), or 0.39%, is water.

== Demographics ==
Historical population
Census	Pop.	Note	%±
1900	161		—
1910	217		34.8%
1920	290		33.6%
1930	230		−20.7%
1940	286		24.3%
1950	301		5.2%
1960	374		24.3%
1970	361		−3.5%
1980	692		91.7%
1990	3,139		353.6%
2000	6,904		119.9%
2010	6,887		−0.2%
2020	7,495		8.8%
2025 (est.)	10,110	▲	34.9%
U.S. Decennial Census; 2025

=== 2020 census ===
As of the 2020 census, Auburn had a population of 7,495. The median age was 36.3 years. 24.2% of residents were under the age of 18 and 11.6% of residents were 65 years of age or older. For every 100 females there were 96.0 males, and for every 100 females age 18 and over there were 95.2 males age 18 and over.

95.8% of residents lived in urban areas, while 4.2% lived in rural areas.

There were 2,650 households in Auburn, of which 38.4% had children under the age of 18 living in them. Of all households, 49.8% were married-couple households, 17.7% were households with a male householder and no spouse or partner present, and 25.3% were households with a female householder and no spouse or partner present. About 20.1% of all households were made up of individuals and 8.8% had someone living alone who was 65 years of age or older. As of the 2020 census, there were 1,849 families in the city.

There were 2,763 housing units, of which 4.1% were vacant. The homeowner vacancy rate was 2.3% and the rental vacancy rate was 3.9%.

Auburn racial composition as of 2020
Race	Num.	Perc.
White (non-Hispanic)	5,325	71.05%
Black or African American (non-Hispanic)	493	6.58%
Native American	14	0.19%
Asian	307	4.1%
Pacific Islander	3	0.04%
Other/Mixed	420	5.6%
Hispanic or Latino	933	12.45%

=== Demographic estimates ===
As of 2022, 6,678 people in Auburn lived in Barrow County while 209 people lived in Gwinnett County.

== Education ==
The portion in Barrow County is in Barrow County Schools. The Barrow district operates Auburn Elementary School, which feeds into Westside Middle School and Apalachee High School.

The portion in Gwinnett County is in Gwinnett County Public Schools. That portion's zoned schools are Mulberry Elementary School, Dacula Middle School, and Dacula High School.
