= Barrow County Schools =

School district in Georgia (U.S. state)

Barrow County School System

Address
- 179 West Athens Street Winder, Georgia, 30680; United States
- Coordinates: 33°59′51″N 83°43′58″W

District information
- Grades: Pre-kindergarten – 12
- Superintendent: Dallas LeDuff

Students and staff
- Enrollment: 14,882 (2022–23)
- Faculty: 1,072.80 (FTE)
- Staff: 845.40 (FTE)
- Student–teacher ratio: 13.87

Other information
- Accreditation: Southern Association of Colleges and Schools; Georgia Accrediting Commission
- Telephone: (770) 867-4527
- Fax: (770) 867-4540
- Website: barrow.k12.ga.us

Barrow County Schools is a public school district based in Winder, Georgia, United States, serving Barrow County. The boundary of the district is that of the county.

== Schools ==
=== Elementary schools ===
- Auburn Elementary
- Austin Road Elementary
- Bethlehem Elementary
- Bramlett Elementary
- County Line Elementary
- Holsenbeck Elementary
- Kennedy Elementary
- Statham Elementary
- Winder Elementary
- Yargo Elementary

=== Middle schools ===
- Bear-Creek Middle School
- Haymon-Morris Middle School
- Russell Middle School
- Westside Middle School
- Arts and Innovation Magnet Program (AIM)

=== High schools ===
- Apalachee High School
- Winder-Barrow High School
- Barrow Arts and Sciences Academy

=== Learning Centers ===
- Snodon Preparatory School (now closed and replaced with Foothills Charter High School. Students who attended are divided between AHS, WBHS, and Foothills Charter.)
- Sims Academy of Innovation & Technology

=== Former ===
- Beech Creek Middle School
- Winder-Barrow Middle School (closed 2013)
  - The building first opened in 1955.
- Winder-Statham High School (1946-1956)
