= Murder in Georgia (U.S. state) law =

Aspect of Georgia criminal law

Murder in Georgia law constitutes the killing, under circumstances defined by law, of people within or under the jurisdiction of the U.S. state of Georgia.

The United States Centers for Disease Control and Prevention reported that in the year 2021, the state had a murder rate somewhat above the median for the entire country.

== Definitions ==
=== Malice murder ===
Georgia has five different homicide offenses in total, including the three different types of murder. The most serious forms of homicide are malice murder and felony murder. Malice murder is defined as when a person unlawfully and with malice aforethought, either express or implied, causes the death of another human being. It is punished by life in prison without the possibility of parole, life-with-parole after 30 years, or the death penalty. The only exception for seeking the death penalty is for murders committed when the defendant was under the age of 18, since the death penalty for minors was abolished nationwide in 2005.

=== Felony murder ===
Felony murder is defined as when a person causes the death of another human being during the commitment of a felony (besides second-degree child cruelty), irrespective of malice. It is punished by life-without-parole, life-with-parole after 30 years, or the death penalty if the death of the victim was intended.

=== Second-degree murder ===
Second-degree murder is the newest homicide statute in Georgia law, being created in 2014. It is defined as causing the death of another human being while committing second-degree child cruelty, irrespective of malice. The statute was created to address the issue of child deaths caused by intentional abuse (first-degree child cruelty) and accidental abuse (second-degree child cruelty) being punished as the same under the state's felony murder rule. It is punished by 10 to 30 years in prison.

== Penalties ==
The sentences for homicide offenses in Georgia are listed below.

| Offense | Mandatory sentence |
|---|---|
| Involuntary manslaughter | 1 to 10 years |
| Voluntary manslaughter | 1 to 20 years in prison |
| Second-degree murder | 10 to 30 years in prison |
| Felony murder | Death or; Life imprisonment without the possibility of parole or; Life-with-parole after 30 years |
| Malice murder | Death or; Life imprisonment without the possibility of parole or; Life-with-parole after 30 years |
