= 2016–17 Big Ten Conference men's basketball season =

- League: NCAA Division I
- Sport: Basketball
- Teams: 14
- TV partner(s): Big Ten Network, ESPN, CBS

2017 NBA draft

2016–17 NCAA Division I men's basketball season
- Regular season champions: Purdue
- Runners-up: Wisconsin and Maryland
- Season MVP: Caleb Swanigan
- Top scorer: Peter Jok

Tournament
- Venue: Verizon Center, Washington, D.C.
- Champions: Michigan
- Runners-up: Wisconsin
- Finals MVP: Derrick Walton Jr.

Basketball seasons
- 2015–16 2017–18

2016–17 Big Ten Conference men's basketball standings
	Conf.				Overall
Team	W		L	PCT	W		L	PCT
No. 15 Purdue	14	–	4	.778	27	–	8	.771
No. 25 Wisconsin	12	–	6	.667	27	–	10	.730
Maryland	12	–	6	.667	24	–	9	.727
Minnesota	11	–	7	.611	24	–	10	.706
No. 23 Michigan †	10	–	8	.556	26	–	12	.684
Northwestern	10	–	8	.556	24	–	12	.667
Michigan State	10	–	8	.556	20	–	15	.571
Iowa	10	–	8	.556	19	–	15	.559
Illinois	8	–	10	.444	20	–	15	.571
Ohio State	7	–	11	.389	17	–	15	.531
Indiana	7	–	11	.389	18	–	16	.529
Penn State	6	–	12	.333	15	–	18	.455
Nebraska	6	–	12	.333	12	–	19	.387
Rutgers	3	–	15	.167	15	–	18	.455
† 2017 Big Ten tournament winner Rankings from AP poll

The 2016–17 Big Ten men's basketball season began with practices in October 2016, followed by the start of the 2016–17 NCAA Division I men's basketball season in November. The Conference held its preseason media day on October 13 in Washington, D.C. The season began on November 11 and conference play started on December 27.

With a win over Indiana on February 28, 2017, Purdue clinched at least a share of the Big Ten regular season championship. With Wisconsin's loss on March 2, Purdue clinched an outright championship, their 23rd championship, the most in Big Ten history.

The Big Ten tournament was held from March 8 through March 12 at the Verizon Center in Washington, D.C. It was the first Big Ten Conference tournament not held in Indianapolis or Chicago. Michigan won the Big Ten tournament over Wisconsin, becoming the first eight seed and lowest seeded team to win the conference tournament and marking their first win since their vacated win in the inaugural tournament. As a result, Michigan received the conference's automatic bid to the NCAA tournament.

Purdue forward Caleb Swanigan was named Big Ten Player of the Year and a second team Academic All-America. Minnesota coach Richard Pitino was named Big Ten Coach of the Year. Swanigan earned consensus first team All-American recognition and Wisconsin forward Ethan Happ was a third team All-American by multiple media outlets.

Seven Big Ten schools (Maryland, Michigan, Michigan State, Minnesota, Northwestern, Purdue, and Wisconsin) were invited to the NCAA tournament, marking the seventh consecutive year the Big Ten had at least six teams in the Tournament. Northwestern received a bid for the first time in school history. Illinois, Indiana, and Iowa represented the conference in the National Invitation Tournament. The conference achieved an 8–7 record in the NCAA tournament and a 3–3 record in the NIT, highlighted by Michigan, Purdue, and Wisconsin reaching the NCAA Sweet Sixteen and Illinois making the NIT quarterfinals.

== Head coaches ==
=== Coaching changes ===
==== Wisconsin ====
On December 15, 2015, Wisconsin coach Bo Ryan announced he would retire effective immediately leaving associate head coach Greg Gard as interim head coach. Shortly after the regular season, Greg Gard had the interim tag removed as he was announced as the permanent head coach.

==== Rutgers ====
On March 20, 2016, the school fired head coach Eddie Jordan after three years at Rutgers. On March 19, the school hired Steve Pikiell, former head coach at Stony Brook, as head coach.

=== Coaches ===
Team	Head coach	Previous job	Years at school	Overall record	Big Ten record	Big Ten titles	NCAA tournaments	NCAA Final Fours	NCAA Championships
Illinois	John Groce	Ohio	5	95–75	37–53	0	1	0	0
Indiana	Tom Crean	Marquette	9	166–135	71–91	2	4	0	0
Iowa	Fran McCaffery	Siena	7	137–101	64–62	0	4	0	0
Maryland	Mark Turgeon	Texas A&M	6	138–68	38–18*	0	3	0	0
Michigan	John Beilein	West Virginia	10	215–135	98–82	2	7	1	0
Michigan State	Tom Izzo	Michigan State (Asst.)	22	544–220	256–119	7	20	7	1
Minnesota	Richard Pitino	Florida International	4	66–55	27–45	0	0	0	0
Nebraska	Tim Miles	Colorado State	5	72–75	33–57	0	1	0	0
Northwestern	Chris Collins	Duke (Asst.)	4	75–61	30–42	0	0	0	0
Ohio State	Thad Matta	Xavier	13	337–123	150–78	5	9	2	0
Penn State	Pat Chambers	Boston University	6	87–109	29–78	0	0	0	0
Purdue	Matt Painter	Purdue (Assoc.)	12	265–142	127–85	3	9	0	0
Rutgers	Steve Pikiell	Stony Brook	1	15–18	3–15	0	0	0	0
Wisconsin	Greg Gard	Wisconsin (Assoc.)	2	42–18	24–12	0	2	0	0

Notes:

- Year at school includes 2016–17 season.
- Overall and Big Ten records are from time at current school and are through the end the 2016–17 season.
- Turgeon's ACC conference record excluded since Maryland began Big Ten Conference play in 2014–15.
- Following the conclusion of the Big Ten tournament, Illinois fired head coach John Groce. Assistant coach Jamall Walker will coach the team in the NIT.
- Source for Media Guides.

== Preseason ==
Big Ten recruits at the 2016 McDonald's All-American Boys Game

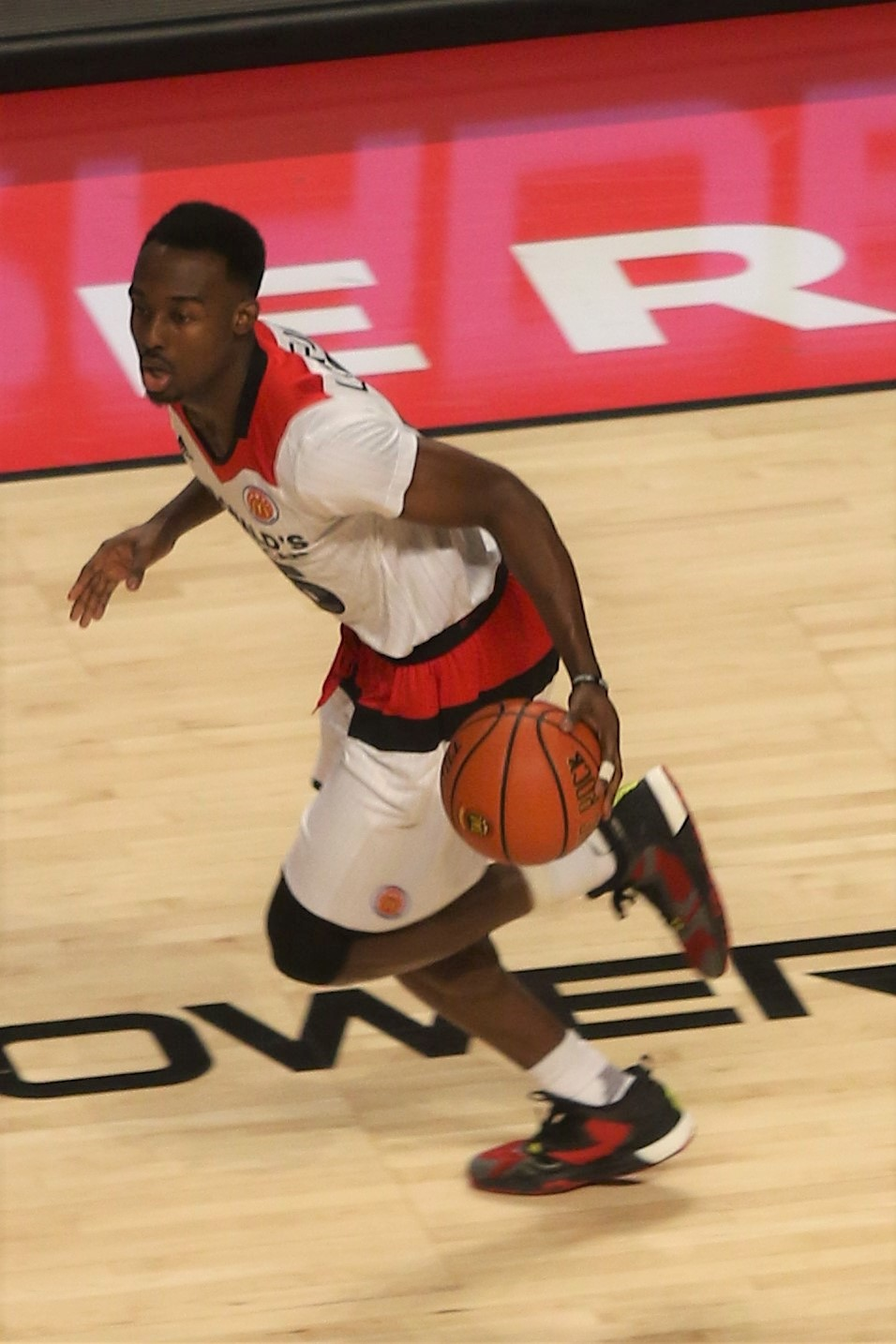
Joshua Langford, Michigan State

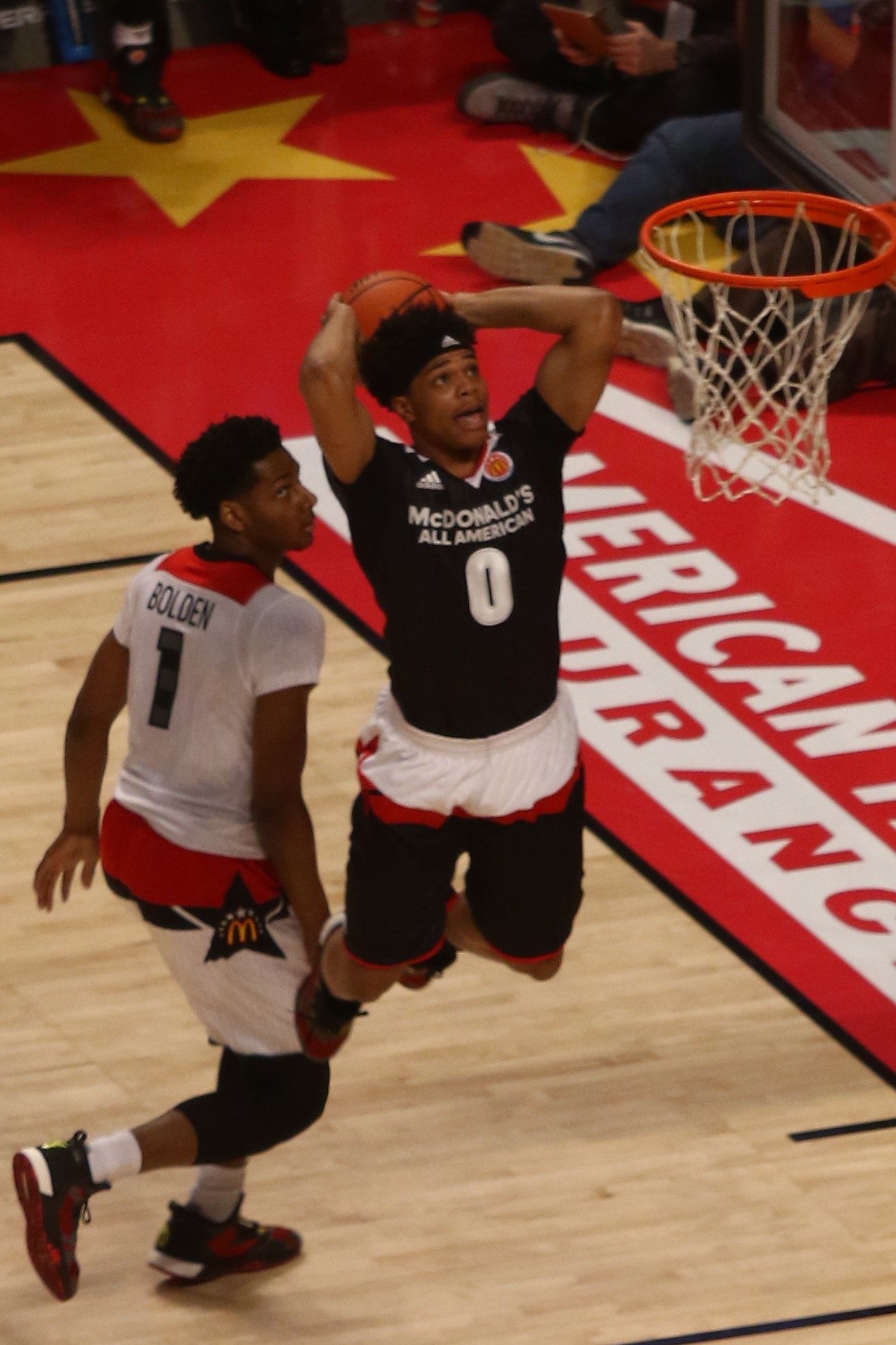
Miles Bridges, Michigan State

=== Preseason All-Big Ten ===
On October 11, 2016, a panel of conference media selected a 10-member preseason All-Big Ten Team and Player of the Year.

Honor	Recipient
Preseason Player of the Year	Nigel Hayes, Wisconsin
Preseason All-Big Ten Team	Malcolm Hill, Illinois
Preseason All-Big Ten Team	James Blackmon Jr., Indiana
Preseason All-Big Ten Team	Thomas Bryant, Indiana
Preseason All-Big Ten Team	Peter Jok, Iowa
Preseason All-Big Ten Team	Melo Trimble, Maryland
Preseason All-Big Ten Team	Derrick Walton Jr., Michigan
Preseason All-Big Ten Team	Caleb Swanigan, Purdue
Preseason All-Big Ten Team	Ethan Happ, Wisconsin
Preseason All-Big Ten Team	Nigel Hayes, Wisconsin
Preseason All-Big Ten Team	Bronson Koenig, Wisconsin

=== Preseason watchlists ===
Below is a table of notable preseason watch lists.

	Wooden	Naismith	Robertson	Cousy	West	Erving	Malone	Abdul-Jabbar	Olson	Tisdale	Notes
OG Anunoby						✓					
James Blackmon Jr.	✓	✓			✓				✓		
Miles Bridges	✓	✓					✓				
Thomas Bryant	✓	✓						✓	✓		
Vincent Edwards						✓					
Isaac Haas								✓			
Ethan Happ	✓	✓						✓			
Eron Harris					✓						
Nigel Hayes	✓	✓					✓		✓		
Malcolm Hill	✓				✓						
Peter Jok	✓	✓			✓				✓		
Bronson Koenig	✓	✓		✓					✓		
Caleb Swanigan	✓	✓					✓				
Jae'Sean Tate						✓					
Melo Trimble	✓	✓		✓					✓		

=== Preseason All-American teams ===
	CBS	AP	TSN	USA; Today	SB; Nation	Blue; Ribbon	Athlon; Sports	Bleacher; Report	NBC; Sports	Sporting; News	BigTen.org	BTN	Sports; Illustrated	Lindy's; Sports
OG Anunoby							3rd		2nd	3rd				
Miles Bridges										2nd				
Thomas Bryant	3rd					1st	3rd		2nd					
Nigel Hayes	3rd					1st							2nd	
Melo Trimble	2nd					1st	2nd			1st				

=== Preseason polls ===
	AP	Coaches	CBS	NBC	Sporting; News	Sports; Illustrated	Blue Ribbon; Yearbook	Bleacher; Report	Athlon; Sports	Lindy's; Sports	ESPN	USBWA
Illinois												
Indiana	11	12	9	14	13	15	18	9	12		14	13
Iowa												
Maryland	25	21		25			24					
Michigan												
Michigan State	12	9	15	10	11		11	14	11	11	13	11
Minnesota												
Nebraska												
Northwestern												
Ohio State												
Penn State												
Purdue	15	15	20	15	10	11	9	14	14	12	21	14
Rutgers												
Wisconsin	9	10	11	11	8	8	6	7	10	6	12	8

== Regular season ==
=== 2016 ACC–Big Ten Challenge (ACC 9–5) ===
Date	Time	ACC team	B1G team	Score	Location	Television	Attendance	Challenge leader
Nov 28	7:00 pm	**Florida State**	Minnesota	75–67	Donald L. Tucker Civic Center • Tallahassee, Florida	ESPNU	5,993	ACC (1–0)
Nov 28	9:00 pm	Wake Forest	**Northwestern**	65–58	Welsh-Ryan Arena • Evanston, Illinois	ESPNU	6,386	Tied (1–1)
Nov 29	7:00 pm	**Pittsburgh**	Maryland	73–59	Xfinity Center • College Park, Maryland	ESPN2	17,144	ACC (2–1)
Nov 29	7:00 pm	Georgia Tech	**Penn State**	67–60	Bryce Jordan Center • University Park, Pennsylvania	ESPNU	6,032	Tied (2–2)
Nov 29	7:30 pm	No. 22 Syracuse	No. 17 **Wisconsin**	77–60	Kohl Center • Madison, Wisconsin	ESPN	17,287	B1G (3–2)
Nov 29	9:00 pm	**Notre Dame**	Iowa	92–78	Edmund P. Joyce Center • Notre Dame, Indiana	ESPN2	7,660	Tied (3–3)
Nov 29	9:00 pm	NC State	**Illinois**	88–74	State Farm Center • Champaign, Illinois	ESPNU	13,481	B1G (4–3)
Nov 29	9:30 pm	No. 5 **Duke**	Michigan State	78–69	Cameron Indoor Stadium • Durham, North Carolina	ESPN	9,314	Tied (4–4)
Nov 30	7:00 pm	No. 14 **Louisville**	No. 15 Purdue	71–64	KFC Yum! Center • Louisville, Kentucky	ESPN	21,841	ACC (5–4)
Nov 30	7:00 pm	**Virginia Tech**	Michigan	73–70	Crisler Center • Ann Arbor, Michigan	ESPN2	9,981	ACC (6–4)
Nov 30	7:00 pm	**Miami**	Rutgers	73–61	Watsco Center • Coral Gables, Florida	ESPNU	7,064	ACC (7–4)
Nov 30	9:00 pm	**Clemson**	Nebraska	60–58	Littlejohn Coliseum • Clemson, South Carolina	ESPNU	6,545	ACC (8–4)
Nov 30	9:00 pm	No. 6 **Virginia**	Ohio State	63–61	John Paul Jones Arena • Charlottesville, Virginia	ESPN2	14,566	ACC (9–4)
Nov 30	9:00 pm	No. 3 North Carolina	No. 13 **Indiana**	76–67	Simon Skjodt Assembly Hall • Bloomington, Indiana	ESPN	17,222	ACC (9–5)
**Winners are in bold** Game times in EST. Rankings from AP Poll (Nov 28). Boston College did not play due to the ACC having one more team than the B1G.

=== 2016 Gavitt Tipoff Games (Tied 4–4) ===
Date	Time	Big East team	Big Ten team	Score	Location	Television	Attendance	Leader
Mon., Nov. 14	7:00 PM	No. 3 **Villanova**	No. 15 Purdue	79–76	Mackey Arena • West Lafayette, IN	BTN	14,846	Big East (1–0)
Tue., Nov. 15	6:30 PM	Georgetown	**Maryland**	76–75	Verizon Center • Washington, D.C.	FS1	13,145	Tied (1–1)
Tue., Nov. 15	9:00 PM	No. 22 **Creighton**	No. 9 Wisconsin	79–67	CenturyLink Center • Omaha, NE	FS1	17,879	Big East (2–1)
Wed., Nov. 16	7:00 PM	**Butler**	Northwestern	70–68	Hinkle Fieldhouse • Indianapolis, IN	FS1	7,858	Big East (3–1)
Thu., Nov. 17	7:00 PM	Providence	**Ohio State**	72–67	Value City Arena • Columbus, OH	BTN	11,089	Big East (3–2)
Thu., Nov. 17	8:30 PM	DePaul	**Rutgers**	66–59	Allstate Arena • Rosemont, IL	FS1	4,057	Tied (3–3)
Thu., Nov. 17	9:00 PM	**Seton Hall**	Iowa	91–83	Carver–Hawkeye Arena • Iowa City, IA	BTN	10,391	Big East (4–3)
Fri., Nov. 18	9:00 PM	St. John's	**Minnesota**	92–86	Williams Arena • Minneapolis, MN	BTN	8,873	Tied (4–4)
**WINNERS ARE IN BOLD**. Game Times in EST. Rankings from AP Poll (Nov 14). Sources: Did not participate: Marquette, Xavier (Big East); Illinois, Indiana, Michigan, Michigan State, Nebraska, Penn State (Big Ten)

=== Rankings ===
Legend
	Improvement in ranking
	Drop in ranking
	Not ranked previous week
RV	Received votes but were not ranked in Top 25 of poll
(Italics)	Number of first place votes

		Pre/ Wk 1	Wk 2	Wk 3	Wk 4	Wk 5	Wk 6	Wk 7	Wk 8	Wk 9	Wk 10	Wk 11	Wk 12	Wk 13	Wk 14	Wk 15	Wk 16	Wk 17	Wk 18	Wk 19	Final
Illinois	AP																				
Illinois	C																				
Indiana	AP	11	6 (1)	3 (2)	13	9	9	16	16	25T	RV										
Indiana	C	12	5	5 (2)	10	9	9	16	16	25	RV	RV	RV	RV							
Iowa	AP																			RV	
Iowa	C																				
Maryland	AP	25	RV	RV	RV	RV	RV	RV	RV	RV	RV	25	22	17	21	23	24		25		
Maryland	C	21	24	23	22	RV	RV	RV	RV	RV	RV	25	23	17	22	24	24	RV	RV	RV	RV
Michigan	AP	RV		25T	RV												RV	RV	RV	23	
Michigan	C	RV	RV	24	RV		RV											RV	RV	RV	17
Michigan State	AP	12	13	24	RV	RV	RV											RV	RV		
Michigan State	C	9	13	20	RV	RV	RV	RV										RV			RV
Minnesota	AP				RV	RV	RV	RV	RV	RV	24						RV	RV	RV	RV	
Minnesota	C						RV	RV	RV	RV	24	RV						RV	RV	RV	
Nebraska	AP																				
Nebraska	C									RV											
Northwestern	AP							RV	RV	RV	RV	RV	RV	25	RV	RV	RV			RV	
Northwestern	C										RV	RV	RV	RV	RV	RV	RV	RV	RV	RV	RV
Ohio State	AP	RV	RV	RV	RV	RV	RV														
Ohio State	C	RV			RV	RV															
Penn State	AP																				
Penn State	C																				
Purdue	AP	15	15	17	15	18	15	15	15	20	17	21	20	23	16	16	14	16	13	15	
Purdue	C	15	15	19	16	19	16	15	15	20	19	22	20	24	18	16	14	16	12	15	15
Rutgers	AP			RV	RV																
Rutgers	C																				
Wisconsin	AP	9	9	16	17	17	14	14	14	13	18	17	15	10	7	9	16	22	24	25	
Wisconsin	C	10	11	14	17	17	14	14	14	11	17	17	15	9	5	10	15	21	23	22	16

=== Player of the week ===
Throughout the conference regular season, the Big Ten offices named one or two players of the week and one or two freshmen of the week each Monday.

Week	Player of the week	Freshman of the week
November 14, 2016	Malcolm Hill, ILL	Curtis Jones Jr., IND
November 14, 2016	James Blackmon Jr., IND	Miles Bridges, MSU
November 21, 2016	Peter Jok, IOWA	Amir Coffey, MINN
November 28, 2016	Melo Trimble, MD	Miles Bridges (2), MSU
November 28, 2016	Caleb Swanigan, PUR	Miles Bridges (2), MSU
December 5, 2016	Nigel Hayes, WIS	Nick Ward, MSU
December 12, 2016	Peter Jok (2), IOWA	Isaiah Moss, IOWA
December 19, 2016	Caleb Swanigan (2), PUR	Mike Watkins, PSU
December 26, 2016	Caleb Swanigan (3), PUR	Nick Ward (2), MSU
January 2, 2017	Nate Mason, MINN	Nick Ward (3), MSU
January 2, 2017	Tai Webster, NEB	Nick Ward (3), MSU
January 9, 2017	Caleb Swanigan (4), PUR	Amir Coffey (2), MINN
January 16, 2017	Scottie Lindsey, NW	Miles Bridges (3), MSU
January 16, 2017	Scottie Lindsey, NW	Mike Watkins (2), PSU
January 23, 2017	Ethan Happ, WIS	Justin Jackson, MD
January 23, 2017	James Blackmon Jr. (2), IND	Carsen Edwards, PUR
January 30, 2017	Ethan Happ (2), WIS	Miles Bridges (4), MSU
February 6, 2017	Caleb Swanigan (5), PUR	Jordan Bohannon, IOWA
February 13, 2017	Derrick Walton, Jr., MICH	Lamar Stevens, PSU
February 13, 2017	Jordan Murphy, MINN	Lamar Stevens, PSU
February 20, 2017	Melo Trimble (2), MD	Miles Bridges (5), MSU
February 27, 2017	Nick Ward, MSU	Nick Ward (4), MSU
March 6, 2017	Derrick Walton, Jr. (2), MICH	Jordan Bohannon (2), IOWA
March 6, 2017	Caleb Swanigan (6), PUR	Jordan Bohannon (2), IOWA

=== Conference matrix ===
This table summarizes the head-to-head results between teams in conference play. Each team played 18 conference games, and at least 1 against each opponent.

	Illinois	Indiana	Iowa	Maryland	Michigan	Michigan St	Minnesota	Nebraska	Northwestern	Ohio St	Penn St	Purdue	Rutgers	Wisconsin
vs. Illinois	–	1–0	0–2	2–0	1–1	0–1	1–0	0–1	0–2	0–1	2–0	1–0	1–0	1–0
vs. Indiana	0–1	–	1–0	1–0	2–0	0–1	1–0	1–0	1–1	0–1	0–2	2–0	0–1	2–0
vs. Iowa	2–0	0–1	–	1–1	0–1	1–0	1–0	1–1	1–0	0–1	0–1	1–1	0–2	0–1
vs. Maryland	0–2	0–1	1–1	–	0–1	0–1	1–1	1–0	0–1	0–2	1–0	1–0	0–2	1–0
vs. Michigan	1–1	0–2	1–0	1–0	–	1–1	1–0	0–2	1–0	1–0	0–1	0–1	0–1	1–1
vs. Michigan St	1–0	1–0	0–1	1–0	1–1	–	0–2	0–2	0–1	1–1	1–0	2–0	0–1	0–1
vs. Minnesota	0–1	0–1	0–1	1–1	0–1	2–0	–	0–1	0–1	1–1	1–1	0–1	0–1	2–0
vs. Nebraska	1–0	0–1	1–1	0–1	2–0	2–0	1–0	–	2–0	1–1	0–1	0–1	1–0	1–0
vs. Northwestern	2–0	1–1	0–1	1–0	0–1	1–0	1–0	0–2	–	0–1	0–1	2–0	0–2	0–1
vs. Ohio State	1–0	1–0	1–0	2–0	0–1	1–1	1–1	1–1	1–0	–	0–1	1–0	0–1	1–1
vs. Penn State	0–2	2–0	1–0	0–1	1–0	0–1	1–1	1–0	1–0	1–0	–	2–0	1–1	1–0
vs. Purdue	0–1	0–2	1–1	0–1	1–0	0–2	1–0	1–0	0–2	0–1	0–1	–	0–1	0–1
vs. Rutgers	0–1	1–0	2–0	2–0	1–0	1–0	1–0	0–1	2–0	1–0	1–1	1–0	–	2–0
vs. Wisconsin	0–1	0–2	1–0	0–1	1–1	1–0	0–2	0–1	1–0	1–1	0–1	1–0	0–2	–
Total	8–10	7–11	10–8	12–6	10–8	10–8	11–7	6–10	10–8	7–11	6–12	14–4	3–15	12–6

The Big Ten conference led the nation in attendance for the 41st consecutive season with an average of 12,235 per game. The margin over all other conferences was nearly 1000: ACC (11,257), SEC (11,080), Big 12 (10,427) and Big East (10,014). Of the 347 NCAA Division ! participants, several of the top average attendances were posted by Big Ten teams Wisconsin (6th, 17,286), Maryland (7th, 16,628), Indiana (9th, 16,363), Nebraska (11th, 15,427), Michigan State (13th, 14,797), Purdue (18th, 13,819) and Iowa (23rd, 12,547).

== Honors and awards ==
Caleb Swanigan was a unanimous first team All-American selection by Associated Press, USBWA, NABC and Sporting News. Ethan Happ was a third team selection by all but the NABC.

=== All-Big Ten awards and teams ===
On March 6, the Big Ten announced most of its conference awards.

Honor	Coaches	Media
Player of the Year	Caleb Swanigan, Purdue	Caleb Swanigan, Purdue
Coach of the Year	Richard Pitino, Minnesota	Richard Pitino, Minnesota
Freshman of the Year	Miles Bridges, Michigan State	Miles Bridges, Michigan State
Defensive Player of the Year	Reggie Lynch, Minnesota	Not Selected
Sixth Man of the Year	Nicholas Baer, Iowa	Not Selected
All-Big Ten First Team	Peter Jok, Iowa	Peter Jok, Iowa
All-Big Ten First Team	Melo Trimble, Maryland	Melo Trimble, Maryland
All-Big Ten First Team	Nate Mason, Minnesota	Nate Mason, Minnesota
All-Big Ten First Team	Caleb Swanigan, Purdue	Caleb Swanigan, Purdue
All-Big Ten First Team	Ethan Happ, Wisconsin	Ethan Happ, Wisconsin
All-Big Ten Second Team	Malcolm Hill, Illinois	Malcolm Hill, Illinois
All-Big Ten Second Team	Derrick Walton Jr., Michigan	Derrick Walton Jr., Michigan
All-Big Ten Second Team	Miles Bridges, Michigan State	Miles Bridges, Michigan State
All-Big Ten Second Team	Bryant McIntosh, Northwestern	Bryant McIntosh, Northwestern
All-Big Ten Second Team	Bronson Koenig, Wisconsin	Tai Webster, Nebraska
All-Big Ten Third Team	Tai Webster, Nebraska	Bronson Koenig, Wisconsin
All-Big Ten Third Team	Thomas Bryant, Indiana	Thomas Bryant, Indiana
All-Big Ten Third Team	Jordan Murphy, Minnesota	Jordan Murphy, Minnesota
All-Big Ten Third Team	Nigel Hayes, Wisconsin	Nigel Hayes, Wisconsin
All-Big Ten Third Team	Scottie Lindsey, Northwestern	Vincent Edwards, Purdue
All-Big Ten Third Team	Not Selected	James Blackmon Jr., Indiana
All-Big Ten Honorable Mention	Vincent Edwards, Purdue	Scottie Lindsey, Northwestern
All-Big Ten Honorable Mention	James Blackmon Jr., Indiana	Not Selected
All-Big Ten Honorable Mention	Moritz Wagner, Michigan	Moritz Wagner, Michigan
All-Big Ten Honorable Mention	Nick Ward, Michigan State	Nick Ward, Michigan State
All-Big Ten Honorable Mention	Jae'Sean Tate, Ohio State	Jae'Sean Tate, Ohio State
All-Big Ten Honorable Mention	Isaac Haas, Purdue	Isaac Haas, Purdue
All-Big Ten Honorable Mention	Corey Sanders, Rutgers	Corey Sanders, Rutgers
All-Big Ten Honorable Mention	Dakota Mathias, Purdue	Dakota Mathias, Purdue
All-Big Ten Honorable Mention	Not Selected	Trevor Thompson, Ohio State
All-Big Ten Honorable Mention	Not Selected	Tony Carr, Penn State
All-Big Ten Honorable Mention	Not Selected	Zak Irvin, Michigan
All-Freshman Team	Jordan Bohannon, Iowa	Not Selected
All-Freshman Team	Tyler Cook, Iowa	Not Selected
All-Freshman Team	Miles Bridges, Michigan State	Not Selected
All-Freshman Team	Amir Coffey, Minnesota	Not Selected
All-Freshman Team	Tony Carr, Penn State	Not Selected
All-Defensive Team	Reggie Lynch, Minnesota	Not Selected
All-Defensive Team	Vic Law, Northwestern	Not Selected
All-Defensive Team	Dakota Mathias, Purdue	Not Selected
All-Defensive Team	Ethan Happ, Wisconsin	Not Selected
All-Defensive Team	Zak Showalter, Wisconsin	Not Selected

=== AP All-Big Ten awards and teams ===
Honor	Winner
Player of the Year	Caleb Swanigan, Purdue*
Coach of the Year	Richard Pitino, Minnesota
Newcomer of the Year	Miles Bridges, Michigan State*
Defensive Player of the Year	Ethan Happ, Wisconsin
All Big Ten First Team	Nate Mason, Minnesota
All Big Ten First Team	Melo Trimble, Maryland
All Big Ten First Team	Peter Jok, Iowa
All Big Ten First Team	Caleb Swanigan, Purdue*
All Big Ten First Team	Ethan Happ, Wisconsin
All Big Ten Second Team	Derrick Walton Jr., Michigan
All Big Ten Second Team	Bryant McIntosh, Northwestern
All Big Ten Second Team	Malcolm Hill, Illinois
All Big Ten Second Team	Miles Bridges, Michigan State
All Big Ten Second Team	Jordan Murphy, Minnesota
Source *unanimous selection

=== USBWA ===
On March 7, the U.S. Basketball Writers Association released its 2016–17 Men's All-District Teams, based upon voting from its national membership. There were nine regions from coast to coast, and a player and coach of the year were selected in each. The following lists all the Big Ten representatives selected within their respective regions.

District II (NY, NJ, DE, DC, PA, WV)
- none
District III (VA, NC, SC, MD)
- Melo Trimble, Maryland
District V (OH, IN, IL, MI, MN, WI)

Player of the Year

- Caleb Swanigan, Purdue

Coach of the Year

- Matt Painter, Purdue

All-District Team

- Miles Bridges, Michigan State
- Ethan Happ, Wisconsin
- Malcolm Hill, Illinois
- Nate Mason, Minnesota
- Bryant McIntosh, Northwestern
- Caleb Swanigan, Purdue
- Derrick Walton Jr., Michigan
District VI (IA, MO, KS, OK, NE, ND, SD)
- Peter Jok, Iowa
- Tai Webster, Nebraska

=== NABC ===
The National Association of Basketball Coaches announced their Division I All-District teams on March 22, recognizing the nation's best men's collegiate basketball student-athletes. Selected and voted on by member coaches of the NABC, the selections on this list were then eligible for NABC Coaches' All-America Honors. The following list represented the District 7 players chosen to the list.

First Team

- Melo Trimble, Maryland
- Caleb Swanigan, Purdue
- Ethan Happ, Wisconsin
- Peter Jok, Iowa
- Miles Bridges, Michigan State

Second Team

- Nate Mason, Minnesota
- Derrick Walton, Jr., Michigan
- Bryant McIntosh, Northwestern
- Tai Webster, Nebraska
- Nigel Hayes, Wisconsin

=== Other awards ===
Nicolas Baer, Zak Irvin, Sanjay Lumpkin, Keita Bates-Diop, Payton Banks, Isaac Haas and Vitto Brown were nominees for the Allstate Good Works Team in honor of their volunteerism and civic involvement. On January 6, 2017, Malcolm Hill, Peter Jok, Derrick Walton, Nigel Hayes and Bronson Koenig were included on the 30-man Senior CLASS Award candidate list. Melo Trimble was the only returning selection among the January 11 Wooden Award top 25. He was joined by Ethan Happ, Nigel Hayes and Caleb Swanigan. Happ and Swanigan were on the Robertson midseason 19-man watchlist. Trimble was named to the Cousy Award Final 10 on January 30. Swanigan and Miles Bridges were named Malone Award top 10 finalists on February 2. Happ was named as a Jabbar Award top 10 finalist the following day. Swanigan, Trimble and Happ were named to both the February 9 Wooden Top 20 and the February 9 Naismith Top 30 lists. Swanigan and Moritz Wagner were named to the February 9, 2016–17 NCAA Division I Academic All-District Men's Basketball Team for District 5 (IL, IN, MI, OH), placing them among the 40 finalists for the Academic All-American 15-man team. Hayes and Jok were named to the 10-man Senior CLASS Award finalist list. Swanigan was named a second team Academic All-America selection on March 2.

== Postseason ==
=== Big Ten tournament ===
First round Wednesday, March 8 ESPN2/BTN
12	Nebraska	67
13	Penn State	76*
11	Ohio State	57
14	Rutgers	66

Second round Thursday, March 9 ESPN2/BTN
8	Michigan	75
9	Illinois	55
5	Michigan State	78
13	Penn State	51
7	Iowa	73
10	Indiana	95
6	Northwestern	83
14	Rutgers	61

Quarterfinals; Friday, March 10; ESPN/BTN
1	Purdue	70
8	Michigan	74*
4	Minnesota	63
5	Michigan State	58
2	Wisconsin	70
10	Indiana	60
3	Maryland	64
6	Northwestern	72

Semifinals; Saturday, March 11; CBS
8	Michigan	84
4	Minnesota	77
2	Wisconsin	76
6	Northwestern	48

Championship; Sunday, March 12; CBS
8	Michigan	71
2	Wisconsin	56

* denotes overtime period

=== NCAA tournament ===
The winner of the Big Ten tournament, Michigan, received the conference's automatic bid to the 2017 NCAA Division I men's basketball tournament. Six other conference school received at-large bids to the Tournament: Purdue, Minnesota, Maryland, Northwestern, Wisconsin, and Michigan State.

Seed	Region	School	First Four	First round	Second round	Sweet Sixteen	Elite Eight	Final Four	Championship
4	Midwest	Purdue	N/A	defeated (13) Vermont 80–70	defeated (5) Iowa State 80–76	eliminated by (1) Kansas 66–98			
5	South	Minnesota	N/A	eliminated by (12) Middle Tennessee 72–81					
6	West	Maryland	N/A	eliminated by (11) Xavier 65–76					
7	Midwest	Michigan	N/A	defeated (10) Oklahoma State 92–91	defeated (2) Louisville 73–69	eliminated by (3) Oregon 68–69			
8	West	Northwestern	N/A	defeated (9) Vanderbilt 68–66	eliminated by (1) Gonzaga 73–79				
8	East	Wisconsin	N/A	defeated (9) Virginia Tech 84–74	defeated (1) Villanova 65–62	eliminated by (4) Florida 83–84^{OT}			
9	Midwest	Michigan State	N/A	defeated (8) Miami 78–58	eliminated by (1) Kansas 70–90				
		W–L (%):	0–0 (–)	5–2 (.714)	3–2 (.600)	0–3 (.000)	0–0 (–)	0–0 (–)	0–0 (–) Total: 8–7 (.533)

=== National Invitation tournament ===
Three Big Ten teams received invitations to the National Invitation Tournament: Iowa, Illinois, and Indiana.

Seed	Bracket	School	First round	Second round	Quarterfinals	Semifinals	Finals
1	Iowa	Iowa	defeated South Dakota 87–75	eliminated by TCU 92–94			
2	Illinois St.	Illinois	defeated Valparaiso 82–57	defeated Boise State 71–56	eliminated by UCF 58–68		
3	Syracuse	Indiana	eliminated by Georgia Tech 63–75				
		W–L (%):	2–1 (.667)	1–1 (.500)	0–1 (.000)	0–0 (–)	0–0 (–) Total: 3–3 (.500)

=== 2017 NBA draft ===
The following all-conference selections were listed as seniors or graduate students: Peter Jok, Malcolm Hill, Derrick Walton, Bronson Koenig, Tai Webster, and Nigel Hayes. The following players were invited to the NBA Draft Combine: OG Anunoby, Thomas Bryant, Justin Jackson, Caleb Swanigan, Melo Trimble, Moritz Wagner, and D. J. Wilson, while Derrick Walton was named as an alternate. Eventually, Walton, Jok and Hayes accepted invitations as alternates. Wilson (17th), Anunoby (23rd), Swanigan (26th) and Bryant (42nd) were selected in the draft.

Rnd.	Pick	Player	Pos.	Team	School
1	17	D. J. Wilson	PF	Milwaukee Bucks	Michigan (Jr.)
1	23	OG Anunoby	SG	Toronto Raptors (from L.A. Clippers via Milwaukee) (Note: August 26, 2014:Los Angeles Clippers to Milwaukee Bucks: Los Angeles Clippers acquired Carlos Delfino, Miroslav Raduljica, and a 2015 second-round pick; Milwaukee acquired Jared Dudley and the Clippers' protected 2017 first-round pick; June 25, 2015: Milwaukee Bucks to Toronto Raptors: Milwaukee acquired Greivis Vásquez; Toronto acquired rights to Norman Powell and the Los Angeles Clippers' 2017 first-round pick)	Indiana (So.)
1	26	Caleb Swanigan	PF	Portland Trail Blazers (from Cleveland) (Note: February 18, 2016: Cleveland Cavaliers to Portland Trail Blazers: Cleveland acquired a future second-round pick (2018); Portland acquired Anderson Varejão and a future first-round pick; January 6, 2017: Cleveland Cavaliers to Portland Trail Blazers: Cleveland reacquired its own 2018 first-round pick; Portland acquired a first-round pick)	Purdue (So.)
2	42	Thomas Bryant	PF	Utah Jazz (from Detroit, (Note: February 19, 2015: Detroit Pistons to Utah Jazz (three-team trade with Oklahoma City Thunder): Detroit acquired Reggie Jackson from Oklahoma City; Oklahoma City acquired Enes Kanter and Steve Novak from Utah; D. J. Augustin and Kyle Singler from Detroit, and Detroit's 2019 second-round pick; Utah acquired Kendrick Perkins, Grant Jerrett and draft rights to Tibor Pleiß from Oklahoma City, Oklahoma City's protected first-round pick (conveyance minimum of two years after first-round pick sent to Philadelphia, which happened in 2016), and Detroit's 2017 second-round pick) traded to Los Angeles Lakers) (Note: June 22, 2017: Los Angeles Lakers to Utah Jazz: Utah acquired Los Angeles' first-round pick (No. 28); Los Angeles Lakers acquired Utah's first-round pick (No. 30) and second-round pick (No. 42))	Indiana (So.)

==== Pre-draft trades ====
Prior to the day of the draft, the following trades were made and resulted in exchanges of draft picks between the teams.

==== Draft-day trades ====
Draft-day trades occurred on June 22, 2017, the day of the draft.
