= 2016–17 Maryland Terrapins men's basketball team =

American college basketball season

2016–17 Maryland Terrapins men's basketball
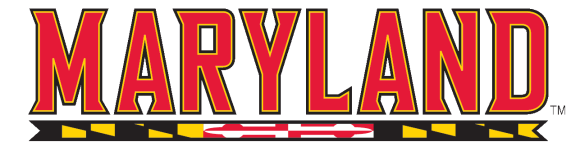

Barclays Center Classic champions

NCAA tournament, First Round
- Conference: Big Ten Conference
- Record: 24–9 (12–6 Big Ten)
- Head coach: Mark Turgeon (6th season)
- Assistant coaches: Dustin Clark; Bino Ranson; Cliff Warren
- Home arena: Xfinity Center

2016–17 Big Ten Conference men's basketball standings
	Conf.				Overall
Team	W		L	PCT	W		L	PCT
No. 15 Purdue	14	–	4	.778	27	–	8	.771
No. 25 Wisconsin	12	–	6	.667	27	–	10	.730
Maryland	12	–	6	.667	24	–	9	.727
Minnesota	11	–	7	.611	24	–	10	.706
No. 23 Michigan †	10	–	8	.556	26	–	12	.684
Northwestern	10	–	8	.556	24	–	12	.667
Michigan State	10	–	8	.556	20	–	15	.571
Iowa	10	–	8	.556	19	–	15	.559
Illinois	8	–	10	.444	20	–	15	.571
Ohio State	7	–	11	.389	17	–	15	.531
Indiana	7	–	11	.389	18	–	16	.529
Penn State	6	–	12	.333	15	–	18	.455
Nebraska	6	–	12	.333	12	–	19	.387
Rutgers	3	–	15	.167	15	–	18	.455
† 2017 Big Ten tournament winner Rankings from AP poll

The 2016–17 Maryland Terrapins men's basketball team represented the University of Maryland, College Park in the 2016–17 NCAA Division I men's basketball season. They were led by sixth-year head coach Mark Turgeon and played their home games at Xfinity Center in College Park, Maryland as members of the Big Ten Conference.

They finished the season 24–9, 12–6 in Big Ten play to finish in a tie for second place. As the No. 3 seed in the Big Ten tournament, they lost to Northwestern in the quarterfinals. They received an at-large bid to the NCAA tournament. As a No. 6 seed in the West region, they lost in the first round to Xavier.

== Previous season ==
The Terrapins finished the 2015–16 season with a record of 27–9, 12–6 in Big Ten play to finish in a four-way tie for third place in conference. They defeated Nebraska in the quarterfinals of the Big Ten tournament to advance to the semifinals where they lost to Michigan State. They received an at-large bid to the NCAA tournament where they defeated South Dakota State and Hawaii to advance to the Sweet Sixteen. In the Sweet Sixteen, they lost to Kansas.

== Departures ==
Name	Number	Pos.	Height	Weight	Year	Hometown	Notes
Rasheed Sulaimon	0	G	6'5"	195	Senior	Houston, TX	Graduated
Robert Carter	4	F	6'8"	250	RS Junior	Thomasville, GA	Declare for 2016 NBA draft
Jake Layman	10	F	6'9"	190	Senior	Wrentham, MA	Graduated
Trevor Anzmann	12	G	5'11"	175	Senior	Westminster, MD	Walk-on; graduated
Varun Ram	21	G	5'9"	150	RS Senior	Clarksville, MD	Walk-on; graduated
Diamond Stone	33	C	6'11"	250	Freshman	Milwaukee, WI	Declare for 2016 NBA draft

=== Incoming transfers ===
Name	Number	Pos.	Height	Weight	Year	Hometown	Previous school
L. G. Gill	10	F	6'8"	220	Senior	Chesterfield, VA	Transferred from Duquesne. Will be eligible to play since Gill graduated from Duquesne.

== 2016 Recruiting Class ==
College recruiting
Name	Hometown	School	Height	Weight	Commit date
Anthony Cowan Jr. PG	Bowie, MD	St. John's College High School	6 ft 0 in (1.83 m)	170 lb (77 kg)	Nov 20, 2015
Anthony Cowan Jr. PG	Recruit ratings: Scout: Rivals: 247Sports: ESPN:				
Micah Thomas; SF	Eads, TN	Huntington Prep School	6 ft 7 in (2.01 m)	185 lb (84 kg)	Nov 20, 2015
Micah Thomas; SF	Recruit ratings: Scout: Rivals: 247Sports: ESPN:				
Kevin Huerter; SG	Clifton Park, NY	Shenendehowa High School	6 ft 5 in (1.96 m)	175 lb (79 kg)	Nov 20, 2015
Kevin Huerter; SG	Recruit ratings: Scout: Rivals: 247Sports: ESPN:				
Justin Jackson; SF	Toronto, ON, Canada	Findlay College Preparatory School	6 ft 8 in (2.03 m)	225 lb (102 kg)	May 27, 2016
Justin Jackson; SF	Recruit ratings: Scout: Rivals: 247Sports: ESPN:				
Joshua Tomaic; PF	Canary Islands	Findlay College Preparatory School	6 ft 9 in (2.06 m)	210 lb (95 kg)	Jun 1, 2016
Joshua Tomaic; PF	Recruit ratings: No ratings found				
Overall recruit ranking:
Note: In many cases, Scout, Rivals, 247Sports, On3, and ESPN may conflict in their listings of height and weight.; In these cases, the average was taken. ESPN grades are on a 100-point scale.; Sources: "2016 Team Ranking". Rivals.

=== 2017 Recruiting Class ===
College recruiting (2017)
Name	Hometown	School	Height	Weight	Commit date
Bruno Fernando; C	Bradenton, FL	IMG Academy	6 ft 10 in (2.08 m)	225 lb (102 kg)	Oct 2, 2016
Bruno Fernando; C	Recruit ratings: Scout: Rivals: 247Sports: ESPN:				
Darryl Morsell; SG	Baltimore, MD	Mount Saint Joseph High School	6 ft 4 in (1.93 m)	200 lb (91 kg)	Nov 2, 2016
Darryl Morsell; SG	Recruit ratings: Scout: Rivals: 247Sports: ESPN:				
Overall recruit ranking: Scout: NR Rivals: NR ESPN: NR
Note: In many cases, Scout, Rivals, 247Sports, On3, and ESPN may conflict in their listings of height and weight.; In these cases, the average was taken. ESPN grades are on a 100-point scale.; Sources:

== Roster ==
2016–17 Maryland Terrapins men's basketball team
Players
Coaches

Pos.	#	Name	Height	Weight	Year	Previous school	Hometown
G	0	Anthony Cowan Jr.	6 ft 0 in (1.83 m)	170 lb (77 kg)	Fr	St. John's College High School	Bowie, Maryland
G	1	Jaylen Brantley	5 ft 11 in (1.8 m)	170 lb (77 kg)	Jr	Odessa College	Springfield, Massachusetts
G	2	Melo Trimble	6 ft 3 in (1.91 m)	185 lb (84 kg)	Jr	Bishop Denis J. O'Connell High School	Upper Marlboro, Maryland
G	4	Kevin Huerter	6 ft 7 in (2.01 m)	190 lb (86 kg)	Fr	Shenendehowa High School	Clifton Park, New York
G	5	Dion Wiley	6 ft 4 in (1.93 m)	210 lb (95 kg)	RS So	Potomac High School (MD)	Oxon Hill, Maryland
F	10	L. G. Gill	6 ft 8 in (2.03 m)	230 lb (104 kg)	Sr	Duquesne	Chesterfield, Virginia
G/F	11	Jared Nickens	6 ft 7 in (2.01 m)	205 lb (93 kg)	Jr	Westtown School	Monmouth Junction, New Jersey
F	13	Ivan Bender	6 ft 9 in (2.06 m)	235 lb (107 kg)	So	Elektrotehnička Škola Tuzla	Čapljina, Bosnia and Herzegovina
F	15	Michal Čekovský	7 ft 1 in (2.16 m)	250 lb (113 kg)	Jr	Canarias Basketball Academy	Košice, Slovakia
G	20	Travis Valmon (W)	6 ft 1 in (1.85 m)	175 lb (79 kg)	Fr	Georgetown Prep	Rockville, Maryland
F	21	Justin Jackson	6 ft 7 in (2.01 m)	225 lb (102 kg)	Fr	Hill Academy	East York, Ontario, Canada
F	23	Micah Thomas	6 ft 7 in (2.01 m)	195 lb (88 kg)	Fr	Huntington Prep	Memphis, Tennessee
G	24	Andrew Terrell (W)	5 ft 10 in (1.78 m)	190 lb (86 kg)	So	Brebeuf Jesuit Prep	Indianapolis, Indiana
G	32	Kent Auslander (W)	6 ft 6 in (1.98 m)	200 lb (91 kg)	So	Herndon High School	Herndon, Virginia
F	33	Joshua Tomaic	6 ft 9 in (2.06 m)	220 lb (100 kg)	Fr	Canarias Basketball Academy	Lanzarote, Canary Islands
F	35	Damonte Dodd	6 ft 11 in (2.11 m)	250 lb (113 kg)	Sr	Massanutten Military Academy	Centreville, Maryland

Head coach

- Mark Turgeon (Kansas)

Assistant coach(es)

- Dustin Clark (Texas A&M)
- Bino Ranson (SNHU)
- Cliff Warren (Mount St. Mary's)

Legend

- (C) Team captain
- (S) Suspended
- (I) Ineligible
- (W) Walk-on
- Injured
- Current redshirt

Roster

=== Depth chart ===
Pos.	Starting 5	Bench 1	Bench 2
C	Damonte Dodd	Michal Čekovský
PF	Justin Jackson	L. G. Gill	Ivan Bender
SF	Kevin Huerter	Jared Nickens	Joshua Tomaic
SG	Melo Trimble	Dion Wiley	Micah Thomas
PG	Anthony Cowan	Jaylen Brantley

== Schedule and results ==
Date time, TV	Rank^{#}	Opponent^{#}	Result	Record	High points	High rebounds	High assists	Site (attendance) city, state
Exhibition
Nov 5, 2016*; 2:00 pm, BTN+	No. 25	Catawba	W 95–61		17 – Nickens	10 – Dodd	6 – Huerter	Xfinity Center; College Park, MD
Non-conference regular season
Nov 11, 2016*; 7:00 pm, BTN	No. 25	American	W 62–56	1–0	21 – Trimble	9 – 2 Tied	4 – Trimble	Xfinity Center (17,078); College Park, MD
Nov 15, 2016*; 6:30 pm, FS1		at Georgetown; Gavitt Tipoff Games	W 76–75	2–0	22 – Trimble	7 – Huerter	4 – Cowan	Verizon Center (13,145); Washington, D.C.
Nov 17, 2016*; 7:00 pm, ESPN3		St. Mary's College	W 93–45	3–0	15 – Gill	10 – 2 Tied	7 – Cowan	Xfinity Center (15,779); College Park, MD
Nov 20, 2016*; 2:00 pm, ESPN3		Towson; Barclays Center Classic	W 71–66	4–0	27 – Trimble	6 – Trimble	4 – Trimble	Xfinity Center (16,797); College Park, MD
Nov 22, 2016*; 7:00 pm, BTN		Stony Brook; Barclays Center Classic	W 77–63	5–0	21 – Trimble	9 – Jackson	2 – 5 Tied	Xfinity Center (14,950); College Park, MD
Nov 25, 2016*; 9:30 pm, ASN		vs. Richmond; Barclays Center Classic semifinals	W 88–82 ^{OT}	6–0	29 – Trimble	10 – Huerter	4 – Cowan	Barclays Center (–); Brooklyn, NY
Nov 26, 2016*; 9:30 pm, ASN		vs. Kansas State; Barclays Center Classic championship	W 69–68	7–0	18 – Trimble	8 – Cekovsky	3 – 2 Tied	Barclays Center (5,011); Brooklyn, NY
Nov 29, 2016*; 7:00 pm, ESPN2		Pittsburgh; ACC–Big Ten Challenge	L 59–73	7–1	13 – Trimble	9 – Huerter	5 – Trimble	Xfinity Center (17,144); College Park, MD
Dec 3, 2016*; 9:00 pm, BTN		Oklahoma State	W 71–70	8–1	13 – Trimble	8 – Dodd	6 – Trimble	Xfinity Center (17,391); College Park, MD
Dec 7, 2016*; 9:00 pm, ESPNU		Howard	W 79–56	9–1	16 – Cekovsky	7 – 2 Tied	4 – 3 Tied	Xfinity Center (15,584); College Park, MD
Dec 10, 2016*; 12:00 pm, BTN		Saint Peter's	W 66–56	10–1	19 – Jackson	5 – 2 Tied	4 – Trimble	Xfinity Center (14,859); College Park, MD
Dec 12, 2016*; 7:00 pm, ESPNU		Jacksonville State	W 92–66	11–1	23 – Trimble	6 – Jackson	5 – Cowan	Xfinity Center (13,646); College Park, MD
Dec 20, 2016*; 7:00 pm, ESPN2		vs. Charlotte; Baltimore Showcase	W 88–72	12–1	21 – Trimble	6 – Cekovsky	5 – Cowan	Royal Farms Arena (7,139); Baltimore, MD
Big Ten Regular Season
Dec 27, 2016; 5:00 pm, ESPN2		Illinois	W 84–59	13–1 (1–0)	20 – Trimble	7 – Gill	6 – Cowan	Xfinity Center (17,950); College Park, MD
Jan 1, 2017; 12:00 pm, BTN		Nebraska	L 65–67	13–2 (1–1)	26 – Huerter	7 – Jackson	3 – Huerter	Xfinity Center (15,067); College Park, MD
Jan 7, 2017; 3:15 pm, ESPN2		at Michigan	W 77–70	14–2 (2–1)	15 – 2 Tied	6 – 2 Tied	4 – 2 Tied	Crisler Center (11,527); Ann Arbor, MI
Jan 10, 2017; 9:00 pm, ESPN		Indiana	W 75–72	15–2 (3–1)	18 – Trimble	7 – Huerter	3 – Trimble	Xfinity Center (17,213); College Park, MD
Jan 14, 2017; 6:00 pm, ESPN2		at Illinois	W 62–56	16–2 (4–1)	19 – Cowan	7 – Cowan	5 – Trimble	State Farm Center (14,002); Champaign, IL
Jan 19, 2017; 7:00 pm, ESPN	No. 25	at Iowa	W 84–76	17–2 (5–1)	20 – Trimble	8 – 2 Tied	5 – 2 Tied	Carver–Hawkeye Arena (11,040); Iowa City, IA
Jan 24, 2017; 7:00 pm, BTN	No. 22	Rutgers	W 67–55	18–2 (6–1)	17 – Trimble	8 – Huerter	6 – Huerter	Xfinity Center (17,950); College Park, MD
Jan 28, 2017; 2:15 pm, BTN	No. 22	at Minnesota	W 85–78	19–2 (7–1)	28 – Jackson	10 – Jackson	7 – Trimble	Williams Arena (11,191); Minneapolis, MN
Jan 31, 2017; 7:00 pm, ESPN	No. 17	at Ohio State	W 77–71	20–2 (8–1)	22 – Jackson	12 – Jackson	5 – Cowan	Value City Arena (12,887); Columbus, OH
Feb 4, 2017; 12:00 pm, ESPN	No. 17	No. 23 Purdue	L 72–73	20–3 (8–2)	22 – Trimble	5 – 2 Tied	5 – Trimble	Xfinity Center (17,950); College Park, MD
Feb 7, 2017; 7:00 pm, BTN	No. 21	at Penn State	L 64–70	20–4 (8–3)	14 – Jackson	8 – Jackson	5 – Huerter	Bryce Jordan Center (7,063); University Park, PA
Feb 11, 2017; 4:00 pm, ESPN	No. 21	Ohio State	W 86–77	21–4 (9–3)	19 – Cowan	7 – Jackson	4 – 2 Tied	Xfinity Center (17,950); College Park, MD
Feb 15, 2017; 7:00 pm, BTN	No. 23	at Northwestern	W 74–64	22–4 (10–3)	32 – Trimble	8 – Huerter	6 – Cowan	Welsh-Ryan Arena (7,707); Evanston, IL
Feb 19, 2017; 1:00 pm, CBS	No. 23	at No. 11 Wisconsin	L 60–71	22–5 (10–4)	27 – Trimble	5 – 2 Tied	4 – Cowan	Kohl Center (17,287); Madison, WI
Feb 22, 2017; 8:30 pm, BTN	No. 24	Minnesota	L 75–89	22–6 (10–5)	15 – Bender	7 – Jackson	6 – Trimble	Xfinity Center (17,349); College Park, MD
Feb 25, 2017; 6:00 pm, ESPN2	No. 24	Iowa	L 69–83	22–7 (10–6)	13 – Huerter	6 – 2 Tied	5 – Huerter	Xfinity Center (17,615); College Park, MD
Feb 28, 2017; 6:30 pm, BTN		at Rutgers	W 79–59	23–7 (11–6)	11 – Trimble	8 – Jackson	7 – Trimble	Louis Brown Athletic Center (6,017); Piscataway, NJ
Mar 4, 2017; 2:00 pm, BTN		Michigan State	W 63–60	24–7 (12–6)	16 – Trimble	6 – 3 Tied	5 – Cowan	Xfinity Center (17,950); College Park, MD
Big Ten tournament
Mar 10, 2017; 9:00 pm, BTN	(3) No. 25	vs. (6) Northwestern; Quarterfinals	L 64–72	24–8	20 – Trimble	6 – Trimble	4 – Trimble	Verizon Center (15,624); Washington, D.C.
NCAA tournament
Mar 16, 2017*; 6:50 pm, TNT	(6 W)	vs. (11 W) Xavier; First Round	L 65–76	24–9	19 – Huerter	4 – Cowan, Huerter	5 – Cowan, Huerter	Amway Center (15,869); Orlando, FL
*Non-conference game. ^{#}Rankings from AP Poll. (#) Tournament seedings in parentheses. W=West Region. All times are in Eastern.

== Rankings ==
Ranking movements Legend: ██ Increase in ranking ██ Decrease in ranking — = Not ranked RV = Received votes
	Week																			
Poll	Pre	1	2	3	4	5	6	7	8	9	10	11	12	13	14	15	16	17	18	Final
AP	25	RV	RV	RV	RV	RV	RV	RV	RV	RV	25	22	17	21	23	24	RV	25	—	Not released
Coaches	21	24	23	22	RV	RV	RV	RV	RV	RV	25	23	17	22	24	24	RV	RV	RV	

== See also ==
- 2016–17 Maryland Terrapins women's basketball team
