= Peter Jok =

South Sudanese basketball player (born 1994)

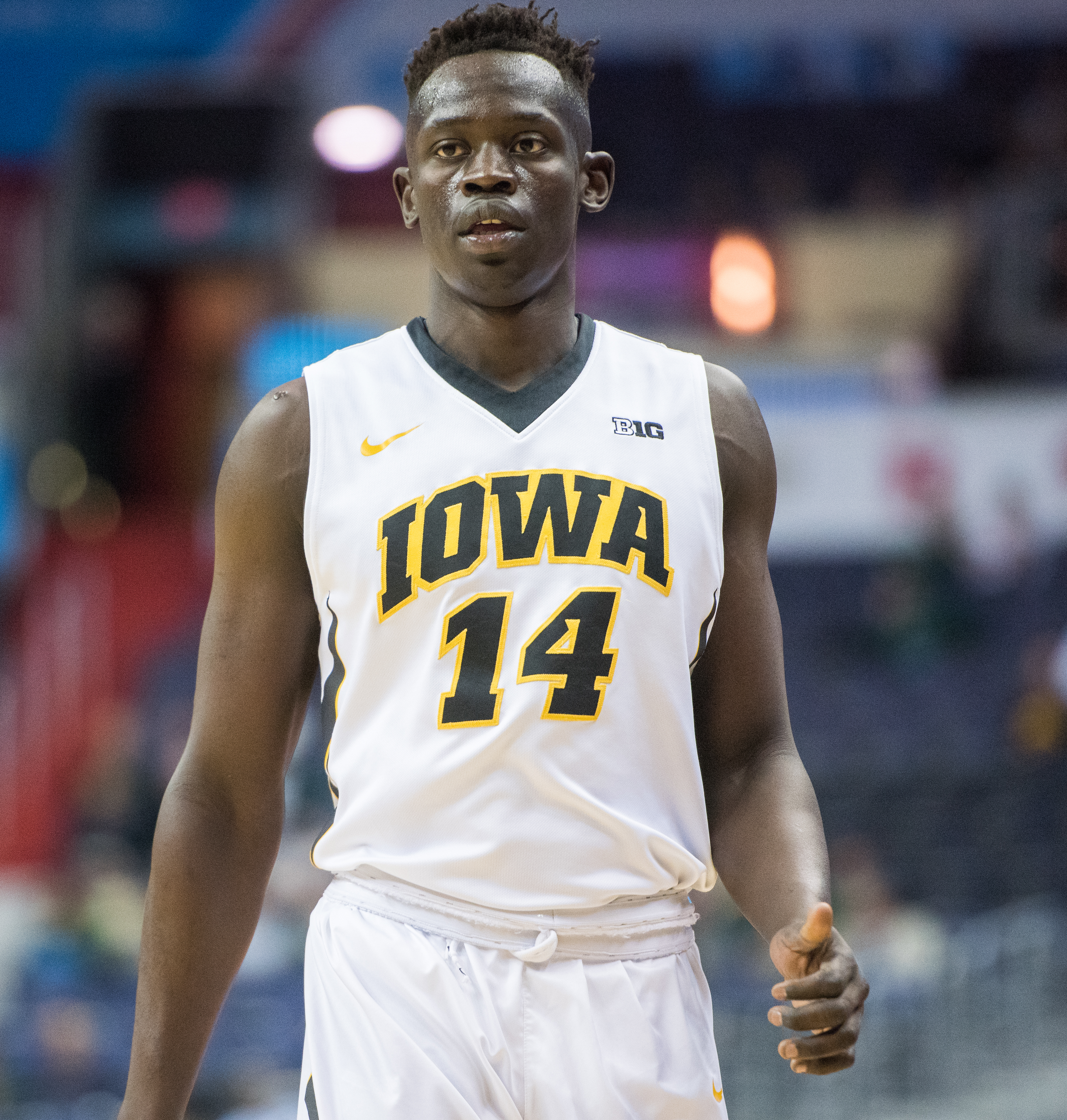
- Jok with the Iowa Hawkeyes in 2017

Petro de Luanda
- Position: Shooting guard / small forward
- League: BAL

Personal information
- Born: 30 March 1994 (age 32) Rumbek, Sudan
- Listed height: 6 ft 6 in (1.98 m)
- Listed weight: 205 lb (93 kg)

Career information
- High school: Roosevelt (Des Moines, Iowa); Valley (West Des Moines, Iowa)
- College: Iowa (2013–2017)
- NBA draft: 2017: undrafted
- Playing career: 2017–present

Career history
- 2017–2019: Northern Arizona Suns
- 2019–2020: Cholet Basket
- 2020–2021: UCAM Murcia CB
- 2021–2022: Cholet Basket
- 2023: Hermine Nantes
- 2023–2024: Sioux Falls Skyforce
- 2024: Ottawa BlackJacks
- 2024–2026: Cibona
- 2026–present: Petro de Luanda

Career highlights
- First-team All-Big Ten (2017); Second-team All-Big Ten (2016); First-team Parade All-American (2013); Iowa Mr. Basketball (2013)
- Stats at Basketball Reference

Kacoul Dut "Peter" Jok (born 30 March 1994) is a South Sudanese professional basketball player for Petro de Luanda of the Basketball Africa League (BAL). He played college basketball for the University of Iowa of the Big Ten Conference. A 6-foot-6-inch (1.98 m) swingman, Jok originates from Rumbek. Jok represented the South Sudan national team in the 2023 FIBA World Cup and the 2024 Summer Olympics.

== Early life ==
Jok was born and spent his childhood living in Rumbek, Sudan. When Jok was three years old, his father died as a general for the Sudan People's Liberation Army during the Second Sudanese Civil War. Jok's grandfather, the chief of their village, was also killed during the war. Growing up, Jok was solely exposed to football, and had no experience with basketball. The family eventually fled to Uganda and then Kenya to escape the war. They joined many other Sudanese refugees in Des Moines, Iowa, which was where they moved to in December 2003. Jok arrived in the United States without knowing any English.

In fourth grade, Jok was asked by his friends to play basketball for the Greenwood Elementary School team, and he became the tallest player on the team. He drew the attention of Mike Nixon, who wanted to create a fourth-grade Amateur Athletic Union (AAU) team at the time. He watched Jok play at a recreational game in Des Moines, and even though he did not touch the ball during the entire game, Jok was asked to join Nixon's team. Jok was reluctant to play basketball at this point in his life, but he made the all-tournament team at the fourth-grade AAU state championship. In seventh grade, he won the Spiece tournament title in Fort Wayne, Indiana. He received offers from colleges as early as eighth grade.

== High school career ==
Jok attended Theodore Roosevelt High School in Des Moines for his first two seasons of high school basketball. As a freshman, he was ranked by Scout.com as one of the top 10 recruits in the United States. In 2010, he was invited to the Nike Top 100 camp in St. Louis, making him one of 30 freshmen to attend the event. At the camp, he injured his knee, and thinking that it was tendinitis, he continued to play as a sophomore. However, he later learned that he was suffering from a torn patellar tendon, and he underwent surgery in June 2011. In his sophomore year, Jok averaged 18.5 points and seven rebounds, earning second-team all-state and all-conference honors. Following his second season, he transferred to Valley High School in West Des Moines, Iowa, where he was coached by Jeff Horner, who was the all-time assists leader at University of Iowa. Initially, he found it difficult to get back in rhythm. After recovering as a junior, Jok averaged 10.2 points and 4.3 rebounds, shooting 37 percent on three-pointers. In the following season, he was named first-team all-state and first-team Parade All-American, averaging 23.6 points, which made him the top scorer in the Iowa Class 4A.

== College career ==
During his freshman year at the University of Iowa, Jok played 9.4 minutes per game for the 2013–14 Iowa Hawkeyes, averaging 4.4 point per game. He tied a freshman record by scoring 10 or more points and shooting 80 percent or more in a first-round NCAA tournament game against the University of Tennessee. As a sophomore, he played in all 34 games and averaged 7.0 points per game and 34.3 percent on three-pointers. Jok showed improvement in his junior season, averaging 16.1 points in 27.7 minutes per game, while also shooting 40.2 percent on three-pointers (80 of 199). He was named second team all-conference in the Big Ten.

Jok's senior season saw the shooting guard continue to grow as a player. He led the Big Ten in scoring at 19.9 points per game. In 30.7 minutes per game he also hauled in 5.5 rebounds and added 2.6 assists per game. Jok's shooting continued to impress, as he led the Big Ten in free throw percentage at 91.1% (154 of 169) and was fifth in the Big Ten in three-point field goal percentage at 38.0% (84 of 221). He was named first team all-conference in the Big Ten, was an AP Senior All-American, and earned an honorable mention on the AP All-American team. He won the 2017 College Three-Point Shooting contest at the 2017 Final Four on his 23rd birthday.

Jok finished his collegiate career with over 1,500 points and 400 rebounds.

== Professional career ==
=== Northern Arizona Suns (2017–2019) ===
After being undrafted for the 2017 NBA draft, Jok played for the New Orleans Pelicans during the 2017 NBA Summer League. He recorded around nine points per game in three games with the Pelicans. On 22 September 2017, Jok signed a partially guaranteed deal with the Phoenix Suns. He was waived by Phoenix before playing a single game with them on 11 October. He was called up by the Northern Arizona Suns as an affiliate player on 24 October. Jok made his professional debut on 4 November, playing in only eight minutes of action and recording a single rebound in a 126–118 loss to the Agua Caliente Clippers. Jok averaged 4.9 points, 2.2 rebounds, and 0.7 assists per game with Northern Arizona.

In the first game of the 2018–19 NBA G League season, Jok had a double-double with 19 points on 7-of-13 shooting, 10 rebounds and two assists in a 118–108 loss to the Santa Cruz Warriors.

=== Cholet Basket (2019–2020) ===
On 17 July 2019, Jok signed with Cholet Basket of the French LNB Pro A. He averaged 10.2 points, 3.1 rebounds and 1.2 assists per game.

=== UCAM Murcia (2020–2021) ===
On 27 June 2020, Jok signed with UCAM Murcia of the Spanish Liga ACB.

=== Second stint with Cholet Basket (2021–2022) ===
On 2 July 2021, Jok returned to Cholet Basket of France's LNB Pro A.

=== Sioux Falls Skyforce (2023–2024) ===
On 16 December 2023, Jok joined the Sioux Falls Skyforce of the NBA G League, but was waived on 14 January 2024. On 23 February, he re-joined Sioux Falls, but was waived on 11 March.

=== Ottawa BlackJacks (2024) ===
On 19 March 2024, Jok signed with the Ottawa BlackJacks of the Canadian Elite Basketball League (CEBL). However, he was waived on 3 June.

=== Cibona (2024–2026) ===
On 6 September 2024, Jok signed with Cibona of the Croatian League and the ABA League.

=== Petro de Luanda (2026) ===
In February 2026, Jok joined Petro de Luanda.

== Personal life ==
Jok's mother, Amelia Ring Bol, is a member of the South Sudan parliament. She visits Jok and the rest of her family in Des Moines occasionally. His legal guardian in Iowa is Mike Nixon. He has an older brother, Dau, and a younger brother, Jo Jo. Jo Jo played American football as a defensive lineman at Dowling Catholic High School and Iowa Western Community College. Jok's uncle was the late former NBA player Manute Bol, cousin to Manute's son Bol Bol; former Chicago Bull forward Luol Deng is one of his mother's cousins.

On 26 April 2014, Jok was arrested at 2:43 am for driving under the influence after turning on an improper lane without a safety flag. In addition, one of his moped's rear taillights was missing its cover. After Jok denied the accusations, he found to have watery eyes and an alcoholic smell, with a blood alcohol content of .082. He was taken into custody and remained at the Johnson County Jail until the middle of the day. His license was revoked. Jok pleaded guilty on May 2 and participated in a weekend drunk-driving program. On 15 July 2014, Jok was arrested a second time for driving with a revoked licence. University of Iowa athletics director Gary Barta said, "I'm very disappointed to learn about this, especially in light of the fact that Peter had a previous incident earlier this summer". Jok was incarcerated for four days at the Johnson County Jail, but his status with the team was unaffected.
