= Scottie Lindsey =

American basketball player

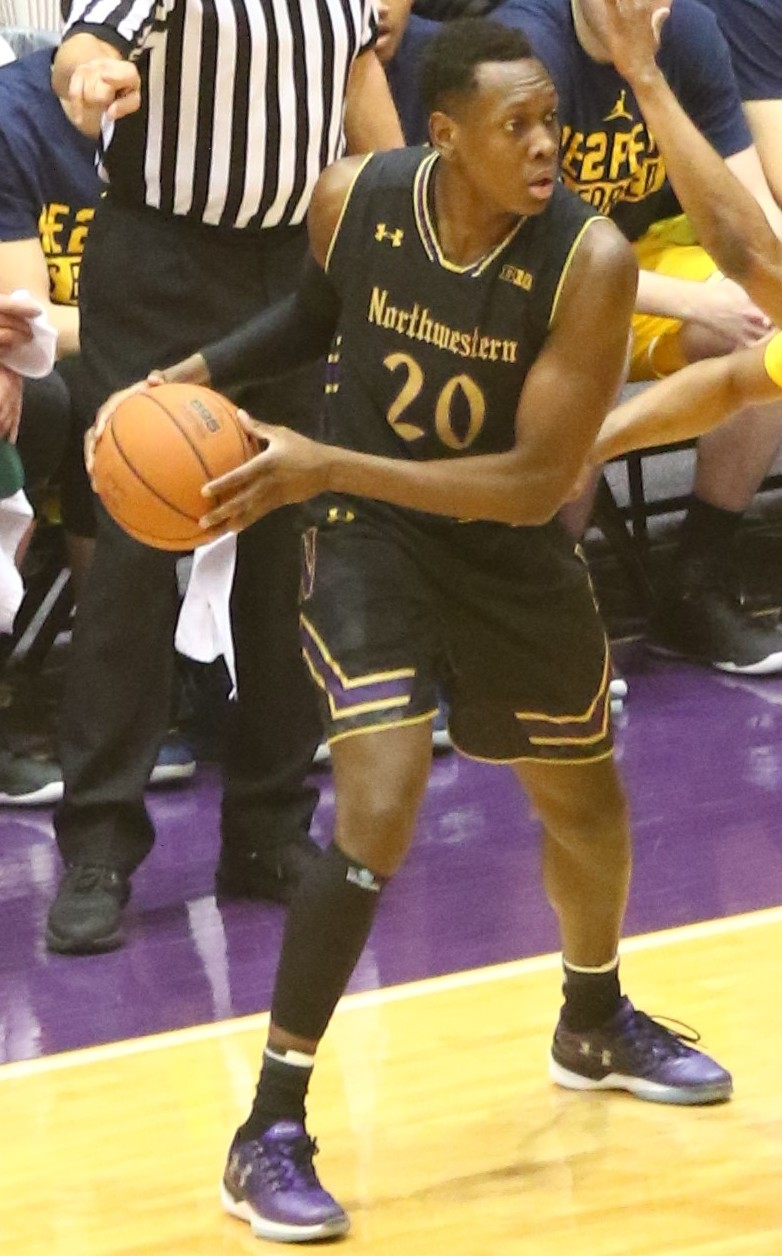
- Lindsey in 2017 for the 2016–17 Northwestern Wildcats

No. 24 – Guizhou Raptors
- Position: Shooting guard
- League: NBL

Personal information
- Born: May 20, 1996 (age 30) Hillside, Illinois, U.S.
- Listed height: 6 ft 6 in (1.98 m)
- Listed weight: 210 lb (95 kg)

Career information
- High school: Fenwick (Oak Park, Illinois)
- College: Northwestern (2014–2018)
- NBA draft: 2018: undrafted
- Playing career: 2018–present

Career history
- 2018–2019: Grand Rapids Drive
- 2019–2020: Erie BayHawks
- 2020–2021: Benfica
- 2021–2022: Windy City Bulls
- 2022: Saskatchewan Rattlers
- 2022–2023: Maine Celtics
- 2023–2024: Long Island Nets
- 2024: Windy City Bulls
- 2024: Winnipeg Sea Bears
- 2025: Sheffield Sharks
- 2025: BBC Arantia Larochette
- 2025: Edmonton Stingers
- 2025–present: Guizhou Raptors

Career highlights
- Third-team All-Big Ten (2017)
- Stats at NBA.com
- Stats at Basketball Reference

Scott Christopher Lindsey (born May 20, 1996) is an American professional basketball player for the Guizhou Raptors of the National Basketball League (NBL). He played college basketball for the Northwestern Wildcats.

== High school career ==
Lindsey was a star basketball player at Fenwick High School. Before his senior season, Lindsey broke his leg during a pick-up game at a summer recruiting visit to Vanderbilt. He joined coach Chris Collins's first recruiting class at Northwestern.

== College career ==
Lindsey was a four-year player for Northwestern. As a freshman he played 31 games and started 10 games and averaged 4.4 points and 2.3 rebounds per game. As a sophomore he played 31 games and 3 starts and put up 6.4 points, 2.3 rebounds and 1.4 assists per game. Lindsey was named Big Ten player of the week on January 16, 2017, after contributing 22 points, eight rebounds, five assists and three steals in a win over Iowa. As a junior, he was a key piece along with Bryant McIntosh to lead Northwestern to a win over 9th seeded Vanderbilt and a Round of 32 appearance in the NCAA Tournament. He put up 14.1 points, and 3.8 rebounds per game. He was recognized as a 2017 All-Big Ten team 3rd team selection by the coaches and Honorable Mention by the media. As a senior he came in at 19th in school history with 1,270 points and averaged 15.2 points, 3.8 rebounds and 1.7 assists per game, hitting 36.2 percent of his 3-pointers.

SEASON AVERAGES
SEASON	TEAM	MIN	FGM-FGA	FG%	3PM-3PA	3P%	FTM-FTA	FT%	REB	AST	BLK	STL	PF	TO	PTS
2017-18	NW	32.1	5.3-13.3	.399	2.5-6.8	.362	2.1-2.6	.829	3.8	1.7	0.4	0.5	2.6	1.6	15.2
2016-17	NW	30.6	5.1-12.0	.424	1.8-5.6	.322	2.1-2.5	.840	3.8	2.3	0.3	0.9	2.3	1.4	14.1
2015-16	NW	18.9	2.3-5.3	.436	1.2-3.0	.409	0.5-0.7	.739	2.3	1.4	0.2	0.5	2.2	0.8	6.4
2014-15	NW	15.1	1.6-4.1	.405	0.7-2.1	.354	0.4-0.5	.647	2.3	0.5	0.4	0.3	1.9	0.6	4.4

== Professional career ==
=== Grand Rapids Drive (2018–2019) ===
Lindsey played in the 2018 NBA Summer League with the Detroit Pistons. He joined the roster of their G League affiliate, the Grand Rapids Drive. In December 2018, Lindsey suffered a season-ending injury and was released by the Drive. He averaged 10.5 points and 3.7 rebounds in 15 games.

=== Erie BayHawks (2019–2020) ===
For the 2019–20 season, Lindsey joined the Erie BayHawks of the G League. On March 3, 2020, Lindsey had 16 points, five rebounds, three steals and two assists in a loss to the Long Island Nets. He averaged 10.4 points and 3.7 rebounds per game.

Lindsey signed with Benfica of the Portuguese Basketball League on June 21, 2020.

=== Windy City Bulls (2021–2022) ===
Lindsey was selected with the 17th pick in the 2021 NBA G League draft by the Windy City Bulls.

Lindsey signed with the Saskatchewan Rattlers of the Canadian Elite Basketball League on April 27, 2022.

=== Maine Celtics (2022–2023) ===
On October 24, 2022, Lindsey joined the Maine Celtics training camp roster.

=== Long Island Nets (2023–2024) ===
On September 25, 2023, Lindsey's rights were traded to the Long Island Nets. The next day, he signed with the Brooklyn Nets, but was waived on September 28. On October 28, he joined Long Island, but was waived on January 4, 2024.

=== Return to Windy City (2024) ===
On January 6, 2024, Lindsey returned to the Windy City Bulls.

=== Winnipeg Sea Bears (2024) ===
On June 22, 2024, Lindsey signed with the Winnipeg Sea Bears of the Canadian Elite Basketball League.

On October 28, Lindsey rejoined the Windy City Bulls, but was waived on November 6.

=== Sheffield Sharks (2025) ===
On January 17, 2025, Lindsey signed with the Sheffield Sharks of the Super League Basketball.
