= 2016–17 Northwestern Wildcats men's basketball team =

American college basketball season

2016–17 Northwestern Wildcats men's basketball

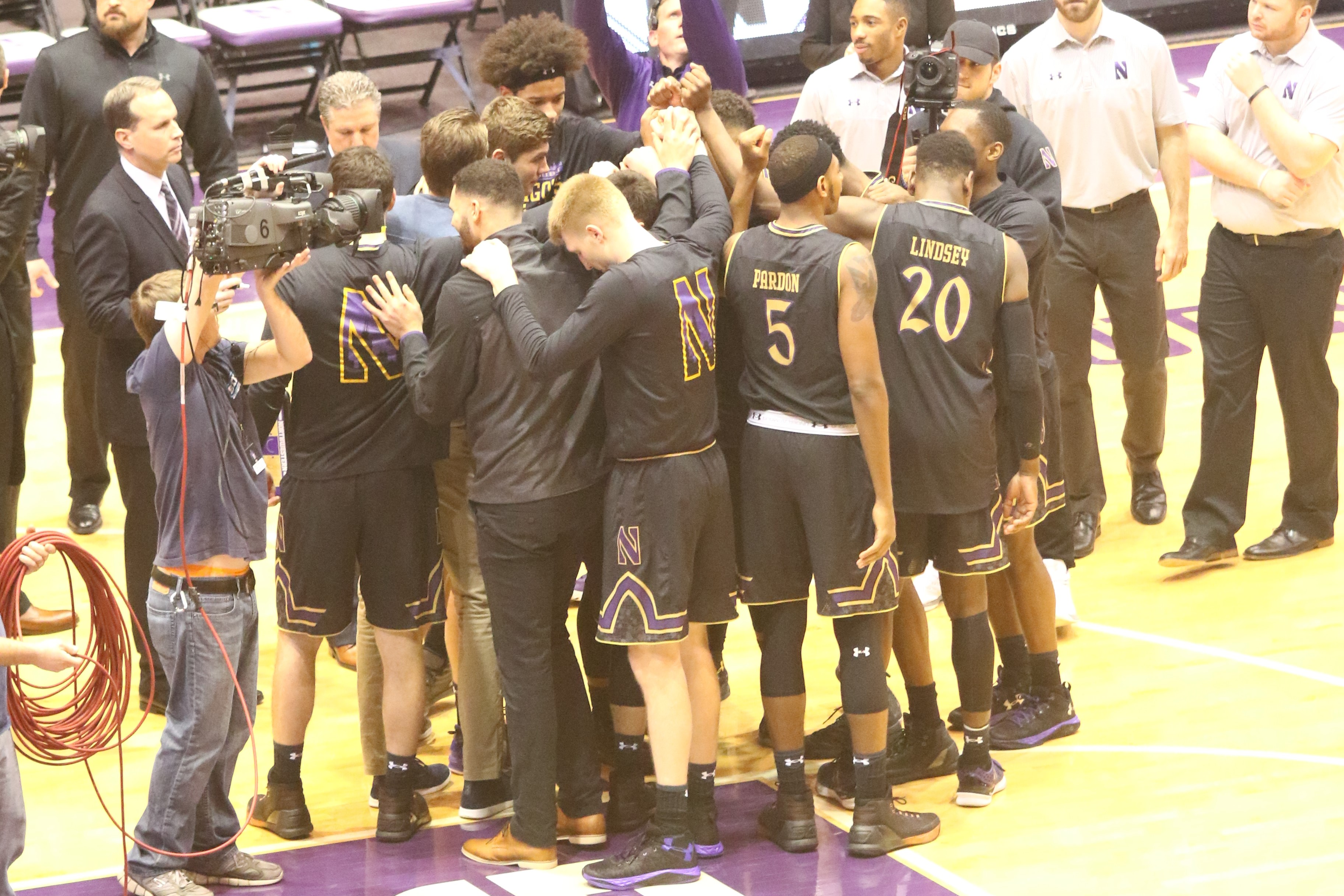

NCAA tournament, Second Round
- Conference: Big Ten Conference
- Record: 24–12 (10–8 Big Ten)
- Head coach: Chris Collins (4th season)
- Assistant coaches: Brian James; Patrick Baldwin; Armon Gates
- Captains: Sanjay Lumpkin; Bryant McIntosh
- Home arena: Welsh-Ryan Arena

2016–17 Big Ten Conference men's basketball standings
	Conf.				Overall
Team	W		L	PCT	W		L	PCT
No. 15 Purdue	14	–	4	.778	27	–	8	.771
No. 25 Wisconsin	12	–	6	.667	27	–	10	.730
Maryland	12	–	6	.667	24	–	9	.727
Minnesota	11	–	7	.611	24	–	10	.706
No. 23 Michigan †	10	–	8	.556	26	–	12	.684
Northwestern	10	–	8	.556	24	–	12	.667
Michigan State	10	–	8	.556	20	–	15	.571
Iowa	10	–	8	.556	19	–	15	.559
Illinois	8	–	10	.444	20	–	15	.571
Ohio State	7	–	11	.389	17	–	15	.531
Indiana	7	–	11	.389	18	–	16	.529
Penn State	6	–	12	.333	15	–	18	.455
Nebraska	6	–	12	.333	12	–	19	.387
Rutgers	3	–	15	.167	15	–	18	.455
† 2017 Big Ten tournament winner Rankings from AP poll

The 2016–17 Northwestern Wildcats men's basketball team represented Northwestern University in the 2016–17 NCAA Division I men's basketball season. They were led by fourth-year head coach Chris Collins. They were members of the Big Ten Conference and played their home games at Welsh-Ryan Arena. They finished the season 24–12, 10–8 in Big Ten play to finish in a tie for fifth place. In the Big Ten tournament, they defeated Rutgers and Maryland before losing to Wisconsin in the semifinals. They received the school's first ever bid to the NCAA tournament as a No. 8 seed in the West region. In the First Round, they defeated No. 9-seeded Vanderbilt before losing to No. 1-seeded Gonzaga in the Second Round.

== Previous season ==
The Wildcats finished the 2015–16 season with a record 20–12, 8–10 in Big Ten play to finish in ninth place. They lost to Michigan in the second round of the Big Ten tournament.

== Offseason ==
=== Departures ===
Name	Number	Pos.	Height	Weight	Year	Hometown	Notes
Joey van Zegeren	1	F	6'10"	235	RS Senior	Hoogeveen, Netherlands	Graduated
Tre Demps	14	G	6'2"	198	RS Senior	San Antonio, TX	Graduated
Alex Olah	22	C	7'0"	270	Senior	Timișoara, Romania	Graduated

=== Recruiting classes ===
==== 2016 recruiting class ====
College recruiting
Name	Hometown	School	Height	Weight	Commit date
Barret Benson; C	Darien, IL	Hinsdale South	6 ft 10 in (2.08 m)	240 lb (110 kg)	Jul 6, 2015
Barret Benson; C	Recruit ratings: Scout: Rivals: 247Sports: (79)				
Rapolas Ivanauskas; SF	Barrington, IL	Barrington	6 ft 8 in (2.03 m)	195 lb (88 kg)	Apr 18, 2015
Rapolas Ivanauskas; SF	Recruit ratings: Scout: Rivals: 247Sports: (79)				
Isiah Brown; PG	Lynnwood, WA	Lakeside	5 ft 11 in (1.80 m)	155 lb (70 kg)	May 31, 2015
Isiah Brown; PG	Recruit ratings: Scout: Rivals: 247Sports: (75)				
Overall recruit ranking:
Note: In many cases, Scout, Rivals, 247Sports, On3, and ESPN may conflict in their listings of height and weight.; In these cases, the average was taken. ESPN grades are on a 100-point scale.; Sources: "2016 Team Ranking". Rivals.

==== 2017 recruiting class ====
College recruiting (2017)
Name	Hometown	School	Height	Weight	Commit date
Anthony Gaines; SG	New Hampton, New Hampshire	New Hampton School	6 ft 4 in (1.93 m)	190 lb (86 kg)	Sep 27, 2016
Anthony Gaines; SG	Recruit ratings: Scout: Rivals: (79)				
Overall recruit ranking:
Note: In many cases, Scout, Rivals, 247Sports, On3, and ESPN may conflict in their listings of height and weight.; In these cases, the average was taken. ESPN grades are on a 100-point scale.; Sources: "2017 Team Ranking". Rivals.

== Roster ==
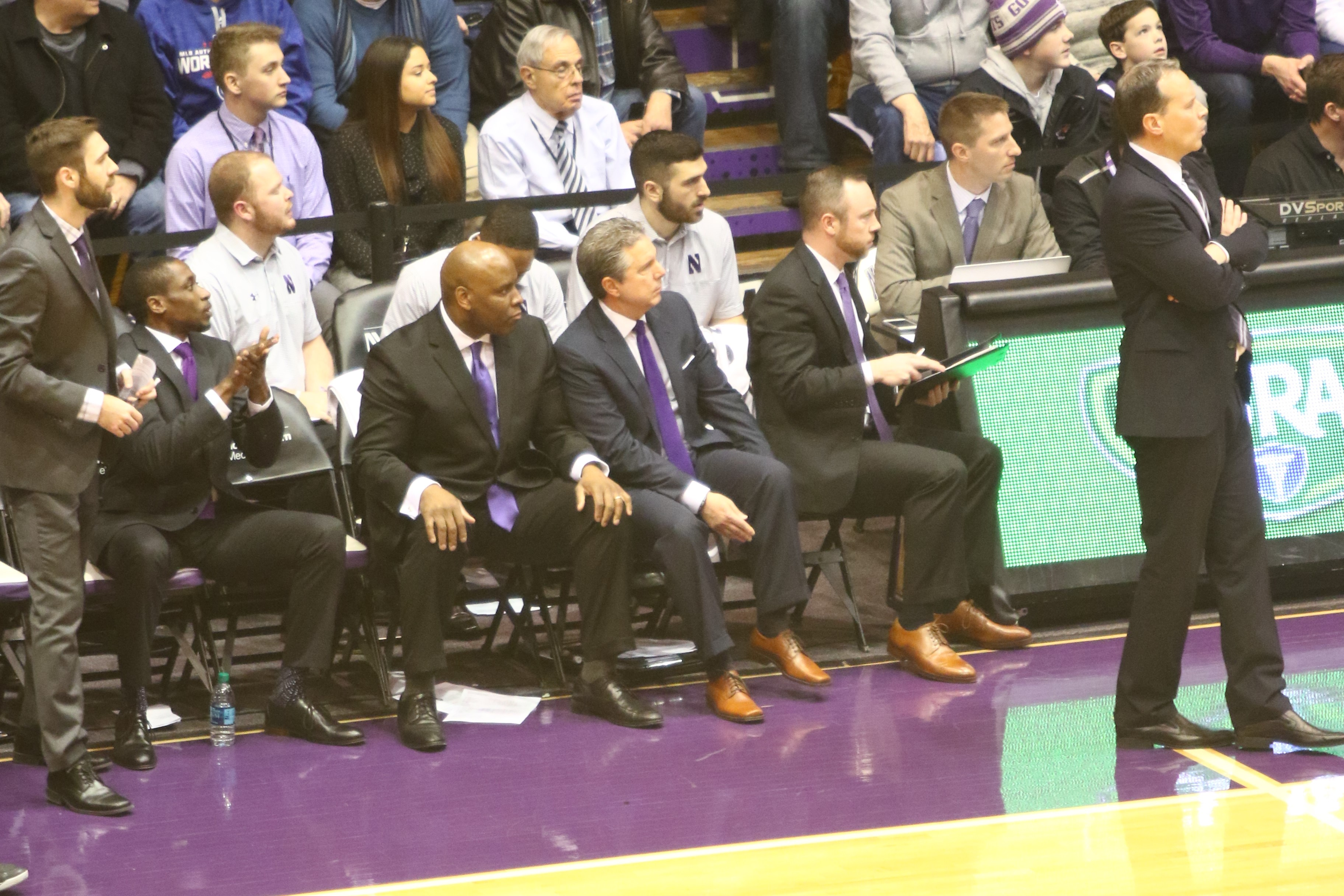
coaching staff on March 1

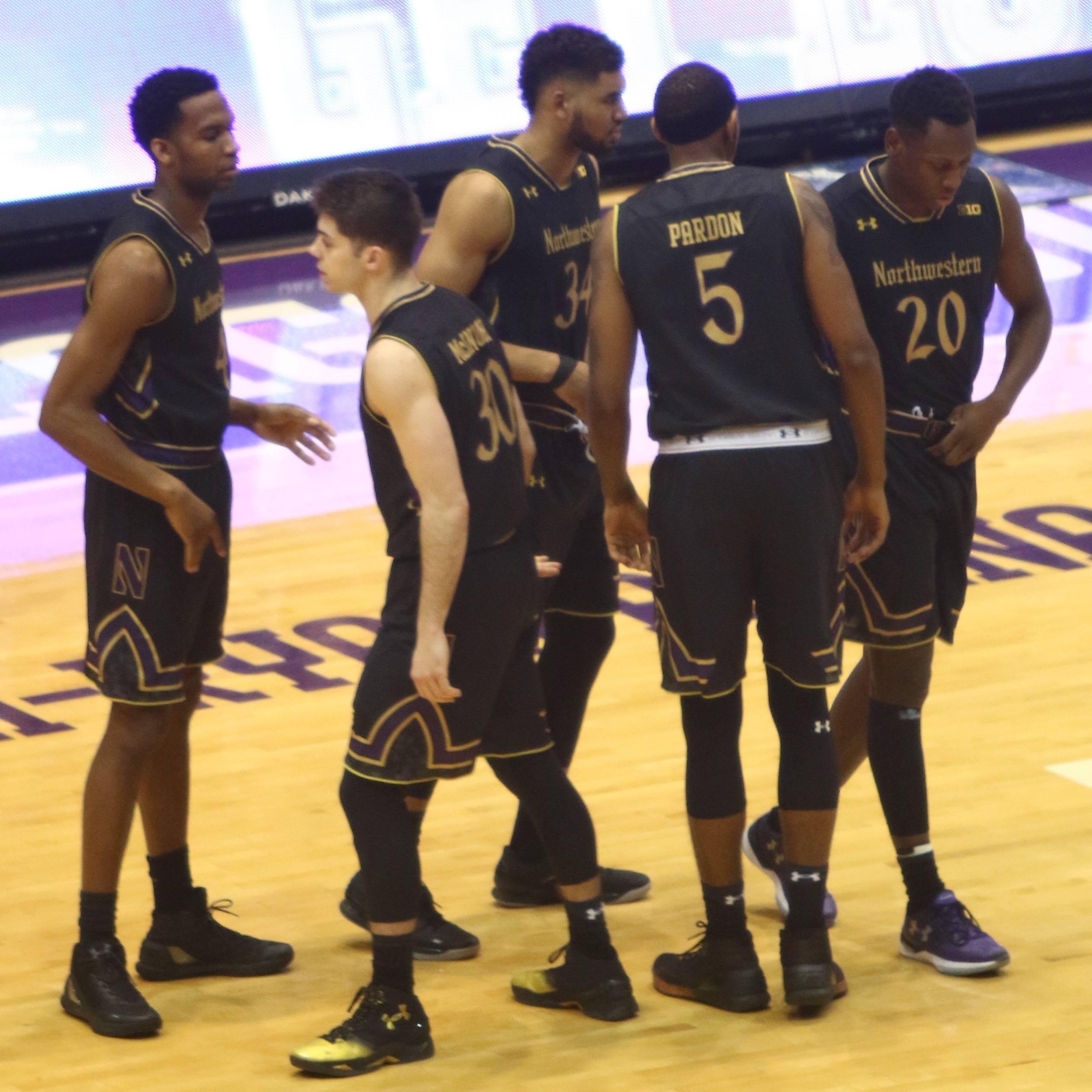
The starting 5 (left to right) Vic Law, Bryant McIntosh, Sanjay Lumpkin, Dererk Pardon, and Scottie Lindsey

2016–17 Northwestern Wildcats men's basketball team
Players
Coaches

Pos.	#	Name	Height	Weight	Year	Previous school	Hometown
F	4	Vic Law	6 ft 7 in (2.01 m)	205 lb (93 kg)	RS So	Saint Rita	South Holland, IL
C	5	Dererk Pardon	6 ft 8 in (2.03 m)	235 lb (107 kg)	So	Villa Angela-St. Joseph	Cleveland, OH
G	10	Charlie Hall (W)	6 ft 5 in (1.96 m)	210 lb (95 kg)	So	Crossroads	Los Angeles, CA
G	12	Isiah Brown	6 ft 2 in (1.88 m)	175 lb (79 kg)	Fr	Lakeside	Seattle, WA
F	14	Rapolas Ivanauskas	6 ft 9 in (2.06 m)	210 lb (95 kg)	Fr	Brewster Academy	Barrington, IL
G/F	20	Scottie Lindsey	6 ft 5 in (1.96 m)	210 lb (95 kg)	Jr	Fenwick	Hillsdale, IL
G	21	Tino Malnati (W)	6 ft 3 in (1.91 m)	175 lb (79 kg)	Fr	Wauwatosa West	Northfield, IL
G	23	Jordan Ash	6 ft 3 in (1.91 m)	190 lb (86 kg)	So	St. Joseph	Bolingbrook, IL
C	25	Barret Benson	6 ft 10 in (2.08 m)	240 lb (109 kg)	Fr	Hinsdale South	Chicago, IL
G	30	Bryant McIntosh (C)	6 ft 3 in (1.91 m)	185 lb (84 kg)	Jr	Greensburg Community	New Castle, IN
F	32	Nathan Taphorn	6 ft 7 in (2.01 m)	215 lb (98 kg)	Sr	Pekin	Pekin, IL
G/F	34	Sanjay Lumpkin (C)	6 ft 6 in (1.98 m)	220 lb (100 kg)	RS Sr	Benilde-St. Margaret's	Wayzata, MN
F	35	Aaron Falzon	6 ft 8 in (2.03 m)	205 lb (93 kg)	So	Northfield Mount Hermon	Newton, MA
F	44	Gavin Skelly	6 ft 8 in (2.03 m)	220 lb (100 kg)	Jr	Westlake	Westlake, OH

Head coach

- Chris Collins (Duke)

Assistant coach(es)

- Brian James (Illinois State)
- Patrick Baldwin (Northwestern)
- Armon Gates (Kent State)

Legend

- (C) Team captain
- (S) Suspended
- (I) Ineligible
- (W) Walk-on
- Injured
- Current redshirt

Roster

Sanjay Lumpkin and Bryant McIntosh were named captain.

== Schedule and results ==
=== Season notes ===
The team had a winning record in conference play for the first time since the 1967–68 Wildcats went 8–6. The 10 conference wins was the most since the 1932–33 Wildcats. The team was ranked in the AP Poll for the first time since the 2009–10 team. The team's buzzer-beating 21st victory on March 1 against Michigan established a new school record for wins in a season. The team earned the school's first NCAA tournament bid in school history, becoming the last team from a major conference to achieve the feat.

Date time, TV	Rank^{#}	Opponent^{#}	Result	Record	High points	High rebounds	High assists	Site (attendance) city, state
Exhibition
Nov 4, 2016*; 7:00 pm, BTN+		Illinois–Springfield	W 89–52		18 – Brown	6 – McIntosh	5 – McIntosh	Welsh-Ryan Arena; Evanston, IL
Non-conference regular season
Nov 11, 2016*; 7:00 pm, BTN+		Mississippi Valley State	W 94–63	1–0	18 – Law	8 – Lumpkin	4 – 3 Tied	Welsh-Ryan Arena (6,056); Evanston, IL
Nov 14, 2016*; 8:00 pm, BTN		Eastern Washington; Legends Classic	W 86–72	2–0	26 – Law	6 – Lindsey	7 – McIntosh	Welsh-Ryan Arena (5,604); Evanston, IL
Nov 16, 2016*; 6:00 pm, FS1		at Butler; Gavitt Tipoff Games	L 68–70	2–1	17 – Law	7 – Lindsey	5 – McIntosh	Hinkle Fieldhouse (7,858); Indianapolis, IN
Nov 21, 2016*; 8:30 pm, ESPN3		vs. No. 22 Texas; Legends Classic semifinals	W 77–58	3–1	20 – McIntosh	11 – Pardon	5 – McIntosh	Barclays Center (6,780); Brooklyn, NY
Nov 22, 2016*; 5:00 pm, ESPN2		vs. Notre Dame; Legends Classic championship	L 66–70	3–2	17 – Lindsey	7 – Pardon	4 – McIntosh	Barclays Center (5,711); Brooklyn, NY
Nov 25, 2016*; 2:00 pm, BTN+		Bryant; Legends Classic	W 86–66	4–2	22 – Law	10 – Pardon	6 – Lindsey	Welsh-Ryan Arena (6,322); Evanston, IL
Nov 28, 2016*; 8:00 pm, ESPNU		Wake Forest; ACC–Big Ten Challenge	W 65–58	5–2	23 – McIntosh	7 – Lumpkin	4 – Lindsey	Welsh-Ryan Arena (6,386); Evanston, IL
Dec 3, 2016*; 6:00 pm, BTN		DePaul	W 80–64	6–2	19 – Lindsey	10 – Lumpkin	7 – Lindsey	Welsh-Ryan Arena (6,751); Evanston, IL
Dec 11, 2016*; 6:00 pm, BTN		New Orleans	W 83–49	7–2	18 – Taphorn	9 – Skelly	7 – McIntosh	Welsh-Ryan Arena (6,635); Evanston, IL
Dec 14, 2016*; 6:00 pm, BTN		Chicago State	W 68–64	8–2	18 – Law	12 – Lumpkin	7 – McIntosh	Welsh-Ryan Arena (5,723); Evanston, IL
Dec 17, 2016*; 6:00 pm, BTN		vs. Dayton; State Farm Chicago Legends	W 67–64	9–2	14 – Lumpkin	14 – Lumpkin	5 – McIntosh	United Center; Chicago, IL
Dec 20, 2016*; 7:00 pm, BTN+		IUPUI	W 87–65	10–2	19 – Skelly	13 – Lumpkin	9 – McIntosh	Welsh-Ryan Arena (6,452); Evanston, IL
Dec 22, 2016*; 7:00 pm, BTN+		Houston Baptist	W 72–63	11–2	19 – Lindsey	9 – Lumpkin	6 – McIntosh	Welsh-Ryan Arena (6,372); Evanston, IL
Big Ten regular season
Dec 27, 2016; 2:00 pm, ESPN2		at Penn State	W 87–77	12–2 (1–0)	31 – Lindsey	12 – Law	8 – McIntosh	Bryce Jordan Center (5,811); University Park, PA
Dec 30, 2016; 5:00 pm, BTN		at Michigan State	L 52–61	12–3 (1–1)	16 – Law	9 – Law	5 – McIntosh	Breslin Center (14,797); East Lansing, MI
Jan 5, 2017; 8:00 pm, ESPNU		Minnesota	L 66–70	12–4 (1–2)	21 – McIntosh	8 – Law	5 – McIntosh	Welsh-Ryan Arena (7,215); Evanston, IL
Jan 8, 2017; 1:15 pm, BTN		at Nebraska	W 74–66	13–4 (2–2)	19 – Lindsey	5 – Law	4 – McIntosh	Pinnacle Bank Arena (15,053); Lincoln, NE
Jan 12, 2017; 8:00 pm, ESPNU		at Rutgers	W 69–60	14–4 (3–2)	23 – Law	11 – Pardon	4 – McIntosh	Louis Brown Athletic Center (3,723); Piscataway, NJ
Jan 15, 2017; 6:30 pm, BTN		Iowa	W 89–54	15–4 (4–2)	22 – Lindsey	9 – Pardon	10 – McIntosh	Welsh-Ryan Arena (7,732); Evanston, IL
Jan 22, 2017; 12:00 pm, BTN		at Ohio State	W 74–72	16–4 (5–2)	21 – Lindsey	11 – Lumpkin	4 – Pardon	Value City Arena (13,369); Columbus, OH
Jan 26, 2017; 7:00 pm, BTN		Nebraska	W 73–61	17–4 (6–2)	20 – Law	22 – Pardon	9 – McIntosh	Welsh-Ryan Arena (7,108); Evanston, IL
Jan 29, 2017; 5:30 pm, BTN		Indiana	W 68–55	18–4 (7–2)	21 – McIntosh	12 – Law	8 – McIntosh	Welsh-Ryan Arena (8,117); Evanston, IL
Feb 1, 2017; 7:30 pm, BTN	No. 25	at No. 23 Purdue	L 59–80	18–5 (7–3)	22 – McIntosh	7 – Lumpkin	4 – McIntosh	Mackey Arena (14,804); West Lafayette, IN
Feb 7, 2017; 7:00 pm, BTN		Illinois	L 61–68	18–6 (7–4)	21 – McIntosh	9 – Law	4 – McIntosh	Welsh-Ryan Arena (7,614); Evanston, IL
Feb 12, 2017; 5:30 pm, BTN		at No. 7 Wisconsin	W 66–59	19–6 (8–4)	25 – McIntosh	8 – Pardon	7 – McIntosh	Kohl Center (17,287); Madison, WI
Feb 15, 2017; 6:00 pm, BTN		No. 23 Maryland	L 64–74	19–7 (8–5)	19 – Brown	8 – Law	6 – McIntosh	Welsh-Ryan Arena (7,007); Evanston, IL
Feb 18, 2017; 5:00 pm, ESPNU		Rutgers	W 69–65	20–7 (9–5)	18 – McIntosh	8 – Pardon	6 – McIntosh	Welsh-Ryan Arena (8,117); Evanston, IL
Feb 21, 2017; 7:00 pm, BTN		at Illinois	L 50–66	20–8 (9–6)	16 – McIntosh	12 – Pardon	3 – McIntosh	State Farm Center (11,206); Champaign, IL
Feb 25, 2017; 7:00 pm, BTN		at Indiana	L 62–63	20–9 (9–7)	22 – McIntosh	10 – Pardon	2 – McIntosh	Assembly Hall (17,222); Bloomington, IN
Mar 1, 2017; 6:00 pm, BTN		Michigan	W 67–65	21–9 (10–7)	18 – Law	8 – Pardon	5 – McIntosh	Welsh-Ryan Arena (8,117); Evanston, IL
Mar 5, 2017; 3:30 pm, CBS		No. 16 Purdue	L 65–69	21–10 (10–8)	25 – McIntosh	7 – Lumpkin	6 – McIntosh	Welsh-Ryan Arena (8,117); Evanston, IL
Big Ten tournament
Mar 9, 2017; 8:30 pm, ESPN2	(6)	vs. (14) Rutgers; Second Round	W 83–61	22–10	16 – Law	8 – Pardon	4 – Law	Verizon Center (12,408); Washington, D.C.
Mar 10, 2017; 8:55 pm, BTN	(6)	vs. (3) No. 25 Maryland; Quarterfinals	W 72–64	23–10	17 – 2 Tied	8 – Pardon	6 – McIntosh	Verizon Center (15,624); Washington, D.C.
Mar 11, 2017; 2:30 pm, CBS	(6)	vs. (2) No. 24 Wisconsin; Semifinals	L 48–76	23–11	16 – Lindsey	7 – Pardon	1 – 5 Tied	Verizon Center (13,984); Washington, D.C.
NCAA tournament
Mar 16, 2017*; 3:30 pm, TBS	(8 W)	vs. (9 W) Vanderbilt; First Round	W 68–66	24–11	25 – McIntosh	11 – Pardon	3 – McIntosh	Vivint Smart Home Arena (16,952); Salt Lake City, UT
Mar 18, 2017*; 4:15 pm, CBS	(8 W)	vs. (1 W) No. 2 Gonzaga; Second Round	L 73–79	24–12	20 – McIntosh	8 – Law	7 – McIntosh	Vivint Smart Home Arena (18,565); Salt Lake City, UT
*Non-conference game. ^{#}Rankings from AP Poll. (#) Tournament seedings in parentheses. W=West Region. All times are in Central Time Source.

== Rankings ==
Ranking movements Legend: ██ Increase in ranking ██ Decrease in ranking — = Not ranked RV = Received votes
	Week																			
Poll	Pre	1	2	3	4	5	6	7	8	9	10	11	12	13	14	15	16	17	18	Final
AP	—	—	—	—	—	—	RV	RV	RV	—	RV	RV	25	RV	RV	RV	—	—	RV	Not released
Coaches	—	—	—	—	—	—	—	—	—	RV	RV	RV	RV	RV	RV	RV	RV	RV	RV	

*AP does not release post-NCAA tournament rankings

== Honors ==
2016–17 All Big Ten Conference team honorees

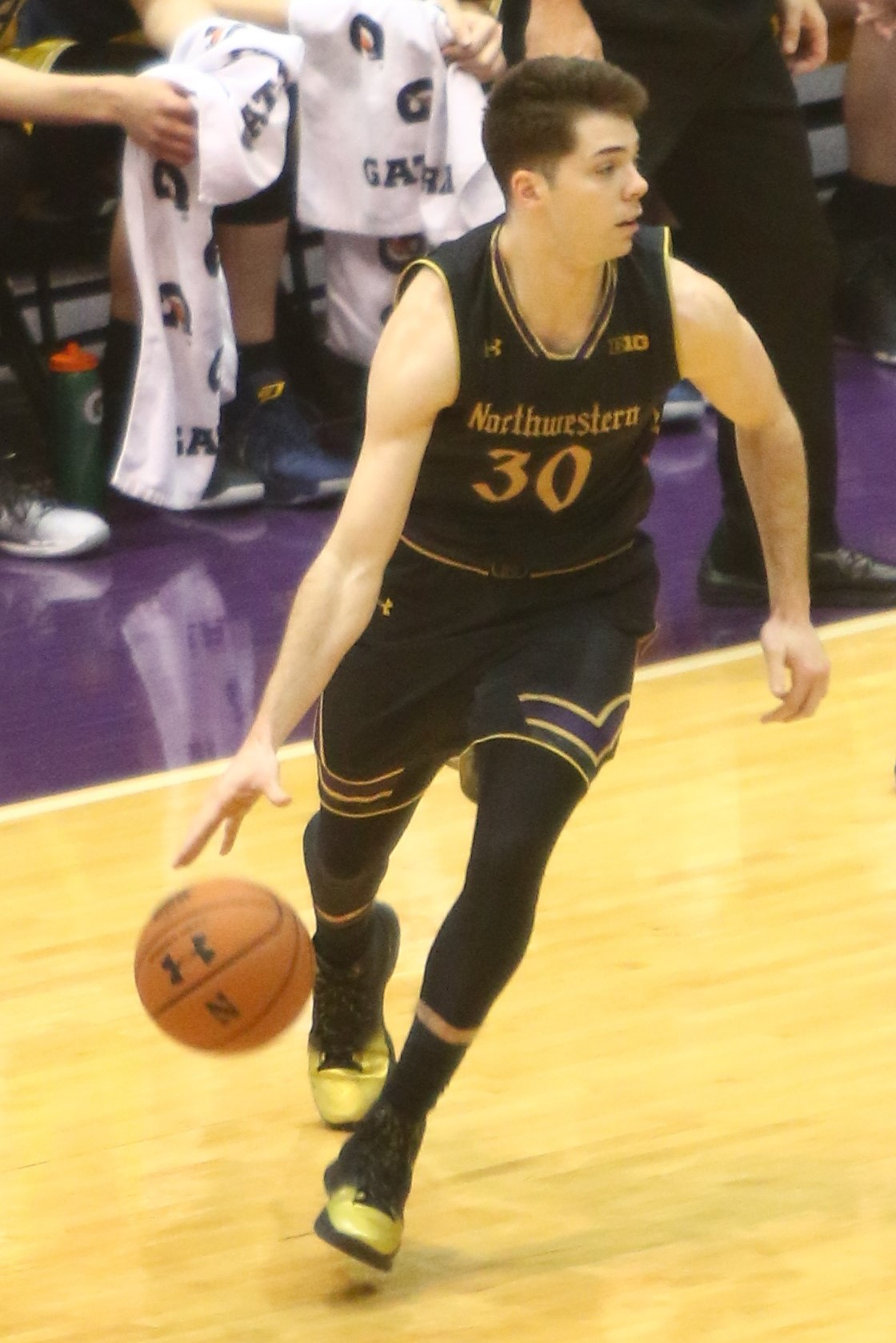
Bryant McIntosh, 2nd team

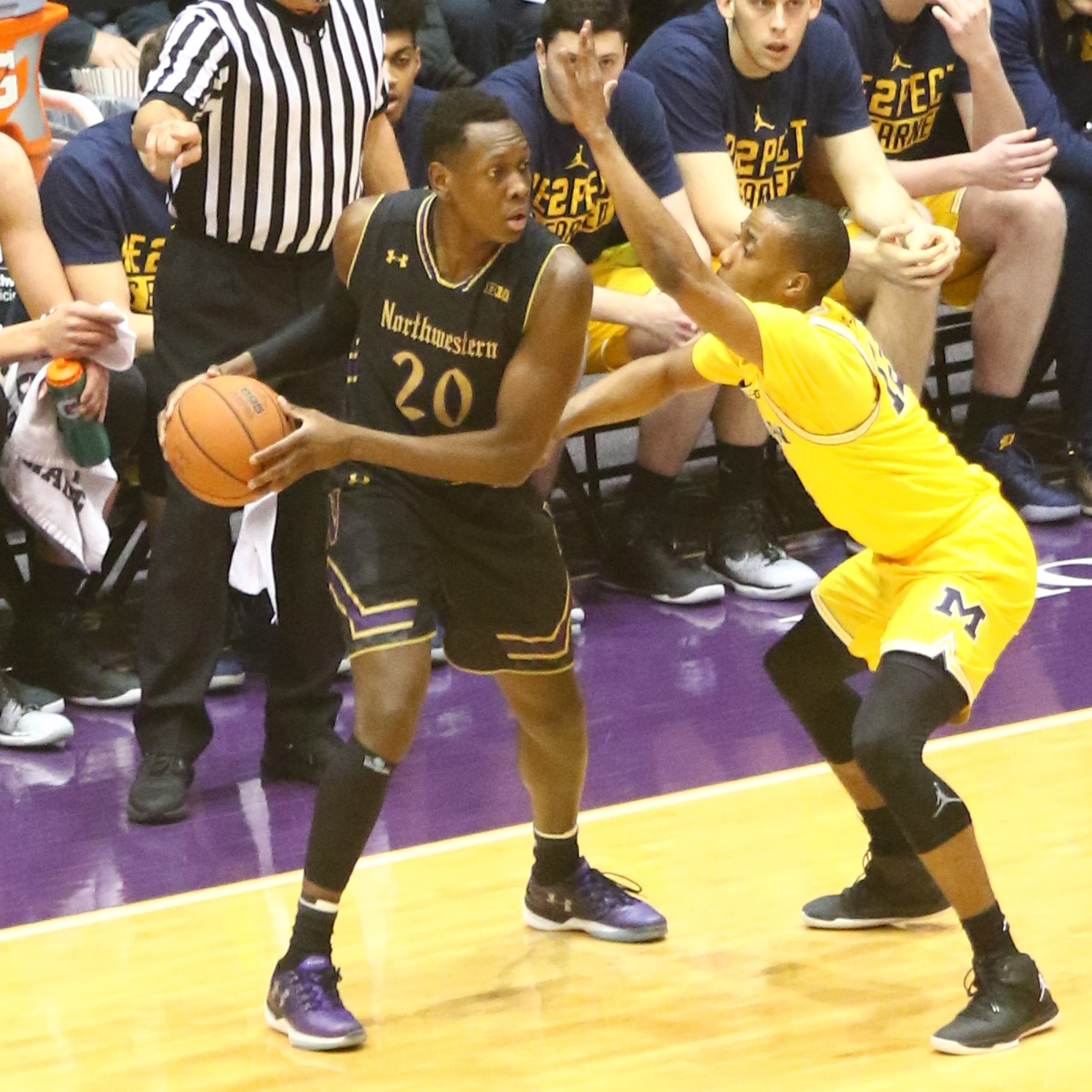
Scottie Lindsey, 3rd team/hon. mention

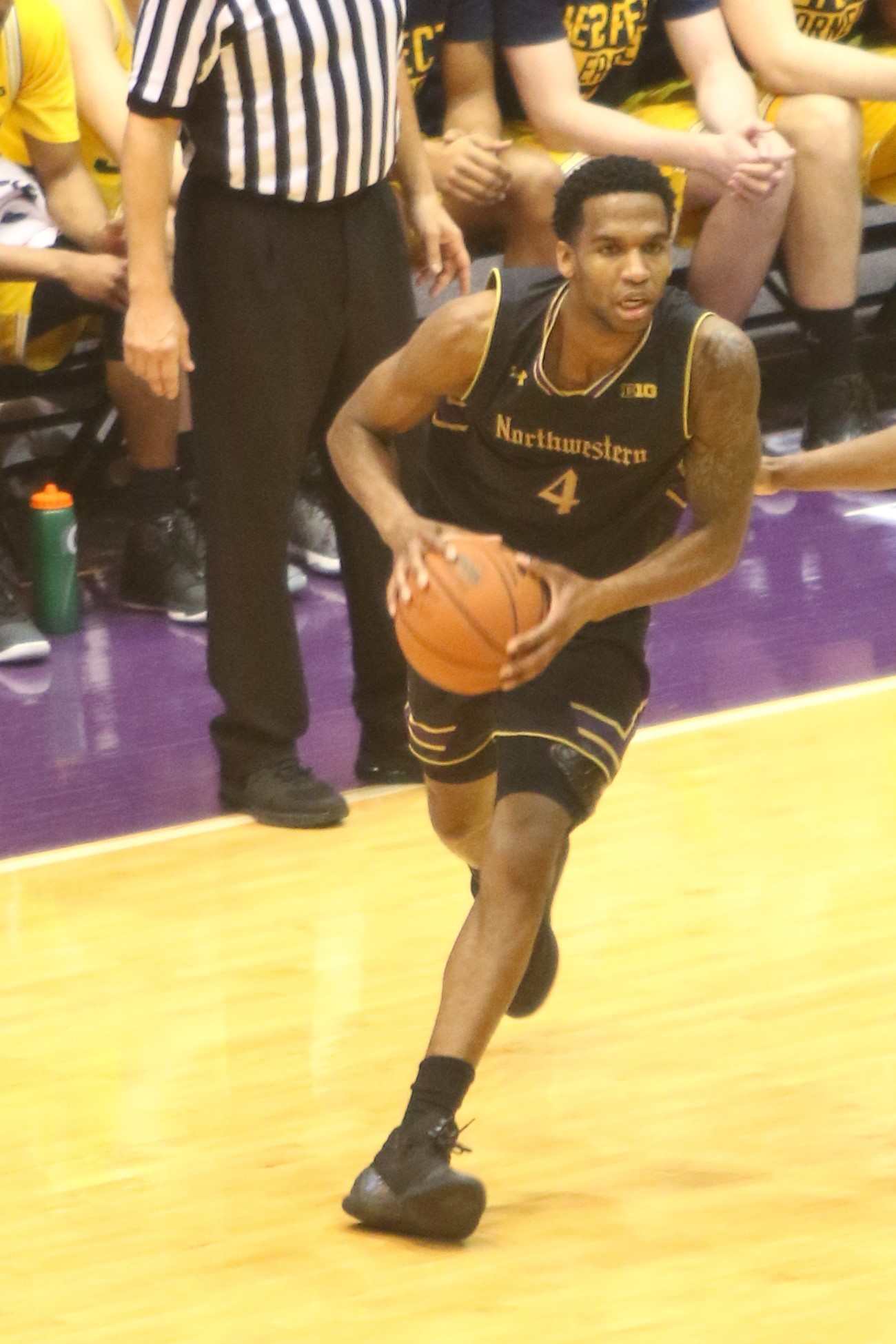
Vic Law, defensive team

McIntosh was named to the All-Big Ten second team by the coaches and the media. Scottie Lindsey was named to the third team by the coaches and honorable mention by the media. Vic Law was selected to the All-Big Ten Defensive team. McIntosh was one of ten Big Ten players honored as All-District selections by the United States Basketball Writers Association.
