= 2016–17 Xavier Musketeers men's basketball team =

American college basketball season

2016–17 Xavier Musketeers men's basketball

Tire Pros Invitational champions

NCAA tournament, Elite Eight
- Conference: Big East Conference

Ranking
- Coaches: No. 18
- Record: 24–14 (9–9 Big East)
- Head coach: Chris Mack (8th season)
- Assistant coaches: Travis Steele; Luke Murray; Mike Pegues
- Home arena: Cintas Center

2016–17 Big East men's basketball standings
	Conf.				Overall
Team	W		L	PCT	W		L	PCT
No. 1 Villanova †	15	–	3	.833	32	–	4	.889
No. 21 Butler	12	–	6	.667	25	–	9	.735
Creighton	10	–	8	.556	25	–	10	.714
Seton Hall	10	–	8	.556	21	–	12	.636
Providence	10	–	8	.556	20	–	13	.606
Marquette	10	–	8	.556	19	–	13	.594
Xavier	9	–	9	.500	24	–	14	.632
St. John's	7	–	11	.389	14	–	19	.424
Georgetown	5	–	13	.278	14	–	18	.438
DePaul	2	–	16	.111	9	–	23	.281
† 2017 Big East tournament winner Rankings from AP poll

The 2016–17 Xavier Musketeers men's basketball team represented Xavier University during the 2016–17 NCAA Division I men's basketball season. Led by eighth-year head coach Chris Mack, they played their games at the Cintas Center in Norwood, Ohio and were fourth-year members of the Big East Conference. They finished the season 24–14, 9–9 in Big East play to finish in seventh place. In the Big East tournament, they defeated DePaul and Butler before losing to Creighton in the semifinals. They received an at-large bid to the NCAA tournament as a No. 11 seed in the West region where they defeated Maryland, Florida State, and Arizona before losing in the Elite Eight to Gonzaga.

== Previous season ==
The Musketeers finished the 2015–16 season 28–6, 14–4 in Big East play to finish in second place. They defeated Marquette in the quarterfinals of the Big East tournament to advance to the semifinals where they lost to Seton Hall. They received an at-large bid to the NCAA tournament where they received a No. 2 seed. They defeated Weber State in the First Round to advance to the Second Round where they lost to Wisconsin.

== Preseason ==
Prior to the season, Xavier was picked to finish second in a poll of Big East coaches. Trevon Bluiett and Edmond Sumner were selected to the preseason All-Big East first team.

== Departures ==
Name	Number	Pos.	Height	Weight	Year	Hometown	Notes
Larry Austin Jr.	0	G	6'2"	174	Sophomore	Springfield, IL	Transferred to Vanderbilt
Jalen Reynolds	1	F	6'10"	232	Junior	Livonia, MI	Declare for 2016 NBA draft
James Farr	2	F	6'10"	247	Senior	Evanston, IL	Graduated
Remy Abell	10	G	6'4"	195	RS Senior	Louisville, KY	Graduated
Makinde London	13	F	6'10"	210	RS Freshman	Nashville, TN	Transferred to Chattanooga
Kevin Coker	32	F	6'6"	200	Senior	Plainfield, IL	Graduated

=== Incoming transfers ===
Name	Number	Pos.	Height	Weight	Year	Hometown	Notes
Malcolm Bernard	11	F	6'6"	190	RS Senior	Middleburg, FL	Transferred from Florida A&M. Will eligible to play since Bernard graduated from Florida A&M.
RaShid Gaston	35	F	6'9	239	RS Senior	Warren, OH	Transferred from Norfolk State.

== Season summary ==
=== Preseason ===
Junior Trevon Bluiett entered his name in the NBA Pre-Draft, but withdrew his name prior to the deadline and will return to Xavier.

== Incoming recruits ==
College recruiting
Name	Hometown	School	Height	Weight	Commit date
Quentin Goodin #17 PG	Campbellsville, KY	Taylor County High School	6 ft 3 in (1.91 m)	190 lb (86 kg)	Nov 20, 2015
Quentin Goodin #17 PG	Recruit ratings: Scout: Rivals: 247Sports: ESPN:				
Tyrique Jones #24 PF	Bloomfield, CT	Vermont Academy	6 ft 7 in (2.01 m)	220 lb (100 kg)	Nov 20, 2015
Tyrique Jones #24 PF	Recruit ratings: Scout: Rivals: 247Sports: ESPN:				
Overall recruit ranking:
Note: In many cases, Scout, Rivals, 247Sports, On3, and ESPN may conflict in their listings of height and weight.; In these cases, the average was taken. ESPN grades are on a 100-point scale.; Sources: "2016 Team Ranking". Rivals.

== Future recruits ==
=== 2017–18 team recruits ===
College recruiting
Name	Hometown	School	Height	Weight	Commit date
Jared Ridder; SF	Springfield, MO	Kickapoo High School	6 ft 5 in (1.96 m)	180 lb (82 kg)	Jun 8, 2016
Jared Ridder; SF	Recruit ratings: Scout: Rivals: 247Sports: ESPN:				
Elias Harden; SG	Tyrone, GA	Sandy Creek High School	6 ft 6 in (1.98 m)	175 lb (79 kg)	Jul 27, 2016
Elias Harden; SG	Recruit ratings: Scout: Rivals: 247Sports: ESPN:				
Naji Marshall; SF	Greenbelt, MD	Hargrave Military Academy	6 ft 6 in (1.98 m)	185 lb (84 kg)	Jul 29, 2016
Naji Marshall; SF	Recruit ratings: Scout: Rivals: 247Sports: ESPN:				
Kentrevious Jones; C	Macon, GA	Westside High School	6 ft 10 in (2.08 m)	285 lb (129 kg)	Sep 25, 2016
Kentrevious Jones; C	Recruit ratings: Scout: Rivals: 247Sports: ESPN:				
Paul Scruggs; PG	Indianapolis, IN	Prolific Prep	6 ft 4 in (1.93 m)	200 lb (91 kg)	Oct 14, 2016
Paul Scruggs; PG	Recruit ratings: Scout: Rivals: 247Sports: ESPN:				
Overall recruit ranking:
Note: In many cases, Scout, Rivals, 247Sports, On3, and ESPN may conflict in their listings of height and weight.; In these cases, the average was taken. ESPN grades are on a 100-point scale.; Sources: "2017 Team Ranking". Rivals.

== Roster ==
2016–17 Xavier Musketeers men's basketball team
Players
Coaches

Pos.	#	Name	Height	Weight	Year	Previous school	Hometown
F	0	Tyrique Jones	6 ft 9 in (2.06 m)	237 lb (108 kg)	Fr	Vermont Academy	Bloomfield, Connecticut
G	3	Quentin Goodin	6 ft 4 in (1.93 m)	194 lb (88 kg)	Fr	Taylor County HS (KY)	Campbellsville, Kentucky
G	4	Edmond Sumner	6 ft 6 in (1.98 m)	186 lb (84 kg)	RS So	Detroit Country Day	Detroit, Michigan
G	5	Trevon Bluiett	6 ft 6 in (1.98 m)	198 lb (90 kg)	Jr	Park Tudor School	Indianapolis, Indiana
G	10	Leighton Schrand (W)	6 ft 0 in (1.83 m)	155 lb (70 kg)	Fr	Holy Cross HS (Covington, KY)	Villa Hills, Kentucky
G	11	Malcolm Bernard	6 ft 6 in (1.98 m)	202 lb (92 kg)	RS Sr	Middleburg HS	Miami, Florida
F	12	Cullen Barr (W)	6 ft 7 in (2.01 m)	233 lb (106 kg)	Sr	Carmel Catholic HS	Libertyville, Illinois
G	20	Alex Bergen (W)	6 ft 5 in (1.96 m)	205 lb (93 kg)	Sr	Oak Hills HS	Cincinnati, Ohio
F	21	Tim Stainbrook	6 ft 6 in (1.98 m)	208 lb (94 kg)	Sr	St. Edward HS (OH)	Bay Village, Ohio
F	22	Kaiser Gates	6 ft 8 in (2.03 m)	228 lb (103 kg)	So	St. Francis HS (GA)	Alpharetta, Georgia
G/F	24	Conor Peterson (W)	6 ft 6 in (1.98 m)	180 lb (82 kg)	Fr	Brewster Academy	Libertyville, Illinois
F	35	RaShid Gaston	6 ft 9 in (2.06 m)	239 lb (108 kg)	RS Sr	Warren G. Harding HS	Warren, Ohio
F/C	54	Sean O'Mara	6 ft 10 in (2.08 m)	244 lb (111 kg)	Jr	Benet Academy	Glen Ellyn, Illinois
G	55	J. P. Macura	6 ft 5 in (1.96 m)	203 lb (92 kg)	Jr	Lakeville North HS	Lakeville, Minnesota

Head coach

- Chris Mack (Xavier)

Assistant coach(es)

- Travis Steele (Butler)
- Luke Murray (Fairfield)
- Mike Pegues (Delaware)

Legend

- (C) Team captain
- (S) Suspended
- (I) Ineligible
- (W) Walk-on
- Injured
- Current redshirt

Roster

== Schedule and results ==
Date time, TV	Rank^{#}	Opponent^{#}	Result	Record	High points	High rebounds	High assists	Site (attendance) city, state
Exhibition
Nov 4, 2016*; 4:00 pm	No. 7	Ferris State	W 80–56		23 – Sumner	10 – Tied	6 – Sumner	Cintas Center (10,250); Cincinnati, OH
Regular season
Nov 11, 2016*; 7:00 pm, FCS	No. 7	Lehigh	W 84–81	1–0	25 – Bluiett	11 – Bluiett	6 – Sumner	Cintas Center (10,250); Cincinnati, OH
Nov 14, 2016*; 7:00 pm, CBSSN	No. 11	Buffalo	W 86–53	2–0	18 – Macura	11 – Jones	4 – Goodin	Cintas Center (10,116); Cincinnati, OH
Nov 17, 2016*; 1:00 pm, ESPNU	No. 11	vs. Missouri; Tire Pros Invitational quarterfinals	W 83–82 ^{OT}	3–0	19 – Macura	10 – Gaston	5 – Macura	HP Field House; Orlando, FL
Nov 18, 2016*; 1:30 pm, ESPNU	No. 11	vs. Clemson; Tire Pros Invitational semifinals	W 83–77	4–0	28 – Macura	7 – Bernard	6 – Sumner	HP Field House; Orlando, FL
Nov 20, 2016*; 6:30 pm, ESPN2	No. 11	vs. Northern Iowa; Tire Pros Invitational championship	W 67–59	5–0	21 – Bluiett	8 – Bluiett	3 – Sumner	HP Field House; Orlando, FL
Nov 26, 2016*; 12:00 pm, FSN	No. 9	Northern Iowa; Tire Pros Invitational non-bracketed game	W 64–42	6–0	18 – Macura	8 – Bluiett	7 – Sumner	Cintas Center (10,028); Cincinnati, OH
Nov 30, 2016*; 6:30 pm, FS1	No. 7	North Dakota State	W 85–55	7–0	23 – Bluiett	8 – Bernard	7 – Tied	Cintas Center (10,250); Cincinnati, OH
Dec 3, 2016*; 3:30 pm, ESPN2	No. 7	at No. 9 Baylor	L 61–76	7–1	23 – Bluiett	8 – Gaston	3 – Macura	Ferrell Center (9,684); Waco, TX
Dec 7, 2016*; 9:00 pm, P12N	No. 13	at Colorado	L 66–68	7–2	27 – Bluiett	11 – Gaston	5 – Sumner	Coors Events Center (7,743); Boulder, CO
Dec 10, 2016*; 5:30 pm, FOX	No. 13	Utah	W 77–69	8–2	18 – Tied	14 – Gaston	4 – Sumner	Cintas Center (10,350); Cincinnati, OH
Dec 17, 2016*; 8:30 pm, FS1	No. 17	Wake Forest; Skip Prosser Classic	W 69–65	9–2	20 – Bluiett	7 – Bluiett	3 – Bernard	Cintas Center (10,407); Cincinnati, OH
Dec 20, 2016*; 6:30 pm, FS1	No. 17	Eastern Washington	W 85–56	10–2	16 – Bluiett	6 – Macura	9 – Sumner	Cintas Center (10,250); Cincinnati, OH
Dec 28, 2016; 7:00 pm, FSN	No. 17	Providence	W 82–56	11–2 (1–0)	22 – Bluiett	9 – Bluiett	7 – Sumner	Cintas Center (10,426); Cincinnati, OH
Dec 31, 2016; 11:00 am, FS1	No. 17	at Georgetown	W 81–76	12–2 (2–0)	28 – Sumner	9 – Gaston	6 – Sumner	Verizon Center (11,275); Washington, D.C.
Jan 7, 2017; 2:30 pm, FS1	No. 16	St. John's	W 97–82	13–2 (3–0)	20 – Sumner	6 – Bluiett	7 – Sumner	Cintas Center (10,474); Cincinnati, OH
Jan 10, 2017; 7:00 pm, FS1	No. 15	at No. 3 Villanova	L 54–79	13–3 (3–1)	11 – Sumner	6 – Tied	3 – Bluiett	The Pavilion (6,500); Villanova, PA
Jan 14, 2017; 2:00 pm, FS1	No. 15	at No. 12 Butler	L 78–83	13–4 (3–2)	22 – Sumner	8 – Bernard	3 – Sumner	Hinkle Fieldhouse (9,166); Indianapolis, IN
Jan 16, 2017; 2:00 pm, FS1	No. 22	No. 7 Creighton	L 67–72	13–5 (3–3)	17 – Blueitt	17 – Gaston	5 – Sumner	Cintas Center (10,348); Cincinnati, OH
Jan 22, 2017; 2:00 pm, CBS	No. 22	Georgetown	W 86–75	14–5 (4–3)	24 – Bluiett	7 – Sumner	7 – Sumner	Cintas Center (10,343); Cincinnati, OH
Jan 26, 2017*; 7:00 pm, ESPN2	No. 24	at No. 19 Cincinnati; Crosstown Shootout	L 78–86	14–6	40 – Bluiett	7 – Macura	7 – Sumner	Fifth Third Arena (13,477); Cincinnati, OH
Jan 29, 2017; 6:00 pm, FS1	No. 24	at St. John's	W 82–77	15–6 (5–3)	21 – Bluiett	10 – Bluiett	7 – Sumner	Madison Square Garden (8,723); New York, NY
Feb 1, 2017; 9:00 pm, FS1		Seton Hall	W 72–70	16–6 (6–3)	24 – Bluiett	8 – Gates	7 – Goodin	Cintas Center (10,087); Cincinnati, OH
Feb 4, 2017; 3:00 pm, FOX		at No. 22 Creighton	W 82–80	17–6 (7–3)	16 – Tied	9 – Gates	5 – Goodin	CenturyLink Center (17,886); Omaha, NE
Feb 8, 2017; 6:30 pm, FS1	No. 24	DePaul	W 72–61	18–6 (8–3)	20 – Bluiett	10 – Gates	8 – Goodin	Cintas Center (10,250); Cincinnati, OH
Feb 11, 2017; 2:30 pm, FOX	No. 24	No. 2 Villanova	L 57–73	18–7 (8–4)	23 – Gaston	10 – Gaston	7 – Macura	Cintas Center (10,558); Cincinnati, OH
Feb 15, 2017; 6:30 pm, FS1		at Providence	L 63–75	18–8 (8–5)	19 – Gaston	14 – Gaston	4 – Macura	Dunkin' Donuts Center (10,102); Providence, RI
Feb 18, 2017; 8:00 pm, CBSSN		at Marquette	L 61–83	18–9 (8–6)	14 – O'Mara	10 – Gaston	8 – Goodin	BMO Harris Bradley Center (19,033); Milwaukee, WI
Feb 22, 2017; 7:00 pm, FS1		at Seton Hall	L 64–71	18–10 (8–7)	22 – Macura	7 – Gates	8 – Goodin	Prudential Center (7,139); Newark, NJ
Feb 26, 2017; 3:30 pm, FS1		No. 22 Butler	L 79–88	18–11 (8–8)	21 – Bluiett	5 – Goodin	7 – Goodin	Cintas Center (10,312); Cincinnati, OH
Mar 1, 2017; 9:00 pm, FS1		Marquette	L 84–95	18–12 (8–9)	20 – Macura	7 – Gaston	5 – Tied	Cintas Center (10,071); Cincinnati, OH
Mar 4, 2017; 2:00 pm, FSN		at DePaul	W 76–65	19–12 (9–9)	24 – Bluiett	10 – Bluiett	3 – Tied	Allstate Arena (6,774); Rosemont, IL
Big East tournament
Mar 8, 2017; 9:30 pm, FS1	(7)	vs. (10) DePaul; First Round	W 75–64	20–12	17 – Bluiett	9 – Bluiett	6 – Macura	Madison Square Garden (14,830); New York, NY
Mar 9, 2017; 9:30 pm, FS1	(7)	vs. (2) No. 18 Butler; Quarterfinals	W 62–57	21–12	23 – Bluiett	10 – Bernard	4 – Tied	Madison Square Garden (16,003); New York, NY
Mar 10, 2017; 9:30 pm, FS1	(7)	vs. (6) Creighton; Semifinals	L 72–75	21–13	22 – Macura	6 – Gaston	4 – Tied	Madison Square Garden (19,812); New York, NY
NCAA tournament
Mar 16, 2017*; 6:50 pm, TNT	(11 W)	vs. (6 W) Maryland; First Round	W 76–65	22–13	21 – Bluiett	6 – Bernard	9 – Goodin	Amway Center (15,869); Orlando, FL
Mar 18, 2017*; 6:10 pm, TNT	(11 W)	vs. (3 W) No. 16 Florida State; Second Round	W 91–66	23–13	29 – Bluiett	6 – Bluiett	5 – Tied	Amway Center (17,308); Orlando, FL
Mar 23, 2017*; 10:09 pm, TBS	(11 W)	vs. (2 W) No. 4 Arizona; Sweet Sixteen	W 73–71	24–13	25 – Bluiett	7 – Macura	5 – Macura	SAP Center (16,884); San Jose, CA
Mar 25, 2017*; 6:09 pm, TBS	(11 W)	vs. (1 W) No. 2 Gonzaga; Elite Eight	L 59–83	24–14	18 – Macura	7 – Tied	2 – Tied	SAP Center (17,011); San Jose, CA
*Non-conference game. ^{#}Rankings from AP Poll. (#) Tournament seedings in parentheses. W=West Region. All times are in Eastern Time.

== Rankings ==
Ranking movements Legend: ██ Increase in ranking ██ Decrease in ranking — = Not ranked RV = Received votes
	Week																			
Poll	Pre	1	2	3	4	5	6	7	8	9	10	11	12	13	14	15	16	17	18	Final
AP	7	11	9	7	13	17	17	17	16	15	22	24	RV	24	RV	RV	—	—	—	Not released
Coaches	8	10	8	7	14	17	17	17	15	14	19	22	25	25	—	RV	RV	—	—	18

*AP does not release post-NCAA tournament rankings
