= Electrical Engineering School, Tuzla =

Coordinates: 44.540578°N 18.664667°E

Elektrotehnička Škola Tuzla
- Muhameda Hevaija Uskufija 2 Tuzla; Bosnia and Herzegovina

Information
- Type: Public, Co-educational
- Founded: 1970
- Principal: Mirnes Avdić
- Teaching staff: 55
- Enrollment: 850
- Average class size: 25
- Language: Bosnian, Croatian, Serbian
- Website: https://www.etstuzla.edu.ba

The Electrical Engineering School of Tuzla is a high school located in Tuzla, Bosnia. It was founded in 1970. Its goal as an institution is to join all professions related to electrical engineering in one school. Before it opened its doors in 1970, these trades were represented by two separate schools.

The Electrical Engineering School of Tuzla is dedicated to teaching their students the latest about electricity and technology. The school also houses high-tech electrical equipment which provides more opportunities for students to do practical work. Students may choose between many courses such as Computer Technician, Technician of Mechatronics, Technician of Electroenergetics, Technician of Electronics, Electrician of telecommunications, Car electrician and Electrician. The school plans to shift to solar panel energy by the summer of 2019, which will open up a new available course: technician of renewable energy sources.
