= Justin Jackson (basketball, born 1997) =

Canadian basketball player (born 1997)

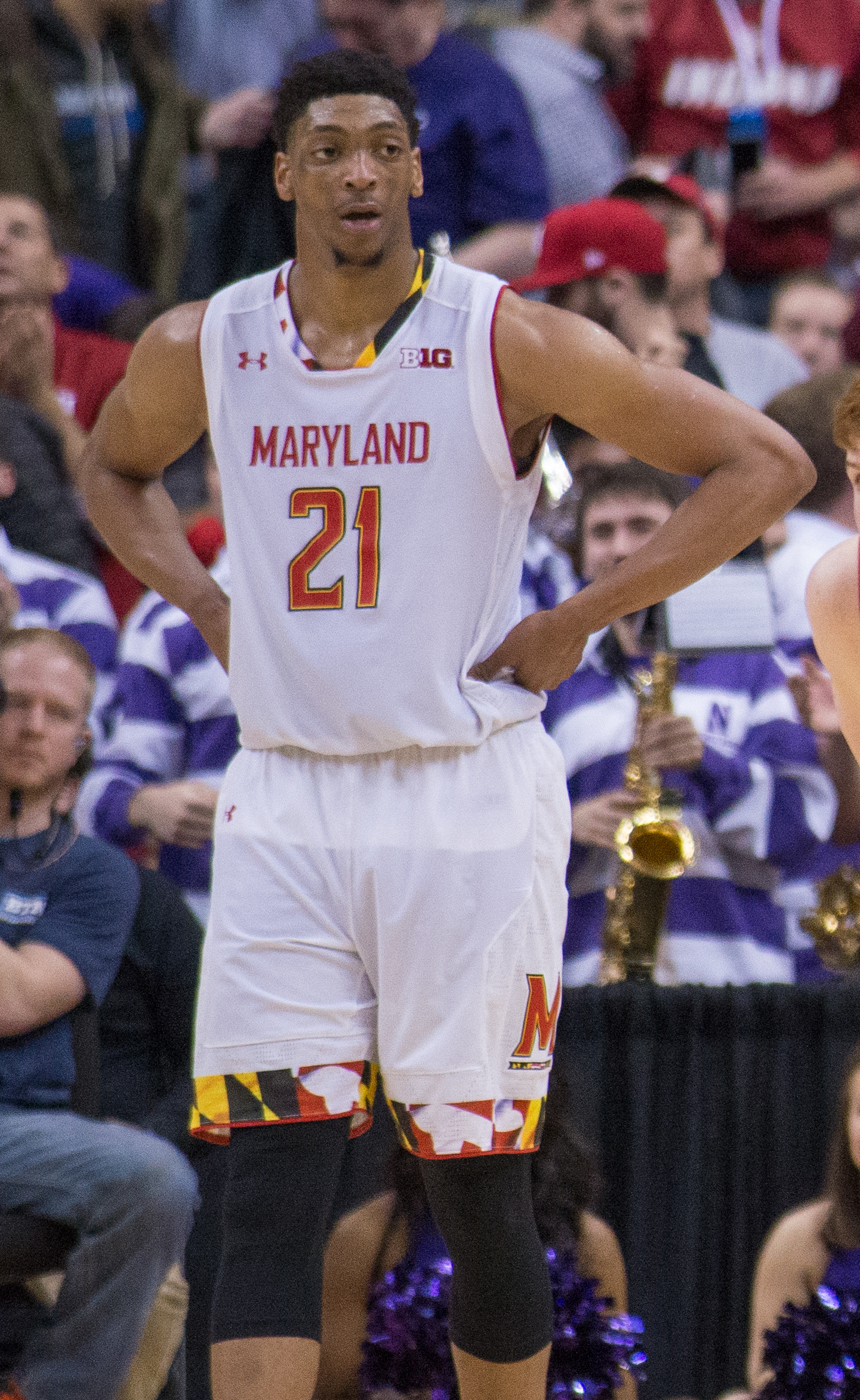

No. 15 – Ottawa BlackJacks
- Position: Power forward / small forward
- League: CEBL

Personal information
- Born: February 18, 1997 (age 29) Toronto, Ontario, Canada
- Listed height: 6 ft 7 in (2.01 m)
- Listed weight: 225 lb (102 kg)

Career information
- High school: Findlay Prep (Henderson, Nevada); Hill Academy (Brantford, Ontario)
- College: Maryland (2016–2018)
- NBA draft: 2018: 2nd round, 43rd overall pick
- Drafted by: Denver Nuggets
- Playing career: 2018–present

Career history
- 2018–2021: Lakeland Magic
- 2021: Guelph Nighthawks
- 2021–2022: Long Island Nets
- 2023: Calgary Surge
- 2024: Grand Rapids Gold
- 2024–2025: Calgary Surge
- 2025–2026: Windy City Bulls
- 2025–present: Ottawa BlackJacks

Career highlights
- NBA G League champion (2021)
- Stats at Basketball Reference

Justin Nicholas Jackson (born February 18, 1997) is a Canadian professional basketball player for the Ottawa BlackJacks of the Canadian Elite Basketball League (CEBL). He played college basketball for the Maryland Terrapins and was selected in the second round of the 2018 NBA draft.

== High school career ==
Born in Toronto, Ontario, Jackson attended Findlay Prep in Henderson, Nevada. In his junior year, he along with Allonzo Trier, played in the 2015 Dick's Sporting Goods High School National s at Christ the King Regional High School in Middle Village, Queens, New York. Findlay Prep entered the tournament as the #8 ranked team. On April 3, 2015, Findlay Prep would lose to Ben Simmons and #2 ranked Montverde Academy (57–53) in overtime in the semi-finals of the Tournament. On the season Jackson averaged 14.1 points, 7.1 rebounds per game, and 2.2 steals per game while leading the Pilots to a (29–2) overall record. During the spring and summer of 2015, Jackson competed on the Under Armour Association Circuit for the AAU team, Canada Elite. Jackson and current NBA player Thon Maker led Canada Elite to the Under Armour Association 17u championship game in Suwanee, Georgia. Canada Elite would lose to Team Charlotte (56–46) in the Championship game. Jackson participated in the NBPA Top 100 camp on June 22, 2015, at John Paul Jones Arena in Virginia. After his junior season concluded, Jackson transferred to Hill Academy in Vaughan, Ontario. As a senior, he was named a First Team all-star of the Ontario Scholastic Basketball Association in 2016.

== College career ==
Jackson was rated a four-star recruit and ranked as a consensus top-40 recruit in the Class of 2016 according to ESPN. On May 27, 2016, Jackson committed to the University of Maryland. In his freshman season at Maryland he averaged, 10.5 points and 6.0 rebounds per game. After the season he declared for the 2017 NBA draft, but later withdrew his name.

On May 24, 2017, Jackson announced he will return to Maryland for his sophomore season. On December 28, 2017, it was announced that Jackson suffered a torn labrum in his right shoulder. He missed the remainder of the season. In just 11 games, Jackson averaged 9.8 points, 8.1 rebounds, and 1.9 assists per game. After the end of the season, Jackson would declare his permanent entry for the 2018 NBA draft on March 28, 2018.

== Professional career ==
=== Lakeland Magic (2018–2021) ===
On June 21, 2018, Jackson was drafted by the Denver Nuggets with the 43rd overall pick in the 2018 NBA draft. He was subsequently traded to the Orlando Magic. On October 23, 2018, Jackson was included in the training camp roster of the Lakeland Magic. On January 9, 2019, the Lakeland Magic announced that Jackson had suffered from a season-ending injury.

On October 28, 2019, Jackson was included in the training camp roster of the Lakeland Magic. On November 5, 2019, Jackson was included in the opening night roster of the Lakeland Magic. He never suited up during the 2019–20 season due to the Achilles injury.

On April 22, 2020, Jackson signed with the Hamilton Honey Badgers, becoming the first NBA draftee to sign in the Canadian Elite Basketball League. Jackson was later included in the training camp roster for the Hamilton Honey Badgers, although he never played a game for the team.

On January 24, 2021, Jackson returned to the Lakeland Magic, where he would win the G League championship. In 11 games, he averaged 3.6 points, 2.0 rebounds and 0.7 steals on 11.5 minutes.

=== Guelph Nighthawks (2021) ===
On April 6, 2021, Jackson signed with the Guelph Nighthawks of the Canadian Elite Basketball League, where he played five games.

=== Long Island Nets (2021–2022) ===
On October 15, 2021, the Long Island Nets announced that they had acquired the returning rights for Jackson from the Lakeland Magic in a five-team trade along with returning rights of Devontae Cacok for the returning rights for B.J. Johnson and a first-round draft pick in 2021 NBA G League draft. On October 25, 2021, Jackson was included in the training camp roster of the Long Island Nets. However, he was waived on January 18, 2022, after suffering a season-ending injury.

=== Calgary Surge (2023) ===
On May 9, 2023, Jackson signed with the Calgary Surge of the Canadian Elite Basketball League.

On October 30, 2023, Jackson joined the Rip City Remix of the NBA G League, but was waived on November 4.

=== Grand Rapids Gold (2024) ===
On February 26, 2024, Jackson joined the Grand Rapids Gold.

=== Return to Calgary (2024) ===
On May 2, 2024, Jackson returned to the Calgary Surge.

=== Ottawa BlackJacks (2025–present) ===
On May 8, 2025, the Ottawa BackJacks announced that Jackson had been included in their training camp roster for the 2025 CEBL season.

== Career statistics ==
Legend
GP	Games played	GS	Games started	MPG	Minutes per game
FG%	Field goal percentage	3P%	3-point field goal percentage	FT%	Free throw percentage
RPG	Rebounds per game	APG	Assists per game	SPG	Steals per game
BPG	Blocks per game	PPG	Points per game	**Bold**	Career high

=== NBA G League ===
==== Regular season ====
Year	Team	GP	GS	MPG	FG%	3P%	FT%	RPG	APG	SPG	BPG	PPG
2018–19	Lakeland	10	**4**	18.1	.340	.207	.714	3.9	**.7**	.6	.3	4.5
2020–21	Lakeland	**11**	3	11.5	.300	.227	.857	2.0	.5	.7	**.4**	3.5
2021–22	Long Island	7	1	**23.3**	**.518**	**.457**	**1.000**	**6.0**	.4	**1.7**	**.4**	**11.1**
Career		28	8	16.8	.397	.314	.813	3.7	.6	.9	.4	5.8

=== College ===
Year	Team	GP	GS	MPG	FG%	3P%	FT%	RPG	APG	SPG	BPG	PPG
2016–17	Maryland	**33**	**30**	27.8	**.438**	**.438**	.698	6.0	.9	**.9**	**.8**	**10.5**
2017–18	Maryland	11	10	**29.4**	.366	.250	**.828**	**8.1**	**1.9**	.8	**.8**	9.8
Career		44	40	28.2	.418	.386	.728	6.5	1.2	.9	.8	10.3
