= 2016–17 DePaul Blue Demons men's basketball team =

American college basketball season

2016–17 DePaul Blue Demons men's basketball
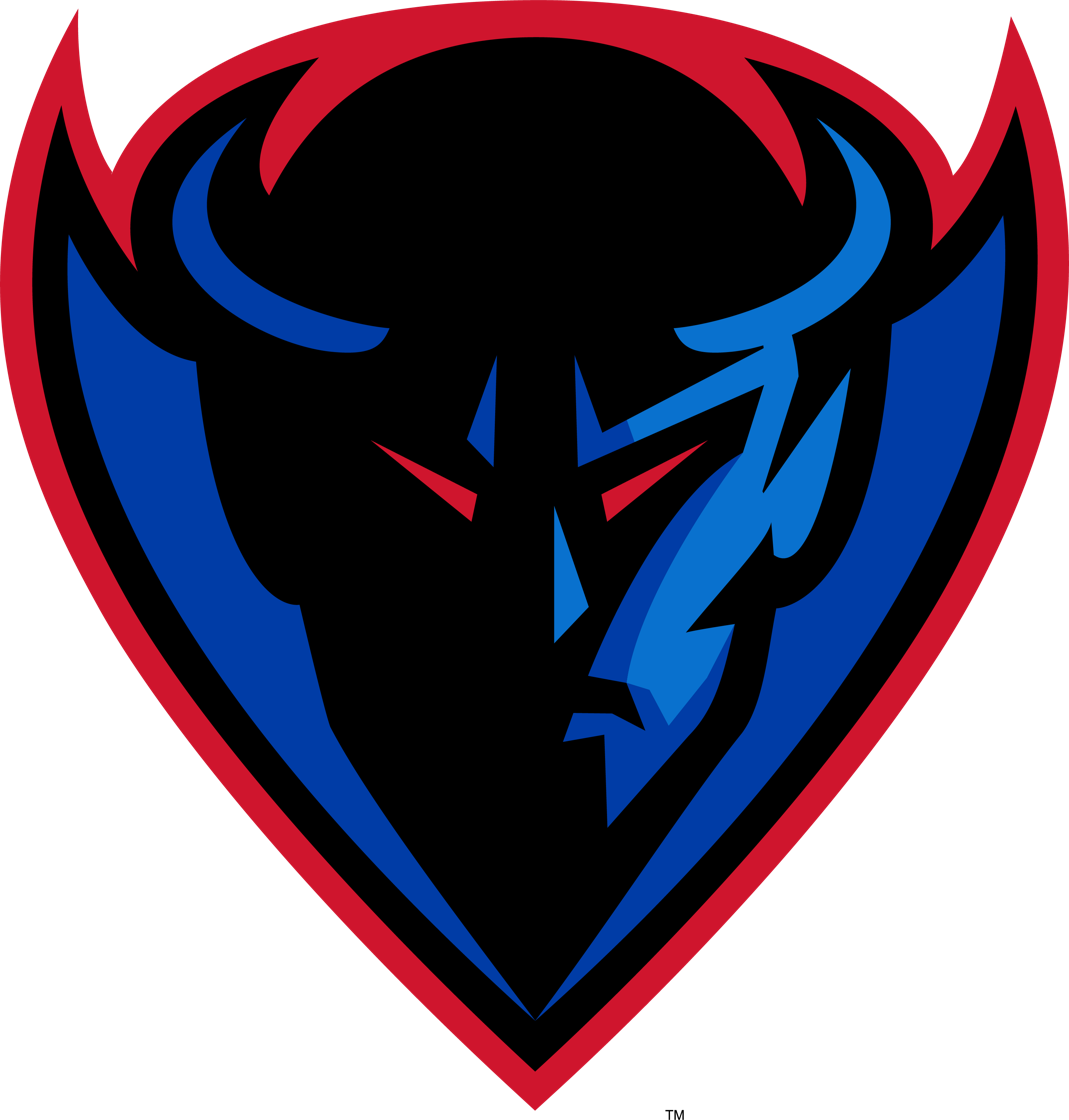

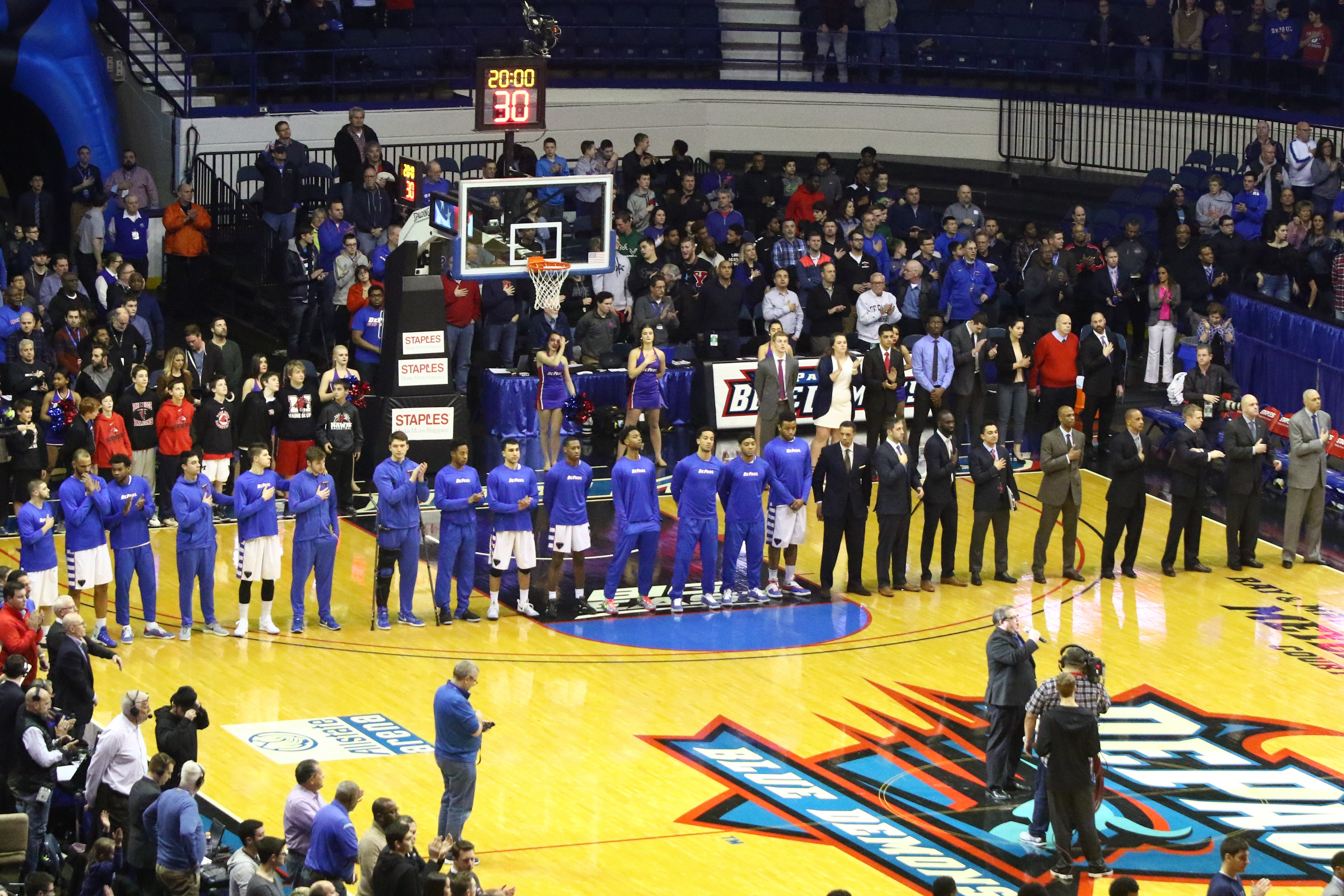
- Conference: Big East Conference
- Record: 9–23 (2–16 Big East)
- Head coach: Dave Leitao (2nd straight, 5th overall season)
- Assistant coaches: Rick Carter; Billy Garrett; Patrick Sellers
- Home arena: Allstate Arena; McGrath–Phillips Arena

2016–17 Big East men's basketball standings
	Conf.				Overall
Team	W		L	PCT	W		L	PCT
No. 1 Villanova †	15	–	3	.833	32	–	4	.889
No. 21 Butler	12	–	6	.667	25	–	9	.735
Creighton	10	–	8	.556	25	–	10	.714
Seton Hall	10	–	8	.556	21	–	12	.636
Providence	10	–	8	.556	20	–	13	.606
Marquette	10	–	8	.556	19	–	13	.594
Xavier	9	–	9	.500	24	–	14	.632
St. John's	7	–	11	.389	14	–	19	.424
Georgetown	5	–	13	.278	14	–	18	.438
DePaul	2	–	16	.111	9	–	23	.281
† 2017 Big East tournament winner Rankings from AP poll

The 2016–17 DePaul Blue Demons men's basketball team represented DePaul University during the 2016–17 NCAA Division I men's basketball season. They played almost all of their home games at Allstate Arena in the Chicago suburb of Rosemont, Illinois, though they scheduled two regular-season games at the considerably smaller McGrath–Phillips Arena, the regular home of the DePaul women's team, on the school's Chicago campus. The Blue Demons, members of the Big East Conference, were led by head coach Dave Leitao, in the second year of his current tenure and fifth overall at DePaul. They finished the season 9–23, 2–16 in Big East play to finish in last place. They lost in the first round of the Big East tournament to Xavier.

The season marked the Blue Demons' final season at Allstate Arena. DePaul moved both its men's and women's teams into the new Wintrust Arena on Chicago's Near South Side. The Blue Demons opened the arena with a game against Notre Dame on November 11, 2017.

== Previous season ==
The Blue Demons finished the 2015–16 season 9–22, 3–15 in Big East play to finish in ninth place. They lost to Georgetown in the first round of the Big East tournament.

== Offseason ==
=== Departures ===
Name	Number	Pos.	Height	Weight	Year	Hometown	Notes
Tommy Hamilton IV	2	C	6'11"	255	Junior	Chicago, IL	Left the team for personal reasons
Rashaun Stimage	3	F	6'8"	217	Senior	Chicago, IL	Graduated
Myke Henry	4	F	6'6"	228	RS Senior	Chicago, IL	Graduated
David Molinari	10	G	6'0"	185	Senior	Peoria, IL	Graduated
Develle Phillips	12	F	6'9"	210	Senior	Bowie, MD	Transferred to Odessa College
Cory Dolins	13	G	6'0"	182	Senior	Northbrook, IL	Graduated
Frederick Scott	14	F	6'7"	235	Freshman	Munster, IN	Transferred to Rider
Aaron Simpson	15	G	5'11"	152	Senior	North Chicago, IL	Graduated
Oumar Barry	25	F	6'10"	226	Freshman	Camp Springs, MD	Transferred to Iowa Western CC

=== Incoming transfers ===
Name	Number	Pos.	Height	Weight	Year	Hometown	Previous School
Austin Grandstaff	2	G	6'4"	188	Sophomore	Rockwall, TX	Transferred from Ohio State. Under NCAA transfer rules, Grandstaff will have to sit out the 2016–17 season. Will have three years of remaining eligibility.
Tre'Darius McCallum	10	F	6'7"	215	Junior	Myrtle Beach, SC	Junior college transferred from Indian Hills Community College.
Max Strus	31	G	6'6"	215	Junior	Hickory Hills, IL	Transferred from Lewis. Under NCAA transfer rules, Strus will have to sit out the 2016–17 season. Will have two years of remaining eligibility.
Chris Harrison-Docks	51	G	6'0"	175	RS Senior	Okemos, MI	Transferred from Western Kentucky. Harrison-Docks will be eligible to play immediately since Harrison-Docks graduated from Western Kentucky.

=== 2016 recruiting class ===
College recruiting
Name	Hometown	School	Height	Weight	Commit date
Al Eichelberger #52 PF	Saginaw, MI	Saginaw High School	6 ft 7 in (2.01 m)	225 lb (102 kg)	Nov 9, 2015
Al Eichelberger #52 PF	Recruit ratings: Scout: Rivals: 247Sports: ESPN:				
Brandon Cyrus #51 SG	La Porte, IN	La Lumiere School	6 ft 4 in (1.93 m)	190 lb (86 kg)	Nov 10, 2015
Brandon Cyrus #51 SG	Recruit ratings: Scout: Rivals: 247Sports: ESPN:				
Devin Gage; PG	Chicago, IL	Curie High School	6 ft 2 in (1.88 m)	190 lb (86 kg)	Jun 19, 2015
Devin Gage; PG	Recruit ratings: Scout: Rivals: 247Sports: ESPN:				
Levi Cook; C	Arnett, WV	Elev8 Basketball Academy	6 ft 9 in (2.06 m)	260 lb (120 kg)	Apr 5, 2016
Levi Cook; C	Recruit ratings: Scout: Rivals: 247Sports: ESPN:				
Overall recruit ranking:
Note: In many cases, Scout, Rivals, 247Sports, On3, and ESPN may conflict in their listings of height and weight.; In these cases, the average was taken. ESPN grades are on a 100-point scale.; Sources: "2016 DePaul Signees". Rivals.; "2016 DePaul Signees". ESPN.; "2016 Team Ranking". Rivals.

=== 2017 recruiting class ===
College recruiting (2017)
Name	Hometown	School	Height	Weight	Commit date
Justin Roberts #31 PG	Indianapolis, IN	Pike High School	5 ft 10 in (1.78 m)	170 lb (77 kg)	Jun 13, 2016
Justin Roberts #31 PG	Recruit ratings: Scout: Rivals: 247Sports: ESPN:				
Overall recruit ranking:
Note: In many cases, Scout, Rivals, 247Sports, On3, and ESPN may conflict in their listings of height and weight.; In these cases, the average was taken. ESPN grades are on a 100-point scale.; Sources: "2017 DePaul Signees". Rivals.; "2017 DePaul Signees". ESPN.; "2017 Team Ranking". Rivals.

=== 2018 recruiting class ===
College recruiting (2018)
Name	Hometown	School	Height	Weight	Commit date
John Diener; SG	Cedarburg, WI	Cedarburg High School	6 ft 4 in (1.93 m)	170 lb (77 kg)	May 4, 2016
John Diener; SG	Recruit ratings: Scout: Rivals: 247Sports: ESPN:				
Overall recruit ranking:
Note: In many cases, Scout, Rivals, 247Sports, On3, and ESPN may conflict in their listings of height and weight.; In these cases, the average was taken. ESPN grades are on a 100-point scale.; Sources: "2018 DePaul Signees". Rivals.; "2018 DePaul Signees". ESPN.; "2018 Team Ranking". Rivals.

== Preseason ==
Prior to the season, DePaul was picked to finish last in a poll of Big East coaches.

== Roster ==
2016–17 DePaul Blue Demons men's basketball team
Players
Coaches

Pos.	#	Name	Height	Weight	Year	Previous school	Hometown
G	0	R. J. Curington	6 ft 5 in (1.96 m)	199 lb (90 kg)	Sr	Oak Hill Academy	Dyer, IN
G	1	Darrick Wood	6 ft 5 in (1.96 m)	178 lb (81 kg)	Sr	Bridgton Academy; Hutchinson CC	Alexandria, VA
G	2	Austin Grandstaff (I) (redshirt)	6 ft 2 in (1.88 m)	190 lb (86 kg)	So	Rockwall; Ohio State	Rockwall, TX
G	3	Brandon Cyrus	6 ft 5 in (1.96 m)	187 lb (85 kg)	Fr	La Lumiere School	Toronto, ON
G	4	Devin Gage	6 ft 2 in (1.88 m)	177 lb (80 kg)	Fr	Curie	Chicago, IL
G	5	Billy Garrett Jr.	6 ft 6 in (1.98 m)	210 lb (95 kg)	Sr	Morgan Park	Chicago, IL
F	10	Tre'Darius McCallum	6 ft 7 in (2.01 m)	207 lb (94 kg)	Jr	St. James; Indian Hills CC	Myrtle Beach, SC
G	11	Eli Cain	6 ft 6 in (1.98 m)	200 lb (91 kg)	So	St. Benedict's Prep	Willingboro, NJ
G	12	Erten Gazi	6 ft 4 in (1.93 m)	212 lb (96 kg)	So	Istanbul Bostanci Doga College	Northern Cyprus
F	23	Al Eichelberger	6 ft 7 in (2.01 m)	251 lb (114 kg)	Fr	Saginaw	Saginaw, MI
F	30	Peter Ryckbosch	6 ft 10 in (2.08 m)	234 lb (106 kg)	RS Sr	St. Ignatius	Chicago, IL
G	31	Max Strus (I) (redshirt)	6 ft 6 in (1.98 m)	205 lb (93 kg)	Jr	Amos Alonzo Stagg; Lewis University	Hickory Hills, IL
F	32	David Leitao III (W)	6 ft 5 in (1.96 m)	221 lb (100 kg)	Sr	Rock Bridge; Peru State College	Virginia Beach, VA
F	33	Joe Hanel (W)	6 ft 7 in (2.01 m)	218 lb (99 kg)	Jr	Holy Family Catholic	Savage, MN
C	44	Levi Cook	6 ft 10 in (2.08 m)	300 lb (136 kg)	Fr	8 Sports Institute	Clarksburg, WV
G	51	Chris Harrison-Docks	5 ft 10 in (1.78 m)	189 lb (86 kg)	RS Sr	Okemos; Western Kentucky	Okemos, MI

Head coach

- Dave Leitao (Northeastern)

Assistant coach(es)

- Rick Carter (Michigan State)
- Billy Garrett (Indianapolis)
- Patrick Sellers (Central Connecticut State)

Legend

- (C) Team captain
- (S) Suspended
- (I) Ineligible
- (W) Walk-on
- Injured
- Current redshirt

Roster

== Schedule and results ==
Date time, TV	Rank^{#}	Opponent^{#}	Result	Record	High points	High rebounds	High assists	Site (attendance) city, state
Exhibition
Nov 4, 2016*; 8:00 pm		Rockhurst	W 79–53		26 – Garrett Jr.	11 – Cook	4 – Garrett Jr.	McGrath–Phillips Arena (1,615); Chicago, IL
Non-conference regular season
Nov 13, 2016*; 6:00 pm, FS1		Robert Morris	W 78–72	1–0	21 – Cain	8 – McCallum	6 – McCallum	McGrath–Phillips Arena (2,330); Chicago, IL
Nov 17, 2016*; 7:30 pm, FS1		Rutgers; Gavitt Tipoff Games	L 59–66	1–1	24 – Cain	9 – McCallum	4 – McCallum	Allstate Arena (4,057); Rosemont, IL
Nov 20, 2016*; 12:30 pm, FS1		Milwaukee	W 77–59	2–1	20 – Garrett Jr.	6 – Garrett Jr.	6 – Garrett Jr.	Allstate Arena (4,518); Rosemont, IL
Nov 23, 2016*; 7:00 pm, FSN/WCIU		Missouri State	W 68–66	3–1	23 – Garrett Jr.	12 – McCallum	3 – Garrett Jr.	Allstate Arena (4,387); Rosemont, IL
Nov 30, 2016*; 7:30 pm, FSN/WCIU		Drake	W 77–75	4–1	19 – Cain	8 – Cyrus	4 – Tied	Allstate Arena (2,091); Rosemont, IL
Dec 3, 2016*; 6:00 pm, BTN		at Northwestern	L 64–80	4–2	15 – Wood	8 – Wood	3 – Garrett Jr.	Welsh-Ryan Arena (6,751); Evanston, IL
Dec 6, 2016*; 8:00 pm, FSN/WCIU		Lamar	W 80–61	5–2	21 – Cain	10 – McCallum	2 – Tied	Allstate Arena (4,516); Rosemont, IL
Dec 10, 2016*; 11:00 am, ESPNU		vs. Temple; Hoophall Miami Invitational	L 65–74	5–3	17 – Cain	7 – Cain	2 – Cain	American Airlines Arena (2,152); Miami, FL
Dec 14, 2016*; 7:00 pm, FS1		UIC	L 75–80	5–4	27 – Cain	12 – Hanel	3 – Garrett Jr.	McGrath–Phillips Arena (2,099); Chicago, IL
Dec 17, 2016*; 1:00 pm, FS1		Chicago State; Las Vegas Classic	W 109–61	6–4	31 – Cain	12 – McCallum	5 – Garrett Jr.	Allstate Arena (4,592); Rosemont, IL
Dec 19, 2016*; 8:00 pm, FS1		Southeast Missouri State; Las Vegas Classic	W 81–78	7–4	19 – Garrett Jr.	8 – Hanel	8 – Garrett Jr.	Allstate Arena (4,377); Rosemont, IL
Dec 22, 2016*; 7:00 pm, FS1		vs. Wyoming; Las Vegas Classic semifinals	L 58–72	7–5	18 – McCallum	6 – McCallum	1 – 4 tied	Orleans Arena; Paradise, NV
Dec 23, 2016*; 7:30 pm, FS1		vs. Missouri State; Las Vegas Classic 3rd place game	L 58–69	7–6	16 – Garrett Jr.	7 – McCallum	3 – Cain	Orleans Arena; Paradise, NV
Big East Conference regular season
Dec 28, 2016; 5:30 pm, FS1		at No. 1 Villanova	L 65–68	7–7 (0–1)	19 – McCallum	7 – McCallum	4 – Tied	The Pavilion (6,500); Villanova, PA
Jan 1, 2017; 1:00 pm, FS1		St. John's	L 73–79	7–8 (0–2)	18 – Cain	9 – McCallum	3 – Tied	Allstate Arena (5,152); Rosemont, IL
Jan 7, 2017; 11:00 am, CBSSN		at Seton Hall	L 56–87	7–9 (0–3)	22 – Garrett Jr.	9 – Cyrus	1 – 4 tied	Prudential Center (7,797); Newark, NJ
Jan 10, 2017; 8:00 pm, FS1		Providence	W 64–63	8–9 (1–3)	14 – Garrett Jr.	8 – McCallum	5 – Garrett Jr.	Allstate Arena (4,641); Rosemont, IL
Jan 14, 2017; 1:00 pm, FSN/WCIU		at Marquette	L 58–83	8–10 (1–4)	12 – Garrett Jr.	6 – Hanel	3 – Cain	BMO Harris Bradley Center (13,832); Milwaukee, WI
Jan 16, 2017; 3:30 pm, FS1		at St. John's; MLK Day Marathon	L 68–78	8–11 (1–5)	16 – Garrett Jr.	10 – McCallum	5 – Tied	Carnesecca Arena (5,602); Queens, NY
Jan 21, 2017; 1:00 pm, FS1		No. 13 Butler	L 69–70 ^{OT}	8–12 (1–6)	32 – Cain	11 – McCallum	4 – Cain	Allstate Arena (6,713); Rosemont, IL
Jan 28, 2017; 1:30 pm, FS1		at No. 16 Creighton	L 66–83	8–13 (1–7)	18 – Garrett Jr.	9 – Hanel	5 – Cain	CenturyLink Center (17,611); Omaha, NE
Jan 31, 2017; 8:15 pm, FS1		Georgetown	L 73–76	8–14 (1–8)	25 – Garrett Jr.	6 – Tied	3 – Tied	Allstate Arena (5,455); Rosemont, IL
Feb 4, 2017; 1:00 pm, FS1		Marquette	L 79–92	8–15 (1–9)	21 – McCallum	7 – McCallum	7 – Cain	Allstate Arena (8,392); Rosemont, IL
Feb 8, 2017; 5:30 pm, FS1		at No. 24 Xavier	L 61–72	8–16 (1–10)	18 – Cyrus	6 – Cyrus	4 – Cain	Cintas Center (10,250); Cincinnati, OH
Feb 11, 2017; 1:00 pm, FS1		No. 23 Creighton	L 58–93	8–17 (1–1)	15 – Harrison-Docks	7 – Hanel	3 – Cain	Allstate Arena (6,409); Rosemont, IL
Feb 13, 2017; 8:00 pm, CBSSN		No. 2 Villanova	L 62–75	8–18 (1–12)	18 – Harrison-Docks	8 – Tied	3 – Tied	Allstate Arena (6,963); Rosemont, IL
Feb 19, 2017; 12:30 pm, FS1		at No. 24 Butler	L 66–82	8–19 (1–13)	24 – Cain	6 – Tied	3 – Cain	Hinkle Fieldhouse (9,100); Indianapolis, IN
Feb 22, 2017; 6:05 pm, CBSSN		at Georgetown	W 67–65	9–19 (2–13)	15 – Garrett Jr.	7 – McCallum	4 – Garrett Jr.	Verizon Center (7,896); Washington, D.C.
Feb 25, 2017; 1:00 pm, FSN/WCIU		Seton Hall	L 79–82	9–20 (2–14)	26 – Garrett Jr.	6 – Cain	6 – Garrett Jr.	Allstate Arena (5,144); Rosemont, IL
Feb 28, 2017; 7:30 pm, FS1		at Providence	L 64–73	9–21 (2–15)	12 – Tied	7 – McCallum	4 – Tied	Dunkin' Donuts Center (10,101); Providence, RI
Mar 4, 2017; 1:00 pm, FSN/WCIU		Xavier	L 65–79	9–22 (2–16)	17 – Garrett Jr.	7 – Tied	3 – Cain	Allstate Arena (6,774); Rosemont, IL
Big East tournament
Mar 8, 2017; 8:30 pm, FS1	(10)	vs. (7) Xavier; First round	L 64–75	9–23	16 – Garrett Jr.	11 – McCallum	4 – Garrett Jr.	Madison Square Garden (14,830); New York City, NY
*Non-conference game. ^{#}Rankings from AP Poll. (#) Tournament seedings in parentheses. All times are in Central Time.
