= 2017 Big East men's basketball tournament =

- Classification: Division I
- Season: 2016–17
- Teams: 10
- Site: Madison Square Garden; New York City
- Champions: Villanova Wildcats (3rd title)
- Winning coach: Jay Wright (2nd title)
- MVP: Josh Hart (Villanova)
- Television: FS1, FOX

2016–17 Big East men's basketball standings
	Conf.				Overall
Team	W		L	PCT	W		L	PCT
No. 1 Villanova †	15	–	3	.833	32	–	4	.889
No. 21 Butler	12	–	6	.667	25	–	9	.735
Creighton	10	–	8	.556	25	–	10	.714
Seton Hall	10	–	8	.556	21	–	12	.636
Providence	10	–	8	.556	20	–	13	.606
Marquette	10	–	8	.556	19	–	13	.594
Xavier	9	–	9	.500	24	–	14	.632
St. John's	7	–	11	.389	14	–	19	.424
Georgetown	5	–	13	.278	14	–	18	.438
DePaul	2	–	16	.111	9	–	23	.281
† 2017 Big East tournament winner Rankings from AP poll

The 2017 Big East men's basketball tournament was the postseason tournament men's basketball tournament for the Big East Conference. It was held from March 8 through March 11, 2017 at Madison Square Garden in New York City. The championship was won by Villanova who defeated Creighton in the championship game. The tournament win was Villanova's third all-time tournament championship and second in the prior three years. As a result, Villanova received the conference's automatic bid to the NCAA tournament.

== Seeds ==
All 10 Big East schools participated in the tournament. Teams were seeded by the conference record with tie-breaking procedures to determine the seeds for teams with identical conference records. The top six teams received first-round byes. Seeding for the tournament was determined at the close of the regular conference season.

Seed	School	Conference	Tiebreaker 1	Tiebreaker 2
1	Villanova	15–3		
2	Butler	12–6		
3	Providence	10–8	4–2 vs Marquette/Seton Hall/Creighton	
4	Marquette	10–8	3–3 vs. Providence/Seton Hall/Creighton	1–1 vs Villanova
5	Seton Hall	10–8	3–3 vs Providence/Marquette/Creighton	0–2 vs Villanova
6	Creighton	10–8	2–4 vs Providence/Marquette/Seton Hall	
7	Xavier	9–9		
8	St. John's	7–11		
9	Georgetown	5–13		
10	DePaul	2–16		

== Schedule ==
Game	Time*	Matchup	Score	Television	Attendance
First round – Wednesday, March 8
1	7:00 pm	No. 9 Georgetown vs. No. 8 St. John's	73–74	FS1	14,830
2	9:30 pm	No. 10 DePaul vs. No. 7 Xavier	64–75	FS1	14,830
Quarterfinals – Thursday, March 9
3	12:00 pm	No. 8 St. John's vs. No. 1 Villanova	67–108	FS1	17,324
4	2:30 pm	No. 5 Seton Hall vs. No. 4 Marquette	82–76	FS1	17,324
5	7:00 pm	No. 7 Xavier vs. No. 2 Butler	62–57	FS1	16,003
6	9:30 pm	No. 6 Creighton vs. No. 3 Providence	70–58	FS1	16,003
Semifinals – Friday, March 10
7	6:30 pm	No. 5 Seton Hall vs. No. 1 Villanova	53–55	FS1	19,812
8	9:30 pm	No. 7 Xavier vs. No. 6 Creighton	75–72	FS1	19,812
Championship – Saturday, March 11
9	5:30 pm	No. 6 Creighton vs. No. 1 Villanova	60–74	FOX	19,812
*Game times in Eastern Time. Tournament seed in parentheses. Rankings denote Associated Press Poll ranking.

== Bracket ==
First round March 8
8	St. John's	74
9	Georgetown	73
7	Xavier	75
10	DePaul	64

Quarterfinals; March 9
1	#2 Villanova	108
8	St. John's	67
4	Marquette	76
5	Seton Hall	82
2	#18 Butler	57
7	Xavier	62
3	Providence	58
6	Creighton	70

Semifinals; March 10
1	#2 Villanova	55
5	Seton Hall	53
7	Xavier	72
6	Creighton	75

Championship; March 11
1	#2 Villanova	74
6	Creighton	60

== All-Tournament team ==
- Trevon Bluiett, Xavier
- Jalen Brunson, Villanova
- Ángel Delgado, Seton Hall
- Marcus Foster, Creighton
- Josh Hart, Villanova
- Kris Jenkins, Villanova

Dave Gavitt Trophy (Most Outstanding Player)

- Josh Hart, Villanova

== See also ==
- 2017 Big East women's basketball tournament
