= 2016–17 Seton Hall Pirates men's basketball team =

American college basketball season

2016–17 Seton Hall Pirates men's basketball

NCAA tournament, First Round
- Conference: Big East Conference
- Record: 21–12 (10–8 Big East)
- Head coach: Kevin Willard (7th season)
- Assistant coaches: Shaheen Holloway; Fred Hill; Grant Billmeier
- Home arena: Prudential Center; Walsh Gymnasium

2016–17 Big East men's basketball standings
| | Conf. | | | | Overall |
| Team | W | | L | PCT | W | | L | PCT |
|---|---|---|---|---|---|---|---|---|
| No. 1 Villanova † | 15 | – | 3 | .833 | 32 | – | 4 | .889 |
| No. 21 Butler | 12 | – | 6 | .667 | 25 | – | 9 | .735 |
| Creighton | 10 | – | 8 | .556 | 25 | – | 10 | .714 |
| Seton Hall | 10 | – | 8 | .556 | 21 | – | 12 | .636 |
| Providence | 10 | – | 8 | .556 | 20 | – | 13 | .606 |
| Marquette | 10 | – | 8 | .556 | 19 | – | 13 | .594 |
| Xavier | 9 | – | 9 | .500 | 24 | – | 14 | .632 |
| St. John's | 7 | – | 11 | .389 | 14 | – | 19 | .424 |
| Georgetown | 5 | – | 13 | .278 | 14 | – | 18 | .438 |
| DePaul | 2 | – | 16 | .111 | 9 | – | 23 | .281 |
† 2017 Big East tournament winner Rankings from AP poll

The 2016–17 Seton Hall Pirates men's basketball team represented Seton Hall University in the 2016–17 NCAA Division I men's basketball season. The Pirates played home games in Newark, New Jersey at the Prudential Center, with one exhibition and one regular season game at Walsh Gymnasium in South Orange, New Jersey. They were coached, for the seventh year, by Kevin Willard. They were members of the Big East Conference. They finished the season 21–12, 10–8 in Big East play to finish in a four-way tie for third place. As the No. 5 seed in the Big East tournament, they defeated Marquette before losing to Villanova in the semifinals. They received an at-large bid to the NCAA tournament as a No. 9 seed in the South region where they lost to Arkansas in the first round.

== Previous season ==
The Pirates finished the 2015–16 season 25–9, 12–6 in Big East play to finish in third place. They defeated Creighton, Xavier, and Villanova to win the Big East tournament. As a result, they received the conference's automatic bid to the NCAA tournament where they lost in the first round to Gonzaga.

== Preseason ==
Prior to the season, Seton Hall was picked to finish in a tie for fourth place in a poll of Big East coaches. Khadeen Carrington and Angel Delgado were named to the preseason All-Big East second team.

== Departures ==
| Name | Number | Pos. | Height | Weight | Year | Hometown | Notes |
|---|---|---|---|---|---|---|---|
| Braeden Anderson | 4 | F | 6'9" | 240 | RS Junior | Okotoks, Alberta | Completed athletic eligibility; graduated from Fresno State in 2015 (ultimately graduated from Seton Hall Law in 2018) |
| Isaiah Whitehead | G | 15 | 6'4" | 210 | Sophomore | Brooklyn, NY | 42nd pick in 2016 NBA draft |
| Derrick Gordon | G | 32 | 6'3" | 205 | RS Senior | Plainfield, NJ | Graduated |
| Myles Carter | F | 23 | 6'9" | 220 | Sophomore | Chicago, IL | Dismissed (Mid-Season) |
| Veer Singh | F | 33 | 6'7" | 195 | Sophomore | New York, NY | Transferred (Mid-Season) |
| Jevon Thomas | G | 2 | 6'1" | 185 | Junior | Queens, NY | Transferred (Mid-Season) |

=== Incoming transfers ===
| Name | Number | Pos. | Height | Weight | Year | Hometown | Previous School |
|---|---|---|---|---|---|---|---|
| Madison Jones | G | 30 | 6'1" | 165 | Senior | Raleigh, NC | Transferred from Wake Forest. |

== Incoming recruits ==
College recruiting
| Name | Hometown | School | Height | Weight | Commit date |
|---|---|---|---|---|---|
| Myles Powell #19 SG | Trenton, NJ | South Kent School | 6 ft 2 in (1.88 m) | 195 lb (88 kg) | Sep 19, 2015 |
| Myles Powell #19 SG | Recruit ratings: Scout: Rivals: (82) | | | | |
| Eron Gordon #44 SG | Indianapolis, IN | Cathedral High School | 6 ft 3 in (1.91 m) | 175 lb (79 kg) | May 16, 2016 |
| Eron Gordon #44 SG | Recruit ratings: Scout: Rivals: (76) | | | | |
Overall recruit ranking:
Note: In many cases, Scout, Rivals, 247Sports, On3, and ESPN may conflict in their listings of height and weight.; In these cases, the average was taken. ESPN grades are on a 100-point scale.; Sources: "2016 Team Ranking". Rivals.

== Roster ==
2016–17 Seton Hall Pirates men's basketball team
Players
Coaches

| Pos. | # | Name | Height | Weight | Year | Previous school | Hometown |
|---|---|---|---|---|---|---|---|
| G | 0 | Khadeen Carrington | 6 ft 4 in (1.93 m) | 195 lb (88 kg) | Jr | Bishop Loughlin Memorial High School | Brooklyn, New York |
| F | 1 | Michael Nzei | 6 ft 8 in (2.03 m) | 205 lb (93 kg) | RS So | Our Savior New American School | Makurdi, Nigeria |
| G | 2 | Jevon Thomas | 6 ft 1 in (1.85 m) | 185 lb (84 kg) | RS Jr | Kansas State | Queens, New York |
| G | 4 | Eron Gordon | 6 ft 3 in (1.91 m) | 190 lb (86 kg) | Fr | Cathedral High School (IN) | Indianapolis, Indiana |
| G | 13 | Myles Powell | 6 ft 2 in (1.88 m) | 195 lb (88 kg) | Fr | Trenton Catholic Academy | Trenton, New Jersey |
| F | 14 | Ismael Sanogo | 6 ft 8 in (2.03 m) | 215 lb (98 kg) | Jr | East Side High School (NJ) | Newark, New Jersey |
| F | 20 | Desi Rodriguez | 6 ft 6 in (1.98 m) | 215 lb (98 kg) | Jr | Abraham Lincoln High School (NY) | Bronx, New York |
| G | 21 | Dalton Soffer | 6 ft 6 in (1.98 m) | 195 lb (88 kg) | So | Poway High School | San Diego, California |
| G | 22 | Michael Dowdy, Jr. (W) | 6 ft 0 in (1.83 m) | 190 lb (86 kg) | Sr | University of Chicago Laboratory High School | Chicago, Illinois |
| F | 23 | Myles Carter | 6 ft 9 in (2.06 m) | 220 lb (100 kg) | So | St. Rita of Cascia High School | Chicago, Illinois |
| F | 25 | Rashed Anthony | 6 ft 9 in (2.06 m) | 235 lb (107 kg) | RS Jr | Flora MacDonald Academy | Orangeburg, South Carolina |
| G | 30 | Madison Jones | 6 ft 2 in (1.88 m) | 160 lb (73 kg) | Sr | Wake Forest | Raleigh, North Carolina |
| F | 31 | Ángel Delgado | 6 ft 10 in (2.08 m) | 240 lb (109 kg) | Jr | St. Patrick High School (NJ) | Bajos de Haina, Dominican Republic |
| G | 35 | Manny Anderson (W) | 6 ft 4 in (1.93 m) | 190 lb (86 kg) | Fr | Worcester Academy | Franklin, New Jersey |

Head coach

- Kevin Willard (Pittsburgh)

Assistant coach(es)

- Shaheen Holloway (Seton Hall)
- Fred Hill (Montclair State)
- Grant Billmeier (Seton Hall)

Legend

- (C) Team captain
- (S) Suspended
- (I) Ineligible
- (W) Walk-on
- Injured
- Current redshirt

Roster

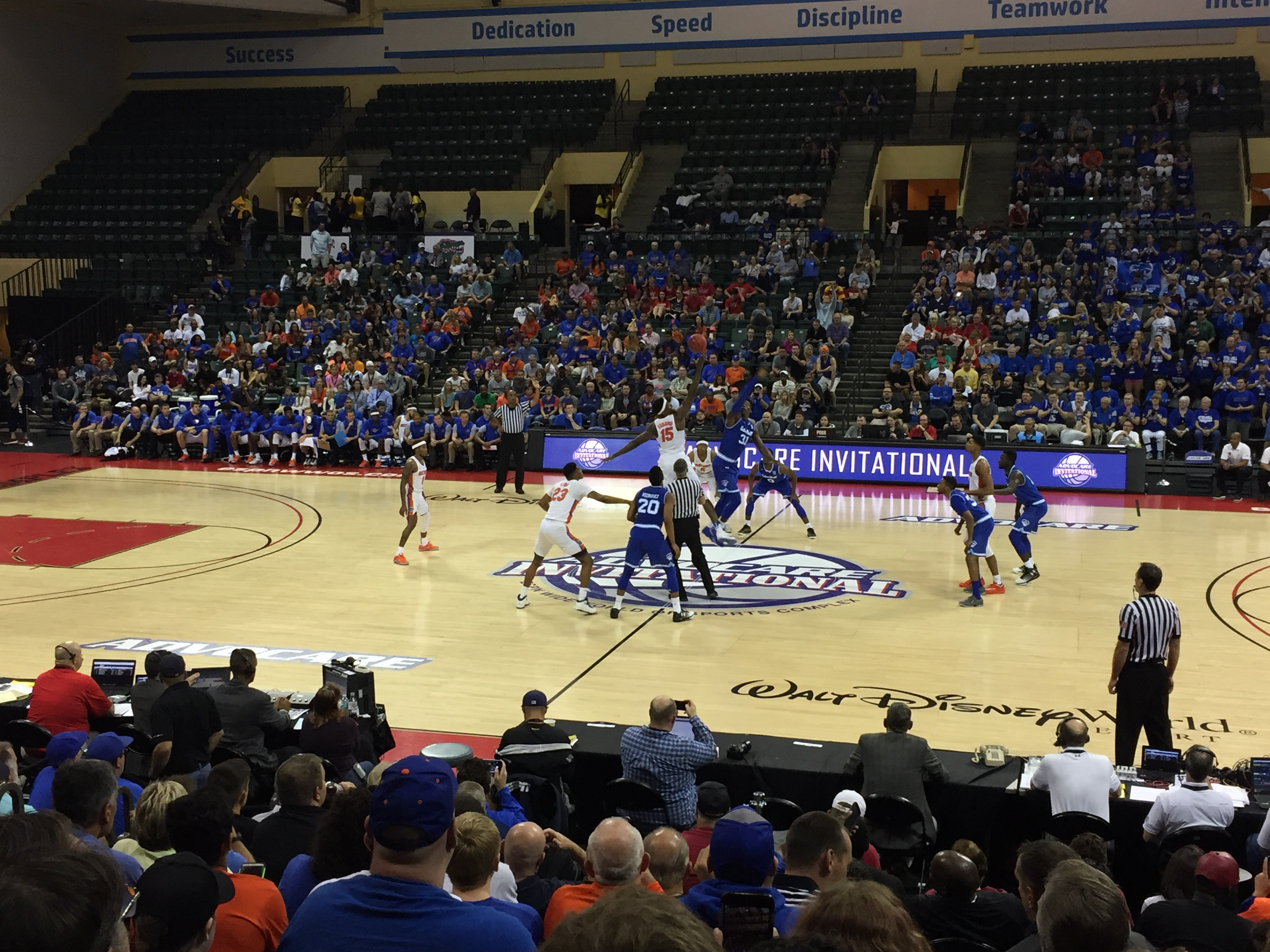
Tip off between the Florida Gators and the Seton Hall Pirates at the 2016 AdvoCare Invitational.

== Schedule and results ==
| Date time, TV | Rank^{#} | Opponent^{#} | Result | Record | High points | High rebounds | High assists | Site (attendance) city, state |
Non-conference regular season
| Nov 11, 2016*; 7:00 pm, FSN/YES | | Fairleigh Dickinson | W 91–70 | 1–0 | 27 – Carrington | 14 – Delgado | 10 – Jones | Walsh Gymnasium (1,856); South Orange, NJ |
| Nov 13, 2016*; 2:00 pm, FS1 | | Central Connecticut | W 82–58 | 2–0 | 18 – Carrington | 16 – Delgado | 4 – Carrington | Prudential Center (6,354); Newark, NJ |
| Nov 17, 2016*; 9:00 pm, BTN | | at Iowa; Gavitt Tipoff Games | W 91–83 | 3–0 | 26 – Powell | 11 – Delgado | 4 – Jones | Carver–Hawkeye Arena (10,391); Iowa City, IA |
| Nov 24, 2016*; 9:00 pm, ESPN2 | | vs. Florida; AdvoCare Invitational quarterfinals | L 76–81 | 3–1 | 28 – Carrington | 9 – Tied | 4 – Jones | HP Field House (1,949); Lake Buena Vista, FL |
| Nov 25, 2016*; 7:30 pm, ESPNU | | vs. Quinnipiac; AdvoCare Invitational consolation 2nd round | W 90–79 | 4–1 | 23 – Rodriguez | 12 – Nzei | 4 – Delgado | HP Field House; Lake Buena Vista, FL |
| Nov 27, 2016*; 7:00 pm, ESPNU | | vs. Stanford; AdvoCare Invitational 5th place game | L 52–66 | 4–2 | 20 – Carrington | 9 – Delgado | 2 – Jones | HP Field House (1,216); Lake Buena Vista, FL |
| Dec 1, 2016*; 7:00 pm, FS1 | | Columbia | W 95–71 | 5–2 | 21 – Powell | 11 – Delgado | 5 – Sanogo | Prudential Center (6,463); Newark, NJ |
| Dec 6, 2016*; 9:30 pm, FS1 | | vs. Hawaii; Pearl Harbor Basketball Invitational | W 68–57 | 6–2 | 19 – Carrington | 14 – Delgado | 2 – Tied | Bloch Arena (4,024); Honolulu, HI |
| Dec 7, 2016*; 7:00 pm, FS1 | | vs. California; Pearl Harbor Basketball Invitational | W 60–57 | 7–2 | 16 – Delgado | 12 – Delgado | 4 – Carrington | Bloch Arena (4,024); Honolulu, HI |
| Dec 12, 2016*; 9:00 pm, FS1 | | vs. No. 16 South Carolina; Under Armour Reunion | W 67–64 | 8–2 | 21 – Carrington | 12 – Tied | 3 – Jones | Madison Square Garden (7,558); New York City, NY |
| Dec 17, 2016*; 6:00 pm, FSN/YES | | Delaware | W 81–68 | 9–2 | 22 – Delgado | 15 – Delgado | 4 – Tied | Prudential Center (7,662); Newark, NJ |
| Dec 23, 2016*; 6:30 pm, FS1 | | Rutgers; Rivalry/Garden State Hardwood Classic | W 72–61 | 10–2 | 20 – Carrington | 16 – Delgado/Sanogo | 5 – Jones | Prudential Center (10,481); Newark, NJ |
Big East regular season
| Dec 28, 2016; 8:00 pm, FS2 | | at No. 10 Creighton | L 75–89 | 10–3 (0–1) | 27 – Carrington | 10 – Delgado | 3 – Carrington | CenturyLink Center (18,084); Omaha, NE |
| Jan 1, 2017; 4:30 pm, FS1 | | Marquette | W 69–66 | 11–3 (1–1) | 18 – Delgado | 12 – Delgado | 5 – Carrington | Prudential Center (7,894); Newark, NJ |
| Jan 7, 2017; 12:00 pm, CBSSN | | DePaul | W 87–56 | 12–3 (2–1) | 25 – Rodriguez | 12 – Delgado | 4 – Tied | Prudential Center (7,797); Newark, NJ |
| Jan 11, 2017; 7:00 pm, FS1 | | at Marquette | L 86–89 ^{OT} | 12–4 (2–2) | 30 – Rodriguez | 19 – Delgado | 9 – Jones | BMO Harris Bradley Center (12,388); Milwaukee, WI |
| Jan 14, 2017; 12:00 pm, FSN/YES | | at Providence | L 61–65 | 12–5 (2–3) | 20 – Rodriguez | 16 – Delgado | 5 – Carrington | Dunkin' Donuts Center (9,253); Providence, RI |
| Jan 16, 2017; 6:30 pm, FS1 | | at No. 1 Villanova; MLK Day Marathon | L 46–76 | 12–6 (2–4) | 15 – Rodriguez | 7 – Nzei | 2 – Carrington | The Pavilion (6,500); Villanova, PA |
| Jan 22, 2017; 12:00 pm, FS1 | | St. John's | W 86–73 | 13–6 (3–4) | 21 – Delgado | 20 – Delgado | 8 – Carrington | Prudential Center (9,801); Newark, NJ |
| Jan 25, 2017; 8:30 pm, FS1 | | No. 11 Butler | L 54–61 | 13–7 (3–5) | 12 – Tied | 22 – Delgado | 3 – Delgado | Prudential Center (7,009); Newark, NJ |
| Feb 1, 2017; 9:00 pm, FS1 | | at Xavier | L 70–72 | 13–8 (3–6) | 26 – Powell | 13 – Delgado | 9 – Jones | Cintas Center (10,250); Cincinnati, OH |
| Feb 4, 2017; 12:00 pm, FS1 | | at Georgetown | W 68–66 ^{OT} | 14–8 (4–6) | 26 – Delgado | 17 – Delgado | 2 – Carrington | Verizon Center (10,142); Washington, D.C. |
| Feb 8, 2017; 8:30 pm, FS1 | | Providence | W 72–70 ^{OT} | 15–8 (5–6) | 21 – Carrington | 15 – Delgado | 5 – Tied | Prudential Center (7,024); Newark, NJ |
| Feb 11, 2017; 12:00 pm, CBSSN | | at St. John's | L 70–78 | 15–9 (5–7) | 17 – Rodriguez | 12 – Nzei | 5 – Delgado | Madison Square Garden (9,027); New York City, NY |
| Feb 15, 2016; 8:00 pm, CBSSN | | No. 20 Creighton | W 87–81 | 16–9 (6–7) | 41 – Carrington | 17 – Delgado | 7 – Carrington | Prudential Center (6,637); Newark, NJ |
| Feb 18, 2017; 12:30 pm, FOX | | No. 2 Villanova | L 70–92 | 16–10 (6–8) | 22 – Carrington | 12 – Delgado | 4 – Jones | Prudential Center (16,733); Newark, NJ |
| Feb 22, 2017; 7:00 pm, FS1 | | Xavier | W 71–64 | 17–10 (7–8) | 25 – Delgado | 13 – Delgado | 5 – Carrington | Prudential Center (7,139); Newark, NJ |
| Feb 25, 2017; 2:00 pm, FSN/YES | | at DePaul | W 82–79 | 18–10 (8–8) | 19 – Rodriguez | 10 – Delgado | 6 – Carrington | Allstate Arena (5,144); Rosemont, IL |
| Feb 28, 2017; 6:30 pm, FS1 | | Georgetown | W 62–59 | 19–10 (9–8) | 27 – Rodriguez | 13 – Delgado | 3 – Tied | Prudential Center (8,500); Newark, NJ |
| Mar 4, 2017; 2:30 pm, FOX | | at No. 13 Butler | W 70–64 | 20–10 (10–8) | 21 – Rodriguez | 16 – Delgado | 4 – Delgado | Hinkle Fieldhouse (9,100); Indianapolis, IN |
Big East tournament
| Mar 9, 2017; 2:30 pm, FS1 | (5) | vs. (4) Marquette; Quarterfinals | W 82–76 | 21–10 | 19 – Carrington | 16 – Delgado | 9 – Delgado | Madison Square Garden (17,324); New York City, NY |
| Mar 10, 2017; 6:30 pm, FS1 | (5) | vs. (1) No. 2 Villanova; Semifinals | L 53–55 | 21–11 | 14 – Rodriguez | 8 – Delgado | 2 – Delgado | Madison Square Garden (19,812); New York City, NY |
NCAA tournament
| Mar 17, 2017; 1:30 pm, TNT | (9 S) | vs. (8 S) Arkansas; First Round | L 71–77 | 21–12 | 22 – Carrington | 13 – Delgado | 2 – Tied | Bon Secours Wellness Arena (14,179); Greenville, SC |
*Non-conference game. ^{#}Rankings from AP Poll. (#) Tournament seedings in parentheses. All times are in Eastern Time.

== Rankings ==
Ranking movements Legend: RV = Received votes
| | Week | | | | | | | | | | | | | | | | | | | |
| Poll | Pre | 1 | 2 | 3 | 4 | 5 | 6 | 7 | 8 | 9 | 10 | 11 | 12 | 13 | 14 | 15 | 16 | 17 | 18 | Final |
|---|---|---|---|---|---|---|---|---|---|---|---|---|---|---|---|---|---|---|---|---|
| AP | RV | RV | RV | RV | | | | RV | | | | | | | | | | | RV | Not released |
| Coaches | RV | RV | RV | RV | | | | RV | | | | | | | | | | | | |
