= 2016–17 Villanova Wildcats men's basketball team =

American college basketball team

2016–17 Villanova Wildcats men's basketball

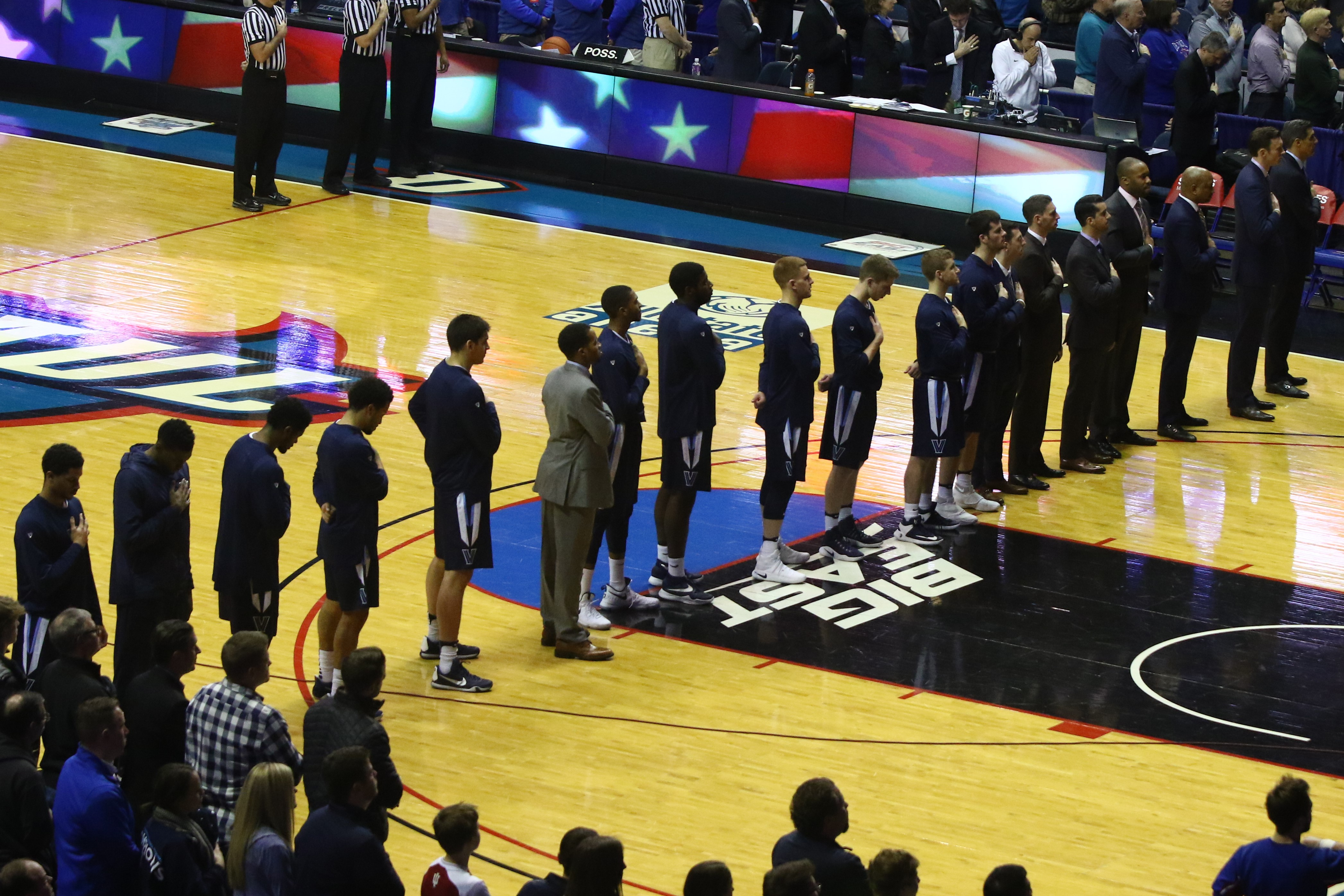

Big East regular season and tournament champions Philadelphia Big 5 champions Charleston Classic champions

NCAA tournament, Second Round
- Conference: Big East Conference

Ranking
- Coaches: No. 8
- AP: No. 1
- Record: 32–4 (15–3 Big East)
- Head coach: Jay Wright (16th season)
- Assistant coaches: Baker Dunleavy; Ashley Howard; Kyle Neptune
- Home arena: The Pavilion; Wells Fargo Center

2016–17 Big East men's basketball standings
	Conf.				Overall
Team	W		L	PCT	W		L	PCT
No. 1 Villanova †	15	–	3	.833	32	–	4	.889
No. 21 Butler	12	–	6	.667	25	–	9	.735
Creighton	10	–	8	.556	25	–	10	.714
Seton Hall	10	–	8	.556	21	–	12	.636
Providence	10	–	8	.556	20	–	13	.606
Marquette	10	–	8	.556	19	–	13	.594
Xavier	9	–	9	.500	24	–	14	.632
St. John's	7	–	11	.389	14	–	19	.424
Georgetown	5	–	13	.278	14	–	18	.438
DePaul	2	–	16	.111	9	–	23	.281
† 2017 Big East tournament winner Rankings from AP poll

The 2016–17 Villanova Wildcats men's basketball team represented Villanova University in the 2016–17 NCAA Division I men's basketball season. Led by head coach Jay Wright in his 16th year, the Wildcats participated in the Big East Conference and played their home games at The Pavilion, with some select home games at the Wells Fargo Center in Philadelphia, Pennsylvania. They finished the season 32–4, 15–3 in Big East play to win the regular season championship. In the Big East tournament, they defeated St. John's, Seton Hall, and Creighton to win the tournament championship. As a result, they received the conference's automatic bid to the NCAA tournament. The Wildcats were given the Tournament's overall No. 1 seed as a No. 1 seed in the East region. In the First Round they defeated Mount St. Mary's before being upset by No. 8-seeded Wisconsin in the Second Round. The loss marked the second time in the previous three tournaments that Villanova was upset by an eighth-seeded team.

The season marked the final season for The Pavilion before its temporary closure for a $60 million renovation project. It reopened for the 2018–19 season with the new name of Finneran Pavilion after a Villanova alum who donated $22.6 million to Villanova. All home games for the 2017–18 season were played at the Wells Fargo Center.

== Previous season ==
The Wildcats finished the 2015–16 season with a record of 35–5, 16–2 in Big East play to win the Big East regular season championship. In the Big East tournament they defeated Georgetown and Providence, but lost to Seton Hall in the championship game. The Wildcats received an at-large bid to the NCAA tournament, being awarded the No. 2 seed in the South Region. Villanova defeated UNC Asheville and Iowa to advance to the Sweet Sixteen. In the Sweet Sixteen, they defeated Miami and upset overall No. 1 seed Kansas in the Elite Eight to advance to the fifth Final Four in school history. In the Final Four, the Wildcats defeated Oklahoma to advance to the school's third National Championship game. In the National Championship game, they defeated No. 1 seed North Carolina to earn the second NCAA Championship title in school history, the first since 1985.

== Offseason ==
=== Departures ===
Name	Number	Pos.	Height	Weight	Year	Hometown	Notes
Ryan Arcidiacono	15	PG	6'3"	195	Senior	Langhorne, Pennsylvania	Graduated
Patrick Farrell	20	SF	6'5"	200	Senior	Rockville Centre, New York	Graduated
Henry Lowe	0	PG	5'11"	185	Senior	New York, New York	Graduated
Daniel Ochefu	23	PF	6'11"	245	Senior	Lagos, Nigeria	Graduated
Kevin Rafferty	52	SF	6'8"	215	Senior	Malvern, Pennsylvania	Graduated

=== 2016 signing class ===
College recruiting information
Name	Hometown	School	Height	Weight	Commit date
Omari Spellman; No. 3 PF	North Royalton, OH	MacDuffie School	6 ft 9 in (2.06 m)	272 lb (123 kg)	Feb 20, 2015
Omari Spellman; No. 3 PF	Recruit ratings: Scout: Rivals: 247Sports: ESPN:				
Dylan Painter; No. 29 C	Hershey, PA	Hershey	6 ft 9 in (2.06 m)	215 lb (98 kg)	Sep 16, 2015
Dylan Painter; No. 29 C	Recruit ratings: Scout: Rivals: 247Sports: ESPN:				
Overall recruit ranking:
Note: In many cases, Scout, Rivals, 247Sports, On3, and ESPN may conflict in their listings of height and weight.; In these cases, the average was taken. ESPN grades are on a 100-point scale.; Sources: "2016 Team Ranking". Rivals.

=== Future recruits ===
==== 2017–18 team recruits ====
College recruiting information
Name	Hometown	School	Height	Weight	Commit date
Dhamir Cosby-Roundtree; PF	Philadelphia, PA	Neumann-Goretti High School	6 ft 9 in (2.06 m)	215 lb (98 kg)	Apr 5, 2016
Dhamir Cosby-Roundtree; PF	Recruit ratings: Scout: Rivals: 247Sports: ESPN:				
Jermaine Samuels; SF	Franklin, MA	The Rivers School	6 ft 6 in (1.98 m)	190 lb (86 kg)	Aug 27, 2016
Jermaine Samuels; SF	Recruit ratings: Scout: Rivals: 247Sports: ESPN:				
Collin Gillespie; PG	Warminster, PA	Archbishop Wood Catholic High School	6 ft 2 in (1.88 m)	180 lb (82 kg)	Jan 14, 2017
Collin Gillespie; PG	Recruit ratings: Scout: Rivals: 247Sports: ESPN:				
Overall recruit ranking:
Note: In many cases, Scout, Rivals, 247Sports, On3, and ESPN may conflict in their listings of height and weight.; In these cases, the average was taken. ESPN grades are on a 100-point scale.; Sources: "2017 Team Ranking". Rivals.

== Preseason ==
Prior to the season, Villanova was picked to win the Big East in a poll of Big East coaches. Josh Hart was named preseason Big East Player of the Year. Kris Jenkins was named to the All-Big East first team and Jalen Brunson received an Honorable Mention.

== Roster ==
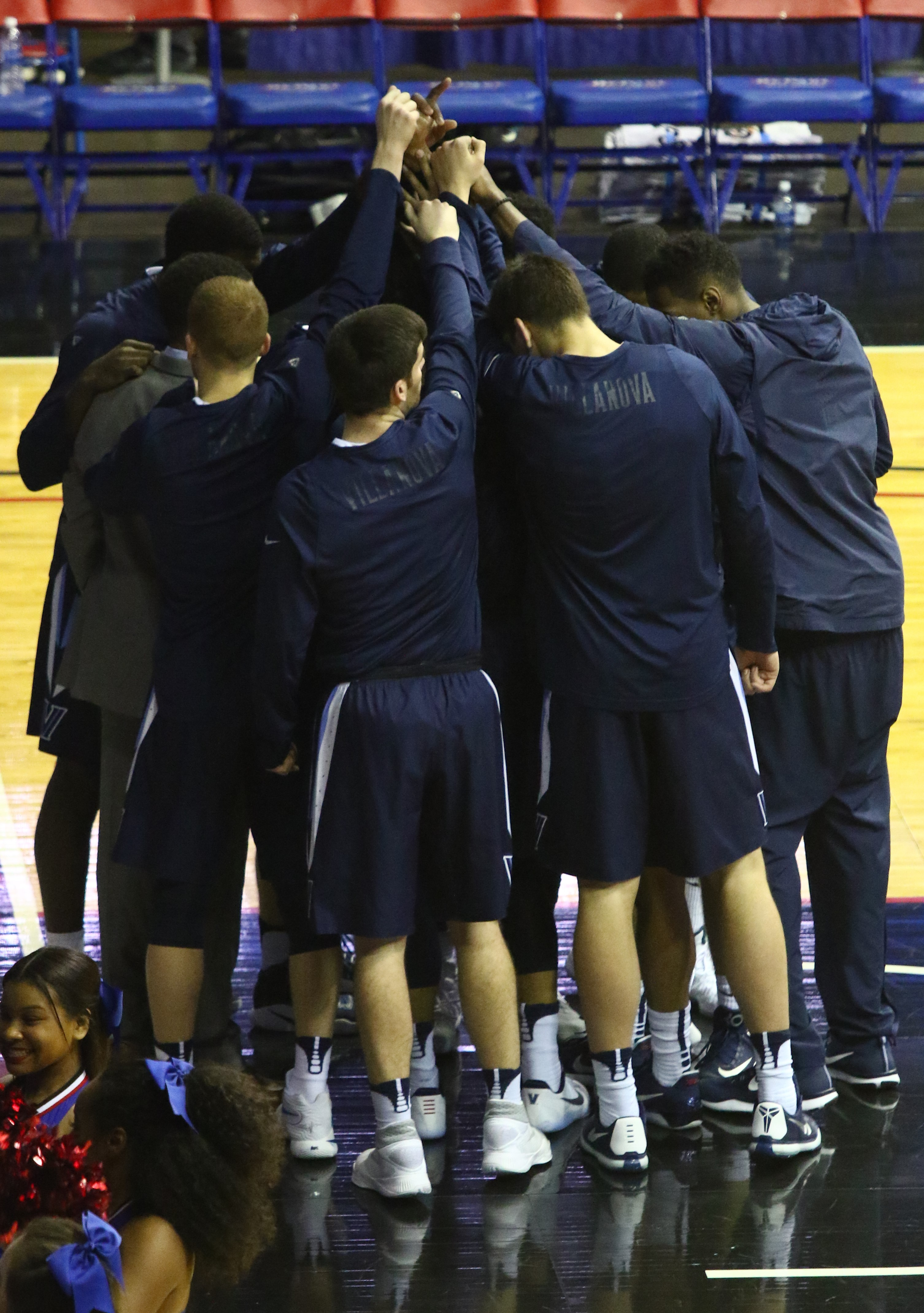
Pregame team huddle

2016–17 Villanova Wildcats men's basketball team
Players
Coaches

Pos.	#	Name	Height	Weight	Year	Previous school	Hometown
G	1	Jalen Brunson	6 ft 2.5 in (1.89 m)	190 lb (86 kg)	So	Stevenson High School	Lincolnshire, Illinois
F	2	Kris Jenkins	6 ft 6 in (1.98 m)	235 lb (107 kg)	Sr	Gonzaga College High School	Upper Marlboro, Maryland
G	3	Josh Hart	6 ft 5.5 in (1.97 m)	215 lb (98 kg)	Sr	Sidwell Friends School	Silver Spring, Maryland
F	4	Eric Paschall	6 ft 7 in (2.01 m)	250 lb (113 kg)	RS So	Fordham	Dobbs Ferry, New York
G	5	Phil Booth	6 ft 3 in (1.91 m)	195 lb (88 kg)	Jr	Mount Saint Joseph High School	Baltimore, Maryland
G	10	Donte DiVincenzo	6 ft 5 in (1.96 m)	205 lb (93 kg)	RS Fr	Salesianum School	Wilmington, Delaware
F	14	Omari Spellman (I) (redshirt)	6 ft 9 in (2.06 m)	260 lb (118 kg)	Fr	St. Thomas More School (CT)	North Royalton, Ohio
F	24	Tom Leibig	6 ft 4 in (1.93 m)	195 lb (88 kg)	Jr	Haverford High School	Havertown, Pennsylvania
G/F	25	Mikal Bridges	6 ft 7 in (2.01 m)	210 lb (95 kg)	RS So	Great Valley High School	Malvern, Pennsylvania
F	34	Tim Delaney	6 ft 8.5 in (2.04 m)	235 lb (107 kg)	RS Fr	Blair Academy	Mullica Hill, New Jersey
G	35	Matt Kennedy	6 ft 2 in (1.88 m)	175 lb (79 kg)	Jr	Flint Hill School	Fairfax, Virginia
G	40	Denny Grace	5 ft 11 in (1.8 m)	175 lb (79 kg)	Sr	Calvert Hall College High School	Catonsville, Maryland
F	42	Dylan Painter	6 ft 10 in (2.08 m)	240 lb (109 kg)	Fr	Hershey High School	Hershey, Pennsylvania
F	45	Darryl Reynolds	6 ft 9 in (2.06 m)	240 lb (109 kg)	Sr	Worcester Academy	Philadelphia, Pennsylvania

Head coach

- Jay Wright (Bucknell)

Assistant coach(es)

- Baker Dunleavy (Villanova)
- Ashley Howard (Drexel)
- Kyle Neptune (Lehigh)

Legend

- (C) Team captain
- (S) Suspended
- (I) Ineligible
- (W) Walk-on
- Injured
- Current redshirt

Roster

== Schedule and results ==
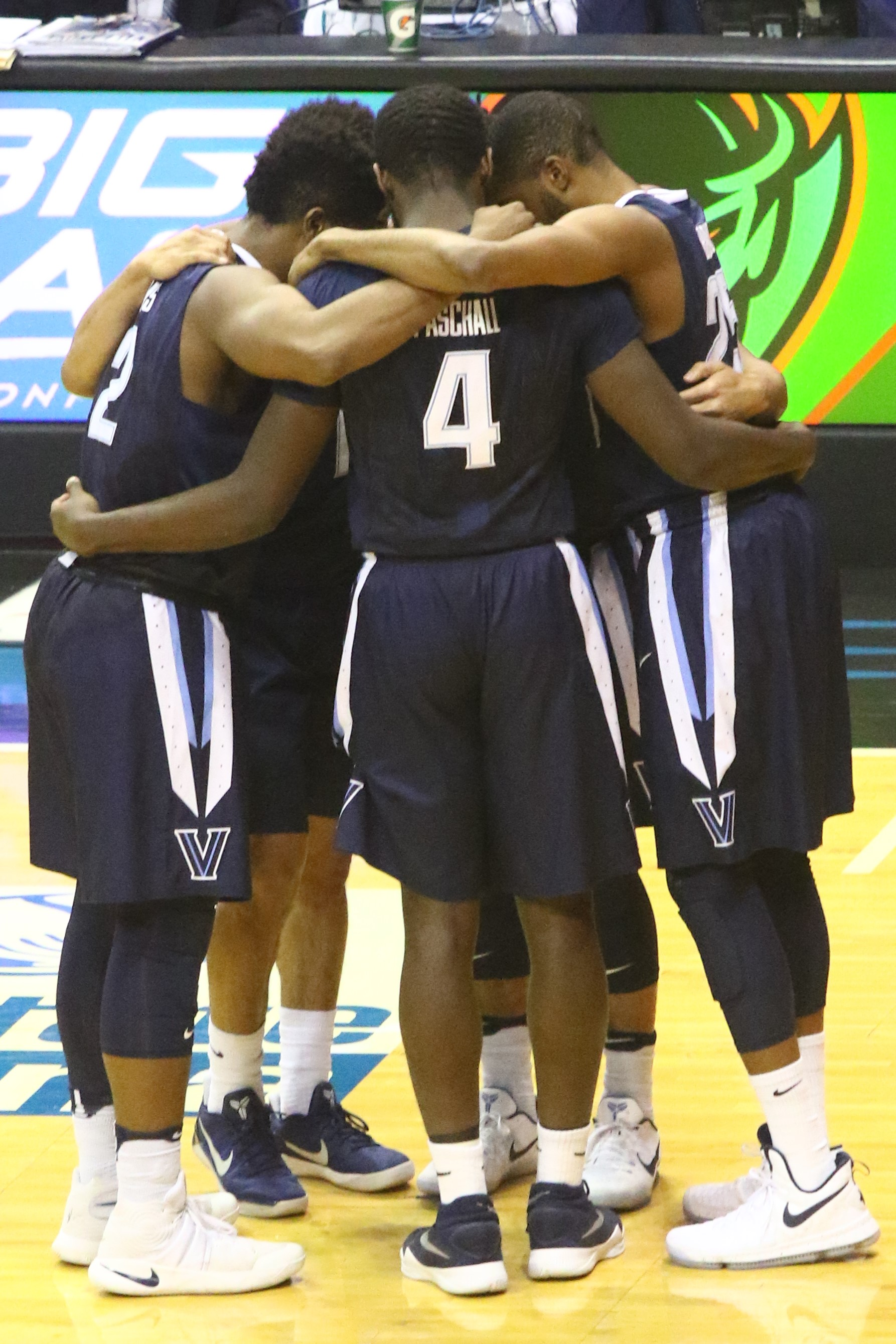
Late season starting 5 huddle

Date time, TV	Rank^{#}	Opponent^{#}	Result	Record	High points	High rebounds	High assists	Site (attendance) city, state
Exhibition
November 5, 2016*; 12:00 pm	No. 4	IUP	W 94–49	0–0	27 – Hart	8 – Reynolds	5 – Tied	Wells Fargo Center (5,617); Philadelphia, PA
Non-conference regular season
November 11, 2016*; 6:30 pm, FS2	No. 4	Lafayette	W 84–44	1–0	17 – Brunson	8 – Tied	4 – Bridges	The Pavilion (6,500); Villanova, PA
November 14, 2016*; 7:00 pm, BTN	No. 3	at No. 15 Purdue; Gavitt Tipoff Games	W 79–76	2–0	24 – Hart	8 – Reynolds	4 – Brunson	Mackey Arena (14,846); West Lafayette, IN
November 17, 2016*; 11:30 am, ESPN2	No. 3	vs. Western Michigan; Charleston Classic quarterfinals	W 76–65	3–0	17 – Paschall	8 – Hart	4 – Hart	TD Arena (4,125); Charleston, SC
November 18, 2016*; 1:30 pm, ESPN2	No. 3	vs. Wake Forest; Charleston Classic semifinals	W 96–77	4–0	30 – Hart	7 – Bridges	6 – Brunson	TD Arena (4,020); Charleston, SC
November 20, 2016*; 9:00 pm, ESPN2	No. 3	vs. UCF; Charleston Classic championship game	W 67–57	5–0	15 – Hart	6 – Reynolds	4 – Bridges	TD Arena (4,325); Charleston, SC
November 23, 2016*; 7:00 pm, FS1	No. 2	College of Charleston	W 63–47	6–0	13 – Hart	11 – Hart	3 – Tied	The Pavilion (6,500); Villanova, PA
November 29, 2016*; 7:00 pm, CSN	No. 2	at Penn; Philadelphia Big 5	W 82–57	7–0	22 – Jenkins	8 – Reynolds	9 – Hart	The Palestra (7,787); Philadelphia, PA
December 3, 2016*; 1:00 pm, CBSSN	No. 2	Saint Joseph's; Philadelphia Big 5	W 88–57	8–0	20 – Jenkins	11 – Hart	10 – Hart	The Pavilion (6,500); Villanova, PA
December 6, 2016*; 7:00 pm, ESPN2	No. 1	vs. La Salle; Philadelphia Big 5	W 89–79	9–0	26 – Brunson	8 – Hart	3 – Brunson	The Palestra (7,120); Philadelphia, PA
December 10, 2016*; 12:00 pm, CBS	No. 1	vs. No. 23 Notre Dame; Never Forget Tribute Classic	W 74–66	10–0	37 – Hart	11 – Hart	4 – Hart	Prudential Center (18,722); Newark, NJ
December 13, 2016*; 7:00 pm, FS1	No. 1	Temple; Philadelphia Big 5	W 78–57	11–0	26 – Hart	6 – Jenkins	6 – Brunson	The Pavilion (6,500); Villanova, PA
December 21, 2016*; 6:30 pm, FS1	No. 1	American	W 90–48	12–0	20 – Hart	7 – Tied	6 – Brunson	The Pavilion (6,500); Villanova, PA
December 28, 2016; 6:30 pm, FS1	No. 1	DePaul	W 68–65	13–0 (1–0)	25 – Hart	7 – Bridges	6 – Brunson	The Pavilion (6,500); Villanova, PA
December 31, 2016; 1:00 pm, FS1	No. 1	at No. 10 Creighton	W 80–70	14–0 (2–0)	27 – Brunson	10 – Hart	5 – Brunson	CenturyLink Center (18,831); Omaha, NE
January 4, 2017; 6:30 pm, FS1	No. 1	at No. 18 Butler	L 58–66	14–1 (2–1)	23 – Brunson	8 – Hart	3 – Hart	Hinkle Fieldhouse (9,206); Indianapolis, IN
January 7, 2017; 7:30 pm, FS1	No. 1	Marquette	W 93–81	15–1 (3–1)	23 – Jenkins	5 – Tied	7 – Hart	Wells Fargo Center (16,891); Philadelphia, PA
January 10, 2017; 7:00 pm, FS1	No. 3	No. 15 Xavier	W 79–54	16–1 (4–1)	20 – Tied	6 – Tied	6 – Brunson	The Pavilion (6,500); Villanova, PA
January 14, 2017; 12:00 pm, FS1	No. 3	at St. John's	W 70–57	17–1 (5–1)	19 – DiVincenzo	8 – Reynolds	4 – Brunson	Madison Square Garden (17,309); New York, NY
January 16, 2017; 6:30 pm, FS1	No. 1	Seton Hall; MLK Day Marathon	W 76–46	18–1 (6–1)	16 – Jenkins	9 – Reynolds	6 – Brunson	The Pavilion (6,500); Villanova, PA
Jan 21, 2017; 12:00 pm, FOX	No. 1	Providence	W 78–68	19–1 (7–1)	25 – Hart	10 – Reynolds	6 – Brunson	Wells Fargo Center (18,731); Philadelphia, PA
January 24, 2017; 8:00 pm, FS1	No. 1	at Marquette	L 72–74	19–2 (7–2)	20 – Bridges	8 – Hart	4 – Brunson	BMO Harris Bradley Center (14,210); Milwaukee, WI
January 29, 2017*; 1:00 pm, FOX	No. 1	No. 12 Virginia	W 61–59	20–2	15 – Tied	5 – Tied	4 – Brunson	Wells Fargo Center (20,907); Philadelphia, PA
February 1, 2017; 7:00 pm, FS1	No. 4	at Providence	W 66–57	21–2 (8–2)	21 – Brunson	9 – Reynolds	5 – Brunson	Dunkin' Donuts Center (11,999); Providence, RI
February 4, 2017; 8:00 pm, CBSSN	No. 4	St. John's	W 92–79	22–2 (9–2)	26 – Hart	9 – Hart	5 – Hart	Wells Fargo Center (18,562); Philadelphia, PA
February 7, 2017; 7:00 pm, FS1	No. 2	Georgetown	W 75–64	23–2 (10–2)	25 – Hart	7 – Tied	4 – Brunson	The Pavilion (6,500); Villanova, PA
February 11, 2017; 2:30 pm, FOX	No. 2	at No. 24 Xavier	W 73–57	24–2 (11–2)	17 – Tied	7 – Hart	7 – Brunson	Cintas Center (10,558); Cincinnati, OH
February 13, 2017; 9:00 pm, CBSSN	No. 2	at DePaul	W 75–62	25–2 (12–2)	18 – Brunson	8 – Jenkins	4 – Brunson	Allstate Arena (6,963); Rosemont, IL
February 18, 2017; 12:30 pm, FOX	No. 2	at Seton Hall	W 92–70	26–2 (13–2)	22 – Tied	4 – Tied	10 – Brunson	Prudential Center (16,733); Newark, NJ
February 22, 2017; 9:00 pm, FS1	No. 2	No. 22 Butler	L 66–74	26–3 (13–3)	24 – Brunson	6 – Tied	2 – Tied	The Pavilion (6,500); Villanova, PA
February 25, 2017; 3:00 pm, FOX	No. 2	No. 23 Creighton	W 79–63	27–3 (14–3)	19 – Paschall	8 – Bridges	3 – Tied	The Pavilion (6,500); Villanova, PA
March 4, 2017; 12:08 pm, FOX	No. 2	at Georgetown	W 81–55	28–3 (15–3)	21 – Hart	7 – Tied	3 – Hart	Verizon Center (15,143); Washington, D.C.
Big East tournament
March 9, 2017; 12:00 pm, FS1	(1) No. 2	vs. (8) St. John's; Quarterfinals	W 108–67	29–3	25 – DiVincenzo	6 – Tied	6 – Jenkins	Madison Square Garden (17,324); New York, NY
March 10, 2017; 6:30 pm, FS1	(1) No. 2	vs. (5) Seton Hall; Semifinals	W 55–53	30–3	19 – Hart	10 – Hart	2 – Brunson	Madison Square Garden (19,812); New York, NY
March 11, 2017; 5:30 pm, FOX	(1) No. 2	vs. (6) Creighton; Championship	W 74–60	31–3	29 – Hart	8 – DiVincenzo	5 – Brunson	Madison Square Garden (19,812); New York, NY
NCAA tournament
Mar. 16*; 7:10 pm, CBS	(1 E) No. 1	vs. (16 E) Mount St. Mary's; First Round	W 76–56	32–3	21 – DiVincenzo	13 – DiVincenzo	3 – Brunson	KeyBank Center (17,619); Buffalo, NY
Mar. 18*; 2:40 pm, CBS	(1 E) No. 1	vs. (8 E) No. 25 Wisconsin; Second Round	L 62–65	32–4	19 – Hart	7 – Bridges	2 – DiVincenzo	KeyBank Center (19,261); Buffalo, NY
*Non-conference game. ^{#}Rankings from AP Poll. (#) Tournament seedings in parentheses. E=East. All times are in Eastern Time.

== Rankings ==
Ranking movements Legend: ██ Increase in ranking ██ Decrease in ranking ( ) = First-place votes
	Week																			
Poll	Pre	1	2	3	4	5	6	7	8	9	10	11	12	13	14	15	16	17	18	Final
AP	4 (4)	3 (5)	2 (21)	2 (20)	1 (57)	1 (56)	1 (56)	1 (56)	1 (59)	3 (1)	1 (28)	1 (35)	4 (4)	2 (6)	2 (5)	2 (5)	2 (2)	1 (59)	1 (59)	Not released
Coaches	3 (1)	3 (2)	2 (4)	2 (5)	1 (28)	1 (28)	1 (28)	1 (27)	1 (30)	3 (1)	2 (4)	2 (11)	4 (1)	2 (4)	2 (3)	3 (5)	3 (5)	1 (27)	1 (27)	8

*AP does not release post-NCAA tournament rankings

== Honors ==
2016–17 All Big East Conference team honorees

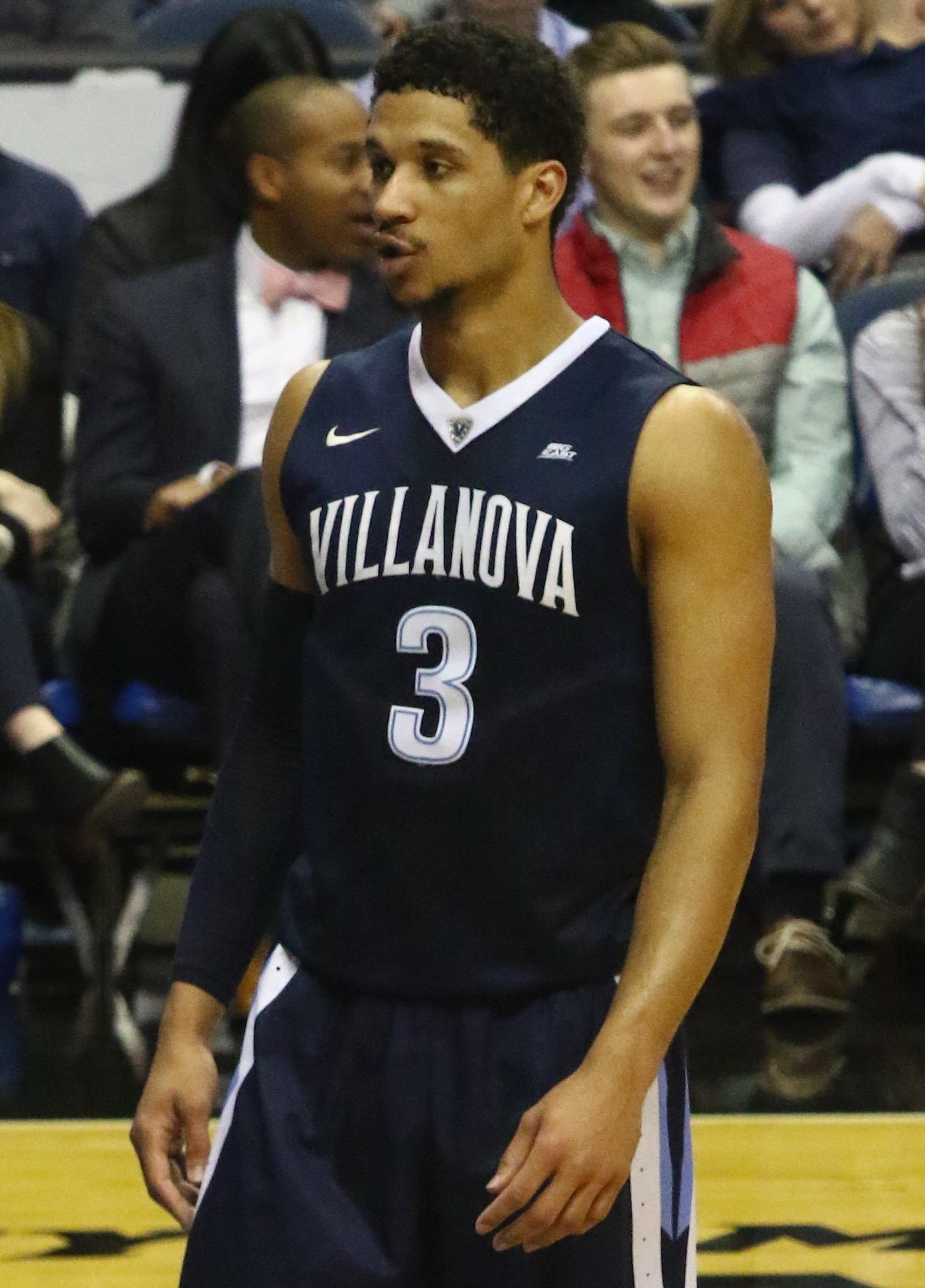
Josh Hart, unanimous 1st team, POY, Co-DPOY (& 2017 All-American)

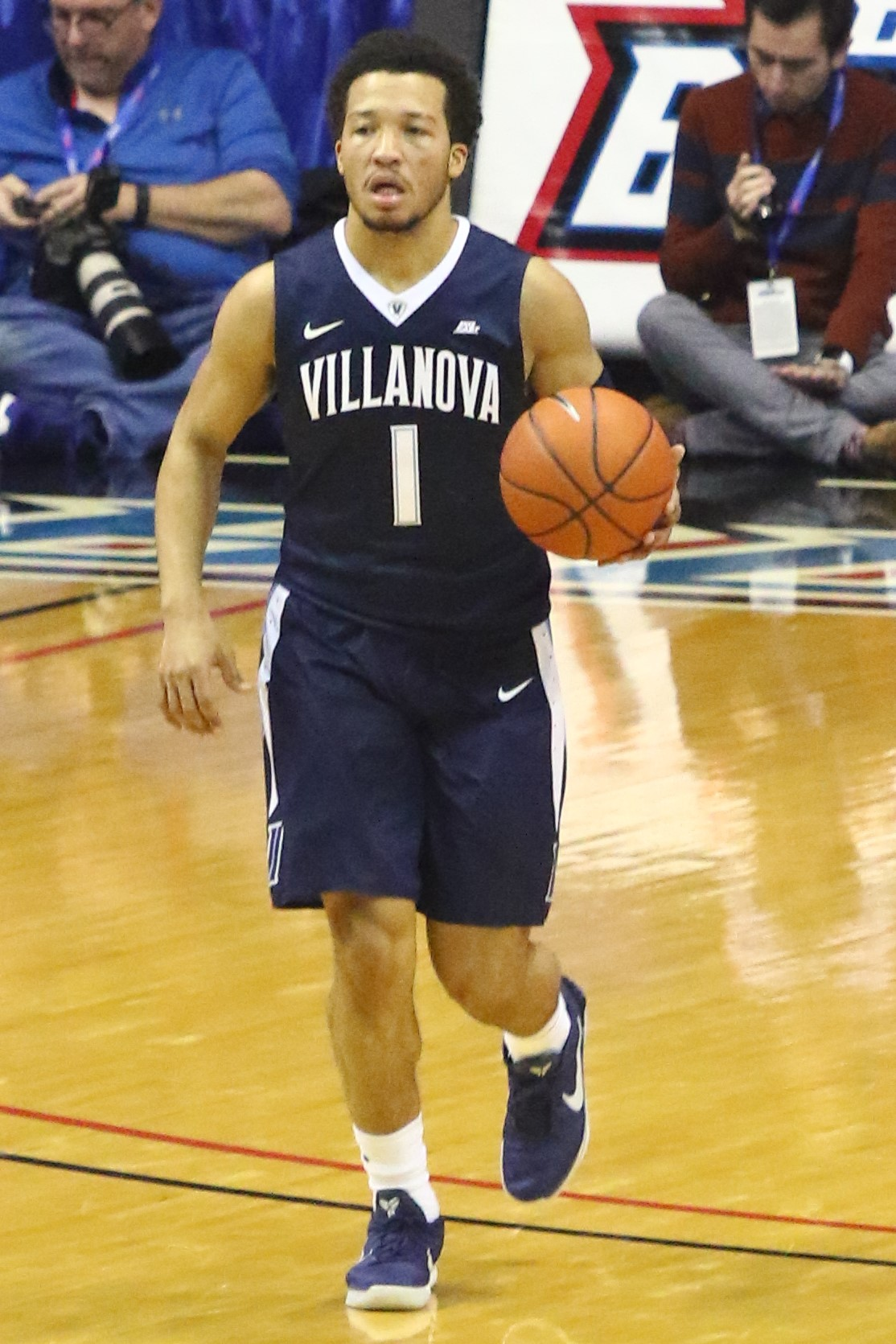
Jalen Brunson, unanimous 1st team

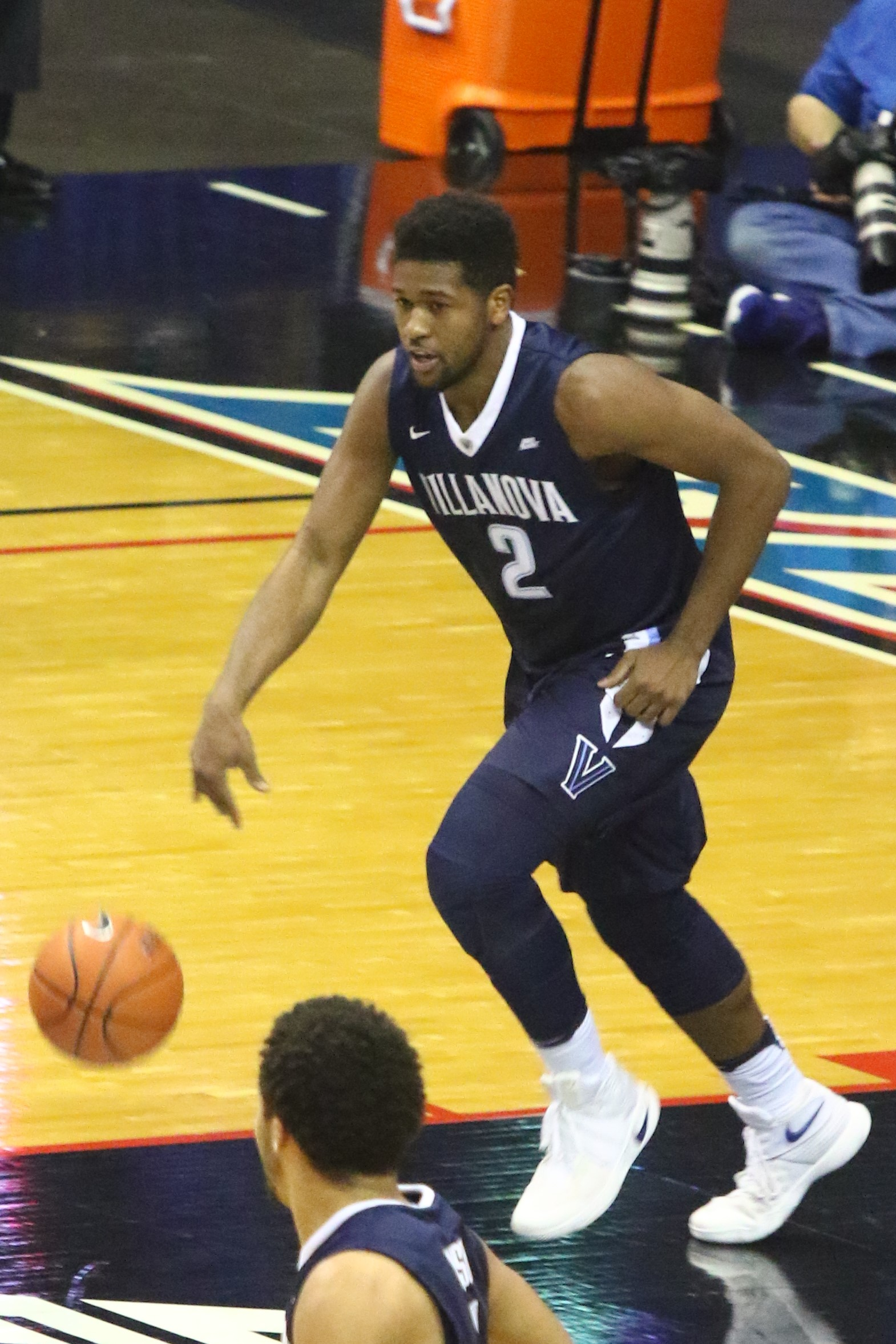
Kris Jenkins, hon. mention

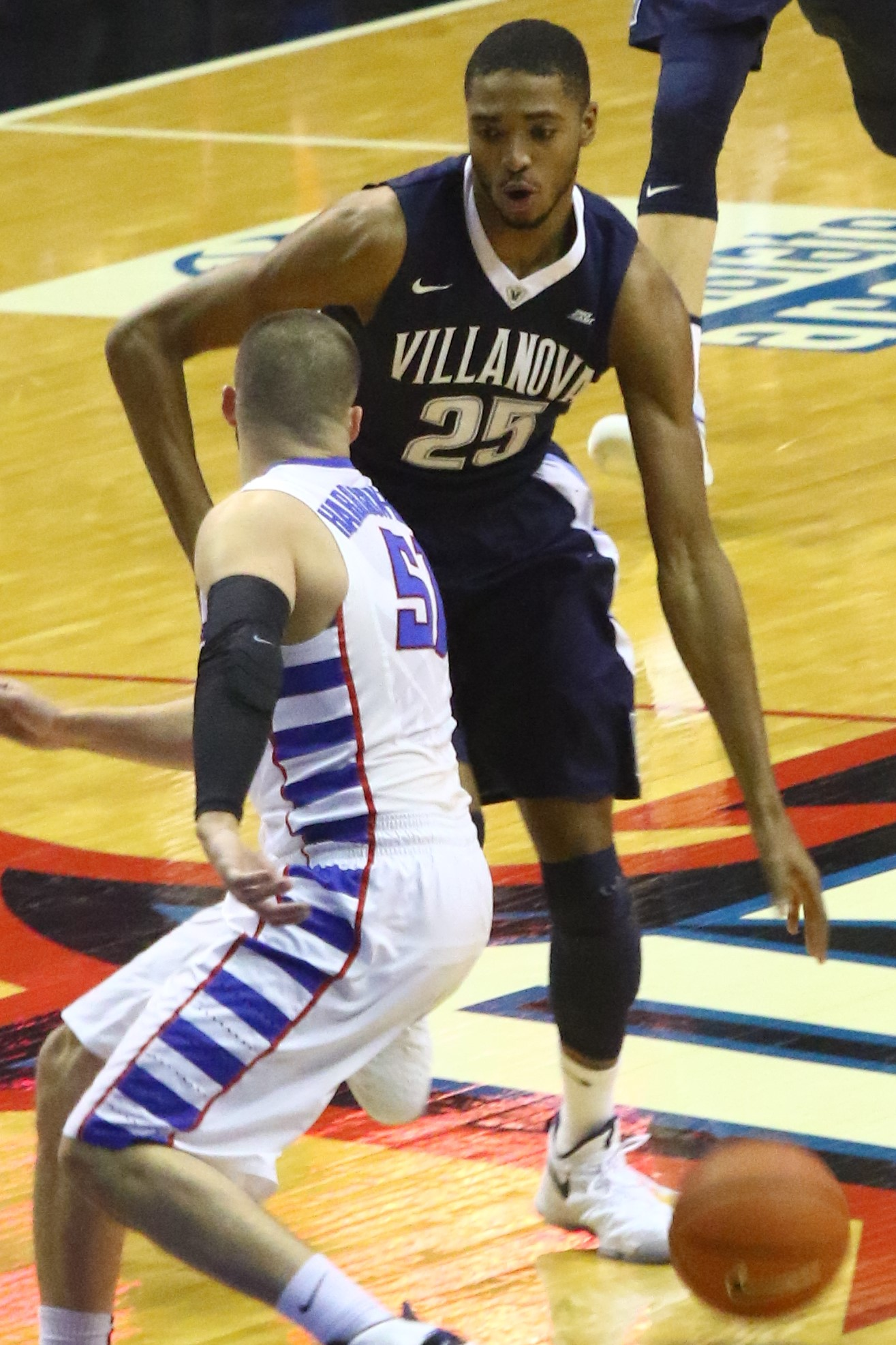
Mikal Bridges, co-DPOY

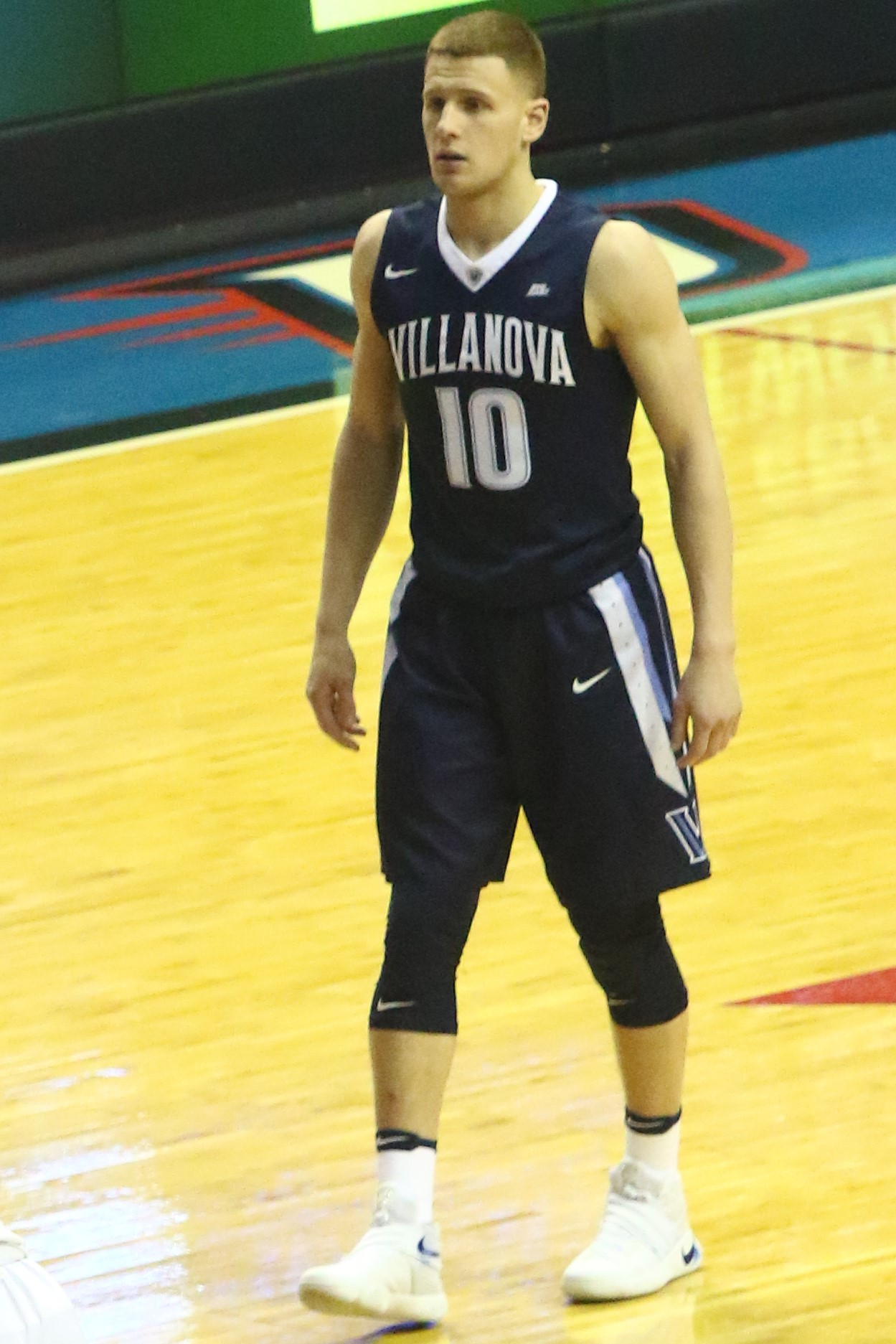
Donte DiVincenzo, All-Freshman
