= 2016–17 Big East Conference men's basketball season =

- League: NCAA Division I
- Sport: Basketball
- Teams: 10
- TV partner(s): CBS, CBSSN, FOX, FS1, FSN

Regular Season
- 2017 Big East Champions: Villanova
- Runners-up: Butler
- Season MVP: Josh Hart

Tournament
- Champions: Villanova
- Runners-up: Creighton

Basketball seasons
- ← 2015–16 2017–18 →

2016–17 Big East men's basketball standings
	Conf.				Overall
Team	W		L	PCT	W		L	PCT
No. 1 Villanova †	15	–	3	.833	32	–	4	.889
No. 21 Butler	12	–	6	.667	25	–	9	.735
Creighton	10	–	8	.556	25	–	10	.714
Seton Hall	10	–	8	.556	21	–	12	.636
Providence	10	–	8	.556	20	–	13	.606
Marquette	10	–	8	.556	19	–	13	.594
Xavier	9	–	9	.500	24	–	14	.632
St. John's	7	–	11	.389	14	–	19	.424
Georgetown	5	–	13	.278	14	–	18	.438
DePaul	2	–	16	.111	9	–	23	.281
† 2017 Big East tournament winner Rankings from AP poll

The 2016–17 Big East Conference men's basketball season began with practices in October 2016, followed by the start of the 2016–17 NCAA Division I men's basketball season in November. This season marked the 38th year in the conference's history, but the fourth as a non-football conference, which officially formed on July 1, 2013. Conference play began on December 31, 2016.

Villanova clinched the regular season championship, their fourth straight Big East regular season championship, with a win over No. 23-ranked Creighton on February 25. Butler finished second, three games behind Villanova.

Villanova shooting guard Josh Hart was named the conference's Player of the Year. Butler head coach Chris Holtmann was named Big East Coach of the Year.

The Big East Conference tournament at Madison Square Garden in New York from March 8 through March 11, 2017. Villanova also won the Big East Conference tournament beating Creighton in the Tournament championship game. As a result, Villanova received the conference's automatic bid to the NCAA tournament.

Seven Big East Schools (Villanova, Butler, Creighton, Marquette, Providence, Seton Hall, and Xavier) received bids to the NCAA Tournament. The conference finished with a 5–7 record in the Tournament, highlighted by Butler reaching the Sweet Sixteen and Xavier advancing to the Elite Eight.

== Head coaches ==
=== Coaches ===
Team	Head coach	Previous job	Years at school	Overall record	Big East record	Big East titles	NCAA Tournaments	NCAA Final Fours	NCAA Championships
Butler	Chris Holtmann	Butler (asst.)	3	70–31	34–20	0	3	0	0
Creighton	Greg McDermott	Iowa State	7	165–81	37––35	0	2	0	0
DePaul	Dave Leitao	Tulsa (asst.)	5	76–79	35–49	0	0	0	0
Georgetown	John Thompson III	Princeton	13	278–151	131–94	3	8	1	0
Marquette	Steve Wojciechowski	Duke (asst.)	3	52–45	22–32	0	1	0	0
Providence	Ed Cooley	Fairfield	6	123–80	54–54	0	4	0	0
Seton Hall	Kevin Willard	Iona	7	128–102	52–74	0	2	0	0
St. John's	Chris Mullin	None	2	22–43	8–28	0	0	0	0
Villanova	Jay Wright	Hofstra	16	386–161	177–99	5	12	2	1
Xavier	Chris Mack	Xavier (asst.)	8	187–91	42–30	0	7	0	0

Notes:

- Year at school includes 2016–17 season.
- Overall and Big East records are from time at current school and are through the end the 2016–17 season.
- Mack's A-10 and McDermott's MVC conference records not included since teams began play in Big East.

== Preseason ==
=== Preseason poll ===
Prior to the season, the Big East conducted a poll of Big East coaches, coaches do not place their own team on their ballots.

Rank	Team
1.	Villanova (9)
2.	Xavier (1)
3.	Creighton
T-4.	Georgetown
T-4.	Seton Hall
6.	Butler
7.	Marquette
8.	St. John's
9.	Providence
10.	DePaul
(first place votes)

=== Preseason All-Big East teams ===
Honor	Recipient
Preseason Player of the Year	Josh Hart, Villanova
Preseason All-Big East First Team	Kelan Martin, Butler
Preseason All-Big East First Team	Maurice Watson, Creighton
Preseason All-Big East First Team	Kris Jenkins, Villanova
Preseason All-Big East First Team	Trevon Bluiett, Xavier
Preseason All-Big East First Team	Edmond Sumner, Xavier
Preseason All-Big East Second Team	Billy Garrett, DePaul
Preseason All-Big East Second Team	Isaac Copeland, Georgetown
Preseason All-Big East Second Team	Luke Fischer, Marquette
Preseason All-Big East Second Team	Khadeen Carrington, Seton Hall
Preseason All-Big East Second Team	Ángel Delgado, Seton Hall
Preseason All-Big East Honorable Mention
Preseason All-Big East Honorable Mention	Marcus Foster, Creighton
Preseason All-Big East Honorable Mention	L. J. Peak, Georgetown
Preseason All-Big East Honorable Mention	Jalen Brunson, Villanova
Preseason Rookie of the Year	Shamorie Ponds, St. John's

== Regular season ==
=== Rankings ===
Legend
Increase in ranking
Decrease in ranking
Not ranked previous week
() First place votes

		Pre	Wk 2	Wk 3	Wk 4	Wk 5	Wk 6	Wk 7	Wk 8	Wk 9	Wk 10	Wk 11	Wk 12	Wk 13	Wk 14	Wk 15	Wk 16	Wk 17	Wk 18	Wk 19	Final
Butler	AP	RV	RV	RV	18	16	18	13	13	18	12	13	11	16	22	24	22	13	18	21	N/A
Butler	Coaches	RV	RV	RV	18	15	18	13	13	18	13	14	11	15	21	25	22	11	20	24	19
Creighton	AP	22	22	12	10	10	10	9	10	10	8	7	16	22	23	20	23	RV	RV	RV	N/A
Creighton	C	23	20	18	12	10	10	9	9	10	8	7	16	22	23	22	23	RV	RV	RV	NR
DePaul	AP																				
DePaul	C																				
Georgetown	AP																				
Georgetown	C																				
Marquette	AP		RV																		
Marquette	C																				
Providence	AP																				
Providence	C																				
Seton Hall	AP	RV	RV	RV				RV	RV	RV									RV	RV	
Seton Hall	C	RV	RV	RV				RV	RV	RV											
St. John's	AP																				
St. John's	C																				
Villanova	AP	4 (4)	3 (5)	2 (21)	2 (20)	1 (57)	1 (56)	1 (56)	1 (56)	1 (59)	3 (1)	1 (28)	1 (35)	4 (4)	2 (6)	2 (5)	2 (5)	2 (2)	2 (2)	1 (59)	N/A
Villanova	C	3 (1)	3 (2)	2 (4)	2 (5)	1 (28)	1 (28)	1 (28)	1 (27)	1 (30)	3 (1)	2 (4)	2 (11)	4 (1)	2 (4)	2 (3)	2 (5)	2 (2)	2 (2)	1 (27)	8
Xavier	AP	7	11	9	7	13	13	17	17	16	15	22	24	RV	24	RV	NR	NR	NR	NR	N/A
Xavier	C	8	10	8	7	14	17	17	17	15	14	19	22	RV	25	RV	RV	RV	NR	RV	18

=== Conference matrix ===
This table summarizes the head-to-head results between teams in conference play through February 14, 2017.

	Butler	Creighton	DePaul	Georgetown	Marquette	Providence	Seton Hall	St. John's	Villanova	Xavier
vs. Butler	–	2–0	0–2	1–1	0–2	1–1	1–1	1–1	0–2	0-2
vs. Creighton	0–2	–	0–2	0–2	2–0	1–1	1–1	0–2	2–0	1–1
vs. DePaul	2–0	2–0	–	1–1	2–0	1–1	2–0	2–0	2–0	2-0
vs. Georgetown	1–1	1–1	1–1	–	1–1	2–0	2–0	1–1	2–0	2–0
vs. Marquette	2–0	0–2	0–2	1–1	–	2–0	1–1	1–1	1–1	0-2
vs. Providence	1–1	1–1	1–1	0–2	0–2	–	1–1	1–1	2–0	1-1
vs. Seton Hall	1–1	1–1	0–2	0–2	1–1	1–1	–	1–1	2–0	1-1
vs. St. John's	1–1	2–0	0–2	1–1	1–1	1–1	1–1	–	2–0	2–0
vs. Villanova	2–0	0–2	0–2	0–2	1–1	0–2	0–2	0–2	–	0–2
vs. Xavier	2–0	1–1	0–2	0–2	2–0	1–1	1–1	0–2	2–0	–
Total	12–6	10–8	2–14	5–13	10–8	10–8	10–8	7–11	15–3	9-9

=== Player of the week ===
Week	Player of the week	Freshman of the week
November 14, 2016	Rodney Pryor, Georgetown	Sam Hauser, Marquette
November 21, 2016	Josh Hart, Villanova	Myles Powell, Seton Hall
November 28, 2016	Marcus Foster, Creighton	Justin Patton, Creighton
December 5, 2016	Rodney Bullock, Providence	Justin Patton, Creighton
December 12, 2016	Josh Hart, Villanova	Shamorie Ponds, St. John's
December 19, 2016	Kelan Martin, Butler	Kamar Baldwin, Butler
December 26, 2016	Marcus Foster, Creighton	Shamorie Ponds, St. John's
January 2, 2017	Jalen Brunson, Villanova	Shamorie Ponds, St. John's
January 9, 2017	Desi Rodriguez, Seton Hall	Justin Patton, Creighton
January 16, 2017	L. J. Peak, Georgetown	Markus Howard, Marquette
January 23, 2017	Josh Hart, Villanova	Kamar Baldwin, Butler
January 30, 2017	Trevon Bluiett, Xavier	Shamorie Ponds, St. John's
February 6, 2017	Trevon Bluiett, Xavier	Marcus Lovett, St. John's
February 13, 2017	Josh Hart, Villanova	Marcus Lovett, St. John's
February 20, 2017	Khadeen Carrington,Seton Hall	Markus Howard, Marquette
February 27, 2017	Kelan Martin, Butler	Shamorie Ponds, St. John's
March 5, 2017	Angel Delgado, Seton Hall	Markus Howard, Marquette

== Honors and awards ==
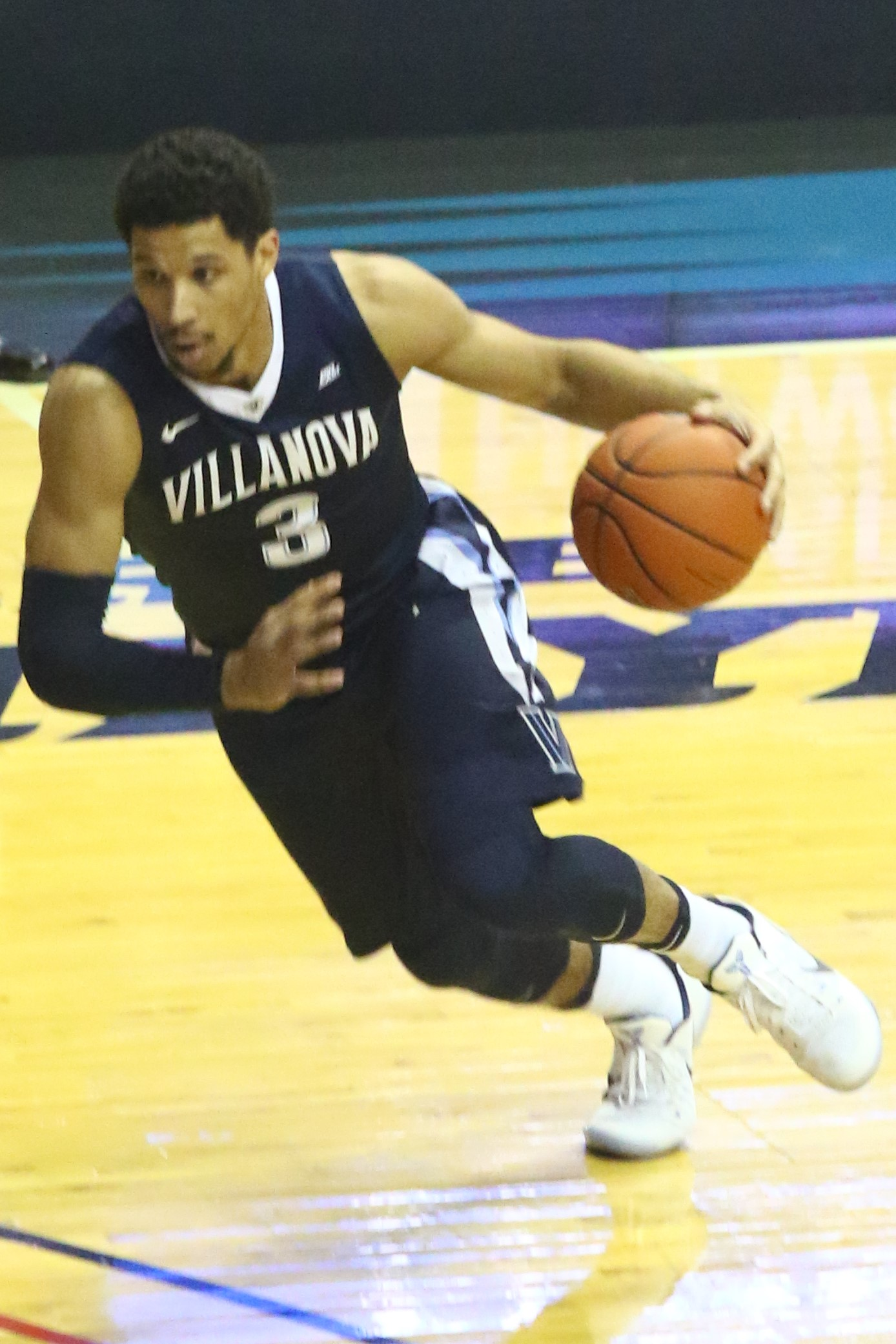
Josh Hart, Big East Player of the Year

=== All-Big East Awards and Teams ===
2017 Big East Men's Basketball Individual Awards
Award	Recipient(s)
Player of the Year	Josh Hart, G./F., Villanova
Coach of the Year	Chris Holtmann, Butler
Defensive Player of the Year	Khyri Thomas, G., Creighton; Mikal Bridges, F., Villanova; Josh Hart, G./F., Villanova
Freshman of the Year	Justin Patton, C., Creighton
Most Improved Player of the Year	Kyron Cartwright, G., Providence
Scholar-Athlete of the Year	Billy Garrett Jr., G., DePaul
Sixth Man Award	Andrew Rowsey, G., Marquette
Sportsmanship Award	Billy Garrett Jr., G., DePaul

2017 Big East Men's Basketball All-Conference Teams
First Team	Second Team	Honorable Mention	All-Freshman Team
Andrew Chrabascz, Butler; Marcus Foster*, Creighton; Ángel Delgado*, Seton Hall; Jalen Brunson*, Villanova; Josh Hart*, Villanova; Trevon Bluiett, Xavier	Kelan Martin, Butler; Justin Patton, Creighton; Rodney Bullock, Providence; Kyron Cartwright, Providence; Khadeen Carrington, Seton Hall	Rodney Pryor, Georgetown; Kris Jenkins, Villanova	Kamar Baldwin*, Butler; Justin Patton*, Creighton; Markus Howard, Marquette; Marcus LoVett Jr.*, St. John’s; Shamorie Ponds*, St. John's; Donte DiVincenzo, Villanova
* unanimous selection Sources

== Postseason ==
=== 2017 Big East tournament ===
Game	Time*	Matchup	Score	Television	Attendance
First round – Wednesday, March 8
1	7:00 pm	No. 9 Georgetown vs. No. 8 St. John's	73–74	FS1	14,830
2	9:30 pm	No. 10 DePaul vs. No. 7 Xavier	64–75	FS1	14,830
Quarterfinals – Thursday, March 9
3	12:00 pm	No. 8 St. John's vs. No. 1 Villanova	67–108	FS1	17,324
4	2:30 pm	No. 5 Seton Hall vs. No. 4 Marquette	82–76	FS1	17,324
5	7:00 pm	No. 7 Xavier vs. No. 2 Butler	62–57	FS1	16,003
6	9:30 pm	No. 6 Creighton vs. No. 3 Providence	70–58	FS1	16,003
Semifinals – Friday, March 10
7	6:30 pm	No. 5 Seton Hall vs. No. 1 Villanova	53–55	FS1	19,812
8	9:30 pm	No. 7 Xavier vs. No. 6 Creighton	72–75	FS1	19,812
Championship – Saturday, March 11
9	5:30 pm	No. 1 Villanova vs. No. 6 Creighton	74–60	FOX	19,812
*Game times in Eastern Time. Tournament seed in parentheses. Rankings denote Associated Press Poll ranking.

=== NCAA tournament ===
The winner of the Big East tournament received an automatic bid to the 2017 NCAA Division I men's basketball tournament.

Seed	Region	School	First Four	Round of 64	Round of 32	Sweet 16	Elite Eight	Final Four	Championship
1	East	Villanova		(16) Mount St. Mary's - W, 76–56	(8) Wisconsin - L, 62–65				
4	South	Butler		(13) Winthrop - W, 76–64	(12) Middle Tennessee - W, 74–65	(1) North Carolina - L, 80–92			
6	Midwest	Creighton		(11) Rhode Island - L, 84–72					
9	South	Seton Hall		(8) Arkansas - L, 71–77					
10	East	Marquette		(7) South Carolina - L, 73–93					
11	West	Xavier		(6) Maryland - W, 76–65	(3) Florida State - W, 91–66	(2) Arizona - W, 73–71	(1) Gonzaga - L, 59–83		
11	East	Providence	(11) USC - L, 71–75						
		W–L (%):	0–1 (.000)	3–3 (.500)	2–1 (.667)	1–1 (.500)	0–1 (.000)	0–0 (–)	0–0 (–) Total: 6–7 (.462)
