= 2016–17 Marquette Golden Eagles men's basketball team =

American college basketball season

2016–17 Marquette Golden Eagles men's basketball
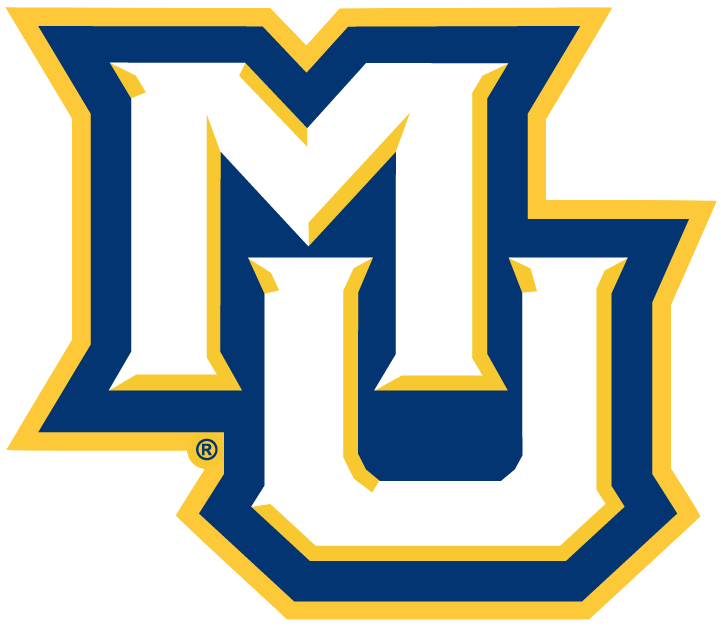

NCAA tournament, First Round
- Conference: Big East Conference|Big East
- Record: 19–13 (10–8 Big East)
- Head coach: Steve Wojciechowski (3rd season)
- Assistant coaches: Chris Carrawell; Stan Johnson; Brett Nelson
- Home arena: BMO Harris Bradley Center

2016–17 Big East men's basketball standings
	Conf.				Overall
Team	W		L	PCT	W		L	PCT
No. 1 Villanova †	15	–	3	.833	32	–	4	.889
No. 21 Butler	12	–	6	.667	25	–	9	.735
Creighton	10	–	8	.556	25	–	10	.714
Seton Hall	10	–	8	.556	21	–	12	.636
Providence	10	–	8	.556	20	–	13	.606
Marquette	10	–	8	.556	19	–	13	.594
Xavier	9	–	9	.500	24	–	14	.632
St. John's	7	–	11	.389	14	–	19	.424
Georgetown	5	–	13	.278	14	–	18	.438
DePaul	2	–	16	.111	9	–	23	.281
† 2017 Big East tournament winner Rankings from AP poll

The 2016–17 Marquette Golden Eagles men's basketball team represented Marquette University in the 2016–17 NCAA Division I men's basketball season. The Golden Eagles, led by third-year head coach Steve Wojciechowski, played their home games at the BMO Harris Bradley Center, and were members of the Big East Conference. They finished the season 19–12, 10–8 in Big East play to finish in a four-way tie for third place. As the No. 4 seed in the Big East tournament, they lost to Seton Hall in the quarterfinals. They received an at-large bid to the NCAA tournament as a No. 10 seed in the East region where they lost to South Carolina in the First Round.

== Previous season ==
The Golden Eagles finished the 2015–16 season 20–13, 8–10 in Big East play to finish in seventh place. They defeated St. John's in the first round of the Big East tournament to advance to the quarterfinals where they lost to Xavier. Despite having 20 wins, they did not participate in a postseason tournament.

== Offseason ==
=== Departures ===
Name	Number	Pos.	Height	Weight	Year	Hometown	Notes
Henry Ellenson	13	F	6'10"	245	Freshman	Rice Lake, WI	Declared for 2016 NBA draft
Wally Ellenson	22	G	6'6"	210	RS Junior	Rice Lake, WI	Declared for 2016 NBA Development League draft
Christian Haffner	41	G	6'1"	155	Freshman	Gresham, WI	Walk-on; transferred
Michael Mache	42	F	6'5"	220	Senior	Glen Ellyn, IL	Walk-on; graduated
Sandy Cohen III	5	F	6'6"	180	Junior	Seymour, WI	Transferred (Mid-Season)
Traci Carter	21	G	6'0"	175	Sophomore	Philapdelphia, PA	Transferred (Mid-Season)

=== Incoming transfers ===
Name	Number	Pos.	Height	Weight	Year	Hometown	Notes
Katin Reinhardt	22	G	6'6"	220	RS Senior	Dana Point, CA	Transferred from USC. Will be eligible to play immediately since Reinhardt graduated from USC.

=== 2016 recruiting class ===
College recruiting information
Name	Hometown	School	Height	Weight	Commit date
Markus Howard #22 SG	Chandler, AZ	Findlay College Prep	6 ft 0 in (1.83 m)	178 lb (81 kg)	Apr 3, 2016
Markus Howard #22 SG	Recruit ratings: Scout: Rivals: (82)				
Sam Hauser #16 SF	Stevens Point, WI	Stevens Point Area Senior High School	6 ft 6 in (1.98 m)	180 lb (82 kg)	May 17, 2015
Sam Hauser #16 SF	Recruit ratings: Scout: Rivals: (82)				
Brendan Bailey #25 SF	American Fork, WI	American Fork High School	6 ft 8 in (2.03 m)	195 lb (88 kg)	Oct 20, 2015
Brendan Bailey #25 SF	Recruit ratings: Scout: Rivals: (80)				
Overall recruit ranking:
Note: In many cases, Scout, Rivals, 247Sports, On3, and ESPN may conflict in their listings of height and weight.; In these cases, the average was taken. ESPN grades are on a 100-point scale.; Sources: "2016 Team Ranking". Rivals.

=== 2017 recruiting class ===
College recruiting information (2017)
Name	Hometown	School	Height	Weight	Commit date
Ikechukwu Eke; PF	Detroit, MI	Univ. of Detroit Jesuit High School	6 ft 9 in (2.06 m)	220 lb (100 kg)	Jun 19, 2016
Ikechukwu Eke; PF	Recruit ratings: Scout: Rivals: (NR)				
Theo John; PF	Champlin, MN	Champlin High School	6 ft 8 in (2.03 m)	210 lb (95 kg)	Sep 13, 2016
Theo John; PF	Recruit ratings: Scout: Rivals: (79)				
Jamal Cain; SF	Detroit, MI	Cornerstone Academy	6 ft 7 in (2.01 m)	175 lb (79 kg)	Jun 19, 2016
Jamal Cain; SF	Recruit ratings: Scout: Rivals: (81)				
Overall recruit ranking:
Note: In many cases, Scout, Rivals, 247Sports, On3, and ESPN may conflict in their listings of height and weight.; In these cases, the average was taken. ESPN grades are on a 100-point scale.; Sources: "2017 Team Ranking". Rivals.

== Preseason ==
Prior to the season, Marquette was picked to finish seventh in a poll of Big East coaches. Luke Fischer was named to the preseason All-Big East second team.

== Roster ==
2016–17 Marquette Golden Eagles men's basketball team
Players
Coaches

Pos.	#	Name	Height	Weight	Year	Previous school	Hometown
G	0	Markus Howard	5 ft 11 in (1.8 m)	175 lb (79 kg)	Fr	Findlay Prep	Chandler, Arizona
G	1	Duane Wilson	6 ft 2 in (1.88 m)	185 lb (84 kg)	RS Jr	Dominican High School (WI)	Milwaukee, Wisconsin
G/F	2	Sacar Anim (redshirt)	6 ft 5 in (1.96 m)	205 lb (93 kg)	So	DeLaSalle High School (MN)	Minneapolis, Minnesota
G/F	10	Sam Hauser	6 ft 7 in (2.01 m)	225 lb (102 kg)	Fr	Stevens Point Area Senior High School	Stevens Point, Wisconsin
C	12	Matt Heldt	6 ft 10 in (2.08 m)	245 lb (111 kg)	So	Neenah High School	Neenah, Wisconsin
G	22	Katin Reinhardt	6 ft 6 in (1.98 m)	210 lb (95 kg)	GS	USC	Dana Point, California
G	23	Jajuan Johnson	6 ft 5 in (1.96 m)	205 lb (93 kg)	Sr	Southwind High School	Memphis, Tennessee
G	25	Haanif Cheatham	6 ft 5 in (1.96 m)	195 lb (88 kg)	So	Pembroke Pines Charter High School	Fort Lauderdale, Florida
G	30	Andrew Rowsey	5 ft 10 in (1.78 m)	180 lb (82 kg)	RS Jr	UNC Asheville	Lexington, Virginia
C	40	Luke Fischer	6 ft 11 in (2.11 m)	250 lb (113 kg)	RS Sr	Indiana	Germantown, Wisconsin
F	41	Deon Franklin (W)	6 ft 5 in (1.96 m)	215 lb (98 kg)	RS So	Texas Tech	Treviso, Italy
G	52	Cam Marotta (W)	5 ft 10 in (1.78 m)	165 lb (75 kg)	So	Homestead High School (WI)	Mequon, Wisconsin

Head coach

- Steve Wojciechowski (Duke)

Assistant coach(es)

- Chris Carrawell (Duke)
- Brett Nelson (Florida)
- Stan Johnson (Southern Utah)

Legend

- (C) Team captain
- (S) Suspended
- (I) Ineligible
- (W) Walk-on
- Injured
- Current redshirt

Roster

== Schedule and results ==
Date time, TV	Rank^{#}	Opponent^{#}	Result	Record	Site (attendance) city, state
Exhibition
Nov 7, 2016*; 1:00 pm, TWCSC		Rockhurst	W 106–53		BMO Harris Bradley Center (7,975); Milwaukee, WI
Non-conference regular season
Nov 11, 2016*; 5:30 pm, CBSSN		vs. Vanderbilt; Veterans Classic	W 95–71	1–0	Alumni Hall (4,116); Annapolis, MD
Nov 14, 2016*; 7:30 pm, FS1		Howard; 2K Sports Classic	W 81–49	2–0	BMO Harris Bradley Center (11,305); Milwaukee, WI
Nov 17, 2016*; 8:30 pm, ESPN2		vs. Michigan; 2K Sports Classic semifinals	L 61–79	2–1	Madison Square Garden (8,126); New York City, NY
Nov 18, 2016*; 3:30 pm, ESPN2		vs. Pittsburgh; 2K Sports Classic	L 75–78	2–2	Madison Square Garden (8,088); New York City, NY
Nov 22, 2016*; 6:30 pm, FS1		IUPUI; 2K Sports Classic	W 104–79	3–2	BMO Harris Bradley Center (11,552); Milwaukee, WI
Nov 26, 2016*; 6:30 pm, FS2		Houston Baptist	W 101–79	4–2	BMO Harris Bradley Center (11,740); Milwaukee, WI
Nov 30, 2016*; 7:30 pm, FS2		Western Carolina	W 90–44	5–2	BMO Harris Bradley Center (11,397); Milwaukee, WI
Dec 4, 2016*; 2:00 pm, ESPNU		at Georgia	W 89–79	6–2	Stegeman Coliseum (7,620); Athens, GA
Dec 6, 2016*; 6:30 pm, CBSSN		Fresno State	W 84–81	7–2	BMO Harris Bradley Center (11,550); Milwaukee, WI
Dec 10, 2016*; 1:00 pm, FS1		No. 17 Wisconsin; Rivalry	L 84–93	7–3	BMO Harris Bradley Center (18,691); Milwaukee, WI
Dec 19, 2016*; 6:00 pm, FS1		Saint Francis (PA)	W 78–65	8–3	BMO Harris Bradley Center (11,868); Milwaukee, WI
Dec 21, 2016*; 7:30 pm, FS1		SIU Edwardsville	W 89–56	9–3	BMO Harris Bradley Center (11,925); Milwaukee, WI
Big East regular season
Dec 28, 2016; 7:45 pm, FS1		Georgetown	W 76–66	10–3 (1–0)	BMO Harris Bradley Center (14,886); Milwaukee, WI
Jan 1, 2017; 3:30 pm, FS1		at Seton Hall	L 66–69	10–4 (1–1)	Prudential Center (7,894); Newark, NJ
Jan 7, 2017; 6:30 pm, FS1		at No. 1 Villanova	L 81–93	10–5 (1–2)	Wells Fargo Center (16,891); Philadelphia, PA
Jan 11, 2017; 6:00 pm, FS1		Seton Hall	W 89–86 ^{OT}	11–5 (2–2)	BMO Harris Bradley Center (12,388); Milwaukee, WI
Jan 14, 2017; 6:30 pm, FSN		DePaul	W 85–58	12–5 (3–2)	BMO Harris Bradley Center (13,832); Milwaukee, WI
Jan 16, 2017; 11:00 am, FS1		at No. 13 Butler; MLK Day Marathon	L 80–88	12–6 (3–3)	Hinkle Fieldhouse (9,100); Indianapolis, IN
Jan 21, 2017; 2:30 pm, FOX		at No. 7 Creighton	W 102–94	13–6 (4–3)	CenturyLink Center (18,145); Omaha, NE
Jan 24, 2017; 7:00 pm, FS1		No. 1 Villanova	W 74–72	14–6 (5–3)	BMO Harris Bradley Center (14,210); Milwaukee, WI
Jan 28, 2017; 1:00 pm, FSN		Providence	L 78–79	14–7 (5–4)	BMO Harris Bradley Center (15,369); Milwaukee, WI
Feb 1, 2017; 6:00 pm, FS2		at St. John's	L 72–86	14–8 (5–5)	Madison Square Garden (14,201); New York City, NY
Feb 4, 2017; 1:30 pm, FS1		at DePaul	W 92–79	15–8 (6–5)	Allstate Arena (8,392); Rosemont, IL
Feb 7, 2017; 8:00 pm, CBSSN		No. 22 Butler	L 65–68	15–9 (6–6)	BMO Harris Bradley Center (12,423); Milwaukee, WI
Feb 11, 2017; 11:07 am, FOX		at Georgetown	L 62–80	15–10 (6–7)	Verizon Center (11,386); Washington, D.C.
Feb 18, 2017; 7:00 pm, CBSSN		Xavier	W 83–61	16–10 (7–7)	BMO Harris Bradley Center (19,033); Milwaukee, WI
Feb 21, 2017; 7:00 pm, FS1		St. John's	W 93–71	17–10 (8–7)	BMO Harris Bradley Center (13,370); Milwaukee, WI
Feb 25, 2017; 3:00 pm, CBSSN		at Providence	L 69–73	17–11 (8–8)	Dunkin' Donuts Center (13,216); Providence, RI
Mar 1, 2017; 8:00 pm, FS1		at Xavier	W 95–84	18–11 (9–8)	Cintas Center (10,071); Cincinnati, OH
Mar 4, 2017; 1:30 pm, FS2		Creighton	W 91–83	19–11 (10–8)	BMO Harris Bradley Center (17,630); Milwaukee, WI
Big East tournament
Mar 8, 2017; 2:30 pm, FS1	(4)	vs. (5) Seton Hall; Quarterfinals	L 76–82	19–12	Madison Square Garden (17,324); New York City, NY
NCAA tournament
Mar 17, 2017*; 9:50 pm, TBS	(10 E)	vs. (7 E) South Carolina; First Round	L 73–93	19–13	Bon Secours Wellness Arena (14,180); Greenville, SC
*Non-conference game. ^{#}Rankings from AP Poll. (#) Tournament seedings in parentheses. All times are in Eastern Time.
