= 2016–17 Providence Friars men's basketball team =

American college basketball season

2016–17 Providence Friars men's basketball
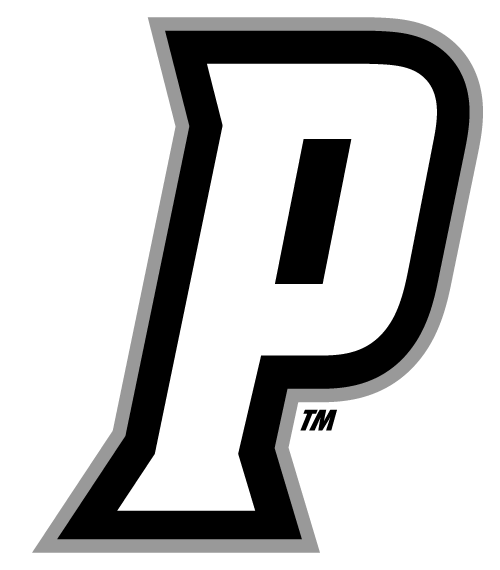

NCAA tournament, First Four
- Conference: Big East Conference
- Record: 20–13 (10–8 Big East)
- Head coach: Ed Cooley (6th season)
- Assistant coaches: Jeff Battle; Brian Blaney
- Home arena: Dunkin' Donuts Center

2016–17 Big East men's basketball standings
	Conf.				Overall
Team	W		L	PCT	W		L	PCT
No. 1 Villanova †	15	–	3	.833	32	–	4	.889
No. 21 Butler	12	–	6	.667	25	–	9	.735
Creighton	10	–	8	.556	25	–	10	.714
Seton Hall	10	–	8	.556	21	–	12	.636
Providence	10	–	8	.556	20	–	13	.606
Marquette	10	–	8	.556	19	–	13	.594
Xavier	9	–	9	.500	24	–	14	.632
St. John's	7	–	11	.389	14	–	19	.424
Georgetown	5	–	13	.278	14	–	18	.438
DePaul	2	–	16	.111	9	–	23	.281
† 2017 Big East tournament winner Rankings from AP poll

The 2016–17 Providence Friars men's basketball team represented Providence College in the 2016–17 NCAA Division I men's basketball season. The Friars, led by sixth-year head coach Ed Cooley, played their home games at the Dunkin' Donuts Center, as members of the Big East Conference. They finished the season 20–13, 10–8 in Big East play to finish in a four-way tie for third place. As the No. 3 seed in the Big East tournament, they lost in the quarterfinals to Creighton. They received an at-large bid to the NCAA tournament as a No. 11 seed where they lost to USC in the First Four.

== Previous season ==
The Friars finished the season 24–11, 10–8 in Big East play to finish in a tie for fourth place. They defeated Butler in the quarterfinals of the Big East tournament to advance to the semifinals where they lost to Villanova. They received an at-large bid to the NCAA tournament as a No. 9 seed where they defeated USC in the first round before losing to North Carolina in the second round.

== Preseason ==
Prior to the season, Providence was picked to finish ninth in a poll of Big East coaches.

== Departures ==
Name	Number	Pos.	Height	Weight	Year	Hometown	Notes
Ben Bentil	0	F	6'9"	245	Sophomore	Wilmington, DE	Declared for the 2016 NBA draft; selected 51st overall by the Boston Celtics
Kris Dunn	3	G	6'4"	220	RS Junior	New London, CT	Declared for the 2016 NBA draft; selected 5th overall by the Minnesota Timberwolves
Quadree Smith	10	F	6'8"	285	Freshman	Temple Hills, MD	Transferred
Tyree Chambers	14	G	6'2"	182	Sophomore	Bayreuth, Germany	Transfrerred to LeMoyne
Junior Lomomba	32	G	6'5"	205	RS Junior	Montreal, QE	Graduate transferred to Western Kentucky

=== Incoming transfers ===
Name	Number	Pos.	Height	Weight	Year	Hometown	Previous School
Emmitt Holt	15	F	6'8"	230	Junior	Webster, NY	Junior college transferred from Indian Hills Community College

== Incoming recruits ==
College recruiting
Name	Hometown	School	Height	Weight	Commit date
Alpha Diallo #19 SF	Denver, CO	Brewster Academy	6 ft 7 in (2.01 m)	195 lb (88 kg)	Apr 26, 2016
Alpha Diallo #19 SF	Recruit ratings: Scout: (82)				
Maliek White #34 PG	Richmond, VA	George Wythe High School	6 ft 1 in (1.85 m)	170 lb (77 kg)	Sep 27, 2015
Maliek White #34 PG	Recruit ratings: Scout: (79)				
Kalif Young; PF	Orangeville, ON	Orangeville Prep	6 ft 9 in (2.06 m)	250 lb (110 kg)	May 18, 2016
Kalif Young; PF	Recruit ratings: Rivals: (NR)				
Overall recruit ranking:
Note: In many cases, Scout, Rivals, 247Sports, On3, and ESPN may conflict in their listings of height and weight.; In these cases, the average was taken. ESPN grades are on a 100-point scale.; Sources: "2016 Team Ranking". Rivals.

=== Class of 2017 recruits ===
College recruiting (2017)
Name	Hometown	School	Height	Weight	Commit date
Makai Ashton-Langford; PG	Worcester, MA	Brewster Academy	6 ft 2 in (1.88 m)	185 lb (84 kg)	Apr 10, 2017
Makai Ashton-Langford; PG	Recruit ratings: Scout: Rivals: (89)				
Dajour Dickens; C	Hampton, VA	Bethel High School	6 ft 10 in (2.08 m)	205 lb (93 kg)	Feb 27, 2016
Dajour Dickens; C	Recruit ratings: Scout: Rivals: (80)				
Nate Watson; C	Arlington, VA	Bishop O'Connell High School	6 ft 8 in (2.03 m)	220 lb (100 kg)	Sep 10, 2016
Nate Watson; C	Recruit ratings: Scout: Rivals: (80)				
Overall recruit ranking:
Note: In many cases, Scout, Rivals, 247Sports, On3, and ESPN may conflict in their listings of height and weight.; In these cases, the average was taken. ESPN grades are on a 100-point scale.; Sources: "2017 Team Ranking". Rivals.

== Roster ==
2016–17 Providence Friars men's basketball team
Players
Coaches

Pos.	#	Name	Height	Weight	Year	Previous school	Hometown
G	2	Bryan Donovan (W)	6 ft 0 in (1.83 m)	180 lb (82 kg)	Fr	Bishop McGuinness	Gainesville, Florida
G	4	Maliek White	6 ft 2 in (1.88 m)	180 lb (82 kg)	Fr	George Wythe High School	Richmond, Virginia
F	5	Rodney Bullock (C)	6 ft 8 in (2.03 m)	225 lb (102 kg)	RS Jr	Kecoughtan High School	Hampton, Virginia
G	11	Alpha Diallo	6 ft 7 in (2.01 m)	205 lb (93 kg)	Fr	Brewster Academy	New York, New York
G	12	Casey Woodring (W)	6 ft 2 in (1.88 m)	190 lb (86 kg)	Sr	Cushing Academy	Darien, Connecticut
F	13	Kalif Young	6 ft 9 in (2.06 m)	250 lb (113 kg)	Fr	Orangeville Prep	Vaughan, Ontario
F	15	Emmitt Holt	6 ft 7 in (2.01 m)	230 lb (104 kg)	Jr	Webster Schroeder; Indian Hills CC	Webster, New York
F	21	Jalen Lindsay	6 ft 7 in (2.01 m)	220 lb (100 kg)	Jr	Huntington Prep	Murfreesboro, Tennessee
G	22	Ricky Council II	6 ft 5 in (1.96 m)	200 lb (91 kg)	So	Moravian Prep	Durham, North Carolina
G	24	Kyron Cartwright (C)	5 ft 11 in (1.8 m)	185 lb (84 kg)	Jr	Compton High School	Compton, California
F	25	Drew Edwards	6 ft 4 in (1.93 m)	190 lb (86 kg)	So	Calvert Hall	Perry Hall, Maryland
F	34	Tom Planek (W)	6 ft 6 in (1.98 m)	210 lb (95 kg)	Jr	Fenwick High School	Oak Park, Illinois
G	35	Ryan Fazekas	6 ft 8 in (2.03 m)	215 lb (98 kg)	So	Marquette Catholic High School	Chesterton, Indiana
G	44	Isaiah Jackson	6 ft 6 in (1.98 m)	225 lb (102 kg)	RS Jr	Villages Charter School; George Mason	Gainesville, Florida

Head coach

- Ed Cooley (Stonehill)

Assistant coach(es)

- Jeff Battle (Marshall)
- Brian Blaney (Roanoke)
- Ivan Thomas (VCU)

Legend

- (C) Team captain
- (S) Suspended
- (I) Ineligible
- (W) Walk-on
- Injured
- Current redshirt

Roster

== Schedule and results ==
Date time, TV	Rank^{#}	Opponent^{#}	Result	Record	Site (attendance) city, state
Exhibition
Oct 29, 2016*; 7:00 pm		Carleton	W 87–69		Dunkin' Donuts Center (4,875); Providence, RI
Non-conference regular season
Nov 14, 2016*; 7:00 pm, FS2		Vermont	W 80–58	1–0	Dunkin' Donuts Center (8,310); Providence, RI
Nov 17, 2016*; 7:00 pm, BTN		at Ohio State; Gavitt Tipoff Games	L 67–72	1–1	Value City Arena (11,089); Columbus, OH
Nov 19, 2016*; 12:00 pm, FS2		Grambling State; Emerald Coast Classic	W 71–54	2–1	Dunkin' Donuts Center (6,093); Providence, RI
Nov 21, 2016*; 6:30 pm, FS1		St. Francis Brooklyn; Emerald Coast Classic	W 64–48	3–1	Dunkin' Donuts Center (4,208); Providence, RI
Nov 25, 2016*; 9:30 pm, CBSSN		vs. Memphis; Emerald Coast Classic semifinals	W 60–51	4–1	The Arena at NWFSC (2,196); Niceville, FL
Nov 26, 2016*; 7:00, CBSSN		vs. No. 7 Virginia; Emerald Coast Classic championship	L 52–63	4–2	The Arena at NWFSC (2,196); Niceville, FL
Nov 30, 2016*; 6:30 pm, FS2		New Hampshire	W 76–62	5–2	Dunkin' Donuts Center (4,801); Providence, RI
Dec 3, 2016*; 4:30 pm, FSN/OSN		No. 21 Rhode Island; Ocean State Cup	W 63–60	6–2	Dunkin' Donuts Center (12,488); Providence, RI
Dec 6, 2016*; 7:00 pm, FS2		Brown; Ocean State Cup	W 95–57	7–2	Dunkin' Donuts Center (4,869); Providence, RI
Dec 10, 2016*; 12:00 pm, FS1		Massachusetts	W 75–69	8–2	Dunkin' Donuts Center (7,815); Providence, RI
Dec 17, 2016*; 12:00 pm, FS1		Wagner	W 76–54	9–2	Dunkin' Donuts Center (4,069); Providence, RI
Dec 20, 2016*; 8:30 pm, FS1		Maine	W 79–59	10–2	Dunkin' Donuts Center (4,257); Providence, RI
Dec 23, 2016*; 4:00 pm, ESPNU		at Boston College	L 67–79	10–3	Conte Forum (5,266); Chestnut Hill, MA
Big East regular season
Dec 28, 2016; 7:00 pm, FSN/OSN		at No. 17 Xavier	L 56–82	10–4 (0–1)	Cintas Center (10,426); Cincinnati, OH
Jan 1, 2017; 3:00 pm, CBSSN		at No. 13 Butler	L 61–78	10–5 (0–2)	Hinkle Fieldhouse (8,403); Indianapolis, IN
Jan 4, 2017; 7:00 pm, CBSSN		Georgetown	W 76–70	11–5 (1–2)	Dunkin' Donuts Center (9,586); Providence, RI
Jan 7, 2017; 2:00 pm, CBSSN		No. 10 Creighton	L 64–78	11–6 (1–3)	Dunkin' Donuts Center (8,176); Providence, RI
Jan 10, 2017; 9:00 pm, FS1		at DePaul	L 63–64	11–7 (1–4)	Allstate Arena (4,641); Rosemont, IL
Jan 14, 2017; 12:00 pm, FSN/OSN		Seton Hall	W 65–61	12–7 (2–4)	Dunkin' Donuts Center (9,253); Providence, RI
Jan 16, 2017; 9:00 pm, FS1		at Georgetown; MLK Day Marathon	W 74–56	13–7 (3–4)	Verizon Center (5,169); Washington, D.C.
Jan 21, 2017; 12:00 pm, FOX		at No. 1 Villanova	L 68–78	13–8 (3–5)	Wells Fargo Center (18,731); Philadelphia, PA
Jan 25, 2017; 6:30 pm, FS1		St. John's	L 86–91	13–9 (3–6)	Dunkin' Donuts Center (10,314); Providence, RI
Jan 28, 2017; 2:00 pm, FSN/OSN		at Marquette	W 79–78	14–9 (4–6)	BMO Harris Bradley Center (15,369); Milwaukee, WI
Feb 1, 2017; 7:00 pm, FS1		No. 4 Villanova	L 57–66	14–10 (4–7)	Dunkin' Donuts Center (12,463); Providence, RI
Feb 8, 2017; 12:00 pm, FS1		at Seton Hall	L 70–72 ^{OT}	14–11 (4–8)	Walsh Gymnasium (7,024); South Orange, NJ
Feb 11, 2017; 4:00 pm, CBSSN		No. 22 Butler	W 71–65	15–11 (5–8)	Dunkin' Donuts Center (12,746); Providence, RI
Feb 15, 2017; 6:30 pm, FS1		Xavier	W 75–63	16–11 (6–8)	Dunkin' Donuts Center (10,102); Providence, RI
Feb 22, 2017; 8:00 pm, FSN/OSN		at No. 23 Creighton	W 68–66	17–11 (7–8)	CenturyLink Center (17,382); Omaha, NE
Feb 25, 2017; 4:00 pm, CBSSN		Marquette	W 73–69	18–11 (8–8)	Dunkin' Donuts Center (13,216); Providence, RI
Feb 28, 2017; 9:00 pm, FS1		DePaul	W 73–64	19–11 (9–8)	Dunkin' Donuts Center (10,101); Providence, RI
Mar 4, 2017; 12:00 pm, FS2		at St. John's	W 86–75	20–11 (10–8)	Madison Square Garden (8,826); New York City, NY
Big East tournament
Mar 9, 2017; 9:30 pm, FS1	(3)	vs. (6) Creighton; Quarterfinals	L 58–70	20–12	Madison Square Garden (16,003); New York City, NY
NCAA tournament
Mar 15, 2017*; 9:10 pm, truTV	(11 E)	vs. (11 E) USC; First Four	L 71–75	20–13	UD Arena (11,528); Dayton, OH
*Non-conference game. ^{#}Rankings from AP Poll. (#) Tournament seedings in parentheses. E=East Region. All times are in Eastern Time.
