= 2017 Big Ten men's basketball tournament =

- Classification: Division I
- Season: 2016–17
- Teams: 14
- Site: Verizon Center; Washington, D.C.
- Champions: Michigan (2nd* title)
- Winning coach: John Beilein (1st title)
- MVP: Derrick Walton Jr. (Michigan)
- Television: BTN, ESPN/2, CBS

2016–17 Big Ten Conference men's basketball standings
	Conf.				Overall
Team	W		L	PCT	W		L	PCT
No. 15 Purdue	14	–	4	.778	27	–	8	.771
No. 25 Wisconsin	12	–	6	.667	27	–	10	.730
Maryland	12	–	6	.667	24	–	9	.727
Minnesota	11	–	7	.611	24	–	10	.706
No. 23 Michigan †	10	–	8	.556	26	–	12	.684
Northwestern	10	–	8	.556	24	–	12	.667
Michigan State	10	–	8	.556	20	–	15	.571
Iowa	10	–	8	.556	19	–	15	.559
Illinois	8	–	10	.444	20	–	15	.571
Ohio State	7	–	11	.389	17	–	15	.531
Indiana	7	–	11	.389	18	–	16	.529
Penn State	6	–	12	.333	15	–	18	.455
Nebraska	6	–	12	.333	12	–	19	.387
Rutgers	3	–	15	.167	15	–	18	.455
† 2017 Big Ten tournament winner Rankings from AP poll

The 2017 Big Ten men's basketball tournament was the postseason men's basketball tournament for the Big Ten Conference held from March 8 through March 12, 2017 at the Verizon Center in Washington, D.C. It was the first Big Ten men's basketball tournament held outside the conference's traditional heartland in the Midwest. The championship was won by Michigan, which defeated Wisconsin in the championship game. As a result, Michigan received the conference's automatic bid to the NCAA Tournament. The win marked the second championship for Michigan (their first championship in 1998 was later vacated) and they became the lowest-seeded team ever to win the Big Ten tournament.

== Seeds ==
All 14 Big Ten schools participated in the tournament. Teams were seeded by conference record, with a tiebreaker system used to seed teams with identical conference records. The top 10 teams received a first round bye and the top four teams received a double bye. Tiebreaking procedures remained unchanged from the 2016 tournament.

Seed	School	Conf.	Tiebreaker
1	Purdue	14–4	
2	Wisconsin	12–6	1–0 vs Maryland
3	Maryland	12–6	0–1 vs Wisconsin
4	Minnesota	11–7	
5	Michigan State	10–8	3–1 vs Northwestern, Iowa, Michigan
6	Northwestern	10–8	2–1 vs Michigan State, Iowa, Michigan
7	Iowa	10–8	1–2 vs Michigan State, Northwestern, Michigan
8	Michigan	10–8	1–3 vs Michigan State, Northwestern, Iowa
9	Illinois	8–10	
10	Indiana	7–11	1–0 vs Ohio State
11	Ohio State	7–11	0–1 vs Indiana
12	Nebraska	6–12	1–0 vs Penn State
13	Penn State	6–12	0–1 vs Nebraska
14	Rutgers	3–15	

== Schedule ==
Session	Game	Time*	Matchup	Score	Television	Attendance
First round – Wednesday, March 8
1	1	4:30 pm	No. 13 Penn State vs. No. 12 Nebraska	76–67^{OT}	ESPN2	
1	2	7:00 pm	No. 14 Rutgers vs. No. 11 Ohio State	66–57	BTN	
Second round – Thursday, March 9
2	3	12:00 pm	No. 9 Illinois vs. No. 8 Michigan	55–75	BTN	12,189
2	4	2:45 pm	No. 13 Penn State vs. No. 5 Michigan State	51–78	BTN	12,189
3	5	6:30 pm	No. 10 Indiana vs. No. 7 Iowa	95–73	ESPN2	12,408
3	6	9:00 pm	No. 14 Rutgers vs. No. 6 Northwestern	61–83	ESPN2	12,408
Quarterfinals – Friday, March 10
4	7	12:00 pm	No. 8 Michigan vs. No. 1 Purdue	74–70^{OT}	ESPN	12,334
4	8	2:30 pm	No. 5 Michigan State vs. No. 4 Minnesota	58–63	ESPN	12,334
5	9	6:30 pm	No. 10 Indiana vs. No. 2 Wisconsin	60–70	BTN	15,624
5	10	9:00 pm	No. 6 Northwestern vs. No. 3 Maryland	72–64	BTN	15,624
Semifinals – Saturday, March 11
6	11	1:00 pm	No. 8 Michigan vs. No. 4 Minnesota	84–77	CBS	13,984
6	12	3:30 pm	No 6 Northwestern vs. No. 2 Wisconsin	48-76	CBS	13,984
Championship – Sunday, March 12
7	13	3:00 pm	No. 8 Michigan vs. No. 2 Wisconsin	71–56	CBS	12,902
*Game times in Eastern Time. (Note: The United States began Daylight saving time at 2:00 am on Sunday, March 12. As a result, times through the semifinal games are in Eastern Standard Time while the Championship game time is in Eastern Daylight Time.) Rankings denote tournament seed

== Game summaries ==
=== First round ===
ESPN2

Mar 8
4:30 pm

Recap

No. 12 Nebraska 67, No. 13 Penn State 76 (OT)
Scoring by half: 33–38, 27–22 Overtime: 7–16
Pts: E. Taylor 15; Rebs: E. Morrow Jr. 10; Asts: G. Watson Jr./T. Webster 3	Pts: M. Watkins 18; Rebs: M. Watkins 11; Asts: T. Carr 6

Verizon Center
Washington, D.C.
Referees: Lamont Simpson, Terry Oglesby, Rob Riley

BTN

Mar 8
7:00 pm

Recap

No. 11 Ohio State 57, No. 14 Rutgers 66
Scoring by half: 32–29, 25–37
Pts: J. Tate 18; Rebs: T. Thompson 11; Asts: C. J. Jackson 6	Pts: N. Johnson 21; Rebs: M. Wiliams 9 Asts: C. Sanders 3

Verizon Center
Washington, D.C.
Referees: Gene Steratore, Paul Szelc, Steve McJunkins

=== Second round ===
BTN

Mar 9
Noon

Recap

No. 8 Michigan 75, No. 9 Illinois 55
Scoring by half: 40–29, 35–26
Pts: D. Walton Jr. 19; Rebs: Z. Irvin 7 Asts: D. Walton Jr. 5	Pts: T. Abrams 23; Rebs: M. Finke 7 Asts: T. Lucas 3

Verizon Center
Washington, D.C.
Attendance: 12,189
Referees: Terry Oglesby, Chris Beaver, Kelly Pfeifer

BTN

Mar 9
2:45 pm

Recap

No. 5 Michigan State 78, No. 13 Penn State 51
Scoring by half: 45–27, 33–24
Pts: M. Bridges/N. Ward 15; Rebs: M. Bridges/N. Ward 9 Asts: L. Nairn Jr. 9	Pts: T. Carr/L. Stevens 16; Rebs: S. Garner 7 Asts: T. Carr 3

Verizon Center
Washington, D.C.
Attendance: 12,189
Referees: Terry Wymer, Larry Scirotto, Paul Szelc

ESPN2

Mar 9
6:30 pm

Recap

No. 7 Iowa 73, No. 10 Indiana 95
Scoring by half: 40–43, 33–52
Pts: J. Bohannon 24; Rebs: C. Pemsl 11; Asts: J. Bohannon 10	Pts: J. Blackmon Jr. 23; Rebs: J. Blackmon Jr./J. Morgan 8 Asts: J. Blackmon Jr./R. Johnson 4

Verizon Center
Washington, D.C.
Attendance: 12,408
Referees: D. J. Carstensen, Bo Boroski, Steve McJunkins

ESPN2

Mar 9
9:00 pm

Recap

No. 6 Northwestern 83, No. 14 Rutgers 61
Scoring by half: 42–24, 41–37
Pts: V. Law/S. Lindsey 16; Rebs: D. Pardon 8 Asts: V. Law/S. Lindsey 4	Pts: N. Johnson 21; Rebs: D. Freeman/C. J. Gettys 5 Asts: C. Sanders 3

Verizon Center
Washington, D.C.
Attendance: 12,408
Referees: Lamont Simpson, Rob Riley, Donnie Eppley

=== Quarterfinals ===
ESPN

Mar 10
Noon

Recap

No. 1 Purdue 70, No. 8 Michigan 74 (OT)
Scoring by half: 37–38, 29–28 Overtime: 4–8
Pts: C. Edwards/I. Haas 17; Rebs: C. Swanigan 13; Asts: C. Swanigan 5	Pts: D. J. Wilson 26; Rebs: D. J. Wilson 8 Asts: D. Walton Jr. 4

Verizon Center
Washington, D.C.
Attendance: 12,189
Referees: D.J. Carstensen, Paul Szelc, Rob Riley

ESPN

Mar 10
2:25 pm

Recap

No. 4 Minnesota 63, No. 5 Michigan State 58
Scoring by half: 28–26, 35–32
Pts: R. Lynch 16; Rebs: J. Murphy 13; Asts: N. Mason 3	Pts: M. Bridges 20; Rebs: N. Ward 11; Asts: K. Goins 3

Verizon Center
Washington, D.C.
Attendance: 12,189
Referees: Terry Wymer, Larry Scirotto, Paul Szelc

BTN

Mar 10
6:30 pm

Recap

No. 2 Wisconsin 70, No. 10 Indiana 60
Scoring by half: 33–27, 37–33
Pts: B. Koenig 16; Rebs: E. Happ 12; Asts: B. Koenig 5	Pts: J. Blackmon Jr. 17; Rebs: J. Blackmon Jr. 8 Asts: J. Newkirk 3

Verizon Center
Washington, D.C.
Attendance: 15,624
Referees: Lamont Simpson, Larry Scirotto, Lewis Garrison

BTN

Mar 10
8:55 pm

Recap

No. 3 Maryland 64, No. 6 Northwestern 72
Scoring by half: 36–34, 28–38
Pts: M. Trimble 20; Rebs: M. Trimble 6 Asts: K. Huerter/M. Trimble 4	Pts: V. Law/S. Lindsey 17; Rebs: D. Pardon 8 Asts: B. McIntosh 6

Verizon Center
Washington, D.C.
Attendance: 15,624
Referees: Terry Wymer, Terry Oglesby, Kelly Pfeifer

=== Semifinals ===
CBS

Mar 11
1:00 pm

Recap

No. 4 Minnesota 77, No. 8 Michigan 84
Scoring by half: 36–47, 41–37
Pts: N. Mason 23; Rebs: J. Murphy 9 Asts: A. Coffey/N. Mason 4	Pts: D. Walton Jr. 29; Rebs: Z. Irvin/D. Walton Jr. 5 Asts: D. Walton Jr. 9

Verizon Center
Washington, D.C.
Attendance: 13,984
Referees: Gene Steratore, Paul Szelc, Rob Riley

CBS

Mar 11
3:30 pm

Recap

No. 2 Wisconsin 76, No. 6 Northwestern 48
Scoring by half: 38–21, 38–27
Pts: N. Hayes 18; Rebs: N. Hayes 10; Asts: D. Trice 3	Pts: S. Lindsey 16; Rebs: D. Pardon 7 Asts: J. Ash/I. Brown/V. Law/B. McIntosh/N. Taphorn 1

Verizon Center
Washington, D.C.
Attendance: 13,984
Referees: Terry Wymer, Terry Oglesby, Larry Scirotto

=== Championship ===
CBS

Mar 12
3:00 pm

Recap

No. 2 Wisconsin 56, No. 8 Michigan 71
Scoring by half: 32–33, 24–38
Pts: B. Koenig 15; Rebs: N. Hayes/E. Happ 11; Asts: E. Happ/D. Trice 3	Pts: D. Walton, Jr. 22; Rebs: Z. Irvin 7 Asts: D. Walton, Jr. 7

Verizon Center
Washington, D.C.
Attendance: 12,902
Referees: D.J. Carstensen, Lamont Simpson, Bo Boroski

== Bracket ==
First round Wednesday, March 8 ESPN2/BTN
12	Nebraska	67
13	Penn State	76*
11	Ohio State	57
14	Rutgers	66

Second round Thursday, March 9 ESPN2/BTN
8	Michigan	75
9	Illinois	55
5	Michigan State	78
13	Penn State	51
7	Iowa	73
10	Indiana	95
6	Northwestern	83
14	Rutgers	61

Quarterfinals; Friday, March 10; ESPN/BTN
1	Purdue	70
8	Michigan	74*
4	Minnesota	63
5	Michigan State	58
2	Wisconsin	70
10	Indiana	60
3	Maryland	64
6	Northwestern	72

Semifinals; Saturday, March 11; CBS
8	Michigan	84
4	Minnesota	77
2	Wisconsin	76
6	Northwestern	48

Championship; Sunday, March 12; CBS
8	Michigan	71
2	Wisconsin	56

* denotes overtime period

== All-Tournament Team ==
- Derrick Walton, Michigan – Big Ten tournament Most Outstanding Player
- Zak Irvin, Michigan
- Ethan Happ, Wisconsin
- Nigel Hayes, Wisconsin
- Bronson Koenig, Wisconsin
