= 2016–17 Ohio State Buckeyes men's basketball team =

American college basketball season

2016–17 Ohio State Buckeyes men's basketball
- Conference: Big Ten Conference
- Record: 17–15 (7–11 Big Ten)
- Head coach: Thad Matta (13th season)
- Assistant coaches: Dave Dickerson; Chris Jent; Greg Paulus
- Home arena: Value City Arena

2016–17 Big Ten Conference men's basketball standings
	Conf.				Overall
Team	W		L	PCT	W		L	PCT
No. 15 Purdue	14	–	4	.778	27	–	8	.771
No. 25 Wisconsin	12	–	6	.667	27	–	10	.730
Maryland	12	–	6	.667	24	–	9	.727
Minnesota	11	–	7	.611	24	–	10	.706
No. 23 Michigan †	10	–	8	.556	26	–	12	.684
Northwestern	10	–	8	.556	24	–	12	.667
Michigan State	10	–	8	.556	20	–	15	.571
Iowa	10	–	8	.556	19	–	15	.559
Illinois	8	–	10	.444	20	–	15	.571
Ohio State	7	–	11	.389	17	–	15	.531
Indiana	7	–	11	.389	18	–	16	.529
Penn State	6	–	12	.333	15	–	18	.455
Nebraska	6	–	12	.333	12	–	19	.387
Rutgers	3	–	15	.167	15	–	18	.455
† 2017 Big Ten tournament winner Rankings from AP poll

The 2016–17 Ohio State Buckeyes men's basketball team represented Ohio State University in the 2016–17 NCAA Division I men's basketball season. Their head coach is Thad Matta, in his 13th season with the Buckeyes. The Buckeyes played their home games at Value City Arena in Columbus, Ohio and were members of the Big Ten Conference. They finished the season 17–15, 7–11 in Big Ten play to finish in a tie for 10th place. As the No. 11 seed in the Big Ten tournament, they lost in the first round to Rutgers.

On June 5, 2017, the school announced that head coach Thad Matta would not return as head coach. On June 9, the school hired Butler head coach Chris Holtmann as head coach.

== Previous season ==
The Buckeyes finished the 2015–16 season with a record of 21–14, 11–7 in Big Ten play to finish in seventh place. They defeated Penn State in the second round of the Big Ten tournament to advance to the quarterfinals where they lost to Michigan State. They received an invitation to the National Invitational tournament where they defeated Akron in the first round to before losing to Florida.

== Departures ==
Name	Number	Pos.	Height	Weight	Year	Hometown	Notes
Mickey Mitchell	00	F	6'7"	232	Freshman	Plano, TX	Transferred to UC Santa Barbara
Austin Grandstaff	3	G	6'4"	188	Freshman	Rockwall, TX	Transferred to DePaul
Daniel Giddens	4	F/C	6'10"	228	Freshman	Marietta, GA	Transferred to Alabama
A. J. Harris	12	G	5'9"	157	Freshman	Dayton, OH	Transferred to New Mexico State
Jake Lorbach	34	F	6'7"	210	Senior	Elyria, OH	Graduated

=== Incoming transfers ===
Name	Number	Pos.	Height	Weight	Year	Hometown	Previous School
C. J. Jackson	3	G	6'1"	175	Sophomore	Charlotte, NC	Junior college transferred from Eastern Florida State College

== Recruiting Class of 2016 ==
College recruiting information
Name	Hometown	School	Height	Weight	Commit date
D. J. Funderburk #14 SF	Lakewood, OH	Hargrave Military Academy	6 ft 9 in (2.06 m)	240 lb (110 kg)	Apr 1, 2015
D. J. Funderburk #14 SF	Recruit ratings: Scout: Rivals: 247Sports: ESPN:				
Micah Potter #15 C	Mentor, OH	Mentor High School	6 ft 10 in (2.08 m)	240 lb (110 kg)	Apr 20, 2015
Micah Potter #15 C	Recruit ratings: Scout: Rivals: 247Sports: ESPN:				
Andre Wesson #30 PF	Westerville, OH	Westerville South High School	6 ft 6 in (1.98 m)	190 lb (86 kg)	Apr 13, 2015
Andre Wesson #30 PF	Recruit ratings: Scout: Rivals: 247Sports: ESPN:				
Overall recruit ranking: Scout: NR Rivals: NR ESPN: NR
Note: In many cases, Scout, Rivals, 247Sports, On3, and ESPN may conflict in their listings of height and weight.; In these cases, the average was taken. ESPN grades are on a 100-point scale.; Sources: "2016 Team Ranking". Rivals.

=== Recruiting Class of 2017 ===
College recruiting information (2017)
Name	Hometown	School	Height	Weight	Commit date
Kaleb Wesson #C	Westerville, OH	Westerville South High School	6 ft 9 in (2.06 m)	300 lb (140 kg)	Jul 3, 2015
Kaleb Wesson #C	Recruit ratings: Scout: Rivals: 247Sports: ESPN:				
Braxton Beverly; PG	Hazard, KY	Hargrave Military Academy	5 ft 11 in (1.80 m)	170 lb (77 kg)	Oct 10, 2016
Braxton Beverly; PG	Recruit ratings: Scout: Rivals: 247Sports: ESPN:				
Overall recruit ranking: Scout: NR Rivals: NR ESPN: NR
Note: In many cases, Scout, Rivals, 247Sports, On3, and ESPN may conflict in their listings of height and weight.; In these cases, the average was taken. ESPN grades are on a 100-point scale.; Sources: "2017 Team Ranking". Rivals.

=== Recruiting Class of 2018 ===
College recruiting information (2018)
Name	Hometown	School	Height	Weight	Commit date
Dane Goodwin; SG	Columbus, OH	Upper Arlington High School	6 ft 4 in (1.93 m)	187 lb (85 kg)	Jul 3, 2015
Dane Goodwin; SG	Recruit ratings: Scout: Rivals: 247Sports: ESPN:				
Darius Bazley; SF	Cincinnati, OH	Finneytown High School	6 ft 7 in (2.01 m)	185 lb (84 kg)	Aug 27, 2016
Darius Bazley; SF	Recruit ratings: Scout: Rivals: 247Sports: ESPN:				
Justin Ahrens; SF	Versailles, OH	Versailles South High School	6 ft 5 in (1.96 m)	181 lb (82 kg)	Aug 27, 2016
Justin Ahrens; SF	Recruit ratings: Scout: Rivals: 247Sports: ESPN:				
Overall recruit ranking: Scout: NR Rivals: NR ESPN: NR
Note: In many cases, Scout, Rivals, 247Sports, On3, and ESPN may conflict in their listings of height and weight.; In these cases, the average was taken. ESPN grades are on a 100-point scale.; Sources: "2018 Team Ranking". Rivals.

== Roster ==
2016–17 Ohio State Buckeyes men's basketball team
Players
Coaches

Pos.	#	Name	Height	Weight	Year	Previous school	Hometown
C	0	Micah Potter	6 ft 9 in (2.06 m)	240 lb (109 kg)	Fr	Montverde Academy	Mentor, Ohio
F	1	Jae'Sean Tate	6 ft 4 in (1.93 m)	230 lb (104 kg)	Jr	Pickerington High School Central	Pickerington, Ohio
F	2	Marc Loving	6 ft 8 in (2.03 m)	220 lb (100 kg)	Sr	St. John's Jesuit High School	Toledo, Ohio
G	3	C. J. Jackson	6 ft 1 in (1.85 m)	175 lb (79 kg)	So	Eastern Florida State College	Charlotte, North Carolina
F	4	D. J. Funderburk	6 ft 9 in (2.06 m)	205 lb (93 kg)	Fr	Hargrave Military Academy	Lakewood, Ohio
C	10	David Bell	6 ft 9 in (2.06 m)	225 lb (102 kg)	RS So	Garfield Heights High School	Cleveland, Ohio
G	13	JaQuan Lyle	6 ft 5 in (1.96 m)	210 lb (95 kg)	So	Huntington Prep	Evansville, Indiana
G	14	Joey Lane (W)	6 ft 1 in (1.85 m)	180 lb (82 kg)	So	Deerfield High School (IL)	Deerfield, Illinois
G	15	Kam Williams	6 ft 2 in (1.88 m)	185 lb (84 kg)	RS Jr	Mount Saint Joseph High School	Baltimore, Maryland
G	23	Jimmy Jent	6 ft 4 in (1.93 m)	195 lb (88 kg)	So	Wofford	Columbus, Ohio
F	24	Andre Wesson	6 ft 6 in (1.98 m)	220 lb (100 kg)	Fr	Westerville South High School	Westerville, Ohio
C	32	Trevor Thompson	7 ft 0 in (2.13 m)	250 lb (113 kg)	Jr	Virginia Tech	Indianapolis, Indiana
F	33	Keita Bates-Diop	6 ft 7 in (2.01 m)	235 lb (107 kg)	Jr	University High School (Normal, IL)	Normal, Illinois

Head coach

- Thad Matta (Butler)

Assistant coach(es)

- Dave Dickerson (Maryland)
- Chris Jent (Ohio State)
- Greg Paulus (Duke)

Legend

- (C) Team captain
- (S) Suspended
- (I) Ineligible
- (W) Walk-on
- Injured
- Current redshirt

Roster

== Schedule ==
Date time, TV	Rank^{#}	Opponent^{#}	Result	Record	High points	High rebounds	High assists	Site (attendance) city, state
Exhibition
Nov 6, 2016*; 4:00 pm, BTN+		Walsh	W 85–67		14 – Lyle	6 – 2 Tied	6 – Jackson	Value City Arena (11,724); Columbus, OH
Non-conference regular season
Nov 11, 2016*; 9:00 pm, CBSSN		at Navy; Veterans Classic	W 78–68	1–0	23 – Williams	14 – Bates-Diop	9 – Jackson	Alumni Hall (4,116); Annapolis, MD
Nov 14, 2016*; 9:00 pm, ESPNU		North Carolina Central; Global Sports Invitational	W 69–63	2–0	21 – Tate	10 – Tate	8 – Jackson	Value City Arena (9,787); Columbus, OH
Nov 17, 2016*; 7:00 pm, BTN		Providence; Gavitt Tipoff Games	W 72–67	3–0	21 – Lyle	10 – Loving	7 – Lyle	Value City Arena (11,089); Columbus, OH
Nov 21, 2016*; 7:00 pm, BTN		Western Carolina; Global Sports Invitational	W 66–38	4–0	17 – Lyle	11 – Tate	5 – Lyle	Value City Arena (10,452); Columbus, OH
Nov 23, 2016*; 7:00 pm, ESPN3		Jackson State; Global Sports Invitational	W 78–47	5–0	19 – Loving	8 – Thompson	11 – Lyle	Value City Arena (10,513); Columbus, OH
Nov 25, 2016*; 7:00 pm, BTN		Marshall; Global Sports Invitational	W 111–70	6–0	20 – 2 tied	14 – Loving	7 – Jackson	Value City Arena (14,355); Columbus, OH
Nov 30, 2016*; 9:00 pm, ESPN2		at No. 6 Virginia; ACC–Big Ten Challenge	L 61–63	6–1	14 – Tate	9 – Tate	5 – Lyle	John Paul Jones Arena (14,566); Charlottesville, VA
Dec 3, 2016*; 4:30 pm, BTN+		Fairleigh Dickinson	W 70–62	7–1	18 – Loving	13 – Thompson	5 – Lyle	Value City Arena (11,570); Columbus, OH
Dec 6, 2016*; 7:00 pm, ESPN3		Florida Atlantic	L 77–79 ^{OT}	7–2	16 – Thompson	7 – 3 tied	9 – Lyle	Value City Arena (11,862); Columbus, OH
Dec 10, 2016*; 6:00 pm, BTN		UConn	W 64–60	8–2	17 – Thompson	17 – Thompson	3 – Lyle	Value City Arena (12,313); Columbus, OH
Dec 17, 2016*; 3:00 pm, CBS		vs. No. 2 UCLA; CBS Sports Classic	L 73–86	8–3	19 – Loving	8 – Thompson	6 – Lyle	T-Mobile Arena (19,298); Paradise, NV
Dec 20, 2016*; 7:00 pm, ESPN3		Youngstown State	W 77–40	9–3	15 – Tate	15 – Thompson	10 – Lyle	Value City Arena (11,417); Columbus, OH
Dec 22, 2016*; 9:00 pm, ESPN2		UNC Asheville	W 79–77	10–3	17 – 2 tied	10 – Thompson	6 – Lyle	Value City Arena (11,480); Columbus, OH
Big Ten regular season
Jan 1, 2017; 7:00 pm, BTN		at Illinois	L 70–75	10–4 (0–1)	26 – Lyle	9 – Tate	3 – Lyle	State Farm Center (12,221); Champaign, IL
Jan 5, 2017; 7:00 pm, ESPN		No. 20 Purdue	L 75–76	10–5 (0–2)	17 – Tate	8 – Loving	4 – Lyle	Value City Arena (13,221); Columbus, OH
Jan 8, 2017; 7:30 pm, BTN		at Minnesota	L 68–78	10–6 (0–3)	20 – Tate	15 – Thompson	6 – Lyle	Williams Arena (11,267); Minneapolis, MN
Jan 12, 2017; 7:00 pm, ESPN2		at No. 18 Wisconsin	L 66–89	10–7 (0–4)	13 – Lyle	9 – Thompson	3 – Jackson	Kohl Center (17,287); Madison, WI
Jan 15, 2017; 1:30 pm, CBS		Michigan State	W 72–67	11–7 (1–4)	22 – Lyle	8 – Thompson	6 – Lyle	Value City Arena (17,449); Columbus, OH
Jan 18, 2017; 9:00 pm, BTN		at Nebraska	W 67–66	12–7 (2–4)	15 – Loving	11 – Loving	3 – Lyle	Pinnacle Bank Arena (13,842); Lincoln, NE
Jan 22, 2017; 1:00 pm, BTN		Northwestern	L 72–74	12–8 (2–5)	14 – Tate	15 – Thompson	4 – Lyle	Value City Arena (13,369); Columbus, OH
Jan 25, 2017; 7:00 pm, BTN		Minnesota	W 78–72	13–8 (3–5)	19 – 2 tied	10 – Thompson	4 – Lyle	Value City Arena (11,206); Columbus, OH
Jan 28, 2017; 8:00 pm, ESPN2		at Iowa	L 72–85	13–9 (3–6)	15 – Tate	7 – Tate	6 – Lyle	Carver–Hawkeye Arena (15,138); Iowa City, IA
Jan 31, 2017; 7:00 pm, ESPN		No. 17 Maryland	L 71–77	13–10 (3–7)	20 – Tate	9 – Thompson	6 – Lyle	Value City Arena (12,887); Columbus, OH
Feb 4, 2017; 6:00 pm, ESPN		at Michigan	W 70–66	14–10 (4–7)	17 – Loving	11 – Thompson	3 – Tate	Crisler Center (12,196); Ann Arbor, MI
Feb 8, 2017; 7:00 pm, BTN		Rutgers	W 70–64	15–10 (5–7)	23 – Williams	13 – Thompson	4 – Tate	Value City Arena (11,077); Columbus, OH
Feb 11, 2017; 4:00 pm, ESPN		at No. 21 Maryland	L 77–86	15–11 (5–8)	24 – Loving	10 – Thompson	3 – 2 tied	Xfinity Center (17,950); College Park, MD
Feb 14, 2017; 9:00 pm, ESPN		at Michigan State	L 66–74	15–12 (5–9)	22 – Loving	7 – 2 tied	5 – Lyle	Breslin Center (14,797); East Lansing, MI
Feb 18, 2017; 6:00 pm, BTN		Nebraska	L 57–58	15–13 (5–10)	14 – Tate	10 – Tate	3 – 2 tied	Value City Arena (13,044); Columbus, OH
Feb 23, 2017; 9:00 pm, ESPN		No. 16 Wisconsin	W 83–73	16–13 (6–10)	18 – Jackson	12 – Tate	4 – 2 tied	Value City Arena (11,505); Columbus, OH
Feb 28, 2017; 8:30 pm, BTN		at Penn State	W 71–70	17–13 (7–10)	17 – Lyle	9 – Tate	4 – Lyle	Bryce Jordan Center (7,343); University Park, PA
Mar 4, 2017; 12:00 pm, ESPN		Indiana	L 92–96	17–14 (7–11)	20 – Tate	11 – Thompson	6 – Tate	Value City Arena (15,560); Columbus, OH
Big Ten tournament
Mar 8, 2017; 7:00 pm	(11)	vs. (14) Rutgers; First round	L 57–66	17–15	18 – Tate	11 – Thompson	6 – Jackson	Verizon Center; Washington, D.C.
*Non-conference game. ^{#}Rankings from AP Poll. (#) Tournament seedings in parentheses. All times are in Eastern Time.

== See also ==
- 2016–17 Ohio State Buckeyes women's basketball team
