= 2016–17 Rutgers Scarlet Knights men's basketball team =

American college basketball season

2016–17 Rutgers Scarlet Knights men's basketball
- Conference: Big Ten Conference
- Record: 15–18 (3–15 Big Ten)
- Head coach: Steve Pikiell (1st season)
- Assistant coaches: Karl Hobbs; Brandin Knight; Jay Young
- Home arena: Louis Brown Athletic Center

2016–17 Big Ten Conference men's basketball standings
| | Conf. | | | | Overall |
| Team | W | | L | PCT | W | | L | PCT |
|---|---|---|---|---|---|---|---|---|
| No. 15 Purdue | 14 | – | 4 | .778 | 27 | – | 8 | .771 |
| No. 25 Wisconsin | 12 | – | 6 | .667 | 27 | – | 10 | .730 |
| Maryland | 12 | – | 6 | .667 | 24 | – | 9 | .727 |
| Minnesota | 11 | – | 7 | .611 | 24 | – | 10 | .706 |
| No. 23 Michigan † | 10 | – | 8 | .556 | 26 | – | 12 | .684 |
| Northwestern | 10 | – | 8 | .556 | 24 | – | 12 | .667 |
| Michigan State | 10 | – | 8 | .556 | 20 | – | 15 | .571 |
| Iowa | 10 | – | 8 | .556 | 19 | – | 15 | .559 |
| Illinois | 8 | – | 10 | .444 | 20 | – | 15 | .571 |
| Ohio State | 7 | – | 11 | .389 | 17 | – | 15 | .531 |
| Indiana | 7 | – | 11 | .389 | 18 | – | 16 | .529 |
| Penn State | 6 | – | 12 | .333 | 15 | – | 18 | .455 |
| Nebraska | 6 | – | 12 | .333 | 12 | – | 19 | .387 |
| Rutgers | 3 | – | 15 | .167 | 15 | – | 18 | .455 |
† 2017 Big Ten tournament winner Rankings from AP poll

The 2016–17 Rutgers Scarlet Knights men's basketball team represented Rutgers University–New Brunswick during the 2016–17 NCAA Division I men's basketball season. The Scarlet Knights, led by first-year head coach Steve Pikiell, played their home games at the Louis Brown Athletic Center in Piscataway, New Jersey as third-year members of the Big Ten Conference.

They finished the season 15–18, 3–15 in Big Ten play to finish in last place. As the No. 14 seed in the Big Ten tournament, they defeated Ohio State in the first round, marking their first ever Big Ten tournament win. However, they lost to Northwestern in the second round.

The Knights began the season 6–0 for the first time since 1975. On February 4, 2017, with a win at Penn State, Rutgers got its first ever road win in Big Ten play.

== Previous season ==
The Scarlet Knights finished the 2015–16 season with a record of 7–25, 1–17 in Big Ten play to finish in last place in conference. They lost in the first round of the Big Ten tournament to Nebraska.

On March 20, 2016, the school fired head coach Eddie Jordan after three years at Rutgers. On March 19, the school hired Steve Pikiell, former head coach at Stony Brook, as head coach.

== Departures ==
| Name | Number | Pos. | Height | Weight | Year | Hometown | Notes |
|---|---|---|---|---|---|---|---|
| D. J. Foreman | 1 | F | 6'8" | 240 | Sophomore | Spring Valley, NY | Transferred to Saint Louis |
| Bishop Daniels | 2 | G | 6'3" | 185 | Senior | Raleigh, NC | Graduated |
| Justin Goode | 10 | G | 6'2" | 185 | RS Freshman | Daleville, VA | Transferred to Broward College |
| Jalen Hyde | 23 | G | 5'8" | 165 | Senior | Somerset, NJ | Walk-on; graduated |
| Omari Grier | 31 | G | 6'4" | 180 | RS Senior | Erial, NJ | Graduated |
| Greg Lewis | 35 | F/C | 6'9" | 240 | RS Senior | Baltimore, MD | Graduated |

=== Incoming transfers ===
| Name | Number | Pos. | Height | Weight | Year | Hometown | Previous School |
|---|---|---|---|---|---|---|---|
| Candido Sa | 21 | F | 6'9" | 215 | Junior | Lisbon, Portugal | Junior college transfer from San Jacinto College |
| C. J. Gettys | 50 | C | 7'0" | 275 | RS Senior | Findlay, OH | Transferred from UNC Wilmington. Will be eligible to play immediately since Gettys graduated from UNC Wilmington. |

== 2016 recruiting class ==
College recruiting information
| Name | Hometown | School | Height | Weight | Commit date |
|---|---|---|---|---|---|
| Issa Thiam #35 SF | Jacksonville, FL | Arlington Country Day School | 6 ft 8 in (2.03 m) | 180 lb (82 kg) | Feb 1, 2016 |
| Issa Thiam #35 SF | Recruit ratings: Scout: Rivals: 247Sports: ESPN: | | | | |
| Matt Bullock #86 PF | Elizabeth, NJ | Roselle Catholic High School | 6 ft 4 in (1.93 m) | 230 lb (100 kg) | Mar 26, 2016 |
| Matt Bullock #86 PF | Recruit ratings: Scout: Rivals: 247Sports: ESPN: | | | | |
| Eugene Omoruyi; SF | Toronto, Ontario, Canada | Orangeville Prep | 6 ft 6 in (1.98 m) | 220 lb (100 kg) | Aug 2, 2016 |
| Eugene Omoruyi; SF | Recruit ratings: Scout: Rivals: 247Sports: ESPN: | | | | |
Overall recruit ranking:
Note: In many cases, Scout, Rivals, 247Sports, On3, and ESPN may conflict in their listings of height and weight.; In these cases, the average was taken. ESPN grades are on a 100-point scale.; Sources: "2016 Team Ranking". Rivals.

== Future recruits ==
=== 2017–18 team recruits ===
College recruiting information (2017)
| Name | Hometown | School | Height | Weight | Commit date |
|---|---|---|---|---|---|
| Geo Baker; CG | Boston, MA | Proctor Academy | 6 ft 4 in (1.93 m) | 170 lb (77 kg) | Jul 27, 2016 |
| Geo Baker; CG | Recruit ratings: Scout: Rivals: 247Sports: ESPN: | | | | |
| Souf Mensah; PG | Nantes, France | Marshalltown Community College | 6 ft 2 in (1.88 m) | 210 lb (95 kg) | Jan 5, 2017 |
| Souf Mensah; PG | Recruit ratings: Scout: Rivals: 247Sports: ESPN: | | | | |
Overall recruit ranking:
Note: In many cases, Scout, Rivals, 247Sports, On3, and ESPN may conflict in their listings of height and weight.; In these cases, the average was taken. ESPN grades are on a 100-point scale.; Sources: "2017 Team Ranking". Rivals.

== Roster ==
2016–17 Rutgers Scarlet Knights men's basketball team
Players
Coaches

| Pos. | # | Name | Height | Weight | Year | Previous school | Hometown |
|---|---|---|---|---|---|---|---|
| G | 0 | Nigel Johnson | 6 ft 1 in (1.85 m) | 190 lb (86 kg) | RS Jr | Riverdale Baptist School; Kansas State | Ashburn, VA |
| C | 2 | Shaquille Doorson | 7 ft 0 in (2.13 m) | 285 lb (129 kg) | RS So | Canarias Basketball Academy | Amsterdam, Netherlands |
| G | 3 | Corey Sanders | 6 ft 2 in (1.88 m) | 182 lb (83 kg) | So | Faith Baptist Christian Academy | Lakeland, FL |
| G | 4 | Jonathan Laurent | 6 ft 6 in (1.98 m) | 216 lb (98 kg) | So | Dr. Phillips | Lakeland, FL |
| G | 5 | Mike Williams | 6 ft 2 in (1.88 m) | 196 lb (89 kg) | Jr | Bishop Loughlin | Brooklyn, NY |
| F | 11 | Eugene Omoruyi | 6 ft 6 in (1.98 m) | 220 lb (100 kg) | Fr | Orangeville Prep | Ontario, Canada |
| F | 13 | Matt Bullock | 6 ft 4 in (1.93 m) | 240 lb (109 kg) | Fr | Roselle Catholic | Roselle, NJ |
| G | 15 | Jake Dadika (W) | 5 ft 11 in (1.8 m) | 166 lb (75 kg) | Jr | Spotswood | Milltown, NJ |
| F | 21 | Candido Sa | 6 ft 9 in (2.06 m) | 221 lb (100 kg) | Jr | Colégio Bartolomeu Dias; San Jacinto College | Lisbon, Portugal |
| G | 22 | Joey Downes (W) | 5 ft 11 in (1.8 m) | 160 lb (73 kg) | Fr | East Sandwich/Bridgton Academy | East Sandwich, MA |
| G | 23 | Khalil Batie (W) | 5 ft 10 in (1.78 m) | 168 lb (76 kg) | Sr | Trenton Catholic Acad. | Willingboro, NJ |
| F/C | 32 | Ibrahima Diallo | 6 ft 10 in (2.08 m) | 247 lb (112 kg) | RS So | Quality Education Academy | Dakar, Senegal |
| F | 33 | Deshawn Freeman | 6 ft 7 in (2.01 m) | 233 lb (106 kg) | RS Jr | Rocky Mount Academy; Hutchinson CC | Rocky Mount, NC |
| F | 35 | Issa Thiam | 6 ft 9 in (2.06 m) | 190 lb (86 kg) | Fr | Canarias Basketball Academy | Dakar, Senegal |
| C | 50 | C. J. Gettys | 7 ft 0 in (2.13 m) | 270 lb (122 kg) | RS Sr | Findlay; UNC Wilmington | Findlay, OH |

Head coach

- Steve Pikiell (Connecticut)

Assistant coach(es)

- Karl Hobbs (Connecticut)
- Brandin Knight (Pittsburgh)
- Jay Young (Marist)

Legend

- (C) Team captain
- (S) Suspended
- (I) Ineligible
- (W) Walk-on
- Injured
- Current redshirt

Roster

== Schedule and results ==
| Date time, TV | Rank^{#} | Opponent^{#} | Result | Record | Site (attendance) city, state |
Non-conference regular season
| Nov 11, 2016*; 7:00 pm, BTN+ | | Molloy | W 86–57 | 1–0 | Louis Brown Athletic Center (3,755); Piscataway, NJ |
| Nov 13, 2016*; 4:00 pm, BTN | | Drexel; Scarlet Knight Showcase | W 87–66 | 2–0 | Louis Brown Athletic Center (4,056); Piscataway, NJ |
| Nov 17, 2016*; 8:30 pm, FS1 | | at DePaul; Gavitt Tipoff Games | W 66–59 | 3–0 | Allstate Arena (4,057); Rosemont, IL |
| Nov 20, 2016*; 12:00 pm, BTN | | Niagara; Scarlet Knight Showcase | W 78–65 | 4–0 | Louis Brown Athletic Center (3,572); Piscataway, NJ |
| Nov 23, 2016*; 7:30 pm, BTN+ | | North Texas; Scarlet Knight Showcase | W 66–53 | 5–0 | Louis Brown Athletic Center (3,351); Piscataway, NJ |
| Nov 25, 2016*; 1:00 pm, ESPN3 | | Hartford; Scarlet Knight Showcase | W 77–75 | 6–0 | Louis Brown Athletic Center (4,028); Piscataway, NJ |
| Nov 30, 2016*; 7:00 pm, ESPNU | | at Miami (FL); ACC–Big Ten Challenge | L 61–73 | 6–1 | Watsco Center (7,064); Coral Gables, FL |
| Dec 3, 2016*; 7:00 pm, BTN+ | | Morgan State | W 72–58 | 7–1 | Louis Brown Athletic Center (5,081); Piscataway, NJ |
| Dec 6, 2016*; 7:00 pm, ESPN3 | | Central Connecticut | W 79–37 | 8–1 | Louis Brown Athletic Center (3,811); Piscataway, NJ |
| Dec 10, 2016*; 7:00 pm, ESPN3 | | at Stony Brook | W 71–66 | 9–1 | Island Federal Credit Union Arena (4,009); Stony Brook, NY |
| Dec 14, 2016*; 7:00 pm, BTN+ | | Fairleigh Dickinson | W 82–69 | 10–1 | Louis Brown Athletic Center (3,635); Piscataway, NJ |
| Dec 18, 2016*; 1:00 pm | | vs. Fordham; Madison Square Garden Holiday Festival | W 68–53 | 11–1 | Madison Square Garden (8,200); New York City, NY |
| Dec 23, 2016*; 6:30 pm, FS1 | | at Seton Hall; Rivalry/Garden State Hardwood Classic | L 61–72 | 11–2 | Prudential Center (10,481); Newark, NJ |
Big Ten regular season
| Dec 27, 2016; 7:00 pm, ESPN2 | | at No. 14 Wisconsin | L 52–72 | 11–3 (0–1) | Kohl Center (17,287); Wisconsin, WI |
| Jan 1, 2017; 2:30 pm, ESPNU | | Penn State | L 47–60 | 11–4 (0–2) | Louis Brown Athletic Center (6,079); Piscataway, NJ |
| Jan 4, 2017; 6:30 pm, BTN | | at Michigan State | L 65–93 | 11–5 (0–3) | Breslin Center (17,797); East Lansing, MI |
| Jan 8, 2017; 4:30 pm, BTN | | at Iowa | L 62–68 | 11–6 (0–4) | Carver–Hawkeye Arena (11,347); Iowa, IA |
| Jan 12, 2017; 9:00 pm, ESPNU | | Northwestern | L 60–69 | 11–7 (0–5) | Louis Brown Athletic Center (3,723); Piscataway, NJ |
| Jan 15, 2017; 12:00 pm, BTN | | at Indiana | L 57–76 | 11–8 (0–6) | Assembly Hall (17,222); Bloomington, IN |
| Jan 21, 2017; 12:00 pm, ESPNU | | Nebraska | W 65–64 | 12–8 (1–6) | Louis Brown Athletic Center (6,294); Piscataway, NJ |
| Jan 24, 2017; 7:00 pm, BTN | | at No. 22 Maryland | L 55–67 | 12–9 (1–7) | Xfinity Center (17,950); College Park, MD |
| Jan 28, 2017; 12:00 pm, BTN | | vs. No. 15 Wisconsin; B1G Super Saturday | L 54–61 ^{OT} | 12–10 (1–8) | Madison Square Garden (8,531); New York City, NY |
| Jan 31, 2017; 7:00 pm, BTN | | Iowa | L 63–83 | 12–11 (1–9) | Louis Brown Athletic Center (4,389); Piscataway, NJ |
| Feb 4, 2017; 1:00 pm, ESPNU | | at Penn State | W 70–68 | 13–11 (2–9) | Bryce Jordan Center (9,529); University Park, PA |
| Feb 8, 2017; 7:00 pm, BTN | | at Ohio State | L 64–70 | 13–12 (2–10) | Value City Arena (11,077); Columbus, OH |
| Feb 11, 2017; 12:00 pm, ESPNU | | Minnesota | L 63–72 | 13–13 (2–11) | Louis Brown Athletic Center (6,008); Piscataway, NJ |
| Feb 14, 2017; 7:00 pm, BTN | | at No. 16 Purdue | L 55–74 | 13–14 (2–12) | Mackey Arena (14,534); West Lafayette, IN |
| Feb 18, 2017; 6:00 pm, ESPNU | | at Northwestern | L 65–69 | 13–15 (2–13) | Welsh-Ryan Arena (8,117); Evanston, IL |
| Feb 22, 2017; 6:30 pm, BTN | | Michigan | L 64–68 | 13–16 (2–14) | Louis Brown Athletic Center (5,369); Piscataway, NJ |
| Feb 28, 2017; 6:30 pm, BTN | | Maryland | L 59–79 | 13–17 (2–15) | Louis Brown Athletic Center (6,017); Piscataway, NJ |
| Mar 4, 2017; 12:00 pm, ESPNU | | Illinois | W 62–59 | 14–17 (3–15) | Louis Brown Athletic Center (5,706); Piscataway, NJ |
Big Ten Conference tournament
| Mar 8, 2017; 4:30 pm, BTN | (14) | vs. (11) Ohio State; First round | W 66–57 | 15–17 | Verizon Center; Washington, D.C. |
| Mar 9, 2017; 8:30 pm, BTN | (14) | vs. (6) Northwestern; Second round | L 61-83 | 15–18 | Verizon Center (12,408); Washington, D.C. |
*Non-conference game. ^{#}Rankings from AP Poll. (#) Tournament seedings in parentheses. All times are in Eastern Time.

== See also ==
- 2016–17 Rutgers Scarlet Knights women's basketball team
