= 2016–17 Michigan Wolverines men's basketball team =

American college basketball season

2016–17 Michigan Wolverines men's basketball

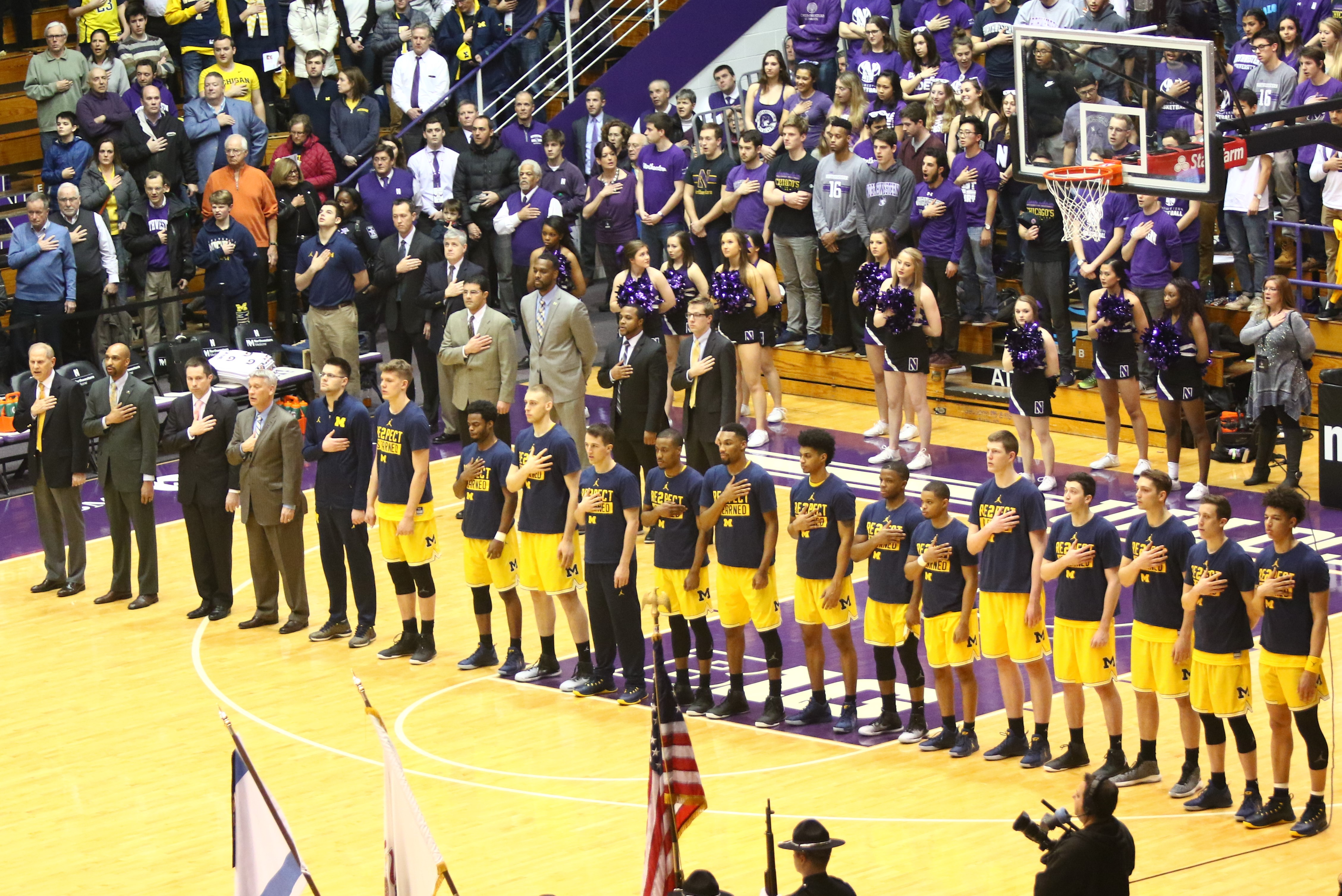

Big Ten tournament champions 2K Sports Classic champions

NCAA tournament, Sweet Sixteen
- Conference: Big Ten Conference

Ranking
- Coaches: No. 17
- AP: No. 23
- Record: 26–12 (10–8 Big Ten)
- Head coach: John Beilein (10th season)
- Assistant coaches: Jeff Meyer; Billy Donlon; Saddi Washington
- MVP: Derrick Walton
- Captains: Derrick Walton; Zak Irvin
- Home arena: Crisler Center

2016–17 Big Ten Conference men's basketball standings
	Conf.				Overall
Team	W		L	PCT	W		L	PCT
No. 15 Purdue	14	–	4	.778	27	–	8	.771
No. 25 Wisconsin	12	–	6	.667	27	–	10	.730
Maryland	12	–	6	.667	24	–	9	.727
Minnesota	11	–	7	.611	24	–	10	.706
No. 23 Michigan †	10	–	8	.556	26	–	12	.684
Northwestern	10	–	8	.556	24	–	12	.667
Michigan State	10	–	8	.556	20	–	15	.571
Iowa	10	–	8	.556	19	–	15	.559
Illinois	8	–	10	.444	20	–	15	.571
Ohio State	7	–	11	.389	17	–	15	.531
Indiana	7	–	11	.389	18	–	16	.529
Penn State	6	–	12	.333	15	–	18	.455
Nebraska	6	–	12	.333	12	–	19	.387
Rutgers	3	–	15	.167	15	–	18	.455
† 2017 Big Ten tournament winner Rankings from AP poll

The 2016–17 Michigan Wolverines men's basketball team represented the University of Michigan during the 2016–17 NCAA Division I men's basketball season. The Wolverines, led by head coach John Beilein in his tenth year, played their home games for the 50th consecutive year at the Crisler Center in Ann Arbor, Michigan. This season marked the program's 101st season and its 100th consecutive year as a member of the Big Ten Conference. The team earned the 2017 Big Ten Conference tournament championship and reached the Sweet Sixteen round of the 2017 NCAA Division I men's basketball tournament.

The entering class included 2016 Ohio Gatorade Player of the Year and Ohio Mr. Basketball Zavier Simpson. The departing class included graduating seniors Caris LeVert and Spike Albrecht who were both injured midway through the prior season. Sophomores Aubrey Dawkins, Kameron Chatman and Ricky Doyle transferred out of the program. The team also lost assistant coaches Bacari Alexander and LaVall Jordan who had both been with the team for six seasons.

Senior co-captain Derrick Walton earned second-team All-Big Ten recognition during the 2016–17 Big Ten Conference men's basketball season. Moe Wagner and Zak Irvin were honorable mention All-Big Ten selections. The team enjoyed a healthy season in which its top 8 scorers played in all 38 games.

== Departures ==
Caris LeVert and Spike Albrecht graduated during their senior seasons for the 2015–16 Michigan Wolverines men's basketball team. Albrecht used the graduate transfer option to play a fifth year for the 2016–17 Purdue Boilermakers men's basketball team. Ricky Doyle announced he would transfer to another program for his final two seasons of eligibility. Due to NCAA transfer rules, he would have to sit out the 2016–17 season before becoming eligible. On April 1, Beilein decided not to restrict Doyle or Albrecht from transferring to schools within the Big Ten if they desired to do so. On April 6, 2016, Aubrey Dawkins transferred to play for the UCF Knights, where his father, Johnny Dawkins, had been named head coach two weeks prior. The following day, assistant coach LaVall Jordan, who had spent the prior 6 seasons with Michigan, was hired as the head coach of Milwaukee Panthers men's basketball. On April 20, the story broke that assistant coach Bacari Alexander, who had spent the prior 6 seasons with Michigan, would leave to be hired as the head coach of Detroit Titans men's basketball. On May 3, 2016, Albrecht announced he would play his final year of collegiate basketball for the Purdue Boilermakers. On that same day, Kameron Chatman announced his intention to transfer with two years of eligibility remaining. On May 4, Billy Donlon and Saddi Washington were named assistant head coaches. On May 17, Doyle announced his decision to play for the Florida Gulf Coast Eagles, which became official 2 days later. On June 8, Chatman announced that he would transfer to play at Detroit under Alexander after sitting out one season.

== Preseason ==
On October 11, 2016, a panel of conference media selected a 10-member preseason All-Big Ten Team and Derrick Walton was among the honorees. Zak Irvin and Walton represented the team at the October 13 Big Ten Basketball Media Day held in Washington, D.C. Michigan began the season unranked, but received votes in the preseason Coaches' Poll. The team scheduled its third annual Open Practice, Selfie Promotion day for October 25. According to SB Nation Irvin (#11), Walton (#16) and Muhammad Ali Abdur Rahkman (#23) were among the 25 best players entering the season in the Big Ten Conference. On November 1, Michigan announced that the team would have an anthem buddy program for youth between age 8 and 11 to stand for the anthem with their favorite player. Walton and Irvin served as co-captains.

== 2016–17 recruits ==
On August 7, 2014, Jon Teske, who lived in Grand Rapids, Michigan suburb of Grandville until he was 10 and his family moved to Medina, Ohio, committed to Michigan via Twitter. On April 16, 2015, Austin Davis of Onsted, Michigan committed to Michigan. On May 11, Tyus Battle committed to Michigan. At the time of Battle's signing, the entire set of scholarships for the class of 2016 seemed to be allocated. On June 19, Battle decommitted from Michigan. On July 28, Ibi Watson committed to Michigan from Caris LeVert's alma mater Pickerington High School Central. On September 9, Zavier Simpson committed to the team. At the time he was ranked as the number 66 player and number 12 point guard by ESPN, number 55 and number 12 by Scout.com and number 87 player and number 44 guard by Rivals.com, making him the number 69 player and 13 point guard by 247Sports.com. Davis, Teske, Watson and Simpson all signed their National Letters of Intent on November 11, 2015. Michigan announced that sophomore Fred Wright-Jones (a team manager as a freshman and NCAA-recognized official practice player after injuries to LeVert and Albrecht) would join the team as a walk-on.

College recruiting
Name	Hometown	School	Height	Weight	Commit date
Austin Davis; C	Onsted, MI	Onsted High School (MI)	6 ft 10 in (2.08 m)	241.3 lb (109.5 kg)	Apr 16, 2015
Austin Davis; C	Recruit ratings: Scout: Rivals: 247Sports: ESPN:				
Jon Teske; C	Medina, OH	Medina Senior High School (OH)	6 ft 10 in (2.08 m)	220 lb (100 kg)	Jul 8, 2014
Jon Teske; C	Recruit ratings: Scout: Rivals: 247Sports: ESPN:				
Ibi Watson; SG	Pickerington, OH	Pickerington High School Central (OH)	6 ft 4.5 in (1.94 m)	175 lb (79 kg)	Jul 28, 2015
Ibi Watson; SG	Recruit ratings: Scout: Rivals: 247Sports: ESPN:				
Zavier Simpson; PG	Lima, OH	Lima Senior High School (OH)	5 ft 10.5 in (1.79 m)	160 lb (73 kg)	Sep 9, 2015
Zavier Simpson; PG	Recruit ratings: Scout: Rivals: 247Sports: ESPN:				
Overall recruit ranking:
Note: In many cases, Scout, Rivals, 247Sports, On3, and ESPN may conflict in their listings of height and weight.; In these cases, the average was taken. ESPN grades are on a 100-point scale.; Sources: "Michigan 2016 Basketball Commitments". Rivals.; "2016 Michigan Basketball Commits". Scout.; "ESPN Recruiting Nation Basketball". ESPN.; "Scout.com Team Recruiting Rankings". Scout.; "2016 Team Ranking". Rivals.

Among the accomplishments of the recruits are Simpson earning the 2015 Ohio Associated Press Division I Player of the Year and Davis earning the 2015 Michigan Associated Press Class B Player of the Year awards as juniors as well as Simpson's 2014 Ohio Division III state championship.

Simpson was named 2016 Ohio Mr. Basketball by the Associated Press. Simpson's Lima Senior High School was undefeated until losing in the OHSAA Division I championship game to Westerville South High School, finishing the season 29–1. Simpson also earned the Ohio Boys Basketball Gatorade Player of the Year honor. Michigan recruits Simpson, Ibi Watson and Jon Teske were all named to the 2015–16 Associated Press Ohio high school Division I boys basketball all-state 1st team. ESPN's Jeff Borzello named Simpson as one of the top 25 entering freshman in the 2016–17 class on April 6, 2016. Austin Davis finished second in the Mr. Basketball of Michigan voting to Michigan State commit Cassius Winston of University of Detroit Jesuit High School and Academy. Davis repeated as Michigan Associated Press Class B Player of the Year.

== Future recruits ==
=== 2017–18 ===
On October 23, 2015, four-star recruit Jordan Poole became the first commitment for the Class of 2017 after home gym visit from Beilein and assistant coach Jordan and multiple Michigan campus visits. Poole had several competing offers including Illinois, Indiana, Nebraska, Memphis, Marquette, and Auburn. As a junior, Poole was a 2016 WBCA All-State Boys Basketball first team selection. On June 20, 2016, reports confirmed that Michigan had recruited Kentucky transfer Charles Matthews, who played his freshman season for the 2015–16 Kentucky Wildcats. Matthews would have to sit out the 2016–17 season. Michigan confirmed the story on July 1. The same day, Poole announced that he would transfer from Rufus King High School in Wisconsin to La Lumiere School in Indiana, where he would experience a campus lifestyle, play a schedule with several ESPN broadcasts, and be teamed up with unsigned class of 2017 prospects Brian Bowen and Jeremiah Tilmon. On July 19, Spring Grove Area High School point guard Eli Brooks, committed to Michigan over offers such as defending national champion Villanova, Ohio State, N.C. State, Temple and Kansas State. On August 7, Isaiah Livers committed to Michigan over contenders Michigan State, Butler, Minnesota, California and Boston College.

Livers was named 2017 Michigan Gatorade Player of the Year and Mr. Basketball of Michigan. He is Michigan's 11th Mr. Basketball of Michigan, but the first since Manny Harris in 2007. Poole was a member of the 2017 Dick's National High School Champion La Lumiere team.

College recruiting (2017)
Name	Hometown	School	Height	Weight	Commit date
Jordan Poole; SG	Milwaukee, WI	Rufus King High School (WI)/La Lumiere School (IN)	6 ft 3.5 in (1.92 m)	180 lb (82 kg)	Oct 23, 2015
Jordan Poole; SG	Recruit ratings: Scout: Rivals: 247Sports: ESPN:				
Eli Brooks; PG	Spring Grove, PA	Spring Grove High School (PA)	6 ft 1 in (1.85 m)	170 lb (77 kg)	Jul 19, 2016
Eli Brooks; PG	Recruit ratings: ESPN:				
Isaiah Livers; PF	Kalamazoo, MI	Kalamazoo Central High School (MI)	6 ft 7.5 in (2.02 m)	202.5 lb (91.9 kg)	Jul 8, 2016
Isaiah Livers; PF	Recruit ratings: Scout: Rivals: 247Sports: ESPN:				
Overall recruit ranking:
Note: In many cases, Scout, Rivals, 247Sports, On3, and ESPN may conflict in their listings of height and weight.; In these cases, the average was taken. ESPN grades are on a 100-point scale.; Sources: "Michigan 2017 Basketball Commitments". Rivals.; "2017 Michigan Basketball Commits". Scout.; "ESPN Recruiting Nation Basketball". ESPN.; "Scout.com Team Recruiting Rankings". Scout.; "2017 Team Ranking". Rivals.

=== 2018–19 ===
On December 22, 2016, junior recruit David DeJulius became the first commitment for the Class of 2018 after receiving a December 17 offer following his career-high 46-point, 7-rebound, 5-assist performance of December 17 in leading East English Village Preparatory Academy over Dakota High School and Michigan State signee Thomas Kithier.

College recruiting (2018)
Name	Hometown	School	Height	Weight	Commit date
David DeJulius; PG	Detroit, MI	East English Village Preparatory Academy (MI)	6 ft 0.5 in (1.84 m)	190 lb (86 kg)	Dec 22, 2016
David DeJulius; PG	Recruit ratings: Scout: Rivals: 247Sports: ESPN:				
Overall recruit ranking:
Note: In many cases, Scout, Rivals, 247Sports, On3, and ESPN may conflict in their listings of height and weight.; In these cases, the average was taken. ESPN grades are on a 100-point scale.; Sources: "Michigan 2018 Basketball Commitments". Rivals.; "2018 Michigan Basketball Commits". Scout.; "ESPN Recruiting Nation Basketball". ESPN.; "Scout.com Team Recruiting Rankings". Scout.; "2018 Team Ranking". Rivals.

== Season summary ==
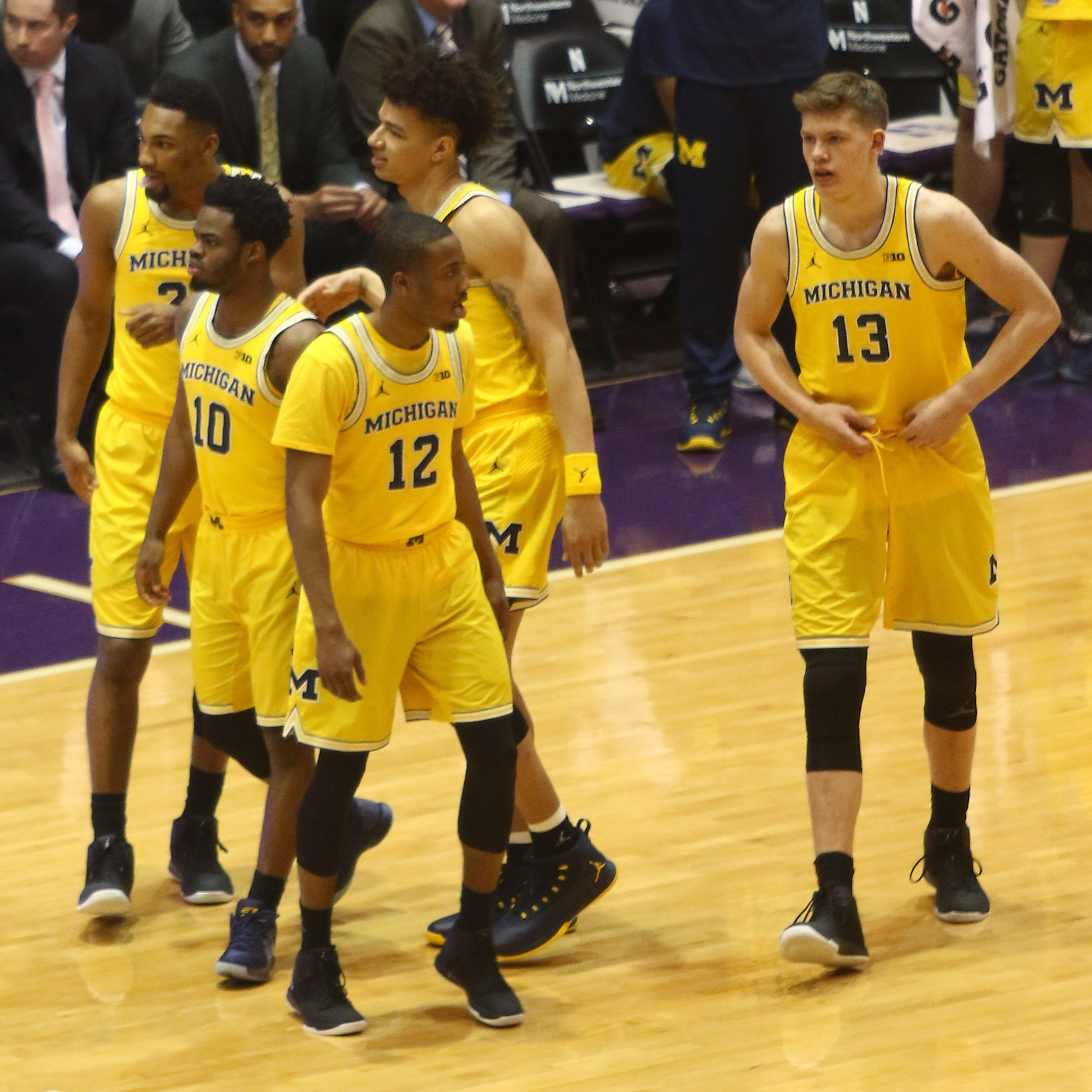
The starting 5 (left to right): Zak Irvin, Derrick Walton, Muhammad-Ali Abdur-Rahkman (front), D. J. Wilson and Moe Wagner

=== November ===
On November 4, the team played an exhibition game against Armstrong State, winning 77–49. Wagner and Irvin led the team with scoring in the exhibition with 15 points each. Muhammad-Ali Abdur-Rahkman sat out the exhibition with an ankle injury. Michigan opened the season on November 11 against Howard, winning 76–58. Derrick Walton led the team in scoring with 20 points, including four three-pointers, while D.J. Wilson led the team in rebounding with eight rebounds to go along with nine points playing in 20 minutes off the bench. Additionally, Rahkman returned from his ankle injury reclaiming his spot in the starting line-up. On November 13, Michigan defeated IUPUI, 77–65. Zak Irvin led the team in scoring with 15 points, as four Wolverines finished the game with double-digit points, while Wilson led the team in rebounds with 14, to go along with seven points and five blocks playing in 30 minutes off the bench. In the semifinal round of the 2016 2K Sports Classic held at Madison Square Garden on November 17, Michigan defeated Marquette 79–61 behind a team-high 16 points from Irvin and 4 other double digit scoring efforts, including D. J. Wilson's first career double-double (10 points and 12 rebounds). The following night, Michigan won the tournament by defeating SMU 76–54. Walton made seven three-point shots and scored 23, while Irvin added another 16 to earn tournament MVP. On November 23, Michigan suffered its first loss of the season to South Carolina, 61–46. Michigan was led by Walton with a team-high 15 points. Michigan scored 24 of its 46 points from the free throw line, shooting just 19 percent (10-for-52) from the field, including 2-for-26 from three-point range. On November 26, Michigan defeated Mount St. Mary's, 64–47. Michigan was led by Irvin with 14 points, as the Wolverines used a 25–4 run to turn a four-point deficit into a 17-point halftime lead. On November 30, Michigan lost to Virginia Tech 73–70 in the ACC–Big Ten Challenge. Michigan was led by Irvin with a game-high 23 points, as the Hokies rallied from a nine-point deficit at halftime to take their first lead of the game with 1:46 remaining and hold on to win.

=== December ===
On December 3, Michigan defeated Kennesaw State 82–55. Michigan was led by Moritz Wagner with a career-high 20 points, while D.J. Wilson posted his second double-double of the season with 15 points and 11 rebounds. Michigan used a 19–4 run to end the first half to take an 18-point lead into the halftime break. Michigan emerged victorious against Texas on December 6. Michigan led by as many as 10 in the first half, but neither team led by more than 3 in the final 17 minutes. Wagner led the team with 15 points including a putback that gave the team the lead with 18.8 seconds left followed by a blocked shot on the subsequent defensive stand. On December 10, Michigan lost to (#2 AP Poll/#2 Coaches Poll) UCLA 102–84. Michigan was led by Irvin with 18 points, 7 assists and 5 rebounds. The two teams combined for 22 three-pointers in the first half, as Michigan's first 18 points of the game came from beyond the arc. The game was tied 50–50 at halftime, however, Michigan made just three field goals in the final seven minutes of the game, as UCLA pulled away with the victory. With nine points, Walton became the 51st Wolverine in program history to score 1,000 career points. On December 13, Michigan defeated Central Arkansas by a 97–53 margin on the strength of a school record 19 three-point shots. On December 17, Michigan defeated Maryland Eastern Shore 98–49. Michigan's 49-point victory was a season high and the 10th-largest margin of victory in program history. Michigan was led by Walton with a game-high 21 points, while Wilson scored a career-high 16 points. Michigan recorded a season-high 28 assists as a team, assisting on 28-of-34 made field goals, led by Abdur-Rahkman's career-high 10 assists. Fred Wright-Jones recorded his first career points on a three-pointer. On December 22, Michigan defeated Furman 68–62. Michigan was led by Wagner with a game-high 18 points and six rebounds. Michigan was a perfect 16-for-16 from the free throw line, shooting 100 percent from the line for the first time since 2014–15. With the win, John Beilein earned his 750th career win.

=== January ===
On January 1, Michigan lost to Iowa 86–83 in overtime in its Big Ten conference opener. Wilson posted his third career double-double of the season with a career-high 28 points and 14 rebounds. On January 4, Michigan defeated Penn State 72–69. Michigan trailed 36–29, at halftime, and Penn State led by as many as 14 points in the second half, before the Wolverines outscored the Nittany Lions 32–15, over the final 12-plus minutes of the game for the comeback win. With the win, head coach John Beilein became the second coach in program history to reach 200 wins with the Wolverines, joining Johnny Orr, who is the all-time leader with 209. On January 7, Michigan lost to Maryland 77–70. Michigan was led by Wagner who scored 15 of his team-high 17 points in the second half. On January 11, Michigan lost to Illinois 85–69. Michigan was led by Wilson with a team-high 19 points. On January 14, Michigan defeated Nebraska 91–85. Three Wolverines reached the 20-point mark, including a career-high 23 points from Wagner. On January 17, Michigan lost to (#17/#17) Wisconsin 68–64. Michigan was led by Irvin with a game-high 20 points. After trailing by five points at halftime, Michigan used a 17–2 run to take an eight-point lead, with 12:40 left in the game. Wisconsin then went on a 15–0 run to regain the lead for good. On January 21, Michigan defeated Illinois 66–57. Michigan was led by Wilson with a game-high 19 points, while Walton posted his first double-double of the season with 13 points and 11 rebounds. On January 26, Michigan defeated Indiana 90–60. Michigan's 30-point win is the second-largest margin of victory over the Hoosiers in program history (+48, February 22, 1998, by the 1997–98 Wolverines over the 1997–98 Hoosiers). Six Wolverines scored in double figures, including all five starters, led by Walton with a game-high 21 points. It was the first time Michigan had six players in double digits since December 12, 2015, against Delaware State. On January 29, Michigan lost their rivalry game to Michigan State 70–62. Michigan was led by Walton with a season-high 24 points. The loss was Michigan's fifth straight loss to MSU.

=== February ===
On February 4, Michigan lost to Ohio State 70–66. Walton posted his second double-double of the season with a season-high 25 points, and 10 rebounds. On February 7, Michigan defeated rival Michigan State 86–57. The win snapped a five-game losing streak against Michigan State. With his 20 points, eight assists and five rebounds, Walton became the third player in Michigan program history to reach 1,000 points, 400 rebounds and 400 assists, joining Gary Grant and Jalen Rose. Michigan's 29-point victory was the largest margin of victory in the series since 1996, when Michigan also won by 29-points, 75–46. The Wolverines forced the Spartans into 21 turnovers and outscoring them 30–7 in points off turnovers. The last time Michigan forced 20 or more turnovers was on November 14, 2011, against Towson. Michigan shot 60 percent from the field, the first time the Spartans defense allowed an opponent to shoot over 50 percent from the field all season. On February 12, Michigan defeated Indiana 75–63. Michigan was led by Walton with a game-high 25 points, his fifth consecutive 20-plus point game. Wagner posted his first career double-double with 11 points and 10 rebounds. The win marked the Wolverines first win at Assembly Hall since 2009, and the first time they defeated Indiana twice in the same Big Ten season since 1994–95. It was the team's first road win. Walton earned Co-Big Ten Player of the Week honors on February 13. On February 16, Michigan defeated (#11/#10) Wisconsin 64–58, earning their first win over a ranked opponent of the season. Michigan was led by Wagner with a team-high 21 points. With five rebounds in the game, Walton became the first player in program history to record 1,000 points, 500 rebounds and 400 assists. On February 19, Michigan lost to Minnesota 83–78 in overtime. Michigan was led by Walton and Wilson with 16 points each. On February 22, Michigan defeated Rutgers 68–64. Michigan was led by Irvin with a game-high 16 points. With the win, Beilein earned his 500th career win in Division I play. On February 25, Michigan defeated (#14/#14) Purdue 82–70. Michigan was led by Wagner with a career-high 24 points, including 22 points in the first half. Walton posted his third double-double of the season with 17 points and 11 rebounds.

=== March ===
On March 1, Michigan lost to Northwestern 67–65, following a buzzer beater layup from Dererk Pardon. Michigan was led by Walton with a team-high 15 points. On March 5, Michigan handed Nebraska its worst loss in program history (36-point margin) and set a record for opposition points scored (93) in Pinnacle Bank Arena in the final regular season contest of the year. Walton posted his fourth double-double of the season with a game-high 18 points, and set a Michigan single-game record with 16 assists, surpassing Gary Grant. With the win, head coach John Beilein tied Johnny Orr for most wins in Michigan program history with 209. Walton earned a second Co-Big Ten Player of the Week honors on March 6.

=== Postseason ===
On March 8, the team plane slid off the runway after it aborted a takeoff at Willow Run Airport to depart for the 2017 Big Ten Conference men's basketball tournament. Despite damage to the plane, all passengers were unharmed. As a result, the team did not arrive at the tournament until less than 90 minutes before the scheduled noon tip-off on March 9. The team played in practice uniforms, jumped out to an early 31–11 lead and went on to defeat Illinois by a 75–55 score. Michigan never trailed in the game, which gave Beilein his 210th victory at Michigan, a new school record (surpassing Johnny Orr). On March 10, Michigan defeated (#12/#13) Purdue 74–70 in overtime during the quarterfinals of the Big Ten tournament. Michigan was led by Wilson with a game-high 26 points. There were 18 lead changes and 14 ties during a closely contested game. Neither team led by more than four points in the second half. On March 11, Michigan defeated Minnesota 84–77 during the semifinals of the Big Ten tournament. Michigan was led by Walton with a career-high 29 points, and a game-high nine assists. Walton scored or assisted on 18 of Michigan's final 20 points. The 47 points allowed by Minnesota are the most the Golden Gophers have conceded in a first half this season. With the win, Michigan advanced to the Big Ten tournament final for the first time since 2014 and the third time in program history. Seeded eighth, Michigan is the lowest seed to reach the Big Ten tournament Final since 2008. On March 12, Michigan defeated (#23/#24) Wisconsin 71–56 to claim their first Big Ten tournament championship since 1998. Michigan was led by Walton with a game-high 22 points, and seven assists, and was named tournament MVP. Irvin recorded 15 points, seven rebounds and five assists, and was named to the All-Tournament Team. As the No. 8 seed, Michigan became the lowest-seeded team ever to win the Big Ten tournament.

In the first round of the 2017 NCAA tournament, Michigan defeated Oklahoma State by a 92–91 margin on the strength of a school NCAA Tournament record 16 three-point shots (on 29 attempts, including 11–15 three-point shooting in the second half). Michigan's 16 three-point field goals also tied the Big Ten record for an NCAA Tournament game. The team was led by Derrick Walton's 26 points. With 26 points, 11 assists and five rebounds, Walton was the first player with at least 25 points, ten assists and five rebounds in a tournament game since Dwyane Wade in 2003. On March 19, Michigan defeated Louisville 73–69 in a rematch of the 2013 NCAA Division I Men's Basketball Championship Game to advance to the Sweet 16 for the first time since 2014, and third time in the past five seasons. Michigan was led by Wagner with a career-high 26 points. Wagner's 26 points were the most by a Wolverine in an NCAA Tournament game since Ray Jackson scored 28 points against Western Kentucky in the first round of the 1995 NCAA Division I men's basketball tournament. Michigan led the country in fewest turnovers per game with just 9.2 turnovers per contest. Michigan set a new program record with 350 made three-pointers this season. After the first week of the tournament, the seventh seeded Wolverines were regarded by some media outlets as the "feel-good story of the NCAA tournament". On March 23, Michigan lost to Oregon 69–68. Michigan was led by Walton with a game-high 20 points, as Walton and Irvin scored 26 of Michigan's 35 second-half points.

== Schedule and results ==
The 18-game set of games against Big Ten opponents was announced on June 20 without dates. On July 27, the 14 game preconference schedule was announced including the first games of three home-and-home series against Texas, UCLA and South Carolina. The final schedule was announced on August 25.

Date time, TV	Rank^{#}	Opponent^{#}	Result	Record	High points	High rebounds	High assists	Site (attendance) city, state
Exhibition
November 4, 2016*; 7:00 pm, BTN+		Armstrong State	W 77–49		15 – 2 tied	9 – Wilson	7 – Walton	Crisler Center (10,720); Ann Arbor, MI
Non-conference regular season
November 11, 2016*; 9:00 pm, BTN+		Howard; 2K Sports Classic regional round	W 76–58	1–0	20 – Walton	8 – Wilson	3 – 2 tied	Crisler Center (12,707); Ann Arbor, MI
November 13, 2016*; 12:00 pm, ESPNU		IUPUI; 2K Sports Classic regional round	W 77–65	2–0	15 – Irvin	14 – Wilson	3 – 2 tied	Crisler Center (10,812); Ann Arbor, MI
November 17, 2016*; 9:30 pm, ESPN2		vs. Marquette; 2K Sports Classic semifinals	W 79–61	3–0	16 – Irvin	12 – Wilson	6 – Irvin	Madison Square Garden (8,126); Manhattan, NY
November 18, 2016*; 7:00 pm, ESPN2		vs. SMU; 2K Sports Classic	W 76–54	4–0	23 – Walton	6 – Irvin	6 – Walton	Madison Square Garden (8,088); Manhattan, NY
November 23, 2016*; 5:00 pm, ESPNU	No. 25-t	at South Carolina	L 46–61	4–1	15 – Walton	4 – 5 tied	1 – 2 tied	Colonial Life Arena (13,051); Columbia, SC
November 26, 2016*; 7:00 pm, ESPN3	No. 25-t	Mount St. Mary's	W 64–47	5–1	14 – Irvin	7 – Wilson	5 – Walton	Crisler Center (9,410); Ann Arbor, MI
November 30, 2016*; 7:00 pm, ESPN2		Virginia Tech; ACC–Big Ten Challenge	L 70–73	5–2	23 – Irvin	6 – Abdur-Rahkman	5 – Walton	Crisler Center (9,981); Ann Arbor, MI
December 3, 2016*; 1:00 pm, BTN+		Kennesaw State	W 82–55	6–2	20 – Wagner	11 – Wilson	8 – Walton	Crisler Center (10,687); Ann Arbor, MI
December 6, 2016*; 9:00 pm, ESPN2		Texas	W 53–50	7–2	15 – Wagner	6 – Wilson	5 – Irvin	Crisler Center (10,613); Ann Arbor, MI
December 10, 2016*; 8:00 pm, ESPN2		at No. 2 UCLA	L 84–102	7–3	18 – Irvin	5 – Irvin	7 – Irvin	Pauley Pavilion (13,571); Los Angeles, CA
December 13, 2016*; 9:00 pm, BTN		Central Arkansas	W 97–53	8–3	18 – Irvin	7 – 2 tied	6 – Walton	Crisler Center (9,486); Ann Arbor, MI
December 17, 2016*; 3:00 pm, BTN		Maryland Eastern Shore	W 98–49	9–3	21 – Walton	6 – 3 tied	10 – Abdur-Rahkman	Crisler Center (12,020); Ann Arbor, MI
December 22, 2016*; 7:00 pm, BTN		Furman	W 68–62	10–3	18 – Wagner	6 – Wagner	7 – Irvin	Crisler Center (10,634); Ann Arbor, MI
Big Ten Regular season
January 1, 2017; 2:15 pm, BTN		at Iowa	L 83–86 ^{OT}	10–4 (0–1)	28 – Wilson	14 – Wilson	6 – 2 tied	Carver-Hawkeye Arena (13,988); Iowa City, IA
January 4, 2017; 8:30 pm, BTN		Penn State	W 72–69	11–4 (1–1)	14 – 2 tied	6 – Walton	4 – Irvin	Crisler Center (11,385); Ann Arbor, MI
January 7, 2017; 3:15 pm, ESPN2		Maryland	L 70–77	11–5 (1–2)	17 – Wagner	6 – Donnal	3 – 2 tied	Crisler Center (11,527); Ann Arbor, MI
January 11, 2017; 9:00 pm, BTN		at Illinois	L 69–85	11–6 (1–3)	19 – Wilson	6 – Irvin	7 – Walton	State Farm Center (11,404); Champaign, IL
January 14, 2017; 2:00 pm, BTN		Nebraska	W 91–85	12–6 (2–3)	23 – Wagner	6 – Wagner	7 – Irvin	Crisler Center (11,145); Ann Arbor, MI
January 17, 2017; 9:00 pm, ESPN		at No. 17 Wisconsin	L 64–68	12–7 (2–4)	20 – Irvin	6 – 2 tied	3 – Irvin	Kohl Center (17,287); Madison, WI
January 21, 2017; 2:15 pm, BTN		Illinois	W 66–57	13–7 (3–4)	19 – Wilson	11 – Walton	5 – Wilson	Crisler Center (12,234); Ann Arbor, MI
January 26, 2017; 9:00 pm, ESPN2		Indiana	W 90–60	14–7 (4–4)	21 – Walton	5 – Wilson	5 – Walton	Crisler Center (11,267); Ann Arbor, MI
January 29, 2017; 1:00 pm, CBS		at Michigan State; Rivalry	L 62–70	14–8 (4–5)	24 – Walton	9 – Walton	5 – Walton	Breslin Center (14,797); East Lansing, MI
February 4, 2017; 6:00 pm, ESPN2		Ohio State	L 66–70	14–9 (4–6)	25 – Walton	10 – Walton	3 – 2 tied	Crisler Center (12,196); Ann Arbor, MI
February 7, 2017; 9:00 pm, ESPN		Michigan State	W 86–57	15–9 (5–6)	20 – Walton	6 – Wagner	8 – Walton	Crisler Center (11,864); Ann Arbor, MI
February 12, 2017; 1:00 pm, CBS		at Indiana	W 75–63	16–9 (6–6)	25 – Walton	10 – Wagner	4 – Walton	Assembly Hall (17,222); Bloomington, IN
February 16, 2017; 7:00 pm, ESPN		No. 11 Wisconsin	W 64–58	17–9 (7–6)	21 – Wagner	5 – 2 tied	8 – Walton	Crisler Center (12,128); Ann Arbor, MI
February 19, 2017; 7:00 pm, BTN		at Minnesota	L 78–83 ^{OT}	17–10 (7–7)	16 – 2 tied	7 – Wilson	5 – 2 tied	Williams Arena (12,091); Minneapolis, MN
February 22, 2017; 6:30 pm, BTN		at Rutgers	W 68–64	18–10 (8–7)	16 – Irvin	11 – Wilson	5 – Walton	The RAC (5,369); Piscataway, NJ
February 25, 2017; 4:00 pm, ESPN2		No. 14 Purdue	W 82–70	19–10 (9–7)	24 – Wagner	11 – Walton	5 – Walton	Crisler Center (12,707); Ann Arbor, MI
March 1, 2017; 7:00 pm, BTN		at Northwestern	L 65–67	19–11 (9–8)	15 – Walton	10 – Wagner	6 – Walton	Welsh-Ryan Arena (8,117); Evanston, IL
March 5, 2017; 8:00 pm, BTN		at Nebraska	W 93–57	20–11 (10–8)	18 – Walton	3 – 4 tied	16 – Walton	Pinnacle Bank Arena; Lincoln, NE
Big Ten tournament
March 9, 2017; 12:00 pm, BTN	(8)	vs. (9) Illinois; Second Round	W 75–55	21–11	19 – Walton	7 – Irvin	5 – Walton	Verizon Center (12,189); Washington, D.C.
March 10, 2017; 12:00 pm, ESPN	(8)	vs. (1) No. 13 Purdue; Quarterfinals	W 74–70 ^{OT}	22–11	26 – Wilson	8 – Wilson	4 – Walton	Verizon Center (12,189); Washington, D.C.
March 11, 2017; 1:00 pm, CBS	(8)	vs. (4) Minnesota; Semifinals	W 84–77	23–11	29 – Walton	5 – 2 tied	9 – Walton	Verizon Center (13,984); Washington, D.C.
March 12, 2017; 3:00 pm, CBS	(8)	vs. (2) No. 24 Wisconsin; Championship	W 71–56	24–11	22 – Walton	7 – Irvin	7 – Walton	Verizon Center (12,902); Washington, D.C.
NCAA tournament
March 17, 2017; 12:15 pm, CBS	(7 MW) No. 23	vs. (10 MW) Oklahoma State; First Round	W 92–91	25–11	26 – Walton	5 – 2 tied	11 – Walton	Bankers Life Fieldhouse (18,255); Indianapolis, IN
March 19, 2017; 12:10 pm, CBS	(7 MW) No. 23	vs. (2 MW) No. 10 Louisville; Second Round	W 73–69	26–11	26 – Wagner	7 – Walton	6 – Walton	Bankers Life Fieldhouse (18,293); Indianapolis, IN
March 23, 2017; 7:09 pm, CBS	(7 MW) No. 23	vs. (3 MW) No. 9 Oregon; Sweet Sixteen	L 68–69	26–12	20 – Walton	8 – Irvin	8 – Walton	Sprint Center (18,475); Kansas City, MO
*Non-conference game. ^{#}Rankings from AP Poll. (#) Tournament seedings in parentheses. All times are in Eastern Time.

== Roster ==
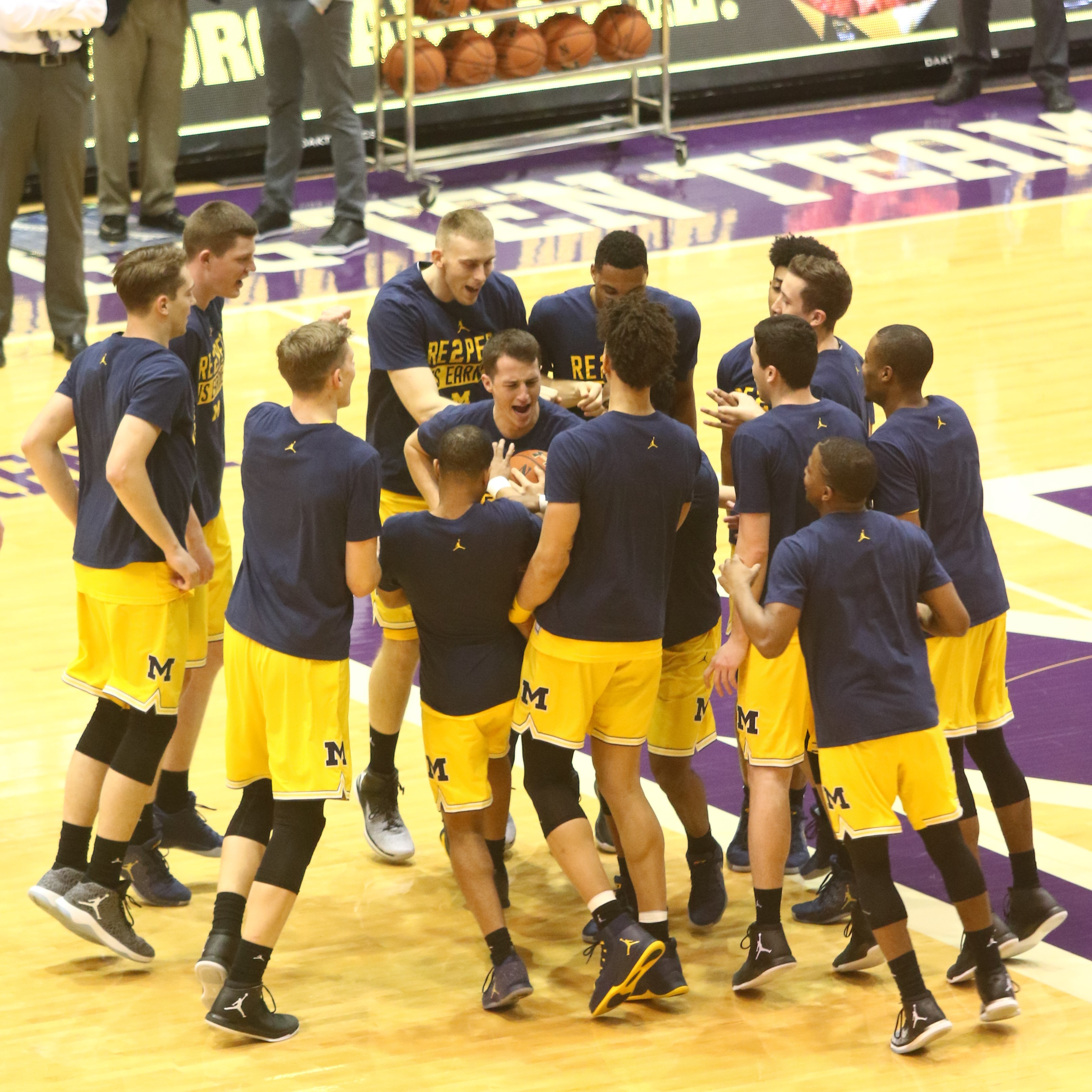
2016–17 Michigan Wolverines enjoy pregame comradery at Welsh-Ryan Arena

2016–17 Michigan Wolverines men's basketball team
Players
Coaches

Pos.	#	Name	Height	Weight	Year	Previous school	Hometown
F	0	Brent Hibbitts (W)	6 ft 8 in (2.03 m)	210 lb (95 kg)	RS Fr	Hudsonville High School	Hudsonville, Michigan
G	1	Charles Matthews (I) (redshirt)	6 ft 6 in (1.98 m)	190 lb (86 kg)	So	St. Rita of Cascia High School	Chicago, Illinois
G	3	Zavier Simpson	6 ft 0 in (1.83 m)	180 lb (82 kg)	Fr	Lima Senior High School	Lima, Ohio
F	5	D. J. Wilson	6 ft 10 in (2.08 m)	240 lb (109 kg)	RS So	Capital Christian School	Sacramento, California
G	10	Derrick Walton (C)	6 ft 1 in (1.85 m)	190 lb (86 kg)	Sr	Chandler Park Academy	Detroit, Michigan
G	11	Andrew Dakich	6 ft 2 in (1.88 m)	190 lb (86 kg)	Sr	Zionsville Community High School	Zionsville, Indiana
G	12	Muhammad-Ali Abdur-Rahkman	6 ft 4 in (1.93 m)	190 lb (86 kg)	Jr	Allentown Central Catholic High School	Allentown, Pennsylvania
F	13	Moritz Wagner	6 ft 11 in (2.11 m)	240 lb (109 kg)	So	Alba Berlin	Berlin, Germany
G	14	Fred Wright-Jones (W)	5 ft 11 in (1.8 m)	170 lb (77 kg)	So	East English Village Prep	Detroit, Michigan
C	15	Jon Teske	7 ft 0 in (2.13 m)	245 lb (111 kg)	Fr	Medina High School (OH)	Medina, Ohio
F	20	Sean Lonergan (W)	6 ft 5 in (1.96 m)	210 lb (95 kg)	RS Jr	Fishers High School	Fishers, Indiana
G/F	21	Zak Irvin (C)	6 ft 6 in (1.98 m)	215 lb (98 kg)	Sr	Hamilton Southeastern High School	Fishers, Indiana
G/F	22	Duncan Robinson	6 ft 8 in (2.03 m)	215 lb (98 kg)	Sr	Phillips Exeter Academy	New Castle, New Hampshire
G/F	23	Ibi Watson	6 ft 5 in (1.96 m)	190 lb (86 kg)	Fr	Pickerington High School Central	Pickerington, Ohio
F	34	Mark Donnal	6 ft 9 in (2.06 m)	240 lb (109 kg)	RS Jr	Anthony Wayne High School	Monclova, Ohio
F	51	Austin Davis	6 ft 10 in (2.08 m)	240 lb (109 kg)	Fr	Onsted High School	Onsted, Michigan

Head coach

- John Beilein (Wheeling)

Assistant coach(es)

- Jeff Meyer (Taylor)
- Billy Donlon (UNC Wilmington)
- Saddi Washington (Western Michigan)

Legend

- (C) Team captain
- (S) Suspended
- (I) Ineligible
- (W) Walk-on
- Injured
- Current redshirt

Roster

=== Coaching staff ===
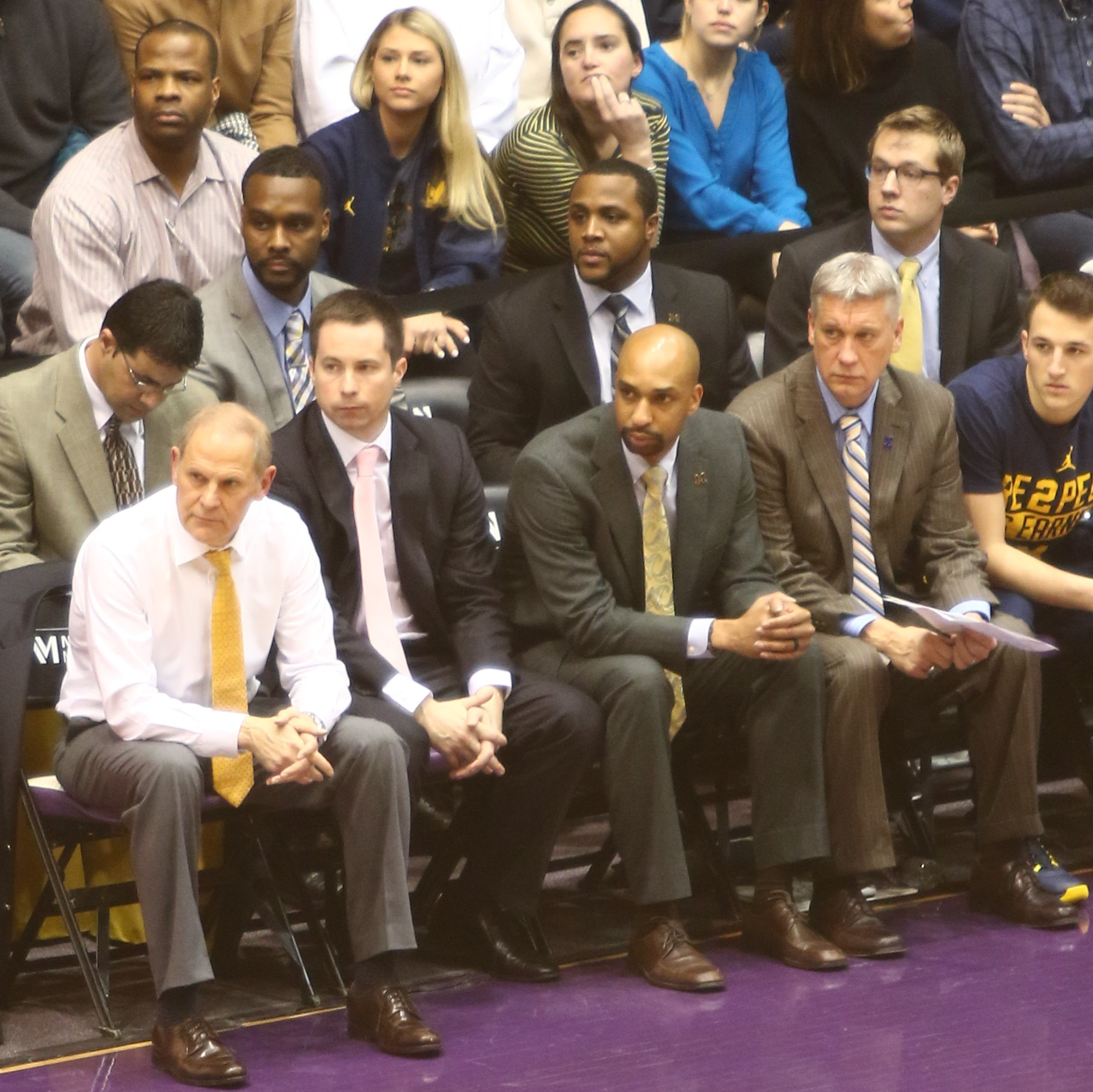
(first row: left to right) John Beilein, Billy Donlon, Saddi Washington and Jeff Meyer (second row: includes Chris Hunter 2nd from the left).

Name	Position	Year at Michigan	Alma Mater (year)
John Beilein	Head coach	10th	Wheeling Jesuit (1975)
Jeff Meyer	Assistant coach	9th	Taylor (1976)
Billy Donlon	Assistant coach	1st	UNC Wilmington (1999)
Saddi Washington	Assistant coach	1st	Western Michigan (1998)

Support Staff
Waleed Samaha – Director of Basketball Operations
Chris Hunter – Director of Player Personnel
Bryan Smothers – Video Analyst
Devon Mulry – Graduate Manager

== Rankings ==
Ranking movements Legend: ██ Increase in ranking ██ Decrease in ranking RV = Received votes т = Tied with team above or below
	Week																			
Poll	Pre	1	2	3	4	5	6	7	8	9	10	11	12	13	14	15	16	17	18	Final
AP	RV		25T	RV												RV	RV	RV	23	Not released
Coaches'	RV	RV	24	RV		RV											RV	RV	RV	17

== Statistics ==
The team posted the following statistics:

Name	GP	GS	Min.	Avg.	FG	FGA	FG%	3FG	3FGA	3FG%	FT	FTA	FT%	OR	DR	RB	Avg.	Ast.	Avg.	PF	DQ	TO	Stl.	Blk.	Pts.	Avg.
Derrick Walton Jr.	38	38	1323	34.8	171	392	0.436	98	232	0.422	149	170	0.876	17	165	182	4.8	189	5.0	65	1	66	43	1	589	15.5
Zak Irvin	38	38	1345	35.4	195	430	0.453	54	157	0.344	51	76	0.671	23	149	172	4.5	113	3.0	46	1	71	34	2	495	13.0
Moritz Wagner	38	38	908	23.9	168	300	0.560	45	114	0.395	77	106	0.726	51	107	158	4.2	20	0.5	102	4	54	39	14	458	12.1
D. J. Wilson	38	36	1155	30.4	164	305	0.538	41	110	0.373	50	60	0.833	57	146	203	5.3	50	1.3	72	2	42	19	57	419	11.0
M-A Abdur-Rahkman	38	37	1164	30.6	120	259	0.463	42	111	0.378	62	81	0.765	27	78	105	2.8	75	2.0	83	0	40	35	4	344	9.1
Duncan Robinson	38	3	764	20.1	101	215	0.470	64	151	0.424	25	32	0.781	11	55	66	1.7	33	0.9	70	2	19	15	9	291	7.7
Mark Donnal	38	0	464	12.2	50	81	0.617	9	18	0.500	39	50	0.780	35	41	76	2.0	4	0.1	57	0	15	9	12	148	3.9
Zavier Simpson	38	0	332	8.7	16	43	0.372	5	19	0.263	22	31	0.710	4	20	24	0.6	37	1.0	47	0	19	20	2	59	1.6
Ibi Watson	19	0	83	4.4	10	29	0.345	1	18	0.056	3	4	0.750	0	8	8	0.4	1	0.1	5	0	3	2	0	24	1.3
Sean Lonergan	17	0	36	2.1	4	9	0.444	0	2	0.000	3	6	0.500	1	6	7	0.4	3	0.2	11	0	2	0	1	11	0.6
Jon Teske	20	0	61	3.0	1	7	0.143	0	1	0.000	3	6	0.500	7	5	12	0.6	2	0.1	10	0	1	3	7	5	0.2
Fred Wright-Jones	13	0	18	1.4	1	4	0.250	1	2	0.500	2	2	1.000	0	1	1	0.1	0	0.0	2	0	1	0	0	5	0.4
Brent Hibbitts	10	0	22	2.2	1	2	0.500	1	2	0.500	0	0		2	2	4	0.4	2	0.2	2	0	2	0	0	3	0.3
TEAM	37													45	48	93	2.5			2		13				
Season Total	38				1002	2076	0.483	361	937	0.385	486	624	0.779	280	831	1111	29.2	529	13.9	574	10	348	219	109	2851	75.0
Opponents	38				958	2062	0.465	224	593	0.378	383	561	0.683	356	854	1210	31.8	439	11.6	650		478	162	95	2523	66.4

== Honors ==
2016–17 All Big Ten Conference team honorees

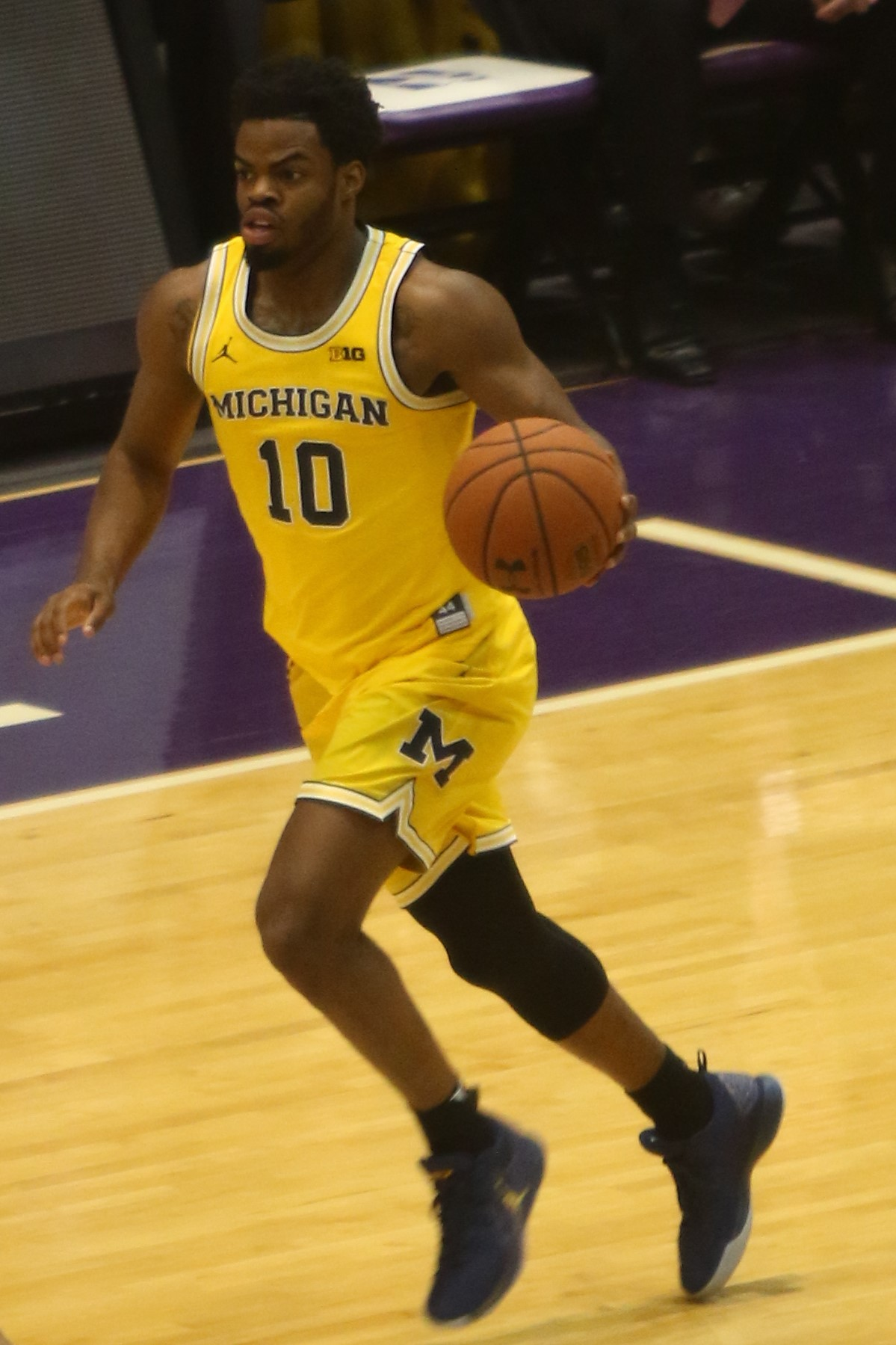
Derrick Walton, 2nd team

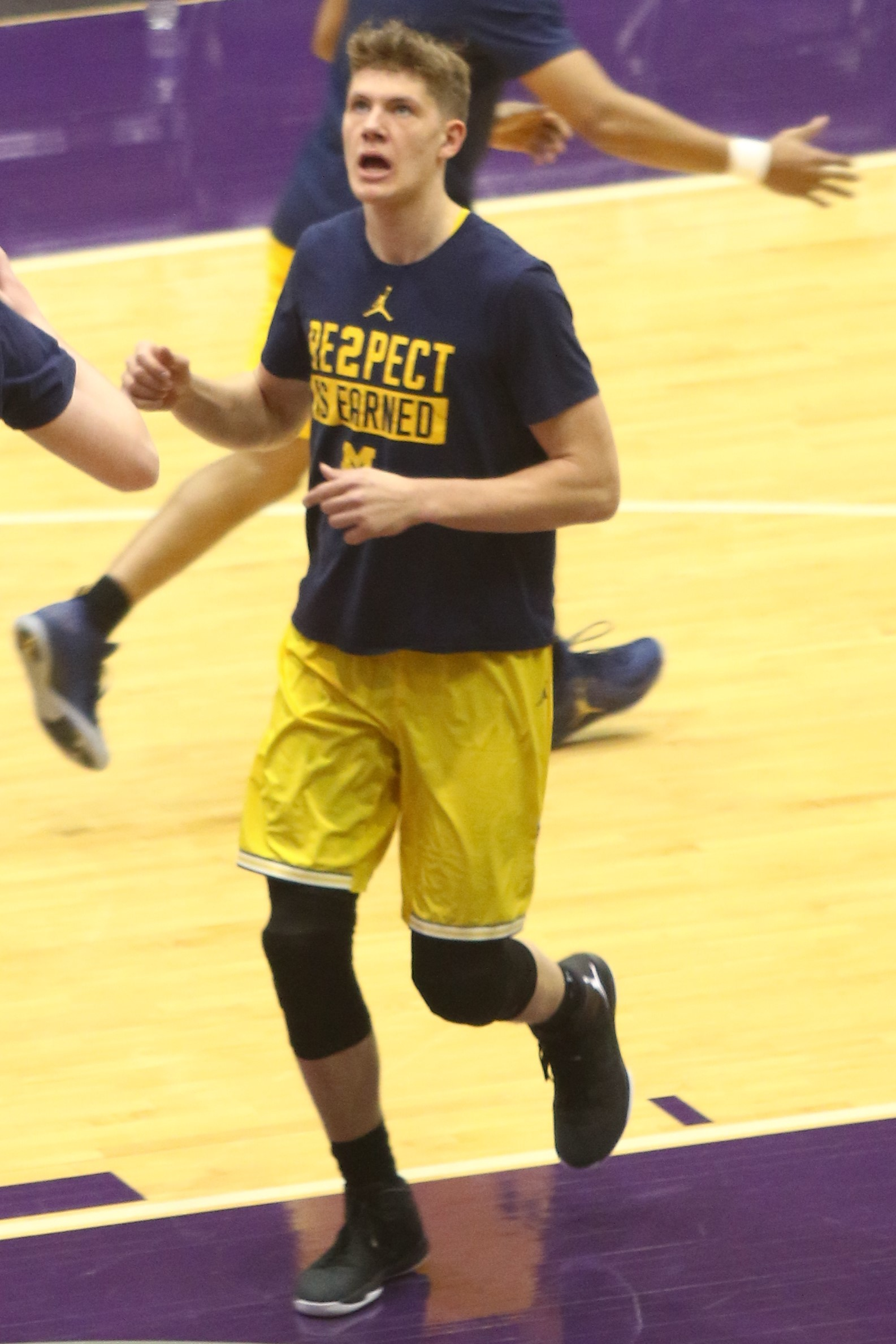
Moe Wagner, hon. mention

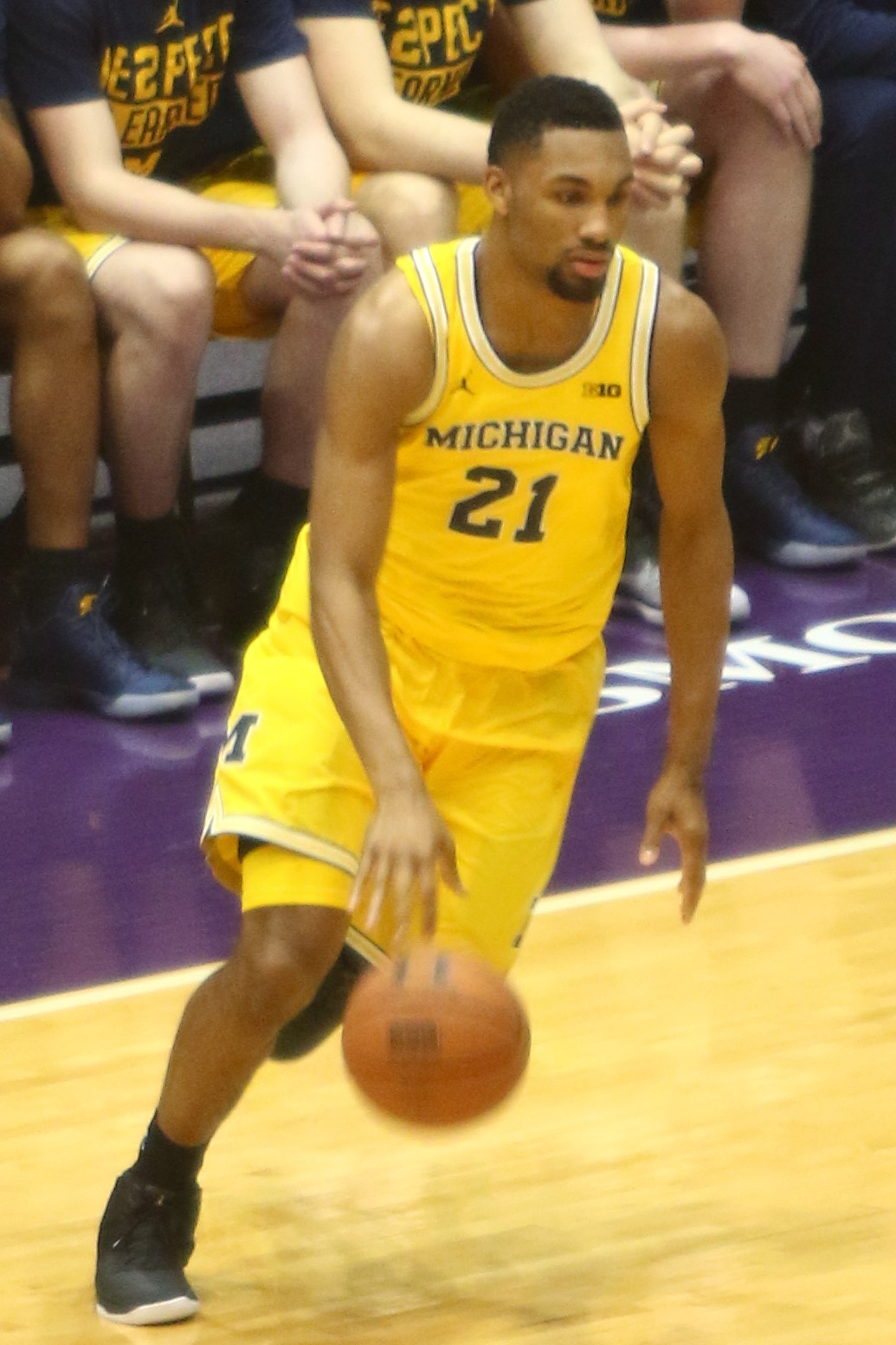
Zak Irvin, hon. mention

On December 5, 2016, Irvin was named as a nominee for the Allstate Good Works Team in honor of his volunteerism and civic involvement. On January 6, 2017, Walton was one of 5 Big Ten players included on the 30-man Senior CLASS Award candidate list. On January 9, the Wolverines promoted Andrew Dakich to full-scholarship status. Moritz Wagner was one of two Big Ten athletes (along with Caleb Swanigan named to the February 9, 2016–17 NCAA Division I Academic All-District Men's Basketball Team for District 5 (IL, IN, MI, OH), placing them among the 40 finalists for the Academic All-American 15-man team. Walton earned co-Big Ten Player of the week recognition with Jordan Murphy on February 13 and with Swanigan on March 6. Walton was recognized by both the coaches and the media as a second-team All-Big Ten selection, while Wagner was an honorable mention selection by both groups and Irvin was an honorable mention selection by the media. Walton was one of ten Big Ten players honored as All-District selections by the United States Basketball Writers Association. Walton was selected as Most Outstanding Player of the 2017 Big Ten Conference men's basketball tournament and was joined on the All-tournament team by Irvin. Walton was included on the National Association of Basketball Coaches Division I All-District 7 second-team on March 22.

Irvin (35.4) and Walton (34.8) finished first and second in minutes played in the Big Ten for the season. Walton also finished second in free throw percentage (87.6%) and assists/turnover ration (2.9). Irvin finished his career tied for first in career games played in school history (142), third in career three-point shots made (241) and fourth in career minutes played (4,225). Walton finished his career second in career free throw percentage (83.67%), third in career games started (126) fourth in career assists (499) and fourth in career three-point field goals made (233). Following the season, Walton was named team MVP.

The 2013–14 team had set a Big Ten free throw percentage record by shooting 76.2% for the season. The 2016–17 Michigan Wolverines eclipsed that record by shooting 77.9%. Michigan also led the Big Ten in field goal percentage 48.3%, +3.4 turnover margin per game, 1.5 assist/turnover ratio and 9.5 three-point field goals made per game. Their 9.4 turnovers per game led the nation going into the NCAA Tournament.

=== Team players drafted into the NBA ===
Wilson became the eighth NBA draft selection during the John Beilein era when the Milwaukee Bucks made him the 17th selection. He was the first of four 2016–17 Big Ten Conference players selected in the 2017 NBA draft.

Year	Round	Pick	Overall	Player	NBA Club
2017	1	17	17	D. J. Wilson	Milwaukee Bucks
2018	1	25	25	Moritz Wagner	Los Angeles Lakers

== Postseason ==
Following the season on March 28, both Andrew Dakich and Mark Donnal announced that they would graduate and transfer to other programs as 5th-year graduate transfers. On April 10, both D. J. Wilson and Moe Wagner declared for the 2017 NBA draft, but did not hire agents, which gave them until May 24 to withdraw their names and retain their athletic eligibility to return to Michigan. 57 of the 78 players who declared for the 2016 NBA draft without hiring an agent withdrew their names. On May 1, Donnal announced that he would use his final year of eligibility to play with the 2017–18 Clemson Tigers. On May 24, Wagner withdrew his name from the NBA draft and Wilson did not.
