= Ibi Watson =

American basketball player (born 1998)

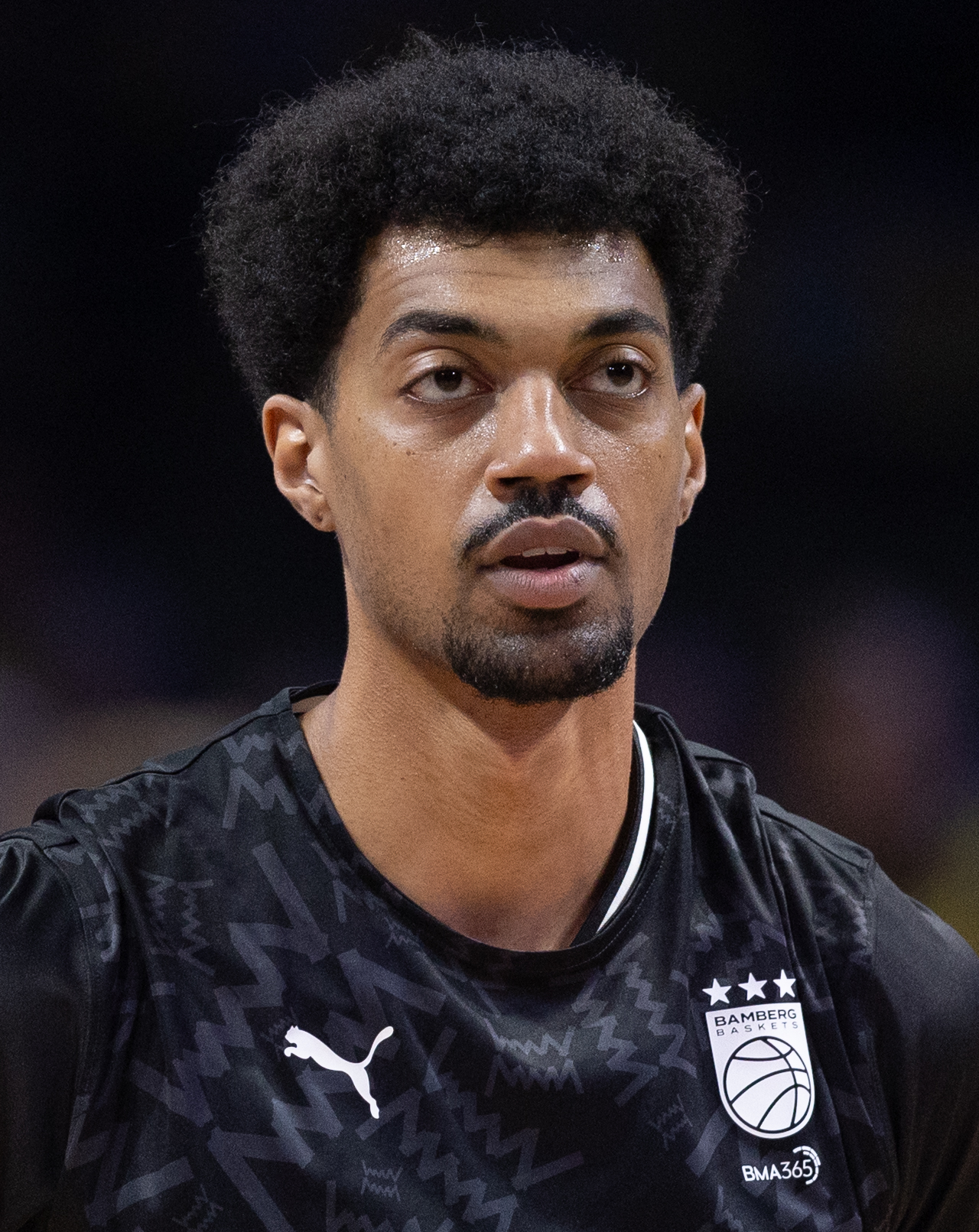
- Watson with Bamberg in 2026

No. 2 – Ratiopharm Ulm
- Position: Shooting guard
- League: Basketball Bundesliga; EuroCup

Personal information
- Born: January 6, 1998 (age 28) Atlanta, Georgia
- Listed height: 6 ft 5 in (1.96 m)
- Listed weight: 195 lb (88 kg)

Career information
- High school: Athens (The Plains, Ohio); Pickerington Central (Pickerington, Ohio)
- College: Michigan (2016–2018); Dayton (2019–2021)
- NBA draft: 2021: undrafted
- Playing career: 2021–present

Career history
- 2021–2022: College Park Skyhawks
- 2023–2024: Borås Basket
- 2024: Ottawa BlackJacks
- 2024–2026: Bamberg Baskets
- 2026–present: Ratiopharm Ulm

Career highlights
- Third-team All-Atlantic 10 (2021)
- Stats at NBA.com
- Stats at Basketball Reference

Ibrahim Davis Watson-Boye (born January 6, 1998) is an American professional basketball player for Ratiopharm Ulm of the Basketball Bundesliga (BBL) and the EuroCup. He played college basketball for the Dayton Flyers and Michigan Wolverines.

== High school career ==
During his first two years of high school, Watson attended Athens High School in The Plains, Ohio. He was a basketball teammate of Joe Burrow. For his junior season, Watson transferred to Pickerington High School Central in Pickerington, Ohio. He averaged 19.2 points through two years at the school and earned First Team Division I All-Ohio honors as a senior. He initially committed to playing college basketball for Michigan over offers from Dayton and Indiana, among others.

== College career ==
As a freshman at Michigan, Watson served as a reserve and received limited minutes. He averaged 2.2 points in 5.2 minutes per game as a sophomore, helping his team to the 2018 National Championship Game. After the season, Watson transferred to the University of Dayton and found a great home. Watson sat out his next year due to transfer rules. During the 2019–2020 season, Watson served as the sixth man and averaged 10.1 points per game and shot nearly 40% from three-point range. On December 23, 2019, he scored a career-high 30 points in an 81–53 win over Grambling State. As a junior, he was a critical piece in helping Dayton achieve a Top 3 NCAA ranking, and a program-record 29 wins.

As a senior, Watson was named to the Third Team All-Atlantic 10. He finished 10th in the conference in scoring (15.8) and third in three-point field-goal percentage and three-pointers made (.427, 61–143).

== Professional career ==
After going undrafted in the 2021 NBA draft, Watson joined the Atlanta Hawks for the 2021 NBA Summer League, posting 8 points in 20 minutes on 3–7 shooting at his debut, a 85–83 loss against the Boston Celtics. On October 12, he signed a contract with the Hawks, but was waived three days later. In October 2021, Watson signed with the College Park Skyhawks. On December 10, 2022, he was waived by College Park.

On August 1, 2023, Watson signed with Borås Basket of the Swedish Basketball League.

In June 2024 he signed with Bamberg Baskets of the German Basketball Bundesliga.

On June 13, 2026, he signed with Ratiopharm Ulm of the Basketball Bundesliga (BBL).

== Career statistics ==
Legend
| GP | Games played | GS | Games started | MPG | Minutes per game |
| FG% | Field goal percentage | 3P% | 3-point field goal percentage | FT% | Free throw percentage |
| RPG | Rebounds per game | APG | Assists per game | SPG | Steals per game |
| BPG | Blocks per game | PPG | Points per game | **Bold** | Career high |

=== College ===
| Year | Team | GP | GS | MPG | FG% | 3P% | FT% | RPG | APG | SPG | BPG | PPG |
|---|---|---|---|---|---|---|---|---|---|---|---|---|
| 2016–17 | Michigan | 19 | **1** | 4.4 | .345 | .056 | .750 | .4 | .1 | .1 | .0 | 1.3 |
| 2017–18 | Michigan | 26 | 0 | 5.2 | .389 | .323 | .545 | .8 | .3 | .3 | .0 | 2.2 |
| 2018–19 | Dayton | Redshirt | | | | | | | | | | |
| 2019–20 | Dayton | **31** | 1 | 22.5 | **.498** | .393 | **.845** | 2.4 | 1.3 | .2 | **.3** | 10.1 |
| 2020–21 | Dayton | 24 | **24** | **37.1** | .467 | **.416** | .757 | **4.1** | **1.9** | **.5** | **.3** | **15.7** |
| Career | | 100 | 26 | 18.1 | .465 | .378 | .776 | 2.0 | 1.0 | .3 | .2 | 7.7 |
