= 2016–17 Nebraska Cornhuskers men's basketball team =

American college basketball season

2016–17 Nebraska Cornhuskers men's basketball
- Conference: Big Ten Conference
- Record: 12–19 (6–12 Big Ten)
- Head coach: Tim Miles (5th season)
- Assistant coaches: Kenya Hunter; Michael Lewis; Jim Molinari
- Home arena: Pinnacle Bank Arena

2016–17 Big Ten Conference men's basketball standings
	Conf.				Overall
Team	W		L	PCT	W		L	PCT
No. 15 Purdue	14	–	4	.778	27	–	8	.771
No. 25 Wisconsin	12	–	6	.667	27	–	10	.730
Maryland	12	–	6	.667	24	–	9	.727
Minnesota	11	–	7	.611	24	–	10	.706
No. 23 Michigan †	10	–	8	.556	26	–	12	.684
Northwestern	10	–	8	.556	24	–	12	.667
Michigan State	10	–	8	.556	20	–	15	.571
Iowa	10	–	8	.556	19	–	15	.559
Illinois	8	–	10	.444	20	–	15	.571
Ohio State	7	–	11	.389	17	–	15	.531
Indiana	7	–	11	.389	18	–	16	.529
Penn State	6	–	12	.333	15	–	18	.455
Nebraska	6	–	12	.333	12	–	19	.387
Rutgers	3	–	15	.167	15	–	18	.455
† 2017 Big Ten tournament winner Rankings from AP poll

The 2016–17 Nebraska Cornhuskers men's basketball team represented the University of Nebraska–Lincoln in the 2016–17 NCAA Division I men's basketball season. The Cornhuskers, led by fifth-year coach head coach Tim Miles, played their home games at Pinnacle Bank Arena in Lincoln, Nebraska and were members of the Big Ten Conference. They finished the season 12–19, 6–12 in Big Ten play to finish in a tie for 12th place. As the No. 12 seed in the Big Ten tournament, they lost in the first round to Penn State.

Following the season, Nebraska athletic director Shawn Eichorst indicated that Tim Miles would return as head coach for Nebraska.

== Previous season ==
The Cornhuskers finished the 2015–16 season 16–18, 6–12 in Big Ten play to finish in 11th place in conference. In the Big Ten tournament, they defeated Rutgers and Wisconsin to advance to the quarterfinals where they lost to Maryland.

== Departures ==
Name	Number	Pos.	Height	Weight	Year	Hometown	Notes
Andrew White III	3	G	6'7"	220	RS Junior	Richmond, VA	Graduate transferred to Syracuse
Johnny Trueblood	4	G	6'4"	195	Freshman	Elkhorn, NE	Walk-on; left team.
Bakari Evelyn	11	G	6'2"	175	Freshman	Detroit, MI	Transferred to Valparaiso
Tanner Borchardt	20, 41	F	6'8"	275	Freshman	Gothenburg, NE	Walk-on; left the team for personal reasons. Returned to team on Feb. 2, 2017.
Jacob Hammond	24	C	6'10"	230	Junior	Duncan, OK	Transferred to Central Oklahoma
Shavon Shields	31	G	6'6"	221	Senior	Olathe, KS	Graduated
Benny Parker	32	G	5'9"	172	Senior	Kansas City, KS	Graduated

=== Incoming transfers ===
Name	Number	Pos.	Height	Weight	Year	Hometown	Notes
James Palmer Jr.	24	G	6'5"	202	Junior	Washington, D.C.	Transferred from Miami (FL). Under NCAA transfer rules, Palmer will have to sit out for the 2016–17 season. Will have two years of remaining eligibility.
Evan Taylor	11	G	6'5"	223	Junior	Cincinnati, Ohio	JUCO transfer from Odessa College. Prior to Odessa, Taylor played at Samford. Under NCAA transfer rules, Taylor will be able to play immediately.
Isaac Copeland	14	F	6'9"	220	Junior	Raleigh, North Carolina	Transferred mid-season from Georgetown. Underwent surgery, has been granted a medical redshirt, and has applied for a medical hardship waiver. Under NCAA transfer rules, if the waiver is granted, Copeland will be able to play immediately next season with two full years of remaining eligibility. If the waiver is denied, Copeland will be eligible for play in January 2018 and will have 1.5 years of remaining eligibility.

== 2016 Signing class ==
College recruiting information
Name	Hometown	School	Height	Weight	Commit date
Jordy Tshimanga #25 C	Montreal, QE	The MacDuffie School	6 ft 10 in (2.08 m)	230 lb (100 kg)	May 16, 2016
Jordy Tshimanga #25 C	Recruit ratings: Scout: Rivals: 247Sports: (79)				
Isaiah Roby #33 SF	Dixon, IL	Dixon HS	6 ft 8 in (2.03 m)	205 lb (93 kg)	Oct 21, 2014
Isaiah Roby #33 SF	Recruit ratings: Scout: Rivals: 247Sports: (78)				
Jeriah Horne; SF	Kansas City, MO	The Barstow School	6 ft 7 in (2.01 m)	220 lb (100 kg)	Oct 1, 2015
Jeriah Horne; SF	Recruit ratings: Scout: Rivals: 247Sports: (NR)				
Overall recruit ranking: 247Sports: 53
Note: In many cases, Scout, Rivals, 247Sports, On3, and ESPN may conflict in their listings of height and weight.; In these cases, the average was taken. ESPN grades are on a 100-point scale.; Sources: "2016 Team Ranking". Rivals.

=== 2017 Recruiting Class ===
College recruiting information (2017)
Name	Hometown	School	Height	Weight	Commit date
Nana Akenten; SG	Bolingbrook, IL	Bolingbrook HS	6 ft 6 in (1.98 m)	195 lb (88 kg)	Sep 15, 2016
Nana Akenten; SG	Recruit ratings: Scout: Rivals: 247Sports: ESPN:				
Thomas Allen; SG	Garner, NC	Brewster Academy	6 ft 1 in (1.85 m)	155 lb (70 kg)	Apr 21, 2017
Thomas Allen; SG	Recruit ratings: Scout: Rivals: 247Sports: ESPN: (83)				
Justin Costello; SG, PG (Walk-on)	Elkhorn, NE	Elkhorn South HS	6 ft 2 in (1.88 m)	180 lb (82 kg)	Feb 7, 2017
Justin Costello; SG, PG (Walk-on)	Recruit ratings: Scout: Rivals: 247Sports: ESPN:				
Overall recruit ranking:
Note: In many cases, Scout, Rivals, 247Sports, On3, and ESPN may conflict in their listings of height and weight.; In these cases, the average was taken. ESPN grades are on a 100-point scale.; Sources: "2017 Team Ranking". Rivals.

== Roster ==
2016–17 Nebraska Cornhuskers men's basketball team
Players
Coaches

Pos.	#	Name	Height	Weight	Year	Previous school	Hometown
G	0	Tai Webster	6 ft 4 in (1.93 m)	195 lb (88 kg)	Sr	Westlake Boys High School	Auckland, New Zealand
G	1	Anton Gill (injured)	6 ft 3 in (1.91 m)	195 lb (88 kg)	RS Jr	Louisville	Raleigh, North Carolina
F	2	Jeriah Horne	6 ft 7 in (2.01 m)	222 lb (101 kg)	Fr	The Barstow School	Overland Park, Kansas
G	3	Jason Shultis (W)	6 ft 1 in (1.85 m)	198 lb (90 kg)	So	Northwest High School	Dannebrog, Nebraska
G	5	Glynn Watson Jr.	6 ft 0 in (1.83 m)	174 lb (79 kg)	So	St. Joseph High School	Bellwood, Illinois
F	10	Jack McVeigh	6 ft 8 in (2.03 m)	215 lb (98 kg)	So	Australian Institute of Sport	Cabarita Beach, NSW, Australia
G	11	Evan Taylor	6 ft 5 in (1.96 m)	206 lb (93 kg)	Jr	Odessa College	Cincinnati, Ohio
F	12	Michael Jacobson	6 ft 9 in (2.06 m)	239 lb (108 kg)	So	Waukee High School	Waukee, Iowa
G	13	Malcolm Laws (W)	6 ft 1 in (1.85 m)	190 lb (86 kg)	Jr	Florida Atlantic	Orlando, Florida
F	14	Isaac Copeland (injured) (I) (redshirt)	6 ft 9 in (2.06 m)	220 lb (100 kg)	Jr	Georgetown	Raleigh, North Carolina
F	15	Isaiah Roby	6 ft 8 in (2.03 m)	214 lb (97 kg)	Fr	Dixon High School	Dixon, Illinois
G	21	Mohammad Elradi (W)	6 ft 3 in (1.91 m)	185 lb (84 kg)	RS Fr	Mount Michael High School	Omaha, Nebraska
F	23	Nick Fuller	6 ft 7 in (2.01 m)	213 lb (97 kg)	RS Jr	Sun Prairie High School	Sun Prairie, Wisconsin
G	24	James Palmer Jr. (I) (redshirt)	6 ft 6 in (1.98 m)	213 lb (97 kg)	RS Jr	Miami (FL)	Upper Marlboro, Maryland
F	30	Ed Morrow	6 ft 7 in (2.01 m)	234 lb (106 kg)	So	Simeon Academy	Chicago, Illinois
C	32	Jordy Tshimanga	6 ft 11 in (2.11 m)	275 lb (125 kg)	Fr	The MacDuffie School	Montreal, Quebec, Canada
F	41	Tanner Borchardt (W)	6 ft 8 in (2.03 m)	275 lb (125 kg)	So	Gothenburg High School	Gothenburg, Nebraska

Head coach

- Tim Miles (Mary)

Assistant coach(es)

- Kenya Hunter (Duquesne)
- Michael Lewis (Indiana)
- Jim Molinari (Illinois Wesleyan)

Legend

- (C) Team captain
- (S) Suspended
- (I) Ineligible
- (W) Walk-on
- Injured
- Current redshirt

Roster

== Schedule and results ==
Date time, TV	Rank^{#}	Opponent^{#}	Result	Record	High points	High rebounds	High assists	Site (attendance) city, state
Exhibition
Nov 7, 2016*; 7:00 pm, BTN+		Chadron State	W 98–45		16 – Roby	6 – Tshimanga, Watson	6 – Watson	Pinnacle Bank Arena (15,781); Lincoln, NE
Non-conference Regular Season
Nov 13, 2016*; 7:00 pm, BTN		Sacramento State	W 83–61	1–0	23 – Watson	7 – McVeigh	6 – Watson	Pinnacle Bank Arena (15,883); Lincoln, NE
Nov 15, 2016*; 7:00 pm, BTN+		Mary	W 70–38	2–0	10 – Jacobson, Webster	8 – Tshimanga	4 – McVeigh, Watson	Pinnacle Bank Arena (15,738); Lincoln, NE
Nov 19, 2016*; 7:00 pm, ESPN3		Louisiana Tech	W 65–54	3–0	23 – Webster	5 – Jacobson, McVeigh	4 – Webster	Pinnacle Bank Arena (15,824); Lincoln, NE
Nov 24, 2016*; 7:30 pm, ESPNU		vs. Dayton; DirecTV Wooden Legacy quarterfinals	W 80–78	4–0	20 – Watson	10 – Morrow	3 – 3 tied	Titan Gym (3,816); Fullerton, CA
Nov 25, 2016*; 11:00 pm, ESPN2		vs. No. 14 UCLA; DirecTV Wooden Legacy semifinals	L 71–82	4–1	27 – Watson	7 – Morrow, Webster	7 – Webster	Titan Gym (5,153); Fullerton, CA
Nov 27, 2016*; 3:00 pm, ESPNU		vs. Virginia Tech; DirecTV Wooden Legacy 3rd place game	L 53–66	4–2	23 – Webster	6 – Webster	3 – Watson	Honda Center (4,221); Anaheim, CA
Nov 30, 2016*; 8:00 pm, ESPNU		at Clemson; ACC–Big Ten Challenge	L 58–60	4–3	20 – Watson	12 – Morrow	4 – Watson	Littlejohn Coliseum (6,545); Clemson, SC
Dec 3, 2016*; 1:00 pm, BTN+		South Dakota	W 73–61	5–3	16 – McVeigh	10 – Jacobson	9 – Webster	Pinnacle Bank Arena (15,642); Lincoln, NE
Dec 7, 2016*; 8:00 pm, BTN		No. 10 Creighton; Rivalry	L 62–77	5–4	20 – Webster	13 – Morrow	4 – Webster	Pinnacle Bank Arena (15,902); Lincoln, NE
Dec 10, 2016*; 2:15 pm, ESPN		at No. 3 Kansas	L 72–89	5–5	22 – Webster	8 – Tshimanga	5 – Webster	Allen Fieldhouse (16,300); Lawrence, KS
Dec 18, 2016*; 1:00 pm, ESPNU		Gardner–Webb	L 62–70	5–6	17 – Webster	18 – Morrow	4 – Webster	Pinnacle Bank Arena (14,333); Lincoln, NE
Dec 20, 2016*; 7:00 pm, BTN+		Southern	W 81–76	6–6	18 – Horne	5 – 3 tied	5 – Webster	Pinnacle Bank Arena (13,960); Lincoln, NE
Big Ten regular season
Dec 28, 2016; 5:30 pm, BTN		at No. 16 Indiana	W 87–83	7–6 (1–0)	26 – Watson	10 – Morrow	4 – Watson	Assembly Hall (16,168); Bloomington, IN
Jan 1, 2017; 11:00 pm, BTN		at Maryland	W 67–65	8–6 (2–0)	18 – Webster	9 – Jacobson	5 – Webster	Xfinity Center (15,067); College Park, MD
Jan 5, 2017; 8:00 pm, BTN		Iowa	W 93–90 ^{2OT}	9–6 (3–0)	34 – Watson	13 – Jacobson	7 – Webster	Pinnacle Bank Arena (14,939); Lincoln, NE
Jan 8, 2017; 1:15 pm, BTN		Northwestern	L 66–74	9–7 (3–1)	17 – Webster	10 – Jacobson	4 – Taylor	Pinnacle Bank Arena (15,053); Lincoln, NE
Jan 14, 2017; 1:00 pm, BTN		at Michigan	L 85–91	9–8 (3–2)	28 – Webster	9 – Webster	4 – Webster	Crisler Center (11,145); Ann Arbor, MI
Jan 18, 2017; 8:00 pm, BTN		Ohio State	L 66–67	9–9 (3–3)	18 – Webster	8 – Roby, Taylor	3 – Watson, Webster	Pinnacle Bank Arena (15,635); Lincoln, NE
Jan 21, 2017; 11:00 am, ESPNU		at Rutgers	L 64–65	9–10 (3–4)	14 – Webster	6 – Jacobson, Taylor	4 – Jacobson	Louis Brown Athletic Center (6,294); Piscataway, NJ
Jan 26, 2017; 7:00 pm, BTN		at Northwestern	L 61–73	9–11 (3–5)	23 – Webster	9 – Jacobson	5 – Watson	Welsh-Ryan Arena (7,108); Evanston, IL
Jan 29, 2017; 3:30 pm, BTN		No. 20 Purdue	W 83–80	10–11 (4–5)	21 – McVeigh	8 – Webster	6 – Webster	Pinnacle Bank Arena (15,715); Lincoln, NE
Feb 2, 2017; 6:00 pm, ESPN		Michigan State	L 61–72	10–12 (4–6)	18 – Webster	9 – Tshimanga	5 – Webster	Pinnacle Bank Arena (15,821); Lincoln, NE
Feb 5, 2017; 1:00 pm, BTN		at Iowa	L 70–81	10–13 (4–7)	16 – McVeigh	8 – Tshimanga	6 – Webster	Carver–Hawkeye Arena (13,495); Iowa City, IA
Feb 9, 2017; 8:00 pm, BTN		No. 7 Wisconsin	L 69–70 ^{OT}	10–14 (4–8)	19 – Webster	13 – Morrow	5 – Webster	Pinnacle Bank Arena (15,772); Lincoln, NE
Feb 14, 2017; 8:00 pm, BTN		Penn State	W 82–66	11–14 (5–8)	15 – McVeigh, Watson	7 – Tshimanga	6 – Webster	Pinnacle Bank Arena (15,642); Lincoln, NE
Feb 18, 2017; 5:00 pm, BTN		at Ohio State	W 58–57	12–14 (6–8)	17 – Webster	6 – Jacobson, Morrow	3 – Webster	Value City Arena (13,044); Columbus, OH
Feb 23, 2017; 6:00 pm, ESPNU		at Michigan State	L 72–88	12–15 (6–9)	19 – Webster	10 – Webster	3 – 3 Tied	Breslin Center (14,797); East Lansing, MI
Feb 26, 2017; 6:30 pm, BTN		Illinois	L 57–73	12–16 (6–10)	17 – Webster	8 – Webster	5 – Webster	Pinnacle Bank Arena (14,236); Lincoln, NE
Mar 2, 2017; 6:00 pm, ESPN		at Minnesota	L 73–88	12–17 (6–11)	14 – Watson	8 – Webster	3 – Watson	Williams Arena (14,625); Minneapolis, MN
Mar 5, 2017; 7:00 pm, BTN		Michigan	L 57–93	12–18 (6–12)	10 – Morrow, Roby	4 – Morrow, Tshimanga	5 – Webster	Pinnacle Bank Arena (15,293); Lincoln, NE
Big Ten tournament
Mar 8, 2017; 3:30 pm, ESPN2	(12)	vs. (13) Penn State; First round	L 67–76 ^{OT}	12–19	15 – Taylor	11 – Morrow	3 – Watson, Webster	Verizon Center (N/A); Washington, D.C.
*Non-conference game. ^{#}Rankings from AP Poll. (#) Tournament seedings in parentheses. All times are in Central Time.

== Rankings ==
Ranking movements Legend: ██ Increase in ranking ██ Decrease in ranking — = Not ranked RV = Received votes
	Week																			
Poll	Pre	1	2	3	4	5	6	7	8	9	10	11	12	13	14	15	16	17	18	Final
AP	—	—	—	—	—	—	—	—	—	—	—	—	—	—	—	—				Not released
Coaches	—	—	—	—	—	—	—	—	RV	—	—	—	—	—	—	—				

*AP does not release post-NCAA tournament rankings
