= Josh Hart =

American basketball player (born 1995)

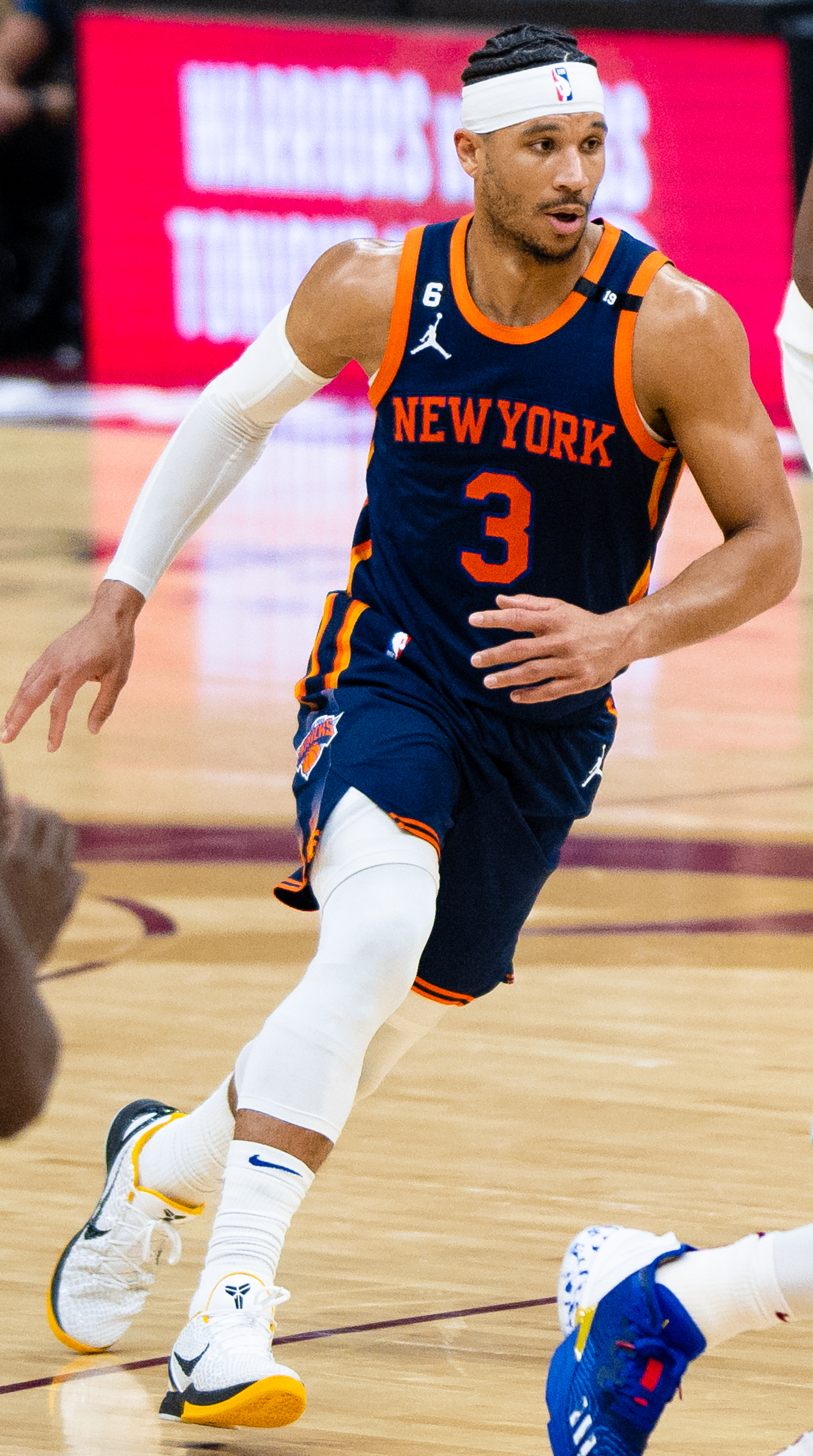
- Hart with the New York Knicks in 2023

No. 3 – New York Knicks
- Position: Shooting guard / small forward
- League: NBA

Personal information
- Born: March 6, 1995 (age 31) Silver Spring, Maryland, U.S.
- Listed height: 6 ft 5 in (1.96 m)
- Listed weight: 215 lb (98 kg)

Career information
- High school: Wheaton (Silver Spring, Maryland); Sidwell Friends School (Washington, D.C.)
- College: Villanova (2013–2017)
- NBA draft: 2017: 1st round, 30th overall pick
- Drafted by: Utah Jazz
- Playing career: 2017–present

Career history
- 2017–2019: Los Angeles Lakers
- 2017–2018: →South Bay Lakers
- 2019–2022: New Orleans Pelicans
- 2022–2023: Portland Trail Blazers
- 2023–present: New York Knicks

Career highlights
- NBA champion (2026); NBA Cup champion (2025); NCAA champion (2016); Consensus first-team All-American (2017); Third-team All-American – NABC (2016); Senior CLASS Award (2017); Julius Erving Award (2017); Big East Player of the Year (2017); Big East co-Defensive Player of the Year (2017); 2× First-team All-Big East (2016, 2017); Big East Sixth Man of the Year (2015); Big East All-Freshman Team (2014); 2× Big East tournament MOP (2015, 2017); Robert V. Geasey Trophy (2017); No. 3 retired by Villanova Wildcats
- Stats at NBA.com
- Stats at Basketball Reference

Joshua Aaron Hart (born March 6, 1995) is an American professional basketball player for the New York Knicks of the National Basketball Association (NBA). Across both his college and professional careers, he has logged minutes at shooting guard and both forward positions and is known for his hustle plays and rebounding ability. He holds the Knicks franchise record for the most triple-doubles in a single season.

Hart played college basketball for Villanova. As a sophomore, Hart was named the Big East tournament most outstanding player. He was named a third-team All-American as a junior, when he helped lead the Wildcats to a national championship in 2016. As a senior in 2017, he was a consensus first-team All-American. Selected in the first round of the 2017 NBA draft, Hart played his first two NBA seasons for the Los Angeles Lakers before being traded to the New Orleans Pelicans in 2019 as part of a package for Anthony Davis. Hart played three seasons with the Pelicans and was then traded to the Portland Trail Blazers in 2022 in a package for CJ McCollum. He was dealt to the New York Knicks at the 2023 trade deadline. Hart and the Knicks won the 2026 NBA Finals, securing New York's first championship in 53 years.

== Early life ==
Hart was born on March 6, 1995, in Silver Spring, Maryland, to Moses and Pat Hart. He has two siblings. Hart attended Loiederman Middle School, in Silver Spring, Maryland. Growing up, Hart gravitated toward basketball, earning a reputation as a high-energy player. While he excelled in basketball from a young age, Hart didn't get any interest from private schools, and enrolled at Wheaton High School. He briefly attended Wheaton before transferring to Sidwell Friends School, where as a junior he averaged 20.6 points and 11.6 rebounds per game. However, he was nearly kicked out of school due to poor grades until several students and parents petitioned the school to give him a second chance. As a senior, Hart averaged 24.3 points, 13.4 rebounds and 2.8 steals per game in leading the team to a 22–9 record. He was a first-team All-Met selection by The Washington Post and Rivals.com's 82nd-ranked prospect in the class of 2013.

After considering Rutgers and Penn State, Hart signed a letter of intent with Villanova in November 2012. "It's about doing the things that the coaches want me to do," he said after committing. "I might not hit the winning three but I'm going to be the one that goes and gets a rebound when we need it and goes on the floor for a loose ball, anything to win."

He got to know future Villanova teammate Kris Jenkins while playing AAU basketball in the Washington area.

Hart reached the level of Eagle Scout in 2013 in the Boy Scouts of America.

== College career ==
=== Freshman ===
A 2013–14 Big East All-Rookie Team selection, Hart averaged 7.8 points and 4.0 rebounds per contest as a freshman at Villanova. He was named Big East Rookie of the Week three times. He did not shoot the ball particularly well, making 31 percent of his three-point tries, but possessed "amazing confidence," according to assistant coach Baker Dunleavy. In the second game of his collegiate career, a 90–59 win over Mount St. Mary's, Hart posted a double-double of 17 points and 11 rebounds. He scored a season-high 19 points in an 88–67 win over Rider on December 21, 2013. Hart had 18 points and eight rebounds in a loss to Seton Hall in the Big East tournament quarterfinals.

=== Sophomore ===
Hart and teammate Darrun Hilliard both scored 20 points in an 85–62 rout of Temple on December 14, 2014. Hart scored 21 points in a December 20 game against Syracuse. The Wildcats never led in regulation and were down by 14 points in the second half, but managed to pull out an 82–77 overtime win. On February 28, 2015, in the second half of a game against Xavier, Hart was hit in the mouth during a scramble for the ball, requiring stitches on his lip.

As a sophomore, Hart was named the Big East's Sixth Man of the Year in 2015 at the conclusion of the regular season. "He's the perfect sixth man because he can come in and play any position except probably point guard," head coach Jay Wright said. Hart was the most outstanding player of the 2015 Big East tournament, the first bench player to receive the honor. He was the tournament's leading scorer at 17.7 points per game, including a 20-point performance in an 84–49 quarterfinals victory over Marquette. He improved his three-point shooting to 47.3 percent, forcing opposing teams to guard him more on the perimeter. He improved his season averages to 10.1 points and 4.5 rebounds per game.

=== Junior ===
Hart's 2015–16 Wildcats were the unanimous coaches preseason selection to win the conference. In the NIT season tip-off, Hart scored a career-high 27 points to help Villanova defeat Akron by a score of 75–56. On January 2, 2016, Hart scored 25 points in a win over Creighton. Hart led the Wildcats to reach number one in the AP Poll by climbing to the top of the 2015–16 NCAA Division I men's basketball rankings on February 8. He was named to the 35-man midseason watchlist for the Naismith Trophy on February 11.

At the conclusion of the regular season, Hart was unanimously selected first-team All-Big East. Hart was named a third-team All-American by the National Association of Basketball Coaches. He then helped Villanova win its second national championship in school history and first since 1985, scoring 23 points to lead the Wildcats in the Final Four against Oklahoma and 12 in the national championship game against North Carolina. On the season, he averaged 15.5 points, 6.8 rebounds, and 1.8 assists per game. Hart briefly thought about the 2016 NBA draft, but pulled his name out before the deadline.

=== Senior ===
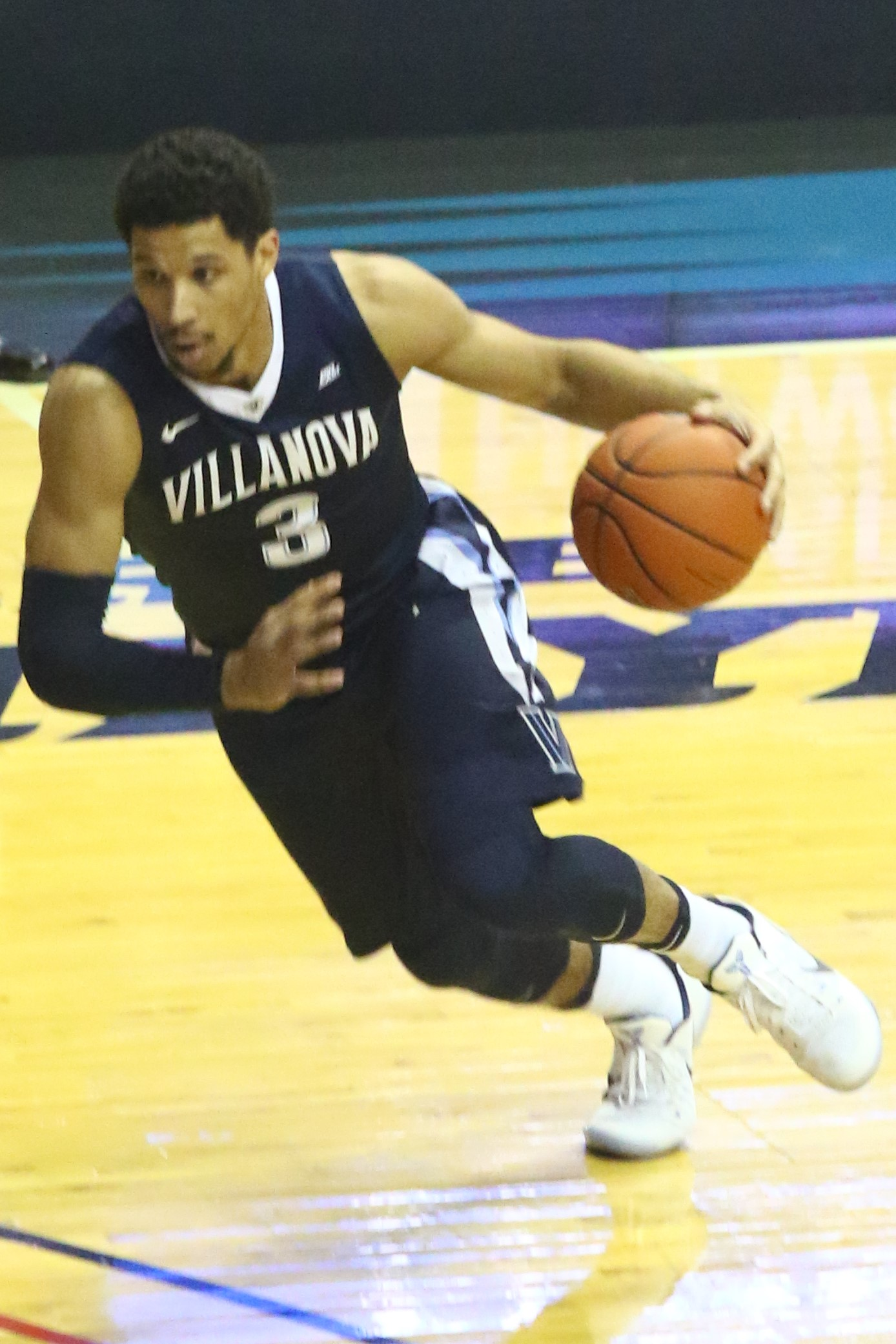
Hart as a Villanova senior in 2017

Coming into his senior season, Hart's Wildcats were projected to win the Big East by the coaches, and he was named the Preseason Player of the Year. He was named to the Associated Press preseason All-America team on November 2, 2016.

In November Hart scored a then-career high 30 points vs Wake Forest in a 96–77 win at the Charleston Classic. On December 10, Hart scored a career-high 37 points along with 11 rebounds and four assists in a 74–66 win over Notre Dame to push No. 1 Villanova to a 10–0 record.

On March 11, 2017, in the regular season finale versus Creighton, Hart scored 29 points in a 74–60 win. Unlike the previous season, Hart's Villanova career would end in disappointment, when Bronson Koenig outgunned Hart and the other Wildcats while leading Wisconsin to a 65–62 victory in the second round in the NCAA tournament.

On January 19, 2022, Hart's number 3 jersey was retired by the Wildcats.

== Professional career ==
=== Los Angeles Lakers (2017–2019) ===
Hart was selected in the first round of the 2017 NBA draft by the Utah Jazz with the 30th overall pick. He was subsequently traded to the Los Angeles Lakers along with the 42nd overall pick, Thomas Bryant, in exchange for the Lakers' 28th overall pick, Tony Bradley. In his first start on December 14, 2017, Hart recorded a double-double against the Cleveland Cavaliers, scoring 11 points and grabbing 10 rebounds. Hart fractured his left hand in practice on February 28 and was sidelined until the end of March. In his final game as a rookie, Hart scored a career-high 30 points against the Los Angeles Clippers, shooting 7 of 9 from three. Hart finished the season averaging 7.9 points per game and 4.2 rebounds per game, recording 8 double-doubles. Hart shot 39.6% from three, leading the team in three-point percentage.

Hart was named the league MVP of the 2018 NBA Summer League after averaging 24.2 points and 5.2 rebounds per game and setting a new Summer League game-high of 37 points for the Lakers' players. Prior to the 2018–19 season, he switched his jersey to No. 3 after playing with No. 5 as a rookie. On March 28, 2019, the Lakers announced that Hart had undergone a successful ultrasonic debridement procedure on his right knee patellar tendon and was expected to miss the remainder of 2018–19 season.

=== New Orleans Pelicans (2019–2022) ===
On July 6, 2019, the Lakers traded Hart, Lonzo Ball, Brandon Ingram, the draft rights to De'Andre Hunter, two first round picks, a first-round pick swap, and cash to the New Orleans Pelicans for All-Star Anthony Davis.

On February 16, 2021, Hart scored a season-high 27 points and grabbed nine rebounds during a 144–113 win against the Memphis Grizzlies. Following the season, Hart became a restricted free agent and re-signed with New Orleans on a three-year, $38 million contract.

On November 13, 2021, Hart recorded a career-high 11 assists in a 112–101 win over the Memphis Grizzlies.

=== Portland Trail Blazers (2022–2023) ===
On February 8, 2022, the Portland Trail Blazers acquired Hart, Nickeil Alexander-Walker, Tomáš Satoranský, Didi Louzada, a protected 2022 first-round draft pick, the better of New Orleans’ and Portland's 2026 second-round draft picks and New Orleans’ 2027 second-round draft pick from the New Orleans Pelicans in exchange for CJ McCollum, Larry Nance Jr. and Tony Snell. On March 12, Hart scored a career-high 44 points, along with 8 rebounds and 6 assists, on 15-of-21 shooting and 6-of-9 from beyond the arc in a 127–118 victory over the Washington Wizards.

On November 7, 2022, Hart put up 12 points, nine rebounds, and eight assists, alongside a buzzer-beating, game-winning three in a 110–107 win over the Miami Heat.

=== New York Knicks (2023–present) ===
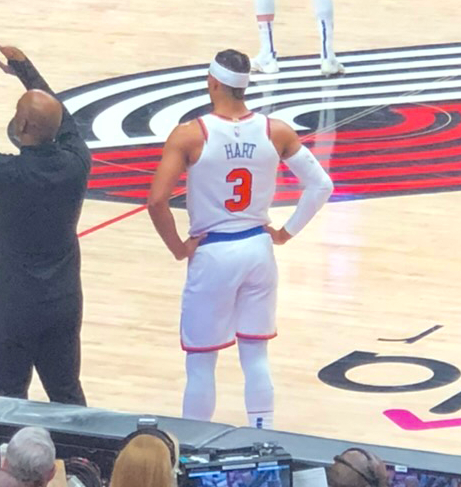
Hart stands next to his former coach Chauncey Billups during a game against the Trail Blazers in 2024.

==== 2022–23 season ====
On February 8, 2023, the Trail Blazers reached an agreement to trade Hart to the New York Knicks for Cam Reddish, Ryan Arcidiacono, Sviatoslav Mykhailiuk, and draft considerations. The following day, the deal was reworked into a four-team trade involving the Trail Blazers, Knicks, Philadelphia 76ers and Charlotte Hornets, with the Knicks receiving Hart, the Trail Blazers receiving Arcidiacono, Reddish, Matisse Thybulle, and draft considerations, the 76ers receiving Jalen McDaniels and the Hornets receiving Mykhailiuk. On February 11, Hart made his Knicks debut, recording 11 points, four assists, and seven rebounds in a 126–120 win over the Utah Jazz. On April 16, Hart made his career playoff debut, recording a double double of 17 points and 10 rebounds, along with two assists and a steal in a game 1 win over the Cleveland Cavaliers.

==== 2023–24 season ====
On August 10, 2023, Hart signed a four-year, $81 million extension with the Knicks. On January 30, 2024, Hart recorded his first career triple-double with 10 points, 10 rebounds, and 10 assists in a 118–103 win over the Utah Jazz. On February 8, Hart recorded his second career triple-double with 23 points, 10 rebounds, and 12 assists in a 122–108 loss to the Dallas Mavericks. On February 26, Hart put up a game-winning layup in a 113–111 win over the Detroit Pistons. On March 18, Hart played all 48 minutes of a victory against the Golden State Warriors, joining Clyde Frazier and Jerry Lucas as the only players in franchise history to accomplish the feat. On April 20, during Game 1 of a first round match up against the Philadelphia 76ers, Hart scored 22 points and grabbed 13 rebounds during a 111–104 win.

==== 2024–25 season ====
On December 30, 2024, Hart put up a triple-double with 23 points, 15 rebounds, and 10 assists in a 126–106 win over the Washington Wizards. In the next game on January 1, 2025, Hart put up another triple-double with 15 points, 14 rebounds, and 12 assists in a 119–103 win over the Utah Jazz. He became the fifth player in Knicks franchise history to achieve consecutive triple-doubles, joining Richie Guerin, Jerry Lucas, Walt Frazier, and Micheal Ray Richardson. On March 25, Hart recorded 16 points, 12 rebounds, and 11 assists in a 128–113 victory over the Dallas Mavericks, setting a franchise record for the most triple-doubles in a season with nine. He started all 77 games he played in during the 2024–25 NBA season, averaging 13.6 points, 9.6 rebounds, and 5.9 assists.

On May 12, 2025, Hart was awarded the NBA annual "minutes leader" award for the 2024-25 season, averaging 37.6 minutes per game. In Game 6 of the Eastern Conference Semifinals, Hart recorded 10 points, 11 rebounds, and 11 assists in a 119–81 win over the defending champion Boston Celtics. It was the third playoff triple-double in franchise history and the first since Walt Frazier in 1972.

==== 2025–26 season ====
On July 16, 2025, Hart underwent a surgical procedure on his right ring finger, having suffered an injury during the playoffs. On November 2, Hart revealed that he was suffering from nerve damage in his shooting hand, specifically numbness in his ring finger. On May 21, 2026, Hart had a playoff career-high 26 points in a 109–93 victory over the Cleveland Cavaliers in Game 2 of the Eastern Conference Finals. In Game 5 of the NBA Finals, Hart helped the Knicks achieve a 94–90 win in Game 5 and close out the NBA Finals against the San Antonio Spurs, 4–1, securing the Knicks' first NBA championship in 53 years. He, Jalen Brunson, and Mikal Bridges became the first trio of players to win both an NCAA and NBA championship together.

== National team career ==
Hart was a member of the United States men's national basketball team that competed in the 2023 FIBA Basketball World Cup. He led the team in rebounding during that tournament with 5.3 rebounds per game. However, Team USA finished in fourth place.

== Awards and honors ==
NBA

- NBA Champion: 2026
- NBA Cup champion: 2025
- NBA minutes played leaders: 2025

NCAA

- NCAA champion: 2016
- Consensus first-team All-American: 2017
- Third-team All-American – NABC: 2016
- Senior CLASS Award: 2017
- Julius Erving Award: 2017
- Big East Player of the Year: 2017
- Big East co-Defensive Player of the Year: 2017
- 2× First-team All-Big East: 2016, 2017
- Big East Sixth Man of the Year: 2015
- Big East All-Freshman Team: 2014
- 2× Big East tournament MOP: 2015, 2017
- Robert V. Geasey Trophy: 2017
- No. 3 retired by Villanova Wildcats

Other

Eagle Scout: 2013

== Career statistics ==
Legend
GP	Games played	GS	Games started	MPG	Minutes per game
FG%	Field goal percentage	3P%	3-point field goal percentage	FT%	Free throw percentage
RPG	Rebounds per game	APG	Assists per game	SPG	Steals per game
BPG	Blocks per game	PPG	Points per game	**Bold**	Career high
†	Won an NBA championship	*	Led the league

=== NBA ===
==== Regular season ====
Year	Team	GP	GS	MPG	FG%	3P%	FT%	RPG	APG	SPG	BPG	PPG
2017–18	L.A. Lakers	63	23	23.2	.469	.396	.703	4.2	1.3	.7	.3	7.9
2018–19	L.A. Lakers	67	22	25.6	.407	.336	.688	3.7	1.4	1.0	**.6**	7.8
2019–20	New Orleans	65	16	27.0	.423	.342	.739	6.5	1.7	1.0	.4	10.1
2020–21	New Orleans	47	4	28.7	.439	.326	.775	8.0	2.3	.8	.3	9.2
2021–22	New Orleans	41	40	33.5	.505	.323	.753	7.8	4.1	1.1	.3	13.4
2021–22	Portland	13	13	32.1	.503	.373	.772	5.4	4.3	1.2	.2	**19.9**
2022–23	Portland	51	51	33.4	.504	.304	.731	8.2	3.9	1.1	.2	9.5
2022–23	New York	25	1	30.0	**.586**	**.519**	.789	7.0	3.6	1.4	.5	10.2
2023–24	New York	**81**	42	33.4	.434	.310	**.791**	8.3	4.1	.9	.3	9.4
2024–25	New York	77	**77**	**37.6***	.525	.333	.776	**9.6**	**5.9**	**1.5**	.4	13.6
2025–26†	New York	66	53	30.2	.508	.413	.720	7.4	4.8	1.1	.3	12.0
Career		596	342	30.4	.475	.350	.750	7.0	3.4	1.1	.3	10.5

==== Playoffs ====
Year	Team	GP	GS	MPG	FG%	3P%	FT%	RPG	APG	SPG	BPG	PPG
2023	New York	11	5	32.1	**.479**	.313	.636	7.4	2.2	.8	.3	10.4
2024	New York	13	13	**42.1**	.440	**.373**	.729	**11.5**	4.5	1.0	**.8**	**14.5**
2025	New York	18	14	35.7	.472	.370	**.776**	8.8	4.4	1.1	.6	11.6
2026†	New York	**19**	**19**	32.3	.431	.326	.606	8.9	**4.6**	**1.7**	.2	10.4
Career		61	51	35.4	.452	.346	.712	9.1	4.1	1.2	.4	11.6

=== College ===
Year	Team	GP	GS	MPG	FG%	3P%	FT%	RPG	APG	SPG	BPG	PPG
2013–14	Villanova	34	1	21.4	.500	.313	.677	4.4	.9	.6	.3	7.8
2014–15	Villanova	36	2	25.5	**.515**	**.464**	.670	4.5	1.5	1.1	**.4**	10.1
2015–16	Villanova	**40**	**39**	31.4	.513	.357	**.752**	**6.8**	1.9	1.2	.3	15.5
2016–17	Villanova	36	35	**33.1**	.510	.404	.747	6.4	**2.9**	**1.6**	.3	**18.7**
Career		146	77	28.0	.511	.389	.720	5.6	1.8	1.1	.3	13.2

== Personal life ==
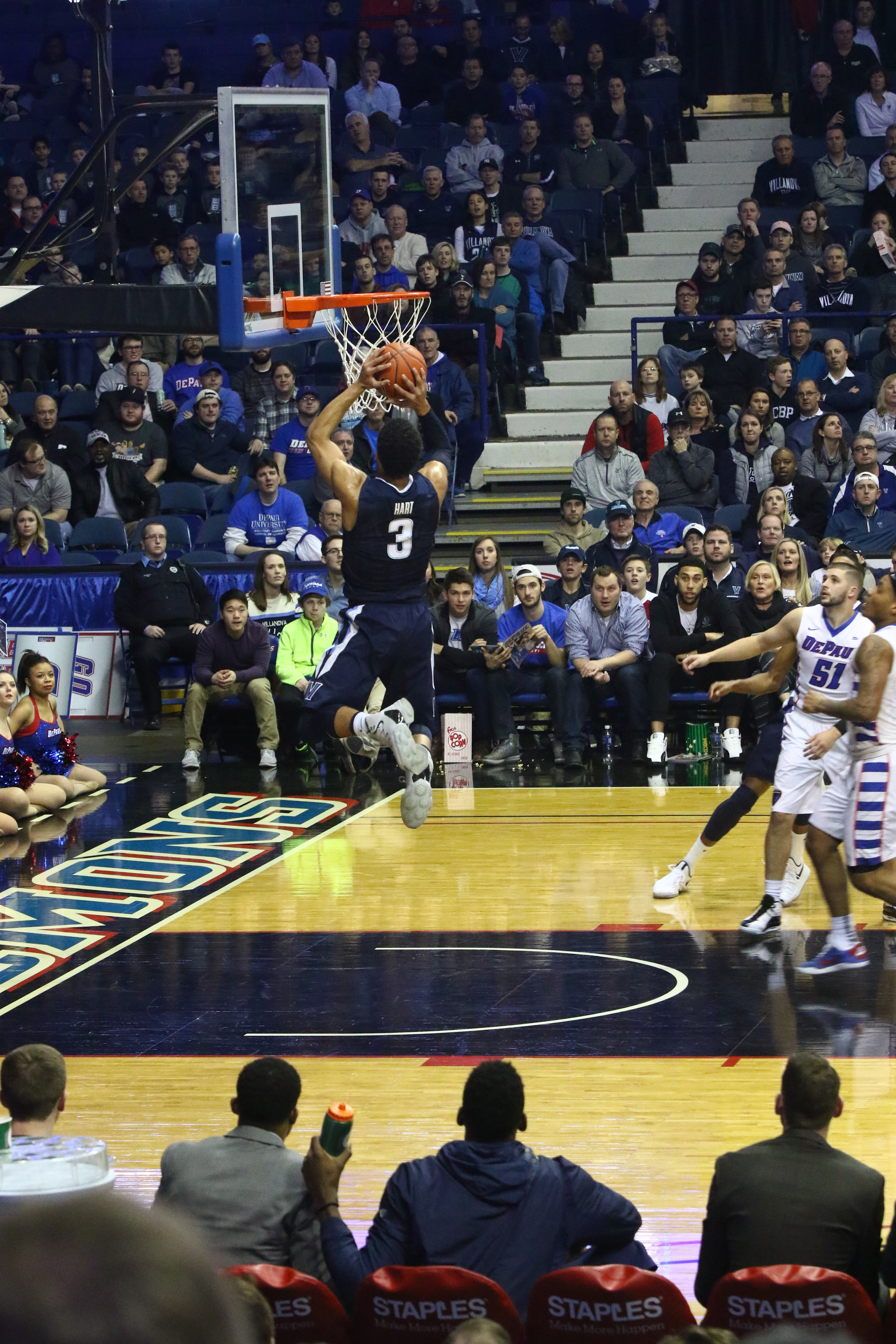
Hart dunking the basketball

Hart is a Christian. He married registered nurse Shannon Phillips, his high school sweetheart, on August 28, 2021, in Miami. The couple welcomed twin sons in May 2023. Hart's grand-uncle is baseball player Elston Howard.

Hart has played video games, such as Call of Duty: Modern Warfare, on his Twitch channel. Hart is also known for his love of candy, particularly Mike and Ike. He reportedly consumes large amounts of candy before every game and once exchanged his autograph for two boxes of Mike and Ike. During the 2024 playoffs, the company sent him several boxes of "Josh Hart 3 Point Mix". In 2025, the company made Hart their first "Chief Candy Officer" and promoted him to "President of Candy Ops" in 2026.

He is a fan of his hometown American football team Washington Commanders and of English Premier League football club Chelsea F.C..

In October 2020, he donated $10,000 to the relief efforts for the Napa Valley wildfires.

Hart resides in Harrison, New York.

Hart is a fan of Bungie's video games, having demoed Destiny 2's "Gambit" game mode alongside various streamers while playing for the Los Angeles Lakers. He also sponsored Bungie's rebooted Marathon in 2026.

== See also ==
- List of NBA annual minutes leaders
