= Marcus Paige =

American basketball coach and player (born 1993)

- Paige with the Greensboro Swarm

Charlotte 49ers
- Title: Assistant coach
- League: American Conference

Personal information
- Born: September 11, 1993 (age 33) Cedar Rapids, Iowa, U.S.
- Listed height: 6 ft 0 in (1.83 m)
- Listed weight: 175 lb (79 kg)

Career information
- High school: Linn-Mar (Marion, Iowa)
- College: North Carolina (2012–2016)
- NBA draft: 2016: 2nd round, 55th overall pick
- Drafted by: Brooklyn Nets
- Playing career: 2016–2023
- Position: Point guard / shooting guard
- Number: 4
- Coaching career: 2023–present

Career history

Playing
- 2016–2017: Salt Lake City Stars
- 2017–2018: Charlotte Hornets
- 2017–2018: →Greensboro Swarm
- 2018–2021: Partizan
- 2021–2022: Orléans
- 2022–2023: Obradoiro

Coaching
- 2023–2026: North Carolina (assistant)
- 2026–present: Charlotte (assistant)

Career highlights
- 2× Serbian Cup winner (2019, 2020); ABA League Supercup winner (2019); Second-team All-American – SN (2014); First-team Academic All-American (2016); 2× Second-team Academic All-American (2014, 2015); First-team All-ACC (2014); Third-team All-ACC (2015); ACC Most Improved Player (2014); ACC All-Freshman team (2013); No. 5 honored by North Carolina Tar Heels; McDonald's All-American (2012); First-team Parade All-American (2012); Iowa Mr. Basketball (2012)
- Stats at NBA.com
- Stats at Basketball Reference

Marcus Taylor Paige (born September 11, 1993) is an American professional basketball coach and former player. He played college basketball for the North Carolina Tar Heels, where he helped lead the Tar Heels to the 2016 NCAA championship game, and now serves as an assistant coach at UNC Charlotte. In addition to being a citizen of the United States, Paige also has Serbian citizenship.

== High school career ==
Paige was rated as the number 22 overall player (and the best point guard) in the class of 2012 in the ESPNU 100, the number 35 player by Scout.com, and the number 34 player by Rivals.com.

In his junior year, Paige led Linn-Mar High School to an undefeated season and the 2011 4-A state title. Considered by scouts to be an excellent ball handler with shooting range to the three-point line, Paige also played on the AAU circuit with Martin Brothers Select.

On January 8, 2011, Paige verbally committed to play college basketball for North Carolina, turning down scholarship offers from Iowa State, Kansas, Minnesota, Virginia, Illinois, and Iowa.

In his senior season, Paige was the leader of his Linn-Mar team, as he averaged over 28 points per game. He also recorded the most single-game points total in school history with 49 against Cedar Rapids Kennedy in Substate. Paige's high school career ended when Linn-Mar was defeated by Iowa City West in the state semi-finals.

=== College recruitment ===
College recruiting
Name	Hometown	School	Height	Weight	Commit date
Marcus Paige; PG	Marion, IA	Linn-Mar HS	6 ft 1 in (1.85 m)	175 lb (79 kg)	Jan 8, 2011
Marcus Paige; PG	Recruit ratings: Scout: Rivals: (96)				

== College career ==
=== Freshman season ===
During his freshman season at North Carolina, Paige averaged 8.6 points and 4.6 assists per game and started 34 of 36 games for the Tar Heels. Throughout the season, his assist-to-turnover ratio was 1.8:1, which was sixth best in the Atlantic Coast Conference. His season high for points in a game was against Virginia Tech, with 19, and a season high for assists against Notre Dame with 10. Paige led the Tar Heels to the round of thirty-two where they eventually lost to the Kansas Jayhawks 70–58. At season's end, he was elected to both the ACC All-Academic Team and the Freshman All-American team.

=== Sophomore season ===
Paige improved his statistics from his freshman season. During his sophomore season, he averaged 17.5 points per game and 4.2 assists per game. Throughout the season, he shot 44% from the field, 39% from three-point range, and 87.7% from the free throw line. His points-per-game average was fourth in the ACC, and his free throw percentage was the highest in the entire conference. Paige led the Tar Heels to the NCAA tournament, where for a second year in a row, they lost in the round of thirty-two, this time against Iowa State 85–83. He was named second-team All-American, first-team All-ACC, and was awarded the ACC's Most Improved Player.

=== Junior season ===
Paige finished his junior season averaging 14.1 points and 4.5 assists per game. After a stellar sophomore season, Paige had a dip in offensive production. He managed to shoot 39.5% from three-point range while shooting only 41.3% from the field. For the season, Paige fell only one three-pointer short of tying Shammond Williams's record for most three-pointers made in a single season (which is now held by Justin Jackson at 101). Paige earned himself second-team Academic All-American honors for the second consecutive year, as he managed to also earn second-team All-ACC honors. His statistical drops are in part credited to a case of plantar fasciitis that Paige was fighting all year long.

=== Senior season ===
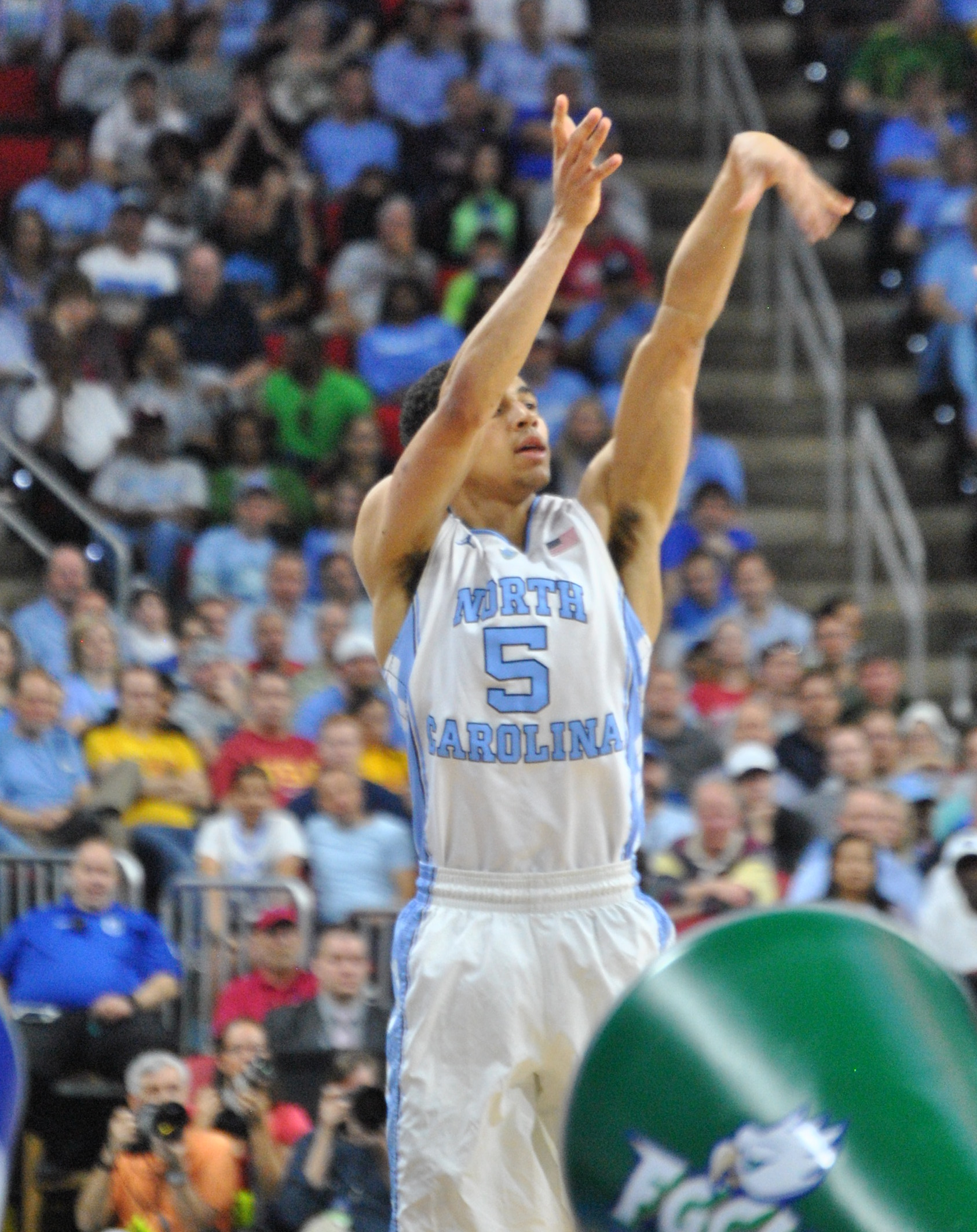
Paige in 2016

Paige was named preseason ACC player of the year. Early in the season, he was widely regarded to have been in a shooting slump. He broke the UNC record for the most career three-pointers made (299). However, he recovered late in the season and helped the Tar Heels win the 2016 ACC tournament and lead them to the 2016 NCAA championship game, where they faced Villanova. In the game, Paige scored 21 points and hit a game-tying circus three-pointer with 4.7 seconds left in the second half of regulation. However, Villanova's Kris Jenkins went on to score a buzzer beater to win the game 77–74.

== Professional career ==
=== Salt Lake City Stars (2016–2017) ===
On June 23, 2016, Paige was selected by the Brooklyn Nets with the 55th overall pick in the 2016 NBA draft. He was later traded to the Utah Jazz the following day. He signed with the Jazz on August 22, 2016, but was waived on October 13. On October 31, he was acquired by the Salt Lake City Stars of the NBA Development League. Paige appeared in 46 games and started 40 for the Salt Lake City Stars in the 2016–17 NBA Development league season. His season averages were 12.1 points, 2.1 rebounds, 2.2 assists in 32.7 minutes per game.

Paige joined the Minnesota Timberwolves for the 2017 NBA Summer League in Las Vegas.

=== Charlotte Hornets (2017–2018) ===
On August 1, 2017, Paige signed a two-way contract by the Charlotte Hornets. Under the terms of the deal, he and fellow two-way affiliate Mangok Mathiang split time between the Hornets and their G League affiliate, the Greensboro Swarm. Paige averaged 15.2 points, 3.0 rebounds, and 4.5 assists per game in 46 games with Greensboro. On June 29, 2018, the Hornets announced that they would decline a qualifying offer to Paige, making him a free agent.

=== Partizan (2018–2021) ===
On July 11, 2018, Paige signed a two-year contract with the Serbian club Partizan of the ABA League.

On February 12, 2019, Paige obtained a Serbian passport and Serbian citizenship. He signed a two-year deal on May 9, 2020.

On May 9, 2020, Paige signed a second two-year contract after helping the club to both the Serbian Cup and ABA League Supercup in 2019 and a second Serbian Cup in 2020. Partizan parted ways with him in August 2021.

=== Orléans Loiret (2021–2022) ===
On September 16, 2021, Paige signed with French club Orléans Loiret Basket of the LNB Pro A.

=== Monbus Obradoiro (2022–2023) ===
On July 17, 2022, Paige signed with Spanish club Monbus Obradoiro of the Liga ACB.

== Coaching career ==
=== Return to North Carolina (2023–2026) ===
On April 26, 2023, Paige agreed to join coach Hubert Davis's UNC coaching staff as director of team and player development. Paige filled the role vacated by another former Tar Heel in Jackie Manuel, who left his alma mater to take an on-the-bench coaching position at American University. Paige's hiring was officially announced by the school in June. Paige became a full assistant and assumed head coaching duties for the UNC junior varsity team with the 2024–25 season.

=== UNC Charlotte (2026 - Present) ===
Paige agreed to join coach Wes Miller's staff as an assistant coach on the Charlotte 49ers men's basketball team after Hubert Davis was fired as the head coach of the North Carolina Tar Heels.

== Career statistics ==
Legend
GP	Games played	GS	Games started	MPG	Minutes per game
FG%	Field goal percentage	3P%	3-point field goal percentage	FT%	Free throw percentage
RPG	Rebounds per game	APG	Assists per game	SPG	Steals per game
BPG	Blocks per game	PPG	Points per game	**Bold**	Career high

=== College ===
Year	Team	GP	GS	MPG	FG%	3P%	FT%	RPG	APG	SPG	BPG	PPG
2012–13	North Carolina	35	34	29.2	.356	.344	.836	2.7	4.6	1.4	.1	8.2
2013–14	North Carolina	34	33	35.6	.440	.389	.877	3.2	4.2	1.5	.2	17.5
2014–15	North Carolina	38	38	33.2	.413	.395	.865	2.9	4.5	1.7	.2	14.1
2015–16	North Carolina	34	34	31.6	.397	.355	.796	2.5	3.7	1.1	.4	13.4
Career		141	139	32.4	.407	.374	.848	2.8	4.3	1.4	.2	13.3

Source: sports-reference.com

=== Professional career ===
Legend
GP	Games played	MPG	Minutes per game	FG%	Field goal percentage
3P%	3-point field goal percentage	FT%	Free throw percentage	RPG	Rebounds per game
APG	Assists per game	SPG	Steals per game	BPG	Blocks per game
PPG	Points per game	**Bold**	Career high		Led the league

Year	Team	League	GP	MPG	FG%	3P%	FT%	RPG	APG	SPG	BPG	PPG
2016–17	Salt Lake City Stars	NBA D-League	46	32.7	.398	.354	.837	2.2	2.3	.9	.3	12.1
2017–18	Greensboro Swarm	NBA G League	46	32.6	.428	.373	.847	3.0	4.4	1.4	.2	15.2
2017–18	Charlotte Hornets	NBA	5	5.6	.286	.250	1.000	.8	.6	.0	.0	2.4
2018–19	Partizan	ABA League	60	24.2	.405	.375	.792	2.4	3.7	1.1	.3	10.2
2019–20	Partizan	ABA League	42	22.3	.461	.462	.857	1.5	1.9	.8	.3	9.9
2020–21	Partizan	ABA League	43	25.8	.424	.422	.767	1.3	2.4	.9	.3	8.9
2021–22	Orléans Loiret Basket	LNB Pro A	27	29.9	.454	.423	.860	1.8	3.4	1.1	.2	9.9
2022–23	Monbus Obradoiro	ACB	6	18.6	.294	.235	.857	.5	1.7	.8	.0	5.0
