= Ryan Arcidiacono =

American basketball player (born 1994)

Ryan Arcidiocono
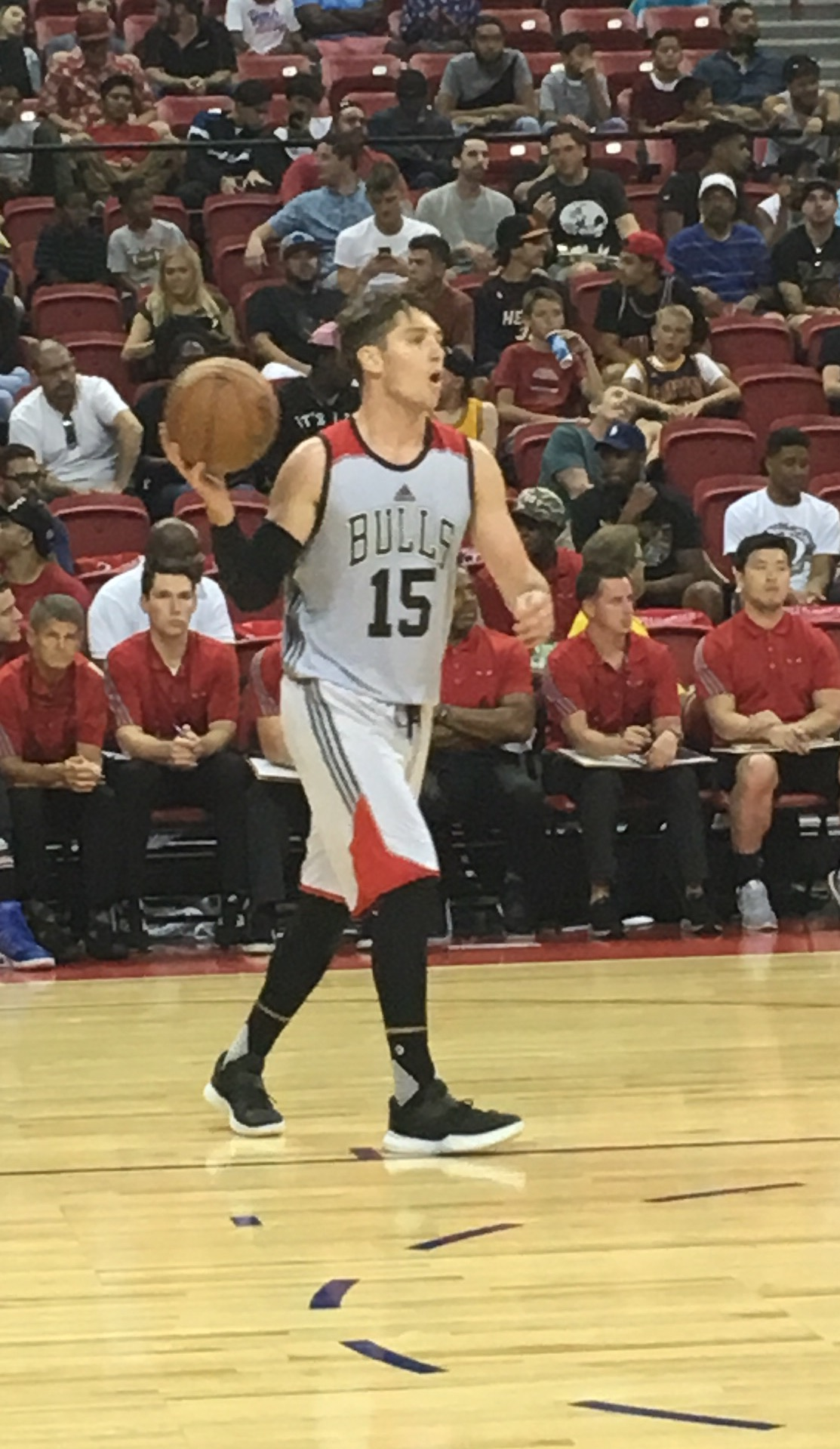
- Arcidiacono with the Chicago Bulls in 2017

No. 51 – Fraport Skyliners
- Position: Point guard / shooting guard
- League: Basketball Bundesliga; EuroCup

Personal information
- Born: March 26, 1994 (age 32) Philadelphia, Pennsylvania, U.S.
- Listed height: 6 ft 3 in (1.91 m)
- Listed weight: 195 lb (88 kg)

Career information
- High school: Neshaminy (Langhorne, Pennsylvania)
- College: Villanova (2012–2017)
- NBA draft: 2016: undrafted
- Playing career: 2016–present

Career history
- 2016–2017: Austin Spurs G League
- 2017–2021: Chicago Bulls
- 2017–2018: →Windy City Bulls
- 2021–2022: Maine Celtics
- 2022–2023: New York Knicks
- 2023: Portland Trail Blazers
- 2023–2024: New York Knicks
- 2024–2025: Windy City Bulls
- 2025: Trapani Shark
- 2026: Osos de Manatí
- 2026–present: Skyliners Frankfurt

Career highlights
- NCAA champion (2016); NCAA Tournament Most Outstanding Player (2016); Big East co-Player of the Year (2015); First-team All-Big East (2015); 2× Second-team All-Big East (2014, 2016); Big East All-Rookie Team (2013); No. 15 jersey retired by Villanova Wildcats
- Stats at NBA.com
- Stats at Basketball Reference

Ryan Curran Arcidiacono (/ɑːrˌtʃiːdiˈækənoʊ/ ar-CHEE-dee-AK-ə-noh; born March 26, 1994) is an American professional basketball player for Skyliners Frankfurt of the Basketball Bundesliga (BBL) and the EuroCup. Nicknamed "the Arch of Dimes", he is considered one of the greatest players in Villanova basketball history. Arcidiacono was part of Villanova's 2016 national championship team, where he was awarded the Most Outstanding Player award and assisted on the game-winning basket to Kris Jenkins as time expired in the championship game.

As a freshman at Villanova, Arcidiacono was named to the Big East Conference All-Rookie Team. As a junior, he was co-winner of the conference's Player of the Year award. Prior to a successful college career, he attended Neshaminy High School, where he averaged 20.4 points and 5.6 rebounds per game as a junior to lead Neshaminy to the PIAA playoffs.

== Early life ==
Arcidiacono was born on March 26, 1994, in Philadelphia, Pennsylvania. He has three older siblings, Sabrina, Nicole, Michael; and younger twin siblings, Christopher and Courtney. His parents, Joe and Patti Arcidiacono, met at Villanova University, where Joe was an offensive lineman on the football team.

His father installed a 6-foot plastic hoop in the family living room. Young Arcidiacono would often practice shooting jump shots and hitting layups on the small hoop before progressing to an actual basketball court. At one AAU game, Arcidiacono scored 50 points. At another, he hit eight three-pointers in a row. When he was in 7th grade at a basketball camp, Villanova coach Jay Wright said he would one day play for the Wildcats. Growing up, his favorite athletes were the 76ers' Allen Iverson and the Eagles' Brian Dawkins. In eighth grade, Arcidiacono trained with former Penn State player Ben Luber.

== High school career ==
Arcidiacono attended Neshaminy High School, where he was coached by Jerry Devine. Arcidiacono led the team to a PIAA Class AAAA tournament as a sophomore. In a playoff game against Bartram High School, he tallied a triple-double of 26 points, 10 rebounds, and 10 assists. He averaged 18 points per game and was named to the Class AAAA second team. At the end of his sophomore season, Arcidiacono traveled with his AAU team, the PA Playaz, to North Carolina for the Bob Gibbons Tournament of Champions. In the first game of the tournament, he crashed into the floor face-first, an injury that required eight stitches. Despite the advice of doctors, he decided to play in the following game and responded with 35 points. He continued to score at the same pace for the remainder of the tournament, and major college programs took notice. Arcidiacono received recruiting offers from Syracuse, Florida, Texas, and Villanova, among others. In October 2010, after attending Villanova's Hoops Mania event, he committed to play for the Villanova Wildcats.

As a junior, Arcidiacono guided Neshaminy to a 22–7 record while averaging 20.4 points, 5.6 rebounds, 5.0 assists, and 2.2 steals. He surpassed the 1,000 point mark in a game against Pennsbury, scoring 29 points in an 83–52 win.

The Neshaminy Redskins reached the state quarterfinals in 2011 before losing to Penn Wood. After his junior season, he was named the Bucks County Courier Times player of the year. The Philadelphia Inquirer selected him to the first-team all-Southeastern Pennsylvania.

He began to feel pain in his lower back shortly after the end of his junior season. In May 2011, while attending a basketball camp at the Deron Williams Academy in Chicago, Arcidiacono complained of poor mobility and soreness. He was diagnosed with a herniated disk in his back, forcing him to miss his senior season. Arcidiacono had surgery to repair the disk on December 21, and he could not leave his house for two weeks thereafter. Arcidiacono finished his career at Neshaminy High School as the program's all-time leading scorer. He tallied 1,498 points, 449 rebounds, 378 assists, 178 steals, and 160 three-pointers. Despite missing the season, ESPNU ranked him among the top 50 seniors in the country.

== College career ==
=== Freshman season (2012–2013) ===
Arcidiacono began his freshman season not fully recovered from his back injury. He made his college debut scoring 11 points against the University of the District of Columbia. In the following game against Marshall, Arcidiacono became the first Wildcat freshman to score 25 points since Scottie Reynolds.

Arcidiacono garnered his first Big East rookie of the week honors on November 18, after an 18-point six-assist performance in an overtime win against Purdue. He was again named Big East rookie of the week on December 31 after a 17-point performance against NJIT. He had a career-high 32 points on January 2, 2013, to propel Villanova to a 98–86 overtime victory over St. John's. This performance earned Arcidiacono Big East rookie of the week honors for the week of January 6. In the January 26 contest against third-ranked Syracuse, Arcidiacono made a 3-pointer with 2.2 seconds remaining in regulation to tie the game at 61. The Wildcats ended up defeating Syracuse in overtime 75–71. Arcidiacono earned his fourth rookie of the week honors in the last week of the regular season.

Led by Arcidiacono, Villanova enjoyed a 20–14 season and reached the NCAA tournament where they were seeded ninth and matched up with eighth seed North Carolina in the first round. Arcidiacono had 10 points, but his Wildcats lost to the Tar Heels 78–71. He posted averages of 11.9 points, 3.5 assists and 2.1 rebounds per game. Arcidiacono started all 34 games and played an average of 34.0 minutes per game, which led the team. He was named Philadelphia Big 5 rookie of the year and was selected to the Big East All-Rookie team.

=== Sophomore season (2013–2014) ===
Going into his sophomore campaign, Arcidiacono focused on improving his footwork and shooting mechanics. Arcidiacono hit a 3-pointer with 10.1 seconds left in a November 29 matchup against Kansas despite not making a shot until that point. The Wildcats held on to upset the second-ranked Jayhawks 63–59. Arcidiacono had his first double-double with 20 points and 11 assists in a 94–85 overtime win over Marquette on January 25, 2014. He recorded a season-high 21 points in the February 18 game against Providence. With 3.1 seconds left in double overtime, Arcidiacono completed a three-point play to help the Wildcats to an 82–79 victory.

He was an honorable mention all-Big East selection after the regular season. He joined teammate Darrun Hilliard on the All-Big 5 Second Team. He posted averages of 9.9 points, 3.5 assists and 2.4 rebounds per contest. Arcidiacono started 33 games and played an average of 31.1 minutes per game, leading the team.

=== Junior season (2014–2015) ===
Arcidiacono was selected to the preseason second team All-Big East. In its preseason top 100 college basketball player rankings, ESPN ranked Arcidiacono #84. Arcidiacono was named to the 36-man Bob Cousy Award preseason watch list. On November 14, Arcidiacono scored 16 points in his season debut, a 77–66 victory over Lehigh. He had 10 points in an 80–54 victory over Seton Hall on February 17, 2015, and received a hit on the nose from the forearm of Seton Hall guard Sterling Gibbs, who was suspended and subsequently apologized. On March 3, Arcidiacono scored 23 points, including the go-ahead 3-pointer, in a 76–72 win over Creighton. In the semifinals of the Big East tournament, Villanova defeated Providence 63–61 after Arcidiacono hit a pair of free throws with 3.1 seconds remaining.

After overcoming a nagging right wrist injury in December, Arcidiacono averaged 12.9 points and 3.6 assists and made 45.5 percent of his attempts from the floor and 44.4 percent from the three-point arc in Big East conference play. He shared Big East Player of the Year honors with Providence guard Kris Dunn, feeling "kind of shocked" about the selection. Arcidiacono was a 2014–15 Men's All-District II Team selection by the U.S. Basketball Writers Association. He was named to the Second Team All-District V by the National Association of Basketball Coaches. He was named to the All-Big 5 First Team.

=== Senior season (2015–2016) ===
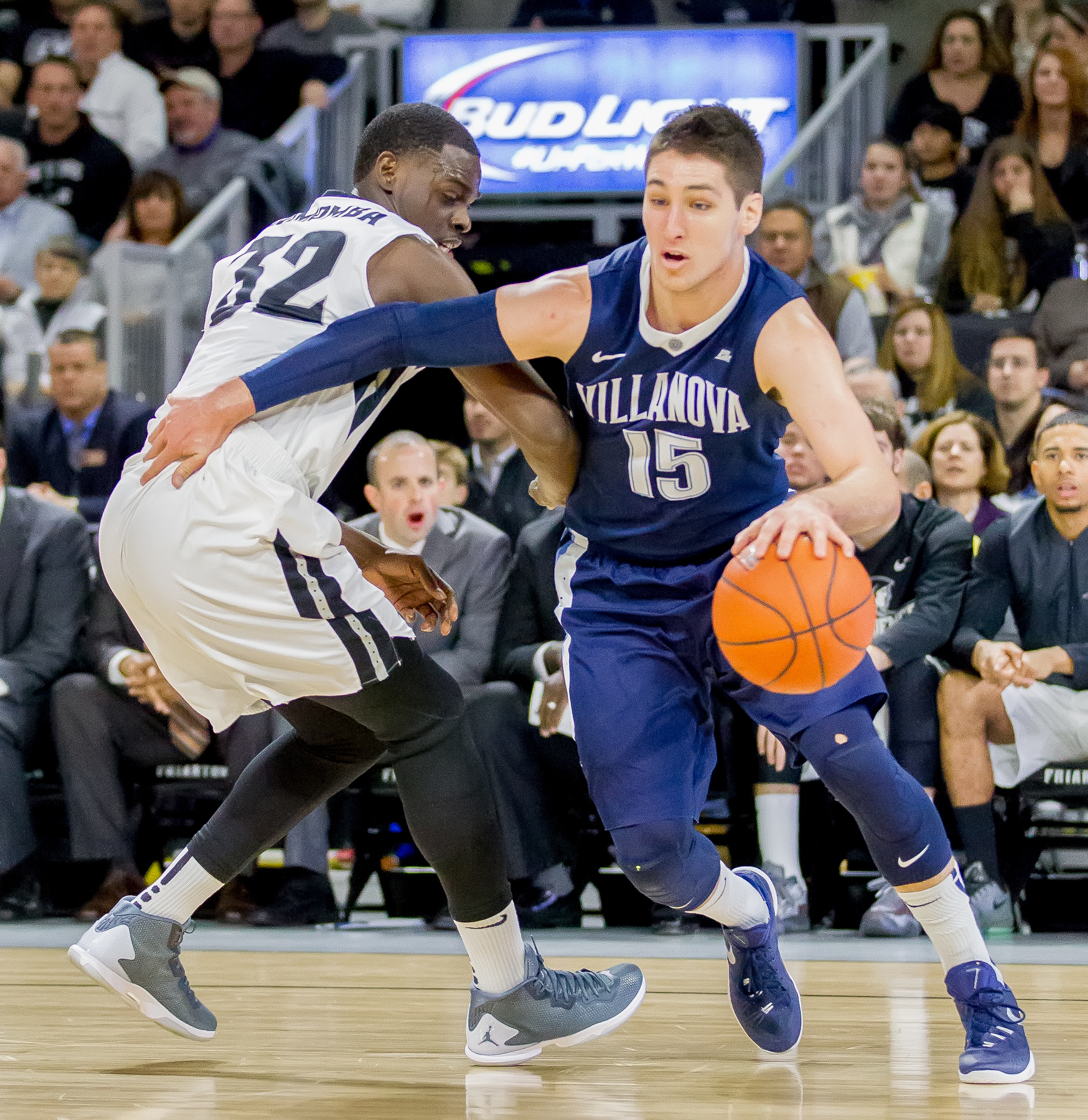
Arcidiacono vs. Providence in February 2016

Going into his senior year at Villanova, Arcidiacono was named to the Preseason First Team All-Big East. He was listed on the Oscar Robertson Award preseason watchlist as well as the Naismith College Player of the Year watchlist. In his season debut, a 91–54 win over Fairleigh Dickinson on November 13, Arcidiacono had 12 points. On December 31, in a 95–64 victory over sixth-ranked Xavier, he connected on seven 3-pointers and scored 27 points.

He was named one of the ten finalists for the Senior CLASS Award. At the conclusion of the regular season, Arcidiacono was selected to the Second Team All-Big East. Arcidiacono helped lead Villanova to the 2016 NCAA Division I men's basketball championship, where he had the game-winning assist to Kris Jenkins in the title game against North Carolina, and was named Most Outstanding Player for his performance. Arcidiacono averaged 12.5 points and 4.2 rebounds per game as a senior, shooting 39.4 percent from three-point range.

On February 12, 2020, he had his number 15 jersey retired at Villanova.

== Professional career ==
=== Austin Spurs (2016–2017) ===
After going undrafted in the 2016 NBA draft, Arcidiacono joined the San Antonio Spurs for the 2016 NBA Summer League. On July 14, 2016, he signed with the Spurs, but was waived on October 22 after appearing in three preseason games. Seven days later, he was acquired by the Austin Spurs of the NBA Development League as an affiliate of San Antonio.

For the 2017–18 season, Arcidiacono originally signed with the Italian team Juvecaserta Basket. However, on July 14, 2017, it was announced that Juvecaserta would not be accepted in Serie A, as it was rejected by Com.Tec. (Commission of control on the companies' financial statements). As a result, he voided the contract with the Italian company.

=== Chicago Bulls (2017–2021) ===
On July 25, 2017, Arcidiacono signed a two-way contract with the Chicago Bulls, the team he played with the 2017 NBA Summer League in Las Vegas. As a result, he would split time between Chicago and their G League affiliate, the Windy City Bulls throughout the season, with Arcidiacono spending most of his time out in the Windy City. He also became the first player in franchise history to sign a two-way deal. After playing sparingly with Chicago, Arcidiacono averaged 13.8 points, 5 rebounds, and 8.6 assists per game with Windy City. He posted 7.2 points, 4.2 rebounds, and four assists per game in the 2018 NBA Summer League with Chicago.

On July 31, 2018, Arcidiacono signed a standard contract with the Bulls. On October 18, he recorded eight points, four rebounds and a career-high eight assists in the season-opener against the Philadelphia 76ers. With three starters injured early in the season, he started to see an increase in playing time. On November 26, 2018, Arcidiacono scored a career-high 22 points with four rebounds, two assists and two steals in a 107–108 loss to the San Antonio Spurs.

On July 2, 2019, Arcidiacono signed a three-year contract with the Bulls.

=== Maine Celtics (2021–2022) ===
On September 28, 2021, Arcidiacono signed with the Boston Celtics. However, he was waived on October 16. On October 23, he signed with the Maine Celtics as an affiliate player. On January 6, 2022, Arcidiacono signed a 10-day contract with the New York Knicks. On January 13, without appearing in a game, Arcidiacono was waived by the Knicks. On January 19, Arcidiacono signed a standard 10-day contract with the team, but didn't play a game for them again. On January 31, 2022, Arcidiacono was reacquired by the Maine Celtics.

=== New York Knicks (2022–2023) ===
On February 13, Arcidiacono was signed by the New York Knicks for the rest of the 2021–22 season.

On September 17, 2022, Arcidiacono re-signed with the Knicks.

=== Portland Trail Blazers (2023) ===
On February 9, 2023, the Knicks reached an agreement to trade Arcidiacono, Sviatoslav Mykhailiuk, Cam Reddish and draft considerations to the Portland Trail Blazers for Josh Hart, Arcidiacono's former teammate at Villanova. The deal was completed as a four-team trade involving the Charlotte Hornets and Philadelphia 76ers, with the Hornets receiving Mykhailiuk, the 76ers receiving Jalen McDaniels, the Knicks receiving Hart and the Trail Blazers receiving Arcidiacono, Reddish and Matisse Thybulle. On April 1, Arcidiacono was waived by the Trail Blazers.

=== Return to the Knicks (2023–2024) ===
On September 15, 2023, Arcidiacono signed with the New York Knicks, returning to the franchise for a second stint.

During his second stint with the Knicks, Arcidiacono set an NBA record for the most consecutive games played without scoring a single point, failing to score in 20 consecutive games.

On February 8, 2024, Arcidiacono, Malachi Flynn, Evan Fournier, Quentin Grimes and two second-round picks were traded to the Detroit Pistons in exchange for Bojan Bogdanović and Alec Burks. Two days later, he was waived.

=== Return to Windy City (2024–2025) ===
On February 23, 2024, Arcidiacono joined the Windy City Bulls for the rest of the 2023–24 NBA G League season. He returned to Windy City for the 2024–25 season.

=== Trapani Shark (2025) ===
On July 10, 2025, Arcidiacono signed with Trapani Shark of the Lega Basket Serie A (LBA).

== National team career ==
In June 2012, Arcidiacono was called up to the United States national under-18 team. In June 2013, he was called up as one of the candidates to join the 2013 FIBA Under-19 World Championship.

In May 2015, he was selected to play for the Italian "experimental" national team in international friendly tournaments. However, he was unable to represent Italy in official competition, as his claim to Italian citizenship by Jus sanguinis was denied because one of his ancestors had previously renounced it.

== Career statistics ==
Legend
GP	Games played	GS	Games started	MPG	Minutes per game
FG%	Field goal percentage	3P%	3-point field goal percentage	FT%	Free throw percentage
RPG	Rebounds per game	APG	Assists per game	SPG	Steals per game
BPG	Blocks per game	PPG	Points per game	**Bold**	Career high

=== NBA ===
==== Regular season ====
Year	Team	GP	GS	MPG	FG%	3P%	FT%	RPG	APG	SPG	BPG	PPG
2017–18	Chicago	24	0	12.7	.415	.290	.833	1.0	1.5	.5	.0	2.0
2018–19	Chicago	**81**	**32**	**24.2**	.447	.373	**.873**	**2.7**	**3.3**	**.8**	.0	**6.7**
2019–20	Chicago	58	4	16.0	.409	.391	.711	1.9	1.7	.5	**.1**	4.5
2020–21	Chicago	44	0	10.2	.419	.373	.650	1.5	1.3	.2	.0	3.1
2021–22	New York	10	0	7.6	**.500**	**.444**	—	.8	.4	.1	.0	1.6
2022–23	New York	11	0	2.4	.200	.333	—	.4	.2	.2	.0	.3
2022–23	Portland	9	4	16.2	.250	.350	—	1.2	2.3	.3	.0	2.6
2023–24	New York	20	0	2.3	.000	.000	—	.4	.2	.1	.0	.0
Career		257	40	15.3	.421	.369	.807	1.8	1.9	.5	.0	4.0

=== College ===
Year	Team	GP	GS	MPG	FG%	3P%	FT%	RPG	APG	SPG	BPG	PPG
2012–13	Villanova	34	34	**34.1**	.380	.327	.824	2.1	3.5	**1.1**	.0	11.9
2013–14	Villanova	34	33	31.1	.395	.345	.703	2.4	3.5	**1.1**	.0	9.9
2014–15	Villanova	36	36	30.4	.394	.372	.813	1.7	3.6	**1.1**	**.1**	10.1
2015–16	Villanova	**40**	**40**	32.1	**.445**	**.394**	**.836**	**2.9**	**4.2**	**1.1**	.0	**12.5**
Career		144	143	31.9	.397	.358	.800	2.3	3.7	1.1	.0	11.1

== Personal life ==
He is married to Claire and the two share a daughter.
