= 2015–16 Villanova Wildcats men's basketball team =

American college basketball season

2015–16 Villanova Wildcats men's basketball

NCAA tournament National Champions Big East regular season champions Philadelphia Big 5 champions NIT Season Tip-Off champions

National Championship Game, W 77–74 vs. North Carolina
- Conference: Big East Conference

Ranking
- Coaches: No. 1
- AP: No. 6
- Record: 35–5 (16–2 Big East)
- Head coach: Jay Wright (15th season)
- Assistant coaches: Baker Dunleavy; Ashley Howard; Kyle Neptune
- Home arena: The Pavilion; Wells Fargo Center

2015–16 Big East men's basketball standings
	Conf.				Overall
Team	W		L	PCT	W		L	PCT
No. 6 Villanova	16	–	2	.889	35	–	5	.875
No. 9 Xavier	14	–	4	.778	28	–	5	.848
No. 20 Seton Hall †	12	–	6	.667	25	–	9	.735
Providence	10	–	8	.556	24	–	11	.686
Butler	10	–	8	.556	22	–	11	.667
Creighton	9	–	9	.500	20	–	15	.571
Marquette	8	–	10	.444	20	–	13	.606
Georgetown	7	–	11	.389	15	–	18	.455
DePaul	3	–	15	.167	9	–	22	.290
St. John's	1	–	17	.056	8	–	24	.250
† 2016 Big East tournament winner Rankings from AP poll

The 2015–16 Villanova Wildcats men's basketball team represented Villanova University in the 2015–16 NCAA Division I men's basketball season. Led by the school's 8th head coach Jay Wright in his 15th year, the Wildcats were members of the Big East Conference and played most of their home games at The Pavilion, with some select home games at the Wells Fargo Center. The Wildcats finished the season with a record of 35–5, 16–2 to win the Big East regular season. They lost in the championship of the Big East tournament to Seton Hall. The Wildcats earned an at-large bid to the NCAA tournament as a No. 2 seed. In the Tournament, they defeated UNC Asheville, Iowa, Miami, and overall #1 seed Kansas to earn a trip to the Final Four, the fifth in school history (although the 1971 Final Four season was vacated by the NCAA). In the Final Four, the Wildcats routed No. 2 seed Oklahoma by the largest margin in Final Four history to face No. 1 seeded North Carolina for the national championship. Led by Final Four MOP, Ryan Arcidiacono, the Wildcats won the National Championship 77–74 on a three-point shot by Kris Jenkins, assisted by Arcidiacano, as time expired. The Wildcats won the school's second national title, having previously won the 1985 NCAA tournament.

Their 35 wins were the most in school history, breaking a record of 33 wins set the previous season. In beating No. 3 seed Miami (AP No. 10), No. 1 seed Kansas (AP No. 1), No. 2 seed Oklahoma (AP No. 7) and No. 1 seed UNC (AP No. 3), Villanova became the first school in 31 years — since the 1985 Villanova Wildcats — to not only beat four top-three seeds on the way to a national title but to also beat four straight opponents ranked in the AP top 10, in addition to beating AP ranked Iowa in the Round of 32, by an average victory margin of 19 points per game. Villanova's run included two of the ten most offensively efficient games in the analytics era (2002–present), beating Miami and Oklahoma by scoring 1.56 and 1.51 points per possession in the Sweet Sixteen and Final Four, respectively. It has been called perhaps the most dominant tournament championship run of all time, and the most dominant of the analytics era by a wide margin.

10 years after Villanova's championship run, three key members of the team in Mikal Bridges, Jalen Brunson and Josh Hart led the New York Knicks to their first NBA Finals win in 53 years, with the trio starting every playoff game and Brunson being named Finals MVP.

== Previous season ==
The Wildcats finished the 2014–15 season 33–3, 16–2 in Big East play to win the Big East regular season championship. They defeated Marquette, Providence, and Xavier to become champions of the Big East tournament. They received the conference's automatic bid to the NCAA tournament as a No.1 seed where they defeated Lafayette in the Second Round before losing in the Third Round to NC State.

With their 31st win of the season, a 63–61 win over Providence in the semifinals of the Big East tournament, the Wildcats set a single season record for wins, which would eventually finish at 33.

== Offseason ==
=== Departures ===
Name	Number	Pos.	Height	Weight	Year	Hometown	Notes
Darrun Hilliard	4	G	6'6"	215	Senior	Bethlehem, PA	Graduated/2015 NBA draft
Dylan Ennis	52	G	6'2"	192	Junior	Brampton, Ontario	Graduated/Transferred to Oregon
JayVaughn Pinkston	22	F	6'7"	235	RS Senior	Brooklyn, NY	Graduated

=== Incoming transfers ===
Name	Number	Pos.	Height	Weight	Year	Hometown	Previous School
Eric Paschall	4	F	6'6"	205	Sophomore	Dobbs Ferry, NY	Transferred from Fordham. Under NCAA transfer rules, Paschall had to sit out the 2015–16 season. Will have three years of remaining eligibility.

=== Incoming recruits ===
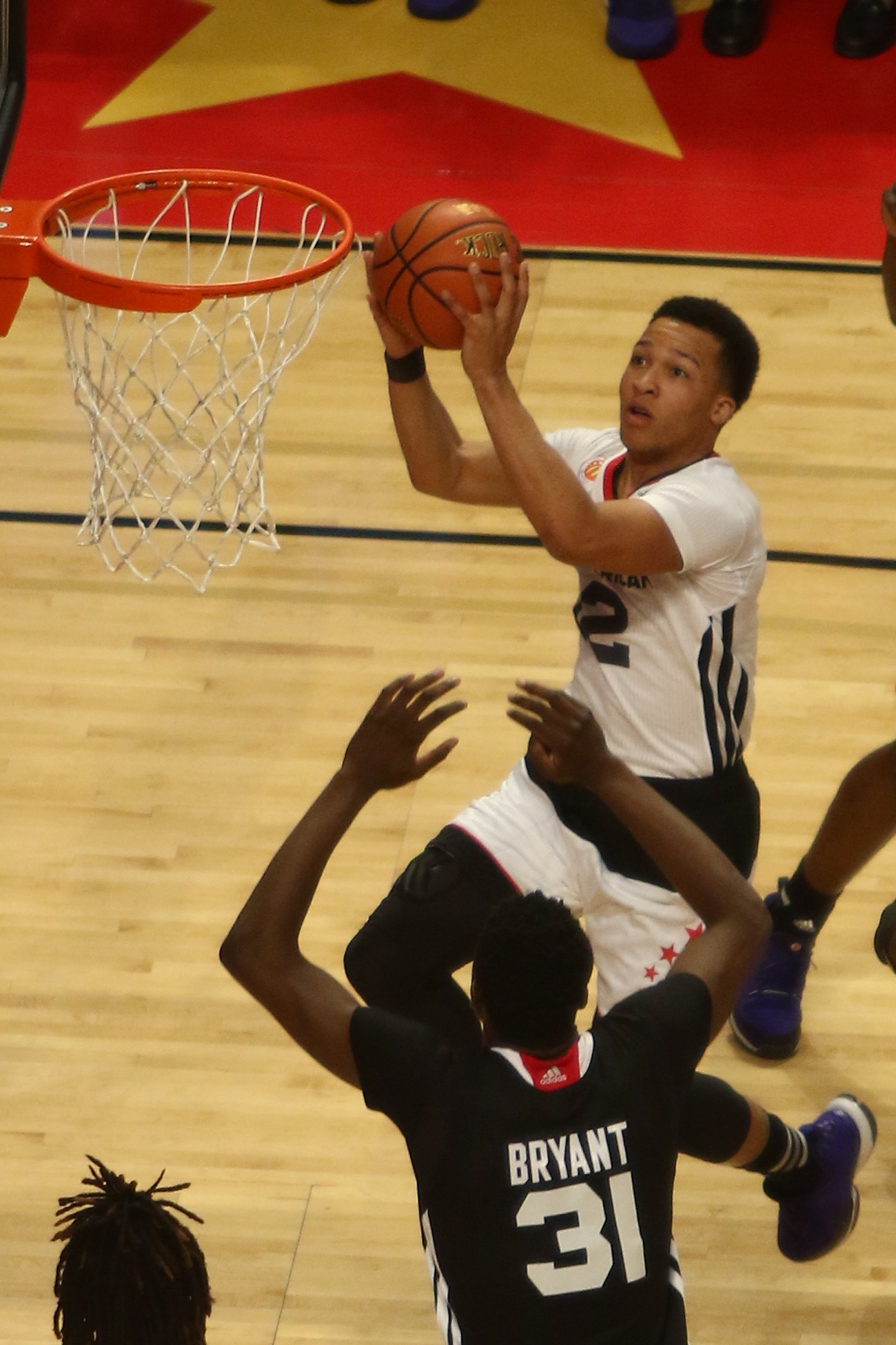
Jalen Brunson at the 2015 McDonald's All-American Boys Game

College recruiting information
Name	Hometown	School	Height	Weight	Commit date
Jalen Brunson; PG	Lincolnshire, IL	Adlai E. Stevenson High School	6 ft 1 in (1.85 m)	180 lb (82 kg)	Sep 10, 2014
Jalen Brunson; PG	Recruit ratings: Scout: Rivals: (90)				
Tim Delaney; PF	Mullica Hill, NJ	Pitman High School	6 ft 8 in (2.03 m)	220 lb (100 kg)	Jun 9, 2014
Tim Delaney; PF	Recruit ratings: Scout: Rivals: (80)				
Donte DiVincenzo; SG	Wilmington, DE	Salesianum School	6 ft 4 in (1.93 m)	170 lb (77 kg)	Jan 3, 2014
Donte DiVincenzo; SG	Recruit ratings: Scout: Rivals: (80)				
Overall recruit ranking:
Note: In many cases, Scout, Rivals, 247Sports, On3, and ESPN may conflict in their listings of height and weight.; In these cases, the average was taken. ESPN grades are on a 100-point scale.; Sources: "2015 Team Ranking". Rivals.

==== 2017 recruiting class ====
College recruiting information (2016)
Name	Hometown	School	Height	Weight	Commit date
Omari Spellman; PF	Malvern, PA	The MacDuffie School	6 ft 9 in (2.06 m)	272 lb (123 kg)	Feb 20, 2015
Omari Spellman; PF	Recruit ratings: Scout: Rivals: (83)				
Dylan Painter; C	Hershey, PA	The MacDuffie School	6 ft 9 in (2.06 m)	215 lb (98 kg)	Sep 16, 2015
Dylan Painter; C	Recruit ratings: Scout: Rivals: (78)				
Overall recruit ranking:
Note: In many cases, Scout, Rivals, 247Sports, On3, and ESPN may conflict in their listings of height and weight.; In these cases, the average was taken. ESPN grades are on a 100-point scale.; Sources: "2016 Team Ranking". Rivals.

== Roster ==
2015–16 Villanova Wildcats men's basketball team
Players
Coaches

Pos.	#	Name	Height	Weight	Year	Hometown
G	0	Henry Lowe (W)	5 ft 11 in (1.8 m)	185 lb (84 kg)	Sr	New York, New York
G	1	Jalen Brunson	6 ft 2 in (1.88 m)	199 lb (90 kg)	Fr	Lincolnshire, Illinois
F	2	Kris Jenkins	6 ft 6 in (1.98 m)	240 lb (109 kg)	Jr	Upper Marlboro, Maryland
G	3	Josh Hart	6 ft 5 in (1.96 m)	205 lb (93 kg)	Jr	Washington, D.C.
F	4	Eric Paschall	6 ft 7 in (2.01 m)	260 lb (118 kg)	So	Dobbs Ferry, New York
G	5	Phil Booth	6 ft 3 in (1.91 m)	185 lb (84 kg)	So	Baltimore, Maryland
G	10	Donte DiVincenzo	6 ft 5 in (1.96 m)	200 lb (91 kg)	Fr	Wilmington, Delaware
G	15	Ryan Arcidiacono	6 ft 3 in (1.91 m)	195 lb (88 kg)	Sr	Langhorne, Pennsylvania
F	20	Patrick Farrell (W)	6 ft 5 in (1.96 m)	200 lb (91 kg)	Sr	Rockville Centre, New York
F	23	Daniel Ochefu	6 ft 11 in (2.11 m)	245 lb (111 kg)	Sr	Lagos, Nigeria
G/F	25	Mikal Bridges	6 ft 7 in (2.01 m)	191 lb (87 kg)	RS Fr	Malvern, Pennsylvania
F	34	Tim Delaney	6 ft 9 in (2.06 m)	230 lb (104 kg)	Fr	Mullica Hill, New Jersey
F	45	Darryl Reynolds	6 ft 8 in (2.03 m)	225 lb (102 kg)	Jr	Philadelphia, Pennsylvania
F	52	Kevin Rafferty	6 ft 8 in (2.03 m)	215 lb (98 kg)	Sr	Malvern, Pennsylvania

Head coach

- Jay Wright (Bucknell)

Assistant coach(es)

- Baker Dunleavy (Villanova)
- Ashley Howard (Drexel)
- Kyle Neptune (Lehigh)

Legend

- (C) Team captain
- (S) Suspended
- (I) Ineligible
- (W) Walk-on
- Injured
- Current redshirt

Roster

== Schedule and results ==
Date time, TV	Rank^{#}	Opponent^{#}	Result	Record	Site (attendance) city, state
Exhibition
Nov 8, 2015*; 12:00 pm	No. 11	Pace	W 80–45		Wells Fargo Center; Philadelphia, PA
Regular season
Nov 13, 2015*; 7:00 pm, FS2	No. 11	Fairleigh Dickinson	W 91–54	1–0	The Pavilion (6,500); Villanova, PA
Nov 17, 2015*; 8:30 pm, FS1	No. 11	Nebraska; Gavitt Tipoff Games	W 87–63	2–0	The Pavilion (6,500); Villanova, PA
Nov 20, 2015*; 7:00 pm, FS2	No. 11	East Tennessee State; NIT Season Tip-Off	W 86–51	3–0	The Pavilion (6,500); Villanova, PA
Nov 22, 2015*; 4:30 pm, FS1	No. 11	Akron; NIT Season Tip-Off	W 75–56	4–0	The Pavilion (6,500); Villanova, PA
Nov 26, 2015*; 4:30 pm, ESPN2	No. 8	vs. Stanford; NIT Season Tip-Off semifinals	W 59–45	5–0	Barclays Center; Brooklyn, NY
Nov 27, 2015*; 3:00 pm, ESPN2	No. 8	vs. Georgia Tech; NIT Season Tip-Off championship	W 69–52	6–0	Barclays Center; Brooklyn, NY
Dec 1, 2015*; 7:00 pm, CBSSN	No. 8	at Saint Joseph's; Philadelphia Big 5/Holy War	W 86–72	7–0	Hagan Arena (4,200); Philadelphia, PA
Dec 7, 2015*; 7:00 pm, FS1	No. 9	vs. No. 7 Oklahoma; Pearl Harbor Classic	L 55–78	7–1	Bloch Arena (4,024); Honolulu, HI
Dec 13, 2015*; 5:00 pm, FS1	No. 9	La Salle; Philadelphia Big 5	W 76–47	8–1	The Pavilion (6,500); Villanova, PA
Dec 19, 2015*; 12:00 pm, ESPN2	No. 12	at No. 8 Virginia	L 75–86	8–2	John Paul Jones Arena (14,593); Charlottesville, VA
Dec 22, 2015*; 7:00 pm, FS1	No. 17	Delaware	W 78–48	9–2	The Pavilion (6,500); Villanova, PA
Dec 28, 2015*; 7:00 pm, FS1	No. 16	Penn; Philadelphia Big 5	W 77–57	10–2	The Pavilion (6,500); Villanova, PA
Dec 31, 2015; 12:00 pm, FS1	No. 16	No. 6 Xavier	W 95–64	11–2 (1–0)	The Pavilion (6,500); Villanova, PA
Jan 2, 2016; 10 pm, FS1	No. 16	at Creighton; Big East New Year's Marathon	W 85–71	12–2 (2–0)	CenturyLink Center (17,375); Omaha, NE
Jan 6, 2016; 7:00 pm, FS1	No. 11	Seton Hall	W 72–63	13–2 (3–0)	The Pavilion (6,500); Villanova, PA
Jan 10, 2016; 7:30 pm, FS1	No. 11	at No. 18 Butler	W 60–55	14–2 (4–0)	Hinkle Fieldhouse (9,144); Indianapolis, IN
Jan 13, 2016; 8:30 pm, FS1	No. 6	Marquette	W 83–68	15–2 (5–0)	The Pavilion (6,500); Villanova, PA
Jan 16, 2016; 1:00 pm, CBS	No. 6	at Georgetown	W 55–50	16–2 (6–0)	Verizon Center (15,535); Washington, D.C.
Jan 20, 2016; 9:00 pm, CBSSN	No. 4	at Seton Hall	W 72–71	17–2 (7–0)	Prudential Center (8,788); Newark, NJ
Jan 23, 2016; 12:00 pm, FOX	No. 4	No. 16 Providence	L 76–82 ^{OT}	17–3 (7–1)	Wells Fargo Center (7,191); Philadelphia, PA
Jan 31, 2016; 12:00 pm, FOX	No. 6	at St. John's	W 68–53	18–3 (8–1)	Madison Square Garden (12,713); New York, NY
Feb 3, 2016; 8:00 pm, CBSSN	No. 3	Creighton	W 83–58	19–3 (9–1)	The Pavilion (6,500); Villanova, PA
Feb 6, 2016; 2:30 pm, FS1	No. 3	at No. 11 Providence	W 72–60	20–3 (10–1)	Dunkin' Donuts Center (12,883); Providence, RI
Feb 9, 2016; 8:30 pm, FS1	No. 1	at DePaul	W 86–59	21–3 (11–1)	Allstate Arena (6,393); Rosemont, IL
Feb 13, 2016; 8:00 pm, CBSSN	No. 1	St. John's	W 73–63	22–3 (12–1)	Wells Fargo Center (18,052); Philadelphia, PA
Feb 17, 2016*; 7:00 pm, ESPN2	No. 1	at Temple; Philadelphia Big 5	W 83–67	23–3	Liacouras Center (10,472); Philadelphia, PA
Feb 20, 2016; 2:30 pm, FOX	No. 1	Butler	W 77–67	24–3 (13–1)	The Pavilion (6,500); Villanova, PA
Feb 24, 2016; 7:00 pm, FS1	No. 1	at No. 5 Xavier	L 83–90	24–4 (13–2)	Cintas Center (10,727); Cincinnati, OH
Feb 27, 2016; 2:00 pm, FOX	No. 1	at Marquette	W 89–79	25–4 (14–2)	BMO Harris Bradley Center (19,043); Milwaukee, WI
Mar 1, 2016; 7:00 pm, FS1	No. 3	DePaul	W 83–62	26–4 (15–2)	The Pavilion (6,500); Villanova, PA
Mar 5, 2016; 12:07 pm, FOX	No. 3	Georgetown; Homecoming	W 84–71	27–4 (16–2)	Wells Fargo Center (20,173); Philadelphia, PA
Big East tournament
Mar 10, 2016; 12:00 noon, FS1	(1) No. 3	vs. (8) Georgetown; Quarterfinals	W 81–67	28–4	Madison Square Garden (14,863); New York, NY
Mar 11, 2016; 6:30 pm, FS1	(1) No. 3	vs. (4) Providence; Semifinals	W 76–68	29–4	Madison Square Garden (17,130); New York, NY
Mar 12, 2016; 5:30 pm, FOX	(1) No. 3	vs. (3) Seton Hall; Championship	L 67–69	29–5	Madison Square Garden (19,812); New York, NY
NCAA tournament
Mar 18, 2016*; 12:40 pm, truTV	(2 S) No. 6	vs. (15 S) UNC Asheville; First Round	W 86–56	30–5	Barclays Center (17,333); Brooklyn, NY
Mar 20, 2016*; 12:10 pm, CBS	(2 S) No. 6	vs. (7 S) No. 25 Iowa; Second Round	W 87–68	31–5	Barclays Center (17,401); Brooklyn, NY
Mar 24, 2016*; 7:10 pm, CBS	(2 S) No. 6	vs. (3 S) No. 10 Miami (FL); Sweet Sixteen	W 92–69	32–5	KFC Yum! Center (19,399); Louisville, KY
Mar 26, 2016*; 8:49 pm, CBS	(2 S) No. 6	vs. (1 S) No. 1 Kansas; Elite Eight	W 64–59	33–5	KFC Yum! Center (19,422); Louisville, KY
Apr 2, 2016*; 6:09 pm, TBS	(2 S) No. 6	vs. (2 W) No. 7 Oklahoma; Final Four	W 95–51	34–5	NRG Stadium (75,505); Houston, TX
Apr 4, 2016*; 9:19 pm, TBS	(2 S) No. 6	vs. (1 E) No. 3 North Carolina; National Championship	W 77–74	35–5	NRG Stadium (74,340); Houston, TX
*Non-conference game. ^{#}Rankings from AP Poll. (#) Tournament seedings in parentheses. S=South Region. All times are in Eastern Time. W=West Region E=East Region.

== Local Radio ==
Station	Play–by–play	Color analyst	Studio host
WTEL–AM 610 and Villanova IMG Sports Network	Ryan Fannon	Whitey Rigsby	Joe Weil

== Rankings ==
On February 8, the Wildcats became the first Villanova Wildcats men's basketball team to reach number one in the AP Poll.

Ranking movements Legend: ██ Increase in ranking ██ Decrease in ranking т = Tied with team above or below ( ) = First-place votes
	Week																			
Poll	Pre	1	2	3	4	5	6	7	8	9	10	11	12	13	14	15	16	17	18	Final
AP	11	11	8	8	9	12	17	16	11	6	4	6	3	1 (32)	1 (44)	1 (45)	3	3	6	Not released
Coaches	9	8т	9	7	6	13	17	16	13	7	4	6	4	1 (11)	1 (25)	1 (25)	2	2	6	1 (30)

*AP does not release post-NCAA tournament rankings
