= Phil Booth (basketball) =

American basketball player (born 1995)

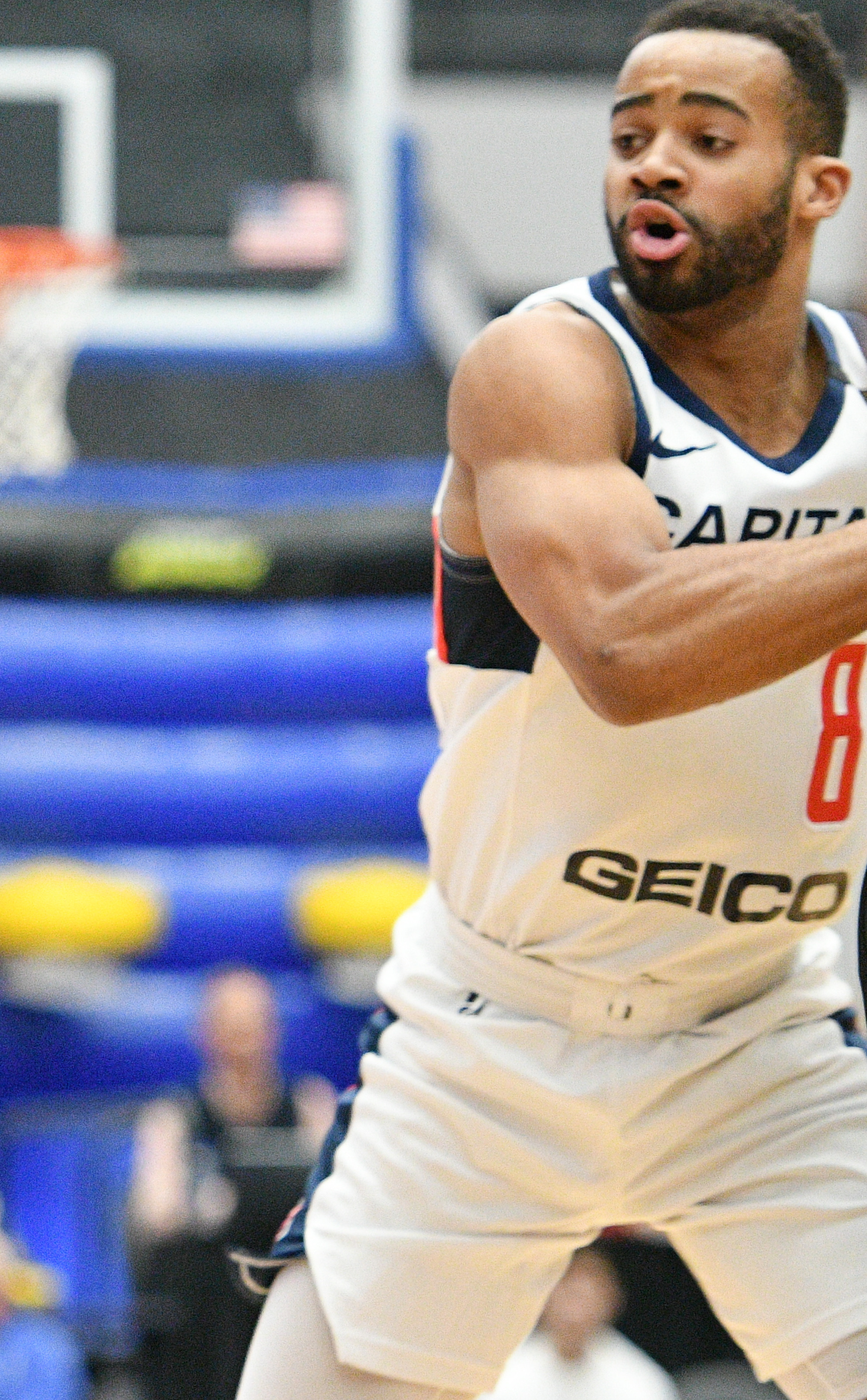
- Booth in 2020

Minnesota Timberwolves
- Title: Basketball operations associate
- League: NBA

Personal information
- Born: December 31, 1995 (age 30) Baltimore, Maryland, U.S.
- Listed height: 6 ft 3.5 in (1.92 m)
- Listed weight: 190 lb (86 kg)

Career information
- High school: Mount Saint Joseph (Baltimore, Maryland)
- College: Villanova (2014–2019)
- NBA draft: 2019: undrafted
- Playing career: 2019–2025
- Position: Point guard / shooting guard

Career history
- 2019–2020: Capital City Go-Go
- 2021: Oklahoma City Blue
- 2021–2022: Oostende
- 2022: Budućnost VOLI
- 2022–2023: Petkim Spor
- 2023–2024: SIG Strasbourg
- 2024: Vanoli Cremona
- 2024–2025: JDA Dijon

Career highlights
- Belgian League champion (2022); 2× NCAA champion (2016, 2018); First-team All-Big East (2019); Big East tournament MVP (2019); Robert V. Geasey Trophy (2019)
- Stats at Basketball Reference

Phillip Imani Booth III (born December 31, 1995) is an American former professional basketball player. He played college basketball for the Villanova Wildcats.

== High school career ==
Booth played high school basketball at Mount Saint Joseph in Baltimore. While there, Booth was selected as the 2013–14 Baltimore Prep Player of the Year. He was also a first team All-Catholic league selection. Phil holds the record for most points at Mount Saint Joseph High School.

== College career ==
Booth entered Villanova as a freshman during the 2014–15 season. He immediately contributed to team, and at the end of the seasons was named the Philadelphia Big Five rookie of the year.

During his sophomore year, Booth continued to contribute during the 2015–16 season in important situations. He scored a team high 20 points in the National Championship game victory over North Carolina. He hit two free throws with 35 seconds left in the game. Booth averaged 7.0 points per game that season.

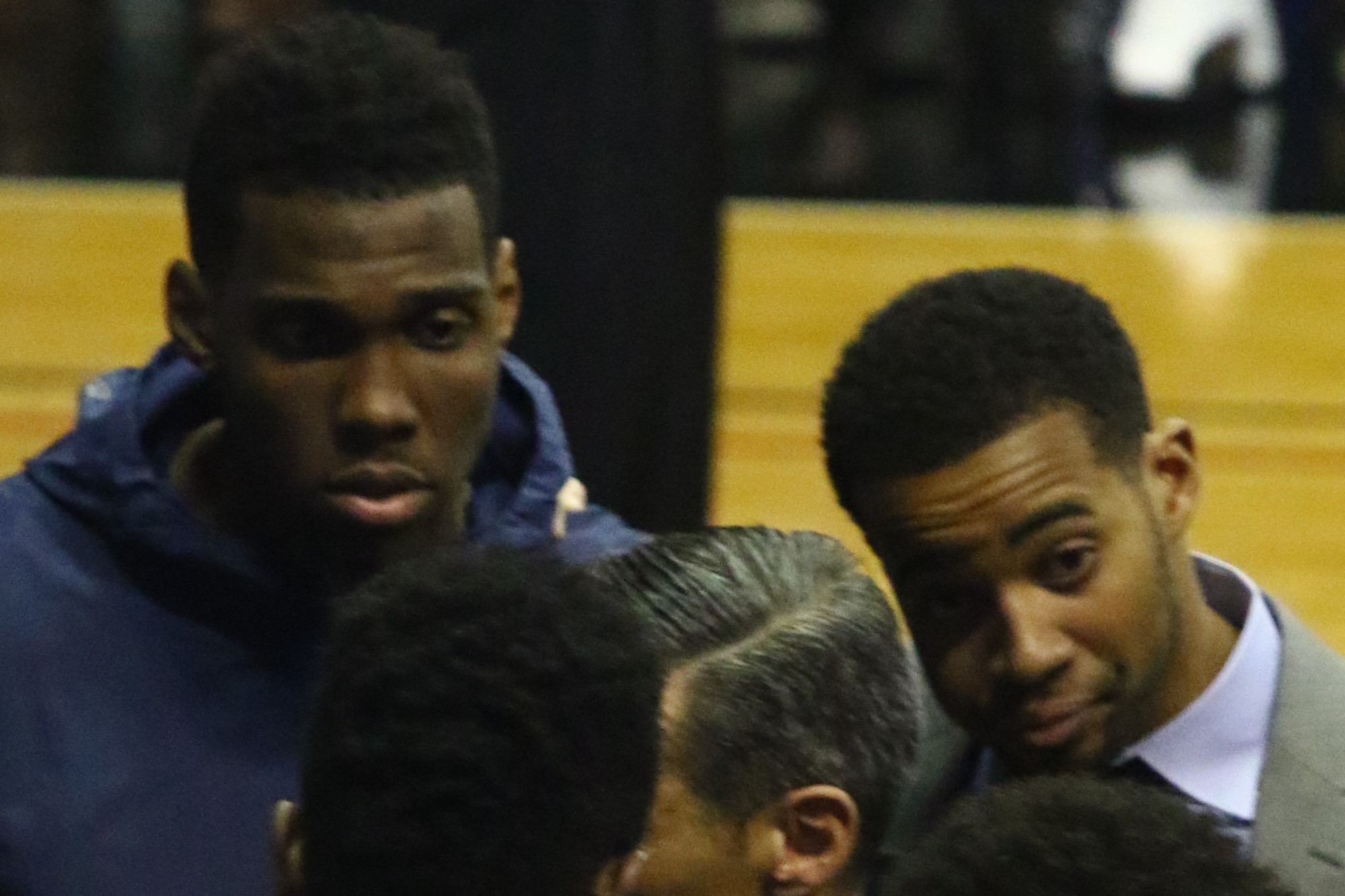
Sidelined players during 2016–17 Villanova Wildcats men's basketball team huddle, including Booth (right)

In his junior year, he was limited to three games and was forced to redshirt due to lingering knee pain.

Booth suffered further injury as a redshirt junior, as he fractured his right hand in a game against Providence on January 23, 2018. He returned on February 21 in a 93–62 win over DePaul and scored 14 points off the bench. After the injury Booth acknowledged that his offensive rhythm was disrupted by the injury so he shot less but remained a starter. In his redshirt junior season Booth won the championship with Villanova for the second time in his career.

As a senior, Booth averaged 18.6 points, 3.9 rebounds, and 3.8 assists per game. He finished his career as the ninth player in Villanova history with 1,500 points and 300 assists, and he played in a school-record 148 games.

== Professional career ==
After going undrafted in the 2019 NBA draft, Booth joined the Cleveland Cavaliers for the 2019 NBA Summer League. On July 26, 2019, Booth signed an Exhibit 10 contract with the Washington Wizards, but was waived by the Wizards on October 16.

On October 27, 2019, Booth was included in roster of the Capital City Go-Go. On January 4, 2020, he scored 22 points and had four rebounds in a loss to the Fort Wayne Mad Ants.

On February 16, 2021, the Oklahoma City Blue announced that they had acquired Booth. In six games, he averaged 8.7 points, 2.3 rebounds, and 2.2 assists per game.

On June 16, 2021, Booth signed with Oostende of the Belgian BNXT League. Oostende also plays in the Basketball Champions League.

On July 14, 2022, Booth signed with Budućnost VOLI of the Montenegrin First League, the ABA League and the EuroCup.

On December 31, 2022, Booth signed with Petkim Spor of the Basketbol Süper Ligi (BSL).

On June 14, 2023, Booth signed with SIG Strasbourg of the French LNB Pro A.

On July 25, 2024, Booth signed with Vanoli Cremona of the Italian Lega Basket Serie A (LBA).

On November 25, 2024, Booth signed with JDA Dijon of the LNB Pro A.

== Post-playing career ==
On September 25, 2026, the Minnesota Timberwolves hired Booth to serve as the team's scouting coordinator.

== Personal life ==
Booth's father, Phil Booth Sr., played college basketball at Coppin State from 1987 to 1990.
