= 2016 NCAA Division I men's basketball championship game =

American college basketball final

2016 NCAA tournament championship game
National championship game
Villanova Wildcats	North Carolina Tar Heels
Big East	ACC
(34–5)	(33–6)
77	74
Head coach: Jay Wright	Head coach: Roy Williams
- AP: 6
- Coaches: 6
- AP: 3
- Coaches: 3
	1st half	2nd half	Total
Villanova Wildcats	34	43	77
North Carolina Tar Heels	39	35	74
- Date: April 4, 2016
- Venue: NRG Stadium, Houston, Texas
- MVP: Ryan Arcidiacono, Villanova
- Favorite: North Carolina by 2
- Referees: Michael Stephens, John Higgins, Terry Wymer
- Attendance: 74,340
- National anthem: Generald Wilson

United States TV coverage
- Network: TBS; TNT and truTV (Team Stream)
- Announcers: Jim Nantz, Bill Raftery, Grant Hill, and Tracy Wolfson (TBS); Wes Durham, Brendan Haywood, and Dwayne Ballen (North Carolina Team Stream - TNT); Scott Graham, Brian Finneran, and Kacie McDonnell (Villanova Team Stream - truTV)
- Nielsen Ratings: 12.0 (17.8 million)

The 2016 NCAA Division I men's basketball championship game was the final game of the 2016 NCAA Division I men's basketball tournament and determined the national champion for the 2015–16 NCAA Division I men's basketball season. The game was played on Monday, April 4, 2016, at NRG Stadium in Houston, Texas, between the Villanova Wildcats and the North Carolina Tar Heels.

The first half was closely fought, with neither team leading by more than five points in the first 19 minutes. After North Carolina briefly took a seven-point lead in the final minute, a field goal by Phil Booth for Villanova cut the lead to 39–34 at the break. Villanova started to gain the upper hand in the second half, taking their largest lead of the game, 67–57, with 4:47 remaining. North Carolina then surged back, setting up a heroic comeback in the final minutes. With just over 1:30 remaining, Marcus Paige hit a three pointer to cut the lead to three points. After Villanova turned over the ball, Brice Johnson cut the lead to one point. Booth was fouled and hit two free throws to retake a three-point lead. With 13 seconds remaining, the lead was again three points for Villanova. On the ensuing possession, Paige sunk an off-balance three-point field goal to tie the game with 4.7 seconds left. However, Ryan Arcidiacono found Kris Jenkins for a buzzer-beating, championship-winning three-point shot, with Villanova defeating North Carolina by a final score of 77–74. It was Villanova's second title overall, and first since 1985. Jenkins's buzzer beater is considered to be one of the greatest shots in NCAA tournament history.

== Participants ==
=== Villanova Wildcats ===
After a 27–4 regular season and winning the 2016 Big East Conference regular season championship, Villanova beat Georgetown and Providence en route to the 2016 Big East tournament finals, where they would lose to Seton Hall. They were the #2 seed in the South Regional of the 2016 NCAA Tournament.

Villanova cruised past UNC Asheville in the first round of the tournament with an 86–56 victory. In the second round, Villanova routed Iowa by a score of 87–68 to reach the Sweet 16 for the first time since 2009. In the South Regional semifinals, Villanova blew out Miami by a score of 92–69. In the South regional Final, with Villanova leading 62–59, Mikal Bridges made a steal before Frank Mason III could shoot a potential game-tying three-pointer, and Jalen Brunson made the ensuing free throws and Villanova beat the #1-overall seed Kansas 64–59 to advance to the Final Four for the first time since 2009. In the Final Four, Villanova defeated Oklahoma, 95–51, the largest margin of victory in Final Four history, to advance to the national championship game for the first time since their 1985 National Championship run. The game also featured the second-best shooting percentage in a Final Four game, behind only Villanova's 1985 Championship Game performance of 78.6% (22-for-28).

=== North Carolina Tar Heels ===
After a 25–6 regular season and winning the 2016 ACC regular season championship, North Carolina beat Pittsburgh, Notre Dame, and Virginia en route to the ACC tournament championship. They were rewarded with the top seed in the East Regional of the 2016 NCAA Tournament.

North Carolina opened the tournament with an 83–67 win over Florida Gulf Coast, outscoring FGCU 42–27 in the second half. North Carolina would again use a big second half to beat Providence, 85–66, in the second round, outscoring the Friars 51–36 in the second half to advance to the Sweet 16. In the Sweet 16, Marcus Paige would have 21 points and Brice Johnson would have 20 points to power UNC to a 101–86 victory over Indiana. In the Elite Eight, North Carolina beat fellow ACC foe Notre Dame, 88–74, to advance to an NCAA Tournament-record 19th Final Four. In the Final Four, North Carolina beat another ACC foe, Syracuse, 83–66, to make their 10th appearance in the National Title game in hopes of winning their sixth national title. UNC became one of only four schools to do so, along with Duke, UCLA, and Kentucky.

== Starting lineups ==
Villanova	Position		North Carolina
Jalen Brunson	G		Joel Berry II
Ryan Arcidiacono	G		Marcus Paige
Josh Hart	G	F	† Brice Johnson
Kris Jenkins	F	G/F	Justin Jackson
Daniel Ochefu	F		Kennedy Meeks
† 2016 Consensus First Team All-American

== Game summary ==
TBS
TNT
truTV

Monday, April 4, 2016
8:19 pm CDT

Box Score

#S2 Villanova Wildcats 77, #E1 North Carolina Tar Heels 74
Scoring by half: 34–39, 43–35
Pts: Phil Booth 20; Rebs: Josh Hart 8 Asts: Ryan Arcidiacono, Daniel Ochefu 2	Pts: Marcus Paige 21; Rebs: Brice Johnson 8 Asts: Marcus Paige 6

NRG Stadium, Houston, Texas
Attendance: 74,340
Referees: Michael Stephens, John Higgins, Terry Wymer

The first half of the National Championship game was tightly fought, with neither team taking a lead larger than five points in the first 19 minutes. In the last minute of the half, North Carolina briefly went up by seven points, and had a chance to go up by nine. However, Villanova's Josh Hart blocked a layup attempt, which led to a Phil Booth jump shot at the other end of the court, cutting the deficit to 39–34 as the clock expired. At halftime, Joel Berry II of the Tar Heels led all players with 15 points. Despite entering the game ranked only 294th out of all 351 Division I teams in three-point shooting, North Carolina hit seven of their nine three-point attempt in the first half. However, the Tar Heels hit just 32% of their two-point attempts. Villanova had the edge in points the paint by an 18–12 margin, connecting on 65% on their two-point shots. The Tar Heels led in fast break points by a 10–2 margin and collected five offensive rebounds compared to only one for Villanova. Villanova's Kris Jenkins played just four minutes in the half after getting into early foul trouble.

After the halftime break, Villanova went on a 13–2 run and reclaimed the lead. With 6:13 left in the second half, Ryan Arcidiacono of the Wildcats hit a three-point field goal to give his team a lead of six points. With 4:47 to go, Villanova was up by a game-high 10 points, leading 67–57. However, North Carolina fought back with two straight field goals. With 1:38 remaining, Villanova led 70–64 before Marcus Paige of the Tar Heels hit a three-pointer to cut the lead in half. After a Villanova turnover, Brice Johnson hit a bank shot to cut the Wildcats' lead to one point. Phil Booth of the Wildcats was fouled by Isaiah Hicks with 35.7 seconds left. He hit both free throws to put the lead back to three points. Paige missed a layup attempt on the ensuing possession, but North Carolina got the rebound and Paige made a reverse layup to cut the lead back to one. Villanova's Josh Hart was then fouled and hit both free throws.

Down by three points, North Carolina tied the game on an "unbelievable" double-clutch three-pointer by Paige with 4.7 seconds remaining. After the game, North Carolina Coach Roy Williams remarked "he turned a broken play into a great play". Villanova then called a time-out to set up their final play, one that they had practiced "every single day" during the season, called "Nova". After receiving the in-bounds pass, Arcidiacono passed with less than two seconds to Jenkins, who hit a game-winning, buzzer-beating three-point shot. It was the first buzzer-beating shot to win an NCAA men's national title since Lorenzo Charles' dunk for North Carolina State University in 1983, and the first title game ever to end on a buzzer-beating three-pointer. "Kris Jenkins lives for that moment", remarked his coach Jay Wright.

Paige finished with a game-high 21 points and a game-high 6 assists for North Carolina. Berry added 20 points for the Tar Heels and Johnson scored 14 while collecting a game-high 8 rebounds. Booth came off the bench to lead Villanova with a career-high 20 points. Arcidiacono scored 16, Jenkins added 14, and Hart had 12 points and 8 rebounds. As a team, Villanova finished 28 of 48 from the field (58%) and 8 of 14 from three (57%). North Carolina made 11 of 17 three-point attempts (65%) and was 27 of 63 overall (43%). The Tar Heels won the rebounding battle 33–23, including 14 offensive rebounds to just two for Villanova. The teams combined for just 21 turnovers.

It was Villanova's second NCAA championship. Their first championship was in the 1985 Championship Game, when they defeated the Georgetown Hoyas in what is often considered one of the greatest upsets of all time. Rollie Massimino, the head coach of the 1985 Wildcats, was on hand to watch the 2016 Championship Game. The Wildcats finished the tournament with the third-largest average margin of victory in tournament history, behind the 1996 Kentucky team and the 2024 UConn team.

== Broadcast calls on the final shot ==
Nantz: Villanova trying to go the length of the court, with Arcidiacono. Three seconds at midcourt!
Hill: Watch Jenkins.
Nantz: Gives it to Jenkins! [time expires] For the championship... YES!
Raftery: [overlapping Nantz, voice breaking] OHHHHHHHHHHHHHH!
Nantz: Villanova! Phenomenal! The national champions, with Jenkins hitting the winner at the buzzer!

— TBS' Jim Nantz, Grant Hill and Bill Raftery calling Jenkins' game-winning shot,

McDonough: They'll have to get it in with no timeouts left; they do, Arcidiacono... Arcidiacono...
Vitale: Oh, they'll finish it! [time expires]
McDonough: ...off to Jenkins... [over Vitale reacting] FOR THE WIN! NATIONAL CHAMPIONSHIP FOR VILLANOVA!

— ESPN International's Sean McDonough and Dick Vitale calling the shot,

4.7 seconds to go, inbound to Ryan Arcidiacono! At half-court with three seconds. Ryan Arcidiacono flips to Jenkins! [time expires] Three, for the win... IT'S GOOD! IT'S GOOD! Jenkins hits the three to win the national championship! For the first time in 31 years, you can call the 'Cats champions, off the Jenkins three at the buzzer!

— Westwood One's Kevin Kugler calling the game-winning shot,

Durham: Into Ryan Arcidiacono; he'll come front court. Looks for Jenkins; a three [time expires] at the horn...
Haywood: Oh no. Oh no.

— Wes Durham and Brendan Haywood calling the shot for TNT's North Carolina "Team Stream",

Gets it in to Arcidiacono. Comes to the middle. Arcidiacono [time expires] to a trailing Jenkins... for the championship! He hits it at the buzzer!

— North Carolina radio announcer Jones Angell calling the shot on the Tar Heel Sports Network,

Graham: Arcidiacono... ball in his hands! Arcidiacono... for Jenkins, [time expires] for the win! YES! [Finneran celebrates behind him] YES! YES! YES!
Finneran: ARCHIE... TO JENKINS FOR THREE, AND THE WIN!
Graham: NATIONAL CHAMPIONS! NATIONAL CHAMPIONS!

— Scott Graham and Brian Finneran calling the shot for truTV's Villanova "Team Stream",

Three seconds to go; across the timeline. Two seconds to go! Jenkins; three right wing [time expires] to win it... HE MADE IT! HE MADE THE THREE FROM THE RIGHT WING, AT THE BUZZER! 'CATS WIN IT ALL! 'CATS WIN IT ALL! 'CATS WIN IT ALL! 31 YEARS LATER, VILLANOVA IS THE KING OF COLLEGE BASKETBALL ONCE AGAIN!

— Villanova IMG Sports Network radio announcer Ryan Fannon calling the shot,

== Reactions ==
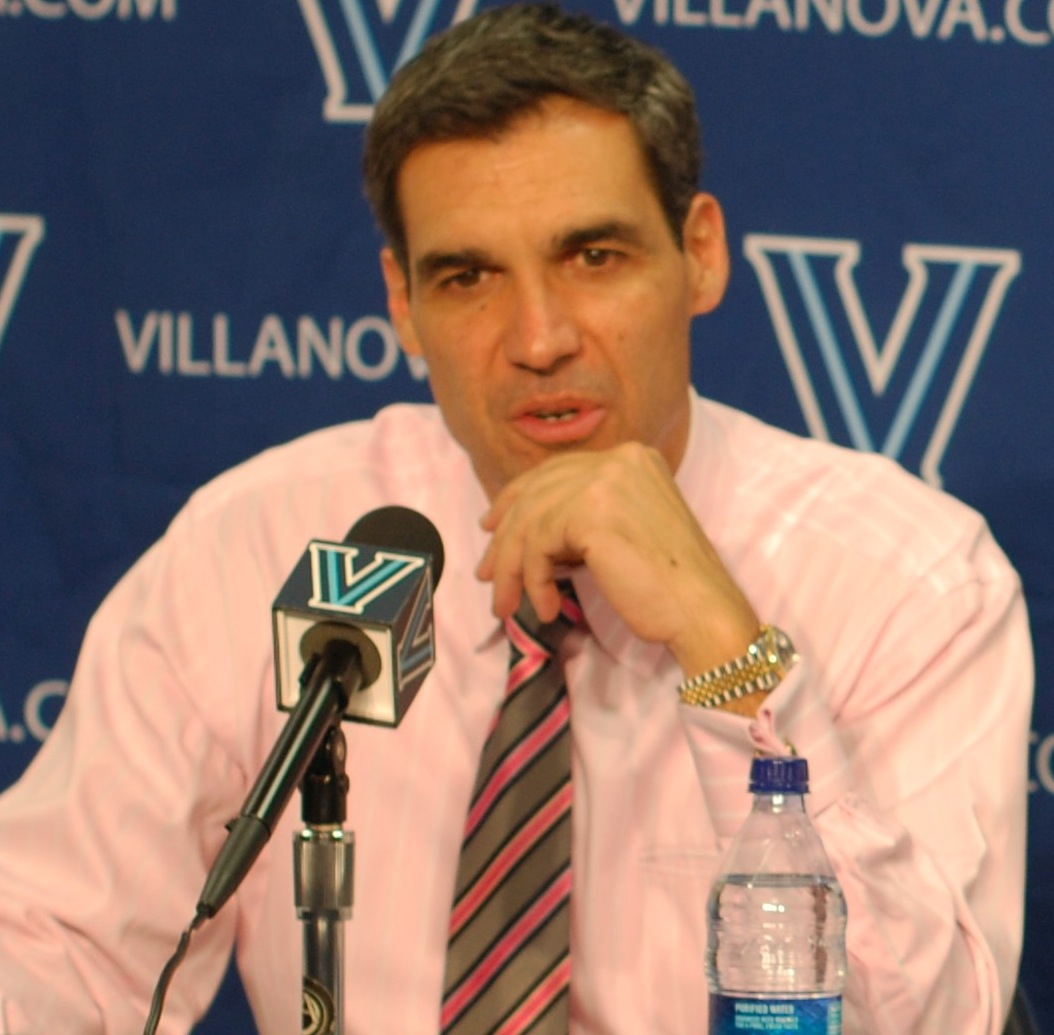
Villanova coach Jay Wright called the victory "one of the greatest college basketball games we've ever been a part of".

In his post-game press conference, Jay Wright remarked, "That was one of the greatest college basketball games we've ever been a part of. I just couldn't be prouder, couldn't be happier to see them fulfill this. This is what it's all about as a coach". He added, "I can’t wait to see that look (on my face), because I was just shocked" by the final play. "We beat a class program. Great coach and great team. We have a lot of respect for North Carolina". Roy Williams, who was in tears after the game, described his reaction as the final shot went in: "It was helpless. It was not a good feeling". He added, "I'm not very good because I can't take away the hurt ... I told them I loved them. I told them I wish I could have helped them more".

CBS sportswriter Matt Norlander described the game as "a thrilling, undeniably heart-stopping, instant classic of a title game". ESPN staff writer Eamonn Brennan also called the game an "instant classic" and said both teams "were flying around the floor, playing high-level, pinpoint basketball and trading great plays". The Associated Press called the final basket "as memorable as any [points] that have been scored in the history of this tournament".

Writing for USA Today, Nicole Auerbach called Villanova's performance "one of the most improbable and offensively insane NCAA tournament runs", ending with "one of the most thrilling championship games in tournament history". Villanova's championship win was so unexpected that more contestants in ESPN's Tournament Challenge bracket contest picked Villanova to lose in the first round than picked them to win the championship.

In response to the historic win and to combat absenteeism the following day, classes at Villanova were cancelled.

== Media coverage ==
The National Championship game was broadcast in the United States by TBS, marking the first time that the national championship game aired exclusively on pay television, and ending a 34-year run on CBS (CBS and TBS will alternate broadcasting the championship game every other year through 2024; thus, the game returned to CBS for 2017). TBS's sister channels TNT and TruTV aired special broadcasts of the game known as Team Stream powered by Bleacher Report, which featured commentators representing the two participating teams. These special telecasts had been used for the Final Four since they moved to TBS in 2014, but this marked the first time they were used for the national championship. On the main broadcast, Jim Nantz was on play-by-play, with Bill Raftery and Grant Hill providing on-court commentary. Tracy Wolfson was the on-court reporter. Craig Sager was also on hand, as he interviewed former North Carolina guard, Chicago Bulls legend, and Basketball Hall of Famer Michael Jordan, who was in attendance. Greg Gumbel and Ernie Johnson served as the pregame hosts. Charles Barkley, Seth Davis, Reggie Miller, Clark Kellogg, Kenny Smith and Steve Smith provided commentary. TNT's "Team Stream", focusing on North Carolina, was called by Wes Durham with analyst Brendan Haywood and sideline reporter Dwayne Ballen, while on truTV's "Team Stream", which focused on Villanova, Scott Graham called the game with analyst Brian Finneran and sideline reporter Kacie McDonnell. When it was first revealed that TBS would air this game, some concerns arose as to whether the traditional closing song, One Shining Moment, would be used due to its association with CBS, but TBS eventually played it to end the telecast, and continues to do so when it has the broadcasting rights to the Final Four and national championship.

ESPN International owned the international broadcast rights. Sean McDonough served as the play-by-play announcer for the international audience, with Dick Vitale providing commentary. In Canada, the game aired on TSN.

Radio coverage in the United States was provided by Westwood One, with Kevin Kugler calling the game. The Championship Game was also streamed live on NCAA.com free of charge.

With the switch from broadcast television to cable television, ratings in the United States sharply declined from the 2015 title contest between Duke and Wisconsin. The three cable channels airing the game, TBS, TNT and TruTV, had a combined broadcast average of 17.8 million viewers. That total is down from the 28.3 million who watched the previous year's Championship Game, which aired exclusively on CBS.
