= 2015–16 North Carolina Tar Heels men's basketball team =

American college basketball season

2015–16 North Carolina Tar Heels men's basketball

NCAA tournament, Runner-up ACC tournament champions ACC regular season champions CBE Hall of Fame Classic champions

National Championship Game, L 74–77 vs. Villanova
- Conference: Atlantic Coast Conference

Ranking
- Coaches: No. 2
- AP: No. 3
- Record: 33–7 (14–4 ACC)
- Head coach: Roy Williams (13th season)
- Assistant coaches: Steve Robinson (13th season); C. B. McGrath (13th season); Hubert Davis (4th season)
- Home arena: Dean E. Smith Center

2015–16 ACC men's basketball standings
	Conf.				Overall
Team	W		L	PCT	W		L	PCT
No. 3 North Carolina †	14	–	4	.778	33	–	7	.825
No. 4 Virginia	13	–	5	.722	29	–	8	.784
No. 10 Miami (FL)	13	–	5	.722	27	–	8	.771
No. 16 Louisville*	12	–	6	.667	23	–	8	.742
Notre Dame	11	–	7	.611	24	–	12	.667
No. 19 Duke	11	–	7	.611	25	–	11	.694
Virginia Tech	10	–	8	.556	20	–	15	.571
Clemson	10	–	8	.556	17	–	14	.548
Pittsburgh	9	–	9	.500	21	–	12	.636
Syracuse	9	–	9	.500	23	–	14	.622
Georgia Tech	8	–	10	.444	21	–	15	.583
Florida State	8	–	10	.444	20	–	14	.588
NC State	5	–	13	.278	16	–	17	.485
Wake Forest	2	–	16	.111	11	–	20	.355
Boston College	0	–	18	.000	7	–	25	.219
† 2016 ACC tournament winner * Ineligible for both the 2016 ACC tournament and the 2016 NCAA tournament due to self-imposed postseason ban. Rankings from AP poll

The 2015–16 North Carolina Tar Heels men's basketball team represented the University of North Carolina at Chapel Hill during the 2015–16 NCAA Division I men's basketball season. The team's head coach was Roy Williams, who was in his 13th season as UNC's men's basketball head coach. The Tar Heels played their home games at the Dean Smith Center and were members of the Atlantic Coast Conference. North Carolina finished the season with a 33–7 record, 14–4 to win the ACC regular season championship. The Tar Heels defeated Virginia to win the ACC tournament. They received an automatic bid to the NCAA tournament as a #1 seed. There, they defeated Florida Gulf Coast, Providence, Indiana, and Notre Dame to earn a trip to the Final Four, the school's 19th trip to the Final Four. In a matchup against fellow ACC foe, Syracuse, the Tar Heels won easily to advance to the National Championship against Villanova. North Carolina, despite a circus shot by Marcus Paige to tie the game at 74 with less than five seconds remaining, lost on a last second three pointer by Kris Jenkins.

== Previous season ==
The Tar Heels finished the 2014–15 season 26–12, 11–7 in ACC play to finish in fifth place. They advanced to the championship game of the ACC tournament where they lost to Notre Dame. They received an at-large bid to the NCAA tournament where they defeated Harvard and Arkansas before losing in the Sweet Sixteen to eventual National Runner-Up Wisconsin.

== Departures ==
Name	Number	Pos.	Height	Weight	Year	Hometown	Notes
Luke Davis	4	G	6'0"	178	RS Senior	Raleigh, NC	Graduated
J. P. Tokoto	13	F	6'6"	200	Junior	Menomonee Falls, WI	Declared for 2015 NBA draft
Desmond Hubert	14	F	6'10"	225	Senior	Cream Ridge, NJ	Graduated
Jackson Simmons	21	F	6'7"	225	Senior	Webster, NC	Graduated
Sasha Seymore	24	F	6'6"	220	Senior	New Bern, NC	Graduated

== Class of 2015 signees ==
College recruiting information
Name	Hometown	School	Height	Weight	Commit date
Kenny Williams; SG	Chesterfield, VA	Lloyd C. Bird High School	6 ft 3 in (1.91 m)	175 lb (79 kg)	May 2, 2015
Kenny Williams; SG	Recruit ratings: Scout: Rivals: 247Sports: ESPN:				
Luke Maye; PF	Huntersville, NC	Hough High School	6 ft 8 in (2.03 m)	230 lb (100 kg)	Nov 11, 2014
Luke Maye; PF	Recruit ratings: Scout: Rivals: 247Sports: ESPN:				
Overall recruit ranking:
Note: In many cases, Scout, Rivals, 247Sports, On3, and ESPN may conflict in their listings of height and weight.; In these cases, the average was taken. ESPN grades are on a 100-point scale.; Sources: "2015 Team Ranking". Rivals.

== Roster ==
2015–16 North Carolina Tar Heels men's basketball team
Players
Coaches

Pos.	#	Name	Height	Weight	Year	Previous school	Hometown
G	0	Nate Britt	6 ft 1 in (1.85 m)	175 lb (79 kg)	Jr	Oak Hill Academy	Upper Marlboro, Maryland
G/F	1	Theo Pinson	6 ft 6 in (1.98 m)	205 lb (93 kg)	So	Wesleyan Christian Academy	Greensboro, North Carolina
G	2	Joel Berry II	6 ft 0 in (1.83 m)	195 lb (88 kg)	So	Lake Highland Prep	Apopka, Florida
F	3	Kennedy Meeks	6 ft 10 in (2.08 m)	260 lb (118 kg)	Jr	West Charlotte	Charlotte, North Carolina
F	4	Isaiah Hicks	6 ft 9 in (2.06 m)	235 lb (107 kg)	Jr	J.F. Webb	Oxford, North Carolina
G	5	Marcus Paige (C)	6 ft 2 in (1.88 m)	175 lb (79 kg)	Sr	Linn-Mar	Marion, Iowa
F	11	Brice Johnson	6 ft 10 in (2.08 m)	230 lb (104 kg)	Sr	Edisto	Orangeburg, South Carolina
G	13	Kanler Coker (W)	6 ft 4 in (1.93 m)	200 lb (91 kg)	Jr	North/Flowery Branch	Gainesville, Florida
G	24	Kenny Williams	6 ft 4 in (1.93 m)	175 lb (79 kg)	Fr	L.C. Bird	Midlothian, Virginia
G	30	Stilman White	6 ft 1 in (1.85 m)	175 lb (79 kg)	RS Jr	Hoggard	Wilmington, North Carolina
G	31	Justin Coleman (W)	6 ft 1 in (1.85 m)	185 lb (84 kg)	Sr	Broughton	Raleigh, North Carolina
F	32	Luke Maye	6 ft 7 in (2.01 m)	230 lb (104 kg)	Fr	Hough	Huntersville, North Carolina
F	34	Toby Egbuna (W)	6 ft 4 in (1.93 m)	225 lb (102 kg)	Sr	West Forsyth High School	Clemmons, North Carolina
F	42	Joel James	6 ft 11 in (2.11 m)	280 lb (127 kg)	Sr	Dwyer	West Palm Beach, Florida
G	43	Spenser Dalton (W)	6 ft 3 in (1.91 m)	215 lb (98 kg)	Sr	Christ School	Asheville, North Carolina
G/F	44	Justin Jackson	6 ft 8 in (2.03 m)	200 lb (91 kg)	So	Homeschool Christian Youth Ass.	Tomball, Texas

Head coach

- Roy Williams (North Carolina)

Assistant coach(es)

- Steve Robinson (Radford)
- C. B. McGrath (Kansas)
- Hubert Davis (North Carolina)

Legend

- (C) Team captain
- (S) Suspended
- (I) Ineligible
- (W) Walk-on
- Injured
- Current redshirt

Roster

== Schedule and results ==
Date time, TV	Rank^{#}	Opponent^{#}	Result	Record	High points	High rebounds	High assists	Site (attendance) city, state
Exhibition
Nov 6, 2015*; 7:30 pm	No. 1	Guilford	W 99–49		14 – Tied	7 – Tied	9 – Britt	Dean Smith Center (11,295); Chapel Hill, NC
Non-conference regular season
Nov 13, 2015*; 7:00 pm, CBSSN	No. 1	vs. Temple; Veterans Classic	W 91–67	1–0	25 – Meeks	11 – Meeks	5 – Pinson	Alumni Hall (5,710); Annapolis, MD
Nov 15, 2015*; 4:00 pm, ESPNU	No. 1	Fairfield; CBE Hall of Fame Classic	W 92–65	2–0	17 – Britt	12 – Meeks	8 – Pinson	Dean Smith Center (13,178); Chapel Hill, NC
Nov 18, 2015*; 7:00 pm, RSN	No. 1	Wofford; CBE Hall of Fame Classic	W 78–58	3–0	16 – Tied	14 – Johnson	4 – Tied	Dean Smith Center (12,095); Chapel Hill, NC
Nov 21, 2015*; 2:00 pm, ESPN3	No. 1	at Northern Iowa	L 67–71	3–1	22 – Johnson	9 – Johnson	5 – Paige	McLeod Center (7,018); Cedar Falls, IA
Nov 23, 2015*; 9:30 pm, ESPN2	No. 9	vs. Northwestern; CBE Hall of Fame Classic; Semifinal	W 80–69	4–1	21 – Jackson	13 – Jackson	8 – Pinson	Sprint Center (13,598); Kansas City, MO
Nov 24, 2015*; 10:00 pm, ESPN2	No. 9	vs. Kansas State; CBE Hall of Fame Classic; Championship	W 80–70	5–1	27 – Jackson	7 – Meeks	9 – Paige	Sprint Center (13,198); Kansas City, MO
Dec 1, 2015*; 9:30 pm, ESPN	No. 9	No. 2 Maryland; ACC–Big Ten Challenge	W 90–75	6–1	27 – Berry II	6 – Tied	5 – Tied	Dean Smith Center (21,163); Chapel Hill, NC
Dec 6, 2015*; 6:00 pm, ESPNU	No. 9	Davidson	W 98–65	7–1	17 – Britt	10 – Meeks	4 – Tied	Dean Smith Center (14,805); Chapel Hill, NC
Dec 12, 2015*; 5:15 pm, ESPN	No. 3	at Texas	L 82–84	7–2	20 – Paige	6 – Meeks	3 – Paige	Frank Erwin Center (16,540); Austin, TX
Dec 16, 2015*; 7:00 pm, ESPN2	No. 11	Tulane	W 96–72	8–2	25 – Johnson	10 – Johnson	9 – Berry II	Dean Smith Center (16,199); Chapel Hill, NC
Dec 19, 2015*; 1:00 pm, CBS	No. 11	vs. No. 22 UCLA; CBS Sports Classic	W 89–76	9–2	27 – Johnson	9 – Johnson	6 – Paige	Barclays Center (16,311); Brooklyn, NY
Dec 21, 2015*; 7:00 pm, ESPN2	No. 7	Appalachian State	W 94–70	10–2	22 – Johnson	10 – Jackson	11 – Berry II	Dean Smith Center (18,336); Chapel Hill, NC
Dec 28, 2015*; 6:00 pm, ESPNU	No. 7	UNC Greensboro	W 96–63	11–2	16 – Johnson	16 – Johnson	5 – Britt	Dean Smith Center (19,246); Chapel Hill, NC
ACC Regular Season
Dec 30, 2015; 7:00 pm, ESPN2	No. 7	Clemson	W 80–69	12–2 (1–0)	18 – Paige	9 – Johnson	4 – Berry II	Dean Smith Center (17,168); Chapel Hill, NC
Jan 2, 2016; 12:00 pm, ACCN	No. 7	Georgia Tech	W 86–78	13–2 (2–0)	19 – Berry II	11 – Johnson	4 – Berry II	Dean Smith Center (17,392); Chapel Hill, NC
Jan 4, 2016; 7:00 pm, ESPN	No. 6	at Florida State	W 106–90	14–2 (3–0)	39 – Johnson	23 – Johnson	5 – Paige	Donald L. Tucker Civic Center (11,095); Tallahassee, FL
Jan 9, 2016; 8:00 pm, ESPN	No. 6	at Syracuse	W 84–73	15–2 (4–0)	21 – Hicks	8 – Hicks	8 – Tied	Carrier Dome (26,811); Syracuse, NY
Jan 16, 2016; 12:00 pm, ESPN	No. 5	NC State; Carolina–State Game	W 67–55	16–2 (5–0)	23 – Meeks	6 – Tied	4 – Tied	Dean Smith Center (21,750); Chapel Hill, NC
Jan 20, 2016; 7:00 pm, ESPN2	No. 2	Wake Forest	W 83–68	17–2 (6–0)	27 – Johnson	11 – Johnson	3 – Tied	Dean Smith Center (19,053); Chapel Hill, NC
Jan 24, 2016; 6:30 pm, ESPNU	No. 2	at Virginia Tech	W 75–70	18–2 (7–0)	19 – Johnson	17 – Johnson	7 – Paige	Cassell Coliseum (9,567); Blacksburg, VA
Jan 30, 2016; 4:00 pm, ESPN2	No. 2	Boston College	W 89–62	19–2 (8–0)	17 – Johnson	11 – Johnson	6 – Tied	Dean Smith Center (20,208); Chapel Hill, NC
Feb 1, 2016; 7:00 pm, ESPN	No. 2	at No. 19 Louisville	L 65–71	19–3 (8–1)	16 – Jackson	11 – Johnson	4 – Paige	KFC Yum! Center (22,781); Louisville, KY
Feb 6, 2016; 7:00 pm, ESPN	No. 2	at Notre Dame; ESPN College GameDay	L 76–80	19–4 (8–2)	21 – Paige	14 – Johnson	5 – Berry II	Edmund P. Joyce Center (9,149); South Bend, IN
Feb 9, 2016; 8:00 pm, ACCN	No. 9	at Boston College	W 68–65	20–4 (9–2)	20 – Jackson	7 – Meeks	6 – Berry II	Conte Forum (5,126); Chestnut Hill, MA
Feb 14, 2016; 1:00 pm, ACCN	No. 9	Pittsburgh	W 85–64	21–4 (10–2)	19 – Johnson	7 – Johnson	6 – Tied	Dean Smith Center (20,011); Chapel Hill, NC
Feb 17, 2016; 9:00 pm, ESPN/ACCN	No. 5	No. 20 Duke; Rivalry	L 73–74	21–5 (10–3)	29 – Johnson	19 – Johnson	6 – Britt	Dean Smith Center (21,750); Chapel Hill, NC
Feb 20, 2016; 1:00 pm, CBS	No. 5	No. 11 Miami (FL)	W 96–71	22–5 (11–3)	16 – Johnson	15 – Johnson	8 – Jackson	Dean Smith Center (20,151); Chapel Hill, NC
Feb 24, 2016; 8:00 pm, ACCN	No. 7	at NC State; Carolina–State Game	W 80–68	23–5 (12–3)	22 – Johnson	11 – Johnson	3 – Tied	PNC Arena (19,500); Raleigh, NC
Feb 27, 2016; 6:30 pm, ESPN	No. 7	at No. 3 Virginia; ESPN College GameDay	L 74–79	23–6 (12–4)	21 – Berry II	7 – Johnson	4 – Tied	John Paul Jones Arena (14,593); Charlottesville, VA
Feb 29, 2016; 7:00 pm, ESPN	No. 8	Syracuse	W 75–70	24–6 (13–4)	14 – Johnson	10 – Johnson	8 – Paige	Dean Smith Center (20,714); Chapel Hill, NC
Mar 5, 2016; 6:30 pm, ESPN	No. 8	at No. 17 Duke; Rivalry/ESPN College GameDay	W 76–72	25–6 (14–4)	18 – Johnson	21 – Johnson	4 – Pinson	Cameron Indoor Stadium (9,314); Durham, NC
ACC Tournament
March 10, 2016; 12:00 pm, ESPN/ACCN	(1) No. 7	vs. (8) Pittsburgh; Quarterfinals	W 88–71	26–6	20 – Berry II	10 – Johnson	7 – Pinson	Verizon Center (18,561); Washington, D.C.
March 11, 2016; 7:00 pm, ESPN/ACCN	(1) No. 7	vs. (4) Notre Dame; Semifinals	W 78–47	27–6	16 – Paige	15 – Hicks	7 – Paige	Verizon Center (20,719); Washington, D.C.
March 12, 2016; 9:00 pm, ESPN/ACCN	(1) No. 7	vs. (2) No. 4 Virginia; Championship	W 61–57	28–6	19 – Berry II	9 – Johnson	5 – Johnson	Verizon Center (20,719); Washington, D.C.
NCAA tournament
Mar 17, 2016*; 7:20 pm, TBS	(1 E) No. 3	vs. (16 E) Florida Gulf Coast; First Round	W 83–67	29–6	18 – Johnson	7 – Johnson	5 – Paige	PNC Arena (17,387); Raleigh, NC
Mar 19, 2016*; 9:40 pm, TBS	(1 E) No. 3	vs. (9 E) Providence; Second Round	W 85–66	30–6	21 – Johnson	10 – Johnson	3 – Tied	PNC Arena (19,433); Raleigh, NC
Mar 25, 2016*; 9:57 pm, TBS	(1 E) No. 3	vs. (5 E) No. 14 Indiana; Sweet Sixteen	W 101–86	31–6	21 – Paige	10 – Johnson	6 – Paige	Wells Fargo Center (20,686); Philadelphia, PA
Mar 27, 2016; 8:49 pm, TBS	(1 E) No. 3	vs. (6 E) Notre Dame; Elite Eight	W 88–74	32–6	25 – Johnson	12 – Johnson	8 – Berry II	Wells Fargo Center (20,743); Philadelphia, PA
April 2, 2016; 8:49 pm, TBS	(1 E) No. 3	vs. (10 MW) Syracuse; Final Four	W 83–66	33–6	16 – Tied	9 – Johnson	10 – Berry II	NRG Stadium (75,505); Houston, TX
April 4, 2016*; 9:19 pm, TBS	(1 E) No. 3	vs. (2 S) No. 6 Villanova; National Championship	L 74–77	33–7	21 – Paige	8 – Johnson	6 – Paige	NRG Stadium (74,340); Houston, TX
*Non-conference game. ^{#}Rankings from AP Poll. (#) Tournament seedings in parentheses. E=East region. All times are in Eastern Time.

== Rankings ==
Ranking movements Legend: ██ Increase in ranking ██ Decrease in ranking т = Tied with team above or below
	Week																			
Poll	Pre	2	3	4	5	6	7	8	9	10	11	12	13	14	15	16	17	18	19	Final
AP	1	1	9	9	3	11	7	7	6	5	2	2	2	9	5	7	8	7	3	N/A
Coaches	1-T	1	8	9	3	11	7	8	7	5	2	1	1	8	4	6	8	7	3	2

== Players drafted into the NBA ==
Year	Round	Pick	Player	NBA club
2016	1	25	Brice Johnson	Los Angeles Clippers
2016	2	55	Marcus Paige	Brooklyn Nets
2017	1	15	Justin Jackson	Portland Trail Blazers
