= Baker Dunleavy =

American basketball player and coach (born 1982)

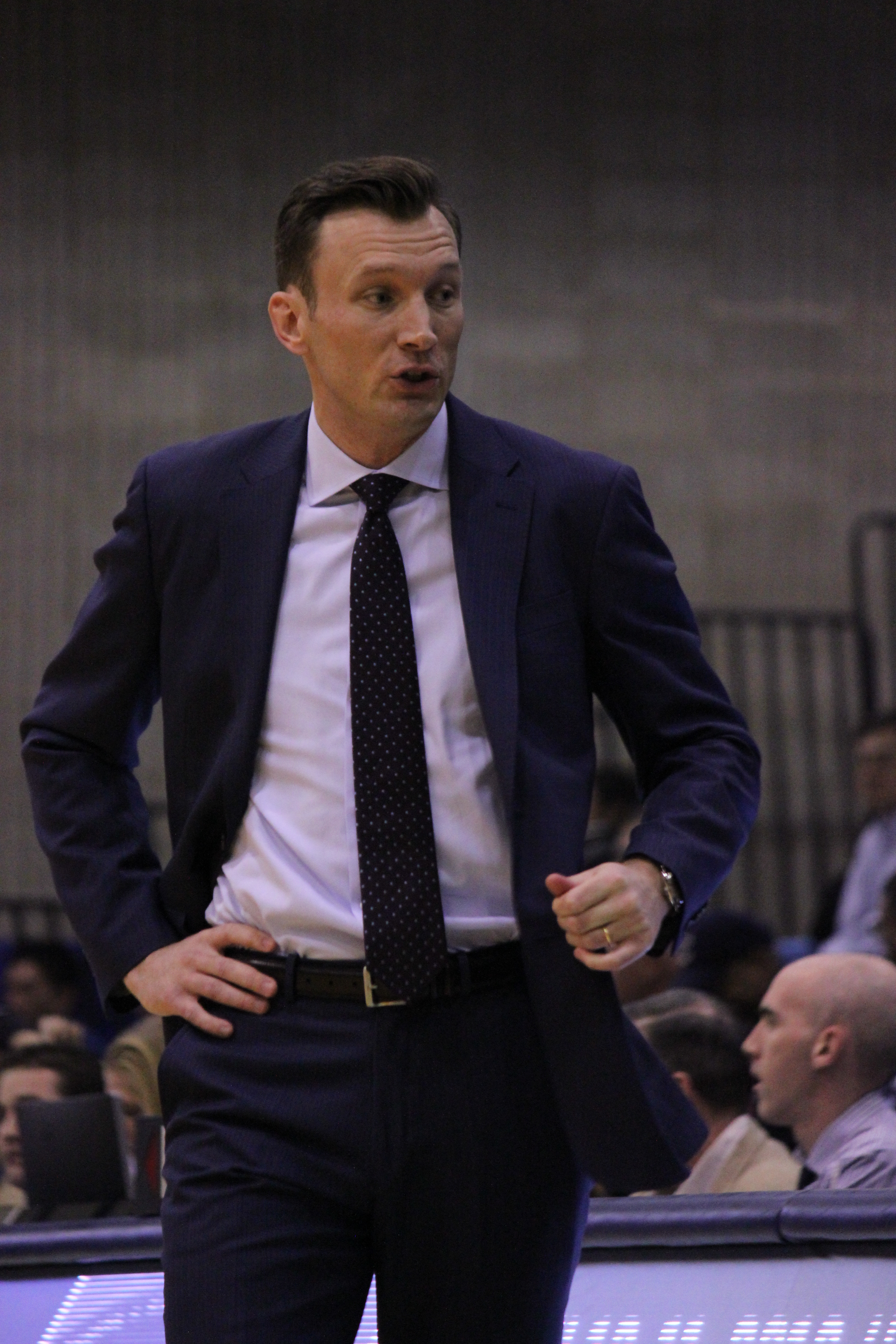
- Dunleavy in 2017

Current position
- Title: General Manager of Basketball Operations
- Team: Villanova
- Conference: Big East

Biographical details
- Born: October 5, 1982 (age 44); Fort Worth, Texas, U.S.

Playing career
- 2003–2006: Villanova

Coaching career (HC unless noted)
- 2012–2017: Villanova (assistant)
- 2017–2023: Quinnipiac

Administrative career (AD unless noted)
- 2010–2012: Villanova (Dir. of Operations)
- 2023–present: Villanova (GM of Basketball)

Head coaching record
- Overall: 86–93 (.480)
- Tournaments: 0–1 (CIT)

Baker Dunleavy (born October 5, 1982) is an American college basketball coach who is currently serving as general manager of basketball operations at his alma mater, Villanova University. He was previously the head coach for the Quinnipiac Bobcats men's basketball team.

== Playing career ==
After playing at Jesuit High School, Dunleavy took a post-graduate year at the Lawrenceville School, where he subsequently committed to Villanova. In a class with the likes of Randy Foye, Allan Ray, and Curtis Sumpter, Dunleavy appeared in 28 games over his career and was part of the Wildcats' 2005 Sweet 16 squad.

== Coaching career ==
Upon graduation from Villanova, Dunleavy entered the private sector, going to work for Merrill Lynch before accepting a job under Jay Wright in 2010 as the director of basketball operations. Dunleavy climbed the ranks to an assistant coach in 2012, and associate head coach in 2013. In his tenure as an assistant at Villanova, Dunleavy helped the Wildcats to four straight Big East Conference regular-season championships, along with the 2016 national championship team.

On March 28, 2017, Dunleavy was named the seventh coach in Quinnipiac history, and third in Division I, replacing Tom Moore.

== Personal life ==
Dunleavy is the son of former NBA player and coach Mike Dunleavy Sr. His brother Mike Jr. played in the NBA from 2002 to 2017, while his brother, James, is an NBA player agent.

Dunleavy married Chrissi Ingelsby in 2012.

== Head coaching record ==
Record table
Season	Team	Overall	Conference	Standing	Postseason
Quinnipiac Bobcats (Metro Atlantic Athletic Conference) (2017–2023)
2017–18	Quinnipiac	12–21	7–11	T–7th	
2018–19	Quinnipiac	16–15	11–7	T–2nd	CIT First Round
2019–20	Quinnipiac	15–15	10–10	5th	
2020–21	Quinnipiac	9–13	7–9	8th	
2021–22	Quinnipiac	14–17	7–13	T–10th	
2022–23	Quinnipiac	20–12	11–9	T–3rd	
Quinnipiac:		86–93 (.480)	53–59 (.473)		
Total:		86–93 (.480)			
