= Kris Jenkins (basketball) =

American basketball player (born 1993)

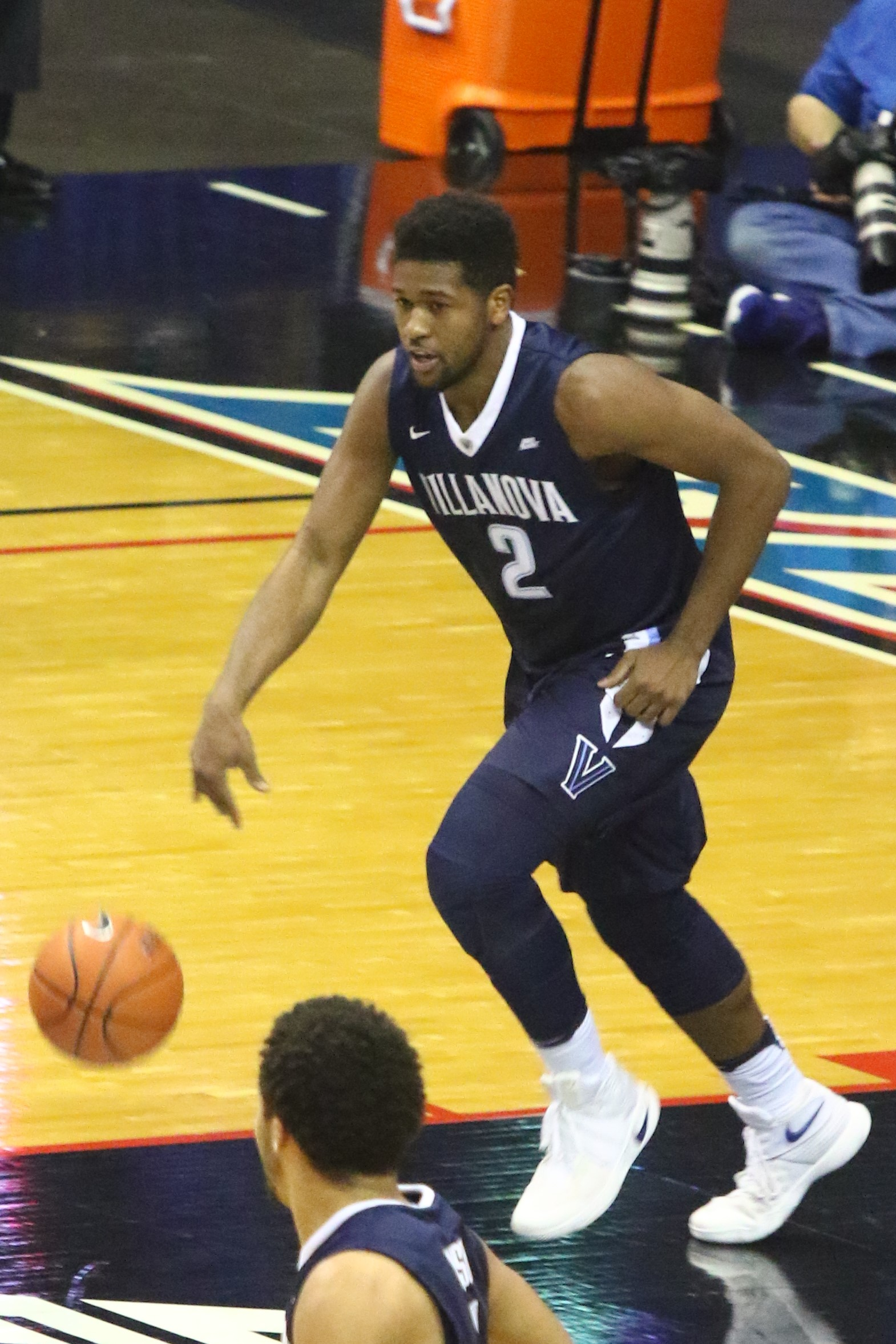
- Jenkins for the 2016–17 Villanova Wildcats

Villanova Wildcats
- Title: Student athlete development assistant
- League: Big East Conference

Personal information
- Born: November 20, 1993 (age 32) Columbia, South Carolina, U.S.
- Listed height: 6 ft 6 in (1.98 m)
- Listed weight: 235 lb (107 kg)

Career information
- High school: Gonzaga (Washington, D.C.)
- College: Villanova (2013–2017)
- NBA draft: 2017: undrafted
- Playing career: 2017–2019
- Position: Small forward

Career history
- 2017: Sioux Falls Skyforce
- 2018: Yakima SunKings
- 2018–2019: Eisbären Bremerhaven

Career highlights
- NCAA champion (2016); Honorable mention All- Big East (2017)

Kris Jenkins (born November 20, 1993) is an American former professional basketball player who is a student athlete development assistant at Villanova University. He played college basketball for the Villanova Wildcats and is best known for making the buzzer-beating three-point shot to win the 2016 NCAA championship game.

== High school career ==
Jenkins attended Gonzaga College High School. As a junior in 2011–12, he averaged 20.6 points and 10.4 rebounds per game. As a senior, he had 18.3 points and 10.3 rebounds per game. The Washington Post named him the 2012–13 Boys Basketball All-Met Player of the Year.

== College career ==
Jenkins played his entire college basketball career for the Villanova Wildcats. During his freshman season, the 2013–14 season, he averaged 4.1 points per game as a reserve player. The following season, he had 6.3 points per game.

As a junior, on March 1, 2016, Jenkins scored a career-high 31 points in a win over DePaul. He averaged 19.7 points per game in the Big East Tournament and was named to the All-Tournament team. In the NCAA championship game on April 4, 2016, against North Carolina, Jenkins hit the game-winning three-point shot as time expired. In his junior season, Jenkins averaged 13.6 points and 3.9 rebounds per game while shooting 45.9 percent of his field-goal attempts and 38.6 percent from beyond the arc.

Jenkins was an Honorable Mention All-Big East selection as a senior. In his senior season, he posted averages of 13.1 points and 4.1 rebounds per game. Jenkins shot 38.4 percent from the floor, 36.0 percent from behind the arc, and 86.2 percent from the foul line. In his Villanova career, Jenkins scored 1,382 points, 34th on the program's all-time list.

== Professional career ==
=== Sioux Falls Skyforce (2017) ===
After going undrafted in the 2017 NBA draft, Jenkins joined the Washington Wizards for the 2017 NBA Summer League. Jenkins was picked by the Sioux Falls Skyforce with the 14th pick in the 2017 NBA G League Draft. On December 16, 2017, Jenkins was waived by the Skyforce.

=== Eisbären Bremerhaven (2018–2019) ===
Kris Jenkins signed with the German club Eisbären Bremerhaven on August 14, 2018.

== Executive career ==
In February 2020, Jenkins was hired by Villanova University, his alma mater, as an assistant in the student athlete development field.

== Personal life ==
Kris Jenkins grew up living with Nate Britt. The two were opponents in the 2016 NCAA Men's Division I Basketball Championship Game, as Britt played for the Tar Heels. The following year, when the Tar Heels made a second consecutive appearance in the NCAA Tournament title game, Jenkins attended, supporting his adoptive brother's team, sitting right behind the Tar Heel bench and wearing a Carolina-branded T-shirt.
