= 2015–16 Seton Hall Pirates men's basketball team =

American college basketball season

2015–16 Seton Hall Pirates men's basketball

Big East tournament champions

NCAA tournament, First Round
- Conference: Big East Conference

Ranking
- AP: No. 20
- Record: 25–9 (12–6 Big East)
- Head coach: Kevin Willard (6th season)
- Assistant coaches: Shaheen Holloway; Fred Hill; Grant Billmeier
- Home arena: Prudential Center; Walsh Gymnasium

2015–16 Big East men's basketball standings
	Conf.				Overall
Team	W		L	PCT	W		L	PCT
No. 6 Villanova	16	–	2	.889	35	–	5	.875
No. 9 Xavier	14	–	4	.778	28	–	5	.848
No. 20 Seton Hall †	12	–	6	.667	25	–	9	.735
Providence	10	–	8	.556	24	–	11	.686
Butler	10	–	8	.556	22	–	11	.667
Creighton	9	–	9	.500	20	–	15	.571
Marquette	8	–	10	.444	20	–	13	.606
Georgetown	7	–	11	.389	15	–	18	.455
DePaul	3	–	15	.167	9	–	22	.290
St. John's	1	–	17	.056	8	–	24	.250
† 2016 Big East tournament winner Rankings from AP poll

The 2015–16 Seton Hall Pirates men's basketball team represented Seton Hall University in the 2015–16 NCAA Division I men's basketball season. The Pirates played home games in Newark, New Jersey at the Prudential Center, with one exhibition and one regular season game at Walsh Gymnasium in South Orange, New Jersey. They were coached, for the sixth year, by Kevin Willard. They were members of the Big East Conference. They finished the season 25–9, 12–6 in Big East play to finish in third place. They defeated Creighton, Xavier, and the eventual national champion Villanova to become champions of the Big East tournament. They received the Big East Conference's automatic bid to the NCAA tournament where they lost in the first round to Gonzaga.

== Previous season ==
The Pirates finished the season 16–15, 6-12 in Big East play to finish in a tie for seventh place. They lost in the first round of the Big East tournament to Marquette.

== Departures ==
Name	Number	Pos.	Height	Weight	Year	Hometown	Notes
Brandon Mobley	2	F	6'9"	225	Senior	Savannah, GA	Graduated
Sterling Gibbs	4	G	6'2"	185	RS Junior	Scotch Plains, NJ	Graduate transferred to Connecticut
Haralds Kārlis	13	F	6'6"	210	Senior	Riga, Latvia	Graduated
Cheir Ajou	42	C	7'1"	245	RS Junior	Aweil, South Sudan	Transferred to Texas Wesleyan
Stephane Manga	45	F	6'6"	220	Senior	Orléans, France	Graduated

=== Incoming transfers ===
Name	Number	Pos.	Height	Weight	Year	Hometown	Previous School
Jevon Thomas	2	G	6'0"	180	Junior	Queens, NY	Transferred from Kansas State. Under NCAA transfer rules, Thomas will have to sit out for the 2015–16 season. Will have two years of remaining eligibility.
Braeden Anderson	4	F	6'9"	225	RS Junior	Okotoks, AB	Transferred from Fresno State. Will be eligible to play immediately since Anderson graduated from Fresno State.
Derrick Gordon	32	G	6'3"	205	RS Senior	Plainfield, NJ	Transferred from Massachusetts. Will be eligible to play immediately since Gordon graduated from Massachusetts.

== Incoming recruits ==
College recruiting
Name	Hometown	School	Height	Weight	Commit date
Amarveer Singh; SF	New Orleans, LA	Thurgood Marshall High School	6 ft 7 in (2.01 m)	180 lb (82 kg)	Mar 2, 2015
Amarveer Singh; SF	Recruit ratings: Scout: Rivals: (80)				
Myles Carter; SF	Chicago, IL	Saint Rita High School	6 ft 8 in (2.03 m)	221 lb (100 kg)	Mar 23, 2015
Myles Carter; SF	Recruit ratings: Scout: Rivals: (76)				
Dalton Soffer; SG	San Diego, CA	Poway High School	6 ft 4 in (1.93 m)	190 lb (86 kg)	Nov 12, 2014
Dalton Soffer; SG	Recruit ratings: Scout: Rivals: (67)				
Overall recruit ranking:
Note: In many cases, Scout, Rivals, 247Sports, On3, and ESPN may conflict in their listings of height and weight.; In these cases, the average was taken. ESPN grades are on a 100-point scale.; Sources: "2015 Team Ranking". Rivals.

== Roster ==
2015–16 Seton Hall Pirates men's basketball team
Players
Coaches

Pos.	#	Name	Height	Weight	Year	Hometown
G	0	Khadeen Carrington	6 ft 3 in (1.91 m)	180 lb (82 kg)	So	Brooklyn, New York
F	1	Michael Nzei	6 ft 7 in (2.01 m)	200 lb (91 kg)	So	Makurdi, Nigeria
G	2	Jevon Thomas (I)	6 ft 1 in (1.85 m)	185 lb (84 kg)	Jr	Queens, New York
F	4	Braeden Anderson	6 ft 9 in (2.06 m)	240 lb (109 kg)	RS Jr	Okotoks, Alberta
G	14	Ismael Sanogo	6 ft 8 in (2.03 m)	210 lb (95 kg)	So	Newark, New Jersey
G	15	Isaiah Whitehead	6 ft 4 in (1.93 m)	210 lb (95 kg)	So	Brooklyn, New York
F	20	Desi Rodriguez	6 ft 6 in (1.98 m)	215 lb (98 kg)	So	Brooklyn, New York
G	21	Dalton Soffer	6 ft 5 in (1.96 m)	205 lb (93 kg)	Fr	San Diego, California
F	23	Myles Carter	6 ft 9 in (2.06 m)	230 lb (104 kg)	Fr	Chicago, Illinois
F	25	Rashed Anthony	6 ft 9 in (2.06 m)	235 lb (107 kg)	RS So	Orangeburg, South Carolina
F	31	Ángel Delgado	6 ft 9 in (2.06 m)	225 lb (102 kg)	So	Bajos de Haina, Dominican Republic
G	32	Derrick Gordon	6 ft 3 in (1.91 m)	205 lb (93 kg)	RS Sr	Plainfield, New Jersey
G/F	33	Veer Singh	6 ft 7 in (2.01 m)	195 lb (88 kg)	Fr	New Orleans, Louisiana

Head coach

- Kevin Willard (Pittsburgh)

Assistant coach(es)

- Shaheen Holloway (Seton Hall)
- Fred Hill (Montclair State)
- Dwayne Morton (LIU Brooklyn)

Legend

- (C) Team captain
- (S) Suspended
- (I) Ineligible
- (W) Walk-on
- Injured
- Current redshirt

Roster

== Schedule ==
Date time, TV	Rank^{#}	Opponent^{#}	Result	Record	Site (attendance) city, state
Exhibition
Oct 31, 2015*; 12:00 pm		Baruch	W 84–79		Walsh Gymnasium (1,073); South Orange, NJ
Non-conference regular season
Nov 13, 2015*; 7:00 pm, FSN		Dartmouth	W 84–67	1–0	Prudential Center (6,114); Newark, NJ
Nov 15, 2015*; 1:30 pm, FS1		Wagner	W 69–59	2–0	Walsh Gymnasium (1,800); South Orange, NJ
Nov 19, 2015*; 7:00 pm, ESPNU		vs. Long Beach State; Charleston Classic quarterfinals	L 77–80	2–1	TD Arena (3,437); Charleston, SC
Nov 20, 2015*; 7:00 pm, ESPNU		vs. Bradley; Charleston Classic consolation round	W 67–59	3–1	TD Arena (2,820); Charleston, SC
Nov 21, 2015*; 3:30 pm, ESPN3		vs. Ole Miss; Charleston Classic 5th place game	W 75–63	4–1	TD Arena (1,553); Charleston, SC
Nov 28, 2015*; 7:30 pm, FS1		Georgia	W 69–62	5–1	Prudential Center (6,553); Newark, NJ
Dec 2, 2015*; 7:00 pm, ASN		at George Washington	L 64–72	5–2	Charles E. Smith Center (2,280); Washington, D.C.
Dec 5, 2015*; 12:00 pm, ESPNews		at Rutgers; Rivalry/Garden State Hardwood Classic	W 84–55	6–2	The RAC (5,631); Piscataway, NJ
Dec 10, 2015*; 8:00 pm, FS1		Troy	W 78–69	7–2	Prudential Center (5,549); Newark, NJ
Dec 13, 2015*; 2:30 pm, FS1		Saint Peter's	W 72–64	8–2	Prudential Center (6,433); Newark, NJ
Dec 19, 2015*; 12:00 pm, FOX		Wichita State	W 80–76 ^{OT}	9–2	Prudential Center (7,596); Newark, NJ
Dec 22, 2015*; 6:30 pm, FS2		South Florida	W 66–49	10–2	Prudential Center (5,700); Newark, NJ
Big East Regular Season
Dec 30, 2015; 7:00 pm, FS1		at Marquette	W 83–63	11–2 (1–0)	BMO Harris Bradley Center (13,314); Milwaukee, WI
Jan 2, 2016; 11 am, FS1		DePaul; Big East New Year's Marathon	W 78–74	12–2 (2–0)	Prudential Center (8,201); Newark, NJ
Jan 6, 2016; 7:00 pm, FS1		at No. 11 Villanova	L 63–72	12–3 (2–1)	The Pavilion (6,500); Villanova, PA
Jan 9, 2016; 2:00 pm, FS1		Creighton	L 67–82	12–4 (2–2)	Prudential Center (8,010); Newark, NJ
Jan 16, 2016; 4:30 pm, FS1		at No. 12 Providence	W 81–72	13–4 (3–2)	Dunkin' Donuts Center (11,148); Providence, RI
Jan 20, 2016; 9:00 pm, CBSSN		No. 4 Villanova	L 71–72	13–5 (3–3)	Prudential Center (8,788); Newark, NJ
Jan 23, 2016; 2:00 pm, FSN		at No. 5 Xavier	L 76–84	13–6 (3–4)	Cintas Center (10,368); Cincinnati, OH
Jan 27, 2016; 7:00 pm, FS1		St. John's	W 79–60	14–6 (4–4)	Prudential Center (6,767); Newark, NJ
Jan 30, 2016; 8:00 pm, FSN		at Creighton	W 75–65	15–6 (5–4)	CenturyLink Center (17,927); Omaha, NE
Feb 3, 2016; 8:30 pm, FS1		Marquette	W 79–62	16–6 (6–4)	Prudential Center (6,008); Newark, NJ
Feb 6, 2016; 9:05 pm, CBSSN		Georgetown	W 69–61	17–6 (7–4)	Prudential Center (9,167); Newark, NJ
Feb 10, 2016; 7:00 pm, FS1		Butler	L 75–81	17–7 (7–5)	Prudential Center (7,476); Newark, NJ
Feb 17, 2016; 9:15 pm, FS1		at Georgetown	W 72–64	18–7 (8–5)	Verizon Center (5,278); Washington, D.C.
Feb 21, 2016; 12:00 pm, FS1		at St. John's	W 62–61	19–7 (9–5)	Madison Square Garden (13,204); New York City, NY
Feb 25, 2016; 7:00 pm, FS1		Providence	W 70–52	20–7 (10–5)	Prudential Center (8,600); Newark, NJ
Feb 28, 2016; 12:30 pm, FS1		No. 5 Xavier	W 90–81	21–7 (11–5)	Prudential Center (10,353); Newark, NJ
Mar 2, 2016; 8:30 pm, FS1		at Butler	L 78–85	21–8 (11–6)	Hinkle Fieldhouse (7,392); Indianapolis, IN
Mar 5, 2016; 12:00 pm, FSN		at DePaul	W 80–66	22–8 (12–6)	Allstate Arena (5,954); Rosemont, IL
Big East tournament
Mar 10, 2016; 9:30 pm, FS1	(3)	vs. (6) Creighton; Quarterfinals	W 81–73	23–8	Madison Square Garden (13,813); New York City, NY
Mar 11, 2016; 9:00 pm, FS1	(3)	vs. (2) No. 5 Xavier; Semifinals	W 87–83	24–8	Madison Square Garden (17,130); New York City, NY
Mar 12, 2016; 5:30 pm, FOX	(3)	vs. (1) No. 3 Villanova; Championship	W 69–67	25–8	Madison Square Garden (19,812); New York City, NY
NCAA tournament
Mar 17, 2016*; 9:57 pm, truTV	(6 MW) No. 20	vs. (11 MW) Gonzaga; First Round	L 52–68	25–9	Pepsi Center (19,500); Denver, CO
*Non-conference game. ^{#}Rankings from AP Poll. (#) Tournament seedings in parentheses. MW=Midwest Region. All times are in Eastern Time.

== Rankings ==
Ranking movement Legend: ██ Improvement in ranking. ██ Decrease in ranking. RV=Received votes.
Poll	Pre	Wk 1	Wk 2	Wk 3	Wk 4	Wk 5	Wk 6	Wk 7	Wk 8	Wk 9	Wk 10	Wk 11	Wk 12	Wk 13	Wk 14	Wk 15	Wk 16	Wk 17	Wk 18	Wk 19	Final
AP	NR	NR	NR	NR	NR	NR	NR	NR	NR	RV	NR	NR	NR	NR	RV	NR	NR	RV	RV	20	N/A
Coaches	NR	NR	NR	NR	NR	NR	NR	NR	NR	NR	NR	RV	NR	RV	RV	RV	RV	RV	RV	21	RV
