= 2015–16 Big East Conference men's basketball season =

- League: NCAA Division I
- Sport: Basketball
- Teams: 10
- TV partner(s): CBS, CBSSN, FOX, FS1, FSN

Regular Season
- Season MVP: Kris Dunn
- champions: Villanova
- runners-up: Xavier

Tournament
- Champions: Seton Hall
- Runners-up: Villanova

Basketball seasons
- ← 2014–15 2016–17 →

2015–16 Big East men's basketball standings
	Conf.				Overall
Team	W		L	PCT	W		L	PCT
No. 6 Villanova	16	–	2	.889	35	–	5	.875
No. 9 Xavier	14	–	4	.778	28	–	5	.848
No. 20 Seton Hall †	12	–	6	.667	25	–	9	.735
Providence	10	–	8	.556	24	–	11	.686
Butler	10	–	8	.556	22	–	11	.667
Creighton	9	–	9	.500	20	–	15	.571
Marquette	8	–	10	.444	20	–	13	.606
Georgetown	7	–	11	.389	15	–	18	.455
DePaul	3	–	15	.167	9	–	22	.290
St. John's	1	–	17	.056	8	–	24	.250
† 2016 Big East tournament winner Rankings from AP poll

The 2015–16 Big East Conference men's basketball season began with practices in October 2015, followed by the start of the followed by the start of the 2015–16 NCAA Division I men's basketball season in November. The season marked the 37th year in the conference's history, but the third as a non-football conference, which officially formed on July 1, 2013. Conference play began on December 30, 2015, and concluded in March with the 2016 Big East men's basketball tournament at Madison Square Garden in New York.

Villanova won the regular season championship by two games over Xavier with a 16–2 conference record. However, Seton Hall, who finished in third, won the Big East tournament, defeating Villanova in the championship game. Providence's Kris Dunn was named the conference's player of the year for the second straight year, while Seton Hall coach Kevin Willard and Villanova coach Jay Wright shared coach of the year.

Creighton received a bid to the National Invitation Tournament and lost in the quarterfinals.

Villanova, Xavier, Seton Hall, Providence and Butler all received bids to the NCAA tournament. Only Villanova advanced past the Second Round of the Tournament. On April 4, Villanova defeated North Carolina in the National Championship game to win the school's second NCAA Championship. Ryan Arcidiacono was named the Most Outstanding Player of the tournament.

== Preseason ==
	Coaches'
1.	Villanova (9)
2.	Georgetown (1)
3.	Butler
4.	Xavier
5.	Providence
6.	Marquette
7.	Seton Hall
8.	DePaul
9.	Creighton
10.	St. John's

() first place votes

=== Preseason All-Big East teams ===
2015-16 Preseason All–Big East
Preseason Player of the Year	First Team	Second Team	Honorable Mention	Preseason Rookie of the Year
Kris Dunn, Jr., G., Providence	Kellen Dunham, Sr., G., Butler; Roosevelt Jones, Sr., F., Butler; D'Vauntes Smith-Rivera, Sr., G., Georgetown; Ryan Arcidiacono, Jr., G., Villanova; Jalen Reynolds, Jr., F., Xavier	Billy Garrett Jr., So., G., DePaul; Henry Ellenson, Fr., F., Marquette; Angel Delgado, So., F., Seton Hall; Isaiah Whitehead, So., G., Seton Hall; Daniel Ochefu, Sr., F., Villanova	Isaac Copeland, So., F., Georgetown; Luke Fischer, Jr., F., Marquette; Jalen Brunson, Fr., G., Villanova; Trevon Bluiett, So., F., Xavier	Jalen Brunson, Fr., G., Villanova

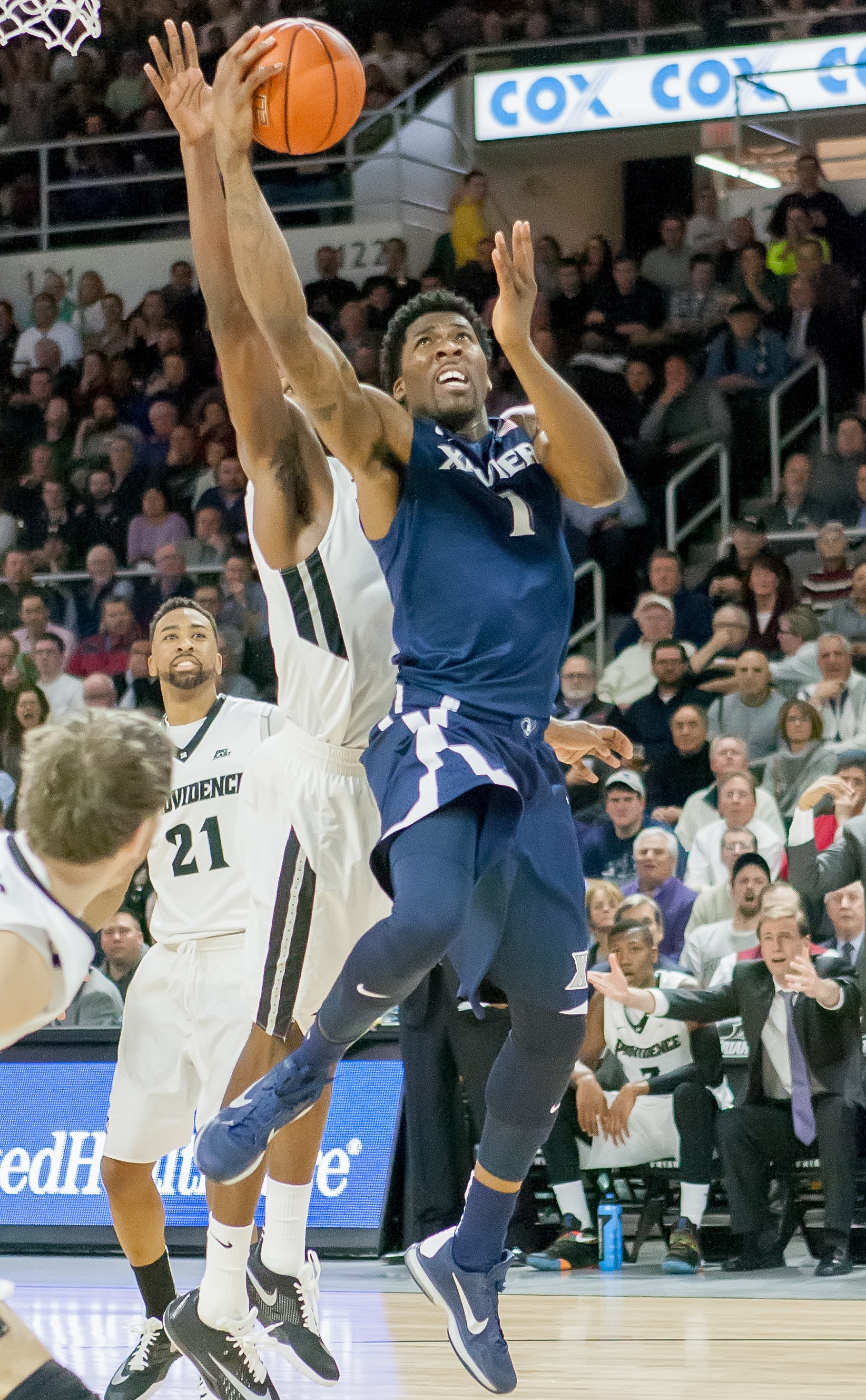
Jalen Reynolds

Big East recruits at the 2015 McDonald's All-American Boys Game

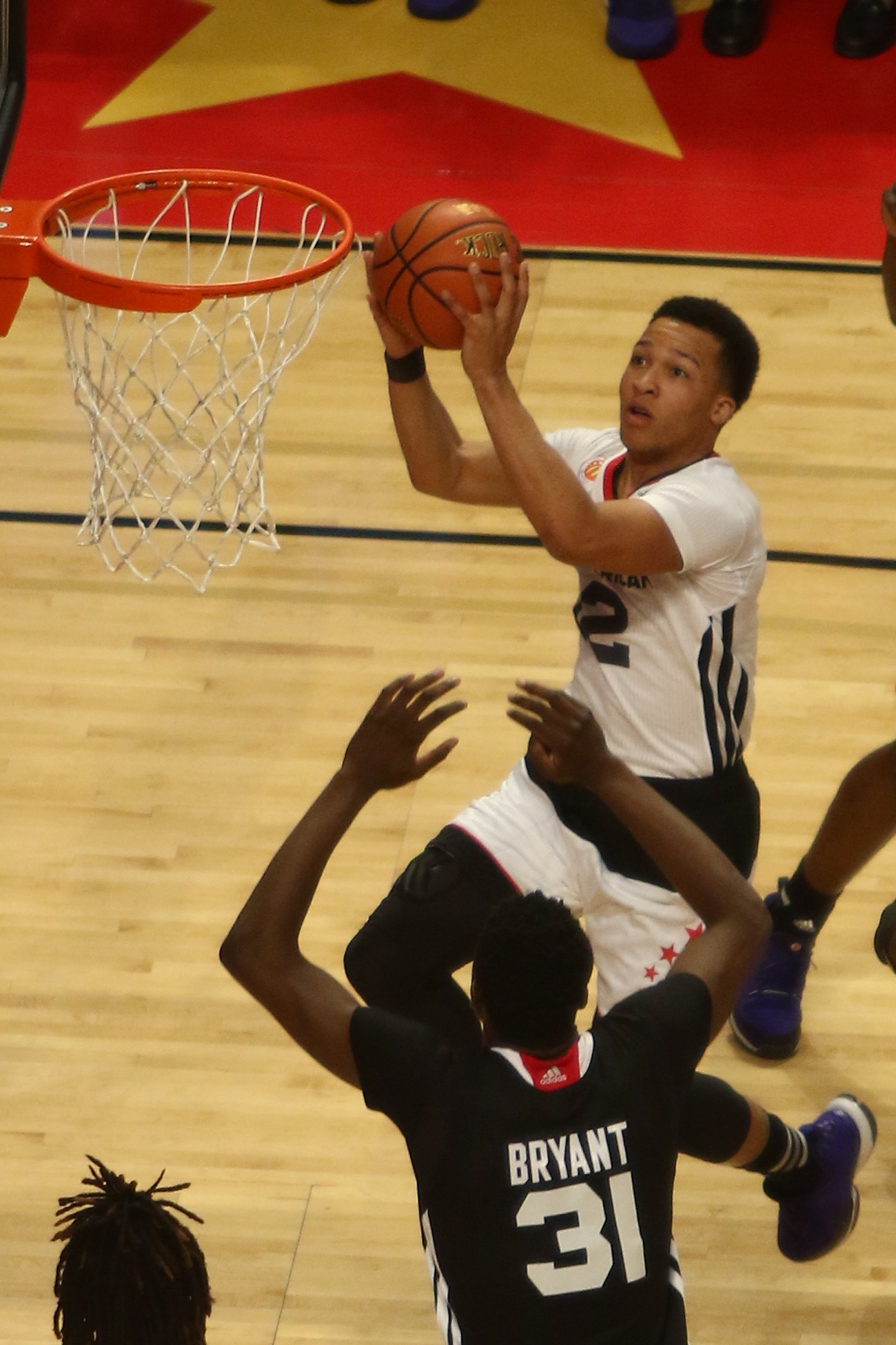
Jalen Brunson, Villanova

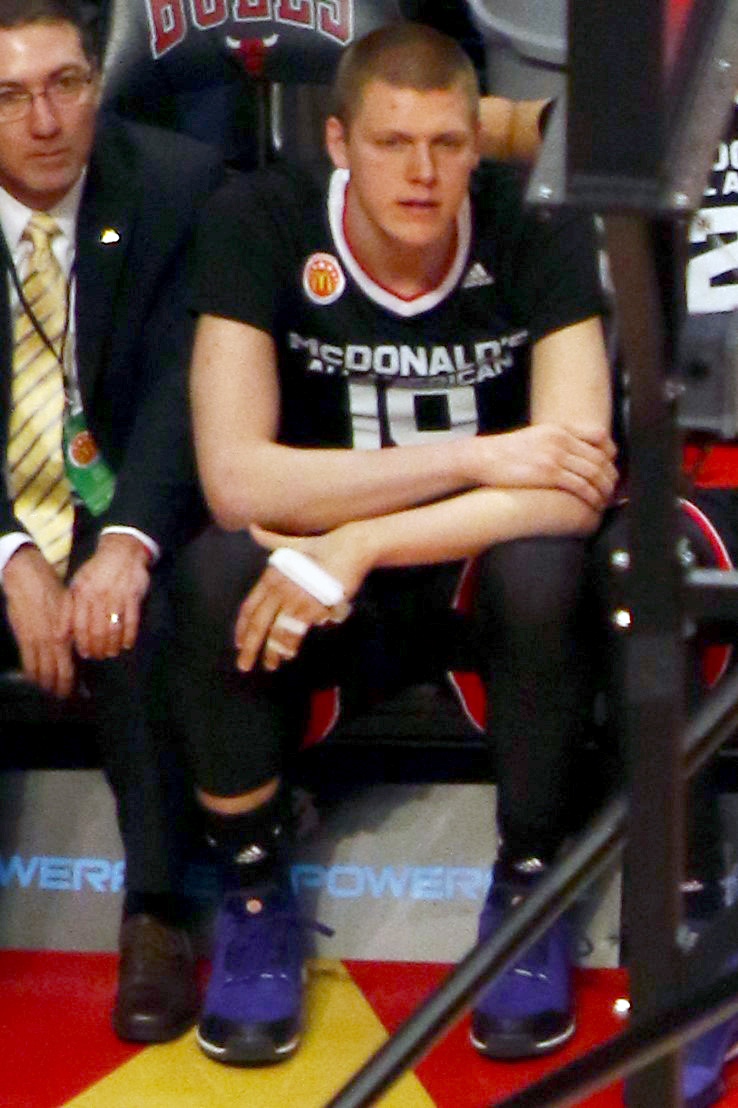
Henry Ellenson, Marquette

== Rankings ==
Legend
Increase in ranking
Decrease in ranking
Not ranked previous week

		Pre	Wk 2	Wk 3	Wk 4	Wk 5	Wk 6	Wk 7	Wk 8	Wk 9	Wk 10	Wk 11	Wk 12	Wk 13	Wk 14	Wk 15	Wk 16	Wk 17	Wk 18	Wk 19	Final
Butler	AP	24	22	RV	RV	18	17	9	9	18	23	18	RV						RV	RV	N/A
Butler	Coaches	22	20	RV	25	21	18	12	10	19	23	24	RV	RV					RV	RV	RV
Creighton	AP																				N/A
Creighton	C																				
DePaul	AP																				N/A
DePaul	C																				
Georgetown	AP	RV		RV	RV	RV	RV														N/A
Georgetown	C	RV	RV	RV		RV	RV														
Marquette	AP						RV														N/A
Marquette	C	RV																			
Providence	AP	RV	RV	RV	23	15	14	10	12	8	12	16	10	11	20	23	RV		RV	RV	N/A
Providence	C	RV	RV		24	18	14	14	13	9	12	17	10	11	17	20	24	RV	RV	RV	RV
Seton Hall	AP									RV					RV			RV	RV	20	N/A
Seton Hall	C											RV		RV	RV	RV	RV	RV	RV	21	RV
St. John's	AP																				N/A
St. John's	C																				
Villanova	AP	11	11	8	8	9	12	17	16	11	6	4	6	3	1	1	1	3	3	6	N/A
Villanova	C	9	8	9	7	6	13	17	16	13	7	4	6	4	1	1	1	2	2	6	1
Xavier	AP	RV	RV	23	12	12	10	6	6	10	7	5	7	6	5	8	5	5	5	9	N/A
Xavier	C	RV	RV	RV	18	13	10	6	6	12	8	6	8	5	4	7	5	5	5	9	11

== Regular season ==
=== Conference matrix ===
This table summarizes the head-to-head results between teams in conference play.

	Butler	Creighton	DePaul	Georgetown	Marquette	Providence	Seton Hall	St. John's	Villanova	Xavier
vs. Butler	–	1–1	0–2	0–2	1–1	2–0	0–2	0–2	2–0	2–0
vs. Creighton	1–1	–	0–2	1–1	1–1	2–0	1–1	0–2	2–0	1–1
vs. DePaul	2–0	2–0	–	2–0	1–1	1–1	2–0	1–1	2–0	2–0
vs. Georgetown	2–0	1–1	0–2	–	1–1	2–0	2–0	0–2	2–0	1–1
vs. Marquette	1–1	1–1	1–1	1–1	–	0–2	2–0	0–2	2–0	2–0
vs. Providence	0–2	0–2	1–1	0–2	2–0	–	2–0	0–2	1–1	1–1
vs. Seton Hall	2–0	1–1	0–2	0–2	0–2	0–2	–	0–2	2–0	1–1
vs. St. John's	2–0	2–0	1–1	2–0	2–0	2–0	2–0	–	2–0	2–0
vs. Villanova	0–2	0–2	0–2	0–2	0–2	1–1	0–2	0–2	–	1-1
vs. Xavier	0–2	1–1	0–2	1–1	0–2	0–2	1–1	0–2	1–1	–
Total	10–8	9–9	3–15	7–11	8–10	10–8	12–6	1–17	16-2	14-4

== Honors and awards ==
=== All-Big East awards and teams ===
2016 Big East Men's Basketball Individual Awards
Award	Recipient(s)
Player of the Year	Kris Dunn, G., Providence
Coach of the Year	Kevin Willard, Seton Hall; Jay Wright, Villanova
Defensive Player of the Year	Kris Dunn, G., Providence
Freshman of the Year	Henry Ellenson, F., Marquette
Most Improved Player of the Year	Ben Bentil, F., Providence
Scholar-Athlete of the Year	Kellen Dunham, G., Butler
Sixth Man Award	J. P. Macura, G., Xavier
Sportsmanship Award	Kellen Dunham, G., Butler

2016 Big East Men's Basketball All–Conference Teams
First Team	Second Team	Honorable Mention	All–Rookie Team
Henry Ellenson, Marquette †Ben Bentil, Providence †Kris Dunn, Providence †Isaiah Whitehead, Seton Hall †Josh Hart, Villanova; Trevon Bluiett, Xavier	Roosevelt Jones, Butler; Kelan Martin, Butler; Maurice Watson, Creighton; D'Vauntes Smith-Rivera, Georgetown; Ryan Arcidiacono, Villanova	Kellen Dunham, Butler; Ángel Delgado, Seton Hall; Daniel Ochefu, Villanova	Eli Cain, DePaul; Jessie Govan, Georgetown; Haanif Cheatham, Marquette †Henry Ellenson, Marquette; Kassoum Yakwe, St. John's †Jalen Brunson, Villanova †Edmond Sumner, Xavier
† – Denotes unanimous selection.^Due to a tie in the voting, additional positions were named.

== Postseason ==
=== Big East tournament ===
- March 9–12, 2016 Big East Conference Basketball Tournament, Madison Square Garden, New York City.

==== Seeds ====
All 10 Big East schools participated in the tournament. Teams were seeded by the 2015–16 Big East Conference season record. The top six teams received a first round bye. Seeding for the tournament was determined at the close of the regular conference season.

Seed	School	Conference	Tiebreaker
1	Villanova	16–2	
2	Xavier	14–4	
3	Seton Hall	12–6	
4	Providence	10–8	2–0 vs. Butler
5	Butler	10–8	0–2 vs. Providence
6	Creighton	9–9	
7	Marquette	8–10	
8	Georgetown	7–11	
9	DePaul	3–15	
10	St. John's	1–17	

==== Schedule ====
Game	Time*	Matchup^{#}	Television	Attendance
First round – Wednesday, March 9
1	7:00 pm	#9 DePaul 53 vs. #8 Georgetown 70	FS1	12,604
2	9:30 pm	#10 St. John's 93 vs. #7 Marquette 101	FS1	12,604
Quarterfinals – Thursday, March 10
3	12:00 pm	#8 Georgetown 67 vs. #1 Villanova 81	FS1	14,863
4	2:30 pm	#5 Butler 60 vs. #4 Providence 74	FS1	14,863
5	7:00 pm	#7 Marquette 72 vs. #2 Xavier 90	FS1	13,813
6	9:30 pm	#6 Creighton 73 vs. #3 Seton Hall 81	FS1	13,813
Semifinals – Friday, March 11
7	7:00 pm	#4 Providence 68 vs. #1 Villanova 76	FS1	17,130
8	9:30 pm	#3 Seton Hall 87 vs. #2 Xavier 83	FS1	17,130
Championship – Saturday, March 12
9	5:30 pm	#3 Seton Hall 69 vs. #1 Villanova 67	FOX	19,812
*Game times in Eastern Time. Tournament seed in parentheses. #-Rankings denote Associated Press Poll ranking.

==== Bracket ====
First round March 9
8	Georgetown	70
9	DePaul	53
7	Marquette	101
10	St. John's	93

Quarterfinals; March 10
1	Villanova	81
8	Georgetown	67
4	Providence	74
5	Butler	60
2	Xavier	90
7	Marquette	72
3	Seton Hall	81
6	Creighton	73

Semifinals; March 11
1	Villanova	76
4	Providence	68
2	Xavier	83
3	Seton Hall	87

Championship; March 12
1	Villanova	67
3	Seton Hall	69

=== NCAA tournament ===
The Big East Conference had five bids to the 2016 NCAA Division I men's basketball tournament.

Seed	Region	School	First Four	Round of 64	Round of 32	Sweet 16	Elite Eight	Final Four	Championship
2	South	Villanova		(15) UNC Asheville - W, 86–56	(7) Iowa - W, 87–68	(3) Miami (FL) - W, 92–69	(1) Kansas - W, 64–59	(2) Oklahoma - W, 95–51	(1) North Carolina - W, 77–74
2	East	Xavier		(15) Weber State - W, 71–53	(7) Wisconsin - L, 63–66				
6	Midwest	Seton Hall		(11) Gonzaga - L, 52–68					
9	Midwest	Butler		(8) Texas Tech - W, 71–61	(1) Virginia - L, 69–77				
9	Midwest	Providence		(8) USC - W, 70–69	(1) North Carolina - L, 66–85				
		W–L (%):	0–0 (–)	4–1 (.800)	1–3 (.250)	1-0 (1.000)	1–0 (1.000)	1–0 (1.000)	1–0 (1.000) Total: 9-4 (.692)

=== National Invitational tournament ===
Creighton earned the sole NIT bid for the conference.

Seed	Bracket	School	First round	Second round	Quarterfinals	Semifinals	Finals
4	St. Bonaventure	Creighton	(5) Alabama - W, 72–54	(8) Wagner - W, 87–54	(2) BYU - L, 82–88		
		W–L (%):	1–0 (1.000)	1–0 (1.000)	0–1 (.000)	0–0 (–)	0–0 (–) Total: 2–1 (.667)
