= 2015–16 St. John's Red Storm men's basketball team =

American college basketball season

2015–16 St. John's Red Storm men's basketball
- Conference: Big East Conference
- Record: 8–24 (1–17 Big East)
- Head coach: Chris Mullin (1st season)
- Associate head coach: Barry Rohrssen
- Assistant coaches: Matt Abdelmassih; Greg St. Jean
- Home arena: Carnesecca Arena; Madison Square Garden

2015–16 Big East men's basketball standings
| | Conf. | | | | Overall |
| Team | W | | L | PCT | W | | L | PCT |
|---|---|---|---|---|---|---|---|---|
| No. 6 Villanova | 16 | – | 2 | .889 | 35 | – | 5 | .875 |
| No. 9 Xavier | 14 | – | 4 | .778 | 28 | – | 5 | .848 |
| No. 20 Seton Hall † | 12 | – | 6 | .667 | 25 | – | 9 | .735 |
| Providence | 10 | – | 8 | .556 | 24 | – | 11 | .686 |
| Butler | 10 | – | 8 | .556 | 22 | – | 11 | .667 |
| Creighton | 9 | – | 9 | .500 | 20 | – | 15 | .571 |
| Marquette | 8 | – | 10 | .444 | 20 | – | 13 | .606 |
| Georgetown | 7 | – | 11 | .389 | 15 | – | 18 | .455 |
| DePaul | 3 | – | 15 | .167 | 9 | – | 22 | .290 |
| St. John's | 1 | – | 17 | .056 | 8 | – | 24 | .250 |
† 2016 Big East tournament winner Rankings from AP poll

The 2015–16 St. John's Red Storm men's basketball team represented St. John's University during the 2015–16 NCAA Division I men's basketball season. They were coached by alumni and Naismith Memorial Basketball Hall of Fame member Chris Mullin in his first year at the school. St. John's home games were played at Carnesecca Arena and Madison Square Garden and was a member of the Big East Conference.

They finished the season with a record of 8–24, 1–17 in Big East play to finish in last place in conference. They lost to Marquette in the first round of the Big East tournament.

== Previous season ==
The Red Storm finished the 2014–15 season with a record of 21–12, 10–8 in Big East play to finish in fifth place in conference. They lost in the quarterfinals of the Big East tournament to Providence. They received an at-large bid to the NCAA tournament where they lost in the second round to San Diego State.

== Offseason ==
=== Departures ===
| Name | Number | Pos. | Height | Weight | Year | Hometown | Notes |
|---|---|---|---|---|---|---|---|
| Jamal Branch | 0 | G | 6'3" | 169 | Senior | Kansas City, Missouri | Graduated |
| Phil Greene | 1 | G | 6'2" | 187 | Senior | Chicago, Illinois | Graduated |
| Myles Stewart | 2 | G | 6'5" | 180 | Freshman | Los Angeles, California | Transferred to Arizona State |
| D'Angelo Harrison | 11 | G | 6'4" | 202 | Senior | Missouri City, Texas | Graduated |
| Chris Obekpa | 12 | F/C | 6'10" | 236 | Junior | Makurdi, Nigeria | Transferred to UNLV |
| Sir'Dominic Pointer | 15 | G/F | 6'5" | 192 | Senior | Detroit, Michigan | Graduated; Drafted in 2015 NBA draft |
| Jay Henderson | 22 | G | 6'5" | 180 | Freshman | Orlando, Florida | Transferred to Louisville |
| Rysheed Jordan | 23 | G | 6'4" | 193 | Sophomore | Philadelphia, Pennsylvania | Drafted in 2015 NBA Development League Draft |
| Adonis De La Rosa | 31 | C | 7'0" | 322 | Freshman | Bronx, New York | Transferred to Williston State |
| Joey De La Rosa | 34 | C | 6'11" | 249 | Senior | Bronx, New York | Transferred to LU–Belleville |
| Khadim Ndiaye | 35 | F | 6'6" | 195 | Senior | Queens, New York | Graduated |

=== 2015 recruiting class ===
College recruiting information
| Name | Hometown | School | Height | Weight | Commit date |
|---|---|---|---|---|---|
| Marcus LoVett Jr. PG | Fort Wayne, ID | Morgan Park High School | 6 ft 0 in (1.83 m) | 180 lb (82 kg) | May 21, 2015 |
| Marcus LoVett Jr. PG | Recruit ratings: Scout: Rivals: 247Sports: (80) | | | | |
| Kassoum Yakwe; PF | Bamako, Mali | Our Savior New American (N.Y) | 6 ft 7 in (2.01 m) | 205 lb (93 kg) | Aug 23, 2015 |
| Kassoum Yakwe; PF | Recruit ratings: Scout: Rivals: 247Sports: (80) | | | | |
| Yankuba Sima; C | Girona, Spain | Elev8 Sports Institute | 6 ft 11 in (2.11 m) | 215 lb (98 kg) | Apr 13, 2015 |
| Yankuba Sima; C | Recruit ratings: Scout: Rivals: 247Sports: (79) | | | | |
| Malik Ellison; SG | Voorhees, NJ | Life Center Academy | 6 ft 6 in (1.98 m) | 205 lb (93 kg) | May 1, 2015 |
| Malik Ellison; SG | Recruit ratings: Scout: Rivals: 247Sports: (77) | | | | |
| Federico Mussini; PG | Reggio Emilia, Italy | Liceo Scientifico Aldo Moro | 6 ft 1 in (1.85 m) | 160 lb (73 kg) | Jun 29, 2015 |
| Federico Mussini; PG | Recruit ratings: Scout: 247Sports: (NR) | | | | |
Overall recruit ranking:
Note: In many cases, Scout, Rivals, 247Sports, On3, and ESPN may conflict in their listings of height and weight.; In these cases, the average was taken. ESPN grades are on a 100-point scale.; Sources: "2015 Team Ranking". Rivals.

=== Transfer additions ===
| Name | Pos. | Height | Weight | Year | Hometown | Notes |
|---|---|---|---|---|---|---|
| Durand Johnson | G/F | 6'6" | 210 | Graduate student | Baltimore, Maryland | grad student transfer from Pittsburgh (1 yr immediate eligibility) |
| Ron Mvouika | G | 6'6" | 210 | Graduate student | Paris, France | grad student transfer from Missouri State (1 yr immediate eligibility) |
| Tariq Owens | F | 6'11" | 190 | Sophomore | Odenton, MD | transfer from Tennessee (3 yr eligibility remaining) |
| Darien Williams | F | 6'8" | 225 | Junior | Cerritos, California | junior college transfer from City College of San Francisco (2 yrs immediate eligibility) |

=== 2016 Recruiting class ===
College recruiting information (2016)
| Name | Hometown | School | Height | Weight | Commit date |
|---|---|---|---|---|---|
| Shamorie Ponds; PG | Brooklyn, NY | Thomas Jefferson High School | 6 ft 1 in (1.85 m) | 180 lb (82 kg) | Sep 29, 2015 |
| Shamorie Ponds; PG | Recruit ratings: Scout: Rivals: 247Sports: (88) | | | | |
| Richard Freudenberg; SF | Munich, Germany | Bayern Munich | 6 ft 8 in (2.03 m) | 190 lb (86 kg) | Feb 4, 2016 |
| Richard Freudenberg; SF | Recruit ratings: Scout: Rivals: 247Sports: (NR) | | | | |
Overall recruit ranking:
Note: In many cases, Scout, Rivals, 247Sports, On3, and ESPN may conflict in their listings of height and weight.; In these cases, the average was taken. ESPN grades are on a 100-point scale.; Sources: "2016 Team Ranking". Rivals.

== Roster ==
2015–16 St. John's Red Storm men's basketball team
Players
Coaches

| Pos. | # | Name | Height | Weight | Year | Previous school | Hometown |
|---|---|---|---|---|---|---|---|
| G | 0 | Malik Ellison | 6 ft 6 in (1.98 m) | 205 lb (93 kg) | Fr | Life Center Academy | Voorhees, NJ |
| F | 1 | Amar Alibegović | 6 ft 9 in (2.06 m) | 235 lb (107 kg) | So | Istituto Tecnico Minerva | Rome, Italy |
| F | 2 | Christian Jones | 6 ft 7 in (2.01 m) | 230 lb (104 kg) | RS Jr | IMG Academy | Arlington, TX |
| G | 3 | Marcus LoVett Jr. (redshirt) | 6 ft 0 in (1.83 m) | 180 lb (82 kg) | Fr | Morgan Park | Fort Wayne, IN |
| G | 4 | Federico Mussini | 6 ft 1 in (1.85 m) | 160 lb (73 kg) | Fr | Liceo Scientifico Aldo Moro | Reggio Emilia, Italy |
| G/F | 5 | Durand Johnson | 6 ft 6 in (1.98 m) | 210 lb (95 kg) | GS | Pittsburgh | Baltimore, MD |
| G | 10 | Felix Balamou | 6 ft 4 in (1.93 m) | 205 lb (93 kg) | Sr | Our Savior New American | Conakry, Guinea |
| F | 11 | Tariq Owens (redshirt) | 6 ft 11 in (2.11 m) | 190 lb (86 kg) | So | Tennessee | Odenton, MD |
| G | 12 | Elijah Holifield (W) | 6 ft 2 in (1.88 m) | 180 lb (82 kg) | Fr | Pace Academy | Atlanta, GA |
| F | 14 | Kassoum Yakwe | 6 ft 7 in (2.01 m) | 205 lb (93 kg) | Fr | Our Savior New American | Bamako, Mali |
| G | 23 | Abdul Dial (W) | 6 ft 3 in (1.91 m) | 195 lb (88 kg) | Fr | Cardinal Newman | West Palm Beach, FL |
| G/F | 24 | Ron Mvouika | 6 ft 6 in (1.98 m) | 210 lb (95 kg) | GS | Missouri State | Paris, France |
| C | 35 | Yankuba Sima | 6 ft 11 in (2.11 m) | 215 lb (98 kg) | Fr | Elev8 Sports Institute | Girona, Spain |
| F | 45 | Darien Williams | 6 ft 8 in (2.03 m) | 225 lb (102 kg) | Jr | City College of San Francisco | Cerritos, CA |

Head coach

- Chris Mullin (St. John's)

Assistant coach(es)

- Barry Rohrssen
- Matt Abdelmassih
- Greg St. Jean
- Mitch Richmond (special asst.)

Legend

- (C) Team captain
- (S) Suspended
- (I) Ineligible
- (W) Walk-on
- Injured
- Current redshirt

Roster

== Schedule and results ==
| Date time, TV | Rank^{#} | Opponent^{#} | Result | Record | High points | High rebounds | High assists | Site (attendance) city, state |
Exhibition
| Nov 4, 2015*; 7:00 pm | | St. Thomas Aquinas | L 58–90 | | 16 – Mussini | 11 – Jones | 3 – Tied | Carnesecca Arena (4,058); Queens, NY |
| Nov 7, 2015*; 4:00 pm | | Sonoma State | W 64–46 | | 16 – Sima | 16 – Sima | 1 – Tied | Carnesecca Arena (3,902); Queens, NY |
Non-conference regular season
| Nov 13, 2015*; 6:00 pm, FS1 | | Wagner | W 66–57 | 1–0 | 18 – Mussini | 8 – Tied | 3 – Tied | Carnesecca Arena (4,677); Queens, NY |
| Nov 16, 2015*; 7:00 pm, FS1 | | UMBC; Maui Invitational opening round | W 75–53 | 2–0 | 18 – Mussini | 9 – Sima | 6 – Mussini | Carnesecca Arena (4,098); Queens, NY |
| Nov 19, 2015*; 7:00 pm, FS1 | | Rutgers; Gavitt Tipoff Games | W 61–59 | 3–0 | 13 – Tied | 11 – Balamou | 7 – Balamou | Carnesecca Arena (4,540); Queens, NY |
| Nov 23, 2015*; 2:30 pm, ESPN2 | | vs. No. 19 Vanderbilt; Maui Invitational quarterfinals | L 55–92 | 3–1 | 14 – Mussini | 5 – Jones | 2 – Mussini | Lahaina Civic Center (2,400); Maui, HI |
| Nov 24, 2015*; 2:00 pm, ESPN2 | | vs. No. 13 Indiana; Maui Invitational consolation second round | L 73–83 | 3–2 | 17 – Tied | 7 – Sima | 4 – Balamou | Lahaina Civic Center (2,400); Maui, HI |
| Nov 25, 2015*; 2:30 pm, ESPNU | | vs. Chaminade; Maui Invitational 7th place game | W 100–93 | 4–2 | 24 – Mussini | 11 – Jones | 6 – Mussini | Lahaina Civic Center (2,400); Maui, HI |
| Dec 2, 2015*; 7:00 pm | | at Fordham | L 57–73 | 4–3 | 14 – Balamou | 5 – Tied | 5 – Balamou | Rose Hill Gymnasium (3,068); Bronx, NY |
| Dec 6, 2015*; 11 am, FS1 | | St. Francis Brooklyn; Madison Square Garden Holiday Festival | W 63–56 | 5–3 | 19 – Johnson | 10 – Sima | 6 – Mussini | Madison Square Garden (7,196); New York City, NY |
| Dec 9, 2015*; 5:00 pm, FS1 | | Niagara | W 48–44 | 6–3 | 11 – Mussini | 8 – Mvouika | 4 – Balamou | Carnesecca Arena (5,602); Queens, NY |
| Dec 13, 2015*; 12:00 pm, FS1 | | Syracuse | W 84–72 | 7–3 | 17 – Mussini | 9 – Alibegovic | 5 – Mvouika | Madison Square Garden (13,473); New York City, NY |
| Dec 18, 2015*; 7:00 pm, FS1 | | Incarnate Word | L 51–73 | 7–4 | 15 – Johnson | 6 – Johnson | 3 – Tied | Carnesecca Arena (4,120); Queens, NY |
| Dec 20, 2015*; 12:00 pm, FS1 | | NJIT | L 74–83 | 7–5 | 20 – Mussini | 14 – Sima | 4 – Mvouika | Carnesecca Arena (4,414); Queens, NY |
| Dec 22, 2015*; 9:00 pm, CBSSN | | vs. No. 25 South Carolina; Hall of Fame Shootout | L 61–75 | 7–6 | 16 – Johnson | 5 – Johnson | 3 – Mussini | Mohegan Sun Arena (2,355); Uncasville, CT |
Big East regular season
| Dec 31, 2015; 2:00 pm, FS1 | | Creighton | L 70–80 | 7–7 (0–1) | 17 – Ellison | 9 – Jones | 5 – Balamou | Carnesecca Arena (4,633); Queens, NY |
| Jan 2, 2016; 3:30 pm, FS1 | | at No. 12 Providence; Big East New Year's Marathon | L 65–83 | 7–8 (0–2) | 14 – Sima | 8 – Sima | 3 – Balamou | Dunkin' Donuts Center (12,410); Providence, RI |
| Jan 6, 2016; 9:00 pm, FS1 | | No. 10 Xavier | L 66–74 | 7–9 (0–3) | 19 – Tied | 5 – Tied | 3 – Johnson | Carnesecca Arena (4,168); Queens, NY |
| Jan 9, 2016; 2:00 pm, FSN | | at Marquette | L 75–81 | 7–10 (0–4) | 18 – Johnson | 11 – Yakwe | 5 – Mvouika | BMO Harris Bradley Center (13,468); Milwaukee, WI |
| Jan 13, 2016; 6:30 pm, FS1 | | Georgetown | L 73–93 | 7–11 (0–5) | 15 – Mvouika | 8 – Yakwe | 4 – Mussini | Madison Square Garden (7,837); New York City, NY |
| Jan 16, 2016; 12:00 pm, FS1 | | at No. 23 Butler | L 58–78 | 7–12 (0–6) | 14 – Mussini | 8 – Yakwe | 2 – Tied | Hinkle Fieldhouse (9,144); Indianapolis, IN |
| Jan 24, 2016; 3:45 pm, CBSSN | | Marquette | L 73–78 | 7–13 (0–7) | 20 – Johnson | 8 – Yakwe | 3 – Tied | Carnesecca Arena (1,032); Queens, NY |
| Jan 27, 2016; 7:00 pm, FS1 | | at Seton Hall | L 60–79 | 7–14 (0–8) | 15 – Jones | 10 – Yakwe | 6 – Ellison | Prudential Center (6,767); Newark, NJ |
| Jan 31, 2016; 12:00 pm, FOX | | No. 6 Villanova | L 53–68 | 7–15 (0–9) | 13 – Johnson | 10 – Mvouika | 6 – Mvouika | Madison Square Garden (12,713); New York City, NY |
| Feb 3, 2016; 6:30 pm, FS1 | | at No. 6 Xavier | L 83–90 | 7–16 (0–10) | 20 – Balamou | 7 – Yakwe | 3 – Tied | Cintas Center (10,250); Cincinnati, OH |
| Feb 6, 2016; 4:30 pm, FSN | | Butler | L 56–89 | 7–17 (0–11) | 11 – Yakwe | 5 – Sima | 3 – Sima | Carnesecca Arena (5,602); Queens, NY |
| Feb 8, 2016; 7:00 pm, FS1 | | at Georgetown | L 67–92 | 7–18 (0–12) | 14 – Jones | 9 – Jones | 3 – Ellison | Verizon Center (5,369); Washington, D.C. |
| Feb 13, 2016; 8:00 pm, CBSSN | | at No. 1 Villanova | L 63–73 | 7–19 (0–13) | 18 – Alibegovic | 6 – Alibegovic | 5 – Ellison | Wells Fargo Center (18,052); Philadelphia, PA |
| Feb 17, 2016; 8:00 pm, CBSSN | | DePaul | W 80–65 | 8–19 (1–13) | 18 – Johnson | 11 – Yakwe | 5 – Balamou | Carnesecca Arena (5,010); Queens, NY |
| Feb 21, 2016; 12:00 pm, FS1 | | Seton Hall | L 61–62 | 8–20 (1–14) | 16 – Yakwe | 15 – Yakwe | 3 – Ellison | Madison Square Garden (13,204); New York City, NY |
| Feb 25, 2016; 9:00 pm, FS1 | | at DePaul | L 75–83 | 8–21 (1–15) | 20 – Mvouika | 6 – Tied | 7 – Balamou | Allstate Arena (4,817); Rosemont, IL |
| Feb 28, 2016; 2:30 pm, FS1 | | at Creighton | L 59–100 | 8–22 (1–16) | 17 – Jones | 6 – Johnson | 4 – Tied | CenturyLink Center (17,351); Omaha, NE |
| Mar 5, 2016; 12:30 pm, FS1 | | Providence | L 76–90 | 8–23 (1–17) | 15 – Johnson | 12 – Jones | 5 – Tied | Madison Square Garden (10,079); New York City, NY |
Big East tournament
| Mar 9, 2016; 9:30 pm, FS1 | | vs. Marquette; First round | L 93–101 | 8–24 | 29 – Jones | 7 – Jones | 5 – Ellison | Madison Square Garden (12,604); New York City, NY |
*Non-conference game. ^{#}Rankings from AP Poll. (#) Tournament seedings in parentheses. All times are in Eastern Time.
