= 2015–16 Providence Friars men's basketball team =

American college basketball season

2015–16 Providence Friars men's basketball
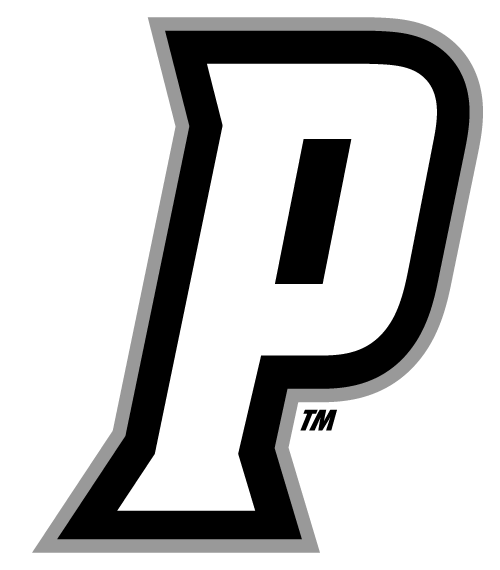

NCAA tournament, Second Round
- Conference: Big East Conference
- Record: 24–11 (10–8 Big East)
- Head coach: Ed Cooley (5th season)
- Assistant coaches: Andre LaFleur; Brian Blaney; Jeff Battle
- Home arena: Dunkin' Donuts Center

2015–16 Big East men's basketball standings
	Conf.				Overall
Team	W		L	PCT	W		L	PCT
No. 6 Villanova	16	–	2	.889	35	–	5	.875
No. 9 Xavier	14	–	4	.778	28	–	5	.848
No. 20 Seton Hall †	12	–	6	.667	25	–	9	.735
Providence	10	–	8	.556	24	–	11	.686
Butler	10	–	8	.556	22	–	11	.667
Creighton	9	–	9	.500	20	–	15	.571
Marquette	8	–	10	.444	20	–	13	.606
Georgetown	7	–	11	.389	15	–	18	.455
DePaul	3	–	15	.167	9	–	22	.290
St. John's	1	–	17	.056	8	–	24	.250
† 2016 Big East tournament winner Rankings from AP poll

The 2015–16 Providence Friars men's basketball team represented Providence College in the 2015–16 NCAA Division I men's basketball season. The Friars, led by fifth-year head coach Ed Cooley, played their home games at the Dunkin' Donuts Center, and were members of the Big East Conference. They finished the season 24–11, 10–8 in Big East play to finish in a tie for fourth place. They defeated Butler in the quarterfinals of the Big East tournament to advance to the semifinals where they lost to Villanova. They received an at-large bid to the NCAA tournament as a #9 seed where they defeated USC in the first round, then lost to North Carolina in the second round.

== Previous season ==
The Friars finished the 2014–15 season 22–12 overall and 11–7 in Big East play to finish in fourth place. They defeated St. John's in the quarterfinals and lost to Villanova in the semifinals of the Big East tournament. The Friars received an at-large bid to the NCAA tournament as a #6 seed, losing to Dayton in the second round.

== Off season ==
=== Departures ===
Name	Number	Pos.	Height	Weight	Year	Hometown	Notes
Ted Bancroft	22	G	6'6"	215	RS Senior	Marion, MA	Graduated
Paschal Chukwu	13	C	7'2"	226	Freshman	Westport, CT	Transferred to Syracuse
Carson Desrosiers	33	F	7'0"	250	Senior	Windham, NH	Graduated
Tyler Harris	25	F	6'9"	223	RS Junior	Dix Hills, NY	Graduated, transferred to Auburn
LaDontae Henton	23	F	6'6"	215	Senior	Lansing, MI	Graduated/Went undrafted in 2015 NBA draft

== Incoming recruits ==
College recruiting
Name	Hometown	School	Height	Weight	Commit date
Ryan Fazekas; PF	Michigan City, IN	Marquette Catholic High School	6 ft 7 in (2.01 m)	180 lb (82 kg)	Oct 29, 2013
Ryan Fazekas; PF	Recruit ratings: Scout: Rivals: (80)				
Drew Edwards; SG	Towson, MD	Calvert Hall College High School	6 ft 3 in (1.91 m)	170 lb (77 kg)	Aug 29, 2014
Drew Edwards; SG	Recruit ratings: Scout: Rivals: (80)				
Ricky Council II; SF	Durham, NC	Moravian Prep	6 ft 4 in (1.93 m)	185 lb (84 kg)	Feb 24, 2015
Ricky Council II; SF	Recruit ratings: Rivals: (POST)				
Quadree Smith; C	Temple Hills, Maryland	IMG Academy	6 ft 7 in (2.01 m)	290 lb (130 kg)	Jun 10, 2015
Quadree Smith; C	Recruit ratings: Rivals: (POST)				
Overall recruit ranking:
Note: In many cases, Scout, Rivals, 247Sports, On3, and ESPN may conflict in their listings of height and weight.; In these cases, the average was taken. ESPN grades are on a 100-point scale.; Sources: "2015 Team Ranking". Rivals.

== Roster ==
2015–16 Providence Friars men's basketball team
Players
Coaches

Pos.	#	Name	Height	Weight	Year	Previous school	Hometown
F	0	Ben Bentil	6 ft 9 in (2.06 m)	235 lb (107 kg)	So	St. Andrew's School	Wilmington, Delaware
G	3	Kris Dunn	6 ft 4 in (1.93 m)	220 lb (100 kg)	RS Jr	New London High School	New London, Connecticut
F	5	Rodney Bullock	6 ft 8 in (2.03 m)	225 lb (102 kg)	RS So	Kecoughtan High School	Hampton, Virginia
F	10	Quadree Smith	6 ft 8 in (2.03 m)	285 lb (129 kg)	Fr	IMG Academy	Temple Hills, Maryland
G	12	Casey Woodring (W)	6 ft 2 in (1.88 m)	185 lb (84 kg)	Jr	Cushing Academy	Darien, Connecticut
G	14	Tyree Chambers	6 ft 2 in (1.88 m)	182 lb (83 kg)	So	Graf-Münster-Gymnasium	Bayreuth, Germany
F	21	Jalen Lindsay	6 ft 7 in (2.01 m)	210 lb (95 kg)	So	Huntington Prep	Murfreesboro, Tennessee
G	22	Ricky Council II	6 ft 5 in (1.96 m)	200 lb (91 kg)	Fr	Moravian Prep	Durham, North Carolina
G	24	Kyron Cartwright	5 ft 11 in (1.8 m)	185 lb (84 kg)	So	Compton High School	Compton, California
F	25	Drew Edwards	6 ft 3 in (1.91 m)	185 lb (84 kg)	Fr	Calvert Hall	Perry Hall, Maryland
G	32	Junior Lomomba	6 ft 5 in (1.96 m)	205 lb (93 kg)	RS Jr	Madison Memorial	Montreal, Quebec
F	34	Tom Planek (W)	6 ft 6 in (1.98 m)	205 lb (93 kg)	So	Fenwick High School	Oak Park, Illinois
G	35	Ryan Fazekas	6 ft 8 in (2.03 m)	205 lb (93 kg)	Fr	Marquette Catholic High School	Chesterton, Indiana

Head coach

- Ed Cooley (Stonehill)

Assistant coach(es)

- Andre LaFleur (Northeastern)
- Brian Blaney (Roanoke)
- Jeff Battle (Marshall)

Legend

- (C) Team captain
- (S) Suspended
- (I) Ineligible
- (W) Walk-on
- Injured
- Current redshirt

Roster

== Schedule ==
Date time, TV	Rank^{#}	Opponent^{#}	Result	Record	Site (attendance) city, state
Exhibition
Oct 31, 2015*; 2:00 pm		Stonehill	W 92–76		Dunkin' Donuts Center; Providence, RI
Non-conference regular season
Nov 14, 2015*; 7:00 pm, FSN		Harvard	W 76–64	1–0	Dunkin' Donuts Center (9,477); Providence, RI
Nov 18, 2015*; 7:00 pm, FS1		Illinois; Gavitt Tipoff Games	W 60–59	2–0	Dunkin' Donuts Center (8,069); Providence, RI
Nov 21, 2015*; 7:00 pm, FSN		Brown; Ocean State Cup	W 94–73	3–0	Dunkin' Donuts Center (8,706); Providence, RI
Nov 23, 2015*; 6:30 pm, FS1		NJIT	W 83–76	4–0	Dunkin' Donuts Center (5,009); Providence, RI
Nov 26, 2015*; 8:00 pm, ESPNU		vs. Evansville; Wooden Legacy quarterfinals	W 74–64	5–0	Titan Gym (2,460); Fullerton, CA
Nov 27, 2015*; 10:30 pm, ESPN2		vs. No. 11 Arizona; Wooden Legacy semifinals	W 69–65	6–0	Titan Gym (2,873); Fullerton, CA
Nov 29, 2015*; 9:00 pm, ESPN2		vs. No. 3 Michigan State; Wooden Legacy championship	L 64–77	6–1	Honda Center (4,393); Anaheim, CA
Dec 2, 2015*; 7:00 pm, FSN	No. 23	Hartford	W 89–66	7–1	Dunkin' Donuts Center (5,169); Providence, RI
Dec 5, 2015*; 7:00 pm, ESPNU	No. 23	at Rhode Island; Ocean State Cup	W 74–72	8–1	Ryan Center (7,678); Kingston, RI
Dec 9, 2015*; 7:00 pm, FS1	No. 15	Boston College; Wooden Legacy Non-Bracket game	W 66–51	9–1	Dunkin' Donuts Center (8,425); Providence, RI
Dec 12, 2015*; 12:00 pm, FS1	No. 15	Bryant; Ocean State Cup	W 74–67	10–1	Dunkin' Donuts Center (7,369); Providence, RI
Dec 19, 2015*; 8:00 pm, FSN	No. 14	Rider	W 73–65	11–1	Dunkin' Donuts Center (7,852); Providence, RI
Dec 21, 2015*; 7:00 pm, CBSSN	No. 10	at Massachusetts	W 90–66	12–1	Mullins Center (4,411); Amherst, MA
Big East regular season
Dec 31, 2015; 2:30 pm, CBSSN	No. 12	at No. 9 Butler	W 81–73	13–1 (1–0)	Hinkle Fieldhouse (9,100); Indianapolis, IN
Jan 2, 2016; 3:30 pm, FS1	No. 12	St. John's; Big East New Year's Marathon	W 83–65	14–1 (2–0)	Dunkin' Donuts Center (12,410); Providence, RI
Jan 5, 2016; 7:00 pm, FS1	No. 8	Marquette	L 64–65	14–2 (2–1)	Dunkin' Donuts Center (10,446); Providence, RI
Jan 12, 2016; 8:30 pm, FS1	No. 12	at Creighton	W 50–48	15–2 (3–1)	CenturyLink Center (17,073); Omaha, NE
Jan 16, 2016; 4:30 pm, FS1	No. 12	Seton Hall	L 72–81	15–3 (3–2)	Dunkin' Donuts Center (11,148); Providence, RI
Jan 19, 2016; 6:30 pm, FS1	No. 16	No. 18 Butler	W 71–68	16–3 (4–2)	Dunkin' Donuts Center (10,918); Providence, RI
Jan 23, 2016; 12:00 pm, FOX	No. 16	at No. 4 Villanova	W 82–76	17–3 (5–2)	Wells Fargo Center (7,191); Philadelphia, PA
Jan 26, 2016; 8:30 pm, FS1	No. 10	No. 7 Xavier	L 68–75	17–4 (5–3)	Dunkin' Donuts Center (12,804); Providence, RI
Jan 30, 2016; 8:00 pm, FS1	No. 10	at Georgetown	W 73–69	18–4 (6–3)	Verizon Center (14,481); Washington, D.C.
Feb 2, 2016; 9:00 pm, FS1	No. 11	at DePaul	L 70–77	18–5 (6–4)	Allstate Arena (5,114); Rosemont, IL
Feb 6, 2016; 2:30 pm, FS1	No. 11	No. 4 Villanova	L 60–72	18–6 (6–5)	Dunkin' Donuts Center (12,883); Providence, RI
Feb 10, 2016; 7:00 pm, CBSSN	No. 20	at Marquette	L 91–96	18–7 (6–6)	BMO Harris Bradley Center (14,616); Milwaukee, WI
Feb 13, 2016; 12:07 pm, FOX	No. 20	Georgetown	W 75–72	19–7 (7–6)	Dunkin' Donuts Center (12,582); Providence, RI
Feb 17, 2016; 7:00 pm, FS1	No. 23	at No. 8 Xavier	L 74–85	19–8 (7–7)	Cintas Center (10,336); Cincinnati, OH
Feb 25, 2016; 7:00 pm, FS1		at Seton Hall	L 52–70	19–9 (7–8)	Prudential Center (8,600); Newark, NJ
Feb 27 2016; 4:00 pm, CBSSN		DePaul	W 87–66	20–9 (8–8)	Dunkin' Donuts Center (12,435); Providence, RI
Mar 2, 2016; 9:00 pm, CBSSN		Creighton	W 70–66	21–9 (9–8)	Dunkin' Donuts Center (9,252); Providence, RI
Mar 5, 2016; 12:30 pm, FS1		at St. John's	W 90–76	22–9 (10–8)	Madison Square Garden (10,079); New York, NY
Big East tournament
Mar 10, 2016; 2:30 pm, FS1	(4)	vs. (5) Butler; Quarterfinals	W 74–60	23–9	Madison Square Garden (14,869); New York City, NY
Mar 11, 2016; 6:30 pm, FS1	(4)	vs. (1) No. 3 Villanova; Semifinals	L 68–76	23–10	Madison Square Garden (17,130); New York City, NY
NCAA tournament
Mar 17, 2016*; 9:50 pm, TBS	(9 E)	vs. (8 E) USC; First Round	W 70–69	24–10	PNC Arena (17,387); Raleigh, NC
Mar 19, 2016*; 9:40 pm, TBS	(9 E)	vs. (1 E) No. 3 North Carolina; Second Round	L 66–85	24–11	PNC Arena (19,433); Raleigh, NC
*Non-conference game. ^{#}Rankings from AP Poll. (#) Tournament seedings in parentheses. E=East Region. All times are in Eastern Time.

== Rankings ==
Ranking movement Legend: ██ Increase in ranking. ██ Decrease in ranking. ██ Not ranked the previous week. RV=Others receiving votes.
Poll	Pre	Wk 2	Wk 3	Wk 4	Wk 5	Wk 6	Wk 7	Wk 8	Wk 9	Wk 10	Wk 11	Wk 12	Wk 13	Wk 14	Wk 15	Wk 16	Wk 17	Wk 18	Post	Final
AP	RV	RV	RV	23	15	14	10	12	8	12	16	10	11	20	23	RV	NR	RV	RV	N/A
Coaches	RV	RV	NR	24	18	14	14	13	9	12	17	10	11	17	20	24	RV	RV	RV	RV
