= 2015–16 DePaul Blue Demons men's basketball team =

American college basketball season

2015–16 DePaul Blue Demons men's basketball
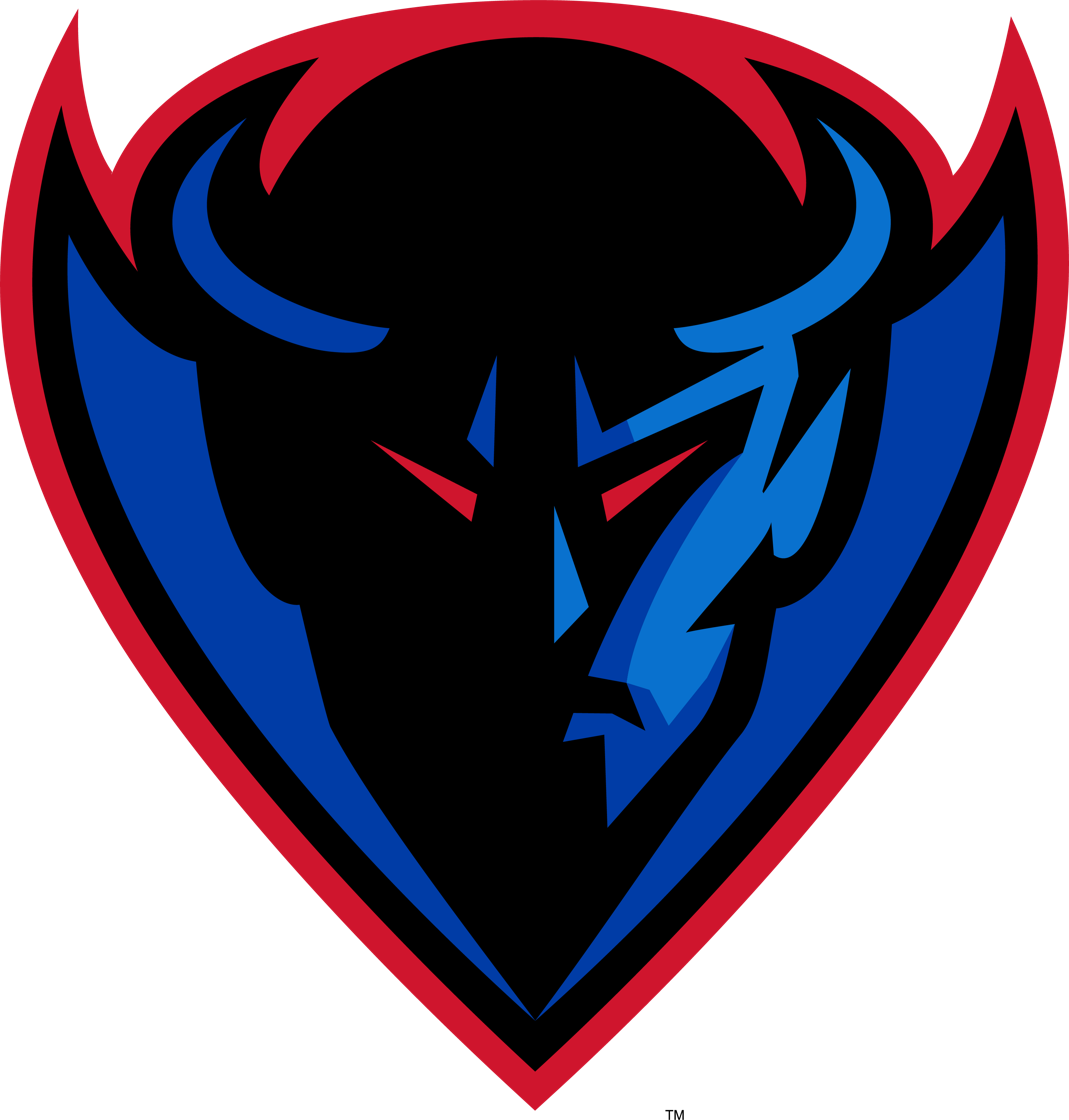
- Conference: Big East Conference
- Record: 9–22 (3–15 Big East)
- Head coach: Dave Leitao (1st, 4th overall season)
- Assistant coaches: Rick Carter; Billy Garrett; Patrick Sellers
- Home arena: Allstate Arena; McGrath–Phillips Arena

2015–16 Big East men's basketball standings
	Conf.				Overall
Team	W		L	PCT	W		L	PCT
No. 6 Villanova	16	–	2	.889	35	–	5	.875
No. 9 Xavier	14	–	4	.778	28	–	5	.848
No. 20 Seton Hall †	12	–	6	.667	25	–	9	.735
Providence	10	–	8	.556	24	–	11	.686
Butler	10	–	8	.556	22	–	11	.667
Creighton	9	–	9	.500	20	–	15	.571
Marquette	8	–	10	.444	20	–	13	.606
Georgetown	7	–	11	.389	15	–	18	.455
DePaul	3	–	15	.167	9	–	22	.290
St. John's	1	–	17	.056	8	–	24	.250
† 2016 Big East tournament winner Rankings from AP poll

The 2015–16 DePaul Blue Demons men's basketball team represented DePaul University during the 2015–16 NCAA Division I men's basketball season. They played their home games at the Allstate Arena, and were members of the Big East Conference. Dave Leitao returned to Chicago to lead the Blue Demons for the second time, following a three-year tenure from 2002–2005. They finished the season 9–22, 3–15 in Big East play to finish in ninth place. They lost to Georgetown in the first round of the Big East tournament.

== Previous season ==
The Blue Demons finished the 2014–15 season with record of 12–20 (6–12 Big East), tied for 7th in the conference. They were eliminated in the opening round of the 2015 Big East tournament. Following the season, head coach Oliver Purnell resigned and was replaced by Leitao.

== Departures ==
Name	Number	Pos.	Height	Weight	Year	Hometown	Notes
Forrest Robinson	11	F	6'10"	223	Senior	Ranger, TX	Graduated
Jamee Crockett	21	F	6'4"	202	Senior	Chicago, IL	Graduated
Durrell McDonald	25	G	6'2"	173	Junior	Las Vegas, NV	Transferred to Mercyhurst University
Greg Sequele	42	F	6'9"	215	Senior	Sainte-Rose, GP	Graduated

== Incoming recruits ==
College recruiting
Name	Hometown	School	Height	Weight	Commit date
Oumar Barry; PF	Arlington, VA	Bishop O'Connell	6 ft 9 in (2.06 m)	215 lb (98 kg)	Sep 17, 2014
Oumar Barry; PF	Recruit ratings: Scout: Rivals: 247Sports: ESPN:				
Elijah Cain; PG	Newark, NJ	St. Benedict's Preparatory	6 ft 5 in (1.96 m)	180 lb (82 kg)	Mar 11, 2015
Elijah Cain; PG	Recruit ratings: Scout: Rivals: 247Sports: ESPN:				
Develle Phillips; PF	Upper Marlboro, MD	Clinton Christian School	6 ft 8 in (2.03 m)	190 lb (86 kg)	Sep 4, 2014
Develle Phillips; PF	Recruit ratings: Scout: Rivals: 247Sports: ESPN:				
Overall recruit ranking:
Note: In many cases, Scout, Rivals, 247Sports, On3, and ESPN may conflict in their listings of height and weight.; In these cases, the average was taken. ESPN grades are on a 100-point scale.; Sources: "2015 DePaul Signees". Rivals.; "2015 DePaul Signees". ESPN.; "2015 Team Ranking". Rivals.

== Roster ==
2015–16 DePaul Blue Demons men's basketball team
Players
Coaches

Pos.	#	Name	Height	Weight	Year	Previous school	Hometown
G	0	R. J. Curington	6 ft 5 in (1.96 m)	200 lb (91 kg)	Jr	Oak Hill Academy	Dyer, IN
G	1	Darrick Wood	6 ft 5 in (1.96 m)	190 lb (86 kg)	Jr	Bridgton Academy; Hutchinson CC	Alexandria, VA
C	2	Tommy Hamilton IV	6 ft 11 in (2.11 m)	255 lb (116 kg)	Jr	IMG Academy	Chicago, IL
F	3	Rashaun Stimage	6 ft 8 in (2.03 m)	217 lb (98 kg)	Sr	Farragut; Daytona State College	Chicago, IL
F	4	Myke Henry	6 ft 6 in (1.98 m)	228 lb (103 kg)	RS Sr	Orr; Illinois	Chicago, IL
G	5	Billy Garrett Jr.	6 ft 6 in (1.98 m)	205 lb (93 kg)	Jr	Morgan Park	Chicago, IL
G	10	David Molinari	6 ft 0 in (1.83 m)	185 lb (84 kg)	Sr	Peoria Notre Dame; Illinois Wesleyan	Peoria, IL
G	11	Eli Cain	6 ft 6 in (1.98 m)	201 lb (91 kg)	Fr	St. Benedict's Prep	Willingboro, NJ
F	12	Develle Phillips	6 ft 9 in (2.06 m)	210 lb (95 kg)	Fr	Clinton Christian	Bowie, MD
G	13	Cory Dolins	6 ft 0 in (1.83 m)	182 lb (83 kg)	Sr	Niles West	Northbrook, IL
F	14	Frederick Scott	6 ft 7 in (2.01 m)	235 lb (107 kg)	Fr	Simeon	Munster, IN
G	15	Aaron Simpson	5 ft 11 in (1.8 m)	152 lb (69 kg)	Sr	North Chicago; Lincoln College	North Chicago, IL
G	23	Erten Gazi	6 ft 4 in (1.93 m)	200 lb (91 kg)	Fr	Istanbul Bostanci Doga College	Northern Cyprus
F	25	Oumar Barry	6 ft 10 in (2.08 m)	226 lb (103 kg)	Fr	Bishop O'Connell	Camp Springs, MD
F	30	Peter Ryckbosch	6 ft 10 in (2.08 m)	242 lb (110 kg)	RS Jr	St. Ignatius	Chicago, IL
F	32	David Leitao III (W)	6 ft 7 in (2.01 m)	220 lb (100 kg)	Jr	Rock Bridge; Peru State College	Virginia Beach, VA
F	33	Joe Hanel (W)	6 ft 7 in (2.01 m)	205 lb (93 kg)	So	Holy Family Catholic	Savage, MN

Head coach

- Dave Leitao (Northeastern)

Assistant coach(es)

- Rick Carter (Michigan State)
- Billy Garrett (Indianapolis)
- Patrick Sellers (Central Connecticut State)

Legend

- (C) Team captain
- (S) Suspended
- (I) Ineligible
- (W) Walk-on
- Injured
- Current redshirt

Roster
Last update: July 28, 2015

== Schedule ==
Date time, TV	Rank^{#}	Opponent^{#}	Result	Record	High points	High rebounds	High assists	Site (attendance) city, state
Exhibition
Nov 7, 2015*; 1:00 pm		Caldwell	W 82–52		13 – Hamilton IV	8 – Simpson	6 – Garrett Jr.	McGrath–Phillips Arena (1,230); Chicago, IL
Non-Conference regular season
Nov 14, 2015*; 8:00 pm, FSN		Western Michigan	W 69–63	1–0	18 – Garrett Jr.	7 – Hamilton IV/Stimage	4 – Garrett Jr.	McGrath–Phillips Arena (4,001); Chicago, IL
Nov 17, 2015*; 4:00 pm, ESPNU		at Penn State; Gavitt Tipoff Games	L 62–68	1–1	17 – Henry	9 – Hamilton IV/Henry	2 – Cain/Garrett Jr.	Bryce Jordan Center (5,023); University Park, PA
Nov 20, 2015*; 5:00 pm, CBSSN		vs. South Carolina; Paradise Jam First Round	L 61–76	1–2	14 – Wood	6 – Cain/Hamilton IV	4 – Garrett Jr./Simpson	Sports and Fitness Center (1,601); Saint Thomas, USVI
Nov 21, 2015*; 5:30 pm		vs. Florida State; Paradise Jam Consolation	L 67–83	1–3	20 – Simpson	6 – Cain	3 – Gazi	Sports and Fitness Center (2,205); Saint Thomas, USVI
Nov 23, 2015*; 12:30 pm, CBSSN		vs. Norfolk State; Paradise Jam 7th Place game	W 82–78	2–3	22 – Garrett Jr.	5 – Hamilton IV/Wood	7 – Garrett Jr.	Sports and Fitness Center (1,433); Saint Thomas, USVI
Dec 2, 2015*; 7:00 pm, CSN+		at UIC	W 82–55	3–3	17 – Henry	10 – Hamilton IV	6 – Garrett Jr.	UIC Pavilion (4,417); Chicago, IL
Dec 5, 2015*; 1:00 pm, FS1		Chicago State	W 96–72	4–3	20 – Cain	7 – Hailton IV	4 – Gazi/Simpson	Allstate Arena (5,215); Rosemont, IL
Dec 9, 2015*; 7:00 pm, ESPN3		at Drake	W 74–71	5–3	19 – Garrett Jr.	9 – Hamilton IV	4 – Wood	Knapp Center (3,262); Des Moines, IA
Dec 12, 2015*; 9:00 pm, FS1		Arkansas–Little Rock	L 44–66	5–4	16 – Henry	6 – Hamilton IV/Ryckbosch	2 – Garrett Jr.	McGrath–Phillips Arena (1,740); Chicago, IL
Dec 15, 2015*; 9:00 pm, FS1		at Stanford	L 60–79	5–5	19 – Garrett Jr.	5 – Hamilton IV	5 – Garrett Jr.	Maples Pavilion (4,912); Stanford, CA
Dec 19, 2015*; 1:00 pm, FS1		Northwestern	L 70–78 ^{OT}	5–6	24 – Henry	8 – Henry	5 – Gazi	Allstate Arena (6,351); Rosemont, IL
Dec 22, 2015*; 8:00 pm, FS1		No. 20 George Washington	W 82–61	6–6	20 – Garrett Jr.	8 – Henry	7 – Garrett Jr.	Allstate Arena (5,289); Rosemont, IL
Big East Conference regular season
Dec 30, 2015; 8:15 pm, FS1		Georgetown	L 58–70	6–7 (0–1)	21 – Garrett Jr.	7 – Hamilton IV	5 – Garrett Jr.	Allstate Arena (5,873); Rosemont, IL
Jan 2, 2016; 10:00 am, FS1		at Seton Hall; Big East New Year's Marathon	L 74–78	6–8 (0–2)	20 – Garrett Jr.	9 – Henry	8 – Garrett Jr.	Prudential Center (8,201); Newark, NJ
Jan 5, 2016; 7:00 pm, FSN		No. 18 Butler	L 72–77	6–9 (0–3)	22 – Henry	10 – Henry	5 – Wood	Allstate Arena (5,427); Rosemont, IL
Jan 9, 2016; 11:00 am, FS1		at Georgetown	L 63–74	6–10 (0–4)	16 – Garrett Jr.	5 – 3 tied	4 – Garrett Jr.	Verizon Center (8,435); Washington, D.C.
Jan 12, 2016; 5:30 pm, FS1		at No. 7 Xavier	L 64–84	6–11 (0–5)	16 – Henry	8 – Henry	4 – Garrett Jr.	Cintas Center (10,400); Cincinnati, OH
Jan 17, 2016; 12:30 pm, FS1		Creighton	L 80–91	6–12 (0–6)	21 – Cain/Henry	4 – Hamilton IV	4 – Garrett Jr.	Allstate Arena (5,534); Rosemont, IL
Jan 20, 2016; 7:00 pm, FS1		at Marquette	W 57–56	7–12 (1–6)	17 – Henry	12 – Henry	5 – Garrett, Jr.	BMO Harris Bradley Center (12,695); Milwaukee, WI
Jan 27, 2016; 6:00 pm, CBSSN		at Butler	L 53–67	7–13 (1–7)	13 – Cain/Hamilton IV	5 – Henry	3 – Garrett Jr	Hinkle Fieldhouse (7,611); Indianapolis, IN
Jan 30, 2016; 1:00 pm, CBSSN		No. 7 Xavier	L 65–86	7–14 (1–8)	18 – Garrett, Jr.	7 – Ryckbosch	2 – 3 tied	Allstate Arena (6,958); Rosemont, IL
Feb 2, 2016; 8:00 pm, FS1		No. 11 Providence	W 77–70	8–14 (2–8)	27 – Henry	11 – Henry	4 – Cain/Garrett, Jr.	Allstate Arena (5,114); Rosemont, IL
Feb 6, 2016; 1:00 pm, FSN		at Creighton	L 66–88	8–15 (2–9)	22 – Henry	8 – Henry	3 – Simpson	CenturyLink Center (17,139); Omaha, NE
Feb 9, 2016; 8:00 pm, FS1		No. 1 Villanova	L 59–86	8–16 (2–10)	15 – Cain	11 – Henry	3 – Wood	Allstate Arena (6,393); Rosemont, IL
Feb 17, 2016; 7:00 pm, CBSSN		at St. John's	L 65–80	8–17 (2–11)	25 – Cain	5 – Garrett, Jr.	4 – Garrett, Jr.	Carnesecca Arena (5,010); Queens, NY
Feb 20, 2016; 1:00 pm, FSN		Marquette	L 60–73	8–18 (2–12)	20 – Hamilton IV	9 – Stimage	5 – Johnson	Allstate Arena (8,524); Rosemont, IL
Feb 25, 2016; 8:00 pm, FS1		St. John's	W 83–75	9–18 (3–12)	19 – Garrett, Jr.	8 – Henry	10 – Garrett, Jr.	Allstate Arena (4,817); Rosemont, IL
Feb 27, 2016; 3:00 pm, CBSSN		at Providence	L 66–87	9–19 (3–13)	22 – Cain	6 – Hamilton IV	2 – Wood	Dunkin' Donuts Center (12,435); Providence, RI
Mar 1, 2016; 6:00 pm, FS1		at No. 3 Villanova	L 62–83	9–20 (3–14)	14 – Cain	9 – Henry	4 – Cain	The Pavilion (6,500); Villanova, PA
Mar 5, 2016; 11:00 am, FSN		Seton Hall	L 66–80	9–21 (3–15)	18 – Garrett, Jr.	7 – Stimage	4 – Simpson	Allstate Arena (5,954); Rosemont, IL
Big East tournament
Mar 9, 2016; 7:00 pm, FS1	(9)	vs. (8) Georgetown; First round	L 53–70	9–22	14 – Cain	5 – 4 tied	3 – Wood	Madison Square Garden (12,604); New York, NY
*Non-conference game. ^{#}Rankings from AP Poll. (#) Tournament seedings in parentheses. All times are in Central Time.
