= 2016 Big East men's basketball tournament =

- Classification: Division I
- Season: 2015–16
- Teams: 10
- Site: Madison Square Garden; New York City
- Champions: Seton Hall (3rd title)
- Winning coach: Kevin Willard (1st title)
- MVP: Isaiah Whitehead (Seton Hall)
- Attendance: 78,222
- Television: FS1, FOX

2015–16 Big East men's basketball standings
	Conf.				Overall
Team	W		L	PCT	W		L	PCT
No. 6 Villanova	16	–	2	.889	35	–	5	.875
No. 9 Xavier	14	–	4	.778	28	–	5	.848
No. 20 Seton Hall †	12	–	6	.667	25	–	9	.735
Providence	10	–	8	.556	24	–	11	.686
Butler	10	–	8	.556	22	–	11	.667
Creighton	9	–	9	.500	20	–	15	.571
Marquette	8	–	10	.444	20	–	13	.606
Georgetown	7	–	11	.389	15	–	18	.455
DePaul	3	–	15	.167	9	–	22	.290
St. John's	1	–	17	.056	8	–	24	.250
† 2016 Big East tournament winner Rankings from AP poll

The 2016 Big East men's basketball tournament, officially known as the 2016 Big East tournament, was a tournament held from March 9–12, at Madison Square Garden in New York City. The Big East Championship game returned to broadcast television for the first time in over twenty years and was televised on Fox. Seton Hall won their first Big East tournament since 1993 and received the conference's automatic bid to the NCAA tournament.

== Seeds ==
All 10 Big East schools participate in the tournament. Teams were seeded by the 2015–16 Big East Conference season record. The top 6 teams received a first round bye.

Seeding for the tournament was determined at the close of the regular conference season.

Seed	School	Conference	Tiebreaker
1	Villanova	16–2	
2	Xavier	14–4	
3	Seton Hall	12–6	
4	Providence	10–8	2–0 vs. Butler
5	Butler	10–8	0–2 vs. Providence
6	Creighton	9–9	
7	Marquette	8–10	
8	Georgetown	7–11	
9	DePaul	3–15	
10	St. John's	1–17	

== Schedule ==
Game	Time*	Matchup^{#}	Television	Attendance
First round – Wednesday, March 9
1	7:00 pm	#9 DePaul 53 vs. #8 Georgetown 70	FS1	12,604
2	9:30 pm	#10 St. John's 93 vs. #7 Marquette 101	FS1	12,604
Quarterfinals – Thursday, March 10
3	12:00 pm	#8 Georgetown 67 vs. #1 Villanova 81	FS1	14,863
4	2:30 pm	#5 Butler 60 vs. #4 Providence 74	FS1	14,863
5	7:00 pm	#7 Marquette 72 vs. #2 Xavier 90	FS1	13,813
6	9:30 pm	#6 Creighton 73 vs. #3 Seton Hall 81	FS1	13,813
Semifinals – Friday, March 11
7	6:30 pm	#4 Providence 68 vs. #1 Villanova 76	FS1	17,130
8	9:30 pm	#3 Seton Hall 87 vs. #2 Xavier 83	FS1	17,130
Championship – Saturday, March 12
9	5:30 pm	#3 Seton Hall 69 vs. #1 Villanova 67	FOX	19,812
*Game times in Eastern Time. Tournament seed in parentheses. #-Rankings denote Associated Press Poll ranking.

== Bracket ==
First round March 9
8	Georgetown	70
9	DePaul	53
7	Marquette	101
10	St. John's	93

Quarterfinals; March 10
1	#3 Villanova	81
8	Georgetown	67
4	Providence	74
5	Butler	60
2	#5 Xavier	90
7	Marquette	72
3	Seton Hall	81
6	Creighton	73

Semifinals; March 11
1	#3 Villanova	76
4	Providence	68
2	#5 Xavier	83
3	Seton Hall	87

Championship; March 12
1	#3 Villanova	67
3	Seton Hall	69

=== Quarterfinals ===
FS1

Thursday, March 10
12:00 pm EST

Box Score

#8 Georgetown Hoyas 67, #1 Villanova Wildcats 81
Scoring by half: 27–28, 40–53
Pts: J. Hart – 25; Rebs: D. Reynolds – 9 Asts: R. Arcidiacono – 6

Madison Square Garden, New York City, New York
Attendance: 14,863
Referees: Mike Roberts, Tony Chiazza, Tim Clougherty

=== Semifinals ===
FS1

Friday, March 11
6:30 pm EST

Box Score

#4 Providence Friars 68, #1 Villanova Wildcats 76
Scoring by half: 27–32, 41–44
Pts: K. Jenkins – 21; Rebs: D. Reynolds – 8 Asts: R. Arcidiacono, K. Jenkins – 4

Madison Square Garden, New York City, New York
Attendance: 17,130
Referees: Jeff Anderson, Ed Corbett, Pat Driscoll

=== Championship ===
Fox

Saturday, March 12
5:30 pm EST

Box Score

#3 Seton Hall Pirates 69, #1 Villanova Wildcats 67
Scoring by half: 40–29, 29–38
Pts: K. Jenkins – 23; Rebs: D. Ochefu – 7 Asts: R. Arcidiacono – 3

Madison Square Garden, New York City, New York
Attendance: 19,812
Referees: Mike Roberts, Brian O'Connell, John Gaffney

== All-Tournament team ==
- Khadeen Carrington, Seton Hall
- Ismael Sanogo, Seton Hall
- Kris Jenkins, Villanova
- Josh Hart, Villanova
- Trevon Bluiett, Xavier

Dave Gavitt Trophy (Most Outstanding Player)

- Isaiah Whitehead, Seton Hall

== See also ==
- 2016 Big East women's basketball tournament
