= 2015–16 Xavier Musketeers men's basketball team =

American college basketball season

2015–16 Xavier Musketeers men's basketball

AdvoCare Invitational champions

NCAA tournament, Second Round
- Conference: Big East Conference

Ranking
- Coaches: No. 11
- AP: No. 9
- Record: 28–6 (14–4 Big East)
- Head coach: Chris Mack (7th season)
- Assistant coaches: Travis Steele; Luke Murray; Mike Pegues
- Home arena: Cintas Center

2015–16 Big East men's basketball standings
	Conf.				Overall
Team	W		L	PCT	W		L	PCT
No. 6 Villanova	16	–	2	.889	35	–	5	.875
No. 9 Xavier	14	–	4	.778	28	–	5	.848
No. 20 Seton Hall †	12	–	6	.667	25	–	9	.735
Providence	10	–	8	.556	24	–	11	.686
Butler	10	–	8	.556	22	–	11	.667
Creighton	9	–	9	.500	20	–	15	.571
Marquette	8	–	10	.444	20	–	13	.606
Georgetown	7	–	11	.389	15	–	18	.455
DePaul	3	–	15	.167	9	–	22	.290
St. John's	1	–	17	.056	8	–	24	.250
† 2016 Big East tournament winner Rankings from AP poll

The 2015–16 Xavier Musketeers men's basketball team represented Xavier University during the 2015–16 NCAA Division I men's basketball season. Led by seventh year head coach Chris Mack, they played their games at the Cintas Center and were third year members of the Big East Conference. They finished the season 28–6, 14–4 in Big East play to finish in second place. They defeated Marquette in the quarterfinals of the Big East tournament to advance to the semifinals where they lost to Seton Hall. They received an at-large bid to the NCAA tournament where they received a #2 seed. They defeated Weber State in the First Round to advance to the Second Round where they lost to Wisconsin.

== Previous season ==
The Musketeers finished the 2014–15 season 23–14, 9–9 in Big East play to finish in sixth place. They advanced to the finals of the Big East tournament where they lost to Villanova. They received an at-large bid to the NCAA tournament where they defeated Ole Miss and Georgia State before losing to Arizona in the Sweet Sixteen.

== Departures ==
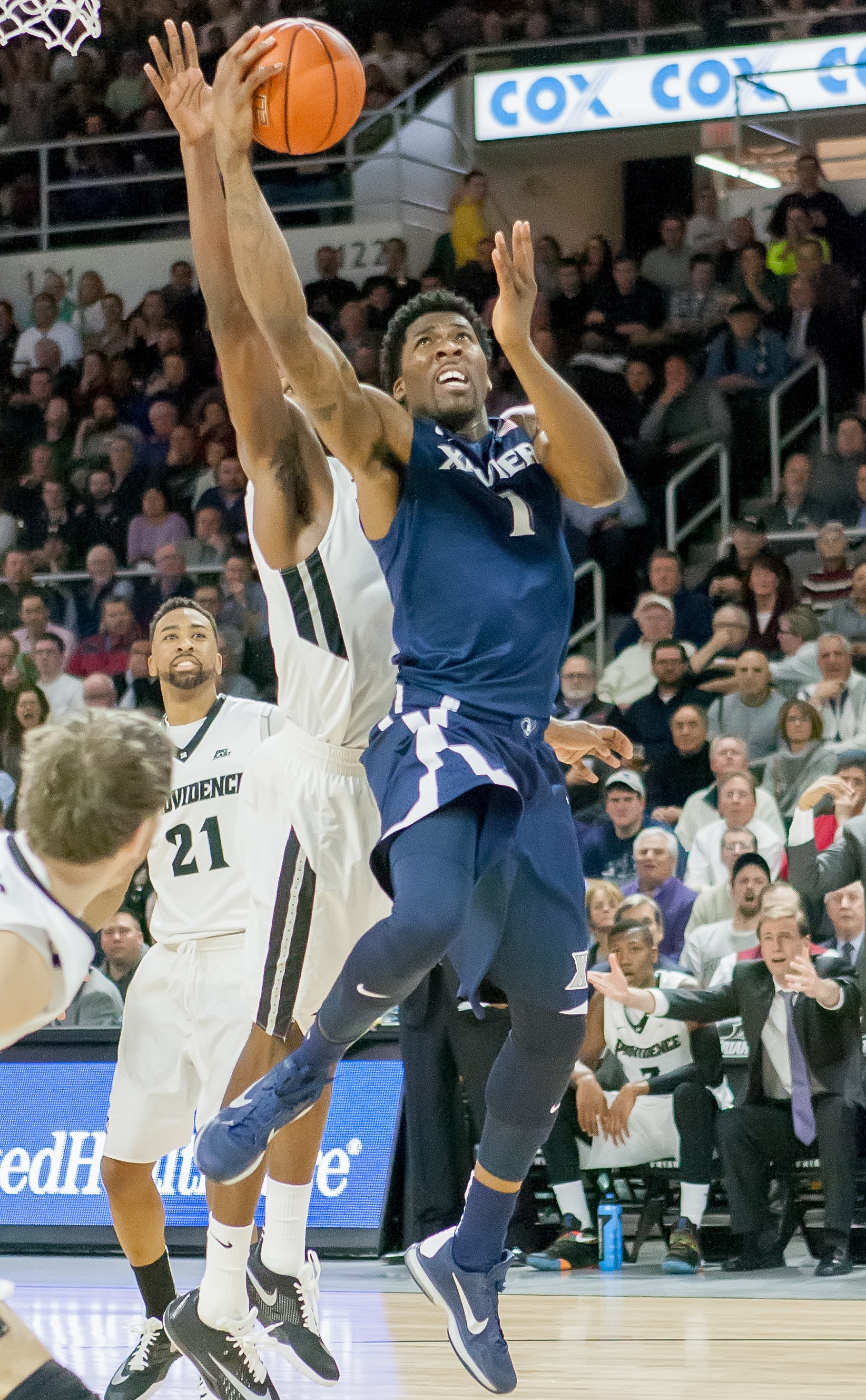
Jalen Reynolds

Name	Number	Pos.	Height	Weight	Year	Hometown	Notes
Brandon Randolph	3	G	6'2"	189	Sophomore	Inglewood, CA	Transferred to Utah Valley
Dee Davis	10	G	6'0"	170	Senior	Bloomington, IN	Graduated
Matt Stainbrook	40	C	6'10"	270	RS Senior	Bay Village, OH	Graduated

== Incoming recruits ==
College recruiting
Name	Hometown	School	Height	Weight	Commit date
Kaiser Gates; SF	Alpharetta, GA	St. Francis	6 ft 7 in (2.01 m)	190 lb (86 kg)	Oct 16, 2014
Kaiser Gates; SF	Recruit ratings: Scout: Rivals: 247Sports: ESPN:				
Overall recruit ranking:
Note: In many cases, Scout, Rivals, 247Sports, On3, and ESPN may conflict in their listings of height and weight.; In these cases, the average was taken. ESPN grades are on a 100-point scale.; Sources: "2015 Team Ranking". Rivals.

== Roster ==
2015–16 Xavier Musketeers men's basketball team
Players
Coaches

Pos.	#	Name	Height	Weight	Year	Hometown
G	0	Larry Jr. Austin	6 ft 2 in (1.88 m)	174 lb (79 kg)	So	Springfield, Illinois
F	1	Jalen Reynolds	6 ft 10 in (2.08 m)	232 lb (105 kg)	Jr	Livonia, Michigan
F	2	James Farr	6 ft 10 in (2.08 m)	247 lb (112 kg)	Sr	Evanston, Illinois
G	4	Edmond Sumner	6 ft 5 in (1.96 m)	183 lb (83 kg)	RS Fr	Detroit, Michigan
F	5	Trevon Bluiett	6 ft 6 in (1.98 m)	207 lb (94 kg)	So	Indianapolis, Indiana
G	10	Remy Abell	6 ft 4 in (1.93 m)	195 lb (88 kg)	RS Sr	Louisville, Kentucky
F	13	Makinde London	6 ft 10 in (2.08 m)	210 lb (95 kg)	RS Fr	Nashville, Tennessee
G	15	Myles Davis	6 ft 2 in (1.88 m)	188 lb (85 kg)	Jr	Plainfield, New Jersey
F	21	Tim Stainbrook	6 ft 6 in (1.98 m)	200 lb (91 kg)	Jr	Bay Village, Ohio
F	22	Kaiser Gates	6 ft 8 in (2.03 m)	205 lb (93 kg)	Fr	Alpharetta, Georgia
F	32	Kevin Coker	6 ft 6 in (1.98 m)	200 lb (91 kg)	Sr	Plainfield, Illinois
F	35	RaShid Gaston (redshirt)	6 ft 9 in (2.06 m)	240 lb (109 kg)	RS Jr	Warren, Ohio
F/C	54	Sean O'Mara	6 ft 10 in (2.08 m)	247 lb (112 kg)	So	Lisle, Illinois
G	55	J. P. Macura	6 ft 5 in (1.96 m)	195 lb (88 kg)	So	Lakeville, Minnesota

Head coach

- Chris Mack (Xavier)

Assistant coach(es)

- Travis Steele (Butler)
- Luke Murray (Fairfield)
- Mike Pegues (Delaware)

Legend

- (C) Team captain
- (S) Suspended
- (I) Ineligible
- (W) Walk-on
- Injured
- Current redshirt

Roster
Last update: 07-28-2015

== Schedule ==
Date time, TV	Rank^{#}	Opponent^{#}	Result	Record	High points	High rebounds	High assists	Site (attendance) city, state
Exhibition
Nov 7, 2015*; 2:00 pm		Northwood	W 97–77	0–0	17 – Sumner	9 – Bluiett	7 – Davis	Cintas Center (9,312); Cincinnati, OH
Non-conference regular season
Nov 13, 2015*; 7:00 pm, FCS		Miami (OH)	W 81–72	1–0	19 – Sumner	15 – Reynolds	3 – Tied	Cintas Center (10,372); Cincinnati, OH
Nov 17, 2015*; 6:30 pm, FS1		Missouri	W 78–66	2–0	18 – Bluiett	14 – Farr	4 – Davis	Cintas Center (9,751); Cincinnati, OH
Nov 20, 2015*; 9:00 pm, BTN		at No. 24 Michigan; Gavitt Tipoff Games	W 86–70	3–0	15 – Tied	13 – Farr	3 – Tied	Crisler Center (11,967); Ann Arbor, MI
Nov 23, 2015*; 8:30 pm, FS1	No. 23	Northern Kentucky	W 78–66	4–0	14 – Bluiett	16 – Blueitt	5 – Blueitt	Cintas Center (9,688); Cincinnati, OH
Nov 26, 2015*; 12:00 pm, ESPN2	No. 23	vs. Alabama; AdvoCare Invitational First Round	W 64–45	5–0	15 – Bluiett	9 – Reynolds	6 – Sumner	HP Field House (4,629); Bay Lake, FL
Nov 27, 2015*; 2:30 pm, ESPNU	No. 23	vs. USC; AdvoCare Invitational Semifinals	W 87–77	6–0	16 – Bluiett	9 – Farr	3 – Austin Jr.	HP Field House (4,170); Bay Lake, FL
Nov 29, 2015*; 4:30 pm, ESPN2	No. 23	vs. Dayton; AdvoCare Invitational Championship	W 90–61	7–0	14 – Sumner	7 – Farr	3 – Tied	HP Field House (4,633); Bay Lake, FL
Dec 5, 2015*; 8:30 pm, FS1	No. 12	WKU	W 95–64	8–0	21 – Bluiett	10 – Bluiett	6 – Davis	Cintas Center (10,250); Cincinnati, OH
Dec 8, 2015*; 7:00 pm, FS1	No. 12	Wright State	W 90–55	9–0	22 – Bluiett	11 – Bluiett	4 – Abell	Cintas Center (10,178); Cincinnati, OH
Dec 12, 2015*; 5:30 pm, FOX	No. 12	No. 23 Cincinnati; Skyline Chili Crosstown Shootout	W 65–55	10–0	17 – Davis	6 – Tied	5 – Sumner	Cintas Center (10,617); Cincinnati, OH
Dec 19, 2015*; 12:00 pm, FS1	No. 10	Auburn	W 85–61	11–0	18 – Reynolds	11 – Farr	5 – Tied	Cintas Center (10,018); Cincinnati, OH
Dec 22, 2015*; 7:30 pm	No. 6	at Wake Forest; Skip Prosser Classic	W 78–70	12–0	21 – Sumner	9 – Tied	3 – Davis	LJVM Coliseum (12,938); Winston-Salem, NC
Big East regular season
Dec 31, 2015; 12:00 pm, FS1	No. 6	at No. 16 Villanova	L 64-95	12–1 (0–1)	15 – Farr	7 – Farr	5 – Davis	The Pavilion (6,500); Villanova, PA
Jan 2, 2016; 1:00 pm, FS1	No. 6	No. 9 Butler; Big East New Year's Marathon	W 88–69	13–1 (1–1)	21 – Abell	10 – Farr	5 – Davis	Cintas Center (10,498); Cincinnati, OH
Jan 6, 2016; 9:00 pm, FS1	No. 10	at St. John's	W 74–66	14–1 (2–1)	19 – Davis	13 – Reynolds	4 – Davis	Carnesecca Arena (4,168); Queens, NY
Jan 12, 2016; 6:30 pm, FS1	No. 7	DePaul	W 84–64	15–1 (3–1)	24 – Bluiett	7 – Reynolds	7 – Davis	Cintas Center (10,400); Cincinnati, OH
Jan 16, 2016; 2:00 pm, FS1	No. 7	at Marquette	W 74–66	16–1 (4–1)	18 – Bluiett	19 – Farr	5 – Sumner	BMO Harris Bradley Center (14,864); Milwaukee, WI
Jan 19, 2016; 8:45 pm, FS1	No. 5	Georgetown	L 72–81	16–2 (4–2)	18 – Bluiett	10 – Bluiett	5 – Bluiett	Cintas Center (9,906); Cincinnati, OH
Jan 23, 2016; 2:00 pm, FSN	No. 5	Seton Hall	W 84–76	17–2 (5–2)	24 – Farr	15 – Farr	5 – Davis	Cintas Center (10,368); Cincinnati, OH
Jan 26, 2016; 8:30 pm, FS1	No. 7	at No. 10 Providence	W 75–68	18–2 (6–2)	15 – Tied	11 – Reynolds	7 – Davis	Dunkin' Donuts Center (12,804); Providence, RI
Jan 30, 2016; 2:00 pm, CBSSN	No. 7	at DePaul	W 86–65	19–2 (7–2)	15 – Bluiett	6 – Tied	4 – Austin Jr.	Allstate Arena (6,958); Rosemont, IL
Feb 3, 2016; 6:30 pm, FS1	No. 6	St. John's	W 90–83	20–2 (8–2)	16 – Davis	13 – Bluiett	5 – Davis	Cintas Center (10,250); Cincinnati, OH
Feb 6, 2016; 12:00 pm, FS1	No. 6	Marquette	W 90–82	21–2 (9–2)	23 – Bluiett	9 – Reynolds	8 – Bluiett	Cintas Center (10,509); Cincinnati, OH
Feb 9, 2016; 8:30 pm, CBSSN	No. 5	at Creighton	L 56–70	21–3 (9–3)	17 – Reynolds	9 – Reynolds	2 – Tied	CenturyLink Center (17,011); Omaha, NE
Feb 13, 2016; 2:30 pm, FOX	No. 5	at Butler	W 74–57	22–3 (10–3)	13 – Macura	12 – Farr	3 – Tied	Hinkle Fieldhouse (9,344); Indianapolis, IN
Feb 17, 2016; 7:00 pm, FS1	No. 8	No. 23 Providence	W 85–74	23–3 (11–3)	23 – Bluiett	15 – Reynolds	12 – Davis	Cintas Center (10,336); Cincinnati, OH
Feb 20, 2016; 12:07 pm, FOX	No. 8	at Georgetown	W 88–70	24–3 (12–3)	22 – Sumner	5 – Tied	4 – Macura	Verizon Center (10,652); Washington, D.C.
Feb 24, 2016; 7:00 pm, FS1	No. 5	No. 1 Villanova	W 90–83	25–3 (13–3)	19 – Tied	7 – Tied	9 – Sumner	Cintas Center (10,727); Cincinnati, OH
Feb 28, 2016; 12:30 pm, FS1	No. 5	at Seton Hall	L 81–90	25–4 (13–4)	17 – Tied	8 – Farr	5 – Davis	Prudential Center (10,353); Newark, NJ
Mar 5, 2016; 2:30 pm, FOX	No. 5	Creighton	W 98–93	26–4 (14–4)	24 – Davis	8 – Gates	7 – Davis	Cintas Center (10,633); Cincinnati, OH
Big East tournament
Mar 10, 2016; 7:00 pm, FS1	(2) No. 5	vs. (7) Marquette; Quarterfinals	W 90–72	27–4	24 – Bluiett	6 – Bluiett	7 – Sumner	Madison Square Garden (13,813); New York, NY
Mar 11, 2016; 9:00 pm, FS1	(2) No. 5	vs. (3) Seton Hall; Semifinals	L 83–87	27–5	21 – Sumner	10 – Farr	4 – Sumner/Davis	Madison Square Garden (17,130); New York, NY
NCAA tournament
Mar 18, 2016*; 9:20 pm, TNT	(2 E) No. 9	vs. (15 E) Weber State; First Round	W 71–53	28–5	18 – Farr	15 – Farr	6 – Davis/Sumner	Scottrade Center (14,425); St. Louis, MO
Mar 20, 2016*; 8:40 pm, TNT	(2 E) No. 9	vs. (7 E) Wisconsin; Second Round	L 63–66	28–6	13 – Abell/Reynolds	9 – Reynolds	5 – Sumner	Scottrade Center (15,169); St. Louis, MO
*Non-conference game. ^{#}Rankings from AP Poll. (#) Tournament seedings in parentheses. E=East Region. All times are in Eastern Time.

== Rankings ==
Ranking movement Legend: ██ Increase in ranking. ██ Decrease in ranking. (RV) Received votes but unranked. (NR) Not ranked.
Poll	Pre	Wk 2	Wk 3	Wk 4	Wk 5	Wk 6	Wk 7	Wk 8	Wk 9	Wk 10	Wk 11	Wk 12	Wk 13	Wk 14	Wk 15	Wk 16	Wk 17	Wk 18	Wk 19	Final
AP	RV	RV	23	12	12	10	6	6	10	7	5	7	6	5	8	5	5	5	9	*N/A
Coaches	RV	RV	RV	18	13	10	6	6	12	8	5	4	5	4	7	5	5	5	9	11

*AP does not release post-NCAA tournament rankings
