= 2015–16 Marquette Golden Eagles men's basketball team =

American college basketball season

2015–16 Marquette Golden Eagles men's basketball
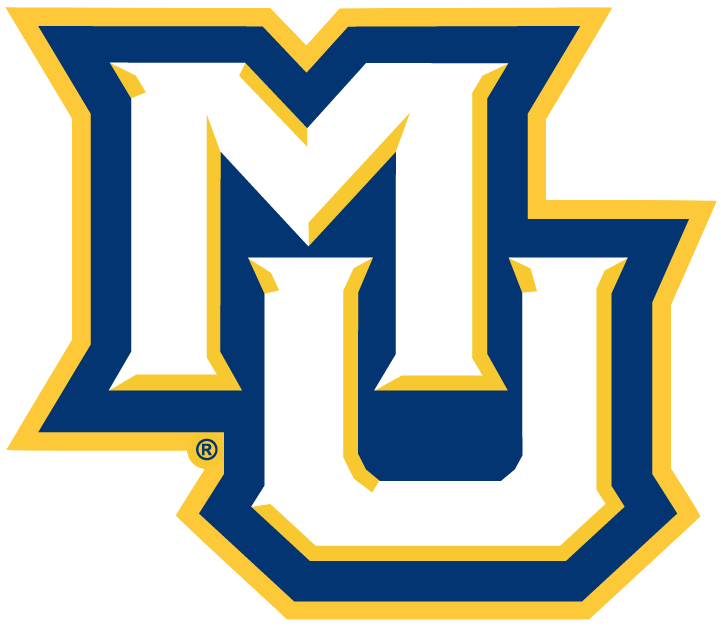

Legends Classic champions
- Conference: Big East Conference|Big East
- Record: 20–13 (8–10 Big East)
- Head coach: Steve Wojciechowski (2nd season)
- Assistant coaches: Chris Carrawell; Stan Johnson; Brett Nelson
- Home arena: BMO Harris Bradley Center

2015–16 Big East men's basketball standings
| | Conf. | | | | Overall |
| Team | W | | L | PCT | W | | L | PCT |
|---|---|---|---|---|---|---|---|---|
| No. 6 Villanova | 16 | – | 2 | .889 | 35 | – | 5 | .875 |
| No. 9 Xavier | 14 | – | 4 | .778 | 28 | – | 5 | .848 |
| No. 20 Seton Hall † | 12 | – | 6 | .667 | 25 | – | 9 | .735 |
| Providence | 10 | – | 8 | .556 | 24 | – | 11 | .686 |
| Butler | 10 | – | 8 | .556 | 22 | – | 11 | .667 |
| Creighton | 9 | – | 9 | .500 | 20 | – | 15 | .571 |
| Marquette | 8 | – | 10 | .444 | 20 | – | 13 | .606 |
| Georgetown | 7 | – | 11 | .389 | 15 | – | 18 | .455 |
| DePaul | 3 | – | 15 | .167 | 9 | – | 22 | .290 |
| St. John's | 1 | – | 17 | .056 | 8 | – | 24 | .250 |
† 2016 Big East tournament winner Rankings from AP poll

The 2015–16 Marquette Golden Eagles men's basketball team represented Marquette University in the 2015–16 NCAA Division I men's basketball season. The Golden Eagles, led by second-year head coach Steve Wojciechowski, played their home games at the BMO Harris Bradley Center, and were members of the Big East Conference. They finished the season 20–13, 8–10 in Big East play to finish in seventh place. They defeated St. John's in the first round of the Big East tournament to advance to the quarterfinals where they lost to Xavier. Despite having 20 wins, they did not participate in a postseason tournament.

== Previous season ==
The Golden Eagles finished the 2014–15 season 13–19, 4–14 in Big East play to finish ninth in the Big East. Marquette defeated Seton Hall before losing to Villanova in the quarterfinals of the Big East tournament. The Golden Eagles finished with a losing conference record for the first time in 15 years, dating back to the 1998–99 season.

== Off season ==
=== Departures ===
| Name | Number | Pos. | Height | Weight | Year | Hometown | Notes |
|---|---|---|---|---|---|---|---|
| Juan Anderson | 10 | F | 6'6" | 215 | Senior | Oakland, CA | Graduated |
| Matt Carlino | 13 | G | 6'2" | 175 | RS Senior | Arcadia, AZ | Graduated |
| John Dawson | 2 | G | 6'2" | 205 | Sophomore | Clovis, NM | Transferred to Liberty |
| Matthew Mache | 54 | F | 6'5" | 215 | Sophomore | Glen Ellyn, IL | Walk-on didn't return |
| Steve Taylor Jr | 25 | F | 6'7" | 240 | Junior | Chicago, IL | Transferred to Toledo |
| Derrick Wilson | 12 | G | 6'1" | 210 | Senior | Anchorage, AK | Graduated |

=== Incoming transfers ===
| Name | Number | Pos. | Height | Weight | Year | Hometown | Notes |
|---|---|---|---|---|---|---|---|
| Andrew Rowsey | 30 | G | 5'10" | 180 | Junior | Lexington, VA | Transferred from UNC Asheville. Under NCAA transfer rules, Rowsey will have to redshirt for the 2015–16 season. Will have two years of remaining eligibility. |

== Incoming recruits ==
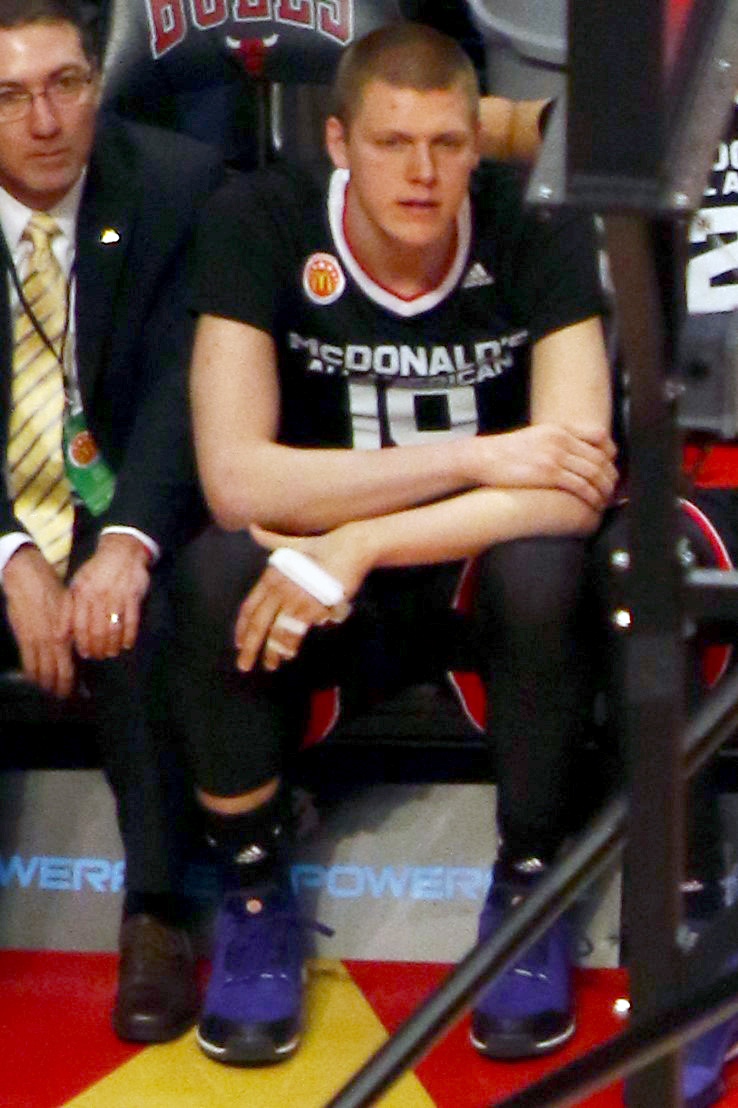
Henry Ellenson at the 2015 McDonald's All-American Boys Game

College recruiting information
| Name | Hometown | School | Height | Weight | Commit date |
|---|---|---|---|---|---|
| Henry Ellenson; PF | Rice Lake, WI | Rice Lake High School | 6 ft 10 in (2.08 m) | 230 lb (100 kg) | Oct 9, 2014 |
| Henry Ellenson; PF | Recruit ratings: Scout: Rivals: (96) | | | | |
| Haanif Cheatham; SG | Fort Lauderdale, FL | Pembroke Pines Charter High School | 6 ft 5 in (1.96 m) | 175 lb (79 kg) | Sep 5, 2014 |
| Haanif Cheatham; SG | Recruit ratings: Scout: Rivals: (83) | | | | |
| Matt Heldt; C | Neenah, WI | Neenah High School | 6 ft 10 in (2.08 m) | 210 lb (95 kg) | Jul 1, 2014 |
| Matt Heldt; C | Recruit ratings: Scout: Rivals: (80) | | | | |
| Sacar Anim; SG | Minneapolis, MN | De La Salle Collegiate High School | 6 ft 5 in (1.96 m) | 190 lb (86 kg) | Feb 23, 2015 |
| Sacar Anim; SG | Recruit ratings: Scout: Rivals: (80) | | | | |
| Traci Carter; PG | Philadelphia, Pennsylvania | Life Center Academy | 6 ft 0 in (1.83 m) | 160 lb (73 kg) | Mar 10, 2015 |
| Traci Carter; PG | Recruit ratings: Scout: Rivals: (80) | | | | |
Overall recruit ranking:
Note: In many cases, Scout, Rivals, 247Sports, On3, and ESPN may conflict in their listings of height and weight.; In these cases, the average was taken. ESPN grades are on a 100-point scale.; Sources: "2015 Team Ranking". Rivals.

== Roster ==
2015–16 Marquette Golden Eagles men's basketball team
Players
Coaches

| Pos. | # | Name | Height | Weight | Year | Hometown |
|---|---|---|---|---|---|---|
| G | 1 | Duane Wilson | 6 ft 2 in (1.88 m) | 185 lb (84 kg) | RS So | Milwaukee, Wisconsin |
| G | 2 | Sacar Anim | 6 ft 5 in (1.96 m) | 205 lb (93 kg) | Fr | Minneapolis, Minnesota |
| F | 5 | Sandy Cohen III | 6 ft 6 in (1.98 m) | 180 lb (82 kg) | So | Seymour, Wisconsin |
| C | 12 | Matt Heldt | 6 ft 10 in (2.08 m) | 225 lb (102 kg) | Fr | Neenah, Wisconsin |
| F | 13 | Henry Ellenson | 6 ft 10 in (2.08 m) | 245 lb (111 kg) | Fr | Rice Lake, Wisconsin |
| G | 21 | Traci Carter | 6 ft 0 in (1.83 m) | 175 lb (79 kg) | Fr | Philadelphia, Pennsylvania |
| G | 22 | Wally Ellenson | 6 ft 6 in (1.98 m) | 210 lb (95 kg) | RS Jr | Rice Lake, Wisconsin |
| G | 23 | JaJuan Johnson | 6 ft 5 in (1.96 m) | 200 lb (91 kg) | Jr | Memphis, Tennessee |
| F | 25 | Haanif Cheatham | 6 ft 5 in (1.96 m) | 180 lb (82 kg) | Fr | Fort Lauderdale, Florida |
| G | 30 | Andrew Rowsey (redshirt) | 5 ft 10 in (1.78 m) | 180 lb (82 kg) | Jr | Lexington, Virginia |
| C | 40 | Luke Fischer | 6 ft 11 in (2.11 m) | 245 lb (111 kg) | RS Jr | Germantown, Wisconsin |
| G | 41 | Christian Haffner (W) | 6 ft 1 in (1.85 m) | 155 lb (70 kg) | Fr | Gresham, Wisconsin |
| F | 42 | Michael Mache (W) | 6 ft 5 in (1.96 m) | 220 lb (100 kg) | Sr | Glen Ellyn, Illinois |
| G | 52 | Cam Marotta (W) | 6 ft 0 in (1.83 m) | 160 lb (73 kg) | Fr | Mequon, Wisconsin |

Head coach

- Steve Wojciechowski (Duke)

Assistant coach(es)

- Chris Carrawell (Duke)
- Brett Nelson (Florida)
- Stan Johnson (Southern Utah)

Legend

- (C) Team captain
- (S) Suspended
- (I) Ineligible
- (W) Walk-on
- Injured
- Current redshirt

Roster
Last update: 2015-07-25

== Schedule ==
| Date time, TV | Rank^{#} | Opponent^{#} | Result | Record | Site (attendance) city, state |
Exhibition
| Nov 9, 2015*; 7:00 pm | | Valley City State | W 97–58 | | BMO Harris Bradley Center (11,156); Milwaukee, WI |
Regular season
| Nov 13, 2015*; 8:00 pm, FSN | | Belmont; Legends Classic | L 80–83 | 0–1 | BMO Harris Bradley Center (12,628); Milwaukee, WI |
| Nov 16, 2015*; 8:00 pm, FS1 | | IUPUI; Legends Classic | W 75–71 ^{OT} | 1–1 | BMO Harris Bradley Center (11,597); Milwaukee, WI |
| Nov 19, 2015*; 8:00 pm, FS1 | | Iowa; Gavitt Tipoff Games | L 61–89 | 1–2 | BMO Harris Bradley Center (13,297); Milwaukee, WI |
| Nov 23, 2015*; 6:00 pm, ESPN2 | | vs. No. 22 LSU; Legends Classic Semifinal | W 81–80 | 2–2 | Barclays Center (5,775); Brooklyn, NY |
| Nov 24, 2015*; 7:00 pm, ESPN2 | | vs. Arizona State; Legends Classic Championship | W 78–73 ^{OT} | 3–2 | Barclays Center (4,777); Brooklyn, NY |
| Nov 29, 2015*; 12:30 pm, FS1 | | Jackson State | W 80–61 | 4–2 | BMO Harris Bradley Center (11,764); Milwaukee, WI |
| Dec 2, 2015*; 7:00 pm, FS2 | | Grambling State | W 95–49 | 5–2 | BMO Harris Bradley Center (11,618); Milwaukee, WI |
| Dec 5, 2015*; 1:30 pm, FSN | | Maine | W 104–67 | 6–2 | BMO Harris Bradley Center (12,304); Milwaukee, WI |
| Dec 8, 2015*; 7:00 pm, FS2 | | San Jose State | W 80–62 | 7–2 | BMO Harris Bradley Center (11,696); Milwaukee, WI |
| Dec 12, 2015*; 12:30 pm, ESPN2 | | at Wisconsin; Rivalry | W 57–55 | 8–2 | Kohl Center (17,287); Madison, WI |
| Dec 22, 2015*; 6:00 pm, FS1 | | Chicago State | W 91–74 | 9–2 | BMO Harris Bradley Center (11,937); Milwaukee, WI |
| Dec 27, 2015*; 1:30 pm, FS1 | | Presbyterian | W 84–66 | 10–2 | BMO Harris Bradley Center (12,226); Milwaukee, WI |
| Dec 30, 2015; 6:00 pm, FS1 | | Seton Hall | L 63–83 | 10–3 (0–1) | BMO Harris Bradley Center (13,314); Milwaukee, WI |
| Jan 2, 2016; 4:30 pm, FS1 | | at Georgetown; Big East New Year's Marathon | L 70–80 | 10–4 (0–2) | Verizon Center (10,253); Washington, D.C. |
| Jan 5, 2016; 6:00 pm, FS1 | | at No. 8 Providence | W 65–64 | 11–4 (1–2) | Dunkin' Donuts Center (10,446); Providence, RI |
| Jan 9, 2016; 1:00 pm, FSN | | St. John's | W 81–75 | 12–4 (2–2) | BMO Harris Bradley Center (13,468); Milwaukee, WI |
| Jan 13, 2016; 7:30 pm, FS1 | | at No. 6 Villanova | L 68–83 | 15–5 (2–3) | The Pavilion (6,500); Villanova, PA |
| Jan 16, 2016; 1:30 pm, FS1 | | No. 7 Xavier | L 66–74 | 12–6 (2–4) | BMO Harris Bradley Center (14,864); Milwaukee, WI |
| Jan 20, 2016; 7:00 pm, FS1 | | DePaul | L 56–57 | 12–7 (2–5) | BMO Harris Bradley Center (12,695); Milwaukee, WI |
| Jan 23, 2016; 7:00 pm, CBSSN | | at St. John's | W 78–73 | 13–7 (3–5) | Carnesecca Arena (1,032); Queens, NY |
| Jan 27, 2016*; 8:00 pm, FS1 | | Stetson | W 74–60 | 14–7 | BMO Harris Bradley Center (11,756); Milwaukee, WI |
| Jan 30, 2016; 11 am, FS1 | | Butler | W 75–69 | 15–7 (4–5) | BMO Harris Bradley Center (15,234); Milwaukee, WI |
| Feb 3, 2016; 7:30 pm, FS1 | | at Seton Hall | L 62–79 | 15–8 (4–6) | Prudential Center (6,008); Newark, NJ |
| Feb 6, 2016; 11 am, FS1 | | at No. 6 Xavier | L 82–90 | 15–9 (4–7) | Cintas Center (10,509); Cincinnati, OH |
| Feb 10, 2016; 6:00 pm, FS1 | | No. 20 Providence | W 96–91 ^{2OT} | 16–9 (5–7) | BMO Harris Bradley Center (14,616); Milwaukee, WI |
| Feb 13, 2016; 7:00 pm, FSN | | Creighton | L 62–65 | 16–10 (5–8) | BMO Harris Bradley Center (15,844); Milwaukee, WI |
| Feb 20, 2016; 1:00 pm, FSN | | at DePaul | W 73–60 | 17–10 (6–8) | Allstate Arena (8,524); Rosemont, IL |
| Feb 24, 2016; 7:00 pm, CBSSN | | at Creighton | W 66–61 | 18–10 (7–8) | CenturyLink Center (17,412); Omaha, NE |
| Feb 27, 2016; 12:30 pm, FOX | | No. 1 Villanova | L 79–89 | 18–11 (7–9) | BMO Harris Bradley Center (19,043); Milwaukee, WI |
| Mar 1, 2016; 8:12 pm, FS1 | | Georgetown | W 88–87 | 19–11 (8–9) | BMO Harris Bradley Center (12,957); Milwaukee, WI |
| Mar 5, 2016; 1:30 pm, FSN | | at Butler | L 74–95 | 19–12 (8–10) | Hinkle Fieldhouse (9,244); Indianapolis, IN |
Big East tournament
| Mar 9, 2016; 9:30 pm, FS1 | (7) | vs. (10) St. John's; First round | W 101–93 | 20–12 | Madison Square Garden (12,604); New York City, NY |
| Mar 10, 2016; 7:00 pm, FS1 | (7) | vs. (2) No. 5 Xavier; Quarterfinals | L 72–90 | 20–13 | Madison Square Garden (13,813); New York City, NY |
*Non-conference game. ^{#}Rankings from AP Poll. (#) Tournament seedings in parentheses. All times are in Eastern Time.
