= Kevin Willard =

American basketball coach (born 1975)

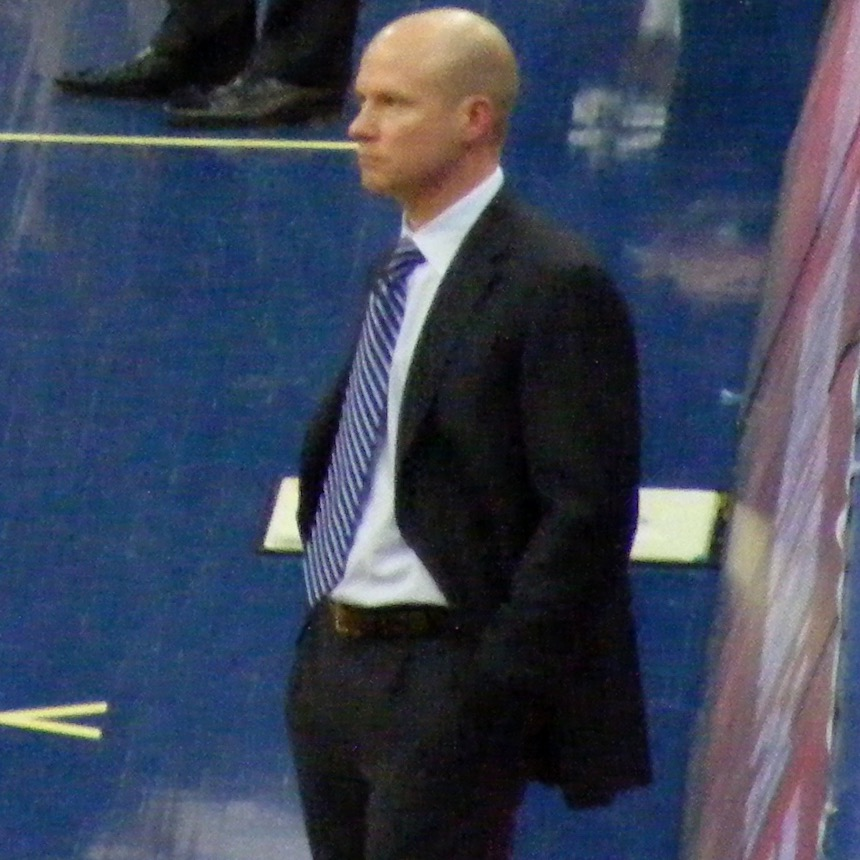
- Willard in 2012

Current position
- Title: Head coach
- Team: Villanova
- Conference: Big East
- Record: 28–11 (.718)
- Annual salary: $4,000,000

Biographical details
- Born: April 6, 1975 (age 51); Huntington, New York, U.S.

Playing career
- 1993–1994: Western Kentucky
- 1994–1997: Pittsburgh
- Position: Point guard

Coaching career (HC unless noted)
- 1997–2001: Boston Celtics (assistant)
- 2001–2007: Louisville (assistant)
- 2007–2010: Iona
- 2010–2022: Seton Hall
- 2022–2025: Maryland
- 2025–present: Villanova

Head coaching record
- Overall: 363–260 (.583)
- Tournaments: 4–8 (NCAA Division I); 1–1 (NIT)

Accomplishments and honors

Championships
- Big East tournament (2016); Big East regular season (2020)

Awards
- Big East Co-Coach of the Year (2016); MAAC Coach of the Year (2010)

Kevin Schreiber Willard (born April 6, 1975) is an American college basketball coach who is currently the head men's basketball coach for the Villanova Wildcats. He played basketball at Western Kentucky during the 1992–93 season before transferring to Pittsburgh to finish his playing career.

Willard's father, Ralph Willard, was the associate head coach at Louisville and a former head men's basketball coach at Western Kentucky, Pittsburgh, and Holy Cross.

== Coaching career ==
Kevin Willard started his coaching career in the NBA ranks, working on the bench with coach Rick Pitino of the Boston Celtics. After Pitino resigned from the Celtics in 2001, Willard followed him to Louisville, and spent the next six years there as his assistant.

=== Iona ===
He is the former head coach of Iona College, where he took over the reins after Jeff Ruland was fired after going 2–28 in 2007. Willard came to Iona after spending 10 years as an assistant under Rick Pitino. In his third season with Iona, Willard led the Gaels to the 14th 20-win season in program history. It was a nine-win improvement from his first two seasons in New Rochelle. After inheriting a program that was 10th to last in the Ratings Percentage Index (RPI), (Note: The RPI was one of the primary metrics used in the NCAA basketball tournament selection process until being replaced by the NCAA Evaluation Tool in 2018.) the Gaels improved to a Top 80 RPI in 2009–10, the highest turnaround over that time span in NCAA Division I. After completing the turnaround, on March 28, 2010, Willard accepted the head coaching position at Seton Hall University, a school that competes in the Big East Conference.

=== Seton Hall ===
(Note: At the time Willard took the Seton Hall position, the school was a member of the original Big East Conference. When the Big East split in 2013, three schools left to join the Atlantic Coast Conference; Seton Hall and six other schools left to form a new conference that purchased the "Big East" name; and the remaining schools continued in operation under the original Big East charter with the new name of American Athletic Conference. The current Big East recognizes the history of the pre-2013 Big East as its own.) He led the Pirates to the 2016 Big East championship. On March 14, 2019, he became the first Pirates head coach to lead the team to four straight 20 win seasons. After Seton Hall beat Rutgers University on December 12, 2021, Willard passed P.J. Carlesimo for second place in program history with 213 wins. Only Honey Russell (295) has more wins than Willard. On March 21, 2022, Willard accepted the job to be the next head basketball coach at the University of Maryland.

=== Maryland ===
Willard led the Terps to an NCAA Tournament bid in his first season as head coach. The team beat West Virginia 67–65 in the Round of 64 before losing to Alabama 73–51 in the Round of 32.

In the 2024–2025 season, Willard led Maryland to a 27–9 record with a 14–6 conference record. Maryland earned the second seed in the Big Ten Tournament and defeated Illinois in the quarterfinals before losing to Michigan 81–80. Maryland earned a 4-seed in the NCAA Tournament, where Willard led the Terps to their first Sweet Sixteen since 2016. At the conclusion of the season, Willard was announced as the new head coach at Villanova.

=== Villanova ===
Willard's Villanova tenure began with a third-place finish in the Big East and returning the Wildcats to the NCAA Tournament for the first time since 2022, earning an 8-seed before falling to Utah State in the first round.

== Head coaching record ==
Record table
Season	Team	Overall	Conference	Standing	Postseason
Iona Gaels (Metro Atlantic Athletic Conference) (2007–2010)
2007–08	Iona	12–20	8–10	7th	
2008–09	Iona	12–19	7–11	7th	
2009–10	Iona	21–10	12–6	3rd	
Iona:		45–49 (.479)	27–27 (.500)		
Seton Hall Pirates (Big East Conference) (2010–2022)
2010–11	Seton Hall	13–17	7–11	12th	
2011–12	Seton Hall	21–13	8–10	10th	NIT Second Round
2012–13	Seton Hall	15–18	3–15	13th	
2013–14	Seton Hall	17–17	6–12	8th	
2014–15	Seton Hall	16–15	6–12	T–7th	
2015–16	Seton Hall	25–9	12–6	3rd	NCAA Division I Round of 64
2016–17	Seton Hall	21–12	10–8	T–3rd	NCAA Division I Round of 64
2017–18	Seton Hall	22–12	10–8	T–3rd	NCAA Division I Round of 32
2018–19	Seton Hall	20–14	9–9	T–3rd	NCAA Division I Round of 64
2019–20	Seton Hall	21–9	13–5	T–1st	NCAA Division I Canceled
2020–21	Seton Hall	14–13	10–9	5th	
2021–22	Seton Hall	21–11	11–8	T–5th	NCAA Division I Round of 64
Seton Hall:		225–161 (.583)	105–113 (.482)		
Maryland Terrapins (Big Ten Conference) (2022–2025)
2022–23	Maryland	22–13	11–9	T–5th	NCAA Division I Round of 32
2023–24	Maryland	16–17	7–13	T–12th	
2024–25	Maryland	27–9	14–6	T–2nd	NCAA Division I Sweet 16
Maryland:		65–39 (.625)	32–28 (.533)		
Villanova Wildcats (Big East Conference) (2025–present)
2025–26	Villanova	24–9	15–5	3rd	NCAA Division I Round of 64
2026–27	Villanova	4–2	0–0		
Villanova:		28–11 (.718)	15–5 (.750)		
Total:		363–260 (.583)			
National champion Postseason invitational champion Conference regular season champion Conference regular season and conference tournament champion Division regular season champion Division regular season and conference tournament champion Conference tournament champion
