= Greg St. Jean =

American basketball player and coach

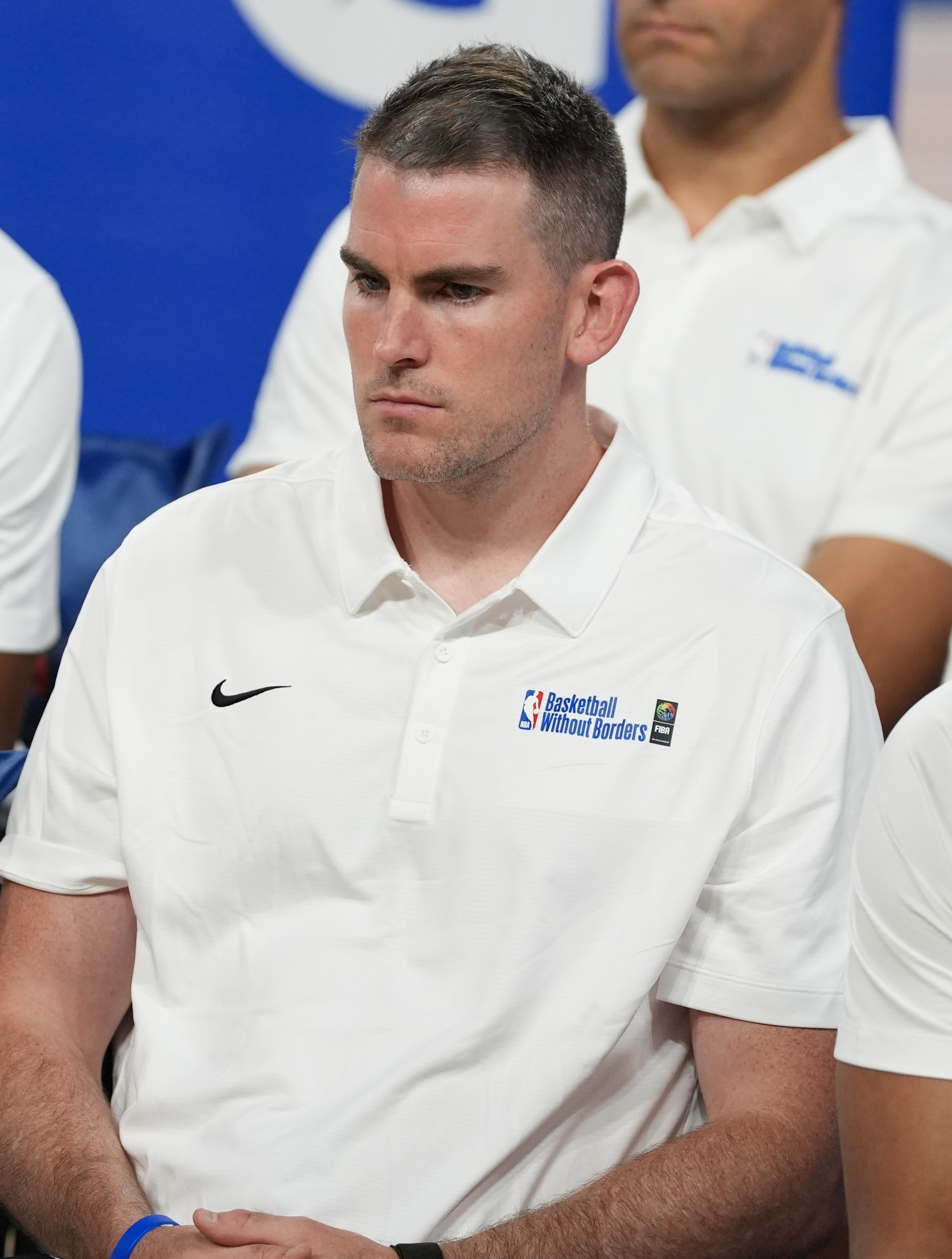
- St. Jean in 2026

Los Angeles Lakers
- Position: Assistant coach
- League: NBA

Personal information
- Born: San Francisco, California, U.S.

Career information
- High school: De La Salle (Concord, California); Phillips Exeter Academy (Exeter, New Hampshire)
- College: Wesleyan (2009–2013)
- NBA draft: 2013: undrafted
- Coaching career: 2013–present

Career history

Coaching
- 2013–2014: Sacramento Kings (video coordinator)
- 2014–2015: Sacramento Kings (assistant player development)
- 2015–2019: St. John's (assistant)
- 2019–2021: Los Angeles Lakers (assistant/player development)
- 2021–2023: Dallas Mavericks (assistant)
- 2023–2024: Phoenix Suns (assistant)
- 2024–present: Los Angeles Lakers (assistant)

Greg St. Jean is an American professional basketball coach and former player who is an assistant coach for the Los Angeles Lakers of the National Basketball Association (NBA).

== Playing career ==
St. Jean played for and graduated from Wesleyan University at the NCAA Division III level of college basketball from 2009 to 2013.

== Coaching career ==
In 2024, St. Jean was hired as an assistant coach for the Los Angeles Lakers under rookie head coach JJ Redick.

== Personal life ==
St. Jean attended De La Salle High School then one year of postgraduate prep at Phillips Exeter Academy. St. Jean is the son of Garry St. Jean, a former NBA head coach and executive.
