= Braeden Anderson =

Canadian basketball player and lawyer

K. Braeden Anderson
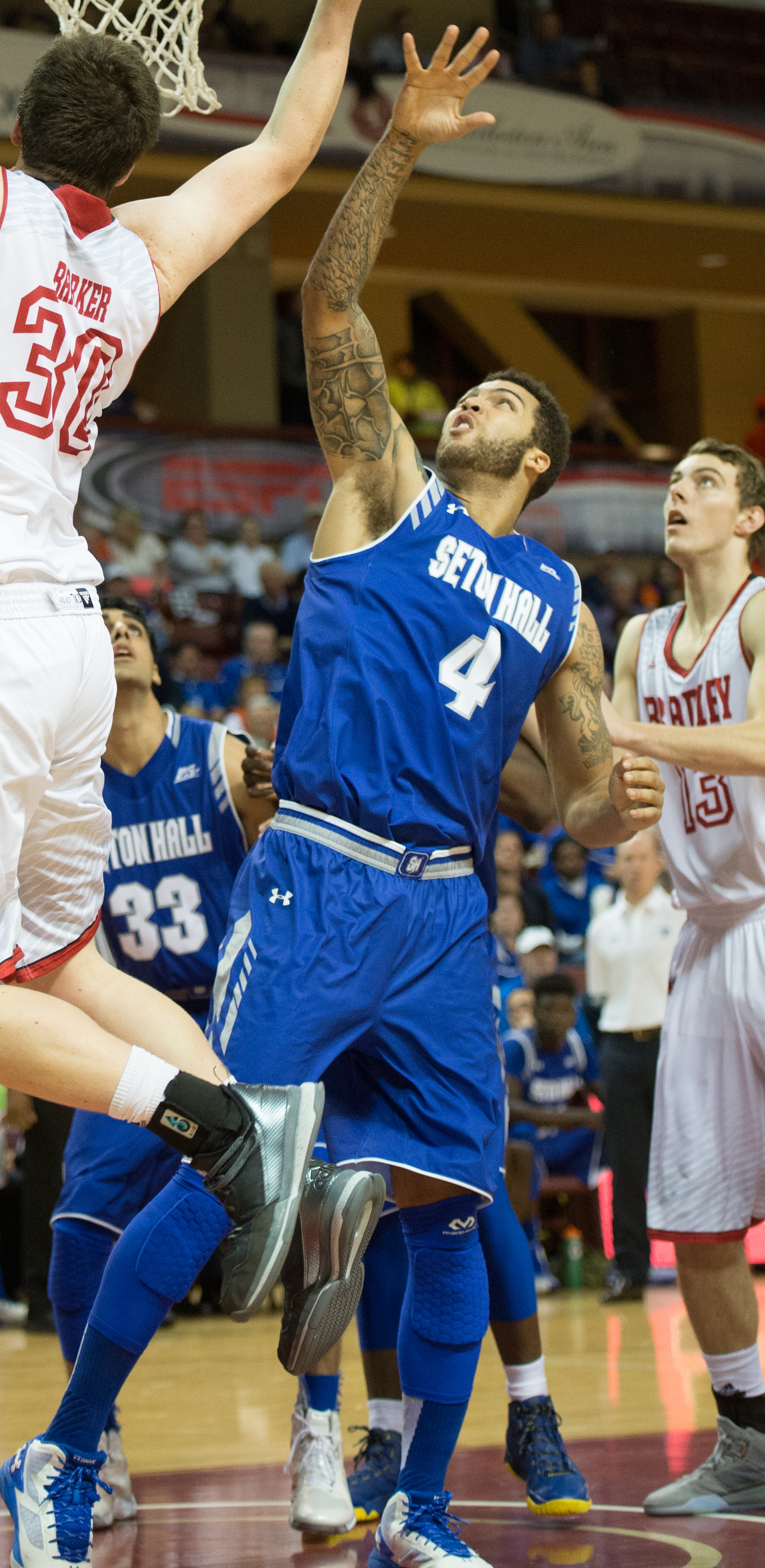
- Anderson (4) playing for Seton Hall
- Born: Okotoks, Alberta, Canada
- Education: Seton Hall University School of Law (J.D.)
- Occupation: Lawyer
- Website: K. Braeden Anderson

K. Braeden Anderson is a lawyer and former college basketball player. He played for the Seton Hall Pirates where he won the Big East Conference Championship with the team in 2016. Anderson made headlines in college for playing Division I basketball while attending law school. Standing 6-foot-9-inches (2.06 m) tall, Anderson played as a forward. He graduated from law school in 2018 and became an associate with the New York City law firm Sidley Austin. Anderson and his wife also operated food and coffee shops under the names Kook Burgers and Black Turtle Coffee in Pennsylvania, New Jersey, and New York which later closed.

== Basketball career ==
=== High school career ===
Growing up in Okotoks near Calgary, Anderson averaged 30 points and 15 rebounds as a 14 year old. When it was time for his senior season, he was rated as a top five prospect in Canada.

As a senior at the Wilbraham & Monson Academy, he averaged 18 points and nine rebounds per game. He participated in the All-Canada Classic, which gathers some of the top high school players in Canada, and was named to the Kentucky Derby Classic. Dubbed Mr. Canada Basketball, Anderson was a member of Canada senior Olympic team. He attended a high school in North Carolina and originally signed with DePaul in November 2010.

Being able to choose between Memphis, Arizona, Kentucky, Missouri and Kansas, Anderson committed to the Kansas Jayhawks in April 2011. In September, however, despite getting a 1450 on his SATs, he was declared a partial qualifier by the NCAA, making him academically ineligible to play. He was allowed to go to school and practice with the team, but he was not allowed to suit up on game day. Shortly thereafter, a Big 12 ruling forbid him from taking advantage of the scholarship that he had been given by Kansas head coach Bill Self.

The controversy surrounding Anderson's education in a school that was not recognized by the NCAA was covered in Fast Break, an episode of the Canadian newsmagazine The Fifth Estate, which featured Anderson himself.

=== College career ===
Not being able to afford to pay his own tuition, Anderson started his college career at Fresno State. Playing for the Bulldogs, he sat out the 2011–12 season and was forced to miss the first 20 games of the 2012-13 campaign. Despite being a member of the high school class of 2011, Anderson stepped on a college court for the first time on 6 February 2013. He played in 10 games, including seven starts, scoring a season-best 12 points with six rebounds on the road at San Diego State on 9 February.

Anderson missed the next season because of a near-fatal accident: on 3 September 2013, he broke his neck as his teammate's truck crashed into another car. He suffered a displacement of the C-5 through C-6 vertebrae, with a 0.6 percent chance of being discharged from the hospital. Anderson spent 28 days at Stanford Medical, where he was operated by Gene Carriagee, the orthopedic surgeon who performed Peyton Manning's neck surgery. Four major operations were followed by nine months of rehabilitation. Having been redshirted for the 2013–14 season, he shifted his focus toward academics and decided to become a corporate lawyer. Despite his injury, Anderson managed to finish the semester with a 4.0 GPA.

He ended up making a full recovery. Returning to the court as a sophomore in the 2014–15 season, Anderson played in 17 games, including seven starts. He scored a season-high five points in the Bulldogs' loss to Marist on 26 November 2014 and grabbed season-high six rebounds in season-high 27 minutes to help lead Fresno State to 63–57 win over Cal Poly on 13 December 2014.

In early February 2015, Anderson was released from his basketball responsibilities to focus on graduating and getting ready for law school. He finished his undergraduate degree in forensic behavioral science.

Anderson scored 161 in one attempt on his Law School Admission Test, landing him in the 82nd percentile. He weighed an offer from Penn State's law school, but it had no basketball option. Eventually, with two years of eligibility remaining, he transferred to Seton Hall so he could use scholarship money to pay for his first two years of law school. This was possible because of the NCAA's graduate transfer rule, which allows players with remaining eligibility to transfer with immediate eligibility when seeking a graduate degree in a major not offered by the current school.

Anderson has been described as playing "sparingly but aggressively, pursuing rebounds with abandon and setting an active tone on defense... a selfless role player, comfortable setting screens, running the floor and moving the ball"; "a rugged veteran, true banger, and interior defender with a solid right hook and up and under."

Anderson took 12 credits in his junior year. The dean of Seton Hall Law saluted him as "a tremendous role model" for any athlete wishing to take advantage of educational opportunities. He was the only active NCAA Division I men's basketball player who was known to be studying law in the 2015–16 season; two women's players, one at Iowa and the other at Baylor, were also law students in the same season.

== Legal and Business career ==
Anderson graduated from Seton Hall University School of Law in 2018. Upon passing the bar, he became an associate with the New York City firm Sidley Austin where he specialized in financial regulatory law.

In 2021, Anderson and his wife, Selena Gabrielle, founded Absecon Capital, a hospitality startup that operated the restaurant brands Kook Burger and Black Turtle Coffee with locations in Philadelphia, New Jersey, and New York. After roughly two years in business, the restaurants closed, and in April 2025 the couple filed for Chapter 13 bankruptcy protection, citing debts tied to the ventures, including unpaid wages and taxes. The businesses also faced a wage theft lawsuit from a former employee, who alleged unpaid hours and unfulfilled promises of housing and visa sponsorship.

== Personal life ==
His biological father, with whom he has had only sporadic contact, is a former player for the Nigeria national basketball team.
