= Butler Bulldogs men's basketball statistical leaders =

The Butler Bulldogs men's basketball statistical leaders are individual statistical leaders of the Butler Bulldogs men's basketball program in various categories, including points, rebounds, assists, steals, and blocks. Within those areas, the lists identify single-game, single-season, and career leaders. The Bulldogs represent Butler University in the NCAA's Big East Conference.

Butler began competing in intercollegiate basketball in 1896. However, the school's record book does not generally list records from before the 1950s, as records from before this period are often incomplete and inconsistent. Since scoring was much lower in this era, and teams played much fewer games during a typical season, it is likely that few or no players from this era would appear on these lists anyway.

The NCAA did not officially record assists as a stat until the 1983–84 season, and blocks and steals until the 1985–86 season, but Butler's record books includes players in these stats before these seasons. These lists are updated through the end of the 2020–21 season.

== Scoring ==
Career
| Rk | Player | Points | Seasons |
|---|---|---|---|
| 1 | Chad Tucker | 2,321 | 1983–84 1984–85 1985–86 1986–87 1987–88 |
| 2 | Kelan Martin | 2,047 | 2014–15 2015–16 2016–17 2017–18 |
| 3 | Darrin Fitzgerald | 2,019 | 1983–84 1984–85 1985–86 1986–87 |
| 4 | Kamar Baldwin | 1,956 | 2016–17 2017–18 2018–19 2019–20 |
| 5 | Kellen Dunham | 1,946 | 2012–13 2013–14 2014–15 2015–16 |
| 6 | Matt Howard | 1,939 | 2007–08 2008–09 2009–10 2010–11 |
| 7 | A. J. Graves | 1,807 | 2004–05 2005–06 2006–07 2007–08 |
| 8 | Lynn Mitchem | 1,798 | 1979–80 1980–81 1981–82 1982–83 |
| 9 | Darin Archbold | 1,744 | 1988–89 1989–90 1990–91 1991–92 |
| 10 | Billy Shepherd | 1,733 | 1969–70 1970–71 1971–72 |

Season
| Rk | Player | Points | Season |
|---|---|---|---|
| 1 | Darin Archbold | 770 | 1991–92 |
| 2 | Kelan Martin | 743 | 2017–18 |
| 3 | Darrin Fitzgerald | 734 | 1986–87 |
| 4 | Billy Shepherd | 724 | 1969–70 |
| 5 | Chad Tucker | 674 | 1987–88 |
| 6 | Darin Archbold | 633 | 1990–91 |
| 7 | Billy Shepherd | 623 | 1970–71 |
| 8 | Tim McRoberts | 614 | 1983–84 |
| 9 | Chad Tucker | 609 | 1985–86 |
| | Shelvin Mack | 609 | 2010–11 |

Single game
| Rk | Player | Points | Season | Opponent |
|---|---|---|---|---|
| 1 | Darrin Fitzgerald | 54 | 1986–87 | Detroit |
| 2 | Billy Shepherd | 49 | 1970–71 | Arizona |
| 3 | Oscar Evans | 44 | 1971–72 | Indianapolis |
| 4 | Billy Shepherd | 43 | 1970–71 | DePauw |
| 5 | Matthew Graves | 42 | 1997–98 | Clev. St. |
| | Darin Archbold | 42 | 1991–92 | Xavier |
| | Chad Tucker | 42 | 1987–88 | No. Ill. |
| | Billy Shepherd | 42 | 1969–70 | DePauw |
| 9 | Chad Tucker | 41 | 1987–88 | Detroit |
| | Bobby Plump | 41 | 1957–58 | Evansville |

== Rebounds ==
Career
| Rk | Player | Rebounds | Seasons |
|---|---|---|---|
| 1 | Daryl Mason | 961 | 1971–72 1972–73 1973–74 |
| 2 | Kameron Woods | 956 | 2011–12 2012–13 2013–14 2014–15 |
| 3 | Jeff Blue | 953 | 1961–62 1962–63 1963–64 |
| 4 | Matt Howard | 884 | 2007–08 2008–09 2009–10 2010–11 |
| 5 | Roosevelt Jones | 814 | 2011–12 2012–13 2014–15 2015–16 |
| 6 | Darren Fowlkes | 748 | 1985–86 1986–87 1987–88 1988–89 |
| 7 | Lynn Mitchem | 742 | 1979–80 1980–81 1981–82 1982–83 |
| 8 | Mike Marshall | 722 | 1996–97 1997–98 1998–99 1999–00 |
| 9 | Jon Neuhouser | 719 | 1994–95 1995–96 1996–97 1997–98 |
| 10 | Joel Cornette | 712 | 1999–00 2000–01 2001–02 2002–03 |

Season
| Rk | Player | Rebounds | Season |
|---|---|---|---|
| 1 | Michael Ajayi | 356 | 2025–26 |
| 2 | Daryl Mason | 354 | 1972–73 |
| 3 | Kameron Woods | 337 | 2014–15 |
| 4 | Jeff Blue | 336 | 1961–62 |
| 5 | Ed Schilling | 319 | 1965–66 |
| 6 | Daryl Mason | 318 | 1973–74 |
| 7 | Jeff Blue | 313 | 1963–64 |
| 8 | Gordon Hayward | 305 | 2009–10 |
| 9 | Jeff Blue | 304 | 1962–63 |
| 10 | Daryl Mason | 289 | 1971–72 |

Single game
| Rk | Player | Rebounds | Season | Opponent |
|---|---|---|---|---|
| 1 | Daryl Mason | 26 | 1972–73 | Evansville |
| 2 | Daryl Mason | 24 | 1973–74 | DePauw |
| | Jeff Blue | 24 | 1961–62 | Valparaiso |
| 4 | Jeff Blue | 23 | 1961–62 | Michigan |
| 5 | Daryl Mason | 22 | 1972–73 | Indianapolis |
| 6 | Jeff Blue | 21 | 1961–62 | DePauw |
| 7 | Jeff Blue | 20 | 1963–64 | Illinois |
| | Daryl Mason | 20 | 1972–73 | Valparaiso |
| | Marty Monserez | 20 | 1972–73 | Evansville |
| | Tim Haseley | 20 | 1983–84 | DePauw |
| | Garry Hoyt | 20 | 1968–69 | Ball State |
| | Michael Ajayi | 20 | 2025–26 | Northwestern |

== Assists ==
Career
| Rk | Player | Assists | Seasons |
|---|---|---|---|
| 1 | Aaron Thompson | 566 | 2017–18 2018–19 2019–20 2020–21 2021–22 |
| 2 | Thomas Jackson | 540 | 1998–99 1999–00 2000–01 2001–02 |
| 3 | Ronald Nored | 497 | 2008–09 2009–10 2010–11 2011–12 |
| 4 | Tim Bowen | 471 | 1989–90 1990–91 1991–92 1992–93 |
| 5 | Roosevelt Jones | 464 | 2011–12 2012–13 2014–15 2015–16 |
| 6 | Jeff Rogers | 457 | 1994–95 1995–96 1996–97 1997–98 |
| 7 | Darrin Fitzgerald | 411 | 1983–84 1984–85 1985–86 1986–87 |
| 8 | Kamar Baldwin | 364 | 2016–17 2017–18 2018–19 2019–20 |
| 9 | Shelvin Mack | 357 | 2008–09 2009–10 2010–11 |
| 10 | Avery Sheets | 323 | 2002–03 2003–04 2004–05 2005–06 |

Season
| Rk | Player | Assists | Season |
|---|---|---|---|
| 1 | Ronald Nored | 193 | 2011–12 |
| 2 | Mike Green | 172 | 2007–08 |
| 3 | Tim Bowen | 168 | 1990–91 |
| 4 | Thomas Jackson | 163 | 1999–00 |
| 5 | Jeff Rogers | 162 | 1996–97 |
| 6 | Posh Alexander | 156 | 2023–24 |
| 7 | Roosevelt Jones | 154 | 2015–16 |
| 8 | Thomas Jackson | 145 | 2001–02 |
| 9 | Mike Green | 144 | 2006–07 |
| 10 | Jeff Rogers | 143 | 1997–98 |

Single game
| Rk | Player | Assists | Season | Opponent |
|---|---|---|---|---|
| 1 | Thomas Jackson | 15 | 1999–00 | Detroit |
| 2 | Billy Shepherd | 14 | 1969–70 | Evansville |
| | Billy Shepherd | 14 | 1969–70 | Earlham |
| 4 | Travis Trice | 13 | 1993–94 | Mercer |
| | Billy Shepherd | 13 | 1971–72 | Evansville |
| | Billy Shepherd | 13 | 1970–71 | Illinois |
| 7 | Aaron Thompson | 12 | 2018–19 | Nebraska |
| | Mike Green | 12 | 2006–07 | Notre Dame |
| 9 | Thomas Jackson | 11 | 2001–02 | Evansville |
| | Darrin Fitzgerald | 11 | 1984–85 | Ball St. |
| | Billy Shepherd | 11 | 1971–72 | Indiana St. |
| | Tim Bowen | 11 | 1990–91 | Indiana St. |
| | Tim Bowen | 11 | 1990–91 | Dayton |
| | Travis Trice | 11 | 1994–95 | Wright St. |
| | Jeff Rogers | 11 | 1996–97 | Northern Ill. |
| | Roosevelt Jones | 11 | 2015–16 | SIUE |
| | Aaron Thompson | 11 | 2020–21 | Georgetown |
| | Posh Alexander | 11 | 2023–24 | Texas Tech |

== Steals ==
Career
| Rk | Player | Steals | Seasons |
|---|---|---|---|
| 1 | Thomas Jackson | 207 | 1998–99 1999–00 2000–01 2001–02 |
| | Ronald Nored | 207 | 2008–09 2009–10 2010–11 2011–12 |
| 3 | Kamar Baldwin | 196 | 2016–17 2017–18 2018–19 2019–20 |
| 4 | Alex Barlow | 187 | 2011–12 2012–13 2013–14 2014–15 |
| 5 | A. J. Graves | 183 | 2004–05 2005–06 2006–07 2007–08 |
| 6 | Darren Fowlkes | 176 | 1985–86 1986–87 1987–88 1988–89 |
| 7 | Darrin Fitzgerald | 156 | 1983–84 1984–85 1985–86 1986–87 |
| 8 | Aaron Thompson | 155 | 2017–18 2018–19 2019–20 2020–21 2021–22 |
| 9 | Rylan Hainje | 153 | 1998–99 1999–00 2000–01 2001–02 |
| 10 | Roosevelt Jones | 147 | 2011–12 2012–13 2014–15 2015–16 |

Season
| Rk | Player | Steals | Season |
|---|---|---|---|
| 1 | Thomas Jackson | 74 | 2001–02 |
| | Alex Barlow | 74 | 2014–15 |
| 3 | Posh Alexander | 71 | 2023–24 |
| 4 | Darren Fowlkes | 69 | 1986–87 |
| 5 | Ronald Nored | 67 | 2009–10 |
| 6 | Ronald Nored | 66 | 2011–12 |
| 7 | Alex Barlow | 61 | 2013–14 |
| | Tim Bowen | 61 | 1990–91 |
| 9 | Kamar Baldwin | 59 | 2016–17 |
| 10 | Kamar Baldwin | 54 | 2017–18 |
| | A. J. Graves | 54 | 2007–08 |

Single game
| Rk | Player | Steals | Season | Opponent |
|---|---|---|---|---|
| 1 | Brett Etherington | 8 | 1990–91 | Wisconsin |

== Blocks ==
Career
| Rk | Player | Blocks | Seasons |
|---|---|---|---|
| 1 | Rolf van Rijn | 203 | 1994–95 1995–96 1996–97 1997–98 |
| 2 | Joel Cornette | 144 | 1999–00 2000–01 2001–02 2002–03 |
| 3 | Matt Howard | 131 | 2007–08 2008–09 2009–10 2010–11 |
| 4 | Kameron Woods | 125 | 2011–12 2012–13 2013–14 2014–15 |
| 5 | Tyler Wideman | 104 | 2014–15 2015–16 2016–17 2017–18 |
| 6 | J. P. Brens | 100 | 1989–90 1990–91 1991–92 1992–93 |
| 7 | Darren Fowlkes | 82 | 1985–86 1986–87 1987–88 1988–89 |
| 8 | Mike Miller | 76 | 1978–79 1979–80 1980–81 |
| 9 | Brandon Polk | 73 | 2004–05 2005–06 |
| 10 | Tim Haseley | 72 | 1981–82 1982–83 1983–84 1984–85 |

Season
| Rk | Player | Blocks | Season |
|---|---|---|---|
| 1 | Rolf van Rijn | 64 | 1997–98 |
| | Rolf van Rijn | 64 | 1996–97 |
| 3 | Brandon Polk | 50 | 2005–06 |
| 4 | Tyler Wideman | 49 | 2015–16 |
| | Manny Bates | 49 | 2022–23 |
| 6 | Matt Howard | 48 | 2008–09 |
| | Rolf van Rijn | 48 | 1995–96 |
| 8 | Andre Screen | 45 | 2024–25 |
| 9 | Jalen Thomas | 41 | 2023–24 |
| 10 | Joel Cornette | 40 | 2000–01 |
| | J. P. Brens | 40 | 1990–91 |

Single game
| Rk | Player | Blocks | Season | Opponent |
|---|---|---|---|---|
| 1 | Darren Fowlkes | 7 | 1986–87 | Indiana State |
| | Rolf van Rijn | 7 | 1996–97 | Anderson |
| | Rolf van Rijn | 7 | 1997–98 | IUPUI |
