= 2015–16 Butler Bulldogs men's basketball team =

American college basketball season

2015–16 Butler Bulldogs men's basketball

NCAA tournament, Second Round
- Conference: Big East Conference
- Record: 22–11 (10–8 Big East)
- Head coach: Chris Holtmann (2nd season)
- Assistant coaches: Terry Johnson (9th season); Michael Lewis (5th season); Ryan Pedon (1st season)
- Home arena: Hinkle Fieldhouse

2015–16 Big East men's basketball standings
	Conf.				Overall
Team	W		L	PCT	W		L	PCT
No. 6 Villanova	16	–	2	.889	35	–	5	.875
No. 9 Xavier	14	–	4	.778	28	–	5	.848
No. 20 Seton Hall †	12	–	6	.667	25	–	9	.735
Providence	10	–	8	.556	24	–	11	.686
Butler	10	–	8	.556	22	–	11	.667
Creighton	9	–	9	.500	20	–	15	.571
Marquette	8	–	10	.444	20	–	13	.606
Georgetown	7	–	11	.389	15	–	18	.455
DePaul	3	–	15	.167	9	–	22	.290
St. John's	1	–	17	.056	8	–	24	.250
† 2016 Big East tournament winner Rankings from AP poll

The 2015–16 Butler Bulldogs men's basketball team represented Butler University in the 2015–16 NCAA Division I men's basketball season. Their head coach was Chris Holtmann, serving his second year. The Bulldogs played their home games at Hinkle Fieldhouse, which has a capacity of approximately 9,100. This was Butler's third season in the Big East Conference. They finished the season 22–11, 10–8 in Big East play to finish in a tie for fourth place. They lost in the quarterfinals of the Big East tournament to Providence. The Bulldogs received an at-large bid to the NCAA tournament where they defeated Texas Tech in the first round to advance to the second round where they lost to Virginia.

== Previous season ==
The Bulldogs finished the 2014–15 season with a record of 23–11, 12–6 in Big East play to finish in a tie for second place. Butler received an at-large bid to the NCAA tournament as a #6 seed and defeated Texas in the second round before losing in the Third Round to Notre Dame.

== Off season ==
With starting point guard Alex Barlow graduating in May 2015, Butler needed to add some depth in the guard position to back up Kellen Dunham and Tyler Lewis, who will be coming off of a redshirt season in 2014–15 due to transfer rules. On March 29, 2015, Jordan Gathers, a 6'3" combo guard from St. Bonaventure in the Atlantic 10 Conference announced his commitment to Butler after sitting out a season due to a hip injury. Barely a week and a half later, Butler gained another transfer from the Atlantic 10, this time in Kethan Savage from George Washington University. Savage, a 6'3" guard, will have to sit out a year per NCAA transfer regulations and will be available for the 2016–17 season. Gathers completed his degree at St. Bonaventure in three and a half years and therefore is immediately eligible to play.

There were also some changes in the coaching staff in the off season. On April 27, Butler announced the hire of Ryan Pedon, former assistant to Illinois head coach (and former Butler assistant) John Groce, as an assistant coach. Emerson Kampen, who was promoted to an assistant coaching position following Chris Holtmann's appointment as interim HC, was named Butler's new basketball analyst for the 2014–15 season.

Another major change occurred in August when it was announced that the playing surface in Hinkle Fieldhouse — the oldest playing surface still in use in the NCAA — was being sanded down to prepare for the new Bulldog logo at center court. The new design does not include the word "Butler" underneath the bulldog, and replaces the word "Bulldogs" on both end lines with "Butler." Also, the home sideline will have "Hinkle Fieldhouse" painted on it.

=== Departures ===
Name	Number	Pos.	Height	Weight	Year	Hometown	Notes
Jackson Aldridge	11	G	6'0"	180	Senior	Lane Cove, Australia	Graduated
Alex Barlow	3	G	5'11"	185	Senior	Springboro, OH	Graduated
Kameron Woods	31	F	6'9"	200	Senior	Middletown, KY	Graduated

=== 2015 recruiting class ===
College recruiting
Name	Hometown	School	Height	Weight	Commit date
Nate Fowler; Center	Cincinnati, OH	Archbishop Moeller HS	6 ft 10 in (2.08 m)	240 lb (110 kg)	May 27, 2014
Nate Fowler; Center	Recruit ratings: Scout: Rivals: ESPN: (80)				
Sean McDermott; Shooting Guard	Pendleton, IN	Pendleton Heights HS	6 ft 5 in (1.96 m)	170 lb (77 kg)	May 30, 2014
Sean McDermott; Shooting Guard	Recruit ratings: Scout: Rivals: ESPN: (NR)				
Jordan Gathers; Shooting Guard (Transfer)	Woodland Hills, CA	William Howard Taft HS / St. Bonaventure	6 ft 3 in (1.91 m)	200 lb (91 kg)	Mar 29, 2015
Jordan Gathers; Shooting Guard (Transfer)	Recruit ratings: Scout: Rivals: ESPN: (NR)				
Kethan Savage; Shooting Guard (Transfer)	Alexandria, VA	Episcopal HS / George Washington	6 ft 3 in (1.91 m)	203 lb (92 kg)	Apr 11, 2015
Kethan Savage; Shooting Guard (Transfer)	Recruit ratings: Scout: Rivals: ESPN: (88)				
Overall recruit ranking:
Note: In many cases, Scout, Rivals, 247Sports, On3, and ESPN may conflict in their listings of height and weight.; In these cases, the average was taken. ESPN grades are on a 100-point scale.; Sources: "2015 Butler Commitments". Rivals.; "Butler Bulldogs Men's Basketball Recruiting 2015". Scout.; "Butler Bulldogs Men's Basketball Recruiting 2015". ESPN.; "Scout.com Team Recruiting Rankings". Scout.; "2015 Team Ranking". Rivals.

== Roster ==
2015–16 Butler Bulldogs men's basketball team
Players
Coaches

Pos.	#	Name	Height	Weight	Year	Previous school	Hometown
G	25	Steven Bennett (W)	6 ft 2 in (1.88 m)	196 lb (89 kg)	Jr	New Castle	New Castle, IN
F	45	Andrew Chrabascz	6 ft 7 in (2.01 m)	225 lb (102 kg)	Jr	Cushing	Portsmouth, RI
G	24	Kellen Dunham	6 ft 6 in (1.98 m)	200 lb (91 kg)	Sr	Pendleton Heights	Pendleton, IN
G/F	21	Roosevelt Jones	6 ft 4 in (1.93 m)	225 lb (102 kg)	RS Sr	O'Fallon	O'Fallon, IL
F	30	Kelan Martin	6 ft 6 in (1.98 m)	235 lb (107 kg)	So	Ballard	Louisville, KY
F	4	Tyler Wideman	6 ft 8 in (2.03 m)	246 lb (112 kg)	So	Lake Central	Merrillville, IN
F	13	Jackson Davis	6 ft 8 in (2.03 m)	233 lb (106 kg)	So	Lafayette	Lexington, KY
F	0	Austin Etherington	6 ft 6 in (1.98 m)	220 lb (100 kg)	RS Sr	Hamilton Heights (Indiana)	Cicero, IN
G	1	Tyler Lewis	5 ft 11 in (1.8 m)	169 lb (77 kg)	RS Jr	Oak Hill Academy (VA) (N.C. State)	Statesville, NC
G	10	Trey Pettus (W)	6 ft 4 in (1.93 m)	198 lb (90 kg)	Jr	MICDS	St. Louis, MO
C	51	Nate Fowler	6 ft 10 in (2.08 m)	250 lb (113 kg)	Fr	Archbishop Moeller	Cincinnati, OH
G	22	Sean McDermott (redshirt)	6 ft 6 in (1.98 m)	182 lb (83 kg)	Fr	Pendleton Heights	Pendleton, IN
G	5	Jordan Gathers	6 ft 3 in (1.91 m)	205 lb (93 kg)	Sr	William Howard Taft (St. Bonaventure)	Woodland Hills, CA
G	11	Kethan Savage (redshirt)	6 ft 3 in (1.91 m)	201 lb (91 kg)	RS Jr	Episcopal (George Washington)	Alexandria, VA

Head coach

- Chris Holtmann (Taylor)

Assistant coach(es)

- Terry Johnson (Purdue Fort Wayne)
- Michael Lewis (Indiana)
- Ryan Pedon (Wooster)

Legend

- (C) Team captain
- (S) Suspended
- (I) Ineligible
- (W) Walk-on
- Injured
- Current redshirt

Roster
Last update: April 28, 2015

== Schedule ==
Date time, TV	Rank^{#}	Opponent^{#}	Result	Record	High points	High rebounds	High assists	Site (attendance) city, state
Exhibition
Oct 31, 2015*; 2:00 pm, WISH-TV	No. 24	Taylor	W 79–44		14 – Tied	11 – Wideman	3 – Jones	Hinkle Fieldhouse (6,892); Indianapolis, IN
Nov 7, 2015*; 7:00 pm, WISH-TV	No. 24	Saint Joseph's	W 106–66		19 – Jones	11 – Davis	8 – Lewis	Hinkle Fieldhouse (8,960); Indianapolis, IN
Non-conference regular season
Nov 14, 2015*; 7:30 pm, FS2	No. 24	The Citadel	W 144–71	1–0	24 – Dunham	11 – Jones	8 – Chrabascz	Hinkle Fieldhouse (8,440); Indianapolis, IN
Nov 19, 2015*; 1:30 pm, ESPNU	No. 22	vs. Missouri State; Puerto Rico Tip-Off Quarterfinals	W 93–59	2–0	18 – Tied	10 – Jones	10 – Lewis	Roberto Clemente Coliseum (1,601); San Juan, Puerto Rico
Nov 20, 2015*; 1:00 pm, ESPN2	No. 22	vs. Temple; Puerto Rico Tip-Off Semifinals	W 74–69	3–0	16 – Tied	11 – Jones	5 – Dunham	Roberto Clemente Coliseum (1,814); San Juan, Puerto Rico
Nov 22, 2015*; 7:30 pm, ESPN2	No. 22	vs. Miami (FL); Puerto Rico Tip-Off Championship	L 75–85	3–1	23 – Dunham	10 – Wideman	5 – Jones	Roberto Clemente Coliseum (5,309); San Juan, Puerto Rico
Nov 28, 2015*; 5:00 pm, FS2		SIU Edwardsville	W 89–73	4–1	32 – Dunham	6 – Tied	11 – Jones	Hinkle Fieldhouse (7,026); Indianapolis, IN
Dec 2, 2015*; 7:00 pm, CBSSN		at No. 17 Cincinnati	W 78–76	5–1	24 – Dunham	9 – Wideman	4 – Lewis	Fifth Third Arena (11,125); Cincinnati, OH
Dec 5, 2015*; 12:00 pm, FS1		Indiana State	W 85–71	6–1	24 – Martin	8 – Jones	7 – Jones	Hinkle Fieldhouse (8,142); Indianapolis, IN
Dec 7, 2015*; 7:00 pm, FSN	No. 18	VMI	W 93–66	7–1	20 – Martin	8 – Tied	5 – Lewis	Hinkle Fieldhouse (6,202); Indianapolis, IN
Dec 12, 2015*; 2:30 pm, FS1	No. 18	Tennessee	W 94–86	8–1	25 – Martin	11 – Martin	10 – Jones	Hinkle Fieldhouse (9,100); Indianapolis, IN
Dec 19, 2015*; 5:00 pm, BTN	No. 17	vs. No. 9 Purdue; Crossroads Classic	W 74–68	9–1	19 – Jones	11 – Jones	5 – Jones	Bankers Life Fieldhouse (19,156); Indianapolis, IN
Dec 22, 2015*; 8:30 pm, FS2	No. 9	Southern Utah	W 88–52	10–1	15 – Wideman	10 – Jones	8 – Lewis	Hinkle Fieldhouse (7,128); Indianapolis, IN
Dec 28, 2015*; 7:00 pm, FS2	No. 9	IUPUI	W 92–54	11–1	19 – Martin	6 – Tied	7 – Lewis	Hinkle Fieldhouse (8,210); Indianapolis, IN
Big East Conference Play
Dec 31, 2015; 2:30 pm, CBSSN	No. 9	No. 12 Providence	L 73–81	11–2 (0–1)	20 – Martin	9 – Martin	4 – Jones	Hinkle Fieldhouse (9,100); Indianapolis, IN
Jan 2, 2016; 1:00 pm, FS1	No. 9	at No. 6 Xavier; Big East New Year's Marathon	L 69–88	11–3 (0–2)	14 – Jones	7 – Martin	6 – Jones	Cintas Center (10,498); Cincinnati, OH
Jan 5, 2016; 8:00 pm, FSN	No. 18	at DePaul	W 77–72	12–3 (1–2)	24 – Dunham	5 – Wideman	7 – Lewis	Allstate Arena (5,427); Rosemont, IL
Jan 10, 2015; 7:30 pm, FS1	No. 18	No. 11 Villanova	L 55–60	12–4 (1–3)	20 – Jones	6 – Wideman	3 – Wideman	Hinkle Fieldhouse (9,144); Indianapolis, IN
Jan 16, 2016; Noon, FS1	No. 23	St. John's	W 78–58	13–4 (2–3)	24 – Dunham	10 – Martin	4 – Jones	Hinkle Fieldhouse (9,144); Indianapolis, IN
Jan 19, 2016; 6:30 pm, FS1	No. 18	at No. 16 Providence	L 68–71	13–5 (2–4)	21 – Dunham	11 – Martin	5 – Jones	Dunkin' Donuts Center (10,918); Providence, RI
Jan 23, 2016; 7:30 pm, FS1	No. 18	at Creighton	L 64–72	13–6 (2–5)	22 – Martin	11 – Martin	4 – Jones	CenturyLink Center (17,677); Omaha, NE
Jan 27, 2016; 7:00 pm, CBSSN		DePaul	W 67–53	14–6 (3–5)	23 – Jones	9 – Wideman	4 – Jones	Hinkle Fieldhouse (7,611); Indianapolis, IN
Jan 30, 2016; Noon, FS1		at Marquette	L 69–75	14–7 (3–6)	27 – Martin	8 – Wideman	6 – Jones	BMO Harris Bradley Center (15,234); Milwaukee, WI
Feb 2, 2016; 7:00 pm, FS1		Georgetown	W 87–76	15–7 (4–6)	35 – Martin	9 – Chrabascz	5 – Jones	Hinkle Fieldhouse (8,080); Indianapolis, IN
Feb 6, 2016; 4:30 pm, FSN		at St. John's	W 89–56	16–7 (5–6)	18 – Martin	14 – Jones	10 – Jones	Carnesecca Arena (5,602); Queens, NY
Feb 10, 2016; 6:30 pm, FS1		at Seton Hall	W 81–75	17–7 (6–6)	23 – Martin	10 – Martin	6 – Chrabascz	Prudential Center (7,476); Newark, NJ
Feb 13, 2016; 2:30 pm, FOX		No. 5 Xavier	L 57–74	17–8 (6–7)	15 – Martin	12 – Martin	4 – Jones	Hinkle Fieldhouse (9,344); Indianapolis, IN
Feb 16, 2016; 7:00 pm, FS1		Creighton	W 88–75	18–8 (7–7)	21 – Martin	8 – Martin	6 – Tied	Hinkle Fieldhouse (7,330); Indianapolis, IN
Feb 20, 2016; 2:30 pm, FOX		at No. 1 Villanova	L 67–77	18–9 (7–8)	19 – Martin	8 – Dunham	3 – Wideman	The Pavilion (6,500); Villanova, PA
Feb 27, 2016; Noon, CBS		at Georgetown	W 90–87 ^{OT}	19–9 (8–8)	29 – Dunham	8 – Wideman	4 – Chrabascz	Verizon Center (10,142); Washington, D.C.
Mar 2, 2016; 8:30 pm, FS1		Seton Hall	W 85–78	20–9 (9–8)	22 – Dunham	9 – Martin	5 – Jones	Hinkle Fieldhouse (7,392); Indianapolis, IN
Mar 5, 2016; 2:30 pm, FSN		Marquette	W 95–74	21–9 (10–8)	18 – Etherington	9 – Martin	6 – Jones	Hinkle Fieldhouse (9,244); Indianapolis, IN
Big East tournament
Mar 10, 2016; 2:30 pm, FS1	(5)	vs. (4) Providence; Quarterfinals	L 60–74	21–10	17 – Dunham	10 – Martin	5 – Jones	Madison Square Garden (14,863); New York, NY
NCAA tournament
Mar 17, 2016*; 12:40 pm, truTV	(9 MW)	vs. (8 MW) Texas Tech; First Round	W 71–61	22–10	23 – Dunham	8 – Jones	6 – Jones	PNC Arena (19,722); Raleigh, NC
Mar 19, 2016*; 7:10 pm, TBS	(9 MW)	vs. (1 MW) No. 4 Virginia; Second Round	L 69–77	22–11	25 – Chrabascz	5 – Tied	2 – Tied	PNC Arena (19,433); Raleigh, NC
*Non-conference game. ^{#}Rankings from AP Poll. (#) Tournament seedings in parentheses. MW=Midwest Region. All times are in Eastern Time.

== Rankings ==
Ranking movement Legend: ██ Improvement in ranking. ██ Decrease in ranking. RV=Received votes.
Poll	Pre	Wk 1	Wk 2	Wk 3	Wk 4	Wk 5	Wk 6	Wk 7	Wk 8	Wk 9	Wk 10	Wk 11	Wk 12	Wk 13	Wk 14	Wk 15	Wk 16	Wk 17	Wk 18	Post	Final
AP	24	24	22	RV	RV	18	17	9	9	18	23	18	RV	NR	NR	NR	NR	NR	RV	RV	N/A
Coaches	22	22	20	RV	25	21	18	12	10	19	23	24	RV	RV	NR	NR	NR	NR	RV	RV	RV

=== Awards ===
Name	Award(s)
Kellen Dunham	Preseason All-Big East First Team; Big East Player of the Week – Nov. 29–Dec.5; All-Big East Honorable Mention; Big East Sportsmanship Award; Big East Scholar-Athlete of the Year
Roosevelt Jones	Preseason All-Big East First Team; Puerto Rico Tip-Off All-Tournament Team; Big East Player of the Week – Dec. 13–19; CBS Sports National Player of the Week – Week 13; All-Big East Second Team
Kelan Martin	Big East Player of the Week – Dec. 6–12; Big East Player of the Week – Jan. 31–Feb. 6 All-Big East Second Team
