= 2012–13 Butler Bulldogs men's basketball team =

American college basketball season

2012–13 Butler Bulldogs men's basketball
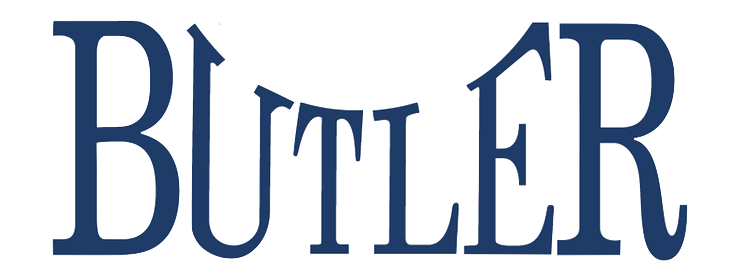

NCAA tournament, Round of 32
- Conference: Atlantic 10 Conference
- Record: 27–9 (11–5 A-10)
- Head coach: Brad Stevens (6th season)
- Associate head coach: Matthew Graves (10th season)
- Assistant coaches: Terry Johnson (6th season); Michael Lewis (2nd season)
- Home arena: Hinkle Fieldhouse

2012–13 Atlantic 10 men's basketball standings
| | Conf. | | | | Overall |
| Team | W | | L | PCT | W | | L | PCT |
|---|---|---|---|---|---|---|---|---|
| No. 16 Saint Louis † | 13 | – | 3 | .813 | 28 | – | 7 | .800 |
| No. 25 VCU | 12 | – | 4 | .750 | 27 | – | 9 | .750 |
| Butler | 11 | – | 5 | .688 | 27 | – | 9 | .750 |
| La Salle | 11 | – | 5 | .688 | 24 | – | 10 | .706 |
| Temple | 11 | – | 5 | .688 | 24 | – | 10 | .706 |
| UMass | 9 | – | 7 | .563 | 21 | – | 12 | .636 |
| Xavier | 9 | – | 7 | .563 | 17 | – | 14 | .548 |
| Charlotte | 8 | – | 8 | .500 | 21 | – | 12 | .636 |
| Saint Joseph's | 8 | – | 8 | .500 | 18 | – | 14 | .563 |
| Richmond | 8 | – | 8 | .500 | 19 | – | 15 | .559 |
| Dayton | 7 | – | 9 | .438 | 17 | – | 14 | .548 |
| St. Bonaventure | 7 | – | 9 | .438 | 14 | – | 15 | .483 |
| George Washington | 7 | – | 9 | .438 | 13 | – | 17 | .433 |
| Rhode Island | 3 | – | 13 | .188 | 8 | – | 21 | .276 |
| Fordham | 3 | – | 13 | .188 | 7 | – | 24 | .226 |
| Duquesne | 1 | – | 15 | .063 | 8 | – | 22 | .267 |
† 2013 Atlantic 10 Tournament winner As of March 28, 2013; Rankings from AP Poll

The 2012–13 Butler Bulldogs men's basketball team represented Butler University in the 2012–13 NCAA Division I men's basketball season. Their head coach was Brad Stevens, serving his 6th year. The Bulldogs played their home games at Hinkle Fieldhouse, which has a capacity of approximately 10,000. This was the first year that Butler competed in the Atlantic 10 Conference, as they moved from the Horizon League following the 2011–12 season. The Bulldogs returned all but three players, including Chase Stigall, who was a part-time starter in 2011–2012, and Roosevelt Jones, who "was a top flight recruit and did not disappoint [with] 7.8 points and a team high 6.0 rebounds last season."

They finished the season 27–9, 11–5 in A-10 play to finish in a three-way tie for third place. They advanced to the semifinals of the Atlantic 10 tournament where they lost to Saint Louis. They received an at-large bid to the 2013 NCAA tournament where they defeated Bucknell in the first round before losing in the second round to Marquette.

2012–13 was Butler's first and only season in the Atlantic 10 as they joined the so-called Catholic 7, along with Creighton and Xavier, in the new incarnation of the Big East Conference in July 2013.

== Off season ==
The Bulldogs left the Horizon League, of which it had been a founding member in 1979. The move to the Atlantic 10 Conference was announced on May 29, 2012, after earlier plans to move for the 2013–14 season were accelerated. Athletic Director Barry Collier explained, "Since announcing our intention to depart after 2012-13, Butler and the Horizon League have discussed the terms for next season. Ultimately, it was in our best interest to reach an agreement with the Horizon League for immediate departure." ESPN reported the move was because the Bulldogs "weren't going to be allowed to play in the [Horizon League conference tournament] so the choice was obvious – bolt to the A-10." ESPN further contended that "They will compete for the regular-season and conference tournament titles."

Over the summer, Butler added statistician Drew Cannon to the coaching staff. According to Sports Illustrated, it was "the first pure statistics-based hire" in college basketball.

Regarding the team's potential success for the 2012–13 season, ESPN analyst Eamonn Brennan posited, "It's fair to expect a drastic uptick in perimeter efficiency from this offense, and the same baseline defensive strength. If that's the case, there's no reason this group can't make a run at its first A-10 title in its very first opportunity." Jon Rothstein of CBS New York noted "The Bulldogs are much better suited to make the jump to the Atlantic 10 with [Roosevelt Jones] in their starting lineup. With brute strength and burgeoning point forward skills, Jones showed flashes of brilliance as a freshman, accumulating four double-doubles during the course of Butler’s season. Expect that number to at least double in 12-13."

On September 12, Coach Stevens announced junior guard Chrishawn Hopkins was dismissed from the team for violation of team rules. "I am sorry to have to announce that Chrishawn Hopkins has been dismissed from our team," he said. "We consider it a privilege to represent Butler University as a member of our team. With that privilege, comes a requirement and responsibility to meet the standard of our team rules. Dismissal is the consequence of a failure to do so." Hopkins, who was one of four returning starters, played in all 37 games during the 2011–12 season including 24 as a starter. Hopkins was expected to be the starting point guard. Two months later, Chris Harrison-Docks quit the team prior to the first regular season game.

=== Departures ===
| Name | Number | Pos. | Height | Weight | Year | Hometown | Notes |
|---|---|---|---|---|---|---|---|
| Garrett Butcher | 32 | F | 6'6" | 223 | Senior | Ellettsville, IN | Graduated |
| Chrishawn Hopkins | 20 | G | 6'1" | 161 | Sophomore | Indianapolis, IN | Dismissed |
| Ronald Nored | 5 | G | 6'0" | 177 | Senior | Homewood, AL | Graduated |

=== 2012 recruiting class ===
ESPN included Butler's 2012 recruiting class among its top recruiting classes from teams in non-BCS conferences, noting recruit Kellen Dunham was listed as an ESPN Top 100 recruit and is "a sniper to run off screens and create movement in the halfcourt sets for the next four years." In addition to Kellen Dunham, ESPN listed Devontae Morgan as "a playmaking combo guard" and Chris Harrison-Docks as a "more prototypical point." ESPN gave the class an overall grade of B+, tied as the second highest rating among teams in the Atlantic 10.

In ESPN's scouting report, Kellen Dunham was listed as the 78th best overall player, due in large part to the fact that what he "does really well is shoot the basketball. How he goes about his business is akin to a master craftsman applying his trade. Dunham is in constant motion, working to get himself in position to score and he's typically shot-ready." Dunham's reputation as an excellent shooter was further emphasized by Rivals listing him as the best shooter among all recruits of non-BCS teams. Devontae Morgan's scouting report from ESPN listed him as "a combination guard that is a excellent open court passer especially in draw and kick situations... Morgan is also a very capable of defending both guard positions as well." Finally, ESPN's scouting report lists Chris Harrison-Docks as "a tough competitor, dogged defender and unafraid of taking contact in the paint off penetration when driving into the lane for creative finishes" and further states that "He is a winner and the type of point guard you want on a championship level team."

Also new to the team in the 2012–13 season is transfer Rotnei Clarke, a guard from Oklahoma who sat out the 2011–12 season after transferring from Arkansas. Clarke is considered one of the season's top 50 players, in large part because of his 3-point shot, which averaged 43% in his last season at Arkansas. Clarke is held, along with Dunham, as a potential solution to Butler's struggles during the previous season. "Butler shot 27.2 percent from 3-point range; only four teams in Division I were worse. Fortunately, help is on the way. Arkansas transfer Rotnei Clarke, who averaged 43 percent from 3 and scored 15.2 points per game as a junior, is eligible to compete this fall, and Indiana native Kellen Dunham is a top-100 recruit known for one trait above all else: prodigious outside shooting. It's fair to expect a drastic uptick in perimeter efficiency from this offense, and the same baseline defensive strength. If that's the case, there's no reason this group can't make a run at its first A-10 title in its very first opportunity."

College recruiting
| Name | Hometown | School | Height | Weight | Commit date |
|---|---|---|---|---|---|
| Kellen Dunham; Shooting Guard | Pendleton, IN | Pendleton Heights HS | 6 ft 5 in (1.96 m) | 175 lb (79 kg) | Jul 1, 2010 |
| Kellen Dunham; Shooting Guard | Recruit ratings: Scout: Rivals: ESPN: (92) | | | | |
| Chris Harrison-Docks*; Point Guard | Okemos, MI | Okemos HS | 6 ft 0 in (1.83 m) | 155 lb (70 kg) | Apr 27, 2011 |
| Chris Harrison-Docks*; Point Guard | Recruit ratings: Scout: Rivals: ESPN: (82) | | | | |
| Devontae Morgan; Shooting Guard | Tampa, FL | Tampa Prep | 6 ft 3 in (1.91 m) | 182 lb (83 kg) | Jan 1, 2011 |
| Devontae Morgan; Shooting Guard | Recruit ratings: Scout: Rivals: ESPN: (85) | | | | |
Overall recruit ranking:
Note: In many cases, Scout, Rivals, 247Sports, On3, and ESPN may conflict in their listings of height and weight.; In these cases, the average was taken. ESPN grades are on a 100-point scale.; Sources: "Yahoo Sports: Rivals.com 2012 Butler Commitments". Rivals.; "Scout.com: Butler Bulldogs Men's Basketball Recruiting 2012". Scout.; "ESPN – Butler Bulldogs Basketball Recruiting 2012". ESPN.; "Scout.com Team Recruiting Rankings". Scout.; "2012 Team Ranking". Rivals.

=== Awards ===
| Name | awards |
|---|---|
| Rotnei Clarke | Atlantic 10 Preseason Second Team |
| Roosevelt Jones | Atlantic 10 Preseason Defensive Team |
| Kellen Dunham | Atlantic 10 Preseason Rookie Team |

== Roster ==
2012–13 Butler Bulldogs men's basketball team
Players
Coaches

| Pos. | # | Name | Height | Weight | Year | Previous school | Hometown |
|---|---|---|---|---|---|---|---|
| G | 11 | Jackson Aldridge | 6 ft 0 in (1.83 m) | 187 lb (85 kg) | So | Australian Institute of Sport | Lane Cove, Australia |
| G | 3 | Alex Barlow (W*) | 5 ft 11 in (1.8 m) | 187 lb (85 kg) | So | Archbishop Moeller | Springboro, OH |
| G | 15 | Rotnei Clarke | 6 ft 0 in (1.83 m) | 184 lb (83 kg) | RS Sr | Verdigris (Arkansas) | Verdigris, OK |
| G | 24 | Kellen Dunham | 6 ft 6 in (1.98 m) | 185 lb (84 kg) | Fr | Pendleton Heights | Pendleton, IN |
| F | 4 | Erik Fromm | 6 ft 8 in (2.03 m) | 223 lb (101 kg) | Jr | Bloomington South | Bloomington, IN |
| F | 21 | Roosevelt Jones | 6 ft 4 in (1.93 m) | 227 lb (103 kg) | So | O'Fallon | O'Fallon, IL |
| G | 22 | Elliott Kampen (W) | 6 ft 5 in (1.96 m) | 180 lb (82 kg) | So | Yorktown | Yorktown, IN |
| C | 30 | Emerson Kampen (W) | 6 ft 8 in (2.03 m) | 201 lb (91 kg) | RS Sr | Yorktown | Yorktown, IN |
| F | 23 | Khyle Marshall | 6 ft 6 in (1.98 m) | 216 lb (98 kg) | Jr | Flanagan | Davie, FL |
| G | 2 | Devontae Morgan | 6 ft 3 in (1.91 m) | 176 lb (80 kg) | Fr | Tampa Prep | Tampa, FL |
| G/F | 0 | Andrew Smeathers | 6 ft 6 in (1.98 m) | 185 lb (84 kg) | So | Center Grove | Bargersville, IN |
| C | 44 | Andrew Smith | 6 ft 11 in (2.11 m) | 243 lb (110 kg) | Sr | Covenant Christian | Zionsville, IN |
| G | 33 | Chase Stigall | 6 ft 3 in (1.91 m) | 196 lb (89 kg) | RS Sr | New Castle Chrysler | New Castle, IN |
| F | 31 | Kameron Woods | 6 ft 9 in (2.06 m) | 200 lb (91 kg) | So | Eastern | Middletown, KY |

Head coach

- Brad Stevens (DePauw)

Assistant coach(es)

- Matthew Graves (Butler)
  Associate head coach
- Terry Johnson (Purdue Fort Wayne)
- Michael Lewis (Indiana)

Legend

- (C) Team captain
- (S) Suspended
- (I) Ineligible
- (W) Walk-on
- Injured
- Current redshirt

Roster
Last update: 22 August 2012

- Barlow started the year as a walk-on but was granted a scholarship for the second semester.

== Regular season ==
=== Schedule ===
| Date time, TV | Rank^{#} | Opponent^{#} | Result | Record | High points | High rebounds | High assists | Site (attendance) city, state |
Exhibition
| Oct. 27*; 2:00 pm | | Marian | W 62–40 | – | 12 – Tied | 8 – Woods | 8 – Woods | Hinkle Fieldhouse (5,541); Indianapolis, IN |
| Nov. 03*; 7:00 pm | | UIndy | W 63–47 | – | 18 – Clarke | 9 – Tied | 2 – Clarke | Hinkle Fieldhouse (8,163); Indianapolis, IN |
Regular Season
| Nov. 10*; 2:00 pm, WNDY | | Elon | W 74–59 | 1–0 | 21 – Clarke | 9 – Jones | 6 – Jones | Hinkle Fieldhouse (6,309); Indianapolis, IN |
| Nov. 13; 4:00 pm, ESPN | | at Xavier; College Hoops Tip-Off Marathon | L 47–62 | 1–1 | 11 – Dunham | 7 – Jones | 5 – Clarke | Cintas Center (9,876); Cincinnati, OH |
| Nov. 19*; 3:30 pm, ESPN2 | | vs. Marquette; Maui Invitational Quarterfinals | W 72–71 | 2–1 | 24 – Marshall | 9 – Marshall | 4 – Jones | Lahaina Civic Center (2,400); Lahaina, HI |
| Nov. 20*; 8 p.m., ESPN | | vs. No. 9 North Carolina; Maui Invitational Semifinals | W 82–71 | 3–1 | 17 – Tied | 11 – Marshall | 4 – Jones | Lahaina Civic Center (2,400); Lahaina, HI |
| Nov. 21*; 10 p.m., ESPN | | vs. Illinois; Maui Invitational Championship Game | L 61–78 | 3–2 | 27 – Clarke | 8 – Woods | 3 – Jones | Lahaina Civic Center (2,400); Lahaina, HI |
| Nov. 27*; 7:00 pm, WNDY | | Hanover | W 97–73 | 4–2 | 19 – Tied | 8 – Jones | 3 – 5 tied | Hinkle Fieldhouse (5,547); Indianapolis, IN |
| Dec. 01*; 2:00 pm, WNDY | | Ball State | W 67–53 | 5–2 | 15 – Clarke | 6 – Marshall | 5 – Clarke | Hinkle Fieldhouse (8,282); Indianapolis, IN |
| Dec. 05*; 7:00 pm, WNDY | | IUPUI | W 87–55 | 6–2 | 17 – Tied | 5 – Woods | 5 – Aldridge | Hinkle Fieldhouse (5,533); Indianapolis, IN |
| Dec. 08*; 8:00 pm, BTN | | at Northwestern | W 74–65 | 7–2 | 24 – Smith | 10 – Smith | 4 – Barlow | Welsh-Ryan Arena (7,213); Evanston, IL |
| Dec. 15*; 2:00 pm, CBS | | vs. No. 1 Indiana; Crossroads Classic | W 88–86 ^{OT} | 8–2 | 19 – Clarke | 12 – Jones | 7 – Jones | Bankers Life Fieldhouse (19,192); Indianapolis, IN |
| Dec. 22*; 2:00 pm, WNDY | No. 19 | Evansville | W 75–67 | 9–2 | 20 – Tied | 12 – Woods | 4 – Smith | Hinkle Fieldhouse (9,190); Indianapolis, IN |
| Dec. 29*; 8:00 pm, ESPNU | No. 18 | at Vanderbilt | W 68–49 | 10–2 | 22 – Clarke | 11 – Marshall | 3 – 3 tied | Memorial Gymnasium (11,990); Nashville, TN |
| Jan. 02*; 7:00 pm, WNDY | No. 17 | Penn | W 70–57 | 11–2 | 24 – Jones | 8 – Woods | 3 – Jones | Hinkle Fieldhouse (6,406); Indianapolis, IN |
| Jan. 05*; 2:00 pm, WNDY | No. 17 | New Orleans | W 57–44 | 12–2 | 15 – Dunham | 8 – Marshall | 4 – Jones | Hinkle Fieldhouse (7,076); Indianapolis, IN |
Atlantic 10 Conference Play
| Jan. 09; 7:00 pm | No. 14 | at Saint Joseph's | W 72–66 | 13–2 (1–0) | 28 – Clarke | 10 – Smith | 6 – Jones | Hagan Arena (4,200); Philadelphia, PA |
| Jan. 12; 2:00 pm, NBCSN | No. 14 | at Dayton | W 79–73 | 14–2 (2–0) | 16 – Jones | 7 – Jones | 4 – Tied | University of Dayton Arena (13,455); Dayton, OH |
| Jan. 16; 7:00 pm, WNDY | No. 13 | Richmond | W 62–47 | 15–2 (3–0) | 15 – Smith | 12 – Jones | 4 – Tied | Hinkle Fieldhouse (7,022); Indianapolis, IN |
| Jan. 19*; 9:00 pm, ESPN | No. 13 | No. 8 Gonzaga; ESPN College GameDay | W 64–63 | 16–2 | 20 – Jones | 7 – Smith | 6 – Barlow | Hinkle Fieldhouse (10,228); Indianapolis, IN |
| Jan. 23; 7:00 pm | No. 9 | at La Salle | L 53–54 | 16–3 (3–1) | 16 – Smith | 8 – Smith | 5 – Barlow, Jones | Tom Gola Arena (3,400); Philadelphia, PA |
| Jan. 26; 6:00 pm, ESPN2 | No. 9 | Temple | W 83–71 | 17–3 (4–1) | 24 – Clarke | 5 – 3 tied | 9 – Clarke | Hinkle Fieldhouse (10,000); Indianapolis, IN |
| Jan. 31; 9:00 pm, CBSSN | No. 9 | at Saint Louis | L 58–75 | 17–4 (4–2) | 17 – Clarke | 7 – Dunham | 4 – Jones | Chaifetz Arena (10,612); Saint Louis, MO |
| Feb. 02; 4:00 pm, CBSSN | No. 9 | Rhode Island | W 75–68 | 18–4 (5–2) | 23 – Clarke | 6 – Jones | 4 – Jones | Hinkle Fieldhouse (10,000); Indianapolis, IN |
| Feb. 06; 7:00 pm, CBSSN | No. 14 | St. Bonaventure | W 77–58 | 19–4 (6–2) | 17 – Clarke | 7 – Smith | 5 – Clarke | Hinkle Fieldhouse (6,591); Indianapolis, IN |
| Feb. 09; 2:00 pm | No. 14 | at George Washington | W 59–56 | 20–4 (7–2) | 14 – Clarke | 9 – Marshall | 4 – Clarke | Smith Center (4,488); Washington, D.C. |
| Feb. 13; 7:00 pm, WNDY | No. 11 | Charlotte | L 67–71 | 20–5 (7–3) | 18 – Clarke | 9 – Tied | 3 – Clarke | Hinkle Fieldhouse (7,009); Indianapolis, IN |
| Feb. 16; 4:00 pm, CBSSN | No. 11 | at Fordham | W 68–63 | 21–5 (8–3) | 22 – Clarke | 10 – Woods | 4 – Clarke | Rose Hill Gymnasium (3,200); Bronx, NY |
| Feb. 19; 7:00 pm, WNDY | No. 15 | Duquesne | W 68–49 | 22–5 (9–3) | 16 – Clarke | 10 – Smith | 5 – Jones | Hinkle Fieldhouse (7,193); Indianapolis, IN |
| Feb. 22; 7:00 pm, ESPNU | No. 15 | Saint Louis | L 61–65 | 22–6 (9–4) | 14 – Dunham | 9 – Smith | 3 – Tied | Hinkle Fieldhouse (10,000); Indianapolis, IN |
| Mar. 02; 12:00 pm, ESPN2 | No. 20 | at VCU | L 52–84 | 22–7 (9–5) | 14 – Jones | 10 – Woods | 2 – 4 tied | Siegel Center (7,693); Richmond, VA |
| Mar. 07; 7:00 pm, NBCSN | | at Massachusetts | W 73–62 | 23–7 (10–5) | 17 – Tied | 15 – Smith | 8 – Jones | Mullins Center (9,341); Amherst, MA |
| Mar. 09; 6:30 pm, CBSSN | | Xavier | W 67–62 | 24–7 (11–5) | 21 – Clarke | 5 – 4 tied | 4 – Jones | Hinkle Fieldhouse (10,000); Indianapolis, IN |
Atlantic 10 Tournament
| Mar. 14; 2:48 pm, NBCSN | (5) | vs. (12) Dayton; First Round | W 73–67 | 25–7 | 21 – Clarke | 7 – Woods | 6 – Jones | Barclays Center (N/A); Brooklyn, NY |
| Mar. 15; 2:40 pm, CSN | (5) | vs. (4) La Salle; Quarterfinal | W 69–58 | 26–7 | 14 – Clarke | 9 – Woods | 3 – Tied | Barclays Center (N/A); Brooklyn, NY |
| Mar. 16; 1:30 pm, CBSSN | (5) | vs. (1) No. 16 Saint Louis; Semifinal | L 56–67 | 26–8 | 16 – Clarke | 8 – Jones | 2 – Tied | Barclays Center (N/A); Brooklyn, NY |
2013 NCAA Tournament
| March 21*; 12:40 pm, truTV | (6 E) | vs. (11 E) Bucknell; First Round | W 68–56 | 27–8 | 17 – Clarke | 16 – Smith | 4 – Jones | Rupp Arena (14,622); Lexington, KY |
| March 23*; 8:03 pm, CBS | (6 E) | vs. (3 E) No. 15 Marquette; Second Round | L 72–74 | 27–9 | 24 – Clarke | 8 – Smith | 3 – Tied | Rupp Arena (20,601); Lexington, KY |
*Non-conference game. ^{#}Rankings from AP Poll. (#) Tournament seedings in parentheses. All times are in Eastern Time. (#) during NCAA Tournament is seed with Region E=East.

=== Awards ===
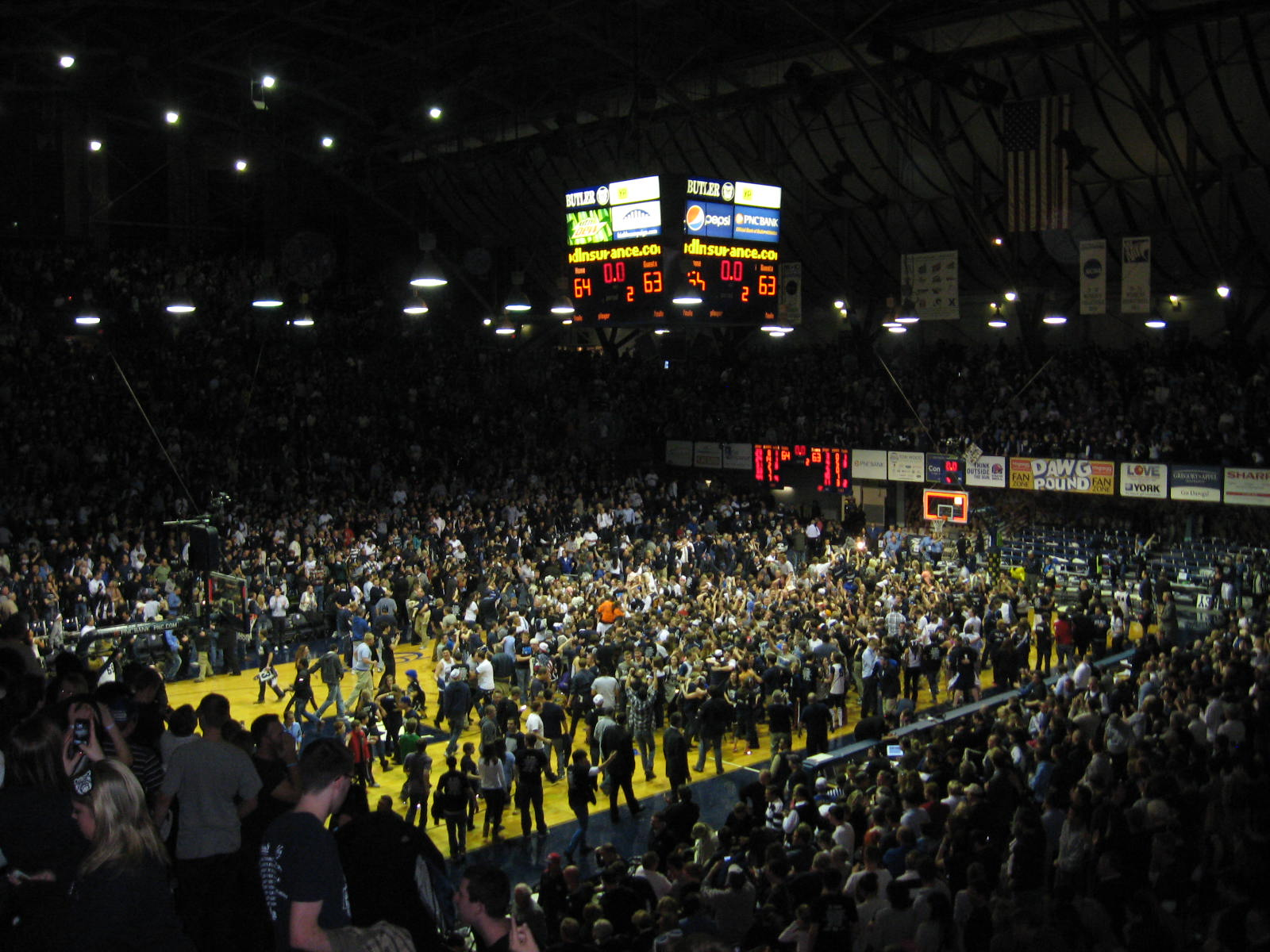
Perhaps the highlight of the season was the then 13th ranked Bulldogs upsetting the 8th ranked Gonzaga Bulldogs on a last-second shot by Roosevelt Jones. Shown here are the students flooding the court following the shot.

| Name | awards |
|---|---|
| Rotnei Clarke | Maui Invitational All-Tournament Team; Atlantic 10 Player of the Week - November 26; Atlantic 10 All-Conference, First Team |
| Kellen Dunham | Atlantic 10 Rookie of the Week - November 12; Atlantic 10 Rookie of the Week - December 10; Atlantic 10 Rookie of the Week - December 31; Atlantic 10 Rookie of the Week - January 28; Atlantic 10 All-Rookie Team |
| Roosevelt Jones | Atlantic 10 Player of the Week - December 17; Atlantic 10 Co-Player of the Week - January 21; Oscar Robertson National Player of the Week - January 22; Atlantic 10 All-Defensive Team |
| Andrew Smith | Academic All-America - Second Team; Atlantic 10 Player of the Week - January 14; Atlantic 10 All-Academic Team |

=== Clarke injury ===
During the game at Dayton on January 12, Rotnei Clarke was fouled in mid-air by Dayton's Matt Derenbecker and was thrown head-first into the base of the backboard support. "Clarke remained down on the court for almost eight minutes before being taken off the floor via stretcher, flashing a thumbs up to the crowd as he left." Before leaving the court, Clarke was overheard initially saying "I can't move" before reporting numbness in his hands. Clarke later recalled, "I feel blessed to be walking. When I hit my head, I rolled over and I couldn’t feel anything from my neck down. That’s what scared me the most. My body was just tingling." Clarke gave a "thumbs-up" sign as he was wheeled off the court en route to Miami Valley Hospital where it was confirmed he had a sprained neck, no fractures, and no spinal cord damage. Derenbecker was assessed a flagrant foul. After the game, Derenbecker described his interaction with Butler's Coach Stevens during the post-game handshake: "I said 'Coach, please tell Rotnei it was not on purpose.' And he said, 'Matt, I know it wasn't on purpose. Don't worry.' It felt good to know that a coach of his caliber was able to realize that it wasn't a dirty play."

== Rankings ==
Ranking movement Legend: ██ Improvement in ranking. ██ Decrease in ranking. RV=Received votes.
| Poll | Pre | Wk 1 | Wk 2 | Wk 3 | Wk 4 | Wk 5 | Wk 6 | Wk 7 | Wk 8 | Wk 9 | Wk 10 | Wk 11 | Wk 12 | Wk 13 | Wk 14 | Wk 15 | Wk 16 | Wk 17 | Wk 18 | Final |
|---|---|---|---|---|---|---|---|---|---|---|---|---|---|---|---|---|---|---|---|---|
| AP | | RV | | RV | RV | RV | 19 | 18 | 17 | 14 | 13 | 9 | 9 | 14 | 11 | 15 | 20 | | | RV |
| Coaches | RV | | | RV | RV | RV | 25 | 21 | 20 | 17 | 13 | 9 | 10 | 14 | 10 | 15 | 21 | | | RV |
