= Kelan Martin =

American basketball player (born 1995)

- Martin with Beşiktaş in 2025

No. 30 – Illawarra Hawks
- Position: Small forward
- League: NBL

Personal information
- Born: August 3, 1995 (age 31) Louisville, Kentucky, U.S.
- Listed height: 6 ft 5 in (1.96 m)
- Listed weight: 230 lb (104 kg)

Career information
- High school: Ballard (Louisville, Kentucky)
- College: Butler (2014–2018)
- NBA draft: 2018: undrafted
- Playing career: 2018–present

Career history
- 2018–2019: MHP Riesen Ludwigsburg
- 2019–2020: Minnesota Timberwolves
- 2019–2020: →Iowa Wolves
- 2020–2022: Indiana Pacers
- 2022: Boston Celtics
- 2022: Grand Rapids Gold
- 2022–2023: Birmingham Squadron
- 2023–2024: Pınar Karşıyaka
- 2024–2025: Beşiktaş
- 2026: UCAM Murcia
- 2026–present: Illawarra Hawks

Career highlights
- AP Honorable Mention All-American (2018); First-team All-Big East (2018); 2× Second-team All-Big East (2016, 2017)
- Stats at NBA.com
- Stats at Basketball Reference

Kelan Dewayne Martin (born August 3, 1995) is an American professional basketball player for the Illawarra Hawks of the Australian National Basketball League (NBL). He attended Ballard High School in Louisville, Kentucky, and played college basketball for the Butler Bulldogs, where he scored 2,047 points during his career, the second highest in the school's history. Martin was selected for the All-Big East second team on two occasions, the All-District 5 second team by the National Association of Basketball Coaches, and as a senior, he was named to the All-Big East first team.

== Early life ==
Martin comes from a basketball family. His father, Kenneth, was on the state championship team at Louisville's Ballard High School and won an NCAA Division II championship at Kentucky Wesleyan. His mother, the former Kristie Jordan, was honored with a retired jersey at Ballard and competed for an NCAA runner-up team at Western Kentucky. They met at the age of eight growing up in housing projects in downtown Louisville and married after college. As of 2017 Kenneth works as assistant director of pupil personnel for Jefferson County Public Schools, while Kristie works in administration monitoring Louisville's police budget. Kelan has a younger brother, Kameron, and was raised with cousin Jalil Brown, the son of Kristie's deceased sister.

Growing up, Kelan preferred American football to basketball. He competed for Louisville Legends summer teams in middle school, where he was nicknamed "Baby Shaq" by Rajon Rondo. While at Ballard High School, he competed for the AAU team Indiana Elite, where future Louisville player Quentin Snider starred. Martin measured 6 feet 5 inches (1.96 m) as a freshman at Ballard and started several games. He stopped playing football as a sophomore and worked on improving his running ability. As a junior, Martin guided Ballard to the Sweet 16 of the Kentucky basketball tournament, recording 23 points and 14 rebounds in the Bruins' 59–55 victory over Montgomery County at Rupp Arena. In the championship, Martin scored 19 points and pulled down 12 rebounds, but Madison County beat Ballard 65–64. He averaged 19.1 points and 10.2 rebounds as a junior and was named to the Second Team All-State.

Coach Chris Renner called Martin's senior year the best season of any player he coached at Ballard. The Bruins were ranked number one in Kentucky. Although outshone by Quentin Snider, Martin scored 16 points in an overtime loss to Trey Lyles-led Arsenal Tech. He had 28 points, including the deciding three-pointer, when Ballard beat Myles Turner and Trinity High School (Euless, Texas) 72–70. In another game against Doss High School, Martin scored 36 points, and coach Renner started isolating him from practices since he overwhelmed team scrimmages. The season ended when the Bruins lost to Trinity High School (Louisville) in the regional championship 59–58. He scored 2,014 points in his career, third in school history. As a senior, Martin averaged 22.8 points and 8.7 rebounds per game, shooting 37 percent from three-point range.

His first recruiting offer was from IUPUI, coached by his father's high school teammate Todd Howard. Martin was first recruited to Butler by Brad Stevens, and his recruitment continued under Brandon Miller. He considered Providence, St. Louis, West Virginia and Oklahoma but chose Butler because he liked the coaches and players. When Quentin Snider decommitted from Illinois and selected Louisville, Martin's friends thought he should follow suit but he remained firm in his commitment to the Bulldogs. He was ranked 139th nationally by Rivals.com and was a finalist for Kentucky Mr. Basketball.

College recruiting
Name	Hometown	School	Height	Weight	Commit date
Kelan Martin; Power Forward	Louisville, KY	Ballard High School	6 ft 6 in (1.98 m)	210 lb (95 kg)	Oct 8, 2013
Kelan Martin; Power Forward	Recruit ratings: Scout: Rivals: 247Sports: ESPN: (80)				

== College career ==
=== Freshman season (2014–2015) ===
By the time Martin arrived on campus, Chris Holtmann was the coach. On November 22, 2014, Martin had a season-high 23 points to go along with seven rebounds in a win over Loyola (Maryland). The following game, Martin had 17 points in 17 minutes in a 74–66 upset over fifth-ranked North Carolina. He was named Big East Rookie of the Week on March 9, 2015, after scoring 14 points against Providence. Martin averaged 7.1 points and 2.1 rebounds in 14.5 minutes per game.

=== Sophomore season (2015–2016) ===
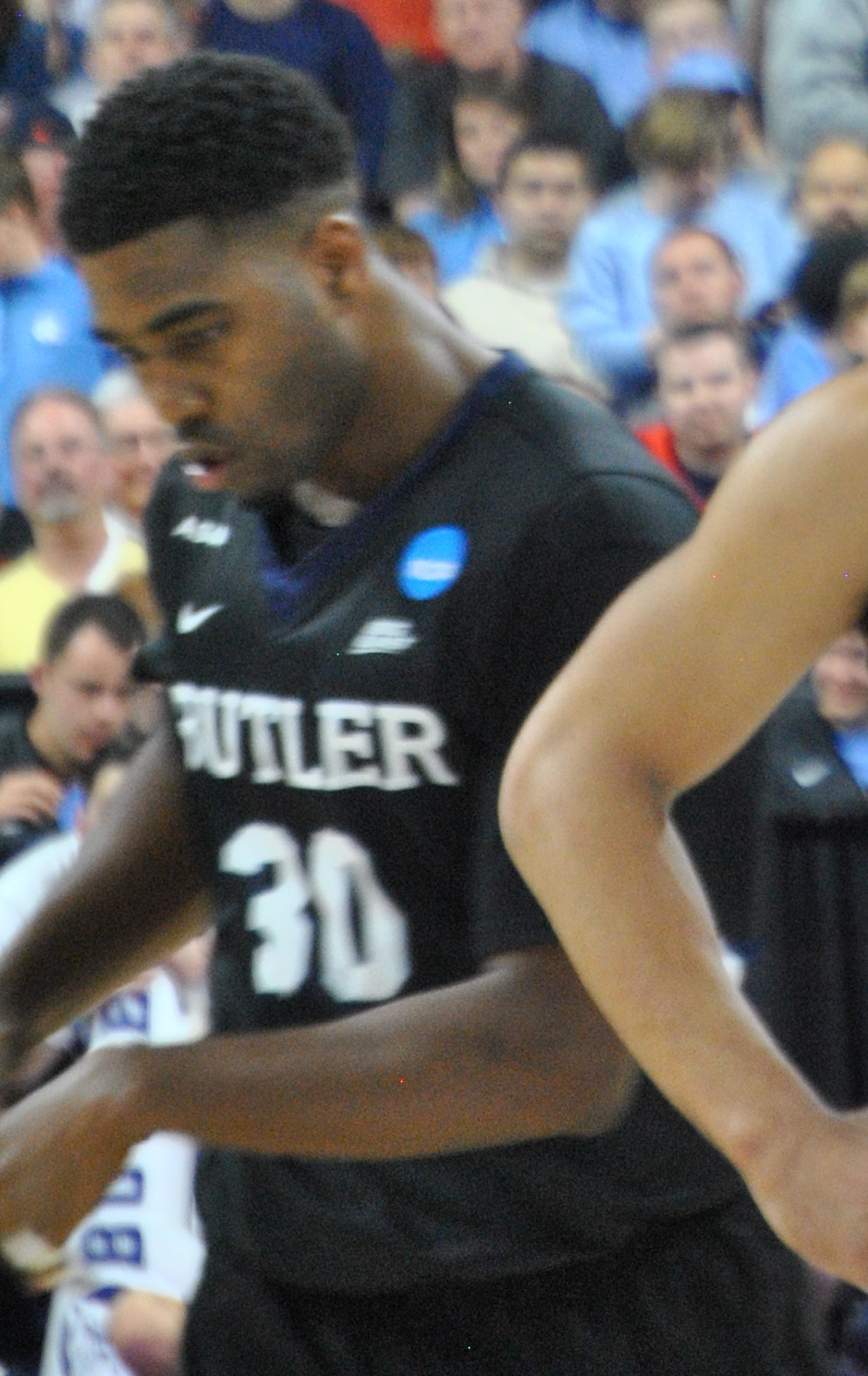
Martin with Butler in 2016

He scored 35 points and grabbed eight rebounds in an 87–76 win against Georgetown on February 2, 2016, the most by a Butler player since 1998. He was twice named the Big East Player of the Week on December 14 and February 8. Over the course of the season, he had eight double-doubles in both points and rebounds, and 10 games with 20 or more points.

Martin averaged 15.7 points and 6.8 rebounds per game as a sophomore on a team led by Kellen Dunham and Roosevelt Jones. He was marred by a slump of form at the end of the season. In the Round of 64 of the NCAA tournament, Martin scored eight points in 51 seconds to propel the Bulldogs to a 71–61 win against Texas Tech. As a sophomore, Martin was named to the Second Team All-Big East. After the season, he lost some weight and attended a training camp in Long Beach, California.

=== Junior season (2016–2017) ===
Coming into his junior year, Martin was named to the Preseason First Team All-Big East. Martin was named Big East Player of the Week on December 19, 2016, after scoring 28 points on 9-of-16 shooting in an 83–78 victory over Indiana. He did this despite going scoreless for the first 15 minutes. He had 22 points on January 28, 2017, against Georgetown. In the final nine games of the season, after a slump in February, he came off the bench to average 17.7 points per game while shooting 50 percent. He was again named Big East Player of the Week on February 27, 2017, after a week in which he scored 22 points and pulled down eight rebounds in a 74–66 upset over Villanova and posted 25 points and seven rebounds in an 88–79 victory against Xavier.

Despite dealing with lower back spasms, Martin scored 19 points, grabbed six rebounds, and made four assists in Butler's 74–65 victory over Middle Tennessee State to reach the Sweet 16. In his junior season, Martin led the Bulldogs in scoring (16.0 points per game) and rebounding (5.8 per game) while shooting 43 percent from the floor and 35 percent from behind the arc. He was one of ten finalists for the Julius Erving Award as Division I's top small forward. Martin was a Second Team All-Big East selection as a junior. The National Association of Basketball Coaches named Martin to the All‐District 5 Second Team on March 22. After the season, Martin undertook an internship with the TV station WTHR-13, working in video production and editing. He did not enter the NBA draft, since he wants to improve his mobility, and he is cooking his own food as a means of controlling his diet.

=== Senior season (2017–2018) ===
In an 81–69 win over Utah on December 5, Martin scored 29 points. On December 27, he had 27 points, including a game-winning layup with 2.9 seconds remaining in double overtime, to beat Georgetown 91–89. Martin scored 23 points to help defeat top-ranked Villanova 101–93 on December 30. He had a career-high 37 points in a 94–83 win over Marquette on January 12, 2018.

As a senior, Martin averaged 21.2 points and 6.3 rebounds per game. He was named to the First-team All-Big East. Martin scored 27 points in the first-round NCAA tournament matchup versus Arkansas and surpassed the 2,000-point threshold. He had 29 points in the 76–73 loss to Purdue in the Round of 32. Martin was a finalist for the Julius Erving Award as the nation's top small forward. He finished his career at Butler with 2,047 points, the second highest in school history.

== Professional career ==
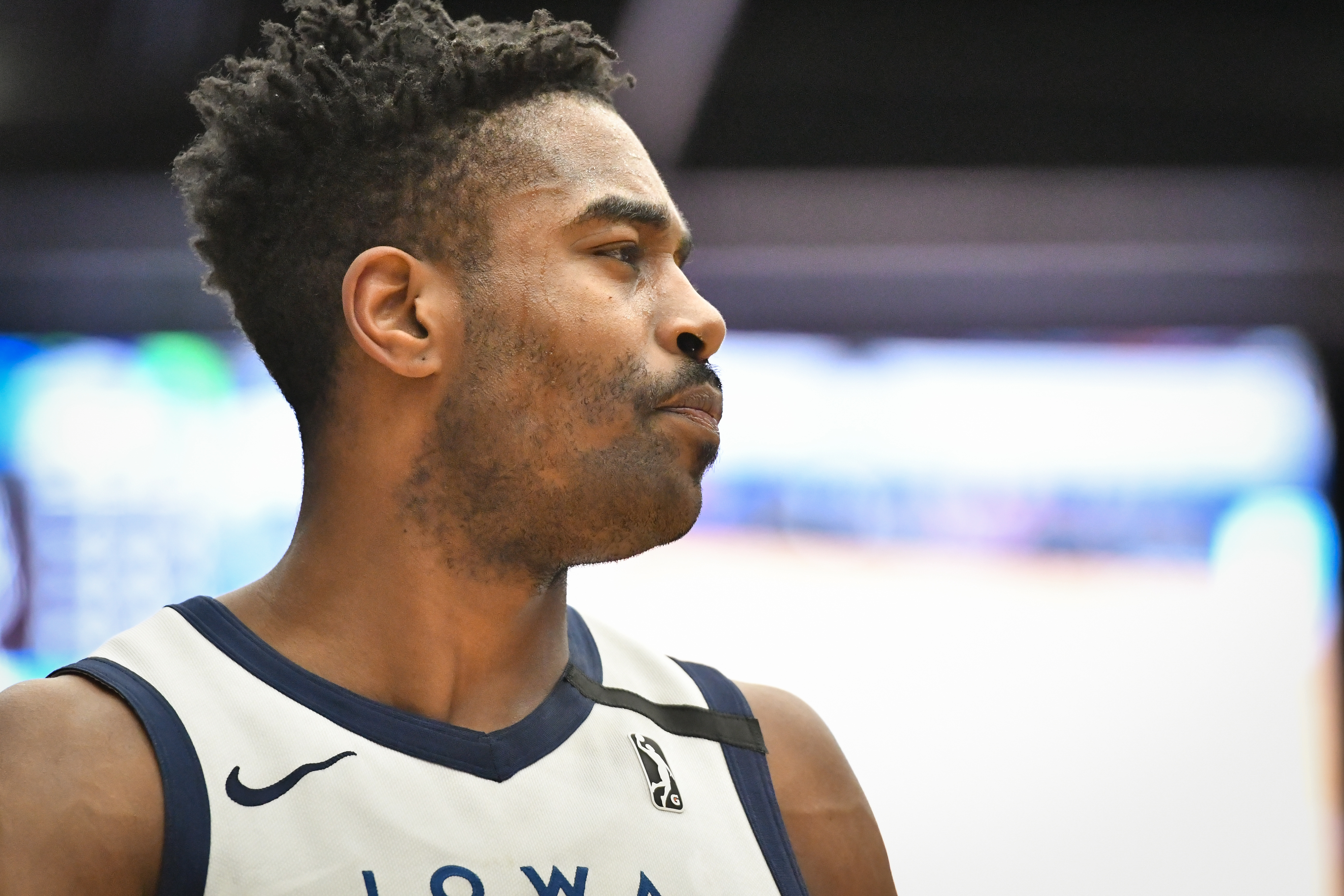
Martin in 2020

=== Riesen Ludwigsburg (2018–2019) ===
Prior to the 2018 NBA draft, Martin worked out for 12 NBA teams. After going undrafted, he signed a Summer League deal with the Utah Jazz. On July 31, 2018, Martin signed with MHP Riesen Ludwigsburg of the Basketball Bundesliga. Martin averaged 13.7 points and 4.4 rebounds per game in 27 games in Germany.

=== Minnesota Timberwolves (2019–2020) ===
Martin joined the Minnesota Timberwolves for the 2019 NBA Summer League, and after impressing for the team, he signed a two-way contract with the Timberwolves. He made his NBA debut on October 15 but was inactive in the next nine games. Martin scored 14 points and six rebounds in a 112–102 win over the Utah Jazz on November 18. He scored a then-career-high 17 points and 6 rebounds in a 94–88 loss to the Cleveland Cavaliers on December 28. Less than a week later, Martin had 12 points and eight rebounds on January 2, 2020, in a 99–84 win over the Golden State Warriors. In the G League, Martin posted 39 points for the Iowa Wolves in a 163–143 loss to the Stockton Kings on January 11. Martin was called up to Minnesota and had 12 points and five rebounds on February 3 in a 113–109 loss to the Sacramento Kings while filling in for the injured Allen Crabbe. On February 23, Martin scored a career-high 21 points along with 4 rebounds in a 128–116 loss to the Denver Nuggets.

=== Indiana Pacers (2020–2022) ===
On November 26, 2020, Martin signed with the Indiana Pacers on a two-year contract. He scored a then-season-high 11 points off the bench in 104–93 loss against the Sacramento Kings on May 5, 2021. On May 10, 2021, Martin scored a new career high of 25 points against the Cleveland Cavaliers.

On January 6, 2022, Martin was waived by the Pacers.

=== Boston Celtics (2022) ===
On February 23, 2022, Martin signed a 10-day contract with the Boston Celtics. He signed a second 10-day contract on March 5.

=== Grand Rapids Gold (2022) ===
On March 18, 2022, Martin was acquired via available player pool by the Grand Rapids Gold. On March 25, he was waived.

=== Birmingham Squadron (2022–2023) ===
On November 4, 2022, Martin was named to the opening-night roster for the Birmingham Squadron.

=== Pınar Karşıyaka (2023–2024) ===
On June 28, 2023, Martin signed with Pınar Karşıyaka of the Basketbol Süper Ligi.

=== Beşiktaş (2024–2025) ===
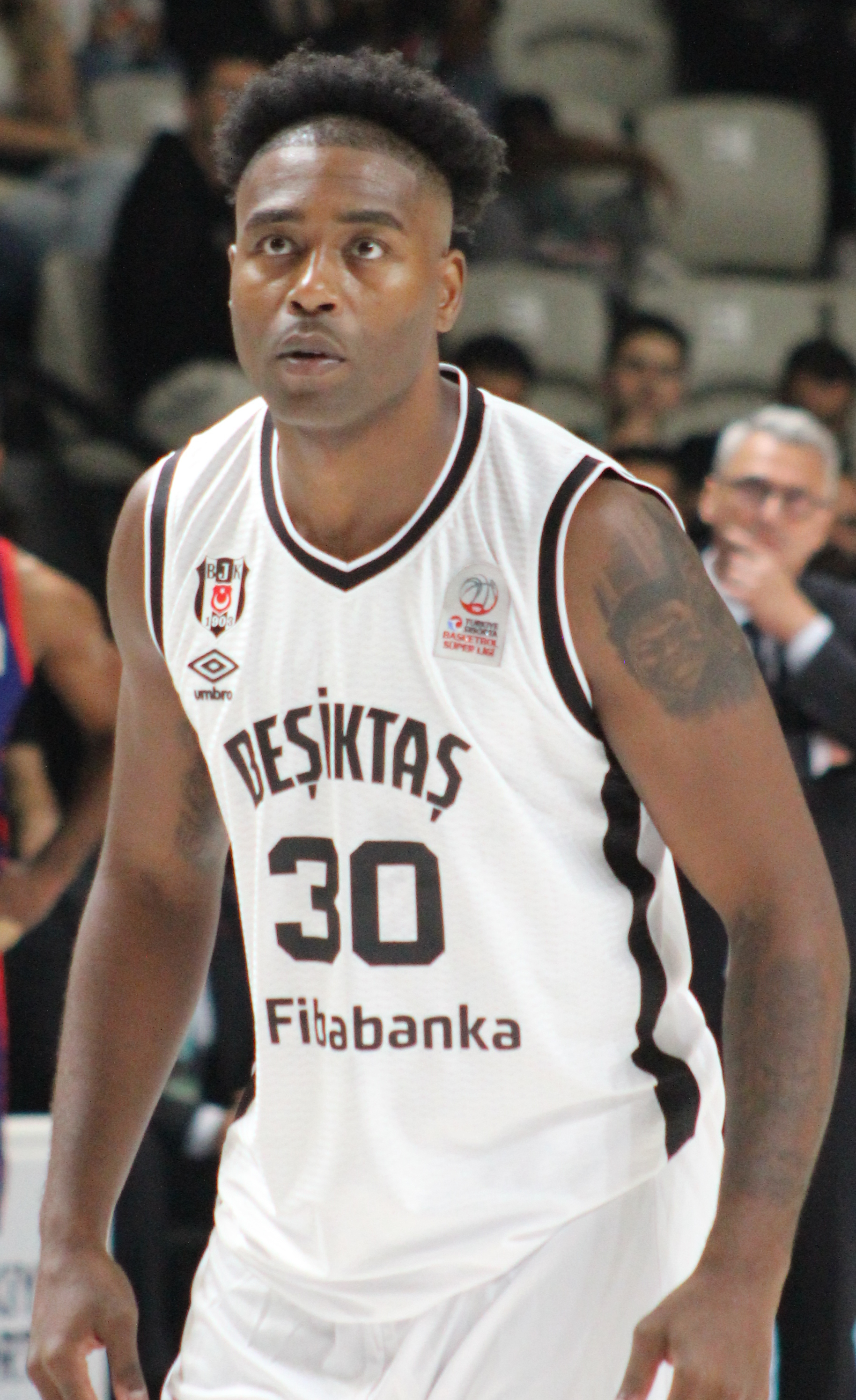
Martin with Beşiktaş in 2024

On June 27, 2024, Martin signed with Beşiktaş of the Basketbol Süper Ligi (BSL).

=== UCAM Murcia (2026) ===
In January 2026, Martin signed for UCAM Murcia of the Liga ACB and Europe Cup.

=== Illawarra Hawks (2026–present) ===
On August 7, 2026, Martin signed with the Illawarra Hawks of the Australian National Basketball League (NBL) for the 2026–27 season.

== Career statistics ==
Legend
GP	Games played	GS	Games started	MPG	Minutes per game
FG%	Field goal percentage	3P%	3-point field goal percentage	FT%	Free throw percentage
RPG	Rebounds per game	APG	Assists per game	SPG	Steals per game
BPG	Blocks per game	PPG	Points per game	**Bold**	Career high

=== NBA ===
==== Regular season ====
Year	Team	GP	GS	MPG	FG%	3P%	FT%	RPG	APG	SPG	BPG	PPG
2019–20	Minnesota	31	**4**	16.0	.392	.260	**.968**	**3.1**	.7	.2	**.3**	**6.4**
2020–21	Indiana	**35**	0	9.2	**.449**	**.400**	.900	2.2	.5	.3	**.3**	4.5
2021–22	Indiana	27	1	**16.4**	.417	.297	.692	2.0	**.8**	**.5**	**.3**	6.3
2021–22	Boston	3	0	1.9	.000	.000	–	.7	.0	.0	.0	.0
Career		96	5	13.2	.414	.307	.889	2.4	.6	.3	.3	5.5

=== College ===
Year	Team	GP	GS	MPG	FG%	3P%	FT%	RPG	APG	SPG	BPG	PPG
2014–15	Butler	34	0	14.6	.412	.247	.700	2.1	.4	.1	.2	7.1
2015–16	Butler	33	14	28.3	**.447**	**.377**	.761	**6.8**	.1	**.8**	**.5**	15.7
2016–17	Butler	34	22	28.7	.428	.348	.784	5.8	1.2	.7	.4	16.0
2017–18	Butler	**35**	**35**	**35.7**	**.447**	.364	**.844**	6.3	**2.0**	.7	**.5**	**21.2**
Career		136	71	26.9	.437	.348	.786	5.2	1.2	.6	.4	15.1
