= Kameron Woods =

American basketball coach

Oklahoma City Thunder
- Title: Assistant Coach
- League: NBA

Personal information
- Born: April 22, 1993 (age 33) Louisville, Kentucky, U.S.
- Listed height: 6 ft 9 in (2.06 m)
- Listed weight: 200 lb (91 kg)

Career information
- High school: Eastern (Louisville, Kentucky)
- College: Butler (2011–2015)
- NBA draft: 2015: undrafted
- Playing career: 2015–2017
- Position: Forward
- Coaching career: 2018–present

Career history

Playing
- 2015–2017: Oklahoma City Blue

Coaching
- 2018–2020: Oklahoma City Blue (assistant)
- 2020–2022: Oklahoma City Thunder (assistant)
- 2022–2025: Oklahoma City Blue
- 2025–Present: Oklahoma City Thunder (assistant)

Career highlights
- As head coach: NBA G League champion (2024)

Kameron Woods (born April 22, 1993) is an American professional basketball coach who is an assistant coach for the Oklahoma City Thunder of the National Basketball Association. He played college basketball for the Butler Bulldogs. He spent two seasons playing professional basketball for the Oklahoma City Blue before transitioning into a coaching position with the Blue and the Thunder.

== College career ==
Woods spent four seasons as a member of the Butler Bulldogs. In his first collegiate game, he came off the bench and recorded five points against the Louisville Cardinals. As a freshman, he averaged 4.2 points and 4.8 rebounds per game. As a junior, he became a starter and led Butler and the Big East in rebounding. On January 9, 2014, Woods put up 17 points and 14 rebounds in a 94–99 loss to the DePaul Blue Demons. At the end of his collegiate career, Woods left Butler as the leader in blocked shots for four straight seasons and second all-time leading rebounder at Butler.

== Professional career ==
=== Oklahoma City Blue (2015–2017) ===
After going undrafted in the 2015 NBA draft, Woods joined the Oklahoma City Blue for the 2015–16 NBA D League season. When Woods started his D League career, he told himself he would play for two seasons and re-evaluate how close he was to the NBA.

I don’t want to be somebody who plays so long that they pass up on opportunities because they’re chasing something, The NBA is so much younger. Windows for guys to make it are shorter because there’s 19-year-olds that are getting drafted all the time.

— Kameron Woods

In his first season with the Blue, he averaged 4.7 points, 5.2 rebounds in 49 appearances which included an 11-point, 15 rebound performance in a 90–94 loss to the South Bay Lakers. Woods joined the Oklahoma City Thunder for the 2016 NBA Summer League. In his summer league stint, Woods appeared in four games averaging 12 minutes. In his second season, he averaged a new career high in games started and minutes while averaging 4.5 points, 4.5 rebounds, and 1.5 assists. Following the season, Woods did not return to the Blue for a third season and instead moved to Atlanta and becoming an IT recruiter.

== Coaching career ==
In 2018, Woods returned to the Oklahoma City Blue as an assistant coach under head coach Mark Daigneault for the 2018–19 season. When Daigneault was promoted to the Thunder as an assistant coach, Woods was retained by incoming head coach Grant Gibbs for his second season. Woods was promoted to the Thunder as a player development coach for the 2020–21 season under Daigneault's first year as head coach. Despite the Thunder being one of the youngest teams during the 2021–22 season, the Thunder finished top-ten in defensive rating due to Woods's credit. Woods received praise from Mark Daigneault and players on the roster.

=== Oklahoma City Blue (2022–present) ===
On September 23, 2022, the Thunder named Woods the new head coach of the Oklahoma City Blue following Grant Gibbs's promotion to the Thunder coaching staff. Woods previously served as the head coach for the Thunder in the 2022 NBA Summer League in Salt Lake City and Las Vegas leading Oklahoma City to a 5–3 record. On November 4, 2022, the Blue opened up their season against the G League Ignite that saw the Blue winning 134–125, after trailing by 28 points to give Woods's his first career win. In his first season with the Blue, the Blue finished with a 13–19 record and finished top-ten in defensive rating, however the team missed the playoffs for the third consecutive season.

In his second season, Woods led the Blue back to the playoffs following a 21–13 record, their best record since the 2018–19 season. After a 2–9 start following the Winter Showcase, the Blue finished 3rd in the west, clinching their first playoff appearance since 2019. In the playoffs, the Blue defeated Rio Grande Valley Vipers at home and Sioux Falls Skyforce and top-seeded Stockton Kings on the road to make their finals since the 2009–10, when the team was known as the Tulsa 66ers. In the finals, the Blue defeated Maine Celtics 2–1 on the road following Ousmane Dieng's 25 points. With the win, Woods gave the Blue their first championship as the Oklahoma City Blue, their third overall as a franchise.

== Career statistics ==
Legend
GP	Games played	GS	Games started	MPG	Minutes per game
FG%	Field goal percentage	3P%	3-point field goal percentage	FT%	Free throw percentage
RPG	Rebounds per game	APG	Assists per game	SPG	Steals per game
BPG	Blocks per game	PPG	Points per game	**Bold**	Career high

=== College ===
Year	Team	GP	GS	MPG	FG%	3P%	FT%	RPG	APG	SPG	BPG	PPG
2011–12	Butler	**36**	5	17.6	.370	.180	.605	4.8	.6	.4	**1.1**	4.2
2012–13	Butler	**36**	0	17.0	**.547**	**.250**	.654	4.9	.8	.6	.7	4.5
2013–14	Butler	30	30	**33.4**	.448	—	.657	9.0	**2.0**	.9	1.0	7.5
2014–15	Butler	34	**34**	31.3	.506	—	**.659**	**9.9**	1.1	**1.2**	.9	**7.8**
Career		136	69	24.4	.464	.185	.650	7.2	1.1	.8	.9	5.9

=== NBA G League ===
Year	Team	GP	GS	MPG	FG%	3P%	FT%	RPG	APG	SPG	BPG	PPG
2015–16	Oklahoma City	49	14	21.8	**.480**	**.383**	**.679**	**5.2**	.9	.5	**.7**	**4.7**
2016–17	Oklahoma City	**50**	**29**	**25.5**	.401	.235	.640	4.5	**1.5**	**.7**	.5	4.5
Career		99	43	23.7	.436	.298	.660	4.9	1.2	.6	.6	4.6

== Coaching record ==
Legend
Regular season	G	Games coached	W	Games won	L	Games lost	W–L %	Win–loss %
Playoffs	PG	Playoff games	PW	Playoff wins	PL	Playoff losses	PW–L %	Playoff win–loss %

=== Regular season ===
Team	Year	G	W	L	W–L%	Finish	PG	PW	PL	PW–L%	Result
Oklahoma City	2022–23	32	13	19	.406	10th in West	—	—	—	—	Missed playoffs
Oklahoma City	2023–24	34	21	13	.618	3rd in West	6	5	1	.857	Won Championship
Oklahoma City	2024–25	34	18	16	.529	7th in West	—	—	—	—	Missed playoffs
Career		100	52	48	.520		6	5	1	.857	
