= Indiana All-Americans =

American basketball team

- League: Hoosier Hardwood Association; 2021; The Basketball League; 2022–present
- Founded: 2020
- History: New Castle Knighthawks; 2021; Indiana All-Americans; 2022–present
- Location: New Castle, Indiana
- Team colors
- Head coach: John Benson
- Ownership: Kent Benson, Bob Petty

The Indiana All-Americans are a basketball team in New Castle, Indiana, and members of The Basketball League (TBL).

== History ==
The New Castle NightHawks were a part of the Hoosier Hardwood Basketball Association, a league headed by former Indiana University great Kent Benson for the 2021 season.

On November 10, 2021 The Basketball League announced the Henry County All-Americans for the 2022 season.

The team was renamed as the Indiana All-Americans whose ownership includes former Indiana University great Kent Benson. It was also announced that Kellen Dunham signed up to play for the team. part of The Basketball League for the 2022 season.

== Current roster ==
Indiana All-Americans roster
Players
Coaches

Pos.	No.	Nat.	Name	Ht.	Wt.	Age
F	--	(United States)	Bentley, Trevon	6 ft 6 in (1.98 m)	220 lb (100 kg)	31 – 9 April 1995
G	--	(United States)	Dunham, Kellen	6 ft 4 in (1.93 m)	205 lb (93 kg)	33 – 18 January 1993
F	--	(United States)	Edmondson, Isaac	6 ft 5 in (1.96 m)	195 lb (88 kg)
PG	--	(United States)	Jackson, Lewis	5 ft 10 in (1.78 m)	165 lb (75 kg)	37 – 20 September 1989
G	--	(United States)	Johnson, Taishaun	6 ft 0 in (1.83 m)	176 lb (80 kg)	32 – 28 July 1994
F	--	(United States)	Kelly, Nijay	6 ft 2 in (1.88 m)
SG	--	(United States)	Larson, Aaron	6 ft 7 in (2.01 m)	205 lb (93 kg)	33 – 1 January 1993
G	--	(United States)	Leavell, Tim	6 ft 1 in (1.85 m)	165 lb (75 kg)
F	--	(United States)	Little, Emmanuel	6 ft 6 in (1.98 m)	200 lb (91 kg)
F	--	(United States)	Morse, Marquez	6 ft 6 in (1.98 m)	200 lb (91 kg)
G/F	--	(United States)	Sellers, Sean	6 ft 6 in (1.98 m)	195 lb (88 kg)	31 – 9 April 1995
G/F	--	(United States)	Hinton, Logan	6 ft 5 in (1.96 m)	195 lb (88 kg)	24 – 20 November 2001

Head coach

- (United States) John Benson

Legend

- (C) Team captain
- Injured
