= Lewis Jackson (basketball, born 1989) =

American basketball player

Indiana All-Americans
- Position: Point guard

Personal information
- Born: September 20, 1989 (age 37) Decatur, Illinois
- Listed height: 5 ft 10 in (1.78 m)
- Listed weight: 165 lb (75 kg)

Career information
- High school: Eisenhower (Decatur, Illinois)
- College: Purdue (2008–2012)
- NBA draft: 2012: undrafted
- Playing career: 2012–present

Career history
- 2012–2013: BC Šiauliai
- 2013–2014: Erie BayHawks
- 2014: Westchester Knicks
- 2014–2015: Idaho Stampede
- 2015–2016: Orangeville A's
- 2016: Erie BayHawks
- 2016: Indiana All-Americans

Career highlights
- Big Ten All-Freshman Team (2009)

Lewis Jackson IV (born September 20, 1989) is an American professional basketball player who plays for the Indiana All-Americans. Previously he played for the Erie BayHawks of the NBA Development League. He played college basketball at Purdue University. In his junior season, Jackson led the Boilermakers with four assists per game and shooting 50.3 percent from the floor. As Purdue's primary point guard, he was named Honorable Mention All-Big Ten as well as a Bob Cousy Award candidate in 2011 and 2012.

== High school career ==
Jackson attended Eisenhower High School, located in Decatur, Illinois, where he played basketball under head coach, Jeremy Moore. During his senior season, Lewis averaged 21.7 points and 10 assists a game, while being named Illinois' 2008 Big School Player of the Year by MidStateHoops.com., while finishing third for Illinois' Mr. Basketball and earning area Player of the Year honors. He was also a member of Indiana's Elite AAU squad.

== College career ==
=== Purdue ===
==== 2008–09 ====
After graduating high school, Jackson attended Purdue University to play under head coach, Matt Painter, along with All-Conference players in E'Twaun Moore, Robbie Hummel, and JaJuan Johnson. In his freshman season, Jackson used his speed and ball handling skills to become the team's starting point guard, where he started in 30 of the 36 games in which he appeared, while setting a school freshman record with most games played in a season. His 30 starts were two less than Russell Cross's 32 starts in 1981. Leading Purdue in assists with 3.4 a game, his 118 on the season is second most by a freshman behind Bruce Parkinson's 147 mark in 1973. On January 27, 2009, Lewis ran into a hard pick made by Wisconsin's Joe Crabbenhoft early in the game, where he sustained a concussion, forcing him to sit out a game. He scored in double figures seven times (3–4), while averaging 5.9 points per game and handing off 3.4 assists a game to lead the Boilers on the season. After leading the boilers to an 11–7 record in Big Ten play and to a 27–10 overall record and a Sweet Sixteen appearance, Lewis was named to the Big Ten All-Freshman Team, along with the likes of future NBA player Byron Mullens.

==== 2009–10 ====
In the spring of 2009, Jackson was involved in a traffic stop in his hometown of Decatur, Illinois, resulting in community service and missing the two exhibition games, as well as the season opener. After sitting out the three designated games for his suspension, Lewis injured his foot during practice, which left him sidelined, wearing a foot cast after he received surgery. On January 28, 2010, Lewis appeared in his first game of the season in a home meeting against Wisconsin. As the team's primary point guard, he helped lead AP-ranked #6 Purdue to a 14–4 conference record (10–1 in games which he appeared) and onto a Big Ten title, the program's first in fourteen years. On March 3, 2010, Lewis had a huge performance with 9 points, 5 assists, and 3 rebounds in a win against in-state rivals, Indiana. With nine games recording four or more assists on the season, including a nine assist performance against Siena in the First Round of the NCAA tournament, where he also pulled down six rebounds and scored eight points. He led Purdue with an average of 3.5 assists per game. Jackson helped Purdue to consecutive Sweet Sixteen appearances and onto a 29–6 record.

==== 2010–11 ====
At full health entering the 2011 season, Jackson averaged eight points, while leading Purdue with four assists and shooting 50.3 percent from the floor as a junior. He averaged 3.2 rebounds and shot 71.6 at the line, as well. He grabbed season highs of six rebounds twice against Valparaiso and North Florida, scored 11 points against Valparaiso, and tying a career-high with nine assists against Austin Peay. In a game against IPFW, Jackson had eight assists and eight points with no turnovers. He scored a then-career high 17 points in a road game at Penn State. On January 22, Jackson scored a new career high 19 points against Michigan State. Jackson scored in double figures eleven times. On December 20, Jackson was named a Bob Cousy Award candidate. Becoming more of a needed scoring option for the Boilers, he averaged 10.2 points a game in conference play (14–4) and helped lead the Boilers to a 2nd-place finish. Jackson was named Honorable Mention All-Big Ten. He helped Purdue to the Third Round of the NCAA tournament, finishing with a 25–8 record.

==== 2011–12 ====
Jackson joined fellow seniors Robbie Hummel and Ryne Smith as tri-captains for the 2012 Purdue basketball team. Beginning the season with a troubling foot, he managed to average 12.5 points and four assists in his first four outings of the season (4–0). On November 18, 2011, against Temple, Lewis recorded a career high 26 points, shooting 8–14 from the floor and making 10 of 11 at the free throw line. Two days later, Jackson tallied a career high 9 rebounds in a loss to #15 ranked Alabama. On December 19, Jackson was named a candidate for the Bob Cousy Award for the second year in a row. Leading Purdue to a 20–11 record, Jackson averaged 10.4 points (2nd on team), 4.2 assists (1st), 1.3 steals (1st), and 3.2 rebounds (3rd), while shooting 72.8 percent at the line. In early December, Lewis began battling foot pains and back strains, forcing him to miss a majority of practice time. On the season, he's scored in double figures 16 times, which includes two 20+ point performances (2–0). Jackson held one of the best assist to turnover ratios in the nation, leading the Big Ten, while having the most career assists (451) amongst active Big Ten players, just ahead of Wisconsin's Jordan Taylor. At the culmination of the regular season, Jackson, along with teammate DJ Byrd, was named Honorable Mention All-Big Ten, a repeat for Jackson. On March 9, in the quarterfinals of the Big Ten Tournament, in a loss to #7 Ohio State, Jackson dished a career high 10 assists, while recording his first double-double, scoring 10 points. In his last season at Purdue, Jackson led the Boilers to the third round of the NCAA Tournament, losing to Kansas. He led them to a 22–13 overall record on the season. During his college career, Purdue went 104–37 overall, making him the winningest starting point guard in the program's history.

== Professional career ==
Jackson went undrafted in the 2012 NBA draft. In August 2012, he signed with BC Šiauliai of Lithuania for the 2012–13 season.

On November 1, 2013, Jackson was selected in the fifth round of the 2013 NBA D-League draft by the Sioux Falls Skyforce. On November 21, he was waived by the Skyforce. On December 10, 2013, he was acquired by the Erie BayHawks. In 36 games for the BayHawks, he averaged 11.8 points, 4.5 rebounds, 8.9 assists and 1.1 steals per game.

On November 21, 2014, Jackson was acquired by the Westchester Knicks. On December 4, 2014, he was traded to the Idaho Stampede in exchange for a 2015 second round draft pick. On October 31, 2016, Jackson was re-acquired by the Erie BayHawks. In six games, he averaged 5.5 points, 2.3 rebounds and 2.5 assists in 19 minutes. On December 23, he was traded to the Delaware 87ers in exchange for a fifth-round pick. On February 1, he was waived by the 87ers; he did not play a single game for the team during his tenure.
