= Kethan Savage =

American basketball player (born 1993)

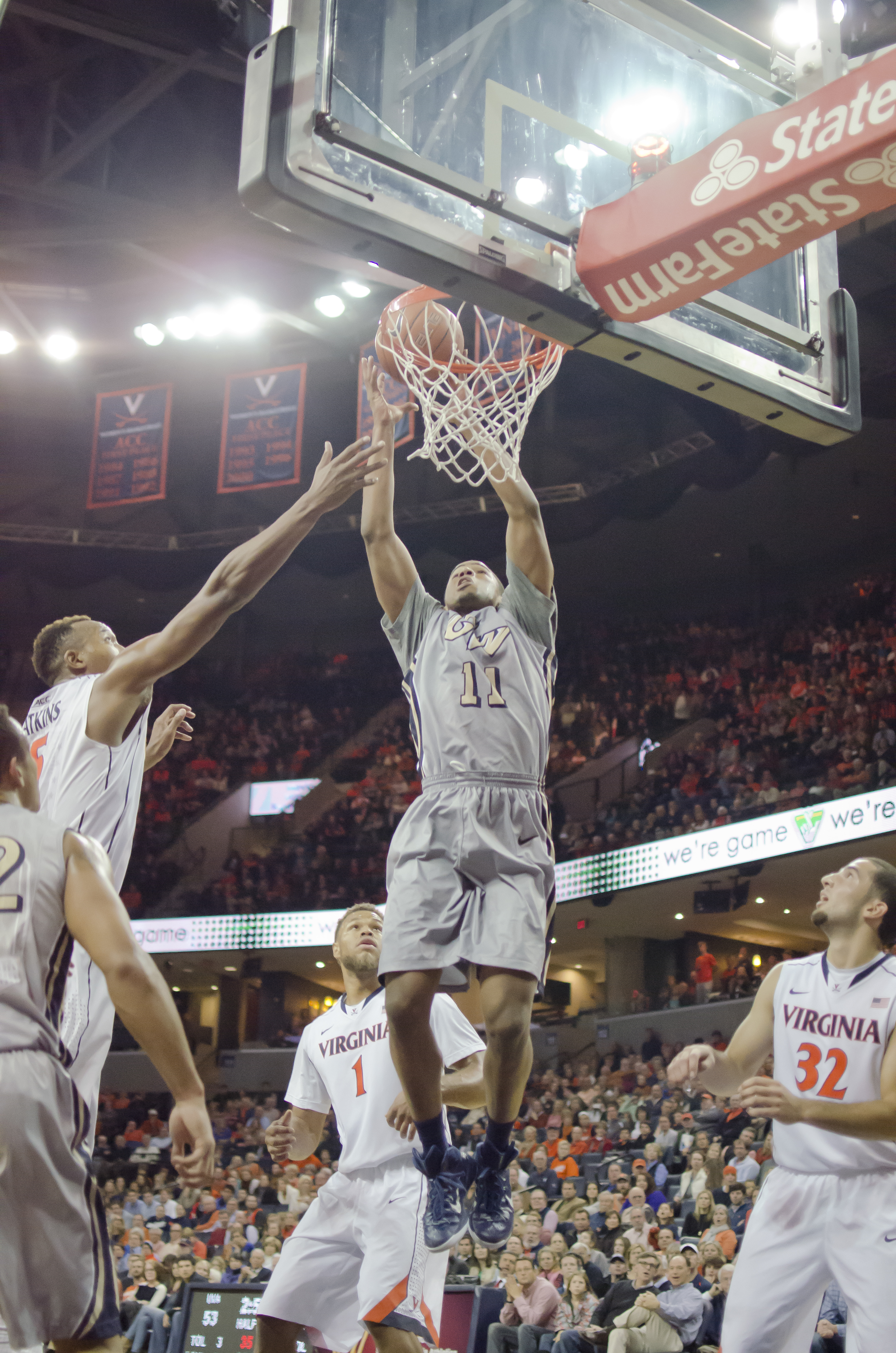
- Kethan Savage dunking

Personal information
- Born: September 4, 1993 (age 33) Fairfax, Virginia
- Listed height: 6 ft 3 in (1.91 m)
- Listed weight: 205 lb (93 kg)

Career information
- High school: Episcopal (Alexandria, Virginia)
- College: George Washington (2012–2015); Butler (2016–2017)
- NBA draft: 2017: undrafted
- Playing career: 2017–2022
- Position: Point guard

Career history
- 2017–2018: Raptors 905
- 2019: Oklahoma City Blue
- 2019: Westchester Knicks
- 2019: Oklahoma City Blue
- 2021: Guelph Nighthawks
- 2021–2022: Westchester Knicks

Kethan Savage (born September 4, 1993) is an American former professional basketball player. He played college basketball for George Washington and Butler.

== High school career ==
Savage attended Chantilly High School for two years before transferring to Episcopal High School in Alexandria, Virginia. Savage led Episcopal to its first league championship since 1998 as a junior by hitting the decisive three pointer. As a senior, he averaged 19.7 points, 5.8 rebounds and 4.2 assists per game. Savage led the team to a 24–4 record a place in Virginia's independent schools championship game.

== College career ==
With George Washington, Savage came off the bench to average 3.1 points per game as a freshman. He increased his scoring to 12.7 points per game as a sophomore but was injured late in the season and did not play in the 2014 NCAA tournament. As a junior, Savage averaged 11.7 points, 4.8 rebounds and 2.7 assists per game. After the season he announced he was transferring to Butler and sat out the year as a redshirt. He had off-season shoulder surgery and missed Butler's first four games due to pneumonia. He played in his first NCAA Tournament in 2017 although he was limited by a sore Achilles tendon. In his senior season, Savage averaged 8.0 points, 2.7 rebounds, and 1.5 assists per game while shooting 44.3 percent from the floor and 29.2 percent from behind the arc.

== Professional career ==
Savage was selected with the 26th pick in the first round of the 2017 NBA G League Draft by the Raptors 905. He was the only draft pick by the Raptors 905 to actually make the team. Savage played two games for the Oklahoma City Blue in the 2018–19 season before being acquired by the Westchester Knicks. He subsequently played for the Blue. In 2021, Savagoe joined the Guelph Nighthawks of the Canadian Elite Basketball League and averaged nine points per game. In October 2021, he joined the Westchester Knicks after a successful tryout.
