= Rolf van Rijn =

Dutch basketball player

Personal information
- Born: 23 October 1972 (age 54) Roosendaal, Netherlands
- Listed height: 2.17 m (7 ft 1 in)

Career information
- College: Butler (1994–1998)
- Playing career: 1992–2001
- Position: Center

Career history
- 1992–1994: PSV Eindhoven
- 1998: Real Madrid
- 1998–1999: Mons-Hainaut
- 1999: Spirou Charleroi
- 1999–2000: BCM Gravelines
- 2000: Riviera Basket
- 2000–2001: Rotterdam

Rolf van Rijn (born 23 October 1972) is a Dutch retired basketball player. Van Rijn, 2.17 m (7 ft 1 in) tall, played as center for several teams over his career. In 1998, he was a member of Real Madrid. He also played for the Netherlands national basketball team.
