= Jon Rothstein =

American sports writer and reporter

- Education: Ithaca College
- Occupation: Sports reporter
- Employer(s): CBS Sports; FanDuel
- Known for: College Basketball; March Madness

Jon Rothstein is an American sports writer and reporter for CBS Sports. He covers men's college basketball and has been with CBS since 2010. He has also been a content creator with FanDuel since 2022.

== Early life ==
Rothstein grew up in Mahopac, New York. His mother, Andrea, was a special education teacher, and his father, Barry, was a guidance counselor. Rothstein credits his father with spurring his passion for college basketball.

He studied sports media at Ithaca College, and interned for YES Network while still in college. Ithaca has recently recognized Rothstein as a distinguished alumnus in sports.

== Career ==
In 2004, despite having no connections in the sports industry, Rothstein won a contest and was able to do some on-air reporting for ESPN Radio in New York City. He also made money cold-calling for a mortgage company, and eventually saved enough money to buy a once-weekly radio slot on a small New Rochelle radio station. He struggled to sell ads for the show, but eventually received a job offer at MSG Network in 2007. He moved to CBS Sports in 2010.

Rothstein is known for his networking skills and his pithy, unique tweeting style.
