= Jeff Rogers =

American soccer player (born 1964)

Personal information
- Date of birth: December 5, 1964 (age 61)
- Place of birth: Tucson, Arizona, U.S.
- Height: 5 ft 6 in (1.68 m)
- Positions: Forward; midfielder

College career
Years	Team	Apps	(Gls)
1983	San Diego State Aztecs		

Senior career*
Years	Team	Apps	(Gls)
1985–1986	Dallas Sidekicks (indoor)	15	(1)
1986–1987	Milwaukee Wave (indoor)	39	(13)
1989–1991	Atlanta Attack (indoor)	43	(27)
1990	Arizona Condors	32	(17)
1991	Salt Lake Sting	10	(1)
1992–1993	Colorado Foxes	17	(1)
1992–1993	Denver Thunder (indoor)	40	(43)
1994	Arizona Sandsharks (indoor)		
1994–1996	Kansas City Attack (indoor)	69	(56)

Managerial career
- 1994: Arizona Sandsharks (assistant)
- * Club domestic league appearances and goals

Jeff Rogers (born December 5, 1964) is an American retired soccer player. He began his professional career in the Major Indoor Soccer League before playing in the American Indoor Soccer League and its successor, the National Professional Soccer League, as well as the American Professional Soccer League and USISL.

In 1983, Rogers attended San Diego State University, playing one season for the Aztecs. On October 16, 1985, the Dallas Sidekicks of the Major Indoor Soccer League signed Rogers after spotting him in Phoenix, AZ while playing with an amateur team in an exhibition game against the Sidekicks. The Sidekicks released him on October 23, 1986. Rogers moved to Tampa Bay but was traded to the Milwaukee Wave of the American Indoor Soccer Association for one season. On December 21, 1989, Rogers signed with the Atlanta Attack.and was voted most improved player in the league in April 1990 In 1990, Rogers also turned to outdoor soccer when he joined the Arizona Condors of the American Professional Soccer League. He was named player of the week twice, and selected to the All League Second Team, finishing second in assists to Dominic Kinnear of the San Francisco Blackhawks. In 1991, he played for the Salt Lake Sting. In 1992 and 1993, he played for the Colorado Foxes winning back to back championships. During the 1992–93 indoor season, Rogers had his best statistical season, scoring forty-three goals in forty games for the Denver Thunder. In September 1993, Rogers was signed by the Kansas City Attack and suffered a season ending ACL tear 3 games into the season. In May 1994, he was named the assistant coach with the Arizona Sandsharks of the Continental Indoor Soccer League. In 1994, Rogers returned to the Attack and amassed 164 points (57 goals, 50 assists) in 59 games over the course of two seasons. In May 1995, Rogers played for the Albany Alleycats in the USISL and was named as a first team all-star, leading Albany in Goals, Assists, and Total Points. In June 1995, the Tampa Bay Terror selected Rogers in the NPSL Expansion Draft, then traded him to the Baltimore Spirit for Jon Parry. In October 1995, the Spirit sold Rogers' contract back to the Attack. In May 1996, Rogers and Lee Tschantret argued with officials during game six of the NPSL finals. This led to Rogers' receiving a three-game suspension and undisclosed fine. In June 1996, Rogers announced his retirement and subsequently returned to Tucson and co-founded the Tucson Soccer Academy in August 2000.
