= Billy Shepherd (basketball) =

American basketball player

Personal information
- Born: November 18, 1949 (age 76) Bedford, Indiana, U.S.
- Listed height: 5 ft 10 in (1.78 m)
- Listed weight: 160 lb (73 kg)

Career information
- High school: Carmel (Carmel, Indiana)
- College: Butler (1969–1972)
- NBA draft: 1972: undrafted
- Playing career: 1972–1975
- Position: Point guard
- Number: 21, 20, 6

Career history
- 1972–1973: Virginia Squires
- 1973–1974: San Diego Conquistadors
- 1974–1975: Memphis Sounds

Career highlights
- Fourth-team Parade All-American (1968); Indiana Mr. Basketball (1968)
- Stats at Basketball Reference

Bill L. Shepherd Jr. (born November 18, 1949) is an American former basketball player who played in the American Basketball Association (ABA).

A 5 ft 10 in (1.78 m) point guard born in Bedford, Indiana, Shepherd played at Carmel High School, where he was coached by his father, Bill Shepherd Sr. He scored 2,465 points in four years and was selected as Indiana's Mr. Basketball in 1968. He then played at Butler University, also his father's alma mater, from 1969 to 1972, and set school records for highest career scoring average (24.1 points per game) and highest scoring average in a season (27.8 points per game).

From 1972 to 1975, Shepherd played in the American Basketball Association as a member of the Virginia Squires, San Diego Conquistadors, and Memphis Sounds. He averaged 5.7 points per game in his professional career, and led the ABA in three-point field goal percentage (.420) during the 1974–75 season. Afterward, he worked as a scout for Marty Blake. Shepherd was inducted into the Indiana Basketball Hall of Fame in 1997.
