= Tyler Wideman =

American basketball player (born 1995)

Nuova Pallacanestro Vigevano 1955
- Position: Power forward / center
- League: Serie A2 (basketball)

Personal information
- Born: November 18, 1995 (age 30) Schererville, Indiana, U.S.
- Listed height: 6 ft 8 in (2.03 m)
- Listed weight: 240 lb (109 kg)

Career information
- High school: Lake Central (St. John, Indiana)
- College: Butler (2014–2018)
- NBA draft: 2018: undrafted
- Playing career: 2018–present

Career history
- 2018–2019: Cedevita
- 2019–2020: Maccabi Ra'anana
- 2020–2021: Soproni KC
- 2021–2023: A.S. Ramat HaSharon
- 2023–present: Nuova Pallacanestro Vigevano 1955
Medals
Representing the United States
Pan American Games
Bronze medal – third place	2019 Lima	National team

Tyler Wideman (born November 18, 1995) is an American professional basketball player for Nuova Pallacanestro Vigevano 1955 in Serie A2. He played college basketball at Butler University from 2014 to 2018 before playing professionally in Croatia, Israel, Hungary, and Italy.

== College career ==
As a senior at Butler Bulldogs in 2017–18 Wideman averaged 9.3 points and 5.1 rebounds in 20.5 minutes in 34 appearances. On December 27, 2017, he contributed 15 points and 8 rebounds in 91–89 win against Georgetown. On February 1, 2018, he had 23 points and 9 rebounds in a 92–72 win over Marquette.

== Professional career ==
On July 20, 2018, he signed his first professional contract with Croatian basketball club Cedevita Zagreb. In 18 games played for Cedevita, he averaged 7.6 points and 4.6 rebounds per game, while shooting 58 percent from the field.

On July 28, 2019, Wideman signed with Maccabi Ra'anana of the Israeli National League for the 2019–20 season. He averaged 16 points and 7 rebounds per game. On August 20, 2020, Wideman signed with Soproni KC of the Hungarian league. In 2021, he signed with A.S. Ramat HaSharon of the Israeli National League.

On July 21, 2023, Italian team Nuova Pallacanestro Vigevano 1955 announced that Wideman had signed a 1-year deal.

== National team career ==
In the summer of 2019, Wideman was a part of the United States National team who competed at the Pan American Games in Peru. The team won bronze.
