= O'Fallon Township High School =

Location
- 600 South Smiley Street; O'Fallon, Illinois 62269; United States
- 38.5867160°N 89.9017677°W

Information
- School type: Public
- Motto: "Excellence in Education for Every student Every day"
- Founded: 1901
- School district: 203
- Superintendent: Beth Shackelford
- Principal: Dan Howe
- Staff: 155.00 (FTE)
- Grades: 9-12
- Enrollment: 2,559 (2023–2024)
- Student to teacher ratio: 16.51
- Colors: Blue; Gold
- Athletics conference: Southwestern Conference
- Mascot: Panther
- Publication: Panther Beat
- Newspaper: The Prowler
- Yearbook: The Panther
- Website: www.oths.us

O'Fallon Township High School is a public secondary school in O'Fallon, Illinois.

As of 2023, it is the second largest public high school in Illinois by enrollment outside of the Chicago area (Belleville High School-East being the largest).

== History ==
OTHS Crest

As stated in the 1962 edition of The Panther, the symbology on O'Fallon Township High School's crest reflects the town's history of farming, industry, and coal mining. Today, the school's coat of arms/crest can be found in the Smiley Campus's 600 hallway on a bronze plaque gifted by the Class of 1961.

After a short tenure as an assistant principal, longtime teacher Rich Bickel became the principal in 2009, following the retirement of Steve Dirnbeck who served as the school's principal from 2003-2009.

== Team achievements ==
- The varsity baseball team earned the first team state trophy in school history by placing third in the IHSA State Tournament in 2006 and again in 2009.
- The varsity cheerleading team placed second at AmeriCheer's National Cheerleading Competition and at state in 2007, fourth at state in 2008, and second again in 2009.
- The boys' basketball team AA finished second at the 2007 State Basketball Tournament held in Peoria, Illinois at Bradley University, and in 4A it finished fourth in 2010.
- The Marching Panthers placed first with Best Visual and General Effect at the 2015 Bands of America Clarksville, TN Regional Championships; and placed 3rd at the 2017 Bands of America St. Louis Super Regional.
- The Marching Panthers placed 2nd at the 2023 Bands of America St. Louis Super Regional, winning Class 4A with best Visual Performance and tying best General Effect in their class. They also set their highest ever score at this competition, with a score of 90.075.
- The Winter Guard placed third at MCCGA Championships and 1st in state in 2009-2010.
- The 2010 Boys Cross Country team placed fifth in the 3A State meet, with a team average of 14:59 for 3 miles.
- The 2011 Boys Cross Country team placed second in the 3A state meet, O'Fallon's first Cross Country trophy.
- The 2012 Boys Cross Country team placed second in the 3A state meet.
- The 2011 Winter Guard placed first in Class A at the World Championships.
- The 2007-08 Scholar Bowl team went 37-4 and went to the IHSA class AA tournament for the first time in the school's history.

== Notable alumni ==
- Bob Cryder — NFL
- Bernie Fuchs — illustrator
- Conner Hicks — USMA Cadet
- Roosevelt Jones — NBA
- Tucker McCann — NFL
- Andrew Sanchez — UFC
- Gabby Windey — Denver Broncos cheerleader, winner of the 2021 Pop Warner Humanitarian Award, and reality television personality.
