= Roosevelt Jones =

American basketball player (1993-)

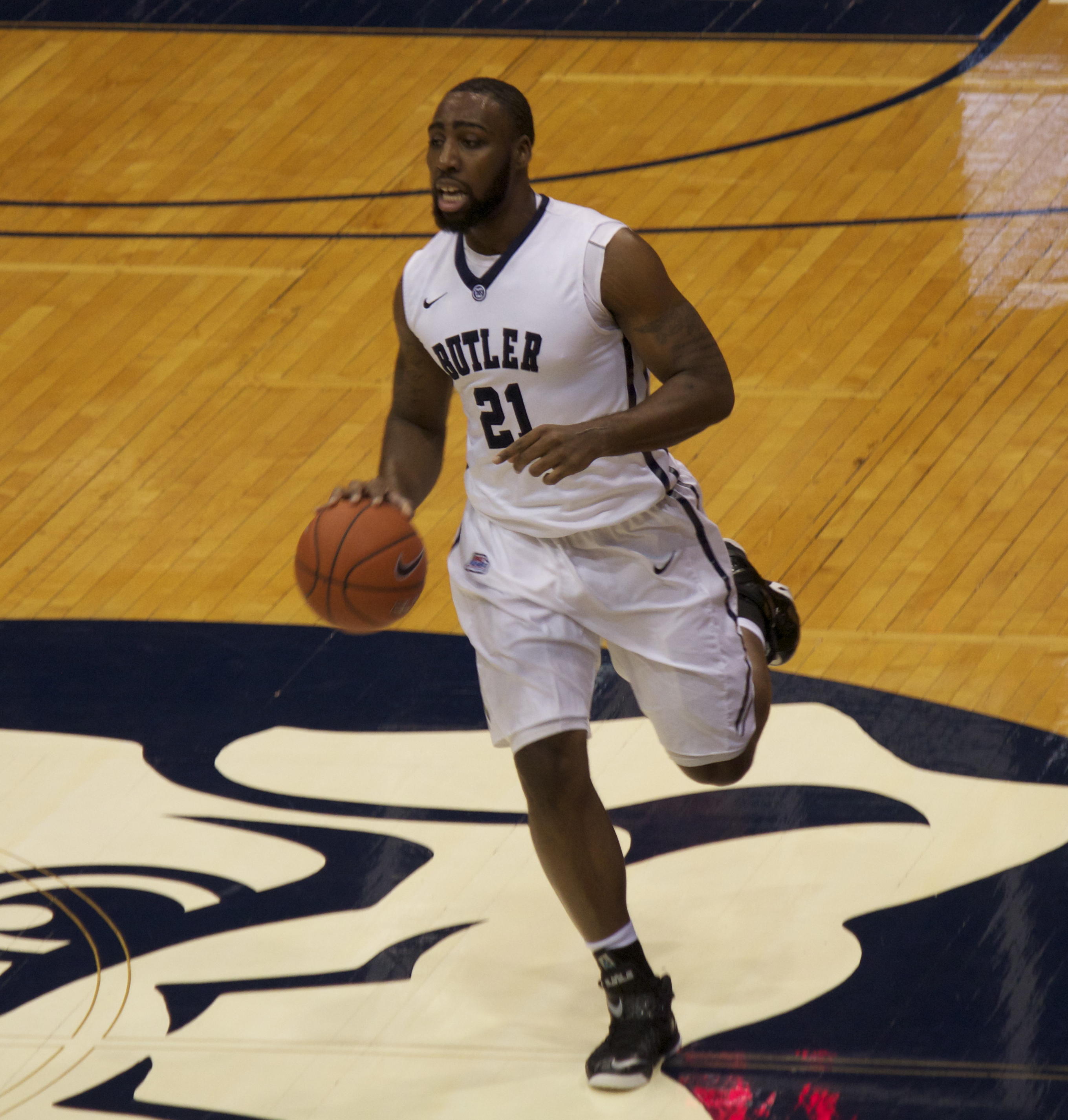

Personal information
- Born: January 25, 1993 (age 33) East St. Louis, Illinois, US
- Listed height: 6 ft 4 in (1.93 m)
- Listed weight: 225 lb (102 kg)

Career information
- High school: O'Fallon Township (O'Fallon, Illinois)
- College: Butler (2011–2016)
- NBA draft: 2016: undrafted
- Playing career: 2016–2018
- Position: Forward
- Number: 21, 12
- Coaching career: 2018–present

Career history

Playing
- 2016–2018: Canton Charge

Coaching
- 2018–2020: IU Kokomo (assistant)
- 2020–2022: Indianapolis (assistant)
- 2022–2023: Evansville (dir. basketball ops.)
- 2023–2025: Evansville (assistant)

Career highlights
- 2× Second-team All-Big East (2015, 2016)

Roosevelt Jones (born January 25, 1993) is an American basketball coach and former professional basketball player. He played college basketball for Butler. At O'Fallon Township High School, he led the team to the semifinals of Illinois' 2010 Class 4A state tournament. He was a three-star recruit ranked in the 2011 Rivals.com 150 and committed to playing for Butler. As a sophomore at Butler, Jones made a buzzer-beating shot to defeat Gonzaga and averaged 10.1. points per game. He missed the following season after tearing ligaments in his left wrist during a preseason trip to Australia. As a redshirt junior, Jones averaged 12.7 points per game and was named to the Second-team All-Big East. He repeated as second-team All-Big East as a senior, averaged 13.8 points per game, and had a rare triple-double in a February 6, 2016 win over St. John's. After his senior season, Jones was drafted by the Canton Charge of the NBA D-League and had 20 rebounds in a game, the fifth most in D-League (now G League) history. He announced his retirement from competitive basketball in August 2017 but returned to the game in January 2018.

== Early life ==
Jones was born and raised in East St. Louis, Illinois, the son of Robert Jones Jr. and Vickie (Jones) Franklin. He has two older siblings, Robert Jones III and Tonia (Jones) Wiggins, and his brother and father are Baptist ministers. He moved to O'Fallon, Illinois as a child, and grew up playing a number of sports, including tennis and football. "Roosevelt was probably the clumsiest child that we had because he was very, very awkward," his father said. "But when a basketball entered his hands, that all changed." Jones developed his unorthodox playing style after his father enrolled him in a church league as a child and he could not get his shot off against older players. In eighth grade, he broke his wrist, permanently affecting his shot.

Jones attended O'Fallon Township High School, where he was coached by Rick Gibson. He took to weightlifting to fill out his "pencil-thin" frame and was the sophomore leader on a 14–15 team. As a junior he led O'Fallon to the semifinals of Illinois' 2010 Class 4A state tournament. Jones had 22 points and 19 rebounds in that game, a 48–42 loss to Simeon Career Academy which featured Jabari Parker. He averaged 19.3 points and 12.1 rebounds per game that year. In his senior season, Jones averaged 17.2 points, 10.4 rebounds, 4.5 assists, 2.9 steals and 1.1 blocked shots per game. He led O'Fallon to a 20–7 record and a win in the Southwestern Conference championship while being named to the All-Metro First Team. He was a three-star recruit ranked in the 2011 Rivals 150th and the 33rd-best freshman small forward in his class. Assistant coach Terry Johnson recruited Jones to Butler, but he did not notice Jones's poor shooting style due to his athleticism. He received recruiting interest from Purdue, Iowa, Oklahoma State and Kansas, but stuck with Butler.

College recruiting
| Name | Hometown | School | Height | Weight | Commit date |
|---|---|---|---|---|---|
| Roosevelt Jones; SF | O'Fallon, IL | O'Fallon Township HS | 6 ft 4 in (1.93 m) | 210 lb (95 kg) | Apr 29, 2010 |
| Roosevelt Jones; SF | Recruit ratings: Scout: Rivals: ESPN: | | | | |

== College career ==
In a win against Milwaukee on March 2, 2012, Jones tallied a season-high 17 points as well as 10 rebounds. He averaged 7.8 points and a team-high 6.0 rebounds per game as a freshman. Jones was named to the Horizon League all-newcomer team. He had a memorable game on January 3, 2013, scoring a season-high 24 points in Butler's eighth straight win over Penn. On January 22, he was named Oscar Robertson National Player of the Week after contributing 20 points, five rebounds, four assists, one block and one steal in a 64–63 upset over No. 8 Gonzaga for College GameDay in a game in which leading scorer Rotnei Clarke was sidelined. Jones stole the ball at midcourt with ten seconds to go and hit a ten-foot floater at the buzzer for the win. Jones was named to the Atlantic 10 All-Defensive Team as a sophomore. He averaged 10.1 points and 5.6 rebounds per game and led the team in assists, with 3.5 per game on a 27–9 team.

On August 16, it was announced that Jones tore ligaments in his left wrist during a preseason trip to Australia and needed to undergo surgery that would force him to miss the entire 2013–14 season. He travelled with the team most of the year but missed the conference tournament as his Butler teammates struggled to a 14–17 season. In June, he was medically cleared to practice again. Coming into his redshirt junior year, Jones was a preseason All-Big East Honorable Mention. On January 17, 2015, Jones scored a career-high 28 points in a 61–59 loss to Georgetown. He had 18 points, grabbed six rebounds and added six assists in a 58–56 win over Creighton on February 16, and hit the game-winning layup with 1.9 seconds remaining. Jones had 23 points in Butler's 67–64 loss to Notre Dame in the NCAA tournament despite playing with a strained knee. As a junior, he averaged 12.7 points, 5.2 rebounds and 3.7 assists per game. He was named to the All-Big East Second Team. Jones became known for his defense and his passing vision and rarely shooting outside 15 feet (4.6 m).

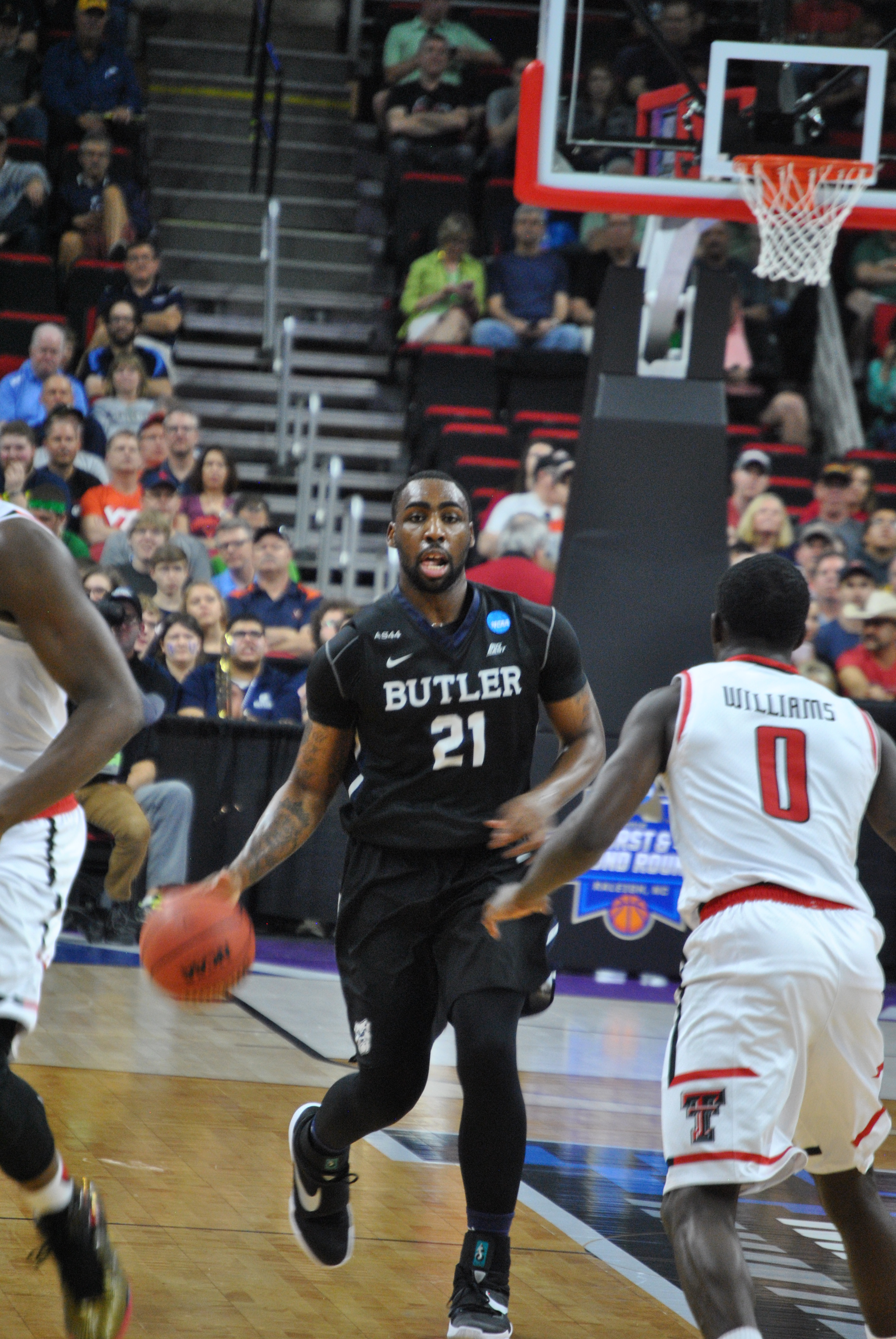
Jones playing against Texas Tech in the 2016 NCAA tournament

Jones was a preseason All-Big East First Team selection as a senior. He earned a spot on the Puerto Rico Tip-Off All-Tournament Team. On December 2, he hit a last-second shot to defeat 17th-ranked Cincinnati after teammate Kellen Dunham led a second-half comeback. Jones was Big East Player of the Week for the week of December 19 after leading the Bulldogs to a 74–68 victory over ninth-ranked Purdue by tallying 19 points, 11 rebounds and five assists. Jones scored 20 points in a 60–55 loss to Villanova on January 10, 2016, despite spraining his wrist in practice before the game. He hit his only three-pointer on January 30, a halfcourt heave before halftime in a game versus Marquette. On February 6, Jones recorded the first triple-double by a Butler player since 1984 with 10 points, 14 rebounds and 10 assists in a blowout victory over St. John's. As a result, he was named CBS Sports National Player of the Week. As a senior, Jones was selected to the All-Big East Second Team. He averaged 13.8 points, 6.6 rebounds and 4.7 assists per game. His 1,533 career points is twelfth highest in Butler history. Jones earned a Bachelor of Arts degrees in both strategic communications and digital media production.

== Professional career ==
Jones was selected by the Canton Charge 16th overall in the 2016 NBA D-League draft. He did not play very much to start his professional career due to a back strain and a minor leg injury, as well as the faster game. By December, Jones began logging more minutes, and had a 21-point, 13-rebound performance on January 11 against the Santa Cruz Warriors. He scored 15 points and grabbed 20 rebounds, fifth most in D-League history, in a 114–107 loss to Grand Rapids Drive on February 2. He started 35 games in his rookie year with the Charge and averaged 6.6 points, 6.4 rebounds and 3.1 assists per game. However, in August 2017 he announced his retirement from basketball due to "unbearable" back pain.

Jones came out of retirement in January 2018 and rejoined the Charge. Jones missed a game against the Erie BayHawks due to an undisclosed injury in February. He averaged 4.3 points and 7.6 rebounds per game in his second season.

== Coaching career ==
On July 19, 2018, Jones was named an assistant coach at Indiana University Kokomo, an NAIA institution. His roles include recruiting coordinator and director of player development initiatives, while contributing to on-court coaching and scouting. Head coach Eric Echelbarger said that Jones "has an unbelievable passion for teaching the game, and his Indianapolis-area connections will be a great asset in our recruiting efforts." In his first season, Jones helped the team to a 26–8 record and a berth in the NAIA Division II Sweet 16. Following the season he was promoted to associate head coach, with an emphasis on teaching defense. In the 2019–20 season, Jones helped the Cougars achieve a 27–7 record and reach the Sweet 16 of the NAIA tournament before the season was cancelled due to the coronavirus pandemic.

For the 2020–21 season, Jones joined the coaching staff at the University of Indianapolis under Paul Corsaro. In the 2021–22 season, Jones helped the Greyhounds finish 19–11 and reach its first-ever appearance in the GLVC tournament championship game. In June 2022, he was named director of basketball operations at Evansville under David Ragland. Jones was promoted to assistant coach at Evansville in July 2023.
