= 2016–17 Creighton Bluejays men's basketball team =

American college basketball season

2016–17 Creighton Bluejays men's basketball

Paradise Jam champions

NCAA tournament, First Round
- Conference: Big East Conference
- Record: 25–10 (10–8 Big East)
- Head coach: Greg McDermott (7th year)
- Assistant coaches: Darian DeVries (19th year); Steve Lutz (7th year); Preston Murphy (2nd year)
- Home arena: CenturyLink Center Omaha

2016–17 Big East men's basketball standings
	Conf.				Overall
Team	W		L	PCT	W		L	PCT
No. 1 Villanova †	15	–	3	.833	32	–	4	.889
No. 21 Butler	12	–	6	.667	25	–	9	.735
Creighton	10	–	8	.556	25	–	10	.714
Seton Hall	10	–	8	.556	21	–	12	.636
Providence	10	–	8	.556	20	–	13	.606
Marquette	10	–	8	.556	19	–	13	.594
Xavier	9	–	9	.500	24	–	14	.632
St. John's	7	–	11	.389	14	–	19	.424
Georgetown	5	–	13	.278	14	–	18	.438
DePaul	2	–	16	.111	9	–	23	.281
† 2017 Big East tournament winner Rankings from AP poll

The 2016–17 Creighton Bluejays men's basketball team represented Creighton University in the 2016–17 NCAA Division I men's basketball season. The Bluejays, led by seventh-year head coach Greg McDermott, played their home games at the CenturyLink Center Omaha, as members of the Big East Conference. They finished the season 25–10, 10–8 in Big East play to finish in a four-way tie for third place. In the Big East tournament, they defeated Providence and Xavier before losing to Villanova in the championship game. They received an at-large bid to the NCAA tournament as a No. 6 seed in the Midwest region. There they lost in the first round to No. 11-seeded Rhode Island.

== Previous season ==
The Bluejays finished the 2015–16 season 20–15, 9–9 in Big East play to finish in sixth place in conference. They lost to Seton Hall in the quarterfinals of the Big East tournament. They received an invitation to the National Invitation Tournament where they beat Alabama in the first round and Wagner in the second round before losing to BYU in the quarterfinals.

== Preseason ==
Prior to the season, Creighton was picked to finish third in a poll of Big East coaches. Maurice Watson Jr. was selected to the preseason All-Big East first team. Marcus Foster received an Honorable Mention.

=== Departures ===
Name	Number	Pos.	Height	Weight	Year	Hometown	Notes
Malik Albert	12	G	6'2"	170	Junior	Detroit, MI	Transferred to Texas A&M–Commerce
Drew Cayce	5	G	6'1"	165	Freshman	Libertyville, IL	Transferred to Illinois
Geoffrey Groselle	41	C	7'0"	240	Senior	Plano, TX	Graduated
James Milliken	23	G	6'3"	185	Senior	Siler City, NC	Graduated
Alex O'Neill	20	F	6'8"	240	Freshman	Peoria, IL	Transferred to St. Cloud State
Marlon Stewart	1	G	6'1"	210	Freshman	Eldridge, IA	Transferred to North Dakota

=== Incoming transfers ===
Name	Number	Pos.	Height	Weight	Year	Hometown	Notes
Kaleb Joseph	14	G	6'3"	165	Junior	Nashua, NH	Transferred from Syracuse. Under NCAA transfer rules, Joseph will have to redshirt for the 2016–17 season. Will have two years of remaining eligibility.
Sam Dunkum	31	F	6'10"	215	Sophomore	North Little Rock, AR	Transferred from Lafayette. Under NCAA transfer rules, Dunkum will not be eligible until the spring semester of the 2017–18 season.

=== 2016 recruiting class ===
College recruiting information
Name	Hometown	School	Height	Weight	Commit date
Davion Mintz; G	Charlotte, NC	North Mecklenburg High School	6 ft 4 in (1.93 m)	170 lb (77 kg)	Oct 4, 2015
Davion Mintz; G	Recruit ratings: Rivals: 247Sports: (N/A)				
Kobe Paras; SG	Quezon City, Philippines	Cathedral High School	6 ft 5 in (1.96 m)	190 lb (86 kg)	Jul 18, 2016
Kobe Paras; SG	Recruit ratings: Scout: Rivals: 247Sports: ESPN:				
Overall recruit ranking:
Note: In many cases, Scout, Rivals, 247Sports, On3, and ESPN may conflict in their listings of height and weight.; In these cases, the average was taken. ESPN grades are on a 100-point scale.; Sources: "2016 Team Ranking". Rivals.

=== 2017 Recruiting class ===
College recruiting information (2016)
Name	Hometown	School	Height	Weight	Commit date
Ty-Shon Alexander; SG	Mouth of Wilson, VA	Oak Hill Academy	6 ft 4 in (1.93 m)	190 lb (86 kg)	Oct 31, 2015
Ty-Shon Alexander; SG	Recruit ratings: Scout: Rivals: 247Sports: ESPN:				
Mitch Ballock; SG	Eudora, KS	Eudora High School	6 ft 5 in (1.96 m)	185 lb (84 kg)	Feb 7, 2016
Mitch Ballock; SG	Recruit ratings: Scout: Rivals: 247Sports: ESPN:				
Overall recruit ranking:
Note: In many cases, Scout, Rivals, 247Sports, On3, and ESPN may conflict in their listings of height and weight.; In these cases, the average was taken. ESPN grades are on a 100-point scale.; Sources: "2017 Team Ranking". Rivals.

== Roster ==
2016–17 Creighton Bluejays men's basketball team
Players
Coaches

Pos.	#	Name	Height	Weight	Year	Previous school	Hometown
G	0	Marcus Foster	6 ft 3 in (1.91 m)	210 lb (95 kg)	RS Jr	Hirschi HS; Kansas State	Wichita Falls, TX
G	1	Davion Mintz	6 ft 3 in (1.91 m)	175 lb (79 kg)	Fr	North Mecklenburg HS	Charlotte, NC
G	2	Khyri Thomas	6 ft 3 in (1.91 m)	205 lb (93 kg)	So	Fork Union	Omaha, NE
G	4	Ronnie Harrell Jr.	6 ft 7 in (2.01 m)	195 lb (88 kg)	RS So	East HS	Denver, CO
G	5	Jordan Scurry (W)	6 ft 2 in (1.88 m)	205 lb (93 kg)	Fr	St. Mark's	Chestnut Hill, MA
G	10	Maurice Watson (injured)	5 ft 10 in (1.78 m)	175 lb (79 kg)	Sr	Boys' Latin; Boston University	Philadelphia, PA
G	11	Tyler Clement (W)	6 ft 1 in (1.85 m)	185 lb (84 kg)	Jr	St. Thomas Aquinas HS	Overland Park, KS
F	13	Cole Huff	6 ft 8 in (2.03 m)	220 lb (100 kg)	Sr	Campbell Hall; Nevada	Altadena, CA
G	14	Kaleb Joseph (redshirt)	6 ft 3 in (1.91 m)	180 lb (82 kg)	Jr	Cushing Academy; Syracuse	Nashua, NH
F	15	Martin Krampelj	6 ft 9 in (2.06 m)	225 lb (102 kg)	RS Fr	Impact Academy	Grosuplje, Slovenia
G	21	Isaiah Zierden	6 ft 3 in (1.91 m)	190 lb (86 kg)	RS Sr	Benilde-St. Margaret's	St. Louis Park, MN
C	23	Justin Patton	7 ft 0 in (2.13 m)	230 lb (104 kg)	RS Fr	Omaha North HS	Omaha, NE
G	24	Kobe Paras	6 ft 6 in (1.98 m)	200 lb (91 kg)	Fr	Cathedral HS	Quezon City, Philippines
F	31	Sam Dunkum (redshirt)	6 ft 10 in (2.08 m)	215 lb (98 kg)	So	North Little Rock High School; Lafayette	North Little Rock, AR
F	32	Toby Hegner	6 ft 10 in (2.08 m)	235 lb (107 kg)	RS Jr	Berlin HS	Berlin, WI
F	40	Zach Hanson (injured)	6 ft 9 in (2.06 m)	245 lb (111 kg)	Sr	T. F. Riggs	Pierre, SD

Head coach

- Greg McDermott (Northern Iowa)

Assistant coach(es)

- Darian DeVries (Northern Iowa)
- Steve Lutz (Texas Lutheran)
- Steve Merfeld (UW–La Crosse)
- Preston Murphy (Rhode Island)

Legend

- (C) Team captain
- (S) Suspended
- (I) Ineligible
- (W) Walk-on
- Injured
- Current redshirt

Roster

Pos.	Starting 5	Bench 1	Bench 2
C	Justin Patton	Zach Hanson	Martin Krampelj
PF	Cole Huff	Toby Hegner	Ronnie Harrell
SF	Khyri Thomas	Kobe Paras
SG	Marcus Foster	Isaiah Zierden	Jordan Scurry
PG	Davion Mintz	Tyler Clement

== Schedule and results ==
Date time, TV	Rank^{#}	Opponent^{#}	Result	Record	High points	High rebounds	High assists	Site (attendance) city, state
Exhibition
Nov 4, 2016*; 7:00 pm	No. 22	Wayne State	W 93–46		13 – Foster	7 – 2 tied	7 – Watson Jr.	CenturyLink Center (15,128); Omaha, NE
Regular season
Nov 11, 2016*; 7:00 pm, FS2	No. 22	UMKC	W 89–82	1–0	17 – Watson Jr.	8 – Patton	9 – Watson Jr.	CenturyLink Center (16,686); Omaha, NE
Nov 15, 2016*; 7:30 pm, FS1	No. 22	No. 9 Wisconsin; Gavitt Tipoff Games	W 79–67	2–0	18 – Thomas	7 – Patton	10 – Watson Jr.	CenturyLink Center (17,879); Omaha, NE
Nov 18, 2016*; 7:30 pm	No. 22	vs. Washington State; Paradise Jam quarterfinals	W 103–77	3–0	19 – Huff	6 – Huff	13 – Watson Jr.	Sports and Fitness Center (2,223); St. Thomas, VI
Nov 20, 2016*; 7:30 pm, CBSSN	No. 22	vs. NC State; Paradise Jam semifinals	W 112–94	4–0	20 – Huff	10 – Huff	7 – Watson Jr.	Sports and Fitness Center (2,755); St. Thomas, VI
Nov 21, 2016*; 7:30 pm, CBSSN	No. 12	vs. Ole Miss; Paradise Jam finals	W 86–77	5–0	25 – Foster	6 – Foster	7 – Watson Jr.	Sports and Fitness Center (2,699); St. Thomas, VI
Nov 26, 2016*; 3:30 pm, FS2	No. 12	Loyola (MD)	W 82–52	6–0	17 – Patton	6 – Patton	4 – Watson Jr.	CenturyLink Center (16,907); Omaha, NE
Nov 29, 2016*; 7:30 pm, FS1	No. 10	Buffalo	W 93–72	7–0	22 – Foster	12 – Thomas	8 – Watson Jr.	CenturyLink Center (16,434); Omaha, NE
Dec 3, 2016*; 7:00 pm, FS2	No. 10	Akron	W 82–70	8–0	27 – Foster	7 – Patton	13 – Watson Jr.	CenturyLink Center (16,852); Omaha, NE
Dec 7, 2016*; 8:00 pm, BTN	No. 10	at Nebraska; Rivalry	W 77–62	9–0	25 – Watson Jr.	10 – 2 tied	8 – Watson Jr.	Pinnacle Bank Arena (15,902); Lincoln, NE
Dec 9, 2016*; 6:30 pm, FS1	No. 10	Longwood	W 113–58	10–0	16 – 2 tied	9 – 2 tied	11 – Watson Jr.	CenturyLink Center (16,697); Omaha, NE
Dec 17, 2016*; 7:00 pm, FS2	No. 10	Oral Roberts	W 66–65	11–0	22 – Foster	6 – Foster/Patton	10 – Watson Jr.	CenturyLink Center (16,489); Omaha, NE
Dec 20, 2016*; 8:00 pm, ESPN2	No. 9	at Arizona State	W 96–85	12–0	29 – Foster	9 – Hegner	7 – Watson Jr.	Wells Fargo Arena (14,198); Tempe, AZ
Dec 28, 2016; 7:00 pm, FS2	No. 10	Seton Hall	W 89–75	13–0 (1–0)	21 – Watson Jr.	9 – Patton	10 – Watson Jr.	CenturyLink Center (18,084); Omaha, NE
Dec 31, 2016; 12:00 pm, FS1	No. 10	No. 1 Villanova	L 70–80	13–1 (1–1)	22 – Foster	8 – Patton	9 – Watson Jr.	CenturyLink Center (18,831); Omaha, NE
Jan 4, 2017; 7:30 pm, FS1	No. 10	at St. John's	W 85–72	14–1 (2–1)	25 – Patton	9 – Patton	2 – Watson Jr.	Carnesecca Arena (4,928); Queens, NY
Jan 7, 2017; 1:00 pm, CBSSN	No. 10	at Providence	W 78–64	15–1 (3–1)	20 – Patton	6 – Patton	14 – Watson Jr.	Dunkin' Donuts Center (8,176); Providence, RI
Jan 11, 2017; 8:00 pm, FS1	No. 8	No. 12 Butler	W 75–64	16–1 (4–1)	21 – Watson Jr.	12 – Thomas	7 – Watson Jr.	CenturyLink Center (18,032); Omaha, NE
Jan 14, 2017*; 12:00 pm, FS2	No. 8	Truman State	W 101–69	17–1	21 – Foster	10 – Patton	6 – Watson Jr.	CenturyLink Center (17,466); Omaha, NE
Jan 16, 2017; 1:00 pm, FS1	No. 7	at No. 22 Xavier; MLK Day Marathon	W 72–67	18–1 (5–1)	15 – Foster	9 – Patton	4 – Thomas	Cintas Center (10,348); Cincinnati, OH
Jan 21, 2017; 1:30 pm, FOX	No. 7	Marquette	L 94–102	18–2 (5–2)	30 – Foster	5 – Zierden	8 – Mintz	CenturyLink Center (18,145); Omaha, NE
Jan 25, 2017; 6:00 pm, FSN/MASN2	No. 16	at Georgetown	L 51–71	18–3 (5–3)	20 – Patton	8 – Thomas	3 – Huff	Verizon Center (8,185); Washington, D.C.
Jan 28, 2017; 1:30 pm, FS1	No. 16	DePaul	W 83–66	19–3 (6–3)	18 – Thomas	7 – Thomas	6 – Thomas	CenturyLink Center (17,611); Omaha, NE
Jan 31, 2017; 6:00 pm, FS1	No. 22	at No. 16 Butler	W 76–67	20–3 (7–3)	15 – 3 tied	7 – Patton	6 – Clement	Hinkle Fieldhouse (9,100); Indianapolis, IN
Feb 4, 2017; 2:00 pm, FOX	No. 22	Xavier	L 80–82	20–4 (7–4)	17 – Foster	7 – Huff	5 – Thomas	CenturyLink Center (17,886); Omaha, NE
Feb 11, 2017; 1:00 pm, FS1	No. 23	at DePaul	W 93–58	21–4 (8–4)	14 – Hegner	11 – Patton	7 – Thomas	Allstate Arena (6,409); Rosemont, IL
Feb 15, 2017; 7:00 pm, CBSSN	No. 20	at Seton Hall	L 81–87	21–5 (8–5)	23 – Foster	6 – Foster	6 – Foster	Prudential Center (6,637); Newark, NJ
Feb 19, 2017; 2:35 pm, FS1	No. 20	Georgetown	W 87–70	22–5 (9–5)	35 – Foster	6 – 2 tied	6 – Foster	CenturyLink Center (17,626); Omaha, NE
Feb 22, 2017; 8:00 pm, FSN	No. 23	Providence	L 66–68	22–6 (9–6)	18 – Foster	9 – Thomas	4 – Mintz	CenturyLink Center (17,382); Omaha, NE
Feb 25, 2017; 2:00 pm, FOX	No. 23	at No. 2 Villanova	L 63–79	22–7 (9–7)	25 – Foster	5 – 2 tied	8 – Foster	The Pavilion (6,500); Villanova, PA
Feb 28, 2017; 7:00 pm, CBSSN		St. John's	W 82–68	23–7 (10–7)	18 – Foster	12 – Thomas	7 – Thomas	CenturyLink Center (17,006); Omaha, NE
Mar 4, 2017; 1:30 pm, FS2		at Marquette	L 83–91	23–8 (10–8)	23 – Thomas	7 – Thomas	7 – Mintz	BMO Harris Bradley Center (17,630); Milwaukee, WI
Big East tournament
Mar 9, 2017; 8:30 pm, FS1	(6)	vs. (3) Providence; Quarterfinals	W 70–58	24–8	19 – Thomas	8 – Patton	2 – 3 tied	Madison Square Garden (16,003); New York City, NY
Mar 10, 2017; 8:00 pm, FS1	(6)	vs. (7) Xavier; Semifinals	W 75–72	25–8	21 – 2 tied	4 – Thomas	8 – Thomas	Madison Square Garden (19,812); New York City, NY
Mar 11, 2017; 4:30 pm, FOX	(6)	vs. (1) Villanova; Championship	L 60–74	25–9	13 – 2 tied	7 – Harrell Jr.	3 – Harrell Jr.	Madison Square Garden (19,812); New York City, NY
2017 NCAA tournament
Mar 16, 2017*; 3:30 pm, TBS	(6 MW)	vs. (11 MW) Rhode Island; First Round	L 72–84	25–10	15 – 2 tied	7 – 2 tied	4 – Harrell Jr.	Golden 1 Center (15,833); Sacramento, CA
*Non-conference game. ^{#}Rankings from AP Poll. (#) Tournament seedings in parentheses. All times are in Central Time.

== Rankings ==
Ranking movements Legend: ██ Increase in ranking ██ Decrease in ranking RV = Received votes
	Week																			
Poll	Pre	1	2	3	4	5	6	7	8	9	10	11	12	13	14	15	16	17	18	Final
AP	22	22	12	10	10	10	9	10	10	8	7	16	22	23	20	23	RV	RV	RV	Not released
Coaches	23	20	18	12	12	10	9	9	10	8	7	16	22	23	22	23	RV	RV	RV	

*AP does not release post-NCAA tournament rankings
