= Boys Latin School =

Boys Latin School may refer to:

- Boys' Latin School of Maryland
- Boys' Latin of Philadelphia Charter School
