= Hernandez Stroud =

American lawyer

Personal details
- Born: August 31, 1988 (age 38) Huntsville, Alabama
- Education: University of Alabama at Birmingham (B.A.); University of Pennsylvania (M.S.); Washington and Lee University School of Law (J.D.)

Hernandez Stroud (born August 31, 1988) is senior legal advisor to the Federal receiver overseeing the New York City jail system. He previously served as senior fellow and senior counsel in the Justice Program at the Brennan Center for Justice at New York University School of Law. An expert on prisons and jails and constitutional law, he researches and drafts criminal justice policy reforms at the federal level; he also studies federal judicial intervention into state prisons and local jails, particularly court takeovers of correctional institutions through receivership. He serves as an adjunct assistant professor at Columbia University and the New York University School of Law. He is also an affiliated fellow at Yale Law School.

== Early life and education ==
Hernandez D. Stroud was born on August 31, 1988, in Huntsville, Alabama, where he was raised by his parents and grandparents. The first in his family to graduate from college, he attended the University of Alabama at Birmingham on full merit-based scholarships, graduating with a Bachelor of Arts with university and departmental honors in history and political science in 2010. He was elected president of the Student Government Association. After college, Stroud earned a Master of Science in education policy from the University of Pennsylvania in 2012. While at Penn, Stroud also taught history and government as a full-time high schoolteacher at Boys' Latin of Philadelphia Charter School in West Philadelphia, Pennsylvania through Teach for America. After Penn and Teach for America, Stroud received his Juris Doctor from Washington and Lee University School of Law in 2015. He won the Randall P. Bezanson Award at graduation.

== Professional career ==
After law school, Stroud earned a fellowship at Yale Law School from 2015 to 2016. There, he studied and lectured on constitutional and criminal-law implications of state responses to drug addiction during pregnancy; he also advised several state and local governments on a range of criminal legal matters. During his fellowship at Yale Law, he also served as acting director of policy for former Mayor Toni Harp of the City of New Haven, Connecticut. After working at Yale and for New Haven, he served as a law clerk for Judge Madeline Hughes Haikala of the United States District Court for the Northern District of Alabama from 2016 to 2017. After clerking for Haikala, Stroud returned to Washington and Lee Law as a professor, teaching civil rights, statutory interpretation, and advanced legal writing. Stroud then worked as a law clerk to Judge O. Rogeriee Thompson of the United States Court of Appeals for the First Circuit from 2018 to 2019. After clerking for Thompson, from to 2019 to 2020, Stroud joined the Boston College Law School faculty as the inaugural Robert F. Drinan Visiting Assistant Professor of Law. He taught civil rights and advanced legal writing.

== Personal life ==
Stroud was on the Forbes 30 Under 30 list for 2018.
