= 2015–16 Creighton Bluejays men's basketball team =

American college basketball season

2015–16 Creighton Bluejays men's basketball

Men Who Speak Up Main Event champions

NIT, Quarterfinals
- Conference: Big East Conference
- Record: 20–15 (9–9 Big East)
- Head coach: Greg McDermott (6th year)
- Assistant coaches: Darian DeVries (18th year); Steve Lutz (6th year); Steve Merfeld (6th year); Preston Murphy (1st year)
- Home arena: CenturyLink Center Omaha

2015–16 Big East men's basketball standings
	Conf.				Overall
Team	W		L	PCT	W		L	PCT
No. 6 Villanova	16	–	2	.889	35	–	5	.875
No. 9 Xavier	14	–	4	.778	28	–	5	.848
No. 20 Seton Hall †	12	–	6	.667	25	–	9	.735
Providence	10	–	8	.556	24	–	11	.686
Butler	10	–	8	.556	22	–	11	.667
Creighton	9	–	9	.500	20	–	15	.571
Marquette	8	–	10	.444	20	–	13	.606
Georgetown	7	–	11	.389	15	–	18	.455
DePaul	3	–	15	.167	9	–	22	.290
St. John's	1	–	17	.056	8	–	24	.250
† 2016 Big East tournament winner Rankings from AP poll

The 2015–16 Creighton Bluejays men's basketball team represented Creighton University in the 2015–16 NCAA Division I men's basketball season. The Bluejays, led by sixth-year head coach Greg McDermott, played their home games at the CenturyLink Center Omaha, and were members of the Big East Conference. They finished the season 20–15, 9–9 in Big East play to finish in sixth place. They lost to Seton Hall in the quarterfinals of the Big East tournament. They received an invitation to the National Invitation Tournament where, as a #4 seed, they defeated Alabama and Wagner to advance to the quarterfinals where they lost to BYU.

== Previous season ==
The Bluejays finished the 2014–15 season 14–19, 4–14 in Big East play to finish last in the conference. They defeated DePaul in the first round of the Big East tournament and lost to Georgetown in the quarterfinals. The Bluejays finished with a losing record for the first time in 18 years, dating back to the 1995–96 season.

== Off season ==
=== Departures ===
Name	Number	Pos.	Height	Weight	Year	Hometown	Notes
Will Artino	31	C	6'11"	230	Senior	Waukee, IA	Graduated
Devin Brooks	5	G	6'2"	175	Senior	Harlem, NY	Graduated
Austin Chatman	1	G	6'0"	175	Senior	The Colony, TX	Graduated
Gabriel Connealy	2	F	6'4"	205	Junior	Mullen, NE	Graduated
Avery Dingman	22	G	6'6"	215	Senior	Branson, MO	Graduated
Leon Gilmore III	0	F	6'7"	210	Freshman	Manvel, TX	Transferred to Stephen F. Austin
Ricky Kreklow	15	G	6'7"	195	RS Senior	Columbia, MO	Graduated
Mogboluwaga Ogini	50	F	6'8"	225	Junior	St. Louis, MO	Graduated

=== Incoming transfers ===
Name	Number	Pos.	Height	Weight	Year	Hometown	Notes
Malik Albert	12	G	6'2"	165	Junior	Detroit, MI	Transferred from Mott CC. Albert will be eligible to play immediately.
Marcus Foster	22	G	6'3"	210	Junior	Wichita Falls, TX	Transferred from Kansas State. Under NCAA transfer rules, Foster will have to redshirt for the 2015–16 season. Will have two years of remaining eligibility.

== Incoming recruits ==
College recruiting information
Name	Hometown	School	Height	Weight	Commit date
Justin Patton; C	Omaha, NE	Omaha North High School	6 ft 10 in (2.08 m)	205 lb (93 kg)	Jun 17, 2014
Justin Patton; C	Recruit ratings: Scout: Rivals: (80)				
Marlon Stewart; PG	Rock Island, IA	North Scott High School	6 ft 3 in (1.91 m)	190 lb (86 kg)	Sep 25, 2014
Marlon Stewart; PG	Recruit ratings: Rivals: (76)				
Khyri Thomas; SG	Omaha, NE	Fork Union Military Academy	6 ft 4 in (1.93 m)	180 lb (82 kg)	Feb 15, 2015
Khyri Thomas; SG	Recruit ratings: Rivals: (POST)				
Martin Krampelj; PF	Grosuplje, Slovenia	Impact Basketball Academy	6 ft 8 in (2.03 m)	205 lb (93 kg)	Nov 12, 2014
Martin Krampelj; PF	Recruit ratings: Rivals: (POST)				
Overall recruit ranking:
Note: In many cases, Scout, Rivals, 247Sports, On3, and ESPN may conflict in their listings of height and weight.; In these cases, the average was taken. ESPN grades are on a 100-point scale.; Sources: "2015 Team Ranking". Rivals.

== Roster ==
2015–16 Creighton Bluejays men's basketball team
Players
Coaches

Pos.	#	Name	Height	Weight	Year	Previous school	Hometown
C	0	Justin Patton (redshirt)	6 ft 11 in (2.11 m)	215 lb (98 kg)	Fr	Omaha North HS	Omaha, NE
G	1	Marlon Stewart	6 ft 1 in (1.85 m)	210 lb (95 kg)	Fr	North Scott HS	Eldridge, IA
G	2	Khyri Thomas	6 ft 3 in (1.91 m)	200 lb (91 kg)	Fr	Fork Union	Omaha, NE
G	4	Ronnie Harrell Jr.	6 ft 7 in (2.01 m)	190 lb (86 kg)	RS Fr	East HS	Denver, CO
G	5	Drew Cayce (W) (redshirt)	6 ft 1 in (1.85 m)	165 lb (75 kg)	Fr	La Lumiere	Libertyville, IL
G	10	Maurice Watson	5 ft 10 in (1.78 m)	170 lb (77 kg)	Jr	Boys' Latin; Boston University	Philadelphia, PA
G	11	Tyler Clement (W)	6 ft 1 in (1.85 m)	185 lb (84 kg)	So	St. Thomas Aquinas	Overland Park, KS
G	12	Malik Albert	6 ft 2 in (1.88 m)	170 lb (77 kg)	Jr	Martin Luther King HS; Mott CC	Detroit, MI
F	13	Cole Huff	6 ft 8 in (2.03 m)	215 lb (98 kg)	Jr	Campbell Hall HS; Nevada	Altadena, CA
F	15	Martin Krampelj (injured)	6 ft 9 in (2.06 m)	205 lb (93 kg)	Fr	Impact	Grosuplje, Slovenia
F	20	Alex O'Neill (W) (redshirt)	6 ft 8 in (2.03 m)	240 lb (109 kg)	Fr	Peoria Christian	Peoria, IL
G	21	Isaiah Zierden	6 ft 3 in (1.91 m)	185 lb (84 kg)	RS Jr	Benilde-St. Margaret's	St. Louis Park, MN
G	22	Marcus Foster (redshirt)	6 ft 3 in (1.91 m)	210 lb (95 kg)	Jr	Hirschi HS; Kansas St	Wichita Falls, TX
G	23	James Milliken	6 ft 3 in (1.91 m)	185 lb (84 kg)	RS Sr	Jordan–Matthews; Cowley County CC	Siler City, NC
F	32	Toby Hegner	6 ft 10 in (2.08 m)	225 lb (102 kg)	RS So	Berlin	Berlin, WI
F	40	Zach Hanson	6 ft 9 in (2.06 m)	250 lb (113 kg)	Jr	T. F. Riggs	Pierre, SD
C	41	Geoffrey Groselle (W)	7 ft 0 in (2.13 m)	240 lb (109 kg)	Sr	Plano West	Plano, TX

Head coach

- Greg McDermott (Northern Iowa)

Assistant coach(es)

- Darian DeVries (Northern Iowa)
- Steve Lutz (Texas Lutheran)
- Steve Merfeld (UW–La Crosse)
- Preston Murphy (Rhode Island)

Legend

- (C) Team captain
- (S) Suspended
- (I) Ineligible
- (W) Walk-on
- Injured
- Current redshirt

Roster

=== Depth chart ===
Pos.	Starting 5	Bench 1	Bench 2	Bench 3
C	Geoffrey Groselle	Zach Hanson
PF	Cole Huff	Toby Hegner
SF	Khyri Thomas	Ronnie Harrell
SG	James Milliken	Isaiah Zierden
PG	Maurice Watson	Malik Albert	Tyler Clement	Marlon Stewart

== Schedule ==
Date time, TV	Rank^{#}	Opponent^{#}	Result	Record	Site (attendance) city, state
Exhibition
Nov 6*; 7:05 pm		Upper Iowa	W 113–77		CenturyLink Center (15,015); Omaha, NE
Non-conference regular season
Nov 14*; 8:30 pm, FS2		Texas Southern; Men Who Speak Up Main Event	W 93–70	1–0	CenturyLink Center (16,538); Omaha, NE
Nov 17*; 7:00 pm, FS2		UTSA; Men Who Speak Up Main Event	W 103–78	2–0	CenturyLink Center (16,580); Omaha, NE
Nov 19*; 6:00 pm, BTN		at No. 14 Indiana; Gavitt Tipoff Games	L 65–86	2–1	Assembly Hall (17,472); Bloomington, IN
Nov 23*; 11:00 pm, YouTube		vs. Rutgers; Men Who Speak Up Main Event; Heavyweight semifinals	W 85–75	3–1	MGM Grand Garden Arena (1,000); Paradise, NV
Nov 25*; 8:30 pm, ESPN2		vs. UMass; Men Who Speak Up Main Event; Heavyweight Championship	W 97–76	4–1	MGM Grand Garden Arena (1,623); Paradise, NV
Nov 28*; 7:00 pm, FS2		Western Illinois	W 97–67	5–1	CenturyLink Center (16,118); Omaha, NE
Dec 2*; 8:00 pm, CBSSN		Arizona State	L 77–79	5–2	CenturyLink Center (16,282); Omaha, NE
Dec 5*; 1:00 pm, ESPN3		at Loyola–Chicago	L 65–68	5–3	Joseph J. Gentile Arena (4,963); Chicago, IL
Dec 9*; 7:00 pm, CBSSN		Nebraska; Rivalry	W 83–67	6–3	CenturyLink Center (17,776); Omaha, NE
Dec 12*; 4:00 pm, FS1		IUPUI	W 90–65	7–3	CenturyLink Center (16,785); Omaha, NE
Dec 19*; 1:00 pm, ESPNU		at No. 3 Oklahoma	L 74–87	7–4	Lloyd Noble Center (9,528); Norman, OK
Dec 21*; 8:00 pm, FS1		North Texas	W 105–82	8–4	CenturyLink Center (17,518); Omaha, NE
Dec 28*; 8:00 pm, FS1		Coppin State	W 102–77	9–4	CenturyLink Center (17,137); Omaha, NE
Big East Conference play
Dec 31; 1:00 pm, FS1		at St. John's	W 80–70	10–4 (1–0)	Carnesecca Arena (4,633); Queens, NY
Jan 2; 9:00 pm, FS1		No. 16 Villanova; Big East New Year's Marathon	L 71–85	10–5 (1–1)	CenturyLink Center (17,375); Omaha, NE
Jan 5; 8:15 pm, FS1		Georgetown	W 79–66	11–5 (2–1)	CenturyLink Center (16,425); Omaha, NE
Jan 9; 1:00 pm, FS1		at Seton Hall	W 82–67	12–5 (3–1)	Prudential Center (8,010); Newark, NJ
Jan 12; 7:30 pm, FS1		No. 12 Providence	L 48–50	12–6 (3–2)	CenturyLink Center (17,073); Omaha, NE
Jan 17; 12:00 pm, FS1		at DePaul	W 91–80	13–6 (4–2)	Allstate Arena (5,534); Rosemont, IL
Jan 23; 6:30 pm, FS1		No. 18 Butler	W 72–64	14–6 (5–2)	CenturyLink Center (17,677); Omaha, NE
Jan 26; 5:30 pm, FS1		at Georgetown	L 73–74	14–7 (5–3)	Verizon Center (6,897); Washington, D.C.
Jan 30; 7:00 pm, FSN		Seton Hall	L 65–75	14–8 (5–4)	CenturyLink Center (17,924); Omaha, NE
Feb 3; 7:00 pm, CBSSN		at No. 3 Villanova	L 58–83	14–9 (5–5)	The Pavilion (6,500); Villanova, PA
Feb 6; 1:00 pm, FSN		DePaul	W 88–66	15–9 (6–5)	CenturyLink Center (17,139); Omaha, NE
Feb 9; 7:00 pm, CBSSN		No. 5 Xavier	W 70–56	16–9 (7–5)	CenturyLink Center (17,011); Omaha, NE
Feb 13; 8:00 pm, FSN		Marquette	W 65–62	17–9 (8–5)	BMO Harris Bradley Center (15,844); Milwaukee, WI
Feb 16; 6:00 pm, FS1		at Butler	L 75–88	17–10 (8–6)	Hinkle Fieldhouse (7,330); Indianapolis, IN
Feb 24; 7:00 pm, FS1		Marquette	L 61–66	17–11 (8–7)	CenturyLink Center (17,412); Omaha, NE
Feb 28; 1:30 pm, FS1		St. John's	W 100–59	18–11 (9–7)	CenturyLink Center (17,351); Omaha, NE
Mar 2; 8:00 pm, CBSSN		at Providence	L 66–70	18–12 (9–8)	Dunkin' Donuts Center (9,252); Providence, RI
Mar 5; 1:30 pm, FOX		at No. 5 Xavier	L 93–98	18–13 (9–9)	Cintas Center (10,633); Cincinnati, OH
Big East tournament
Mar 10; 8:30 pm, FS1	(6)	vs. (3) Seton Hall; Quarterfinals	L 73–81	18–14	Madison Square Garden (13,813); New York City, NY
National Invitation tournament
Mar 15*; 8:00 pm, ESPN	(4)	(5) Alabama; First Round – St. Bonaventure Bracket	W 72–54	19–14	CenturyLink Center (6,305); Omaha, NE
Mar 19*; 11:00 am, ESPN	(4)	(8) Wagner; Second Round – St. Bonaventure Bracket	W 87–54	20–14	CenturyLink Center (6,471); Omaha, NE
Mar 22*; 8:00 pm, ESPN	(4)	at (2) BYU; Quarterfinals – St. Bonaventure Bracket	L 82–88	20–15	Marriott Center (15,525); Provo, UT
*Non-conference game. ^{#}Rankings from AP Poll. (#) Tournament seedings in parentheses. All times are in Central Time.
