= Khyri Thomas =

American basketball player (born 1996)

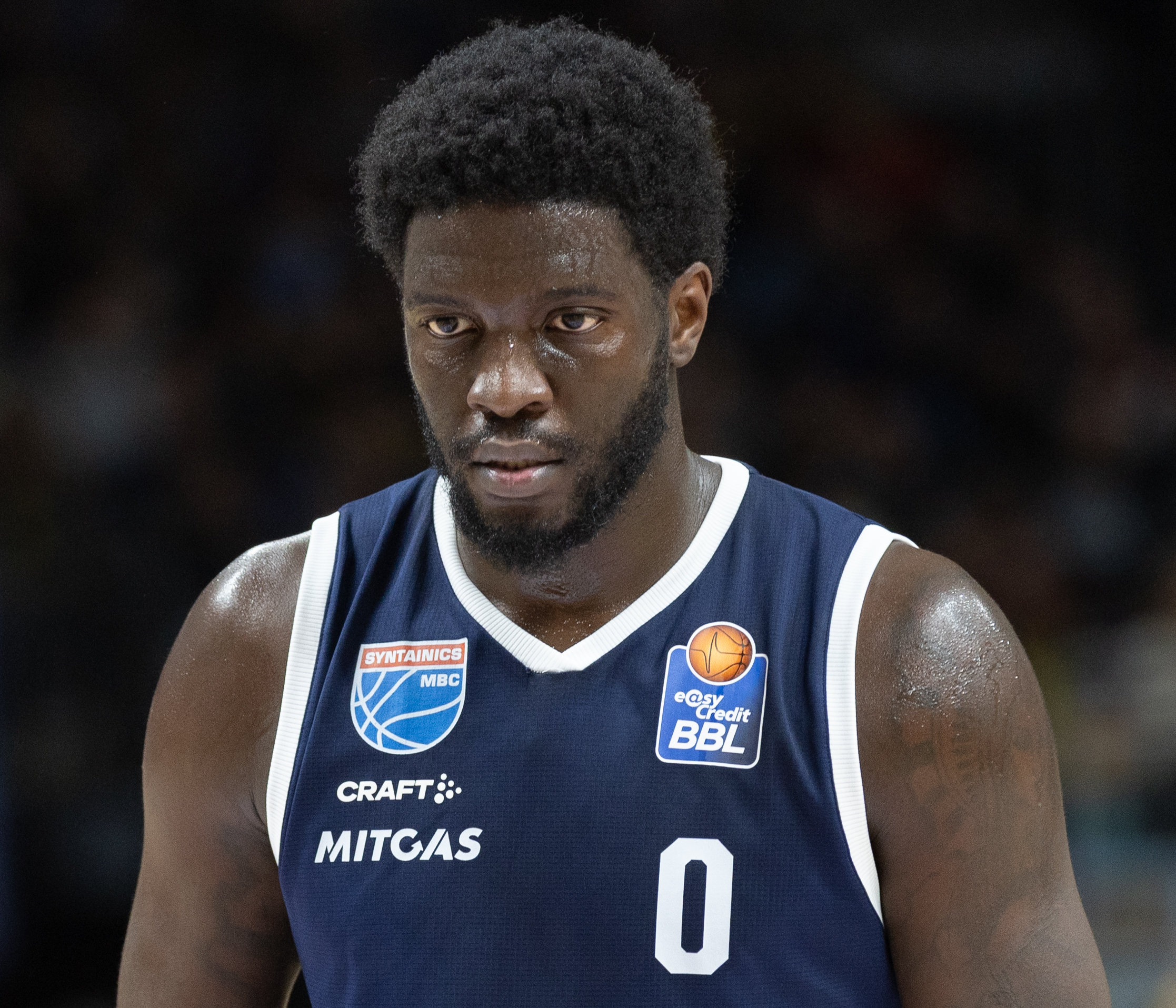
- Thomas in 2025

No. 0 – Petkim Spor
- Position: Shooting guard
- League: BSL

Personal information
- Born: May 8, 1996 (age 30) Omaha, Nebraska, U.S.
- Listed height: 6 ft 3 in (1.91 m)
- Listed weight: 210 lb (95 kg)

Career information
- High school: Omaha Benson (Omaha, Nebraska); Fork Union Military Academy (Fork Union, Virginia)
- College: Creighton (2015–2018)
- NBA draft: 2018: 2nd round, 38th overall pick
- Drafted by: Philadelphia 76ers
- Playing career: 2018–present

Career history
- 2018–2020: Detroit Pistons
- 2018–2020: →Grand Rapids Drive
- 2021: Austin Spurs
- 2021: Houston Rockets
- 2021–2022: Surne Bilbao Basket
- 2022: Maccabi Tel Aviv
- 2022: Tofaş
- 2023: CB San Pablo Burgos
- 2023–2024: Petkim Spor
- 2025: Calgary Surge
- 2025–2026: Mitteldeutscher BC
- 2026–present: Petkim Spor

Career highlights
- 2× Big East Defensive Player of the Year (2017, 2018); Second-team All-Big East (2018)
- Stats at NBA.com
- Stats at Basketball Reference

Khyri Jaquan Thomas (born May 8, 1996) is an American professional basketball player for Petkim Spor of the Basketbol Süper Ligi (BSL). He played college basketball for the Creighton Bluejays. He was drafted 38th overall by the Philadelphia 76ers in the 2018 NBA draft and then traded to the Detroit Pistons.

== Early life ==
Thomas attended Omaha Benson High School Magnet in Omaha, Nebraska. He committed to Creighton University to play college basketball. Prior to attending Creighton, he attended Fork Union Military Academy.

== College career ==
As a freshman at Creighton, Thomas averaged 6.2 points, 1.4 assists and 3.7 rebounds per game. As a sophomore, he averaged 12.3 points, 3.3 assists and 5.8 rebounds and was named the Big East Defensive Player of the Year along with Josh Hart and Mikal Bridges. As a junior, he averaged 15.1 points, 2.8 assists and 4.4 rebounds and again was named the Big East Defensive Player of the Year. He entered the 2018 NBA draft without initially hiring an agent, but on May 13 announced he was staying in the draft and forfeiting his final season at Creighton.

== Professional career ==
=== Detroit Pistons (2018–2020) ===
On June 21, 2018, Thomas was drafted 38th overall by the Philadelphia 76ers in the 2018 NBA draft. He was then traded to the Detroit Pistons in exchange for two future second-round draft picks. Thomas made his NBA debut on November 9, 2018, against the Atlanta Hawks, playing four minutes and making a three pointer.

On November 20, 2020, the Pistons traded Thomas to the Atlanta Hawks; he was waived shortly after.

=== Austin Spurs (2021) ===
On December 13, 2020, Thomas was reported to have had signed with and waived by the San Antonio Spurs. He was later included in roster of Austin Spurs where he appeared in seven games and averaged 13.9 points, 3.4 rebounds and 2.3 three-pointers made on 45.7% shooting, which was the fourth-highest three-point percentage of any player who averaged at least 2.0 three pointers with two or more games played.

=== Houston Rockets (2021) ===
On May 7, 2021, Thomas signed a 10-day contract with the Houston Rockets. In his first two days on this contract, he averaged 21.5 points on 57.1% shooting. On May 8, 2021, Thomas scored a career-high 27 points with five rebounds, five steals, three assists and two blocks in a 116–124 loss to the Utah Jazz. On May 14, he signed a multi-year contract with the Rockets. However, he was waived on October 6.

=== Bilbao Basket (2021–2022) ===
On November 24, 2021, Thomas signed with Bilbao Basket of the Liga ACB. He played only two games for the team.

=== Maccabi Tel Aviv (2022) ===
On January 10, 2022, Thomas signed with Maccabi Tel Aviv of the Israeli Basketball Premier League and the EuroLeague.

=== Tofaş (2022) ===
On July 15, 2022, he has signed with Tofaş of Basketbol Süper Ligi (BSL). In October 2022, after playing only two games with his new club, he decided to give a break to his professional career for personal reasons.

=== Petkim Spor (2023–2024) ===
On July 25, 2023, he signed with Petkim Spor of the Basketbol Süper Ligi (BSL).

=== Calgary Surge (2025) ===
On March 24, 2025, Thomas signed a one-year contract with the Calgary Surge of the Canadian Elite Basketball League. He was the first player to sign with the team for the 2025 season.

=== Mitteldeutscher BC (2025–2026) ===
On July 24, 2025, he signed with Mitteldeutscher BC of the Basketball Bundesliga.

=== Petkim Spor (2026–present) ===
On May 15, 2026, he signed with Petkim Spor of the Basketbol Süper Ligi (BSL) for a second stint.

== Career statistics ==
Legend
GP	Games played	GS	Games started	MPG	Minutes per game
FG%	Field goal percentage	3P%	3-point field goal percentage	FT%	Free throw percentage
RPG	Rebounds per game	APG	Assists per game	SPG	Steals per game
BPG	Blocks per game	PPG	Points per game	**Bold**	Career high

=== NBA ===
==== Regular season ====
Year	Team	GP	GS	MPG	FG%	3P%	FT%	RPG	APG	SPG	BPG	PPG
2018–19	Detroit	**26**	0	7.5	.319	.286	.636	.8	.3	.3	.2	2.3
2019–20	Detroit	8	0	7.6	.294	**.357**	.500	.1	.4	.4	.0	2.1
2020–21	Houston	5	**2**	**30.6**	**.485**	.333	**1.000**	**3.6**	**5.0**	**1.8**	**1.2**	**16.4**
Career		39	2	10.5	.314	.388	.750	1.0	.9	.5	.3	4.1

==== Playoffs ====
Year	Team	GP	GS	MPG	FG%	3P%	FT%	RPG	APG	SPG	BPG	PPG
2018–19	Detroit	3	0	5.0	.500	.250	1.000	.7	.0	.7	.0	4.7
Career		3	0	5.0	.500	.250	1.000	.7	.0	.7	.0	4.7

=== EuroLeague ===
Year	Team	GP	GS	MPG	FG%	3P%	FT%	RPG	APG	SPG	BPG	PPG	PIR
2021–22	Maccabi Tel Aviv	13	2	16.0	.341	.286	1.000	2.2	0.8	0.6	0.3	3.5	2.7

=== College ===
Year	Team	GP	GS	MPG	FG%	3P%	FT%	RPG	APG	SPG	BPG	PPG
2015–16	Creighton	34	28	18.6	.471	**.418**	.521	3.7	1.4	1.0	.1	6.2
2016–17	Creighton	**35**	**34**	31.2	.505	.393	.766	**5.8**	**3.3**	1.5	**.4**	12.3
2017–18	Creighton	33	33	**31.7**	**.538**	.411	**.788**	4.4	2.8	**1.7**	.2	**15.1**
Career		102	95	27.2	.511	.406	.719	4.6	2.5	1.4	.3	11.2
