= Davion Mintz =

American basketball player (born 1998)

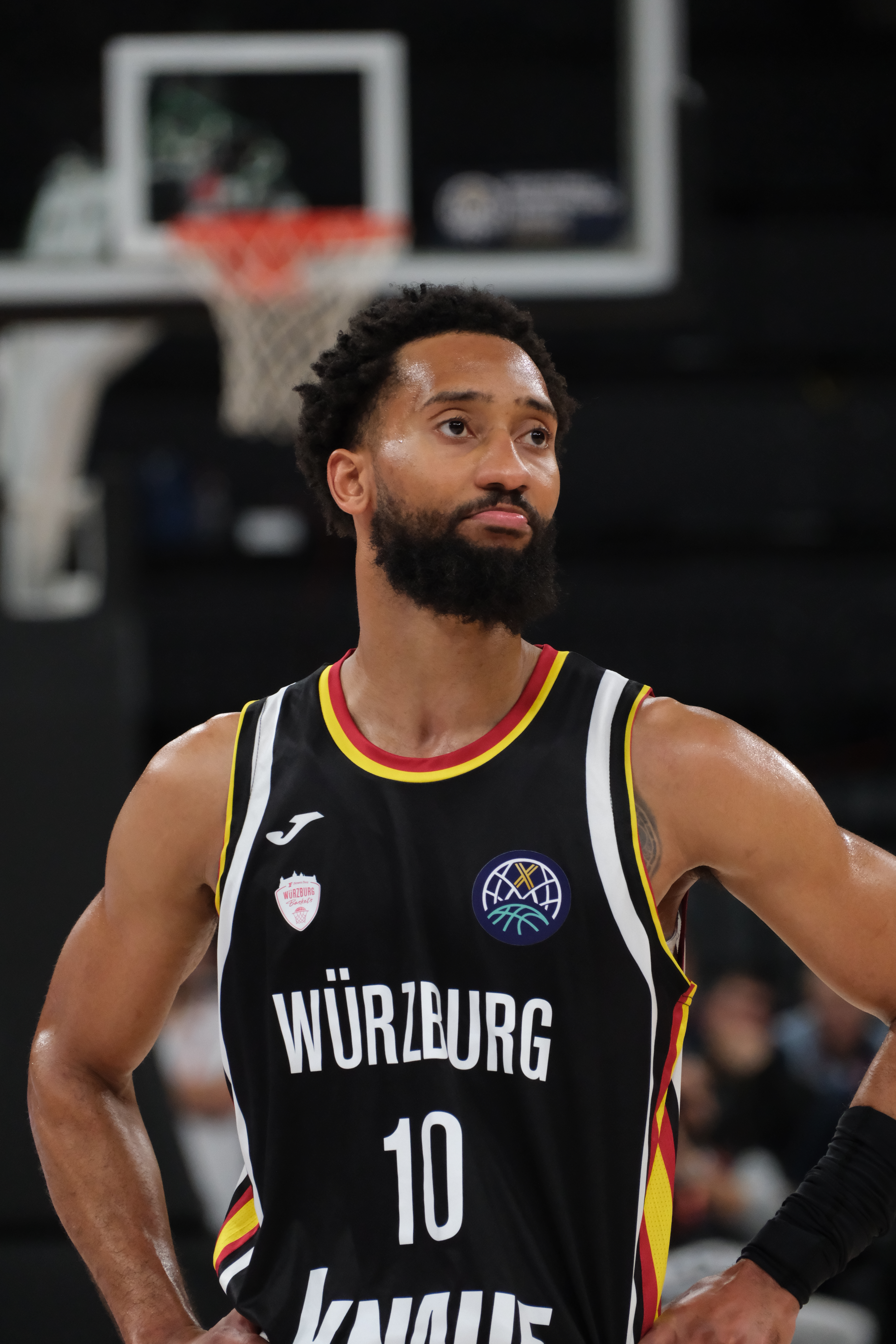
- Mintz with Würzburg in 2025

No. 6 – Dubai Basketball
- Position: Shooting Guard
- League: ABA League; EuroLeague

Personal information
- Born: June 30, 1998 (age 28) Gastonia, North Carolina, U.S.
- Listed height: 6 ft 4 in (1.93 m)
- Listed weight: 195 lb (88 kg)

Career information
- High school: North Mecklenburg (Huntersville, North Carolina)
- College: Creighton (2016–2019); Kentucky (2020–2022)
- NBA draft: 2022: undrafted
- Playing career: 2022–present

Career history
- 2022–2024: Capital City Go-Go
- 2024: Metros de Santiago
- 2024–2025: Oostende
- 2025–2026: Würzburg
- 2026–present: Dubai Basketball
- Stats at NBA.com
- Stats at Basketball Reference

Davion Dee Lee O'Neal Mintz (born June 30, 1998) is an American professional basketball player for Dubai Basketball of the ABA League and the EuroLeague. He played college basketball for the Kentucky Wildcats and the Creighton Bluejays.

== High school career ==
Mintz attended North Mecklenburg High School. He averaged 12.3 points and 2.8 assists per game as a junior, playing alongside future NC State player C. J. Bryce. As a senior, he averaged 20.7 points, 6.9 assists, 5.4 rebounds and 1.9 steals per game. Mintz led the team to a 27–3 record and earned District 9 player of the year honors from the North Carolina Basketball Coaches Association. In one playoff game, he scored 43 points. In addition to his athletic achievements, Mintz was named North Mecklenburg's Student of the Year in the Class of 2016. Considered a three-star recruit, he committed to Creighton in October 2015, choosing the Bluejays over Tulsa and Kansas State.

== College career ==
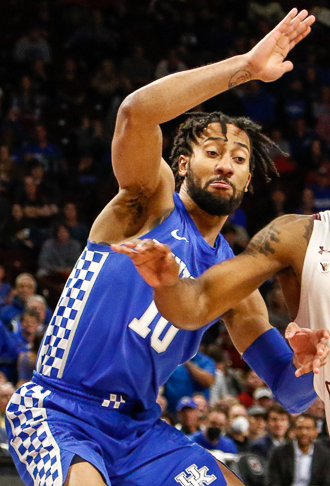
Mintz with Kentucky in 2022

Mintz averaged 3.3 points and 1.8 assists per game as a freshman and became the starting point guard midway through the season. As a sophomore, Mintz averaged 6.1 points and 3.1 assists per game. He averaged 9.7 points, 3 assists and 3 rebounds per game as a junior. Mintz suffered a high ankle sprain in the preseason, and announced in December 2019 that he planned to take a redshirt year. He opted to transfer to Kentucky for his graduate season. Mintz primarily played shooting guard but moved to point guard for his final three games, during which he averaged 15.3 points and 7.7 assists per game. As a graduate student, Mintz led Kentucky in scoring and assists with 11.5 points and 3.1 assists per game, while also averaging 3.2 rebounds per game. Following the season, he declared for the 2021 NBA draft, but ultimately returned to Kentucky for his sixth season of eligibility, granted due to the COVID-19 pandemic. Mintz averaged 8.5 points, 2.2 rebounds, and 1.8 assists per game.

== Professional career ==
=== Capital City Go-Go (2022–2024) ===
After going undrafted in the 2022 NBA draft, Mintz signed an Exhibit 10 deal with the Washington Wizards. He was subsequently waived during training camp. On November 4, 2022, Mintz was named to the opening night roster for the Capital City Go-Go.

=== Metros de Santiago (2024) ===
On May 22, 2024, Mintz signed with the Metros de Santiago of the Liga Nacional de Baloncesto.

=== Oostende (2024–2025) ===
On August 12, 2024, Mintz signed with Filou Oostende of the BNXT League.

=== Würzburg (2025–2026) ===
On February 21, 2025, he signed with Würzburg Baskets of the Basketball Bundesliga (BBL).

=== Dubai Basketball (2026–present) ===
On July 18, 2026, Mintz signed with Dubai Basketball of the ABA League and the EuroLeague.

== Career statistics ==
Legend
GP	Games played	GS	Games started	MPG	Minutes per game
FG%	Field goal percentage	3P%	3-point field goal percentage	FT%	Free throw percentage
RPG	Rebounds per game	APG	Assists per game	SPG	Steals per game
BPG	Blocks per game	PPG	Points per game	**Bold**	Career high

=== College ===
Year	Team	GP	GS	MPG	FG%	3P%	FT%	RPG	APG	SPG	BPG	PPG
2016–17	Creighton	29	12	12.2	.385	.360	**.788**	1.1	1.8	.5	.1	3.3
2017–18	Creighton	33	32	21.1	.404	.352	.732	**3.2**	**3.1**	.4	.1	6.1
2018–19	Creighton	**35**	**35**	28.9	**.416**	.347	.723	3.0	3.0	**1.1**	.1	9.7
2019–20	Creighton	Redshirt										
2020–21	Kentucky	25	21	**30.8**	.397	**.378**	.656	**3.2**	**3.1**	1.0	**.2**	**11.5**
2021–22	Kentucky	31	6	24.7	.382	.344	.701	2.2	1.8	0.6	.1	8.5
Career		153	106	23.5	.401	.356	.72	2.5	2.5	.7	.1	7.8

== Personal life ==
Mintz's godfather is former NFL player Randy Moss.
