= Abdulla Saeed Juma Al Naboodah =

Emirati businessman

- Abdulla Saeed Juma Al Naboodah
- Born: September 1976 (age 49); Dubai, UAE

Abdulla Saeed Juma Al Naboodah is an Emirati businessman who is the Non-Executive Director of The European Tour Group, Founder and Chairman of Dubai Basketball and a shareholder in the Al Naboodah Group, a UAE-based family conglomerate with operations across multiple industries.

== Career ==
In 2007, Abdulla Saeed Juma Al Naboodah founded Phoenix Capital, a private investment firm.

Al Naboodah has been involved in sports administration. In 2010, he was appointed Chairman of Al Ahli Football Club (now Shabab Al Ahli Club) by Sheikh Hamdan bin Mohammed bin Rashid Al Maktoum.

In 2024, he established Dubai Basketball, the first professional basketball team based in Dubai, which became the first Emirati team to compete in the ABA League. Dubai Basketball secured a five‑year wild‑card entry into the expanded 20‑team EuroLeague for the 2025–26 season, marking the first time a UAE‑based team has joined Europe's top-tier professional basketball competition.

He has also contributed to golf development in the UAE, serving as vice chairman of the Emirates Golf Federation from 2010 to 2016 and as a non-executive director of the European Tour Group (DP World Tour) in 2023.

Al Naboodah previously served as the Chairman of Al Naboodah Investments and as an Executive Board Member of the Saeed & Mohammed Al Naboodah Group.

Al Naboodah has held board positions in organizations, including Commercial Bank of Dubai, Al Rawabi, Oman Insurance, Takaful Insurance, Dubai Sports Council and the United Arab Emirates Football Association.
