= Maurice Watson =

American basketball player (born 1993)

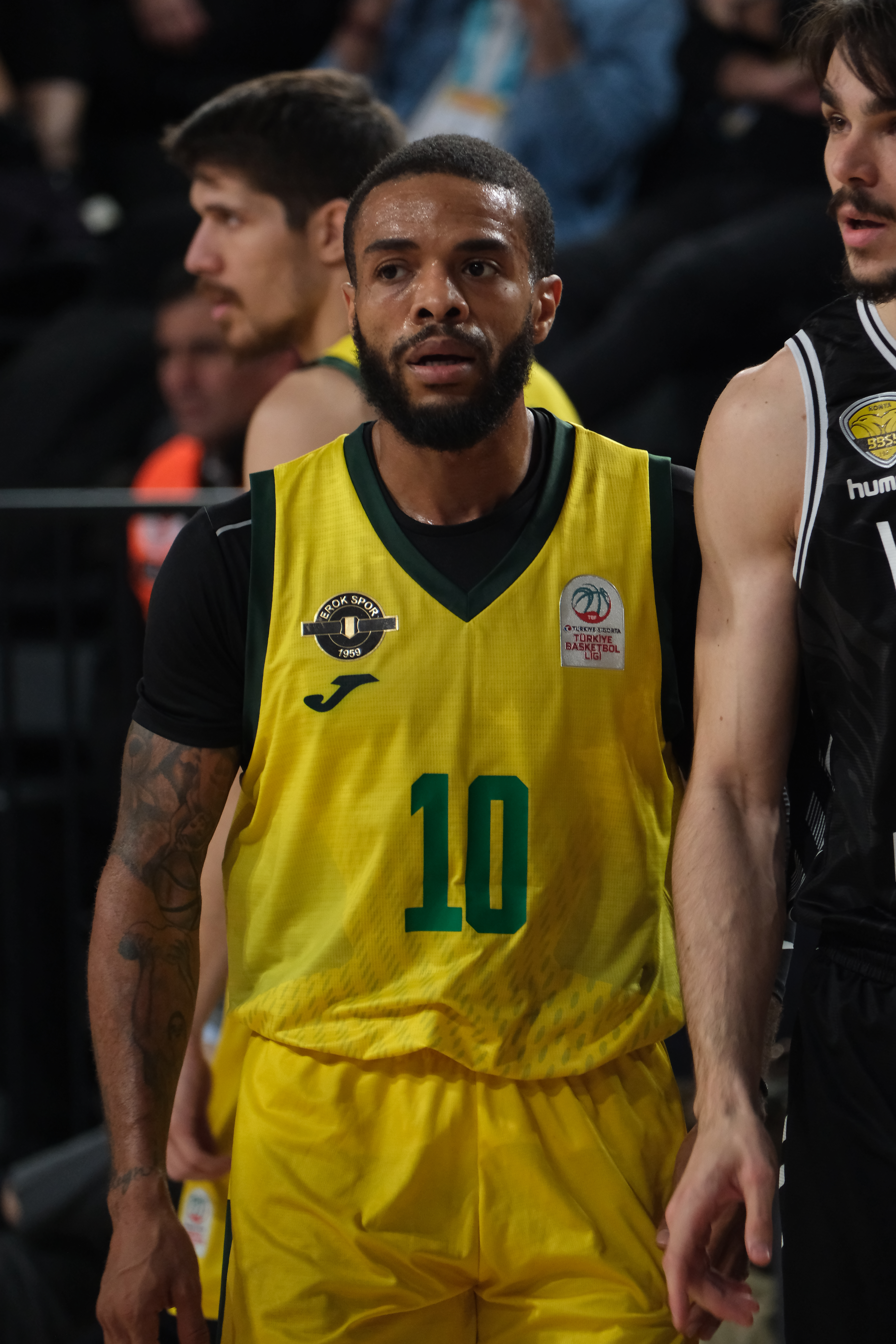

Free agent
- Position: Point guard

Personal information
- Born: March 8, 1993 (age 33) Philadelphia, Pennsylvania, U.S.
- Listed height: 5 ft 11 in (1.80 m)
- Listed weight: 175 lb (79 kg)

Career information
- High school: Boys' Latin (Philadelphia, Pennsylvania)
- College: Boston University (2012–2014); Creighton (2015–2017)
- NBA draft: 2017: undrafted
- Playing career: 2018–present

Career history
- 2018–2019: ZZ Leiden
- 2019–2020: Forlì 2.015
- 2020–2021: Budo Gemlik
- 2021: Twarde Pierniki Toruń
- 2021–2022: Maccabi Rishon LeZion
- 2022: Antwerp Giants
- 2022–2023: CSO Voluntari
- 2023–2024: Gaziantep Basketbol
- 2024–2025: Gaziantep Basketbol
- 2025-2026: Miasto Szkła Krosno

Career highlights
- FIBA Europe Cup assists leader (2019); All-DBL Team (2019); Dutch Cup champion (2019); DBL assists leader (2019); Second-team All-Big East (2016); First-team All-Patriot League (2014); Third-team All-America East (2013); First-team Parade All-American (2012)

Maurice "Mo" Watson Jr. (born March 8, 1993) is an American basketball player who last played for Miasto Szkła Krosno of the Polish Basketball League (PLK). Standing at 5 feet 11 inches (1.80 m), Watson Jr. plays as point guard. He played college basketball for both Boston University and Creighton.

== High school career ==
Watson played for Boys' Latin of Philadelphia Charter School from 2008 to 2012, where he was a four-year starter. He led the team to the Philadelphia Public League title game in his senior year, and to a semi-final loss in the Pennsylvania 4A Boys Basketball Tournament. He remains the all-time scoring leader at Boys’ Latin, as he passed Wilt Chamberlain to post a career total of 2,356 points, second in Philadelphia Public League history. In addition to many local honors, he was a Parade All-American.

== College career ==
Watson Jr. played for Boston University in his first college season, 2012–2013. Here, he averaged 11.2 points, 5.4 assists and 1.7 steals per game in his freshman season. In 2014, he transferred to Creighton where he had a redshirt season. In his second season with Creighton, Watson Jr. averaged 14.1 points and 6.5 assists. In the 2016–2017 season, Watson Jr. suffered from a torn ACL which kept him out for the remainder of the season after playing just 19 games.

=== College statistics ===
Year	Team	GP	GS	MPG	FG%	3P%	FT%	RPG	APG	SPG	BPG	PPG
2012–13	Boston University	30	30	29.5	.463	.329	.750	3.3	5.4	1.7	0	11.2
2013–14	Boston University	35	33	31.2	.495	.337	.628	3.6	7.1	2.1	0	13.3
2015–16	Creighton	35	34	31.4	.475	.297	.714	3.4	6.5	1	0	14.1
2016–17	Creighton	19	19	29.9	.508	.469	.692	2.6	8.5	1.5	0	12.9
Career		119	116	30.6	.484	.341	.698	3.3	6.7	1.6	0	12.9

== Professional career ==
On July 27, 2018, Watson Jr. signed his first professional contract with ZZ Leiden of the Dutch Basketball League (DBL). On November 10, Watson scored a DBL season-high 22 points in an 82–87 loss to Landstede. On March 31, Watson won the NBB Cup with Leiden. He scored 17 points in the cup final. Watson finished the season as league leader in assists and was subsequently named a member of the All-DBL Team.

On July 20, 2019, Watson signed with Forlì 2.015 of the Italian Serie A2 Basket.

Watson spent the 2020–21 season in Turkey with Budo Gemlik and averaged 19.4 points, 4.7 rebounds, 8.9 assists and 2.1 steals per game.

On August 7, 2021, he signed with Twarde Pierniki Toruń of the Polish Basketball League. In 12 games, Watson averaged 17.6 points, 10.9 assists, 4.7 rebounds and 1.9 steals per game.

On November 29, 2021, he signed with Maccabi Rishon LeZion of the Israeli Basketball Premier League.

On July 8, 2022, he has signed with Telent Antwerp Giants of the BNXT League.

On July 23, 2023, he signed with Gaziantep Basketbol of the Turkish Basketball First League (TBL).

On October 13, 2025, he signed with Miasto Szkła Krosno of the Polish Basketball League (PLK).

== Personal life ==
In February 2017, Watson was accused of sexual assault by a 19-year-old female student. The charges against him were dropped in September after his accuser's credibility was suspect, but he pled no contest to a different assault charge.
