= 2015–16 Georgetown Hoyas men's basketball team =

American college basketball season

2015–16 Georgetown Hoyas men's basketball
- Conference: Big East
- Record: 15–18 (7–11 Big East)
- Head coach: John Thompson III (12th season)
- Assistant coaches: Kevin Broadus (7th season); Tavaras Hardy (3rd season); Kevin Sutton (3rd season)
- Captains: D'Vauntes Smith-Rivera; Bradley Hayes
- Home arena: Verizon Center

2015–16 Big East men's basketball standings
	Conf.				Overall
Team	W		L	PCT	W		L	PCT
No. 6 Villanova	16	–	2	.889	35	–	5	.875
No. 9 Xavier	14	–	4	.778	28	–	5	.848
No. 20 Seton Hall †	12	–	6	.667	25	–	9	.735
Providence	10	–	8	.556	24	–	11	.686
Butler	10	–	8	.556	22	–	11	.667
Creighton	9	–	9	.500	20	–	15	.571
Marquette	8	–	10	.444	20	–	13	.606
Georgetown	7	–	11	.389	15	–	18	.455
DePaul	3	–	15	.167	9	–	22	.290
St. John's	1	–	17	.056	8	–	24	.250
† 2016 Big East tournament winner Rankings from AP poll

The 2015–16 Georgetown Hoyas men's basketball team represented Georgetown University in the 2015–16 NCAA Division I men's basketball season. The Hoyas, led by twelfth-year head coach John Thompson III, played their home games at the Verizon Center in Washington, D.C., and were members of the Big East Conference. They finished the season 15–18, 7–11 in Big East play to finish eighth place. They defeated DePaul in the first round of the Big East tournament to advance to the quarterfinals where they lost to Villanova. For the first time in John Thompson III's twelve years as head coach, the Hoyas did not make a postseason tournament.

== Previous season ==
The Hoyas finished the season with an overall record of 22–11, with a record of 12–6 in the Big East regular season for a second-place finish. In the 2015 Big East tournament, the Hoyas were defeated by Xavier, 65–63 in the semifinals. They were invited to the 2015 NCAA Division I men's basketball tournament as a #4 seed, where they defeated Eastern Washington in the second round before losing to Utah in the third round.

== Departures ==
Name	Number	Pos.	Height	Weight	Year	Hometown	Notes
Tyler Adams	10	C	6'9"	254	Senior	Brandon, MS	Graduated
Aaron Bowen	23	F	6'6"	205	Senior	Jacksonville, FL	Graduated
Mikael Hopkins	3	F	6'9"	223	Senior	Hyattsville, MD	Graduated
Joshua Smith	24	C	6'10"	350	Senior	Kent, WA	Graduated
Jabril Trawick	55	G	6'5"	210	Senior	Jenkintown, PA	Graduated

=== Incoming transfers ===
Name	No.	Pos.	Height	Weight	Year	Hometown	Notes
Akoy Agau	22	F	6'8"	230	Sophomore	Omaha, NE	Transferred from Louisville at the start of the second semester during the 2014–15 season. Under NCAA transfer rules, Agau had to sit out for two semesters and was eligible at the start of the second semester during the 2015–16 season. Agau had two and a half years of remaining eligibility.

== Incoming recruits ==
College recruiting
Name	Hometown	School	Height	Weight	Commit date
Jessie Govan; C	Manhasse, NY	Wings Academy	6 ft 10 in (2.08 m)	263 lb (119 kg)	May 13, 2014
Jessie Govan; C	Recruit ratings: Scout: Rivals: (85)				
Marcus Derrickson; PF	Wolfeboro, NH	Brewster Academy	6 ft 8 in (2.03 m)	250 lb (110 kg)	Oct 26, 2013
Marcus Derrickson; PF	Recruit ratings: Scout: Rivals: (82)				
Kaleb Johnson; SF	Martinsville, VA	Carlisle School	6 ft 6 in (1.98 m)	185 lb (84 kg)	Jan 28, 2015
Kaleb Johnson; SF	Recruit ratings: Scout: Rivals: (81)				
Overall recruit ranking:
Note: In many cases, Scout, Rivals, 247Sports, On3, and ESPN may conflict in their listings of height and weight.; In these cases, the average was taken. ESPN grades are on a 100-point scale.; Sources: "2015 Team Ranking". Rivals.

== Season recap ==
Georgetown had lost five players to graduation since the conclusion of the previous season. Most notably, center Joshua Smith, one of the team′s top scorers for the past two seasons and an important presence in Georgetown′s inside game during his abbreviated one-and-a-half-season career with the Hoyas, was gone. The graduation of Mikael Hopkins and Aaron Bowen meant the loss of two veteran forwards, while that of Jabril Trawick left the Hoyas shorthanded at guard. Also gone was guard David Allen who, after three seasons as a walk-on, did not return to the team for his senior year, as well as center Tyler Adams, an inspiration to the team from the sidelines during his Georgetown years but limited by heart arrhythmia to only five games in his four seasons at Georgetown.

Five sophomores – guard Tre Campbell, small forward L. J. Peak, and forwards Isaac Copeland, Paul White, and Trey Mourning – returned for 2015–16, as did the team's only junior, power forward Reggie Cameron, and senior center Bradley Hayes. Senior guard Riyan Williams, the son of former Georgetown great Reggie Williams, also made the team as a walk-on for the third straight season. The most significant returnee was guard D'Vauntes Smith-Rivera, the team's top scorer for two straight seasons. After the conclusion of the previous season, Georgetown had announced that Smith-Rivera had decided to forego his senior year of college and enter the 2015 National Basketball Association draft, a sudden move that surprised observers, who had not ranked him highly as a National Basketball Association prospect. Smith-Rivera did not hire an agent, however, and, with his final year of college eligibility therefore intact, he decided a week later to withdraw his name from the draft pool and return to Georgetown for his senior year. Speaking publicly about his decision three weeks after that, Smith-Rivera had explained that he initially had decided to enter the NBA draft out of an abundance of confidence in himself and comfort with his abilities as a player, but that his parents had convinced him that returning to Georgetown and completing his education was a wiser choice.

Freshmen who arrived for the season were center Jesse Govan, power forward Marcus Derrickson, and small forward Kaleb Johnson. Another newcomer was redshirt sophomore forward Akoy Agau. After seeing little action in three semesters at Louisville, Agau had transferred to Georgetown in January 2015. NCAA rules required him to sit out two full semesters before beginning play at Georgetown, but the Hoyas hoped that once Agau joined the team at mid-season in January 2016, he would help fill the gap left by the graduation of Hoya "big men" Joshua Smith and Mikael Hopkins, whose departure left the team weaker on inside offense, defense, and rebounding.

Smith-Rivera′s decision to return for his senior year caused expectations for the 2015-16 Georgetown squad to soar. Although he was a shooting guard rather than a natural point guard, many observers thought that with him back to lead the team at point guard and with many other players also returning from the previous season, the Hoyas would have another successful season. They were projected as a Top 25 team that would finish second in the Big East and return to the NCAA Tournament for the second straight year.

=== Italy trip ===
Under NCAA rules, the Hoyas were allowed to make an overseas preseason trip to play exhibition games against foreign teams once every four years. Four years earlier, in August 2011, the Hoyas visited China to play three games against Chinese teams and one against a team from Taiwan, and during their second game had become involved in an ugly brawl with a Chinese professional team and Chinese fans in the stands, which resulted in John Thompson III pulling his team off the court and the game never being completed. In August 2015, Georgetown made another overseas trip, this time a 10-day visit to Italy. None of the players on the 2015–2016 team had been on the 2011–2012 team that visited China, but they were aware of the fight in China and hoped for a more peaceful and less controversial experience this time. Before the team left for the trip, Thompson told the press that he intended to use the exhibition schedule to give his players experience, and with that in mind, he would not necessarily play each game to win. The Hoyas played two games in Rome – against a team from Iceland and an Italian all-star team – and won both. After a stop in Pisa, they then traveled to Florence, where they lost to a team from Lithuania. Their final stop was Milan, from which they made a short drive across the border into Switzerland to defeat a Swiss team in a game played in Lugano, finishing their trip with a record of 3–1. Bradley Hayes made the trip but did not play because he was recovering from thumb surgery.

As the oldest Jesuit university in the United States, Georgetown had hoped that the team would be granted an audience with Pope Francis at the Vatican, but this proved impossible to arrange. However, the trip to Italy went far more smoothly than the 2011 visit to China, and the Hoyas took breaks from play to visit the Colosseum, the Roman Forum, Trevi Fountain, the Pantheon, the Altare della Patria, the Spanish Steps, St. Peter’s Basilica, the Sistine Chapel, and the Leaning Tower of Pisa.

=== Nonconference schedule ===
In late October 2015, only about three weeks before the 2015–2016 season began, Georgetown announced that Akoy Agau had suffered a knee injury that would force him to miss the entire season. His Georgetown debut thus was postponed until the following year. The loss of Agau was a blow to Georgetown, which now faced unexpected weakness in its inside game, but it did little to dampen the overall enthusiasm for the team′s prospects for success, even though Paul White, the team′s leading scorer off the bench the previous year, began the season sidelined by a hip injury.

In November, Georgetown began its season by participating in the 2K Sports Classic, an annual tournament. The tournament′s format required the Hoyas to play a non-bracketed game at home against a mid-major opponent, then join three other major-conference schools in a bracketed tournament at Madison Square Garden to determine the tournament champion, and finally play a final, non-bracketed game at home against another mid-major team. For their opening mid-major opponent, the Hoyas faced Radford at the Verizon Center, and the Highlanders shocked the Hoyas by dealing them a double-overtime 82–80 loss, with Radford senior guard Rashaun Davis scoring a game-high and career-high 28 points. For Georgetown, Bradley Hayes had a double-double with 19 points and 12 rebounds, both career highs, while D'Vauntes Smith-Rivera scored 15 points, Isaac Copeland added 11, and Jesse Govan came off the bench to score 11.

Before departing for the championship portion of the tournament in New York City, Georgetown stepped away from the 2K Sports Classic to take part in the annual Gavitt Tipoff Games, a new series of eight games per year between teams of the Big East Conference and Big Ten Conference. This season, Georgetown′s Big Ten opponent was No. 3 Maryland, which the Hoyas met before a sellout crowd at the Xfinity Center on the University of Maryland campus. The game renewed the series between the two schools, which had been long-time cross-town rivals, but since 1979 relations had soured between them and they since had met in a non-tournament game only once, in 1993. The Gavitt Tipoff Game also was their first meeting in the Washington, D.C., area since the 1993 game. The first half saw six lead changes and four ties, and the game was tied 33–33 at halftime. In the second half the Hoyas had pulled out to a 44–37 lead when the officials called D'Vauntes Smith-Rivera for his fourth foul, forcing him to go to the bench with 14 minutes left to play. Maryland steadily reduced the Hoyas′ lead to 55–54, but Isaac Copeland scored on a lay-up and a three-pointer to give Georgetown a 61–54 lead with 5:41 remaining. The Terrapins then scored seven unanswered points to tie the game at 61–61. Terrapin senior guard Rasheed Sulaimon hit a decisive three-pointer, his only basket of the second half, to break a 68–68 tie with 1:18 remaining. Maryland sophomore guard Melo Trimble sank two free throws with 12 seconds left to stretch Maryland′s lead to five points, and the Terrapins hung on to win 75–71 and take a 37–27 lead in the all-time series between the teams. Maryland took 32 free throws during the game compared with 12 for Georgetown, The Georgetown starters had a balanced attack, with Bradley Hayes scoring a team-high 16 points and grabbing eight rebounds, Smith-Rivera adding 14 points, Copeland and Marcus Derrickson each contributing 13 points, and L. J. Peak scoring 12, but Jesse Govan, who fouled out with three points, was the only Georgetown bench player to score in the game. Georgetown opened with an 0–2 record for the first time since the 1998-1999 season.

Three days later, the Hoyas were at Madison Square Garden and back in action in the 2K Sports Classic, seeking to avoid the first 0–3 start in Georgetown men's basketball history as they opened competition in the bracketed portion of the tournament with a game in the semifinal round. Georgetown met Wisconsin, which had defeated the Hoyas in their meeting in the Battle 4 Atlantis tournament the previous season. This year Wisconsin had a young team with eight freshman on the roster, and this time it was the Hoyas who prevailed over the Badgers, holding them to 1-for-10 (10 percent) three-point shooting in the first half and 5-for-19 (26.3 percent) from beyond the arc for the game; overall, the Badgers made only one of their first 13 field-goal attempts and shot 31.7 percent from the field. Meanwhile, the Hoyas, who entered the game shooting 36.6 percent in three-pointers, made 50 percent of their three-point attempts against Wisconsin on 9-for-18 shooting. Isaac Copeland led the Hoyas with 15 points, all scored in the second half, and D'Vauntes Smith-Rivera, who shot 1-for-7 from the field in the first half, recovered to finish with 12 points. Reggie Cameron and Jesse Govan both came off the bench to score in double figures, Cameron with a career-high 14 points – all in the first half – on 4-for-6 three-point shooting and Govan with 13 points. Georgetown led by as many as 14 points and came away with its first victory of the season, 71–61.

The Hoyas advanced to the 2K Sports Classic championship game, held two days later, to meet their second Top 5 opponent in six days, No. 5 Duke, which had defeated VCU in the semifinals. It was only the second time in history, and the first time since the 1989 NCAA tournament, that Georgetown and Duke met at a neutral site. Georgetown led 47–42 at halftime. The Blue Devils took the lead early in the second half, but the Hoyas moved ahead 54–53 on an L. J. Peak dunk with 17:10 left to play. Duke responded with a 10–0 run that gave the Blue Devils a 63–54 lead. The Hoyas closed the gap again, reducing Duke′s advantage to 70–69, but a Duke 7–0 run put the Blue Devils ahead 77–69 with 2:46 left in the game. Again the Hoyas closed, and a three-pointer by Isaac Copeland reduced Duke′s lead to 86–84 with seven seconds left. Georgetown had one final chance to tie or win after Blue Devils freshman guard Derryck Thornton missed two free throws, but Copeland′s three-pointer at the buzzer fell short and Duke won the game 86–84 to take the tournament championship. Duke sophomore guard Grayson Allen scored a career-high 32 points against the Hoyas on 9-for-12 shooting from the field, 5-for-6 in three-pointers, and 9-for-9 in free throws, along with five rebounds, four assists, and two steals. Georgetown shot 55 percent from the field, but Duke outrebounded the Hoyas 31–27 and held the advantage in scoring from the free throw line, going 28-for-36 in free throws compared to Georgetown′s 19-for-24. For Georgetown, Copeland led the team with 21 points, D'Vauntes Smith-Rivera added 14, and Kaleb Johnson also scored 14, coming off the bench to score in double figures for the first time in his college career. L. J. Peak contributed 13 points. The Hoyas settled for second place in the 2K Sports Classuc and the loss left Georgetown with its first 1–3 start since the 1971-1972 team opened 1–3 on the way to a 3–23 season.

Georgetown returned to the Verizon Center for a seven-game homestand. The first game of the homestand completed the Hoyas′ participation in the 2K Sports Classic with a non-bracketed game against Bryant, an easy win – giving Georgetown a 2–3 record to start a season for the first time since 1999-2000 – in which L. J. Peak scored 20 points, Isaac Copeland 12, Marcus Derrickson 11, and Bradley Hayes 10, and Paul White made his season debut after missing the first four games with a hip injury. Another easy home win followed against Maryland Eastern Shore in which D'Vauntes Smith-Rivera scored 30 points and moved into 16th place all time in scoring for Georgetown with 1,480 career points, while Hayes had 11 points and nine rebounds. The Hoyas evened their record at 3–3.

A driving force in the success of the original Big East Conference of 1979–2013 during its 34 seasons of play was Georgetown′s rivalry with Syracuse, but play between the teams had come to an end after the conclusion of the 2012-13 season when the conference broke up during the summer of 2013. The original conference survived as the American Athletic Conference (marketed as "the American"), but Georgetown and Syracuse left it, the Hoyas to become a charter member of the new Big East Conference and the Orange to join the Atlantic Coast Conference, and they had gone two seasons without meeting. To renew the rivalry, the schools agreed to a home-and-home series in which Georgetown hosted Syracuse this season and would visit Syracuse the next season, with the hope that the teams would continue to meet annually after that. As a result, Georgetown's homestand continued with its first meeting with Syracuse since 2013. The No. 14 Orange were the Hoyas′ third ranked opponent of the season, and they arrived at the Verizon Center on December 5 with a record of 6–1, having lost their first game of the year to Wisconsin three days earlier. Syracuse head coach Jim Boeheim, who had coached the Orange throughout the original Big East′s run, was not present, however, as he began serving a nine-game NCAA suspension that day because of various NCAA rules violations, and assistant coach Mike Hopkins led the Orange. The Hoyas took a 36–24 lead at the half, and started the second half with an 11–2 run to pull ahead 47–26. The Orange battled back, closing to a six-point deficit in the last minute of the game, but the Hoyas held on for a 79–72 upset victory, their fifth defeat of Syracuse in the last seven meetings between the schools, and their first win of the season over a ranked opponent. Bradley Hayes scored a career-high 21 points along with eight rebounds, while Isaac Copeland finished with 14 points, Marcus Derrickson finished with his first career double-double (13 points and 10 rebounds), and D'Vauntes Smith-Rivera added 11 points. For the first time in the 2015–2016 season, Georgetown had a winning record, at 4–3.

The Hoyas followed up their upset of Syracuse by stretching their winning streak to five with two more wins. They had an easy victory over Brown, in which Paul White had what turned out to be his best game of the season with four points and four rebounds, then made their second consecutive appearance in the annual BB&T Classic and staved off a late-game 19–3 scoring run by UNC Wilmington to deal the Seahawks their first loss of the season. Georgetown′s record improved to 6–3, but two surprising losses ensued to close the homestand. First, Monmouth shocked Georgetown in a 15-point upset, shooting 50 percent from three-point range, outrebounding the Hoyas, and never trailing after conceding the opening basket to Georgetown; it was the first time Monmouth had ever beaten a Big East opponent. Four days later, UNC Asheville upset Georgetown for its fifth straight win. D'Vauntes Smith-Rivera scored 12 points against Brown, 29 against UNC Wilmington, and 18 against Monmouth, and Bradley Hayes had double-doubles against Brown (12 points and 11 rebounds) and UNC Asheville (11 points and a career-high 18 rebounds), also recording six assists in the UNC Asheville game and grabbing 11 rebounds in the loss to Monmouth. L. J. Peak finished with 13 points in the Brown game and 10 against UNC Asheville. while Isaac Copeland scored 16 against Monmouth, 12 against UNC Asheville, and 10 in the UNC Wilmington game. Marcus Derrickson scored 15 points against UNC Wilmington, Kaleb Johnson scored a career-high 16 points against UNC Asheville, and Jesse Govan had 14 in the Monmouth game.

The Hoyas completed their non-conference schedule with a visit to Charlotte, and held on to beat the 49ers in a close game, with Isaac Copeland scoring 12 points, D'Vauntes Smith-Rivera adding 11, and L. J. Peak, Reggie Cameron, and Marcus Derrickson contributing 10 each. Paul White reaggravated his hip injury during the game, and it turned out to be his last one as a Hoya, as he soon underwent a season-ending abdominal procedure to treat the injury.

The Hoyas entered Big East Conference play with a record of 7–5, two of the losses coming against Top Five teams but the other three in surprising upsets by mid-major opponents. The Hoyas had one win against a ranked team – then-No. 14 Syracuse – to their credit, but when John Thompson III talked to the press about the team′s readiness for the Big East season after the Charlotte game, he said, "Our defense is not close to where it needs to be for us to have success against the toughest basketball conference in the country."

=== Conference schedule ===
On December 30, 2015, the Hoyas opened the Big East season – one of four teams to play on the conference′s opening day – by visiting DePaul, and they defeated the Blue Demons for the 17th time in their past 18 meetings, with D'Vauntes Smith-Rivera and Isaac Copeland scoring 15 points each and L. J. Peak adding 14. A home win against Marquette followed in the first game of 2016, Marcus Derrickson scoring 16 points against the Golden Eagles and Smith-Rivera contributing 15 points and six assists, while Isaac Copeland added 11 and Jesse Govan and L. J. Peak both came off the bench to score in double figures, Govan contributing 11 and Peak 10. They lost their first conference game of the season in a visit to Creighton, going 3-for-7 in free throws while the Bluejays went 21-of-25 from the line but they returned to the Verizon Center to beat DePaul for the 18th time in the past 19 meetings and then won a game at Madison Square Garden against St. John's, whose new coach, Chris Mullin, had been a star player for St. John′s in the heyday of the rivalry between the two schools between 1981 and 1985. It was the eighth straight loss for the Red Storm, the longest losing streak in the 109-year history of the school′s men′s basketball program, and the teams played before the smallest crowd for a game between Georgetown and St. John′s since 2007; Georgetown improved its record in the all-time series against St. John′s to 49–55. Smith-Rivera scored 17 points and had seven assists against Creighton, and scored 17 points in the second game against DePaul. Against St. John's, he equaled a career high with 33 points, the highest point total at that point in the season for a Big East player, on 11-for-16 shooting from the field overall and 5-for-8 from three-point range. L. J. Peak had 17 points in the second DePaul game, while Reggie Cameron scored a career-high 15 points against St. John′s. Off the bench, Jesse Govan scored 17 points and pulled down seven rebounds against Creighton and had 12 points in the second DePaul game, and Tre Campbell came into the St. John′s game to score 12. The Hoyas entered the St. John′s game shooting 74.5 percent from the free throw line and improved on that by shooting 27-of-33 (81.8 percent) from the line against the Red Storm.

Winners of five of their last six games and with an overall record of 11–6 and a conference record of 4–1, the Hoyas returned to Washington to host No. 6 Villanova, winners of 20 straight Big East games since an upset loss to Georgetown at the Verizon Center on January 19, 2015, and Georgetown′s third Top Ten opponent of the season. Before the game, Georgetown held a moment of silence for former Butler center Andrew Smith, who had died of acute lymphoblastic leukemia four days earlier at the age of 26. Villanova led 26–22 at halftime. At one point in the second half, the Wildcats went without a field goal for 5:39, and they only scored one field goal during the final eight minutes of the game. but the Hoyas got in foul trouble and the Wildcats played tough inside defense and made nine of their last 10 free throws. D'Vauntes Smith-Rivera had 15 points in the game, Isaac Copeland added 11, and Reggie Cameron put in 10, but the Hoyas made a number of ball-handling mistakes and shot only 32.7 percent from the field for the game, and Villanova won 55–50.

Three days later, Georgetown faced another major challenge, traveling to meet their third Top Five opponent of the season, No. 5 Xavier, which was undefeated at home and had a potent offense, averaging 80.1 points per game. The Musketeers pulled out to a 27–20 lead in the first half, but the Hoyas then switched to a zone defense, which slowed the Musketeers. Tre Campbell, meanwhile, scored 17 points in the half, and Georgetown held a 39–33 lead at halftime. In the second half, D'Vauntes Smith-Rivera scored 15 points on his way to a 20-point game, and the Hoyas pulled ahead for their first double-digit lead at 46–36. Xavier fought back, outscoring the Hoyas 13–5 to cut the Georgetown lead to 51–49, but then the Hoyas pulled away again to build an 11-point lead, and Xavier never got closer than six points the rest of the way. Georgetown won 81–72, dealing the Musketeers their first home-court loss of the season. Coming into the game, Xavier and Purdue were the only NCAA Division I teams that had not been outrebounded, but the Hoyas outrebounded the Musketeers 39–35. Xavier shot a season-low 35.8 percent from the floor. Campbell went 5-for-6 in three-pointers and scored a career-high 21 points, while L. J. Peak and Jesse Govan came off the bench to score 13 points each.

Georgetown next stepped away from conference play for one game to meet UConn at the Verizon Center. Both teams had been charter members of the original Big East and played each other annually throughout its 34 seasons from 1979 to 2013. When the conference broke up over the summer of 2013, UConn had remained in it as it reinvented itself as the American Athletic Conference, marketed as "the American," while Georgetown left to become a charter member of the new Big East. As a result, the two teams had not met since February 2013, but they had agreed to renew the series by meeting each other in a home-and-home series, with the Hoyas visiting the Huskies this season and the Huskies returning the favor the following year. UConn shot 13-for-26 from the field in the first half, including 5-for-10 from three-point range, and the Huskies led 40–33 at halftime. UConn went cold as the second half began, starting the half shooting 1-for-16 (6.25 percent) from the field and allowing Georgetown to close the gap. By the time the Huskies sank their first field goal of the second half with 12:46 left to play, the Hoyas had cut their lead to 49–46. Georgetown then had an 8–2 scoring run that gave the Hoyas a 54–51 lead with 9:50 remaining. With six minutes left, Georgetown led 60–56, but the Hoyas managed only one more basket for the rest of the game. UConn, meanwhile, shot only 19.1 percent from the field during the second half, but made up for it by sinking free throws, going 20-for-25 from the line after halftime as part of a 29-for-36 effort for the game, while the Hoyas went 7-for-8 from the line for the entire game and only 2-for-3 in the second half. The Hoyas still led, 62–60, with 4:32 to play, but the barrage of Husky free throws took their toll. UConn redshirt junior shooting guard Rodney Purvis stole the ball from Jesse Govan and sank two free throws with 18 seconds left to help seal a 68–62 UConn victory. UConn shot 17-for-47 (36.2 percent) from the field overall, but outrebounded the Hoyas 35–34, scored 15 points off 12 Georgetown turnovers, and outscored the Hoyas 24–18 in the paint. The Hoyas made the largest number of three-point attempts that they had all season but went only 9-for-31 (29.0 percent) from beyond the arc. Reggie Cameron led the Hoyas with 13 points, and D'Vauntes Smith-Rivera and L. J. Peak scored 12 each.

The Hoyas returned to conference play with a come-from-behind victory over Creighton at the Verizon Center in which Smith-Rivera scored a game-high 19 points and Peak added 11. Then they hosted yet another Top Ten team, No. 10 Providence, whose roster included the Big East′s two top scorers, Ben Bentil and Kris Dunn. Both teams wore pink sneakers and uniforms that featured the color pink in a show of support for the Coaches vs. Cancer charity. During the first half, Bentil and Dunn scored 29 points while the entire Georgetown team scored only 28, giving the Friars a 38–28 halftime lead. Although Georgetown made several runs at Providence, the Friars managed to stave off the underdog Hoyas and won the game 73–69. L. J. Peak scored 19 points and D'Vauntes Smith-Rivera had 18, but Bentil and Dunn finished with 26 points each in a dominating performance, and during the game Dunn became the 48th player in Friar men's basketball history to score 1,000 points.

The loss to Providence began a three-game losing steak and marked the beginning of a steep downward spiral for the 2015-2016 Hoya team, which would win only two more games. The Hoyas began February with losses at Butler and at Seton Hall. They broke their losing streak with a victory against St. John′s, dealing the Red Storm their 15th straight loss, but it was Georgetown′s last win of the regular season. D'Vauntes Smith-Rivera scored 21 at Butler and 11 at Seton Hall; against St. John′s, he scored the team′s first eight points on the way to a game-high 24 points which moved him into sixth place all-time among Georgetown scorers, ahead of David Wingate (1,781 points), and also made him the first Hoya player ever to score over 1,000 points in conference games. Peak scored a season-high 22 points against Butler, and came off the bench for 17 points and eight rebounds against Seton Hall and to score 20 points against St. John′s, giving him double figures in seven straight games. Isaac Copeland, who had been mired in a slump in which he had scored only 11 points on 5-of-23 (21.7 percent) shooting from the field in his previous four games combined, scored 11 against Butler, then went on to a team-high 18 points against Seton Hall and a 23-point showing along with eight rebounds against St. John′s. Reggie Cameron scored 12 off the bench against St. John′s, and Bradley Hayes scored 12 against Butler.

On February 11, three days after the Hoyas beat St. John′s, Hayes broke his hand during practice. He underwent successful surgery for the injury on February 13, shortly before the Hoyas met Providence that day, but was lost for the rest of the regular season. At the time of the injury, he was averaging 8.5 points and 6.8 rebounds per game, and his 53.9 shooting percentage from the field was the team′s highest. Jesse Govan stepped in to take over at center, but without Hayes the Hoyas lost an important part of their inside game, forcing them to rely more heavily on Govan and Trey Mourning for perimeter shooting.

Georgetown′s rematch with Providence on the day of Hayes′s surgery took place at the Dunkin' Donuts Center in Providence. The Friars were still ranked, but had dropped to No. 20 in the AP Poll and had lost three straight games. The game saw the Big East′s top three scorers – Providence′s Ben Bentil (entering the game with 26.0 points per game) and Kris Dunn (17.0 per game) and Georgetown′s D'Vauntes Smith-Rivera (16.7 per game) – all on the court at the same time. In the first half, Georgetown shot only 9-for-28 (32.1 percent) from the field and forced only two Providence turnovers; during one stretch midway through the half, Georgetown did not score for seven minutes and turned the ball over five times while Providence scored 11 unanswered points to pull ahead by 20 points. The Hoyas fell behind by as many as 26 points in the first half, and trailed 49–29 at halftime. The Friars′s 49 first-half points were the most they had scored in the first half of a game all season, but the Hoyas chipped away at the Friars′ lead in the second half. Bentil, who scored 16 points, and Dunn, who finished with 20, again were key factors for Providence, combining to score 12 of the Friars′ final 14 points. Despite their efforts, D'Vauntes Smith-Rivera′s only basket of the game, a three-pointer, narrowed Providence′s lead to 70–67 with 2:42 left to play, and a three-pointer by Trey Mourning cut it to 71–70 with 1:08 remaining. Providence redshirt sophomore forward Rodney Bullock, who had a double-double with 23 points and 10 rebounds, hit two free throws to stretch the Friars′ lead to 73–70. Isaac Copeland, fouled on a three-point attempt, made two of his three free throws to bring Georgetown back within one point at 73–72 with 10 seconds left, then Bentil made two free throws to give the Friars a 75–72 lead. Bullock blocked L. J. Peak′s potentially game-tying three-pointer in the game′s closing seconds to preserve a 75–72 Friars victory. Five Hoyas scored in double figures: Marcus Derrickson led the Hoyas with 18 points and nine rebounds, Jesse Govan had 13 points, and Copeland finished with 12, while L. J. Peak came off the bench to score 13 and Trey Mourning had 10 off the bench.

The Hoyas returned to the Verizon Center for a three-game homestand that began with a loss to Seton Hall – Pirates head coach Kevin Willard′s 100th win at Seton Hall – despite seven rebounds and a career-high 27 points by Jesse Govan on 10-of-13 (76.9 percent) shooting from the field, including four three-pointers, and despite D'Vauntes Smith-Rivera and L. J. Peak also scoring in double figures, Smith-Rivera finishing with 18 points and Peak with 10. Next, the Hoyas hosted No. 8 Xavier, their eighth game against a ranked opponent of the season. Xavier jumped out to a double-digit lead during the first half, but the Hoyas battled back to shrink the Musketeers′ lead to 35–33 at halftime. Xavier opened the second half by scoring 13 consecutive points and making 12 of its first 13 shots from the field, and the Musketeers pulled out to a 21-point lead as the game wore on. Xavier shot 54 percent from the field for the game and 77 percent in the second half, and they outrebounded the Hoyas 33–30, giving them a 16–5 advantage in fast-break points. Georgetown had trouble with Xavier′s variant of a 1–3–1 defense, and the Hoyas made 27 of their 61 field goal attempts from three-point range, sinking only 10 of them for a 27 percent three-point-shooting effort. Xavier won 88–70, dealing the Hoyas their sixth loss in seven games and third in a row. Smith-Rivera led the Hoyas with 18 points, Isaac Copeland scored 13 points, and Peak came off the bench for 12. Tre Campbell, meanwhile, was mired in a slump; since scoring his career-high 21 points in the game at Xavier on January 19, he had made only six shots and scored only 18 points in nine games.

The Hoyas completed their last homestand of the year with an overtime loss to Butler, then began March and a final, two-game road-trip with a one-point loss at Marquette. Against Butler, D'Vauntes Smith-Rivera scored a team-high 26 points in the last home game of his career, while Isaac Copeland finished with 17, L. J. Peak came off the bench for 14, and Marcus Derrickson scored 11, while Jesse Govan grabbed 10 rebounds. In the Marquette game, Isaac Copeland scored a career-high 32 points and Smith-Rivera had 16 points, nine rebounds and eight assists, while Derrickson scored 15 and Peak contributed 12 off the bench. With only eight healthy players on the roster, John Thompson III turned to the team′s student manager, sophomore Ra'Mond Hines, adding him to the roster as a walk-on prior to the game at Marquette; a guard, Hines ultimately made only one appearance before the season ended, playing in the last seconds of the Big East tournament game against DePaul.

The struggling Hoyas finished their regular season with a visit to No. 3 Villanova, playing before a sellout crowd at the Wells Fargo Center. The Wildcats dominated the Hoyas, jumping out to a 21-point lead in the first half and leading 46–27 at halftime. L. J. Peak led the Hoyas with 31 points, Marcus Derrickson scored 14, and Isaac Copeland grabbed 13 rebounds, but the Hoyas shot only 4-for-26 (15.4 percent) from three-point range. and the Wildcats won 84–71. Villanova improved its record in the all-time series with Georgetown to 33–44, and Georgetown′s record against Top 25 teams during John Thompson III′s 12-year tenure fell to 45–52.

The Hoyas finished the regular season with an overall record of 14–17, the first regular-season losing record of John Thompson III's 12-year tenure as head coach and the first since the 2003-2004 season. Their conference record of 7–11 and eighth-place finish in the Big East were their worst final conference record since a 7–11 finish in the 2008–2009 season and lowest position in the final conference standings since an 11th-place finish in the original Big East in 2008–2009. They had lost six games in a row to finish the regular season – their longest losing streak since they lost the final nine games of the 2003–2004 season – as well as nine of their last 10, and 10 of their last 12. They had played seven games against ranked opponents and won only two of them. After the final loss to Villanova, John Thompson III told the press that 2015–2016 had been the most challenging season of his career "By far. By far...Not close."

=== Big East tournament ===
With a No. 8 seed in the 2016 Big East tournament at Madison Square Garden, Georgetown faced ninth-seeded DePaul in the first round. Former Georgetown head coach John Thompson Jr., and former Georgetown great Patrick Ewing, both members of the Naismith Memorial Basketball Hall of Fame, attended the game, seated behind Georgetown′s bench. Bradley Hayes, who missed the last six games of the regular season with a broken hand, returned to play, and his presence bolstered the Hoyas′ defense. The Hoyas shot 50 percent (12-for-24) from the field during the first half, while the Blue Demons shot only 31 percent (9-for-29), and Georgetown finished the half with an 8–0 scoring run – almost 10–0, but the officials ruled that Kaleb Johnson′s layup at the buzzer was too late to count – that gave the Hoyas a 35–24 lead at halftime. In the second half, the Hoyas had a 16–2 scoring run – including 11 by D'Vauntes Smith Rivera, who scored 15 points after halftime – to pull 18 points ahead for the first time at 55–37 with 8:56 left in the game. Georgetown snapped its six-game losing streak and won 70–53, its first victory in nearly 4 1/2 weeks, while DePaul lost its fourth game in a row, for the eighth time in its last nine Big East tournament games, and for the 19th time in the last 20 games against Georgetown. For the game, DePaul shot 37.9 percent (22-for-58) from the field, while the Hoyas shot 50 percent (23-for-46). Smith-Rivera – who entered the game fifth in scoring in the Big East with 16.3 points per game and was the only Big East player to be in the top ten in seven statistical categories – scored 20 points, Hayes had 10, and L. J. Peak came off the bench to add 10 points.

In the quarterfinals, about 15 hours after defeating DePaul, Georgetown faced the tournament′s top-seeded team and defending champion, No. 3 Villanova, which had received a bye in the first round. Villanova had beaten Georgetown in both regular-season games they played, and the Big East tournament game was their second meeting in five days. During the first half, the officials allowed the teams to play a physical game reminiscent of the original Big East in its 1980s heyday, and there were only eight fouls called and no free throws during the half. The Hoyas held Villanova to 40.7 percent shooting from the field overall in the first half, but during the half allowed the Wildcats to shoot 50 percent in three-pointers. With Georgetown leading 27–25, both teams had a scoring drought late in the first half that lasted nearly five minutes – including three minutes while D'Vauntes Smith-Rivera was on the bench after being poked in the eye – until Wildcat junior forward Kris Jenkins finally broke it by sinking a three-pointer with eight seconds left in the half to give Villanova a 28–27 halftime lead. Georgetown opened the second half with a 9–4 scoring run that gave the Hoyas a 37–31 lead. Halfway through the second half, Georgetown still led, 47–46, but the Wildcats then went on a decisive 14–1 scoring run. Villanova took the lead for good with just over 10 minutes left in the game, and led 60–48 with 7 1/2 minutes to play. In contrast to the opening half, the second half saw 27 fouls called and 37 free throws. The Hoyas outrebounded the Wildcats 25–12 and had 16 offensive rebounds to the Wildcats′ four but scored only 12 second-chance points, while Villanova shot 13-for-21 (61.9 percent) from three-point range, scored 20 points off 11 Georgetown turnovers, and took all 25 of its free throws in the second half as the Wildcats began drawing fouls from the Hoyas. Villanova won 81–67, its first win against Georgetown in the Big East tournament, improving its all-time record against Georgetown in the Big East tournament to 1–5. L. J. Peak led the Hoyas with 18 points. In his last game for Georgetown, Smith-Rivera scored 8 points on 4-for-11 shooting, missing all four three-pointers he attempted, while Hayes finished with 13 points and nine rebounds. Villanova advanced to meet Providence in the semifinals and, despite losing the Big East tournament championship game to Seton Hall, went on to the 2016 NCAA tournament, and eventually won the national championship.

=== Wrap-up ===
With a record of 15–18 and having lost seven of its last eight games and 10 of its last 12, Georgetown received no invitation to either the NCAA Tournament or the National Invitation Tournament for the first time since the 2003–2004 season and the first time in John Thompson III′s 12-season tenure as head coach. Although in the immediate aftermath of the loss to Villanova in the Big East tournament Thompson said that he was not sure if Georgetown would play in a third-tier postseason tournament such as the College Basketball Invitational, participation in such a tournament by a major-conference team was rare, and in the end he decided not to. The Hoyas′ season was over.

D'Vauntes Smith-Rivera was the team′s leading scorer for the season; he started all 33 games, shooting 41.3 percent from the field overall and 33.0 percent in three-pointers, averaging a team-high 16.2 points and 3.6 rebounds per game. L. J. Peak played in all 33 games, starting 12 of them, and averaged 12.3 points and 3.3 rebounds per game, shooting 49.1 percent from the field overall and 40.9 percent from three-point range. Isaac Copeland started all 33 games, shooting 42.9 percent in field-goal attempts and 27.2 percent from three-point range, and he averaged 11.1 points and 5.4 rebounds per game. Bradley Hayes missed six games with a broken hand but started the other 27, and he was the team′s fourth-leading scorer, averaging 8.7 points per game on 54.1 percent field-goal shooting, and led the team with 6.7 rebounds per game; it was a breakout season for him after he had spent most his first three years on the bench, averaging a combined 3.2 points per game. Marcus Derrickson played in 32 games and stated 27 of them, and he finished the year averaging 7.1 points and 4.5 rebounds per game, shooting 40.7 percent from the field. Jesse Govan appeared in all 33 games and started the six that Hayes missed due to injury; Govan ended the season with a field-goal percentage of 48.0 overall and 50 percent in three-pointers, with per-game averages of 6.8 points and 4.1 rebounds. Reggie Cameron started six of the 32 games he played in, and he averaged 5.6 points per game on 40.1 percent shooting from the field – 35.6 percent from beyond the arc – and grabbed 2.0 rebounds per game. Tre Campbell averaged 4.1 points and 1.8 rebounds in the 30 games he played in, 20 of them starts, and shot 30.5 percent from the field overall and 27.0 percent from three-point range, while Kaleb Johnson started once in his 32 appearances, shooting 58.0 percent from the field overall and 53.8 percent in three-pointers, although he averaged only 2.8 points per game and pulled down an average of 1.7 rebounds per game. Trey Mourning came off the bench in 20 games; he shot 52.2 percent from the field but finished with only 1.5 points per game. Walk-on Riyan Williams played in 23 games off the bench, his high for a season during his Georgetown career, and averaged 0.3 point per game. Paul White struggled with a hip injury during the season, and he played in only seven games, all off the bench, before undergoing an abdominal procedure that ended his season; he averaged 1.6 points and 1.6 rebounds in those games.

When D'Vauntes Smith-Rivera scrapped his plans to enter the NBA draft in the spring of 2016 and returned to play for Georgetown for a fourth season in 2015–2016, expectations for 2015–2016 had soared; what pundits and fans thought would be a rebuilding year with mediocre play in the wake of Smith-Rivera′s departure changed to anticipation of him leading the Hoyas in a return to the Top 25, a second-place finish in the Big East, and a second consecutive appearance in the NCAA Tournament. However, the team had an up-and-down early season and then collapsed in February and March, and the season fell far below expectations. The 2015–2016 Hoyas were a young team with a roster that included only one player – Smith-Rivera – who previously had played more than a season with significant minutes, and even Smith-Rivera, who finished as the team's leading scorer for the season, had a down year – at least by his standards – shooting his lowest field-goal, three-point, and free-throw percentages since his freshman season. The 2015–2016 squad suffered in particular from committing too many fouls and too many turnovers; they had the 345th-worst fouling rate among the 351 NCAA Division I teams, and they turned over the ball 19 percent of the time on offense, the 244th-worst rate in NCAA Division I. Georgetown finished the regular season third in the Big East in field-goal percentage defense at 41.1, but also had great difficulty in defending against three-pointers. Injuries also dogged the team: Akoy Agau missed the entire season with a knee injury, Paul White – the team′s leading scorer off the bench the previous year – missed all but seven games with a hip injury, and Bradley Hayes′s broken hand had forced him to miss six key games at the end of the regular season, all of which Georgetown lost. The Hoyas never made the Top 25 in either the Associated Press Poll or the Coaches Poll during the season – the first time that had happened since the 2013–2014 season and only the second time since the 2003–2004 season – and they finished in eighth place in the Big East, their first losing record in the conference since the 2008–2009 season and their worst conference finish since 2008–2009. They finished with an overall record of 15–18, their first losing season since the 2003–2004 season and only their third since the 1972–1973 season. They had no postseason play for the first time since the 2003–2004 season.

D'Vauntes Smith-Rivera and Riyan Williams graduated after the season. Smith-Rivera completed his four years at Georgetown as the fifth-leading scorer in Georgetown men's basketball history with 1,919 points and the program′s all-time leader in three-point shots made, having hit 250 of the 691 three-pointers he attempted. He played in 130 games, starting 97 of them, shooting 42.3 percent from the field – 36.2 percent from three-point range – and averaging 14.8 points and 3.9 rebounds per game. He went undrafted in the 2016 National Basketball Association draft but played professionally in other leagues. Riyan Williams, a little-used three-season walk-on who had played in 32 games and scored eight points during his Georgetown career, had a year of college eligibility left after graduation, and he chose to transfer to NCAA Division II Goldey–Beacom College to play the following season. His father, Georgetown great Reggie Williams, would tell the press a year later that Riyan had been "miserable" at Georgetown.

A surprise returnee for the following season was senior Bradley Hayes. He was due to graduate in 2016, and virtually everyone, including Hayes himself, believed as the 2015–2016 season came to an end that his college career was over. However, John Thompson III had secretly applied for an NCAA waiver that would allow Hayes to return for a fifth year as a redshirt senior in 2016–2017 because he had played in only nine games and for only 14 minutes during his freshman year and had a semester to go to complete his degree. The NCAA granted the waiver, provided that Hayes sat out the first four games of the 2016–2017 season. Thompson informed Hayes that he could return for a fifth year only ten minutes before Hayes was to give a farewell speech at the annual men's basketball banquet in late April 2016 and told Hayes to break the news of his return instead of saying farewell. Hayes did, to the delight and applause of the other attendees at the banquet.

Paul White also received redshirt status after playing in only seven games in the 2015–2016 season due to his hip injury, but he did not stay at Georgetown. After he played in the Kenner League at McDonough Gymnasium on the Georgetown University campus over the summer of 2016, Georgetown announced on August 18, 2016, that he was transferring after two seasons with the Hoyas. On August 31, 2016, he announced that he would transfer to Oregon, where under NCAA rules he would have to sit out the 2016–2017 season before beginning play with the Ducks in the 2017–2018 season. L. J. Peak, meanwhile, considered foregoing his last two years of college and entering the 2016 NBA draft, but John Thompson III and his staff talked Peak out of it, and Peak decided to return to Georgetown for his junior year.

Criticism of John Thompson III′s performance as head coach reached a high level with the failure of the 2015–2016 team, with many fans calling for him to be fired and the campus newspaper The Hoya referring to him as "one of the most polarizing figures in college sports." The Georgetown men's basketball program, a perennial national contender for many years, appeared to many observers to be in a steepening decline; the team′s fan base was eroding and attendance at Georgetown home games was dropping. Fox Sports 1, which had secured the contract to broadcast the new Big East Conference′s games when the new conference was formed in 2013, counted on Georgetown serving as the new conference′s flagship member and as a major factor in drawing viewers to the new Big East, as Georgetown had in the original Big East from 1979 to 2013. But the network found itself losing money on Big East broadcasts as viewer interest in the conference declined along with Georgetown′s performance on the court.

Although Smith-Rivera′s graduation left the team with no obvious on-court leader for the following year, the surprise return of Bradley Hayes – who had emerged as an important part of Georgetown′s defense and inside game during his senior year – fed hopes that the Hoyas would return to contention in 2016–2017 rather than suffer through a rebuilding year. In reality, more disappointment lay ahead for the Georgetown men′s basketball team in what was to be another troubled season in 2016–2017, and it would be Thompson′s last as head coach.

== Roster ==
Senior guard Riyan Williams, the son of Reggie Williams, made the team as a walk-on for the third straight season, and sophomore forward Trey Mourning, the son of Alonzo Mourning, returned for his second season. They were the third and fourth sons, respectively, of a former player to play for Georgetown. Other than Mourning and Williams, only two sons of former players had played at Georgetown: Patrick Ewing Jr., who played for Georgetown during the 2006-2007 and 2007-2008 seasons and was the son of Patrick Ewing, and Ed Hargaden Jr., who played during the 1957-1958, 1958-1959, and 1959-1960 seasons and was the son of Ed Hargaden, Georgetown′s first All-American and star of the 1932-1933, 1933-1934, and 1934-1935 teams.

2015–16 Georgetown Hoyas men's basketball team
Players
Coaches

Pos.	#	Name	Height	Weight	Year	Previous school	Hometown
SF	0	L. J. Peak	6 ft 5 in (1.96 m)	215 lb (98 kg)	So	Gaffney High School	Gaffney, South Carolina
G	1	Tre Campbell	6 ft 2 in (1.88 m)	170 lb (77 kg)	So	St. John's College High School	Washington, D.C.
G	4	D'Vauntes Smith-Rivera	6 ft 3 in (1.91 m)	215 lb (98 kg)	Sr	North Central/Oak Hill Academy	Indianapolis, Indiana
PF	5	Reggie Cameron	6 ft 7 in (2.01 m)	225 lb (102 kg)	Jr	Hudson Catholic	Hackensack, New Jersey
G	10	Ra'Mond Hines (W)	6 ft 4 in (1.93 m)	175 lb (79 kg)	So	Gonzaga College High School	Washington, D.C.
F	11	Isaac Copeland	6 ft 9 in (2.06 m)	220 lb (100 kg)	So	Brewster Academy	Raleigh, North Carolina
F	13	Paul White	6 ft 8 in (2.03 m)	230 lb (104 kg)	So	Whitney Young High School	Chicago, Illinois
C	15	Jessie Govan	6 ft 10 in (2.08 m)	270 lb (122 kg)	Fr	Wings Academy	Queens Village, New York
G	21	Riyan Williams (W)	6 ft 4 in (1.93 m)	185 lb (84 kg)	Sr	Archbishop Carroll	Dunkirk, Maryland
F	22	Akoy Agau (injured) (redshirt)	6 ft 8 in (2.03 m)	235 lb (107 kg)	RS So	Omaha Central High School	Omaha, Nebraska
F	24	Marcus Derrickson	6 ft 7 in (2.01 m)	250 lb (113 kg)	Fr	Brewster Academy	Bowie, Maryland
F	32	Kaleb Johnson	6 ft 6 in (1.98 m)	205 lb (93 kg)	Fr	Carlisle School	South Hill, Virginia
F	33	Trey Mourning	6 ft 9 in (2.06 m)	230 lb (104 kg)	So	Ransom Everglades School	Miami, Florida
C	42	Bradley Hayes	7 ft 0 in (2.13 m)	275 lb (125 kg)	Sr	Sandalwood High School	Jacksonville, Florida

Head coach

- John Thompson III (Princeton)

Assistant coach(es)

- Kevin Broadus (Bowie State)
- Tavaras Hardy (Northwestern)
- Kevin Sutton (James Madison)

Legend

- (C) Team captain
- (S) Suspended
- (I) Ineligible
- (W) Walk-on
- Injured
- Current redshirt

Roster
Last update: December 1, 2015

== Schedule ==
Date time, TV	Rank^{#}	Opponent^{#}	Result	Record	Site (attendance) city, state
Italy Trip (Exhibition)
Aug 16, 2015*; 12:30 pm		vs. Haukar Basket (Iceland)	W 74–64	—	Arena Atletico Felicio; Rome, Italy
Aug 18, 2015*; 12:30 pm		vs. Dream Team Select (Italy)	W 95–36	—	Arena Atletico Felicio; Rome, Italy
Aug 20, 2015*; 12:30 pm		vs. BC Atletas (Lithuania)	L 85–90	—	Palaterme; Florence, Italy
Aug 22, 2015*; 12:30 pm		vs. SAM Basket Massagno (Switzerland)	W 76–73	—	Palamondo; Lugano, Switzerland
Regular season
Nov 14, 2015*; Noon, FS2		Radford; 2K Sports Classic Washington Regional	L 80–82 ^{2OT}	0–1	Verizon Center (8,187); Washington, D.C.
Nov 17, 2015*; 9 pm, ESPN2		at No. 3 Maryland; Gavitt Tipoff Games	L 71–75	0–2	Xfinity Center (17,950); College Park, MD
Nov 20, 2015*; 5 pm, ESPN2		vs. Wisconsin; 2K Sports Classic Semifinal	W 71–61	1–2	Madison Square Garden; New York, NY
Nov 22, 2015*; 1 pm, ESPN		vs. No. 5 Duke; 2K Sports Classic Championship	L 84–86	1–3	Madison Square Garden (17,287); New York, NY
Nov 28, 2015*; Noon, FS2		Bryant; 2K Sports Classic Washington Regional	W 77–47	2–3	Verizon Center (7,876); Washington, D.C.
Dec 1, 2015*; 7 pm, FS1		Maryland Eastern Shore	W 68–49	3–3	Verizon Center (4,062); Washington, D.C.
Dec 5, 2015*; 1:07 pm, FOX		No. 14 Syracuse; Rivalry	W 79–72	4–3	Verizon Center (18,231); Washington, D.C.
Dec 7, 2015*; 7 pm, FS2		Brown	W 74–57	5–3	Verizon Center (4,690); Washington, D.C.
Dec 12, 2015*; 2:30 pm, CBSSN		UNC Wilmington; BB&T Classic	W 87–82	6–3	Verizon Center (8,132); Washington, D.C.
Dec 15, 2015*; 7:30 pm, FS1		Monmouth	L 68–83	6–4	Verizon Center (5,258); Washington, D.C.
Dec 19, 2015*; Noon, FSN		UNC Asheville	L 73–79	6–5	Verizon Center (7,467); Washington, D.C.
Dec 22, 2015*; 7 pm, CBSSN		vs. Charlotte	W 62–59	7–5	Time Warner Cable Arena (6,448); Charlotte, NC
Dec 30, 2015; 9:15 pm, FS1		at DePaul	W 70–58	8–5 (1–0)	Allstate Arena (5,873); Rosemont, IL
Jan 2, 2016; 5:30 pm, FS1		Marquette; Big East New Year's Marathon	W 80–70	9–5 (2–0)	Verizon Center (10,253); Washington, D.C.
Jan 5, 2016; 9:15 pm, FS1		at Creighton	L 66–79	9–6 (2–1)	CenturyLink Center (16,425); Omaha, NE
Jan 9, 2016; Noon, FS1		DePaul	W 74–63	10–6 (3–1)	Verizon Center (8,435); Washington, D.C.
Jan 13, 2016; 6:30 pm, FS1		at St. John's	W 93–73	11–6 (4–1)	Madison Square Garden (7,837); New York, NY
Jan 16, 2016; 1 pm, CBS		No. 6 Villanova	L 50–55	11–7 (4–2)	Verizon Center (15,535); Washington, D.C.
Jan 19, 2016; 8:45 pm, FS1		at No. 5 Xavier	W 81–72	12–7 (5–2)	Cintas Center (9,906); Cincinnati, OH
Jan 23, 2016*; Noon, CBS		at UConn	L 62–68	12–8	XL Center (15,564); Hartford, CT
Jan 26, 2016; 6:30 pm, FS1		Creighton	W 74–73	13–8 (6–2)	Verizon Center (6,897); Washington, D.C.
Jan 30, 2016; 8 pm, FS1		No. 10 Providence	L 69–73	13–9 (6–3)	Verizon Center (14,481); Washington, D.C.
Feb 2, 2016; 7 pm, FS1		at Butler	L 76–87	13–10 (6–4)	Hinkle Fieldhouse (8,080); Indianapolis, IN
Feb 6, 2016; 9:05 pm, CBSSN		at Seton Hall	L 61–69	13–11 (6–5)	Prudential Center (9,167); Newark, NJ
Feb 8, 2016; 7 pm, FS1		St. John's	W 92–67	14–11 (7–5)	Verizon Center (5,369); Washington, D.C.
Feb 13, 2016; 12:07 pm, FOX		at No. 20 Providence	L 72–75	14–12 (7–6)	Dunkin' Donuts Center (12,582); Providence, RI
Feb 17, 2016; 9:15 pm, FS1		Seton Hall	L 64–72	14–13 (7–7)	Verizon Center (5,278); Washington, D.C.
Feb 20, 2016; 12:07 pm, FOX		No. 8 Xavier	L 70–88	14–14 (7–8)	Verizon Center (10,652); Washington, D.C.
Feb 27, 2016; 12:06 pm, CBS		Butler	L 87–90 ^{OT}	14–15 (7–9)	Verizon Center (10,142); Washington, D.C.
Mar 1, 2016; 9:12 pm, FS1		at Marquette	L 87–88	14–16 (7–10)	BMO Harris Bradley Center (12,957); Milwaukee, WI
Mar 5, 2016; 12:07 pm, FOX		at No. 3 Villanova	L 71–84	14–17 (7–11)	Wells Fargo Center (20,173); Philadelphia, PA
Big East tournament
Mar 9, 2016; 7:00 pm, FS1	(8)	vs. (9) DePaul; First round	W 70–53	15–17	Madison Square Garden (12,604); New York, NY
Mar 10, 2016; Noon, FS1	(8)	vs. (1) No. 3 Villanova; Quarterfinals	L 67–81	15–18	Madison Square Garden (14,863); New York, NY
*Non-conference game. ^{#}Rankings from AP Poll. (#) Tournament seedings in parentheses. All times are in Eastern Time.

== Awards and honors ==
=== Big East Conference honors ===
Postseason honors
Honors	Player	Position	Date awarded	Ref.
All-Big East Second Team	D'Vauntes Smith-Rivera	G	March 6, 2016	
Big East All-Freshman Team	Jessie Govan	C	March 6, 2016	
