= Boys' Latin of Philadelphia Charter School =

Location
- 5501 Cedar Avenue; Philadelphia, Pennsylvania 19143; United States

Information
- Former name: Southwest Philadelphia Academy for Boys
- School type: Public charter school
- Motto: Latin: Faber Est Quisque Fortunae Suae ("Every man is the architect of his own fortune")
- Established: 2007
- Founders: David Hardy & Janine Yass
- Status: Open
- School district: Boys Latin of Philadelphia CS
- NCES District ID: 4200760
- Local authority: School District of Philadelphia
- School code: PA-185515523-7981
- CEEB code: 393378
- NCES School ID: 420076006107
- Principal: Eros Uthman-Olukokun
- CEO: William Hayes
- Faculty: 65.80 (on an FTE basis)
- Grades: 6–12
- Gender: All-male
- Enrollment: 843 (2020–2021)
  - Grade 6: 118
  - Grade 7: 123
  - Grade 8: 117
  - Grade 9: 149
  - Grade 10: 146
  - Grade 11: 99
  - Grade 12: 91
- Student to teacher ratio: 12.81
- Colors: Navy & Maroon
- Athletics conference: PPL, PIAA
- Nickname: Warriors
- USNWR ranking: 9,525
- Website: www.boyslatin.org

Boys' Latin of Philadelphia Charter School (formerly the Southwest Philadelphia Academy for Boys and often known simply as Boys' Latin of Philadelphia or Boys' Latin) is a Pennsylvania approved secondary charter school located in Philadelphia, Pennsylvania, in the United States.

== History ==
David P. Hardy and Janine Yass founded Boys' Latin of Philadelphia, which opened in 2007 with 144 students. After initially being denied a charter by the School Reform Commission (SRC), Yass and Hardy led a petition drive leading to the SRC's decision to grant a charter in 2007. Boy's Latin of Philadelphia is the first and only single gender charter school in Philadelphia. In 2012, upon completing the charter renewal process, Boys' Latin of Philadelphia was granted permission to expand to middle school, grades six through eight. The middle school opened the following year, with its first cohort completing eighth grade in 2016.

== Admissions ==
Boys' Latin of Philadelphia enrolls by randomized lottery. As a public charter school, there are no admission requirements. Any boy in grades 6–12 living in Philadelphia is eligible to apply for the lottery.

In the 2017–2018 school year, the dropout rate was 0%.

=== Demographics ===
Enrollment by Race/Ethnicity 2020–2021
Black	Two or More Races	Hispanic	Asian
782	44	16	1

== Curriculum ==
Boy's Latin of Philadelphia offers a standard high school curriculum with major strengths in Latin and Western humanities. The school requires graduating seniors to complete an independent senior project. Students must complete yearly community service.

== Campus ==
Boys' Latin of Philadelphia was temporarily housed in modules with only seven classrooms during the 2007–2008 academic year. The following year, the school moved into a newly renovated school building with a capacity of 600 students.

== Notable alumni ==
- Maurice Watson, basketball player for Maccabi Rishon LeZion of the Israeli Basketball Premier League
