= Chase Jeter =

American basketball player (born 1997)

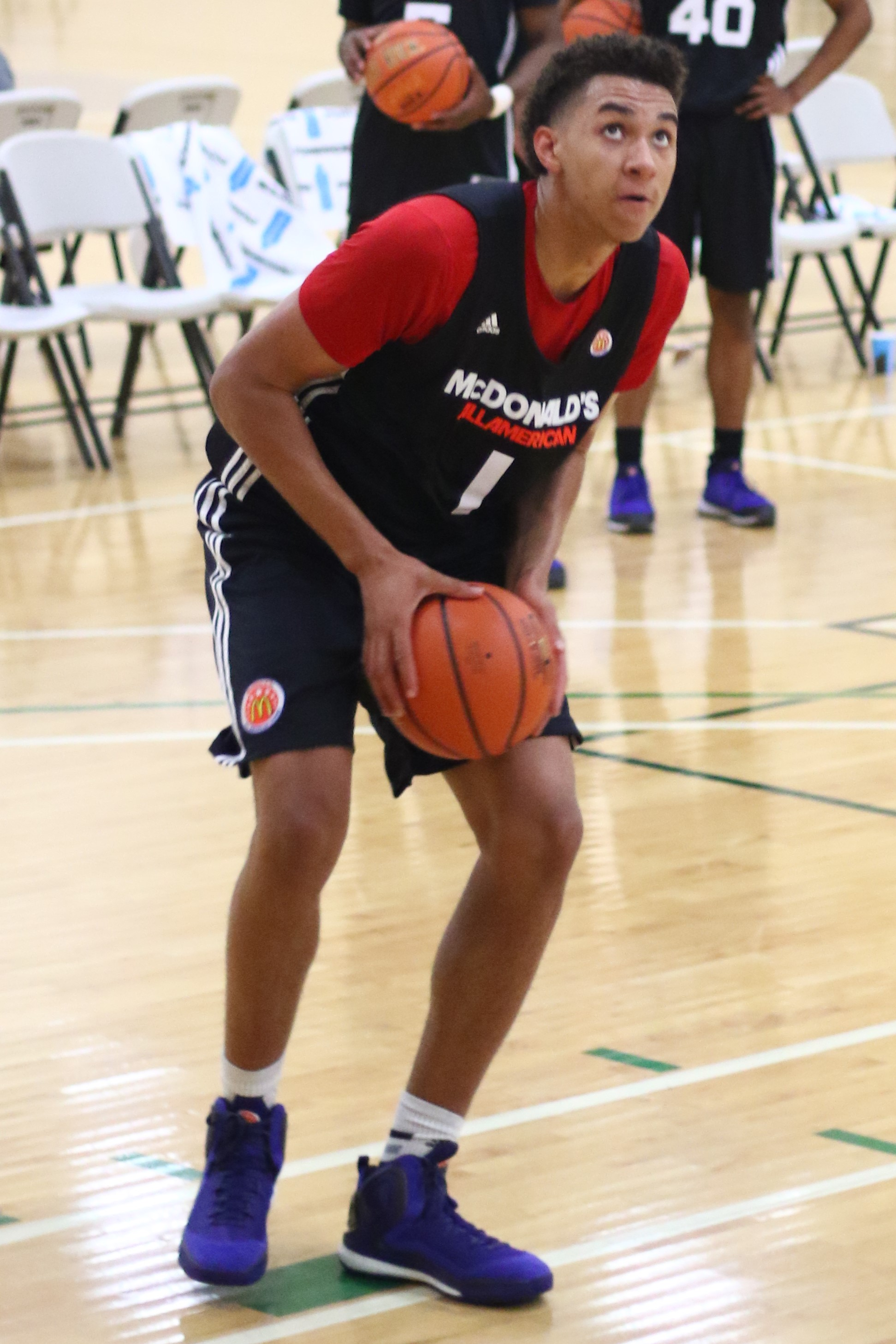
- Jeter at 2015 McDonald's All-American Game practice

No. 88 – Hawke's Bay Hawks
- Position: Center
- League: NZNBL

Personal information
- Born: September 19, 1997 (age 29) Las Vegas, Nevada, U.S.
- Listed height: 6 ft 10 in (2.08 m)
- Listed weight: 225 lb (102 kg)

Career information
- High school: Bishop Gorman (Summerlin, Nevada)
- College: Duke (2015–2017); Arizona (2018–2020)
- NBA draft: 2020: undrafted
- Playing career: 2022–present

Career history
- 2022–2023: Flyers Wels
- 2023–2024: NH Ostrava
- 2025: Capital City Go-Go
- 2025: Cleveland Charge
- 2026: Rio Grande Valley Vipers
- 2026: Austin Spurs
- 2026–present: Hawke's Bay Hawks

Career highlights
- McDonald's All-American (2015); Nike Hoop Summit (2015)
- Stats at NBA.com
- Stats at Basketball Reference
Medals
Men's basketball
Representing the United States
FIBA Americas U18 Championship
Gold medal – first place	2014 United States	Team

Chase Michael Jeter (born September 19, 1997) is an American professional basketball player for the Hawke's Bay Hawks of the New Zealand National Basketball League (NZNBL). He played college basketball for the Duke Blue Devils and Arizona Wildcats.

== High school career ==
Jeter played basketball for Bishop Gorman High School in Summerlin, Nevada. He played for the junior varsity team as a freshman and played in the adidas 64 Tournament with his Dream Vision team. He was promoted to the varsity team as a sophomore. By the time he was a junior, Jeter had become one of the most touted power forwards in high school basketball, receiving much collegiate attention. Five-star recruit Stephen Zimmerman was a teammate of Jeter's at Bishop Gorman. As a junior, he averaged 14.7 points and 10.6 rebounds per game, leading Gorman to a 30–3 record and Division I state title. In his senior season, Jeter averaged 16.2 points and 10.6 rebounds per game and won another Division I state championship. He was named Nevada Gatorade Player of the Year. At the end of the season, Jeter played in the McDonald's All-American Game and Nike Hoop Summit. He was a consensus five-star recruit and was ranked No. 11 overall in the 2015 class by ESPN. On August 4, 2014, Jeter committed to Duke over Arizona, Kansas, Oregon, UCLA and UNLV, citing the environment of the team's arena, Cameron Indoor Stadium.

== College career ==
Jeter received limited playing time in his freshman season, averaging 1.9 points and 1.9 rebounds per game over 32 appearances. During the early part of his sophomore season, Jeter would fill in for injured freshmen Marques Bolden and Harry Giles III. In his sophomore debut, he made his first career start, recording a season-high 11 points and eight rebounds in a 94–49 win over Marist. In January 2017, he missed a game against NC State as he underwent surgery to treat a herniated disk and was subsequently limited for the final two months of the season. As a sophomore, Jeter averaged 2.6 points, 2.7 rebounds and 1.1 blocks in 14.9 minutes per game. After the season, he announced that he would transfer from Duke and sit out the following season. Coach Mike Krzyzewski praised his academic record and stated he wished Jeter the best.

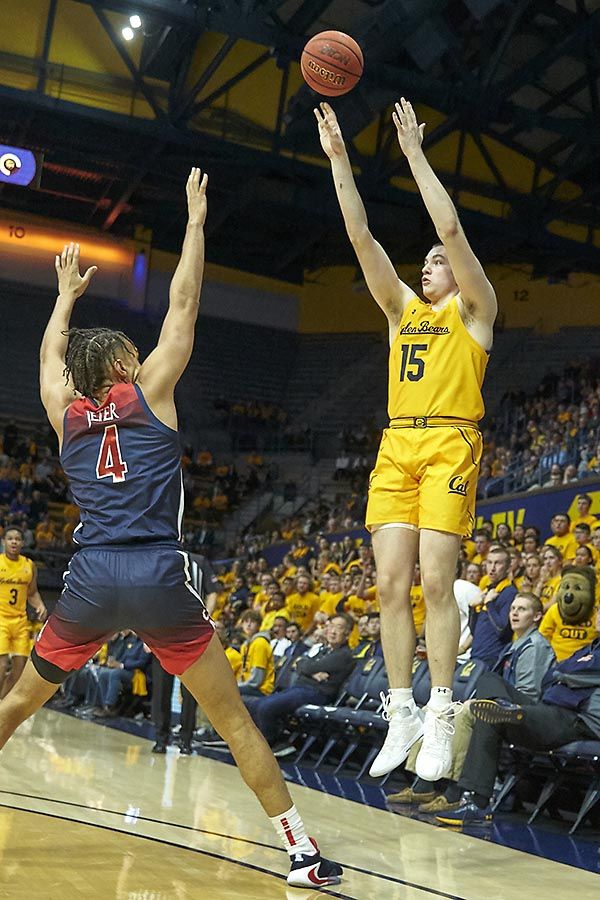
Jeter defending Grant Anticevich of California in 2020

On May 16, 2017, Jeter committed to continue his career at Arizona. In his debut for the Wildcats on November 7, 2018, he registered his first double-double with 11 points and 10 rebounds in a 90–60 victory over Houston Baptist. On January 12, 2019, Jeter posted a career-high 23 points and nine rebounds in an 87–65 win over California. Later that month, he missed two games with a sore back. When he returned against Arizona State, Jeter experienced lingering stiffness and went 1-of-5 from the floor. As a junior, Jeter averaged 10.9 points and a team-high 6.6 rebounds per game. After considering graduate transferring and playing professionally, he decided to remain with Arizona as a fifth-year senior while pursuing a master's degree. Jeter missed the final two games of the conference season for an undisclosed violation of team rules. He averaged 6.5 points, 4.2 rebounds in 16.2 minutes per game. His play was hampered by several injuries during his senior season.

== Professional career ==
After going undrafted in the 2020 NBA draft, Jeter was unable to pursue opportunities overseas due to the disruptions caused by the COVID-19 pandemic. As a result, he spent two years out of basketball, during which he completed his master's degree at the University of Arizona.

=== Raiffeisen Flyers Wels (2022–2023) ===
On October 13, 2022, Jeter signed with Flyers Wels of the Austrian Basketball Bundesliga. In 37 games, he averaged 8.3 points, 6.3 rebounds and 0.6 assists in 18.9 minutes.

=== NH Ostrava (2023–2024) ===
On June 26, 2023, Jeter signed with NH Ostrava of the Czech National Basketball League. In 19 games, he averaged 13.1 points, 6.7 rebounds and 0.7 assists in 21.6 minutes.

=== NBA G League (2025–2026) ===
On October 12, 2024, Jeter signed with the Oklahoma City Thunder, but was waived two days later. He subsequently joined the Oklahoma City Blue of the NBA G League, but he was waived prior to the start of the regular season. On January 17, 2025, he joined the Capital City Go-Go. In 15 games to finish the 2024–25 NBA G League season, he averaged 3.2 points and 2.5 rebounds per game.

On November 17, 2025, Jeter was acquired by the Sioux Falls Skyforce, but was later waived on November 28 before appearing in a game. He was acquired by the Cleveland Charge on December 26, played one game on December 30, and was then waived on December 31. On January 11, 2026, he was acquired by the Rio Grande Valley Vipers. He played two games for the Vipers before being waived on January 16. He was then acquired by the Austin Spurs on January 21, played three games, and was then waived again on January 26. He re-joined the Vipers on February 3 and played a further 14 games through March 27.

=== Hawke's Bay Hawks (2026–present) ===
On March 28, 2026, Jeter signed with the Hawke's Bay Hawks of the New Zealand National Basketball League (NZNBL) for the 2026 season.

== National team career ==
Jeter played for the United States at the 2014 FIBA Americas Under-18 Championship in Colorado Springs, Colorado. He joined the team as a replacement for Dwayne Morgan. Jeter averaged 6.6 points and 4.4 rebounds per game and won a gold medal.

== Career statistics ==
Legend
GP	Games played	GS	Games started	MPG	Minutes per game
FG%	Field goal percentage	3P%	3-point field goal percentage	FT%	Free throw percentage
RPG	Rebounds per game	APG	Assists per game	SPG	Steals per game
BPG	Blocks per game	PPG	Points per game	**Bold**	Career high

=== College ===
Year	Team	GP	GS	MPG	FG%	3P%	FT%	RPG	APG	SPG	BPG	PPG
2015–16	Duke	**32**	0	7.9	.553	–	.541	1.9	.1	.1	.3	1.9
2016–17	Duke	16	6	14.9	.500	–	.556	2.7	.4	.4	**1.1**	2.6
2017–18	Arizona	Redshirt										
2018–19	Arizona	30	**26**	**24.8**	**.574**	–	**.623**	**6.6**	**.6**	**.5**	.6	**10.9**
2019–20	Arizona	22	16	16.2	.564	–	.607	4.2	**.6**	.3	.4	6.5
Career		100	48	15.9	.564	–	.598	3.9	.4	.3	.5	5.7

== Personal life ==
Jeter's father, Chris, played college basketball for UNLV and was a reserve on its 1989–90 national championship team. Chris became a police officer for the Las Vegas Metropolitan Police Department.
