= Carlton Bragg Jr. =

American basketball player

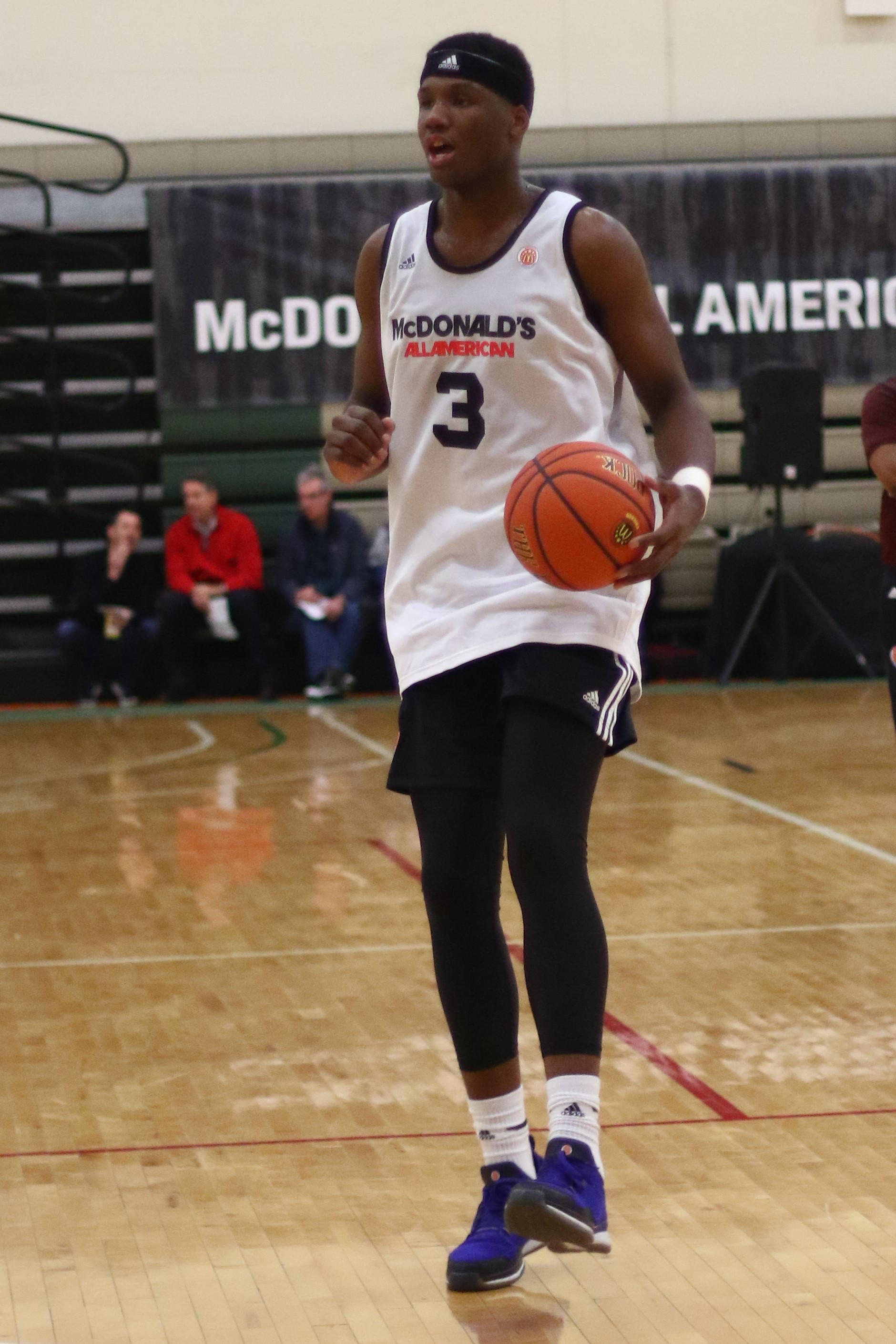
- Bragg at 2015 McDonald's All-American Game practice

APR
- Position: Power forward
- League: RBL; BAL

Personal information
- Born: December 14, 1995 (age 30) Cleveland, Ohio, U.S.
- Listed height: 6 ft 10 in (2.08 m)
- Listed weight: 225 lb (102 kg)

Career information
- High school: Villa Angela-St. Joseph (Cleveland, Ohio)
- College: Kansas (2015–2017); New Mexico (2018–2020)
- NBA draft: 2020: undrafted
- Playing career: 2020–present

Career history
- 2020: Nymburk
- 2020–2021: Polski Cukier Toruń
- 2021–2023: Balıkesir Büyükşehir Belediye
- 2023: Edmonton Stingers
- 2023–2024: Al Nassr Riyadh
- 2024: Manama Club
- 2024: Maccabi Rishon LeZion
- 2025: Al Nassr Riyadh
- 2025–present: APR

Career highlights
- McDonald's All-American (2015)
Medals
Men's basketball
Representing the United States
Universiade
Gold medal – first place	2015 South Korea	Team

Carlton Edward Bragg Jr. (born December 14, 1995) is an American professional basketball player for APR of the Rwanda Basketball League (RBL) and Basketball Africa League (BAL). He played college basketball for the New Mexico Lobos and the Kansas Jayhawks.

== Early life and high school career ==
Bragg was born in Cleveland and was raised in the neighborhood of Wade Park. Growing up, four of his friends were murdered. He often spent time at the gym and roller skating to escape violence in his hometown. Bragg played baseball before having a growth spurt and starting basketball in ninth grade. He played basketball for Villa Angela-St. Joseph High School in Cleveland. As a freshman, he also played baseball for the school as a first baseman and pitcher. In his junior season, Bragg averaged 18.5 points and 5.7 rebounds per game, leading his team to an Ohio High School Athletic Association Division III runner-up finish. As a senior, he averaged 21.3 points, eight rebounds and two blocks per game and won the Division III state championship. Bragg was named Division III Player of the Year and was selected to the McDonald's All-American Game. He was considered a five-star recruit by 247Sports and Rivals. On January 8, 2015, Bragg committed to Kansas over Illinois and Kentucky, joining fellow five-star recruit Cheick Diallo.

== College career ==
=== Kansas ===
On March 10, 2016, as a freshman at Kansas, Bragg scored a season-high 12 points in 11 minutes off the bench in an 85–63 quarterfinal win over Kansas State at the Big 12 tournament. He finished the season averaging 3.8 points and 2.5 rebounds in 8.9 minutes per game. Bragg made his sophomore debut on November 11, 2016, scoring 12 points in a 103–99 overtime loss to 11th-ranked Indiana at the Armed Forces Classic. Two games later, on November 18, he posted a season-high 15 points and 11 rebounds for his first career double-double in an 86–65 victory over Siena. On December 9, Bragg was suspended indefinitely after being arrested on a misdemeanor battery charge. He was reinstated when the charge was dropped five days later. On January 26, 2017, Bragg was again suspended indefinitely after being charged with possession of drug paraphernalia. He was reinstated five days after reaching a diversion agreement and missed three games due to the suspension. On February 22, 2017, Bragg matched his season-high of 15 points and grabbed seven rebounds in an 87–68 win over TCU. As a sophomore, he averaged 5.2 points and 4.1 rebounds in 13.8 minutes per game. After the season, Bragg announced that he was transferring from Kansas. He committed to continue his career at Arizona State on May 3, 2017 over Cincinnati and Illinois. He worked out with the team in the offseason but was not eligible to play due to National Collegiate Athletic Association (NCAA) transfer rules. Before the season began, Bragg had stopped traveling with the team, and by January 1, 2018, he had left the program.

=== New Mexico ===
On January 25, 2018, he announced that he was transferring to New Mexico. Bragg was forced to sit out the first semester due to NCAA transfer rules and became eligible to play on December 16, 2018. On March 9, 2019, he recorded 22 points and 20 rebounds, both the best marks of his career, in an 88–81 loss to Wyoming. He became the first New Mexico player to post at least 20 points and 20 rebounds since Drew Gordon in 2012. In 24 games as a junior, Bragg averaged 10.5 points, 8.8 rebounds and 1.2 blocks per game. He was named honorable mention All-Mountain West Conference by the media. On December 1, 2019, as a senior, Bragg chipped in a season-high 20 points and 14 rebounds in a 72–63 win over Montana. On December 16, he was recognized as Mountain West Player of the Week after recording 17 points and 17 rebounds in a 69–62 victory over New Mexico State. On December 22, Bragg was suspended indefinitely after being accused of attempted rape. After missing three games, he was reinstated on January 3, 2020. On January 12, Bragg was dismissed from the team after he was arrested on charges of driving under the influence and marijuana possession. Bragg averaged 12.6 points and 10.3 rebounds per game as a senior in 15 games.

== Professional career ==
On August 24, 2020, Bragg signed his first professional contract with Basketball Nymburk of the Czech National Basketball League. In his first and only game, he had 2 points, 2 rebounds and 1 assist.

On September 21, he signed with Polski Cukier Toruń of the Polish Basketball League.

On August 5, 2021, he has signed with Balıkesir Büyükşehir Belediye of the Turkish Basketball First League (TBL).

On December 8, 2025, Bragg was announced as a new signing of Rwandan champions APR of the Rwanda Basketball League (RBL) and Basketball Africa League (BAL).

== National team career ==
Bragg represented the United States with several Kansas teammates at the 2015 Summer Universiade in Gwangju, South Korea. He averaged 3.8 points and 3.8 rebounds per game and helped win a gold medal.

== Personal life ==
Bragg's father, also named Carlton, is a house painter and bowler. He has a son, Carlton III, who was born in May 2017.
