= 2015 McDonald's All-American Boys Game =

American high school basketball game

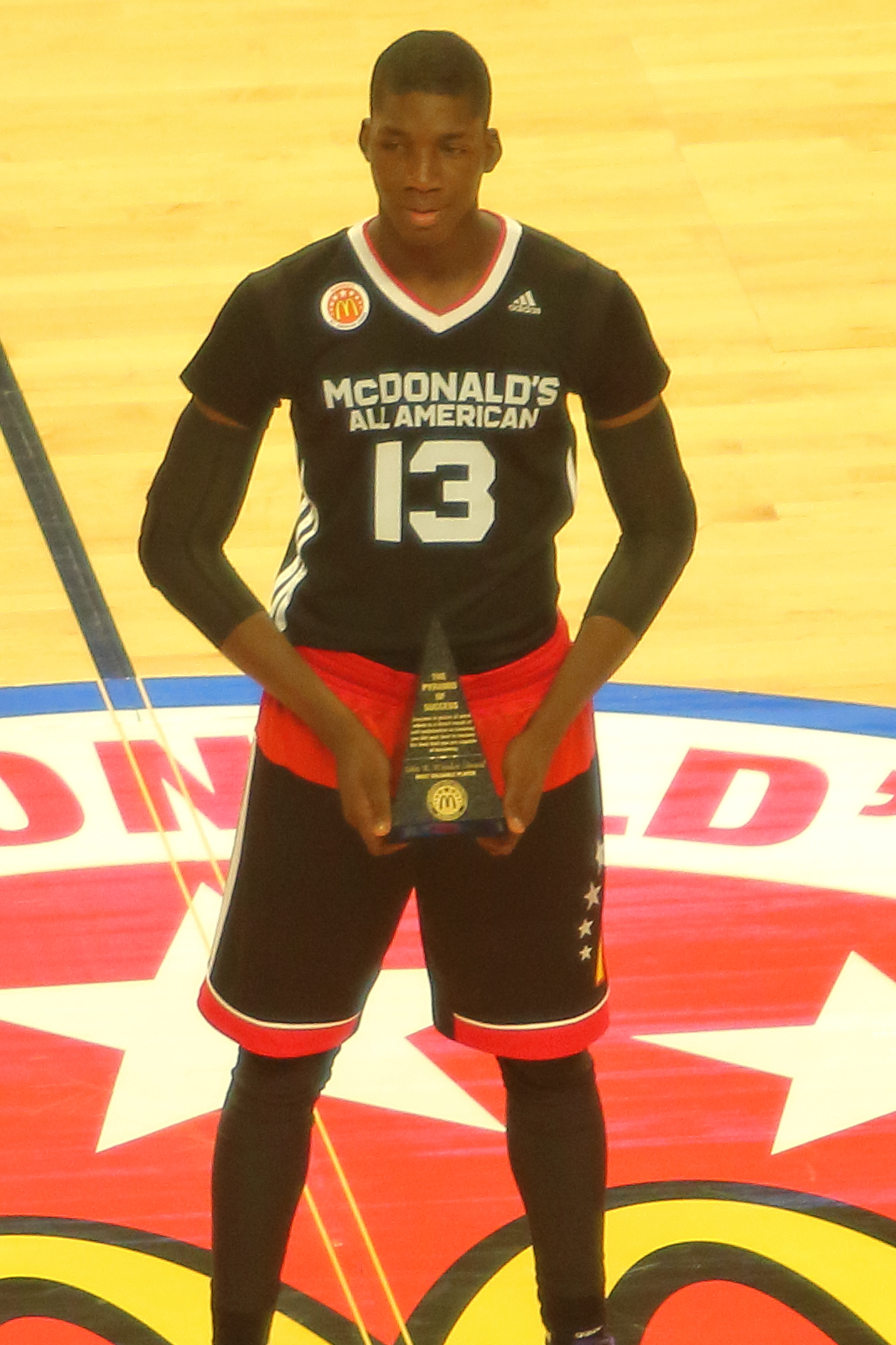
- Cheick Diallo being honored as MVP
East	West
111	91
	1st half	2nd half	Total
East	49	62	111
West	46	45	91
- Date: April 1, 2015
- Venue: United Center, Chicago, Illinois
- MVP: Cheick Diallo
- Referees: Steve Honacki, John Washo, Kevin Grayer
- Halftime show: Jesse White Tumbling Team
- Network: ESPN

McDonald's All-American

The 2015 McDonald's All-American Boys Game was an All-star basketball game that was played on April 1, 2015, at the United Center in Chicago, home of the Chicago Bulls. It was the 38th annual McDonald's All-American Game for high school boys. The game's rosters features the best and most highly recruited blue chip boys high school basketball players graduating in 2015. Chicago, which became the first city to host the game in back-to-back years in 2012, continued to host the game annually for the fifth consecutive time. When the rosters for the game were announced on January 28, 15 of the 24 players had committed to Division I basketball programs; Duke and LSU led the field with two commits each.

On March 10, 2015, Ben Simmons was named the Morgan Wootten Award winner, regarded as the McDonald's All-American national player of the year award. In the game, the East team—led by MVP Cheick Diallo's 18 points and 10 rebounds—defeated the West team by a 111–91 margin. In the associated Jam Fest, Dwayne Bacon, Luke Kennard and Jalen Brunson won the slam dunk contest, three-point shooting contest and skills competition, respectively.

== Rosters ==
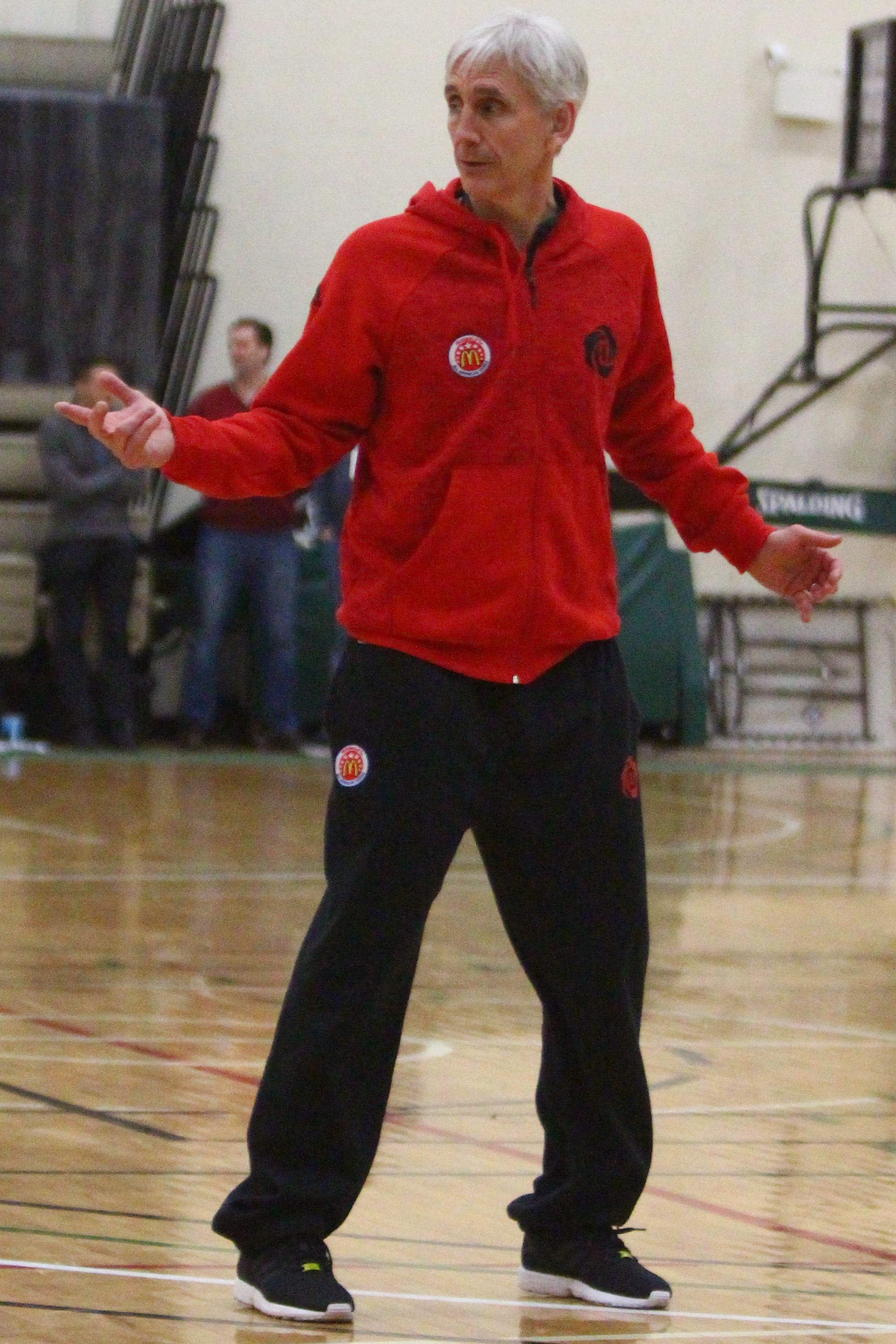
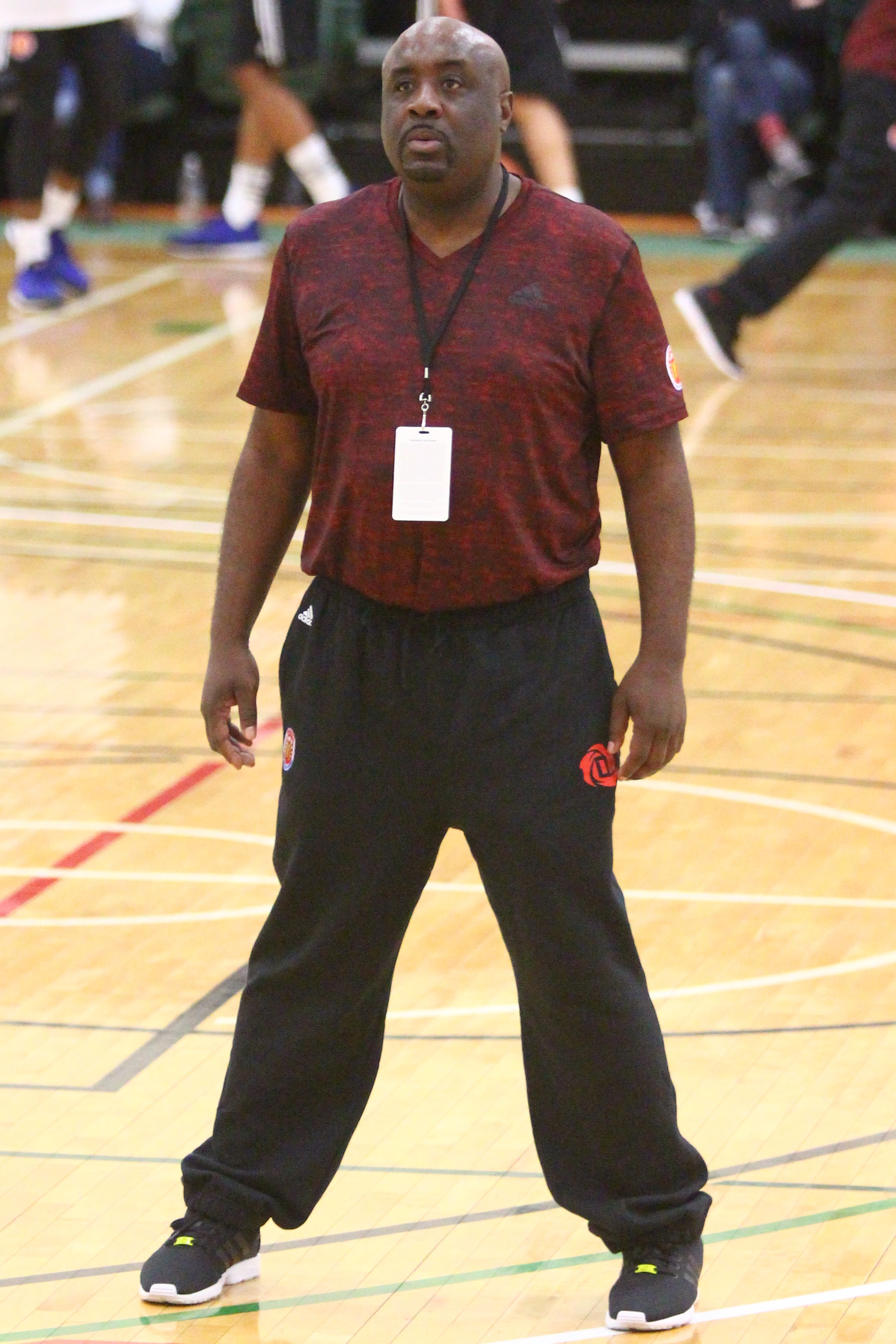
2015 All-American Boys game coaches Bruce Kelley (left) and Robert Smith (right) during the March 29 closed practice

At the time of the roster announcement the 24 players included 22 of the top 25 players according to the 2015 ESPN 100. The two highest rated players (Ben Simmons and Jaylen Brown) were both named to the East team. The West team roster was highlighted by Malik Newman. Based on ratings at ESPN.com, the highest rated eligible player not invited was number 18 ranked Texas A&M signee Tyler Davis. However, according to 247Sports.com's composite ranking, the highest rated non-invitee was 15th-ranked Arizona signee Ray Smith. Nine uncommitted players at the time of the roster announcement was regarded as a high total and was higher than the total of two the year before. Kentucky signee Skal Labissière (number 3 at ESPN and number 5 at 247Sports.com) was not eligible due to his athletic ineligibility after transferring. As of gametime, 8 players remained undecided on their college affiliations. 5 of the players were scheduled to begin play in the Dick's Sporting Goods High School Nationals the following day.

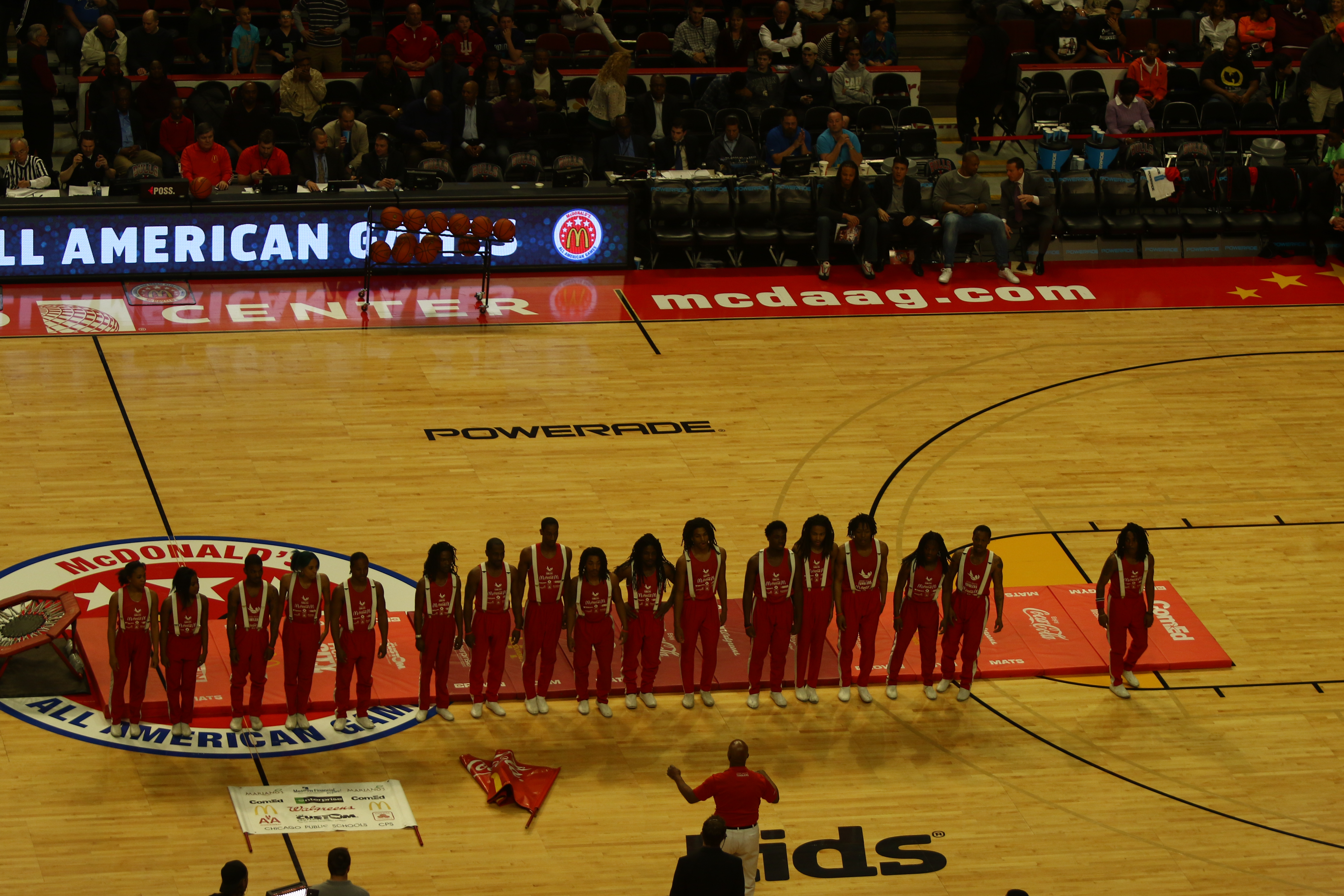
Halftime performers Jesse White Tumbling Team

On March 10, 2015, Simmons was named the Morgan Wootten Award winner, given annually to the best male McDonald's All-American player who exemplifies outstanding character, exhibits leadership and embodies the values of being a student-athlete in the classroom and in the community. In doing so, he joined Austin Rivers (2011) as the only Florida high schoolers to win the award. In the week prior to the game Diamond Stone committed to Maryland. Also, Jaylen Brown made news that week for a stop sign violation, but his participation in the game was not in jeopardy. Henry Ellenson endured a broken hand on March 20 in the Wisconsin Interscholastic Athletic Association Division 2 semifinals, and he did not play in the McDonald's All-American game.

The POWERADE Jam Fest was held at the Gerald Ratner Center of the University of Chicago on March 30. The slam dunk contest included Kristine Anigwe, who was attempting to become the first girl to win the dunk contest since Candace Parker won the 2004 contest. Dwayne Bacon won the dunk contest against finalist Stephen Zimmerman with dunks that included a dunk over Jalen Rose who stood in front of the basket, while Anigwe failed to complete a dunk. Luke Kennard won the boys three-point shooting contest over finalists Jalen Brunson and Antonio Blakeney. Brunson won the boys Skills Competition over finalists Carlton Bragg Jr. and Isaiah Briscoe.

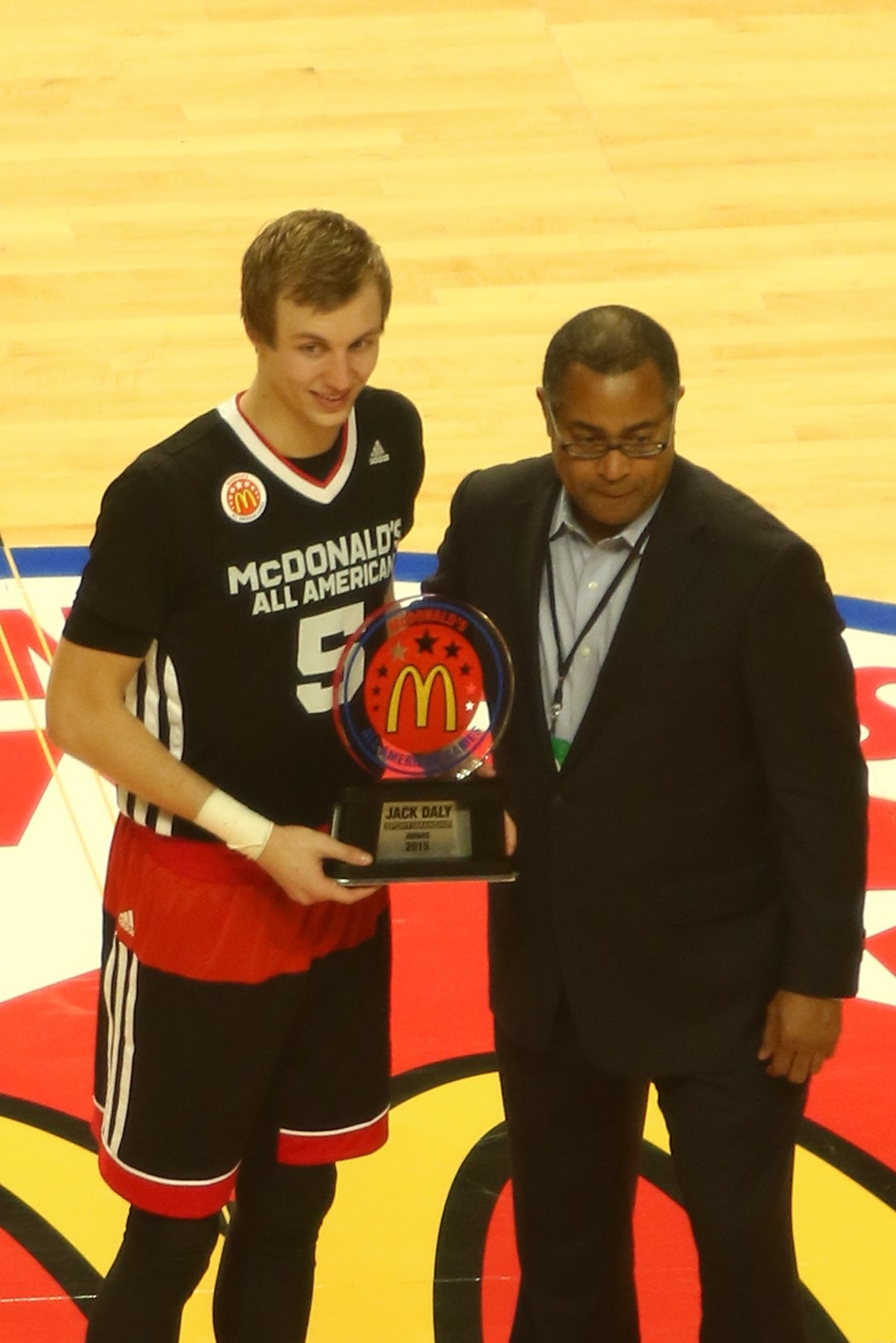
Luke Kennard won the Jack Daly Award for sportsmanship

Following the game, Thomas Bryant committed to Indiana on April 4. On April 10, Caleb Swanigan committed to Michigan State (joining Davis). Ivan Rabb committed to California on April 13. Zimmerman committed to UNLV on April 16. Newman committed to Mississippi State on April 24. North Carolina native, Brandon Ingram, who had risen to #3 overall in the ESPN 100 prior to his announcement, selected Duke (joining Kennard and Jeter) on April 27. The following day, Diallo committed to Kansas (joining Bragg). Jaylen Brown committed to California (joining Rabb) on May 1. On May 7, Swaningan decommitted from Michigan State. Then on May 19, he committed to Purdue.

=== East Roster ===
#	Name	Height	Weight	Position	Hometown	High school	College choice
4	Dwayne Bacon	6–6	209	SG	Lakeland, FL	Oak Hill Academy	Florida State
2	Antonio Blakeney	6–4	170	SG	Orlando, FL	Oak Ridge High School	LSU
12	Isaiah Briscoe	6–3	200	PG	Union, NJ	Roselle Catholic High School	Kentucky
1	Jaylen Brown	6–7	220	SF	Alpharetta, GA	Wheeler High School	California^
31	Thomas Bryant	6–10	220	C	Rochester, NY	Huntington Prep	Indiana^
13	Cheick Diallo	6–9	225	PF	Centereach, NY	Our Savior New American School	Kansas^
10	Henry Ellenson	6–10	230	PF	Rice Lake, WI	Rice Lake High School	Marquette
0	Jawun Evans	6–0	180	PG	Dallas, TX	Justin F. Kimball High School	Oklahoma State
5	Luke Kennard	6–5	180	SG	Franklin, OH	Franklin High School	Duke
3	Dedric Lawson	6–8	195	PF	Memphis, TN	Hamilton High School	Memphis
25	Ben Simmons	6–9	225	PF	Melbourne, AUS	Montverde Academy	LSU
33	Diamond Stone	6–10	250	C	Milwaukee, WI	Dominican High School	Maryland^

^player was uncommitted when the team was announced

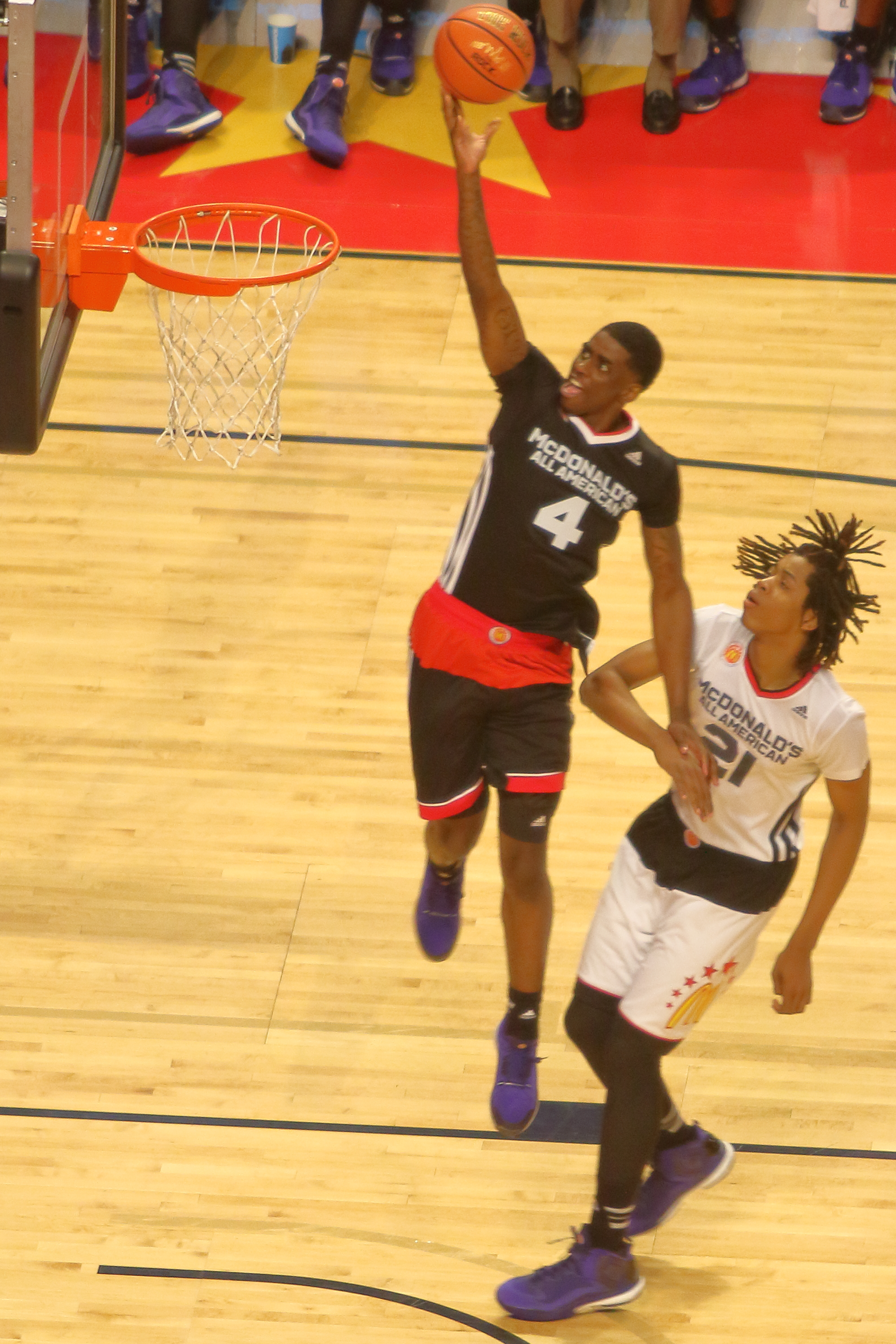
Dwayne Bacon

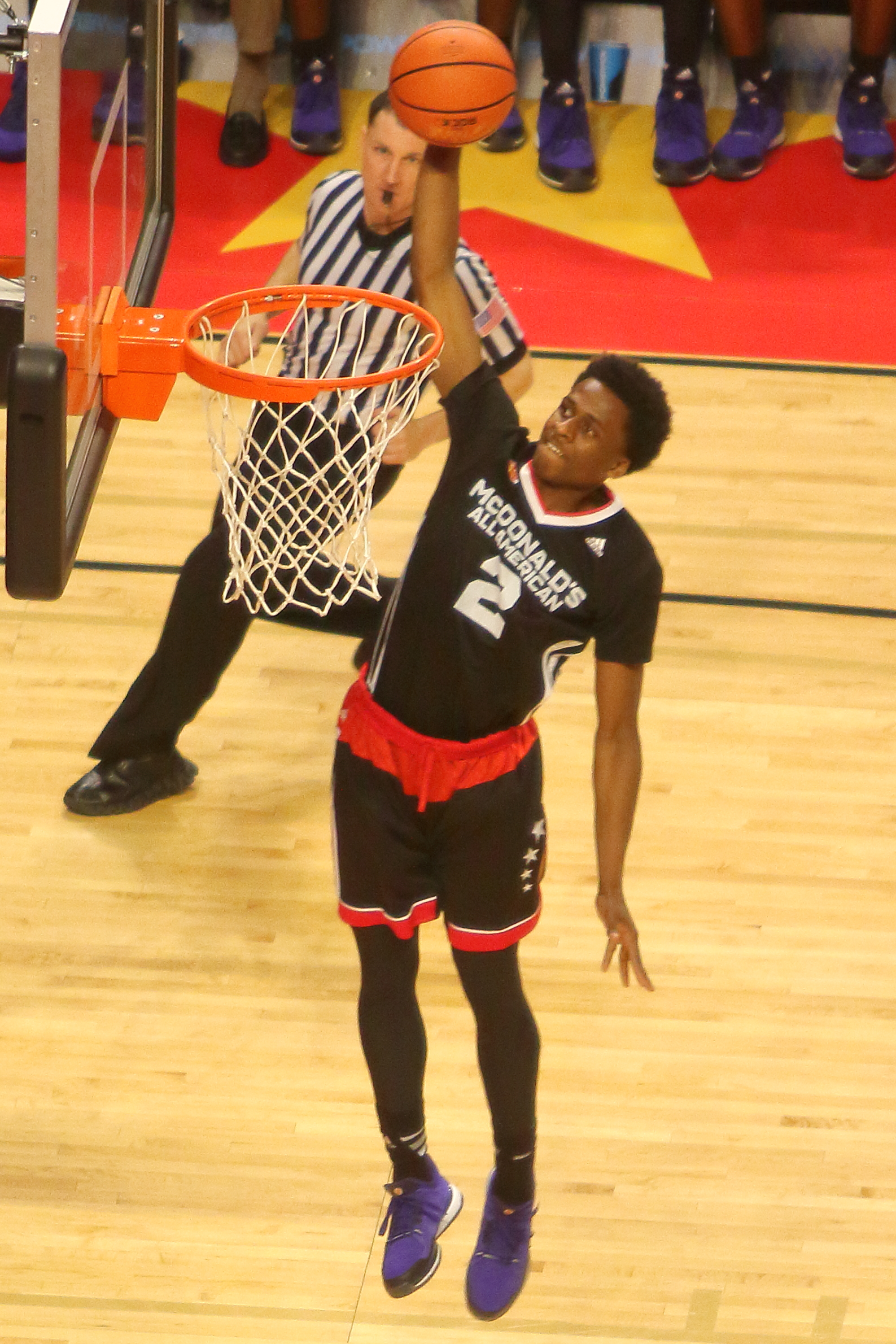
Antonio Blakeney

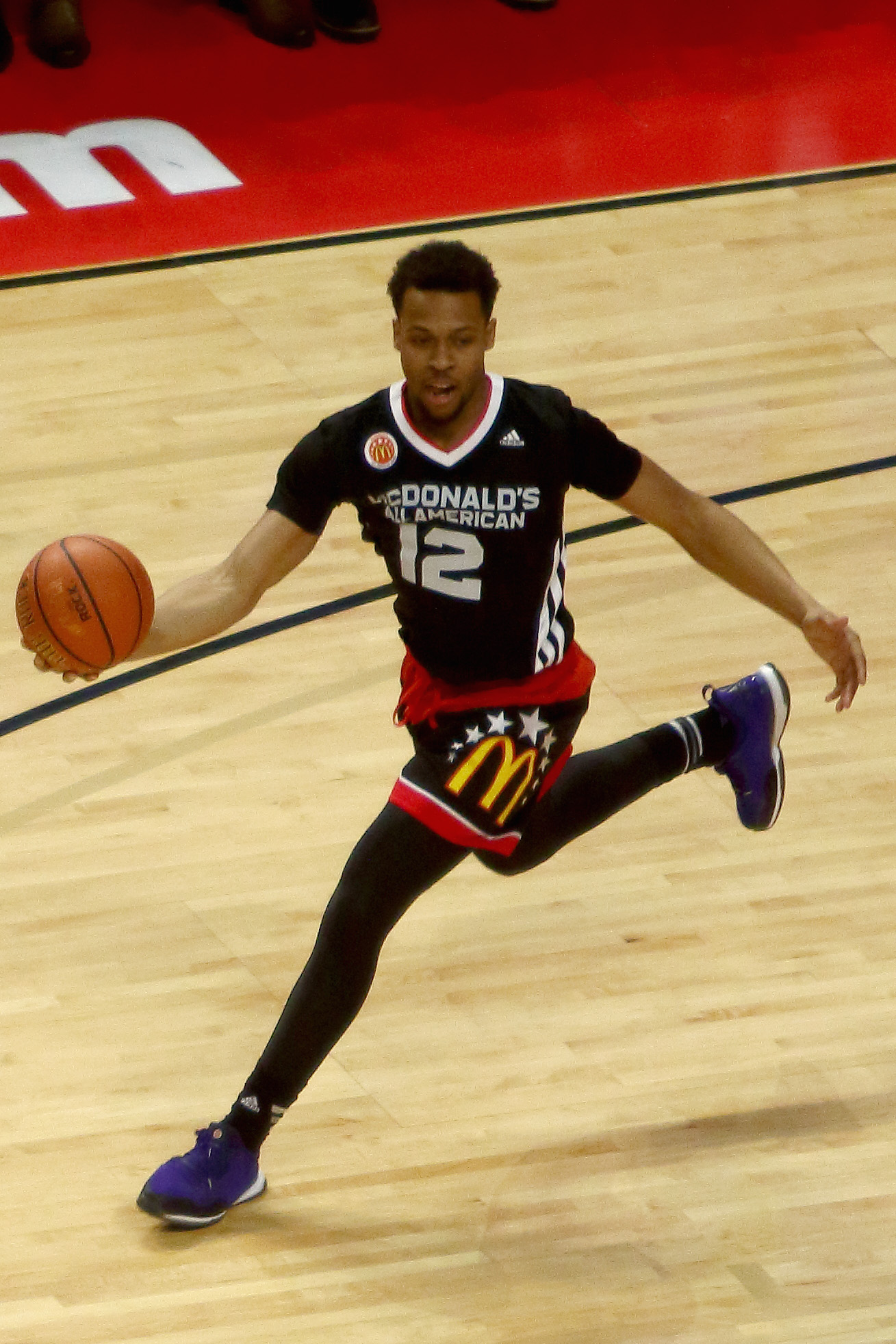
Isaiah Briscoe

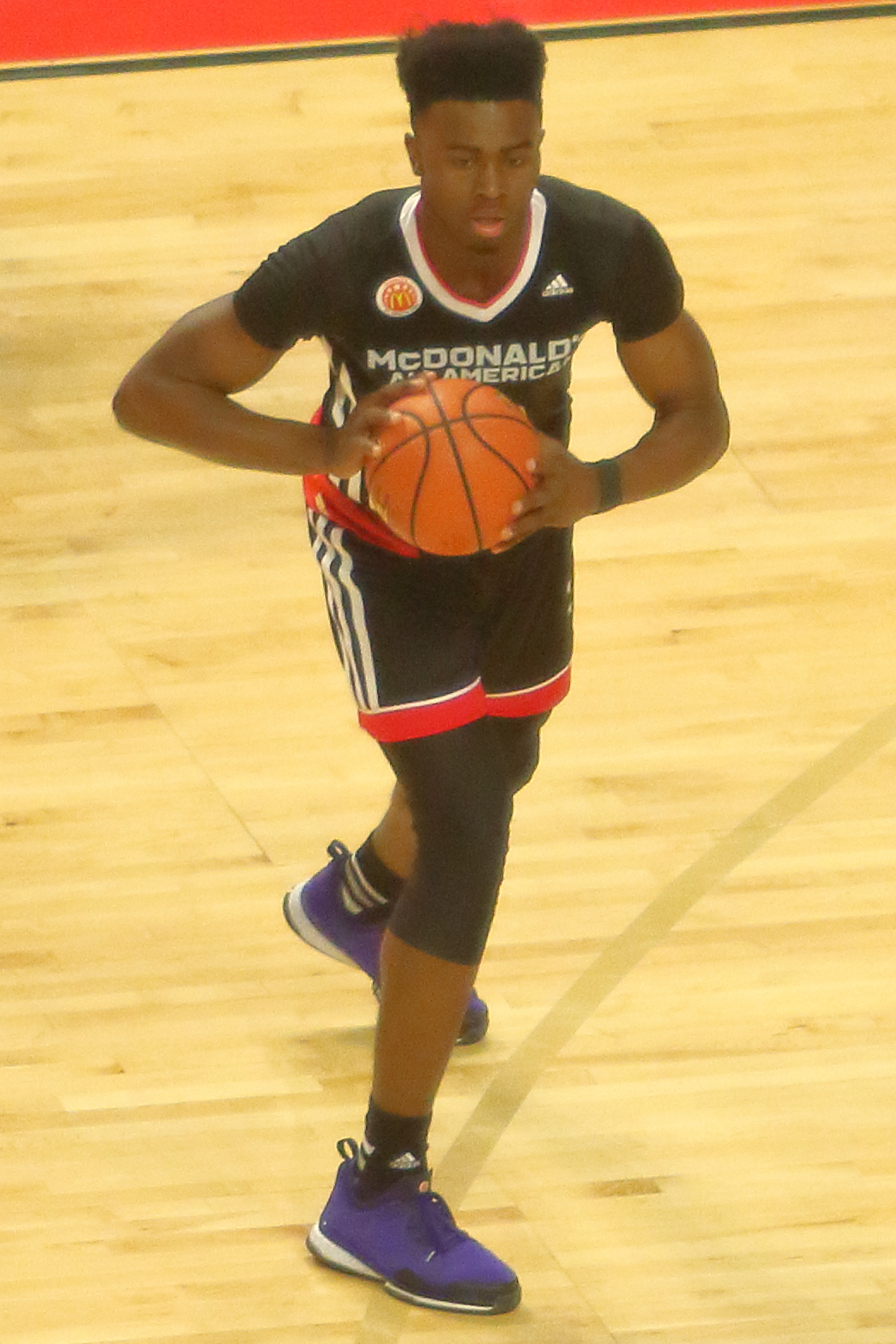
Jaylen Brown

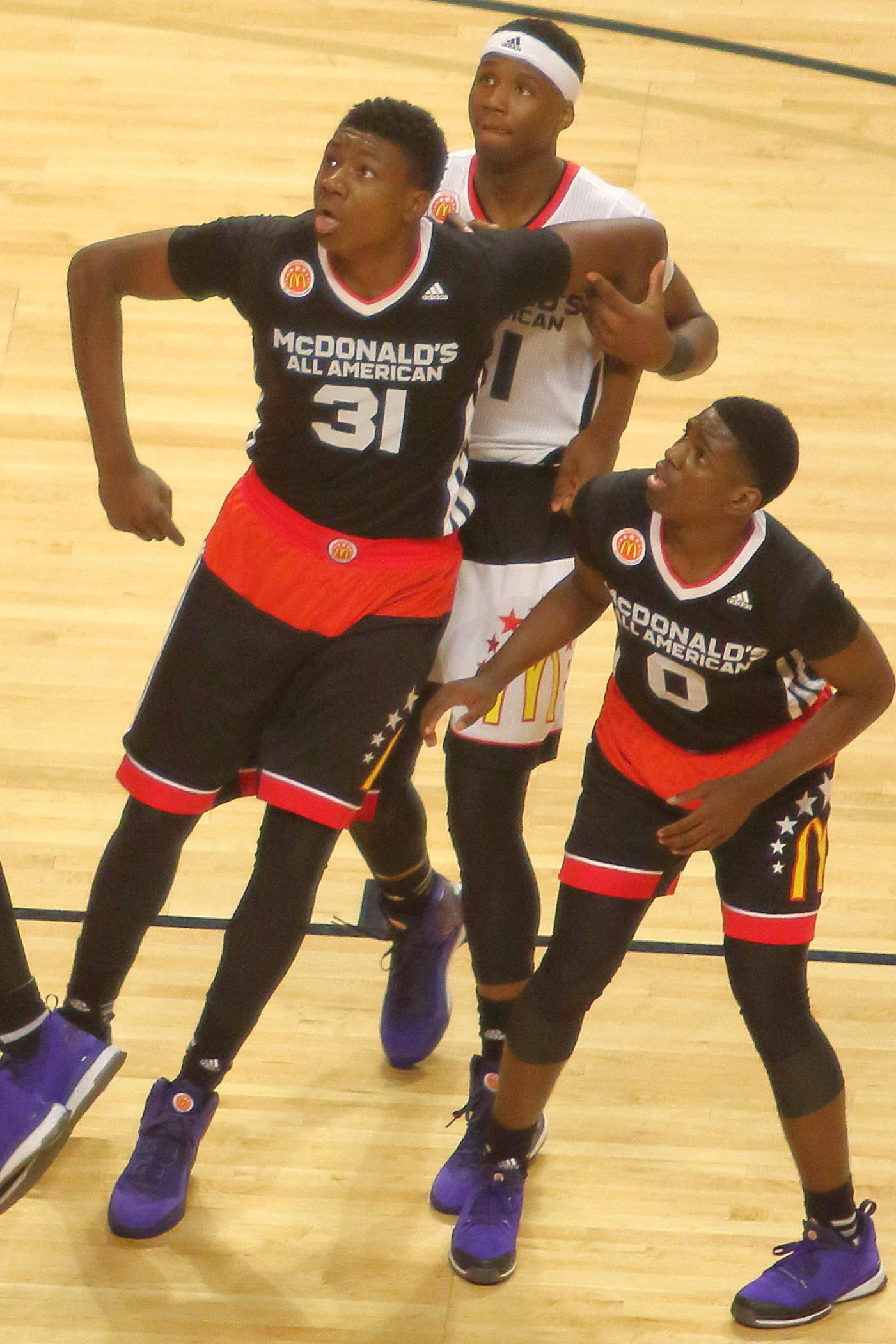
Thomas Bryant

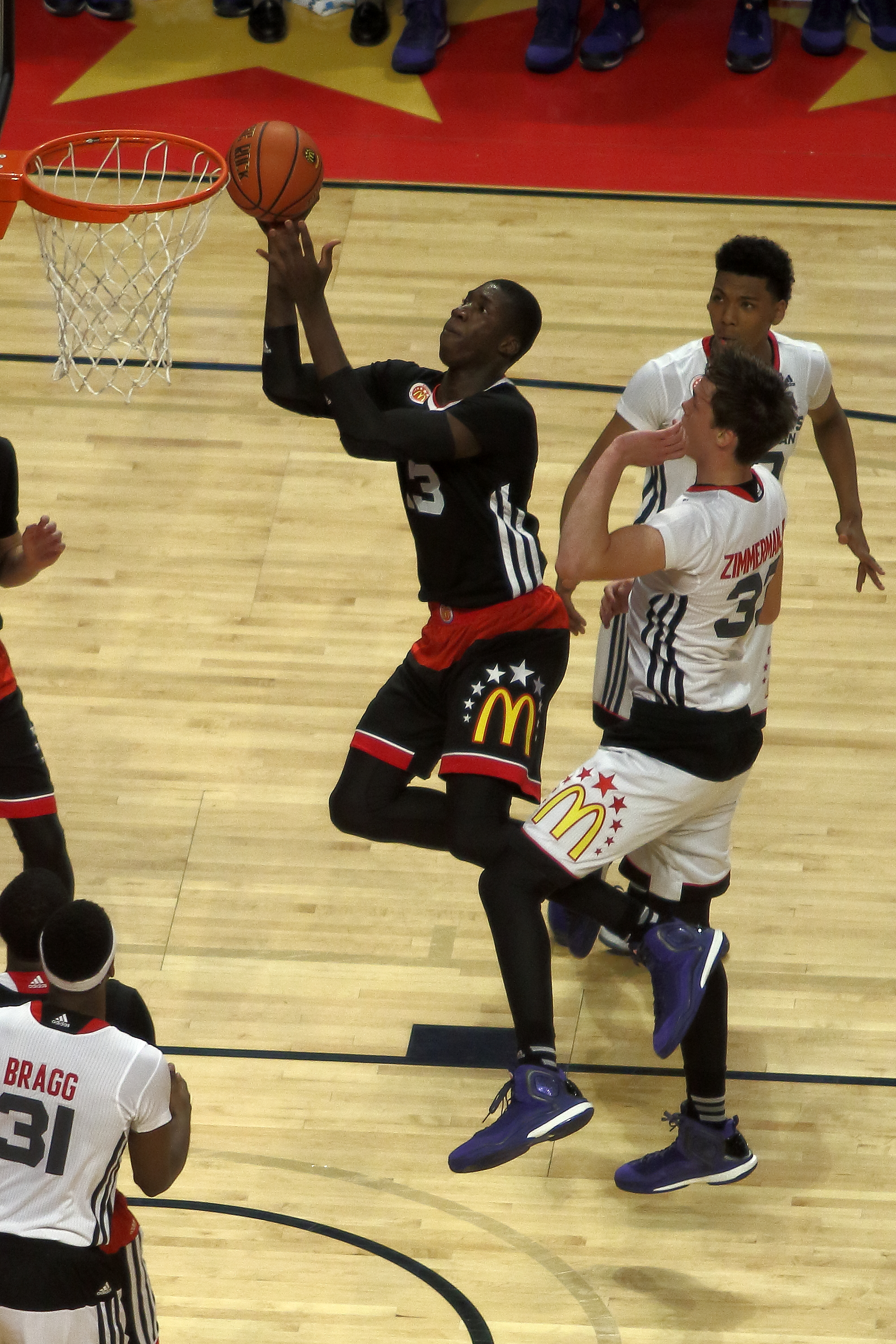
Cheick Diallo

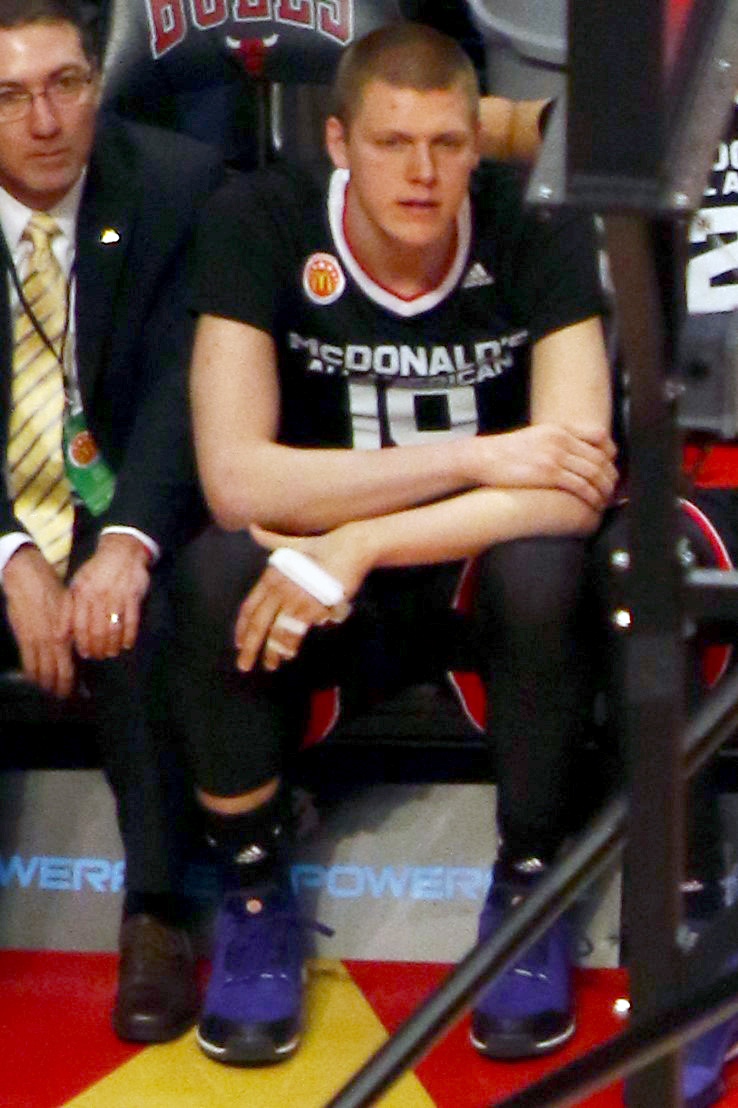
Henry Ellenson

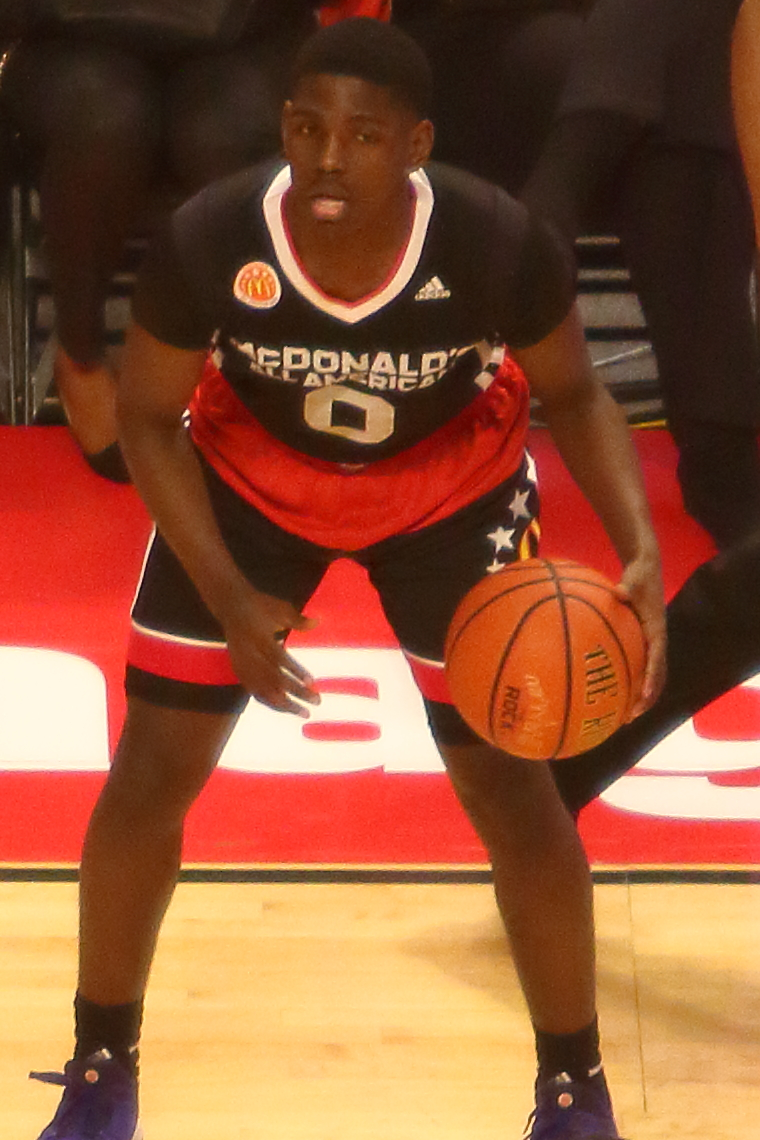
Jawun Evans

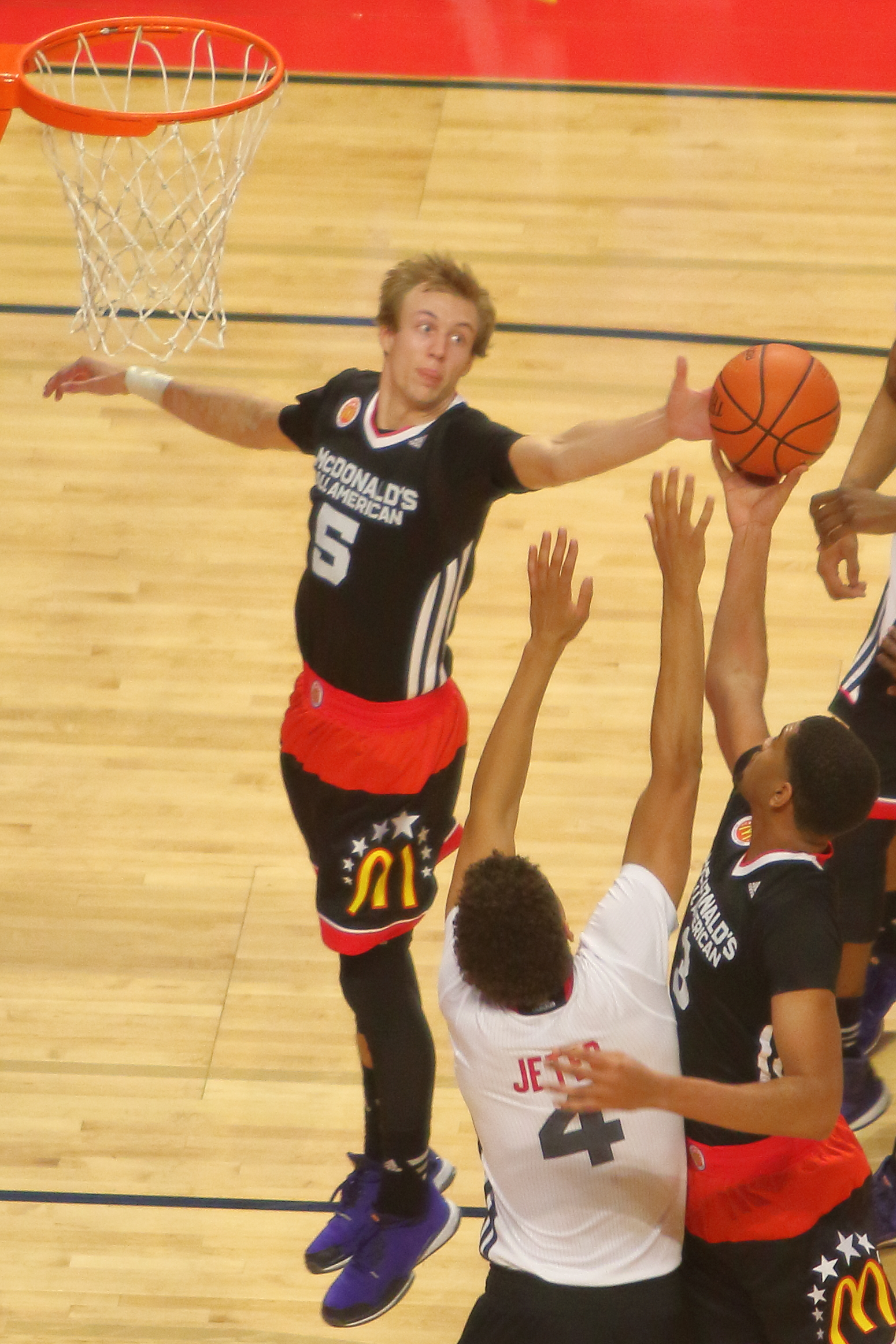
Luke Kennard

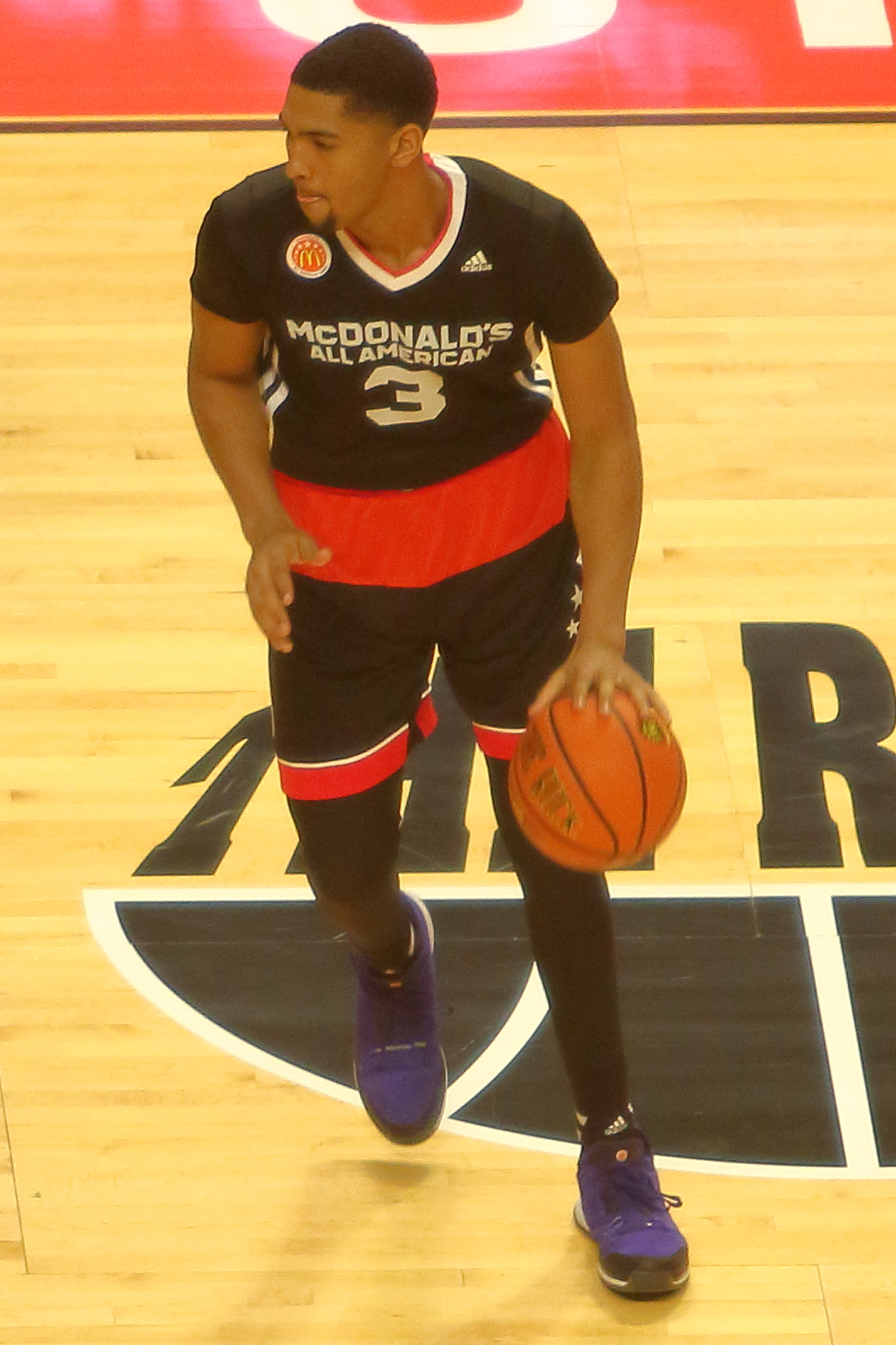
Dedric Lawson

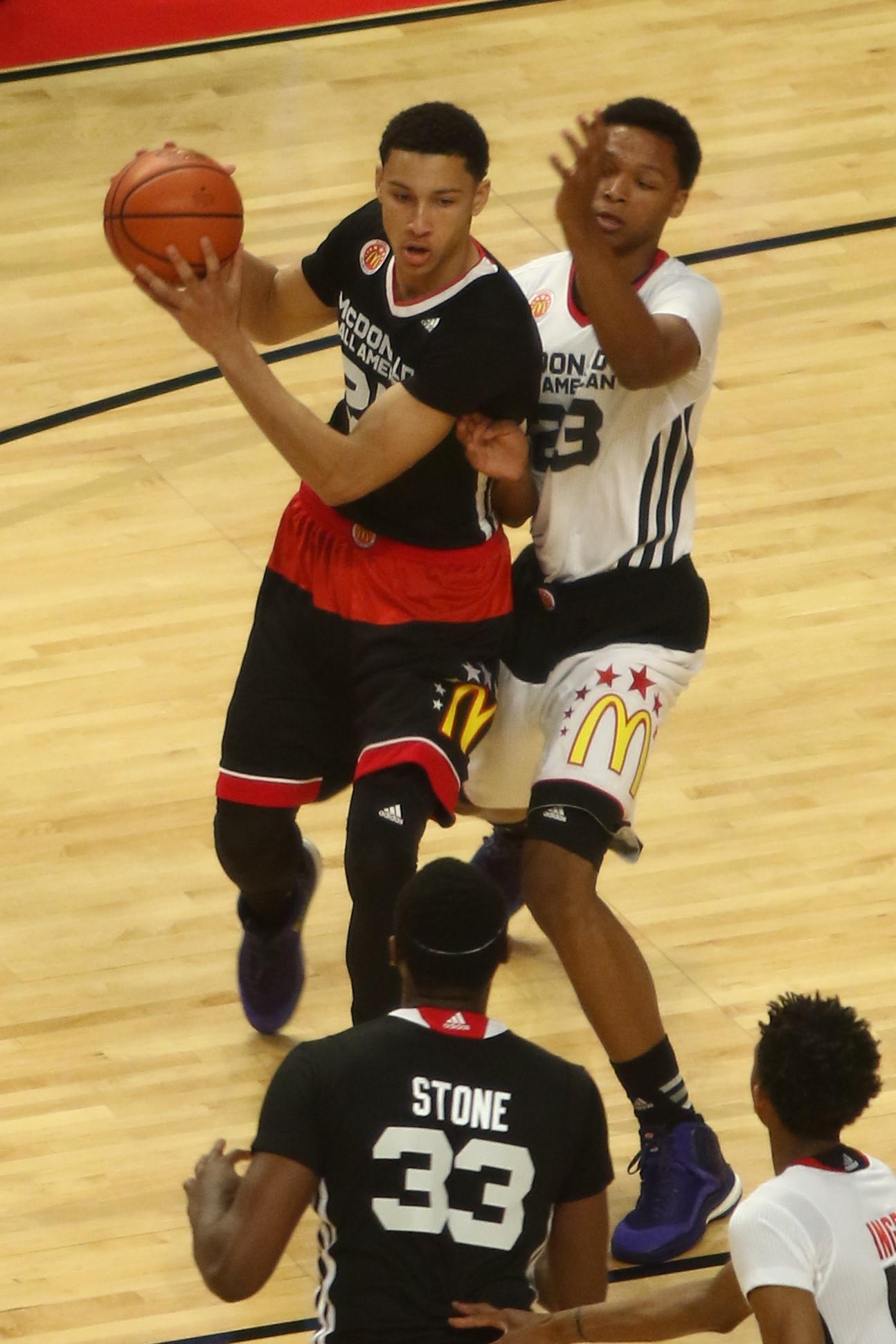
Ben Simmons

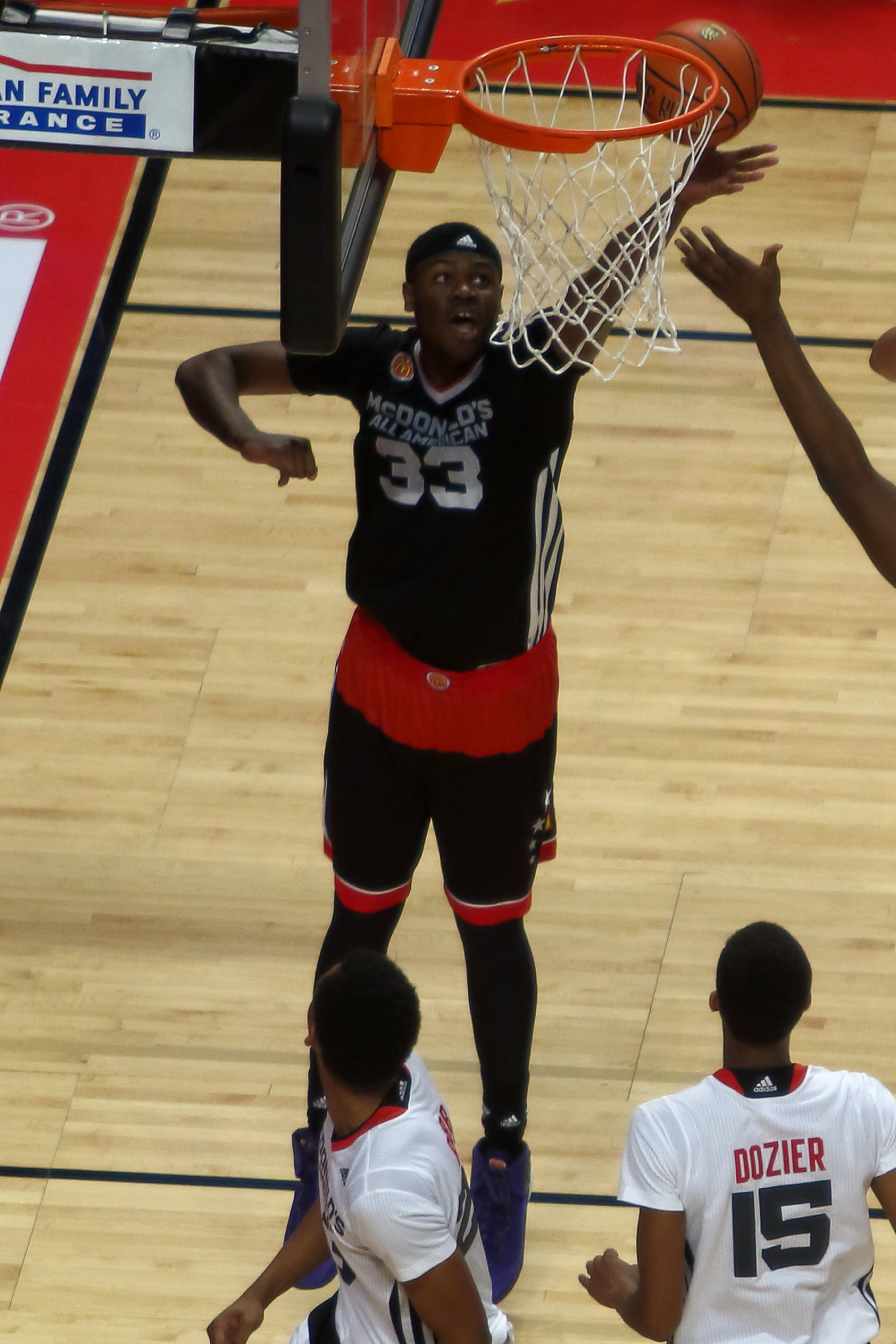
Diamond Stone

=== West Roster ===
#	Name	Height	Weight	Position	Hometown	High school	College choice
31	Carlton Bragg Jr.	6–9	220	PF	Cleveland, OH	Villa Angela-St. Joseph High School	Kansas
12	Jalen Brunson	6–1	180	PG	Lincolnshire, IL	Adlai E. Stevenson High School	Villanova
21	Deyonta Davis	6–9	210	PF	Muskegon, MI	Muskegon High School	Michigan State
15	PJ Dozier	6–6	185	PG	Columbia, SC	Spring Valley High School	South Carolina
13	Brandon Ingram	6–8	198	SF	Kinston, NC	Kinston High School	Duke^
4	Chase Jeter	6–10	215	C	Las Vegas, NV	Bishop Gorman High School	Duke
14	Malik Newman	6–3	175	SG	Jackson, MS	Callaway High School	Mississippi State^
23	Ivan Rabb	6–11	210	PF	Oakland, CA	Bishop O'Dowd High School	California^
1	Malachi Richardson	6–6	190	SG	Hamilton, NJ	Trenton Catholic Academy	Syracuse
50	Caleb Swanigan	6–8	275	C	Fort Wayne, IN	Homestead High School	Purdue^
20	Allonzo Trier	6–4	190	SG	Seattle, WA	Findlay College Prep	Arizona^
33	Stephen Zimmerman	7–0	230	C	Las Vegas, NV	Bishop Gorman High School	UNLV^

^player was uncommitted when the team was announced

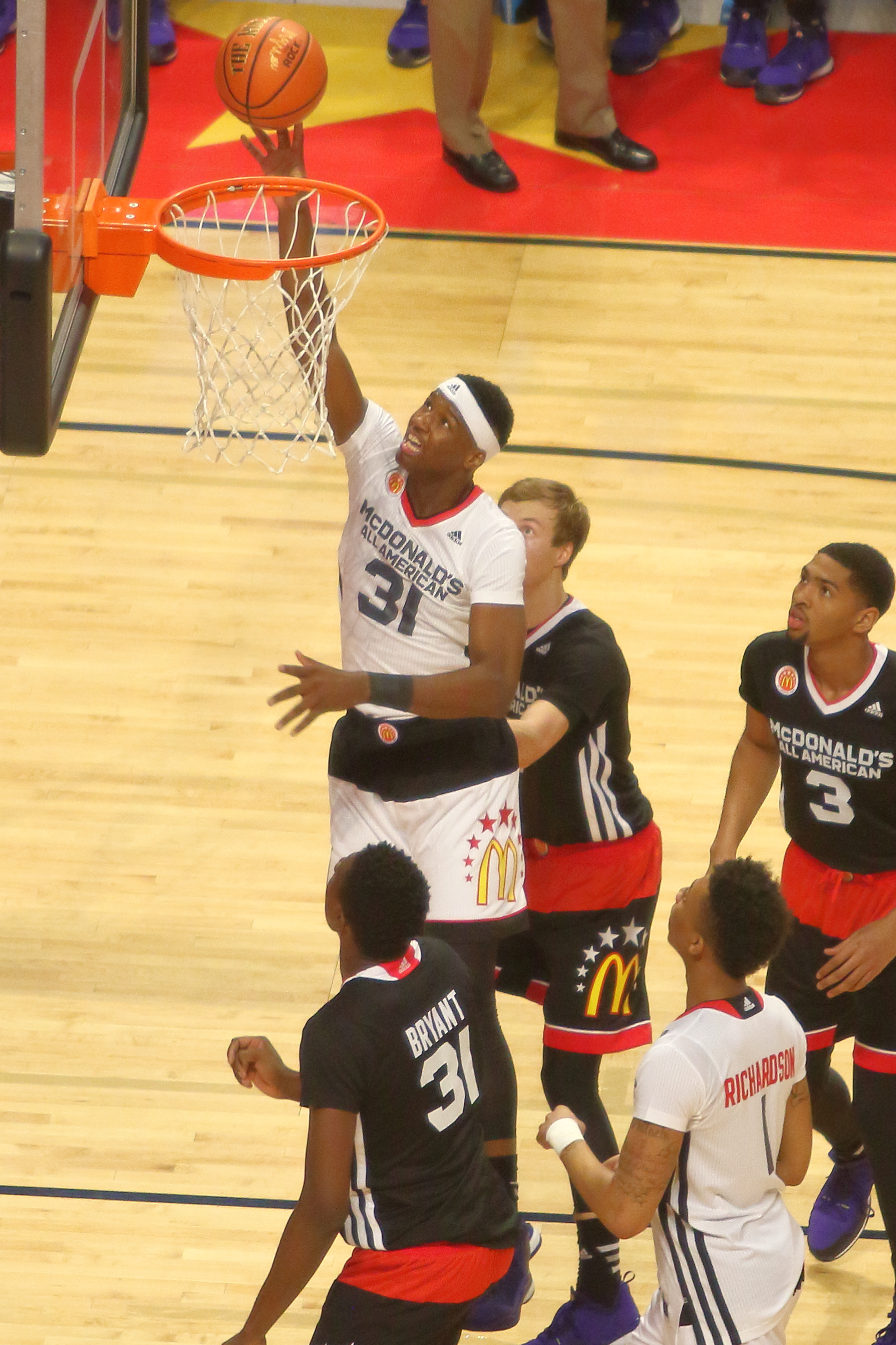
Carlton Bragg Jr.

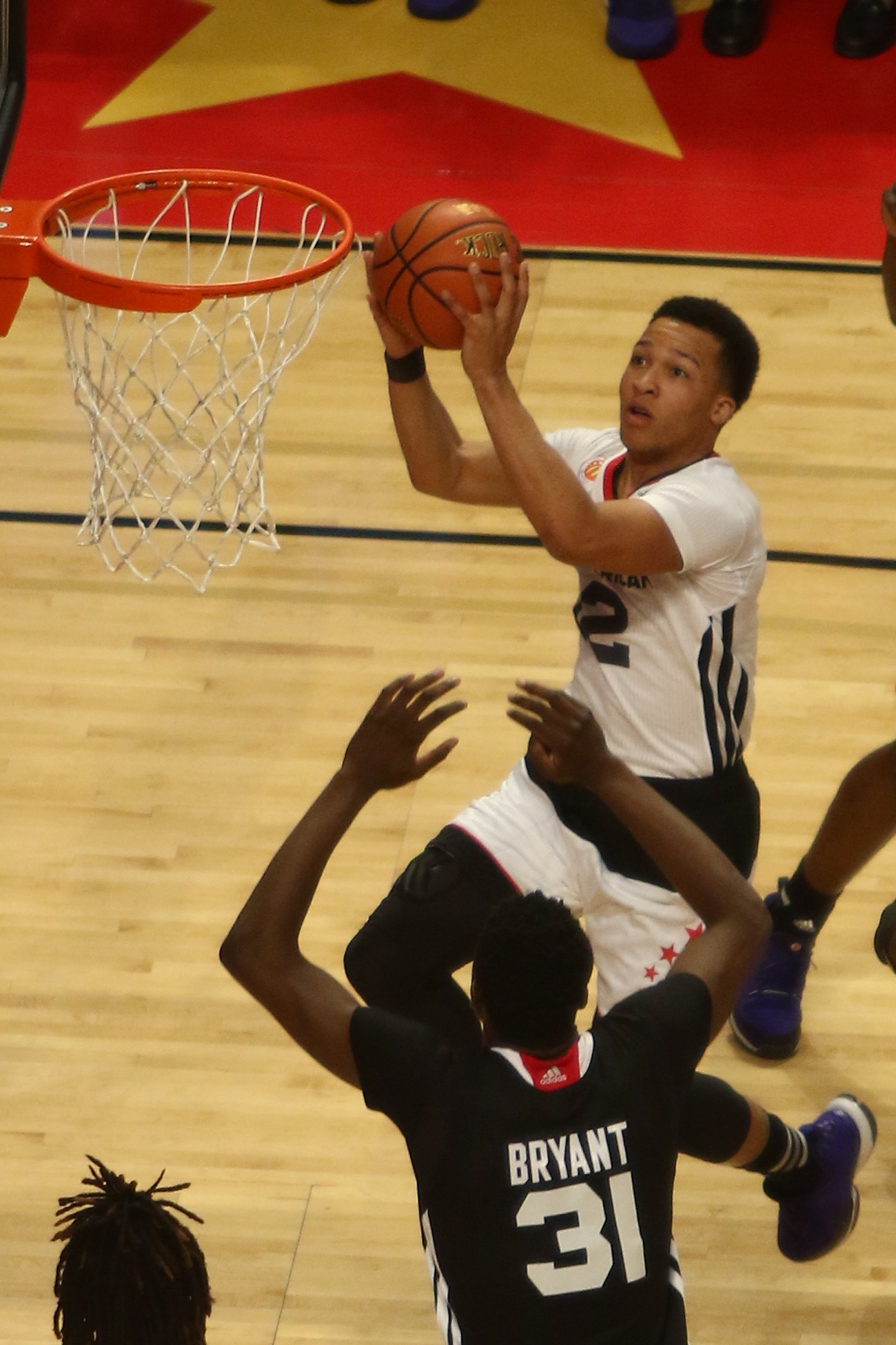
Jalen Brunson

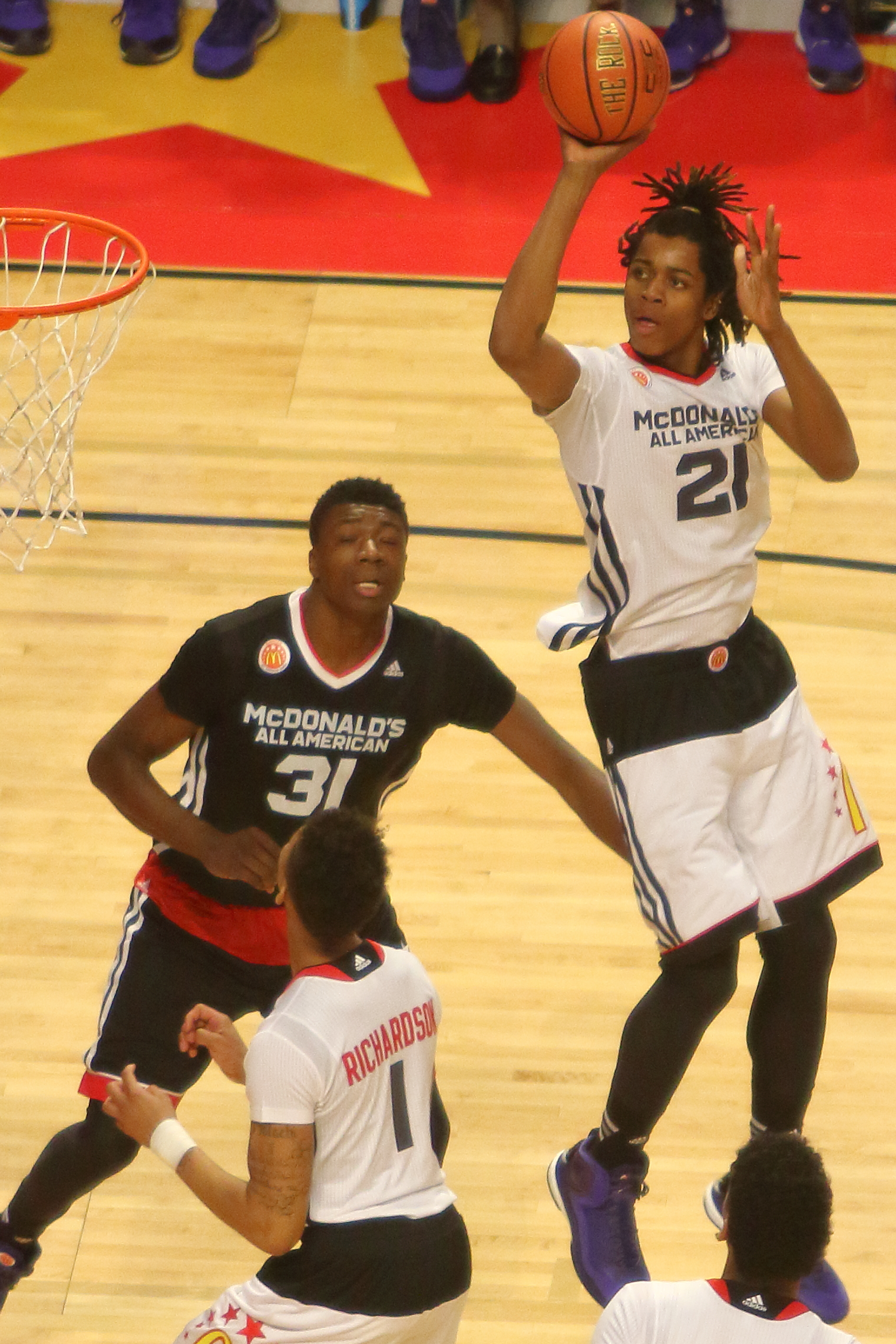
Deyonta Davis

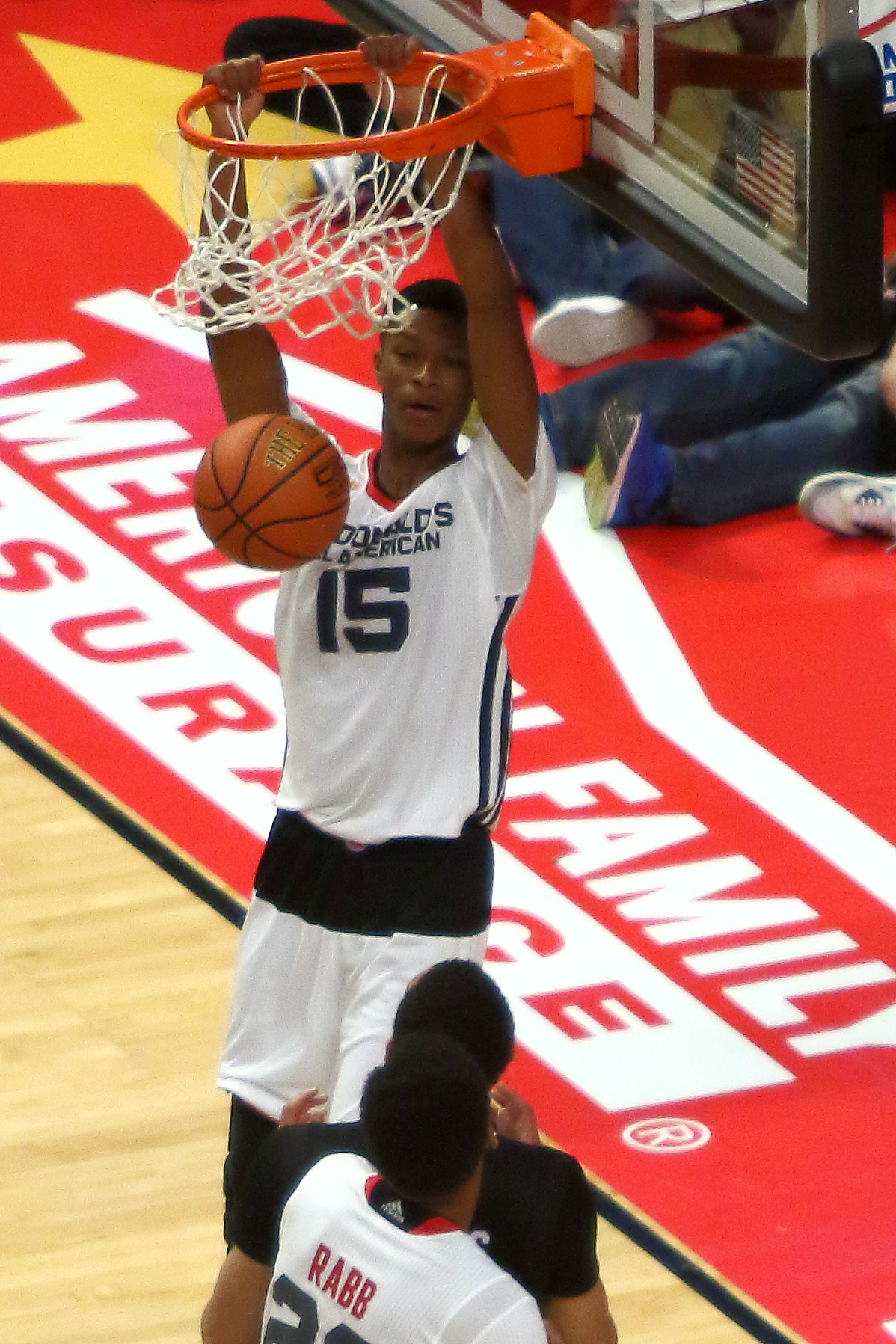
PJ Dozier

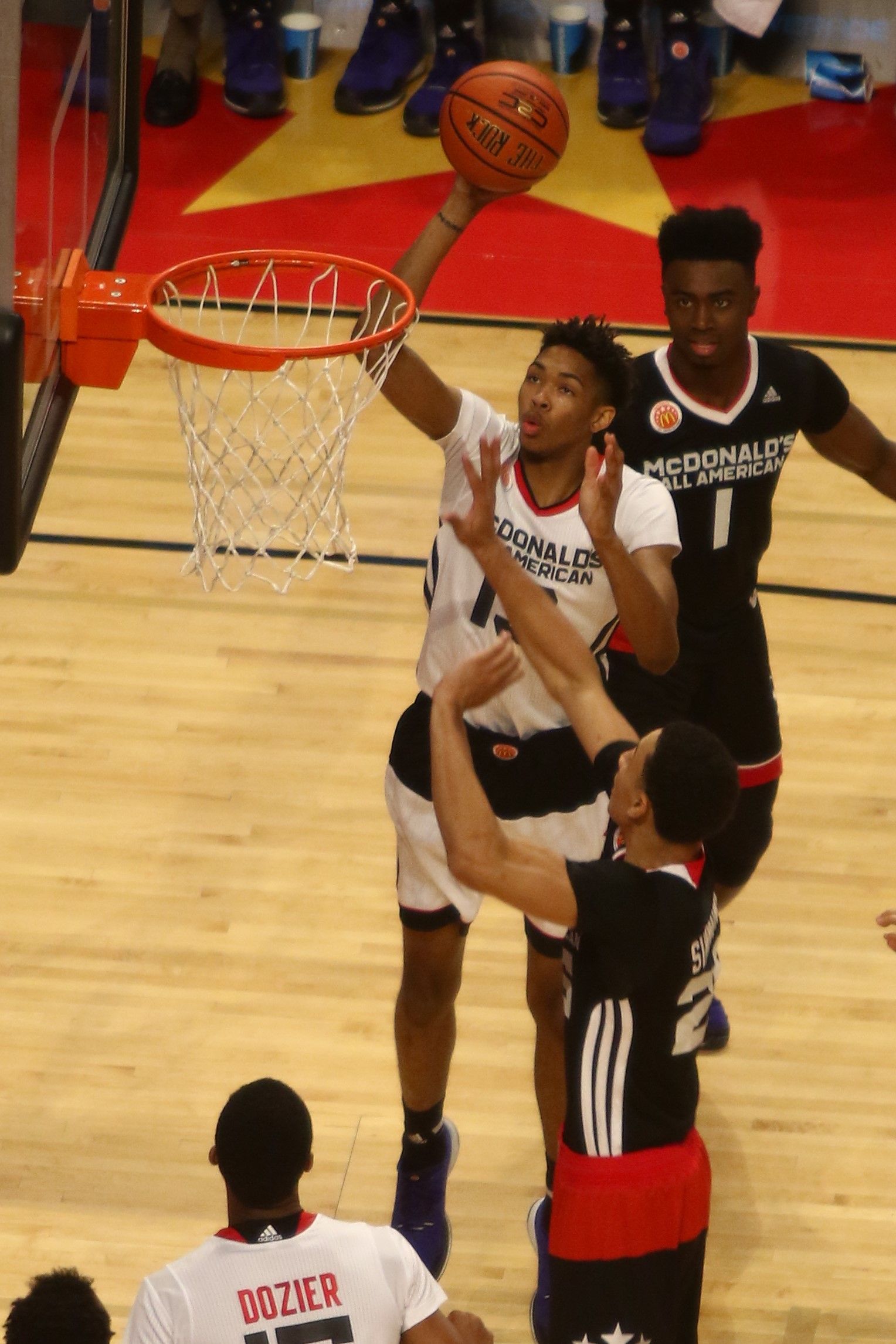
Brandon Ingram

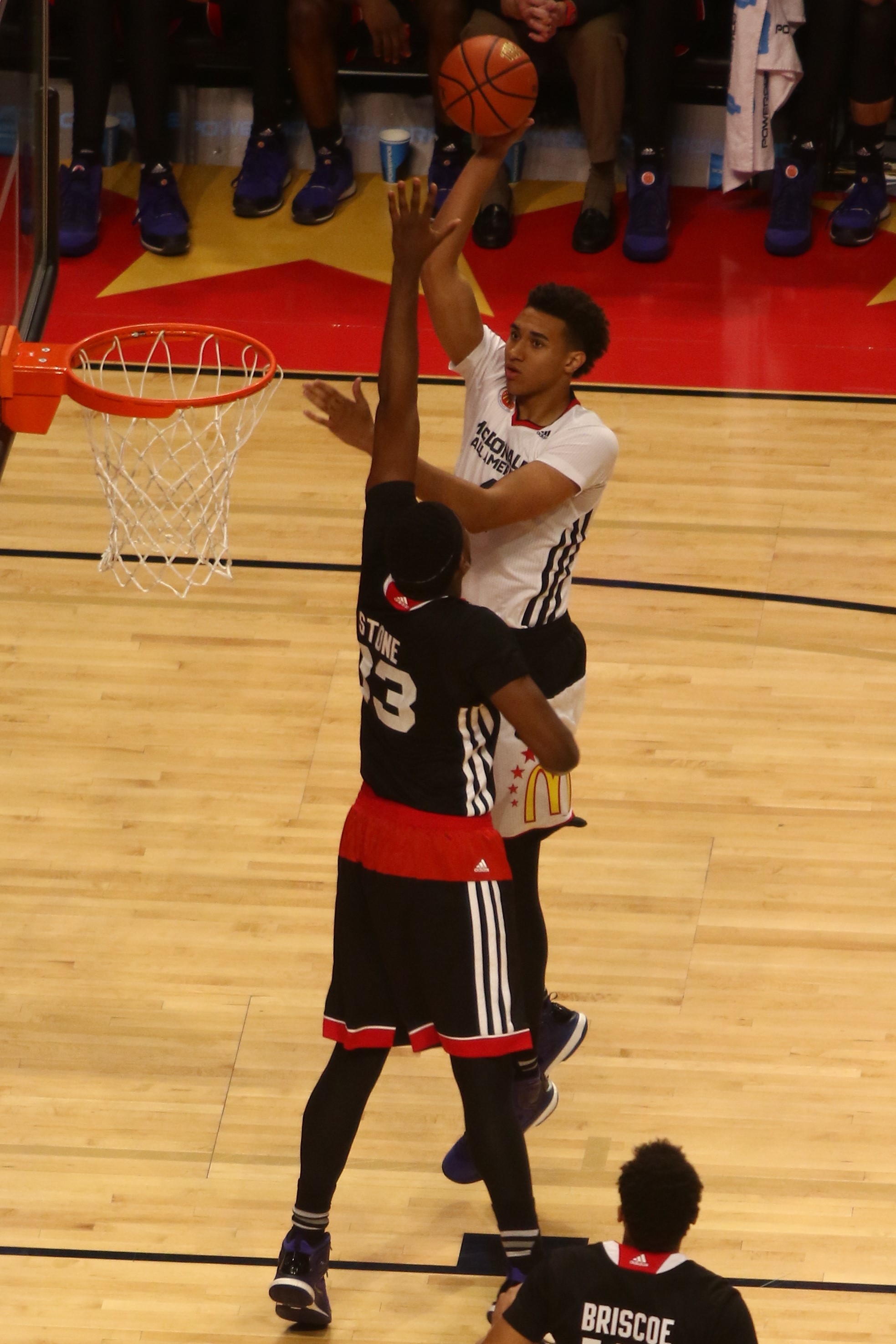
Chase Jeter

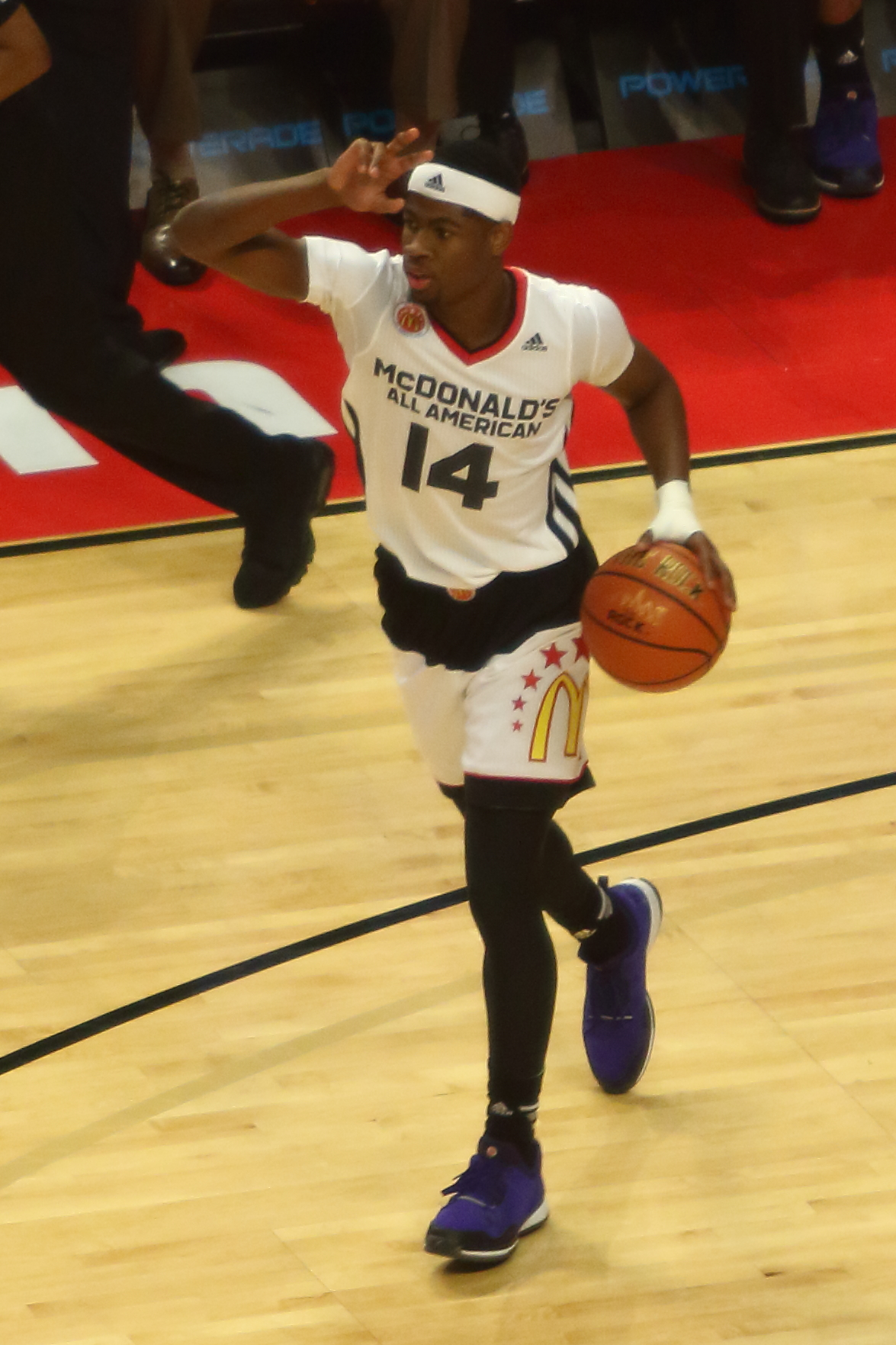
Malik Newman

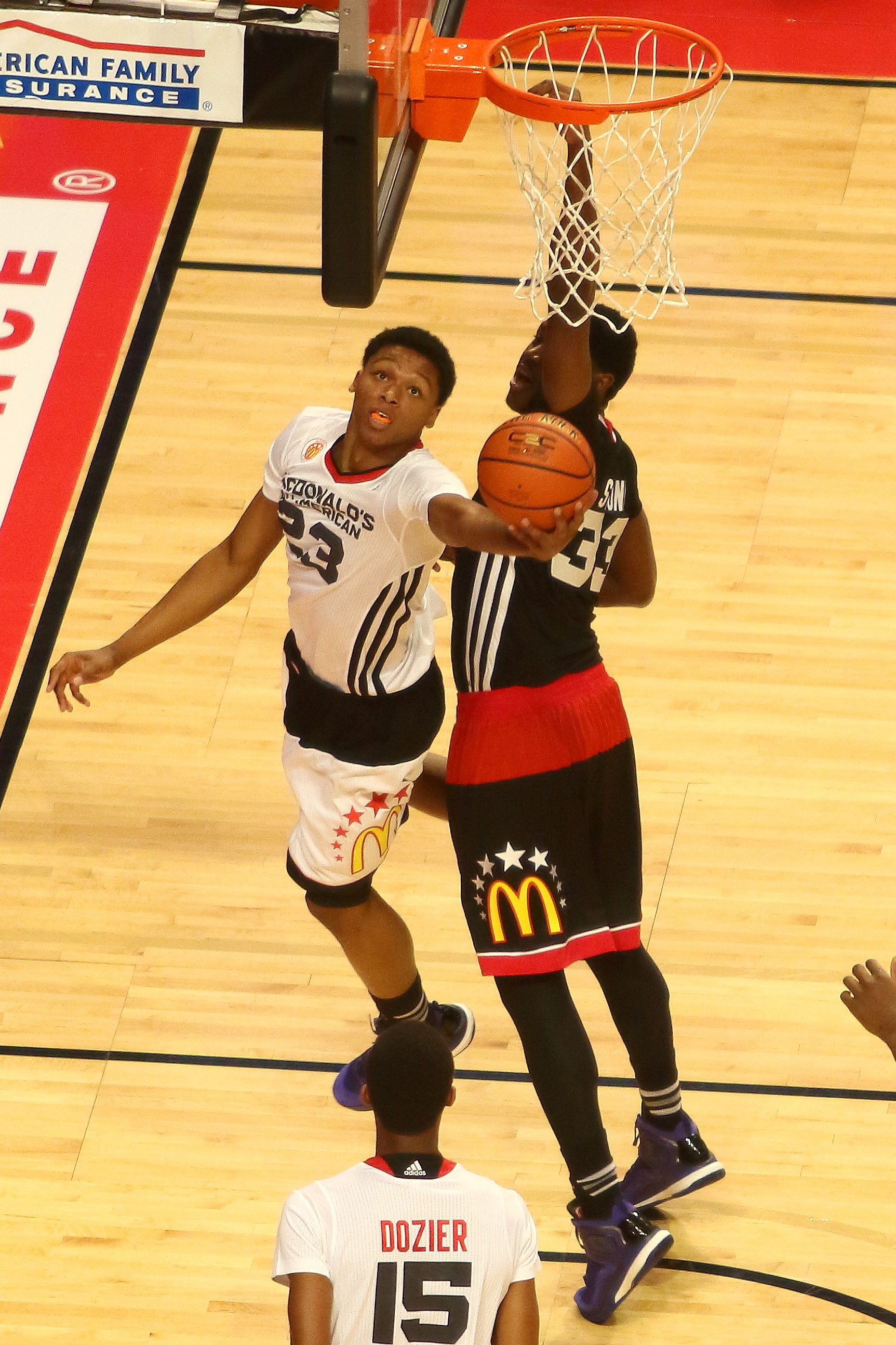
Ivan Rabb

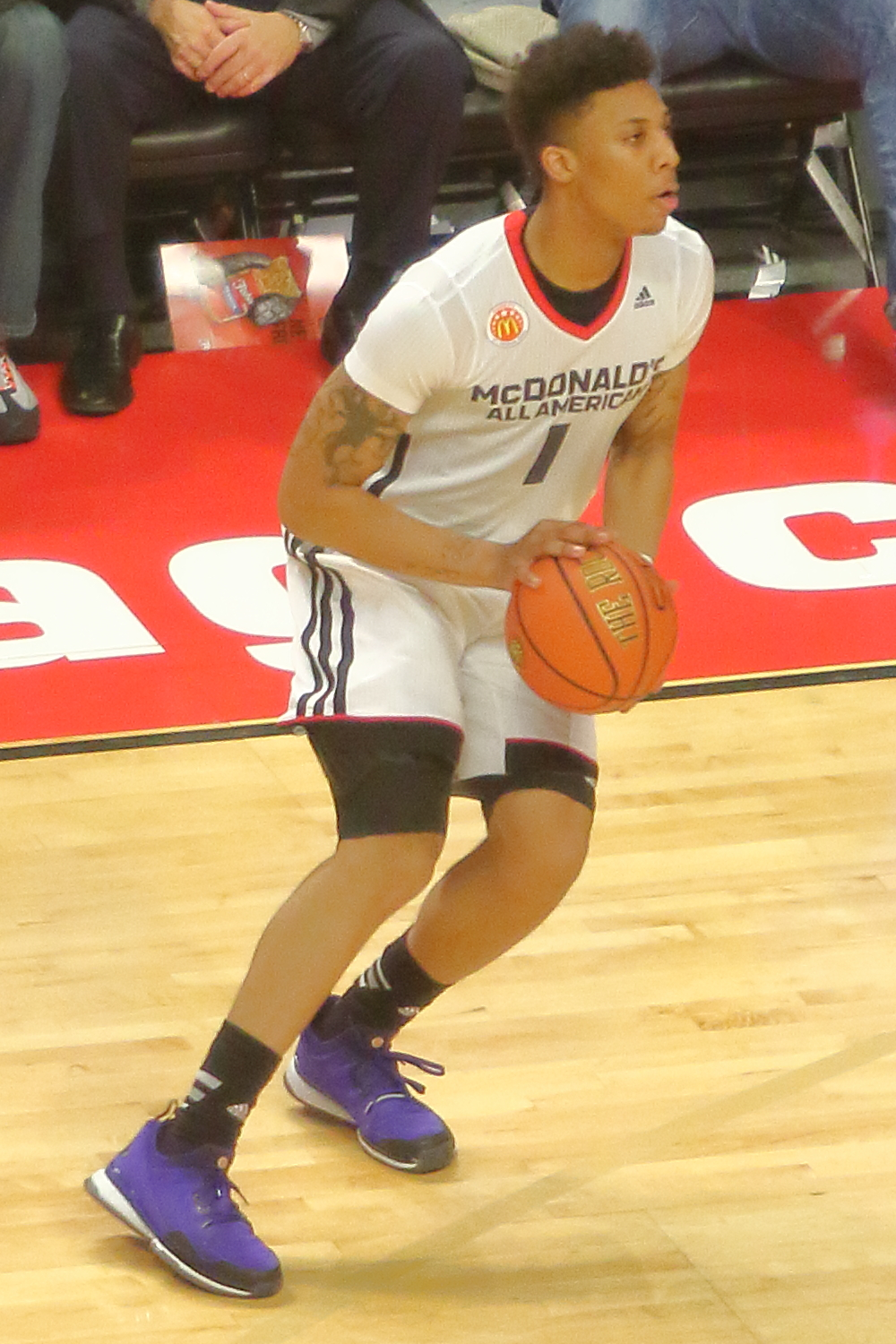
Malachi Richardson

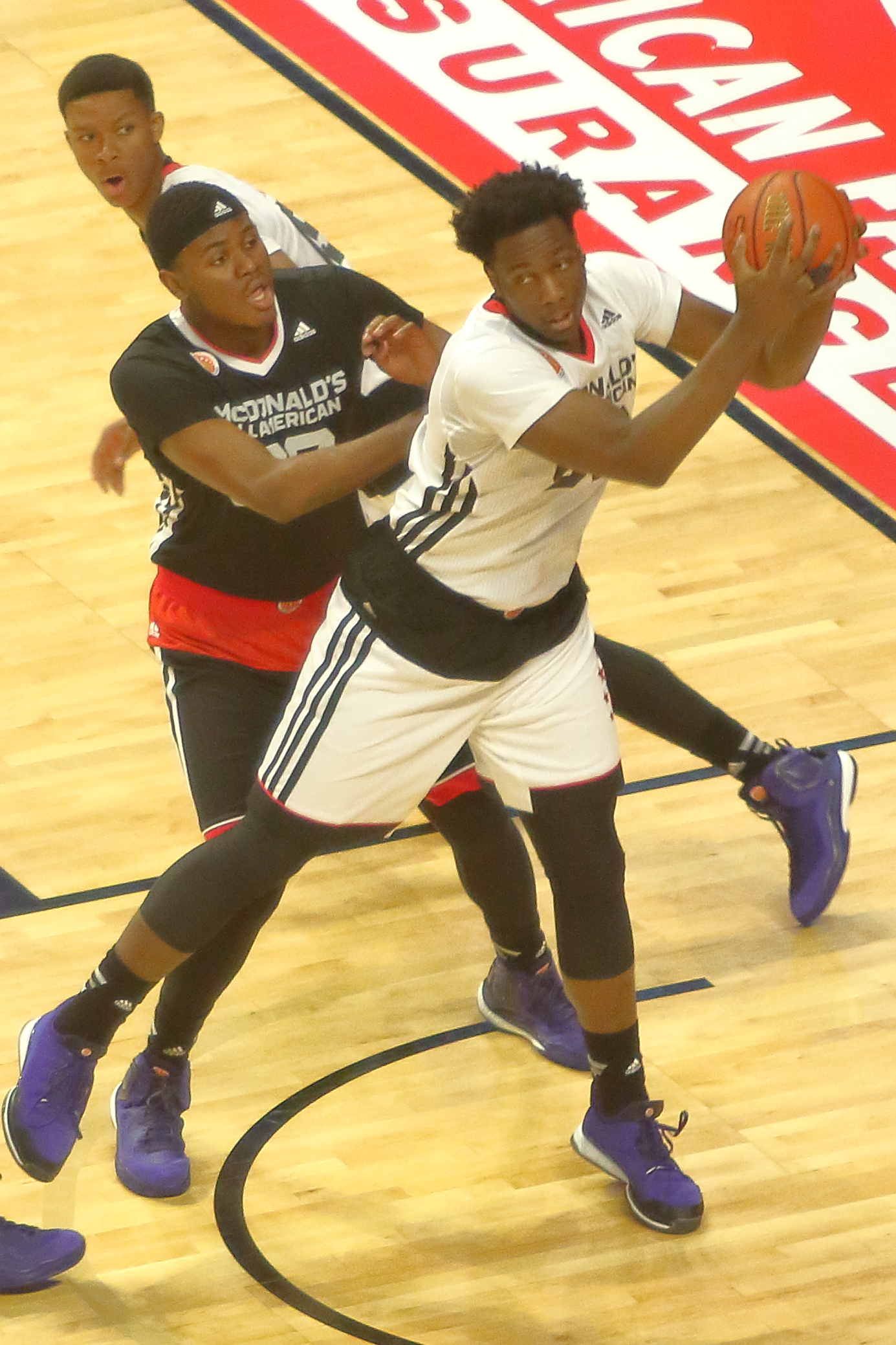
Caleb Swanigan

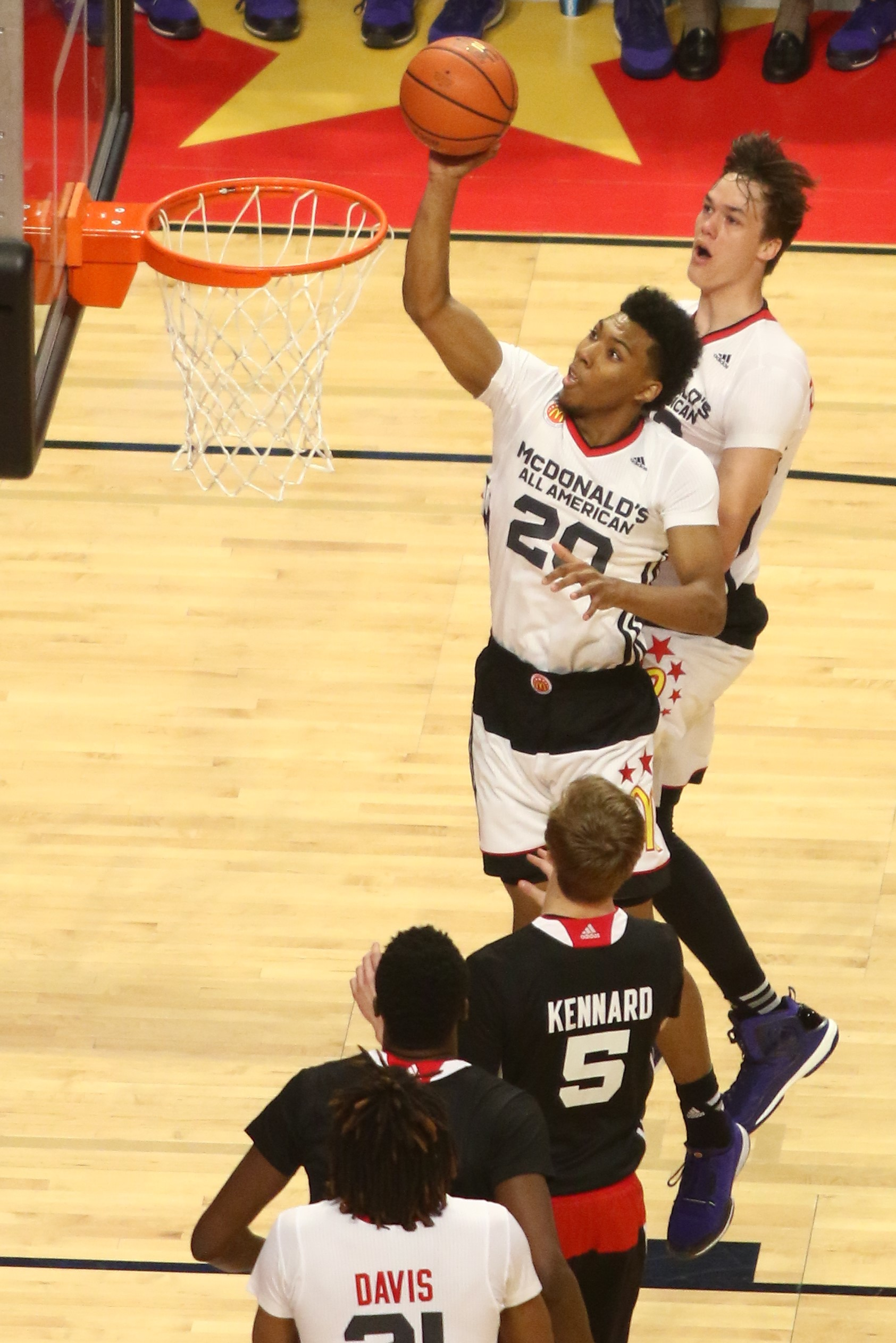
Allonzo Trier

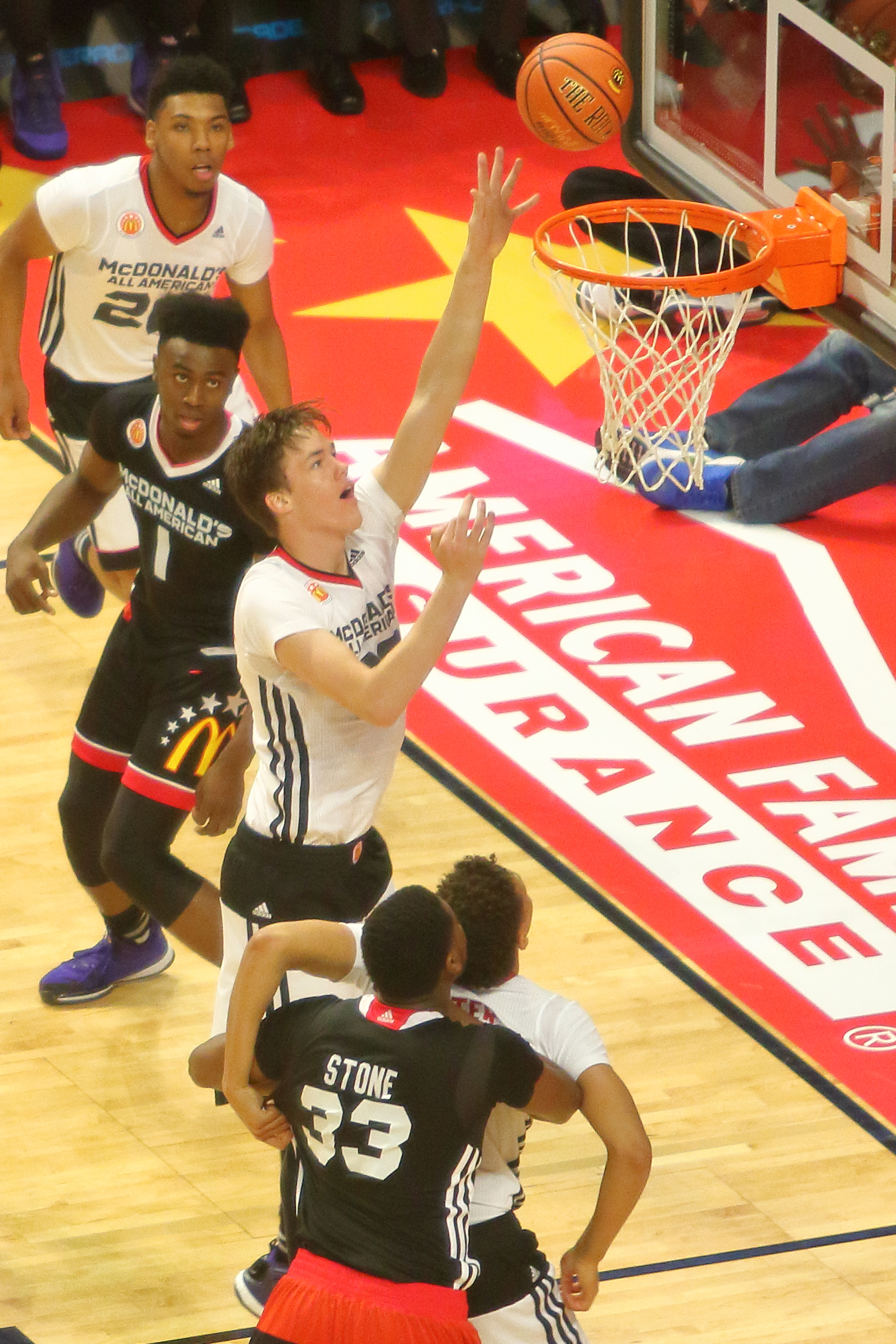
Stephen Zimmerman

Bruce Kelley of the Bullis School in Potomac, Maryland coached the East team, while Robert Smith of Chicago's Simeon Career Academy coached the West team.

== Results ==
The East defeated the West by a 111–91 score. Cheick Diallo earned MVP of the game after posting 18 points and 10 rebounds, for the East team. Five East team players (Diallo, Antonio Blakeney, Diamond Stone, Dwayne Bacon, and Isaiah Briscoe) and four West team players (Allonzo Trier, Brandon Ingram, PJ Dozier, and Ivan Rabb) reached double figures in scoring.

ESPN

April 1, 2015
08:30

Boxscore

East	111–91	West
Scoring by half: 49–46, 62–45
Pts: Cheick Diallo 18; Rebs: Diallo/Ben Simmons 10; Asts: Jawun Evans 4		Pts: Allonzo Trier 17; Rebs: Deyonta Davis 9 Asts: Malik Newman 5

United Center, Chicago, IL
Referees: Steve Honacki, John Washo, Kevin Grayer
