= Stephen Zimmerman =

American basketball player (born 1996)

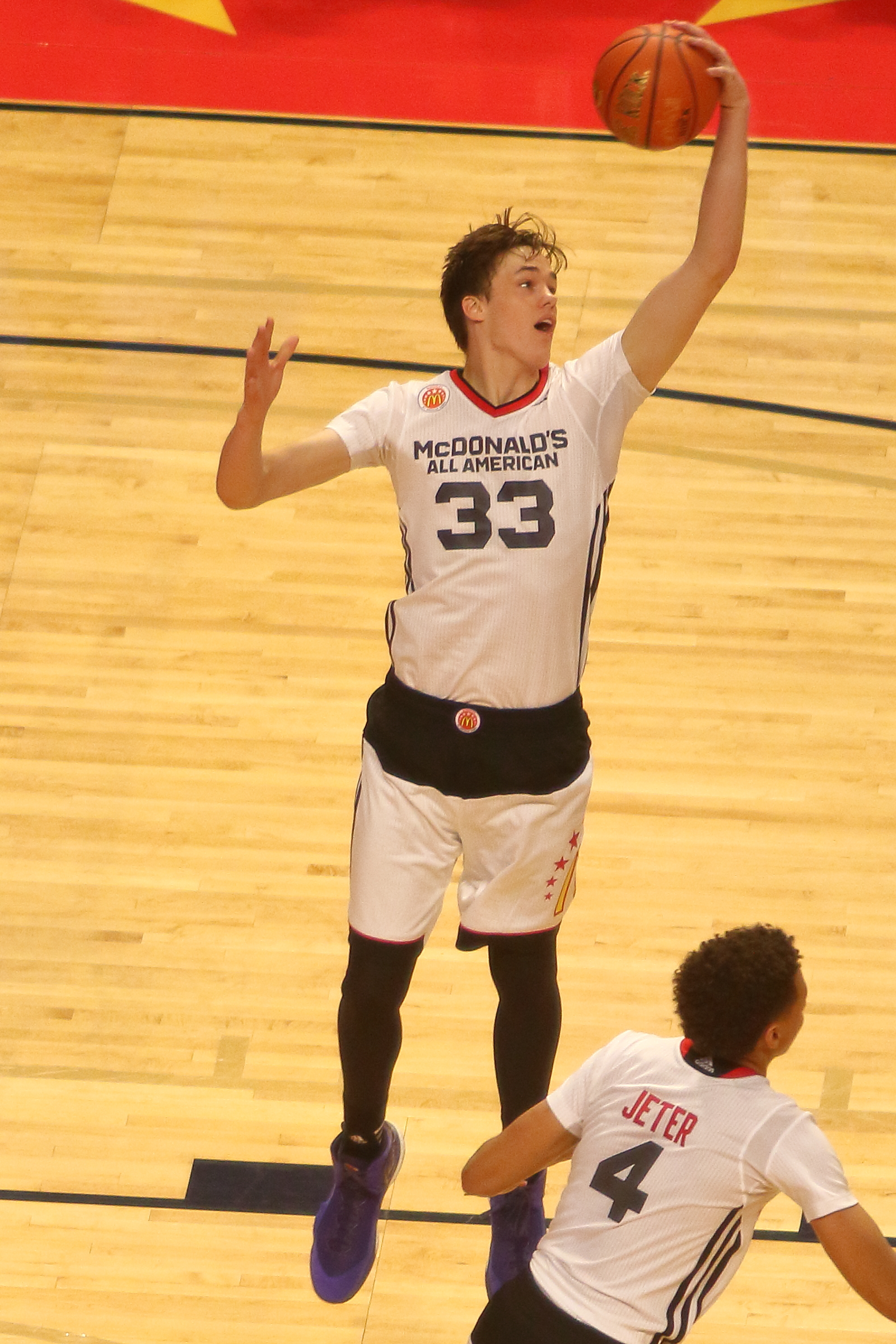
- Zimmerman grabbing a rebound in the 2015 McDonald's All-American Game

Shandong Honey Badger
- Position: Center
- League: NBL

Personal information
- Born: September 9, 1996 (age 30) Hendersonville, Tennessee, U.S.
- Listed height: 7 ft 0 in (2.13 m)
- Listed weight: 240 lb (109 kg)

Career information
- High school: Bishop Gorman (Las Vegas, Nevada)
- College: UNLV (2015–2016)
- NBA draft: 2016: 2nd round, 41st overall pick
- Drafted by: Orlando Magic
- Playing career: 2016–present

Career history
- 2016–2017: Orlando Magic
- 2016–2017: →Erie BayHawks
- 2017–2018: South Bay Lakers
- 2018–2019: Westchester Knicks
- 2019–2020: Telekom Baskets Bonn
- 2020–2021: Nymburk
- 2021–2022: Cairns Taipans
- 2022: Austin Spurs
- 2023: Rizing Zephyr Fukuoka
- 2023: Capitanes de Arecibo
- 2023–2024: Taipei Fubon Braves
- 2024: NS Matrix Deers
- 2024–2025: Bambitious Nara
- 2025–2026: Changsha Yongsheng
- 2026: Vancouver Bandits
- 2026-present: Shandong Honey Badger

Career highlights
- McDonald's All-American (2015)
- Stats at NBA.com
- Stats at Basketball Reference
Medals
Men's basketball
Representing the United States
FIBA Americas U18 Championship
Gold medal – first place	2014 United States	National team
FIBA AmeriCup
Bronze medal – third place	2022 Brazil

Stephen Eric Zimmerman Jr. (born September 9, 1996) is an American professional basketball player for Shandong Honey Badger of the Chinese National Basketball League. He played college basketball for UNLV before being selected with the 41st overall pick in the 2016 NBA draft by the Orlando Magic.

== High school career ==
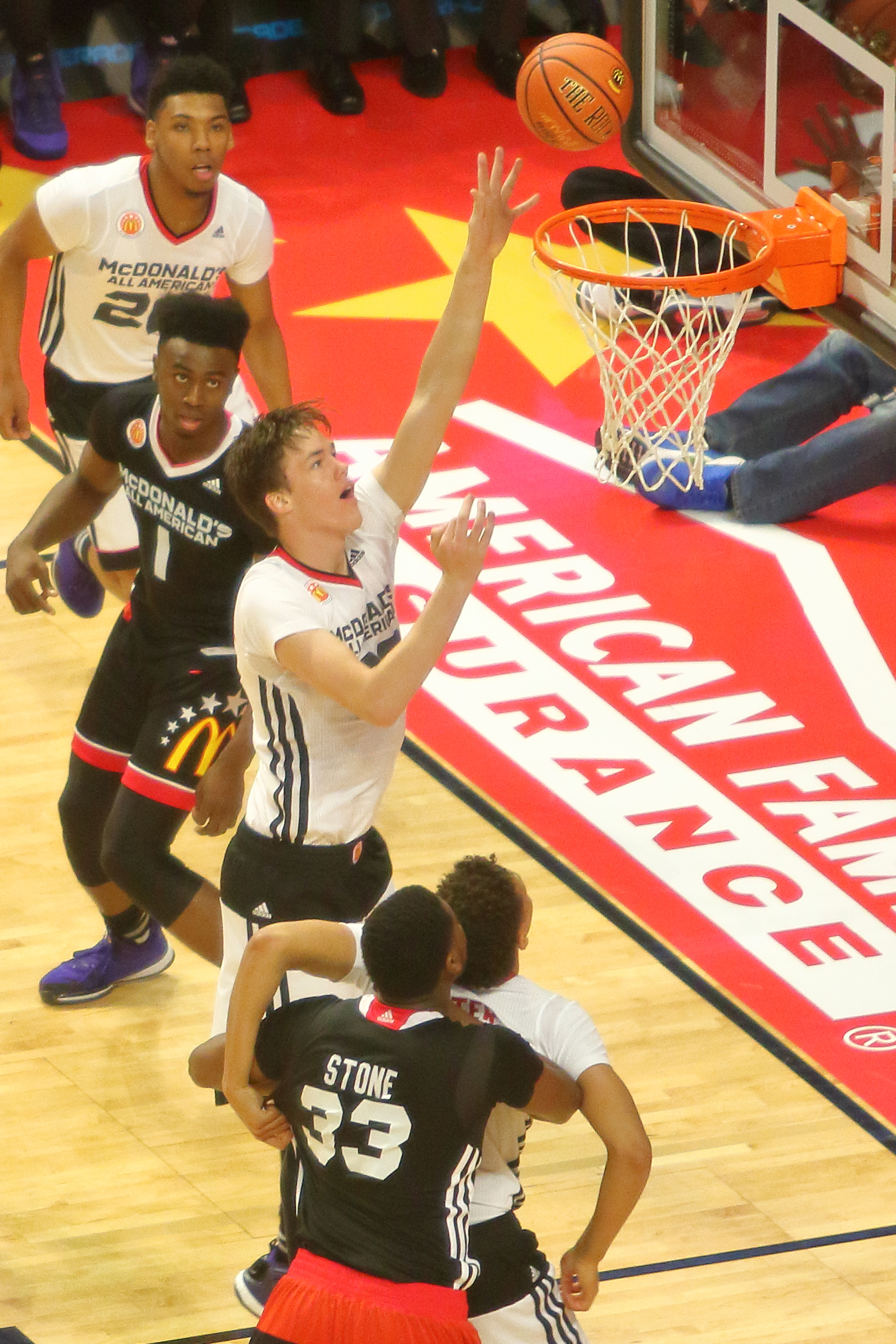
Zimerman in the 2015 McDonald's All-American Game

Zimmerman attended Bishop Gorman High School in Las Vegas, Nevada, where he led the Gaels to four straight state championships, becoming the only player in Nevada history to accomplish the feat at the large-school level. His 114 career wins also made him the winningest player in school history. As a senior in 2014–15, Zimmerman averaged 14.7 points, 10.1 rebounds, 4.2 assists, 1.2 steals and 2.4 blocks per game. He subsequently earned selection to the McDonald's All-American Game and the Jordan Brand Classic.

== College career ==
Zimmerman played one season of college basketball for UNLV. As a freshman in 2015–16, he played in 26 games, made 24 starts, and averaged 10.5 points, a team-high 8.7 rebounds and a team-high 1.96 blocks in 26.2 minutes per game. He ranked second in the Mountain West Conference in blocked shots and third in rebounding. He scored in double figures 17 times, including a career-high 21 points on February 2 against New Mexico. Zimmerman pulled down double-figure rebounds 13 times, including a career-best 16 boards on January 19 against Utah State.

On March 28, 2016, Zimmerman declared for the NBA draft, forgoing his final three years of college eligibility.

== Professional career ==
=== Orlando Magic (2016–2017) ===
On June 23, 2016, Zimmerman was selected by the Orlando Magic with the 41st overall pick in the 2016 NBA draft. On July 7, 2016, he signed with the Magic. During his rookie season, Zimmerman had multiple assignments with the Erie BayHawks, the Magic's G-League affiliate. He also played in 19 games with Orlando, averaging 1.2 points, 1.8 rebounds and 5.7 minutes per game. On July 4, 2017, Zimmerman was waived by the Magic.

=== South Bay Lakers (2017–2018) ===
On August 9, 2017, Zimmerman signed with the Los Angeles Lakers. On October 9, 2017, he was waived by the Lakers. He would later be acquired by the South Bay Lakers of the NBA G League as an affiliate player of Los Angeles.

=== Westchester Knicks (2018–2019) ===
On August 22, 2018, Zimmerman was selected by the Capital City Go-Go of the G League in the 2018 expansion draft. The next day he was traded to the Westchester Knicks for Chasson Randle.

=== Telekom Baskets Bonn (2019–2020) ===
On August 7, 2019, Zimmerman joined Telekom Baskets Bonn. He averaged 7.4 points and 4.3 rebounds per game.

=== Basketball Nymburk (2020–2021) ===
On September 1, 2020, Zimmerman signed with Polski Cukier Toruń of the Polish Basketball League (PLK). On September 17, he signed with Basketball Nymburk of the Czech National Basketball League.

=== Cairns Taipans (2021–2022) ===
On September 17, 2021, Zimmerman signed with the Cairns Taipans for the 2021–22 NBL season.

=== Austin Spurs (2022) ===
On October 18, 2022, Zimmerman signed with the Austin Spurs of the NBA G League. On November 18, he was waived after appearing in 1 game, recording 8 points, 9 rebounds and 9 personal fouls.

== NBA career statistics ==
Legend
GP	Games played	GS	Games started	MPG	Minutes per game
FG%	Field goal percentage	3P%	3-point field goal percentage	FT%	Free throw percentage
RPG	Rebounds per game	APG	Assists per game	SPG	Steals per game
BPG	Blocks per game	PPG	Points per game	**Bold**	Career high

=== Regular season ===
Year	Team	GP	GS	MPG	FG%	3P%	FT%	RPG	APG	SPG	BPG	PPG
2016–17	Orlando	19	0	5.7	.323	.000	.600	1.8	.2	.1	.3	1.2
Career		19	0	5.7	.323	.000	.600	1.8	.2	.1	.3	1.2
