= Murder of Ben Wilson =

17-year old Chicago high school basketball player killed in November 1984

Ben Wilson, an American high school basketball star from Neal F. Simeon High School in Chicago, Illinois, US, was shot in the neighborhood surrounding the school during its lunch hour on Tuesday, November 20, 1984. Wilson died from injuries sustained in the shooting the following morning.

== Background ==
At the time of the shooting, Wilson was seventeen years old and had just started his senior year at Simeon. As a junior, he had led the Simeon Wolverines basketball team to the Illinois Class AA state championship, and over the summer he was given the honor of being ranked as the best high school player in the entire nation.

== Day of the shooting ==
=== Domestic problem ===
In spite of all the accolades that were bestowed upon him, Wilson's personal life was growing complicated. During his junior year, he and his girlfriend Jetun Rush conceived a child. Rush gave birth to the child, a boy named Brandon, over the summer. Almost immediately thereafter, she became withdrawn from Wilson and largely focused on taking care of the baby.

Wilson did not fully understand why Rush had pushed him away and as time went on, it started to have an effect on him. As the school year started, Wilson was beginning to grow more and more frustrated by the situation and his interactions with Rush became significantly tense, to the point where they were having loud arguments in the school hallways between classes. Wilson's temper eventually would get the best of him as he shoved a teacher to the floor when the teacher tried to break up another argument between the two.

As the Simeon student body began preparing for lunch period on November 20, Wilson elected to try and talk to Rush again instead of eating with his teammates as he usually did. Once again, Rush was not interested. Wilson persisted, though, and followed her as she began walking up the street outside Simeon.

=== Billy Moore and Omar Dixon arrive at Simeon ===
As this was going on, two students from nearby Calumet High School, Billy Moore and Omar Dixon, had made their way to the school. Moore and Dixon had cut school that day, and Moore had a .22 caliber pistol in his possession. Moore's cousin had been robbed of $10, allegedly by a student of Simeon, and he brought the gun with him to avenge his cousin. The conflict, however, was resolved before Moore got there.

The two boys then decided to hang out for a little while and wait to see if Erica Murphy, Wilson's classmate and a friend of Moore's, was around. Murphy met up with the two boys shortly thereafter, and Moore and Dixon followed her to a luncheonette on South Vincennes Avenue. Murphy went in alone, while Moore and Dixon chose to wait outside.

=== The shooting ===
Shortly after Murphy entered the luncheonette, Wilson inadvertently bumped into Moore since he had not been paying attention to where he was going, instead trying to talk to his estranged girlfriend. Moore yelled up the street at Wilson to watch where he was going. Wilson turned and went back toward Moore, with an argument leading to Moore eventually drawing the pistol. He shot Wilson twice, with one bullet striking his groin and the other nicking his abdominal aorta. Moore and Dixon fled the scene, with Moore seeking refuge at Murphy's home.

== Aftermath of the shooting ==
At 12:37 PM local time, a call was placed to 911 for emergency assistance. It took paramedics forty minutes to arrive at the scene, and to further complicate matters Chicago emergency protocol in place forced the ambulance to take Wilson to the closest available hospital. That hospital, St. Bernard Hospital in the Englewood section, was not equipped to handle major trauma cases and thus Wilson was not able to be seen by a doctor for several hours. His condition progressively worsened during the hours that followed, which led his mother, Mary, to have her son taken off of life support. Early the next morning, November 21, Wilson died.

=== The team's decision ===
After word reached Simeon of the shooting, all of the members of the basketball team were called out of their classes and brought into the teachers' lounge where they were kept for the rest of that day. They were informed of their teammate's condition as it became available, with initial reports being positive but subsequent ones growing grimmer and grimmer as the hours wore on. Once they were informed that Wilson had died, his teammates were asked whether or not they wanted to go forward with their season opener, which was scheduled for later on that day against the team they defeated to win the state championship in 1984, Evanston Township; they won the game.

== Arrest and trial ==
Billy Moore remained at Erica Murphy's home for most of the rest of the day. Later that night, Chicago police arrested him there and shortly thereafter apprehended Omar Dixon. The two boys were brought into interrogation rooms and questioned by detectives for most of the night, eventually signing statements of confession. In these statements, Moore and Dixon said that the shooting was part of a robbery, where Dixon picked Wilson's pockets and once he was done, he ordered Moore to shoot Wilson twice. Both of these statements were later recanted, but the boys were still charged with murder after questioning and the state of Illinois elected to try them both as adults due to the serious nature of their actions.

The trial began in the fall of 1985. State Attorneys Kenneth Malatesta and Arthur Hill presided over the prosecution and presented the police's theory, which was in the confessions that were recanted. The prosecution's lead witness was Jetun Rush, who testified to that effect. The prosecutors also tried to introduce evidence that the boys were members of a street gang, but were precluded from doing so.

The defense attorneys for both boys denied the charges vehemently. Dixon's attorney, Brian Dosch, called his client's confession "garbage" and destroyed a copy of it in front of reporters. Isaiah Gant, Moore's attorney, argued that his client was only trying to protect himself from the much larger Wilson. He also expressed that he felt both of the defendants were being "railroaded" by overzealous law enforcement officials whose desperation to hold someone accountable for the murder of a star athlete compromised their integrity and led them to create false case theory.

Malatesta, in response to these charges, chose instead to focus on the actions that led to Wilson's death. In his closing on October 11, 1985, he urged the jury to focus less on the celebrity of the victim and simply follow the law. The jury was only out for about one hour before returning guilty verdicts against both Moore and Dixon. A month later, Moore was sentenced to 40 years in prison while Dixon received 30.

== Aftermath ==
The 1984-85 team, which would have seen Wilson team with future NBA star Nick Anderson (whom he convinced to transfer to Simeon), went 28-2 without their captain. They advanced to the state 2A quarterfinals before losing to Lanphier High School of Springfield. The Wolverines did not win another state title in the 20th century.

For some time after Wilson was killed, Simeon issued his number 25 jersey to the player on the team that they deemed the best. After Derrick Rose graduated from Simeon in 2007, the school stopped issuing the number. In 2009, it was retired in honor of both Rose and Wilson. Later on, Jabari Parker suggested that Wilson's name and number be stitched into the sneakers the players were issued.

Omar Dixon's conviction was struck down on appeal and he received a new trial in 1989, but was again convicted. He was released on parole in 2000. In 2007 he was arrested again and charged with three weapons offenses, for which he began serving a 40-year sentence in 2011. Billy Moore appealed his conviction but did not do so until 1992 as he was unaware his sentence was not automatically appealed. He claimed his sentence was excessive, considering he had not been in trouble before, and that he should not have been tried as an adult. While the court of appeals found his sentence to be somewhat harsh, they upheld the decision as a matter of law. He eventually received parole in 2005.

Jetun Rush graduated from Simeon and Central State University as a member of Delta Sigma Theta sorority. She settled in New York, where she married Edward Rivers. Brandon Sherrod Wilson, Jetun and Ben's son, became a star player at Riverside Church and St. Francis Prep, and Long Island Lutheran High School and was recruited by the University of Maryland Eastern Shore, where he played one season.

Brandon eventually pursued a career in law enforcement and became a police officer in Port Washington, New York. He served for five years on the PWPD force. He was killed in a single-car crash on the Northern State Parkway near East Hempstead, New York in January 2022, after losing control of his vehicle.

The life and murder of Ben Wilson was featured in two documentary films produced in the 21st century. The first, directed by Coodie and Chike and produced in association with ESPN Films, was titled Benji and made its debut at the 2012 Tribeca Film Festival. Billy Moore appears in the film to give his side of the story for the first time. He reiterated the claim made by his attorney at his trial, that he only shot Wilson out of fear for his own life. He said that Wilson "dared" him to shoot once he pulled the .22 out and that he felt Wilson was just "punking" him by taunting him. Moore also said that Dixon had nothing to do with the shooting.

In 2020, Two Sides of the Gun: A Story of Reconciliation was screened in Chicago during NBA All-Star Weekend festivities. At the screening, Billy Moore and Ben Wilson's brothers Anthony and Jeffrey appeared onstage together and the two Wilsons publicly forgave Moore for his action. This was the dying wish of Mary Wilson, who died at the age of 63 in December 2000.
