= Live Footage =

American electro-acoustic act

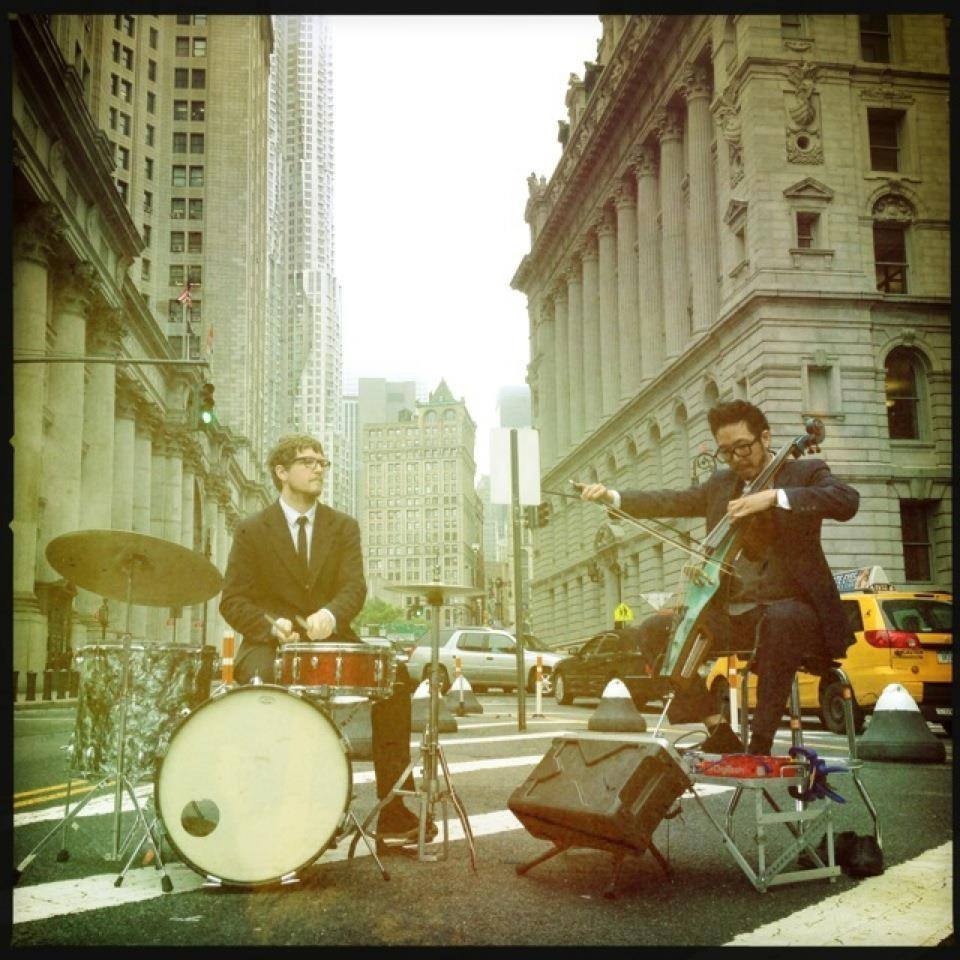

Background information
- Origin: Brooklyn, New York, USA
- Genres: Cinematic, Classical, Electronic, Hip-Hop, Indie Pop, Jazz
- Years active: 2008–present
- Members: Topu Lyo; Mike Thies

Live Footage is an American electro-acoustic, improvisational music act. It consists of cellist and electronic musician, Topu Lyo, and drummer/multi instrumentalist, Mike Thies.

Lyo plays cello, incorporating the use of live loops and a handful of electronics and synthesizers. Thies plays drums and keyboards simultaneously. They have held a residency at Apotheke in NYC’s Chinatown since 2010. Improvisation was the basis of this approach.

Live Footage has been described by Wall Street Journal as one of the finest "surrealist soundtrack composers" in the making by scoring some of the most eclectic contemporary pieces in film, fashion, dance and in tune composing their own music. They have shared bills with notable artists such as Emily Wells, Dan the Automator, Robert Glasper, and Pharaoh Monch. They have also performed for Charity Water’s live event in San Francisco raising over 7 million dollars to build water wells in Ethiopia.

Having composed music for numerous commercial projects for notable brands including KC Chiefs, Van Cleef & Arpels, UNICEF, Red Bull, Rag & Bone, and BMW to name a few, Live Footage has provided original scores for numerous films, including Ali: The People's Champ. As regular collaborators of directing duo Coodie & Chike, Live Footage was recently tapped to compose the original score for the Emmy Nominated Kanye West Trilogy - “Jeen-Yuhs” released on Netflix in 2022. They composed the score for 4 part series on Hulu "After Baywatch: Moment In The Sun" directed by Matthew Felker in 2024. In 2025 they composed the score for a documentary about NBA star Tim Duncan "The Boy From St. Croix" directed by his brother Scott Duncan, and well as "Beam Me Up, Sulu" directed by Timour Gregory and Sasha Schneider. Sulu is a documentary about Star Trek's George Takei. It was selected at the 2025 Raindance Film Festival.

Most recently, they teamed up with J.M Harper to score the documentary "Soul Patrol". It premiered at the Sundance Film Festival in 2026, where Harper won the U.S. documentary director's award. It is an adaptation of Ed Emanuel's book of the same name about the first all African American highly skilled regiment (called LRRP's - Long Range Reconnaissance Patrol) in the Vietnam War.

== Discography ==
=== Studio albums ===
- Live Footage (2009)
- Willow Be (2010)
- Plays Jay Dee (2011)
- Doyers (2014)
- Moods of the Desert (2016)
- Ice Pond (2017)
- The Planetarium (2017)
- Bunker (2017)
- Two Bedroom Flat (2018)
- Unwritten Soundtrack by Live Footage and Danny Meyer(2019)
- jeen-yuhs: A Kanye Trilogy (Soundtrack from the Netflix Series) (2022)
- Live at Apotheke (2023)
- Cello Quartets collaboration with Louis Reith (2024)

=== Film scores ===
- Graceland Original Score (2013)
- Fondi 91 Original Score (2013)
- Good Morning Original Score (2013)
- Muhammad Ali: The People’s Champ Original Score (2015)
- April In Blue Original Score (2017)
- Public Figure Original Score (2019)
- The Sleeping Negro Original Score (2021)
- Jeen-Yuhs Acts 1,2, 3 Original Score (2022)
- After Baywatch 4 Part Series (Moment in the Sun) (2024)
- The Boy From St. Croix (2025)
- Blood and Guts (2025)
- Beam Me Up Sulu (2026)
- Soul Patrol (2026)

=== Other contributions ===
- Emily Wells, Mama Remixed (2012)
- Little Shells, 5 Deep Under/ producers (2015)

=== Commercials ===
- Van Clef & Arpels
- Iceberg
- Rag & Bone
- Visual Lizard
- It Gets Better
- Zamora
- Unicef Series
- BMW
- Volvo
- Red Bull
- Elle Magazine
