= Jeff Jackson =

Jeff Jackson may refer to:

- Jeff Jackson (athlete) (born 1974), hurdler from the United States Virgin Islands
- Jeff Jackson (basketball) (born 1961), basketball coach
- Jeff Jackson (ice hockey, born 1955), ice hockey coach
- Jeff Jackson (ice hockey, born 1965), ice hockey player and executive
- Jeff Jackson (baseball) (born 1972), baseball player
- Jeff Jackson (politician) (born 1982), American politician, attorney general of North Carolina

== See also ==
- Geoffrey Jackson (1915–1987), British diplomat and writer
- Geoffrey Jackson (cricketer) (1894–1917), English cricketer
- Geoffrey W. Jackson (born 1955), member of the Governing Body of Jehovah's Witnesses
- Jackson (name)
