= Calvin Brock (basketball) =

American basketball player (born 1986)

Personal information
- Born: 1986 (age 39–40) Chicago, Illinois, U.S.
- Listed height: 6 ft 6 in (1.98 m)
- Listed weight: 189 lb (86 kg)

Career information
- High school: Simeon Career Academy (Chicago, Illinois)
- College: Illinois (2005–2009)
- NBA draft: 2009: undrafted
- Playing career: 2009–2013
- Position: Forward

Career history
- 2009–2011: Weissenhorn (Germany)
- 2011–2012: Ereliai Mazeikiai (Lithuania)

Career highlights
- Chicago Tribune All-State First-Team 2004; Maui Invitational All-Tournament Team 2007 – 2008

Calvin Brock (born in 1986) is an American professional basketball player from Chicago, Illinois. Brock played star high school ball at Simeon Career Academy of the Chicago Public League. He was a member of the National Honor Society. Leading the Simeon team to the 2004 state Class AA quarterfinals, Brock became a Tribune First-Team All-State selection. He was called "the Public League's best all-around player". He averaged 22 points, 10 rebounds, five steals, four assists and four blocks"

== College career ==
In 2005 he began playing college ball at the University of Illinois wearing number 25, to honor the late Benjamin "Benji" Wilson Jr., as have other Simeon basketball alumni, Nick Anderson and Deon Thomas. In his junior year he scored 258 total points. For his senior year as the sixth man, Brock averaged 4.9 points and 3.0 rebounds in 16.7 minutes per game. He received his bachelor's degree (BS) in Sports Management.

== Professional career ==
When Brock did not get drafted by a National Basketball Association (NBA) team, he started his professional career in Germany. After three seasons of playing basketball professionally in Europe, he tore the LCL in his right knee in 2012. He returned to Chicago for rehabilitation, and during that time, he began contemplating a career in coaching.
