= Old School Love =

Single by Lupe Fiasco featuring Ed Sheeran
- Released: October 14, 2013
- Recorded: 2013
- Genre: Hip-hop
- Length: 4:33
- Label: 1st & 15th Entertainment; Atlantic
- Songwriters: Wasalu Jaco; Edward Sheeran; Justin Franks
- Producer: DJ Frank E

Lupe Fiasco singles chronology
"Poor Decisions" (2013)	"Old School Love" (2013)	"Mission" (2014)

Ed Sheeran singles chronology
"Everything Has Changed" (2013)	"Old School Love" (2013)	"I See Fire" (2013)

"Old School Love" is a song by American hip hop recording artist Lupe Fiasco. The song was released on October 14, 2013, in promotion of his fifth studio album Tetsuo & Youth. English singer Ed Sheeran contributed vocals to the song's hook. The song peaked at number 93 on the US Billboard Hot 100 chart and number 18 on the New Zealand Singles Chart.

== Background ==
In February 2013, English singer-songwriter Ed Sheeran said that he was working in the studio with Lupe Fiasco. He told pressparty, "We have the same A&R in America and he just gave me about seven beats and said write choruses to all of these beats. Lupe loved one of them and is going to hop on it. I'm a massive Lupe Fiasco fan, so it's cool." On October 9, 2013, Fiasco announced that the first single from his fifth studio album Tetsuo & Youth, would be a song featuring Ed Sheeran titled "Old School Love". Along with releasing the cover artwork for the single, he revealed it would be released to iTunes on October 14, 2013.

== Composition ==
In the song, Fiasco professes his love for old-school hip hop through his lyrics, as Ed Sheeran sings the soulful, laid-back hook. Fiasco's lyrics reflect the changes hip-hop has gone through since the 1980s and 1990s, relating hip hop's loss of innocence to the crime and struggle currently plaguing his hometown Chicago. Also, Fiasco gives reasons for his move from making political music and "runs through hip-hop's roots and gently critiques the present" era of hip hop. Additionally, he references The Fat Boys, Melle Mel and pre-Law & Order Ice-T. The DJ Frank E production is backed by a spare R&B-tinged, melodic piano-based instrumental. Multiple publications such as Billboard and the Chicago Tribune compared its production sound to Kanye West's "Family Business" from West's debut album The College Dropout. XXL referred to the song as a "sticky sweet ballad."

== Critical reception ==
Chris Payne of Billboard praised the song's crossover appeal. John Sakamoto of The Toronto Star said, the "song's affection is old-school hip-hop, which means this smooth, frictionless ballad is 4 1/2 minutes of pure nostalgia."

== Music video ==
The song's music video was directed by Coodie & Chike and filmed with Ed Sheeran in New York City. Coodie & Chike finished the video in Lupe Fiasco's hometown Chicago. It was premiered on December 9, 2013, on MTV.

== Chart performance ==
=== Weekly charts ===
Chart (2013–2014)	Peak position
Australia (ARIA)	23
Canada Hot 100 (Billboard)	100
New Zealand (Recorded Music NZ)	17
US Billboard Hot 100	93
US Pop Airplay (Billboard)	34
US Hot R&B/Hip-Hop Songs (Billboard)	28
US Rhythmic Airplay (Billboard)	7

=== Year-end charts ===
Chart (2014)	position
US Rhythmic (Billboard)	45

== Certifications ==
Region	Certification	Certified units/sales
Australia (ARIA)	Platinum	70,000^{^}
New Zealand (RMNZ)	Gold	7,500^{*}
United States (RIAA)	Gold	500,000^{‡}
^{*} Sales figures based on certification alone.^{^} Shipments figures based on certification alone.^{‡} Sales+streaming figures based on certification alone.

== Release history ==
Country	Date	Format	Label
United States	October 14, 2013	Digital download	1st & 15th Entertainment; Atlantic Records
United States	October 15, 2013	Mainstream urban radio	1st & 15th Entertainment; Atlantic Records
United States	October 15, 2013	Urban contemporary radio	1st & 15th Entertainment; Atlantic Records
United States	November 19, 2013	Contemporary hit radio	1st & 15th Entertainment; Atlantic Records
