= Jeen-Yuhs =

2022 documentary by Coodie & Chike

Jeen-Yuhs: A Kanye Trilogy
- Official release poster
- Directed by: Coodie Simmons; Chike Ozah
- Written by: J. Ivy; Coodie Simmons
- Produced by: Coodie Simmons; Chike Ozah; Leah Natasha Thomas; Marjorie Clarke
- Starring: Kanye West
- Narrated by: Coodie Simmons
- Cinematography: Coodie Simmons; Danny "DNA" Sorge
- Edited by: Max Allman; J.M. Harper
- Music by: Live Footage; CTZN Chance
- Production companies: Creative Control; Leah Natasha Productions; Time Studios
- Distributed by: Netflix
- Release dates: January 23, 2022 (Sundance); February 16, 2022 (Netflix)
- Running time: 89 minutes (Vision); 93 minutes (Purpose); 97 minutes (Awakening)
- Country: United States
- Language: English

Jeen-Yuhs: A Kanye Trilogy (or jeen-yuhs) is a 2022 American documentary film directed by Coodie & Chike about the life of American rapper, record producer, and fashion designer Kanye West and, to a lesser extent, Coodie Simmons.

== Accolades ==
It received a nomination for Best Music Documentary at the 2022 MTV Movie & TV Awards and Outstanding Documentary or Nonfiction Series at the 74th Primetime Emmy Awards.

== Production ==
On May 6, 2021, it was announced that Netflix had acquired a documentary about Kanye West with unreleased archival footage from the prior two decades, including his career in music and fashion, the death of his mother, Donda West, and his unsuccessful 2020 presidential campaign.

Variety reported Netflix acquired the documentary for around US$30 million. On September 25, 2021, Netflix revealed that the documentary would be titled Jeen-Yuhs and released in 2022.

== Episodes ==
No.	Title	Directed by	Written by	Original release date
1	"Act I: Vision"	Coodie Simmons & Chike Ozah	J. Ivy	February 16, 2022
After dazzling hip-hop players in Chicago, brilliant yet hungry producer Kanye West moves to NYC but struggles to get signed and claim the mic as an MC.
2	"Act II: Purpose"	Coodie Simmons & Chike Ozah	J. Ivy	February 23, 2022
Kanye hustles to establish his voice at the label. When a car crash and broken jaw threaten it all, the unstoppable artist turns pain into platinum.
3	"Act: III: Awakening"	Coodie Simmons & Chike Ozah	J. Ivy	March 2, 2022
After multiple "College Dropout" Grammy wins, the documentary looks complete. But life, death and fame get in the way till two paths cross once more.

== Release ==
Divided into three acts, its first episode, "Vision", premiered at the 2022 Sundance Film Festival on January 23, 2022. It also had a limited theatrical release for one night only on February 10, 2022, the eighteenth anniversary of West's debut album The College Dropout (2004). "Vision" premiered on Netflix on February 16, 2022, and the following episodes, "Purpose" and "Awakening", released in weekly intervals, on February 23 and March 2, 2022, respectively.

== Critical reception ==
Jeen-Yuhs was met with positive reception from critics. It holds a positive 82% critic score on Rotten Tomatoes based on 60 critics, and a "generally favorable" weighted mean score of 71 on Metacritic based on 24 critic reviews. The attention from the documentary caused The College Dropout to re-chart on the Billboard 200, reaching as far up as #11.
