= Simeon Career Academy =

Location
- 8147 S. Vincennes Avenue; Chicago, Illinois 60620; United States; 41.7457°N 87.6348°W

Information
- School type: Public, secondary, vocational
- Established: 1949
- School district: Chicago Public Schools
- CEEB code: 141380
- Principal: Trista L. Harper
- Teaching staff: 82.00 (FTE)
- Grades: 9–12
- Gender: Coed
- Enrollment: 1,138 (2023–2024)
- Student to teacher ratio: 13.88
- Campus type: Urban
- Colors: Blue; Gold
- Athletics conference: Chicago Public League
- Team name: Wolverines
- Accreditation: North Central Association of Colleges and Schools
- Yearbook: Simeon
- Website: simeonca.org

Neal F. Simeon Career Academy (formerly known as Westcott Vocational High School, Neal F. Simeon Vocational High School, Neal F. Simeon Career Technical Academy), locally known simply as Simeon, is a public four-year vocational high school located in the Chatham area on the South Side of Chicago, Illinois, United States. Simeon is a part of the Chicago Public Schools district. Opened in 1949, the school is named for African-American Chicago Public Schools educator and administrator Neal Ferdinand Simeon.

== History ==
Simeon was founded in 1949, as Westcott Vocational High School in a building located at 8023 S. Normal Avenue. It operated until the Kroger company donated a vacant warehouse, located at 8235 S. Vincennes Avenue, to the Chicago Public Schools in 1963. The school was renamed Neal F. Simeon Vocational High School in September 1964. The school's name changed from "Vocational High School" to "Career Technical Academy" in September 1998.

With a new gymnasium completed in 1987, Simeon still operated in the Kroger building's limited conditions until a new building was completed and opened in September 2003. When the new building opened, the school's address changed to 8147 S. Vincennes Avenue. In 2003, Simeon's name changed to its current name.

== Career and technical education ==
The Career Academy designation at the Chicago Public Schools is "a college-preparatory curriculum and career–focused education in different fields at each school." Key Career and Technical Education (CTE) programs at Simeon are:

- Accounting
- Architecture
- Auto Tech
- Auto Body
- Barbering
- Carpentry
- Cosmetology
- CISCO (computer) Networking
- Culinary Arts
- Electricity
- Teaching
- Web Design
- Welding

Each program allows students to gain direct knowledge, and most earn industry-recognized certifications or college credit.

Ratings for Simeon reported by the CPS:

- Performance rating: level 1
- SAT average: 889
- Graduation rate: 85.2%
- College enrollment: 61.7%
- Boundary grades served: no boundary
- Grades served: 9–12

== Athletics ==
Simeon competes in the Chicago Public League (CPL) and is a member of the Illinois High School Association (IHSA). Simeon is known in the Chicago area as a high school sports powerhouse. The school sport teams are nicknamed the Wolverines. Simeon is the first Chicago public school to win four consecutive basketball state titles, and the second statewide. "I think what our team has shown is there's excellence in the hood. You can be smart, you can be cool, you can be an athlete," said Sheldon D. House, Simeon principal. The girls' volleyball team were Class AA and public league champions in 1985–86, 1997–98, and 1998–99. Simeon boys won the 2002 Chicago Public Schools wrestling championship.

=== Baseball ===
The boys' baseball team were Class AA and public league champions seven times, in 1982–83, 1984–85, 1989–90, 1997–98, 1998–99, 2002–03, and 2003–04. Simeon also has eight second place seasons. Led by the only African-American member of the Illinois High School Baseball Coaches Association Hall of Fame, "trendsetter" Leroy Franklin, baseball was the first city championship in any sport for the Wolverines. More Simeon alumna have been selected in the Major League Baseball amateur draft than any other high school in the state. After 35 years of coaching Simeon baseball, Franklin retired in 2016.

=== Football ===
The late Alvin Scott was the second winningest high school football coach in the Chicago Public League. He coached Simeon from 1972 to 2004. During that time, the Wolverines had 262 wins against 130 losses. The Wolverines "blue machine" were Chicago Public League champs in 1983, 1986, 2000, 2003 and 2009. Simeon has represented Chicago Public League football in the Chicago Prep Bowl in 1983, 1986, 2000, 2003, 2009, 2011, and 2012, while winning the Bowl in 2013, 2016, and 2017.

=== Basketball ===
The Simeon girls' basketball team were Class AA and regional champions four times, in 2003–04, 2004–05, 2005–06, and 2006–07. Simeon won the IHSA Class AA state boys' basketball championships three times, in 1983–84, 2005–06 (with Derrick Rose), and 2006–07 (with Derrick Rose). They also won the Class 4A championship four times, in 2009–10, 2010–11, 2011–12, and 2012–13 (which tied Manual High School for the longest Illinois state championship title run). Simeon's boys' basketball team was ranked first in the United States in ESPN's 2011 high school preseason rankings. Led by Jabari Parker and Kendrick Nunn, they won the 2012 Illinois Class 4A championship by defeating Proviso East High School.

In 2013, Parker led them to another state championship when they defeated Stevenson High School. Bob Hambric (1939–2009) coached boys’ basketball at Simeon for 24 years. Never having a losing season, in 1984 Hambric coached the team to its first city and state championships.

Simeon boys were the 2016–2017 Chicago Public League Basketball champs. The 68–64 win over far South Side rival Morgan Park High School was their eighth city championship. Simeon was victorious for the third straight time as Chicago public league boys’ basketball champs, with its 69–59 win over Orr Academy (2016–2017 State Class 2A champs) in the 2018 city title game. The last boys’ basketball CPL three-peat was in 1961.

==== Ben Wilson ====
The school is known for 17-year-old Benjamin "Benji" Wilson, then recognized as the top high school basketball player in the nation, who led the Wolverines to their first city and state basketball championships. He was shot on the eve of his senior season opener, November 20, 1984. He died the following day. The day after his murder, Chicago's Mayor Harold Washington spoke to grieving students, denouncing gun violence in the city and promising a new gymnasium for the school, to be named in Wilson's honor. The gymnasium was completed in August 1987.

Afterwards, Wilson's number 25 jersey was traditionally worn by Simeon's best player, until it was retired. The last to wear it was Derrick Rose. Rose moved on to become one of the nation's top point guards in 2007 and eventually an NBA All-Star and league MVP for the Chicago Bulls. Nick Anderson, Deon Thomas and Calvin Brock are Simeon alumni who wore that number at the University of Illinois in honor of Wilson. In 2012, the Simeon team began wearing sneakers on the court with Wilson's name and number 25 on them. A 30 for 30 documentary film about Wilson was released in 2012 by ESPN.

== Notable alumni ==
- Nick Anderson – 1986, former NBA player, notably with the Orlando Magic, No. 11 selection of the 1989 NBA draft; played for the 1989 Illinois Fighting Illini Final Four team
- Calvin Brock – 2004, Chicago Tribune All-State Team, 2009 Illinois Fighting Illini men's basketball sixth man, and professional basketball player in Europe
- Wes Chamberlain – 1984, Major League Baseball outfielder 1990–95
- Mary E. Flowers – 1970, Illinois state representative
- GLC – 1996, rapper (G.O.O.D. Music)
- George Gumbs Jr. – 2021, college football defensive end for the Florida Gators
- Talen Horton-Tucker – 2018, NBA player for the Chicago Bulls
- Jeff Jackson – 1989, former minor league star baseball player, Philadelphia Phillies 1st-round draft pick, first Illinois player to ever win "Gatorade National Player of the Year"
- Bill Johnson – 1987, football player for Michigan State and in the NFL 1992–1999
- Lazeric Jones – 2008, former professional basketball player
- Johnny Mitchell – 1989, football player for Nebraska and in NFL 1992–2003
- Zach Moore – 2009, football player for Concordia and in the NFL 2014–2018
- Aneesah Morrow – 2021, professional basketball player for the Toronto Tempo of the WNBA
- Zach Norvell Jr. – 2016, basketball player, formerly with the Gonzaga Bulldogs; was named West Coast Conference Newcomer of the Year; began his NBA rookie season in 2019 with the Los Angeles Lakers
- Kendrick Nunn – 2013, basketball player, formerly with Illinois Fighting Illini; was first freshman, with Parker, to start at Simeon, for each of four consecutive Illinois State Championship basketball teams; began his NBA rookie season in 2019 with the Miami Heat
- Nate Palmer – 2008, football player for Illinois State and in the NFL 2013–2018
- Jabari Parker – 2013, NBA player for the Boston Celtics, No. 2 selection of the 2014 NBA draft, high school basketball All American; was first freshman, with Nunn, to start at Simeon for each of four consecutive Illinois State Championship basketball teams
- Prolyfic – 1999, music producer (So So Def)
- Corey Ray – 2013, University of Louisville baseball, then first-round pick in the 2016 MLB Draft by the Milwaukee Brewers
- Antonio Reeves – 2019, NBA player for the Charlotte Hornets
- Derrick Rose – 2007, No. 1 selection of the 2008 NBA draft, 2009 NBA Rookie of the Year, 2011 NBA MVP
- Bobby Simmons – 1998, basketball player for DePaul and in the NBA 2001–12 (San Antonio Spurs, Los Angeles Clippers)
- Chau Smith-Wade – 2020, college football cornerback for the Washington State Cougars
- Jaylon Tate – 2013, pro basketball player, formerly with Illinois Fighting Illini
- Deon Thomas – 1989, American-Israeli former basketball player for University of Illinois, then the Dallas Mavericks and Maccabi Tel Aviv B.C.
- Ben Wilson – high school basketball All American who was fatally shot near school, on the eve of his senior season in November 1984
- Martez Wilson – 2007, football player, linebacker for Illinois Fighting Illini, drafted by the New Orleans Saints in 2011
