= Jeff Jackson (baseball) =

American baseball player

- Outfielder
- Born: January 2, 1972 (age 54); Chicago, Illinois, U.S.
- Bats: Right Throws: Right
- Stats at Baseball Reference

Jeffrey Jackson (born January 2, 1972) is an American former professional baseball player who won the Gatorade High School Baseball Player of the Year Award in 1989. He later played in minor league baseball for nine seasons.

== Draft and professional career ==
Jackson was drafted by the Philadelphia Phillies in the first round (fourth overall) of the 1989 Major League Baseball draft out of Simeon Career Academy. He began his professional career that season, hitting .227 in 48 games for the Martinsville Phillies.

Just after his high school graduation, the 17-year-old relocated from Chicago to live with a couple in Martinsville, Virginia, and described feeling culture shock and isolation, spending his days alone in the house, without a driver's license, before heading to the baseball stadium in the afternoons. Jackson was hitting over .500 in his senior year of high school, in contrast to his underperformance in his first year as a professional baseball player, which could account for some of the negative press he received, with one journalist even suggesting the nickname "Clueless Jeff Jackson." Still, the Phillies seemed hopeful that the young player would improve.

In 1990, he hit .198 in 63 games with the Batavia Clippers, and in 1991 he hit .225 in 121 games with the Spartanburg Phillies.

He split 1992 between the Clearwater Phillies (79 games) and Reading Phillies (36 games), hitting a combined .227 in 115 games. He spent all of 1993 and 1994 with Reading, hitting .238 in 113 games in 1993 and .177 in 47 games in 1994.

This was the year that the Phillies finally gave up on Jackson. Reporter Ron Kohl suggested that the organization's years-long commitment to Jackson may have been related to his large signing bonus, which was reportedly $180,000.

He did not play in 1995. In 1996, Jackson returned to organized baseball, playing for the Will County Cheetahs of the independent Heartland League and for the Daytona Cubs in the Chicago Cubs organization. He hit .300 in 26 games overall. In 1997, he played for the Cheetahs again, hitting .303 with 13 home runs in 64 games.

In 1998, Jackson spent 26 games with the Lynchburg Hillcats in the Pittsburgh Pirates system, as well as 15 games with the Fargo-Moorhead RedHawks of the independent Northern League and 26 games with the Massachusetts Mad Dogs of the independent Northeast League. He hit a combined .227 in 69 games. 1998 was his final season.

Overall, Jackson hit .234 in 666 minor league games.

== Post-baseball career ==
After the end of his baseball career, Jackson moved to California, where he started a consulting business. He also had a business called First Round Sports and Entertainment Agency. He published a book with co-author Dana Jones, The Gift and the Curse: The Jeff Jackson Story.
