= Jabari Parker =

American basketball player (born 1995)

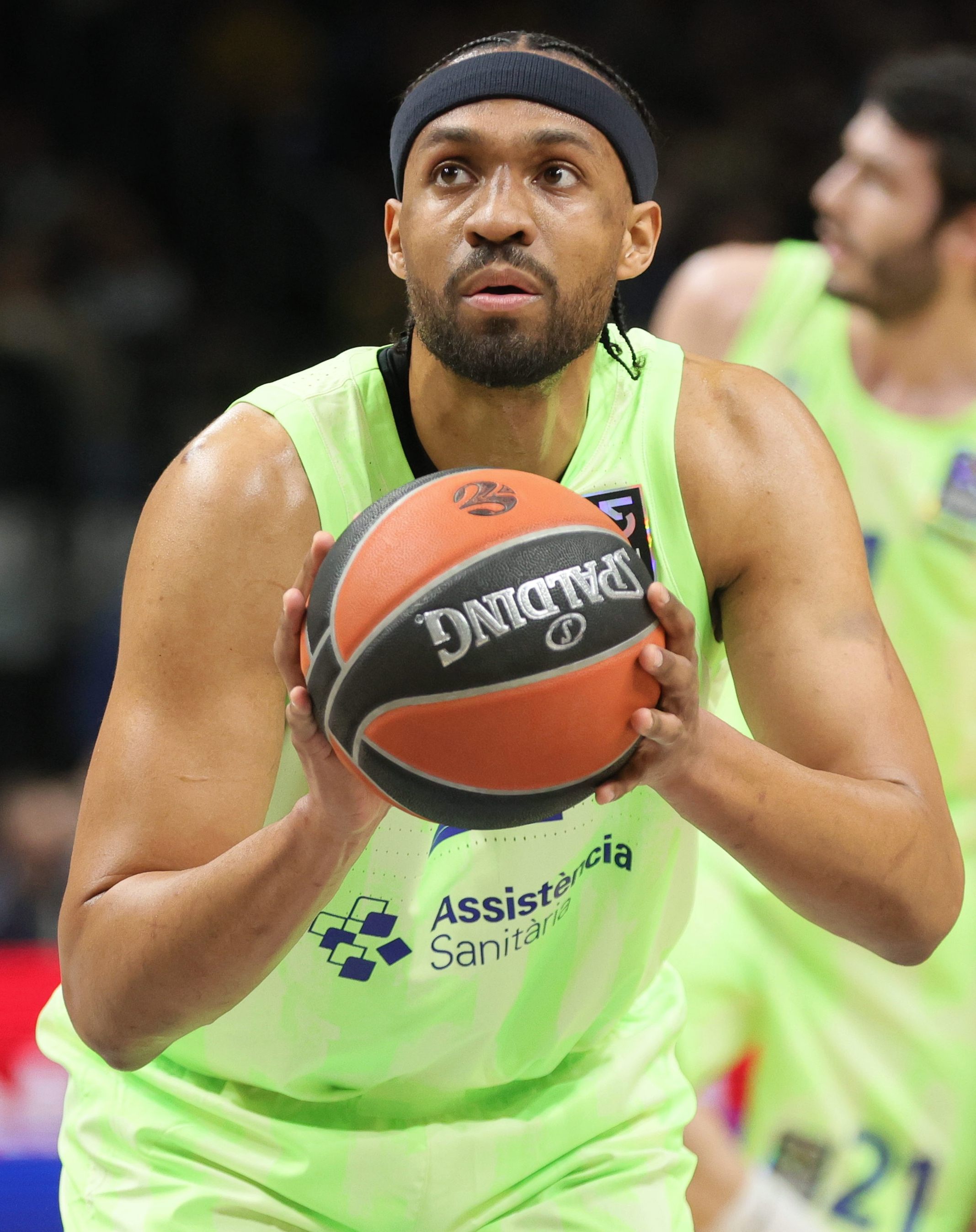
- Parker with FC Barcelona in 2025

Free agent
- Position: Power forward

Personal information
- Born: March 15, 1995 (age 31) Chicago, Illinois, U.S.
- Listed height: 6 ft 8 in (2.03 m)
- Listed weight: 245 lb (111 kg)

Career information
- High school: Simeon (Chicago, Illinois)
- College: Duke (2013–2014)
- NBA draft: 2014: 1st round, 2nd overall pick
- Drafted by: Milwaukee Bucks
- Playing career: 2014–present

Career history
- 2014–2018: Milwaukee Bucks
- 2018–2019: Chicago Bulls
- 2019: Washington Wizards
- 2019–2020: Atlanta Hawks
- 2020–2021: Sacramento Kings
- 2021–2022: Boston Celtics
- 2023–2025: FC Barcelona
- 2025–2026: Partizan
- 2026: →Joventut Badalona

Career highlights
- All-Liga ACB Second Team (2025); Consensus first-team All-American (2014); USBWA National Freshman of the Year (2014); First-team All-ACC (2014); ACC Rookie of the Year (2014); ACC All-Freshman team (2014); USA Today High School Player of the Year (2013); Morgan Wootten National Player of the Year (2013); MaxPreps National Basketball Player of the Year (2013); McDonald's All-American (2013); First-team Parade All-American (2013); 2× Illinois Mr. Basketball (2012, 2013); Gatorade National Player of the Year (2012); USA Basketball Male Athlete of the Year (2011); FIBA Under-16 Americas Championship MVP (2011)
- Stats at NBA.com
- Stats at Basketball Reference
Medals
Men's basketball
Representing the United States
FIBA Under-17 World Championship
Gold medal – first place	2012 Lithuania	National team
FIBA Americas Under-16 Championship
Gold medal – first place	2011 Mexico	National team

Jabari Ali Parker (born March 15, 1995) is an American professional basketball player who last played for Joventut Badalona of the Liga ACB and the Basketball Champions League (BCL), on loan from Partizan. He was selected by the Milwaukee Bucks with the second overall pick in the 2014 NBA draft, after one season of playing for Duke University. He played four seasons for the Bucks before spending time with 5 different teams over the course of four more NBA seasons.

Parker was a standout high school athlete, helping his team win four straight Illinois state championships for Simeon Career Academy, and was named the National High School Player of the Year by Gatorade and McDonald's. In his freshman year for the 2013–14 Duke Blue Devils, he was named a consensus first-team All-American, the USBWA National Freshman of the Year, and the runner-up for the John R. Wooden Award (College Player of the Year).

Among the most accomplished high school basketball players in American history, Parker has been often referred to as a bust due to his lack of success in the NBA, which is in large part due to the numerous injuries he sustained throughout his time in the league. In the summer of 2023 and following a year away from professional basketball, he signed for FC Barcelona and quickly became an important part of their rotation and championship aspirations. His successful transition from the NBA marked a rebirth in his career.

== Early life ==
Parker was born and raised in Chicago's South Shore community area. Parker's father, Sonny, has served hundreds of Chicago metropolitan area children as youth foundation director since 1990. Parker discovered basketball in one of his father's many leagues, although his father has never coached one of his teams. He honed his basketball skills with his brother Christian on the basketball court at his local meetinghouse of the Church of Jesus Christ of Latter-day Saints (LDS Church) in the Hyde Park community area in order to avoid the hazards of urban playgrounds.

Parker was successfully playing with older boys by the age of 7. Most frequently, he played with his older cousin, Jay Parker, who he has credited for pushing him to improve since both boys were in grade school. Jabari competed in middle school leagues as a fifth grader. He made the eighth-grade team as a fourth-grader, but could not play until fifth grade due to the school district's insurance policy.

By the time he was in fifth grade, Parker was a 6-foot (1.83 m) guard with five Division I scholarship offers. In sixth grade, when he stood at 6 feet 2 inches (1.88 m), he visited Simeon for a day and scrimmaged with Derrick Rose. Parker attended Robert A. Black Magnet Elementary and made headlines when he made Simeon Career Academy his high school choice, just like Rose, Nick Anderson, Ben Wilson, Bobby Simmons and Deon Thomas before him. Though Parker has two older sisters who also attended Simeon, his choice was based on a goal of achieving the most championships. Parker told the Chicago Tribune, "That's the reason I picked Simeon, because I knew it was going to be possible to reach four state championships." During the summer after finishing middle school, he received a National Basketball Players Association Top 100 Camp invitation, which he accepted. By this time, he stood at 6 feet 4 inches (1.93 m).

== High school career ==
=== Freshman year ===
Parker was the first freshman to start on the Simeon varsity team in school history. Over the course of the season, he contributed 19.3 points per game, 5.0 rebounds per game, and 3.0 assists per game, while his team won the IHSA Class 4A state championship with a 25–9 record. By the end of the season, he had received numerous scholarship offers, including those from Illinois, Kansas, DePaul, Pittsburgh, Northwestern, Florida, Washington, BYU and Oregon State as well as significant interest from Kentucky, Duke and North Carolina. He earned the ESPN HS 2010 Freshman of the Year. He was a MaxPreps.com second team 2009-10 Boys Basketball Freshman All-American Team selection.

=== Sophomore year ===
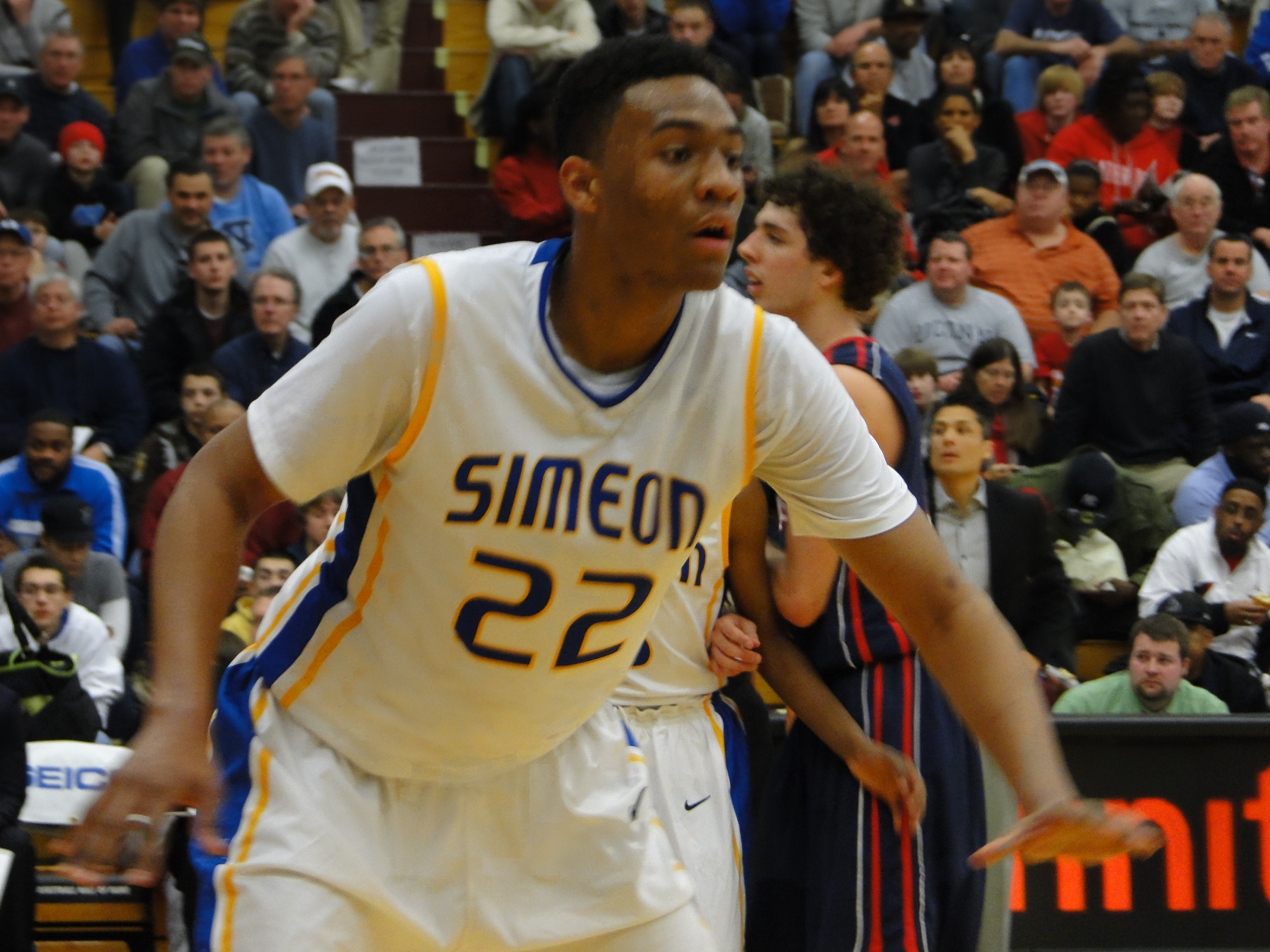
Parker in January 2011

As a sophomore, Parker helped his team spend much of the season ranked nationally in the top five. That season, he averaged 15.3 points and 5.9 rebounds per game, while his team won the IHSA Class 4A state championship with a 30–2 record. He earned second team All-State recognition from the Chicago Tribune, while the Chicago Sun-Times listed him as a Class 4A All-State first-team selection with Ryan Boatright, Tracy Abrams, David Sobolewski and Frank Kaminsky. The 12-man Illinois Basketball Coaches Association Class 3A/4A boys' all-state first team included these five and Wayne Blackshear, Johnny Hill, Mike Shaw, Nnanna Egwu, Sam Thompson, Anthony Davis and Mycheal Henry. He earned the ESPN HS 2011 Sophomore of the year. He was a MaxPreps.com first team 2010-11 Boys Basketball Sophomore All-American Team selection.

=== Junior year ===
During his junior year preseason, Parker participated in the July 2011 LeBron James Skill Academy, and he was one of a handful of juniors invited to the August 5–7, 2011 5th annual Nike Global Challenge, where he earned tournament MVP honors.

During the season, Parker established the Simeon single-game scoring record with 40 points in 21 minutes of play to go along with 16 rebounds and 6 blocked shots against Perspectives High School. As a junior in high school, he received offers from Duke, Kansas, BYU, Kentucky, UNC, and others. On February 17, Parker and Simeon won the Public League championship by defeating Curie Metropolitan High School 53–49. Both the semifinals and finals were broadcast on ESPN3. Coaches Izzo, Krzyzewski, Matta, and Weber as well as Mayor Emanuel and cadres of their assistants were among those in attendance to see this March 6 IHSA sectional semifinal against Young won by Simeon 52–42 in which Parker led the way with 18 points and 6 rebounds. In the days prior to the state final four, Parker stated that although Coach Weber had been fired, he remained interested in Illinois and other in-state schools such as DePaul and Northwestern. Parker had 15 points in the March 17 championship game 50–48 victory over the Sterling Brown-led Proviso East High School, resulting in a 33–1 junior year record for Simeon. The state semifinals and the finals were broadcast live on ESPN3. For the season, Parker averaged 19.5 points, 8.9 rebounds, 4.9 assists, 3.3 blocks and 1.4 steals per game or 20.4 points, 9.2 rebounds, 5.1 assists, 3.4 blocks and 1.5 steals per game, depending on the source, while shooting 55 percent from the field, 39 percent from 3-point range and 72 percent from the free-throw line. Following the season, he was featured in a May cover story in Sports Illustrated with the title "The Best High School Basketball Player since LeBron James Is . . . Jabari Parker but There's Something More Important to Him than Instant NBA Stardom: His Faith". The story presented his humility and noted that he is conflicted on his decision to serve as an LDS Church missionary. Parker announced that he anticipated trimming his potential schools to a list of five by the end of the summer so that he could plan official visits.

For his efforts during his junior year, Parker earned several accolades. The Chicago Sun-Times named him to the Class 4A All-State first team along with Jahlil Okafor, Keith Carter, Darius Paul and Fred VanVleet. He was also a first team (unanimous) All-State selection by the Associated Press along with VanVleet, Carter, Taylor, and Malcolm Hill. The Chicago Tribune named him first team All-State along with Carter, Aaron Simpson, Taylor, and VanVleet. He was named the 2012 Illinois boys' basketball Gatorade Player of the Year. He became the first non-senior honoree in the 32-year history of Illinois Mr. Basketball, which is awarded by the Chicago Tribune in conjunction with the Illinois Basketball Coaches Association. On April 12, he was announced as the winner of the national boys' basketball Gatorade Player of the Year, which was presented to him by ex-NBA player Alonzo Mourning, who greeted him at his school in a special assembly. Parker was the fourth junior to win the award (LeBron James, Greg Oden and Brandon Knight). Parker finished second to Shabazz Muhammad in ESPN HS's Mr. Basketball USA voting. They were the only two players to appear on every ballot. However, Parker was selected as the ESPN HS National Junior of the Year and the MaxPreps.com National Junior of the Year. He was selected as a first team ESPN HS boys' high school basketball All-American along with Kyle Anderson, Marcus Smart, Shabazz Muhammad and Nerlens Noel by ESPN HS. He was also a first team All-USA selection by USA Today with the same four players. SLAM Magazine selected him to its first team along with Anderson, Muhammad, Noel and Isaiah Austin.

=== Senior year ===
Parker during his senior year of high school

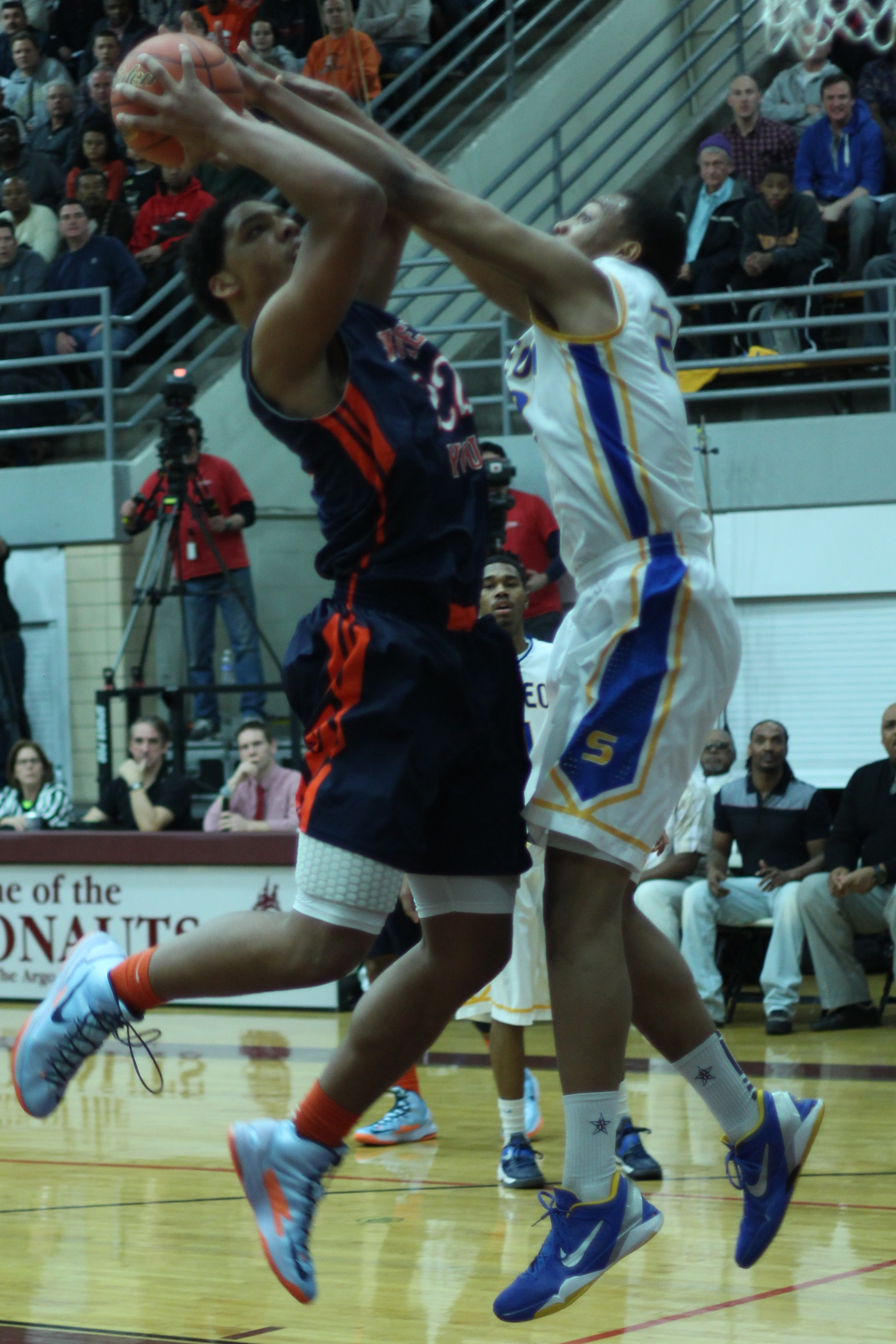
Defending Jahlil Okafor in the IHSA playoffs

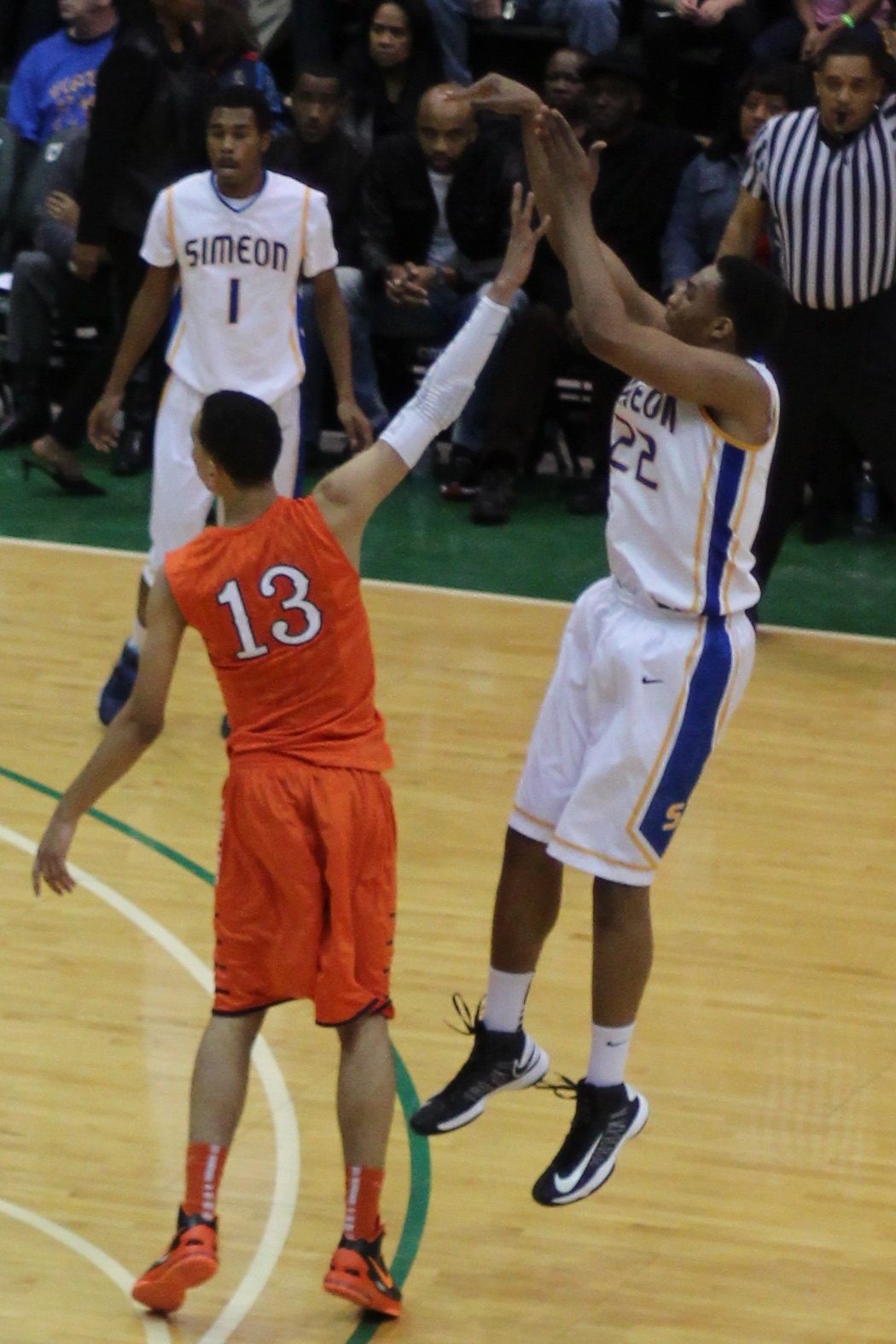
Shooting over a defender

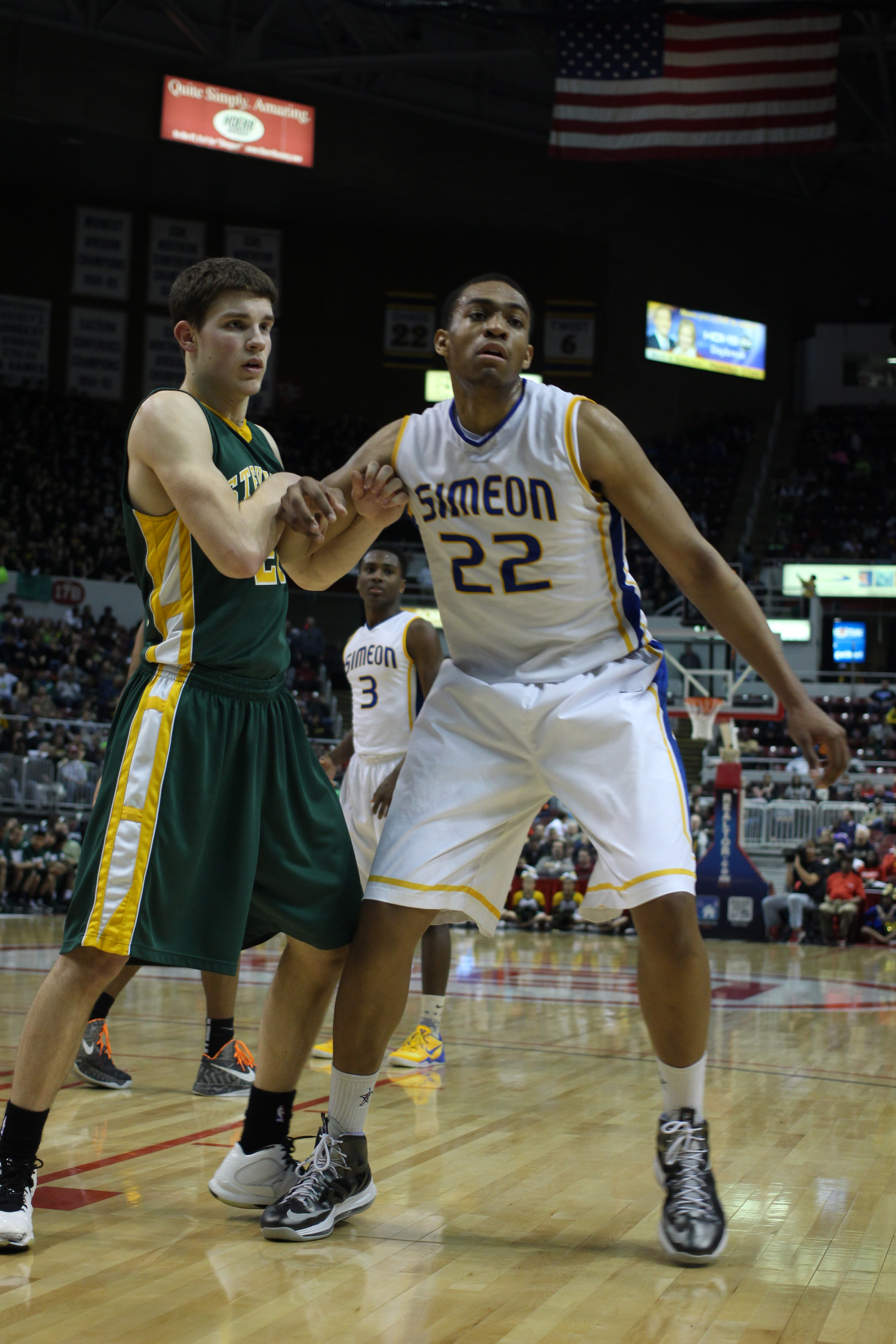
Boxing out a defender in the IHSA championship

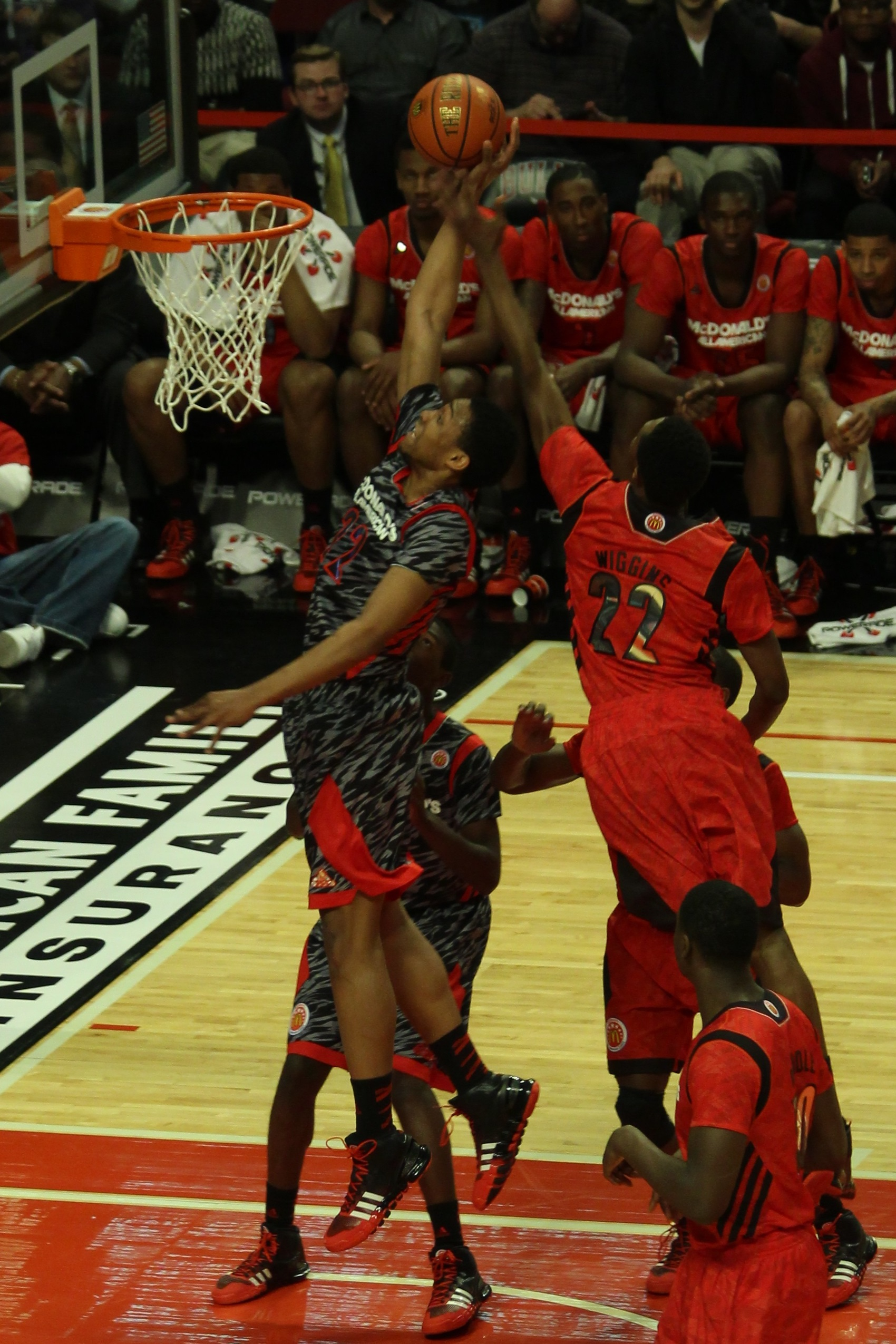
Approaching the rim for a tip-in, 2013 McDonald's AABG

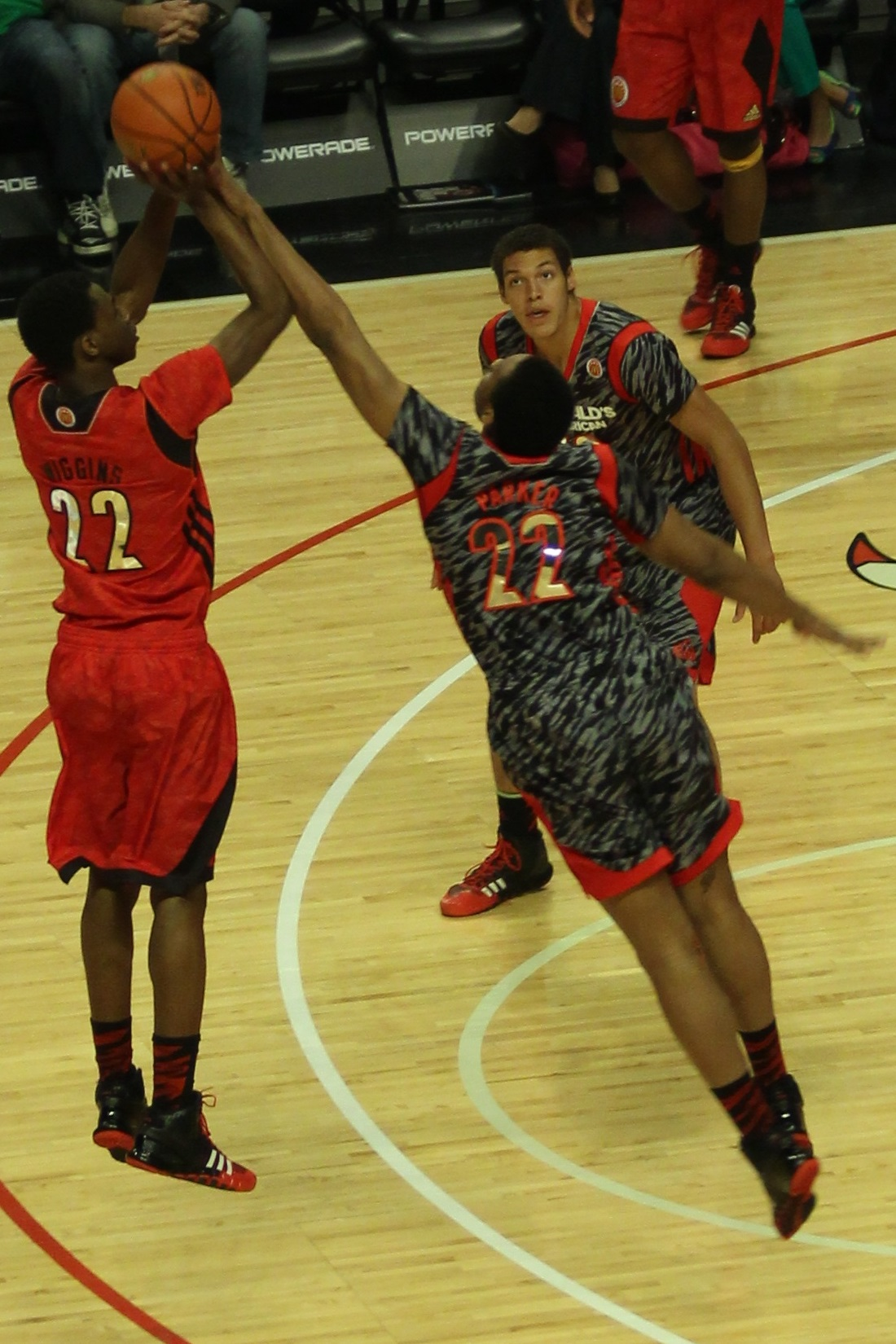
Blocking a jump shot by Andrew Wiggins, 2013 McDonald's AABG

Parker entered the summer of 2012 as the consensus number one player in the country until he was sidelined with a foot injury, which caused him to miss some games during the 2012 FIBA Under-17 World Championship. Parker was one of ten USA Today preseason All-USA selections, and his team was ranked No. 1 preseason nationally by MaxPreps.com. On December 20, 2012, he chose to play for Duke.

Over the course of his senior season, Parker and Simeon played in six showcase games that required travel outside of the region. Three of the showcase games were broadcast nationally on one of the ESPN networks.

Parker led Simeon to its fourth consecutive IHSA class 4A state championship with a 58–40 victory over Stevenson High School, matching Manual High School's IHSA record of four consecutive IHSA basketball championships. In the process, Parker, who scored 20 points and had 8 rebounds, became the second player (Sergio McClain) in IHSA history to start for four consecutive state basketball champions. Simeon finished with a 30–3 record.

Several more accolades followed his senior year performance. USA Basketball selected Parker as a member of the 2013 USA Junior National Select Team for the April 20, 2013 Nike Hoop Summit at the Rose Garden. On February 12, Parker was recognized as a 2013 All-Public League first team selection by the Chicago Sun-Times. That same day, Parker was selected to play in the April 13 Jordan Brand Classic at the Barclays Center. On March 18, Parker earned the Morgan Wootten Male Player of the Year, which recognizes "the McDonald's All-American who demonstrates outstanding character, exhibits leadership and exemplifies the values of being a student-athlete in the classroom and the community". On March 21, Parker was named the Gatorade Illinois Boys Basketball Player of the Year, and on March 25, he repeated as Illinois Mr. Basketball. On April 9, he earned another National Player of the Year recognition, this time by MaxPreps.com. On April 17, he was a first team All-USA selection by USA Today, and on May 18, he was named a 2013 first-team Parade All-American.

During the McDonald's All-Star game played at the United Center in his hometown, Parker scored 10 points on 4-for-13 shooting and added 8 rebounds, 3 assists, 2 steals and 2 blocks, contributing to a 110–99 West victory. At the April 13 Jordan Brand Classic played at the Barclays Center, Parker was co-MVP along with Julius Randle. He had 16 points, 7 rebounds and 2 assists to help lead the West team to a 102–98 victory. At the April 20 Nike Hoop Summit held in Portland, Oregon, Parker had a team-high 22 points and 7 rebounds as the U.S. Junior National Select Team was defeated 112–98 by the World Select team.

Parker concluded his high school career as the fourth rated player in the class of 2013 according to Rivals, behind Wiggins, Randle, and Aaron Gordon.

College recruiting
Name	Hometown	School	Height	Weight	Commit date
Jabari Parker; SF	Chicago	Simeon (Illinois)	6 ft 7 in (2.01 m)	215 lb (98 kg)	Dec 20, 2012
Jabari Parker; SF	Recruit ratings: Scout: Rivals: (96)				
Overall recruit ranking: Scout: 3, 2 (SF) Rivals: 4, 2 (SF) ESPN: 2, 2 (SF)
Note: In many cases, Scout, Rivals, 247Sports, On3, and ESPN may conflict in their listings of height and weight.; In these cases, the average was taken. ESPN grades are on a 100-point scale.; Sources: "2013 Duke Basketball Commitment List". Rivals.; "2013 Duke Basketball Commitment List". Scout.; "2013 Duke Basketball Commitment List". ESPN.; "Scout.com Team Recruiting Rankings". Scout.; "2013 Team Ranking". Rivals.

== College career ==
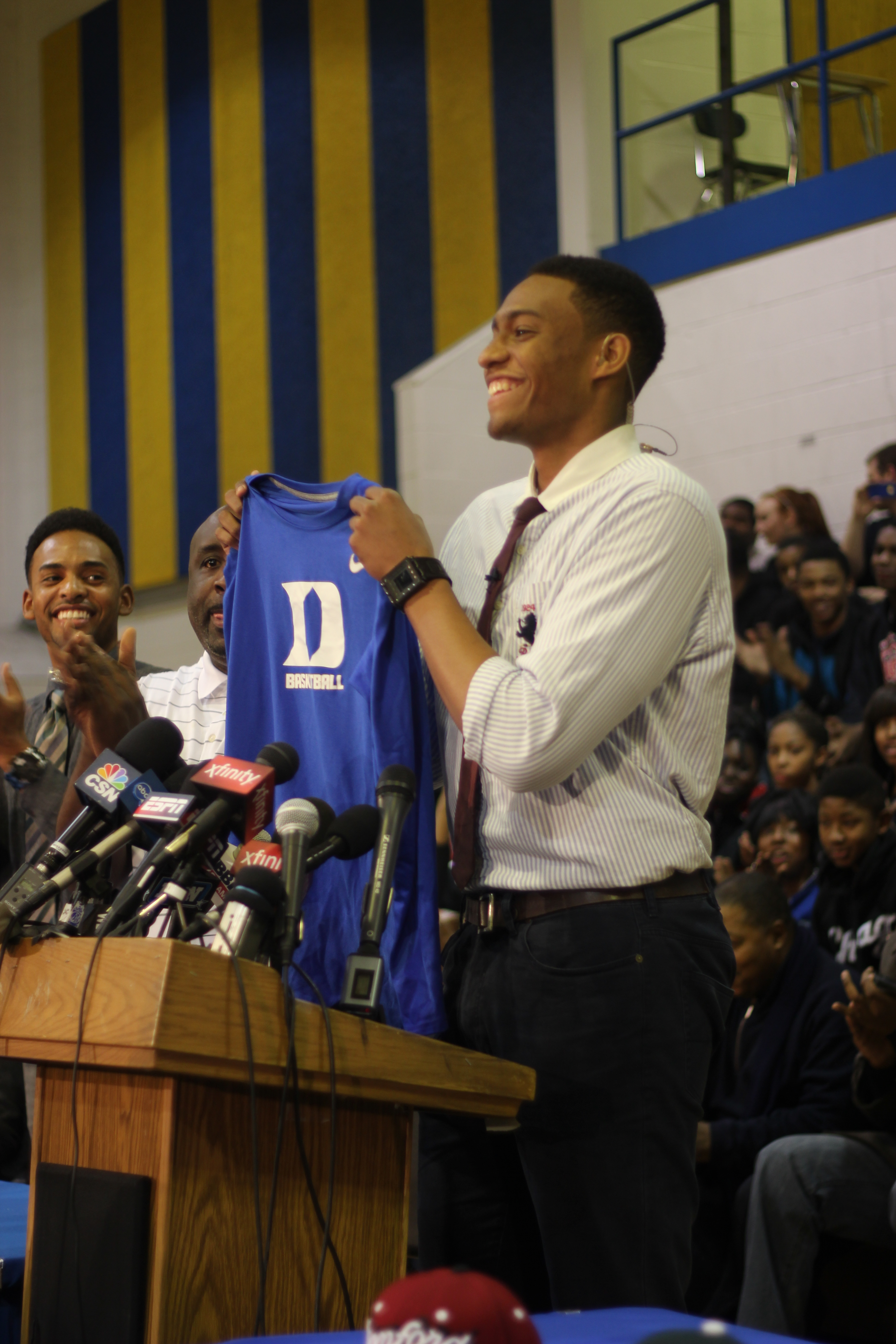
Parker announcing his verbal commitment to play at Duke

During the summer prior to matriculating at Duke, Parker participated in the Nike sponsored Chi-League, a 9-weekend 10-team Chicago summer pro-am league, Preseason honors included preseason All-American first team listings by Sporting News and USA Today, and being named the preseason ACC Rookie of the Year.

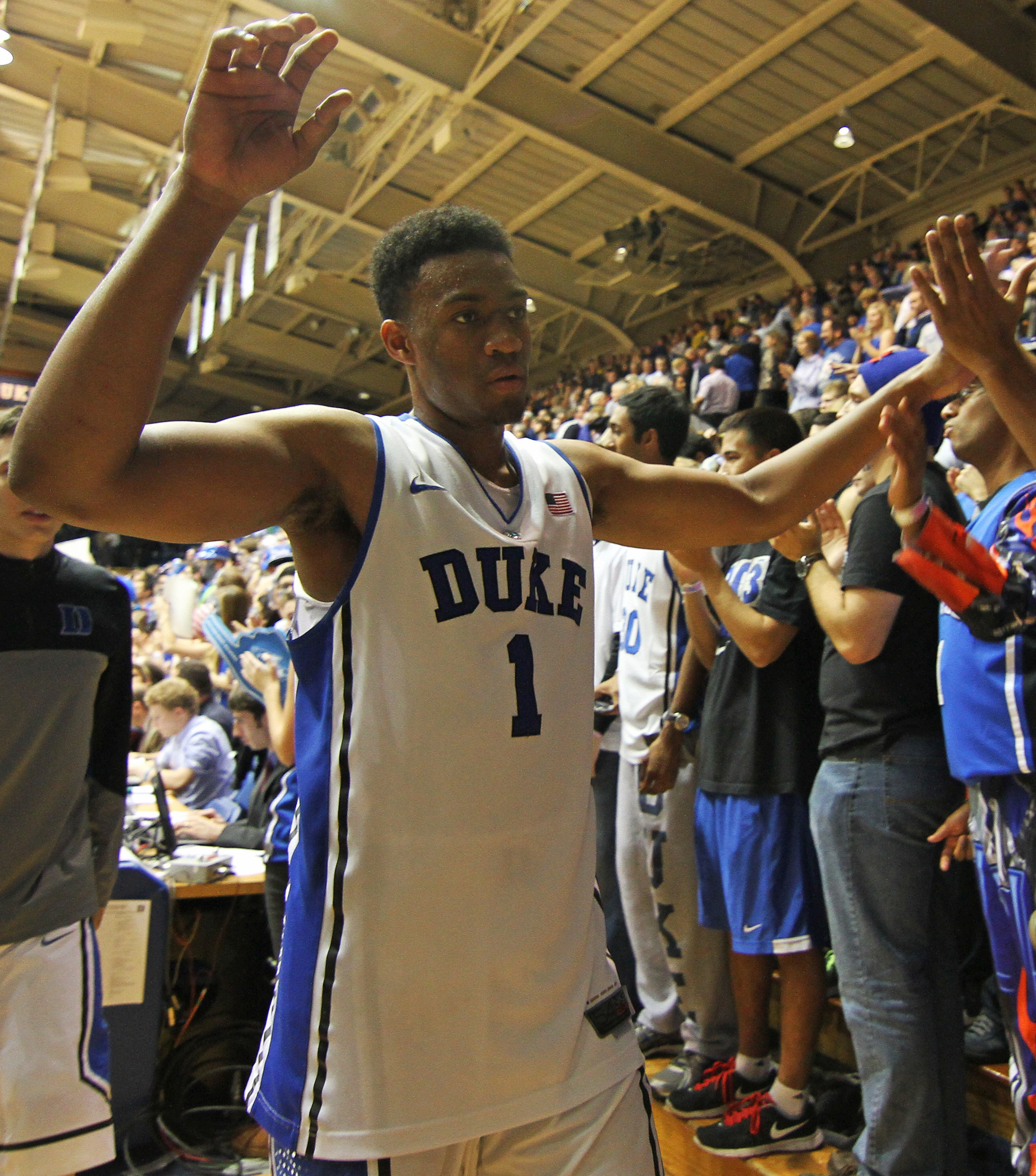
Parker with the 2013–14 Duke Blue Devils

Parker debuted for Duke on November 8 with 22 points, 6 rebounds, 2 assists, and 1 block against Davidson—becoming Krzyzewski's fifth freshman to debut with 20 points and was part of Duke's first game with four 20-point scorers (along with Hood, Cook and Sulaimon) in school history. For his efforts, on November 11 Parker earned his first ACC Rookie of the Week recognition. On November 13, Parker earned his second Sports Illustrated cover as part of a four-version set of regional covers depicting college basketball's greatest rivalries on the College Basketball Preview Issue. On November 12 in the Champions Classic at his hometown United Center, Parker posted 27 points, 9 rebounds, 1 assist, 2 steals, and 1 block in a losing effort against Wiggins's Kansas Jayhawks. On January 18, Parker scored 23 against NC State, tying him with Gene Banks for most 20-point games by a Duke freshman. On January 25, Parker tallied 14 points, 3 steals and 14 rebounds against Florida State to help Mike Krzyzewski win his 900th game at Duke. On March 8, in the second Carolina–Duke rivalry game of the season, Parker had a career high 30 points. On March 10, he earned a record-tying (Kenny Anderson and Tyler Hansbrough) tenth ACC rookie of the week honor in the final week of the regular season.

In postseason play, Parker yielded a 20-point performance in the semifinals of the 2014 ACC men's basketball tournament against NC State on March 15, which marked his 17th such effort and moved him into sole possession of second place on the ACC freshman list, ahead of Marbury. In the March 16 championship game against Virginia, Parker posted his 18th 20-point game, which was one short of Anderson's ACC freshman record. Parker and the team, ranked No. 3 in the Midwest region, ended the season in the first round of the NCAA tournament with a loss to No. 14 Mercer. Parker set the Duke record for freshman scoring average (19.1) and became the first freshman to lead the team in both scoring and rebounding.

Parker received much recognition for his freshman year performance. He was unanimously selected to both the Atlantic Coast Sports Media Association (ACSMA) All-ACC first team and the Coaches All-ACC Freshman Team. He was also selected to the Coaches All-ACC Basketball first team with the most points. Parker was voted the ACC Freshman of the Year receiving 72 of 77 votes and placed second for the ACC Player of the Year award, trailing Warren 48–25. Parker was a 2014 NCAA Men's Basketball All-American first-team selection by The Associated Press, The Sporting News, Sports Illustrated, NBC Sports, Bleacher Report, United States Basketball Writers Association (USBWA), National Association of Basketball Coaches (NABC), and USA Today. Parker was USBWA National Freshman of the Year and named to the 2013 Freshman All-American. He was selected to the first team All-ACC tournament team. Parker also earned John R. Wooden Award All-American Team recognition.

== Professional career ==
=== Milwaukee Bucks (2014–2018) ===
==== 2014–15 season ====
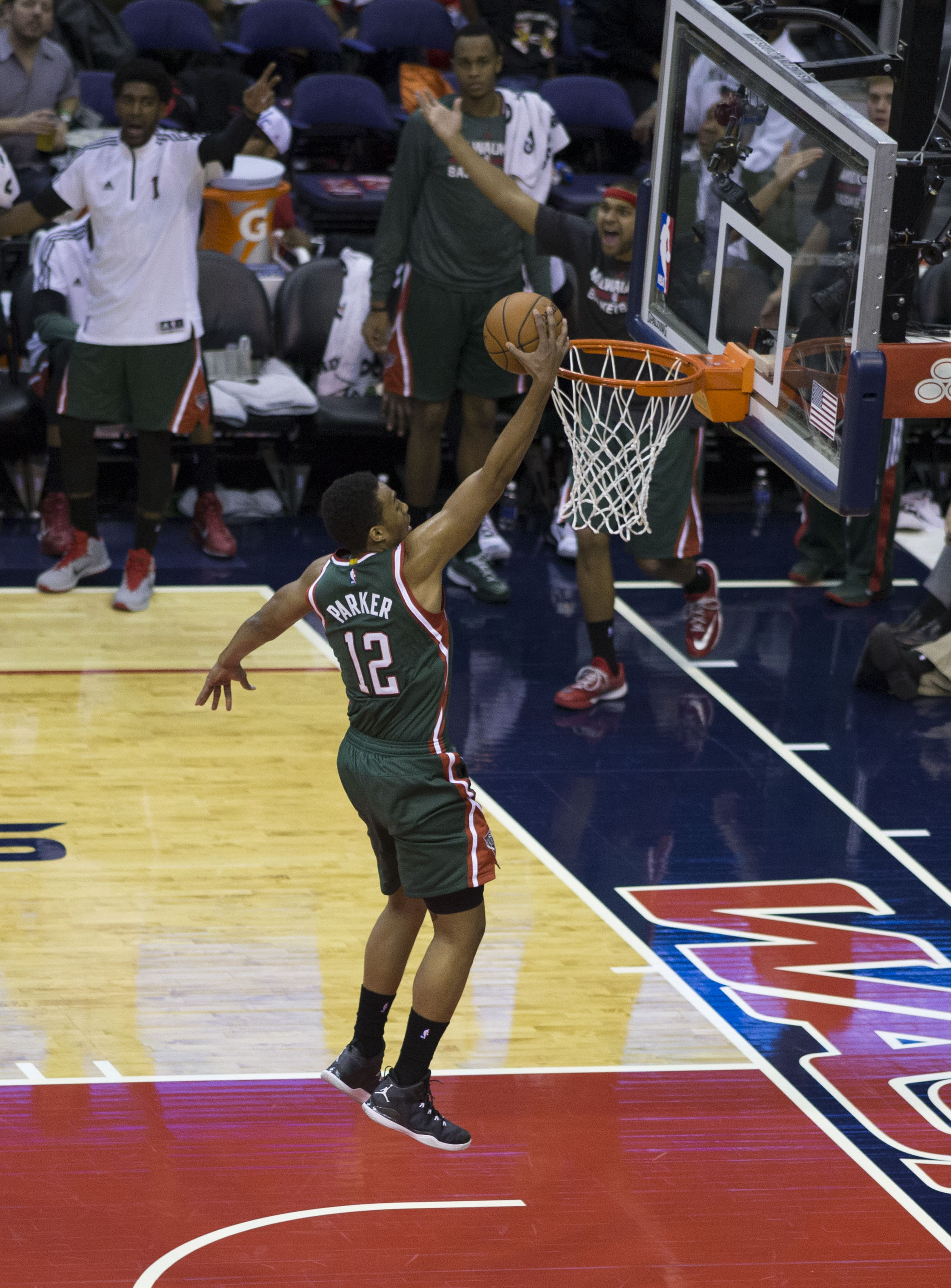
Parker about to score against the Washington Wizards in 2014

On April 17, Parker declared for the 2014 NBA draft in an exclusive autobiographical story in Sports Illustrated. He signed with sports agent Rich Paul, but other sources, such as SLAM Magazine, suggest that he signed with B. J. Armstrong. Parker declined to participate in the NBA Draft Combine. On June 26, Parker was selected no. 2 overall by the Milwaukee Bucks. Just prior to the draft, Parker signed a shoe endorsement deal with the Jordan Brand.

On July 9, 2014, Parker signed with the Bucks and joined them for the 2014 NBA Summer League.

On October 29, 2014, Parker made his NBA debut in the Bucks' season opener against the Charlotte Hornets. In just under 37 minutes of action as a starter, he recorded 8 points, 4 rebounds, 1 assist, and 1 steal in a 108–106 overtime loss. Two nights later in his first home game, he posted a double-double with 11 points and 10 rebounds against the Philadelphia 76ers. On November 19, he posted a season-high 23 points in a triple-overtime win over the Brooklyn Nets. Parker was selected as the October/November Eastern Conference Rookie of the Month. On December 15, Parker suffered a season-ending injury by tearing his left anterior cruciate ligament (ACL) against the Phoenix Suns.

==== 2015–16 season ====
Parker's injury extended into the beginning of the 2015–16 NBA season. He returned to action on November 4 against the Philadelphia 76ers in the fifth game of the season for the Bucks but struggled, posting just two points in 16 minutes as a starter. As he ramped up his activity, he was rested on the second of back-to-back games. Nonetheless, after five games, he endured a sprain in his talonavicular joint in the right mid-foot causing him to be expected to miss several games. He only missed one game. The following week, he began to come off the bench while O. J. Mayo took his starting spot. On December 12, Parker had a 19-point, 7-rebound, 2-steal performance against the Golden State Warriors to help end their 24-game win streak. On January 27, 2016, he was named to the 2016 NBA All-Star Game weekend Rising Stars Challenge lineup. On February 19, he tied his career high with 23 points in a loss to the Charlotte Hornets. He surpassed that total the following night, recording career highs of 28 points and 13 rebounds in a 117–109 double-overtime win over the Atlanta Hawks. On February 29, Parker set a new career high with 36 points in a 128–121 Bucks victory over the Houston Rockets.

==== 2016–17 season ====
On January 15, 2017, Parker was one assist and one field goal shy of his first NBA triple-double against the Atlanta Hawks. On February 9, Parker was ruled out for the rest of the 2016–17 season after an MRI revealed a torn anterior cruciate ligament (ACL) in his left knee. The recovery and rehabilitation period was estimated at 12 months. It was his second ACL tear in the same knee, the first having occurred in December 2014. For the season, he averaged 20.1 points (2nd on team), 6.2 rebounds, 2.8 assists and 1.0 steals in 33.9 minutes over 51 games before the injury.

==== 2017–18 season ====
On December 18, 2017, the Bucks assigned Parker to their NBA G League affiliate, the Wisconsin Herd, so that he could practice while completing his recovery. After two workouts with the Herd, Parker was recalled by the Bucks on December 19.

On February 2, 2018, Parker made his first appearance for the Bucks since February 9, 2017, scoring 12 points in a 92–90 win over the New York Knicks. He made 4 of 7 shots over nearly 15 minutes as a reserve. On February 27, 2018, he scored a season-high 19 points in a 107–104 loss to the Washington Wizards. On March 21, 2018, he scored a season-high 20 points in 30 minutes (the most he'd played since rejoining the team) in a 127–120 loss to the Los Angeles Clippers. On April 1, he posted a season-high 35 points along with 10 rebounds in an overtime loss to the Denver Nuggets. It marked the first time all season that Parker played more than a few seconds over his 30-minute cap since his return to the lineup. Following the 2017–18 NBA season, the Bucks made Parker a qualifying offer, giving them the right to match an offer sheet within 48 hours. The Bucks later retracted the qualifying offer, allowing Parker and the Chicago Bulls to agree to a contract.

=== Chicago Bulls (2018–2019) ===
On July 14, 2018, Parker signed a two-year, $40 million contract with the Chicago Bulls. He debuted with the Bulls on October 18 with 15 points and 5 rebounds off the bench against the Philadelphia 76ers. Four days later, he scored a season-high 20 points off the bench against the Dallas Mavericks. On November 21, Parker posted 20 points and 13 rebounds against the Phoenix Suns, but his eight assists left him two short of his first career triple-double. In early December, soon after Jim Boylen took over the head coaching position from Fred Hoiberg, the Bulls dropped Parker from their rotation, no longer giving him regular minutes. This was also about the time that Bobby Portis returned to the lineup on December 10, after sitting out nearly seven weeks. Parker posted 22 points on January 29 against the Brooklyn Nets.

=== Washington Wizards (2019) ===
On February 6, 2019, Parker was traded, along with Bobby Portis and a 2023 second-round pick, to the Washington Wizards in exchange for Otto Porter. Parker posted career highs with 14 rebounds on February 27 against the Brooklyn Nets. and 15 rebounds on March 27 against the Phoenix Suns. Washington declined the team option on what would have been Parker's 2nd year with the team, which would have yielded Parker $20 million.

=== Atlanta Hawks (2019–2020) ===
On July 11, 2019, Parker signed a two-year, $13 million contract with the Atlanta Hawks. On November 27, he logged a season-high 33 points, alongside 14 rebounds, five assists and two steals, in a 102–111 loss to the Milwaukee Bucks. On January 7, 2020, it was announced that Parker would be out at least two weeks with a shoulder injury.

=== Sacramento Kings (2020–2021) ===
On February 6, 2020, Parker was traded, alongside Alex Len, to the Sacramento Kings in exchange for Dewayne Dedmon, a 2020 second-round pick, and a 2021 second-round pick.

On March 25, 2021, Parker was waived by the Kings.

=== Boston Celtics (2021–2022) ===
On April 16, 2021, Parker signed with the Boston Celtics. In his debut with the Celtics, Parker scored 11 points on 5-6 shooting in 16 minutes. He later played in 4 of their remaining 11 games. In the Celtics' first round series versus the Brooklyn Nets, he averaged 8.5 points on 14.8 minutes per game.

On October 17, 2021, Parker was waived by the Celtics, but three days later, they re-signed him to a renegotiated deal after clearing waivers. On January 7, 2022, Parker was waived by the Celtics again.

On June 30, 2023, Parker joined the Milwaukee Bucks for the 2023 NBA Summer League.

=== FC Barcelona (2023–2025) ===
On August 7, 2023, Parker signed a one-year contract with EuroLeague and Liga ACB powerhouse FC Barcelona. On September 24, 2023, Parker made his debut for Barcelona by scoring a team-high 12 points in a win over Girona. He quickly became a key player for Barcelona, averaging 10.3 points and 3.9 rebounds in 33 games in the EuroLeague. In 28 games in the Liga ACB, he averaged 11.5 points and 3.1 rebounds and helped Barcelona reach the semi-finals of the Liga ACB playoffs where they lost against Real Madrid. In the deciding third game of the series, he scored a season high 27 points. In April 2024, he signed a contract extension through 2026.

In his second season, Parker recorded his best numbers playing for Barcelona on March 16, 2025, in a Liga ACB win on the road against BC Andorra. He scored 34 points, making 6 three-pointers. It was the highest personal score for a FC Barcelona player in a Liga ACB game in 11 years. Parker was named to the All-Liga ACB Second Team for the 2024–25 ACB season.

On June 23, 2025, Parker and Barcelona reached an agreement to terminate the player's contract, which was originally set to run until June 30, 2026. The club released a video of Parker thanking the fans for their support during his spell at Barcelona.

=== Partizan (2025–2026) ===
On June 28, 2025, Parker signed a two-year deal with Partizan of the Basketball League of Serbia (KLS), ABA League, and the EuroLeague. In November 2025, Parker left the team temporarily due to a family tragedy.

After returning to Partizan in the summer of 2026, Parker fell out of head coach Joan Peñarroya's plans and did not appear in any games during the 2026–27 season. On October 23, 2026, he parted ways with the club.

==== Loan to Joventut Badalona (2026) ====
After a disappointing first half of the season and being sidelined from Partizan's roster, Parker was loaned out until the end of the 2025–26 season to Joventut Badalona of the Liga ACB and the Basketball Champions League (BCL). The loan was officially announced on February 26, 2026. In 20 Liga ACB games with Joventut, he averaged 12.6 points, 4.5 rebounds and 1.5 assists per game.

== Career statistics ==
Legend
GP	Games played	GS	Games started	MPG	Minutes per game
FG%	Field-goal percentage	3P%	3-point field-goal percentage	FT%	Free-throw percentage
RPG	Rebounds per game	APG	Assists per game	SPG	Steals per game
BPG	Blocks per game	PPG	Points per game	PIR	Performance index rating
**Bold**	Career high

=== NBA ===
==== Regular season ====
Year	Team	GP	GS	MPG	FG%	3P%	FT%	RPG	APG	SPG	BPG	PPG
2014–15	Milwaukee	25	25	29.5	.490	.250	.697	5.5	1.7	1.2	.2	12.3
2015–16	Milwaukee	**76**	**72**	31.7	.493	.257	.768	5.5	1.7	.9	.4	14.1
2016–17	Milwaukee	51	50	**33.9**	.490	.365	.743	6.2	**2.8**	1.0	.4	**20.1**
2017–18	Milwaukee	31	3	24.0	.482	.383	.741	4.9	1.9	.8	.3	12.6
2018–19	Chicago	39	17	26.7	.474	.325	.731	6.2	2.2	.6	.4	14.3
2018–19	Washington	25	0	27.3	.523	.296	.684	**7.2**	2.7	.9	**.6**	15.0
2019–20	Atlanta	35	23	26.2	.504	.270	.736	6.0	1.8	**1.3**	.5	15.0
2019–20	Sacramento	6	0	13.3	**.583**	.250	.889	3.8	1.7	.5	.2	8.5
2020–21	Sacramento	3	0	9.0	.571	.000	—	2.0	.3	.0	.3	2.7
2020–21	Boston	10	0	13.8	.542	.200	.769	3.6	1.0	.1	.4	6.4
2021–22	Boston	12	0	9.3	.474	**.500**	**1.000**	2.3	.5	.3	.1	4.4
Career		310	190	27.5	.494	.326	.743	5.5	2.0	.9	.4	14.1

==== Playoffs ====
Year	Team	GP	GS	MPG	FG%	3P%	FT%	RPG	APG	SPG	BPG	PPG
2018	Milwaukee	**7**	0	**23.9**	.452	.316	.615	**6.1**	**1.4**	**1.0**	.6	**10.0**
2021	Boston	4	0	14.8	**.619**	**.400**	**.750**	3.8	.5	.0	**.8**	8.5
Career		11	0	20.5	.494	.333	.667	5.3	1.1	.6	.6	9.5

=== EuroLeague ===
Year	Team	GP	GS	MPG	FG%	3P%	FT%	RPG	APG	SPG	BPG	PPG	PIR
2023–24	Barcelona	38	20	24.0	.457	.381	.767	**4.2**	.7	.6	**.4**	10.6	9.6
2024–25	Barcelona	**39**	**38**	**27.1**	**.557**	**.383**	**.794**	4.0	**1.7**	**.8**	.2	**13.8**	**12.4**
2025–26	Partizan	15	10	19.2	.391	.293	.947	2.5	.7	.3	.1	7.7	5.1
Career		92	68	24.5	.459	.372	.800	3.8	1.2	.6	.3	11.5	10.1

=== Domestic leagues ===
Year	Team	League	GP	MPG	FG%	3P%	FT%	RPG	APG	SPG	BPG	PPG
2023–24	(Spain) Barcelona	ACB	38	21.7	.503	.412	.841	3.2	.7	.7	.3	12.4
2024–25	(Spain) Barcelona	ACB	36	24.3	.509	.475	.782	3.8	1.3	.7	.4	12.9

=== College ===
Year	Team	GP	GS	MPG	FG%	3P%	FT%	RPG	APG	SPG	BPG	PPG
2013–14	Duke	35	35	30.7	.473	.358	.748	8.7	1.2	1.1	1.2	19.1
Career		35	35	30.7	.473	.358	.748	8.7	1.2	1.1	1.2	19.1

== National team career ==
In October 2010, Parker was among the 18 players who participated in the 2011–12 USA Developmental National Team mini-camp giving him an automatic invitation to the June 10–18, 2011 tryouts for FIBA U16 competition at the United States Olympic Training Center in Colorado Springs, Colorado. Parker was one of four Chicago products to emerge from the 27-man tryouts as part of the 12-man team. He was MVP of the 2011 FIBA Americas U16 Championship, where Team USA won a gold medal. This qualified the United States for the 2012 FIBA U17 World Championship. The team, which was coached by Don Showalter of Mid-Prairie High School, scored over 100 points in each outing. Parker set the USA U16 single-game scoring record of 27 points. In December 2011, he was named USA Basketball's Male Athlete of the Year based on his FIBA Americas performance, which made him the youngest winner ever. While on the stage to accept the award from Chicago Mayor Rahm Emanuel, he claims that he told the mayor "I hope they don't boo me."

He was selected for the USA team that competed in the 2012 FIBA Under-17 World Championship in Kaunas, Lithuania from June 29 – July 8, 2012, along with Simeon teammate Kendrick Nunn and Whitney Young rival Okafor. The team won the gold medal, although Parker missed some games, including the semifinal, with an ankle injury.

== Player profile ==
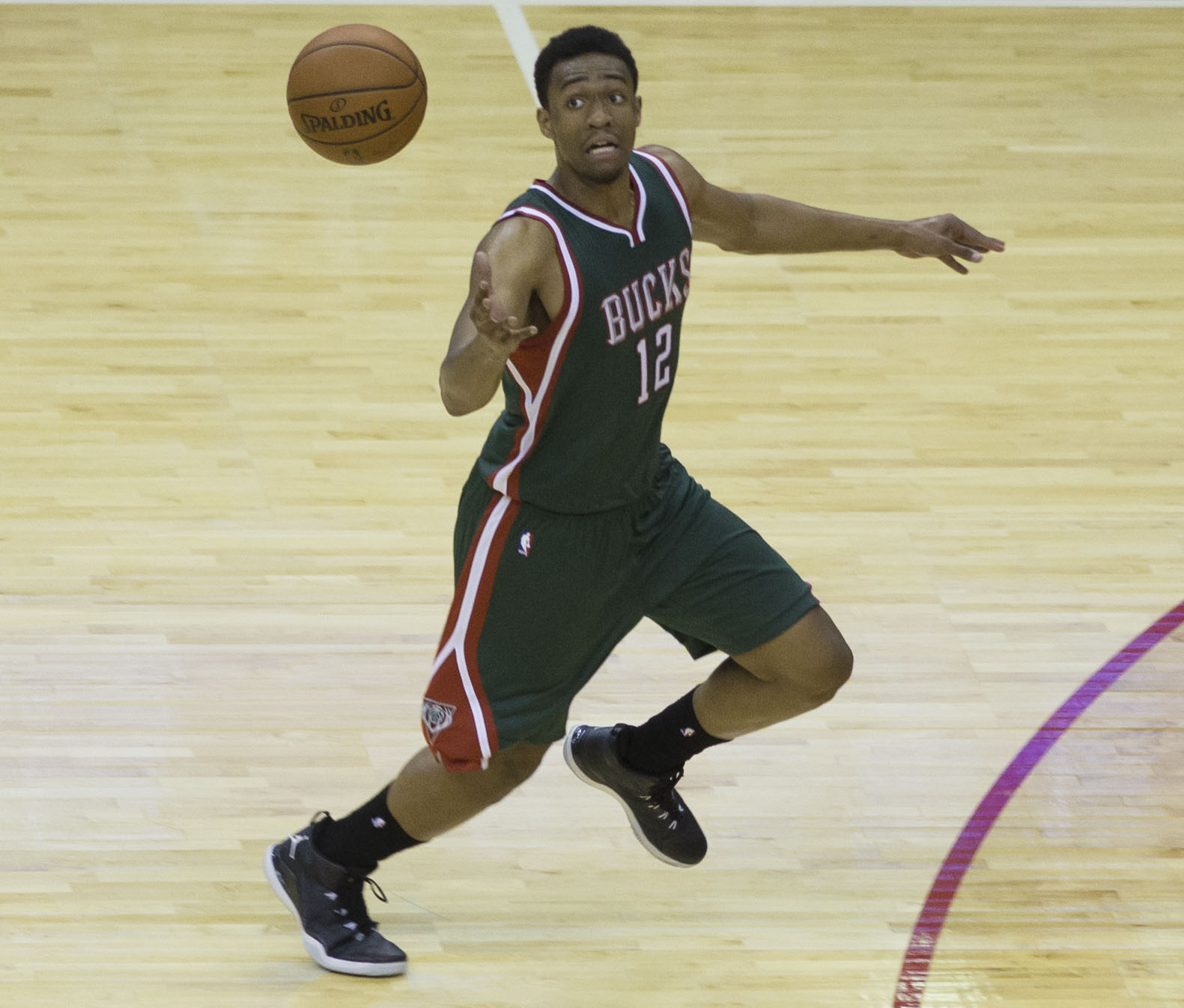
Parker in November 2014

Parker was frequently compared to Derrick Rose in high school. According to Chicago Sun-Times writer Michael O'Brien, as of November 2011, Rose had a 3–0 advantage in defining moments: "the back-to-back dunks against Washington in the city championship at the United Center, the game-winning shot in overtime to give Simeon the state championship against Peoria Richwoods and the dismantling of Oak Hill, the top-ranked team in the country." Rose's game against the Oak Hill team with Brandon Jennings, Nolan Smith and Alex Legion on ESPN is described as Rose's national introduction. Although there are comparisons to Rose, his game is most often compared to Grant Hill and Paul Pierce. Dime Magazine describes him as "Grant Hill with a jump shot". Parker claims to model his game after Paul Pierce and Carmelo Anthony. He hopes to be regarded as the best high school basketball player in the history of the city of Chicago and has stated that "being compared to Derrick also drives me. I know if I get better than him or break the records he broke I could be one of the best players to come out of Chicago. I look forward to being one of those players."

Because of the title of the Sports Illustrated story that compared Parker to LeBron James, Mike DeCourcy of Sporting News stated that "Jabari Parker is, rather, the best [high school basketball player] since Greg Oden." In addition, Parker was considered to have a much less developed physique than James at the same stage of development. CBS Sports' Jeff Borzello also contested the proclamation, pointing out that since James's 2003 class both Dwight Howard (2004) and Oden (2006) were consensus top players in their classes and that Parker might not be any better than the most recent consensus, Oden. In addition, CBS noted that Parker "might not even be the best high school basketball player in the country, given the development of class of 2014's Andrew Wiggins." Chicago Tribune writer Mike Helfgot described the Sports Illustrated comparison as "incredibly irresponsible journalism", noting he had once worked for the Star-Ledger when it described Derrick Caracter as the next James.

Following his four consecutive championships with Simeon, Parker (and Chicago's Simeon) were compared to McClain (and Peoria's Manual). Peoria's Journal Star emphasized that McClain was 32–0 as a starter in IHSA play because in the 1994–97 time period the IHSA was only divided into two classes. Thus, Manual had to wade through an 8-round tournament instead of the 7-round modern 4-class format. However, Simeon won 6 of its 7 games in its final championship by more than 10 points, while Manual only won 3 of its 8 by such a margin. In the postgame press conference, Simeon Coach Smith emphasized that his team had to endure the pressure of playing a national schedule that included games against elite teams in distant venues. Note, that with the 4-class system rather than the 2-class system of the past, the 2013 Class 3A IHSA champion was CPL runner-up Morgan Park, who split 2 neutral court 2013 games with Simeon. As noted above, Rose-era Simeon teams only won 2 championships in the 2-class era. Adding Parker's 55–11 start to a 33–1 junior year and a 30–3 senior season gives him a 118–15 legacy compared to Rose's 120–12.

== Personal life ==
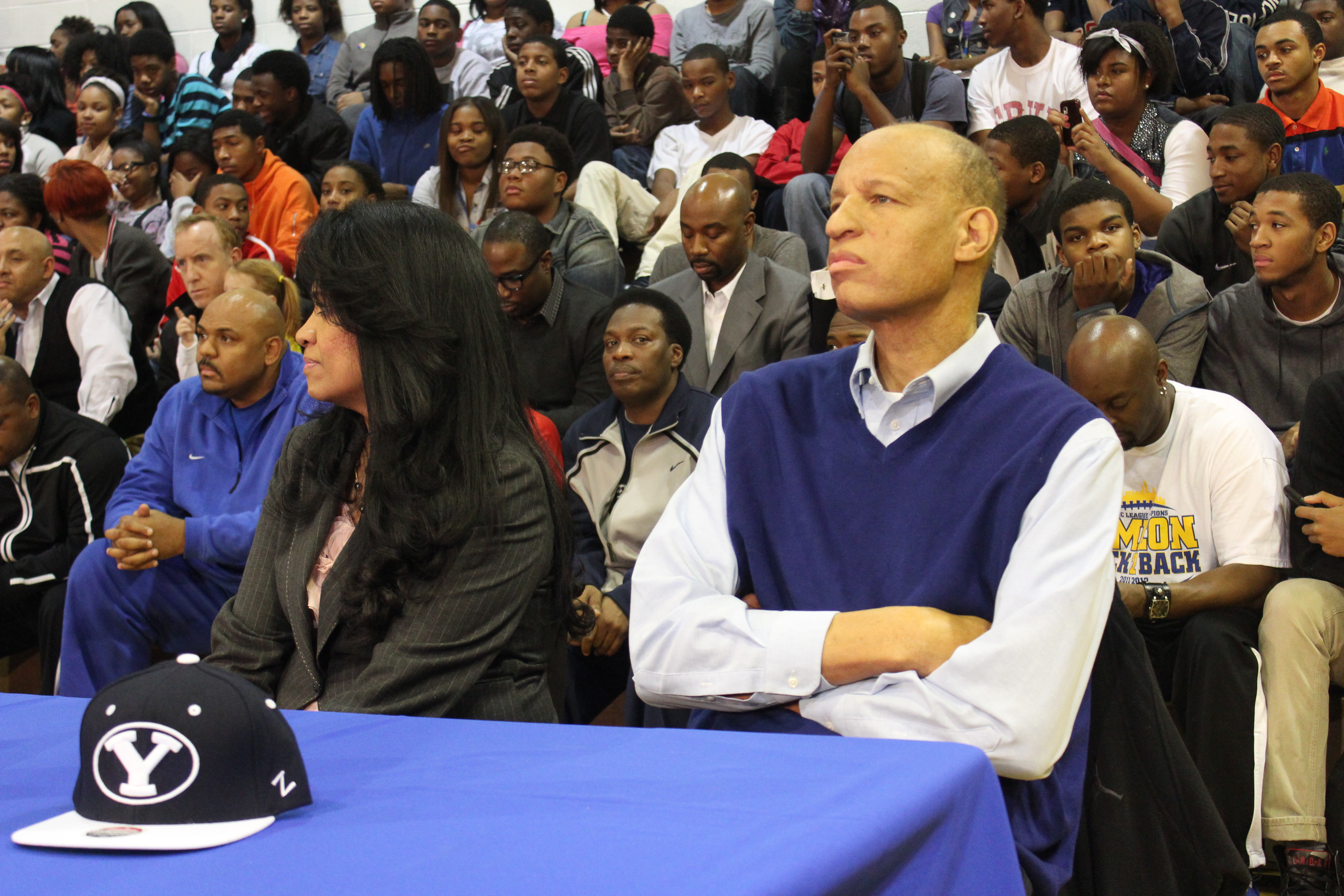
Parents Sonny and Lola listen as Jabari makes his verbal commitment to Duke basketball on December 20, 2012.

Parker is of Tongan and African American descent. His parents are Folola "Lola" Finau-Parker and Sonny Parker. His father, Sonny, a Chicago native, played for the Texas A&M Aggies before becoming a 1976 NBA draft first round selection (17th overall) by the Golden State Warriors. He played in the NBA for six seasons. Sonny was an NBA teammate of former Washington Huskies men's basketball head coach Lorenzo Romar. In 2013, he developed a kidney disease that requires dialysis, making it difficult for him to attend Jabari's games.

His mother, Lola, a Polynesian native of Tonga, is a member of the LDS Church and emigrated to Salt Lake City at age three. Her grandfather was the second Tongan baptized by LDS Church missionaries. Several of Lola's cousins are National Football League athletes, including Harvey Unga, Haloti Ngata, and Tony Moeaki, and one of her first cousins once removed, Tony Finau, made his PGA Tour debut in October 2014. His parents met at a mall when she was a student at Brigham Young University and he was playing for the Warriors. After helping him find a dress shirt, Sonny left her tickets to his game. After he retired and she served her mission, they married and settled in Chicago. The family lives in the South Shore community area where his parents settled after marrying and has turned down two movie offers.

Parker has six siblings. His older brothers are named Darryl and Christian, while his older sisters are named Iman and Tilah. Darryl lettered two years for the Oregon Ducks basketball team, starting for the team in the 1995 NCAA Men's Division I Basketball Tournament. Christian played basketball for Brigham Young University–Hawaii.

Jabari grew up (and remains) an active member of the LDS Church. While attending Simeon Career Academy, Parker attended seminary two mornings a week, according to ESPN, and three days a week, according to The New York Times, Sports Illustrated and Chicago Sun-Times. At the time of his sixteenth birthday, he became a priest (as is customary in his faith). He has both performed baptisms and administered the weekly sacrament. In addition, he regularly traveled with his bishop during his monthly visitations to comfort the sick, the poor, and the elderly.

It was reported that Parker’s high school routine included pick-up games but that he preferred working out with basketball trainer Tim Grover and his older brother, Darryl.

Multiple reports indicate that Parker maintained an A− average in high school, putting him in the top 5% of his high school class. In addition to maintaining the hectic basketball schedule of an elite athlete, Parker’s extracurricular activities included serving as the president of student representatives to the local school council and volunteering (youth basketball, Operation PUSH, The Salvation Army, and the New Beginnings Church).

Awards and achievements
Preceded by Ryan Boatright; Chasson Randle	Illinois Mr. Basketball; 2012, 2013	Succeeded by Jahlil Okafor
