= Coodie & Chike =

American filmmakers (born 1971 & 1978)

Coodie Simmons
- Born: Clarence Ivy Simmons Jr. January 18, 1971 (age 55); Chicago, Illinois, U.S.
- Occupations: Film director; screenwriter; cinematographer; film producer

Chike Ozah
- Born: April 6, 1978 (age 48); New Orleans, Louisiana, U.S.
- Occupations: Film director; screenwriter; cinematographer; film producer

Coodie Simmons (born January 18, 1971) and Chike Ozah (born April 6, 1978) are American film directors, screenwriters, cinematographers, and producers. Coodie and Chike started directing together with their music video for Kanye West entitled "Through the Wire", which was nominated for a MTV Viewers Choice Award, and won a Source Award for Best Music Video of the Year. They have continued their music video success directing "Two Words" and the third version of "Jesus Walks" off Kanye West's The College Dropout album, Pitbull's "Culo" video, Mos Def's "Ghetto Rock" video, Erykah Badu's controversial video "Window Seat" and most recently Lupe Fiasco's "Old School Love" video. The team started directing and producing long form music content with the bonus behind the scene video on Christina Aguilera's Back to Basics album and a music documentary for Wale's The Gifted album.

Coodie & Chike received acclaim for their ESPN 30-for-30 film, Benji (2012), a film about a high school basketball player who was tragically killed. In 2013 they directed Good Morning, a short film for American Family Insurance. Good Morning debuted at the 2013 American Black Film Festival.

== Early life ==
Coodie was born in Chicago, Illinois, as Clarence Ivy Simmons Jr., son of Wendy Simmons and Clarence Ivy Simmons Sr., a CTA Transporter born in South Carolina. His Mother Wendy Simmons was also born and raised in Chicago. She encouraged Coodie to follow his talent for making people laugh by tagging alongside his older sister Tonia Simmons on her radio show. He later on attended Julian High School where he discovered his passion for entertaining people through talent shows and filming. Coodie accredits his older sister Tonia as the one who broke him into media and entertainment. Coodie also has two younger sisters. He jokes around with many by referencing his family to the Huxtables from The Cosby Show. Coodie says: "I was Theo while my older sister Tonia was Denise, but Denise was Vanessa and my baby sister Wendy was Rudy, we was in perfect correlation!" After high school Coodie went on to attend Northern Illinois University where he studied Communications. After one semester he was placed on academic probation, and after a year he was kicked out of the university due to academic and behavioral issues. He has been quoted saying: "being kicked out of college was the best and worst thing to ever happen to me."

Chike was born in New Orleans, Louisiana as Chike Ozah. He attended Saint Martin Episcopal School. He grew up in the inner city neighborhoods. At a young age Chike spent summers in New York, where he would visit art galleries and museum. His mother would work extra hours so that her son could experience new things and attend a private school. He also received a partial scholarship to attend Saint Martin. In the summer before his senior year he went to Rhode Island School of Art - a summer school that is considered by many to be the best art school in the nation. High school is when Chike visualized what he wanted to do with his life. He began experimenting with 3D art design. He then attended Savannah College of Art and Design where he experimented in majors of architecture, product design, film, 3D animation and motion graphics. In college, he took a video art class. After graduating from the Savannah College of Art and Design in Georgia, he began a career in motion graphics. His work brought him to New York, where he created motion design and graphics for MTV. It was in MTV's hallowed halls that Chike first met Coodie.

== Career ==
=== Channel Zero ===
In 1994 Coodie co-founded Channel Zero with his good friend Danny Sorge. The two of them started a show that gained a substantial amount of attention in the inner city streets of Chicago. After graduating from the Savannah College of Art and Design in Georgia, Chike began a career in motion graphics. His work brought him to New York, where he created motion design and graphics for MTV. It was there that Chike first met Coodie,. In 1998 Coodie met Kanye West and began shooting footage of him in efforts to make a documentary about the recently signed to Roc-A-Fella rapper. This then led to Coodie and Chike meeting through the MTV show that at the time Chike was producing called You Heard It First. Kanye and a friend paired the two up in efforts to take the footage that Coodie had gathered up and make a music video out of it. Once they paired up, they produced and directed Kanye's first music video entitled "Through The Wire". They later directed the music video for "Slow Jamz".

=== Creative Control ===
Creative Control is a production company founded in 2007. It became known for music videos such as "Window Seat", and "Old School Love", and has now moved further into traditional film pieces such as: Good Morning, a short film for American Family Insurance that depicted the day to day grind of a nine to five for someone who gave up on their dream; and Benji, a film about the rise and downfall of a high school All-American basketball player who was tragically killed in 1984 one day before the start of the basketball season of his senior year.

Coodie and Chike experience working with a multitude of artist music videos, artist such as: Erykah Badu, Mos Def, Christina Aguilera, Rick Ross, The Black Keys, Joey Badass, Wale, Kanye West, Gil Scott, Common, and Currensy.

=== Works ===
In 2010, Coodie and Chike ran into a small storm of controversy when they released the video entitled "Window Seat", a song written and performed by R&B singer Erykah Badu. The video opens with a November 22, 1963, radio broadcast describing John F. Kennedy's motorcade turning onto Elm Street, Dallas, seconds before fatal shots were fired. Badu is behind the wheel of a 1965 Lincoln Continental, parked along Kennedy's route. A single camera focuses on her as she walks toward Elm Street, when she begins to strip off her clothes. As she reached the spot where Kennedy was first struck by a bullet, the crackle of a gunshot is heard and Badu's head snaps back and she falls to the ground as if dead. The video was shot in one take and took 10 minutes to shoot, but gained a lot of attention on social media and gave Coodie and Chike even more popularity behind their name.

In 2012, Coodie and Chike released their critically acclaimed ESPN 30 for 30 film Benji. The film goes into the life of Benjamin Wilson, who in 1983 was ranked the number one high school basketball player in the nation. The story showed the effect that Wilson's death had on the city of Chicago, and also showed the perspective of the shooter Billy Moore. The story really set things in motion for the "Dynamic Duo" as they began speaking at events sponsored by Nike and the Jordan Brand.

In 2013, Coodie and Chike released a short entitled Good Morning, a film that debuted at the 2013 American Black Film Festival. American Family Insurance sponsored a writer's competition that required the writer to submit a concept to directors. From there directors chose which concept they wanted to create a video on and submit. Good Morning earned first place at the American Black Film Festival.

In 2017, Coodie and Chike created Accel Origins Series, four short videos featuring founders sharing their origin story. Each video dives into the purpose of their entrepreneurial journey. The founders include Lynda Weinman and Bruce Heavin, co-founders of Lynda.com; Jayshree Ullal, President and CEO of Arista; Ryan Smith, co-founder and CEO of Qualtrics; and Amr Awadallah, co-founder and CTO of Cloudera.

In 2022, Coodie and Chike released the documentary series jeen-yuhs: A Kanye Trilogy, Act 1 of which premiered on Netflix on February 16, 2022.

== Personal life ==
Coodie originally wanted to be a comedian and experienced success doing so. In the early 2000s he made appearances on Def Comedy Jam and BET's Comic View. Currently, Coodie & Chike live in New York, where the majority of their time is spent developing content for Creative Control, including films, commercials, and television programming.
