= Ben Wilson (basketball) =

American high school basketball player (1967–1984)

- Wilson in 1984

Personal information
- Born: March 18, 1967 Chicago, Illinois, U.S.
- Died: November 21, 1984 (aged 17) Chicago, Illinois, U.S.
- Listed height: 6 ft 8 in (2.03 m)
- Listed weight: 190 lb (86 kg)

Career information
- High school: Simeon (Chicago, Illinois)
- Position: Guard / forward
- Number: 25

Benjamin Wilson Jr. (March 18, 1967 – November 21, 1984) was an American high school basketball player from Chicago, Illinois. Wilson, a Neal F. Simeon Vocational High School basketball player, was regarded as the top high school player in the U.S. by scouts and coaches attending the 1984 Athletes For Better Education basketball camp. Wilson is noted as the first Chicago athlete to receive this honor. On November 21, 1984, Wilson died due to injuries he sustained in a shooting the day before.

== Early life ==
Born in 1967 to Ben Wilson Sr. and Mary Wilson (née Gunter), Wilson was raised in the Chatham neighborhood on Chicago's South Side. Mary Wilson had two sons from a previous marriage, including Curtis Glenn. She then had sons Anthony and Jeffrey with the elder Wilson, before the couple divorced. Wilson began playing basketball in elementary school. He started at St. Dorothy School and transferred to Ruggles Elementary School, graduating in 1981. Wilson practiced at Cole Park in Chatham and participated in summer league games in Chicago.

As his game developed, friends and family surrounding Wilson began to notice that his talent could make him one of the best players in the sport. They made it a point to protect Wilson from trouble as he got older. As he was entering high school, the nationwide crack epidemic was in full swing. Chicago's violent crime rate was very high during this time as well, especially on the South Side.

== High school career ==
In the fall of 1981, Wilson began his freshman year at Simeon. During the 1982–83 season, he was the only sophomore on the varsity basketball team. For the 1983–84 season, Simeon advanced to the Illinois AA State Championship, which was held at Assembly Hall on the campus of the University of Illinois at Urbana–Champaign. Behind Wilson, Simeon defeated West Aurora High School by nine points in the semifinals and beat top-ranked Evanston Township High School to win their first ever state title.

ESPN HS regarded Wilson as the best junior in the country for the 1983–84 season. He played basketball with R. Kelly and Nick Anderson. Wilson was described as "Magic Johnson with a jump shot" by his Simeon coach, Bob Hambric.

=== Athletes For Better Education (AFBE) ===
In July 1984, Wilson attended the invitation-only Athletes For Better Education camp in Princeton, New Jersey. The camp allowed scouts and coaches to watch top high school students in a single location. After the week-long event, Wilson was ranked the number-one high school player in America. As his senior season approached, it was believed that Wilson was considering scholarship offers from the University of Illinois, DePaul University and Indiana University.

== Death ==
=== Background ===
On Tuesday, November 20, 1984, Wilson decided against lunching with teammates as he wanted to talk to his girlfriend, Jetun Rush, with whom he had been having significant issues. The couple had conceived a child early in 1984, a son named Brandon, and Rush would neither speak to Wilson nor let him see his child. Meanwhile, Calumet High School student Billy Moore was outside Simeon's campus with a .22 caliber revolver, looking to avenge his cousin, who had been allegedly robbed of $10 by a Simeon student.

After finding out the conflict had been resolved, Moore and his friend Omar Dixon decided to stay nearby. Eventually the two followed Moore's friend Erica Murphy to a nearby luncheonette located on South Vincennes Avenue, just up the street from Simeon.

=== The shooting ===
Billy Moore, in the ESPN documentary about Ben Wilson, described what happened next. He and Omar Dixon were outside the luncheonette when Wilson and Rush came up the street behind them. Rush was trying to break away from Wilson, who in his desperation to speak to her, failed to pay attention to where he was going and bumped into Moore. Moore called to Wilson to watch where he was going, and Wilson responded by turning around and heading back toward Moore. The two engaged in a loud argument, with an infuriated Wilson and Moore exchanging expletives.

During the argument, Moore drew the pistol he had been carrying. Wilson taunted him and dared him to shoot. Moore later said he felt that the much larger Wilson was just "punking" him. Wilson then lunged at Moore, who responded by firing two shots at him. The first struck Wilson in his groin while the second struck him in his abdomen, and caused significant internal bleeding. Moore and Dixon then fled. Within minutes, word of the shooting reached Simeon's campus, and a crowd gathered near Wilson. Emergency services were called at 12:37 PM local time, while Simeon basketball coach Bob Hambric made a call to WMAQ-TV newsman Warner Saunders and informed him of what happened.

Hambric felt that paramedics were slow in reaching the scene and at approximately 1:20 PM, Hambric decided to take it upon himself to get his star player to the hospital. Just as he was getting into his car, an ambulance arrived at the scene on South Vincennes Avenue. According to Chicago's then emergency protocol, Wilson was taken to the nearest available hospital, which was St. Bernard Hospital in Englewood. St. Bernard was a small community hospital that was not equipped to handle emergencies or trauma cases like shootings, so a call was put out for any available trauma surgeon to report immediately to St. Bernard.

=== Aftermath ===
At Simeon, the basketball team remained sequestered in the teachers' lounge for the rest of the day. Wilson's teammate Teri Sampson recalls that throughout the night, the reports progressively worsened, going from Wilson possibly recovering in time for the state playoffs, to perhaps missing a year of play, to possibly never playing again, to fighting for his life.

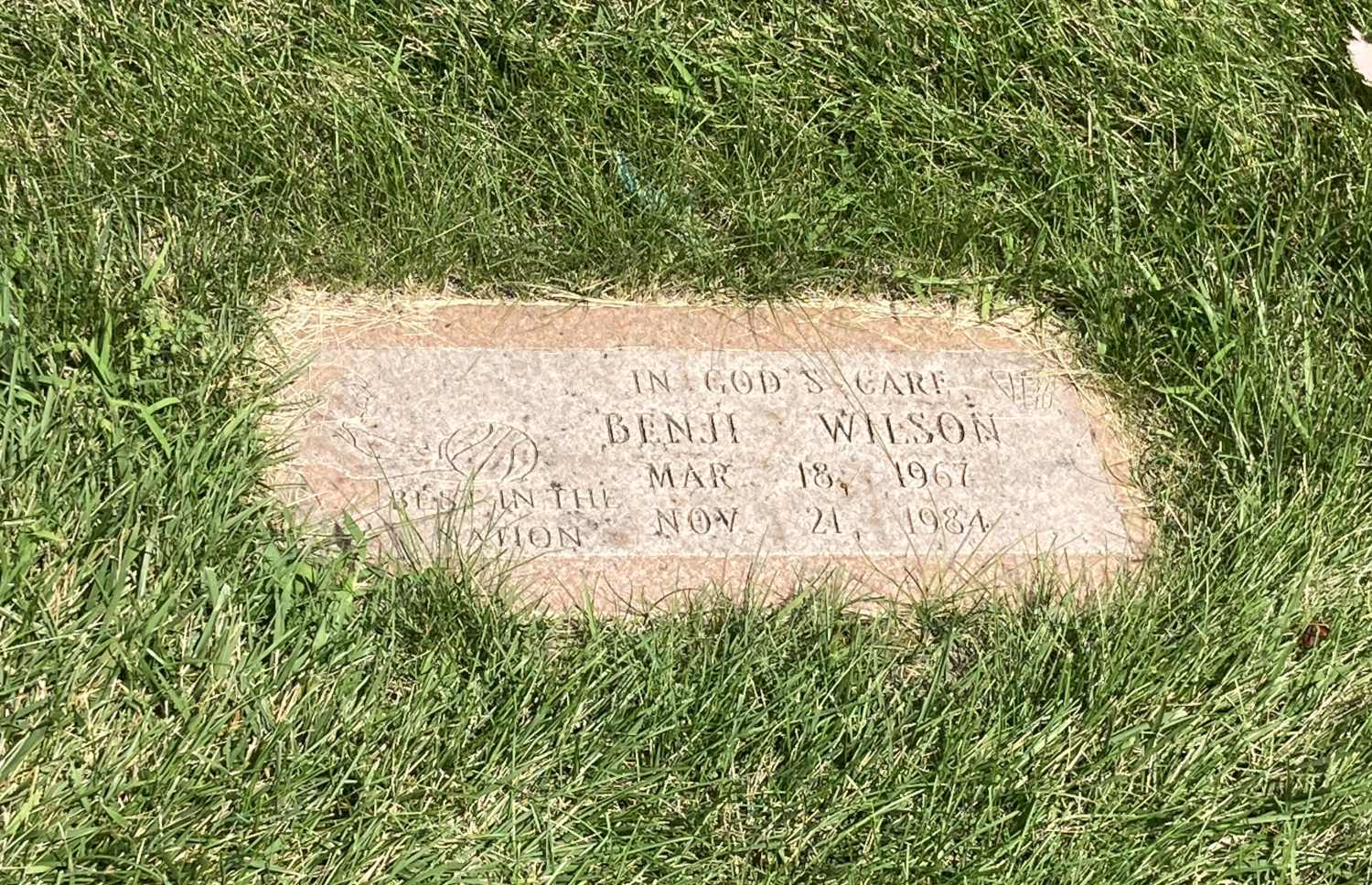
Wilson's grave at Oak Woods Cemetery

Wilson's brother Curtis Glenn recounted in the ESPN documentary seeing his brother being wheeled by him in the hospital and noticing his feet were unnaturally pale. Upon examination it was discovered that Wilson's aorta was damaged by the second shot and there was no blood reaching his lower extremities. Despite doctors repeatedly telling her they could save her son, Mary Wilson's professional experience as a nurse told her that even if they were able to repair the damage, Ben would likely be in a persistent vegetative state afterward due to the massive blood he had already lost. Early the next morning, Mary Wilson asked that her son be taken off of life support, and Ben Wilson died shortly thereafter. He was buried at Oak Woods Cemetery.

Soon after the shooting, Erica Murphy returned to her home to find Billy Moore sitting in her living room watching television. It was through this that he discovered who he had shot. Moore remained there until the police began pounding on Murphy's door looking for him later that evening. Dixon's arrest followed, with the charges upgraded to murder once word of Wilson's death reached the police. Police presented both suspects with a case theory that after Moore's conflict with Wilson, Dixon tried to pick Wilson's pockets, and then urged Moore to shoot Wilson. Both young men signed confessions to that effect that were later recanted. Due to the senseless violence, the Cook County State’s Attorney's office elected to try both Dixon and Moore as adults.

At their trial, the prosecutors presented the same case theory to the jury when the trial began the following year. Jetun Rush was the prosecution's lead witness and testified to the same effect. Moore and Dixon's attorneys chose to present Wilson's celebrity as the primary reason for the charges against the two teenagers. Both Moore and Dixon were convicted on charges of murder and attempted armed robbery and both were given significant prison sentences. Moore received a 40-year sentence while Dixon received a 30-year sentence. Dixon was given a lesser sentence since Moore had been the one to fire the fatal shots at Wilson.

The Wilson family's lawsuit against the hospital for what they felt was inappropriate delay of medical care was settled in 1992 for an undisclosed amount. Dixon was released on parole in 2000, and Moore in 2005. Dixon later began yet another unrelated sentence for armed robbery, although Moore, interviewed in the 2012 documentary Benji, attempted to claim that his own confession was coerced. Wilson died on the same day that Simeon was to open its season. The team chose to play the game, a rematch with Evanston, and won.

== Personal life ==
Wilson had one son, Brandon Sherrod Wilson, born September 1984, with his high school girlfriend Jetun Rush. Brandon, who was 10 weeks old when his father died, went on to play basketball at the University of Maryland-Eastern Shore, wearing Wilson's number 25. He played professionally with the Long Island Wizards and later became a coach. He also attended and graduated from the Nassau Police Academy, serving in the Port Washington Police Department for five years. On January 13, 2022, Brandon died in a car accident after swerving into a shoulder on the Northern State Parkway and hitting a pole and two trees.

== Legacy ==
Wilson's friend and Simeon teammate, former NBA and University of Illinois basketball player Nick Anderson, wore jersey number 25 during his career in Wilson's honor. Juwan Howard wore 25 at the University of Michigan as a tribute to Wilson. Former Chicago Bulls guard Derrick Rose, who graduated from Simeon in 2007, wore number 25, and the team won the state championship in 2006 and 2007. He also wore number 25 with the New York Knicks, after being traded. Simeon basketball player Jabari Parker had the number 25 stitched into the team sneakers during his time at Simeon.

Following Nick Anderson's tribute to Wilson in wearing number 25 at Illinois, many others who graduated from Simeon and moved on to play for the Illini have carried on the tradition of wearing the jersey number 25. In the years since his murder in 1984, Deon Thomas, Bryant Notree, Calvin Brock, and Kendrick Nunn have all worn 25 during their basketball career at Illinois to honor Wilson. ESPN premiered a documentary on Wilson titled Benji on October 23, 2012.

== See also ==
- List of homicides in Illinois
