= Deon Thomas =

American-Israeli basketball player

Deon Thomas דיון תומאס
Personal information
- Born: February 24, 1971 (age 55) Chicago, Illinois, U.S.
- Listed height: 6 ft 9 in (2.06 m)
- Listed weight: 238 lb (108 kg)

Career information
- High school: Simeon (Chicago, Illinois)
- College: Illinois (1990–1994)
- NBA draft: 1994: 2nd round, 28th overall pick
- Drafted by: Dallas Mavericks
- Playing career: 1994–2008
- Position: Forward

Career history
- 1994–1995: Bàsquet Manresa
- 1995–1996: Girona
- 1996–1997: Unicaja Málaga
- 1997–1998: Caja San Fernando
- 1998–1999: Maccabi Rishon LeZion
- 1999–2001: Gran Canaria
- 2001–2003: Cáceres
- 2003: Türk Telekom
- 2003–2005: Maccabi Tel Aviv
- 2005–2006: Gymnastikos S. Larissas
- 2006: CSKA Sofia
- 2006–2007: Maccabi Giv'at Shmuel
- 2007–2008: Maccabi Haifa

Career highlights
- 2× Euroleague champion (2004, 2005); 3× Israeli League champion (2003, 2004, 2005); 3× Israeli Cup champion (2003, 2004, 2005); Andalucian Cup champion (1998); Catalan League champion (1996); McDonald's All-American (1989); First-team Parade All-American (1989); Illinois Mr. Basketball (1989)
- Stats at Basketball Reference

Deon La velle Thomas (Hebrew: דיון תומאס; born February 24, 1971) is an American-Israeli former basketball player. As a high school player, he led his team to the Chicago Public League title, and was named Illinois Mr. Basketball. As a college player at the University of Illinois, he finished his career as the all-time leading scorer in Fighting Illini history. Selected by the Dallas Mavericks with the 28th selection of the 1994 NBA draft, he opted to play professional basketball in Europe and Israel.

== High school career ==
Thomas was a star basketball player at Chicago's Neal F. Simeon Vocational High School, graduating in 1989. As a junior in 1988, he led the Wolverines to the Chicago Public League title. As a senior, he was named Illinois Mr. Basketball and played in the McDonald's All-American Game, which also featured future NBA star Shaquille O'Neal.

== College career ==
Thomas played college basketball at the University of Illinois. Thomas finished his career as the all-time leading scorer in Fighting Illini history, with 2,129 career points scored and an 18.0 points per game scoring average. Thomas is the only men's basketball player in Illinois history to score at least 2,000 career points. Thomas was elected to the "Illini Men's Basketball All-Century Team" in 2004.

== Professional career ==
Thomas was selected by the Dallas Mavericks with the 28th selection of the 1994 NBA draft. Thomas attended mini camp but never played in the NBA, having opted to play professional basketball in Europe and Israel. Thomas played two years in Israel for Maccabi Tel Aviv, winning the Israeli championship, the Israeli cup, and the Euroleague championship twice. Thomas didn't play in the 2005 Final Four due to a broken leg. This injury forced him to leave Maccabi Tel Aviv. He then joined the Greek team Gymnastikos S. Larissas, the Bulgarian team CSKA Sofia, and then returned to Israel where he played for Givat Shmuel. He then played for Maccabi Haifa, also in Israel.

He is one of the most successful American pros of all time in the European leagues. Thomas has passed on several opportunities to play in the NBA. On 13 November 2006, in an interview for Bulgarian newspaper Tema Sport and Bulgarian television "Channel 3", Deon Thomas denied any wrongdoing and swore that he didn't receive anything from University of Illinois, as Bruce Pearl had claimed. He said the decision to play for Illinois was made by his grandmother.

== Coaching/Announcing Career ==
In 2009, Thomas became the men's basketball head coach at Lewis and Clark Community College in Godfrey, Illinois. In April 2014, Thomas was named as an assistant basketball coach at the University of Illinois-Chicago. In 2016, he was hired by Fighting Illini Sports Network to call men's basketball games with Doug Altenberger.

== Personal life ==
Thomas is the father of two daughters and is a radio analyst for the Fighting Illini Sports Network.

== Honors ==
=== High school ===
- 1988 – IHSA 1st Team All-State
- 1988 – IHSA State Tournament All-Tournament Team
- 1989 – IHSA 1st Team All-State
- 1989 – Parade Magazine 1st Team All-American
- 1989 – McDonald's All-American
- 1989 – Illinois Mr. Basketball
- 2015 – Inducted into the Illinois Basketball Coaches Association's Hall of Fame as a player.

=== College ===
- 1991 – 3rd Team All-Big Ten
- 1992 – Illini Team Co-Captain
- 1992 – Illini MVP
- 1992 – 2nd Team All-Big Ten
- 1993 – Illini Team Co-Captain
- 1993 – Illini MVP
- 1993 – 2nd Team All-Big Ten
- 1994 – Illini Team Co-Captain
- 1994 – Illini MVP
- 1994 – 2nd Team All-Big Ten
- 1994 – Honorable Mention All American
- 2004 – Elected to the "Illini Men's Basketball All-Century Team".
- 2008 – Honored jersey which hangs in the State Farm Center to show regard for being the most decorated basketball players in the University of Illinois' history.
- 2019 – Inducted into the Illinois Athletics Hall of Fame

== College statistics ==
=== University of Illinois ===
Season	Games	Points	PPG	Field Goals	Attempts	Avg	Free Throws	Attempts	Avg	Rebounds	Avg	Assists	APG	Blocks	BPG	Steals	SPG
1990–91	30	452	15.1	172	298	.577	108	168	.643	203	6.8	18	0.6	54	1.8	10	0.3
1991–92	28	542	19.4	199	340	.585	144	218	.661	193	6.9	20	0.7	44	1.6	25	0.9
1992–93	32	587	18.3	225	371	.606	137	212	.646	256	8.0	37	1.2	42	1.3	17	0.5
1993–94	28	548	19.6	207	327	.633	133	192	.693	194	6.9	43	1.5	37	1.3	23	0.8
Totals	118	2,129*	18.0	803*	1336	.601	522	790*	.661	846	7.2	118	1.0	177	1.5	75	0.6

* All-time leader in University of Illinois history

Awards and achievements
Preceded by Eric Anderson	Illinois Mr. Basketball Award Winner; 1989	Succeeded by Jamie Brandon
