= Archer Heights, Chicago =

Community area in Chicago, Illinois

Archer Heights
- Community area
- Community Area 57 - Archer Heights
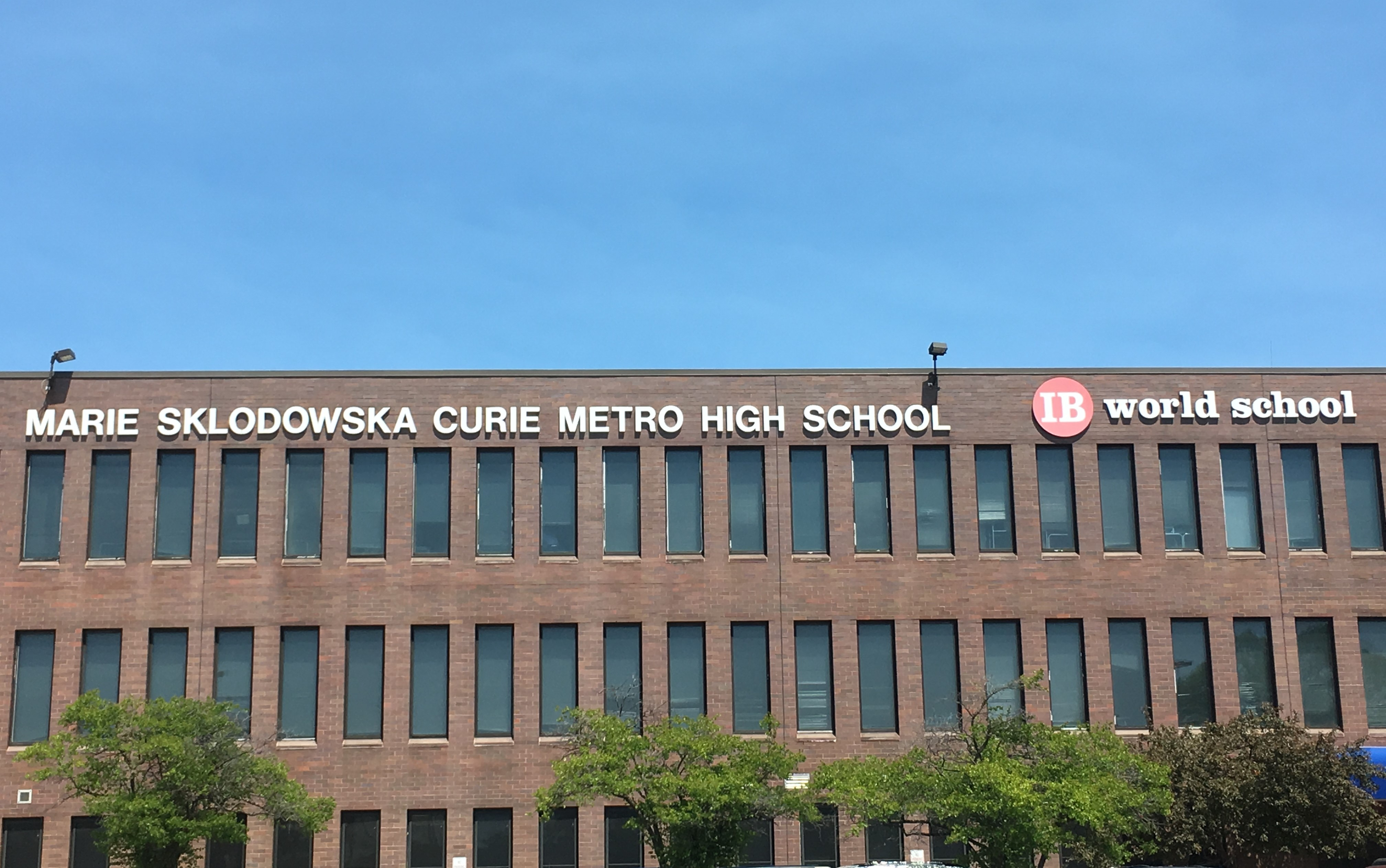
- Curie Metropolitan High School at Archer Avenue and Pulaski Road.

- Location within the city of Chicago
- Coordinates: 41°48.6′N 87°43.8′W
- Country: United States
- State: Illinois
- County: Cook
- City: Chicago
- Neighborhoods: list: Archer Heights

Area
  - Total: 2.01 sq mi (5.21 km^{2})

Population (2024)
  - Total: 13,414
  - Density: 6,670/sq mi (2,570/km^{2})

Demographics 2024
  - White: 12.9%
  - Black: 1.6%
  - Hispanic: 79.5%
  - Asian: 5.9%
  - Other: 0.2%

Educational Attainment 2024
  - High School Diploma or Higher: 68.3%
  - Bachelor's Degree or Higher: 13.6%
- Time zone: UTC-6 (CST)
  - Summer (DST): UTC-5 (CDT)
- ZIP Codes: parts of 60632
- Median income: $50,458
- Source: U.S. Census, Record Information Services

Archer Heights is a community area in Chicago, Illinois, one of the 77 official community areas of Chicago.

Archer Avenue runs from south of Chicago's downtown area, through the southwest side of Chicago and beyond into the southwest suburbs, along what was once a Native American trail. The neighborhood is bounded by the Stevenson Expressway to the north, the CTA Orange Line to the south, the Corwith railyard to the east, and the railroad tracks/Knox Avenue to the west.

== History ==
Archer Heights was originally inhabited by Native American tribes. Starting in the nineteenth century, land speculators and farmers sparked interest in the swampy lands. The land became a primary focus for real-estate developers and manufacturers. It gained exceptional interest from William B. Archer, an Illinois & Michigan Canal commissioner and land speculator from whom Archer Heights gained its name.

After speculators came in in 1900 and developed the southern sections of Archer Heights for residential use, railroads sustained control of the north side real estate. Due to horse cars in the late 1890s, and electric streetcars gaining popularity in the early 1900s, immigrant laborers started to pour into Archer Heights. Starting in the 1920s and 1930s, Archer Heights had its largest population growth coming from the Polish, Italian, Czech, and Russian Jewish communities. During this time modern urban groundwork and two Catholic parishes, St. Bruno's (1925) and St. Richard's (1938), helped stimulate population growth.

After World War II population began to make a comeback; between 1930 and 1950, the Archer Heights community grew from 8,120 to 8,675. In the following years the population sprouted to 10,584, peaking by 1970 at 11,143. However, by 1980, the population fell off to 9,708, and continued to do so in 1990 falling to 9,227.

For over 90 years, the Archer Heights community has been predominantly white (96 percent in 1990), with a large contingent of foreign-born residents (27 percent in 1990), and a strong Polish cohort. In the 1990s, Hispanics, and primarily Mexicans, rose to 8 percent of the population. "While Archer Heights continues to be home to a large Polish community, since 2000 it became the latest swath of the Southwest Side bungalow belt where Hispanics have become the majority."

At the end of the twentieth century, approximately 60 percent of the area was dedicated to manufacturing and bulk transportation facilities, 30 percent to residences, and 10 percent to commerce.

Historical population
Census	Pop.	Note	%±
1930	8,120		—
1940	8,216		1.2%
1950	8,675		5.6%
1960	10,584		22.0%
1970	11,158		5.4%
1980	9,708		−13.0%
1990	9,227		−5.0%
2000	12,656		37.2%
2010	13,393		5.8%
2020	14,196		6.0%

== Services ==
=== Education ===
==== CPS District-Run Schools ====
Chicago Public Schools (CPS) has two district-run schools in Archer Heights:

- Curie Metropolitan High School

S Archer Ave, Chicago, IL 60632

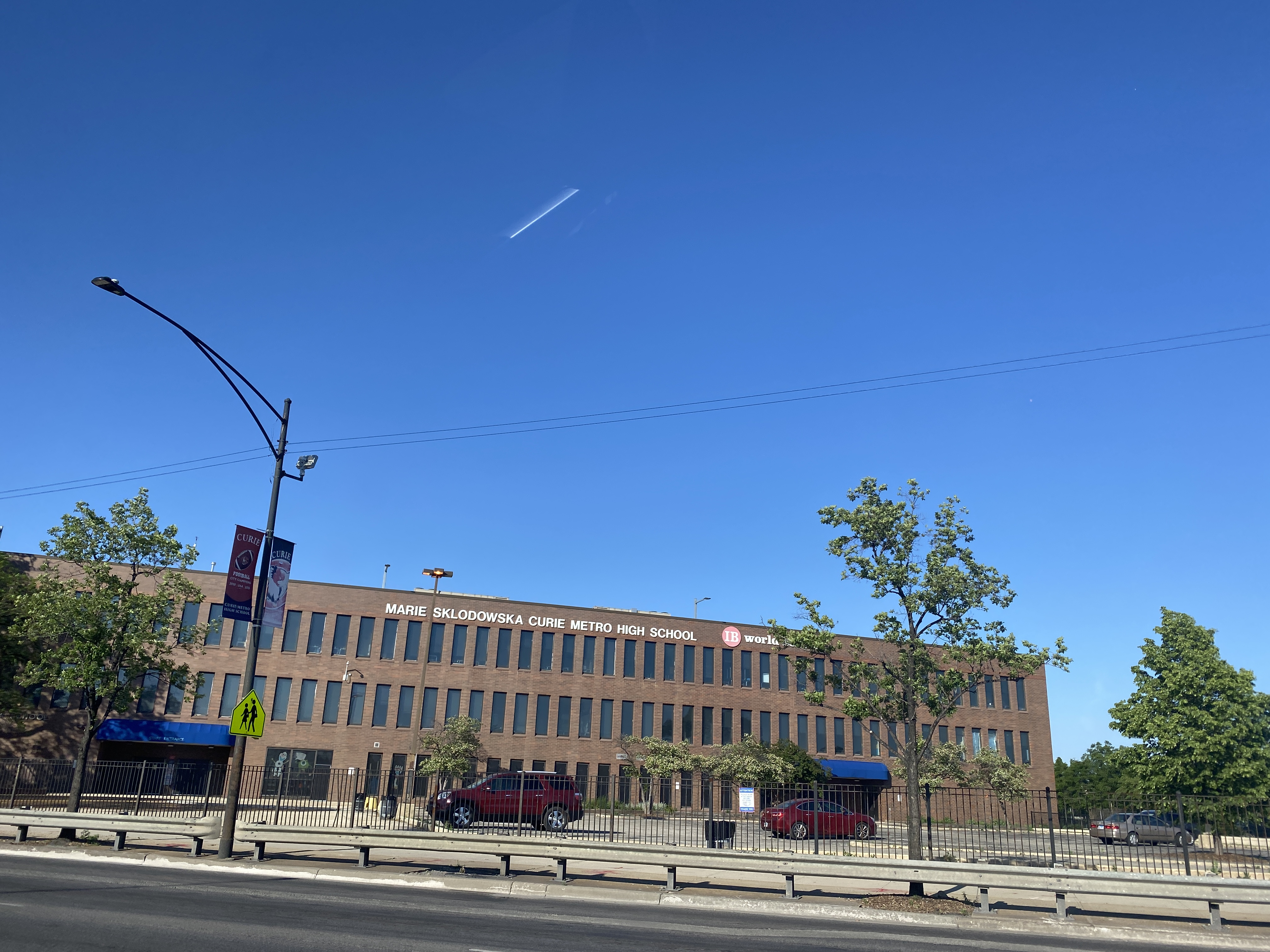
Curie High School

- Edwards Elementary School

4815 South Karlov Avenue, Chicago, IL 60632 http://edwardsib.org

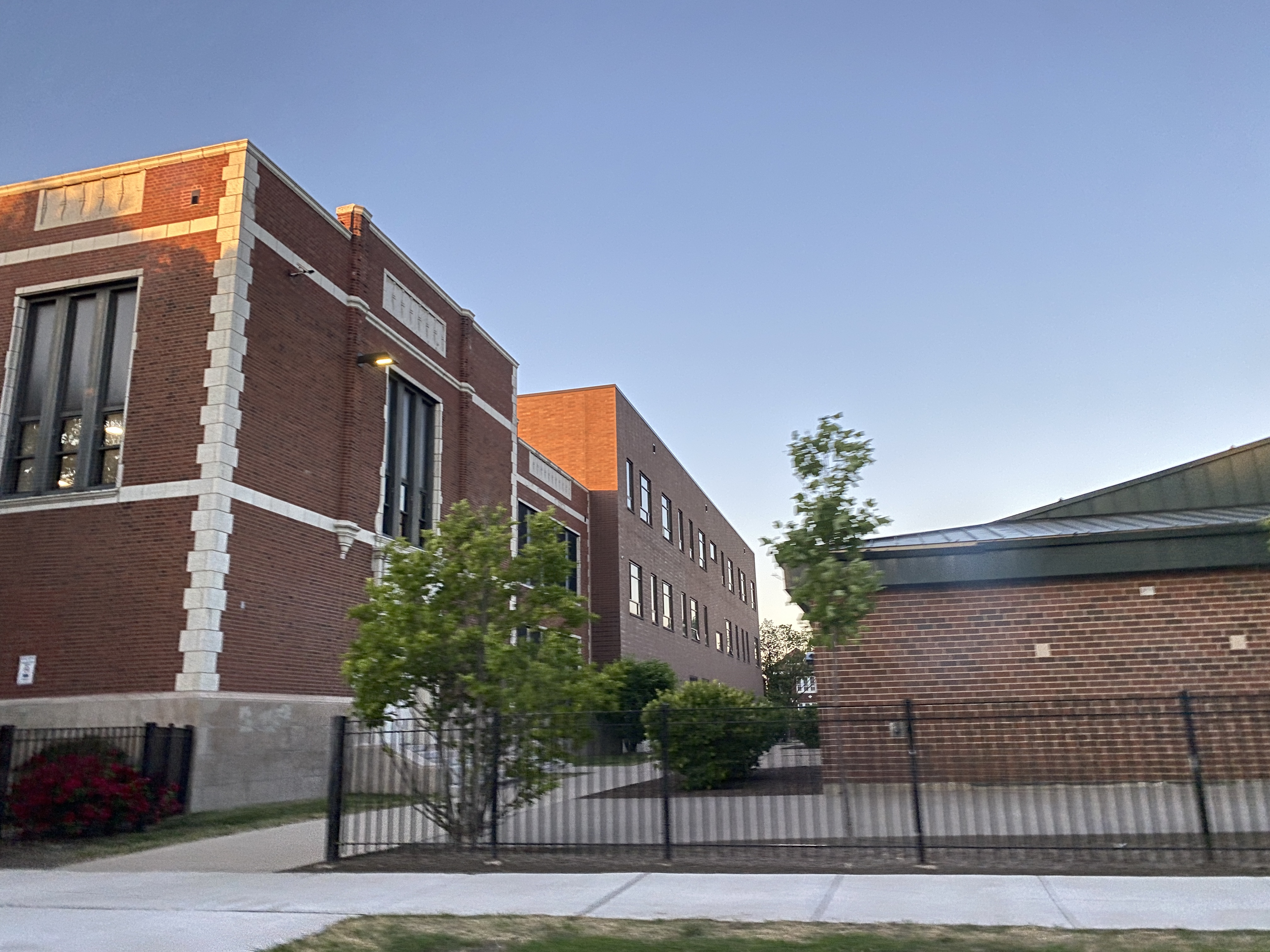

==== CPS Charter Schools ====
The United Neighborhood Organization operates the charter schools in Archer Heights

- UCSN Major Hector P. Garcia MD High School

4248 W 47th St, Chicago, IL 60632

http://www.ucsnschools.org

- UCSN PFC Omar E. Torres School

4248 W 47th St, Chicago, IL 60632

http://www.ucsnschools.org

- Academy for Global Citizenship (Elementary)

4647 W. 47th St. Chicago, IL 60632

http://schoolinfo.cps.edu/schoolprofile/schooldetails.aspx?SchoolId=400009

- SPC Daniel Zizumbo School

4248 W 47th St Chicago, IL 60632

https://web.archive.org/web/20160625180632/https://www.incschools.org/school/ucsn-spc-daniel-zizumbo/

==== Catholic schools ====
- St. Richard School (Elementary)

5025 S. Kenneth Ave. Chicago, IL 60632

http://www.strichard.net

- St. Bruno School (Elementary)

4839 S. Harding Ave. Chicago, IL 60632

http://stbruno.com

=== Library ===
Archer Heights Public Library

The Archer Heights public library is a 6 million dollar, 14,000 sq/ft building located at 5055 S. Archer Ave. Chicago Illinois. The library is home to over 49,000 materials ranging from books, magazines, book tapes, and newspapers.

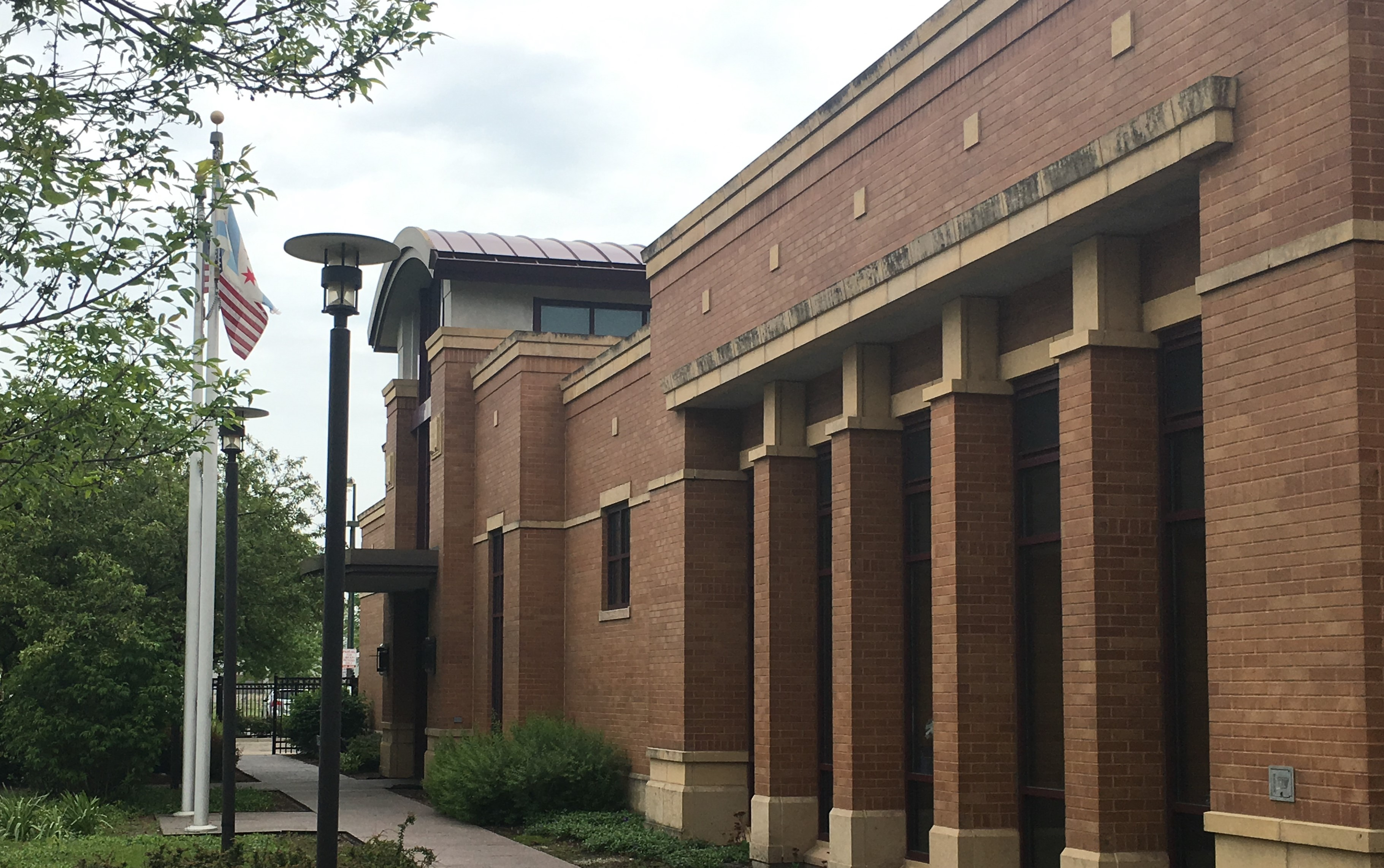
Archer Heights Public Library (May 2016)

Link

- http://www.chipublib.org/locations/4/

=== Houses of Worship ===
Church Name	Address
New Life Community Church Midway	5101 S Keeler Ave, Chicago, IL 60632
St. Bruno Catholic Church	4751 S. Harding Ave. Chicago, IL 60632
St. Richard Parish	5032 S. Kostner Ave. Chicago, IL 60632

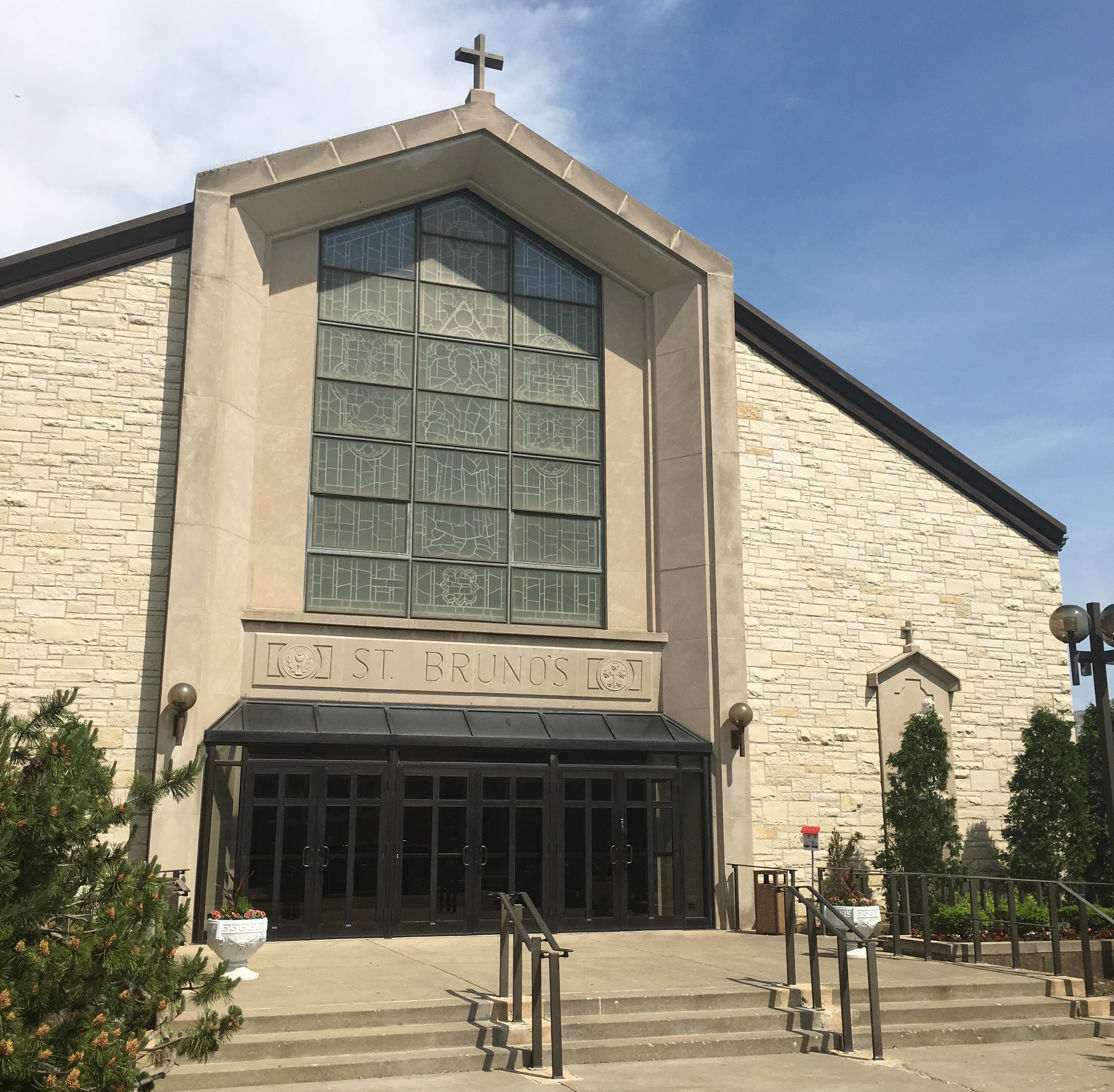
St. Bruno Church Archer Heights (May 2016)

=== Transportation ===
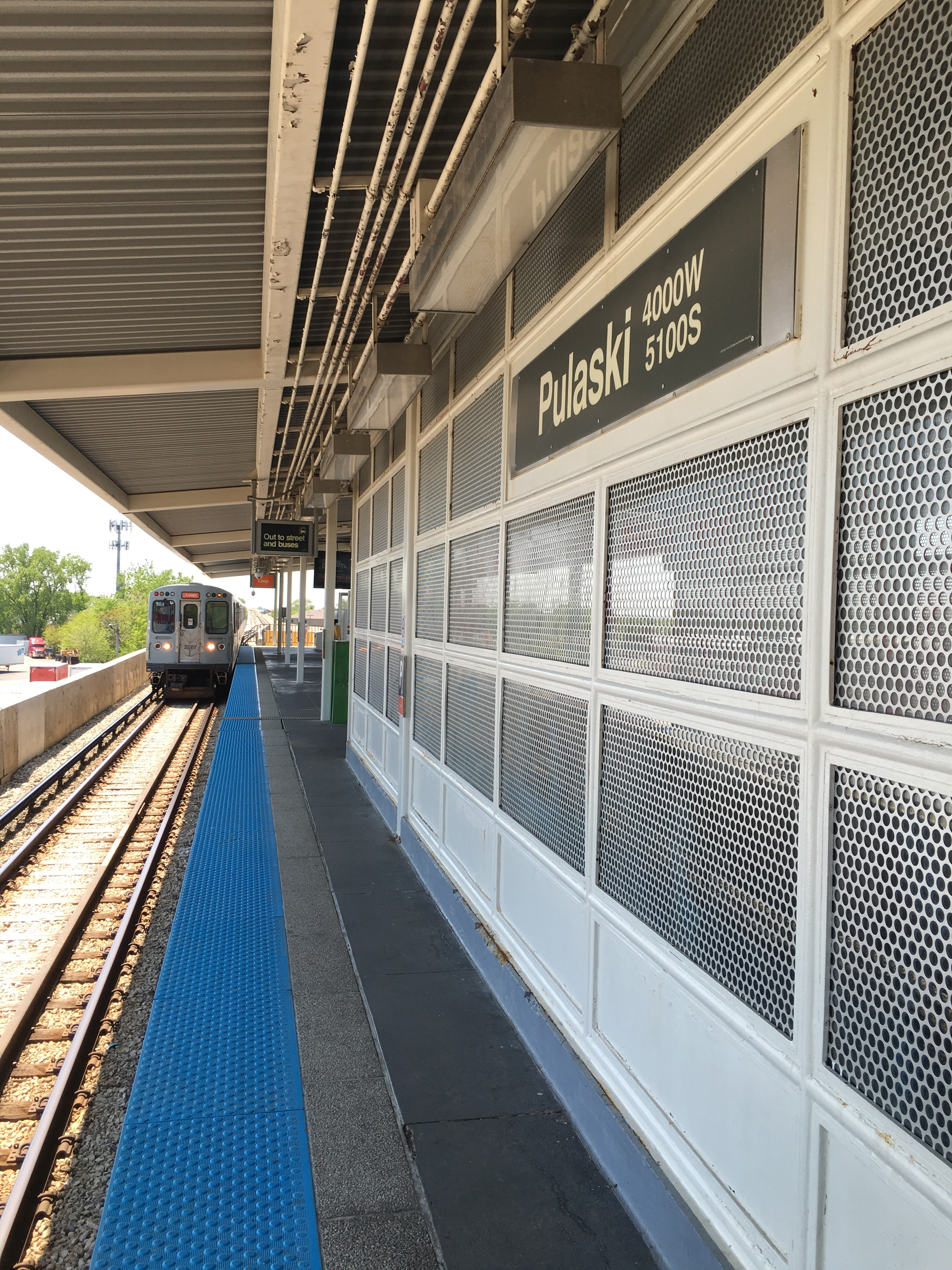
Inbound Orange Line Train at Pulaski Station (May 2016)

Historically, transportation between downtown Chicago and the Southwest Side was limited to express buses that traveled down the Stevenson Expressway. The Orange Line was created in 1993 to solve this issue. Pulaski station was built as an Orange Line stop at the corner of Pulaski Road and 51st Street near Archer Avenue.

== Politics ==
The Archer Heights community area has supported the Democratic Party in the past two presidential elections by overwhelming margins. In the 2016 presidential election, the Archer Heights cast 2,803 votes for Hillary Clinton and cast 527 votes for Donald Trump (81.22% to 15.27%). In the 2012 presidential election, Archer Heights cast 2,140 votes for Barack Obama and cast 494 votes for Mitt Romney (80.03% to 18.47%).

=== Non-Profit Organizations ===
==== Archer Heights Civic Association ====
Founded in 1938, Archer Heights Civic Association (AHCA) is the oldest active neighborhood organization in Southwest Chicago, serving the Archer Heights community. In 1968, AHCA had meetings with local aldermen and the Chicago Park District Superintendent to present a list of improvements needed at Archer Park, including a field house. The Archer Park field house eventually opened in 1970. Originally formed as a homeowner's association, AHCA also functions as a community watchdog, for example, pressuring for enforcement of zoning laws.

==== Others ====
- Greater Chicago Food Depository
- Chicago Electrical Trauma Rehabilitation Institute
- Polish Highlanders Alliance of North America

== Local parks ==
Park Name	Address
Curie Park	4949 S. Archer Ave. Chicago, IL 60632
Archer Park	4901 S. Kilbourn Ave. Chicago, IL 60632
Irma C. Ruiz Park (formerly Walnut Park)	3801 W.45th St. Chicago, IL 60632
Kujawa Park (formerly Catalpa Park)	4324 S. Kedvale Ave. Chicago, IL 60632

== Honored residents ==
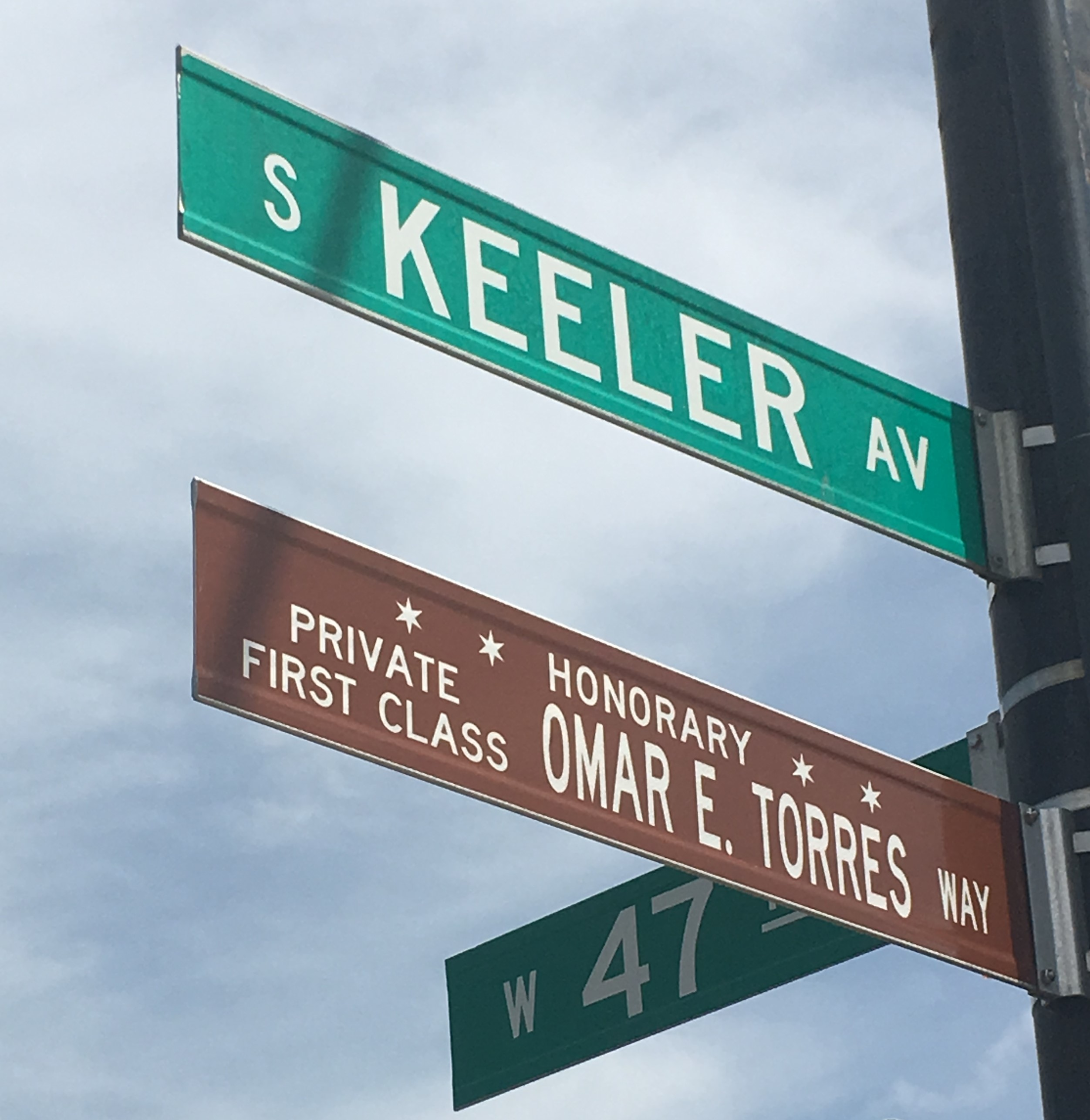
Image of Omar E. Torres Way, Honorary Street Sign (May 2016)

- 48th Street and Harding Avenue dedicated an honorary street sign to recognize Henry J. "Hank" Rutkowski Sr. Rutkowski is a decorated World War II veteran and former prisoner of war. He received the Good Conduct Medal, the Air Medal, the European Theatre of War Medal, and the Prisoner of War Medal. Following the war he worked for 40 years for Schulze & Birch. He retired in 1993.
- 47th Street and Keeler Avenue dedicated a street sign for Omar Torres. Private First Class Omar E. Torres died in combat in Iraq, 2007. Torres was one of three children. He and his sister Oralia and brother, Oscar Jr., were raised by Doris and Oscar Torres Sr.

== Events ==
- St. Bruno Catholic Church Carnival
- St. Richard Family Fest and Carnival and Rocket Run 5k
  - http://www.strichardrocketrun.com/
  - https://web.archive.org/web/20151008061438/http://strichard.wix.com/carnival

== Government ==
Archer Heights is in the 4th Congressional District and is represented in the United States Congress by Jesús "Chuy" García.

Alderman Edward M. Burke served the 14th ward of Chicago for over 50 years.Jeylú Gutiérrez represents the eastern part of Archer Heights and was elected alderman for the 14th ward in the 2023 election and is currently serving 14th Ward. Alderman Michael D. Rodriguez serves the 22nd ward on the Western part of Archer Heights. Michael R. Zalewski is the alderman for the 23rd ward.

Archer Heights is also represented in the 1st district of the Illinois Senate and House, their Senator is Democrat Javier Loera Cervantes and their House Rep. is Assistant Majority Leader, and 14th Ward Democratic Committeeman Aaron Ortiz. Alma Anaya is the Cook County Commissioner from the 7th District.

== Newspapers ==
=== South Chicago Post ===
http://www.swchicagopost.com

=== Southwest news Herald ===
http://swnewsherald.com
