= Matt Cole =

American football player (born 1996)

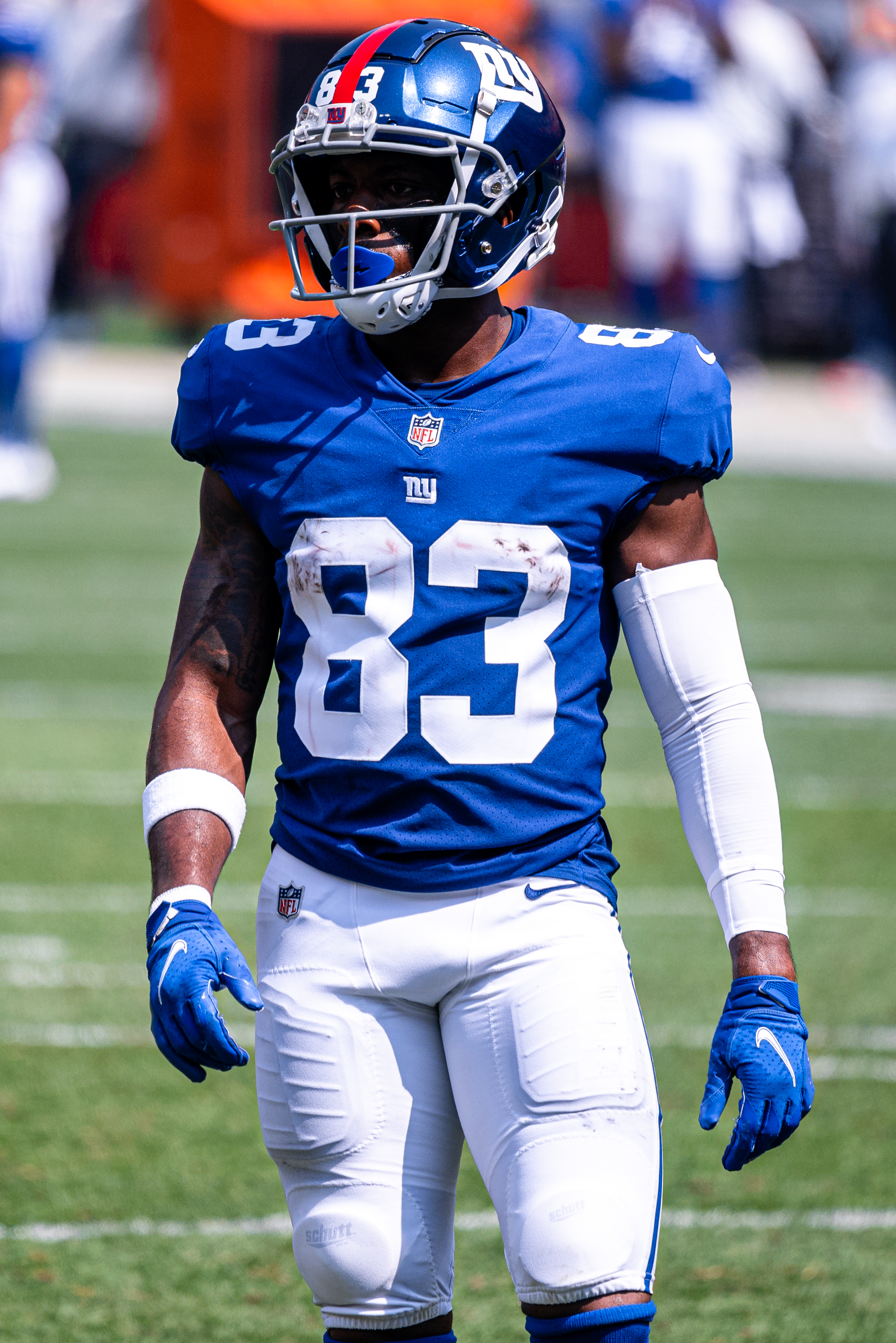
- Cole with the New York Giants in 2021

Panthers Wrocław
- Position: Wide receiver

Personal information
- Born: November 7, 1996 (age 30); Chicago, Illinois, U.S.
- Listed height: 5 ft 10 in (1.78 m)
- Listed weight: 197 lb (89 kg)

Career information
- High school: Curie Metropolitan (Chicago)
- College: McKendree
- NFL draft: 2020: undrafted

Career history
- Miami Dolphins (2020)*; San Francisco 49ers (2020); New York Jets (2021)*; New York Giants (2021)*; Carolina Panthers (2021); Seattle Seahawks (2021–2022)*; Washington Commanders (2022)*; Winnipeg Blue Bombers (2023)*; Wrocław Panthers (2024–present)
- * Offseason or practice squad member only

Awards and highlights
- GLVC Special Teams Player of the Year (2019); First-team All-GLVC (2019)

Career NFL statistics
- Games played: 2
- Tackles: 3
- Stats at Pro Football Reference

Matt Cole (born November 7, 1996) is an American professional football wide receiver for the Wrocław Panthers of the European League of Football (ELF). He played college football for the McKendree Bearcats.

== College career ==
After graduating from Chicago's Curie Metropolitan High School, Cole played for the McKendree Bearcats as a wide receiver and return specialist. As a senior, he was named the Great Lakes Valley Conference (GLVC) Special Teams Player of the Year and first-team All-GLVC after catching 43 passes for 939 yards and 12 touchdowns while also returning 23 kickoffs for 625 yards and one touchdown and eight punts for 208 yards and one touchdown.

== Professional career ==
Pre-draft measurables
Height	Weight	Arm length	Hand span	40-yard dash	10-yard split	20-yard split	20-yard shuttle	Three-cone drill	Vertical jump	Broad jump	Bench press
5 ft 9 5/8 in (1.77 m)	197 lb (89 kg)	30 7/8 in (0.78 m)	8 5/8 in (0.22 m)	4.48 s	1.46 s	2.57 s	4.65 s	7.14 s	37.5 in (0.95 m)	10 ft 7 in (3.23 m)	11 reps
All values from Pro Day

=== Miami Dolphins ===
Cole was signed as an undrafted free agent by the Miami Dolphins on April 29, 2020. He was waived on September 5, 2020, during final roster cuts, and signed to the team's practice squad the next day. He was placed on the practice squad/COVID-19 list by the team on November 12, 2020, and restored to the practice squad on November 26.

=== San Francisco 49ers ===
Cole was signed to a two-year contract off of the Dolphins' practice squad by the San Francisco 49ers on December 24, 2020. Cole made his NFL debut in the 49ers' final game of the season, making two tackles on special teams in a 23–26 loss to the Seattle Seahawks. Cole was waived on May 4, 2021.

=== New York Jets ===
On May 5, 2021, Cole was claimed off waivers by the New York Jets. He was waived on August 6, 2021.

=== New York Giants ===
On August 8, 2021, Cole was claimed off waivers by the New York Giants. He was waived on August 31, 2021 and re-signed to the practice squad the next day. On September 28, 2021, he was released from the practice squad.

=== Carolina Panthers ===
On October 4, 2021, Cole was signed to the Carolina Panthers practice squad. He was released on December 7.

=== Seattle Seahawks ===
On December 14, 2021, Cole was signed to the Seattle Seahawks practice squad. He signed a reserve/future contract with the Seahawks on January 10, 2022. He was waived on May 13, 2022.

=== Washington Commanders ===
On August 8, 2022, Cole signed with the Washington Commanders. He was released on August 30.

=== Winnipeg Blue Bombers ===
On May 10, 2023, Cole signed with the Winnipeg Blue Bombers of the Canadian Football League (CFL).
