= Curie Metropolitan High School =

Location
- 4959 S. Archer Avenue; Chicago, Illinois 60632; United States; 41.8025°N 87.7213°W

Information
- School type: Public Secondary Magnet
- Motto: "We strive for Excellence!"
- School district: Chicago Public Schools
- CEEB code: 141016
- Principal: Homero Peñuelas
- Teaching staff: 199.50 (FTE)
- Grades: 9–12
- Gender: Coed
- Enrollment: 3,136 (2023-2024)
- Student to teacher ratio: 15.72
- Campus type: Urban
- Colors: Red; White; Blue
- Athletics conference: Chicago Public League
- Team name: Condors
- Accreditation: North Central Association of Colleges and Schools
- Yearbook: Odyssey
- Website: curiehs.org

Marie Sklodowska Curie Metropolitan High School is a public four-year magnet high school located in the Archer Heights neighborhood on the southwest side of Chicago, Illinois, United States. Curie is operated by Chicago Public Schools district. The school has a Technical, Performing Arts, and International Baccalaureate Programme.

Curie Metropolitan High School was named after Nobel Prize laureate Marie Sklodowska–Curie in recognition of the area's historically heavy Polish-American populace. Curie Metro High School is accessible via the Chicago L's nearby Pulaski Orange Line station.

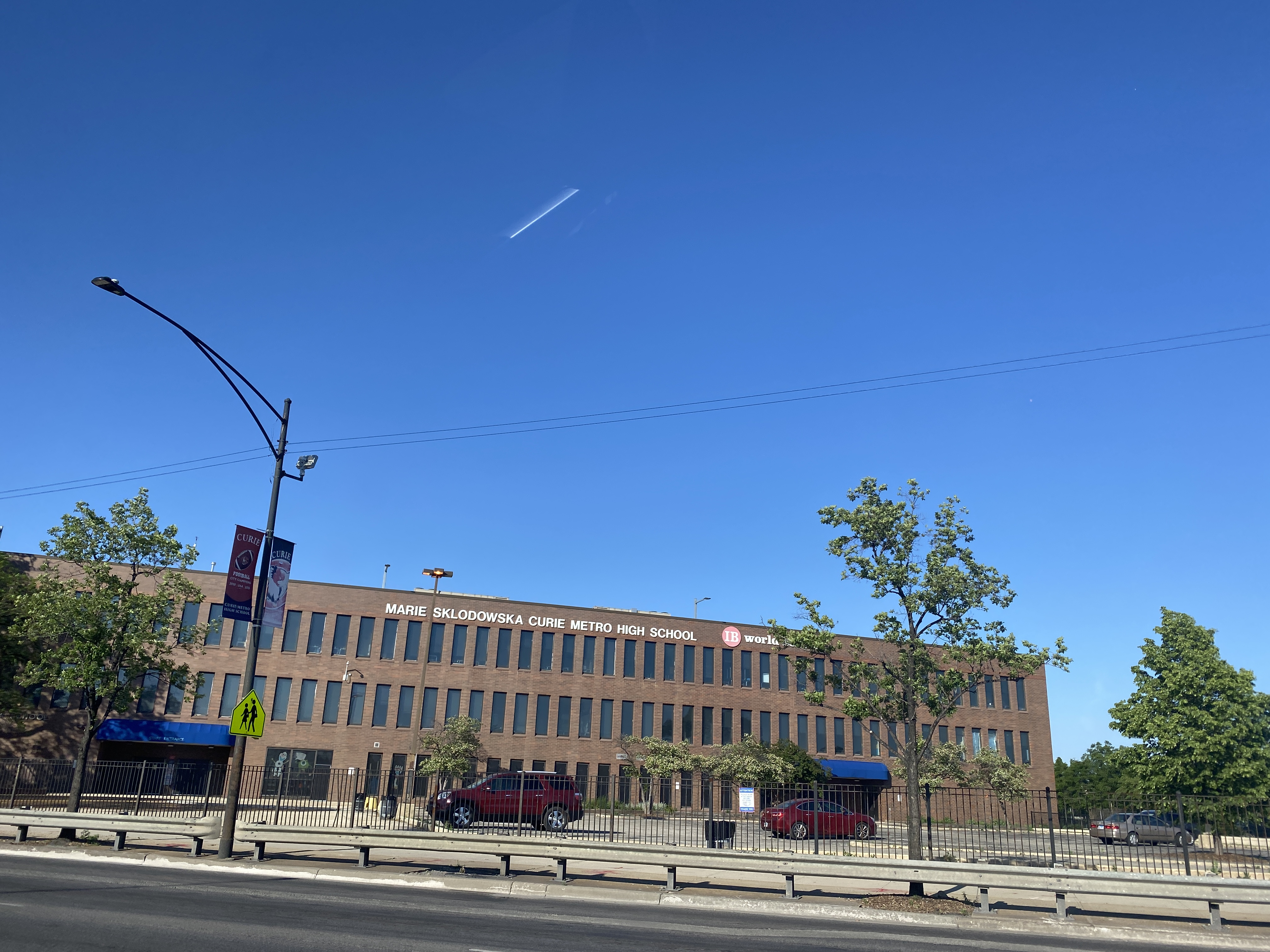
View of Curie High School from South Pulaski Ave.

== Academics ==
Curie Metropolitan High School has been an International Baccalaureate Organization World School since January 1999, and offers both the IB Middle Years Programme and the IB Diploma Programme. Curie Metro was one of sixteen schools nationwide selected by the College Board for inclusion in the EXCELerator School Improvement Model program beginning the 2007-2008 school year. The project was funded by the Bill & Melinda Gates Foundation. As of 2014 Curie Metropolitan High School has been on Chicago Public Schools academic probation for 5 years.

=== International Baccalaureate ===
Curie offers a rigorous International Baccalaureate (IB) Diploma Programme to help academically qualified students gain a valuable competitive edge for admission to college. Offered in grades 11 and 12, this comprehensive, two-year college preparatory curriculum helps students develop the critical thinking skills and knowledge needed to excel academically after graduation. At the end of grades 11 and 12, students sit for world-wide IB examinations. Based on their exam and other assessment scores, students may be awarded university credit for their IB course work at Curie. Each university has its own policy regarding credit awarded for IB scores. Students also take several AP courses during their four years at Curie.

== Demographics ==
In the 2022-2023 school year, there were 3,178 students enrolled at the school. In the same year, 87% of students identified as Hispanic or Latino, 10% were black or African-American, 2% were Asian, and 1% were non-Hispanic white. 85% of students are eligible for free or reduced price lunches. The school has a student to teacher ratio of 16.4.

== Athletics ==
Curie competes in the Chicago Public League (CPL) and is a member of the Illinois High School Association (IHSA). Curie High School is a school with a wide variety of sports. With twelve varsity sports, Curie students have a wide selection to choose from. The most notable sport recently is the varsity water polo team, which has won eight consecutive Chicago Public League titles in recent years. In 2015, the basketball team won its first class 4A Illinois State Championship. Curie recently won back-to-back CPS Championships in football and played in back-to-back Prep Bowls (City Champ vs. Catholic League champ). On February 17, 2019, the basketball team won its first Chicago Public Schools Tournament Championship.

== Notable alumni ==
- Victor Adeyanju (2001), former NFL defensive end for the St. Louis Rams
- Cliff Alexander (2014), former McDonald's All-American basketball player for the Kansas Jayhawks
- Matt Cole, former NFL player
- Justin Harmon (2019), college basketball player for the Illinois Fighting Illini
- Alfonzo McKinnie (2010 - transferred), former NBA player for the Chicago Bulls
- Dewayne Perkins, comedian and writer who appeared on Season 9 of MTV's Wild N' Out; one of Variety's 10 Comics to Watch for 2020
- Emanuel Rodriguez, professional wrestler under the ring names Samuray del Sol, Kalisto, and Octagón Jr.; former two-time WWE United States Champion & former WWE Cruiserweight Champion
- Christian J. Ward, rap artist known as Yung Berg (Sexy Lady)
- Mike Wengren, founding member and drummer for the metal band Disturbed
