= Kedzie station (CTA Orange Line) =

Chicago "L" station

Kedzie 3200W 4900S
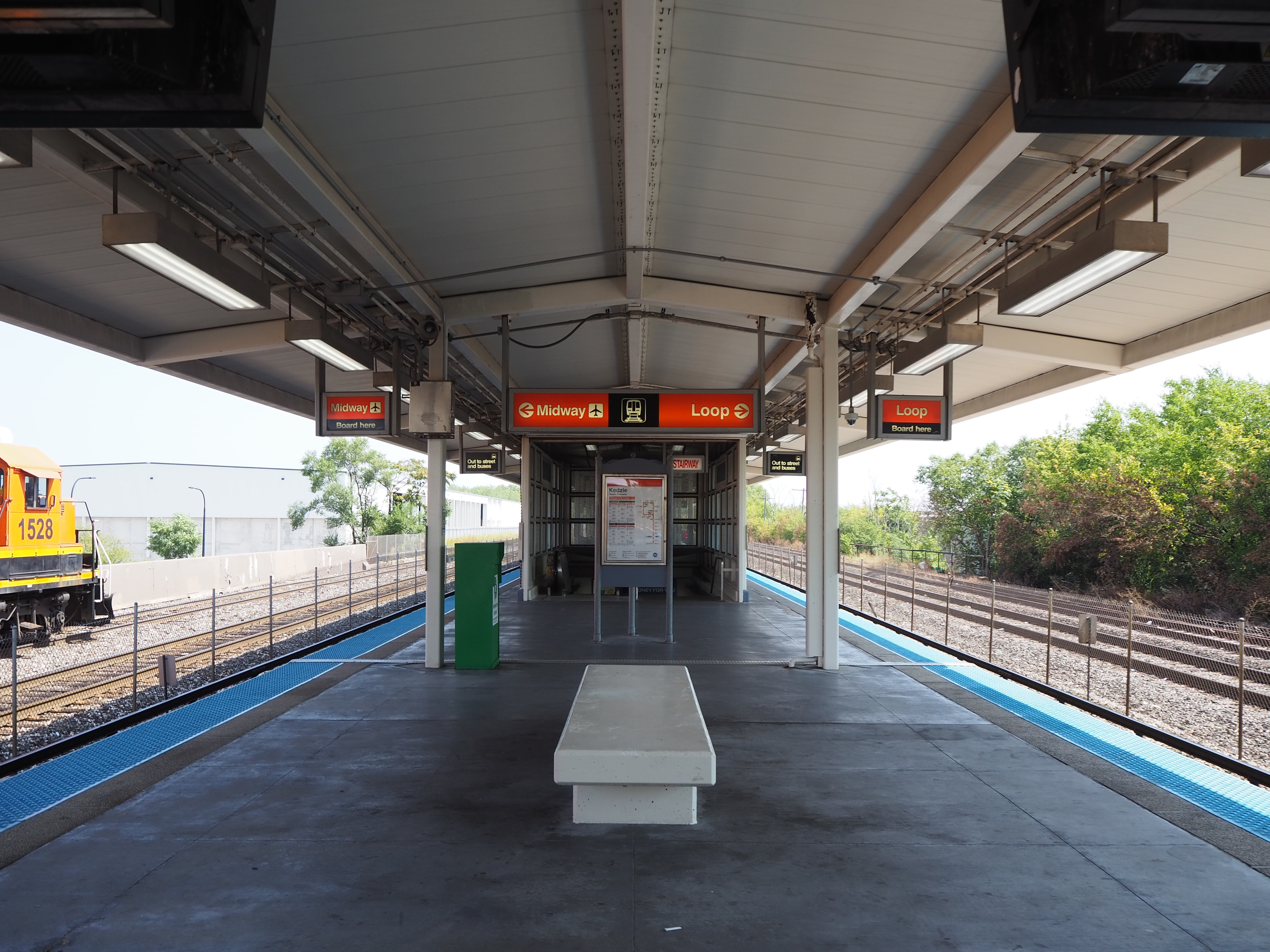

General information
- Location: 4900 South Kedzie Avenue; Chicago Illinois 60632
- Coordinates: 41.804236°N 87.704406°W
- Owner: Chicago Transit Authority
- Line: Midway Branch
- Platforms: 1 island platform
- Tracks: 2

Construction
- Structure type: Embankment
- Parking: 157 spaces
- Cycle facilities: Yes
- Accessible: Yes

History
- Opened: October 31, 1993; 32 years ago (formal opening); November 3, 1993; 32 years ago (full service)

Passengers
- 2025: 700,033 ▲2%

Services
Preceding station	Chicago "L"	Following station
Pulaski toward Midway	Orange Line	Western toward Loop (Library)
Former services
Preceding station	Grand Trunk Western Railroad	Following station
Elsdon toward Valparaiso	Suburban Service (Chicago)	Western Avenue toward Chicago
Track layout
Location

Kedzie is an 'L' station on the CTA's Orange Line. It is located between the neighborhoods of Brighton Park and Gage Park.

== Bus connections ==
CTA

- 47 47th
- 51 51st
- 52 Kedzie
- 52A South Kedzie
