= Cliff Alexander =

American basketball player (born 1995)

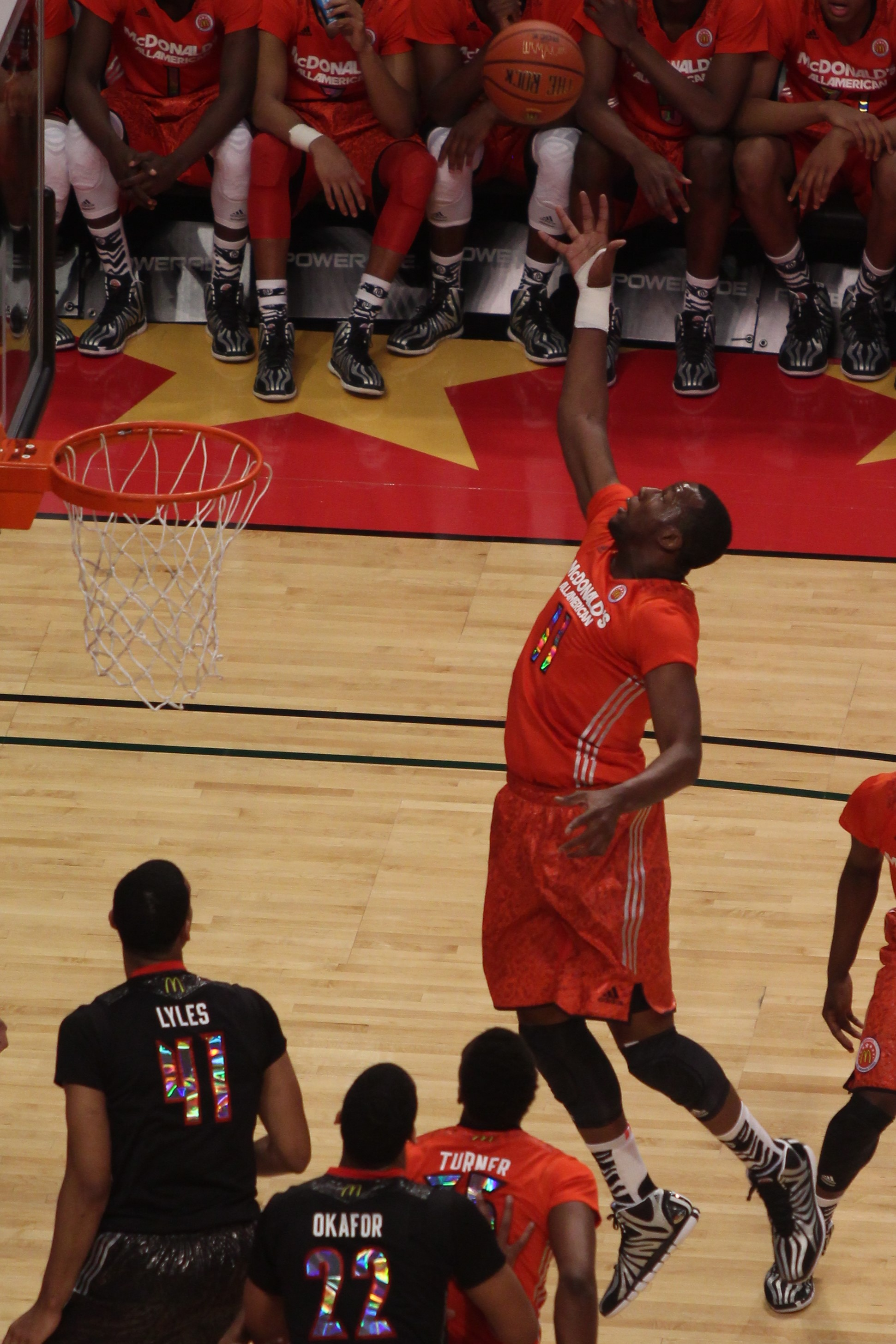
- Alexander in the 2014 McDonald's All-American Boys Game

No. 22 – Guaiqueries de Margarita
- Position: Center
- League: SPB

Personal information
- Born: November 16, 1995 (age 31) Chicago, Illinois, U.S.
- Listed height: 6 ft 9 in (2.06 m)
- Listed weight: 245 lb (111 kg)

Career information
- High school: Curie (Chicago, Illinois)
- College: Kansas (2014–2015)
- NBA draft: 2015: undrafted
- Playing career: 2015–present

Career history
- 2015–2016: Portland Trail Blazers
- 2016: →Santa Cruz Warriors
- 2016–2017: Erie BayHawks
- 2017: Long Island Nets
- 2017–2018: Wisconsin Herd
- 2018: ASVEL
- 2018–2019: Brose Bamberg
- 2019–2020: Le Mans Sarthe
- 2020–2021: Busan KT Sonicboom
- 2021–2022: Daegu KOGAS Pegasus
- 2022–2023: Sagesse Club
- 2023–2024: Beirut Club
- 2024: Guangxi Rhinos
- 2024: Al-Ahli
- 2024–2025: Anyang Jung Kwan Jang Red Boosters
- 2025–present: Guaiqueríes de Margarita

Career highlights
- Mr. Basketball USA (2014); Naismith Prep Player of the Year (2014); McDonald's All-American (2014); First-team Parade All-American (2014)
- Stats at NBA.com
- Stats at Basketball Reference
Medals
Men's 3x3 basketball
Representing the United States
FIBA Americas U18 3x3 Championship
Gold medal – first place	2013 United States	National team

Cliffton Nirgel Alexander (born November 16, 1995) is an American professional basketball player for the Guaiqueríes de Margarita of the Superliga Profesional de Baloncesto (SPB). He completed his freshman season at the University of Kansas for the Jayhawks' on their 2014–15 team. He declared himself eligible for the 2015 NBA draft but was undrafted. He played one season for the Portland Trail Blazers and earned a second year of NBA service with the Brooklyn Nets.

He played in high school at Curie High School in Chicago where he won Naismith and Mr. Basketball USA recognition as national player of the year. He did not play organized basketball until eighth grade, but by late in his freshman season he became a notable contributor to his high school's varsity team. He was ranked among the top 20 prospects in the national class of 2014 prior to his sophomore season. As a junior, he moved into the top 10 of the national class and was recognized as an All-American. By the beginning of his senior season, he was considered to be a top 5 player by most talent evaluators and his stock was still on the rise. Following a Martin Luther King Day performance during his senior year against the number one team in the country, many experts considered him to be the best player in the national class of 2014.

In 2013, he represented USA Basketball in international play. Several talent scouts praised his powerful game. As a high schooler, Alexander felt he was most often compared to Amar'e Stoudemire. He was also contrasted with crosstown rival Jahlil Okafor, especially as a senior when they vied for national attention. Alexander was heavily recruited by many top Division I basketball programs and his recruitment was widely followed. He played in the 2014 McDonald's All-American Boys Game, 2014 Jordan Brand Classic and the 2014 Nike Hoop Summit, earning co-MVP of the Jordan Brand Classic. Alexander led Curie to the 2014 Chicago Public High School League city championship in a quadruple-overtime game against Okafor that was the lead story on SportsCenter. The championship was later forfeited. As a freshman with Kansas, he did not play in the latter part of the season after the National Collegiate Athletic Association (NCAA) launched an investigation into his eligibility.

== High school career ==
=== Freshman season ===
Alexander, who was also a highly regarded football player, did not play organized basketball until eighth grade. Alexander played on Curie's 2010–11 varsity team as a freshman, but had little impact at first and sat out some games in December. He missed the first ten games due to a heart murmur. In late December, he started getting local attention as part of the reason Curie remained undefeated. During the Chicago Public High School League (CPL) and Illinois High School Association (IHSA) playoffs, he contributed significant performances. On March 9, 2011, Curie was eliminated from the IHSA playoffs in a Class 4A sectional semifinal by Lyons Township High School as freshman Alexander posted 9 points, 13 rebounds, and 2 blocks in a 66–64 loss. His late-season contributions gave Curie an added dimension, as the team finished with a 28–3 record. Following his freshman season, Alexander began to be recognized by local evaluators as a potential top national recruit. After Jabari Parker and Jahlil Okafor, Alexander was already considered the best Chicago area basketball prospect. He earned Red-Central all-conference recognition.

=== Sophomore season ===
As late as August 2011, Alexander remained unrecognized by most national evaluators. However, as Alexander entered his sophomore season, he was one of three area prospects that were firmly among the national class of 2014's top 25 prospects (along with Whitney M. Young Magnet High School teammates Okafor and Paul White). As of September 1, 2011, Alexander was ranked 13 by ESPN.com and 9 by Rivals.com. On December 30 in the Pontiac Holiday Tournament, Parker's Simeon Career Academy defeated Alexander's Curie 44–27 as Alexander was almost shut out by Simeon's Steve Taylor. On January 22, 2013, Okafor and Alexander went head to head in CPL play. Curie defeated Young by a 57–46 margin as Alexander had 10 points, six rebounds and three blocks before having a personal foul disqualification. Despite fouling out, Alexander had the better game with nearly a dozen Division I programs in attendance. Curie had a rematch against Simeon in the February 17 CPL championship game with Alexander again being ineffective on offense with four points against Parker and Taylor as Curie lost 53–49. The game broadcast on ESPN3. Following the season, a statewide panel of sportswriters and broadcaster voted Alexander as an Associated Press boys basketball Class 4A all-state honorable mention honoree.

=== Junior season ===
Curie High School vs. Whitney Young High School at the Argo High School on March 7, 2013, in the Illinois High School Association playoffs
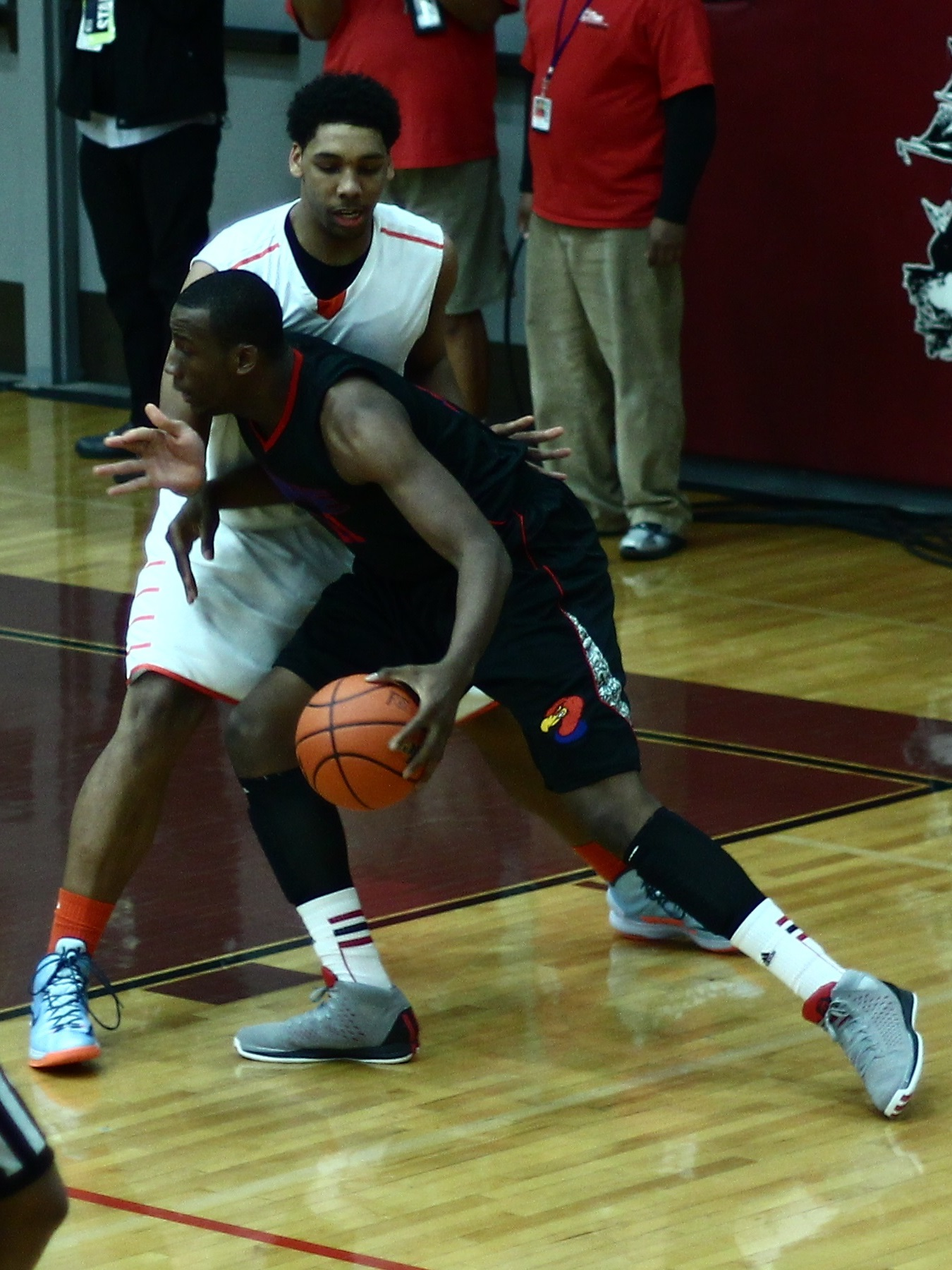
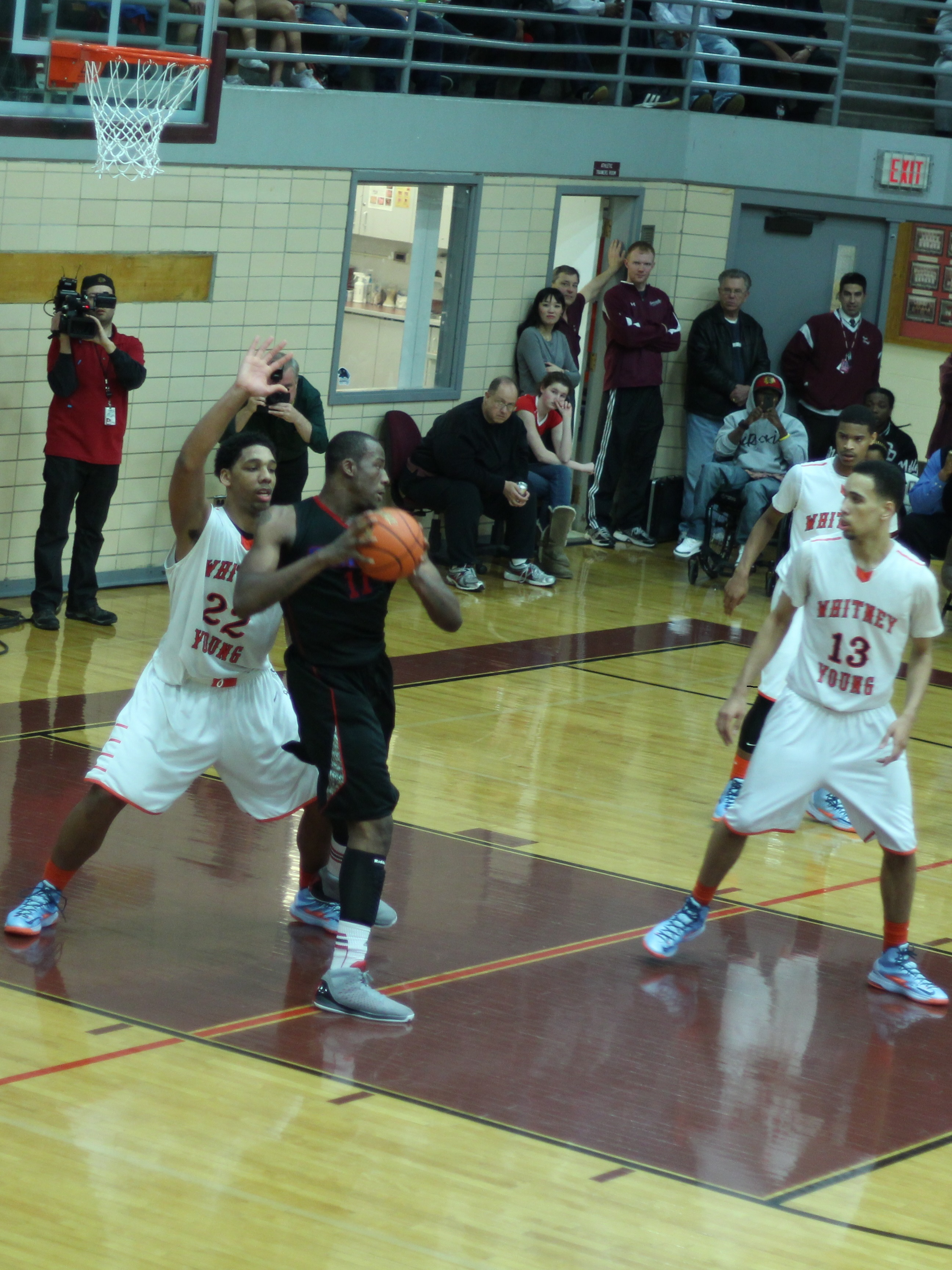
Alexander posting up against Jahlil Okafor

At the June 2012 Pangos All-American Camp, Alexander was selected as the Most Outstanding Player. Alexander, who was already a top 5 recruit according to some sources, endured a Summer 2012 foot injury that sidelined him. By mid-July 2012, as ESPN's number 10 ranked prospect, he received an offer from Kentucky and was being recruited by DePaul, Indiana, Ohio State and Wisconsin. Upon receiving his offer from Kentucky, he told Rivals.com that his two leading schools were Kentucky and Michigan State.

By the fall of his junior season, the Illinois class of 2014 was being mentioned as one of the all-time great statewide classes of basketball players. Chicago Sun-Times writer Joe Henricksen noted that there was a high chance that this would be the fifth Illinois class and first since 2002 to include three McDonald's All-Americans. He also noted that the class has a chance to rival if not surpass the classes of 1998 and 2011 which each had nine top 100 players.

On November 30, at a Draffenville, Kentucky tournament game against Oak Hill Academy, Alexander scored 26 of his team's 39 points on 12–14 field goal shooting in a 72–39 defeat. On December 29, Curie again faced Parker and Simeon in the Pontiac Holiday Tournament (this time in the semifinals). Alexander posted 21 points on 9–10 field goal shooting, but Simeon still prevailed 62–57. Notably, Parker assumed Alexander as a defensive assignment after Alexander gave Curie a 48–47 lead with 4:58 time remaining and Alexander went scoreless the rest of the game. Despite 11 points, 9 rebounds and 8 blocked shots from Alexander, Curie was eliminated from the CPL playoffs in a February 11 quarterfinals 60–58 loss to the Billy Garrett, Jr.-led Morgan Park High School that went on to become 2013 IHSA Class 3A state champion. On February 26, the Associated Press Illinois Class 4A basketball rankings showed Whitney Young at number 1, and it was also expected that Young's road to the sectional finals would include a March 6 meeting with Curie. According to Henricksen, the March 6 state playoff meeting between Young and Curie was anticipated because it would pit Okafor against Alexander, making it the most highly touted IHSA playoff matchup of centers since 1988 when LaPhonso Ellis led East Saint Louis' Lincoln High School against Eric Anderson's St. Francis de Sales High School. Mike Helfgot of the Chicago Tribune said that there have not been many matchups between big men this good with so much at stake. On March 2, Alexander attended Senior night at University of Illinois at Urbana–Champaign's Assembly Hall. The February 2013 Great Plains blizzard caused controversial postponements of several IHSA games including the March 6 Young-Curie game, which was delayed one day. Young defeated Curie 62–58 as the supporting cast made up for Alexander's 14–13 scoring edge over Okafor.

Curie High School vs. Whitney Young High School at the Argo High School on March 7, 2013, in the Illinois High School Association playoffs

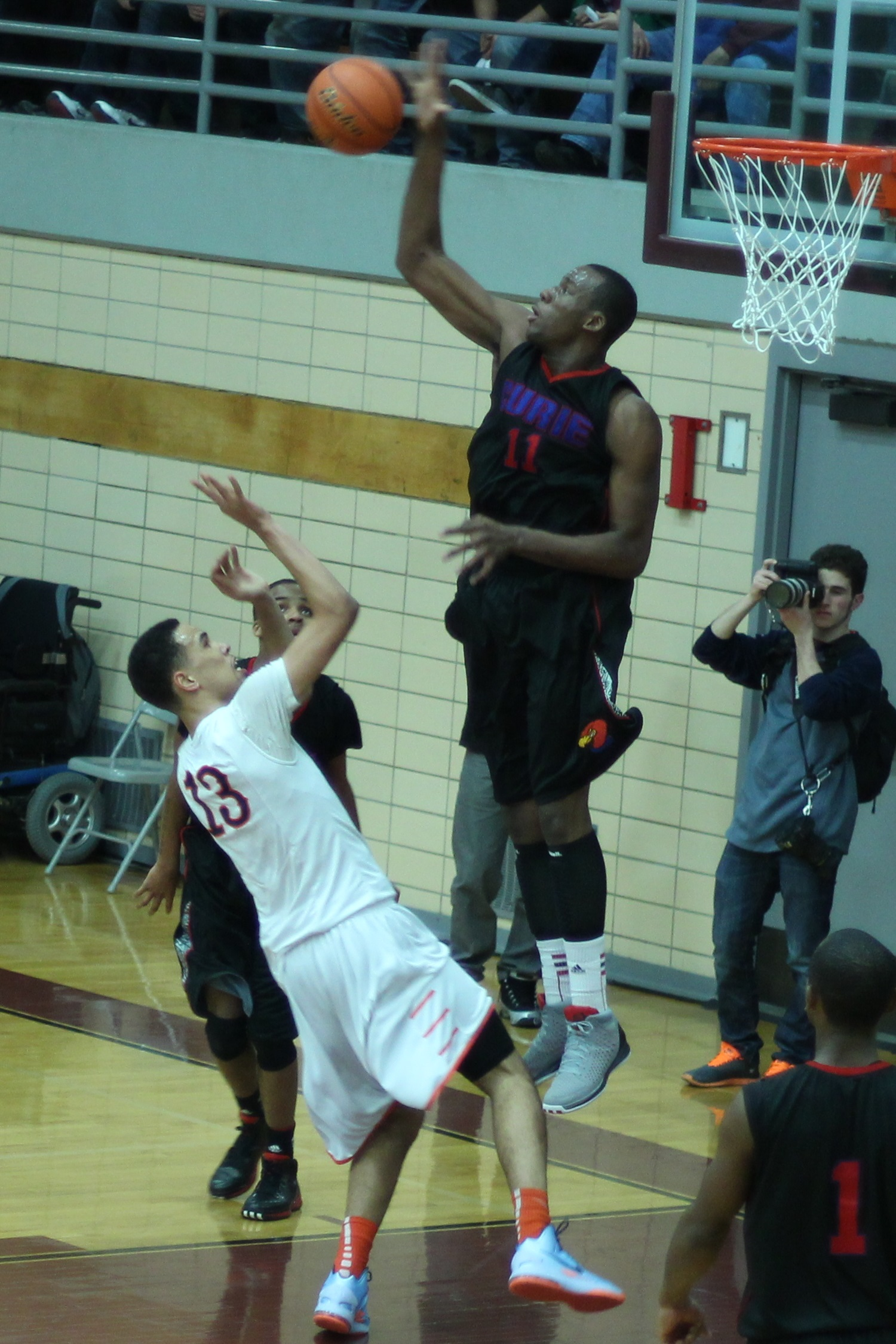
Alexander blocking Paul White

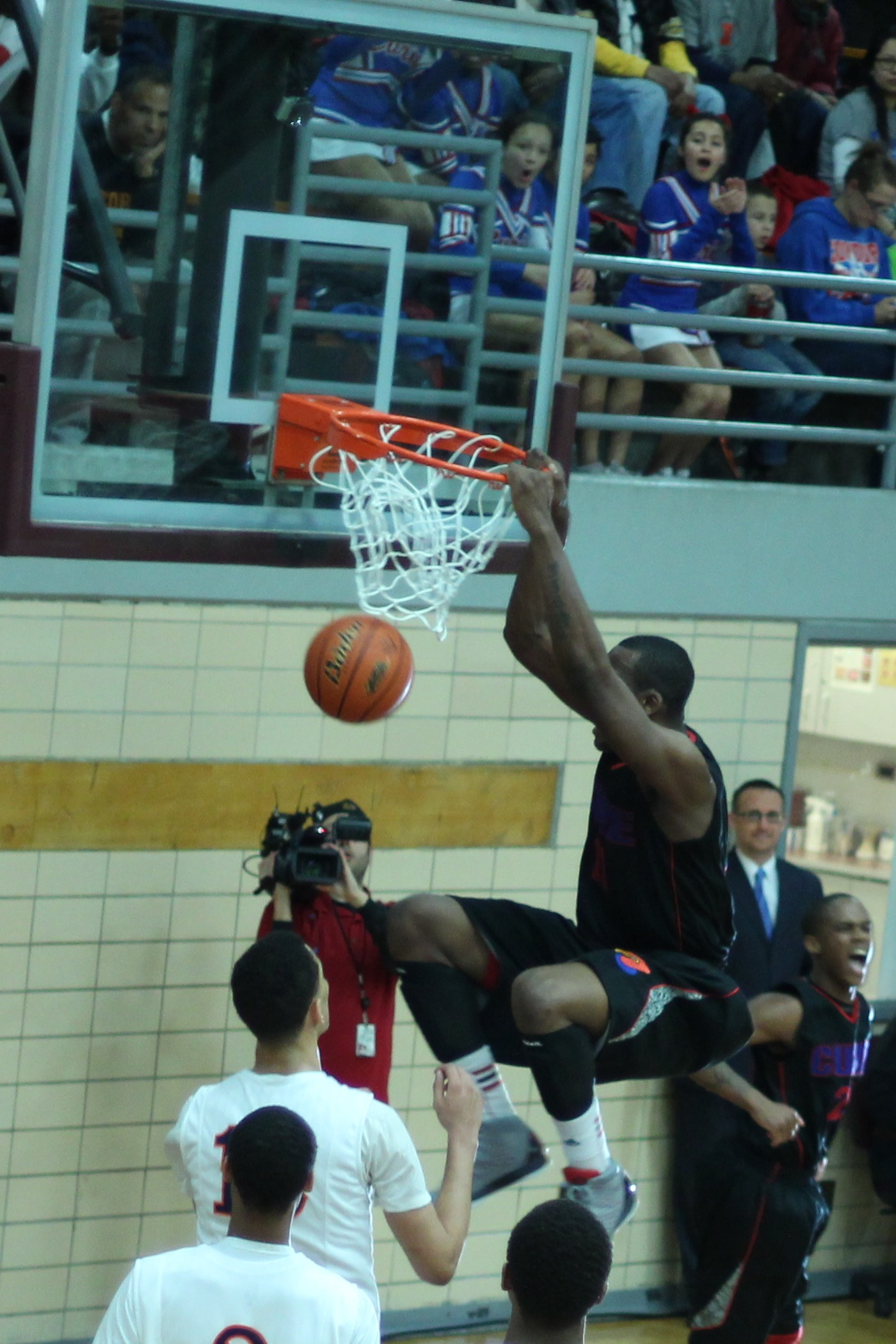
Alexander dunking

In late April 2013, Okafor's father believed it was very possible that Okafor and Tyus Jones would matriculate together as a package. By late April 2013, there were rumors that Alexander and Justise Winslow would attend whatever school Jones and Okafor attended. Although Alexander was ranked as the fifth best player in the class of 2014 by Rivals.com and had offers from four of the six schools common to Jones and Okafor by the beginning of June, he said the chances of him matriculating with Jones and Okafor was slim.

Alexander was recognized as a 2013 All-CPL first team selection by the Chicago Sun-Times along with Parker, Okafor, Kendrick Nunn and Garrett. Alexander was recognized as an Associated Press All-State Class 4A first team selection along with Parker, Okafor, Malcolm Hill and Sterling Brown. The Chicago Tribune named him to its All-State first team along with Parker, Okafor, Jalen Brunson and Tyler Ulis. Alexander was one of five underclassmen selected by HighSchoolHardwood.com as an All-American, along with Okafor, Jones and Stanley Johnson (all first team) and Joel Berry (second team along with Alexander).

=== Senior season ===
==== Summer and preseason ====
Alexander has become a member of the Mac Irvin Fire AAU team along with Okafor. During the Nike-backed Pro-Am summer basketball Chi-League Alexander, Okafor and Parker were on the same team. He showed potential that LeBron James himself noticed at the July LeBron James Skills Academy. He also stood out at the July Under Armour Summa Jam, where his Mac Irvin Fire opposed teams led by Myles Turner and Karl-Anthony Towns. On September 4, 2013, Rivals.com updated their ranking with Alexander maintaining his number 4 ranking. At the time, Eric Bossi of Rivals described Alexander as " perhaps the most powerful player in the high school ranks".

In September, Alexander believed that he would make his final selection with a December verbal commitment and an April signing of his National Letter of Intent. On October 7, the Hoophall Classic schedule was announced and Curie was scheduled to play Montverde Academy on January 20. By some accounts Kansas was a favorite because his girlfriend was a student at Kansas and the 2013–14 Kansas Jayhawks were scheduled to play the 2013–14 Duke Blue Devils at Chicago's United Center in the ESPN Champions Classic on November 12 just before his scheduled announcement. In 2013 Caelynn Manning-Allen became a freshman on the Kansas women's basketball team. However, Illinois was very excited to be in serious contention for Alexander. It was the first time since Derrick Rose in 2006 that a top 5 prospect was still considering Illinois so late into his senior year and Alexander's level of interest seemed much higher than Rose's. Following his Illinois visit, his scheduled announcement date had moved forward to November 15. On October 31, Alexander officially eliminated Michigan State from his candidate list, leaving Kansas, Illinois, DePaul and Memphis in contention.

On November 7 Alexander was ranked second behind points leader Emmanuel Mudiay in the Mr. Basketball USA preseason tracker. Although he had only one first place vote on the ten ballots, he was ranked ahead of Okafor and Stanley Johnson who combined for seven first place votes. Alexander and Mudiay were the only players named on 9 of the 10 ballots. The preseason points leader has gone on to win the award in four of the prior five years. His November 15 verbal commitment announcement was scheduled on the same date as Okafor, Jones and Stanley Johnson. According to ESPN, all four were among the top 10 in the national class (Okafor #1, Alexander #3, Jones #4 and Johnson #9). On the eve of his announcement, Kansas and Illinois were the favorites for his services. He made his verbal commitment on ESPNU to Kansas basketball on November 15. He was flanked by his father (Clifton Terry) and mother (Latillia Alexander). Prior to his senior season, USA Today named him to its 10-man preseason All-USA team along with Stanley Johnson, Jones, Trey Lyles, Emmanuel Mudiay, Malik Newman, Okafor, Oubre, D'Angelo Russell, and Turner. Alexander was joined on the Chicago Tribune's preseason Illinois Mr. Basketball top 5 by Okafor, Brunson, Ulis and Keita Bates-Diop.

==== 2013–14 regular season ====
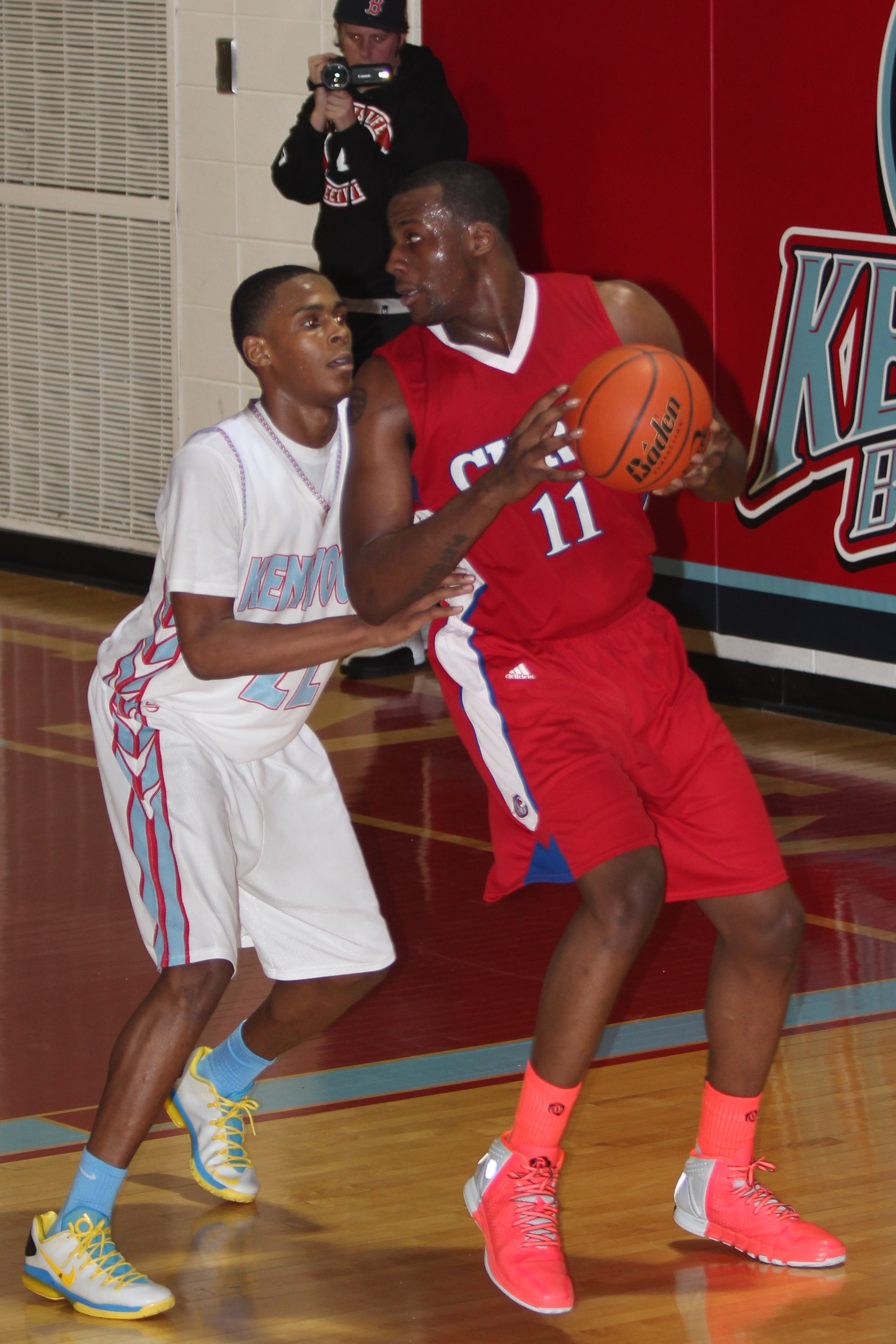
Alexander at Kenwood Academy

Alexander posted 22 points, 20 rebounds, and 5 blocks in a December 7, 66–62 victory at UIC Pavilion against USA Today's Super 25 number 11 ranked Bishop Gorman High School and its highly touted Stephen Zimmerman. Alexander almost had to serve a one-game suspension from the game due to having been assessed two technical fouls on December 1 against St. Rita High School. Alexander had an impressive start to his season. On December 12, he posted a triple double against Dunbar High School with 30 points, 24 rebounds, and 15 blocked shots. That week (December 9–17), he earned the Midwest player of the week from StudentSports.com. As a senior, he finally led Curie past three-time defending tournament champion and four-time defending Class 4A state champion Simeon to win the Pontiac Holiday Tournament with 16 points, 16 rebounds, and 6 blocks, earning tournament MVP honors. Even as a top 5 selection, Alexander's stock continued to rise as a senior, according to the Chicago Sun-Times' Joe Henricksen. Some of the stats that Alexander posted were so impressive as to cause disbelief to some, including Chicago Tribune high school basketball writer Mike Helfgot and several of his associates. In early January, Alexander continued to be a leading contender for national player of the year, holding on to second place in the Mr. Basketball USA race. On January 10, Alexander led Curie past Villa Angela-St. Joseph High School, which featured Rivals.com Class of 2015 number 10 ranked Carlton Bragg. In the January 20 Hoophall Classic, Alexander led Curie to a victory over D'Angelo Russell, Ben Simmons and Montverde Academy, the number one rated team in the country. Curie trailed by 9 points entering the fourth quarter, but Alexander had 13 of his 30 points in the final 4 minutes and 30 seconds to key the comeback. Alexander also had 12 rebounds and 5 blocks. Following the game, several writers, including CBS Sports college basketball writer Jeff Borzello said that Alexander has a valid case to present in terms of being the best high school basketball player in the country (along with Okafor, Turner and Mudiay). High school basketball writer Ronnie Flores regards the performance as one of the top 5 performances against a nationally highly rated high school basketball team since the turn of the century, ranking it with Louis Williams (2005), Kevin Durant (2006), Kevin Love (2007) and LeBron James (2001). The win bolted Curie to the number one ranking in the nation according to StudentSports.com. Alexander's performance moved him to the top of the rankings in the Mr. Basketball USA midseason tracker. He was ranked first by a wide margin and held the number one position on 7 out of 10 ballots.

==== 2014 postseason ====
Curie High School vs. Whitney Young High School in the quadruple overtime Chicago Public High School League championship game at the Jones Convocation Center on February 21, 2014
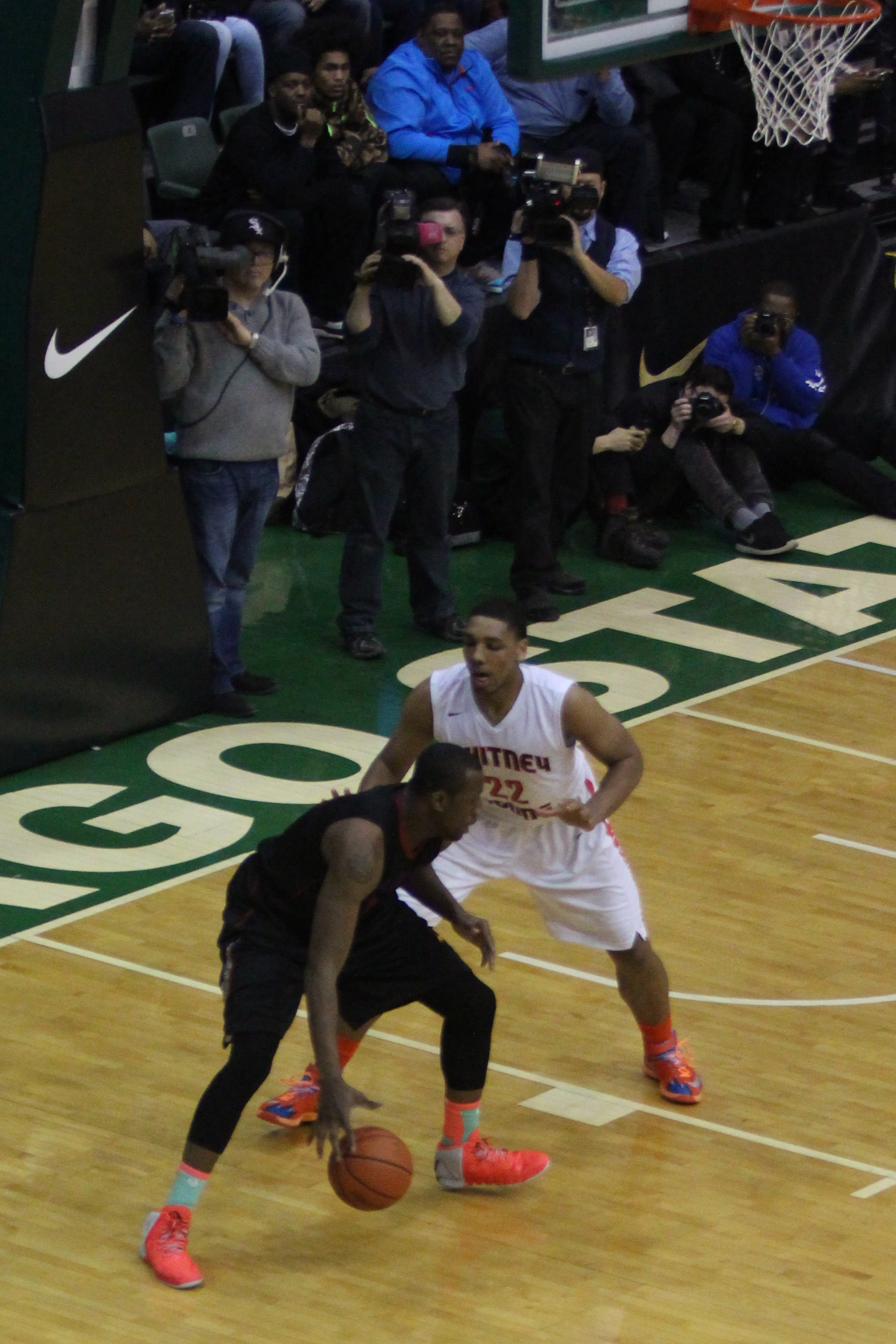
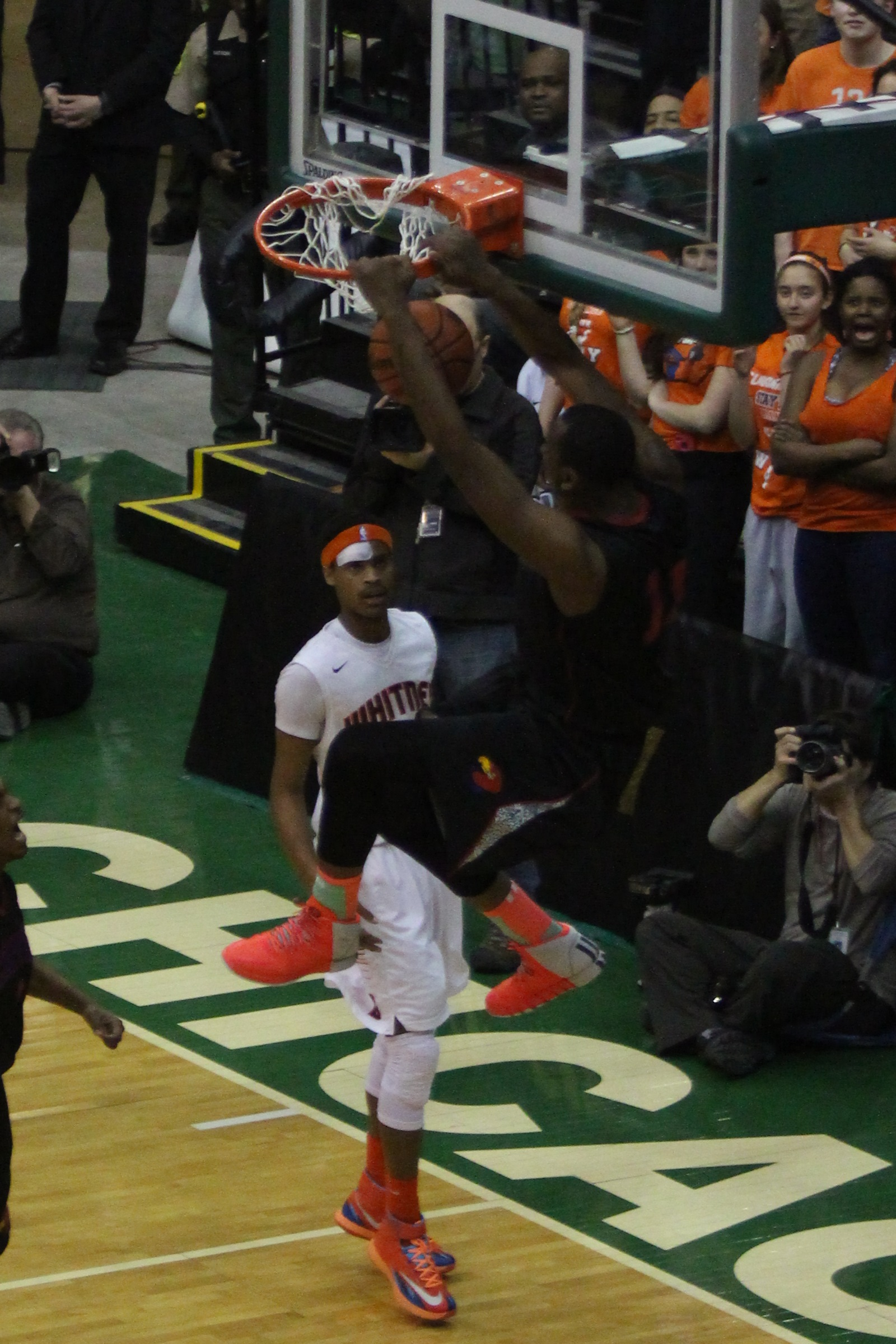
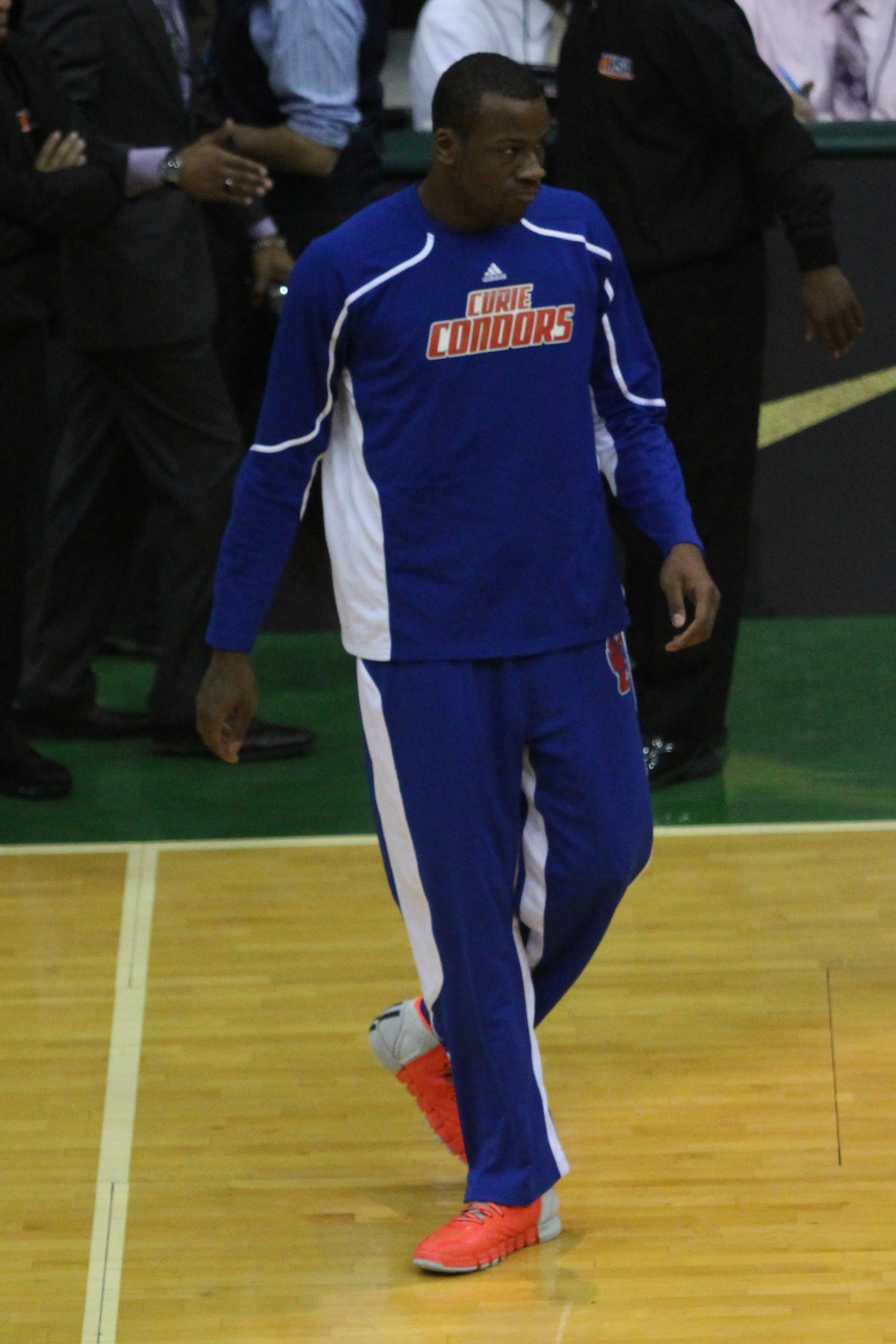
Alexander against Jahlil Okafor (left); Alexander against Miles Reynolds (middle); Pregame (right)

As the CPL playoffs began on February 5, a February 21 championship game clash between Okafor and Alexander was pondered in the local press after the 32-team brackets were announced. The CPL playoffs began with victories over Perspectives Charter by 71–37 and North Lawndale Charter High School 75–63. Against North Lawndale, Alexander had 27 points, 15 rebounds and 5 blocks. On February 16, Curie defeated Simeon 71–64. Alexander had 16 points, 12 rebounds, and 6 blocks earning a February 19 CPL semifinals rematch against Hyde Park Academy High School who they have already beaten twice this season. Alexander and Curie won 58–56 to reach the anticipated city championship matchup with Young and Okafor at the Jones Convocation Center. Alexander had a triple double with 10 points, 10 rebounds and 10 blocks. The matchup was the most anticipated city championship game since at least 1998 when fellow McDonald's All-Americans Quentin Richardson of Young and Corey Maggette of Fenwick High School were both top 15 players. On February 20, Alexander improved his first place total in the Mr. Basketball USA Tracker, holding eight first place and two second place votes. Curie won the city championship 69–66 in quadruple overtime as Alexander had 20 points, 14 rebounds and 4 blocks according to Chicago Tribune and Comcast SportsNet, while the Chicago Sun-Times and Sports Illustrated credited him with just 12 rebounds. This came against Okafor who had 16 points and 9, 8 or 4 rebounds before fouling out with 2:13 remaining in regulation depending on which of the three sources you believe. The CPL Championship game was attended by Mayor of Chicago Rahm Emanuel and was the lead story on the late edition of SportsCenter. Seven days later, Curie was forced to forfeit all of its wins and the CPL championship due to the academic ineligibility of seven of its players. The title will remain vacant.

Alexander in the 2014 McDonald's All-American Boys Game
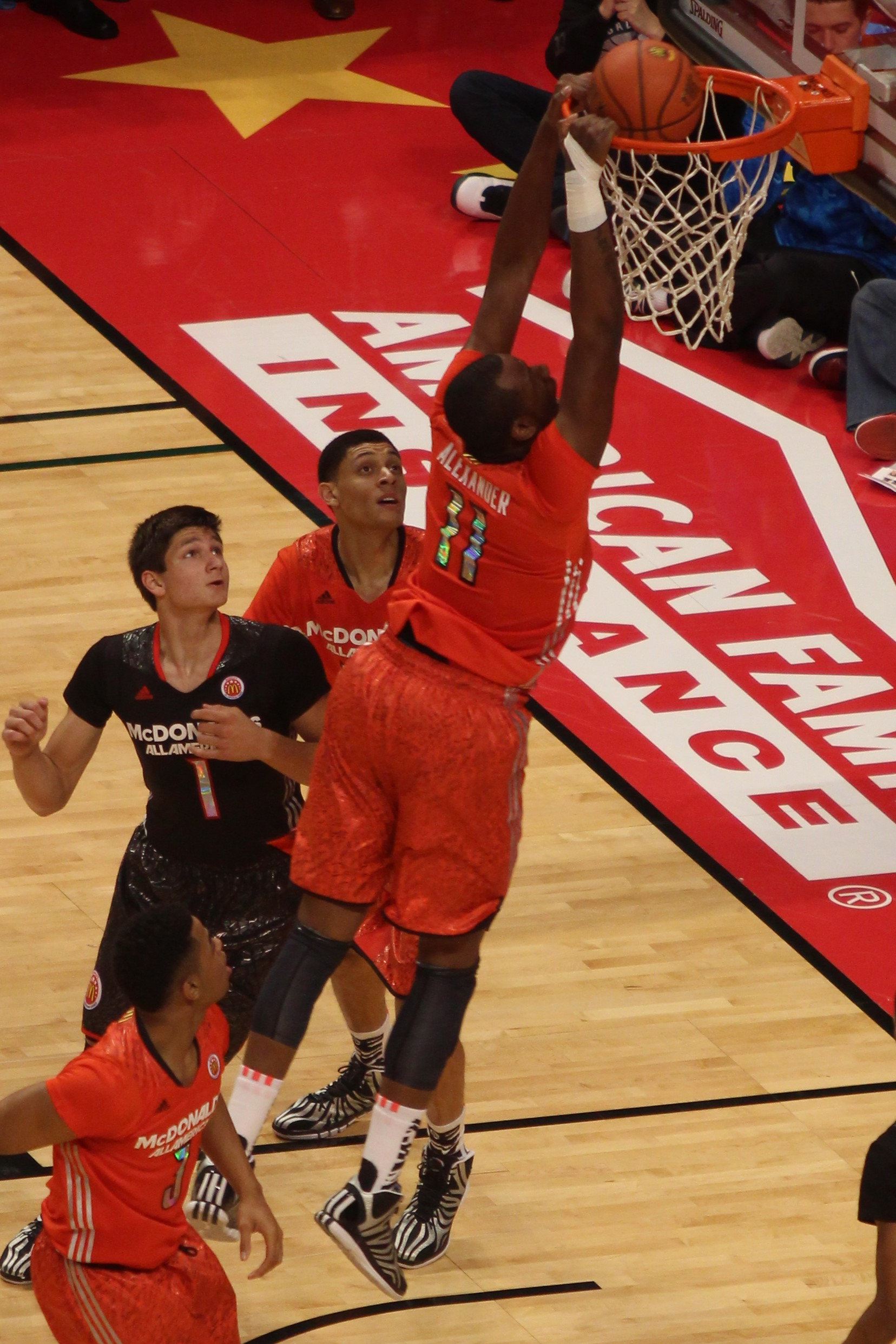
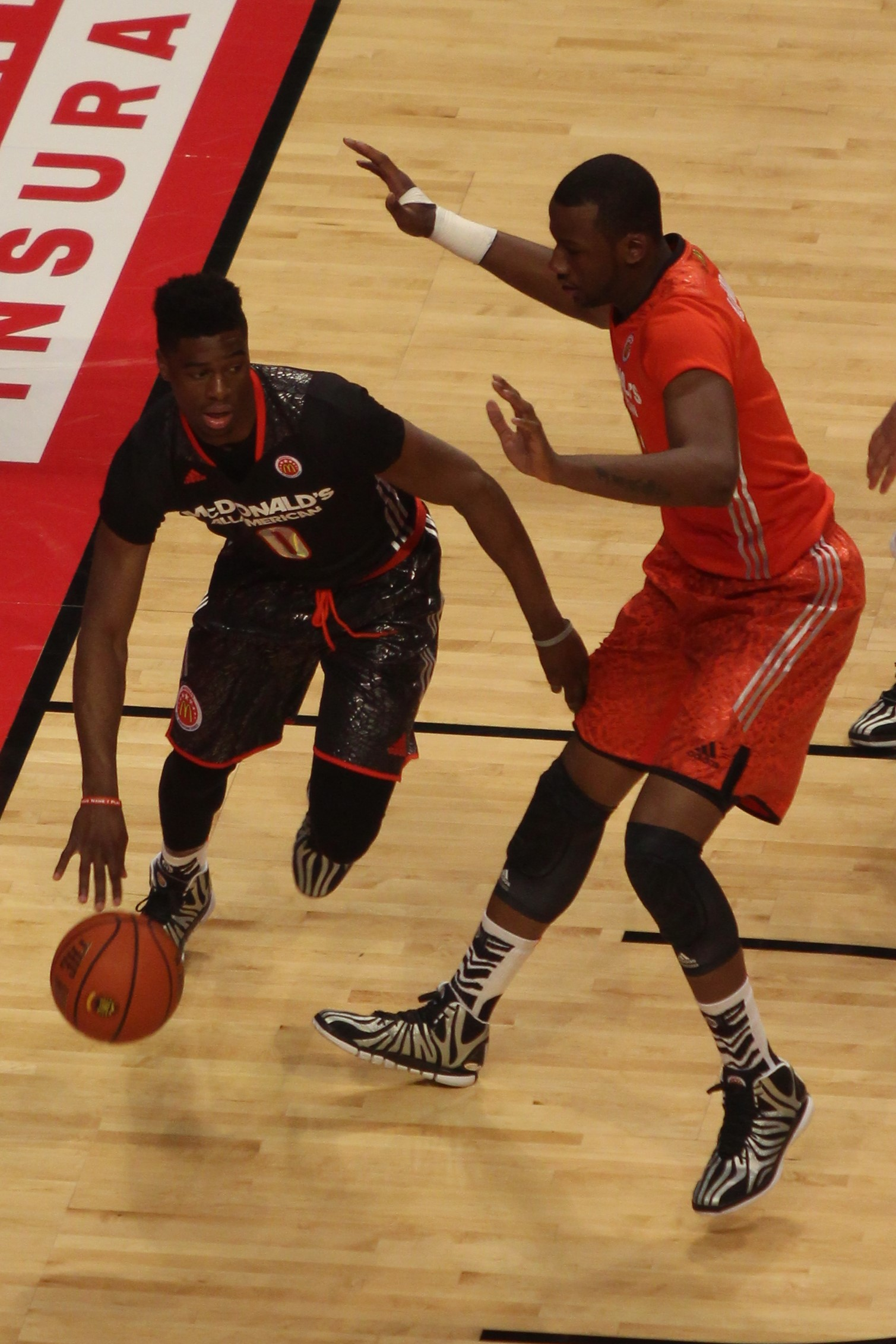

Okafor and Alexander vied for a host of local and national player of the year awards, with each winning multiple national player of the year awards. Young and Curie were both in the Marist Class 4A sectional in the 2014 IHSA playoffs and could have met again in the round of sixteen on March 14 if they had both won three regional contests. Despite forfeiting all wins in CPL games, Curie remained eligible to compete in the IHSA playoffs due to differences in eligibility rules. On March 4, Curie lost their opening IHSA playoff game to 11–11 DuSable High School by an 88–85 margin in overtime. It marked Curies first loss of the season on the court with Alexander in the lineup. Alexander posted 25 points, 15 rebounds, and 8 blocks despite fouling out in the final minute of regulation time. Curie trailed 13–2 early and led 47–32 midway through the third quarter. Curie starters Josh and Joseph Stamps were ineligible for IHSA play as was Malik Washington.

In the April 2, 2014, McDonald's All-American Game Alexander posted 9 points and a game-high (tied with Kevon Looney) 11 rebounds for the losing east team. In the April 18 Jordan Brand Classic, he was co-MVP (with Okafor). In the game, he posted 23 points, 8 rebounds and 5 blocks.

==== Awards and honors ====
Alexander was selected to the 10-man Team USA for the 17th annual Nike Hoop Summit on April 12, 2014, at the Moda Center. He was selected along with fellow Chicagoan Okafor and fellow Kansas commit Oubre. He was also selected to the 24-player 37th annual April 2, 2014 McDonald's All-American Boys Game at the United Center. He was joined as a McDonald's All-American by fellow Chicagoans Ulis and Okafor as well as Oubre. He was recognized as first team All-City along with Young teammates White and Okafor as well as Louis Adams, Jr. of Orr High School, and Luwane Pipkins of Bogan High School by the Chicago Sun-Times. On February 18, he became one of three finalists for the Naismith Prep Player of the Year Award along with Okafor and Stanley Johnson. On March 7 Alexander won the Chicago Sun-Times Player of the Year as well as the Naismith Player of the Year. On March 10, he was one of 26 players selected for the April 18, 2014, Jordan Brand Classic again along with fellow Chicagoans Ulis and Okafor as well as fellow Kansas commit Oubre. He was recognized as one of twenty Parade All-Americans. He was named Associated Press Class 4A 1st team All-state with Okafor, Brunson, Ulis and Sean O'Mara. Alexander lost out to Okafor in the Illinois Mr. Basketball voting by a 492–402 vote. He was a USA Today first team All-USA Boys Basketball Team selection along with Okafor, Oubre, Mudiay, and Stanley Johnson. He earned first team All-American recognition from MaxPreps on April 13. On April 16, he earned another national player of the year award Mr. Basketball USA.

College recruiting
Name	Hometown	School	Height	Weight	Commit date
Cliff Alexander; C/PF	Chicago, IL	Curie (IL)	6 ft 8.5 in (2.04 m)	240 lb (110 kg)	Nov 15, 2013
Cliff Alexander; C/PF	Recruit ratings: Scout: Rivals: 247Sports: ESPN:				
Overall recruit ranking: Scout: 6, 4 (C) Rivals: 4, 1 (PF) ESPN: 3, 2 (IL), 1 (PF)
Note: In many cases, Scout, Rivals, 247Sports, On3, and ESPN may conflict in their listings of height and weight.; In these cases, the average was taken. ESPN grades are on a 100-point scale.; Sources: "Kansas 2014 Basketball Commitments". Rivals.; "2014 Kansas Basketball Commits". Scout.; "ESPN". ESPN.; "Scout.com Team Recruiting Rankings". Scout.; "2014 Team Ranking". Rivals.

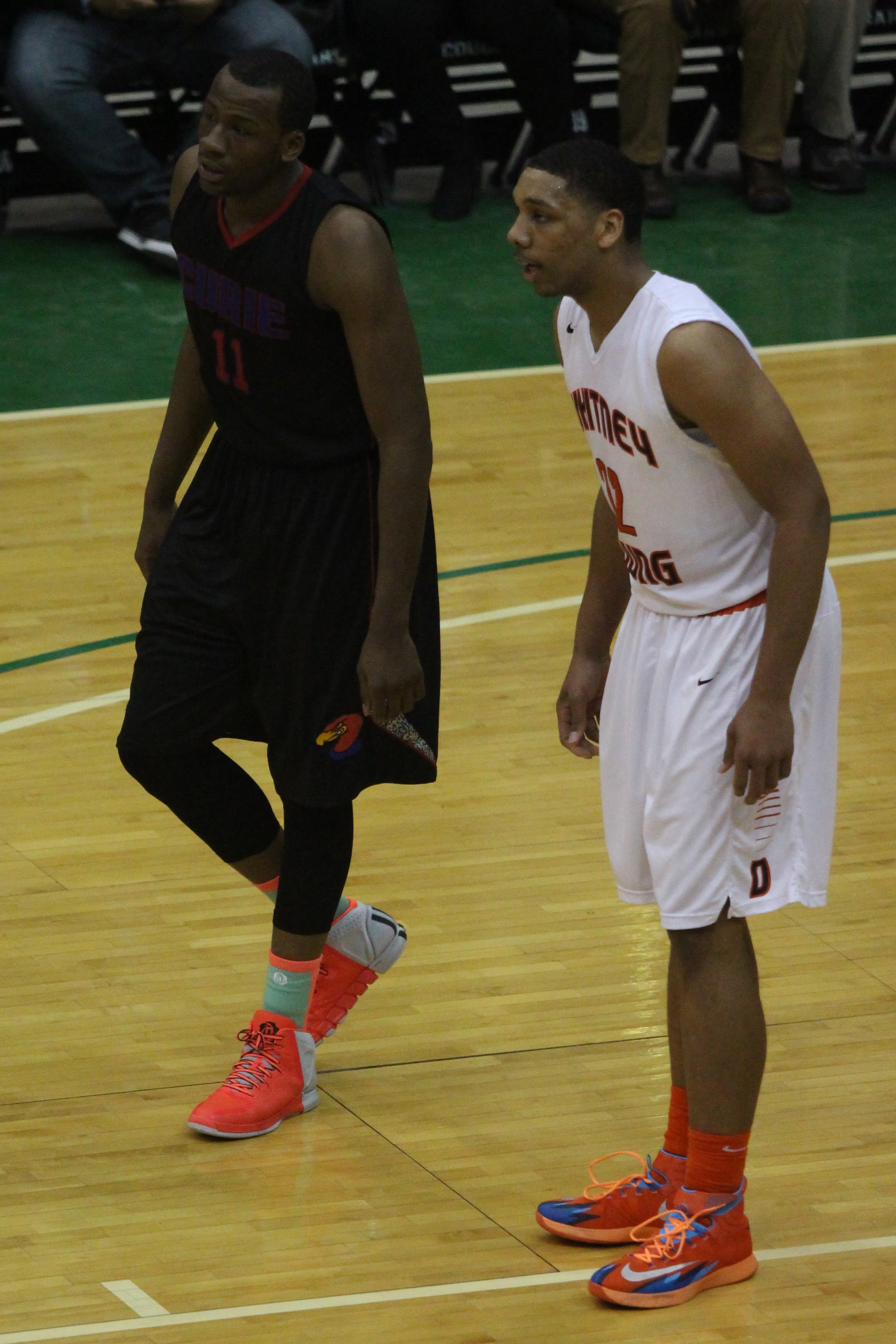
In high school, Alexander (left) was contrasted with crosstown rival Jahlil Okafor (right).

== College career ==
After a controversial college choice ceremony, where he put on two hats and then finished with a Kansas hat, with his father celebrating the bag, Alexander entered his college career as the Big 12 Conference Preseason Co-Freshmen of the Year (along with Myles Turner) according to a vote of the league's head coaches. In its preseason top 100 player ranking, Alexander was listed at number 27 by ESPN. USA Today named him to its Preseason All-American third team and NBCSports.com named him as an honorable mention for its Preseason All-American team. He was also listed as a John R. Wooden Award Preseason Top 50 candidate and a Wayman Tisdale Award Watch list selection. Alexander was also included in the early December Naismith Award top 50 watch list.

Alexander began the season coming off the bench. On November 24, Alexander had his first double-digit output with 10 points against Rider. In the 2014 Orlando Classic semifinals against Tennessee on November 28, he posted 16 points. Then in the finals against #20 Michigan State on November 30, he contributed 4 blocks. On December 5 during the Big 12/SEC Challenge contest against Florida, Alexander posted a team-high 10 rebounds along with 12 points for his first collegiate double-double. On December 20, Alexander was expected to be in the starting lineup for the first time against Lafayette, but he was not. However, he started on December 22 against Temple. On January 19 against #19 Oklahoma, Alexander posted 13 points and 13 rebounds. The 13 rebounds in just 23 minutes played marked a career high for Alexander and an individual season high for the Jayhawks. Alexander was named Big 12 newcomer of the week on January 26, 2015. Alexander made his second start of the season on February 10 against Texas Tech, replacing Jamari Traylor in the lineup and posting 10 points, 4 blocks and 5 rebounds. On February 28, Alexander was inactivated due to an undisclosed NCAA investigation as a precautionary measure. He did not play any games after February 23 because of the investigation of his mother's initiation of pre-NBA draft loan processing.

== Professional career ==
=== Portland Trail Blazers (2015–2016) ===
On April 7, in the face of a battle for NCAA reinstatement that saw him miss the last 8 games of the season, Alexander declared for the 2015 NBA draft. On May 31, Alexander suffered a right knee injury in draft workout with the Los Angeles Lakers. He was not selected in the draft and became the second top-five college recruit to go undrafted after Scotty Hopson. Alexander joined the Brooklyn Nets for the 2015 NBA Summer League. He averaged 6.7 rebounds, 0.3 assists, and 1.5 blocks in 22 minutes per game in the Summer League. On July 24, 2015, Alexander signed a 2-year, $1.4 million contract with the Portland Trail Blazers. By the beginning of training camp, Alexander's injury caused him to be expected to miss two weeks. Alexander missed the entire preseason with the Trail Blazers due to his knee but made the roster and entered the season behind Meyers Leonard, Mason Plumlee, Ed Davis, Noah Vonleh, and Al-Farouq Aminu on the depth chart. Despite minor torn cartilage issues, Alexander was active for the first time on November 8 in Portland's seventh game of the season. Alexander played 17 minutes on November 15, posting 4 points, 4 rebounds and a block against Charlotte.

On March 10, 2016, using the flexible assignment rule, Alexander was assigned to the Santa Cruz Warriors, the D-League affiliate of the Golden State Warriors. On March 20, he was recalled by Portland.

On July 7, 2016, Alexander was waived by the Trail Blazers. The transaction was a maneuver to create salary cap space for Festus Ezeli. After he cleared waivers, the Trail Blazers added him to its NBA Summer League roster.

=== Erie BayHawks (2016–2017) ===
On September 8, 2016, Alexander signed with the Orlando Magic, but was later waived on October 16 after appearing in two preseason games. On October 29, he was acquired by the Erie BayHawks of the NBA Development League as an affiliate player of the Magic. In 22 games he averaged 11.9 points, 8.0 rebounds and 1.1 blocks in 24.5 minutes.

=== Long Island Nets (2017) ===
On January 31, 2017, Alexander was traded to the Long Island Nets in exchange for a 2017 third-round draft pick. On April 2, 2017, Alexander signed a 10-day contract with the Brooklyn Nets. He was waived two days later before appearing in a game for the Nets. The 10-day contract had been guaranteed and earned Alexander a year of service (toward payscale minimums and pension eligibility) in the NBA making him a 2-year veteran.

=== Wisconsin Herd (2017–2018) ===
On September 24, Alexander signed a one-year, non-guaranteed contract with the New Orleans Pelicans a few days before training camp began. Alexander was waived on October 14.

On October 20, it was announced that the Wisconsin Herd had acquired returning player rights to Alexander in a trade with Long Island. On November 2, which was the eve of the season tipoff, Alexander was issued a 5-game suspension for violating league's Anti-Drug Program.

=== ASVEL Basket (2018) ===
On March 24, 2018, ASVEL Basket was reported to have signed Alexander.

=== Le Mans Sarthe (2019–2020) ===
Alexander joined the Los Angeles Clippers for the 2019 NBA Summer League. On July 30, 2019, he signed with Le Mans Sarthe of the LNB Pro A.

=== Busan KT Sonicboom (2020–2021) ===
On November 24, 2020, Alexander signed with the Busan KT Sonicboom of the Korean Basketball League to replace Marcus Derrickson.

=== Daegu KOGAS Pegasus (2021–2022) ===
On July 14, 2021, Alexander signed with the Daegu KOGAS Pegasus of the Korean Basketball League. From January 20, 2022, Alexander was temporarily replaced by D. J. White for two weeks. On February 1, Alexander was replaced by D. J. White for the remainder of the season.

=== Sagesse Club (2022–2023) ===
Alexander joined Sagesse Club of the Lebanese Basketball League for the 2022–23 season.

During a game against Antranik Youth Association away from their homeground, Cliff would break one of the two fix backboards used for the game, suspending it for an hour. It's Antranik's second backboard broken in the span of a month, the first being broken by Elias Sebaaly, another player from Sagesse.

=== Beirut Club (2023–2024) ===
In October 2023, Alexander joined Beirut Club of the Lebanese Basketball League.

=== Guangxi Rhinos (2024) ===
In June 2024, Alexander joined Guangxi Rhinos of National Basketball League. Alexander averaged 10.6 points, 6.1 rebounds, 1.9 assists in 20.5 minutes in 10 games.

=== Al-Ahli (2024) ===
On August 10, 2024, Alexander signed with Al-Ahli of the Bahraini Basketball League.

=== Anyang Jung Kwan Jang Red Boosters (2024–2025) ===
On December 19, 2024, Alexander joined the Anyang Jung Kwan Jang Red Boosters of the Korean Basketball League to replace Michael Young. On January 17, 2025, he was replaced by Johnny O'Bryant III.

=== Guaiqueríes de Margarita (2025) ===
On March 2, 2025, Alexander signed with the Guaiqueríes de Margarita of the Superliga Profesional de Baloncesto (SPB).

== National team career ==
Alexander was selected by USA Basketball to represent Team USA in the inaugural 2013 FIBA Americas 3x3 U18 Championship in August. He helped the team achieve gold. In the September 26–29, 2013 FIBA 3x3 U18 World Championship in Jakarta, Indonesia, Team USA finished 9th with a 7–1 record, losing in the opening round of 16 in the playoffs.

== NBA career statistics ==
Legend
GP	Games played	GS	Games started	MPG	Minutes per game
FG%	Field goal percentage	3P%	3-point field goal percentage	FT%	Free throw percentage
RPG	Rebounds per game	APG	Assists per game	SPG	Steals per game
BPG	Blocks per game	PPG	Points per game	**Bold**	Career high

=== Regular season ===
Year	Team	GP	GS	MPG	FG%	3P%	FT%	RPG	APG	SPG	BPG	PPG
2015–16	Portland	8	0	4.5	.500	.000	.000	.8	.0	.1	.3	1.3
Career		8	0	4.5	.500	.000	.000	.8	.0	.1	.3	1.3

== Personal life ==
Alexander's father is 6-foot-7-inch (2.01 m) Clifton Terry, who played basketball for Robeson High School and Kennedy–King College. Following his time at the two-year Kennedy-King, Terry declared for the 2001 NBA draft. His professional career included time in the NBA Development League. Alexander picked up basketball late due to the lack of available safe courts to play on in his Chicago West Side neighborhood known as the Brian Piccolo community.
