= Pulaski station (CTA Orange Line) =

Chicago "L" station

Pulaski 4000W 5100S
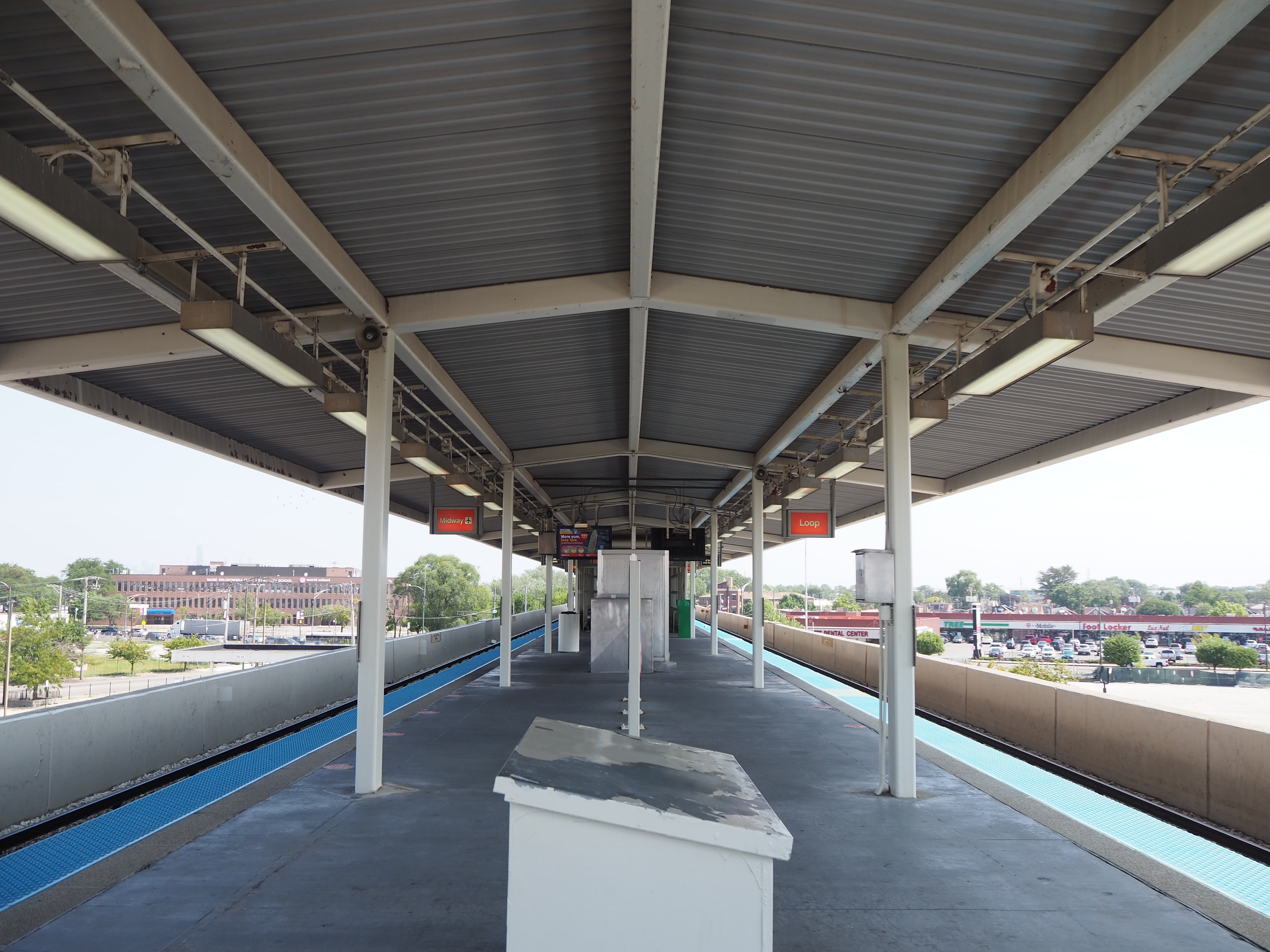

General information
- Location: 5106 South Pulaski Road; Chicago, Illinois 60632
- Coordinates: 41.799756°N 87.724493°W
- Owner: Chicago Transit Authority
- Line: Midway Branch
- Platforms: 1 island platform
- Tracks: 2
- Connections: CTA buses

Construction
- Structure type: Embankment
- Parking: 390 spaces
- Cycle facilities: Yes
- Accessible: Yes

History
- Opened: October 31, 1993; 32 years ago

Passengers
- 2025: 970,584 ▲3%

Services
| Preceding station | Chicago "L" | Following station |
|---|---|---|
| Midway Terminus | Orange Line | Kedzie toward Loop (Library) |
Track layout
Location

Pulaski is an 'L' station on the CTA's Orange Line, which runs between Midway Airport and The Loop; it is situated between Midway and Kedzie stations. Pulaski is located at Pulaski Road and 51st Street on the Southwest Side of Chicago, Illinois. The station is within the Archer Heights neighborhood, which is both residential and commercial, and the station itself is in a commercial district on Pulaski Road. Pulaski opened on October 31, 1993, the opening date of the Orange Line.

The Pulaski station was proposed in 1980 and constructed from 1987 to 1993. When the station opened in 1993, it spurred commercial development in the surrounding area and led to a parking controversy on nearby residential streets. Pulaski consists of an elevated island platform above a station house which is set back from Pulaski Road. The station also includes a bus terminal and a park and ride lot. Nearly 1.4 million passengers boarded Orange Line trains at Pulaski in 2010. Trains serve Pulaski approximately every ten minutes during rush hour but are less frequent at other times. In addition to offering train service, Pulaski also connects to several CTA bus routes.

== History ==
The Orange Line, including the Pulaski station, was first proposed in 1980 by Chicago Mayor Jane Byrne, who planned to fund the line using money from the canceled Crosstown Expressway project. U.S. Representative William Lipinski secured federal funding for the line in 1986 as a political favor from President Ronald Reagan, and Chicago Mayor Harold Washington signed a federal funding contract later that year. Construction began on the line in 1987 and was completed in 1993; the total cost of the line was $500 million. The Pulaski station was built over an abandoned Belt Railway of Chicago line which ran from 49th Street to Midway Airport. Pulaski, along with the rest of the Orange Line, opened on October 31, 1993. The CTA only charged riders 25 cents during the station's first three days of service, which were considered a test run of the line.

The Pulaski station spurred commercial development in the Archer Heights neighborhood. Area development began even before the station opened, as the Midway Square shopping mall opened at Pulaski Road and 51st Street in 1988 in anticipation of the potential customers the Orange Line would bring. The station's opening continued the trend of development, and Pulaski station was credited with boosting business in Archer Heights and doubling property values in the neighborhood. The station also created a parking problem in the neighborhood. The station's parking lot filled up as early as 7 A.M. most workdays, causing commuters to park on residential streets. The commuters prompted local residents to ban non-residents from parking on certain streets during daytime hours.

== Station layout ==
The Pulaski station was designed by the City of Chicago. The station house is at ground level and is set back from the street. It has a glass and steel façade, and most features within the station house are either made of stainless steel or painted white. The station's island platform is accessible from the station house via stairs, escalators, and an elevator. The platform serves the Orange Line's two tracks; the track to the Loop is located to the south, and the track to Midway located to the north. A canopy covers the entire platform. A bus terminal is located to the north of the station. To the west of the bus terminal and north of the railroad tracks is the Pulaski park and ride lot. The park and ride lot has 390 spaces which cost $4 for 12 hours and is operated by Standard Parking.

Pulaski serves the Archer Heights and West Elsdon neighborhoods of Chicago, which has both commercial and residential areas. Pulaski Road is primarily commercial, and most of the businesses on Pulaski Road rely on business from Orange Line commuters going to and from the station. However, side streets near the station such as Keeler Avenue are primarily residential. Curie Metropolitan High School, at Pulaski Road and Archer Avenue, is accessible from Pulaski station. The Polish Highlanders Alliance of North America, the cultural pillar of Chicago's Góral community, is also located nearby at 4808 S. Archer Avenue.

== Train service ==
Pulaski serves the CTA's Orange Line, which runs from The Loop to Midway Airport. Pulaski is the second inbound station on the line after Midway and is situated between the Midway and Kedzie stations. Pulaski is open from 3:55 A.M. to 1:20 A.M. on weekdays, 4:30 A.M. to 1:20 A.M. on Saturdays, and 5:30 A.M. to 11:50 P.M. on Sundays. Trains run approximately every ten minutes during rush hour and midday operation on all days, with more limited service in the early morning and night. Pulaski is two minutes from Midway and nineteen minutes from the first station in The Loop, Harold Washington Library – State/Van Buren. 1,393,509 passengers boarded at Pulaski in 2010; the station's ridership was the third-highest of any Orange Line station outside of The Loop, behind Midway and Roosevelt.

== Bus connections ==
CTA

- 53 Pulaski (Owl Service)
- 53A South Pulaski
- 62 Archer (Owl Service)

In addition to rail service, several CTA bus routes stop at Pulaski. The 53A South Pulaski runs south on Pulaski Road from the station during most daytime hours. The 62 Archer, which runs 24/7, also serves the Pulaski station through a stop on nearby Archer Avenue. The major Chicago streets, Pulaski Road, 51st Street, and Archer Avenue, are also accessible from the Pulaski station.
