= Jaxson Davis =

American basketball player (born 2007)

Monarch Academy
- Position: Point guard

Personal information
- Listed height: 6 ft 1 in (1.85 m)
- Listed weight: 180 lb (82 kg)

Career information
- High school: Warren Township (Gurnee, Illinois Monarch Academy (Kansas City, Kansas)

Career highlights
- 2× Illinois Mr. Basketball (2025, 2026); 2x Illinois Gatorade Player of the Year (2025, 2026)

Jaxson Davis (born c. 2009) is an American high school basketball player who currently has transferred to Monarch Academy in Kansas City, Kansas after attending Warren Township High School in Gurnee, a northern suburb of Chicago, in Lake County, Illinois through his junior season. He is a consensus four-star recruit in the class of 2027. He was the first sophomore to ever win Illinois Mr. Basketball and the first to win the award twice before his senior season. He is also a two-time Illinois Gatorade Player of the Year winner. In 2024, he was named a MaxPreps Freshman All-American.

== Background ==
Davis's father, Brian, played for Illinois Fighting Illini football. He was a converted linebacker in the 1992 recruiting class with Kevin Hardy and Simeon Rice (a year behind Dana Howard and John Holecek). Davis took an unofficial visit to Illinois in the fall of 2024. He has a brother, one class behind him, who plays football. His brother was on the junior varsity basketball team as a sophomore. Jaxson Davis grew up around basketball because of his father's profession as a basketball facilities administrator. He grew up watching Jabari Parker and his family photos include pictures of him being cradled by Kobe Bryant as a baby, with Derrick Rose and Jimmy Butler as a young kid as well as with Jalen Brunson.

== High school career ==
Before beginning his high school career, Davis held an offer from Western Illinois. Aside from AAU basketball, he played no organized basketball until his freshman varsity season. He started his freshman season as a nationally ranked player and posted impressive early numbers. Davis's reputation preceded him to varsity basketball, where in his freshman debut, he was guarded with a box-and-one defense, but scored 15 points in the team's 84–55 win. The team achieved a 16–1 record to start the season, including four games in the Proviso West tournament, where he scored 36 points in the championship game. He was the first freshman MVP of the Proviso West Tournament. Late in 2023, Illinois gave Davis his second offer. Davis posted 19.4 points, 5.2 rebounds, 3.6 assists and 3.5 steals, earning all-state first-team recognition from both the Illinois Basketball Coaches Association and the Illinois media as well as 2023–24 Lake County News-Sun Boys Basketball Lake County Player of the Year. He was named a 2024 MaxPreps Freshman All-American. In the 2024 IHSA Class 4A NIU Supersectional (quarterfinal), Davis nearly propelled Warren to the state semifinals by tieing the score 3 times in the fourth quarter, including a three point play with 46 seconds left. Warren, which finished with a 31–5 record, lost to Palatine High School 55–53. Davis earned Class 4 first-team All-state recognition.

As a sophomore, he averaged 19.5 points, 4 rebounds, 6.1 assists and 2.8 steals while leading Warren to the runner-up finish at the IHSA Class 4A state championship. He was named the 2024–25 Illinois Gatorade Player of the Year. In the 2025 Illinois Mr. Basketball voting (conducted by the Chicago Tribune and the Illinois Basketball Coaches Association) he became the first sophomore winner in the 45-year history of the award. With 41 first-place votes and being named on 87 or 150 ballots, Davis outranked second-place finisher sophomore, Davion Thompson of Bolingbrook High School and senior Docker Tedeschi of Benton Consolidated High School who finished third. However, the Chicago Sun-Times selected Thompson as the first sophomore winner in the 67-year history of its Player of the Year award. The Illinois media also listed Thompson as its Class 4A player of the year, with Davis being a Class 4A first-team all-state selection. Illinois basketball head coach Brad Underwood and three of his assistant coaches Orlando Antigua, Geoff Alexander and Zach Hamer, attended the 2025 Class 4A state championship game at State Farm Center when Davis posted 17 points, eight assists, seven rebounds and four steals as Warren lost 55–54 to Benet Academy. Warren finished with a 26–11 record. Benet had lost its previous three state championship games and Warren had lost in 1999 and 2011.

By the end of his sophomore season, he held more state offers from Northwestern, DePaul and Eastern Illinois. Within weeks he had offers from Purdue, Indiana and Arizona State. His summer Nike Elite Youth Basketball League performances, where he teamed with Thompson, contributed to offers from Iowa, Marquette, Notre Dame, Ohio State, and Toledo as well as interest by BYU, Louisville Michigan State, Oklahoma, UCLA, and Virginia Tech by late August. Although Thompson is also a guard, Davis did enough of the ballhandling to lead the EYBL in assists during its regular season.

In September of his junior season, he was ranked as the number 64 prospect in the 2027 national class. By late February, he had risen to the 40th ranked player in his class. During his junior season, he scheduled unofficial visits to Purdue and Michigan. Davis also visited Michigan State. He repeated as 2025–26 Illinois Gatorade Player of the Year. He also repeated as the 2026 Illinois Mr. Basketball with 53 first place votes and listing on 89 of 129 ballots for 361 points, ahead of Whitney Young's Marquis Clark, 176 points and Kankakee's Lincoln Williams with 135 points. He joined two-time winners Jabari Parker and E. J. Liddell who both won their junior and senior seasons. For the season, Davis averaged 23.8 points, 5.3 rebounds, 5.3 assists and 3.5 steals as Warren went 30–4. The team was eliminated from the 2026 Class 4A IHSA playoffs in the sectional semifinals as Davis appeared hindered from a head injury. At the time of the April 2026 Mr. Basketball announcement, 247Sports ranked him as the number 51 player and number 12 point guard in the national class of 2027. Davis earned the 2026 Sun-Times Player of the year after Thompson and Devin Cleveland transferred to out of state prep school. Davis was an Illinois Media Class 4A player of the year and unanimous first team All-state selection.

In June 2026, he announced that he would transfer to Monarch Academy in Kansas City, Kansas, to compete in the Nike EYBL Scholastic conference for his senior season.

== International play ==
Davis competed in Men's Junior National Team minicamps in October 2025 and April 2026 hosted by USA Basketball. In May 2026, he was one of 35 players invited to tryout for the 12-man United States men's national under-18 basketball team selected by USA Basketball for to compete in the June 1–7 2026 FIBA U18 AmeriCup. Davis did not make the final roster.
