= Captain Clutch =

Captain Clutch is a nickname that has been used to refer to multiple athletes. It may refer to:

- Marie-Philip Poulin (born 1991), Canadian ice hockey player
- Derek Jeter (born 1974), American former baseball player
- Joe Sakic (born 1969), Canadian former ice hockey player
- Jalen Brunson (born 1996), American basketball player
