= Rick Brunson =

American basketball player and coach (born 1972)

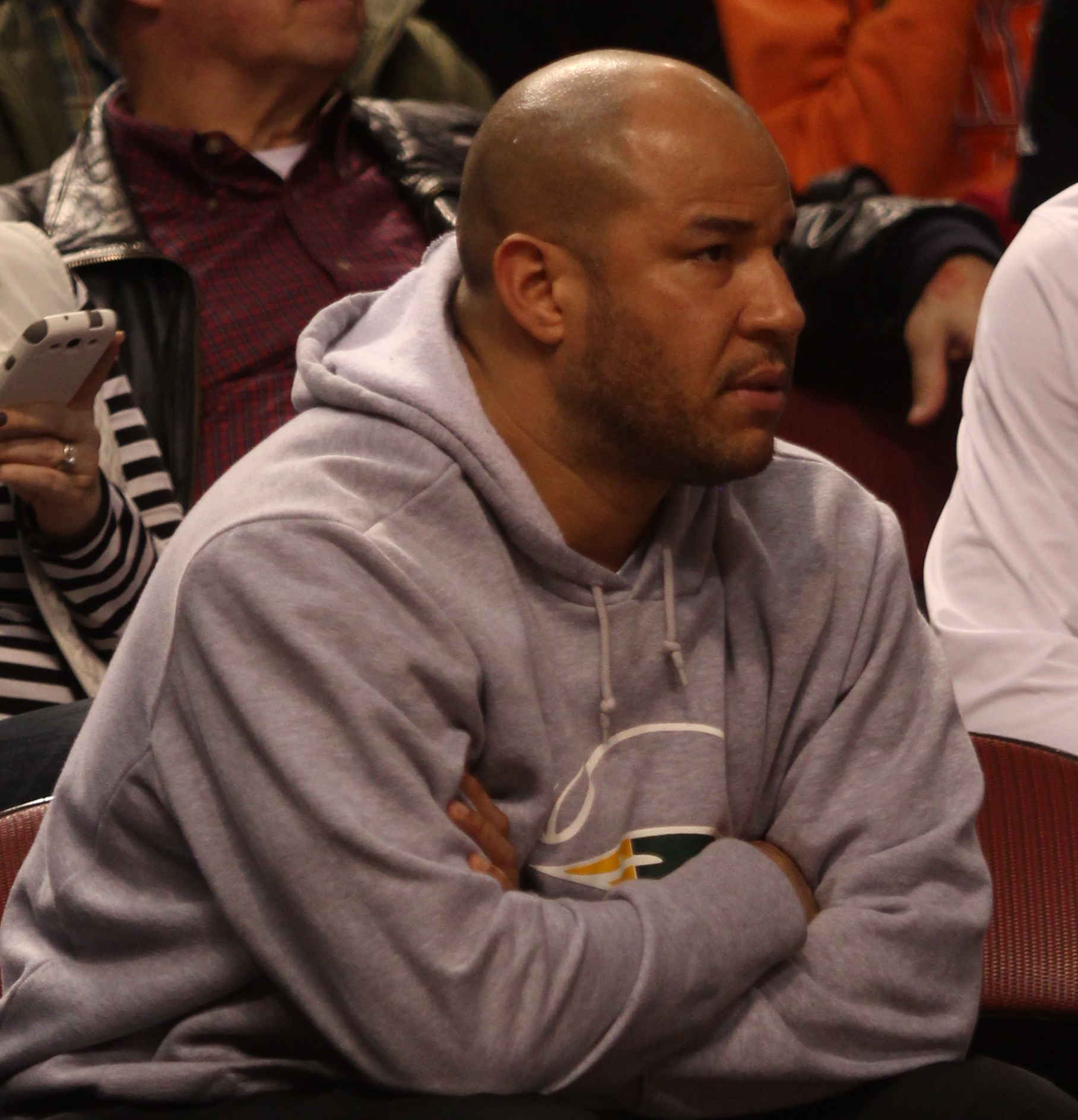
- Brunson watching the 2014 IHSA tournament at the Peoria Civic Center

New York Knicks
- Title: Assistant coach
- League: NBA

Personal information
- Born: June 14, 1972 (age 54) Syracuse, New York, U.S.
- Listed height: 6 ft 4 in (1.93 m)
- Listed weight: 190 lb (86 kg)

Career information
- High school: Salem (Salem, Massachusetts)
- College: Temple (1991–1995)
- NBA draft: 1995: undrafted
- Playing career: 1996–2006
- Position: Point guard
- Number: 9, 11, 40, 5

Career history

Playing
- 1996: Adelaide 36ers
- 1996–1997: Quad City Thunder
- 1997: Connecticut Pride
- 1997–1998: Portland Trail Blazers
- 1998: Ginebra San Miguel
- 1998–1999: Connecticut Pride
- 1999–2000: New York Knicks
- 2000: Boston Celtics
- 2000–2001: New York Knicks
- 2001–2002: Portland Trail Blazers
- 2002–2003: Chicago Bulls
- 2003: Toronto Raptors
- 2003–2004: Chicago Bulls
- 2004: Progresso Castelmaggiore
- 2004–2005: Los Angeles Clippers
- 2005–2006: Seattle SuperSonics
- 2006: Houston Rockets

Coaching
- 2007: Denver Nuggets (assistant)
- 2009–2010: Hartford (assistant)
- 2010–2012: Chicago Bulls (assistant)
- 2012–2013: Charlotte Bobcats (assistant)
- 2016–2018: Minnesota Timberwolves (assistant)
- 2019–2022: Camden HS
- 2022–present: New York Knicks (assistant)

Career highlights
- As player: First-team All-Atlantic 10 (1995); Second-team All-Atlantic 10 (1994); McDonald's All-American Co-MVP (1991); As assistant coach: NBA champion (2026); NBA Cup champion (2025)

Career NBA statistics
- Points: 1,090 (3.2 ppg)
- Rebounds: 447 (1.3 rpg)
- Assists: 876 (2.6 apg)
- Stats at NBA.com
- Stats at Basketball Reference

Eric Daniel "Rick" Brunson (born June 14, 1972) is an American professional basketball coach and former player who is an assistant coach for the New York Knicks of the National Basketball Association (NBA). He played college basketball for the Temple Owls. He played nine seasons in the NBA and has worked as an assistant coach for several teams. As a coach, Brunson won an NBA championship with the Knicks in 2026, where his son Jalen also played.

== Early life ==
Born in Syracuse, New York, he attended Salem High School, becoming one of two McDonald's All-Americans from Massachusetts in 1991. Rick is biracial, having a black father and a white mother. He was raised with his four siblings by a single mother in a modest two-bedroom apartment in Syracuse.

Brunson played college basketball for the Temple Owls. He averaged 16.7 points, 5.9 rebounds and 4.1 assists during his senior season. Brunson's 1,493 career points ranked 11th in program history while his 253 steals and 191 three-pointers each ranked third.

== Professional playing career ==
Brunson was not selected in the 1995 NBA draft, which was attributed to his inconsistent shooting and lack of speed. He spent the preseason with the Philadelphia 76ers and was the last player the team cut before the 1995–96 NBA season. Head coach John Lucas II called it one of his toughest decisions ever as a coach because he wanted a local player for the team and Brunson "was very, very close".

On November 20, 1995, Brunson signed with the Adelaide 36ers of the Australian National Basketball League (NBL). He was selected as the team's most valuable player during the 1996 NBL season. He played in the Continental Basketball Association the next season. He was signed as a free agent by the Portland Trail Blazers in 1997–98, playing again in the CBA at the start of the 1998–99 season. He also had a brief stint in the Philippines as the import for the most popular ball club in the Philippine Basketball Association, Ginebra San Miguel, in 1998.

Brunson then signed with the New York Knicks, and was a member of the 1999 Eastern Conference championship team. In the 1999 NBA playoffs especially 1999 NBA Finals, he amassed a few stat lines that later became known as Club Trillion (Only non-zero stat is minutes followed by 0s in all other stats). In 2000–01, he started with the Boston Celtics, but finished the season with the Knicks again. He rejoined the Trail Blazers in 2001–02. The next season he signed with the Chicago Bulls, splitting between the Bulls and the Toronto Raptors in 2003–04. He joined the Los Angeles Clippers for the 2004–05 season, his best season as a pro, during which he averaged a career-high 5.5 points per game. This helped him land a contract the next year with the Seattle SuperSonics, but he appeared in only four games that season due to injury. On February 28, 2006, the Sonics waived Brunson. He was subsequently signed by the Houston Rockets, with which he finished his ninth and final season as a professional basketball player.

== Coaching career ==
From January to April 2007, Brunson worked as an assistant coach with the Denver Nuggets, focusing on player development. From 2007 to 2009, he was the University of Virginia Cavaliers' director of basketball operations. In May 2009, Brunson was hired as assistant coach for the Hartford Hawks men's basketball team. On September 8, 2010, he was hired as an assistant coach for the Chicago Bulls.

During the 2012–13 season, Brunson served as an assistant coach to Mike Dunlap on the Charlotte Bobcats' staff.

On September 25, 2016, Brunson was hired by the Minnesota Timberwolves as an assistant coach. In May 2018, he resigned amid allegations of misconduct toward two women, but strongly denied the allegations.

Brunson coached at Camden High School in Camden, New Jersey. He was Dajuan Wagner Jr.'s head coach. Brunson resigned before the 2020–21 season while Camden High was ranked the #7 team in the country, but changed his mind a couple of days later and remained coach until 2022.

On June 2, 2022, the New York Knicks hired Brunson as an assistant coach. His son, Jalen, joined him on the Knicks a month later, when he signed a four-year $104 million contract. In 2026, Jalen and Rick became the first father and son duo to win the NBA Finals together on the same team, with one as a player and the other on the coaching staff.

== Personal life ==
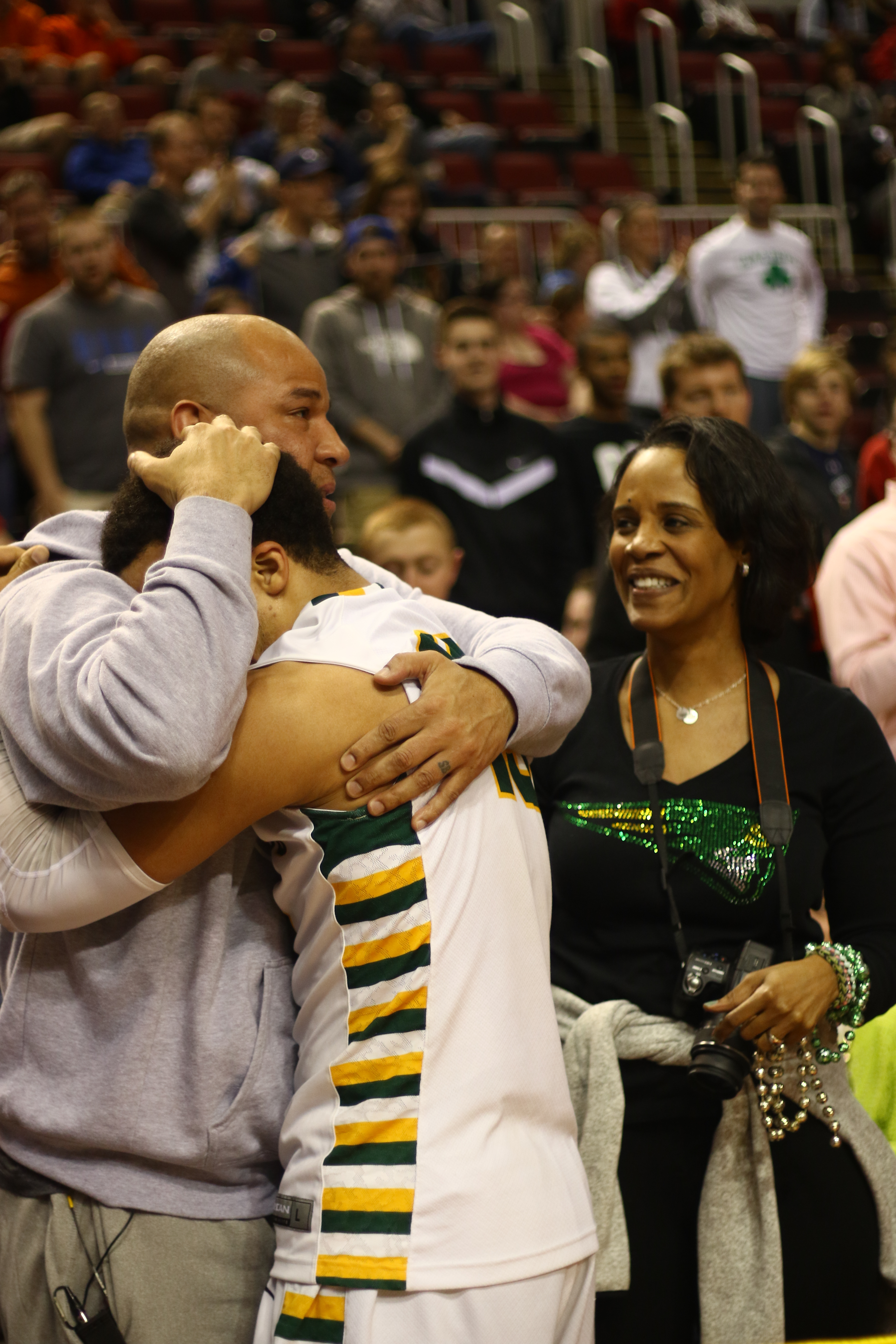
Brunson with son Jalen and wife Sandra in 2015

Brunson met his wife, Sandra, at Temple University, where he played for the Owls men's basketball team and she played volleyball. The couple has two children: Jalen (born 1996) and Erica (born c. 2000/01). The family lived in Cherry Hill, New Jersey, for much of his NBA career, but moved seven times before settling in 2010 in Lincolnshire, Illinois, where Jalen played for Adlai E. Stevenson High School before joining Villanova.

Jalen was named the 2014 and 2015 Illinois Boys' Basketball Gatorade Player of the Year as a junior and senior, was named to the 2015 McDonald's All-American Boys Game roster, was named Illinois Mr. Basketball, and led his team to the 2015 Illinois High School Association Class 4A championship. He now plays for the New York Knicks, winning a championship for the team in 2026, ending their 53-year championship drought.

Brunson met Tom Thibodeau in 1987, when he was 15, and they both played in men's league games in Salem. Both have said their shared competitiveness on the court led to a partnership that saw Brunson being an assistant with Thibodeau on the Timberwolves, the Bulls, and the Knicks until the end of the 2024–25 season.

== Career statistics ==
Legend
| GP | Games played | GS | Games started | MPG | Minutes per game |
| FG% | Field goal percentage | 3P% | 3-point field goal percentage | FT% | Free throw percentage |
| RPG | Rebounds per game | APG | Assists per game | SPG | Steals per game |
| BPG | Blocks per game | PPG | Points per game | **Bold** | Career high |
| * | Led the league |

=== NBA ===
Source

=== Regular season ===
| Year | Team | GP | GS | MPG | FG% | 3P% | FT% | RPG | APG | SPG | BPG | PPG |
|---|---|---|---|---|---|---|---|---|---|---|---|---|
| 1997–98 | Portland | 38 | 10 | 16.4 | .348 | .361 | .677 | 1.5 | 2.6 | .7 | .1 | 4.3 |
| 1998–99 | New York | 17 | 0 | 5.6 | .286 | .000 | .278 | .6 | 1.1 | .5 | .0 | 1.0 |
| 1999–00 | New York | 37 | 0 | 7.8 | .414 | .154 | .611 | .7 | 1.3 | .2 | .0 | 1.9 |
| 2000–01 | Boston | 7 | 0 | 20.3 | .286 | .182 | .444 | 1.3 | 3.4 | **1.0** | .1 | 3.7 |
| 2000–01 | New York | 15 | 0 | 4.4 | .421 | .000 | .667 | .8 | .5 | .1 | .0 | 1.3 |
| 2001–02 | Portland | 59 | 2 | 8.8 | .398 | .545 | .707 | 1.2 | 1.9 | .4 | .0 | 2.1 |
| 2002–03 | Chicago | 17 | 0 | 11.5 | .460 | **.667** | .833 | 1.1 | 2.1 | .6 | **.2** | 3.5 |
| 2003–04 | Toronto | 3 | 0 | 3.3 | .500 | – | – | .0 | .7 | .0 | .0 | 1.3 |
| 2003–04 | Chicago | 37 | 0 | 10.9 | .376 | .478 | **.871** | 1.0 | 2.2 | .7 | .1 | 3.1 |
| 2004–05 | L.A. Clippers | **80** | **39** | **24.3** | .376 | .369 | .770 | **2.3** | **5.1** | **1.0** | .1 | **5.5** |
| 2005–06 | Seattle | 4 | 0 | 7.8 | **.625** | .000 | – | .5 | .5 | .0 | .0 | 2.5 |
| 2005–06 | Houston | 23 | 0 | 9.3 | .348 | .417 | .583 | .9 | 1.4 | .3 | .0 | 1.9 |
| Career | | 337 | 51 | 13.5 | .378 | .362 | .693 | 1.3 | 2.6 | .6 | .1 | 3.2 |

=== Playoffs ===
| Year | Team | GP | GS | MPG | FG% | 3P% | FT% | RPG | APG | SPG | BPG | PPG |
|---|---|---|---|---|---|---|---|---|---|---|---|---|
| 1999 | New York | **9** | 0 | **2.0** | **.400** | – | **1.000** | **.1** | .2 | .0 | .0 | .7 |
| 2000 | New York | 3 | 0 | 1.3 | .000 | – | – | .0 | **.3** | **.3** | .0 | .0 |
| 2001 | New York | 2 | 0 | **2.0** | .000 | – | .750 | .0 | .0 | .0 | .0 | **1.5** |
| 2002 | Portland | 2 | 0 | 1.0 | – | – | – | .0 | .0 | .0 | .0 | .0 |
| Career | | 16 | 0 | 1.8 | .286 | – | .833 | .1 | .2 | .1 | .0 | .6 |
