= Illinois Mr. Basketball =

U.S. state high school sports award

The Illinois Mr. Basketball award is given to the person chosen as the best high school boys basketball player in the U.S. state of Illinois.

Most of the award winners have gone on to play at the highest levels of college basketball, and many have gone on to play in the National Basketball Association. On April 5, 2010, Jon Scheyer became the second winner to also have played on both a high school state championship and a Division 1 NCAA championship team, with Brian Sloan being the first. In 2012 Jabari Parker became the first non-senior to win the award, and in 2013 he became the first to win the award twice. In 2017 Mark Smith became the 12th winner to enroll at the University of Illinois. Jaxson Davis was the first sophomore winner and the first to win twice before his senior season.

Voting is done on a points system. Each voter selects first, second, and third-place votes. A player receives five points for each first-place vote, three points for each second-place vote, and one point for a third-place vote. The player who receives the most points receives the award.

== Award recipients ==
Year	Illinois Mr. Basketball	School	Points received	College	NBA Draft	Ref
2026	Jaxson Davis	Warren Township High School, Gurnee	361			
2025	Jaxson Davis	Warren Township High School, Gurnee	315			
2024	Morez Johnson Jr.	Thornton Township High School, Harvey	130	Illinois, Michigan	2026 NBA draft: 1st round, 9th overall by the Dallas Mavericks	
2023	Brock Harding	Moline High School, Moline	272	Iowa, TCU		
2022	Braden Huff	Glenbard West High School, Glen Ellyn	473	Gonzaga		
2021	n/a					
2020	Adam Miller	Morgan Park High School, Chicago	142	Illinois, LSU, Arizona State		
2019	E. J. Liddell	Belleville West, Belleville	506	Ohio State	2022 NBA draft: 2nd round, 41st overall by the New Orleans Pelicans	
2018	E. J. Liddell	Belleville West, Belleville	432	Ohio State	2022 NBA draft: 2nd round, 41st overall by the New Orleans Pelicans	
2017	Mark Smith	Edwardsville High School, Edwardsville	251	Illinois, Missouri, Kansas State		
2016	Charlie Moore	Morgan Park High School, Chicago	221	Cal, Kansas, DePaul, Miami		
2015	Jalen Brunson	Adlai E. Stevenson High School, Lincolnshire	552	Villanova	2018 NBA draft: 2nd round, 33rd overall by the Dallas Mavericks	
2014	Jahlil Okafor	Whitney M. Young Magnet High School, Chicago	492	Duke	2015 NBA draft: 1st round, 3rd overall by the Philadelphia 76ers	
2013	Jabari Parker	Simeon Career Academy, Chicago	315	Duke	2014 NBA draft: 1st round, 2nd overall by the Milwaukee Bucks	
2012	Jabari Parker	Simeon Career Academy, Chicago	400	Duke	2014 NBA draft: 1st round, 2nd overall by the Milwaukee Bucks	
2011	Ryan Boatright	East Aurora High School, Aurora	257	UConn		
2011	Chasson Randle	Rock Island High School, Rock Island	257	Stanford		
2010	Jereme Richmond	Waukegan High School, Waukegan	455	Illinois		
2009	Brandon Paul	Warren Township High School, Gurnee	337	Illinois		
2008	Kevin Dillard	Homewood-Flossmoor High School, Flossmoor	228	Southern Illinois, Dayton		
2007	Derrick Rose	Simeon Career Academy, Chicago	720	Memphis	2008 NBA draft: 1st round, 1st overall by the Chicago Bulls	
2006	Jon Scheyer	Glenbrook North High School, Northbrook	1,187	Duke		
2005	Julian Wright	Homewood-Flossmoor High School, Flossmoor	645	Kansas	2007 NBA draft: 1st round, 14th overall by the New Orleans Hornets	
2004	Shaun Livingston	Peoria Central High School, Peoria	1,056	none	2004 NBA draft: 1st round, 4th overall by the Los Angeles Clippers	
2003	Shannon Brown	Proviso East High School, Maywood	887	Michigan State	2006 NBA draft: 1st round, 25th overall by the Cleveland Cavaliers	
2002	Dee Brown	Proviso East High School, Maywood	952	Illinois	2006 NBA draft: 2nd round, 46th overall by the Utah Jazz	
2001	Eddy Curry	Thornwood High School, South Holland	1,443	none	2001 NBA draft: 1st round, 4th overall by the Chicago Bulls	
2000	Darius Miles	East St. Louis High School, East St. Louis	217	none	2000 NBA draft: 1st round, 3rd overall by the Los Angeles Clippers	
1999	Brian Cook	Lincoln High School, Lincoln	903	Illinois	2003 NBA draft: 1st round, 24th overall by the Los Angeles Lakers	
1998	Frank Williams	Manual High School, Peoria	1,049	Illinois	2002 NBA draft: 1st round, 25th overall by the Denver Nuggets	
1997	Sergio McClain	Manual High School, Peoria	1,361	Illinois		
1996	Ronnie Fields	Farragut Academy, Chicago	1,270	none		
1995	Kevin Garnett	Farragut Academy, Chicago	1,443	none	1995 NBA draft: 1st round, 5th overall by the Minnesota Timberwolves	
1994	Jarrod Gee	St. Martin de Porres High School, Chicago	658	Illinois		
1993	Rashard Griffith	King College Prep High School, Chicago	1,329	Wisconsin	1995 NBA draft: 2nd round, 38th overall by the Milwaukee Bucks	
1992	Chris Collins	Glenbrook North High School	1,195	Duke		
1991	Howard Nathan	Manual High School, Peoria	822	DePaul, Louisiana-Monroe		
1990	Jamie Brandon	King College Prep High School, Chicago	826	LSU		
1989	Deon Thomas	Simeon Vocational High School, Chicago	959	Illinois	1994 NBA draft: 2nd round, 28th overall by the Dallas Mavericks	
1988	Eric Anderson	St. Francis de Sales High School, Chicago	1,490	Indiana		
1987	Marcus Liberty	King College Prep High School, Chicago	1,286	Illinois	1990 NBA draft: 2nd round, 42nd overall by the Denver Nuggets	
1986	Nick Anderson	Simeon Vocational High School, Chicago	876	Illinois	1989 NBA draft: 1st round, 11th overall by the Orlando Magic	
1985	Ed Horton	Lanphier High School, Springfield	1,735	Iowa	1989 NBA draft: 2nd round, 39th overall by the Washington Bullets	
1984	Brian Sloan	McLeansboro High School, McLeansboro	1,303	Indiana		
1983	Marty Simmons	Lawrenceville High School, Lawrenceville	2,056	Indiana, Evansville		
1982	Bruce Douglas	Quincy Senior High School, Quincy	1,700	Illinois	1986 NBA draft: 3rd round, 57th overall by the Sacramento Kings	
1981	Walter Downing	Providence Catholic High School, New Lenox	1,301	DePaul, Marquette	1986 NBA draft: 6th round, 138th overall by the Boston Celtics	

=== Awards by high school ===
School	City	Number of awards	Years
Simeon Career Academy	Chicago	5	1986, 1989, 2007, 2012, 2013
King College Prep High School	Chicago	3	1987, 1990, 1993
Manual High School	Peoria	3	1991, 1997, 1998
Belleville West	Belleville	2	2018, 2019
Farragut Academy	Chicago	2	1995, 1996
Glenbrook North High School	Northbrook	2	1992, 2006
Homewood-Flossmoor High School	Flossmoor	2	2005, 2008
Morgan Park High School	Chicago	2	2016, 2020
Proviso East High School	Maywood	2	2002, 2003
Warren Township High School	Gurnee	2	2009, 2025
Adlai E. Stevenson High School	Lincolnshire	1	2015
East Aurora High School	Aurora	1	2011*
East St. Louis High School	East St. Louis	1	2000
Edwardsville High School	Edwardsville	1	2017
Glenbard West High School	Glen Ellyn	1	2022
Lanphier High School	Springfield	1	1985
Lawrenceville High School	Lawrenceville	1	1983
Lincoln High School	Lincoln	1	1999
McLeansboro High School	McLeansboro	1	1984
Moline High School	Moline	1	2023
Peoria Central High School	Peoria	1	2004
Providence Catholic High School	New Lenox	1	1981
Quincy Senior High School	Quincy	1	1982
Rock Island High School	Rock Island	1	2011*
St. Francis de Sales High School	Chicago	1	1988
St. Martin de Porres High School	Chicago	1	1994
Thornton Township High School	Harvey	1	2024
Thornwood High School	South Holland	1	2001
Waukegan High School	Waukegan	1	2010
Whitney M. Young Magnet High School	Chicago	1	2014

* - Indicates a tie in which the award was shared

== See also ==
- Illinois Miss Basketball
