= Mike Sullivan (offensive lineman) =

American football player and coach (born 1967)

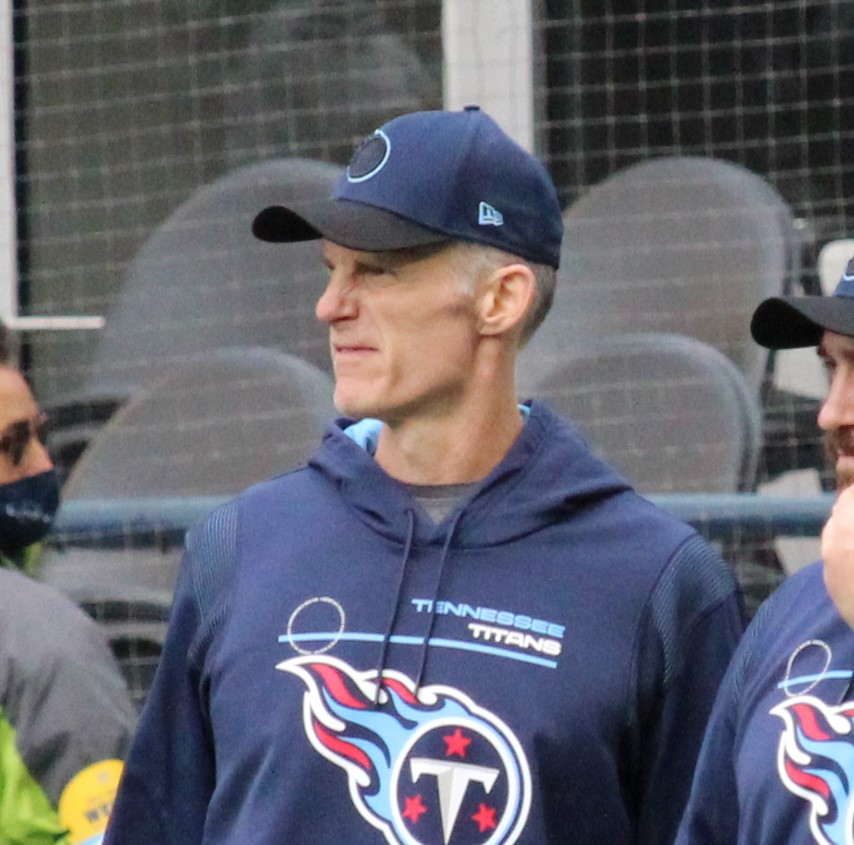
- Sullivan with the Tennessee Titans in 2021

No. 67
- Position: Offensive lineman

Personal information
- Born: December 22, 1967 (age 58); Chicago, Illinois, U.S.
- Listed height: 6 ft 3 in (1.91 m)
- Listed weight: 292 lb (132 kg)

Career information
- High school: St. Francis DeSales (Chicago)
- College: Miami (FL)
- NFL draft: 1991: 6th round, 153rd overall pick

Career history

Playing
- Dallas Cowboys (1991); Tampa Bay Buccaneers (1992–1995); Chicago Bears (1996)*
- * Offseason or practice squad member only

Coaching
- Miami (FL) (2000) Graduate assistant; Cleveland Browns (2001–2004) Assistant offensive line coach; Western Michigan (2005–2006) Offensive line coach; Cleveland Browns (2007–2008) Offensive line coach; San Diego Chargers (2009–2012) Offensive line coach; Cleveland Browns (2013) Offensive line coach; Tennessee Titans (2014–2017) Assistant offensive line coach; Tennessee Titans (2018) Offensive assistant; Tennessee Titans (2019–2023) Assistant offensive line coach

Awards and highlights
- 2× National champion (1987, 1989); Second-team All-American (1990); 2× First-team All-South Independent (1989, 1990); Second-team All-South Independent(1988)

Career NFL statistics
- Games played: 48
- Games started: 4
- Stats at Pro Football Reference

Michael Gerard Sullivan (born December 22, 1967) is an American former professional football player and coach. He played in the NFL as an offensive guard for the Dallas Cowboys and Tampa Bay Buccaneers. He played college football for the Miami Hurricanes.

== Early life ==
Sullivan attended St. Francis DeSales High School, where he was a three-year starter and was named All-Midwest as a senior. He accepted a football scholarship from the University of Miami where he was redshirted as a freshman. He played his first two years at left offensive guard, before being switched to left tackle as a junior.

He started a school record 48 consecutive games (all of the games in his college career), despite dealing with different injuries, including the removal of a benign tumor near his left ear in 1989.

Sullivan contributed to a 44-4 record, two national championships (1987, 1989), and the first 36 contests of the 58-game NCAA record home winning streak. One of two players in school history to earn an NCAA Post-Graduate Scholarship (only 15 are awarded per year) and the only two-time winner of the CBS/Toyota Leadership Award.

In 2009, he was inducted into the University of Miami Sports Hall of Fame.

== Professional career ==
=== Dallas Cowboys ===
Sullivan was selected in the sixth round (153rd overall) by the Dallas Cowboys in the 1991 NFL draft, with the intention of playing him at offensive guard. He originally failed his physical but was later approved to participate in training camp.

He was waived on August 26 and later re-signed to the practice squad. After being signed to the active roster, he was released on November 22 and re-signed to the practice squad.

=== Tampa Bay Buccaneers ===
In 1992, he signed as a free agent with the Tampa Bay Buccaneers. He played four years mainly as a back-up offensive lineman and on special teams. He became a free agent on February 16, 1996.

=== Chicago Bears ===
On March 26, 1996, he was signed as a free agent by the Chicago Bears. He was released before the season started on August 28.

== Coaching career ==
Sullivan helped four teams to championships over the span of his coaching career in the European Federation of American Football. After spending the 2000 season as a graduate assistant for the University of Miami, he joined former Hurricane coach Butch Davis's coaching staff with the Cleveland Browns. He was an offensive assistant for three-and-a-half seasons and coached tight ends for half a season in 2004.

On January 21, 2005, he was named offensive line coach at Western Michigan University. In 2007, he was named the offensive line coach for the Browns. In 2009, he was hired as the offensive line coach of the San Diego Chargers. In 2013, he returned to the Browns as their offensive line coach. In 2014, he was hired as an assistant offensive line coach for the Tennessee Titans. He moved to offensive assistant for the 2018 season, and was assistant offensive line coach again from 2019 to 2023.
