= Eric Anderson (basketball, born 1970) =

American basketball player (1970–2018)

Personal information
- Born: May 26, 1970 Chicago, Illinois, U.S.
- Died: December 9, 2018 (aged 48) Carmel, Indiana, U.S.
- Listed height: 6 ft 9 in (2.06 m)
- Listed weight: 220 lb (100 kg)

Career information
- High school: St. Francis de Sales (Chicago, Illinois)
- College: Indiana (1988–1992)
- NBA draft: 1992: undrafted
- Playing career: 1992–1998
- Position: Power forward
- Number: 42

Career history
- 1992–1994: New York Knicks
- 1994–1995: Andorra
- 1995–1996: Fort Wayne Fury
- 1996: Cagiva Varese
- 1996: Galatasaray
- 1996–1997: Faber Fabriano
- 1997–1998: Fort Wayne Fury

Career highlights
- First-team All-Big Ten (1991); Big Ten Newcomer of the Year (1989); Illinois Mr. Basketball (1988); McDonald's All-American (1988); Second-team Parade All-American (1988); Fourth-team Parade All-American (1987)
- Stats at NBA.com
- Stats at Basketball Reference
Medals
Men's basketball
Representing United States
Summer Universiade
Gold medal – first place	1991 Sheffield	National team

Eric Walfred Anderson (May 26, 1970 – December 9, 2018) was an American basketball player. He played college basketball for the Indiana Hoosiers and played two seasons in the National Basketball Association (NBA) for the New York Knicks.

== Amateur career ==
Anderson attended St. Francis de Sales High School on Chicago's far southeast side and was named 1988's Mr. Basketball for the state of Illinois as well as a McDonald's All-American in the same year. He appears in one scene in the documentary Hoop Dreams.

Anderson then enrolled at Indiana University Bloomington, where he played for the Hoosiers while studying sociology. He was named Most Outstanding Player of 1992 NCAA Tournament's West Regional after helping lead Indiana to the Final Four. He completed his college career with 1,715 points and 825 rebounds.

== Professional career ==
Anderson signed with the New York Knicks for the 1992–93 NBA season as an undrafted free agent. As the team's twelfth man, he played only 44 total minutes in sixteen games, and 39 minutes in eleven games the following season before being waived. He received a loud ovation by fans when inserted in the final six minutes of the Knicks' 114–79 home blowout over the Boston Celtics on February 2, 1994, in which he went scoreless with four personal fouls while the Knicks bench later stood and cheered his drawing an offensive foul. Anderson held NBA career averages of 1.6 points and 1.1 rebounds, and 2-for-2 on three-point field goals. He spent the remainder of his career playing in Europe and with the Fort Wayne Fury of the Continental Basketball Association until retiring in 1998.

== Personal life ==
Anderson was married to fitness guru Tracy Anderson from 1998 to 2008 and had a son named Sam.

== Death ==
Anderson died on December 9, 2018, in Carmel, Indiana. An autopsy was conducted, and preliminary findings suggested that he died of natural causes.

Awards and achievements
Preceded by Marcus Liberty	Illinois Mr. Basketball Award Winner; 1988	Succeeded by Deon Thomas
