= Tracy Anderson =

American fitness entrepreneur and author

- Born: March 3, 1975 (age 51); Noblesville, Indiana, U.S.
- Education: American Musical and Dramatic Academy
- Occupations: Entrepreneur, Fitness Trainer, Author
- Known for: Tracy Anderson Method
- Spouses: Eric Anderson (m. 1998; div. 2008) Matthew Mogol (m. 2011; div. 2013) Chris Asplundh (m. 2021)
- Children: 2

Tracy Anderson (born March 3, 1975) is an American fitness entrepreneur and author. She is best known for her Tracy Anderson Method and for having various celebrity clients.

== Early life and career ==
The daughter of dance instructor Diana Ephlin, Anderson trained in dance from an early age in Noblesville, Indiana. She initially hoped to become a professional dancer in New York City. After a 40 lb. weight gain during her first year in New York City, Anderson switched her focus to weight loss/fitness training as a career. Anderson has gym locations in Los Angeles, New York City, The Hamptons, Spain and London and has a DVD collection for at-home training. In 2015, Tracy Anderson launched an online fitness program called TA Video Streaming. Each week, subscribers receive new workouts filmed in real-time at one of her studios. The online streaming workouts are divided into beginner (sTArt), intermediate (fundamenTAl) and advanced (atTAin).

She issued a pregnancy workout DVD collection aimed at women in the pre-and-postnatal periods.

== Critical reviews ==
In an April 2015 article in The Washington Post, personal trainer Kat Whitfield asserts that Anderson's methods "certainly don’t follow exercise physiology principles."

== Personal life ==
Tracy Anderson married basketball player Eric Anderson in 1998 and their son Sam was born that same year. The couple divorced in 2008. Eric Anderson died in 2018.

On September 27, 2011, she married Matthew Mogol. Their daughter, Penelope, was born in May 2012. In 2013, Anderson and Mogol split. According to ExtraTv, Matthew Mogol died on July 20, 2020, at the age of 48 after a battle with cancer.

In 2016, Anderson began dating Scottish-born hedge fund manager Nicholas Riley. They announced their engagement in early 2018 on Instagram. In April 2018, sources reported that Riley had called off their engagement.

Sometime in 2018, Anderson began dating Chris Asplundh. They got engaged in March 2020 when Asplundh proposed at Anderson's 45th birthday party. The couple married in 2021.
