= St. Francis de Sales High School (Chicago, Illinois) =

Location
- 10155 South Ewing Avenue; Chicago, Illinois 60617; United States; 41.71037°N 87.5349°W

Information
- School type: private, coed
- Religious affiliation: Roman Catholic
- Opened: 1893
- Oversight: Archdiocese of Chicago
- Principal: Dr. Roni-Nicole Facen
- Teaching staff: 24
- Grades: 9–12
- Enrollment: 190 (2025)
- Campus: urban
- Colors: navy blue gold
- Athletics conference: Chicago Catholic League; Girls Catholic Athletic Conference
- Nickname: Pioneers; Pioneer Nation
- Accreditation: North Central Association of Colleges and Schools
- Yearbook: Mitre
- Website: www.sfdshs.org

St. Francis de Sales High School is a private, Roman Catholic High School in Chicago, Illinois. It is located on the southeast side of the city, in the Roman Catholic Archdiocese of Chicago.

== History ==
The school is named for St. Francis de Sales (1567–1622), a Bishop of Geneva and Doctor of the Church.

The school was started by the School Sisters of Mary Immaculate of Joliet; who staffed the St. Francis de Sales parish schools, starting in 1893. In the late 1890s the school began to offer high school courses, though the school did not become a four-year high school, until 1937. In the 1950s, enrollment saw a significant increase and it became evident that if the school were to meet the educational challenges before it, an expansion of facilities was eminent.

New developments for the school were finished on February 19, 1956, and two years later, on April 20, 1958, the new building was dedicated. In 1962, the Archdiocese of Chicago officially took over operation of the school.

== Architecture ==
Designed in 1955 by well-known modernist architects Belli & Belli, the high school integrates several interesting features into the design of the high school and convent. The curvilinear south-facing library facade with a breezeway on the ground floor as well as the extremely large and regular windows punctuating the western facade was designed at least in part to take advantage of flow-through lake breezes from nearby Lake Michigan. An interesting use of textures includes terrazzo stairways, glazed terracotta tiles and clerestory windows in interior hallways. The outside is notable for limestone cladding, a southwestern orientation that maximizes both daylight and passive solar heating in the winter, the aforementioned breezeway, as well as modernist, circular concrete pads in the rear yard.

== Academics ==
Accredited by the North Central Association of Schools and Colleges, St. Francis de Sales’ academic program is guided by standards designed to provide a competent faculty, and a variety of instructional strategies, which allow each student to be successful.

Specific graduation requirements for St. Francis include the following:

4 credits of English

4 credits of Theology

2 credits of History

7 credits of Math and Science combined

2 credits of Foreign Language

2 credits of Electives

1 credit of Physical Education/Health

1 credit of Fine Arts

Students are strongly encouraged to take at least three units each in math, science, and social studies to comply with entrance requirements for the universities sponsored by the state of Illinois.

== Athletics ==
St. Francis de Sales is a member of two athletic conferences. Teams for young men compete in the Chicago Catholic League. Teams for young women compete in the Girls Catholic Athletic Conference (GCAC). The men's teams are called the Pioneers, while the women's teams are called the Lady Pioneers. St. Francis de Sales is also a member of the Illinois High School Association (IHSA) which governs most sports and competitive activities in Illinois, as well as sponsoring many of the state championship tournaments.

Sports currently available to St. Francis students include men's and women's basketball, baseball, softball, men's and women's soccer, volleyball, and wrestling.

== Notable alumni ==
- Eric Anderson was a professional basketball player, playing for the New York Knicks (1992–94) in the NBA.
- Malik Dixon was a basketball player, top scorer in the 2005 Israel Basketball Premier League
- Mike Sullivan was a professional offensive lineman (1992–95), playing his entire career for the NFL's Tampa Bay Buccaneers. Sullivan is an offensive line coach for the San Diego Chargers.
- Tracy Wilson is a safety (2011–present), playing for the NFL's Tennessee Titans. Wilson graduated from SFDS in 2006 and was the starting quarterback and a safety for the Pioneers. Wilson went on to play for Northern Illinois University.
- Jonathan Hood is the co-host of the #1 radio show in Chicago - The Kap and JHood Show which airs on ESPN 1000 weekdays from 7-10 a.m. He is also the Voice of the University of Illinois Chicago Flames on both their basketball and baseball games. He is the 2023 winner of the Harry Caray Sportscaster of the Year Award which is given annually by the Pitch and Hit Club of Chicago.
