= Jalen Brunson =

American basketball player (born 1996)

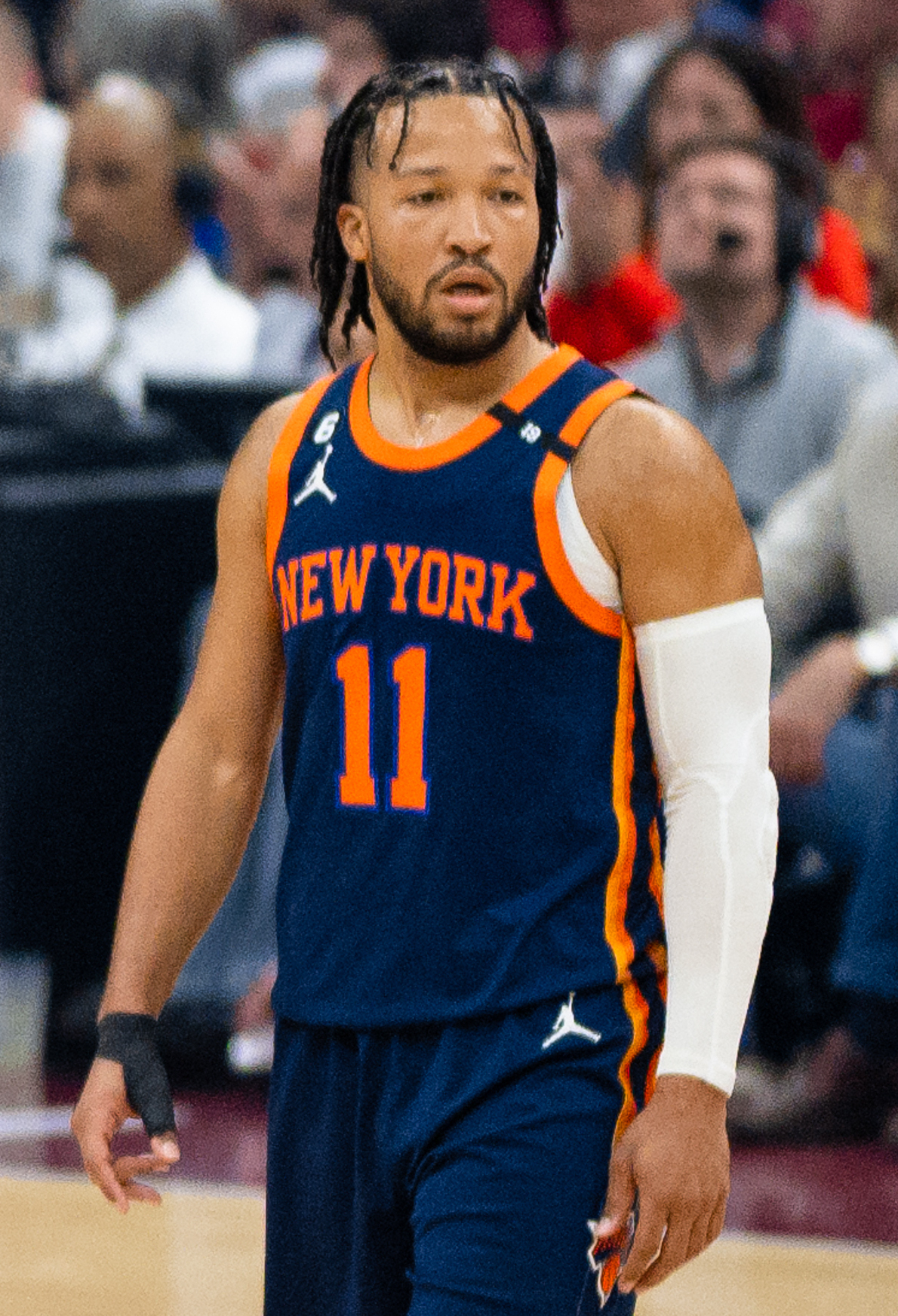
- Brunson with the New York Knicks in 2023

No. 11 – New York Knicks
- Position: Point guard
- League: NBA

Personal information
- Born: August 31, 1996 (age 30) New Brunswick, New Jersey, U.S.
- Listed height: 6 ft 2 in (1.88 m)
- Listed weight: 190 lb (86 kg)

Career information
- High school: Stevenson (Lincolnshire, Illinois)
- College: Villanova (2015–2018)
- NBA draft: 2018: 2nd round, 33rd overall pick
- Drafted by: Dallas Mavericks
- Playing career: 2018–present

Career history
- 2018–2022: Dallas Mavericks
- 2022–present: New York Knicks

Career highlights
- NBA champion (2026); NBA Finals MVP (2026); 3× NBA All-Star (2024–2026); 3× All-NBA Second Team (2024–2026); NBA Eastern Conference finals MVP (2026); NBA Cup champion (2025); NBA Cup MVP (2025); 2× NCAA champion (2016, 2018); National college player of the year (2018); Consensus first-team All-American (2018); Lute Olson Award (2018); Bob Cousy Award (2018); Second-team Academic All-American (2018); Big East Player of the Year (2018); 2× First-team All-Big East (2017, 2018); Big East All-Freshman Team (2016); No. 1 retired by Villanova Wildcats; USA Basketball Male Athlete of the Year (2015); FIBA Under-19 World Cup MVP (2015)
- Stats at NBA.com
- Stats at Basketball Reference
Medals
Men's basketball
Representing the United States
FIBA World U19 Cup
Gold medal – first place	2015 Greece	Team
FIBA Americas U18 Championship
Gold medal – first place	2014 United States	Team

Jalen Marquis Brunson (born August 31, 1996), nicknamed "Captain Clutch" and "the King of New York", (Note: Per The Wall Street Journal, ESPN, and The New York Times among others.) is an American professional basketball player for the New York Knicks of the National Basketball Association (NBA). The son of former NBA guard Rick Brunson, he played college basketball for the Villanova Wildcats, earning national player of the year honors as a junior and winning two national championships. Brunson was selected 33rd overall in the 2018 NBA draft by the Dallas Mavericks and played his first four NBA seasons with them. He signed with the Knicks as a free agent in 2022, subsequently leading the franchise to its first NBA championship in 53 years.

Brunson participated in the 2015 McDonald's All-American Boys Game, Jordan Brand Classic, and Nike Hoop Summit. He led Stevenson to the Illinois High School Association (IHSA) Class 4A championship. He won Illinois Mr. Basketball and was named the MVP of the 2015 FIBA Under-19 World Cup. Brunson was a role player for the championship season of the 2015–16 Villanova Wildcats and named the national player of the year and a consensus first-team 2018 All-American for the championship season of the 2017–18 Wildcats. After being selected by the Mavericks, Brunson spent four seasons with Dallas, culminating in a run to the Western Conference Finals.

Since joining the Knicks in 2022, Brunson has been named an NBA All-Star three times (2024–2026) and received three All-NBA Second Team selections in the same period. He set the NBA record for most three-point shots made in a half without a miss (8), and tied the NBA record for most three-point shots made in a single game without a miss (9). In 2025, he led the Knicks to their first Eastern Conference Finals appearance in 25 years. In 2026, he led the franchise to its first NBA Finals appearance since 1999 and its first NBA championship since 1973, earning both the Eastern Conference Finals MVP and the NBA Finals MVP. He also tied Michael Jordan’s record for most points scored in a title clinching road finals game (45) which Jordan set back in 1998 against the Utah Jazz.

== Early life ==
Born in New Brunswick, New Jersey, Brunson was raised in southern New Jersey until sixth grade. He is the son of Rick and Sandra Brunson. He has a younger sister, Erica. His parents met at Temple University, where Rick played for the basketball team and Sandra played volleyball. There, Sandra was volleyball teammates and roommates with Kobe Bryant's sister, Sharia Bryant. Rick spent nine seasons in the NBA. The family first settled in Cherry Hill, New Jersey, but moved seven times before settling in the Chicago area in 2010, where Jalen played his high school career for Stevenson High School. As a youth, he spent time in NBA locker rooms while his father played for the Knicks and his future head coach Tom Thibodeau worked for the team as an assistant coach. His after-school chores included basketball exercises. While Rick was director of basketball operations at the University of Virginia, Jalen practiced with the Virginia Cavaliers women's basketball team. As a teenager, he trained with Derrick Rose and Joakim Noah. At age 13, he began hiring a professional strength and conditioning coach.

== High school career ==
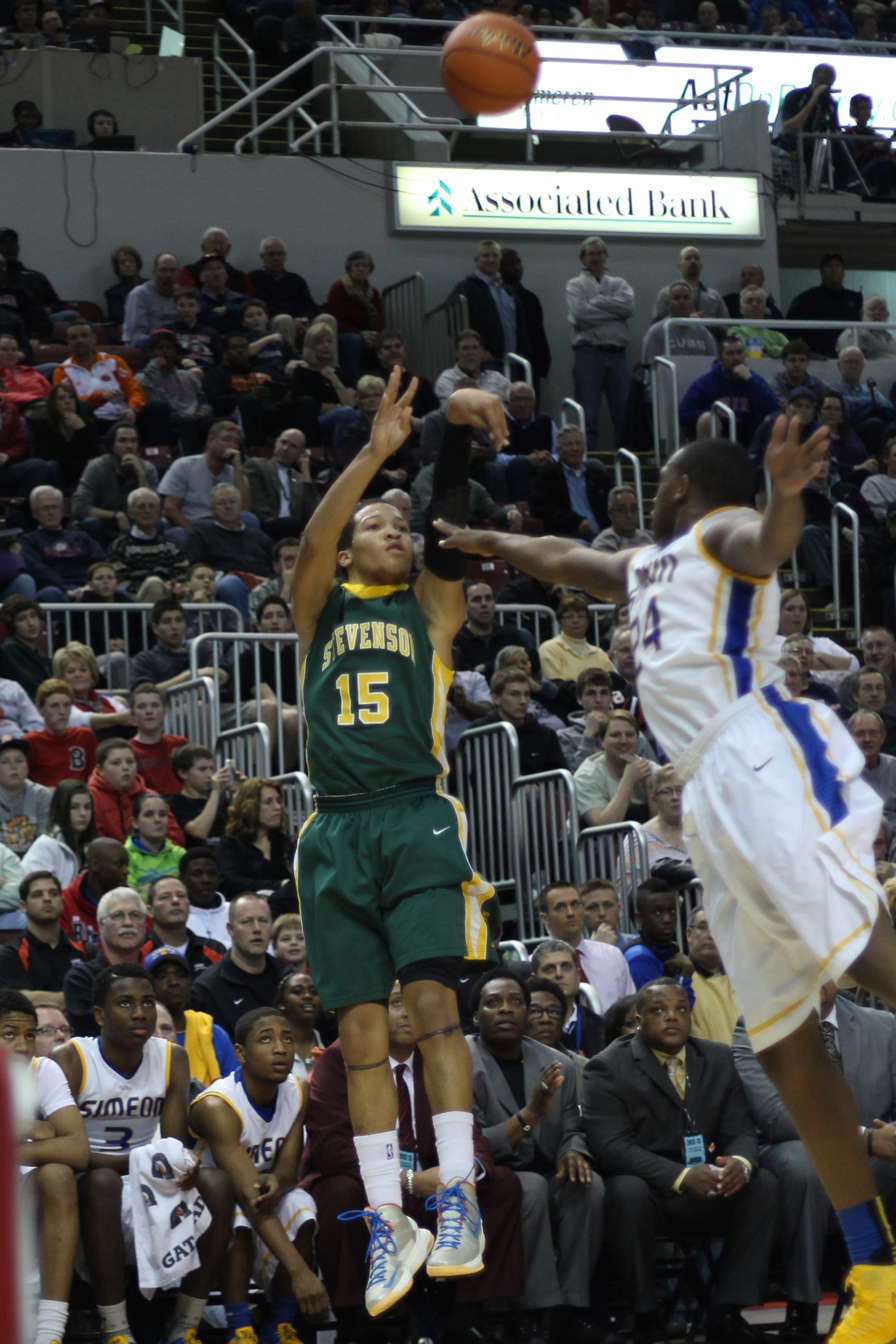
Brunson shooting in the 2013 IHSA Class 4A championship game

As a freshman, Brunson was an All–Lake County honorable mention selection in 2012, as Stevenson finished the season with a 17–11 record. During his sophomore season, Stevenson started the season 10–4 before going on a 19-game winning streak. That year, Brunson led Stevenson to the March 16, 2013, IHSA Class 4A championship game against Jabari Parker and Kendrick Nunn's three-time defending state champion Simeon Career Academy, where he got the Simeon backcourt in foul trouble in the first half before being held to one point in the second half of a 58–40 loss. Stevenson finished the season 29–5. Following the season, the Associated Press named him to the Class 4A All-state second team as the only sophomore on the first or second team. Brunson averaged 21.5 points that season.

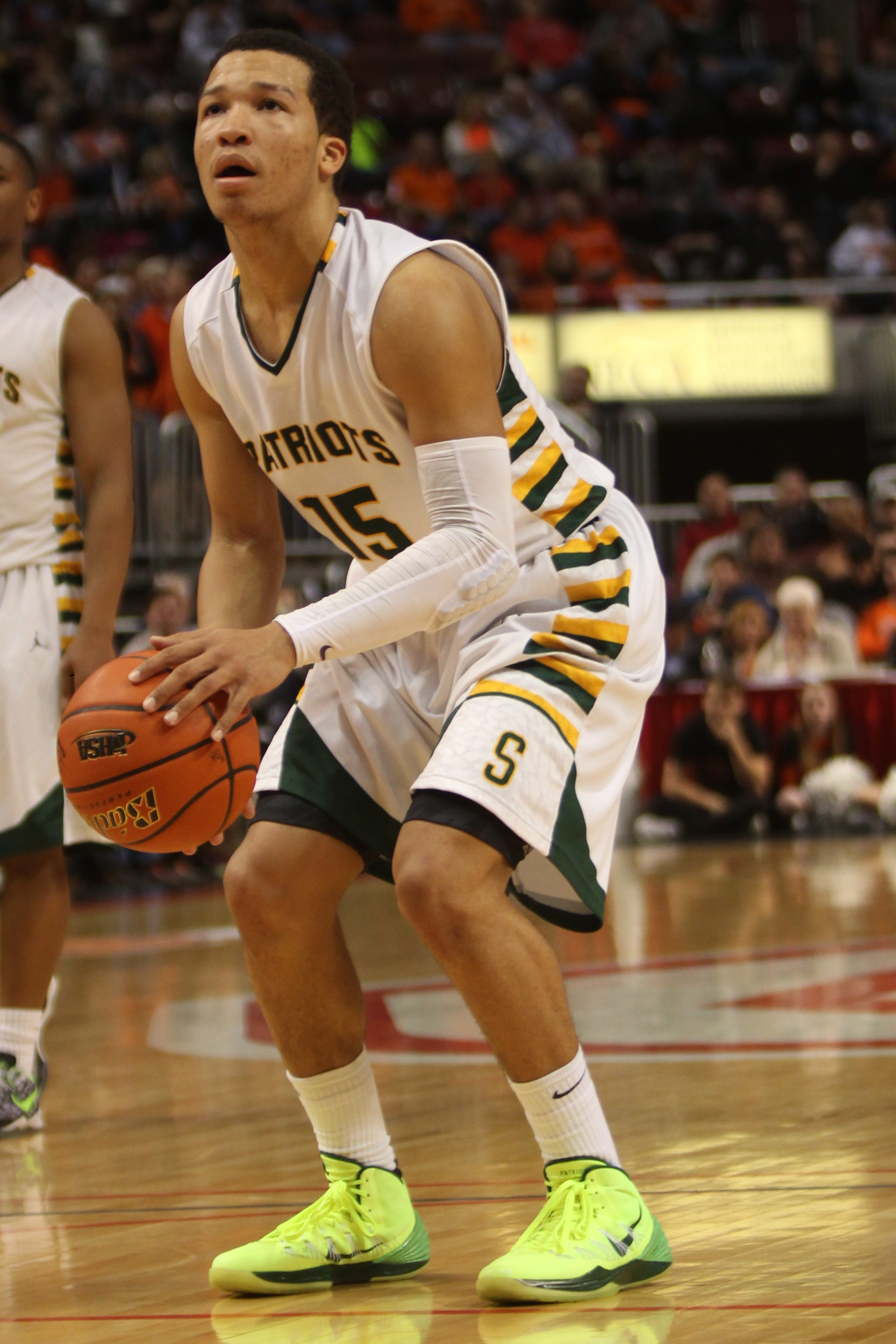
Brunson in the 2014 IHSA Class 4A consolation game

On February 21, 2014, junior Brunson scored 57 points in a double overtime victory over Lake Forest High School. The performance gave him both the school single-game and career scoring records. On March 21, Brunson set the IHSA playoff single game scoring record against the Jahlil Okafor–led Whitney Young High School by scoring 56 points in a 75–68 state playoff semifinal loss. Brunson averaged 26.1 points, 5.4 rebounds, 4.7 assists and 2.9 steals for a Stevenson team that finished the season with a 32–2 record. Brunson was named Gatorade Player of the Year for the state of Illinois as a junior. Following the season, Associated Press named him as the only non-senior on the Class 4A All-state first team that also included Okafor, Cliff Alexander, Tyler Ulis and Sean O'Mara. He finished fourth in the 2014 Illinois Mr. Basketball voting.

In April 2014, Illinois, Purdue, Kansas and Villanova had in-home visits. On May 3, 2014, he announced the eight schools that he was considering playing college basketball for: UConn, Michigan State, Illinois, Kansas, Purdue, Villanova, Michigan and Temple. That summer, he was the No. 1-ranked point guard, according to ESPN, although the class had a notable shortage of elite pure point guards. On June 25—the day after Jalen won a gold medal at the 2014 FIBA Americas Under-18 Championship—Rick Brunson received an offer as an on-bench assistant coach from Temple. The Temple offer fell through when Rick Brunson was arrested on various charges on July 25, and Temple fell out of the running for Jalen's services. Brunson participated in the July 9–11 LeBron James Skills Academy. On August 5, he announced official visits to Illinois on August 29–31, Villanova on September 4–6 and then Temple from September 11–13 and on August 9, he announced official visits to Michigan State from September 19–21 and Purdue on September 26–28.

On September 8, Brunson announced that he would be curtailing his recruitment and making his decision between Illinois and Villanova on September 10. On that date, Brunson committed to Villanova. At the time of his decision, he was the No. 1-ranked point guard in the national class of 2015 by Scout.com. Stevenson was a preseason top-10 team in the MaxPreps national high school rankings. Much was expected of Brunson's team after losing to teams led by Parker and Okafor in the IHSA tournament final four in 2013 and 2014 even though no team from Lake County had ever won a state basketball championship. The team rattled off 11 straight victories to start the season before losing 88–81 to Chaminade Prep and its star Jayson Tatum in the Cancer Research Classic in Wheeling, WV, despite 48 points from Brunson. On January 17, Brunson and Stevenson faced Derryck Thornton, Jr. and Findlay Prep at the Hoophall Classic. At the time, Brunson was the number 3 ranked point guard in the class of 2015 and Thornton was the number 2 ranked point guard in the class of 2016 for the number 1 team in the country according to USA Today. Findlay, who was led by Arizona signee Allonzo Trier's 27 points, held Brunson to 26 in the second loss of the season for Stevenson, who had been 15–1. On January 28, he was named to the 2015 McDonald's All-American Boys Game roster, becoming the second player from Lake County to earn such recognition. On February 2, he was named to the 11-man Team USA for the Nike Hoop Summit. On February 21, Stevenson lost to Simeon as Brunson posted 25 points on 9–24 shooting, ending a 22-game in-state streak in a game that featured the top two teams in the state. The Simeon frontline featured three Big Ten Conference signees: D. J. Williams (Illinois), Ed Morrow (Nebraska) and Isaiah Moss (Iowa). On March 5, he was named to the Jordan Brand Classic roster.

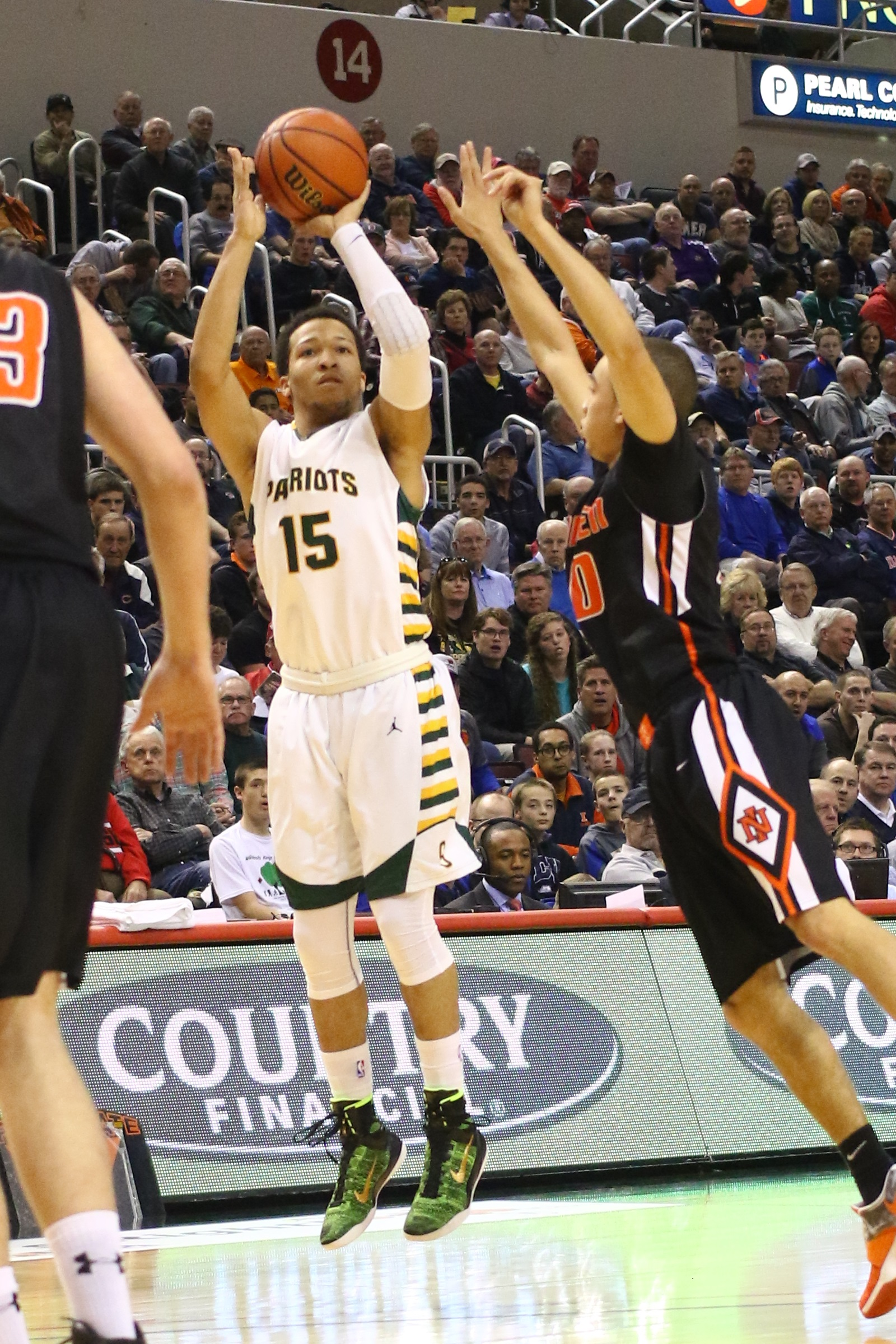
Brunson scoring the first 3 of his IHSA Class 4A title game record 30 points in 2015

On March 17, Brunson helped Stevenson qualify for a third consecutive appearance in the IHSA final four with a victory over Riverside Brookfield High School. In the game, Brunson became the Lake County career scoring record holder. On March 19, Brunson received the highest vote total for the Illinois Class 4A Associated Press All-state team. On March 20, he repeated as Illinois Gatorade Player of the Year. Brunson led Stevenson to the IHSA final four for a third consecutive time, but he led the team to the first state championship by a Lake County school with an IHSA Class 4A title-game record 30 points in a 57–40 victory over Normal Community High School. Brunson was 9-for-15 from the field and 9-for-9 from the free throw line. 2015 was Lake county's ninth consecutive year with a team reaching the IHSA final four; Stevenson became the first school in the large school division and the third school overall to win IHSA football and basketball state championships in the same year. The win got him out of the shadow of IHSA final four losses to Parker- and Okafor-led teams.

Following the season, he won Illinois Mr. Basketball with 552 points and 99 of the 132 first place votes, ahead of fellow Jordan Brand All-American selection Charles Matthews, who had 157 points. Brunson finished his senior season with averages of 23.3 points, 5.2 assists and 4.7 rebounds per game and with shooting percentages of 38% on three-point shots and 83% on free throws. At the March 30 POWERADE Jam Fest associated with the McDonald's All-American game, Brunson won the skills competition over finalists Carlton Bragg and Isaiah Briscoe, and was a finalist for the three-point shooting contest. Brunson was a first-team Parade All-American, as well as a third-team USA Today All-USA high school basketball team selection. In the April 11 Nike Hoops Summit, Brunson had 12 points and seven assists in a 103–101 loss. In the April 17 Jordan Brand Classic, Brunson had a game-high three steals. He finished his high school career ranked No. 16 in the ESPN 100 and as the #2-point guard behind Isaiah Briscoe.

=== Recruiting ===
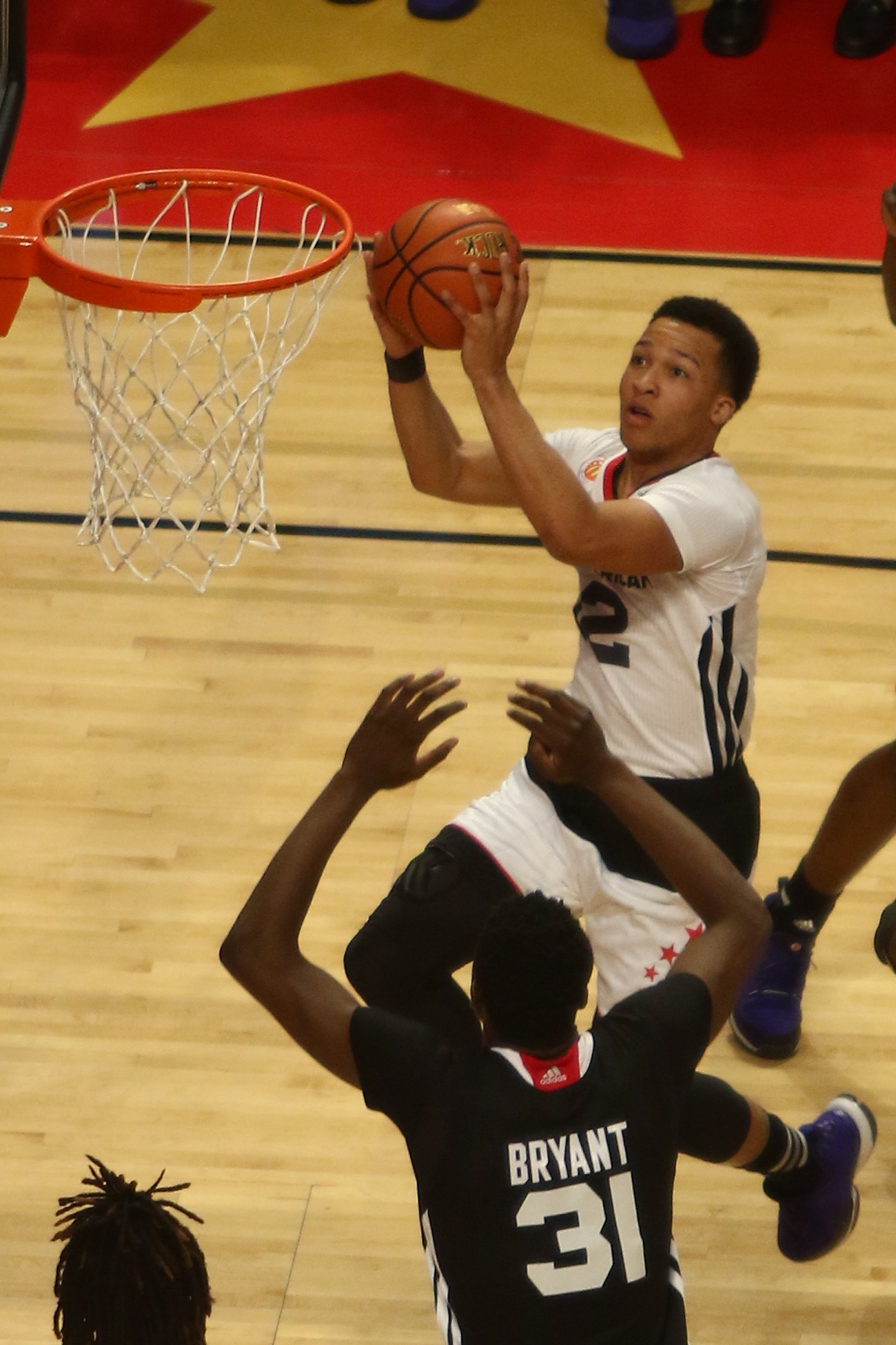
Brunson in the 2015 McDonald's All-American Game

Brunson, like his father, is a left-handed basketball player. In what was regarded as a weak point guard class, Brunson was the only point guard that was ranked in the top 25 players at the conclusion of the class of 2015's junior season. In addition to high ratings by the recruiting services, Brunson's peers voted him to be the best passer in high school basketball prior to his senior season.

College recruiting
Name	Hometown	School	Height	Weight	Commit date
Jalen Brunson; PG	Lincolnshire, IL	Stevenson (IL)	6 ft 2 in (1.88 m)	190 lb (86 kg)	Sep 10, 2014
Jalen Brunson; PG	Recruit ratings: Scout: Rivals: ESPN: (90)				
Overall recruit ranking: Scout: 16, 1 (IL), 1 (PG) Rivals: 15, 5 (G) ESPN: 16, 1 (IL), 2 (PG)
Note: In many cases, Scout, Rivals, 247Sports, On3, and ESPN may conflict in their listings of height and weight.; In these cases, the average was taken. ESPN grades are on a 100-point scale.; Sources: "Villanova 2015 Basketball Commitments". Rivals.; "2015 Villanova Basketball Commits". Scout.; "ESPN". ESPN.; "Scout.com Team Recruiting Rankings". Scout.; "2015 Team Ranking". Rivals.

== College career ==
=== Freshman season ===
Brunson was a selection to the 20-man Bob Cousy Award preseason watchlist. He was also selected as the 2015–16 Big East Conference Preseason Freshman of the Year by the conference coaches although Henry Ellenson was the only freshman selected to the 2015–16 Preseason All-Big East First or Second Team. Brunson's 2015–16 Wildcats were the unanimous coaches preseason selection to win the conference. In preseason top 100 player rankings Brunson was ranked 46 by ESPN and 41 by NBC Sports. During the preseason, Mike Rutherford of SB Nation selected Brunson as one of its 10 most important college basketball players for 2015–16. He made the initial 50-man John R. Wooden Award watch list on November 17. On December 2, Brunson earned recognition on the 18-man Wayman Tisdale Award watchlist.

Brunson opened the season in the starting lineup with 12 points and 4 assists against the Fairleigh Dickinson Knights on November 13. On November 26 in the semifinals of the NIT Season Tip-Off against Stanford, Brunson posted 18 points. On December 28, he posted a then career-high 22 points against Penn. The 22-point effort was part of a 3–0 week for Villanova in which Brunson averaged 15.3 points and earned Big East Freshman of the Week. On February 8, the 2015–16 Wildcats became the first Villanova Wildcats men's basketball team to reach number one in the AP Poll by climbing to the top of the 2015–16 NCAA Division I men's basketball rankings. Following the 2015–16 Big East season, he was a unanimous Big East All-Freshman Team selection. In the 2016 NCAA Division I men's basketball tournament regional final against Kansas Brunson made the final two free throws that gave the Wildcats a two-possession lead with 3.5 seconds left. The 2015–16 Wildcats won the championship game of the tournament by defeating the North Carolina Tar Heels 77–74, with Brunson as a starter.

=== Sophomore season ===
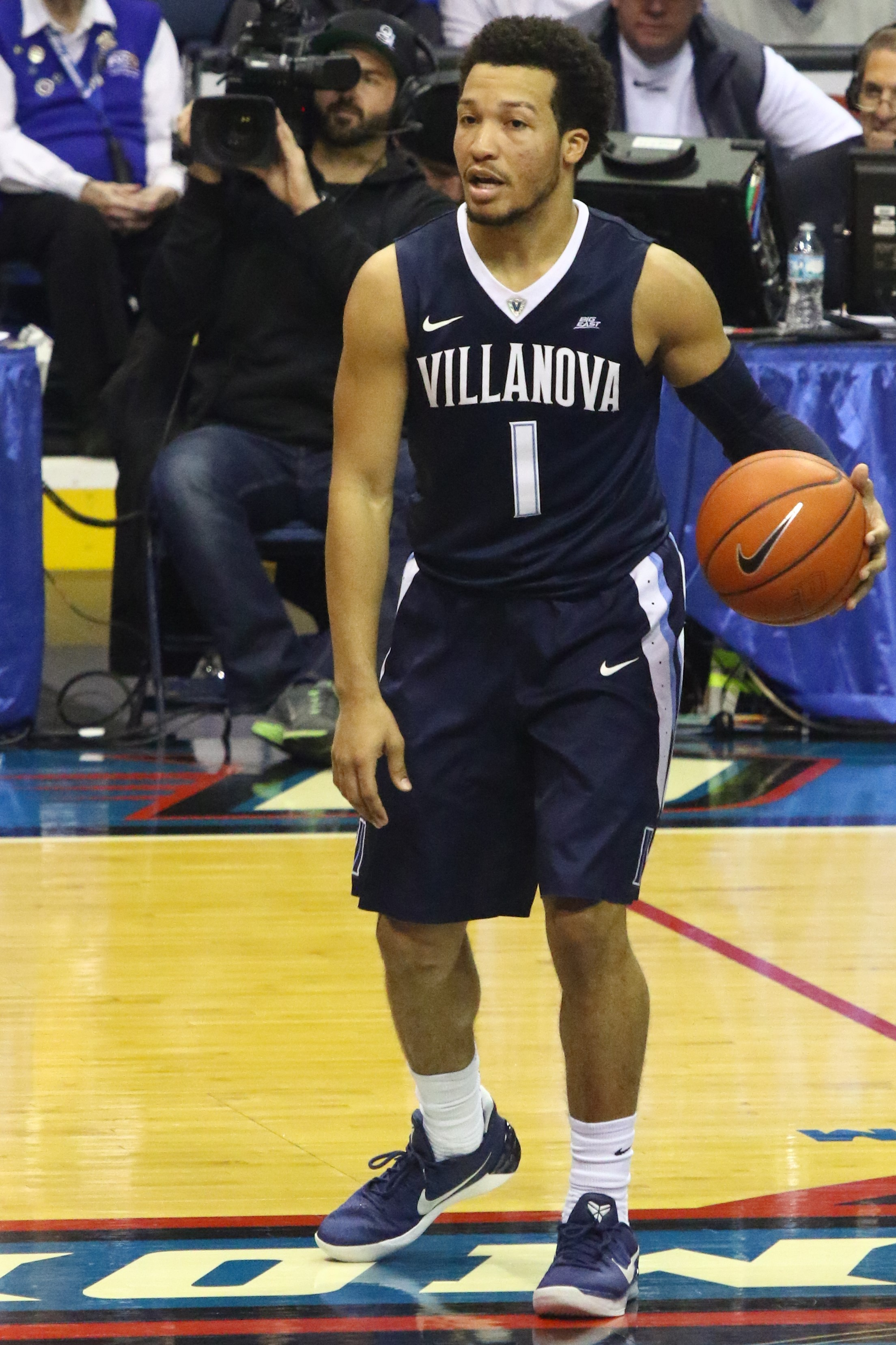
Brunson for the 2016–17 Villanova Wildcats

Brunson was a selection to the 20-man Bob Cousy Award preseason watchlist again as a sophomore. He was a preseason All-Big East honorable mention selection. On December 5, the 2016–17 Wildcats ascended into the top position in the 2016–17 NCAA Division I men's basketball rankings. The following night, Brunson posted a then career-high 26 points in a Philadelphia Big 5 win over La Salle. After helping guide Villanova to a victory in its 2016–17 Big East season opener against DePaul on December 28, Brunson scored a career high 27 points in an 80–70 December 31 win over No. 10 Creighton to propel No. 1 Villanova to a 14–0 record and 2–0 in conference play.

These two performances earned Brunson Big East player of the week recognition on January 2. Brunson was named to the February 9 Naismith Award Top 30 watch list. On February 18, against Seton Hall, Brunson posted his first career double double with a career-high 10 assists and 22 points. Following the regular season, he was one of four unanimous selections to the 2016–17 All-Big East first team. After averaging 14.7 points and 4.1 assists as a sophomore, Brunson decided to return to Villanova for his junior season. After the season ended and the 2017 NBA draft class was finalized, Brunson was projected to be a preseason All-American by NBC Sports.

=== Junior season ===
He was the 2017–18 preseason All-Big East player of the year. He was a pre-season All-American selection by Associated Press (1st team) and ESPN (2nd team). He was a preseason John R. Wooden Award, Oscar Robertson Trophy, Lute Olson Award and Naismith College Player of the Year watchlist honoree. Brunson led Villanova to the championship of the 2017 Battle 4 Atlantis, earning the MVP of the tournament and being recognized on November 27 as the Big East Player of the Week. On December 13, Brunson scored a career-high 31 points, including 22 in the first half, to lift the Wildcats over Temple 87–67. The next time he would score 31 points in a game was on December 30, 2017, when Villanova lost its first game of the season to Butler. He posted a third 31-point total on January 28 to help Villanova to an 85–82 victory over Marquette.

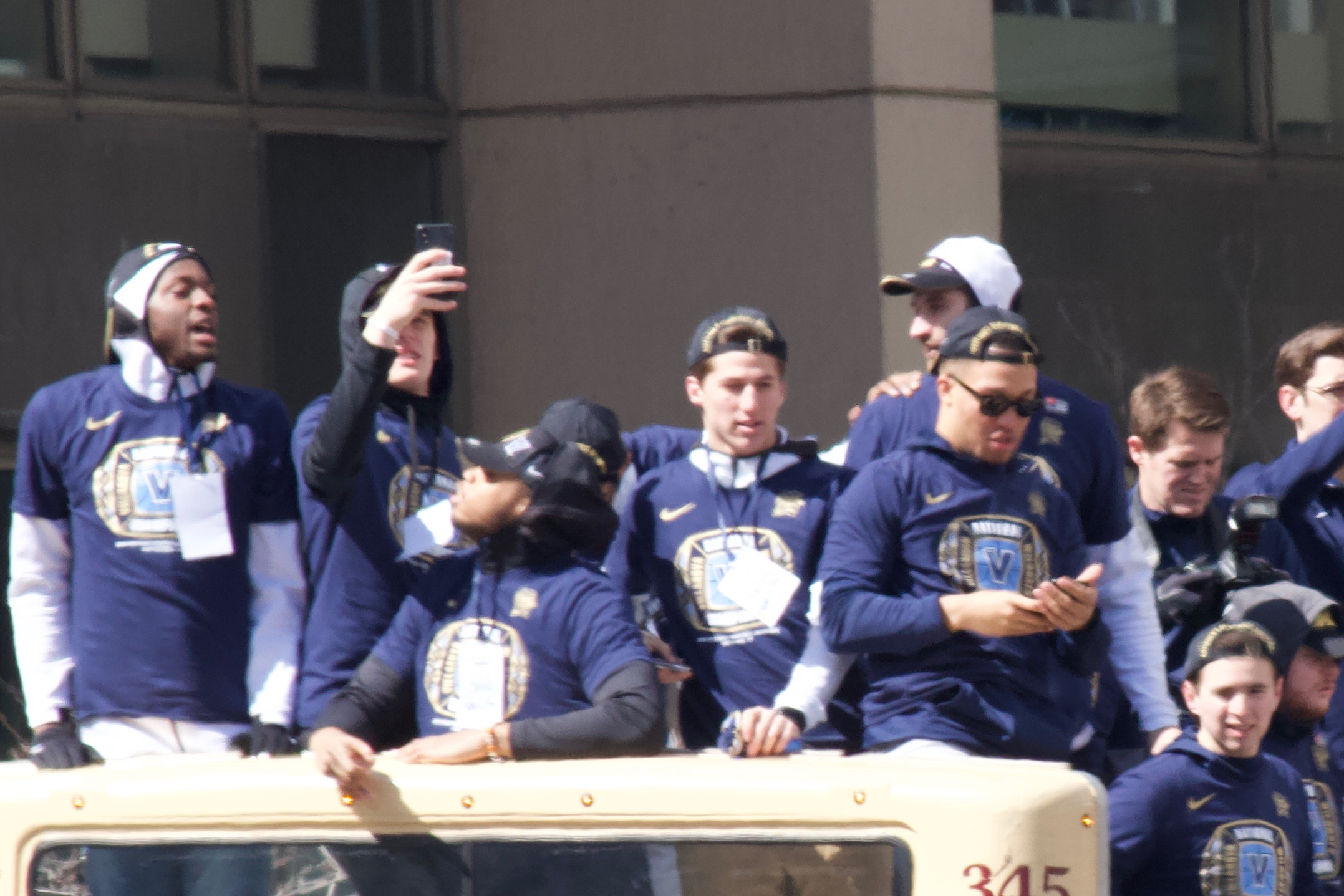
Eric Paschall, Donte DiVincenzo, Omari Spellman, Collin Gillespie and Jalen Brunson.

Brunson was named as an Academic All-District selection, making him one of 40 finalists for the 15-man Academic All-America team. He was named as one of 10 semifinalists for the Naismith Award. He was named as one of 20 late-season finalists for the Wooden Award. Following the regular season, Brunson was one of three unanimous 2017–18 All-Big East selections, and he was named both the Big East Conference Men's Basketball Player of the Year and the Big East Scholar-Athlete of the Year a few days later. As a scholar, he was on pace to graduate during the summer after his junior season.

He was a consensus first-team All-American after being selected as a first-team All-American by Sporting News, USBWA, Associated Press, and NABC. He was also awarded the USBWA Oscar Robertson Trophy the Associated Press College Basketball Player of the Year, the Naismith College Player of the Year, the John R. Wooden Award, the NABC Player of the Year, CBS Sports National Player of the Year, the Bob Cousy Award, and Sporting News Player of the Year. Brunson was a second-team Academic All-America selection. Brunson was named Most Outstanding Player of the East Region and was joined on the East Region All-tournament team by Omari Spellman and Eric Paschall. Villanova won the National Championship Game of the 2018 NCAA men's basketball tournament. Following his junior season, he declared for the 2018 NBA draft and hired an agent. On December 17, 2019, Brunson was named college basketball player of the decade by Sporting News.

== Professional career ==
=== Dallas Mavericks (2018–2022) ===
==== Sixth man role (2018–2021) ====
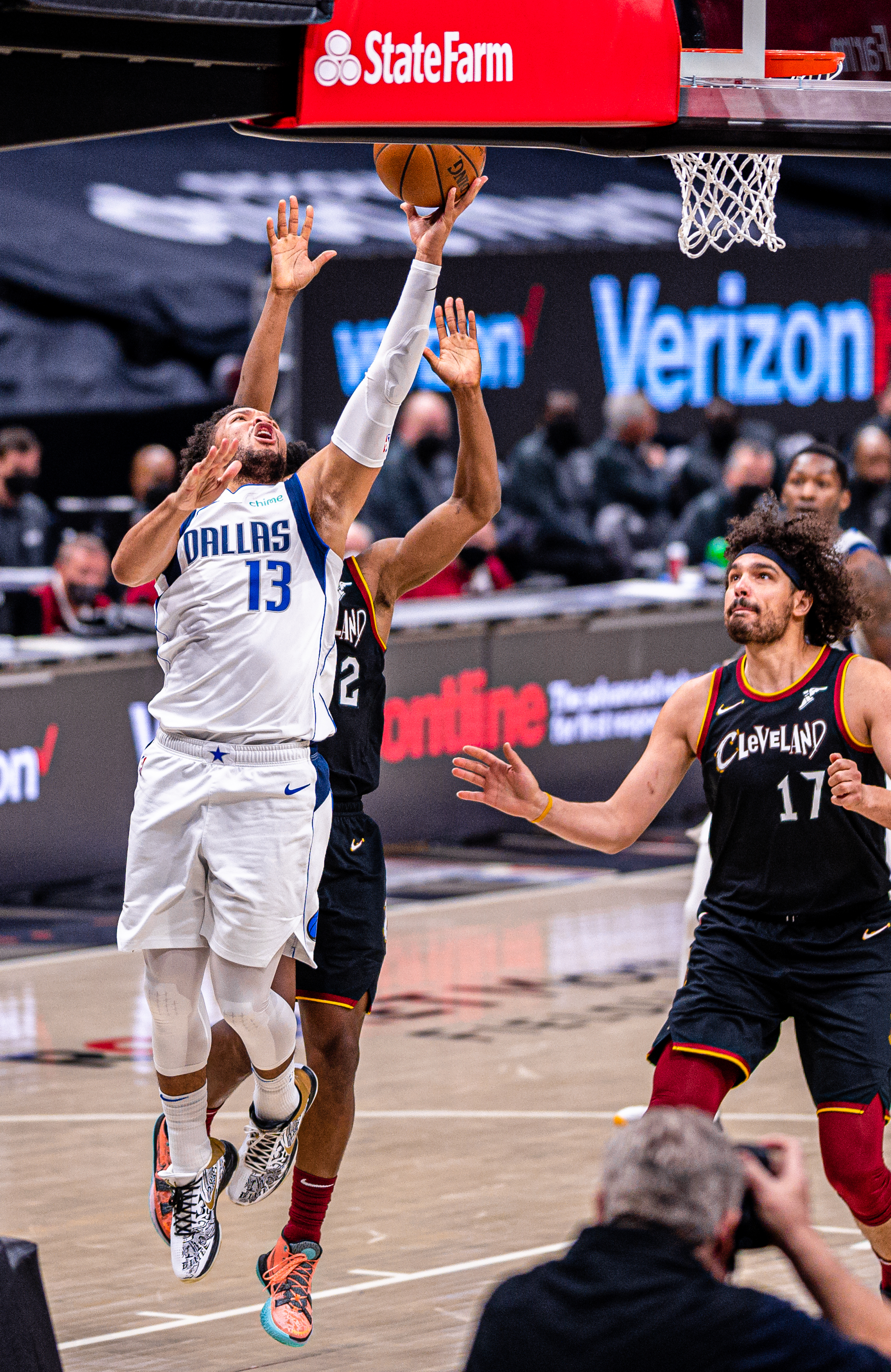
Brunson takes a layup with the Dallas Mavericks in a game against the Cleveland Cavaliers in 2021

On June 21, 2018, the Dallas Mavericks drafted Brunson with the 33rd overall pick. He was the fourth and final Villanova player to be selected in the 2018 NBA draft. Brunson did not sign until after he completed his 2018 NBA Summer League play and was accorded a 4-year contract similar to a first round selection with 3-years guaranteed. He made his NBA debut on October 17, 2018, recording three points, one rebound, and an assist in a 121–100 loss to the Phoenix Suns. After coming off the bench for his first four NBA games, Brunson started in place of the injured Dennis Smith Jr. on October 26, against the Toronto Raptors, scoring eight points, four assists, and three rebounds. On November 8, Brunson posted 11 points against Utah Jazz. Brunson replaced Smith in the starting lineup and posted career highs of 14 points on December 8 against the Houston Rockets and 17 points on December 10 against the Orlando Magic.

On January 5, 2019, he was honored by the Philadelphia Sports Writers Association as its Amateur Athlete of the Year. That same night, with J. J. Barea and Devin Harris sidelined, Brunson posted 13 points, a career-high 11 rebounds, and a then-career-high eight assists against the Philadelphia 76ers for his first professional double-double. Starting in place of Luka Dončić on February 22, Brunson posted a then career-high 22 points against the Denver Nuggets. On March 12, 2019, Brunson improved upon his career high with 34 points with five rebounds, four assists, and a steal in a 112–105 loss to the San Antonio Spurs. On April 7, Brunson posted a then career-high 10 assists along with 12 points against the Memphis Grizzlies for his second career double-double.

With Dončić out of the lineup on December 16, 2019, and Brunson starting, the 2019–20 Mavericks ended an 18-game win streak by the Milwaukee Bucks, on a night when Brunson posted a career-high 11 assists and his first double-double of the season (13 points). On March 13, 2020, Brunson was reported to have undergone surgery to fix a labrum injury in his right shoulder. During the 2020–21 NBA season, Brunson averaged career highs in points, rebounds, and assists, finishing fourth in voting for the NBA Sixth Man of the Year Award.

==== Playoff success (2021–2022) ====
In the 2021–22 NBA season, Brunson became a starter and again finished the season achieving career highs in points, rebounds, and assists. His breakout continued in the playoffs, where he led the Mavericks, who were without Luka Dončić for the first three games against the Utah Jazz. On April 16, 2022, during game 1 of the first round, Brunson logged 24 points, seven rebounds, and five assists in a 99–93 loss to the Jazz. On April 18, during game 2, Brunson had the best game of his career up to that point, where he dropped 41 points, eight rebounds, and five assists in a 110–104 win over the Jazz. On May 15, Brunson scored 24 points and grabbed six rebounds in a 123–90 game 7 win against the first-seeded Phoenix Suns, securing the Mavericks a place in the Western Conference finals. On May 20, during game 2 of the Western Conference finals, Brunson recorded 31 points, 7 rebounds, and 5 assists in a 126–117 loss against the Golden State Warriors.

=== New York Knicks (2022–present) ===
==== Breakthrough (2022–2023) ====
On June 2, 2022, his father was hired by the New York Knicks as an assistant coach. On July 12, 2022, Brunson signed a four-year, $104 million contract with the New York Knicks. The Knicks were later punished for engaging in conversations with Brunson before the free agency window opened. On October 19, he made his Knicks debut in a 115–112 loss in overtime to the Memphis Grizzlies, scoring 15 points with nine assists and six rebounds. On October 26, Brunson scored 27 points, recorded 13 assists, and grabbed seven rebounds during a 134–131 overtime victory against the Charlotte Hornets.

On January 4, 2023, Brunson scored 38 points alongside seven rebounds and six assists in a 117–114 win over the San Antonio Spurs. On January 9, Brunson put up a then-career-high 44 points in a 111–107 loss to the Milwaukee Bucks. On January 16, Brunson was recognized as NBA Eastern Conference player of the Week for the week of January 9–15 after averaging 34.8 points, 5.8 rebounds, and 5.0 assists with 3 30-point games as the Knicks went 3–1 for the week. It was his first career NBA Player of the Week award. On January 18, Brunson scored 32 points in a 116–105 loss against the Washington Wizards. He scored 25-plus points in eight straight games, the longest streak by a Knicks guard since Dick Barnett in 1965. Barnett logged 25 or more points in 12 consecutive contests.

On February 4, Brunson scored 41 points on 14-of-19 shooting, 5-of-7 from three, 8-of-10 from the free throw line, along with five rebounds and seven assists in a 134–128 overtime loss against the Los Angeles Clippers. On February 8, Villanova retired his jersey. On February 13, Brunson put up 40 points on 15-of-21 shooting from the field and added five assists in a 124–106 win over the Brooklyn Nets. On March 1, Brunson scored 39 points (30 points in the first half) on 15-of-18 shooting, 5-of-6 from three, and 4-of-4 from the free throw line in a 142–118 win over the Brooklyn Nets. On March 2, Brunson won his first NBA Player of the Month award when he was named the NBA Eastern Conference Player of the Month for February. He finished the month with 27.3 points and 6.0 assists while shooting 42.6% from three-point range and 52.9% overall. The Knicks went 9–2, finishing out the month with six straight wins. On March 31, Brunson scored a career-high 48 points (33 points in the first half) on 18-of-32 shooting from the floor and delivered nine assists in a 130–116 win over the Cleveland Cavaliers. In game 4 of the Eastern Conference semifinals against the Miami Heat, Brunson put up 32 points and 11 assists in a 109–101 loss. He joined Walt Frazier and Patrick Ewing as the only players in Knicks history to put up at least 30 points and 10 assists in a playoff game. New York would lose to Miami in six games despite Brunson tying his playoff career high of 41 points in a 96–92 game 6 loss.

==== First All-Star and All-NBA appearances (2023–2024) ====
On November 20, 2023, Brunson earned his second NBA Player of the week award as the Knicks went 3–1 while averaging 28.5 points and 6.5 assists, including back-to-back 32-point performances. On November 30, Brunson put up 42 points, six rebounds and eight assists in a 118–112 win over the Detroit Pistons. He also tied the record for the most 40-point games by a point guard (5, Frazier, Stephon Marbury) in Knicks history.

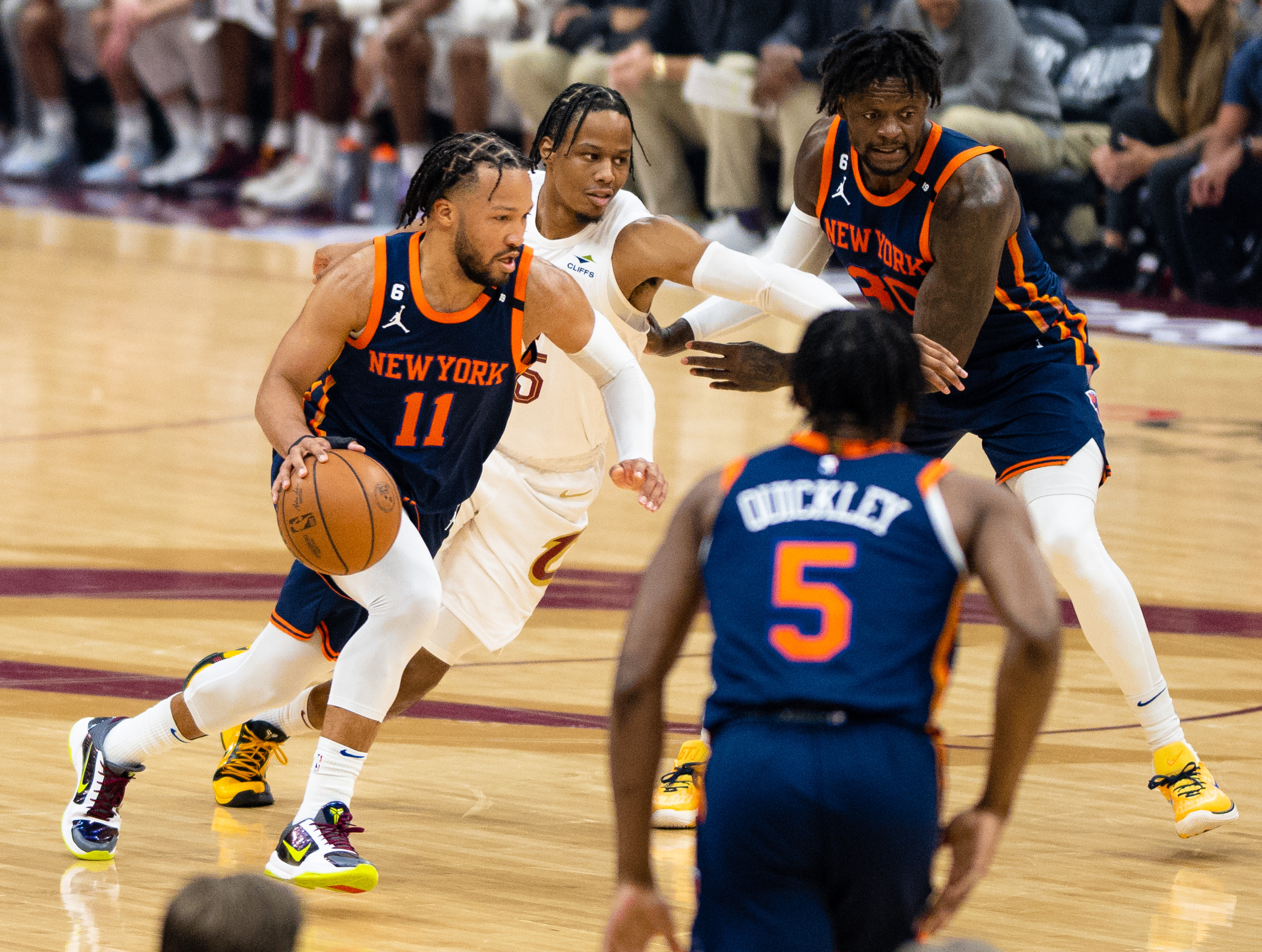
Brunson and teammates Julius Randle and Immanuel Quickley during a Knicks-Cavs game in 2023

On December 15, he posted a then career-high 50 points on 17–23 shooting, including 9–9 three point shooting, as well as 9 assists, 6 rebounds and 5 steals in a comeback win against the Phoenix Suns. He became the ninth player to score 50 points as a Knick. His 9–9 game tied an NBA record for perfect three point performances that was initially set by New York Knick Latrell Sprewell who went 9–9 on February 4, 2003, and twice tied by Ben Gordon for the Bulls on April 14, 2006, and for the Pistons on March 21, 2012. It was the first 50-point performance in NBA history without a missed three-point shot (minimum 8 attempts), (Note: Kyrie Irving on March 12, 2015, posted 57 points with 7–7 three point performance which included 11 points 3–3 in overtime) helping snap a 13-game losing streak by the Knicks against teams with Kevin Durant. Brunson was 12–12 (8–8 on threes) in the second half from the field, becoming the first NBA player to shoot 8–8 on three point shots in an NBA half. The previous record of 7-for-7 had been held by many players. It had been achieved at least three times each of the prior two NBA seasons. Prior to the 2021–22 NBA season, five players had gone 7–7 in an NBA half (all before 2015, first by Raef LaFrentz). Brunson had a 7–7 (5–5 on threes) 3rd quarter. On February 10, 2017, Carmelo Anthony went 5–5 on three point shots (8–8 from the field) in a quarter and 6–6 in a half for the Knicks. His 35-point second half was the first time an NBA player had scored over 30 points in a half without missing from the field, while taking at least 10 field goal attempts and 5 three point attempts. The performance marked the first time an NBA player had posted 50 points, five rebounds, five assists, five steals and five three-pointers. Brunson was the sixth player and first since Anthony Davis to record 50 points, five assists, five steals on October 16, 2016, as well as the first player since Michael Jordan on March 18, 1988, to record at least 50 points, nine assists, five rebounds and five steals.

On January 1, 2024, in new teammate OG Anunoby's debut with the Knicks, Brunson posted a career-high 14 assists against the Minnesota Timberwolves. On January 3, he followed that up with 13 assists against the Chicago Bulls, marking his first pair of games with back-to-back double digit assist totals that season. For the week of January 1—7, he was awarded his second NBA Player of the week award of the season and third of his career as he led the Knicks to a 4–0 record for the week. Later in the month, Brunson posted five consecutive 30-point games. Brunson's January was the 2nd highest single-month plus-minus (256) in NBA history (to Scottie Pippen's 272 in November 1996). On February 1, Brunson was named as reserve for the 2024 NBA All-Star Game for the first time in his career. On March 14, he scored 45 points against the Portland Trail Blazers. On March 16, Brunson scored 42 points against the Sacramento Kings, becoming the fourth Knick to score 40 or more in back-to-back games, joining Anthony, Patrick Ewing and Bernard King. On March 18, Brunson earned NBA Eastern Conference Player of the Week recognition for averaging 35.7 points during a 3–0 week for the Knicks. On March 29, Brunson put up a career-high 61 points in a 130–126 overtime loss to the San Antonio Spurs. The performance was one point shy of the Knicks franchise record by Carmelo Anthony set on January 24, 2014. Brunson was awarded with player of the month for March. He averaged 28.8 points and 5.8 assists per game during the month. On April 7 and 9, Brunson posted 43 points against Milwaukee and 45 against Chicago, respectively, for another back-to-back 40+ pair of games. Then, Brunson scored 39 points despite sitting out the fourth quarter against the Boston Celtics on April 11. This effort made Brunson the third Knick to have posted 5 consecutive 35+-point games (King: 5, 1984–85; Anthony: 6, 2012–13). By finishing the season with 7 consecutive 30-point games, he tied the Knicks franchise single-season 30-point games record with his 36th (Richie Guerin, 1961–62; Ewing, 1989–90). The April 14 season finale 40-point performance against the Bulls also tied him with Ewing for second on the Knicks single-season 40-point game list with 11 (behind King, 13). On April 15, Brunson earned Eastern Conference Player of the Week for averaging 38.5 points, 7.5 assists and 3.5 rebounds and shooting 50 percent on three-point shots, while leading the Knicks to a 4–0 record and a number two playoff seeding. Brunson finished 5th in the NBA Most Valuable Player Award voting and was named to the All-NBA Second Team for the first time in his career.

In game 4 of the first round of the playoffs against the Philadelphia 76ers, Brunson scored 47 points in a 97–92 victory. The tally was a career single-game playoff-high and a Knicks single-game playoff-record. King had twice scored 46 during the 1984 NBA playoffs. With 10 assists, he became the first Knick to score 40 points during an assist-points playoff double double. He also became the first Knick with consecutive 30-point assist-points playoff double-doubles and his 24-point second half established the Knick career record with seven 20+-point playoff halves. In that series, he became the second NBA player (and the first since Oscar Robertson in the 1973 NBA playoffs) to have three 35+-point/10+-assist games in an NBA playoff series. He became the first player to close out an NBA playoff series with 3 consecutive 40+-point games since Michael Jordan did so with The Shot in the 1989 NBA playoffs. Brunson opened the second round of the playoffs against the Indiana Pacers with 43 points and 6 assists, becoming the 4th player in NBA history and first since Jordan in the 1993 NBA Finals to score 40+ in four consecutive playoff games and the first ever to do so with 5+ assists in each of the four playoff games. He also became the first Knick to post five consecutive 30+ point/5+ assist games. In game 5, he scored 44 points in the game, including 28 in the first half to set a Knicks record for points scored in a playoff half. In game 7, Brunson fractured his left hand, as the Knicks were eliminated in seven games; shortly after, he underwent surgery to repair his broken hand.

==== Clutch Player of the Year and Eastern Conference finalist (2024–2025) ====
On July 12, 2024, two years to the day of his signing with New York, Brunson signed a four-year, $156.5 million contract extension through the 2028–29 season. He would have been eligible for a five-year, $256 million contract in 2025 offseason, but he opted to take less in order to help the team have more flexibity to make future moves. A few months later, the Knicks traded for Karl-Anthony Towns.

On August 6, the Knicks named Brunson as the 36th captain in franchise history. Brunson earned conference player of the week on December 2. On December 28, Brunson posted 55 points, 42 of which came in the second half or later, including nine in overtime in a 136–132 overtime victory over the Washington Wizards. On January 25, 2025, Brunson was named as an Eastern Conference starter for the 2025 NBA All-Star Game. Brunson again earned conference player of the week honors on March 3 for leading the Knicks to a 3–0 record. On April 23, Brunson was named the NBA Clutch Player of the Year; during clutch situations (Note: defined by the NBA as any possessions in the last five minutes of the fourth quarter or overtime when the score differential is five points or less) in the regular season, he led the league in made field goals (52), and ranked second in total points (156) and third in total assists (28). In the same situations, he also shot 51.5% from the field, 84.0% from the free throw line and averaged a league-best 5.6 points per game. Brunson finished 10th in MVP Award voting and was named to the All-NBA Second Team for the second-straight year.

On May 1, Brunson scored 40 points and hit the game-winning three-pointer to seal the Knicks' series-clinching 116–113 game 6 victory over the Detroit Pistons in the first round of the NBA playoffs. On May 12, Brunson recorded 39 points, 5 rebounds, and 12 assists in a 121–113 game 4 victory, helping the Knicks take a 3–1 series lead over the Boston Celtics in the Eastern Conference semifinals. He became the highest scorer in fourth quarters through the first 10 games of a playoffs since 1997, eclipsing Kobe Bryant and Stephen Curry. This marked the first time the Knicks franchise had reached the Eastern Conference Finals since 2000 against the 1999–2000 Indiana Pacers after losing in the conference semi-finals the prior two seasons and 2013.

On May 21, in game 1 of the Eastern Conference finals, Brunson scored 43 points in a 138–135 overtime loss to the 2024–25 Indiana Pacers. With the performance, he recorded his 8th 40-point playoff game as a Knick, passing Bernard King for the most in franchise history, and tied Patrick Ewing with his 18th 30-point playoff game as a Knick. On May 23, In game 2 of the Eastern Conference finals, Brunson posted 36 points and 11 assists in a 114–109 loss against the Pacers. He passed Ewing for the most 30-point playoff game in Knicks history. Also, only Michael Jordan and LeBron James have more 35-point, 10-assist playoff games in the Eastern Conference in NBA history. On May 29, in game 5 of the Eastern Conference finals, Brunson had 32 points, five rebounds, and five assists in the Knicks' 111–94 victory over the Pacers. It was his 10th game this postseason with at least 30 points and five assists, making him one of only four players in NBA history to reach that mark in a single playoff run. The other three players to achieve this are Michael Jordan, LeBron James and Shai Gilgeous-Alexander. The Knicks would go on to lose to the Pacers in six games, falling 125–108 in the game 6 closeout.

==== NBA Champion and NBA Finals MVP (2025–2026) ====
Brunson won Eastern Conference Player of the Week on December 1, 2025, by averaging 28.8 points, 4.5 assists and 40.7% three point shooting as the Knicks went 4–0. On December 13, 2025, Brunson scored a then season-high 40 points and delivered 8 assists to lead the New York Knicks to a 132–120 victory over the Orlando Magic in the NBA Cup semifinal, helping the team advance to the final. On December 16, Brunson scored 25 points and recorded eight assists to lead the Knicks to a 124–113 victory over the San Antonio Spurs in the NBA Cup final, earning NBA Cup MVP honors for his performance and being recognized as a member of the All-Tournament Team. On December 19, Brunson had 25 points, seven rebounds, and seven assists, making a game-winning three-pointer with 4.4 seconds remaining in a 114–113 win over the Indiana Pacers. On December 21, Brunson scored a season-high 47 points along with eight assists in a 132–125 victory over the Miami Heat; the 47 points also marked his career-high scoring performance at Madison Square Garden. On December 22, Brunson earned Eastern Conference Player of the Week. For his outstanding performance in December, during which Brunson averaged 30.6 points and 7.1 assists per game and led the Knicks to a 10–4 record, he was named the Eastern Conference NBA Player of the Month, marking the third time in his career he received the honor.

On January 19, 2026, Brunson earned his third consecutive NBA All-Star selection and was named a starter for the second time in a row. On January 30, Brunson put up 26 points in a 127–97 win over the Portland Trail Blazers and achieved 10,000 career points. On February 4, Brunson recorded 42 points, 8 rebounds, and 9 assists, leading the Knicks to a 134–127 overtime win over the Denver Nuggets. On March 6, Brunson recorded his second straight 15-assist game in the Knicks' 142–103 win over the Denver Nuggets, becoming the first Knick to do so since Mark Jackson in 1989. Brunson led the Knicks to a 53–29 record and the third seed in the Eastern Conference. He was named to the All-NBA Second Team for a third consecutive season.

On May 5, Brunson scored 35 points in 31 minutes on 12-of-18 shooting in the Knicks' 137–98 win over the Philadelphia 76ers in game 1 of the Eastern Conference semifinals. He scored 27 points in the first half, including the Knicks' final 11 points before halftime. The game marked his fifth consecutive playoff game with at least 35 points against 76ers. He became only the third player since 2000 to record five straight postseason games with 35 or more points against a single opponent, joining LeBron James and Stephen Curry. In Game 1 of the Eastern Conference Finals, Brunson recorded 38 points, five rebounds, six assists, and three steals, including 17 points in the fourth quarter and overtime, as he led a late 44–11 comeback to help the Knicks overcome a 22-point deficit and defeat the Cleveland Cavaliers 115–104. In game 2, Brunson put up 19 points (17 of which came in the second half) and a playoff career-high 14 assists to contribute to a 109–93 win. Brunson averaged 25.5 points, 3.3 rebounds, and 7.8 assists per game during the series, as he led the Knicks to sweep the Cavaliers en route to being named the Eastern Conference finals MVP and leading the Knicks to the 2026 NBA Finals and their first finals appearance since 1999. Brunson and his father became the first father and son duo to reach the NBA finals as players with the same NBA franchise.

On June 3, in Game 1 of the NBA Finals, Brunson scored 30 points in the Knicks' 105–95 victory over the San Antonio Spurs. He scored 13 of his 30 points in the fourth quarter, helping New York overcome a 14-point second-half deficit and take a 1–0 lead in the series. With the performance, Brunson became only the second player in franchise history to score at least 30 points in his NBA Finals debut, joining Willis Reed. In Game 2, Brunson recorded 20 points, five rebounds, six assists, and five steals, and converted a game-winning free throw with 9.5 seconds remaining to give the Knicks a 105–104 lead over the Spurs. He helped New York secure a 2–0 series lead in the NBA Finals. The victory made the Knicks just the third team in NBA Finals history to win the first two games of a Finals series on the road, joining the 1993 Chicago Bulls and 1995 Houston Rockets. The Knicks also achieved their 13th straight postseason victory in a single playoff run, the second-longest streak in NBA history behind the 2017 Golden State Warriors. On June 10, Brunson scored a game-high 36 points with five rebounds, seven assists, and three steals in 44 minutes during Game 4 of the NBA Finals against the Spurs, helping the Knicks erase a 29-point deficit to complete the largest comeback in NBA Finals history and take a 3–1 lead in the series with a 107–106 victory. With 33 points by OG Anunoby, it was the first time two Knicks scored at least 30 points in an NBA Finals game. In Game 5, Brunson put up 45 points to lead the Knicks to a 94–90 win and close out the NBA Finals against the Spurs, 4–1, securing the Knicks' first NBA championship in 53 years. He averaged 32.6 points, 4.2 rebounds, 4.6 assists, and 2.0 steals per game over the five-game series while shooting 42.1% from the field and 38.9% from three-point range, and was named NBA Finals MVP. His 45 points set a franchise NBA Finals record and marked the highest-scoring performance of the series. He also joined Michael Jordan as the only two guards to score at least 45 points in an NBA Finals closeout game in NBA history. By scoring 45 of the Knicks' 94 points, Brunson tallied 47.9% of his team's points in a title-clinching game, which is second only to Michael Jordan.

Brunson became the eighth player to win NBA Finals MVP after winning an NCAA Division I men's basketball tournament. He became one of only five players in basketball history to win an NCAA national championship, the Naismith College Player of the Year Award, an NBA championship, and the NBA Finals Most Valuable Player Award, joining Kareem Abdul-Jabbar, Magic Johnson, Michael Jordan, and Bill Walton. Brunson became the fourth player to win the NBA Finals MVP after winning an NCAA Division I men's basketball tournament and a state high school championship, joining Abdul-Jabbar, Walton, and Johnson. He also become one of only four second round NBA draft picks to be named the NBA Finals MVP, joining Willis Reed, Dennis Johnson, and Nikola Jokić.

Winning the championship on the road in Texas followed his 2016 NCAA Division I men's basketball championship game victory in Houston, Texas and his 2018 NCAA Division I men's basketball championship game victory also in San Antonio, Texas. With "Nova Knicks" teammates Josh Hart and Mikal Bridges, they became the first trio of players to win both an NCAA and NBA championship together. The championship season marked the culmination of a turnaround during Brunson's time. The team had had 4 winning seasons in the 21 seasons before Brunson's 2022 arrival and 4 during Brunson's first four seasons. The team had made the NBA playoffs six times and won only one playoff series in the 22 seasons before Brunson's arrival, but won 8 series during Brunson's first four seasons. Brunson established an NBA record with a career playoff scoring average 6.8 points above his career regular season scoring average (min 50 playoff games). Jalen and Rick Brunson became the first father-son duo to win an NBA championship together on the same team with one as a player and the other on the coaching staff.

== Playing style ==
Brunson is known for having elite footwork, but not elite athleticism. Brunson describes himself as a "hustle player". Brunson draws a high number of offensive fouls. This includes charging fouls as well as non-charging fouls such as "illegal screens, pushoffs and other forms of induction". This is a result of a style of play that evolved out of necessity due to being equipped with strength and agility, but not the height, length or verticality to differentiate himself off the ground.

== National team career ==
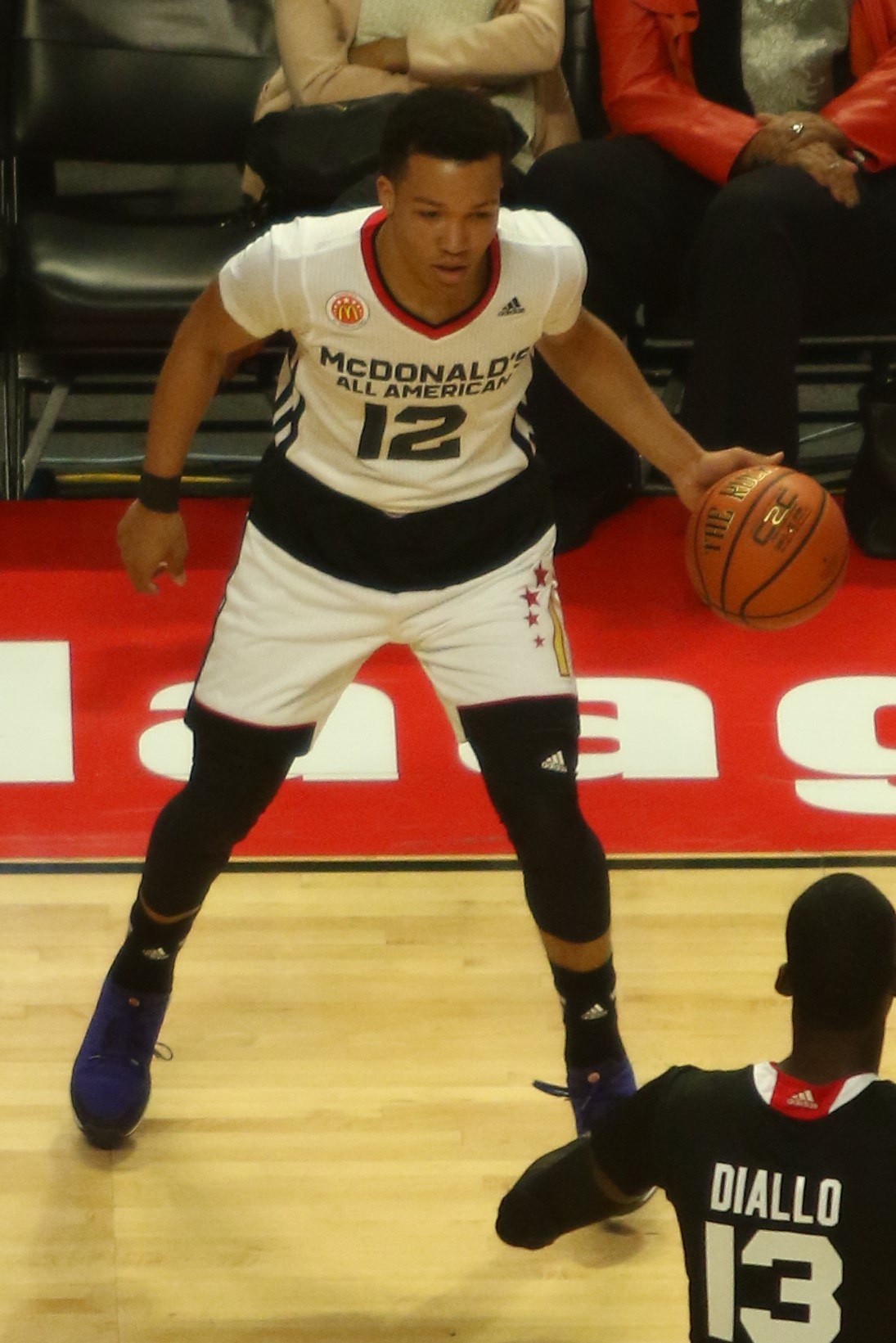
Brunson at the 2015 McDonald's All American game

On May 5, 2014, USA Basketball announced the 21 athletes (including Brunson) invited to try out from June 10 to 19 for the 12-member USA national team for the June 20–24, 2014 FIBA Americas Under-18 Championship. Eventually, 24 players tried out for the team and the roster was cut to 15 on June 12. Brunson made the final 12-man roster that was announced on June 15. In the opening game, Brunson surpassed Stephon Marbury's 12 assists against Brazil in the 1994 FIBA Americas U18 Championship by recording 13 against Uruguay to set a new USA Basketball U18 single-game assist record. The United States claimed a gold medal in the tournament. On August 16, Brunson was named to the Nike Global Challenge USA All-Tournament team along with Stephen Zimmerman, D. J. Hogg, Malik Monk, Jaylen Brown and Bam Adebayo. Brunson led the Midwest team to a third-place finish in the eight-team tournament.

On June 18, 2015, Brunson was announced as a member of the 12-man 2015 USA Basketball Men's U19 World Cup Team for the 2015 FIBA Under-19 World Cup. Brunson earned MVP of the tournament, after leading the team with 5.6 assists and 2.1 steals for the tournament. He posted a game-high 30 points in the semifinals against Greece, and he tallied a team-high 14 points including six in overtime as well as seven assists, five rebounds and a steal in the gold medal game against Croatia. Brunson tied teammate Harry Giles, with a 14.0 average for the tournament. He dominated in the final two games. Based on this performance, he was recognized as the USA Basketball Male Athlete of the Year, on December 21.

Brunson was one of the first commitments to the 2023 U.S. World Cup team, according to a June 4, 2023, tweet from Marc Stein, that was referenced by CBS Sports. The roster was finalized by July 3, with a relatively inexperienced squad. The United States finished fourth in the tournament but finished high enough (top 2 in the Americas) to secure a 2024 Olympic Games invitation.

== Entertainment ==
On August 16, 2026, Mariska Hargitay announced that Brunson would guest star on Law & Order: Special Victims Unit. On September 9, 2026, Brunson was announced as the guest host for the September 26 season premiere of Saturday Night Live (SNL) alongside musical guest KATSEYE. On September 17, it was announced that the Law & Order guest appearance would be in Season 28's fifth episode, set to air on November 5, 2026. Brunson's role as the host of the SNL season 52 opening episode marked the fifth time an NBA-connected athlete (Bill Russell, Michael Jordan, Charles Barkley and LeBron James) and fourth time an active NBA player hosted the show. Brunson was the first NBA player to host since Barkley in 2018 and the first active player to host since James in 2007. Brunson was the 37th professional athlete to host the show and the first since Travis Kelce hosted in 2023 soon after winning Super Bowl LVII.

== Awards and honors ==
NBA

- NBA champion: 2026
- NBA Finals MVP: 2026
- 3× NBA All-Star: 2024–2026
- 3× All-NBA Second Team: 2024–2026
- NBA Cup champion: 2025
- NBA Cup MVP: 2025
- NBA Cup All-Tournament Team: 2025
- NBA Eastern Conference Finals MVP: 2026
- NBA Clutch Player of the Year: 2025
- NBA All-Star Weekend Shooting Stars Competition winner: 2026

USA Basketball

- USA Basketball Male Athlete of the Year: 2015
- FIBA Under-19 World Cup gold medalist: 2015
- FIBA Under-19 World Cup MVP: 2015
- FIBA Under-19 Basketball World Cup All-Tournament Team: 2015
- FIBA Americas U18 Championship gold medalist: 2014

NCAA

- 2× NCAA champion: 2016, 2018
- National college player of the year: 2018
- Consensus first-team All-American: 2018
- Lute Olson Award: 2018
- Bob Cousy Award: 2018
- Second-team Academic All-American: 2018
- Big East Player of the Year: 2018
- 2× First-team All-Big East: 2017, 2018
- Big East All-Freshman Team: 2016
- Robert V. Geasey Trophy winner: 2018
- No. 1 retired by Villanova Wildcats

High school

- Illinois High School Boys Basketball Class 4A Championship: 2015
- McDonald's All-American: 2015
- First-team Parade All-American: 2015
- Illinois Mr. Basketball: 2015

Other

- Best Male Athlete ESPY Award: 2026
- Best NBA Player ESPY Award: 2026
- Best Championship Performance ESPY Award: 2026

== Career statistics ==
Legend
GP	Games played	GS	Games started	MPG	Minutes per game
FG%	Field goal percentage	3P%	3-point field goal percentage	FT%	Free throw percentage
RPG	Rebounds per game	APG	Assists per game	SPG	Steals per game
BPG	Blocks per game	PPG	Points per game	**Bold**	Career high
†	Won an NBA championship

=== NBA ===
==== Regular season ====
Year	Team	GP	GS	MPG	FG%	3P%	FT%	RPG	APG	SPG	BPG	PPG
2018–19	Dallas	73	38	21.8	.467	.348	.725	2.3	3.2	.5	.1	9.3
2019–20	Dallas	57	16	17.9	.466	.358	.813	2.4	3.3	.4	.1	8.2
2020–21	Dallas	68	12	25.0	**.523**	.405	.795	3.4	3.5	.5	.0	12.6
2021–22	Dallas	**79**	61	31.9	.502	.373	.840	**3.9**	4.8	.8	.0	16.3
2022–23	New York	68	68	35.0	.491	**.416**	.829	3.5	6.2	**.9**	**.2**	24.0
2023–24	New York	77	**77**	**35.4**	.479	.401	**.847**	3.6	6.7	**.9**	**.2**	**28.7**
2024–25	New York	65	65	**35.4**	.488	.383	.821	2.9	**7.3**	**.9**	.1	26.0
2025–26†	New York	74	74	35.0	.467	.369	.841	3.3	6.8	.8	.1	26.0
Career		561	411	30.0	.485	.385	.826	3.2	5.3	.7	.1	19.2
All-Star		3	2	17.4	.423	.353	—	2.3	4.0	1.3	.0	9.3

==== Playoffs ====
Year	Team	GP	GS	MPG	FG%	3P%	FT%	RPG	APG	SPG	BPG	PPG
2021	Dallas	7	0	16.3	.455	**.462**	.749	2.6	1.4	.0	.0	8.0
2022	Dallas	18	18	35.0	.466	.347	.800	4.6	3.7	.8	.1	21.6
2023	New York	11	11	**40.3**	**.474**	.325	**.912**	**4.9**	5.6	**1.5**	.1	27.8
2024	New York	13	13	39.8	.444	.310	.775	3.3	**7.5**	.8	.2	**32.4**
2025	New York	18	18	37.8	.461	.358	.851	3.4	7.0	.4	**.3**	29.4
2026†	New York	**19**	**19**	36.9	.465	.363	.846	3.2	6.1	1.2	.0	28.4
Career		86	79	35.9	.461	.347	.831	3.7	5.5	.8	.1	26.0

=== College ===
Year	Team	GP	GS	MPG	FG%	3P%	FT%	RPG	APG	SPG	BPG	PPG
2015–16	Villanova	**40**	39	24.0	.452	.383	.774	1.8	2.5	.7	.0	9.6
2016–17	Villanova	36	36	31.1	**.541**	.378	**.876**	2.6	4.1	**.9**	.0	14.7
2017–18	Villanova	**40**	**40**	**31.8**	.521	**.408**	.802	**3.1**	**4.6**	**.9**	.0	**18.9**
Career		116	115	28.9	.510	.393	.820	2.5	3.7	.8	.0	14.4

=== Records ===
==== NBA ====
- Most single-game three-point shots without a miss (9, tied)
- Most single-half three-point shots without a miss (8)
- Consecutive playoff games with 40+ points/5+ assists (4)
- Playoff scoring average minus regular season scoring average (6.8, min 50 playoff games, through 2026)

==== Knicks ====
- Single-season 30-point games (36, tied)
- Single-season 30-point point/assist double-doubles (6)
- Single-game playoff points (47, April 28, 2024)
- Single-half playoff points (28, May 14, 2024)
- Career playoff 20-point halves (12 through 2024 playoffs)
- First playoff 40-point point/assist double-double (April 28, 2024)
- Career playoff 40-points games with the Knicks (9)
- Career playoff 35-point games with the Knicks (18)
- Career playoff 30-points games with the Knicks (30)
- Consecutive playoff 30-point point/assist double-doubles (2, April 25 & 28, 2024)
- Consecutive playoff 30-point/5-assist games (5)
- Consecutive 20-point playoff games (20)
- NBA finals single-game points (45, 2026 game 5)
- NBA finals single-series 30-point games (4, 2026)
- NBA finals single-series average (32.6, 2026)
- First 30+ point NBA Finals teammates (36 Brunson, 33 OG Anunoby 2026, game 4)

== Personal life ==
On September 21, 2022, Brunson announced his engagement to physical therapist Ali Marks, his high school sweetheart. The proposal took place at Stevenson High School's gymnasium following Brunson's induction into the school's athletic Hall of Fame. Brunson and Marks were married on July 29, 2023, at The Ritz-Carlton Chicago; Brunson's current and former teammates were in attendance. The wedding had to be moved forward from Labor Day weekend (September 2) to accommodate Brunson's selection to United States men's national basketball team for the 2023 FIBA Basketball World Cup. Brunson and Marks welcomed their first child, a daughter, on July 31, 2024.

Brunson is close friends with New York Knicks teammate Josh Hart, a former teammate at Villanova and both run a podcast called Roommates together. Along with other former Villanova and Knicks teammates, Hart and Donte DiVincenzo were in attendance at Brunson's wedding to Marks, and DiVincenzo served as a groomsman.

On June 28, 2024, Brunson appeared in WWE SmackDown at Madison Square Garden, alongside Indiana Pacers guard Tyrese Haliburton.

Brunson is of Jamaican descent through his maternal grandparents who were both born in Jamaica.

== See also ==
- List of second-generation NBA players
- List of NBA single-game scoring leaders
- List of NBA regular season records
